= 1894 United States House of Representatives elections =

House elections for the 54th U.S. Congress

- June 4, 1894 (Note: Three states held early elections between June 4 and September 10.) – November 6, 1894 (Note: Not including special elections)

All 356 seats in the United States House of Representatives (Note: Includes late elections.) 179 seats needed for a majority
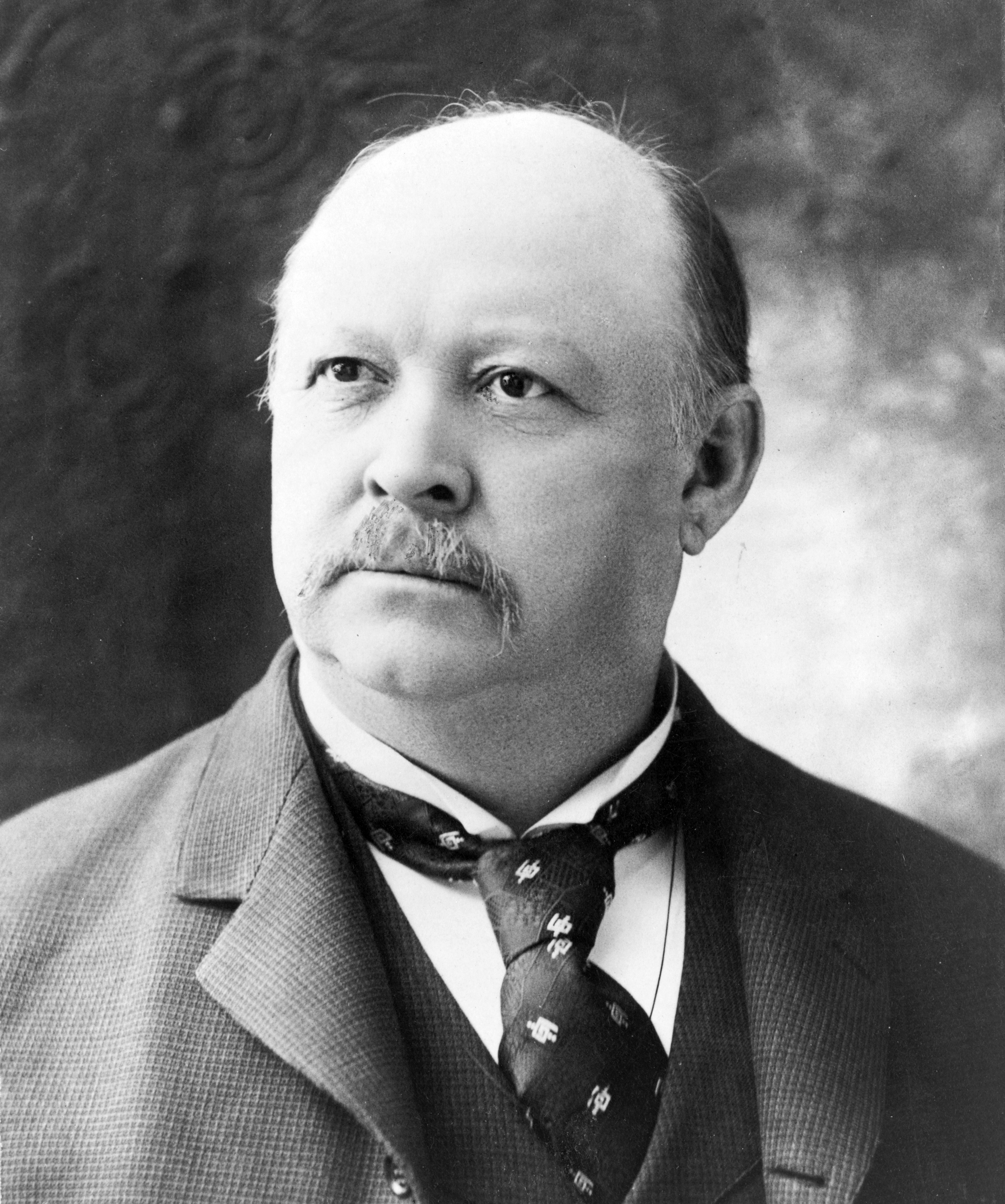

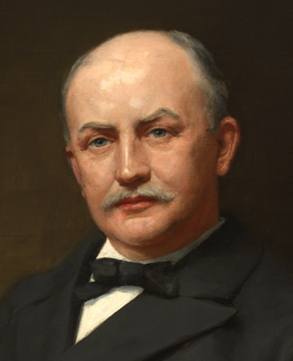

	Majority party	Minority party	Third party
Leader	Thomas Brackett Reed	Charles F. Crisp
Party	Republican	Democratic	Populist
Leader's seat	Maine 1st	Georgia 3rd
Last election	124 seats	218 seats	11 seats
Seats before	143 seats (Note: Includes two vacancies.)	198 seats (Note: Includes five vacancies.)	13 seats
Seats won	253 (Note: Martis's figure includes Utah, which held its election in 1895 and is therefore not covered in this article.) (Note: Dubin (p. 312) counts 244 Republicans, 105 Democrats, 7 Populists, and 1 Silver at the opening of the 54th Congress, before the results of several contested elections were overturned in favor of Republican (and a few Populist) candidates. Dubin counts 253 Republicans, 93 Democrats, 9 Populists, and 1 Silver at the start of the 2nd session of the 54th Congress, which closely matches Martis' figure (pp. 148–49). Dubin's figure includes Utah, which held its election in 1895 and is therefore not covered in this article.)	93	9
Seat change	▲110	▼105	▼4
Popular vote	5,442,266	4,252,292	1,242,242
Percentage	48.27%	37.72%	11.02%
Swing	▲7.45pp	▼9.66pp	▲2.73pp
	Fourth party	Fifth party
Party	Silver	Independent
Last election	1 seat	2 seats
Seats before	1 seat	2 seats
Seats won	1	0
Seat change	Steady	▼2
Popular vote	4,581	82,148
Percentage	0.04%	0.73%
Swing	▼0.02pp	▼0.08pp
- Results: (Note: This map shows the initial results of the election, not accounting for eleven seats in which the initial results were successfully contested during the subsequent 54th Congress: Alabama's 4th congressional district (Republican gain); Alabama's 5th congressional district (Populist gain); Alabama's 9th congressional district (Republican gain); Illinois's 3rd congressional district (Republican gain); Illinois's 16th congressional district (Republican gain); Kentucky's 10th congressional district (Republican gain); Missouri's 5th congressional district (Republican gain); New York's 8th congressional district (Republican gain); North Carolina's 6th congressional district (Populist gain); South Carolina's 1st congressional district (Republican gain); Virginia's 4th congressional district (Republican gain)); Democratic gain Republican gain Democratic hold Republican hold Populist gain Populist hold Silver hold
Speaker before election
Charles Crisp
Democratic
Elected Speaker
Thomas Reed
Republican

The 1894 United States House of Representatives elections were held from June 4, 1894, to November 6, 1894, with special elections throughout the year. Elections were held to elect representatives from all 356 congressional districts across each of the 44 U.S. states at the time, as well as non-voting delegates from the inhabited U.S. territories. The winners of this election served in the 54th Congress, with seats apportioned among the states based on the 1890 United States census.

The elections comprised a significant political realignment, with a major Republican landslide that set the stage for the transformational presidential election of 1896. The 1894 elections came in the middle of Democratic President Grover Cleveland's second term. The nation was in its deepest economic depression yet following the financial crisis of 1893, which pushed economic issues to the forefront. In the spring, a major coal strike damaged the economy of the Midwest and Mid-Atlantic. It was accompanied by violence; the miners lost and many joined the Populist Party. Immediately after the coal strike concluded, Eugene V. Debs led a nationwide railroad strike. It shut down the nation's transportation system west of Detroit for weeks, until President Cleveland's use of federal troops ended the strike. Debs went to prison for disobeying a court order. Illinois governor John Peter Altgeld, a Democrat, broke bitterly with Cleveland.

The fragmented and disoriented Democratic Party was crushed everywhere outside of the South, losing more than 55% of its seats to the Republican Party. The Democrats did so poorly that even in the South, they lost seats to the Republican-Populist electoral fusion in Alabama, North Carolina, Tennessee, Kentucky, and Texas. The Democrats ultimately lost 127 seats in this election, with the Republicans gaining 130 seats after the resolution of several contested elections.

The Democratic Party failed to win any seats in twenty-four states and only won one seat in six states. Prominent Democrats in the house including Richard P. Bland, William S. Holman, William M. Springer, and William L. Wilson were defeated in the election. To date, the 1894 election represents the largest seat swing in a single election in the history of the House of Representatives; the only other occasion where a political party has suffered triple-digit losses was in 1932.

The main issues revolved around the severe economic depression, which the Republicans blamed on the conservative Bourbon Democrats led by Cleveland. Cleveland supporters lost heavily, weakening their hold on the party and setting the stage for an 1896 takeover by the free silver wing of the party. The Populist Party ran candidates in the South and Midwest, but generally lost ground outside of the South. The Democrats tried to raise a religious issue, claiming Republicans were secretly coordinating with the anti-Catholic American Protective Association; the allegations seem to have fallen flat as Catholics swung towards the Republicans. Despite the Republicans winning a veto-proof majority, House Republicans were not sufficiently united to override President Cleveland's vetoes during his remaining two years in office.

== Election summaries ==
↓
93	10	254
Democratic	(Note: Populists won 9 seats and Silver won 1.)	Republican

State	Type	Total seats	Democratic		Populist		Republican		Silver	
State	Type	Total seats	Seats	Change	Seats	Change	Seats	Change	Seats	Change
Alabama	District	9	5	▼4	2	▲2	2	▲2	0	Steady
Arkansas	District	6	6	Steady	0	Steady	0	Steady	0	Steady
California	District	7	1	▼2	0	▼1	6	▲3	0	Steady
Colorado	District	2	0	Steady	1	▼1	1	▲1	0	Steady
Connecticut	District	4	0	▼3	0	Steady	4	▲3	0	Steady
Delaware	At-large	1	0	▼1	0	Steady	1	▲1	0	Steady
Florida	District	2	2	Steady	0	Steady	0	Steady	0	Steady
Georgia	District	11	11	Steady	0	Steady	0	Steady	0	Steady
Idaho	At-large	1	0	Steady	0	Steady	1	Steady	0	Steady
Illinois	District	22	0	▼11	0	Steady	22	▲11	0	Steady
Indiana	District	13	0	▼11	0	Steady	13	▲11	0	Steady
Iowa	District	11	0	▼1	0	Steady	11	▲1	0	Steady
Kansas	District +at-large	8	0	Steady	1	▼4	7	▲4	0	Steady
Kentucky	District	11	5	▼5	0	Steady	6	▲5	0	Steady
Louisiana	District	6	6	Steady	0	Steady	0	Steady	0	Steady
Maine (Note: Elections held early.)	District	4	0	Steady	0	Steady	4	Steady	0	Steady
Maryland	District	6	3	▼3	0	Steady	3	▲3	0	Steady
Massachusetts	District	13	1	▼3	0	Steady	12	▲3	0	Steady
Michigan	District	12	0	▼5	0	Steady	12	▲5	0	Steady
Minnesota	District	7	0	▼2	0	▼1	7	▲3	0	Steady
Mississippi	District	7	7	Steady	0	Steady	0	Steady	0	Steady
Missouri	District	15	4	▼9	0	Steady	11	▲9	0	Steady
Montana	At-large	1	0	Steady	0	Steady	1	Steady	0	Steady
Nebraska	District	6	0	▼1	1	▼1	5	▲2	0	Steady
Nevada	At-large	1	0	▼1	0	Steady	0	Steady	1	▲1
New Hampshire	District	2	0	Steady	0	Steady	2	Steady	0	Steady
New Jersey	District	8	0	▼6	0	Steady	8	▲6	0	Steady
New York	District	34	4	▼16	0	Steady	30	▲16	0	Steady
North Carolina	District	9	2	▼6	4	▲4	3	▲2	0	Steady
North Dakota	At-large	1	0	Steady	0	Steady	1	Steady	0	Steady
Ohio	District	21	2	▼9	0	Steady	19	▲9	0	Steady
Oregon	District	2	0	Steady	0	Steady	2	Steady	0	Steady
Pennsylvania	District +2 at-large	30	2	▼8	0	Steady	28	▲8	0	Steady
Rhode Island	District	2	0	▼2	0	Steady	2	▲2	0	Steady
South Carolina	District	7	6	Steady	0	Steady	1	Steady	0	Steady
South Dakota	At-large	2	0	Steady	0	Steady	2	Steady	0	Steady
Tennessee	District	10	6	▼2	0	Steady	4	▲2	0	Steady
Texas	District	13	12	▼1	0	Steady	1	▲1	0	Steady
Vermont	District	2	0	Steady	0	Steady	2	Steady	0	Steady
Virginia	District	10	8	▼2	0	Steady	2	▲2	0	Steady
Washington	At-large	2	0	Steady	0	Steady	2	Steady	0	Steady
West Virginia	District	4	0	▼4	0	Steady	4	▲4	0	Steady
Wisconsin	District	10	0	▼6	0	Steady	10	▲6	0	Steady
Wyoming	At-large	1	0	▼1	0	Steady	1	▲1	0	Steady
Total		356	93 26.1%	▼107	9 2.5%	▼4	253 71.1%	▲110	1 0.3%	▲1

Popular vote
Republican	48.27%
Democratic	37.72%
Populist	11.02%
Silver	0.04%
Independent	0.73%
Others	2.22%

House seats
Republican	71.07%
Democratic	26.12%
Populist	2.53%
Silver	0.28%

=== Maps ===
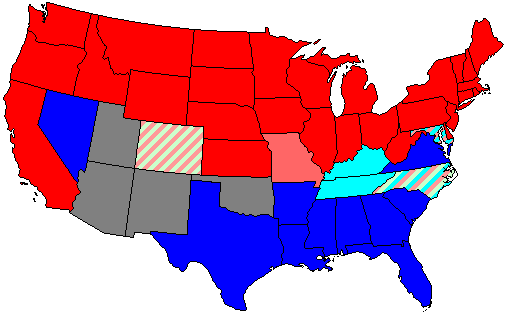
House seats by party holding plurality in state: 80+% Democratic / / 80+% Republican; 60+ to 80% Democratic / / 60+ to 80% Republican; Up to 60% Democratic / Up to 60% Populist / Up to 60% Republican

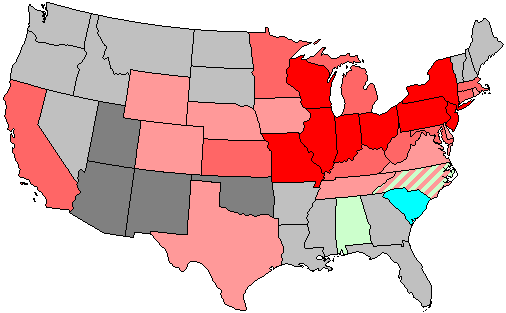
Net gain in party representation: 6+ Democratic gain / / 6+ Republican gain; 3 to 5 Democratic gain / / 3 to 5 Republican gain; 1 to 2 Democratic gain / 1 to 2 Populist gain / 1 to 2 Republican gain; no net change

Winner's vote share in each congressional district
Republican vote share in each congressional district

Democratic vote share in each congressional district

Populist vote share in each congressional district

== Special elections ==
15 special elections took place in 1894 leading up to and following the general election. They are listed below in order of election date then by state and district. Republicans flipped 3 seats in the special elections in New York's 14th, Kentucky's 9th, and Maryland's 5th congressional districts.

District	Incumbent			This race	
District	Member	Party	First elected	Results	Candidates
Virginia 7	Charles T. O'Ferrall	Democratic	1884 (special)	Incumbent resigned December 28, 1893 after being elected Governor of Virginia. New member elected January 30, 1894. Democratic hold. Winner later re-elected in November; see below.	▌ ✓ Smith S. Turner (Democratic) 65.09%; ▌E. D. Root (Republican) 34.59%; ▌Basil Gordon (unknown) 0.32%
New York 14	John R. Fellows	Democratic	1890	Incumbent resigned December 31, 1893 to become District Attorney of New York City. New member elected January 30, 1894. Republican gain. Winner later re-elected in November; see below.	▌ ✓ Lemuel E. Quigg (Republican) 49.62%; ▌William L. Brown (Democratic) 46.14%; ▌Daniel De Leon (Socialist Labor) 2.46%; ▌George Munro (Prohibition) 0.90%; ▌George A. Hunter (Populist) 0.88%
Pennsylvania at-large	William Lilly	Republican	1892	Incumbent died December 1, 1893. New member elected February 26, 1894. Republican hold.	▌ ✓ Galusha A. Grow (Republican); [data missing]
South Carolina 1	William H. Brawley	Democratic	1890	Incumbent resigned February 12, 1894, to become judge for the United States District Court for the District of South Carolina. New member elected April 12, 1894. Democratic hold.	▌ ✓ James F. Izlar (Democratic); [data missing]
Maryland 1	Robert F. Brattan	Democratic	1892	Incumbent died May 10, 1894. New member elected November 6, 1894. Democratic hold.	▌ ✓ W. Laird Henry (Democratic); [data missing]
Ohio 3	George W. Houk	Democratic	1890	Incumbent died February 9, 1894. New member elected May 21, 1894. Democratic hold.	▌ ✓ Paul J. Sorg (Democratic); [data missing]
Wisconsin 7	George B. Shaw	Republican	1892	Incumbent died August 27, 1894. New member elected November 6, 1894. Republican hold.	▌ ✓ Michael Griffin (Republican) 57.8%; ▌George W. Levis (Democratic) 32.5%; ▌Clement H. Van Worner (Populist) 5.3%; ▌Edward Berg (Prohibition) 4.1%; ▌William F. Button (Independent) 0.4%
Alabama 3	William C. Oates	Democratic	1880	Incumbent resigned November 5, 1894, after being elected Governor of Alabama. New member elected November 6, 1894. Democratic hold.	▌ ✓ George P. Harrison Jr. (Democratic); [data missing]
Kentucky 9	Thomas H. Paynter	Democratic	1888	Incumbent resigned January 5, 1895, having been elected to the Kentucky Court of Appeals. New member elected November 6, 1894 and seated March 4, 1895. Republican gain.	▌ ✓ Samuel J. Pugh (Republican); [data missing]
Maryland 5	Barnes Compton	Democratic	1884; 1890 (lost contest); 1890	Incumbent resigned May 15, 1894, to become a naval officer. New member elected November 6, 1894. Republican gain.	▌ ✓ Charles E. Coffin (Republican); [data missing]
Arkansas 2	Clifton R. Breckinridge	Democratic	1882	Incumbent resigned August 14, 1894, to become U.S. Minister to Russia. New member elected December 3, 1894. Democratic hold.	▌ ✓ John S. Little (Democratic); [data missing]
Kentucky 10	Marcus C. Lisle	Democratic	1892	Incumbent died July 7, 1894. New member elected December 3, 1894. Democratic hold.	▌ ✓ William M. Beckner (Democratic); [data missing]
Louisiana 4	Newton C. Blanchard	Democratic	1880	Incumbent resigned March 12, 1894, to become a U.S. Senator. New member elected December 3, 1894. Democratic hold.	▌ ✓ Henry W. Ogden (Democratic); [data missing]
Ohio 2	John A. Caldwell	Republican	1888	Incumbent resigned April 4, 1894, to become Mayor of Cincinnati. New member elected December 3, 1894. Republican hold.	▌ ✓ Jacob H. Bromwell (Republican); [data missing]
New York 15	Ashbel P. Fitch	Democratic	1886	Incumbent resigned December 26, 1893, to become New York City Comptroller. New member elected December 30, 1894. Democratic hold.	▌ ✓ Isidor Straus (Democratic); [data missing]

== Early election dates ==
In 1894, three states, with 8 seats among them, held elections early:

- June 4 Oregon
- September 4 Vermont
- September 10 Maine

== Alabama ==
District	Incumbent			This race	
District	Member	Party	First elected	Results	Candidates
Alabama 1	Richard H. Clarke	Democratic	1888	Incumbent re-elected.	▌ ✓ Richard H. Clarke (Democratic) 76.9%; ▌ [FNU] Sibley (Populist) 23.1%
Alabama 2	Jesse F. Stallings	Democratic	1892	Incumbent re-elected.	▌ ✓ Jesse F. Stallings (Democratic) 64.6%; ▌ [FNU] Gardner (Populist) 35.4%
Alabama 3	William C. Oates	Democratic	1880	Incumbent retired to run for governor and resigned when elected. Winner also elected to finish term. Democratic hold.	▌ ✓ George P. Harrison Jr. (Democratic) 65.2%; ▌ W. C. Robinson (Populist) 34.8%
Alabama 4	Gaston A. Robbins	Democratic	1892	Incumbent re-elected.	▌ ✓ Gaston A. Robbins (Democratic) 58.6%; ▌ William F. Aldrich (Republican/Populist) 41.4%
Alabama 4	Gaston A. Robbins	Democratic	1892	Election successfully contested. New member seated March 13, 1896. Republican gain.	▌ ✓ William F. Aldrich (Republican/Populist); ▌ Gaston A. Robbins (Democratic)
Alabama 5	James E. Cobb	Democratic	1886	Incumbent re-elected.	▌ ✓ James E. Cobb (Democratic) 51.8%; ▌ Albert T. Goodwyn (Populist) 48.2%
Alabama 5	James E. Cobb	Democratic	1886	Election successfully contested. New member seated April 21, 1896. Populist gain.	▌ ✓ Albert T. Goodwyn (Populist); ▌ James E. Cobb (Democratic)
Alabama 6	John H. Bankhead	Democratic	1886	Incumbent re-elected.	▌ ✓ John H. Bankhead (Democratic) 55.8%; ▌ [FNU] Sanford (Populist) 25.6%; ▌ [FNU] Long (Republican) 18.7%
Alabama 7	William H. Denson	Democratic	1892	Incumbent lost re-election. Populist gain.	▌ ✓ Milford W. Howard (Populist) 66.5%; ▌ William H. Denson (Democratic) 33.6%
Alabama 8	Joseph Wheeler	Democratic	1884	Incumbent re-elected.	▌ ✓ Joseph Wheeler (Democratic) 57.9%; ▌ Lee Crandall (Populist) 42.1%
Alabama 9	Louis W. Turpin	Democratic	1888	Incumbent lost renomination. Democratic hold.	▌ ✓ Oscar Underwood (Democratic) 54.3%; ▌ Truman H. Aldrich (Republican/Populist) 45.7%
Alabama 9	Louis W. Turpin	Democratic	1888	Election successfully contested. New member seated June 9, 1896. Republican gain.	▌ ✓ Truman H. Aldrich (Republican/Populist); ▌ Oscar Underwood (Democratic)

== Arkansas ==
District	Incumbent			This race	
District	Member	Party	First elected	Results	Candidates
Arkansas 1	Philip D. McCulloch Jr.	Democratic	1892	Incumbent re-elected.	▌ ✓ Philip D. McCulloch Jr. (Democratic) 81.8%; ▌ Russ Coffman (Populist) 17.6%
Arkansas 2	Clifton R. Breckinridge	Democratic	1888	Incumbent resigned to become U.S. Minister to Russia. Winner also elected to finish term. Democratic hold.	▌ ✓ John S. Little (Democratic) 94.5%; ▌ [FNU] Norris (Populist) 1.6%
Arkansas 3	Thomas C. McRae	Democratic	1885	Incumbent re-elected.	▌ ✓ Thomas C. McRae (Democratic) 97.1%
Arkansas 4	William L. Terry	Democratic	1890	Incumbent re-elected.	▌ ✓ William L. Terry (Democratic) 62.2%; ▌ P. Raleigh (Republican) 22.3%; ▌ J. H. Cherry (Populist) 15.4%
Arkansas 5	Hugh A. Dinsmore	Democratic	1892	Incumbent re-elected.	▌ ✓ Hugh A. Dinsmore (Democratic) 56.8%; ▌ T. J. Hunt (Republican) 37.5%; ▌ W. M. Peel (Populist) 5.7%
Arkansas 6	Robert Neill	Democratic	1892	Incumbent re-elected.	▌ ✓ Robert Neill (Democratic) 65.0%; ▌ H. H. Myers (Republican) 31.8%

== California ==
District	Incumbent			This race	
District	Member	Party	First elected	Results	Candidates
California 1	Thomas J. Geary	Democratic	1890	Incumbent lost re-election. Republican gain.	▌ ✓ John All Barham (Republican) 41.1%; ▌Thomas J. Geary (Democratic) 37.0%; ▌Roger F. Grigsby (Populist) 19.7%; ▌J. R. Gregory (Prohibition)
California 2	Anthony Caminetti	Democratic	1890	Incumbent lost re-election. Republican gain.	▌ ✓ Grove L. Johnson (Republican) 43.0%; ▌Anthony Caminetti (Democratic) 35.1%; ▌Burdelli Cornell (Populist) 20.0%; ▌Elam Briggs (Prohibition) 1.9%
California 3	Warren B. English	Democratic	1892 (contested)	Incumbent lost re-election. Republican gain.	▌ ✓ Samuel G. Hilborn (Republican) 45.5%; ▌Warren B. English (Democratic) 37.8%; ▌W. A. Vann (Populist) 14.9%; ▌L. B. Scranton (Prohibition) 1.8%
California 4	James G. Maguire	Democratic	1892	Incumbent re-elected.	▌ ✓ James G. Maguire (Democratic) 48.3%; ▌Thomas Bowles Shannon (Republican) 32.0%; ▌B. K. Collier (Populist) 18.4%; ▌Joseph Rowell (Prohibition) 1.3%
California 5	Eugene F. Loud	Republican	1890	Incumbent re-elected.	▌ ✓ Eugene F. Loud (Republican) 35.9%; ▌Joseph P. Kelly (Democratic) 22.5%; ▌James T. Rogers (Populist) 21.0%; ▌James Denman (Independent Democratic) 18.3%; ▌Robert Summers (Prohibition) 2.3%
California 6	Marion Cannon	Populist	1892	Incumbent retired. Republican gain.	▌ ✓ James McLachlan (Republican) 44.3%; ▌George S. Patton (Democratic) 27.6%; ▌W. C. Bowman (Populist) 23.1%; ▌J. E. McComas (Prohibition) 5.0%
California 7	William W. Bowers	Republican	1890	Incumbent re-elected.	▌ ✓ William W. Bowers (Republican) 42.9%; ▌William H. Alford (Democratic) 28.2%; ▌J. L. Gilbert (Populist) 25.0%; ▌W. H. Somers (Prohibition) 3.9%

== Colorado ==
District	Incumbent			This race	
District	Member	Party	First elected	Results	Candidates
Colorado 1	Lafe Pence	Populist	1894	Incumbent lost re-election. Republican gain.	▌ ✓ John F. Shafroth (Republican) 55.3%; ▌ Lafe Pence (Populist) 39.7%; ▌ Robert H. Rhodes (Prohibition) 2.9%; ▌ John T. Bottom (Democratic) 2.1%
Colorado 2	John C. Bell	Populist	1892	Incumbent re-elected.	▌ ✓ John C. Bell (Populist/Democratic) 51.7%; ▌ Thomas M. Bowen (Republican) 45.9%; ▌ William A. Rice (Prohibition) 2.2%; ▌ G. O. Pearce (Independent Labor) 0.2%

== Connecticut ==
District	Incumbent			This race	
District	Member	Party	First elected	Results	Candidates
Connecticut 1	Lewis Sperry	Democratic	1890	Incumbent lost re-election. Republican gain.	▌ ✓ E. Stevens Henry (Republican) 55.37%; ▌Lewis Sperry (Democratic) 41.18%; ▌Frederick Platt (Prohibition) 1.62%; ▌James Goodacre (Populist) 1.25%; ▌Samuel W. Taylor (Socialist Labor) 0.57%
Connecticut 2	James P. Pigott	Democratic	1892	Incumbent lost re-election. Republican gain.	▌ ✓ Nehemiah D. Sperry (Republican) 54.94%; ▌James P. Pigott (Democratic) 41.70%; ▌Henry C. Baldwin (Populist) 1.32%; ▌Duane N. Griffin (Prohibition) 1.15%; ▌Frederick Thornton (Socialist Labor) 0.90%
Connecticut 3	Charles A. Russell	Republican	1886	Incumbent re-elected.	▌ ✓ Charles A. Russell (Republican) 55.56%; ▌Cyrus G. Beckwith (Democratic) 41.56%; ▌Walter R. Denison (Prohibition) 2.19%; ▌James C. Vallette (Populist) 0.69%
Connecticut 4	Robert E. De Forest	Democratic	1890	Incumbent lost re-election. Republican gain.	▌ ✓ Ebenezer J. Hill (Republican) 55.19%; ▌Robert E. De Forest (Democratic) 42.66%; ▌William R. Miles (Prohibition) 1.10%; ▌William Sardam (Populist) 0.65%; ▌Alexander McDonald (Socialist Labor) 0.40%

== Delaware ==
District	Incumbent			This race	
District	Member	Party	First elected	Results	Candidates
Delaware at-large	John W. Causey	Democratic	1892	Incumbent retired. Republican gain.	▌ ✓ Jonathan S. Willis (Republican) 50.83%; ▌Samuel Bancroft (Democratic) 47.5%; ▌W. W. Bullock (Prohibition) 1.5%; ▌John P. Donahue (Ind. Democratic) 0.17%

== Florida ==
District	Incumbent			This race	
District	Member	Party	First elected	Results	Candidates
Florida 1	Stephen R. Mallory	Democratic	1890	Incumbent retired. Democratic hold.	▌ ✓ Stephen M. Sparkman (Democratic) 85.3%; ▌D. L. McKinnon (Populist) 14.7%
Florida 2	Charles Merian Cooper	Democratic	1892	Incumbent re-elected.	▌ ✓ Charles Merian Cooper (Democratic) 79.8%; ▌Montholom Atkinson (Populist) 20.2%

== Georgia ==
District	Incumbent			This race	
District	Member	Party	First elected	Results	Candidates
Georgia 1	Rufus E. Lester	Democratic	1888	Incumbent re-elected.	▌ ✓ Rufus E. Lester (Democratic) 72.0%; ▌ J. F. Brown (Populist) 28.0%
Georgia 2	Benjamin E. Russell	Democratic	1892	Incumbent re-elected.	▌ ✓ Benjamin E. Russell (Democratic) 62.4%; ▌ William E. Smith (Populist) 37.6%
Georgia 3	Charles F. Crisp	Democratic	1882	Incumbent re-elected.	▌ ✓ Charles F. Crisp (Democratic) 74.7%; ▌ George B. White (Populist) 25.3%
Georgia 4	Charles L. Moses	Democratic	1890	Incumbent re-elected.	▌ ✓ Charles L. Moses (Democratic) 57.4%; ▌ Carey Thornton (Populist) 42.6%
Georgia 5	Leonidas F. Livingston	Democratic	1890	Incumbent re-elected.	▌ ✓ Leonidas F. Livingston (Democratic) 59.7%; ▌ Robert Todd (Populist) 40.4%
Georgia 6	Thomas Banks Cabaniss	Democratic	1892	Incumbent lost renomination. Democratic hold.	▌ ✓ Charles L. Bartlett (Democratic) 65.5%; ▌ W. T. Whitaker (Populist) 34.5%
Georgia 7	John W. Maddox	Democratic	1892	Incumbent re-elected.	▌ ✓ John W. Maddox (Democratic) 54.4%; ▌ William H. Felton (Populist) 45.6%
Georgia 8	Thomas G. Lawson	Democratic	1890	Incumbent re-elected.	▌ ✓ Thomas G. Lawson (Democratic) 59.5%; ▌ W. T. Carter (Populist) 40.5%
Georgia 9	Farish Tate	Democratic	1892	Incumbent re-elected.	▌ ✓ Farish Tate (Democratic) 56.1%; ▌ J. N. Twitty (Populist) 43.9%
Georgia 10	James C. C. Black	Democratic	1892	Incumbent re-elected but resigned amidst a contested election.	▌ ✓ James C. C. Black (Democratic) 60.8%; ▌ Thomas E. Watson (Populist) 39.2%
Georgia 11	Henry G. Turner	Democratic	1880	Incumbent re-elected.	▌ ✓ Henry G. Turner (Democratic) 60.2%; ▌ W. S. Johnson (Populist) 39.8%

== Idaho ==
District	Incumbent			This race	
District	Member	Party	First elected	Results	Candidates
Idaho at-large	Willis Sweet	Republican	1890	Incumbent retired. Republican hold.	▌ ✓ Edgar Wilson (Republican) 43.38%; ▌James Gunn (Populist) 31.53%; ▌James M. Ballatine (Democratic) 24.37%; ▌William J. Boone (Prohibition) 0.72%

== Illinois ==
District	Incumbent			This race	
District	Member	Party	First elected	Results	Candidates
Illinois 1	J. Frank Aldrich	Republican	1892	Incumbent re-elected.	▌ ✓ J. Frank Aldrich (Republican) 63.2%; ▌ Max Dembufsky (Democratic) 23.9%; ▌ Howard S. Taylor (Populist) 11.2%; ▌ William H. Craig (Prohibition) 1.2%; ▌ Winfield S. McComas (A.P.A) 0.5%
Illinois 2	None (New district)			New district. Republican gain.	▌ ✓ William Lorimer (Republican) 45.6%; ▌ John J. Hanahan (Democratic) 36.2%; ▌ John Z. White (Populist) 18.2%
Illinois 3	Lawrence E. McGann; Redistricted from the 2nd district	Democratic	1892	Incumbent re-elected.	▌ ✓ Lawrence E. McGann (Democratic) 44.4%; ▌ Hugh R. Belknap (Republican) 44.3%; ▌ John B. Clarke (Populist) 11.4%
Illinois 3	Lawrence E. McGann; Redistricted from the 2nd district	Democratic	1892	Election successfully contested. New member seated December 27, 1895. Republican gain.	▌ ✓ Hugh R. Belknap (Republican); ▌ Lawrence E. McGann (Democratic); ▌ John B. Clarke (Populist)
Illinois 3	Allan C. Durborow Jr.	Democratic	1890	Incumbent retired. Democratic loss.	▌ ✓ Hugh R. Belknap (Republican); ▌ Lawrence E. McGann (Democratic); ▌ John B. Clarke (Populist)
Illinois 4	None (New district)			New district. Republican gain.	▌ ✓ Charles W. Woodman (Republican) 38.2%; ▌ Frank Lawler (Independent Democratic) 29.0%; ▌ T. E. Ryan (Democratic) 24.0%; ▌ Patrick J. Miniter (Populist) 7.7%; ▌ J. Simington (Prohibition) 1.1%
Illinois 5	None (New district)			New district. Republican gain.	▌ ✓ George E. White (Republican) 49.5%; ▌ Edward Thomas Noonan (Democratic) 39.3%; ▌ Charles G. Dixon (Populist) 10.9%
Illinois 6	Julius Goldzier; Redistricted from the 4th district	Democratic	1892	Incumbent lost re-election. Republican gain.	▌ ✓ Edward D. Cooke (Republican) 47.3%; ▌ Julius Goldzier (Democratic) 41.5%; ▌ Louis W. Rogers (Populist) 11.2%
Illinois 6	John C. Black; Redistricted from the at-large district	Democratic	1892	Incumbent resigned. Democratic loss.	▌ ✓ Edward D. Cooke (Republican) 47.3%; ▌ Julius Goldzier (Democratic) 41.5%; ▌ Louis W. Rogers (Populist) 11.2%
Illinois 7	None (New district)			New district. Republican gain.	▌ ✓ George E. Foss (Republican) 59.3%; ▌ Philip Jackson (Democratic) 26.6%; ▌ Henry Demarest Lloyd (Populist) 14.2%
Illinois 8	Albert J. Hopkins; Redistricted from the 5th district	Republican	1885	Incumbent re-elected.	▌ ✓ Albert J. Hopkins (Republican) 66.0%; ▌ Lewis Steward (Democratic) 26.6%; ▌ George W. Sindlinger (Prohibition) 4.4%; ▌ George S. Bowen (Populist) 3.0%
Illinois 8	Robert A. Childs	Republican	1892	Incumbent retired. Republican loss.	
Illinois 9	Robert R. Hitt; Redistricted from the 6th district	Republican	1882	Incumbent re-elected.	▌ ✓ Robert R. Hitt (Republican) 63.9%; ▌ David F. Thompson (Democratic) 29.9%; ▌ James Lamont (Prohibition) 3.5%; ▌ S. H. Zimmerman (Populist) 2.7%
Illinois 10	Philip S. Post	Republican	1886	Incumbent re-elected.	▌ ✓ Philip S. Post (Republican) 63.7%; ▌ Jones W. Olson (Democratic) 27.1%; ▌ William W. Matthews (Populist) 6.0%; ▌ Samuel T. Shirley (Prohibition) 3.2%
Illinois 11	Thomas J. Henderson; Redistricted from the 7th district	Republican	1874	Incumbent lost renomination. Republican hold.	▌ ✓ Walter Reeves (Republican) 52.3%; ▌ Robert R. Gibbons (Democratic) 38.8%; ▌ William M. Hirschy (Populist) 6.0%; ▌ Marion Gallupp (Prohibition) 2.9%
Illinois 12	Joseph Gurney Cannon; Redistricted from the 15th district	Republican	1892	Incumbent re-elected.	▌ ✓ Joseph Gurney Cannon (Republican) 59.4%; ▌ Thomas F. Donovan (Democratic) 33.5%; ▌ Samuel Levitt (Populist) 4.5%; ▌ E. T. Hays (Prohibition) 2.6%
Illinois 12	Hamilton K. Wheeler; Redistricted from the 9th district	Republican	1892	Incumbent retired. Republican loss.	▌ ✓ Joseph Gurney Cannon (Republican) 59.4%; ▌ Thomas F. Donovan (Democratic) 33.5%; ▌ Samuel Levitt (Populist) 4.5%; ▌ E. T. Hays (Prohibition) 2.6%
Illinois 13	Benjamin F. Funk; Redistricted from the 14th district	Republican	1892	Incumbent lost renomination. Republican hold.	▌ ✓ Vespasian Warner (Republican) 57.8%; ▌ A. J. Barr (Democratic) 35.2%; ▌ Wilfred N. Kellogg (Prohibition) 3.7%; ▌ Nathan M. Barnett (Populist) 3.3%
Illinois 14	None (New district)			New district. Republican gain.	▌ ✓ Joseph V. Graff (Republican) 51.2%; ▌ George O. Barnes (Democratic) 42.8%; ▌ William L. Heberling (Populist) 3.4%; ▌ David McCulloch (Prohibition) 2.0%; ▌ William G. Eggleston (Single-Tax) 0.6%
Illinois 15	Benjamin F. Marsh; Redistricted from the 11th district	Republican	1876	Incumbent re-elected.	▌ ✓ Benjamin F. Marsh (Republican) 48.4%; ▌ Truman Plantz (Democratic) 45.0%; ▌ [FNU] Greer (Populist) 3.6%; ▌ Samuel Woods (Prohibition) 3.0%
Illinois 16	John James McDannold; Redistricted from the 12th district	Democratic	1892	Incumbent retired. Democratic hold.	▌ ✓ Finis E. Downing (Democratic) 46.5%; ▌ John I. Rinaker (Republican) 46.4%; ▌ Peter D. Stout (Populist) 5.0%; ▌ M. M. Cooper (Prohibition) 2.1%
Illinois 16	John James McDannold; Redistricted from the 12th district	Democratic	1892	Election successfully contested. New member seated June 5, 1896. Republican gain.	▌ ✓ John I. Rinaker (Republican); ▌ Finis E. Downing (Democratic); ▌ Peter D. Stout (Populist); ▌ M. M. Cooper (Prohibition)
Illinois 17	William McKendree Springer; Redistricted from the 13th district	Democratic	1874	Incumbent lost re-election. Republican gain.	▌ ✓ James A. Connolly (Republican) 50.3%; ▌ William McKendree Springer (Democratic) 43.0%; ▌ [FNU] Crawford (Labor) 3.5%; ▌ Robert F. Smith (Prohibition) 3.2%
Illinois 18	Edward Lane; Redistricted from the 17th district	Democratic	1886	Incumbent lost re-election. Republican gain.	▌ ✓ Frederick Remann (Republican) 49.4%; ▌ Edward Lane (Democratic) 41.7%; ▌ Joseph S. Barnes (Populist) 6.0%; ▌ Thomas W. Hynes (Prohibition) 2.9%
Illinois 19	George W. Fithian; Redistricted from the 16th district	Democratic	1888	Incumbent lost re-election. Republican gain.	▌ ✓ Benson Wood (Republican) 48.2%; ▌ George W. Fithian (Democratic) 45.1%; ▌ Harvey M. Brooks (Populist) 4.8%; ▌ Henry B. Kepley (Prohibition) 1.9%
Illinois 19	Andrew J. Hunter; Redistricted from the at-large district	Democratic	1892	Incumbent lost renomination. Democratic loss.	▌ ✓ Benson Wood (Republican) 48.2%; ▌ George W. Fithian (Democratic) 45.1%; ▌ Harvey M. Brooks (Populist) 4.8%; ▌ Henry B. Kepley (Prohibition) 1.9%
Illinois 20	James R. Williams; Redistricted from the 19th district	Democratic	1889	Incumbent lost re-election. Republican gain.	▌ ✓ Orlando Burrell (Republican) 47.6%; ▌ James R. Williams (Democratic) 43.1%; ▌ Harvey G. Jones (Populist) 7.6%; ▌ W.C. Willey (Prohibition) 1.7%
Illinois 21	William S. Forman; Redistricted from the 18th district	Democratic	1888	Incumbent retired. Republican gain.	▌ ✓ Everett J. Murphy (Republican) 48.0%; ▌ John J. Higgins (Democratic) 43.4%; ▌ Henry C. McDill (Populist) 7.0%; ▌ James H. Sawyer (Prohibition) 1.6%
Illinois 22	George Washington Smith; Redistricted from the 20th district	Republican	1888	Incumbent re-elected.	▌ ✓ George Washington Smith (Republican) 57.4%; ▌ Francis M. Youngblood (Democratic) 33.4%; ▌ John J. Hall (Populist) 7.9%; ▌ Elder Calvin Allen (Prohibition) 1.3%

== Indiana ==
District	Incumbent			This race	
District	Member	Party	First elected	Results	Candidates
Indiana 1	Arthur H. Taylor	Democratic	1892	Incumbent lost re-election. Republican gain.	▌ ✓ James A. Hemenway (Republican) 47.8%; ▌ Arthur H. Taylor (Democratic) 42.5%; ▌ James A. Boyce (Populist) 8.9%; ▌ James C. Pruitt (Prohibition) 0.8%
Indiana 2	John L. Bretz	Democratic	1890	Incumbent lost re-election. Republican gain.	▌ ✓ Alexander M. Hardy (Republican) 47.6%; ▌ John L. Bretz (Democratic) 42.9%; ▌ Elisha A. Riggins (Populist) 8.7%; ▌ William J. Trout (Prohibition) 0.8%
Indiana 3	Jason B. Brown	Democratic	1888	Incumbent lost renomination. Republican gain.	▌ ✓ Robert J. Tracewell (Republican) 49.0%; ▌ Strother M. Stockslager (Democratic) 47.6%; ▌ Frank Garriatt (Populist) 2.8%; ▌ Samil Pfrimmer (Prohibition) 0.6%
Indiana 4	William S. Holman	Democratic	1880	Incumbent lost re-election. Republican gain.	▌ ✓ James E. Watson (Republican) 48.9%; ▌ William S. Holman (Democratic) 47.7%; ▌ [FNU] Gregg (Populist) 1.9%; ▌ Samuel V. Wright (Prohibition) 1.5%
Indiana 5	George W. Cooper	Democratic	1888	Incumbent lost re-election. Republican gain.	▌ ✓ Jesse Overstreet (Republican) 49.5%; ▌ George W. Cooper (Democratic) 44.4%; ▌ L. Deturk (Populist) 4.2%; ▌ Elihu F. Barker (Prohibition) 1.9%
Indiana 6	Henry U. Johnson	Republican	1890	Incumbent re-elected.	▌ ✓ Henry U. Johnson (Republican) 63.1%; ▌ Nimrod R. Elliott (Democratic) 29.7%; ▌ [FNU] Harris (Populist) 4.5%; ▌ Robert B. Lindsey (Prohibition) 2.7%
Indiana 7	William D. Bynum	Democratic	1884	Incumbent lost re-election. Republican gain.	▌ ✓ Jesse Overstreet (Republican) 51.1%; ▌ William D. Bynum (Democratic) 43.7%; ▌ [FNU] East (Populist) 4.1%; ▌ Brazillai M. Blount (Prohibition) 1.1%
Indiana 8	Elijah V. Brookshire	Democratic	1888	Incumbent lost re-election. Republican gain.	▌ ✓ George W. Faris (Republican) 48.0%; ▌ Elijah V. Brookshire (Democratic) 42.7%; ▌ Morton C. Rankin (Populist) 7.6%; ▌ Albert W. Jackman (Prohibition) 1.7%
Indiana 9	Daniel W. Waugh	Republican	1890	Incumbent retired. Republican hold.	▌ ✓ Frank Hanly (Republican) 54.1%; ▌ Alonzo G. Burkhart (Democratic/Populist) 43.0%; ▌ Leander M. Crist (Prohibition) 2.9%
Indiana 10	Thomas Hammond	Democratic	1892	Incumbent retired. Republican gain.	▌ ✓ Jethro A. Hatch (Republican) 51.0%; ▌ Valentine Zimmerman (Democratic) 41.4%; ▌ Samuel M. Hathorn (Populist) 5.6%; ▌ Hans C. Hanson (Prohibition) 2.0%
Indiana 11	Augustus N. Martin	Democratic	1888	Incumbent retired. Republican gain.	▌ ✓ George Washington Steele (Republican) 50.1%; ▌ Augustus N. Martin (Democratic) 42.2%; ▌ [FNU] Benson (Populist) 4.7%; ▌ William E. Chambers (Prohibition) 3.0%
Indiana 12	William F. McNagny	Democratic	1892	Incumbent lost re-election. Republican gain.	▌ ✓ Jacob D. Leighty (Republican) 49.9%; ▌ William F. McNagny (Democratic) 43.5%; ▌ Freeman Kelly (Populist) 5.6%; ▌ James E. Graham (Prohibition) 1.0%
Indiana 13	Charles G. Conn	Democratic	1892	Incumbent retired. Republican gain.	▌ ✓ Lemuel W. Royse (Republican) 52.3%; ▌ Lewellyn Wanner (Democratic) 43.1%; ▌ [FNU] Forest (Populist) 2.9%; ▌ Abraham Huntsinger (Prohibition) 1.7%

== Iowa ==
District	Incumbent			This race	
District	Member	Party	First elected	Results	Candidates
Iowa 1	John H. Gear	Republican	1892	Incumbent retired to run for U.S. Senator. Republican hold.	▌ ✓ Samuel M. Clark (Republican) 51.9%; ▌ W. A. Buckworth (Democratic) 40.6%; ▌ J. O. Bube (Populist) 6.1%; ▌ Isaac T. Gibson (Prohibition) 1.4%
Iowa 2	Walter I. Hayes	Democratic	1886	Incumbent lost re-election. Republican gain.	▌ ✓ George M. Curtis (Republican) 48.4%; ▌ Walter I. Hayes (Democratic) 47.2%; ▌ Charles A. Lloyd (Populist) 4.1%; ▌ N. J. Kremer (Prohibition) 0.3%
Iowa 3	David B. Henderson	Republican	1882	Incumbent re-elected.	▌ ✓ David B. Henderson (Republican) 57.1%; ▌ Stephen H. Bashor (Democratic/Populist) 42.9%
Iowa 4	Thomas Updegraff	Republican	1892	Incumbent re-elected.	▌ ✓ Thomas Updegraff (Republican) 57.4%; ▌ James F. Babcock (Democratic) 37.2%; ▌ [FNU] Weller (Populist) 3.5%; ▌ M. H. Daley (Prohibition) 1.9%
Iowa 5	Robert G. Cousins	Republican	1892	Incumbent re-elected.	▌ ✓ Robert G. Cousins (Republican) 55.2%; ▌ William P. Daniels (Democratic) 40.2%; ▌ William H. Calhoun (Populist) 3.2%; ▌ J. M. Hamilton (Prohibition) 1.4%
Iowa 6	John F. Lacey	Republican	1892	Incumbent re-elected.	▌ ✓ John F. Lacey (Republican) 50.9%; ▌ W. H. Taylor (Democratic) 32.0%; ▌ Allen Clark (Populist) 15.7%; ▌ George Gilchrist (Prohibition) 1.4%
Iowa 7	John A. T. Hull	Republican	1890	Incumbent re-elected.	▌ ✓ John A. T. Hull (Republican) 60.9%; ▌ J. R. Barcroft (Democratic/Populist) 39.1%
Iowa 8	William P. Hepburn	Republican	1892	Incumbent re-elected.	▌ ✓ William P. Hepburn (Republican) 55.3%; ▌ Frank G. Stuart (Democratic/Populist) 44.7%
Iowa 9	Alva L. Hager	Republican	1892	Incumbent re-elected.	▌ ✓ Alva L. Hager (Republican) 53.3%; ▌ James B. Weaver (Democratic/Populist) 45.8%; ▌ W. H. Parker (Prohibition) 0.9%
Iowa 10	Jonathan P. Dolliver	Republican	1888	Incumbent re-elected.	▌ ✓ Jonathan P. Dolliver (Republican) 59.9%; ▌ J. C. Baker (Democratic/Populist) 40.01; ▌ M. W. Atwood (Prohibition) 0.6%
Iowa 11	George D. Perkins	Republican	1890	Incumbent re-elected.	▌ ✓ George D. Perkins (Republican) 54.7%; ▌ Bernard Graiser (Democratic) 30.3%; ▌ J. L. Bartholomew (Populist) 12.8%; ▌ H.T. Sutton (Prohibition) 2.2%

== Kansas ==
District	Incumbent			This race	
District	Member	Party	First elected	Results	Candidates
Kansas 1	Case Broderick	Republican	1890	Incumbent re-elected.	▌ ✓ Case Broderick (Republican) 54.2%; ▌ H. C. Solomon (Populist/Democratic) 44.7%; ▌ L. A. Stone (Prohibition) 1.1%
Kansas 2	Horace Ladd Moore	Democratic	1892	Incumbent lost re-election. Republican gain.	▌ ✓ Orrin L. Miller (Republican) 53.9%; ▌ F. A. Willard (Populist) 32.7%; ▌ Horace Ladd Moore (Democratic) 11.3%; ▌ N. H. Hopkins (Prohibition) 2.1%
Kansas 3	Thomas Jefferson Hudson	Populist	1892	Incumbent retired. Republican gain.	▌ ✓ Snyder S. Kirkpatrick (Republican) 49.3%; ▌ Jeremiah D. Botkin (Populist) 44.2%; ▌ William Frederick Sapp (Democratic) 6.4%; ▌ W. S. Newton (Prohibition) 0.1%
Kansas 4	Charles Curtis	Republican	1892	Incumbent re-elected.	▌ ✓ Charles Curtis (Republican) 53.3%; ▌ S. M. Scott (Populist) 39.8%; ▌ Thomas J. O'Neil (Democratic) 5.4%; ▌ E. Leonardson (Prohibition) 1.5%
Kansas 5	John Davis	Populist	1890	Incumbent lost re-election. Republican gain.	▌ ✓ William A. Calderhead (Republican) 49.1%; ▌ John Davis (Populist) 42.1%; ▌ C. W. Brandenburg (Democratic) 7.4%; ▌ F. M. Durkee (Prohibition) 1.4%
Kansas 6	William Baker	Populist	1890	Incumbent re-elected.	▌ ✓ William Baker (Populist) 45.7%; ▌ Abram H. Ellis (Republican) 45.1%; ▌ Roscoe G. Heard (Democratic) 8.1%; ▌ Benjamin Brewer (Prohibition) 1.1%
Kansas 7	Jerry Simpson	Populist	1890	Incumbent lost re-election. Republican gain.	▌ ✓ Chester I. Long (Republican) 50.9%; ▌ Jerry Simpson (Populist/Democratic) 47.2%; ▌ E. F. Neal (Prohibition) 1.9%
Kansas at-large	William A. Harris	Populist	1892	Incumbent lost re-election. Republican gain.	▌ ✓ Richard W. Blue (Republican) 50.4%; ▌ William A. Harris (Populist) 39.0%; ▌ Joseph G. Lowe (Democratic) 8.9%; ▌ Frank Holsinger (Prohibition) 1.7%

== Kentucky ==
District	Incumbent			This race	
District	Member	Party	First elected	Results	Candidates
Kentucky 1	William Johnson Stone	Democratic	1884	Incumbent retired. Democratic hold.	▌ ✓ John K. Hendrick (Democratic) 49.8%; ▌ Ben C. Keys (Populist) 38.7%; ▌ W. J. Chitwood (Republican) 9.7%; ▌ Josiah Harris (Prohibition) 1.8%
Kentucky 2	William T. Ellis	Democratic	1888	Incumbent retired. Democratic hold.	▌ ✓ John D. Clardy (Democratic) 46.8%; ▌ Elijah G. Sebree Jr. (Republican) 36.3%; ▌ Henry Turner (Populist) 15.3%; ▌ James M. Holmes (Prohibition) 1.6%
Kentucky 3	Isaac Goodnight	Democratic	1888	Incumbent retired. Republican gain.	▌ ✓ W. Godfrey Hunter (Republican) 49.7%; ▌ C. U. McElroy (Democratic) 47.0%
Kentucky 4	Alexander B. Montgomery	Democratic	1886	Incumbent lost re-election. Republican gain.	▌ ✓ John W. Lewis (Republican) 51.0%; ▌ Alexander B. Montgomery (Democratic) 47.4%; ▌ Benjamin J. Sympson (Prohibition) 1.6%
Kentucky 5	Asher G. Caruth	Democratic	1886	Incumbent lost renomination. Republican gain.	▌ ✓ Walter Evans (Republican) 54.5%; ▌ Edward J. McDermott (Democratic) 43.6%; ▌ J. W. Sawyer (Prohibition) 1.4%; ▌ Francis Rectenwald (Populist) 0.5%
Kentucky 6	Albert S. Berry	Democratic	1892	Incumbent re-elected.	▌ ✓ Albert S. Berry (Democratic) 52.1%; ▌ Thomas B. Matthews (Republican) 44.5%; ▌ Franklin Sanford (Populist) 3.4%
Kentucky 7	W. C. P. Breckinridge	Democratic	1884	Incumbent retired. Democratic hold.	▌ ✓ William Claiborne Owens (Democratic) 48.7%; ▌ George Denny Jr. (Republican) 48.4%; ▌ James B. Finnell (Prohibition) 2.0%; ▌ Louis S. Johnston (Populist) 0.9%
Kentucky 8	James B. McCreary	Democratic	1884	Incumbent re-elected.	▌ ✓ James B. McCreary (Democratic) 50.6%; ▌ Philip Roberts (Republican) 45.4%; ▌ T. B. Demaree (Prohibition) 2.8%; ▌ [FNU] Thomas (Populist) 1.2%
Kentucky 9	Thomas H. Paynter	Democratic	1888	Incumbent retired and resigned when elected to the Kentucky Court of Appeals. Republican gain.	▌ ✓ Samuel J. Pugh (Republican) 50.2%; ▌ Rawleigh K. Hart (Democratic) 48.4%; ▌ [FNU] Blair (Populist) 1.3%; ▌ R. B. Neal (Prohibition) 0.1%
Kentucky 10	William M. Beckner	Democratic	1894	Incumbent lost renomination. Democratic hold.	▌ ✓ Joseph M. Kendall (Democratic) 50.4%; ▌ Nathan T. Hopkins (Republican) 49.6%
Kentucky 10	William M. Beckner	Democratic	1894	Election successfully contested. Incumbent re-elected and seated February 18, 1897. Republican gain.	▌ ✓ Nathan T. Hopkins (Republican); ▌Joseph M. Kendall (Democratic)
Kentucky 11	Silas Adams	Republican	1892	Incumbent lost renomination and lost re-election as an independent. Republican hold.	▌ ✓ David G. Colson (Republican) 47.7%; ▌ George E. Stone (Democratic) 35.6%; ▌ Silas Adams (Independent Republican) 16.2%

== Louisiana ==
District	Incumbent			This race	
District	Member	Party	First elected	Results	Candidates
Louisiana 1	Adolph Meyer	Democratic	1890	Incumbent re-elected.	▌ ✓ Adolph Meyer (Democratic) 65.5%; ▌ H. P. Kernochan (Republican) 32.6%; ▌ [FNU] Leonard (Socialist Labor) 1.9%
Louisiana 2	Robert C. Davey	Democratic	1892	Incumbent retired. Democratic hold.	▌ ✓ Charles F. Buck (Democratic) 66.8%; ▌ Hamilton D. Coleman (Republican) 32.4%; ▌ [FNU] Callaghan (Labor) 0.8%
Louisiana 3	Andrew Price	Democratic	1889	Incumbent re-elected.	▌ ✓ Andrew Price (Democratic) 60.8%; ▌ Taylor Beattie (Republican) 36.5%; ▌ [FNU] Lightner (Populist) 2.7%
Louisiana 4	Henry Warren Ogden	Democratic	1894	Incumbent re-elected.	▌ ✓ Henry Warren Ogden (Democratic) 67.4%; ▌ B. W. Bailey (Populist) 32.6%
Louisiana 5	Charles J. Boatner	Democratic	1888	Incumbent re-elected but house later declared seat vacant after election was contested.	▌ ✓ Charles J. Boatner (Democratic) 76.4%; ▌ Alexis Benoit (Populist) 23.6%
Louisiana 6	Samuel M. Robertson	Democratic	1887	Incumbent re-elected.	▌ ✓ Samuel M. Robertson (Democratic) 78.2%; ▌ M. R. Wilson (Populist) 21.8%

== Maine ==
District	Incumbent			This race	
District	Member	Party	First elected	Results	Candidates
Maine 1	Thomas B. Reed	Republican	1876	Incumbent re-elected.	▌ ✓ Thomas B. Reed (Republican) 63.53%; ▌John Deering (Democratic) 33.10%; ▌Linus Seely (Prohibition) 2.20%; ▌James E. Campion (Populist) 1.17%
Maine 2	Nelson Dingley Jr.	Republican	1881 (special)	Incumbent re-elected.	▌ ✓ Nelson Dingley Jr. (Republican) 63.74%; ▌Daniel J. McGillicuddy (Democratic) 28.38%; ▌Elbert Y. Turner (Populist) 5.96%; ▌Edward W. Ogier (Prohibition) 1.92%
Maine 3	Seth L. Milliken	Republican	1882	Incumbent re-elected.	▌ ✓ Seth L. Milliken (Republican) 64.78%; ▌Moses R. Leighton (Democratic) 25.55%; ▌George C. Sheldon (Populist) 7.62%; ▌William S. Thompson (Prohibition) 2.05%
Maine 4	Charles A. Boutelle	Republican	1882	Incumbent re-elected.	▌ ✓ Charles A. Boutelle (Republican) 65.46%; ▌Al L. Simpson (Democratic) 25.90%; ▌Oliver D. Chapman (Populist) 4.98%; ▌Charles W. Johnston (Prohibition) 3.66%

== Maryland ==
District	Incumbent			This race	
District	Member	Party	First elected	Results	Candidates
Maryland 1	Winder Laird Henry	Democratic	1894	Incumbent retired. Democratic hold.	▌ ✓ Joshua W. Miles (Democratic) 46.5%; ▌ A. Lincoln Dryden (Republican) 43.1%; ▌ Bennett P. Miles (Prohibition) 9.1%; ▌ B. P. Miles (Populist) 1.3%
Maryland 2	J. Frederick C. Talbott	Democratic	1892	Incumbent lost re-election. Republican gain.	▌ ✓ William Benjamin Baker (Republican) 48.0%; ▌ J. Frederick C. Talbott (Democratic) 47.5%; ▌ John Parker (Prohibition) 4.5%
Maryland 3	Harry W. Rusk	Democratic	1886	Incumbent re-elected.	▌ ✓ Harry W. Rusk (Democratic) 49.8%; ▌ William S. Booze (Republican) 48.2%; ▌ William J. H. Gluck (Prohibition) 2.0%
Maryland 4	Isidor Rayner	Democratic	1894	Incumbent retired. Democratic hold.	▌ ✓ John K. Cowen (Democratic) 50.5%; ▌ Robert Smith (Republican) 47.5%; ▌ T. M. Prentiss (Prohibition) 2.0%
Maryland 5	Barnes Compton	Democratic	1890	Incumbent resigned. Winner also elected to finish term. Republican gain.	▌ ✓ Charles E. Coffin (Republican) 52.0%; ▌ John Rogers (Democratic) 45.2%; ▌ William H. Silk (Prohibition) 1.6%; ▌ [FNU] Burchard (Populist) 1.2%
Maryland 6	William McMahon McKaig	Democratic	1890	Incumbent retired. Republican gain.	▌ ✓ George L. Wellington (Republican) 52.1%; ▌ Frederick Williams (Democratic) 44.2%; ▌ Albert E. Shoemaker (Prohibition) 2.9%; ▌ [FNU] Kiracofe (Populist) 0.8%

== Massachusetts ==
District	Incumbent			This race	
District	Member	Party	First elected	Results	Candidates
Massachusetts 1	Ashley B. Wright	Republican	1892	Incumbent re-elected.	▌ ✓ Ashley B. Wright (Republican) 55.2%; ▌Addison L. Green (Democratic) 39.2%; ▌Augustus R. Smith (Prohibition) 3.3%; ▌Jonathan Johnson (Populist) 2.3%
Massachusetts 2	Frederick H. Gillett	Republican	1892	Incumbent re-elected.	▌ ✓ Frederick H. Gillett (Republican) 61.4%; ▌Edward A. Hall (Democratic) 31.4%; ▌George M. Stearns (Populist) 4.2%; ▌Hubbard Lawrence (Prohibition) 3.0%
Massachusetts 3	Joseph H. Walker	Republican	1888	Incumbent re-elected.	▌ ✓ Joseph H. Walker (Republican) 59.4%; ▌Charles Haggerty (Democratic) 35.6%; ▌Henry S. Brown (Populist) 2.55%; ▌George F. Wright (Prohibition) 2.45%
Massachusetts 4	Lewis D. Apsley	Republican	1892	Incumbent re-elected.	▌ ✓ Lewis D. Apsley (Republican) 64.9%; ▌John J. Desmond (Democratic) 32.2%; ▌Bertram Sparhawk (Populist) 3.0%
Massachusetts 5	Moses T. Stevens	Democratic	1890	Incumbent retired. Republican gain.	▌ ✓ William S. Knox (Republican) 51.7%; ▌George W. Fifield (Democratic) 44.4%; ▌Hiram W. Eastman (Populist) 2.7%; ▌Warren F. Taylor (Prohibition) 1.1%
Massachusetts 6	William Cogswell	Republican	1886	Incumbent re-elected.	▌ ✓ William Cogswell (Republican) 68.3%; ▌Henry B. Little (Democratic) 24.2%; ▌Joseph K. Harris (Populist) 7.5%
Massachusetts 7	William Everett	Democratic	1893 (special)	Incumbent retired. Republican gain.	▌ ✓ William Emerson Barrett (Republican) 57.8%; ▌Samuel K. Hamilton (Democratic) 33.7%; ▌Walter L. Ramsdell (Populist) 4.6%; ▌George Buttrick (Prohibition) 2.9%; ▌George R. Peare (Socialist Labor) 1.1%
Massachusetts 8	Samuel W. McCall	Republican	1892	Incumbent re-elected.	▌ ✓ Samuel W. McCall (Republican) 57.8%; ▌Charles Arthur Conant (Democratic) 35.4%; ▌Linn B. Porter (Populist) 3.1%
Massachusetts 9	Joseph H. O'Neil	Democratic	1888	Incumbent lost renomination. Democratic hold.	▌ ✓ John F. Fitzgerald (Democratic) 53.3%; ▌Jesse M. Gove (Republican) 44.4%; ▌Patrick F. O'Neil (Socialist Labor) 2.4%
Massachusetts 10	Michael J. McEttrick	Citizens; Democratic	1892	Incumbent lost re-election. New member elected Republican gain.	▌ ✓ Harrison H. Atwood (Republican) 36.0%; ▌Michael J. McEttrick (Citizens Democratic) 35.4%; ▌William S. McNary (Democratic) 26.0%; ▌Frederick W. Peabody (Ind. Republican) 4.3%; ▌Michael D. Fitzgerald (Socialist Labor) 1.2%
Massachusetts 11	William F. Draper	Republican	1892	Incumbent re-elected.	▌ ✓ William F. Draper (Republican) 62.0%; ▌Bentley W. Warren (Democratic) 34.7%; ▌John F. Dowd (Populist) 3.4%
Massachusetts 12	Elijah A. Morse	Republican	1888	Incumbent re-elected.	▌ ✓ Elijah A. Morse (Republican) 65.3%; ▌William H. Jordan (Democratic) 26.2%; ▌E. Gerry Brown (Populist) 8.5%
Massachusetts 13	Charles S. Randall	Republican	1888	Incumbent lost renomination. Republican hold.	▌ ✓ John Simpkins (Republican) 61.2%; ▌Robert Howard (Democratic) 38.8%

== Michigan ==
District	Incumbent			This race	
District	Member	Party	First elected	Results	Candidates
Michigan 1	Levi T. Griffin	Democratic	1893	Incumbent lost re-election. Republican gain.	▌ ✓ John Blaisdell Corliss (Republican) 55.5%; ▌ Levi T. Griffin (Democratic) 39.7%; ▌ John M. McGregor (Populist) 1.8%; ▌ Charles Erb (Workers) 1.4%; ▌ James H. Dunn (Labor) 0.9%; ▌ William H. Venn (Prohibition) 0.7%
Michigan 2	James S. Gorman	Democratic	1890	Incumbent retired. Republican gain.	▌ ✓ George Spalding (Republican) 54.7%; ▌ Thomas E. Barkworth (Democratic/Populist) 40.6%; ▌ David W. Grandon (Prohibition) 4.7%
Michigan 3	Julius C. Burrows	Republican	1884	Incumbent re-elected but resigned when elected U.S. Senator.	▌ ✓ Julius C. Burrows (Republican) 58.7%; ▌ Nathaniel H. Stewart (Democratic) 23.6%; ▌ Frederick Lackore (Populist) 11.3%; ▌ Lucian W. Underwood (Prohibition) 6.5%
Michigan 4	Henry F. Thomas	Republican	1892	Incumbent re-elected.	▌ ✓ Henry F. Thomas (Republican) 58.8%; ▌ Leroy F. Weaver (Democratic) 26.7%; ▌ Sullivan W. Cook (Populist) 10.1%; ▌ Milton Chase (Prohibition) 4.4%
Michigan 5	George F. Richardson	Democratic	1892	Incumbent retired. Republican gain.	▌ ✓ William Alden Smith (Republican) 58.5%; ▌ Gideon L. Rutherford (Democratic) 30.5%; ▌ Josiah Tibbitts (Populist) 6.4%; ▌ Myron H. Walker (Prohibition) 4.6%
Michigan 6	David D. Aitken	Republican	1892	Incumbent re-elected.	▌ ✓ David D. Aitken (Republican) 57.3%; ▌ Elliott R. Wilcox (Democratic) 34.6%; ▌ Thomas C. Williams (Prohibition) 6.0%; ▌ Azariah S. Partridge (Populist) 2.1%
Michigan 7	Justin R. Whiting	Democratic	1886	Incumbent retired. Republican gain.	▌ ✓ Horace G. Snover (Republican) 54.6%; ▌ Ezra C. Carleton (Democratic) 37.1%; ▌ Carlton Peck (Populist) 4.9%; ▌ Benjamin H. Thurston (Prohibition) 3.4%
Michigan 8	William S. Linton	Republican	1892	Incumbent re-elected.	▌ ✓ William S. Linton (Republican) 54.1%; ▌ Rowland Connor (Democratic) 33.0%; ▌ Poe R. Crosby (Populist) 5.8%; ▌ Emery L. Brewer (Prohibition) 5.1%
Michigan 9	John W. Moon	Republican	1892	Incumbent retired. Republican hold.	▌ ✓ Roswell P. Bishop (Republican) 58.4%; ▌ William T. Evans (Democratic) 26.5%; ▌ Norman B. Farnsworth (Populist) 10.3%; ▌ Erastus C. Herrington (Prohibition) 4.8%
Michigan 10	Thomas A. E. Weadock	Democratic	1890	Incumbent retired. Republican gain.	▌ ✓ Rousseau O. Crump (Republican) 52.6%; ▌ Worthy L. Churchill (Democratic) 40.2%; ▌ Alexander Forsyth (Populist) 6.9%; ▌ Joseph Leighton (Prohibition) 0.3%
Michigan 11	John Avery	Republican	1892	Incumbent re-elected.	▌ ✓ John Avery (Republican) 62.2%; ▌ Hiram B. Hudson (Democratic) 20.7%; ▌ William T. Pitt (Populist) 11.6%; ▌ Austin Barber (Prohibition) 5.5%
Michigan 12	Samuel M. Stephenson	Republican	1888	Incumbent re-elected.	▌ ✓ Carlos D. Shelden (Republican) 64.0%; ▌ Rush Culver (Democratic) 27.0%; ▌ Andrew E. Anderson (Populist) 9.3%

== Minnesota ==
District	Incumbent			This race	
District	Member	Party	First elected	Results	Candidates
Minnesota 1	James A. Tawney	Republican	1892	Incumbent re-elected.	▌ ✓ James A. Tawney (Republican) 58.0%; ▌John Moonan (Democratic) 26.8%; ▌Thomas J. Meighen (Populist) 12.0%; ▌Isaac H. Orcutt (Prohibition) 3.2%
Minnesota 2	James McCleary	Republican	1892	Incumbent re-elected.	▌ ✓ James McCleary (Republican) 54.0%; ▌Lionel C. Long (Populist) 24.2%; ▌James H. Baker (Democratic) 18.4%; ▌Edward H. Bronson (Prohibition) 3.5%
Minnesota 3	Osee M. Hall	Democratic	1890	Incumbent lost re-election. Republican gain.	▌ ✓ Joel Heatwole (Republican) 49.2%; ▌Osee M. Hall (Democratic) 35.9%; ▌James M. Bowler (Populist) 12.6%; ▌Lucian Chaney (Prohibition) 2.4%
Minnesota 4	Andrew Kiefer	Republican	1892	Incumbent re-elected.	▌ ✓ Andrew Kiefer (Republican) 56.5%; ▌Edward Darragh (Democratic) 28.0%; ▌Francis H. Clark (Populist) 13.9%; ▌David Morgan (Prohibition) 1.6%
Minnesota 5	Loren Fletcher	Republican	1892	Incumbent re-elected.	▌ ✓ Loren Fletcher (Republican) 51.1%; ▌Oliver Erickson (Democratic) 28.7%; ▌Ernest F. Clark (Populist) 17.6%; ▌Theodore Reimstad (Prohibition) 2.6%
Minnesota 6	Melvin Baldwin	Democratic	1892	Incumbent lost re-election. Republican gain.	▌ ✓ Charles A. Towne (Republican) 53.3%; ▌Melvin Baldwin (Democratic) 33.1%; ▌Kittel Halvorson (Populist) 13.6%
Minnesota 7	Haldor Boen	Populist	1892	Incumbent lost re-election. Republican gain.	▌ ✓ Frank Eddy (Republican) 43.5%; ▌Haldor Boen (Populist) 41.6%; ▌Thomas McLean (Democratic) 8.3%; ▌Ole Kron (Prohibition) 6.5%

== Mississippi ==
District	Incumbent			This race	
District	Member	Party	First elected	Results	Candidates
Mississippi 1	John M. Allen	Democratic	1884	Incumbent re-elected.	▌ ✓ John M. Allen (Democratic) 79.03%; ▌J. A. Brown (Populist) 20.97%
Mississippi 2	John C. Kyle	Democratic	1890	Incumbent re-elected.	▌ ✓ John C. Kyle (Democratic) 75.30%; ▌R. J. Lyle (Populist) 20.90%; ▌W. R. Montgomery (Republican) 3.23%; ▌N. W. Brown (Prohibition) 0.57%
Mississippi 3	Thomas C. Catchings	Democratic	1884	Incumbent re-elected.	▌ ✓ Thomas C. Catchings (Democratic) 87.06%; ▌Thomas Monuh (Prohibition) 10.63%; ▌G. W. Wise (Populist) 2.31%
Mississippi 4	Hernando Money	Democratic	1892	Incumbent re-elected.	▌ ✓ Hernando Money (Democratic) 57.88%; ▌J. H. Jamison (Populist) 41.65%; ▌Frank Sourer (Prohibition) 0.47%
Mississippi 5	John S. Williams	Democratic	1892	Incumbent re-elected.	▌ ✓ John S. Williams (Democratic) 66.27%; ▌W. P. Ratliff (Populist) 33.73%
Mississippi 6	T. R. Stockdale	Democratic	1886	Incumbent lost renomination. Democratic hold.	▌ ✓ Walter M. Denny (Democratic) 64.64%; ▌A. C. Hathorn (Populist) 35.36%
Mississippi 7	Charles E. Hooker	Democratic	1886	Incumbent retired. Democratic hold.	▌ ✓ James G. Spencer (Democratic) 70.19%; ▌A. M. Newman (Populist) 26.44%; ▌T. P. Barr (Prohibition) 3.38%

== Missouri ==
District	Incumbent			This race	
District	Member	Party	First elected	Results	Candidates
Missouri 1	William H. Hatch	Democratic	1878	Incumbent lost re-election. Republican gain.	▌ ✓ Charles N. Clark (Republican) 44.3%; ▌ William H. Hatch (Democratic) 43.1%; ▌ John M. London (Populist) 12.0%; ▌ Winfield S. Little (Prohibition) 0.6%
Missouri 2	Uriel S. Hall	Democratic	1892	Incumbent re-elected.	▌ ✓ Uriel S. Hall (Democratic) 48.8%; ▌ Charles. A. Loomis (Republican) 43.8%; ▌ John C. Goodson (Populist) 7.5%
Missouri 3	Alexander M. Dockery	Democratic	1882	Incumbent re-elected.	▌ ✓ Alexander M. Dockery (Democratic) 44.5%; ▌ Hobart G. Orton (Republican) 43.6%; ▌ James C. Penny (Populist) 11.1%; ▌ Julius C. Hughes (Prohibition) 0.8%
Missouri 4	Daniel D. Burnes	Democratic	1892	Incumbent retired. Republican gain.	▌ ✓ George C. Crowther (Republican) 47.8%; ▌ William C. Ellison (Democratic) 42.7%; ▌ William S. Messimer (Populist) 8.9%; ▌ Sylvester. S. Manley (Prohibition) 0.6%
Missouri 5	John C. Tarsney	Democratic	1888	Incumbent re-elected.	▌ ✓ John C. Tarsney (Democratic) 47.3%; ▌ Robert T. Van Horn (Republican) 45.2%; ▌ John S. Crosby (Populist) 7.3%; ▌ Benjamin P. White (Prohibition) 0.2%
Missouri 5	John C. Tarsney	Democratic	1888	Election successfully contested. New member seated February 27, 1896. Republican gain.	▌ ✓ Robert T. Van Horn (Republican); ▌ ✓ John C. Tarsney (Democratic); ▌ John S. Crosby (Populist); ▌ Benjamin P. White (Prohibition)
Missouri 6	David A. De Armond	Democratic	1890	Incumbent re-elected.	▌ ✓ David A. De Armond (Democratic) 40.7%; ▌ Robert E. Lewis (Republican) 40.4%; ▌ Albert E. Francisco (Populist) 18.9%
Missouri 7	John T. Heard	Democratic	1884	Incumbent lost re-election. Republican gain.	▌ ✓ John P. Tracey (Republican) 45.5%; ▌ John T. Heard (Democratic) 44.7%; ▌ George T. Tippin (Populist) 9.1%; ▌ Van B. Wisker (Prohibition) 0.7%
Missouri 8	Richard P. Bland	Democratic	1872	Incumbent lost re-election. Republican gain.	▌ ✓ Joel D. Hubbard (Republican) 45.4%; ▌ Richard P. Bland (Democratic) 45.2%; ▌ William C. Alldredge (Populist) 9.5%
Missouri 9	Champ Clark	Democratic	1892	Incumbent lost re-election. Republican gain.	▌ ✓ William M. Treloar (Republican) 49.2%; ▌ Champ Clark (Democratic) 48.8%; ▌ Joseph Moore (Populist) 2.0%
Missouri 10	Richard Bartholdt	Republican	1892	Incumbent re-elected.	▌ ✓ Richard Bartholdt (Republican) 62.2%; ▌ Thomas P. Coppinger (Democratic) 33.2%; ▌ Charles F. Bechtold (Socialist Labor) 2.6%; ▌ Charles Shattinger (Populist) 1.5%; ▌ Ira R. Hicks (Prohibition) 0.5%
Missouri 11	John J. O'Neill	Democratic	1892	Incumbent retired. Republican gain.	▌ ✓ Charles F. Joy (Republican) 52.5%; ▌ Fred F. Espenschled (Democratic) 44.6%; ▌ Joseph Scheidler (Socialist Labor) 1.5%; ▌ Frank E. Richey (Populist) 1.1%; ▌ Simon S. Riley (Prohibition) 0.3%
Missouri 12	Seth W. Cobb	Democratic	1890	Incumbent re-elected.	▌ ✓ Seth W. Cobb (Democratic) 53.4%; ▌ Frank Sterrett (Republican) 39.5%; ▌ N. O. Nelson (Single-Tax/Populist) 5.7%; ▌ Louis Crusius (Socialist Labor) 1.0%; ▌ E. H. Keller (Prohibition) 0.4%
Missouri 13	Robert W. Fyan	Democratic	1890	Incumbent retired. Republican gain.	▌ ✓ John H. Raney (Republican) 51.3%; ▌ James D. Fox (Democratic) 48.7%
Missouri 14	Marshall Arnold	Democratic	1890	Incumbent lost re-election. Republican gain.	▌ ✓ Norman A. Mozley (Republican) 43.9%; ▌ Marshall Arnold (Democratic) 40.9%; ▌ Ambrose H. Livingston (Populist) 15.2%
Missouri 15	Charles H. Morgan	Democratic	1892	Incumbent lost re-election. Republican gain.	▌ ✓ Charles G. Burton (Republican) 45.2%; ▌ Charles H. Morgan (Democratic) 38.2%; ▌ David J. Bigbee (Populist) 15.6%; ▌ F. M. Hicock (Prohibition) 1.0%

== Montana ==
District	Incumbent			This race	
District	Member	Party	First elected	Results	Candidates
Montana at-large	Charles S. Hartman	Republican	1892	Incumbent re-elected.	▌ ✓ Charles S. Hartman (Republican) 46.97%; ▌Robert B. Smith (Populist) 30.93%; ▌Hal S. Corbett (Democratic) 21.05%; ▌Benjamin F. Maiden (Prohibition) 1.05%

== Nebraska ==
District	Incumbent			This race	
District	Member	Party	First elected	Results	Candidates
Nebraska 1	William Jennings Bryan	Democratic	1890	Incumbent retired to run for U.S. senator. Republican gain.	▌ ✓ Jesse B. Strode (Republican) 56.84%; ▌Austin H. Weir (Democratic/Populist) 39.79%; ▌Richard H. Hawley (Prohibition) 3.37%
Nebraska 2	David H. Mercer	Republican	1892	Incumbent re-elected.	▌ ✓ David H. Mercer (Republican) 50.84%; ▌James E. Boyd (Democratic) 32.06%; ▌D. Clem Deaver (Populist) 15.56%; ▌George W. Woodbey (Prohibition) 1.54%
Nebraska 3	George de Rue Meiklejohn	Republican	1892	Incumbent re-elected.	▌ ✓ George de Rue Meiklejohn (Republican) 44.51%; ▌John M. Devine (Populist) 31.61%; ▌W. A. Hensley (Democratic) 21.59%; ▌J. C. Thomas (Prohibition) 2.29%
Nebraska 4	Eugene J. Hainer	Republican	1892	Incumbent re-elected.	▌ ✓ Eugene J. Hainer (Republican) 50.37%; ▌William L. Stark (Populist) 40.16%; ▌Shannon S. Alley (Democratic) 7.14%; ▌C. M. Woodward (Prohibition) 2.34%
Nebraska 5	William A. McKeighan	Populist	1890	Incumbent lost re-election. Republican gain.	▌ ✓ William E. Andrews (Republican) 49.15%; ▌William A. McKeighan (Populist/Democratic) 46.28%; ▌T. F. Ashby (Straight Democratic) 2.62%; ▌O. C. Hubbell (Prohibition) 1.94%
Nebraska 6	Omer M. Kem	Populist	1890	Incumbent re-elected.	▌ ✓ Omer M. Kem (Populist/Democratic) 52.31%; ▌Matt A. Dougherty (Republican) 44.96%; ▌William Bone (Prohibition) 2.73%

== Nevada ==
District	Incumbent			This race	
District	Member	Party	First elected	Results	Candidates
Nevada at-large	Francis G. Newlands	Silver	1892	Incumbent re-elected.	▌ ✓ Francis G. Newlands (Silver) 44.38%; ▌Horace F. Bartine (Republican) 26.87%; ▌James C. Doughty (Populist) 26.65%; ▌B. F. Riley (Democratic) 2.10%

== New Hampshire ==
District	Incumbent			This race	
District	Member	Party	First elected	Results	Candidates
New Hampshire 1	Henry W. Blair	Republican	1892	Incumbent retired. Republican hold.	▌ ✓ Cyrus A. Sulloway (Republican) 56.3%; ▌ John B. Nash (Democratic) 40.9%; ▌ Edgar L. Carr (Prohibition) 1.8%; ▌ Josiah A. Whittier (Populist) 1.0%
New Hampshire 2	Henry M. Baker	Republican	1892	Incumbent re-elected.	▌ ✓ Henry M. Baker (Republican) 56.3%; ▌ Charles McDaniel (Democratic) 41.2%; ▌ David Heald (Prohibition) 1.8%; ▌ Elias M. Blodgett (Populist) 0.7%

== New Jersey ==
District	Incumbent			This race	
District	Member	Party	First elected	Results	Candidates
New Jersey 1	Henry C. Loudenslager	Republican	1892	Incumbent re-elected.	▌ ✓ Henry C. Loudenslager (Republican) 61.0%; ▌ Thomas M. Ferrell (Democratic) 30.1%; ▌ W. M. Gilbert (Prohibition) 4.3%; ▌ [FNU] Wilcox (Populist) 4.1%; ▌ [FNU] Kreck (Socialist Labor) 0.5%
New Jersey 2	John J. Gardner	Republican	1892	Incumbent re-elected.	▌ ✓ John J. Gardner (Republican) 60.5%; ▌ Martin L. Haines (Democratic) 34.5%; ▌ Jacob D. Joslin (Prohibition) 3.4%; ▌ William B. Ellis (Populist) 1.7%
New Jersey 3	Jacob Augustus Geissenhainer	Democratic	1888	Incumbent lost re-election. Republican gain.	▌ ✓ Benjamin F. Howell (Republican) 53.7%; ▌ Jacob Augustus Geissenhainer (Democratic) 42.1%; ▌ L. M. Lansing (Prohibition) 2.3%; ▌ [FNU] Merritt (Populist) 1.1%; ▌ [FNU] Weigel (Socialist Labor) 0.8%
New Jersey 4	Johnston Cornish	Democratic	1892	Incumbent lost re-election. Republican gain.	▌ ✓ Mahlon Pitney (Republican) 49.0%; ▌ Johnston Cornish (Democratic) 44.7%; ▌ William V. Ramsey (Prohibition) 4.8%; ▌ William C. Barrick (Populist) 1.5%
New Jersey 5	Cornelius A. Cadmus	Democratic	1890	Incumbent retired. Republican gain.	▌ ✓ James F. Stewart (Republican) 54.9%; ▌ Andrew H. Demarest (Democratic) 34.9%; ▌ [FNU] Ball (Socialist Labor) 8.4%; ▌ S. Parsons (Prohibition) 1.8%
New Jersey 6	Thomas Dunn English	Democratic	1890	Incumbent lost re-election. Republican gain.	▌ ✓ Richard W. Parker (Republican) 57.9%; ▌ Thomas Dunn English (Democratic) 36.8%; ▌ [FNU] Walker (Socialist Labor) 2.6%; ▌ [FNU] Buchanan (Populist) 2.0%; ▌ R. Gray (Prohibition) 0.7%
New Jersey 7	George B. Fielder	Democratic	1892	Incumbent retired. Republican gain.	▌ ✓ Thomas McEwan Jr. (Republican) 48.8%; ▌ [FNU] Stevens (Democratic) 48.2%; ▌ [FNU] Herrschaft (Socialist Labor/Populist) 2.4%; ▌ T. W. Burger (Prohibition) 0.6%
New Jersey 8	John T. Dunn	Democratic	1892	Incumbent lost re-election. Republican gain.	▌ ✓ Charles N. Fowler (Republican) 57.4%; ▌ John T. Dunn (Democratic) 38.6%; ▌ [FNU] Bell (Socialist Labor) 1.9%; ▌ T. J. Kennedy (Prohibition) 1.6%; ▌ [FNU] Pope (Populist) 0.5%

== New York ==
District	Incumbent			This race	
District	Member	Party	First elected	Results	Candidates
New York 1	James W. Covert	Democratic	1888	Incumbent retired. Republican gain.	▌ ✓ Richard C. McCormick (Republican) 56.9%; ▌ Joseph Fitch (Democratic) 40.8%; ▌ Harry Hofstadt (Socialist Labor) 1.7%; ▌ George Steinson (Populist) 0.6%
New York 2	John M. Clancy	Democratic	1888	Incumbent retired. Republican gain.	▌ ✓ Denis M. Hurley (Republican) 45.1%; ▌ James O. Cleveland (Democratic) 41.0%; ▌ Daniel Bradley (Reform Democratic) 12.2%; ▌ Freeborn G. Smith (Prohibition) 0.7%; ▌ Michael Raphael (Populist) 0.6%; ▌ Charles L. Furman (Socialist Labor) 0.4%
New York 3	Joseph C. Hendrix	Democratic	1892	Incumbent retired. Republican gain.	▌ ✓ Francis H. Wilson (Republican) 49.8%; ▌ James A. Murtha (Democratic) 38.2%; ▌ Stephen Perry Sturges (Reform Democratic) 10.0%; ▌ Paul Grosser (Socialist Labor) 1.0%; ▌ Andrew L. Martin (Prohibition) 0.6%; ▌ Harrison T. Hickok (Populist) 0.4%
New York 4	William J. Coombs	Democratic	1890	Incumbent lost re-election. Republican gain.	▌ ✓ Israel F. Fischer (Republican) 51.5%; ▌ William J. Coombs (Democratic) 45.6%; ▌ Albert Klein (Socialist Labor) 1.6%; ▌ Enoch L. Vose (Populist) 0.8%; ▌ George R. Scott (Prohibition) 0.5%
New York 5	John H. Graham	Democratic	1892	Incumbent retired. Republican gain.	▌ ✓ Charles G. Bennett (Republican) 58.8%; ▌ Anton Vigelius (Democratic) 36.1%; ▌ Robert J. Larck (Socialist Labor) 3.6%; ▌ William G. Bourke (Populist) 0.9%; ▌ Alphonse Major (Prohibition) 0.6%
New York 6	Thomas F. Magner	Democratic	1888	Incumbent retired. Republican gain.	▌ ✓ James R. Howe (Republican) 51.5%; ▌ Arthur S. Somers (Democratic) 44.7%; ▌ Joseph Hildebrandt (Socialist Labor) 3.2%; ▌ Charles E. Furman (Prohibition) 0.4%; ▌ George Smith (Populist) 0.2%
New York 7	Franklin Bartlett	Democratic	1892	Incumbent re-elected.	▌ ✓ Franklin Bartlett (Democratic) 47.0%; ▌ Austin E. Ford (Republican) 39.5%; ▌ John S. Murphy (Straight Democratic) 11.1%; ▌ Edward J. Wheeler (Prohibition) 1.5%; ▌ Lazarus Abelson (Socialist Labor) 0.9%
New York 8	Edward J. Dunphy	Democratic	1888	Incumbent retired. Democratic hold.	▌ ✓ James J. Walsh (Democratic) 50.3%; ▌ John M. Mitchell (Republican) 48.3%; ▌ John H. Nagel (Socialist Labor) 0.6%; ▌ Albert E. Unger (Populist) 0.4%; ▌ James F. Gillespie (Prohibition) 0.4%
New York 8	Edward J. Dunphy	Democratic	1888	Election successfully contested. New member seated June 2, 1896. Republican gain.	▌ ✓ John M. Mitchell (Republican); ▌ James J. Walsh (Democratic); ▌ John H. Nagel (Socialist Labor); ▌ Albert E. Unger (Populist); ▌ James F. Gillespie (Prohibition)
New York 9	Timothy J. Campbell	Democratic	1890	Incumbent lost re-election as an Independent Democratic candidate. Democratic hold.	▌ ✓ Henry C. Miner (Democratic) 35.1%; ▌ Timothy J. Campbell (Independent Democratic) 31.0%; ▌ John Simpson (Republican) 22.8%; ▌ Daniel De Leon (Socialist Labor) 10.3%; ▌ Abraham Susman (Independent) 0.5%; ▌ Timothy N. Holden (Prohibition) 0.3%
New York 10	Daniel Sickles	Democratic	1892	Incumbent lost re-election but winning candidate died before start of term. Republican gain.	▌ ✓ Andrew J. Campbell (Republican) 46.5%; ▌ Daniel Sickles (Democratic) 43.6%; ▌ George Karsh (Straight Democratic) 7.8%; ▌ Charles G. Teche (Socialist Labor) 1.3%; ▌ William J. Yates (Prohibition) 0.5%; ▌ Charles Sotheran (Populist) 0.3%
New York 11	Amos J. Cummings	Democratic	1889	Incumbent ran for re-election in the 13th district. Democratic hold.	▌ ✓ William Sulzer (Democratic) 47.9%; ▌ Ferdinand Eidman (Republican) 45.0%; ▌ Francis H. Koenig (Socialist Labor) 6.2%; ▌ Edward F. Zimmerman (Populist) 0.6%; ▌ William H. Lorch (Prohibition) 0.3%
New York 12	William Bourke Cockran	Democratic	1891	Incumbent retired. Democratic hold.	▌ ✓ George B. McClellan Jr. (Democratic) 47.4%; ▌ Robert Chesebrough (Republican) 41.6%; ▌ George W. Green (Straight Democratic) 8.9%; ▌ William Klingenberg (Socialist Labor) 1.2%; ▌ George Tombleson (Populist) 0.5%; ▌ John McKee (Prohibition) 0.4%
New York 13	J. De Witt Warner	Democratic	1890	Incumbent retired. Republican gain.	▌ ✓ Richard C. Shannon (Republican) 46.3%; ▌ Amos J. Cummings (Democratic) 44.7%; ▌ Edward C. Baker (Straight Democratic) 6.6%; ▌ William F. Westerfield (Socialist Labor) 1.8%; ▌ Joseph Finn (Populist) 0.3%; ▌ Theophilus J. Manser (Prohibition) 0.3%
New York 14	Lemuel E. Quigg	Republican	1894	Incumbent re-elected.	▌ ✓ Lemuel E. Quigg (Republican) 55.4%; ▌ John Connelly (Democratic) 41.8%; ▌ Isaac Bennett (Socialist Labor) 1.8%; ▌ Edwin V. Wright (Populist) 0.5%; ▌ Samuel Z. Batten (Prohibition) 0.3%; ▌ Theophilus Steele (Straight Democratic) 0.2%
New York 15	Isidor Straus	Democratic	1894	Incumbent retired. Republican gain.	▌ ✓ Philip B. Low (Republican) 48.0%; ▌ Jacob A. Cantor (Democratic) 37.9%; ▌ Robert G. Monroe (Straight Democratic) 10.7%; ▌ Edward Henckler (Socialist Labor) 2.3%; ▌ Dion W. Burke (Populist) 0.7%; ▌ John H. Lemmon (Prohibition) 0.4%
New York 16	William Ryan	Democratic	1892	Incumbent lost re-election. Republican gain.	▌ ✓ Benjamin L. Fairchild (Republican) 54.1%; ▌ William Ryan (Democratic) 42.0%; ▌ John B. Weidekoff (Socialist Labor) 1.7%; ▌ Clarence M. Lyon (Prohibition) 1.4%; ▌ Edward B. Foote (Populist) 0.8%
New York 17	Francis Marvin	Republican	1892	Incumbent retired. Republican hold.	▌ ✓ Benjamin Odell (Republican) 57.5%; ▌ Eugene S. Ives (Democratic) 40.2%; ▌ Theodore Frederick (Prohibition) 2.3%
New York 18	Jacob LeFever	Republican	1892	Incumbent re-elected.	▌ ✓ Jacob LeFever (Republican) 55.8%; ▌ William M. Ketcham (Democratic) 41.9%; ▌ Walter F. Taber (Prohibition) 2.3%
New York 19	Charles Delemere Haines	Democratic	1892	Incumbent lost re-election. Republican gain.	▌ ✓ Frank S. Black (Republican) 53.4%; ▌ Charles Delemere Haines (Democratic) 44.6%; ▌ Adam Y. Myers (Prohibition) 1.5%; ▌ James F. Kelly (Socialist Labor) 0.5%
New York 20	Charles Tracey	Democratic	1887	Incumbent lost re-election. Republican gain.	▌ ✓ George N. Southwick (Republican) 51.1%; ▌ Charles Tracey (Democratic) 46.7%; ▌ Frederick F. Wheeler (Prohibition) 1.0%; ▌ John C. Wieland (Socialist Labor) 0.7%; ▌ Edward J. Lee (Populist) 0.5%
New York 21	Simon J. Schermerhorn	Democratic	1892	Incumbent retired. Republican gain.	▌ ✓ David F. Wilber (Republican) 53.1%; ▌ George Van Horn (Democratic) 44.2%; ▌ George W. Ostrander (Prohibition) 2.7%
New York 22	Newton Martin Curtis	Republican	1891	Incumbent re-elected.	▌ ✓ Newton Martin Curtis (Republican) 61.0%; ▌ Thomas R. Hossie (Democratic) 34.8%; ▌ John L. Weld (Prohibition) 3.3%; ▌ William J. McQueen (Populist) 0.9%
New York 23	John M. Wever	Republican	1890	Incumbent retired. Republican hold.	▌ ✓ Wallace T. Foote Jr. (Republican) 69.0%; ▌ Winslow C. Watson (Democratic) 30.1%; ▌ DeMyre S. Fero (Populist) 0.9%
New York 24	Charles A. Chickering	Republican	1892	Incumbent re-elected.	▌ ✓ Charles A. Chickering (Republican) 61.3%; ▌ Washington T. Henderson (Democratic) 35.4%; ▌ Edward A. Sheldon (Prohibition) 3.3%
New York 25	James S. Sherman	Republican	1892	Incumbent re-elected.	▌ ✓ James S. Sherman (Republican) 56.2%; ▌ John D. Henderson (Democratic) 40.5%; ▌ Elliot W. Johnson (Prohibition) 2.5%; ▌ John J. Rees (Populist) 0.8%
New York 26	George W. Ray	Republican	1890	Incumbent re-elected.	▌ ✓ George W. Ray (Republican) 63.8%; ▌ Sherrill E. Smith (Democratic) 34.8%; ▌ William K. Cessna (Prohibition) 1.4%
New York 27	James J. Belden	Republican	1887	Incumbent retired. Republican hold.	▌ ✓ Theodore L. Poole (Republican) 57.3%; ▌ Walter E. Northrup (Democratic) 37.9%; ▌ Charles H. Perkins (Prohibition) 2.8%; ▌ Erasmus Pellens (Socialist Labor) 1.5%; ▌ John S. Freeman (Populist) 0.5%
New York 28	Sereno E. Payne	Republican	1889	Incumbent re-elected.	▌ ✓ Sereno E. Payne (Republican) 61.4%; ▌ Eli McConnell (Democratic) 33.1%; ▌ Harmon S. Potter (Prohibition) 3.5%; ▌ Herbert L. Case (Populist) 2.0%
New York 29	Charles W. Gillet	Republican	1892	Incumbent re-elected.	▌ ✓ Charles W. Gillet (Republican) 54.1%; ▌ George H. Roberts (Democratic) 40.5%; ▌ Albert J. Cort (Prohibition) 4.3%; ▌ Emerson Orvis (Populist) 1.1%
New York 30	James W. Wadsworth	Republican	1890	Incumbent re-elected.	▌ ✓ James W. Wadsworth (Republican) 59.8%; ▌ Francis Murphy (Democratic) 34.0%; ▌ Frank H. Martin (Prohibition) 4.0%; ▌ James W. Lawton (Populist) 2.2%
New York 31	John Van Voorhis	Republican	1892	Incumbent retired. Republican hold.	▌ ✓ Henry C. Brewster (Republican) 55.6%; ▌ John D. Lynn (Democratic) 40.2%; ▌ John M. Campbell (Populist) 1.6%; ▌ Lyman C. Hough (Prohibition) 1.5%; ▌ Carl A. Ludecke (Socialist Labor) 1.1%
New York 32	Daniel N. Lockwood	Democratic	1890	Incumbent retired. Republican gain.	▌ ✓ Rowland B. Mahany (Republican) 51.3%; ▌ Joseph E. Gavin (Democratic) 45.8%; ▌ John W. Williams (Populist) 1.3%; ▌ Joseph Otto (Socialist Labor) 1.0%; ▌ William H. Goodenough (Prohibition) 0.6%
New York 33	Charles Daniels	Republican	1892	Incumbent re-elected.	▌ ✓ Charles Daniels (Republican) 65.5%; ▌ Jacob Morgenster (Democratic) 30.8%; ▌ George W. Taylor (Prohibition) 1.5%; ▌ Isaac W. Gale (Populist) 1.4%; ▌ Henry Waldermann (Socialist Labor) 0.8%
New York 34	Warren B. Hooker	Republican	1890	Incumbent re-elected.	▌ ✓ Warren B. Hooker (Republican) 64.2%; ▌ Staley N. Wood (Democratic) 26.4%; ▌ Andrew Y. Freeman (Prohibition) 5.4%; ▌ David Frank Allen (Populist) 4.0%

== North Carolina ==
District	Incumbent			This race	
District	Member	Party	First elected	Results	Candidates
North Carolina 1	William A. B. Branch	Democratic	1890	Incumbent lost re-election. Populist gain.	▌ ✓ Harry Skinner (Populist/Republican) 54.9%; ▌ William A. B. Branch (Democratic) 45.1%
North Carolina 2	Frederick A. Woodard	Democratic	1892	Incumbent re-elected.	▌ ✓ Frederick A. Woodard (Democratic) 50.0%; ▌ Henry P. Cheatham (Republican) 31.9%; ▌ Howard F. Freeman (Populist) 18.0%
North Carolina 3	Benjamin F. Grady	Democratic	1890	Incumbent retired. Democratic hold.	▌ ✓ John G. Shaw (Democratic) 39.1%; ▌ Cyrus Thompson (Populist) 35.5%; ▌ Oscar J. Spear (Republican) 25.5%
North Carolina 4	Benjamin H. Bunn	Democratic	1888	Incumbent retired. Populist gain.	▌ ✓ William F. Strowd (Populist/Republican) 56.5%; ▌ Charles M. Cooke (Democratic) 43.4%
North Carolina 5	Thomas Settle	Republican	1892	Incumbent re-elected.	▌ ✓ Thomas Settle (Republican) 50.8%; ▌ Augustus W. Graham (Democratic) 42.2%; ▌ William Merritt (Populist) 6.3%; ▌ Jeremiah W. Holt (Prohibition) 0.6%
North Carolina 6	Sydenham B. Alexander	Democratic	1890	Incumbent retired. Democratic hold.	▌ ✓ James A. Lockhart (Democratic) 50.8%; ▌ Charles H. Martin (Populist/Republican) 49.0%
North Carolina 6	Sydenham B. Alexander	Democratic	1890	Election successfully contested. New member seated June 5, 1896. Populist gain.	▌ ✓ Charles H. Martin (Populist/Republican); ▌ James A. Lockhart (Democratic)
North Carolina 7	John S. Henderson	Democratic	1884	Incumbent lost re-election. Populist gain.	▌ ✓ Alonzo C. Shuford (Populist/Republican) 53.9%; ▌ John S. Henderson (Democratic) 46.0%
North Carolina 8	William H. Bower	Democratic	1892	Incumbent lost re-election. Republican gain.	▌ ✓ Romulus Z. Linney (Republican/Populist) 54.6%; ▌ William H. Bower (Democratic) 45.1%; ▌ William M. White (Prohibition) 0.3%
North Carolina 9	William T. Crawford	Democratic	1890	Incumbent lost re-election. Republican gain.	▌ ✓ Richmond Pearson (Republican/Populist) 50.2%; ▌ William T. Crawford (Democratic) 49.8%

== North Dakota ==
District	Incumbent			This race	
District	Member	Party	First elected	Results	Candidates
North Dakota at-large	Martin N. Johnson	Republican	1890	Incumbent re-elected.	▌ ✓ Martin N. Johnson (Republican) 55.43%; ▌Walter Muir (Farmers' Alliance) 40.16%; ▌Bud Reeve (Ind. Democratic) 3.29%; ▌Lathrop S. Ellis (Prohibition) 1.13%

== Ohio ==
District	Incumbent			This race	
District	Member	Party	First elected	Results	Candidates
Ohio 1	Bellamy Storer	Republican	1890	Incumbent retired. Republican hold.	▌ ✓ Charles Phelps Taft (Republican) 61.0%; ▌Hiram D. Peck (Democratic) 32.8%; ▌Thomas John Donnelly (Populist) 5.3%; ▌Samuel Wells (Prohibition) 0.9%
Ohio 2	Jacob H. Bromwell	Republican	1894 (s)	Incumbent re-elected.	▌ ✓ Jacob H. Bromwell (Republican) 62.5%; ▌James B. Matson (Democratic) 30.0%; ▌Robert H. H. Wheeler (Populist) 6.9%; ▌George M. Hammell (Prohibition) 0.7%
Ohio 3	Paul J. Sorg	Democratic	1894 (s)	Incumbent re-elected.	▌ ✓ Paul J. Sorg (Democratic) 48.0%; ▌Andrew L. Harris (Republican) 47.6%; ▌William J. Kronange (Populist) 2.9%; ▌Gideon P. Macklin (Prohibition) 1.5%
Ohio 4	Fernando C. Layton	Democratic	1892	Incumbent re-elected.	▌ ✓ Fernando C. Layton (Democratic) 47.2%; ▌William D. Davies (Republican) 42.6%; ▌Joseph White (Populist) 7.1%; ▌George C. Enders (Prohibition) 3.1%
Ohio 5	Dennis D. Donovan	Democratic	1892	Incumbent lost renomination. Republican gain.	▌ ✓ Francis B. De Witt (Republican) 49.4%; ▌John S. Snook (Democratic) 44.5%; ▌Henry L. Goll (Populist) 6.0%
Ohio 6	George W. Hulick	Republican	1892	Incumbent re-elected.	▌ ✓ George W. Hulick (Republican) 57.3%; ▌Joseph L. Stephens (Democratic) 35.3%; ▌Seth H. Ellis (Prohibition) 4.0%; ▌C. N. Pulse (Populist) 3.4%
Ohio 7	George W. Wilson	Republican	1892	Incumbent re-elected.	▌ ✓ George W. Wilson (Republican) 54.9%; ▌Charles E. Gain (Democratic) 35.8%; ▌Henry Fecker (Populist) 4.9%; ▌Ralph S. Thompson (Prohibition) 4.5%
Ohio 8	Luther M. Strong	Republican	1892	Incumbent re-elected.	▌ ✓ Luther M. Strong (Republican) 58.5%; ▌Elijah T. Dunn (Democratic) 31.6%; ▌George Riddle (Populist) 5.5%; ▌Thomas D. Crow (Prohibition) 4.4%
Ohio 9	Byron F. Ritchie	Democratic	1892	Incumbent lost re-election. Republican gain.	▌ ✓ James H. Southard (Republican) 54.8%; ▌Byron F. Ritchie (Democratic) 37.3%; ▌George Candee (Populist/Prohibition) 7.8%
Ohio 10	Hezekiah S. Bundy	Republican	1893 (s)	Incumbent retired. Republican hold.	▌ ✓ Lucien J. Fenton (Republican) 62.5%; ▌John O. Yates (Democratic) 30.0%; ▌John H. Cobb (Populist) 4.7%; ▌Alex R. McIntosh (Prohibition) 2.8%
Ohio 11	Charles H. Grosvenor	Republican	1892	Incumbent re-elected.	▌ ✓ Charles H. Grosvenor (Republican) 56.9%; ▌Eli R. Lash (Democratic) 31.8%; ▌William H. Crawford (Populist) 8.6%; ▌William A. Roust (Prohibition) 2.7%
Ohio 12	Joseph H. Outhwaite	Democratic	1892	Incumbent lost re-election. Republican gain.	▌ ✓ David K. Watson (Republican) 49.4%; ▌Joseph H. Outhwaite (Democratic) 45.3%; ▌George F. Ebner (Populist) 5.3%
Ohio 13	Darius D. Hare	Democratic	1892	Incumbent retired. Republican gain.	▌ ✓ Stephen Ross Harris (Republican) 46.0%; ▌Boston G. Young (Democratic) 44.4%; ▌Amos Kellar (Populist) 7.2%; ▌George W. Dunn (Prohibition) 2.5%
Ohio 14	Michael D. Harter	Democratic	1892	Incumbent retired. Republican gain.	▌ ✓ Winfield S. Kerr (Republican) 54.6%; ▌James C. Laser (Democratic) 36.6%; ▌William T. Geltz (Populist) 4.9%; ▌William H. Funk (Prohibition) 3.9%
Ohio 15	H. Clay Van Voorhis	Republican	1892	Incumbent re-elected.	▌ ✓ H. Clay Van Voorhis (Republican) 56.7%; ▌Charles Richardson (Democratic) 35.3%; ▌Stephen R. Crumbaker (Populist) 4.4%; ▌James Benjamin (Prohibition) 3.6%
Ohio 16	Albert J. Pearson	Democratic	1892	Incumbent retired. Republican gain.	▌ ✓ Lorenzo Danford (Republican) 55.9%; ▌Albert O. Barnes (Democratic) 33.0%; ▌James Brettelle (Populist) 6.3%; ▌J. F. Ball (Prohibition) 4.8%
Ohio 17	James A. D. Richards	Democratic	1892	Incumbent lost re-election. Republican gain.	▌ ✓ Addison S. McClure (Republican) 48.8%; ▌James A. D. Richards (Democratic) 44.5%; ▌William F. Loyd (Populist) 5.8%; ▌Joseph M. Scott (Prohibition) 0.9%
Ohio 18	George P. Ikirt	Democratic	1892	Incumbent retired. Republican gain.	▌ ✓ Robert W. Tayler (Republican) 49.0%; ▌Edward S. Raff (Democratic) 26.0%; ▌Jacob S. Coxey Sr. (Populist) 21.0%; ▌Enos H. Brosius (Prohibition) 4.0%
Ohio 19	Stephen A. Northway	Republican	1892	Incumbent re-elected.	▌ ✓ Stephen A. Northway (Republican) 62.9%; ▌Henry Apthorp (Democratic) 20.2%; ▌George A. Wise (Populist) 12.6%; ▌Colon H. Stambaugh (Prohibition) 4.3%
Ohio 20	William J. White	Republican	1892	Incumbent retired. Republican hold.	▌ ✓ Clifton B. Beach (Republican) 59.1%; ▌H. B. Harrington (Democratic) 28.5%; ▌Luther S. Copper (Populist) 8.4%; ▌William H. Watkins (Prohibition) 3.2%; ▌Paul Dingen (Socialist Labor) 0.9%
Ohio 21	Tom L. Johnson	Democratic	1890	Incumbent lost re-election. Republican gain.	▌ ✓ Theodore E. Burton (Republican) 53.4%; ▌Tom L. Johnson (Democratic) 39.4%; ▌George A. Groot (Populist) 5.4%; ▌John McDonough (Prohibition) 1.5%; ▌John Hetzner (Socialist Labor) 0.4%

== Oregon ==
District	Incumbent			This race	
District	Member	Party	First elected	Results	Candidates
Oregon 1	Binger Hermann	Republican	1884	Incumbent re-elected.	▌ ✓ Binger Hermann (Republican) 47.62%; ▌Charles Miller (Populist) 26.99%; ▌J. K. Weatherford (Democratic) 23.08%; ▌John D. Hurst (Prohibition) 2.31%
Oregon 2	William R. Ellis	Republican	1892	Incumbent re-elected.	▌ ✓ William R. Ellis (Republican) 47.89%; ▌Joseph Waldrop (Populist) 27.27%; ▌James H. Raley (Democratic) 22.87%; ▌A. F. Miller (Prohibition) 1.97%

== Pennsylvania ==
District	Incumbent			This race	
District	Member	Party	First elected	Results	Candidates
Pennsylvania 1	Henry H. Bingham	Republican	1878	Incumbent re-elected.	▌ ✓ Henry H. Bingham (Republican) 70.7%; ▌ Denis J. Callaghan (Democratic) 28.8%; ▌ Samuel M. Pugh (Prohibition) 0.5%
Pennsylvania 2	Robert Adams Jr.	Republican	1893	Incumbent re-elected.	▌ ✓ Robert Adams Jr. (Republican) 75.7%; ▌ Max Herzberg (Democratic) 23.7%; ▌ T. Howard Wright (Prohibition) 0.6%
Pennsylvania 3	William McAleer	Independent Democratic	1890	Incumbent lost renomination as a Democratic candidate. Republican gain.	▌ ✓ Frederick Halterman (Republican) 65.8%; ▌ Joseph P. McCullen (Democratic) 34.2%
Pennsylvania 4	John E. Reyburn	Republican	1890	Incumbent re-elected.	▌ ✓ John E. Reyburn (Republican) 71.8%; ▌ Gustav A. Muller (Democratic) 27.2%; ▌ Samuel Daggy (Prohibition) 1.0%
Pennsylvania 5	Alfred C. Harmer	Republican	1876	Incumbent re-elected.	▌ ✓ Alfred C. Harmer (Republican) 74.8%; ▌ David Moffet (Democratic) 24.1%; ▌ Thomas B. Luzier (Prohibition) 0.6%; ▌ Frank Wright (Populist) 0.5%
Pennsylvania 6	John B. Robinson	Republican	1890	Incumbent re-elected.	▌ ✓ John B. Robinson (Republican) 64.7%; ▌ Thomas E. Parke (Democratic) 30.6%; ▌ William H. Berry (Prohibition) 4.7%
Pennsylvania 7	Irving P. Wanger	Republican	1892	Incumbent re-elected.	▌ ✓ Irving P. Wanger (Republican) 54.8%; ▌ John Todd (Democratic) 43.3%; ▌ Augustus P. Fritz (Prohibition) 1.5%; ▌ Jacob Twining (Populist) 0.4%
Pennsylvania 8	Howard Mutchler	Democratic	1893	Incumbent retired. Democratic hold.	▌ ✓ Joseph J. Hart (Democratic) 49.2%; ▌ William Sebring Kirkpatrick (Republican) 48.5%; ▌ Edward A. Packer (Prohibition) 1.6%; ▌ Thompson Ackerman (Populist) 0.7%
Pennsylvania 9	Constantine J. Erdman	Democratic	1892	Incumbent re-elected.	▌ ✓ Constantine J. Erdman (Democratic) 51.7%; ▌ Jeremiah S. Trexler (Republican) 47.0%; ▌ Samuel J. Hill (Populist) 1.3%
Pennsylvania 10	Marriott Brosius	Republican	1888	Incumbent re-elected.	▌ ✓ Marriott Brosius (Republican) 70.9%; ▌ John A. Coyle (Democratic) 26.4%; ▌ Brinton Walter (Prohibition) 2.7%
Pennsylvania 11	Joseph A. Scranton	Republican	1892	Incumbent re-elected.	▌ ✓ Joseph A. Scranton (Republican) 51.1%; ▌ Edward Merrifield (Democratic) 43.5%; ▌ William H. Richmond (Prohibition) 3.7%; ▌ L. A. Smith (Populist) 1.8%
Pennsylvania 12	William Henry Hines	Democratic	1892	Incumbent lost re-election. Republican gain.	▌ ✓ John Leisenring (Republican) 56.1%; ▌ William Henry Hines (Democratic) 39.2%; ▌ Henry W. Evans (Prohibition) 4.7%
Pennsylvania 13	James B. Reilly	Democratic	1888	Incumbent lost re-election. Republican gain.	▌ ✓ Charles N. Brumm (Republican) 54.3%; ▌ James B. Reilly (Democratic) 45.7%
Pennsylvania 14	Ephraim M. Woomer	Republican	1892	Incumbent re-elected.	▌ ✓ Ephraim M. Woomer (Republican) 64.1%; ▌ William H. Minick (Democratic) 30.7%; ▌ Adam R. Forney (Prohibition) 3.9%; ▌ Adam Behney (Populist) 1.2%
Pennsylvania 15	Myron B. Wright	Republican	1888	Incumbent re-elected but died before start of term.	▌ ✓ Myron B. Wright (Republican) 64.3%; ▌ Rhamanthus M. Stocker (Democratic) 30.8%; ▌ Arthur W. Livisee (Prohibition) 4.4%; ▌ Edwin A. Weston (Populist) 0.5%
Pennsylvania 16	Albert C. Hopkins	Republican	1890	Incumbent retired. Republican hold.	▌ ✓ Fred C. Leonard (Republican) 53.8%; ▌ James B. Benson (Democratic) 37.5%; ▌ Andrew Sherwood (Prohibition) 5.4%; ▌ Justus Watkins (Populist) 3.4%
Pennsylvania 17	Simon P. Wolverton	Democratic	1890	Incumbent retired. Republican gain.	▌ ✓ Monroe H. Kulp (Republican) 49.3%; ▌ Charles R. Buckalew (Democratic) 45.8%; ▌ Thomas C. Curry (Prohibition) 4.0%; ▌ Zachery T. Arms (Populist) 0.9%
Pennsylvania 18	Thaddeus M. Mahon	Republican	1892	Incumbent re-elected.	▌ ✓ Thaddeus M. Mahon (Republican) 61.1%; ▌ D. G. Smith (Democratic) 38.9%
Pennsylvania 19	Frank E. Beltzhoover	Democratic	1890	Incumbent retired. Republican gain.	▌ ✓ James A. Stahle (Republican) 52.1%; ▌ Peter H. Strubinger (Democratic) 46.2%; ▌ William A. McIlheny (Prohibition) 1.7%
Pennsylvania 20	Josiah D. Hicks	Republican	1892	Incumbent re-elected.	▌ ✓ Josiah D. Hicks (Republican) 62.9%; ▌ Thomas J. Burke (Democratic) 33.1%; ▌ George H. Hocking (Prohibition) 2.2%; ▌ John Suckling (Populist) 1.8%
Pennsylvania 21	Daniel B. Heiner	Republican	1892	Incumbent re-elected.	▌ ✓ Daniel B. Heiner (Republican) 61.1%; ▌ William M. Fairman (Democratic) 32.3%; ▌ John Fry (Populist) 4.4%; ▌ Bennet H. Vankirk (Prohibition) 2.2%
Pennsylvania 22	John Dalzell	Republican	1886	Incumbent re-elected.	▌ ✓ John Dalzell (Republican) 76.6%; ▌ James A. Wakefield (Democratic) 19.5%; ▌ Samuel D. Karns (Populist) 3.9%
Pennsylvania 23	William A. Stone	Republican	1890	Incumbent re-elected.	▌ ✓ William A. Stone (Republican) 77.6%; ▌ James Semple (Democratic) 19.3%; ▌ J. H. Stevenson (Populist) 3.1%
Pennsylvania 24	William A. Sipe	Democratic	1892	Incumbent lost re-election. Republican gain.	▌ ✓ Ernest F. Acheson (Republican) 57.2%; ▌ William A. Sipe (Democratic) 35.9%; ▌ D. W. Hutchinson (Populist) 4.8%; ▌ Albert Gaddis (Prohibition) 2.1%
Pennsylvania 25	Thomas Wharton Phillips	Republican	1892	Incumbent re-elected.	▌ ✓ Thomas Wharton Phillips (Republican) 61.6%; ▌ Joseph C. Vanderlin (Democratic) 29.0%; ▌ William J. Kirker (Populist) 5.3%; ▌ Joseph S. White (Prohibition) 4.1%
Pennsylvania 26	Joseph C. Sibley	Democratic	1892	Incumbent lost re-election. Republican gain.	▌ ✓ Matthew Griswold (Republican) 52.9%; ▌ Joseph C. Sibley (Democratic/Populist) 44.6%; ▌ W. T. Everson (Prohibition) 2.5%
Pennsylvania 27	Charles W. Stone	Republican	1890	Incumbent re-elected.	▌ ✓ Charles W. Stone (Republican) 61.1%; ▌ John F. Parsons (Democratic) 25.2%; ▌ S. P. McCalmont (Prohibition) 9.0%; ▌ James D. Blair (Populist) 4.7%
Pennsylvania 28	George F. Kribbs	Democratic	1890	Incumbent lost renomination. Republican gain.	▌ ✓ William C. Arnold (Republican) 50.6%; ▌ Aaron Williams (Democratic) 45.2%; ▌ W. H. Watt (Prohibition) 4.2%
Pennsylvania at-large 2 seats on a general ticket.	Galusha A. Grow	Republican	1894	Incumbent re-elected.	▌ ✓ Galusha A. Grow (Republican) 30.5%; ▌ ✓ George F. Huff (Republican) 30.2%; ▌ Henry Meyer (Democratic) 17.5%; ▌ Thomas Collins (Democratic) 17.3%; ▌ Elisha Kent Kane (Prohibition) 1.3%; ▌ Lewis G. Jordan (Prohibition) 1.2%; ▌ Victor A. Lotier (Populist) 1.0%; ▌ B. F. Greenman (Populist) 0.9%; ▌ Ernest Kreft (Socialist Labor) 0.1%; ▌ Gottfried Metzler (Socialist Labor) 0.1%
Pennsylvania at-large 2 seats on a general ticket.	Alexander McDowell	Republican	1892	Incumbent retired. Republican hold.	▌ ✓ Galusha A. Grow (Republican) 30.5%; ▌ ✓ George F. Huff (Republican) 30.2%; ▌ Henry Meyer (Democratic) 17.5%; ▌ Thomas Collins (Democratic) 17.3%; ▌ Elisha Kent Kane (Prohibition) 1.3%; ▌ Lewis G. Jordan (Prohibition) 1.2%; ▌ Victor A. Lotier (Populist) 1.0%; ▌ B. F. Greenman (Populist) 0.9%; ▌ Ernest Kreft (Socialist Labor) 0.1%; ▌ Gottfried Metzler (Socialist Labor) 0.1%

== Rhode Island ==
District	Incumbent			This race	
District	Member	Party	First elected	Results	Candidates
Rhode Island 1	Oscar Lapham	Democratic	1890	Incumbent lost re-election. Republican gain.	▌ ✓ Melville Bull (Republican) 57.2%; ▌ Oscar Lapham (Democratic) 36.6%; ▌ James Jefferson (Socialist Labor) 3.0%; ▌ James A. Williams (Prohibition) 2.2%; ▌ Bartholomew Vallette (Populist) 0.9%
Rhode Island 2	Charles H. Page	Democratic	1890	Incumbent retired. Republican gain.	▌ ✓ Adin B. Capron (Republican) 59.8%; ▌ Lucius F. C. Garvin (Democratic) 34.8%; ▌ John B. Jordan (Prohibition) 3.8%; ▌ Patrick Mulligan (Socialist Labor) 1.1%; ▌ Augustus Mathews (Populist) 0.4%

== South Carolina ==
District	Incumbent			This race	
District	Member	Party	First elected	Results	Candidates
South Carolina 1	James F. Izlar	Democratic	1894 (special)	Incumbent retired. Democratic loss.	▌ ✓ William Elliott (Democratic) 59.1%; ▌George W. Murray (Republican) 40.9%
South Carolina 1	George W. Murray; Redistricted from the 7th district	Republican	1892	Incumbent lost re-election. Democratic gain. Murray successfully challenged Elliott's election and was awarded the seat on June 4, 1896.	▌ ✓ William Elliott (Democratic) 59.1%; ▌George W. Murray (Republican) 40.9%
South Carolina 2	W. Jasper Talbert	Democratic	1892	Incumbent re-elected.	▌ ✓ W. Jasper Talbert (Democratic) 99.5%; Others 0.5%
South Carolina 3	Asbury Latimer	Democratic	1892	Incumbent re-elected.	▌ ✓ Asbury Latimer (Democratic) 81.3%; ▌Robert Moorman (Republican) 13.9%; Others 4.8%
South Carolina 4	George W. Shell	Democratic	1890	Incumbent retired. Democratic hold.	▌ ✓ Stanyarne Wilson (Democratic) 75.1%; ▌Lawson D. Melton (Republican) 24.7%; Others 0.2%
South Carolina 5	Thomas J. Strait	Democratic	1892	Incumbent re-elected.	▌ ✓ Thomas J. Strait (Democratic) 67.6%; ▌G. G. Alexander (Republican) 17.0%; ▌W. R. Davie (Independent) 12.8%; Others 2.6%
South Carolina 6	John L. McLaurin	Democratic	1892	Incumbent re-elected.	▌ ✓ John L. McLaurin (Democratic) 76.9%; ▌J. P. Wilson (Republican) 23.1%
South Carolina 7	None (New district)			New district. Democratic gain. The election was voided on June 1, 1896, due to electoral fraud.	▌ ✓ J. William Stokes (Democratic) 73.0%; ▌T. B. Johnson (Republican) 26.3%; Others 0.7%

== South Dakota ==
District	Incumbent			This race	
District	Member	Party	First elected	Results	Candidates
South Dakota at-large 2 seats	John Pickler	Republican	1889	Incumbent re-elected.	▌ ✓ Robert J. Gamble (Republican) 26.44%; ▌ ✓ John Pickler (Republican) 26.40%; ▌John E. Kelley (Independent) 17.79%; ▌Freeman Knowles (Independent) 17.77%; ▌William A. Lynch (Democratic) 5.27%; ▌Roger F. Connor (Democratic) 5.23%; ▌Roger F. Connor (Prohibition) 0.57%
South Dakota at-large 2 seats	William V. Lucas	Republican	1892	Incumbent lost renomination. Republican hold.	▌ ✓ Robert J. Gamble (Republican) 26.44%; ▌ ✓ John Pickler (Republican) 26.40%; ▌John E. Kelley (Independent) 17.79%; ▌Freeman Knowles (Independent) 17.77%; ▌William A. Lynch (Democratic) 5.27%; ▌Roger F. Connor (Democratic) 5.23%; ▌Roger F. Connor (Prohibition) 0.57%

== Tennessee ==
District	Incumbent			This race	
District	Member	Party	First elected	Results	Candidates
Tennessee 1	Alfred A. Taylor	Republican	1888	Incumbent retired. Republican hold.	▌ ✓ William C. Anderson (Republican) 61.66%; ▌Thad A. Cox (Democratic) 29.23%; ▌R. S. Cheves (Prohibition) 9.11%
Tennessee 2	John C. Houk	Republican	1891 (special)	Incumbent lost re-election as an Independent Republican. Republican hold.	▌ ✓ Henry R. Gibson (Republican) 53.24%; ▌John C. Houk (Ind. Republican) 43.31%; ▌Jonathan M. Meek (Populist) 2.10%; ▌W. G. Olinger (Prohibition) 1.36%
Tennessee 3	Henry C. Snodgrass	Democratic	1890	Incumbent lost re-election. Republican gain.	▌ ✓ Foster V. Brown (Republican) 52.15%; ▌Henry C. Snodgrass (Democratic) 42.74%; ▌Frank P. Dickey (Prohibition) 5.11%
Tennessee 4	Benton McMillin	Democratic	1878	Incumbent re-elected.	▌ ✓ Benton McMillin (Democratic) 54.18%; ▌J. A. Denton (Republican) 45.83%
Tennessee 5	James D. Richardson	Democratic	1884	Incumbent re-elected.	▌ ✓ James D. Richardson (Democratic) 53.70%; ▌W. W. Erwin (Populist) 44.80%; ▌R. S. Montgomery (Republican) 1.50%
Tennessee 6	Joseph E. Washington	Democratic	1886	Incumbent re-elected.	▌ ✓ Joseph E. Washington (Democratic) 53.97%; ▌Tip Gamble (Republican) 23.05%; ▌T. W. Lewis (Populist) 22.98%
Tennessee 7	Nicholas N. Cox	Democratic	1890	Incumbent re-elected.	▌ ✓ Nicholas N. Cox (Democratic) 52.57%; ▌H. F. Farris (Republican) 36.78%; ▌J. K. Blackburn (Populist) 10.65%
Tennessee 8	Benjamin A. Enloe	Democratic	1886	Incumbent lost re-election. Republican gain.	▌ ✓ John E. McCall (Republican) 51.62%; ▌Benjamin A. Enloe (Democratic) 48.38%
Tennessee 9	James C. McDearmon	Democratic	1892	Incumbent re-elected.	▌ ✓ James C. McDearmon (Democratic) 57.12%; ▌Atwood Pierson (Populist) 42.88%
Tennessee 10	Josiah Patterson	Democratic	1890	Incumbent re-elected.	▌ ✓ Josiah Patterson (Democratic) 66.12%; ▌J. W. Brown (Republican) 19.43%; ▌R. J. Rawlings (Populist) 14.45%

== Texas ==
District	Incumbent			This race	
District	Member	Party	First elected	Results	Candidates
Texas 1	Joseph C. Hutcheson	Democratic	1892	Incumbent re-elected.	▌ ✓ Joseph C. Hutcheson (Democratic) 55.01%; ▌J. J. Burroughs (Populist) 37.01%; ▌L. E. Dunns (Republican) 7.98%
Texas 2	Samuel B. Cooper	Democratic	1892	Incumbent re-elected.	▌ ✓ Samuel B. Cooper (Democratic) 59.27%; ▌B. A. Calhoun (Populist) 40.73%
Texas 3	Constantine B. Kilgore	Democratic	1890	Incumbent retired. Democratic hold.	▌ ✓ C. H. Yoakum (Democratic) 55.47%; ▌J. M. Perdue (Populist) 44.53%
Texas 4	Benton McMillin	Democratic	1874	Incumbent re-elected.	▌ ✓ David B. Culberson (Democratic) 49.29%; ▌James H. Davis (Populist) 45.35%; ▌H. S. Sanderson (Republican) 5.37%
Texas 5	Joseph W. Bailey	Democratic	1890	Incumbent re-elected.	▌ ✓ Joseph W. Bailey (Democratic) 56.71%; ▌N. W. Browder (Populist) 38.93%; ▌W. S. Farmer (Republican) 4.36%
Texas 6	Jo Abbott	Democratic	1886	Incumbent re-elected.	▌ ✓ Jo Abbott (Democratic) 49.23%; ▌Jerome Kearby (Populist) 48.38%; ▌B. O. James (Republican) 2.39%
Texas 7	George C. Pendleton	Democratic	1892	Incumbent re-elected.	▌ ✓ George C. Pendleton (Democratic) 52.41%; ▌I. N. Barber (Populist) 47.59%
Texas 8	Charles K. Bell	Democratic	1892	Incumbent re-elected.	▌ ✓ Charles K. Bell (Democratic) 50.58%; ▌C. H. Jenkins (Populist) 49.42%
Texas 9	Joseph D. Sayers	Democratic	1884	Incumbent re-elected.	▌ ✓ Joseph D. Sayers (Democratic) 52.67%; ▌W. O. Hutchison (Populist) 47.33%
Texas 10	Walter Gresham	Democratic	1892	Incumbent retired. Democratic hold.	▌ ✓ Miles Crowley (Democratic) 39.41%; ▌A. J. Rosenthal (Republican) 35.19%; ▌J. C. McBride (Populist) 25.40%
Texas 11	William H. Crain	Democratic	1884	Incumbent re-elected.	▌ ✓ William H. Crain (Democratic) 52.73%; ▌V. Weldon (Republican) 47.27%
Texas 12	Thomas M. Paschal	Democratic	1892	Incumbent retired. Republican gain.	▌ ✓ George H. Noonan (Republican) 43.41%; ▌A. W. Houston (Democratic) 40.09%; ▌A. V. Gates (Populist) 16.50%
Texas 13	Jeremiah V. Cockrell	Democratic	1892	Incumbent re-elected.	▌ ✓ Jeremiah V. Cockrell (Democratic) 39.82%; ▌D. B. Gilliland (Populist) 38.75%; ▌J. M. Dean (Ind. Democratic) 16.81%; ▌R. J. Rawlings (Republican) 4.62%

== Vermont ==
District	Incumbent			This race	
District	Member	Party	First elected	Results	Candidates
Vermont 1	H. Henry Powers	Republican	1890	Incumbent re-elected.	▌ ✓ H. Henry Powers (Republican) 75.4%; ▌Vernon A. Bullard (Democratic) 24.5%
Vermont 2	William W. Grout	Republican	1880; 1882 (lost); 1884	Incumbent re-elected.	▌ ✓ William W. Grout (Republican) 75.2%; ▌George S. Fletcher (Democratic) 24.6%

== Virginia ==
District	Incumbent			This race	
District	Member	Party	First elected	Results	Candidates
Virginia 1	William A. Jones	Democratic	1890	Incumbent re-elected.	▌ ✓ William A. Jones (Democratic) 60.1%; ▌J. J. McDonald (Republican) 36.0%; ▌C. B. Morton (Populist) 2.4%; ▌Francis A. Bristow (Prohibition) 1.5%
Virginia 2	David G. Tyler	Democratic	1892	Incumbent re-elected.	▌ ✓ David G. Tyler (Democratic) 56.3%; ▌Thomas R. Borland (Republican) 40.3%; ▌T. J. Edwards (Populist) 3.4%
Virginia 3	George D. Wise	Democratic	1880	Incumbent retired. Democratic hold.	▌ ✓ Tazewell Ellett (Democratic) 63.3%; ▌J. W. Southward (Republican) 25.1%; ▌James M. Gregory (Populist) 9.6%; Others: ▌G. M. Smithdeal (Prohibition) 1.2%; ▌Martin M. Lipscomb (Independent) 0.7%
Virginia 4	James F. Epes	Democratic	1890	Incumbent retired. Democratic hold.	▌ ✓ William R. McKenney (Democratic) 48.1%; ▌Robert Taylor Thorp (Republican) 43.3%; ▌J. Haskins Hobson (Populist) 6.1%; Others: ▌B. R. Horner (Prohibition) 1.6%; ▌Lee Thorton (Independent) 1.0%
Virginia 4	James F. Epes	Democratic	1890	Election successfully challenged. Republican gain.	▌ ✓ Robert Taylor Thorp (Republican)
Virginia 5	Claude A. Swanson	Democratic	1892	Incumbent re-elected.	▌ ✓ Claude A. Swanson (Democratic) 52.3%; ▌G. W. Cornett (Republican) 41.0%; ▌G. W. Hale (Populist) 5.5%; ▌W. T. Shelton (Prohibition) 1.2%
Virginia 6	Paul C. Edmunds	Democratic	1886	Incumbent retired. Democratic hold.	▌ ✓ Peter J. Otey (Democratic) 47.1%; ▌J. Hampton Hoge (Republican) 36.8%; ▌O. C. Rucker (Populist) 15.8%; ▌Frank Smith (Independent) 0.2%
Virginia 7	Smith S. Turner	Democratic	1894 (special)	Incumbent re-elected.	▌ ✓ Smith S. Turner (Democratic) 52.1%; ▌Robert J. Walker (Republican) 44.8%; Others: ▌Jacob S. Hopkins (Prohibition) 1.9%; ▌G. T. Barbee (Populist) 1.2%
Virginia 8	Elisha E. Meredith	Democratic	1891 (special)	Incumbent re-elected.	▌ ✓ Elisha E. Meredith (Democratic) 54.3%; ▌P. H. McCaul (Republican) 42.5%; ▌J. S. Mason (Populist) 3.2%
Virginia 9	James W. Marshall	Democratic	1892	Incumbent lost renomination. Republican gain.	▌ ✓ James A. Walker (Republican) 51.2%; ▌H. S. Morison (Democratic) 47.8%; ▌H. B. Howe (Populist) 1.0%
Virginia 10	Henry St. George Tucker	Democratic	1888	Incumbent re-elected.	▌ ✓ Henry St. George Tucker (Democratic) 50.4%; ▌Jacob Yost (Republican) 46.7%; Others: ▌Edmund Randolph Cocke (Populist) 1.6%; ▌C. H. Grove (Prohibition) 1.1%; ▌James S. Cowden (Independent) 0.2%

== Washington ==
District	Incumbent			This race	
District	Member	Party	First elected	Results	Candidates
Washington at-large (2 seats elected on a general ticket)	John L. Wilson	Republican	1889	Retired to run for US Senator. Republican hold.	▌ ✓ William H. Doolittle (Republican) 23.5%; ▌ ✓ Samuel C. Hyde (Republican) 23.0%; ▌ W. P. C. Adams (Populist) 17.3%; ▌ J. C. Van Patten (Populist) 16.8%; ▌ Benjamin F. Heuston (Democratic) 9.6%; ▌ Nathan T. Caton (Democratic) 9.5%; ▌ W. W. Van Dusen (Prohibition) 0.1%; ▌ B. F. Brown (Prohibition) 0.1%; ▌ Lawrence E. Doyle (Independent) 0.1%
Washington at-large (2 seats elected on a general ticket)	William H. Doolittle	Republican	1892	Incumbent re-elected.	▌ ✓ William H. Doolittle (Republican) 23.5%; ▌ ✓ Samuel C. Hyde (Republican) 23.0%; ▌ W. P. C. Adams (Populist) 17.3%; ▌ J. C. Van Patten (Populist) 16.8%; ▌ Benjamin F. Heuston (Democratic) 9.6%; ▌ Nathan T. Caton (Democratic) 9.5%; ▌ W. W. Van Dusen (Prohibition) 0.1%; ▌ B. F. Brown (Prohibition) 0.1%; ▌ Lawrence E. Doyle (Independent) 0.1%

== West Virginia ==
District	Incumbent			This race	
District	Member	Party	First elected	Results	Candidates
West Virginia 1	John O. Pendleton	Democratic	1890	Incumbent lost renomination. Republican gain.	▌ ✓ Blackburn B. Dovener (Republican) 53.40%; ▌John A. Howard (Democratic) 42.52%; ▌John E. Stealey (Populist) 2.15%; ▌J. Howard Holt (Prohibition) 1.93%
West Virginia 2	William Lyne Wilson	Democratic	1882	Incumbent lost re-election. Republican gain.	▌ ✓ Alston G. Dayton (Republican) 51.83%; ▌William Lyne Wilson (Democratic) 47.30%; ▌John T. Jarmey (Populist) 0.74%; ▌Ulysses A. Clayton (Prohibition) 0.12%
West Virginia 3	John D. Alderson	Democratic	1888	Incumbent lost re-election. Republican gain.	▌ ✓ James H. Huling (Republican) 53.51%; ▌John D. Alderson (Democratic) 44.57%; ▌Samuel A. Houston (Populist) 1.85%; ▌A. D. McBrowning (Prohibition) 0.08%
West Virginia 4	James Capehart	Democratic	1890	Incumbent retired. Republican gain.	▌ ✓ Warren Miller (Republican) 52.00%; ▌Thomas H. Harvey (Democratic) 44.38%; ▌Sampson H. Piersol (Populist) 3.55%; ▌W. H. Shaw (Prohibition) 0.08%

== Wisconsin ==
Wisconsin elected ten members of congress on Election Day, November 6, 1894.

District	Incumbent			This race	
District	Member	Party	First elected	Results	Candidates
Wisconsin 1	Henry Allen Cooper	Republican	1892	Incumbent re-elected.	▌ ✓ Henry Allen Cooper (Republican) 56.7%; ▌Andrew Kull (Democratic) 31.8%; ▌Hamilton Utley (Populist) 7.3%; ▌Alex S. Kaye (Prohibition) 7.3%
Wisconsin 2	Charles Barwig	Democratic	1888	Incumbent lost re-election. Republican gain.	▌ ✓ Edward Sauerhering (Republican) 47.9%; ▌Charles Barwig (Democratic) 47.2%; ▌J. J. Sutton (Prohibition) 3.8%; ▌B. W. Hewitt (Populist) 1.2%
Wisconsin 3	Joseph W. Babcock	Republican	1892	Incumbent re-elected.	▌ ✓ Joseph W. Babcock (Republican) 58.2%; ▌Cyrus M. Butt (Democratic) 38.2%; ▌John C. Martin (Prohibition) 3.6%
Wisconsin 4	Peter J. Somers	Democratic	1893	Incumbent declined re-nomination. Republican gain.	▌ ✓ Theobald Otjen (Republican) 47.9%; ▌David Stuart Rose (Democratic) 33.0%; ▌Henry Smith (Populist) 19.2%
Wisconsin 5	George H. Brickner	Democratic	1888	Incumbent declined re-nomination. Republican gain.	▌ ✓ Samuel S. Barney (Republican) 52.6%; ▌Henry Blank (Democratic) 36.7%; ▌Fred C. Runge (Populist) 10.7%
Wisconsin 6	Owen A. Wells	Democratic	1892	Incumbent lost re-election. Republican gain.	▌ ✓ Samuel A. Cook (Republican) 55.8%; ▌Owen A. Wells (Democratic) 38.3%; ▌Riley S. Bishop (Populist) 3.4%; ▌Byron E. Van Keuren (Prohibition) 2.5%
Wisconsin 7	George B. Shaw	Republican	1892	Incumbent died August 27, 1894. Republican hold.	▌ ✓ Michael Griffin (Republican) 57.4%; ▌George W. Levis (Democratic) 32.8%; ▌Clement H. Van Worner (Populist) 5.3%; ▌Edward Berg (Prohibition) 4.1%; ▌William F. Button (Independent) 0.4%
Wisconsin 8	Lyman E. Barnes	Democratic	1892	Incumbent lost re-election. Republican gain.	▌ ✓ Edward S. Minor (Republican) 54.2%; ▌Lyman E. Barnes (Democratic) 42.3%; ▌John Faville (Prohibition) 2.6%; ▌Andrew J. Larabee (Populist) 0.9%
Wisconsin 9	Thomas Lynch	Democratic	1890	Incumbent lost re-election. Republican gain.	▌ ✓ Alexander Stewart (Republican) 56.0%; ▌Thomas Lynch (Democratic) 36.7%; ▌John F. Miles (Populist) 5.4%; ▌John J. Sherman (Prohibition) 1.9%
Wisconsin 10	Nils P. Haugen	Republican	1892	Incumbent declined re-nomination. Republican hold.	▌ ✓ John J. Jenkins (Republican) 57.9%; ▌E. C. Kennedy (Democratic) 26.4%; ▌William Munro (Populist) 11.2%; ▌John Holt (Prohibition) 4.5%

== Wyoming ==
District	Incumbent			This race	
District	Member	Party	First elected	Results	Candidates
Wyoming at-large	Henry A. Coffeen	Democratic	1892	Incumbent lost re-election. Republican gain.	▌ ✓ Frank W. Mondell (Republican) 52.64%; ▌Henry A. Coffeen (Democratic) 32.17%; ▌Shakespeare E. Sealey (Populist) 15.19%

== Non-voting delegates ==
=== Oklahoma Territory ===
District	Incumbent			This race	
District	Member	Party	First elected	Results	Candidates
Oklahoma Territory at-large	Dennis T. Flynn	Republican	1892	Incumbent re-elected.	▌ ✓ Dennis T. Flynn (Republican) 42.17%; ▌R. Beaumont (Note: Full name unavailable.) (Populist) 32.97%; ▌Joseph Wisby (Democratic) 24.86%

== See also ==
- 1894 United States elections
  - 1894–95 United States Senate elections
- 53rd United States Congress
- 54th United States Congress

== Bibliography ==
- Republican Congressional Committee, Republican Campaign Text Book: 1894 (1894).
- Jensen, Richard. The Winning of the Midwest: Social and Political Conflict, 1888–1896 (1971).
- Dubin, Michael J. (March 1, 1998). United States Congressional Elections, 1788–1997: The Official Results of the Elections of the 1st Through 105th Congresses. McFarland and Company. ISBN 978-0786402830.
- Martis, Kenneth C. (January 1, 1989). The Historical Atlas of Political Parties in the United States Congress, 1789-1989. Macmillan Publishing Company. ISBN 978-0029201701.
- Moore, John L., ed. (1994). Congressional Quarterly's Guide to U.S. Elections (Third ed.). Congressional Quarterly Inc. ISBN 978-0871879967.
- "Party Divisions of the House of Representatives 1789–Present". Office of the Historian, House of United States House of Representatives.
