= Senator Youngblood =

Senator Youngblood may refer to:

- Charles N. Youngblood Jr. (1932–2017), Michigan State Senate
- Edward Youngblood (born 1939), Maine State Senate
- Francis M. Youngblood (1835–1907), Illinois State Senate
