= Walter F. Osborne =

American journalist, hotel owner and government official

Walter F. Osborne was an American journalist, hotel owner, and government official from Gloucester, Massachusetts.

== Early life ==
Osborne was born in Vermont. In 1886, he graduated from Dartmouth College. While at Dartmouth, Osborne was a member of the Dartmouth Big Green baseball team.

== Business career ==
After college, Osborne went to work as a reporter for the Springfield Republican. In 1890 moved to Gloucester and became a Cape Ann correspondent for the Boston Herald.

In 1893, Osborne acquired an interest in East Gloucester's Harbor View Hotel. In 1896 he was assaulted by a patron during a dispute over the guest's cousin's bill. Around 1903, he left the Herald to go into the hotel business full-time.

== Politics ==
Osborne's first political involvement came as a member of the Democratic Party. Around 1896 he switched to the Republican Party. In 1899 he was elected to the Gloucester Republican Committee as a representative from Ward 1. He represented Ward 1 on the Gloucester Commons Council and was the president of that body in 1903.

=== Collector of Customs ===
In 1911, U.S. Representative Augustus Peabody Gardner chose to base his recommendation for Collector of Customs for the Port of Gloucester on balloting in Gloucester. The incumbent collector William H. Jordan and Gloucester Republican City Committee Chairman Ralph W. Dennen both ran for the position. Osborne initially supported Jordan, as Osborne did not believe anyone was going challenge him, but switched his endorsement when Dennen entered the race. Jordan won the race handedly, however, there was ample evidence that many of the ballots turned in were filled out fraudulently. According to Gardner, the signatures on many of the ballots voting for Jordan were obvious imitations or bore absolutely no resemblance to the genuine signatures of the men who were propertied to have signed it. Some of the signatures even contained misspellings of the alleged voter's name or initials. A number of ballots also appeared to be written by the same hand. As a result of this fraud, Gardner refused to recommend Jordan. However, because he believed Jordan would still have won without the fraudulent ballots, he refused to recommend Dennen as well. Instead he recommended that Osborne be nominated for the position. Although he was not recommended by Gardner, Jordan went to Washington to make a case for his reappointment. After Jordan's presentation, President William Howard Taft was torn between the two men. However, he chose to appoint Osborne based on the recommendation of Treasury Secretary Franklin MacVeagh.

As Collector, Osborne oversaw a Customs district that included Gloucester, Rockport, Manachester, and Essex. He supervised a staff of fifteen Customs employees and the use of the Customs yacht, Dreamer. He received a salary of $300 a year, however various fees were estimated to put his pay between $4,000 and $5,000 a year. Osborne remained Collector until July 1, 1913, when all customs districts in Massachusetts were combined into one district and the position was eliminated.

== Personal life and death ==
In 1895, Osborne married Harriet C. Brazier. In addition to their home in Gloucester, the Osbornes also had a winter home in Brighton.

Osborne died on October 8, 1918, due to complications from surgery.

Preceded by William H. Jordan	Collector of Customs for the Port of Gloucester; 1912–1913	Succeeded by Position eliminated
