= William Frederick Sapp =

American politician (1856–1917)

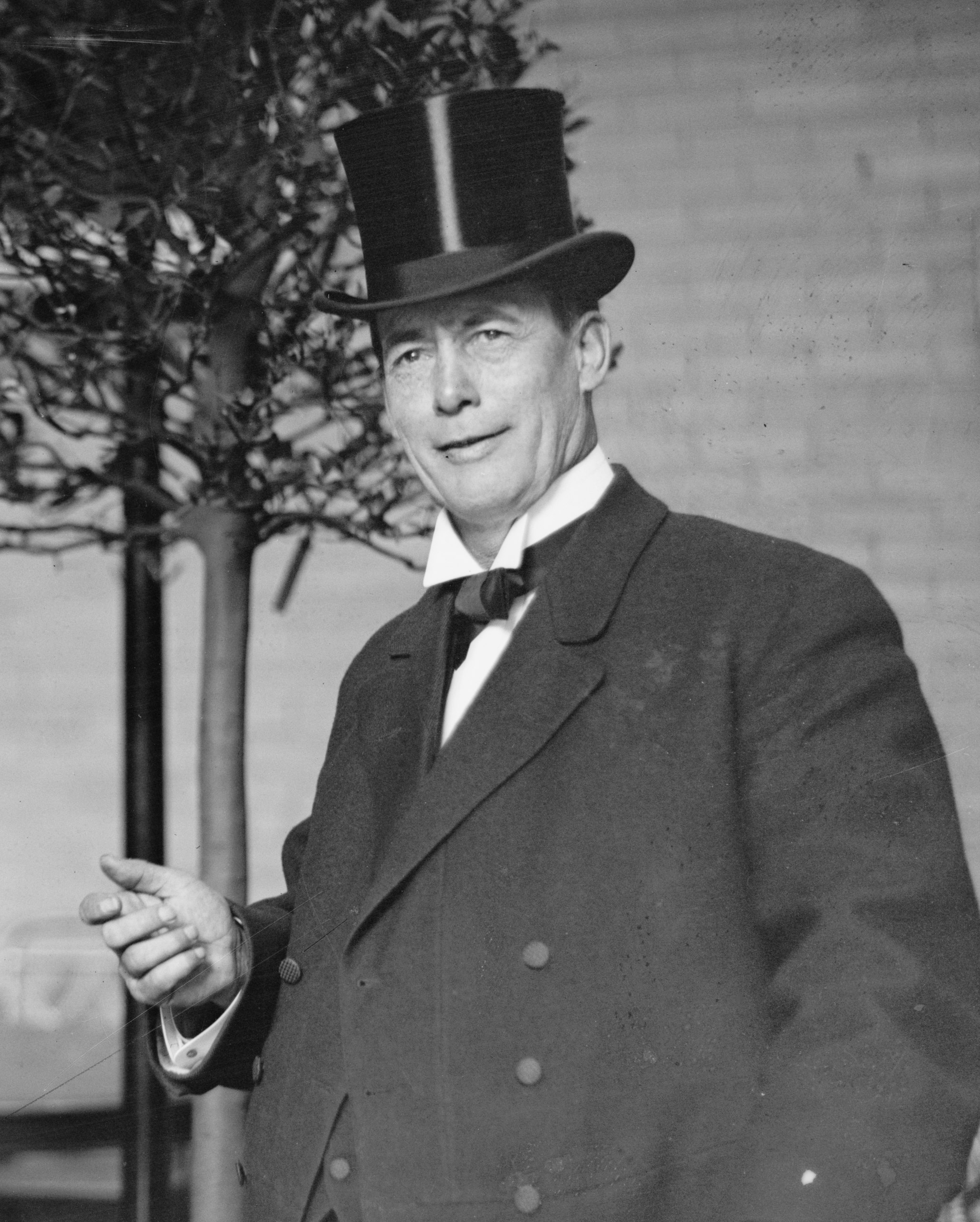
- Born: August 30, 1856; Grand Rapids, Michigan
- Died: March 8, 1917 (aged 60); Galena, Kansas
- Spouse: Mary E. Wood
- Parent(s): Rezin Sapp; Margaret E. Ferry

William Frederick Sapp (August 30, 1856 – March 8, 1917) was an unsuccessful Democratic party candidate for the state of Kansas in the United States House of Representatives elections of 1894. He was a member of Democratic National Committee from Kansas.

== Biography ==
Sapp was born on August 30, 1856, in Grand Rapids, Michigan, to Rezin Sapp and Margaret E. Ferry. His father was a Methodist minister.

Sapp married Mary E. Wood on October 29, 1885, in Quincy, Illinois. She was the daughter of Daniel Wood and Mary Abernethy.

Sapp was an unsuccessful Democratic party candidate for the state of Kansas in the United States House of Representatives elections of 1894. He was the Kansas Democratic state chair from 1904 to 1906. He was a member of Democratic National Committee from Kansas in 1912.

Sapp died on March 8, 1917, in Galena, Kansas. He was buried in Oak Hill Cemetery.
