= William H. Jordan (merchant) =

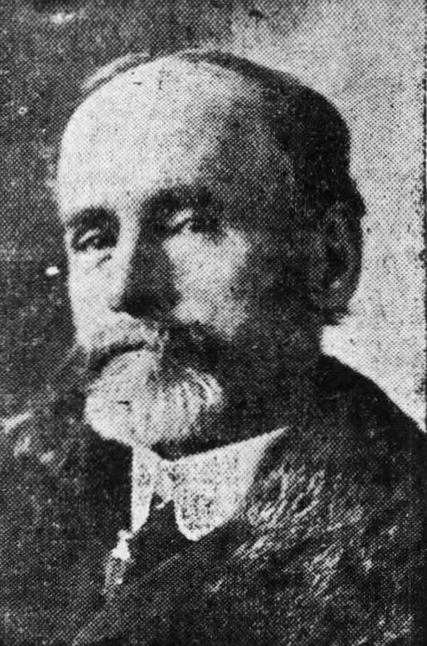
- Born: 1845 or 1846; Rockport, Massachusetts, U.S.
- Died: July 2, 1923 (aged 77); Gloucester, Massachusetts, U.S.
- Occupation: Merchant

William H. Jordan (1845 or 1846 – July 2, 1923) was an American herring merchant from Gloucester, Massachusetts.

== Early life ==
Jordan was born in Rockport, Massachusetts. When he was about three years old his family moved to Gloucester. He enlisted in the Union Army on September 15, 1862, and was discharged as a corporal on July 18, 1864.

== Business career ==
For many years Jordan was the leading herring merchant in the United States. The Boston Daily Globe described him as "one of the most aggressive, daring and progressive men in the fishing business". He began his career in the fishing industry with the firm of Pettengill & Cunningham. He later worked as a clerk for Smith & Rowe. He then became a junior partner in the firm of Rowe & Jordan with Captain Joseph Rowe. When Rowe retired, Jordan ran the business under the name of W. H. Jordan & Co. He was heavily involved in the herring and mackerel business in Newfoundland. His schooner, the Grayling, was one of the most advanced of its time.

== Politics ==
In 1899, President William McKinley, based on the recommendation of U.S. Representative William Henry Moody, nominated Jordan for the position of Collector of Customs for the Port of Gloucester. His nomination was opposed by ex-collector William A. Pew who sought to return to the position. Jordan was confirmed by the United States Senate and was reappointed by Theodore Roosevelt in 1904 and 1908.

In 1911, U.S. Representative Augustus Peabody Gardner chose to base his recommendation for collector on balloting in Gloucester. Jordan was challenged for the position by Gloucester Republican City Committee Chairman Ralph W. Dennen. Jordan won the race handily, however, there was ample evidence that many of the ballots turned in were filled out fraudulently. As a result of this fraud, Gardner refused to recommend Jordan. However, because he believed Jordan would still have won without the fraudulent ballots, he refused to recommend Dennen as well. Instead he recommended that Walter F. Osborne be nominated for the position. Jordan went to Washington to make a case for his reappointment. After Jordan's presentation, President William Howard Taft was torn between the two men. However, he chose to appoint Osborne based on the recommendation of Treasury Secretary Franklin MacVeagh.

Jordan was also a member of the Gloucester School Committee for 40 years.

== Death ==
Jordan died on July 2, 1923, at his home in Gloucester.

Preceded by Frank C. Richardson	Collector of Customs for the Port of Gloucester; 1900–1912	Succeeded by Walter F. Osborne
