= 1890 United States House of Representatives elections in Florida =

United States House of Representatives elections in Florida, 1890
- November 4, 1890

Both of Florida's seats to the United States House of Representatives
	Majority party	Minority party
Party	Democratic	Republican
Last election	2	0
Seats won	2	0
Seat change	Steady	Steady
Popular vote	29,267	15,209
Percentage	65.8%	34.2%

Elections to the United States House of Representatives in Florida for the 52nd Congress were held November 4, 1890.

== Background ==
At the time of the 1890 election, Florida had two Representatives in the House of Representatives, both Democrats. In the 1st district, Robert H. M. Davidson was in his seventh term, having been first elected in 1876, while the 2nd district was represented by Robert Bullock in his first term.

== Election results ==
Robert H. M. Davidson did not win renomination for Congress.

1890 United States House election results
District	Democratic			Republican		
1st	Stephen R. Mallory, Jr.	12,467	78.5%	Harrison Reed	3,415	21.5%
2nd	Robert Bullock (I)	16,800	58.8%	Joseph Stripling	11,794	41.2%

== See also ==
- United States House of Representatives elections, 1890
