= Francis M. Youngblood =

American politician

Francis Marion Youngblood (March 15, 1835 – December 12, 1907) was an American politician and lawyer from Illinois. He served as a member of both the Illinois Senate and House of Representatives as a Democrat.

== Biography ==
Youngblood was born on a farm near Sunfield, Illinois in Perry County, Illinois. He went to the public schools. In 1859, he was elected county treasurer for Perry County. Youngblood owned a blacksmith shop in Tamaroa, Illinois and taught school. Youngblood studied law and was admitted to the Illinois bar in 1862. He practiced law in Du Quoin, Illinois.

In 1862, Youngblood moved with his family to Benton, Illinois and continued to practice law. He served as prosecuting attorney for the Illinois Twenty-Six Circuit from 1868 to 1872. Youngblood served in the Illinois Senate from 1873 to 1877 and was a Democrat. He also served in the Illinois House of Representatives in 1881 and 1882.

In 1887, Youngblood moved to Carbondale, Illinois and continued to practice law. Youngblood died at his home in Carbondale, Illinois.
