= 1898 United States House of Representatives elections =

House elections for the 56th U.S. Congress

- June 6, September 6, September 12, and November 8, 1898 (Note: Regulars only, not including specials)

All 357 seats in the United States House of Representatives 179 seats needed for a majority
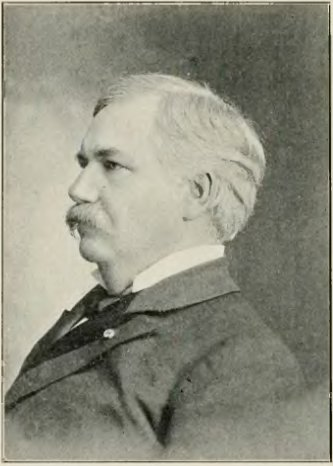

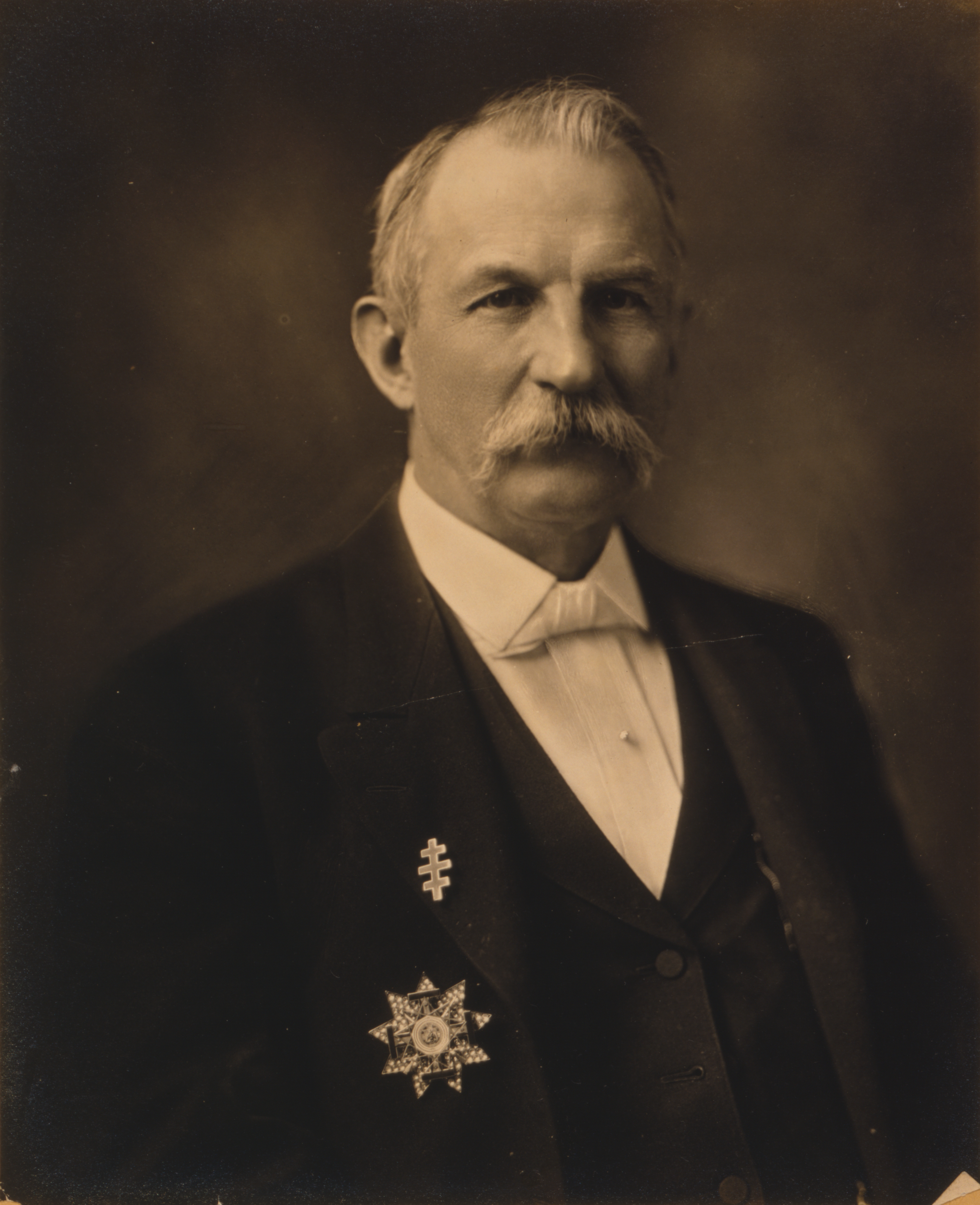
	Majority party	Minority party
Leader	David Henderson	James Richardson
Party	Republican	Democratic
Leader since	March 4, 1899	March 4, 1899
Leader's seat	Iowa 3rd	Tennessee 5th
Last election	206 seats	124 seats
Seats won	187	161
Seat change	▼19	▲37
Popular vote	5,305,230	4,828,592
Percentage	48.55%	44.18%
Swing	▼0.22pp	▲3.19pp
	Third party	Fourth party
Party	Populist	Silver Republican
Last election	22	2
Seats won	5	2
Seat change	▼17	Steady
Popular vote	463,059	60,805
Percentage	4.24%	0.56%
Swing	▼2.62pp	▼0.46pp
	Fifth party	Sixth party
Party	Silver	Independent
Last election	1	1
Seats won	1	1 (Note: 1 Independent Populist)
Seat change	Steady	Steady
Popular vote	5,766	96,537
Percentage	0.05%	0.88%
Swing	Steady	▲0.31pp
- Results: Democratic gain Republican gain Democratic hold Republican hold Populist hold Silver hold Silver Republican gain Silver Republican hold Independent gain Independent hold
Speaker before election
Thomas Reed
Republican
Elected Speaker
David Henderson
Republican

The 1898 United States House of Representatives elections were held for the most part on November 8, 1898, with Oregon, Maine, and Vermont holding theirs early in either June or September. They were held during the middle of President William McKinley's first term. Elections were held for 357 seats of the United States House of Representatives, representing 45 states, to serve in the 56th United States Congress. Special elections were also held throughout the year.

As in many midterm elections, the President's Republican Party lost seats, but was able to hold a majority over the Democratic Party. The Populist Party also lost many seats, as their movement began to decline. This was likely because many Populists rallied behind William Jennings Bryan's increasingly powerful branch of the Democratic Party, which built the rural economic issues advocated by Populists into their platform. As a result, the Democrats won a number of Western seats as well many in the Mid-Atlantic.

== Election summaries ==
↓
161	9	187
Democratic	(Note: There were 6 Populists, 1 Silver, and 2 Silver Republicans)	Republican

State	Type	Total seats	Democratic		Populist		Republican		Silver/ Silver Rep.	
State	Type	Total seats	Seats	Change	Seats	Change	Seats	Change	Seats	Change
Alabama	District	9	8	▲1	0	▼1	1	Steady	0	Steady
Arkansas	District	6	6	Steady	0	Steady	0	Steady	0	Steady
California	District	7	1	▼1	0	▼2	6	▲3	0	Steady
Colorado	District	2	0	Steady	1	Steady	0	Steady	1 (Note: Member of the Silver Republican Party faction elected.)	Steady
Connecticut	District	4	0	Steady	0	Steady	4	Steady	0	Steady
Delaware	At-large	1	0	▼1	0	Steady	1	▲1	0	Steady
Florida	District	2	2	Steady	0	Steady	0	Steady	0	Steady
Georgia	District	11	11	Steady	0	Steady	0	Steady	0	Steady
Idaho	At-large	1	0	Steady	0	▼1	0	Steady	1	▲1
Illinois	District	22	8	▲3	0	Steady	14	▼3	0	Steady
Indiana	District	13	4	Steady	0	Steady	9	Steady	0	Steady
Iowa	District	11	0	Steady	0	Steady	11	Steady	0	Steady
Kansas	District +at-large	8	0	Steady	1	▼5	7	▲5	0	Steady
Kentucky	District	11	9	▲2	0	Steady	2	▼2	0	Steady
Louisiana	District	6	6	Steady	0	Steady	0	Steady	0	Steady
Maine	District	4	0	Steady	0	Steady	4	Steady	0	Steady
Maryland	District	6	2	▲2	0	Steady	4	▼2	0	Steady
Massachusetts	District	13	3	▲2	0	Steady	10	▼2	0	Steady
Michigan	District	12	0	▼2	0	Steady	12	▲2	0	Steady
Minnesota	District	7	0	Steady	0	Steady	7	Steady	0	Steady
Mississippi	District	7	7	Steady	0	Steady	0	Steady	0	Steady
Missouri	District	15	12	Steady	0	Steady	3	Steady	0	Steady
Montana	At-large	1	1	▲1	0	Steady	0	Steady	0	▼1
Nebraska	District	6	1	▲1	3	▼1	2	Steady	0	Steady
Nevada	At-large	1	0	Steady	0	Steady	0	Steady	1	Steady
New Hampshire	District	2	0	Steady	0	Steady	2	Steady	0	Steady
New Jersey	District	8	2	▲2	0	Steady	6	▼2	0	Steady
New York	District	34	18	▲12	0	Steady	16	▼12	0	Steady
North Carolina	District	9	5	▲4	1 (Note: Includes 1 Independent Populist)	▼4	3	1	0	Steady
North Dakota	At-large	1	0	Steady	0	Steady	1	Steady	0	Steady
Ohio	District	21	6	Steady	0	Steady	15	Steady	0	Steady
Oregon	District	2	0	Steady	0	Steady	2	Steady	0	Steady
Pennsylvania	District +2 at-large	30	10	▲7	0	Steady	20	▼7	0	Steady
Rhode Island	District	2	0	Steady	0	Steady	2	Steady	0	Steady
South Carolina	District	7	7	Steady	0	Steady	0	Steady	0	Steady
South Dakota	At-large	2	0	Steady	0	▼2	2	▲2	0	Steady
Tennessee	District	10	8	Steady	0	Steady	2	Steady	0	Steady
Texas	District	13	12	Steady	0	Steady	1	Steady	0	Steady
Utah	At-large	1	1	Steady	0	Steady	0	Steady	0	Steady
Vermont	District	2	0	Steady	0	Steady	2	Steady	0	Steady
Virginia	District	10	10	▲4	0	Steady	0	▼4	0	Steady
Washington	At-large	2	0	▼1	0	Steady	2	▲2	0	▼1
West Virginia	District	4	1	▲1	0	Steady	3	▼1	0	Steady
Wisconsin	District	10	0	Steady	0	Steady	10	Steady	0	Steady
Wyoming	At-large	1	0	▼1	0	Steady	1	▲1	0	Steady
Total		357	161 45.1%	▲37	6 1.7%	▼16	187 52.4%	▼20	3 (Note: Includes 2 members of the Silver Republican faction.) 0.8%	▼1

Popular vote
Democratic	44.18%
Independent	0.86%
Populist	4.24%
Republican	48.55%
Silver Republican	0.56%
Silver	0.05%
Others	1.56%

House seats
Democratic	45.10%
Independent	0.28%
Populist	1.40%
Republican	52.38%
Silver Republican	0.56%
Silver	0.28%

The previous elections of 1896 saw the election of 24 Populists, 2 Silver Republicans, and a Silver Party member.

=== Maps ===
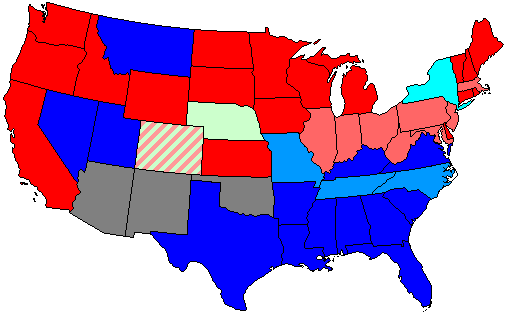
House seats by party holding plurality in state: 80+% Democratic / / 80+% Republican; 60 to 80% Democratic / / 60 to 80% Republican; Up to 60% Democratic / Up to 60% Populist / Up to 60% Republican

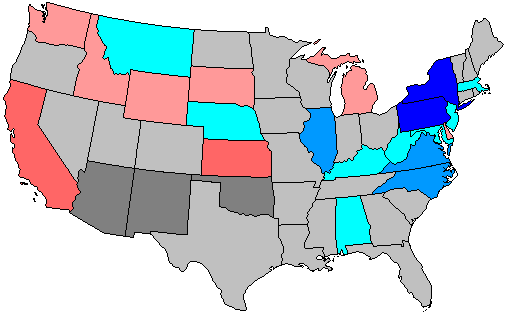
Net gain in party representation: 6+ Democratic gain / / 6+ Republican gain; 3–5 Democratic gain / / 3–5 Republican gain; 1–2 Democratic gain / 1–2 Populist gain / 1–2 Republican gain; No net change

Winner's vote share in each congressional district
Republican vote share in each congressional district

Democratic vote share in each congressional district

Populist vote share in each congressional district

== Special elections ==
District	Incumbent			This race	
District	Member	Party	First elected	Results	Candidates}
Mississippi 2	William V. Sullivan	Democratic	1896	Incumbent resigned when appointed U.S. senator. New member elected July 5, 1898. Democratic hold.	▌ ✓ Thomas Spight (Democratic) 46.64%; ▌Z. M. Stephens (Democratic) 42.17%; ▌Leland L. Pearsons (Democratic) 11.19%
Ohio 19
Pennsylvania 23
Virginia 2
Virginia 4
Mississippi 6	William F. Love	Democratic	1896	Incumbent died October 16, 1898. New member elected November 29, 1898. Democratic hold.	▌ ✓ Frank A. McLain (Democratic) 100%
Massachusetts 15	John Simpkins	Republican	1894	Incumbent died March 27, 1898. Republican hold.	▌ ✓ William S. Greene (Republican) 63.04%; ▌Charles S. Randall (Ind. Republican) 18.17%; ▌Walter P. J. Skahan (Socialist Labor) 10.95%; ▌Charles T. Luce (Democratic) 7.84%

== Election dates ==
All the states held their elections November 8, 1898, except for three states, with eight seats among them:

- June 6: Oregon
- September 6: Vermont
- September 12: Maine

== Alabama ==
District	Incumbent			This race	
District	Member	Party	First elected	Results	Candidates
Alabama 1	George W. Taylor	Democratic	1896	Incumbent re-elected.	▌ ✓ George W. Taylor (Democratic) 84.7%; ▌ Anthony N. Johnson (Colored Republican) 15.3%
Alabama 2	Jesse F. Stallings	Democratic	1892	Incumbent re-elected.	▌ ✓ Jesse F. Stallings (Democratic) 83.3%; ▌ Frank Simmons (Republican) 14.8%; ▌ J. A. Giddings (Prohibition) 1.9%
Alabama 3	Henry D. Clayton Jr.	Democratic	1896	Incumbent re-elected.	▌ ✓ Henry D. Clayton Jr. (Democratic) 96.6%
Alabama 4	William F. Aldrich	Republican	1894	Incumbent lost re-election. Democratic gain.	▌ ✓ Gaston A. Robbins (Democratic) 54.9%; ▌ William F. Aldrich (Republican) 45.1%
Alabama 4	William F. Aldrich	Republican	1894	Election successfully contested. Incumbent re-elected and seated March 8, 1900.	▌ ✓ William F. Aldrich (Republican); ▌ Gaston A. Robbins (Democratic)
Alabama 5	Willis Brewer	Democratic	1896	Incumbent re-elected.	▌ ✓ Willis Brewer (Democratic) 77.8%; ▌ Douglas Smith (Republican) 22.0%
Alabama 6	John H. Bankhead	Democratic	1886	Incumbent re-elected.	▌ ✓ John H. Bankhead (Democratic) 69.8%; ▌ Daniel N. Cooper (Republican) 29.3%; ▌ William Turner (Colored Republican) 0.9%
Alabama 7	Milford W. Howard	Populist	1894	Incumbent retired. Democratic gain.	▌ ✓ John L. Burnett (Democratic) 44.4%; ▌ Oliver Day Street (Populist) 32.2%; ▌ Frank Lathrop (Republican) 23.0%
Alabama 8	Joseph Wheeler	Democratic	1884	Incumbent re-elected.	▌ ✓ Joseph Wheeler (Democratic) 99.9%
Alabama 9	Oscar Underwood	Democratic	1894	Incumbent re-elected.	▌ ✓ Oscar Underwood (Democratic) 85.5%; ▌ John T. McEniry (Republican) 12.6%; ▌ L. F. Schwartz (Colored Republican) 1.9%

== Arkansas ==
District	Incumbent			This race	
District	Member	Party	First elected	Results	Candidates
Arkansas 1	Philip D. McCulloch Jr.	Democratic	1892	Incumbent re-elected.	▌ ✓ Philip D. McCulloch Jr. (Democratic) 99.3%
Arkansas 2	John S. Little	Democratic	1894	Incumbent re-elected.	▌ ✓ John S. Little (Democratic) 99.8%
Arkansas 3	Thomas C. McRae	Democratic	1885	Incumbent re-elected.	▌ ✓ Thomas C. McRae (Democratic) 100.0%
Arkansas 4	William L. Terry	Democratic	1890	Incumbent re-elected.	▌ ✓ William L. Terry (Democratic) 99.0%
Arkansas 5	Hugh A. Dinsmore	Democratic	1892	Incumbent re-elected.	▌ ✓ Hugh A. Dinsmore (Democratic) 71.0%; ▌ J. T. Hopper (Republican) 29.0%
Arkansas 6	Stephen Brundidge Jr.	Democratic	1896	Incumbent re-elected.	▌ ✓ Stephen Brundidge Jr. (Democratic) 99.9%

== California ==
District	Incumbent			This race	
District	Member	Party	First elected	Results	Candidates
California 1	John All Barham	Republican	1894	Incumbent re-elected.	▌ ✓ John All Barham (Republican) 61.1%; ▌Emmett Seawell (Democratic/Populist) 38.9%
California 2	Marion De Vries	Democratic	1896	Incumbent re-elected.	▌ ✓ Marion De Vries (Democratic/Populist) 55.3%; ▌Frank D. Ryan (Republican) 44.7%
California 3	Samuel G. Hilborn	Republican	1894	Incumbent lost renomination. Republican hold.	▌ ✓ Victor H. Metcalf (Republican) 57.3%; ▌John Aubrey Jones (Democratic/Populist) 39.1%; ▌Thomas F. Burns (Socialist Labor) 3.6%
California 4	James G. Maguire	Democratic	1892	Incumbent retired to run for California governor. Republican gain.	▌ ✓ Julius Kahn (Republican) 50.0%; ▌James H. Barry (Democratic/Populist) 44.1%; ▌W. J. Martin (Socialist Labor) 3.7%; ▌Joseph P. Kelly (Ind. Democratic) 2.2%
California 5	Eugene F. Loud	Republican	1890	Incumbent re-elected.	▌ ✓ Eugene F. Loud (Republican) 51.8%; ▌William Craig (Democratic/Populist) 44.3%; ▌E. T. Kingsley (Socialist Labor) 3.9%
California 6	Charles A. Barlow	Populist	1900	Incumbent lost re-election. Republican gain.	▌ ✓ Russell J. Waters (Republican) 52.6%; ▌Charles A. Barlow (Democratic/Populist) 44.9%; ▌James T. Van Ransselear (Socialist Labor) 2.5%
California 7	Curtis H. Castle	Populist	1896	Incumbent lost re-election. Republican gain.	▌ ✓ James C. Needham (Republican) 50.1%; ▌Curtis H. Castle (Democratic/Populist) 49.9%

== Colorado ==
District	Incumbent			This race	
District	Member	Party	First elected	Results	Candidates
Colorado 1	John F. Shafroth	Silver Republican	1894	Incumbent re-elected.	▌ ✓ John F. Shafroth (Fusion) 67.6%; ▌ Charles Hartsell (Republican) 29.1%; ▌ Dayton Gilbert (Prohibition) 2.2%
Colorado 2	John C. Bell	Populist	1892	Incumbent re-elected.	▌ ✓ John C. Bell (Fusion) 64.9%; ▌ B. Clark Wheeler (Republican) 34.2%

== Connecticut ==
District	Incumbent			This race	
District	Member	Party	First elected	Results	Candidates
Connecticut 1	E. Stevens Henry	Republican	1894	Incumbent re-elected.	▌ ✓ E. Stevens Henry (Republican) 55.5%; ▌Robert J. Vance (Democratic) 39.9%; ▌Emil L. G. Hohenthal (Prohibition) 1.2%
Connecticut 2	Nehemiah D. Sperry	Republican	1894	Incumbent re-elected.	▌ ✓ Nehemiah D. Sperry (Republican) 51.9%; ▌James H. Webb (Democratic) 45.2%; ▌Milton R. Kerr (Prohibition) 0.7%
Connecticut 3	Charles A. Russell	Republican	1886	Incumbent re-elected.	▌ ✓ Charles A. Russell (Republican) 58.1%; ▌Charles F. Thayer (Democratic) 40.4%; ▌Stephen Crane (Prohibition) 1.5%
Connecticut 4	Ebenezer J. Hill	Republican	1894	Incumbent re-elected.	▌ ✓ Ebenezer J. Hill (Republican) 56.1%; ▌Charles P. Lyman (Democratic) 42.0%; ▌Charles L. Beach (Prohibition) 0.7%

== Delaware ==
District	Incumbent			This race	
District	Member	Party	First elected	Results	Candidates
Delaware at-large	L. Irving Handy	Democratic	1896	Incumbent lost re-election. Republican gain.	▌ ✓ John H. Hoffecker (Republican) 53.1%; ▌ L. Irving Handy (Democratic) 45.5%; ▌ Lewis M. Price (Prohibition) 1.3%; ▌ John P. Mettler (Social Democratic) 0.1%

== Florida ==
District	Incumbent			This race	
District	Member	Party	First elected	Results	Candidates
Florida 1	Stephen M. Sparkman	Democratic	1894	Incumbent re-elected.	▌ ✓ Stephen M. Sparkman (Democratic) 84.2%; ▌E. R. Gunby (Republican) 15.8%
Florida 2	Robert Wyche Davis	Democratic	1896	Incumbent re-elected.	▌ ✓ Robert Wyche Davis (Democratic) 71.8%; ▌H. L. Anderson (Republican) 28.2%

== Georgia ==
District	Incumbent			This race	
District	Member	Party	First elected	Results	Candidates
Georgia 1	Rufus E. Lester	Democratic	1888	Incumbent re-elected.	▌ ✓ Rufus E. Lester (Democratic) 86.0%; ▌ James E. Myrick (Republican) 14.0%
Georgia 2	James M. Griggs	Democratic	1896	Incumbent re-elected.	▌ ✓ James M. Griggs (Democratic) 80.0%; ▌ J. H. Smith (Republican) 20.0%
Georgia 3	Elijah B. Lewis	Democratic	1896	Incumbent re-elected.	▌ ✓ Elijah B. Lewis (Democratic) 96.2%; ▌ F. W. Gano (Republican) 3.8%
Georgia 4	William C. Adamson	Democratic	1896	Incumbent re-elected.	▌ ✓ William C. Adamson (Democratic) 99.1%
Georgia 5	Leonidas F. Livingston	Democratic	1890	Incumbent re-elected.	▌ ✓ Leonidas F. Livingston (Democratic) 97.6%
Georgia 6	Charles L. Bartlett	Democratic	1894	Incumbent re-elected.	▌ ✓ Charles L. Bartlett (Democratic) 99.9%
Georgia 7	John W. Maddox	Democratic	1892	Incumbent re-elected.	▌ ✓ John W. Maddox (Democratic) 80.7%; ▌ A. B. Austin (Populist) 19.1%
Georgia 8	William M. Howard	Democratic	1896	Incumbent re-elected.	▌ ✓ William M. Howard (Democratic) 83.5%; ▌ John A. Neese (Populist) 16.4%
Georgia 9	Farish Tate	Democratic	1892	Incumbent re-elected.	▌ ✓ Farish Tate (Democratic) 72.3%; ▌ J. P. Brooke (Populist) 27.7%
Georgia 10	William H. Fleming	Democratic	1896	Incumbent re-elected.	▌ ✓ William H. Fleming (Democratic) 97.6%
Georgia 11	William G. Brantley	Democratic	1896	Incumbent re-elected.	▌ ✓ William G. Brantley (Democratic) 69.2%; ▌ J. M. Wilkinson (Republican/Populist) 30.8%

== Idaho ==
District	Incumbent			This race	
District	Member	Party	First elected	Results	Candidates
Idaho at-large	James Gunn	Populist	1896	Incumbent lost re-election. Silver Republican gain.	▌ ✓ Edgar Wilson (Silver Republican/Democratic) 45.26%; ▌Weldon B. Heyburn (Republican) 33.40%; ▌James Gunn (Populist) 19.00%; ▌William J. Boone (Prohibition) 2.34%

== Illinois ==
District	Incumbent			This race	
District	Member	Party	First elected	Results	Candidates
Illinois 1	James Robert Mann	Republican	1896	Incumbent re-elected.	▌ ✓ James Robert Mann (Republican) 63.2%; ▌ Rollin B. Organ (Democratic) 34.4%; ▌ B. Berlyn (Socialist Labor) 1.0%; ▌ Theodore L. Neff (Prohibition) 0.7%; ▌ James Hogan (Populist) 0.7%
Illinois 2	William Lorimer	Republican	1894	Incumbent re-elected.	▌ ✓ William Lorimer (Republican) 52.1%; ▌ C. Porter Johnson (Democratic) 44.8%; ▌ C. O. Sherman (Populist) 1.3%; ▌ Herman Glaser (Socialist Labor) 0.8%; ▌ Thomas H. Conpropst (Prohibition) 0.8%; ▌ Michael Healy (Independent) 0.2%
Illinois 3	Hugh R. Belknap	Republican	1894	Incumbent lost re-election. Democratic gain.	▌ ✓ George Peter Foster (Democratic) 53.3%; ▌ Hugh R. Belknap (Republican) 45.2%; ▌ Henry O. Dreisvogt (Socialist Labor) 0.7%; ▌ James E. McGrath (Populist) 0.7%; ▌ William Kellet (Prohibition) 0.1%
Illinois 4	Daniel W. Mills	Republican	1896	Incumbent lost re-election. Democratic gain.	▌ ✓ Thomas Cusack (Democratic) 52.6%; ▌ Daniel W. Mills (Republican) 46.4%; ▌ John P. Buchanan (Populist) 0.6%; ▌ Thomas H. Gault (Prohibition) 0.4%
Illinois 5	George E. White	Republican	1894	Incumbent lost re-election. Democratic gain.	▌ ✓ Edward Thomas Noonan (Democratic) 53.3%; ▌ George E. White (Republican) 44.5%; ▌ William League (Populist) 0.9%; ▌ J. Collins (Socialist Labor) 0.8%; ▌ Thomas Haines (Prohibition) 0.5%
Illinois 6	Henry Sherman Boutell	Republican	1897	Incumbent re-elected.	▌ ✓ Henry Sherman Boutell (Republican) 50.7%; ▌ Emil Hoechster (Democratic) 47.6%; ▌ Roy M. Goodwin (Populist) 0.6%; ▌ George Henderson (Socialist Labor) 0.2%; ▌ John G. Battershill (Prohibition) 0.2%
Illinois 7	George E. Foss	Republican	1894	Incumbent re-elected	▌ ✓ George E. Foss (Republican) 60.8%; ▌ Frank O. Rogers (Democratic) 36.5%; ▌ Charles Schmitt (Socialist Labor) 1.1%; ▌ Henry H. Hardinge (Populist) 0.8%; ▌ Vasscher B. Barnes (Prohibition) 0.8%
Illinois 8	Albert J. Hopkins	Republican	1885	Incumbent re-elected	▌ ✓ Albert J. Hopkins (Republican) 68.2%; ▌ John W. Leonard (Democratic) 27.8%; ▌ Sheldon W. Johnson (Prohibition) 4.0%
Illinois 9	Robert R. Hitt	Republican	1882	Incumbent re-elected.	▌ ✓ Robert R. Hitt (Republican) 64.9%; ▌ William H. Wagner (Democratic) 32.3%; ▌ John E. Countryman (Prohibition) 2.8%
Illinois 10	George W. Prince	Republican	1895	Incumbent re-elected.	▌ ✓ George W. Prince (Republican) 66.1%; ▌ Francis E. Andrews (Democratic) 32.5%; ▌ Eugenio K. Hayes (Prohibition) 1.4%
Illinois 11	Walter Reeves	Republican	1894	Incumbent re-elected.	▌ ✓ Walter Reeves (Republican) 53.5%; ▌ Maurice T. Moloney (Democratic) 44.1%; ▌ John W. Hosier (Prohibition) 1.7%; ▌ Archibald Storrie (Populist) 0.7%
Illinois 12	Joseph Gurney Cannon	Republican	1892	Incumbent re-elected.	▌ ✓ Joseph Gurney Cannon (Republican) 59.1%; ▌ John M. Thompson (Democratic) 39.0%; ▌ Samuel S. Jones (Prohibition) 1.9%
Illinois 13	Vespasian Warner	Republican	1894	Incumbent re-elected.	▌ ✓ Vespasian Warner (Republican) 56.6%; ▌ Jerome G. Quisenbery (Democratic) 41.1%; ▌ James M. Shaw (Prohibition) 2.3%
Illinois 14	Joseph V. Graff	Republican	1894	Incumbent re-elected.	▌ ✓ Joseph V. Graff (Republican) 51.6%; ▌ Charles N. Barnes (Democratic) 46.8%; ▌ Stephen Martin (Prohibition) 1.6%
Illinois 15	Benjamin F. Marsh	Republican	1876	Incumbent re-elected.	▌ ✓ Benjamin F. Marsh (Republican) 49.1%; ▌ Joseph A. Roy (Democratic) 48.6%; ▌ M. W. Greer (Prohibition) 2.3%
Illinois 16	William H. Hinrichsen	Democratic	1896	Incumbent retired. Democratic hold.	▌ ✓ William E. Williams (Democratic) 54.6%; ▌ James H. Danskin (Republican) 42.9%; ▌ A. C. Wood (Populist) 1.3%; ▌ Howard C. Bliss (Prohibition) 1.2%
Illinois 17	James A. Connolly	Republican	1894	Incumbent retired. Democratic gain.	▌ ✓ Ben F. Caldwell (Democratic) 51.9%; ▌ Isaac R. Mills (Republican) 46.9%; ▌ David L. Bunn (Prohibition) 1.2%
Illinois 18	Thomas M. Jett	Democratic	1896	Incumbent re-elected.	▌ ✓ Thomas M. Jett (Democratic) 49.5%; ▌ Benjamin F. Johnston (Republican) 47.6%; ▌ John T. Killian (Prohibition) 1.3%; ▌ F. Morse (Populist) 1.2%; ▌ W. W. Cox (Socialist Labor) 0.4%
Illinois 19	Andrew J. Hunter	Democratic	1896	Incumbent retired. Democratic hold.	▌ ✓ Joseph B. Crowley (Democratic) 50.5%; ▌ William W. Jacobs (Republican) 47.0%; ▌ Dickson T. Harbison (Populist) 1.4%; ▌ William Smith (Prohibition) 1.1%
Illinois 20	James R. Campbell	Democratic	1896	Incumbent retired. Democratic hold.	▌ ✓ James R. Williams (Democratic) 51.5%; ▌ Theodore G. Risley (Republican) 45.9%; ▌ Wiley N. Green (Populist) 1.6%; ▌ William Bedall (Prohibition) 1.0%
Illinois 21	Jehu Baker	Democratic	1896	Incumbent retired. Republican gain.	▌ ✓ William A. Rodenberg (Republican) 49.1%; ▌ Fred J. Kern (Democratic) 47.9%; ▌ William F. Quellmalz (Populist) 1.2%; ▌ John T. Nixon (Prohibition) 1.0%; ▌ Gustav Surber (Socialist Labor) 0.8%
Illinois 22	George Washington Smith	Republican	1888	Incumbent re-elected.	▌ ✓ George Washington Smith (Republican) 54.5%; ▌ A. B. Garrett (Democratic) 44.8%; ▌ Andrew J. Dougherty Jr. (Prohibition) 0.7%

== Indiana ==
District	Incumbent			This race	
District	Member	Party	First elected	Results	Candidates
Indiana 1	James A. Hemenway	Republican	1894	Incumbent re-elected.	▌ ✓ James A. Hemenway (Republican) 50.7%; ▌ Thomas Duncan (Democratic) 48.1%; ▌ Josephus Lee (Prohibition) 1.2%
Indiana 2	Robert W. Miers	Democratic	1896	Incumbent re-elected.	▌ ✓ Robert W. Miers (Democratic) 50.3%; ▌ William R. Gardiner (Republican) 46.4%; ▌ William J. Trout (Populist) 3.3%
Indiana 3	William T. Zenor	Democratic	1896	Incumbent re-elected.	▌ ✓ William T. Zenor (Democratic) 55.2%; ▌ Isaac F. Whiteside (Republican) 43.9%; ▌ George T. Mayfield (Prohibition) 0.9%
Indiana 4	Francis M. Griffith	Democratic	1897	Incumbent re-elected.	▌ ✓ Francis M. Griffith (Democratic) 52.2%; ▌ Charles W. Lee (Republican) 47.3%; ▌ Jasper N. Hughes (Populist) 0.5%
Indiana 5	George W. Faris	Republican	1894	Incumbent re-elected.	▌ ✓ George W. Faris (Republican) 49.4%; ▌ Samuel R. Hamil (Democratic) 48.8%; ▌ William E. Carpenter (Prohibition) 1.4%; ▌ A. J. Farrow (Populist) 0.4%
Indiana 6	Henry U. Johnson	Republican	1890	Incumbent retired. Republican hold.	▌ ✓ James E. Watson (Republican) 52.6%; ▌ Charles A. Robinson (Democratic) 47.1%; ▌ Samuel Walker (Populist) 0.3%
Indiana 7	Jesse Overstreet	Republican	1894	Incumbent re-elected.	▌ ✓ Jesse Overstreet (Republican) 51.8%; ▌ Leon O. Bailey (Democratic) 46.6%; ▌ William B. Campbell (Prohibition) 1.1%; ▌ Henry U. Kuerst (Socialist Labor) 0.5%
Indiana 8	Charles L. Henry	Republican	1894	Incumbent retired. Republican hold.	▌ ✓ George W. Cromer (Republican) 50.1%; ▌ Orlando J. Lotz (Democratic) 47.4%; ▌ George M. Martin (Prohibition) 1.8%; ▌ James A. Thompson (Populist) 0.7%
Indiana 9	Charles B. Landis	Republican	1896	Incumbent re-elected.	▌ ✓ Charles B. Landis (Republican) 50.2%; ▌ Joseph B. Cheadle (Democratic) 47.7%; ▌ Frank H. King (Prohibition) 1.4%; ▌ George M. Thompson (Populist) 0.7%
Indiana 10	Edgar D. Crumpacker	Republican	1896	Incumbent re-elected.	▌ ✓ Edgar D. Crumpacker (Republican) 55.0%; ▌ John Ross (Democratic) 45.0%
Indiana 11	George Washington Steele	Republican	1894	Incumbent re-elected.	▌ ✓ George Washington Steele (Republican) 53.0%; ▌ George W. Michael (Democratic) 44.1%; ▌ David A. McDowell (Prohibition) 2.3%; ▌ E. L. Wilson (Populist) 0.6%
Indiana 12	James M. Robinson	Democratic	1896	Incumbent re-elected.	▌ ✓ James M. Robinson (Democratic) 51.3%; ▌ Christian B. Stevens (Republican) 47.5%; ▌ Henry C. Schrader (Prohibition) 1.2%
Indiana 13	Lemuel W. Royse	Republican	1894	Incumbent lost renomination. Republican hold.	▌ ✓ Abraham L. Brick (Republican) 51.4%; ▌ Medary M. Hathaway (Democratic) 46.0%; ▌ Thomas E. Webb (Prohibition) 2.1%; ▌ J. L. Komer (Populist) 0.5%

== Iowa ==
District	Incumbent			This race	
District	Member	Party	First elected	Results	Candidates
Iowa 1	Samuel M. Clark	Republican	1894	Incumbent retired. Republican hold.	▌ ✓ Thomas Hedge (Republican) 54.3%; ▌ D. J. O'Connell (Democratic) 44.4%; ▌ J. W. Glasgow (Prohibition) 1.3%
Iowa 2	George M. Curtis	Republican	1894	Incumbent retired. Republican hold.	▌ ✓ Joseph R. Lane (Republican) 50.6%; ▌ John J. Ney (Democratic) 47.1%; ▌ J. B. Welzenbach (Socialist Labor) 1.1%; ▌ Eli Elliott (Prohibition) 0.7%; ▌ Allan W. Ricker (Populist) 0.5%
Iowa 3	David B. Henderson	Republican	1882	Incumbent re-elected.	▌ ✓ David B. Henderson (Republican) 59.1%; ▌ John H. Howell (Democratic) 40.7%; ▌ E. J. Dean (Populist) 0.2%
Iowa 4	Thomas Updegraff	Republican	1892	Incumbent lost renomination. Republican hold.	▌ ✓ Gilbert N. Haugen (Republican) 59.8%; ▌ T. T. Blaise (Democratic) 38.6%; ▌ P. Wooding (Prohibition) 1.3%; ▌ [FNU] Tracy (Populist) 0.3%
Iowa 5	Robert G. Cousins	Republican	1892	Incumbent re-elected.	▌ ✓ Robert G. Cousins (Republican) 55.9%; ▌ L. J. Rowell (Democratic) 41.9%; ▌ J. G. Van Ness (Prohibition) 1.9%; ▌ J. W. Whitmer (Populist) 0.3%
Iowa 6	John F. Lacey	Republican	1892	Incumbent re-elected.	▌ ✓ John F. Lacey (Republican) 50.9%; ▌ James B. Weaver (Democratic/Populist) 47.1%; ▌ Robert L. Turner (Prohibition) 1.3%; ▌ L. M. Morris (Middle of the Road Populist) 0.7%
Iowa 7	John A. T. Hull	Republican	1890	Incumbent re-elected.	▌ ✓ John A. T. Hull (Republican) 59.3%; ▌ Charles O. Holly (Democratic) 36.5%; ▌ T. G. Orwig (Prohibition) 2.7%; ▌ C. M. Iams (Populist) 1.5%
Iowa 8	William P. Hepburn	Republican	1892	Incumbent re-elected.	▌ ✓ William P. Hepburn (Republican) 53.1%; ▌ George L. Finn (Democratic/Populist) 44.0%; ▌ C. L. Parsons (Prohibition) 1.9%; ▌ D. C. Cowles (Middle of the Road Populist) 1.0%
Iowa 9	Alva L. Hager	Republican	1892	Incumbent lost renomination. Republican hold.	▌ ✓ Smith McPherson (Republican) 54.8%; ▌ James A. Lyon (Democratic) 43.6%; ▌ S. M. Blackman (Prohibition) 0.9%; ▌ Luke McDowell (Populist) 0.7%
Iowa 10	Jonathan P. Dolliver	Republican	1888	Incumbent re-elected.	▌ ✓ Jonathan P. Dolliver (Republican) 57.6%; ▌ Edwin Anderson (Democratic) 40.7%; ▌ P. J. Shaw (Prohibition) 1.4%; ▌ A. Novelius (Populist) 0.3%
Iowa 11	George D. Perkins	Republican	1890	Incumbent lost renomination. Republican hold.	▌ ✓ Lot Thomas (Republican) 56.6%; ▌ Arthur Samuel Garretson (Democratic) 40.7%; ▌ J. M. Hoffman (Prohibition) 1.8%; ▌ J. O. McElroy (Populist) 0.9%

== Kansas ==
District	Incumbent			This race	
District	Member	Party	First elected	Results	Candidates
Kansas 1	Charles Curtis; Redistricted from the 4th district	Republican	1892	Incumbent re-elected.	▌ ✓ Charles Curtis (Republican) 59.6%; ▌ W. W. Price (Democratic/Populist) 40.4%
Kansas 1	Case Broderick	Republican	1890	Incumbent lost renomination. Republican loss.	▌ ✓ Charles Curtis (Republican) 59.6%; ▌ W. W. Price (Democratic/Populist) 40.4%
Kansas 2	Mason S. Peters	Populist	1896	Incumbent lost re-election. Republican gain	▌ ✓ Justin De Witt Bowersock (Republican) 52.5%; ▌ Mason S. Peters (Democratic/Populist) 47.5%
Kansas 3	Edwin R. Ridgely	Populist	1896	Incumbent re-elected.	▌ ✓ Edwin R. Ridgely (Democratic/Populist) 51.4%; ▌ S. S. Kirkpatrick (Republican) 48.6%
Kansas 4	None (New district)			New district. Republican gain.	▌ ✓ James Monroe Miller (Republican) 53.9%; ▌ Henderson S. Martin (Democratic/Populist) 46.2%
Kansas 5	William D. Vincent	Populist	1896	Incumbent lost re-election. Republican gain	▌ ✓ William A. Calderhead (Republican) 53.5%; ▌ William D. Vincent (Democratic/Populist) 46.5%
Kansas 6	Nelson B. McCormick	Populist	1896	Incumbent lost re-election. Republican gain	▌ ✓ William A. Reeder (Republican) 49.7%; ▌ Nelson B. McCormick (Populist) 43.5%; ▌ William G. Hoffer (Democratic) 6.9%
Kansas 7	Jerry Simpson	Populist	1896	Incumbent lost re-election. Republican gain	▌ ✓ Chester I. Long (Republican) 51.7%; ▌ Jerry Simpson (Democratic/Populist) 48.3%
Kansas at-large	Jeremiah D. Botkin	Populist	1896	Incumbent lost re-election. Republican gain	▌ ✓ Charles Frederick Scott (Republican) 52.5%; ▌ Jeremiah D. Botkin (Democratic/Populist) 46.5%; ▌ Mont. Williams (Prohibition) 0.7%; ▌ F. E. Miller (Social Democratic) 0.3%

== Kentucky ==
District	Incumbent			This race	
District	Member	Party	First elected	Results	Candidates
Kentucky 1	Charles K. Wheeler	Democratic	1896	Incumbent re-elected.	▌ ✓ Charles K. Wheeler (Democratic) 67.7%; ▌ G. W. Reeves (Republican/Populist) 32.2%
Kentucky 2	John D. Clardy	Democratic	1894	Incumbent retired. Democratic hold.	▌ ✓ Henry D. Allen (Democratic) 57.3%; ▌ W. T. Fowler (Republican) 28.6%; ▌ George W. Jolly (Independent Republican) 10.5%; ▌ Samuel James (Populist) 3.6%
Kentucky 3	John S. Rhea	Democratic	1896	Incumbent re-elected.	▌ ✓ John S. Rhea (Democratic) 54.9%; ▌ M. P. Creel (Republican) 43.7%; ▌ J. S. Dorsey (Populist) 1.4%
Kentucky 4	David Highbaugh Smith	Democratic	1896	Incumbent re-elected.	▌ ✓ David Highbaugh Smith (Democratic) 55.3%; ▌ Charles J. Blandford (Republican) 42.5%; ▌ R. H. Mullen (Populist) 2.2%
Kentucky 5	Walter Evans	Republican	1894	Incumbent lost re-election. Democratic gain.	▌ ✓ Oscar Turner (Democratic) 49.6%; ▌ Walter Evans (Republican) 47.7%; ▌ J. H. Hambrick (Independent Republican) 1.4%; ▌ A. Schmutz (Socialist Labor) 1.3%
Kentucky 6	Albert S. Berry	Democratic	1892	Incumbent re-elected.	▌ ✓ Albert S. Berry (Democratic) 59.4%; ▌ J. M. Donaldson (Republican) 40.6%
Kentucky 7	Evan E. Settle	Democratic	1896	Incumbent re-elected.	▌ ✓ Evan E. Settle (Democratic) 67.7%; ▌ T. J. Hardin (Republican) 32.3%
Kentucky 8	George M. Davison	Republican	1896	Incumbent lost re-election. Democratic gain.	▌ ✓ George G. Gilbert (Democratic) 50.8%; ▌ George M. Davison (Republican) 47.5%; ▌ W. H. Ziegler (Independent) 1.7%
Kentucky 9	Samuel J. Pugh	Republican	1894	Incumbent re-elected.	▌ ✓ Samuel J. Pugh (Republican) 50.0%; ▌ Mordecai Williams (Democratic) 50.0%
Kentucky 10	Thomas Y. Fitzpatrick	Democratic	1896	Incumbent re-elected.	▌ ✓ Thomas Y. Fitzpatrick (Democratic) 54.1%; ▌ W. J. Seitz (Republican) 45.9%
Kentucky 11	David G. Colson	Republican	1894	Incumbent retired. Republican hold.	▌ ✓ Vincent Boreing (Republican) 51.5%; ▌ J. D. White (Independent Republican) 37.2%; ▌ H. H. Tye (Democratic) 10.9%; ▌ A. J. Bowman (Populist) 0.4%

== Louisiana ==
District	Incumbent			This race	
District	Member	Party	First elected	Results	Candidates
Louisiana 1	Adolph Meyer	Democratic	1890	Incumbent re-elected.	▌ ✓ Adolph Meyer (Democratic) 85.8%; ▌ C. W. Keeting (Republican) 14.2%
Louisiana 2	Robert C. Davey	Democratic	1896	Incumbent re-elected.	▌ ✓ Robert C. Davey (Democratic) 86.6%; ▌ Frank N. Wicker (Republican) 13.4%
Louisiana 3	Robert F. Broussard	Democratic	1896	Incumbent re-elected.	▌ ✓ Robert F. Broussard (Democratic) 84.9%; ▌ Charles Fontelleu (Republican) 15.1%
Louisiana 4	Henry Warren Ogden	Democratic	1894	Incumbent retired. Democratic hold.	▌ ✓ Phanor Breazeale (Democratic) 75.3%; ▌ Hardy Brian (Populist) 24.6%
Louisiana 5	Samuel T. Baird	Democratic	1896	Incumbent re-elected.	▌ ✓ Samuel T. Baird (Democratic) 74.0%; ▌ J. G. Taliaferro (Republican) 22.8%
Louisiana 6	Samuel M. Robertson	Democratic	1887	Incumbent re-elected.	▌ ✓ Samuel M. Robertson (Democratic) 99.6%

== Maine ==
District	Incumbent			This race	
District	Member	Party	First elected	Results	Candidates
Maine 1	Thomas Brackett Reed	Republican	1876	Incumbent re-elected.	▌ ✓ Thomas Brackett Reed (Republican) 59.8%; ▌ Luther F. McKinney (Democratic) 37.2%; ▌ Daniel P. Parker (Prohibition) 2.8%
Maine 2	Nelson Dingley Jr.	Republican	1881	Incumbent re-elected	▌ ✓ Nelson Dingley Jr. (Republican) 63.7%; ▌ John Scott (Democratic) 34.2%; ▌ Asaph J. Wheeler (Prohibition) 1.7%
Maine 3	Edwin C. Burleigh	Republican	1897	Incumbent re-elected.	▌ ✓ Edwin C. Burleigh (Republican) 64.3%; ▌ F. W. Plaisted (Democratic) 33.2%; ▌ Oliver S. Pillsbury (Prohibition) 2.5%
Maine 4	Charles A. Boutelle	Republican	1882	Incumbent re-elected.	▌ ✓ Charles A. Boutelle (Republican) 66.5%; ▌ Andrew J. Chase (Democratic) 29.7%; ▌ George W. Park (Prohibition) 2.4%; ▌ W. D. Littlefield (Populist) 1.4%

== Maryland ==
District	Incumbent			This race	
District	Member	Party	First elected	Results	Candidates
Maryland 1	Isaac A. Barber	Republican	1896	Incumbent retired. Democratic gain.	▌ ✓ John Walter Smith (Democratic) 47.9%; ▌ W. F. Jackson (Republican) 45.3%; ▌ James Swann (Prohibition) 5.2%
Maryland 2	William Benjamin Baker	Republican	1894	Incumbent re-elected.	▌ ✓ William Benjamin Baker (Republican) 48.4%; ▌ Richard Tippett (Democratic) 47.5%; ▌ Harrie J. Hollingsworth (Prohibition) 4.1%
Maryland 3	William S. Booze	Republican	1896	Incumbent retired. Republican hold.	▌ ✓ Frank C. Wachter (Republican) 49.1%; ▌ J. Schwatka (Democratic) 48.8%; ▌ John F. Hicks (Prohibition) 2.0%; ▌ William Whipkey (Independent) 0.1%
Maryland 4	William W. McIntire	Republican	1896	Incumbent lost re-election. Democratic gain.	▌ ✓ James William Denny (Democratic) 48.8%; ▌ William W. McIntire (Republican) 47.1%; ▌ Thoms S. Creney (Prohibition) 3.2%; ▌ T. Meyer (Socialist Labor) 0.9%
Maryland 5	Sydney E. Mudd I	Republican	1896	Incumbent re-elected.	▌ ✓ Sydney E. Mudd I (Republican) 52.1%; ▌ J. S. Cummings (Democratic) 44.3%; ▌ John E. Wetherold (Prohibition) 2.7%; ▌ C. T. Parker (Independent Republican) 0.9%
Maryland 6	John McDonald	Republican	1896	Incumbent retired. Republican hold.	▌ ✓ George A. Pearre (Republican) 54.8%; ▌ Thomas A. Poffenberger (Democratic) 41.8%; ▌ J. T. Baker (Prohibition) 3.4%

== Massachusetts ==
District	Incumbent			This race	
District	Member	Party	First elected	Results	Candidates
Massachusetts 1	George P. Lawrence	Republican	1897 (special)	Incumbent re-elected.	▌ ✓ George P. Lawrence (Republican) 58.0%; ▌Charles P. Davis (Democratic) 35.5%; ▌Edward A. Buckland (Socialist Labor) 6.5%
Massachusetts 2	Frederick H. Gillett	Republican	1892	Incumbent re-elected.	▌ ✓ Frederick H. Gillett (Republican) 60.3%; ▌Robert E. Bisbee (Democratic) 36.5%; ▌George H. Wrenn (Socialist Labor) 3.2%
Massachusetts 3	Joseph H. Walker	Republican	1888	Incumbent lost re-election. Democratic gain.	▌ ✓ John R. Thayer (Democratic) 50.4%; ▌Joseph H. Walker (Republican) 49.6%
Massachusetts 4	George W. Weymouth	Republican	1896	Incumbent re-elected.	▌ ✓ George W. Weymouth (Republican) 62.9%; ▌L. Porter Morse (Democratic) 37.1%
Massachusetts 5	William S. Knox	Republican	1894	Incumbent re-elected.	▌ ✓ William S. Knox (Republican) 51.8%; ▌Joseph J. Flynn (Democratic) 48.2%
Massachusetts 6	William H. Moody	Republican	1895 (special)	Incumbent re-elected.	▌ ✓ William H. Moody (Republican) 64.5%; ▌E. Moody Boynton (Democratic) 28.9%; ▌Albert L. Gillen (Social Democratic) 6.6%
Massachusetts 7	William Emerson Barrett	Republican	1894	Incumbent retired. Republican hold.	▌ ✓ Ernest W. Roberts (Republican) 55.8%; ▌Walter L. Ramsdell (Democratic) 41.6%; ▌Joseph Malloney (Socialist Labor) 2.6%
Massachusetts 8	Samuel W. McCall	Republican	1892	Incumbent re-elected.	▌ ✓ Samuel W. McCall (Republican) 70.0%; ▌George A. Perkins (Democratic) 27.2%; ▌William E. Stacey (Socialist Labor) 2.8%
Massachusetts 9	John F. Fitzgerald	Democratic	1894	Incumbent re-elected.	▌ ✓ John F. Fitzgerald (Democratic) 48.7%; ▌Franz H. Krebs Jr. (Republican) 25.8%; ▌James A. Gallivan (Ind. Democratic) 23.6%; ▌Florentine K. Bradman (Citizens Republican) 1.9%
Massachusetts 10	Samuel J. Barrows	Republican	1896	Incumbent lost re-election. Democratic gain.	▌ ✓ Henry F. Naphen (Democratic) 55.2%; ▌Samuel J. Barrows (Republican) 44.8%
Massachusetts 11	Charles F. Sprague	Republican	1892	Incumbent re-elected.	▌ ✓ Charles F. Sprague (Republican) 61.3%; ▌William H. Baker (Democratic) 38.6%
Massachusetts 12	William C. Lovering	Republican	1896	Incumbent re-elected.	▌ ✓ William C. Lovering (Republican) 65.9%; ▌Philip E. Brady (Democratic) 30.0%; ▌Jeremiah O'Fihelly (Socialist Labor) 4.1%
Massachusetts 13	William S. Greene	Republican	1898 (special)	Incumbent re-elected.	▌ ✓ William S. Greene (Republican) 68.65%; ▌Charles T. Luce (Democratic) 24.82%; ▌Thomas Stevenson (Socialist Labor) 6.51%; Others 0.01%

== Michigan ==
District	Incumbent			This race	
District	Member	Party	First elected	Results	Candidates
Michigan 1	John Blaisdell Corliss	Republican	1894	Incumbent re-elected.	▌ ✓ John Blaisdell Corliss (Republican) 51.2%; ▌ James H. Pound (Democratic) 47.3%; ▌ Charles Erb (Prohibition) 1.4%
Michigan 2	George Spalding	Republican	1894	Incumbent lost renomination. Republican hold.	▌ ✓ Henry C. Smith (Republican) 51.2%; ▌ Orrin R. Pierce (Democratic) 46.7%; ▌ Porter Biel (Prohibition) 1.8%; ▌ Byron E. Niles (Populist) 0.3%
Michigan 3	Albert M. Todd	Democratic	1896	Incumbent lost re-election. Republican gain.	▌ ✓ Washington Gardner (Republican) 51.6%; ▌ Albert M. Todd (Democratic) 48.4%
Michigan 4	Edward L. Hamilton	Republican	1896	Incumbent re-elected.	▌ ✓ Edward L. Hamilton (Republican) 54.8%; ▌ Roman I. Jarvis (Democratic) 43.2%; ▌ George F. Cummings (Prohibition) 1.2%; ▌ John K. Cunningham (Populist) 0.8%
Michigan 5	William Alden Smith	Republican	1894	Incumbent re-elected.	▌ ✓ William Alden Smith (Republican) 56.8%; ▌ George R. Perry (Democratic) 41.4%; ▌ Charles Oldfield (Prohibition) 1.5%; ▌ Thomas J. Haynes (Populist) 0.3%
Michigan 6	Samuel W. Smith	Republican	1896	Incumbent re-elected.	▌ ✓ Samuel W. Smith (Republican) 55.8%; ▌ Charles Fishbeck (Democratic) 41.7%; ▌ Myron Voorhies (Prohibition) 2.2%; ▌ James M. Houghton (Populist) 0.3%
Michigan 7	Horace G. Snover	Republican	1894	Incumbent retired. Republican hold.	▌ ✓ Edgar Weeks (Republican) 58.6%; ▌ Fred E. Burton (Democratic) 40.5%; ▌ James Henderson (Populist) 0.9%
Michigan 8	Ferdinand Brucker	Democratic	1896	Incumbent lost re-election. Republican gain.	▌ ✓ Joseph W. Fordney (Republican) 52.7%; ▌ Ferdinand Brucker (Democratic) 47.3%
Michigan 9	Roswell P. Bishop	Republican	1894	Incumbent re-elected.	▌ ✓ Roswell P. Bishop (Republican) 61.3%; ▌ Chauncey J. Chaddock (Democratic) 36.3%; ▌ George M. Sprout (Prohibition) 2.0%; ▌ Norman B. Farnsworth (Populist) 0.4%
Michigan 10	Rousseau O. Crump	Republican	1894	Incumbent re-elected.	▌ ✓ Rousseau O. Crump (Republican) 55.3%; ▌ Robert J. Kelly (Democratic) 44.4%; ▌ James J. Miller (Prohibition) 0.3%
Michigan 11	William S. Mesick	Republican	1896	Incumbent re-elected.	▌ ✓ William S. Mesick (Republican) 59.9%; ▌ Alva W. Nichols (Democratic) 38.1%; ▌ Harvey M. Lowell (Prohibition) 2.0%
Michigan 12	Carlos D. Shelden	Republican	1896	Incumbent re-elected.	▌ ✓ Carlos D. Shelden (Republican) 66.9%; ▌ Solomon S. Curry (Democratic) 30.0%; ▌ Harvey B. Hatch (Prohibition) 2.8%; ▌ E. D. Cox (Populist) 0.3%

== Minnesota ==
District	Incumbent			This race	
District	Member	Party	First elected	Results	Candidates
Minnesota 1	James A. Tawney	Republican	1892	Incumbent re-elected.	▌ ✓ James A. Tawney (Republican) 59.2%; ▌Milo White (Democratic/Populist) 37.3%; ▌Clarence Wedge (Prohibition) 3.4%
Minnesota 2	James McCleary	Republican	1892	Incumbent re-elected.	▌ ✓ James McCleary (Republican) 57.0%; ▌David H. Evans (Democratic/Populist) 39.6%; ▌Thadeus Grout (Prohibition) 3.4%
Minnesota 3	Joel Heatwole	Republican	1894	Incumbent re-elected.	▌ ✓ Joel Heatwole (Republican) 56.8%; ▌Charles Hinds (Democratic) 38.9%; ▌John R. Lowe (Prohibition) 4.3%
Minnesota 4	Frederick Stevens	Republican	1896	Incumbent re-elected.	▌ ✓ Frederick Stevens (Republican) 54.1%; ▌John W. Willis (Democratic) 39.3%; ▌Henry Carling (Socialist Labor) 2.6%; ▌N. S. Beardsley (Ind. Populist) 2.4%; ▌Newton Bray (Prohibition) 1.6%
Minnesota 5	Loren Fletcher	Republican	1892	Incumbent re-elected.	▌ ✓ Loren Fletcher (Republican) 55.4%; ▌Thomas J. Caton (Democratic/Populist) 38.1%; ▌Adolph Hirschfield (Socialist Labor) 2.7%; ▌Charles M. Way (Prohibition) 2.6%; ▌Edward Blackburn (Independent) 1.2%
Minnesota 6	Page Morris	Republican	1896	Incumbent re-elected.	▌ ✓ Page Morris (Republican) 50.1%; ▌Charles A. Towne (Democratic/Populist) 49.0%; ▌Edward Kriz (Socialist Labor) 0.9%
Minnesota 7	Frank Eddy	Republican	1894	Incumbent re-elected.	▌ ✓ Frank Eddy (Republican) 52.6%; ▌Peter M. Ringdal (Democratic/Populist) 43.1%; ▌Engebret E. Lobeck (Prohibition) 4.4%

== Mississippi ==
District	Incumbent			This race	
District	Member	Party	First elected	Results	Candidates
Mississippi 1	John M. Allen	Democratic	1884	Incumbent re-elected.	▌ ✓ John M. Allen (Democratic) 100%
Mississippi 2	Thomas Spight	Democratic	1898 (special)	Incumbent re-elected.	▌ ✓ Thomas Spight (Democratic) 92.91%; ▌C. M. Haynie (Populist) 5.26%; ▌S. M. Howry (Republican) 1.83%
Mississippi 3	Thomas C. Catchings	Democratic	1884	Incumbent re-elected.	▌ ✓ Thomas C. Catchings (Democratic) 85.07%; ▌Cornelius J. Jones (Colored Republican) 14.93%
Mississippi 4	Andrew F. Fox	Democratic	1896	Incumbent re-elected.	▌ ✓ Andrew F. Fox (Democratic) 77.08%; ▌Ralph Brewer (Populist) 22.92%
Mississippi 5	John S. Williams	Democratic	1892	Incumbent re-elected.	▌ ✓ John S. Williams (Democratic) 97.02%; ▌S. R. Pitts (Republican) 2.79%; ▌J. E. Everett (Independent) 0.20%
Mississippi 6	William F. Love	Democratic	1896	Incumbent died. Winner also elected to finish term. Democratic hold.	▌ ✓ Frank A. McLain (Democratic) 53.78%; ▌M. M. Evans (Ind. Democratic) 22.82%; ▌A. C. Hathorn (Populist) 16.39%; ▌H. C. Turley (Republican) 7.01%
Mississippi 7	Patrick Henry	Democratic	1896	Incumbent re-elected.	▌ ✓ Patrick Henry (Democratic) 90.95%; ▌T. B. Yellowley (Republican) 4.75%; ▌E. F. Brennan (Republican) 4.30%

== Missouri ==
District	Incumbent			This race	
District	Member	Party	First elected	Results	Candidates
Missouri 1	James T. Lloyd	Democratic	1897	Incumbent re-elected.	▌ ✓ James T. Lloyd (Democratic) 55.3%; ▌ Alfred N. Seaber (Republican) 42.6%; ▌ John M. Landon (Populist) 2.1%
Missouri 2	Robert N. Bodine	Democratic	1896	Incumbent lost renomination. Democratic hold.	▌ ✓ William W. Rucker (Democratic) 56.3%; ▌ William C. Irwin (Republican) 42.4%; ▌ Hugh Tudor (Populist) 1.3%
Missouri 3	Alexander M. Dockery	Democratic	1882	Incumbent retired to run for governor. Democratic hold.	▌ ✓ John Dougherty (Democratic) 53.1%; ▌ James E. Goodrich (Republican) 44.6%; ▌ Ulysses A. Towns (Populist) 2.3%
Missouri 4	Charles F. Cochran	Democratic	1896	Incumbent re-elected.	▌ ✓ Charles F. Cochran (Democratic) 52.9%; ▌ Arthur W. Brewster (Republican) 47.1%
Missouri 5	William S. Cowherd	Democratic	1896	Incumbent re-elected.	▌ ✓ William S. Cowherd (Democratic) 53.6%; ▌ John Welborn (Republican) 44.8%; ▌ George Wilson (Populist) 0.8%; ▌ William H. Stripe (Socialist Labor) 0.8%
Missouri 6	David A. De Armond	Democratic	1890	Incumbent re-elected.	▌ ✓ David A. De Armond (Democratic) 52.0%; ▌ Samuel W. Jurden (Republican) 42.4%; ▌ S. C. Brooks (Populist) 4.7%; ▌ J. E. Stevenson (Prohibition) 0.9%
Missouri 7	James Cooney	Democratic	1896	Incumbent re-elected.	▌ ✓ James Cooney (Democratic) 55.2%; ▌ William G. Robertson (Republican) 43.1%; ▌ D. T. Mitchell (Populist) 1.7%
Missouri 8	Richard P. Bland	Democratic	1896	Incumbent re-elected.	▌ ✓ Richard P. Bland (Democratic) 53.1%; ▌ John W. Vosholl (Republican) 46.2%; ▌ William R. Hale (Populist) 0.7%
Missouri 9	Champ Clark	Democratic	1896	Incumbent re-elected.	▌ ✓ Champ Clark (Democratic) 54.4%; ▌ Robert Shackleford (Republican) 45.0%; ▌ Hay Bell (Prohibition) 0.6%
Missouri 10	Richard Bartholdt	Republican	1892	Incumbent re-elected.	▌ ✓ Richard Bartholdt (Republican) 59.3%; ▌ Michael Joseph Gill (Democratic) 39.6%; ▌ C. E. Keefer (Social Democratic) 0.7%; ▌ J. J. Ernst (Socialist Labor) 0.4%
Missouri 11	Charles F. Joy	Republican	1894	Incumbent re-elected.	▌ ✓ Charles F. Joy (Republican) 52.3%; ▌ Edward A. Noonan (Democratic) 45.7%; ▌ J. H. Rabe (Independent) 1.2%; ▌ Charles F. Gebelein (Social Democratic) 0.4%; ▌ Peter Schweite (Socialist Labor) 0.4%
Missouri 12	Charles E. Pearce	Republican	1896	Incumbent re-elected.	▌ ✓ Charles E. Pearce (Republican) 52.6%; ▌ Robert H. Kern (Democratic) 44.7%; ▌ D. W. Scott (Colored Republican) 2.2%; ▌ L. P. Thompson (Social Democratic) 0.4%; ▌ L. C. Fry (Socialist Labor) 0.1%
Missouri 13	Edward Robb	Democratic	1896	Incumbent re-elected.	▌ ✓ Edward Robb (Democratic) 52.0%; ▌ John H. Reppy (Republican) 46.2%; ▌ Joseph B. Dines (Populist) 1.8%
Missouri 14	Willard Duncan Vandiver	Democratic	1896	Incumbent re-elected.	▌ ✓ Willard Duncan Vandiver (Democratic) 51.3%; ▌ George M. Miley (Republican) 43.9%; ▌ DeWitt Eskew (Populist) 4.8%
Missouri 15	Maecenas E. Benton	Democratic	1896	Incumbent re-elected.	▌ ✓ Maecenas E. Benton (Democratic) 54.3%; ▌ F. E. Williams (Republican) 45.5%

== Montana ==
District	Incumbent			This race	
District	Member	Party	First elected	Results	Candidates
Montana at-large	Charles S. Hartman	Silver Republican	1892	Incumbent retired. Democratic gain.	▌ ✓ Albert J. Campbell (Democratic) 46.90%; ▌Thomas C. Marshall (Republican) 29.79%; ▌Thomas S. Hogan (Silver Republican) 23.31%

== Nebraska ==
District	Incumbent			This race	
District	Member	Party	First elected	Results	Candidates
Nebraska 1	Jesse B. Strode	Republican	1894	Incumbent retired. Republican hold.	▌ ✓ Elmer Burkett (Republican) 53.88%; ▌James Manahan (Democratic/Populist) 45.96%; ▌Fred Herman (Unknown) 0.16%
Nebraska 2	David H. Mercer	Republican	1892	Incumbent re-elected.	▌ ✓ David H. Mercer (Republican) 52.02%; ▌Gilbert Hitchcock (Democratic/Populist) 47.98%
Nebraska 3	Samuel Maxwell	Populist	1896	Incumbent retired. Democratic gain.	▌ ✓ John S. Robinson (Democratic/Populist) 51.93%; ▌W. F. Norris (Republican) 48.07%
Nebraska 4	William L. Stark	Populist	1896	Incumbent re-elected.	▌ ✓ William L. Stark (Populist/Democratic) 50.71%; ▌Edmund H. Hinshaw (Republican) 49.29%
Nebraska 5	Roderick D. Sutherland	Populist	1896	Incumbent re-elected.	▌ ✓ Roderick D. Sutherland (Populist/Democratic) 51.36%; ▌Clarendon E. Adams (Republican) 48.64%
Nebraska 6	William L. Greene	Populist	1896	Incumbent re-elected.	▌ ✓ William L. Greene (Populist/Democratic) 53.50%; ▌Norris Brown (Republican) 46.51%

== Nevada ==
District	Incumbent			This race	
District	Member	Party	First elected	Results	Candidates
Nevada at-large	Francis G. Newlands	Silver	1892	Incumbent re-elected.	▌ ✓ Francis G. Newlands (Silver/Democratic) 65.0%; ▌ Thomas Wren (Populist) 35.1%

== New Hampshire ==
District	Incumbent			This race	
District	Member	Party	First elected	Results	Candidates
New Hampshire 1	Cyrus A. Sulloway	Republican	1894	Incumbent re-elected.	▌ ✓ Cyrus A. Sulloway (Republican) 52.2%; ▌ Edgar J. Knowlton (Democratic) 45.2%; ▌ Isaac B. Vail (Prohibition) 1.3%; ▌ L. Arnstein (Socialist Labor) 0.8%; ▌ C. H. Mellen (Social Democratic) 0.5%
New Hampshire 2	Frank G. Clarke	Republican	1896	Incumbent re-elected.	▌ ✓ Frank G. Clarke (Republican) 55.5%; ▌ Warren F. Daniell (Democratic) 42.8%; ▌ John C. Berry (Prohibition) 1.4%; ▌ Edward E. Southwick (Social Democratic) 0.2%; ▌ Elias M. Blodgett (Populist) 0.1%

== New Jersey ==
District	Incumbent			This race	
District	Member	Party	First elected	Results	Candidates
New Jersey 1	Henry C. Loudenslager	Republican	1892	Incumbent re-elected.	▌ ✓ Henry C. Loudenslager (Republican) 54.3%; ▌ Samuel Iredell (Democratic) 41.2%; ▌ George J. Haven (Prohibition) 4.2%; ▌ Frank F. Mills (Socialist Labor) 0.3%
New Jersey 2	John J. Gardner	Republican	1892	Incumbent re-elected.	▌ ✓ John J. Gardner (Republican) 56.1%; ▌ John F. Hall (Democratic) 40.5%; ▌ Joseph J. Currie (Prohibition) 3.0%; ▌ John P. Weigel (Socialist Labor) 0.4%
New Jersey 3	Benjamin F. Howell	Republican	1894	Incumbent re-elected.	▌ ✓ Benjamin F. Howell (Republican) 49.8%; ▌ Patrick Convery (Democratic) 48.0%; ▌ Orpheus B. Bird (Prohibition) 1.7%; ▌ F. Williams (Socialist Labor) 0.5%
New Jersey 4	Mahlon Pitney	Republican	1894	Incumbent retired on election to New Jersey State Senate. Democratic gain.	▌ ✓ Joshua S. Salmon (Democratic) 51.5%; ▌ John I. Blair Reilly (Republican) 43.8%; ▌ Franklin P. Lefferts (Prohibition) 4.5%; ▌ F. Campbell (Socialist Labor) 0.2%
New Jersey 5	James F. Stewart	Republican	1894	Incumbent re-elected.	▌ ✓ James F. Stewart (Republican) 50.6%; ▌ Francis J. Marley (Democratic) 45.0%; ▌ L. A. Magnet (Socialist Labor) 3.4%; ▌ Charles H. Stocking (Prohibition) 1.0%
New Jersey 6	Richard W. Parker	Republican	1894	Incumbent re-elected.	▌ ✓ Richard W. Parker (Republican) 52.5%; ▌ Henry G. Atwater (Democratic) 44.4%; ▌ Henry Carless (Socialist Labor) 2.2%; ▌ Daniel B. Raub (Prohibition) 0.9%
New Jersey 7	Thomas McEwan Jr.	Republican	1894	Incumbent retired. Democratic gain.	▌ ✓ William D. Daly (Democratic) 57.8%; ▌ Zebina K. Pangborn (Republican) 38.5%; ▌ G. P. Herrasaft (Socialist Labor) 3.2%; ▌ Joel W. Brown (Prohibition) 0.5%
New Jersey 8	Charles N. Fowler	Republican	1894	Incumbent re-elected.	▌ ✓ Charles N. Fowler (Republican) 54.1%; ▌ Edward H. Snyder (Democratic) 42.4%; ▌ W. J. Campbell (Socialist Labor) 2.0%; ▌ Joseph C. Davis (Prohibition) 1.5%

== New York ==
District	Incumbent			This race	
District	Member	Party	First elected	Results	Candidates
New York 1	Joseph M. Belford	Republican	1896	Incumbent lost re-election. Democratic gain.	▌ ✓ Townsend Scudder (Democratic) 49.8%; ▌ Joseph M. Belford (Republican) 48.9%; ▌ Henry M. Randall (Prohibition) 1.2%; ▌ Charles W. McCullough (Socialist Labor) 0.1%
New York 2	Denis M. Hurley	Republican	1894	Incumbent lost re-election and died before next term. Democratic gain.	▌ ✓ John J. Fitzgerald (Democratic) 55.6%; ▌ Denis M. Hurley (Republican) 43.2%; ▌ Peter Lassen (Socialist Labor) 0.7%; ▌ William W. Passage (Prohibition) 0.3%; ▌ Thomas W. Scanlon (Gold Democratic) 0.2%
New York 3	Edmund H. Driggs	Democratic	1897	Incumbent re-elected.	▌ ✓ Edmund H. Driggs (Democratic) 50.7%; ▌ William A. Prendergast (Republican) 48.0%; ▌ Joel Gnass (Socialist Labor) 1.0%; ▌ Asa F. Smith (Prohibition) 0.3%
New York 4	Israel F. Fischer	Republican	1894	Incumbent lost re-election. Democratic gain.	▌ ✓ Bertram T. Clayton (Democratic) 52.8%; ▌ Israel F. Fischer (Republican) 44.9%; ▌ Joseph B. Cooper (Socialist Labor) 1.9%; ▌ Benjamin Larzelere (Prohibition) 0.3%; ▌ Henry F. Goulden (Gold Democratic) 0.1%
New York 5	Charles G. Bennett	Republican	1894	Incumbent lost re-election. Democratic gain.	▌ ✓ Frank E. Wilson (Democratic) 51.4%; ▌ Charles G. Bennett (Republican) 43.8%; ▌ Gustav A. Rosenblath (Socialist Labor) 4.5%; ▌ Horatio Berry (Prohibition) 0.2%; ▌ Edward J. Quinn (Gold Democratic) 0.1%
New York 6	James R. Howe	Republican	1894	Incumbent retired. Democratic gain.	▌ ✓ Mitchell May (Democratic) 55.4%; ▌ Henry C. Fischer (Republican) 40.6%; ▌ William Spooner (Socialist Labor) 3.4%; ▌ Isaac Carhart (Prohibition) 0.3%; ▌ Frederick W. Jobelman (Silver Democratic) 0.3%
New York 7	John H. G. Vehslage	Democratic	1896	Incumbent lost renomination. Democratic hold.	▌ ✓ Nicholas Muller (Democratic) 66.5%; ▌ C. Wilmot Townsend (Republican) 31.3%; ▌ Julius Loos (Socialist Labor) 1.5%; ▌ William P. F. Ferguson (Prohibition) 0.7%
New York 8	John M. Mitchell	Republican	1894	Incumbent lost re-election. Democratic gain.	▌ ✓ Daniel J. Riordan (Democratic) 58.6%; ▌ John M. Mitchell (Republican) 40.2%; ▌ John H. Nagel (Socialist Labor) 0.9%; ▌ M. W. Palmer (Prohibition) 0.2%; ▌ Elias Schwartz (Silver Democratic) 0.1%
New York 9	Thomas J. Bradley	Democratic	1896	Incumbent re-elected.	▌ ✓ Thomas J. Bradley (Democratic) 56.8%; ▌ John Stiebling (Republican) 31.3%; ▌ Lucien Sanial (Socialist Labor) 11.7%; ▌ George E. Mayer (Prohibition) 0.2%
New York 10	Amos J. Cummings	Democratic	1895	Incumbent re-elected.	▌ ✓ Amos J. Cummings (Democratic) 62.8%; ▌ Elijah M. Fisher (Republican) 35.4%; ▌ Thomas Ceely (Socialist Labor) 1.5%; ▌ George Gethin (Prohibition) 0.3%
New York 11	William Sulzer	Democratic	1894	Incumbent re-elected.	▌ ✓ William Sulzer (Democratic) 62.8%; ▌ William Volkel (Republican) 27.0%; ▌ Howard Balkam (Socialist Labor) 10.1%; ▌ George H. Mayer (Prohibition) 0.1%
New York 12	George B. McClellan Jr.	Democratic	1894	Incumbent re-elected.	▌ ✓ George B. McClellan Jr. (Democratic) 64.5%; ▌ Howard Conkling (Republican) 32.9%; ▌ Dow Hasman (Socialist Labor) 2.4%; ▌ Robert Kopp (Silver Democratic) 0.1%; ▌ Welcome E. Sheldon (Prohibition) 0.1%
New York 13	Richard C. Shannon	Republican	1894	Incumbent retired. Democratic gain.	▌ ✓ Jefferson Monroe Levy (Democratic) 59.8%; ▌ James W. Perry (Republican) 37.9%; ▌ John J. Flick (Socialist Labor) 2.1%; ▌ John McKee (Prohibition) 0.2%
New York 14	Lemuel E. Quigg	Republican	1894	Incumbent lost re-election. Democratic gain.	▌ ✓ William A. Chanler (Democratic) 54.3%; ▌ Lemuel E. Quigg (Republican) 43.3%; ▌ Emile Neppel (Socialist Labor) 2.2%; ▌ Albert Wadhams (Prohibition) 0.2%
New York 15	Philip B. Low	Republican	1894	Incumbent lost re-election. Democratic gain.	▌ ✓ Jacob Ruppert (Democratic) 57.8%; ▌ Philip B. Low (Republican) 38.5%; ▌ William Ehret (Socialist Labor) 3.6%; ▌ Jeremiah T. Brooks (Prohibition) 0.1%
New York 16	William L. Ward	Republican	1896	Incumbent retired. Democratic gain.	▌ ✓ John Q. Underhill (Democratic) 54.6%; ▌ J. Irving Burns (Republican) 43.8%; ▌ John J. Kinneally (Socialist Labor) 1.3%; ▌ Collin F. Jewell (Prohibition) 0.2%; ▌ William A. Cox (Silver Democratic) 0.1%
New York 17	Benjamin Odell	Republican	1894	Incumbent retired. Republican hold.	▌ ✓ Arthur S. Tompkins (Republican) 54.2%; ▌ Samuel D. Robertson (Democratic) 43.9%; ▌ Samuel P. Felter (Socialist Labor) 1.6%; ▌ James C. Rider (Prohibition) 0.3%
New York 18	John H. Ketcham	Republican	1896	Incumbent re-elected.	▌ ✓ John H. Ketcham (Republican) 55.1%; ▌ Thomas E. Benedict (Democratic) 43.4%; ▌ Lester Howard (Prohibition) 1.5%
New York 19	Aaron Van Schaick Cochrane	Republican	1896	Incumbent re-elected.	▌ ✓ Aaron Van Schaick Cochrane (Republican) 49.1%; ▌ John H. Livingston (Democratic) 49.1%; ▌ Adam Y. Myers (Prohibition) 1.3%; ▌ Lawrence A. Boland (Socialist Labor) 0.5%
New York 20	George N. Southwick	Republican	1894	Incumbent lost re-election. Democratic gain.	▌ ✓ Martin H. Glynn (Democratic) 50.1%; ▌ George N. Southwick (Republican) 48.7%; ▌ Jacob E. Alexander (Socialist Labor) 0.7%; ▌ Ovier H. Blodgett (Prohibition) 0.5%
New York 21	David F. Wilber	Republican	1894	Incumbent retired. Republican hold.	▌ ✓ John Knox Stewart (Republican) 50.9%; ▌ Stephen Malgham (Democratic) 46.5%; ▌ Smith C. Niles (Prohibition) 1.8%; ▌ Arthur A. Playford (Socialist Labor) 0.8%
New York 22	Lucius Littauer	Republican	1896	Incumbent re-elected.	▌ ✓ Lucius Littauer (Republican) 61.3%; ▌ Dennis B. Lucy (Democratic) 35.0%; ▌ Warren E. Whitney (Prohibition) 3.0%; ▌ Miles E. Wilcox (Socialist Labor) 0.7%
New York 23	Wallace T. Foote Jr.	Republican	1894	Incumbent retired. Republican hold.	▌ ✓ Louis W. Emerson (Republican) 96.3%; ▌ Jonathan E. Hoag (Prohibition) 3.7%
New York 24	Charles A. Chickering	Republican	1892	Incumbent re-elected.	▌ ✓ Charles A. Chickering (Republican) 58.9%; ▌ Eber T. Strickland (Democratic) 38.6%; ▌ Eugene M. Crabb (Prohibition) 2.5%
New York 25	James S. Sherman	Republican	1892	Incumbent re-elected.	▌ ✓ James S. Sherman (Republican) 52.8%; ▌ Walter Ballou (Democratic) 45.2%; ▌ T. Clinton Brickway (Prohibition) 2.0%
New York 26	George W. Ray	Republican	1890	Incumbent re-elected.	▌ ✓ George W. Ray (Republican) 58.6%; ▌ Edward E. Pease (Democratic) 37.5%; ▌ Isaac C. Andrews (Prohibition) 3.9%
New York 27	James J. Belden	Republican	1896	Incumbent retired. Republican hold.	▌ ✓ Michael E. Driscoll (Republican) 56.5%; ▌ George H. Gilbert (Democratic) 30.9%; ▌ Thomas Crimmins (Socialist Labor) 5.3%; ▌ John McCarthy (Silver Democratic) 5.3%; ▌ Charles M. Tower (Prohibition) 2.0%
New York 28	Sereno E. Payne	Republican	1889	Incumbent re-elected.	▌ ✓ Sereno E. Payne (Republican) 59.4%; ▌ John H. Young (Democratic) 37.9%; ▌ John W. Burns (Prohibition) 2.8%
New York 29	Charles W. Gillet	Republican	1892	Incumbent re-elected.	▌ ✓ Charles W. Gillet (Republican) 52.7%; ▌ Arthur L. Childs (Democratic) 43.2%; ▌ Casper G. Decker (Prohibition) 4.1%
New York 30	James W. Wadsworth	Republican	1890	Incumbent re-elected.	▌ ✓ James W. Wadsworth (Republican) 55.8%; ▌ James T. Gordon (Democratic) 40.9%; ▌ Alva Carpenter (Prohibition) 3.3%
New York 31	Henry C. Brewster	Republican	1894	Incumbent retired. Republican hold.	▌ ✓ James M. E. O'Grady (Republican) 51.8%; ▌ John R. Fanning (Democratic) 43.1%; ▌ Frank A. Sieverman (Socialist Labor) 2.8%; ▌ Benson H. Roberts (Prohibition) 2.3%
New York 32	Rowland B. Mahany	Republican	1894	Incumbent lost re-election. Democratic gain.	▌ ✓ William H. Ryan (Democratic) 49.5%; ▌ Rowland B. Mahany (Republican) 47.4%; ▌ August Miller (Socialist Labor) 2.7%; ▌ Stephen Lockwood (Prohibition) 0.4%
New York 33	De Alva S. Alexander	Republican	1896	Incumbent re-elected.	▌ ✓ De Alva S. Alexander (Republican) 55.8%; ▌ Harvey W. Richardson (Democratic) 41.9%; ▌ Boris Bornstein (Socialist Labor) 1.2%; ▌ Joseph W. Grosvenor (Prohibition) 1.1%
New York 34	Warren B. Hooker	Republican	1890	Incumbent re-elected.	▌ ✓ Warren B. Hooker (Republican) 62.8%; ▌ J. William Sanbury (Democratic) 33.2%; ▌ Andrew Y. Freeman (Prohibition) 4.0%

== North Carolina ==
District	Incumbent			This race	
District	Member	Party	First elected	Results	Candidates
North Carolina 1	Harry Skinner	Populist	1894	Incumbent lost re-election. Democratic gain.	▌ ✓ John H. Small (Democratic) 51.8%; ▌ Harry Skinner (Populist/Republican) 47.9%; ▌ Joshua L. Whidbee (Independent Republican) 0.3%
North Carolina 2	George Henry White	Republican	1896	Incumbent re-elected.	▌ ✓ George Henry White (Republican) 49.5%; ▌ William E. Fountain (Democratic) 42.1%; ▌ James B. Lloyd (Populist) 6.9%; ▌ B. F. Aycock (Independent Democratic) 1.5%
North Carolina 3	John Edgar Fowler	Populist	1896	Incumbent lost re-election. Democratic gain.	▌ ✓ Charles R. Thomas (Democratic) 50.3%; ▌ John Edgar Fowler (Populist/Republican) 49.7%
North Carolina 4	William F. Strowd	Populist	1894	Incumbent retired. Populist hold.	▌ ✓ John W. Atwater (Ind. Populist/Democratic) 51.1%; ▌ Joseph J. Jenkins (Populist/Republican) 48.9%
North Carolina 5	William Walton Kitchin	Democratic	1896	Incumbent re-elected.	▌ ✓ William Walton Kitchin (Democratic) 52.9%; ▌ Spencer B. Adams (Republican/Populist) 47.1%
North Carolina 6	Charles H. Martin	Populist	1894	Incumbent retired. Democratic gain.	▌ ✓ John D. Bellamy (Democratic) 57.2%; ▌ Oliver H. Dockery (Republican/Populist) 42.8%
North Carolina 7	Alonzo C. Shuford	Populist	1894	Incumbent lost renomination. Democratic gain.	▌ ✓ Theodore F. Kluttz (Democratic) 58.5%; ▌ Morrison H. Caldwell (Populist/Republican) 41.3%; ▌ Thomas P. Johnson (Prohibition) 0.2%
North Carolina 8	Romulus Z. Linney	Republican	1894	Incumbent re-elected.	▌ ✓ Romulus Z. Linney (Republican/Populist) 51.7%; ▌ Edward F. Lovell (Democratic) 47.9%; ▌ John M. Brower (Independent Republican) 0.4%
North Carolina 9	Richmond Pearson	Republican	1894	Incumbent lost re-election. Democratic gain.	▌ ✓ William T. Crawford (Democratic) 50.2%; ▌ Richmond Pearson (Republican) 49.6%; ▌ George E. Boggs (Populist) 0.2%
North Carolina 9	Richmond Pearson	Republican	1894	Election successfully contested. Incumbent re-elected and seated May 10, 1900.	▌ ✓ Richmond Pearson (Republican); ▌ William T. Crawford (Democratic); ▌ George E. Boggs (Populist)

== North Dakota ==
District	Incumbent			This race	
District	Member	Party	First elected	Results	Candidates
North Dakota at-large	Martin N. Johnson	Republican	1890	Incumbent retired to run for U.S. senator. Republican hold.	▌ ✓ Burleigh F. Spalding (Republican) 60.89%; ▌H. M. Creel (Fusion) 39.11%

== Ohio ==
District	Incumbent			This race	
District	Member	Party	First elected	Results	Candidates
Ohio 1	William B. Shattuc	Republican	1896	Incumbent re-elected.	▌ ✓ William B. Shattuc (Republican) 58.5%; ▌ John F. Follett (Democratic) 40.6%; ▌ Will T. Cressler (Union Reform) 0.9%
Ohio 2	Jacob H. Bromwell	Republican	1894	Incumbent re-elected.	▌ ✓ Jacob H. Bromwell (Republican) 58.0%; ▌ Charles L. Swain (Democratic) 41.3%; ▌ J. D. Stuckey (Union Reform) 0.7%
Ohio 3	John Lewis Brenner	Democratic	1896	Incumbent re-elected.	▌ ✓ John Lewis Brenner (Democratic) 50.1%; ▌ William J. White (Republican) 49.9%
Ohio 4	George Alexander Marshall	Democratic	1896	Incumbent retired. Democratic hold.	▌ ✓ Robert B. Gordon (Democratic) 57.7%; ▌ Philip Sheets (Republican) 39.3%; ▌ William H. Murphy (Union Reform) 3.0%
Ohio 5	David Meekison	Democratic	1896	Incumbent re-elected.	▌ ✓ David Meekison (Democratic) 54.1%; ▌ Alfred N. Wilcox (Republican) 43.9%; ▌ F. S. Dunakin (Union Reform) 2.0%
Ohio 6	Seth W. Brown	Republican	1896	Incumbent re-elected.	▌ ✓ Seth W. Brown (Republican) 54.0%; ▌ Lewis H. Whiteman (Democratic) 44.0%; ▌ Perry McLaughlin (Union Reform) 1.0%
Ohio 7	Walter L. Weaver	Republican	1896	Incumbent re-elected.	▌ ✓ Walter L. Weaver (Republican) 49.5%; ▌ John L. Zimmerman (Democratic) 48.4%; ▌ R. Rathbun (Union Reform) 2.1%
Ohio 8	Archibald Lybrand	Republican	1896	Incumbent re-elected.	▌ ✓ Archibald Lybrand (Republican) 51.6%; ▌ H. Walter Doty (Democratic) 45.8%; ▌ Spencer W. Garwood (Union Reform) 2.6%
Ohio 9	James H. Southard	Republican	1894	Incumbent re-elected.	▌ ✓ James H. Southard (Republican) 54.8%; ▌ Samuel E. Niece (Democratic) 45.2%; ▌ David Miley (Union Reform) 0.1%
Ohio 10	Lucien J. Fenton	Republican	1894	Incumbent lost renomination. Republican hold.	▌ ✓ Stephen Morgan (Republican) 58.4%; ▌ Alva Crabtree (Democratic) 41.6%
Ohio 11	Charles H. Grosvenor	Republican	1892	Incumbent re-elected.	▌ ✓ Charles H. Grosvenor (Republican) 54.6%; ▌ Charles E. Peoples (Democratic) 45.3%; ▌ G. W. Dillison (Union Reform) 0.1%
Ohio 12	John J. Lentz	Democratic	1896	Incumbent re-elected.	▌ ✓ John J. Lentz (Democratic) 50.2%; ▌ Edward N. Huggins (Republican) 48.6%; ▌ William W. Johnson (Prohibition) 0.7%; ▌ Alexander M. Smith (Union Reform) 0.5%
Ohio 13	James A. Norton	Democratic	1896	Incumbent re-elected.	▌ ✓ James A. Norton (Democratic) 54.1%; ▌ Henry L. Wenner (Republican) 44.5%; ▌ Orrin J. Fry (Union Reform) 1.3%; ▌ Walter S. Payne (Prohibition) 0.1%
Ohio 14	Winfield S. Kerr	Republican	1894	Incumbent re-elected.	▌ ✓ Winfield S. Kerr (Republican) 54.0%; ▌ Thomas A. Gruber (Democratic) 46.0%
Ohio 15	H. Clay Van Voorhis	Republican	1892	Incumbent re-elected.	▌ ✓ H. Clay Van Voorhis (Republican) 54.0%; ▌ Henry R. Stanbery (Democratic) 46.0%
Ohio 16	Lorenzo Danford	Republican	1894	Incumbent re-elected.	▌ ✓ Lorenzo Danford (Republican) 54.9%; ▌ Elliot D. Moore (Democratic) 45.1%
Ohio 17	John A. McDowell	Democratic	1896	Incumbent re-elected.	▌ ✓ John A. McDowell (Democratic) 55.5%; ▌ George E. Broome (Republican) 44.5%
Ohio 18	Robert Walker Tayler	Republican	1894	Incumbent re-elected.	▌ ✓ Robert Walker Tayler (Republican) 52.6%; ▌ Charles C. Weybrecht (Democratic) 45.5%; ▌ George C. Harvey (Prohibition) 1.4%; ▌ L. B. Logan (Union Reform) 0.5%
Ohio 19	Ezra B. Taylor	Republican	1880	Incumbent died. Winner also elected to finish term. Republican hold.	▌ ✓ Charles W. F. Dick (Republican) 64.9%; ▌ Isaac H. Phelps (Democratic) 35.1%; ▌ Warren Cook (Union Reform) 0.4%
Ohio 20	Clifton B. Beach	Republican	1894	Incumbent retired. Republican hold.	▌ ✓ Fremont O. Phillips (Republican) 56.5%; ▌ William J. Hart (Democratic) 40.1%; ▌ R. Barthels (Socialist Labor) 3.0%; ▌ M. O. Morton (Union Reform) 0.1%
Ohio 21	Theodore E. Burton	Republican	1894	Incumbent re-elected.	▌ ✓ Theodore E. Burton (Republican) 59.2%; ▌ Lemuel A. Russell (Democratic) 36.4%; ▌ J. J. Koler (Socialist Labor) 4.1%

== Oregon ==
District	Incumbent			This race	
District	Member	Party	First elected	Results	Candidates
Oregon 1	Thomas H. Tongue	Republican	1896	Incumbent re-elected.	▌ ✓ Thomas H. Tongue (Republican) 48.96%; ▌R. M. Veatch (Fusion) 44.28%; ▌J. L. Hill (Populist) 4.21%; ▌L. H. Pederson (Prohibition) 2.56%
Oregon 2	William R. Ellis	Republican	1892	Incumbent lost renomination. Republican hold.	▌ ✓ Malcolm A. Moody (Republican) 54.15%; ▌C. M. Donaldson (Fusion) 37.22%; ▌H. E. Courtney (Populist) 5.78%; ▌G. W. Ingalls (Prohibition) 2.85%

== Pennsylvania ==
District	Incumbent			This race	
District	Member	Party	First elected	Results	Candidates
Pennsylvania 1	Henry H. Bingham	Republican	1878	Incumbent re-elected.	▌ ✓ Henry H. Bingham (Republican) 72.1%; ▌ Michael Francis Doyle (Democratic) 23.1%; ▌ Joseph B. Holtz (Prohibition) 3.1%; ▌ James E. Lennon (Independent) 1.8%
Pennsylvania 2	Robert Adams Jr.	Republican	1893	Incumbent re-elected.	▌ ✓ Robert Adams Jr. (Republican) 83.5%; ▌ Herman V. Hetzel (Democratic) 16.5%
Pennsylvania 3	William McAleer	Democratic	1896	Incumbent re-elected.	▌ ✓ William McAleer (Democratic/Republican) 98.3%; ▌ Edward M. Marsh (Prohibition) 1.7%
Pennsylvania 4	James R. Young	Republican	1896	Incumbent re-elected.	▌ ✓ James R. Young (Republican) 72.7%; ▌ Gideon Sibley (Democratic) 21.4%; ▌ Clinton C. Hancock (Prohibition) 5.9%
Pennsylvania 5	Alfred C. Harmer	Republican	1876	Incumbent re-elected.	▌ ✓ Alfred C. Harmer (Republican) 79.8%; ▌ Frank D. Wright (Democratic) 20.2%
Pennsylvania 6	Thomas S. Butler	Independent Republican	1896	Incumbent re-elected as a Republican candidate. Republican gain.	▌ ✓ Thomas S. Butler (Republican) 53.6%; ▌ John B. Robinson (Honest Government) 23.5%; ▌ William H. Berry (Democratic) 23.0%
Pennsylvania 7	Irving P. Wanger	Republican	1892	Incumbent re-elected.	▌ ✓ Irving P. Wanger (Republican) 53.1%; ▌ Clinton Rorer (Democratic) 44.0%; ▌ Howard Leopold (Prohibition) 2.9%
Pennsylvania 8	William S. Kirkpatrick	Republican	1896	Incumbent lost re-election. Democratic gain.	▌ ✓ Laird Howard Barber (Democratic) 54.8%; ▌ William S. Kirkpatrick (Republican) 45.2%; ▌ Edward E. Dixon (Prohibition) 2.1%
Pennsylvania 9	Daniel Ermentrout	Democratic	1896	Incumbent re-elected.	▌ ✓ Daniel Ermentrout (Democratic) 57.3%; ▌ Jeremiah S. Parvin (Republican) 39.4%; ▌ Wesley W. Bowman (Prohibition) 2.2%; ▌ Isaac P. Merkel (Socialist Labor) 1.1%
Pennsylvania 10	Marriott Brosius	Republican	1888	Incumbent re-elected.	▌ ✓ Marriott Brosius (Republican) 67.9%; ▌ A. J. Steinman (Democratic) 27.5%; ▌ William L. Jackson (Prohibition) 4.7%
Pennsylvania 11	William Connell	Republican	1896	Incumbent re-elected.	▌ ✓ William Connell (Republican) 46.1%; ▌ Michael F. Sando (Democratic) 39.8%; ▌ Freeman Leach (Prohibition/Honest Government) 12.8%; ▌ John Burschel (Socialist Labor) 1.3%
Pennsylvania 12	Morgan B. Williams	Republican	1896	Incumbent lost re-election. Democratic gain.	▌ ✓ Stanley W. Davenport (Democratic) 49.9%; ▌ Morgan B. Williams (Republican) 45.7%; ▌ James D. Hunter (Prohibition) 4.3%
Pennsylvania 13	Charles N. Brumm	Republican	1894	Incumbent lost re-election. Democratic gain.	▌ ✓ James W. Ryan (Democratic) 54.2%; ▌ Charles N. Brumm (Republican) 45.2%; ▌ Pierce Walker (Socialist Labor) 0.6%
Pennsylvania 14	Marlin E. Olmsted	Republican	1896	Incumbent re-elected.	▌ ✓ Marlin E. Olmsted (Republican) 60.8%; ▌ Wilson W. Gray (Democratic) 31.2%; ▌ Lee L. Grumbine (Prohibition) 8.1%
Pennsylvania 15	James H. Codding	Republican	1895	Incumbent retired. Republican hold.	▌ ✓ Charles Frederick Wright (Republican) 55.3%; ▌ Archibald B. Gammell (Democratic) 35.5%; ▌ Chauncey S. Russell (Prohibition) 9.2%
Pennsylvania 16	Horace B. Packer	Republican	1896	Incumbent re-elected.	▌ ✓ Horace B. Packer (Republican) 49.4%; ▌ Jonathan F. Strieby (Democratic) 40.1%; ▌ Lewis P. Thurston (Prohibition) 10.5%
Pennsylvania 17	Monroe H. Kulp	Republican	1894	Incumbent retired. Democratic gain.	▌ ✓ Rufus K. Polk (Democratic) 51.8%; ▌ William H. Woodin (Republican) 43.8%; ▌ John M. Caldwell (Prohibition) 4.4%
Pennsylvania 18	Thaddeus M. Mahon	Republican	1892	Incumbent re-elected.	▌ ✓ Thaddeus M. Mahon (Republican) 57.8%; ▌ Robert McMeen (Democratic) 42.2%
Pennsylvania 19	George J. Benner	Democratic	1896	Incumbent retired. Democratic hold.	▌ ✓ Edward D. Ziegler (Democratic) 51.4%; ▌ Robert Jacob Lewis (Republican) 48.6%; ▌ A. Foster Mullin (Prohibition) 1.6%
Pennsylvania 20	Josiah D. Hicks	Republican	1892	Incumbent retired. Republican hold.	▌ ✓ Joseph E. Thropp (Republican) 48.9%; ▌ James M. Walters (Democratic) 45.2%; ▌ John J. Irwin (Prohibition) 5.3%; ▌ John McMahon (Socialist Labor) 0.6%
Pennsylvania 21	Edward E. Robbins	Republican	1896	Incumbent retired. Republican hold.	▌ ✓ Summers M. Jack (Republican) 55.7%; ▌ Jacob R. Spiegel (Democratic) 38.7%; ▌ Thomas J. Baldridge (Prohibition) 5.6%
Pennsylvania 22	John Dalzell	Republican	1886	Incumbent re-elected.	▌ ✓ John Dalzell (Republican) 66.6%; ▌ George W. Acklin (Democratic) 28.6%; ▌ Homer L. Castle (Prohibition) 3.2%; ▌ Valentine Remmel (Socialist Labor) 1.4%; ▌ Thomas Grundy (Union) 0.3%
Pennsylvania 23	William A. Stone	Republican	1890	Incumbent resigned to become governor of Pennsylvania. Winner also elected to finish term. Republican hold.	▌ ✓ William H. Graham (Republican) 68.1%; ▌ John H. Stevenson (Democratic) 27.3%; ▌ Fred C. Brittain (Prohibition) 3.4%; ▌ Enos Schwartz (Socialist Labor) 1.1%; ▌ William A. Klinger (Union) 0.2%
Pennsylvania 24	Ernest F. Acheson	Republican	1894	Incumbent re-elected.	▌ ✓ Ernest F. Acheson (Republican) 54.5%; ▌ Mark M. Cochran (Democratic) 45.5%
Pennsylvania 25	Joseph B. Showalter	Republican	1897	Incumbent re-elected.	▌ ✓ Joseph B. Showalter (Republican) 51.3%; ▌ Marcus L. Lockwood (Democratic) 43.0%; ▌ John A. Bailey (Prohibition) 5.7%
Pennsylvania 26	John C. Sturtevant	Republican	1896	Incumbent retired. Democratic gain.	▌ ✓ Athelston Gaston (Democratic) 47.8%; ▌ George H. Higgins (Republican) 47.6%; ▌ Francis A. Loveland (Prohibition) 4.6%
Pennsylvania 27	Charles W. Stone	Republican	1890	Incumbent lost re-election. Democratic gain.	▌ ✓ Joseph C. Sibley (Democratic) 52.1%; ▌ Charles W. Stone (Republican) 43.3%; ▌ William H. Hague (Prohibition) 4.6%
Pennsylvania 28	William C. Arnold	Republican	1894	Incumbent lost re-election. Democratic gain.	▌ ✓ James Knox Polk Hall (Democratic) 52.1%; ▌ William C. Arnold (Republican) 42.2%; ▌ George W. Rheem (Prohibition) 5.6%
Pennsylvania at-large 2 seats on a general ticket.	Galusha A. Grow	Republican	1894	Incumbent re-elected.	▌ ✓ Galusha A. Grow (Republican) 28.5%; ▌ ✓ Samuel A. Davenport (Republican) 27.8%; ▌ Jerry N. Weiler (Democratic/Populist) 19.1%; ▌ Franklin P. Iams (Democratic) 18.7%; ▌ George H. Garber (Prohibition) 2.6%; ▌ Pennock E. Sharpless (Prohibition) 2.5%; ▌ John R. Root (Socialist Labor) 0.2%; ▌ Donald L. Monro (Socialist Labor) 0.2%; ▌ Dennis E. Johnston (Populist) 0.2%; ▌ J. Acker Guss (Liberty) 0.04%; ▌ Charles P. Shaw (Liberty) 0.04%
Pennsylvania at-large 2 seats on a general ticket.	Samuel A. Davenport	Republican	1896	Incumbent re-elected.	▌ ✓ Galusha A. Grow (Republican) 28.5%; ▌ ✓ Samuel A. Davenport (Republican) 27.8%; ▌ Jerry N. Weiler (Democratic/Populist) 19.1%; ▌ Franklin P. Iams (Democratic) 18.7%; ▌ George H. Garber (Prohibition) 2.6%; ▌ Pennock E. Sharpless (Prohibition) 2.5%; ▌ John R. Root (Socialist Labor) 0.2%; ▌ Donald L. Monro (Socialist Labor) 0.2%; ▌ Dennis E. Johnston (Populist) 0.2%; ▌ J. Acker Guss (Liberty) 0.04%; ▌ Charles P. Shaw (Liberty) 0.04%

== Rhode Island ==
District	Incumbent			This race	
District	Member	Party	First elected	Results	Candidates
Rhode Island 1	Melville Bull	Republican	1894	Incumbent re-elected.	▌ ✓ Melville Bull (Republican) 60.4%; ▌ John W. Hogan (Democratic) 31.9%; ▌ E. W. Theinert (Socialist Labor) 5.4%; ▌ Charles H. Tilley (Prohibition) 2.3%
Rhode Island 2	Adin B. Capron	Republican	1896	Incumbent re-elected.	▌ ✓ Adin B. Capron (Republican) 52.0%; ▌ Lucius F. C. Garvin (Democratic) 36.8%; ▌ Charles H. Dana (Socialist Labor) 8.4%; ▌ Frank B. Smith (Prohibition) 2.9%

== South Carolina ==
District	Incumbent			This race	
District	Member	Party	First elected	Results	Candidates
South Carolina 1	William Elliott	Democratic	1886; 1896	Incumbent re-elected.	▌ ✓ William Elliott (Democratic) 66.5%; ▌George W. Murray (Republican) 33.5%
South Carolina 2	W. Jasper Talbert	Democratic	1892	Incumbent re-elected.	▌ ✓ W. Jasper Talbert (Democratic) 97.0%; ▌B. P. Chatfield (Republican) 2.9%; Others 0.1%
South Carolina 3	Asbury Latimer	Democratic	1892	Incumbent re-elected.	▌ ✓ Asbury Latimer (Democratic) 96.6%; ▌John R. Tolbert (Republican) 3.3%; Others 0.1%
South Carolina 4	Stanyarne Wilson	Democratic	1894	Incumbent re-elected.	▌ ✓ Stanyarne Wilson (Democratic) 96.4%; ▌P. S. Suber (Republican) 3.6%
South Carolina 5	Thomas J. Strait	Democratic	1892	Incumbent lost renomination. Democratic hold.	▌ ✓ David E. Finley (Democratic) 100%
South Carolina 6	James Norton	Democratic	1897 (special)	Incumbent re-elected.	▌ ✓ James Norton (Democratic) 96.9%; ▌J. H. Evans (Republican) 3.1%
South Carolina 7	J. William Stokes	Democratic	1894	Incumbent re-elected.	▌ ✓ J. William Stokes (Democratic) 89.8%; ▌James Weston (Republican) 10.2%

== South Dakota ==
District	Incumbent			This race	
District	Member	Party	First elected	Results	Candidates
South Dakota at-large (2 seats)	John Edward Kelley	Populist	1896	Incumbent lost re-election. Republican gain.	Elected on a general ticket: ▌ ✓ Robert J. Gamble (Republican) 27.4%; ▌ ✓ Charles H. Burke (Republican) 25.7%; ▌John Edward Kelley (Populist) 22.9%; ▌Freeman Knowles (Populist) 22.8%; Others: ▌A. Jamison (Prohibition) 0.6%; ▌M. D. Alexander (Prohibition) 0.6%
South Dakota at-large (2 seats)	Freeman Knowles	Populist	1896	Incumbent lost re-election. Republican gain.	Elected on a general ticket: ▌ ✓ Robert J. Gamble (Republican) 27.4%; ▌ ✓ Charles H. Burke (Republican) 25.7%; ▌John Edward Kelley (Populist) 22.9%; ▌Freeman Knowles (Populist) 22.8%; Others: ▌A. Jamison (Prohibition) 0.6%; ▌M. D. Alexander (Prohibition) 0.6%

== Tennessee ==
District	Incumbent			This race	
District	Member	Party	First elected	Results	Candidates
Tennessee 1	Walter P. Brownlow	Republican	1896	Incumbent re-elected.	▌ ✓ Walter P. Brownlow (Republican) 54.96%; ▌Hugh H. Guckenour (Democratic) 44.12%; ▌R. S. Cheves (Prohibition) 0.92%
Tennessee 2	Henry R. Gibson	Republican	1894	Incumbent re-elected.	▌ ✓ Henry R. Gibson (Republican) 66.34%; ▌John M. Davis (Democratic) 33.07%; ▌[FNU] Jones (Unknown) 0.59%
Tennessee 3	John A. Moon	Democratic	1896	Incumbent re-elected.	▌ ✓ John A. Moon (Democratic) 58.87%; ▌Gus Cate (Republican) 40.62%; ▌W. A. Wetmore (Populist) 0.51%
Tennessee 4	Benton McMillin	Democratic	1878	Incumbent retired to run for governor. Democratic hold.	▌ ✓ Charles E. Snodgrass (Democratic) 62.29%; ▌George H. Morgan (Republican) 37.72%
Tennessee 5	James D. Richardson	Democratic	1884	Incumbent re-elected.	▌ ✓ James D. Richardson (Democratic) 69.52%; ▌W. Y. Elliott (Republican) 30.48%
Tennessee 6	John W. Gaines	Democratic	1896	Incumbent re-elected.	▌ ✓ John W. Gaines (Democratic) 78.78%; ▌J. C. Napier (Republican) 14.26%; ▌N. P. Gill (Prohibition) 6.97%
Tennessee 7	Nicholas N. Cox	Democratic	1890	Incumbent re-elected.	▌ ✓ Nicholas N. Cox (Democratic) 70.28%; ▌J. A. Cunningham (Independent) 29.72%
Tennessee 8	Thetus W. Sims	Democratic	1896	Incumbent re-elected.	▌ ✓ Thetus W. Sims (Democratic) 60.21%; ▌W. F. Hinkle (Republican) 36.86%; ▌T. J. Brooks (Populist) 2.94%
Tennessee 9	Rice A. Pierce	Democratic	1896	Incumbent re-elected.	▌ ✓ Rice A. Pierce (Democratic) 76.89%; ▌Isaac Revelle (Republican) 21.27%; ▌E. F. Falley (Prohibition) 1.84%
Tennessee 10	Edward W. Carmack	Democratic	1896	Incumbent re-elected.	▌ ✓ Edward W. Carmack (Democratic) 81.46%; ▌J. W. Vernon (Republican) 18.12%; ▌J. T. Brooks (Populist) 0.42%

== Texas ==
District	Incumbent			This race	
District	Member	Party	First elected	Results	Candidates
Texas 1	Thomas H. Ball	Democratic	1896	Incumbent re-elected.	▌ ✓ Thomas H. Ball (Democratic) 67.2%; ▌ O. A. Blackwell (Republican) 19.1%; ▌ Joe H. Eagle (Populist) 13.6%
Texas 2	Samuel B. Cooper	Democratic	1892	Incumbent re-elected.	▌ ✓ Samuel B. Cooper (Democratic) 68.9%; ▌ Thomas J. Russell (Populist) 24.5%; ▌ J. A. McAyeal (Republican) 6.3%
Texas 3	Reese C. De Graffenreid	Democratic	1896	Incumbent re-elected.	▌ ✓ Reese C. De Graffenreid (Democratic) 66.3%; ▌ H. D. Wood (Populist) 33.8%
Texas 4	John W. Cranford	Democratic	1896	Incumbent retired and than died. Democratic hold.	▌ ✓ John L. Sheppard (Democratic) 63.6%; ▌ J. L. Whittle (Populist) 36.4%
Texas 5	Joseph W. Bailey	Democratic	1890	Incumbent re-elected.	▌ ✓ Joseph W. Bailey (Democratic) 73.3%; ▌ W. S. Holt (Populist) 14.5%; ▌ Alexander W. Acheson (Republican) 10.7%; ▌ J. W. Thomas (Independent) 1.5%
Texas 6	Robert E. Burke	Democratic	1896	Incumbent re-elected.	▌ ✓ Robert E. Burke (Democratic) 65.8%; ▌ Thomas Gore (Populist) 25.4%; ▌ Andrew Jackson Houston (Republican) 8.8%
Texas 7	Robert L. Henry	Democratic	1896	Incumbent re-elected.	▌ ✓ Robert L. Henry (Democratic) 68.7%; ▌ A. W. Cunningham (Populist) 24.5%; ▌ Russell H. Kingsbury (Republican) 6.8%
Texas 8	S. W. T. Lanham	Democratic	1896	Incumbent re-elected.	▌ ✓ S. W. T. Lanham (Democratic) 58.1%; ▌ N. J. Shands (Populist) 34.9%; ▌ Arthur Springer (Republican) 7.0%
Texas 9	Joseph D. Sayers	Democratic	1884	Incumbent resigned when elected Governor of Texas. Democratic hold.	▌ ✓ Albert S. Burleson (Democratic) 61.7%; ▌ George Washington Jones (Populist/Republican) 38.3%
Texas 10	Robert B. Hawley	Republican	1896	Incumbent re-elected.	▌ ✓ Robert B. Hawley (Republican) 48.0%; ▌ W. S. Robson (Democratic) 44.5%; ▌ J. W. Baird (Populist) 7.0%
Texas 11	Rudolph Kleberg	Democratic	1896	Incumbent re-elected.	▌ ✓ Rudolph Kleberg (Democratic) 55.5%; ▌ B. L. Crouch (Republican) 44.5%
Texas 12	James Luther Slayden	Democratic	1896	Incumbent re-elected.	▌ ✓ James Luther Slayden (Democratic) 56.1%; ▌ George H. Noonan (Republican) 35.9%; ▌ A. B. Surber (Populist) 7.3%; ▌ Frank Leitner (Socialist Labor) 0.7%
Texas 13	John H. Stephens	Democratic	1896	Incumbent re-elected	▌ ✓ John H. Stephens (Democratic) 73.5%; ▌ J. J. Eager (Populist) 26.5%

== Utah ==
District	Incumbent			This race	
District	Member	Party	First elected	Results	Candidates
Utah at-large	William H. King	Democratic	1896	Incumbent lost renomination. House declined to seat winner. Democratic hold.	▌ ✓ B. H. Roberts (Democratic) 54.6%; ▌ Alma Eldredge (Republican) 45.4%

== Vermont ==
District	Incumbent			This race	
District	Member	Party	First elected	Results	Candidates
Vermont 1	H. Henry Powers	Republican	1890	Incumbent re-elected.	▌ ✓ H. Henry Powers (Republican) 71.7%; ▌Herbert F. Brigham (Democratic) 28.3%
Vermont 2	William W. Grout	Republican	1880; 1882 (lost); 1884	Incumbent re-elected.	▌ ✓ William W. Grout (Republican) 74.9%; ▌C. A. G. Jackson (Democratic) 24.9%; ▌Lavant M. Read (Republican) 0.2%

== Virginia ==
District	Incumbent			This race	
District	Member	Party	First elected	Results	Candidates
Virginia 1	William A. Jones	Democratic	1890	Incumbent re-elected.	▌ ✓ William A. Jones (Democratic) 66.5%; ▌Joseph A. Bristow (Republican) 31.8%; ▌H. L. Crockett (Prohibition) 0.8%
Virginia 2	Richard A. Wise	Republican	1896 (contest)	Incumbent lost re-election. Democratic gain.	▌ ✓ William A. Young (Democratic) 55.8%; ▌Richard A. Wise (Republican) 28.4%; ▌William S. Holland (Republican) 15.8%
Virginia 2	Richard A. Wise	Republican	1896 (contest)	Election successfully challenged. Republican gain.	▌ ✓ Richard A. Wise (Republican)
Virginia 3	John Lamb	Democratic	1896	Incumbent re-elected.	▌ ✓ John Lamb (Democratic) 69.1%; ▌Otis H. Russell (Republican) 18.8%; ▌Benjamin B. Weisiger (Republican) 11.1%; Others: ▌John J. Quantz (Unknown) 0.6%; ▌Allie Dillard (Unknown) 0.4%
Virginia 4	Robert Taylor Thorp	Republican	1894 (contest); 1896 (contest)	Incumbent lost re-election. Democratic gain.	▌ ✓ Sydney P. Epes (Democratic) 57.5%; ▌Robert Taylor Thorp (Republican) 39.2%; Others: ▌Booker Ellis (Republican) 1.7%; ▌Thomas L. Jones (Republican) 1.3%; ▌J. H. Beran (Unknown) 0.3%
Virginia 5	Claude A. Swanson	Democratic	1892	Incumbent re-elected.	▌ ✓ Claude A. Swanson (Democratic) 57.0%; ▌Edmund Parr (Republican) 41.8%; Others: ▌R. A. Bennett (Prohibition) 0.8%; ▌R. O. Martin (Republican) 0.2%; ▌C. T. Seay (Unknown) 0.2%
Virginia 6	Peter J. Otey	Democratic	1894	Incumbent re-elected.	▌ ✓ Peter J. Otey (Democratic) 66.9%; ▌Daniel Butler (Republican) 15.8%; ▌Charles A. Heermans (Republican) 14.4%; ▌Ira W. Kimmell (Unknown) 2.4%; ▌D. G. Revere (Unknown) 0.5%
Virginia 7	James Hay	Democratic	1896	Incumbent re-elected.	▌ ✓ James Hay (Democratic) 77.1%; ▌D. C. O'Flaherty (Democratic) 22.9%
Virginia 8	John Franklin Rixey	Democratic	1896	Incumbent re-elected.	▌ ✓ John Franklin Rixey (Democratic) 88.8%; ▌Edward Hughes (Independent) 8.5%; Others: ▌J. P. Johnson (Prohibition) 1.9%; ▌John Underwood (Republican) 0.9%
Virginia 9	James A. Walker	Republican	1892	Incumbent lost re-election. Democratic gain.	▌ ✓ William F. Rhea (Democratic) 51.0%; ▌James A. Walker (Republican) 48.8%; Others: ▌Thaddeus E. Harris (Independent) 0.2%; ▌John W. Watkins (Unknown) 0.2%
Virginia 10	Jacob Yost	Republican	1896	Incumbent retired. Democratic gain.	▌ ✓ Julian M. Quarles (Democratic) 56.3%; ▌Robert T. Hubard (Republican) 43.4%; ▌Frank Smith (Independent) 0.3%

== Washington ==
District	Incumbent			This race	
District	Member	Party	First elected	Results	Candidates
Washington at-large (2 seats elected on a general ticket)	William Carey Jones	Silver Republican	1896	Incumbent lost re-election. Republican gain.	▌ ✓ Wesley L. Jones (Republican) 26.2%; ▌ ✓ Francis W. Cushman (Republican) 25.6%; ▌ J. Hamilton Lewis (Fusion) 23.9%; ▌ William Carey Jones (Fusion) 21.6%; ▌ A. C. Dickinson (Prohibition) 0.8%; ▌ C. L. Haggard (Prohibition) 0.7%; ▌ M. A. Hamilton (Socialist Labor) 0.6%; ▌ Walter Walker (Socialist Labor) 0.6%
Washington at-large (2 seats elected on a general ticket)	J. Hamilton Lewis	Democratic	1896	Incumbent lost re-election. Republican gain.	▌ ✓ Wesley L. Jones (Republican) 26.2%; ▌ ✓ Francis W. Cushman (Republican) 25.6%; ▌ J. Hamilton Lewis (Fusion) 23.9%; ▌ William Carey Jones (Fusion) 21.6%; ▌ A. C. Dickinson (Prohibition) 0.8%; ▌ C. L. Haggard (Prohibition) 0.7%; ▌ M. A. Hamilton (Socialist Labor) 0.6%; ▌ Walter Walker (Socialist Labor) 0.6%

== West Virginia ==
District	Incumbent			This race	
District	Member	Party	First elected	Results	Candidates
West Virginia 1	Blackburn B. Dovener	Republican	1894	Incumbent re-elected.	▌ ✓ Blackburn B. Dovener (Republican) 51.91%; ▌J. V. Blair (Democratic) 47.29%; Others: ▌W. A. Williams (Independent) 0.63%; ▌J. B. Arnold (Independent) 0.17%
West Virginia 2	Alston G. Dayton	Republican	1894	Incumbent re-elected.	▌ ✓ Alston G. Dayton (Republican) 50.33%; ▌John T. McGraw (Democratic) 48.98%; ▌George Morrow (Populist) 0.69%
West Virginia 3	Charles Dorr	Republican	1896	Incumbent retired. Democratic gain.	▌ ✓ David E. Johnston (Democratic) 50.63%; ▌William S. Edwards (Republican) 48.93%; ▌J. W. Davis (Populist) 0.45%
West Virginia 4	Warren Miller	Republican	1894	Incumbent retired. Republican hold.	▌ ✓ Romeo H. Freer (Republican) 50.84%; ▌George I. Neal (Democratic) 48.79%; ▌Oliver Gorrell (Populist) 0.37%

== Wisconsin ==
Wisconsin elected ten members of Congress on Election Day, November 8, 1898.

District	Incumbent			This race	
District	Member	Party	First elected	Results	Candidates
Wisconsin 1	Henry Allen Cooper	Republican	1892	Incumbent re-elected.	▌ ✓ Henry Allen Cooper (Republican) 61.5%; ▌Clinton Babbitt (Democratic) 35.4%; ▌John C. Huffman (Prohibition) 3.1%
Wisconsin 2	Edward Sauerhering	Republican	1894	Incumbent retired. Republican hold.	▌ ✓ Herman Dahle (Republican) 50.4%; ▌James E. Jones (Democratic) 47.0%; ▌Jabez B. Smith (Prohibition) 2.6%
Wisconsin 3	Joseph W. Babcock	Republican	1892	Incumbent re-elected.	▌ ✓ Joseph W. Babcock (Republican) 59.5%; ▌Thomas L. Cleary (Democratic) 37.3%; ▌Richard B. Griggs (Prohibition) 3.2%
Wisconsin 4	Theobald Otjen	Republican	1894	Incumbent re-elected.	▌ ✓ Theobald Otjen (Republican) 47.3%; ▌Joseph G. Donnelly (Democratic) 41.7%; ▌Robert C. Schilling (Populist) 6.6%; ▌Louis A. Arnold (Social Democratic) 3.0%; ▌John Moser (Socialist Labor) 1.5%
Wisconsin 5	Samuel S. Barney	Republican	1894	Incumbent re-elected.	▌ ✓ Samuel S. Barney (Republican) 51.8%; ▌Charles E. Armin (Democratic) 40.2%; ▌George Eckelman (Social Democratic) 3.3%; ▌William P. Rubin (Populist) 3.0%; ▌Albert F. Hintz (Socialist Labor) 1.0%; ▌William R. Nethercut (Prohibition) 0.7%
Wisconsin 6	James H. Davidson	Republican	1896	Incumbent re-elected.	▌ ✓ James H. Davidson (Republican) 53.6%; ▌Frank C. Stewart (Democratic) 44.4%; ▌William H. Clark (Prohibition) 2.0%
Wisconsin 7	Michael Griffin	Republican	1894	Incumbent retired. Republican hold.	▌ ✓ John J. Esch (Republican) 64.7%; ▌John F. Doherty (Democratic) 32.6%; ▌Luther W. Wood (Prohibition) 2.8%
Wisconsin 8	Edward S. Minor	Republican	1894	Incumbent re-elected.	▌ ✓ Edward S. Minor (Republican) 54.2%; ▌Philip Sheridan (Democratic) 43.8%; ▌John W. Evans (Prohibition) 2.0%
Wisconsin 9	Alexander Stewart	Republican	1894	Incumbent re-elected.	▌ ✓ Alexander Stewart (Republican) 58.1%; ▌Wells M. Ruggles (Democratic) 40.1%; ▌Edwin Kerswill (Prohibition) 1.8%
Wisconsin 10	John J. Jenkins	Republican	1894	Incumbent re-elected.	▌ ✓ John J. Jenkins (Republican) 63.1%; ▌John R. Mathews (Democratic) 30.3%; ▌William B. Hopkins (Prohibition) 3.5%; ▌Carl Pieper (Populist) 3.1%

== Wyoming ==
District	Incumbent			This race	
District	Member	Party	First elected	Results	Candidates
Wyoming at-large	John E. Osborne	Democratic	1896	Incumbent retired. Republican gain.	▌ ✓ Frank W. Mondell (Republican) 54.71%; ▌Constantine P. Arnold (Democratic) 43.04%; ▌William Brown (Populist) 2.25%

== Non-voting delegates ==
District	Incumbent			This race	
District	Delegate	Party	First elected	Results	Candidates
Arizona Territory at-large
New Mexico Territory at-large
Oklahoma Territory at-large	James Y. Callahan	Free Silver	1896	Incumbent retired. Republican gain.	▌ ✓ Dennis T. Flynn (Republican); [data missing]

== See also ==
- 1898 United States elections
  - 1898–99 United States Senate elections
- 55th United States Congress
- 56th United States Congress

== Bibliography ==
- Dubin, Michael J. (March 1, 1998). United States Congressional Elections, 1788-1997: The Official Results of the Elections of the 1st Through 105th Congresses. McFarland and Company. ISBN 978-0786402830.
- Martis, Kenneth C. (January 1, 1989). The Historical Atlas of Political Parties in the United States Congress, 1789-1989. Macmillan Publishing Company. ISBN 978-0029201701.
- Moore, John L., ed. (1994). Congressional Quarterly's Guide to U.S. Elections (Third ed.). Congressional Quarterly Inc. ISBN 978-0871879967.
- "Party Divisions of the House of Representatives* 1789–Present". Office of the Historian, House of United States House of Representatives.
