= 1898 United States House of Representatives elections in Florida =

United States House of Representatives elections in Florida, 1898
- November 8, 1898

Both of Florida's seats to the United States House of Representatives
	Majority party	Minority party
Party	Democratic	Republican
Last election	2	0
Seats won	2	0
Seat change	Steady	Steady
Popular vote	25,656	7,316
Percentage	77.8%	22.2%

Elections to the United States House of Representatives in Florida for two seats in the 56th Congress were held November 8, 1898

== Background ==
The previous election year had seen a total of five parties contesting Florida's two seats, including the Republican Party, which had been absent in 1892 and 1894. Both seats were won by the Democratic incumbents by a large majority. The previous three elections had seen Populist candidates as well, but, mirroring the national decline of that party, there were no Populist candidates in 1896.

== Election results ==
1898 United States House election results
District	Democratic			Republican		
1st	Stephen M. Sparkman (I)	13,506	84.2%	E. R. Gunby	2,543	15.8%
2nd	Robert Wyche Davis (I)	12,150	71.8%	H. L. Anderson	4,773	28.2%

== See also ==
- 1898 United States House of Representatives elections
