= Florida's 2nd congressional district =

U.S. House district for Florida

Coordinates: 30°16′58″N 84°43′49″W

- Map of district boundaries since January 3, 2023 (Note: The district includes the same census blocks as drawn for the 2020 redistricting cycle in 2022 and during mid-decade redistricting in 2026. As such, boundaries of the district will not change at the 2026 elections.) (Interactive map version)
- Representative: Neal Dunn; R–Panama City
- Area: 12,871 mi^{2} (33,340 km^{2})
- Distribution: 51.34% urban; 48.66% rural
- Population (2025): 824,548
- Median household income: $67,918
- Ethnicity: 63.3% White; 22.5% Black; 7.1% Hispanic; 4.2% Two or more races; 2.1% Asian; 0.8% other
- Cook PVI: R+8

Florida's 2nd congressional district is a congressional district in the U.S. state of Florida. The district consists of the eastern part of the Florida Panhandle along with much of the Big Bend region along the Emerald Coast. It straddles both the Eastern and Central time zones. It includes Tallahassee, the state capital, and Panama City. With 49% of its residents living in rural areas, it is the least urbanized district in the state, and the voters are generally conservative. The district is represented by Republican Neal Dunn of Panama City.

== Characteristics ==
Florida's 2nd Congressional District is the largest congressional district in Florida by land area and consists of all of Bay, Calhoun, Franklin, Gadsden, Gulf, Holmes, Jackson, Jefferson, Leon, Liberty, Madison, Taylor, Wakulla, and Washington counties, as well as portions of Walton and Lafayette.

Most of the territory now in the 2nd was the 9th District from 1963 to 1983; it has been the 2nd since 1983. For most of its existence, the 2nd and its predecessors were centered in Tallahassee, the state capital and county seat of Leon County. While the adjacent 1st and 3rd congressional districts had become the most conservative districts in the state by the 1990s, the 2nd District was historically more of a swing district. With a large population of students, government workers and university faculty, Tallahassee was far more liberal than the rest of the district. Democrat Barack Obama received 62 percent of the Leon County vote in the 2008 presidential election, but Republican John McCain received 54 percent of the 2nd district's vote overall. The district had become somewhat friendlier to Republicans when conservative-leaning Panama City was shifted from the 1st District.

The district was significantly redrawn in a court-ordered redistricting that took effect for the 2016 election, following a lawsuit that challenged the district as gerrymandered, preventing African Americans from being able to elect representatives of their choice although they comprised a significant part of the population in the state. Under the new map, most of Tallahassee, along with nearly all of the 2nd's black residents, were drawn into the 5th District.

To make up for the loss in population, the 2nd was shifted slightly to the south to take in territory previously in the nearby 3rd and 11th districts. On paper, the new 2nd was more than 12 points more Republican than its predecessor. Mitt Romney had carried the old 2nd in 2012 although he received only 52 percent of the vote. By comparison, Romney would have carried the new 2nd with 64 percent of the vote in 2012, making it on paper the third-most Republican district in the state.

== Voting ==
=== Recent election results from statewide races ===
Year	Office	Results
2008	President	McCain 53% - 46%
2010	Senate	Rubio 50% - 21%
2010	Governor	Sink 53% - 47%
2010	Attorney General	Bondi 50% - 41%
2010	Chief Financial Officer	Atwater 48% - 47%
2012	President	Romney 54% - 46%
2012	Senate	Nelson 55% - 45%
2014	Governor	Scott 53% - 47%
2016	President	Trump 54% - 42%
2016	Senate	Rubio 55% - 41%
2018	Senate	Scott 53% - 47%
2018	Governor	DeSantis 53% - 46%
2018	Attorney General	Moody 55% - 43%
2018	Chief Financial Officer	Patronis 57% - 43%
2020	President	Trump 55% - 44%
2022	Senate	Rubio 60% - 39%
2022	Governor	DeSantis 62% - 38%
2022	Attorney General	Moody 64% - 36%
2022	Chief Financial Officer	Patronis 64% - 36%
2024	President	Trump 59% - 41%
2024	Senate	Scott 60% - 38%

=== Voter registration ===
Voter Registration and Party Enrollment as of February 20, 2024
Party	Voters	Percentage
Republican	218,080	42.98%
Democratic	187,805	37.01%
No Party Affiliation	84,548	17.90%

== Composition ==
For the 118th and successive Congresses (based on redistricting following the 2020 census), the district contains all or portions of the following counties and communities:

Bay County (13)

All 13 communities

Calhoun County (2)

Altha, Blountstown

Franklin County (4)

All 4 communities

Gadsden County (6)

All 6 communities

Gulf County (2)

Port St. Joe, Wewahitchka

Holmes County (5)

All 5 communities

Jackson County (11)

All 11 communities

Jefferson County (6)

All 6 communities

Lafayette County (1)

Day (part; also 3rd)

Leon County (7)

All 7 communities

Liberty County (4)

All 4 communities

Madison County (3)

All 3 communities

Taylor County (2)

Perry, Steinhatchee

Wakulla County (4)

All 4 communities

Walton County (1)

DeFuniak Springs

Washington County (5)

All 5 communities

== List of members representing the district ==
Representative	Party	Years	Cong ress	Electoral history	District location
District created March 4, 1875
Josiah T. Walls (Gainesville)	Republican	March 4, 1875 – April 19, 1876	44th	Redistricted from the at-large district. Lost contested election.	
Jesse J. Finley (Jacksonville)	Democratic	April 19, 1876 – March 3, 1877	44th	Won contested election. Lost re-election.	
Horatio Bisbee Jr. (Jacksonville)	Republican	March 4, 1877 – February 20, 1879	45th	Elected in 1876. Lost contested election.	
Jesse J. Finley (Jacksonville)	Democratic	February 20, 1879 – March 3, 1879	45th	Won contested election. Retired.	
Noble A. Hull (Sanford)	Democratic	March 4, 1879 – January 22, 1881	46th	Elected in 1878. Lost contested election.	
Horatio Bisbee Jr. (Jacksonville)	Republican	January 22, 1881 – March 3, 1881	46th	Won contested election. Re-elected in 1880.	
Jesse J. Finley (Jacksonville)	Democratic	March 4, 1881 – June 1, 1882	47th	Elected in 1880. Lost contested election.	
Horatio Bisbee Jr. (Jacksonville)	Republican	June 1, 1882 – March 3, 1885	47th 48th	Won contested election. Re-elected in 1882. Lost re-election.	
Charles Dougherty (Port Orange)	Democratic	March 4, 1885 – March 3, 1889	49th 50th	Elected in 1884. Re-elected in 1886. Retired.	
Robert Bullock (Ocala)	Democratic	March 4, 1889 – March 3, 1893	51st 52nd	Elected in 1888. Re-elected in 1890. Retired.	
Charles M. Cooper (Jacksonville)	Democratic	March 4, 1893 – March 3, 1897	53rd 54th	Elected in 1892. Re-elected in 1894. Retired.	
Robert W. Davis (Palatka)	Democratic	March 4, 1897 – March 3, 1905	55th 56th 57th 58th	Elected in 1896. Re-elected in 1898. Re-elected in 1900. Re-elected in 1902. Retired to run for Governor of Florida.	
Frank Clark (Gainesville)	Democratic	March 4, 1905 – March 3, 1925	59th 60th 61st 62nd 63rd 64th 65th 66th 67th 68th	Elected in 1904. Re-elected in 1906. Re-elected in 1908. Re-elected in 1910. Re-elected in 1912. Re-elected in 1914. Re-elected in 1916. Re-elected in 1918. Re-elected in 1920. Re-elected in 1922. Lost renomination.	
Robert A. Green (Starke)	Democratic	March 4, 1925 – January 3, 1943	69th 70th 71st 72nd 73rd 74th 75th 76th 77th	Elected in 1924. Re-elected in 1926. Re-elected in 1928. Re-elected in 1930. Re-elected in 1932. Re-elected in 1934. Re-elected in 1936. Re-elected in 1938. Re-elected in 1940. Redistricted to the at-large district.	
Emory H. Price (Jacksonville)	Democratic	January 3, 1943 – January 3, 1949	78th 79th 80th	Elected in 1942. Re-elected in 1944. Re-elected in 1946. Lost renomination.	
Charles E. Bennett (Jacksonville)	Democratic	January 3, 1949 – January 3, 1967	81st 82nd 83rd 84th 85th 86th 87th 88th 89th	Elected in 1948. Re-elected in 1950. Re-elected in 1952. Re-elected in 1954. Re-elected in 1956. Re-elected in 1958. Re-elected in 1960. Re-elected in 1962. Re-elected in 1964. Redistricted to the 3rd district.	
Don Fuqua (Altha)	Democratic	January 3, 1967 – January 3, 1987	90th 91st 92nd 93rd 94th 95th 96th 97th 98th 99th	Redistricted from the 9th district and re-elected in 1966. Re-elected in 1968. Re-elected in 1970. Re-elected in 1972. Re-elected in 1974. Re-elected in 1976. Re-elected in 1978. Re-elected in 1980. Re-elected in 1982. Re-elected in 1984. Retired.	
Bill Grant (Madison)	Democratic	January 3, 1987 – February 21, 1989	100th 101st	Elected in 1986. Re-elected in 1988. Lost re-election.	
Bill Grant (Madison)	Republican	February 21, 1989 – January 3, 1991	101st	Elected in 1986. Re-elected in 1988. Lost re-election.	
Pete Peterson (Marianna)	Democratic	January 3, 1991 – January 3, 1997	102nd 103rd 104th	Elected in 1990. Re-elected in 1992. Re-elected in 1994. Retired.	
Allen Boyd (Monticello)	Democratic	January 3, 1997 – January 3, 2011	105th 106th 107th 108th 109th 110th 111th	Elected in 1996. Re-elected in 1998. Re-elected in 2000. Re-elected in 2002. Re-elected in 2004. Re-elected in 2006. Re-elected in 2008. Lost re-election.	
Allen Boyd (Monticello)	Democratic	January 3, 1997 – January 3, 2011	105th 106th 107th 108th 109th 110th 111th	Elected in 1996. Re-elected in 1998. Re-elected in 2000. Re-elected in 2002. Re-elected in 2004. Re-elected in 2006. Re-elected in 2008. Lost re-election.	2003–2013
Steve Southerland (Panama City)	Republican	January 3, 2011 – January 3, 2015	112th 113th	Elected in 2010. Re-elected in 2012. Lost re-election.	2003–2013
Steve Southerland (Panama City)	Republican	January 3, 2011 – January 3, 2015	112th 113th	Elected in 2010. Re-elected in 2012. Lost re-election.	2013–2023
Gwen Graham (Tallahassee)	Democratic	January 3, 2015 – January 3, 2017	114th	Elected in 2014. Retired due to redistricting.	2013–2023
Neal Dunn (Panama City)	Republican	January 3, 2017 – present	115th 116th 117th 118th 119th	Elected in 2016. Re-elected in 2018. Re-elected in 2020. Re-elected in 2022; Re-elected in 2024. Retiring at the end of term.	2017–2023
Neal Dunn (Panama City)	Republican	January 3, 2017 – present	115th 116th 117th 118th 119th	Elected in 2016. Re-elected in 2018. Re-elected in 2020. Re-elected in 2022; Re-elected in 2024. Retiring at the end of term.	2023–present
Austin Rogers (Panama City)	Republican	Assuming office on January 3, 2027		Elected in 2026.	2023–present

== Election results ==
=== 2002 ===
Florida's 2nd Congressional District Election (2002)
Party	Candidate	Votes	%
Democratic	Allen Boyd*	152,164	67%
Republican	Tom McGurk	75,275	33%
Total votes		227,439	100%
Turnout			
Democratic hold			

=== 2004 ===
Florida's 2nd Congressional District Election (2004)
Party	Candidate	Votes	%
Democratic	Allen Boyd*	201,577	62%
Republican	Bev Kilmer	125,399	38%
Total votes		326,976	100%
Turnout			
Democratic hold			

=== 2006 ===
Florida's 2nd Congressional District Election (2006)
Party	Candidate	Votes	%
Democratic	Allen Boyd*		100%
Total votes			100%
Turnout			
Democratic hold			

=== 2008 ===
Florida's 2nd Congressional District Election (2008)
Party	Candidate	Votes	%
Democratic	Allen Boyd*	216,804	62%
Republican	Mark Mulligan	133,404	38%
No party	Others	159	0.05
Total votes		350,367	100%
Turnout			
Democratic hold			

=== 2010 ===
Florida's 2nd Congressional District Election (2010)
Party	Candidate	Votes	%
Republican	Steve Southerland	136,371	54%
Democratic	Allen Boyd*	105,211	41%
Independent	Paul Crandall McKain	7,135	3%
Independent	Dianne J. Berryhill	5,705	2%
No party	Others	16	0
Total votes		254,438	100%
Turnout			
Republican gain from Democratic			

=== 2012 ===
Florida's 2nd Congressional District Election (2012)
Party	Candidate	Votes	%
Republican	Steve Southerland*	175,856	53%
Democratic	Alfred Lawson, Jr.	157,634	47%
No party	Floyd Patrick Miller	228	0.01
Total votes		333,718	100%
Turnout			
Republican hold			

=== 2014 ===
Florida's 2nd Congressional District Election, (2014)
Party	Candidate	Votes	%
Democratic	Gwen Graham	126,096	50.5%
Republican	Steve Southerland*	123,262	49.3%
Write-in	Luther Lee	422	0.2%
Total votes		249,780	100%
Democratic gain from Republican			

=== 2016 ===
Florida's 2nd Congressional District Election (2016)
Party	Candidate	Votes	%
Republican	Neal Dunn	231,163	67%
Democratic	Walter Dartland	102,801	30%
Libertarian	Rob Lapham	9,395	3%
No party	Others	3	0
Total votes		343,362	100%
Turnout			
Republican gain from Democratic			

=== 2018 ===
Florida's 2nd Congressional District Election (2018)
Party	Candidate	Votes	%
Republican	Neal Dunn (Incumbent)	199,335	67.4%
Democratic	Bob Rackleff	96,233	32.6%
Total votes		295,568	100%
Turnout			
Republican hold			

=== 2020 ===
2020 United States House of Representatives elections in Florida
Party	Candidate	Votes	%
Republican	Neal Dunn (incumbent)	305,337	97.86%
Independent	Kim O'Connor (write-in)	6,662	2.14%
Total votes		311,999	100.0
Republican hold			

=== 2022 ===
2022 United States House of Representatives elections in Florida
Party	Candidate	Votes	%
Republican	Neal Dunn (incumbent)	180,236	59.8%
Democratic	Al Lawson	121,153	40.2%
Total votes		301,389	100.0
Republican hold			

=== 2024 ===
2024 United States House of Representatives elections in Florida
Party	Candidate	Votes	%
Republican	Neal Dunn (incumbent)	247,957	61.64
Democratic	Yen Bailey	154,323	38.36
Total votes		402,280	100.00
Republican hold			
