= 1896 United States House of Representatives elections in Florida =

United States House of Representatives elections in Florida, 1896
- November 3, 1896

Both of Florida's seats to the United States House of Representatives
	Majority party	Minority party	Third party
Party	Democratic	Republican	Populist
Last election	2	0	0
Seats won	2	0	0
Seat change	Steady	Steady	Steady
Popular vote	30,355	9,431	2,163
Percentage	71.7%	22.3%	5.1%

Elections to the United States House of Representatives in Florida were held November 3, 1896 for two seats in the 55th Congress. These elections were held at the same time as the 1896 Presidential election and the election for Governor.

There were a total of five different parties running, including a short-lived breakaway faction of the Democratic Party known as the National Democratic Party.

== Background ==
The previous two elections had involved only the Democratic and People's Parties. The Republicans returned to Floridian congressional elections in this race, as did the Prohibition Party, which had last run a candidate for Congress in Florida in 1886.

== Election results ==
Charles Merian Cooper (D) of the 2nd district did not run for renomination.

1896 United States House election results
District	Democratic			National Democratic			Republican			Populist			Prohibition		
1st	Stephen M. Sparkman (I)	14,823	77.5%				E. K. Nichols	2,797	14.6%	J. Asakiah Williams	1,308	6.8%	J. C. Green	201	1.1%
2nd	Robert Wyche Davis	14,376	61.9%	Daniel G. Ambler	1,156	5.0%	Joseph N. Stripling	6,634	28.6%	William R. Peterson	855	3.7%	M. E. Spencer	195	0.8%

== See also ==
- United States House of Representatives elections, 1896
