= 1898 United States House of Representatives election in Wyoming =

- November 8, 1898
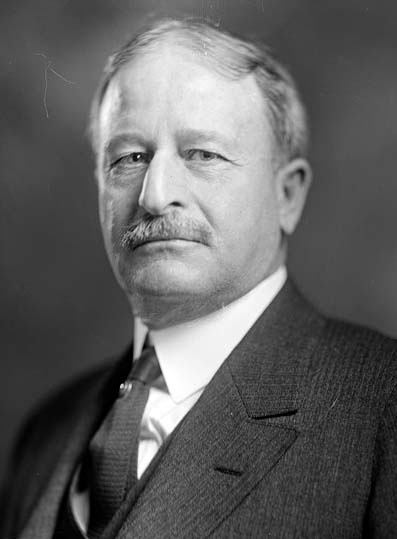
Nominee	Frank Wheeler Mondell	Constantine P. Arnold
Party	Republican	Democratic
Popular vote	10,762	8,466
Percentage	54.71%	43.04%
- County results Mondell: 40–50% 50–60% 60–70% 70–80% Arnold: 50–60%
U.S. Representative before election
John Eugene Osborne
Democratic
Elected U.S. Representative
Frank Wheeler Mondell
Republican

The Wyoming United States House election for 1898 was held on November 8, 1898. Former Republican representative Frank Wheeler Mondell defeated Democratic Constantine P. Arnold with 54.71% of the vote, making Mondell the first former representative to regain his seat in Wyoming and the first to hold the office for two terms.

== Results ==
United States House of Representatives election in Wyoming, 1898
Party	Candidate	Votes	%
Republican	Frank Wheeler Mondell	10,762	54.71%
Democratic	Constantine P. Arnold	8,466	43.04%
Populist	William Brown	443	2.25%
Total votes		19,671	100%
