= 1886 United States House of Representatives elections in Florida =

United States House of Representatives elections in Florida, 1886
- November 2, 1886

Both of Florida's seats to the United States House of Representatives
	Majority party	Minority party	Third party
Party	Democratic	Republican	Prohibition
Last election	2	0	0
Seats won	2	0	0
Seat change	Steady	Steady	Steady
Popular vote	33,383	23,152	420
Percentage	58.6%	40.6%	0.7%

The 1886 United States House of Representatives elections in Florida were held November 2, 1886 for the 50th Congress.

== Background ==
The previous elections had solidified Democratic domination of Florida's congressional delegation. Florida would be represented entirely by Democrats in both houses of Congress until 1954

== Election results ==
Both incumbents ran successfully for re-election. This election marked the first appearance of the Prohibition Party in Florida's congressional elections.

1886 United States House election results
District	Democratic			Republican			Prohibition		
1st	Robert H. M. Davidson (I)	14,493	66.2%	C. B. Pendleton	7,389	33.8%			
2nd	Charles Dougherty (I)	18,890	53.9%	J. C. Greeley	15,763	44.9%	R. B. Norment	420	1.2%

== See also ==
- United States House of Representatives elections, 1886
