= Alma Eldredge =

American politician (1841–1925)

Alma Eldredge (October 13, 1841 – February 22, 1925) was a member of the Utah Territorial Legislature and a mayor of Coalville, Utah.

Eldredge was born in Warren Township, Marion County, Indiana. His family were Latter-day Saints and named his after the Book of Mormon prophet Alma. Eldredge came to Utah Territory with his parents in 1847 and in 1849 settled in American Fork, Utah. In 1861 he moved to a place along the Weber River named Eldredge's Springs after him. In 1863 he married Marinda M. Merril. They had a total of six children.

In 1866 as a result of Utah's Black Hawk War the leaders of the Church of Jesus Christ of Latter-day Saints (LDS Church) instructed the settlers along the upper Weber River to move together in a central location. Eldredge followed this advice and thus became one of the first settlers of Coalville, Utah. The following year he was elected to the city council there.

From 1868 to 1871 Eldredge served as an LDS Church missionary in Great Britain. At various times Eldredge worked in railroad building, brick making and as a store owner.

He was elected mayor of Coalville in 1874. In 1878 he was elected Summit County prosecutor and a member of the Utah Territorial Board of Trade. In 1883 he was elected a Probate Judge. He was a member of the Utah Constitutional Conventions of 1882, 1887 and 1895, the last one seeing its constitution actually enacted with Utah finally gaining statehood. In 1893 Eldredge was elected to the Territorial Legislature. He ran as a Republican for the United States Congress in 1898 but lost to B. H. Roberts.

From 1877 to 1901 Eldredge served as a counselor to William W. Cluff in the presidency of the Summit Stake of the LDS Church.
