= Hardy Brian =

Louisiana newspaper man and political party leader (1865–1949)

Hardy L. Brian (1865–1949) was a newspaper publisher and populist political party leader in Louisiana. He published the Winnfield Comrade in Winnfield, Louisiana. A leader in the Populist Party in Louisiana, he also established the Louisiana Populist newspaper in 1894 in Natchitoches. He closed it on March 9, 1899, returned to Winn Parish, and became a civic and church leader. He purchased the Winnfield Times in 1916 and edited it for two years.
