= 1896 United States House of Representatives election in Wyoming =

- November 3, 1896
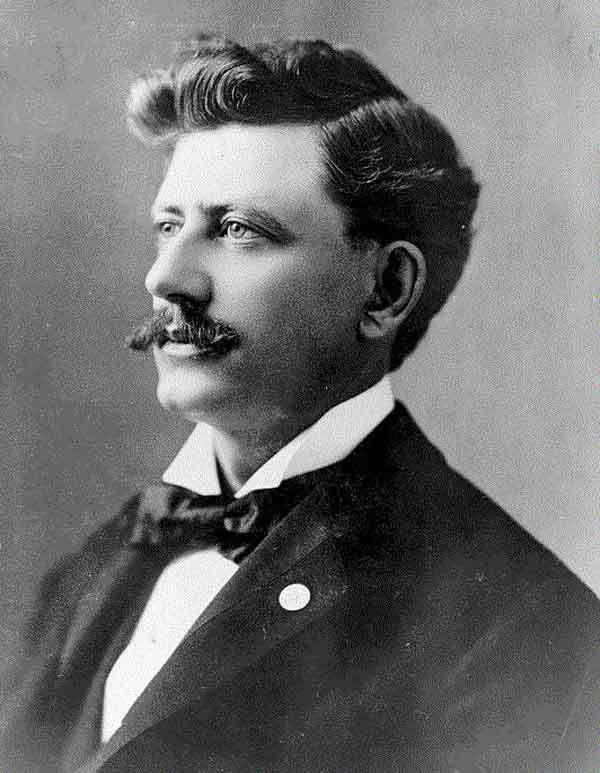

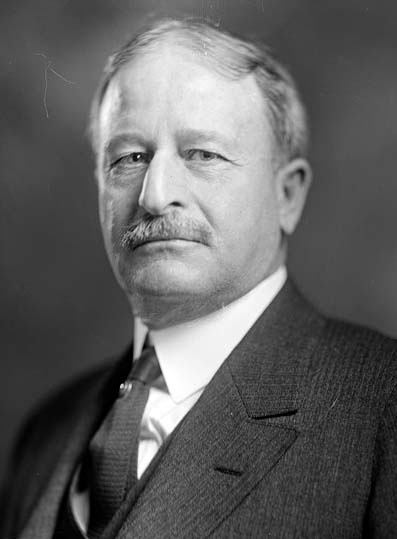
Nominee	John Eugene Osborne	Frank Wheeler Mondell
Party	Democratic	Republican
Popular vote	10,310	10,044
Percentage	49.14%	47.87%
- County results Osborne: 40–50% 50–60% 60–70% Mondell: 50–60% 60–70%
U.S. Representative before election
Frank Wheeler Mondell
Republican
Elected U.S. Representative
John Eugene Osborne
Democratic

The Wyoming United States House election for 1896 was held on November 3, 1896. Democratic John Eugene Osborne defeated Republican incumbent Frank Wheeler Mondell with 49.14% of the vote making Mondell the third incumbent Representative from Wyoming to lose reelection and was the third time in a row that the incumbent had lost. It was the first time that the House election was won with only a plurality of the votes.

== Results ==
United States House of Representatives election in Wyoming, 1896
Party	Candidate	Votes	%
Democratic	John Eugene Osborne	10,310	49.14%
Republican	Frank Wheeler Mondell (inc.)	10,044	47.87%
Populist	William Brown	628	2.99%
Total votes		20,982	100%
