= Robert Wyche Davis =

American politician (1849–1929)

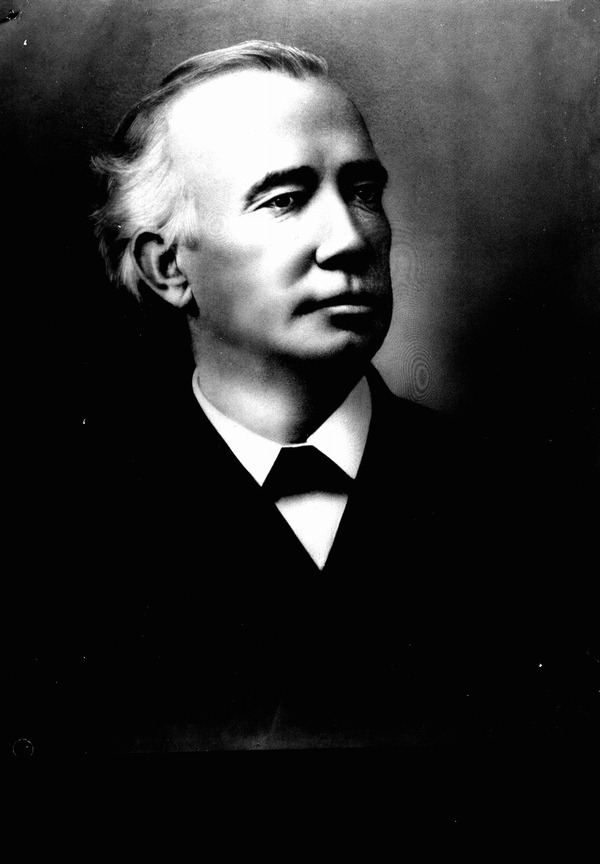
- Robert Wyche Davis

Member of the U.S. House of Representatives from Florida's 2nd district
- In office March 4, 1897 – March 3, 1905
- Preceded by: Stephen Mallory II
- Succeeded by: Frank Clark

Speaker of the Florida House of Representatives
- In office 1885–1885
- Preceded by: Samuel Pasco
- Succeeded by: Malcolm N. McInnis

Member of the Florida House of Representatives
- In office 1884–1885
- Constituency: Clay County

Personal details
- Born: March 15, 1849 Near Albany, Georgia, U.S.
- Died: September 15, 1929 (aged 80) Gainesville, Florida, U.S.
- Resting place: Evergreen Cemetery, Gainesville
- Party: Democratic
- Occupation: Lawyer, Newspaper editor
- Profession: Politician

Military service
- Branch/service: Confederate States Army
- Years of service: 1863–1865
- Rank: Private
- Unit: 5th Georgia Volunteer Infantry Regiment

Robert Wyche Davis (March 15, 1849 – September 15, 1929) was a United States representative from Florida. He served in the Confederate Army and became a lawyer. He served in the Florida House of Representatives including as Speaker of the Florida House of Representatives. Later in his career he was a newspaper editor and mayor.

== Early life in Georgia ==
Born near Albany, Georgia, Davis attended public schools. He enlisted in 1863 in the Fifth Georgia Volunteer Infantry Regiment of the Confederate States Army, and served until the surrender of his company on April 26, 1865. He later studied law in Florida. He was admitted to the bar in 1869 and commenced practice in Blakely, Georgia.

== Florida ==
He moved to Florida in 1879 and practiced law in Green Cove Springs, Clay County, then in Gainesville, Alachua County, and afterward in Palatka, Putnam County. He served as member of the Florida House of Representatives from Clay County in 1884 and 1885, serving as Speaker of the House the latter year. He also acted as the "general attorney" for the Florida Southern Railway in 1885, but resigned from the post upon being elected to the U.S. Congress.

Davis was elected as a Democratic Representative to the Fifty-fifth and to the three succeeding Congresses (March 4, 1897 – March 3, 1905). He was not a candidate for renomination in 1904 to the Fifty-ninth Congress.

He resumed the practice of law in Palatka, and Tampa, Florida. He moved to Gainesville, Florida, in 1914 and served as register of the United States Land Office at Gainesville 1914-1922. He was editor of the Gainesville Sun and was mayor of Gainesville in 1924 and 1925.

He resumed the practice of law in 1928. He died in Gainesville, Florida, September 15, 1929. He was interred in Evergreen Cemetery in Gainesville.

== Family ==
Robert Wyche Davis's great grandfather was Jonathan Davis, born in England circa 1730. Jonathan Davis was married to Lucy Gibbs, the daughter of a prominent family from Virginia.

U.S. House of Representatives
Preceded by Charles M. Cooper	Member of the U.S. House of Representatives from Florida's 2nd congressional district 1897 – 1905	Succeeded by Frank Clark
