= 1894 United States House of Representatives elections in Florida =

United States House of Representatives elections in Florida, 1894
- November 6, 1894

Both of Florida's seats to the United States House of Representatives
	Majority party	Minority party
Party	Democratic	Populist
Last election	2	0
Seats won	2	0
Seat change	Steady	Steady
Popular vote	21,626	4,469
Percentage	82.9%	17.1%

Elections to the United States House of Representatives in Florida were held on November 6, 1894, for two seats in the 54th Congress.

== Background ==
In the previous election, the Republican Party had not run any candidates in Florida, with the Democratic Party having been dominant in the state since 1884. A new party, the People's Party, also known as Populist Party, ran its first candidate that year as the only opposition to the Democrats. The Populists would continue to be the only opposition party to the Democrats in Florida's congressional elections in 1894 as well.

== District 1 ==
Results by county: Sparkman: 50–60%; 60–70%; 70–80%; 80–90%; >90%; McKinnon: 50–60%

Incumbent representative Stephen Mallory II did not seek renomination.

District 1 results
Party	Candidate	Votes	%
Democratic	Stephen M. Sparkman	12,379	85.09%
Populist	D. L. McKinnon	2,135	14.67%
Write-in		34	0.23%
Total votes		14,548	100.0%

== District 2 ==
Results by county: Cooper: 50–60%; 60–70%; 70–80%; 80–90%; >90%; Atkinson: 50–60%

District 2 results
Party	Candidate	Votes	%
Democratic	Charles Merian Cooper (inc.)	9,229	79.58%
Populist	Montholom Atkinson	2,334	20.12%
Write-in		34	0.29%
Total votes		11,597	100.0%

== See also ==
- United States House of Representatives elections, 1894
