= 1902 United States House of Representatives elections =

House elections for the 58th U.S. Congress

- June 2, September 12, September 18, and November 4, 1902 (Note: Regulars only, not including specials)

All 386 seats in the United States House of Representatives 194 seats needed for a majority
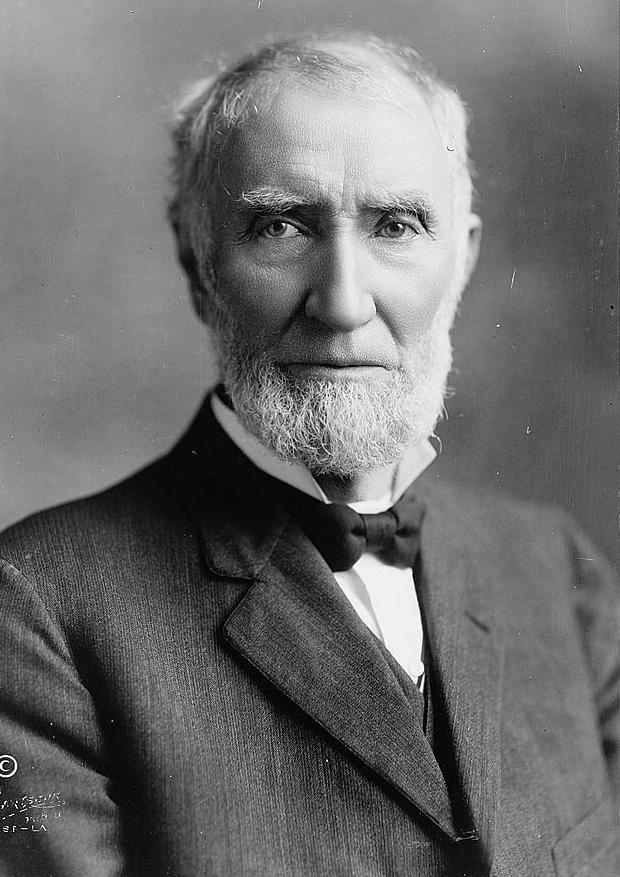

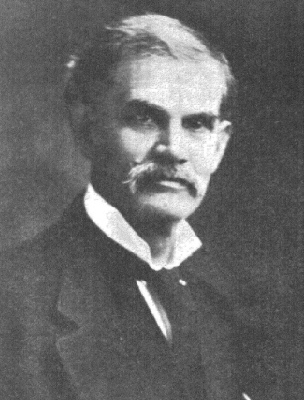
	Majority party	Minority party
Leader	Joseph Cannon	John Sharp Williams
Party	Republican	Democratic
Leader since	March 4, 1903	March 4, 1903
Leader's seat	Illinois 18th	Mississippi 8th
Last election	200 seats	151 seats
Seats before	198 seats (Note: Includes five vacancies.)	152 seats (Note: Includes six vacancies.)
Seats won	206 (Note: Includes three Independent Republicans.)	176
Seat change	▲6	▲25
Popular vote	5,470,468	4,942,208
Percentage	49.81%	45.00%
Swing	▼0.84pp	▲0.55pp
	Third party	Fourth party
Party	Independent	Populist
Last election	0 seats	5 seats
Seats before	0 seats	5 seats
Seats won	4 (Note: Includes 1 "Anti-Machine" candidate.)	0
Seat change	▲4	▼5
Popular vote	61,629	151,192
Percentage	0.56%	1.38%
Swing	▲0.23pp	▼0.97pp
- Results: Democratic gain Republican gain Democratic hold Republican hold Union-Labor gain Independent gain
Speaker before election
David Henderson
Republican
Elected Speaker
Joseph Cannon
Republican

The 1902 United States House of Representatives elections were held for the most part on November 4, 1902, with Oregon, Maine, and Vermont holding theirs early in either June or September. They occurred in the middle of President Theodore Roosevelt's first term, about a year after the assassination of William McKinley in September 1901. Elections were held for 386 seats of the United States House of Representatives, representing 45 states, to serve in the 58th United States Congress.

Due to the increased size of the House and the reapportionment that resulted from the 1900 U.S. census, the Republican Party and the Democratic Party both gained seats simultaneously, which has not occurred in any elections since. The Democrats increased their share of the House, but not by enough to regain control.

With a stable economy and no cornerstone issue, Democratic gains can mostly be linked to the effects of redistricting. Many of the new seats were in areas with high numbers of immigrants (mostly Eastern and Southern European industrial workers, and Northern European farmers), with new immigrants tending to vote Democrat. The Populist Party disappeared from the House, with its supporters almost unanimously switching to the Democratic Party.

This election marked the third and most recent time in American history where the incumbent president's party gained House seats in a midterm election while still losing seats in the Senate, the first two being in 1814 and 1822.

== Election summaries ==
29 new seats were added in reapportionment following the 1900 census. No states lost seats, 16 had no change in apportionment, 14 gained one seat, three gained two seats, and three gained three seats. Two of the states that gained representation elected the new seat at-large.

↓
176	3	207
Democratic	IR	Republican

State	Type	Total seats		Democratic		Republican	
State	Type	Seats	Change	Seats	Change	Seats	Change
Alabama	Districts	9	Steady	9	Steady	0	Steady
Arkansas	Districts	7	▲1	7	▲1	0	Steady
California	Districts	8	▲1	3	▲3	5	▼2
Colorado	District +at-large (Note: Additional seat elected at-large due to Colorado delaying redistricting.)	3 (Note: Election of 1900 saw the election of one Populist.)	▲1	0	Steady	3	▲2 (Note: There was one member of the Silver Republican Party faction elected in 1900, John F. Shafroth. Shafroth attempted to get elected as a Democrat in 1902, but his election was contested and overturned.)
Connecticut	District +at-large	5	▲1	0	Steady	5	▲1
Delaware	At-large	1	Steady	1	▲1	0	▼1
Florida	Districts	3	▲1	3	▲1	0	Steady
Georgia	Districts	11	Steady	11	Steady	0	Steady
Idaho	At-large	1	Steady	0	Steady	1	▲1
Illinois	Districts	25	▲3	8	▼3	17	▲6
Indiana	Districts	13	Steady	4	Steady	9	Steady
Iowa	Districts	11	Steady	1	▲1	10	▼1
Kansas	District +at-large	8	Steady	0	▼1	8	▲1
Kentucky	Districts	11	Steady	10	▲1	1	▼1
Louisiana	Districts	7	▲1	7	▲1	0	Steady
Maine (Note: Elections held early.)	Districts	4	Steady	0	Steady	4	Steady
Maryland	Districts	6	Steady	2	▲2	4	▼2
Massachusetts	Districts	14	▲1	4	▲1	10	Steady
Michigan	Districts	12	Steady	1	▲1	11	▼1
Minnesota	Districts	9	▲2	1	▲1	8	▲1
Mississippi	Districts	8	▲1	8	▲1	0	Steady
Missouri	Districts	16	▲1	15	▲3	1	▼2
Montana	At-large	1	Steady	0	Steady	1	▲1
Nebraska	Districts	6 (Note: Election of 1900 saw the election of two Populists in Nebraska.)	Steady	1	▼1	5	▲3
Nevada	At-large	1	Steady	1	Steady	0	Steady
New Hampshire	Districts	2	Steady	0	Steady	2	Steady
New Jersey	Districts	10	▲2	3	▲1	7	▲1
New York	Districts	37	▲3	17	▲4	20	▼1
North Carolina	Districts	10	▲1	10	▲3	0	▼2
North Dakota	At-large	2	▲1	0	Steady	2	▲1
Ohio	Districts	21	Steady	4	Steady	17	Steady
Oregon	Districts	2	Steady	0	Steady	2	Steady
Pennsylvania	District (Note: At-large seats eliminated in redistricting.)	32	▲2	3	▼1	29	▲3
Rhode Island	Districts	2	Steady	1	▲1	1	▼1
South Carolina	Districts	7	Steady	7	Steady	0	Steady
South Dakota	At-large	2	Steady	0	Steady	2	Steady
Tennessee	Districts	10	Steady	8	Steady	2	Steady
Texas	Districts	16	▲3	16	▲3	0	Steady
Utah	At-large	1	Steady	0	Steady	1	Steady
Vermont	Districts	2	Steady	0	Steady	2	Steady
Virginia	Districts	10	Steady	9	▼1	1	▲1
Washington	At-large	3	▲1	0	Steady	3	▲1
West Virginia	Districts	5	▲1	0	Steady	5	▲1
Wisconsin	Districts	11	▲1	1	▲1	10	Steady
Wyoming	At-large	1	Steady	0	Steady	1	Steady
Total		386	▲29	176 45.6%	▲25	210 54.4%	▲9

Popular vote
Democratic	45.00%
Independent	0.56%
Populist	1.38%
Republican	49.81%
Others	3.25%

House seats
Democratic	45.60%
Independent	1.04%
Republican	53.37%

The previous election had five Populists, but the party completely disappeared from the U.S. House in the 1902 elections.

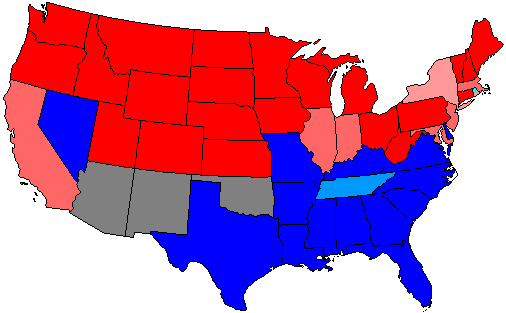
House seats by party holding plurality in state: 80+% to 100% Democratic / 80+% to 100% Republican; 60+% to 80% Democratic / 60+% to 80% Republican; Up to 60% Democratic / Up to 60% Republican

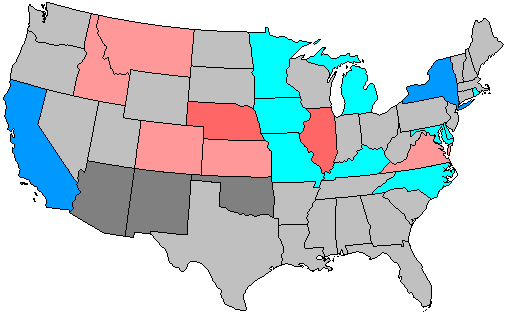
Net gain in party representation: 6+ Democratic gain / 6+ Republican gain; 3–5 Democratic gain / 3–5 Republican gain; 1–2 Democratic gain / 1–2 Republican gain; No net change

== Special elections ==
District	Incumbent			This race	
District	Member	Party	First elected	Results	Candidates
New York 7	Nicholas Muller	Democratic	1876 (retired); 1882 (retired); 1898	Incumbent resigned November 2, 1901. Republican gain.	▌ ✓ Montague Lessler (Republican) 49.87%; ▌Perry Belmont (Democratic) 47.31%; Others: ▌John G. Bennett (Independent) 1.25%; ▌Fritz Linsinger (Ind. Democratic) 0.88%; ▌Isaac Ward (Social Democratic) 0.69%
Pennsylvania 17	Rufus K. Polk	Democratic	1898	Incumbent died March 5, 1902. New member elected November 4, 1902. Democratic hold.	▌ ✓ Alexander Billmeyer (Democratic) 54.69%; ▌William K. Lord (Republican) 45.31%
Kentucky 3	John S. Rhea	Democratic	1896	Election successfully contested. New member seated March 25, 1902. Republican gain.	▌ ✓ J. McKenzie Moss (Republican) 49.84%; ▌John S. Rhea (Democratic) 49.79%; ▌H. S. Glenn (Populist) 0.38%
Massachusetts 6	William Henry Moody	Republican	1894	Incumbent resigned May 1, 1902 to become U.S. secretary of the Navy. New member elected November 4, 1902. Republican hold.	▌ ✓ Augustus P. Gardner (Republican) 52.14%; ▌Samuel Roads Jr. (Democratic) 38.02%; ▌George E. Littlefield (Socialist) 8.73%; ▌Willard O. Wylie (Prohibition) 1.10%; Others 0.01%
Missouri 12	James Joseph Butler	Democratic	1901	Seat declared vacant. Incumbent re-elected November 4, 1902 to finish his term. Special election later successfully contested by George C. R. Wagoner.	▌ ✓ James Joseph Butler (Democratic); ▌George C. R. Wagoner (Republican)
New York 10	Amos J. Cummings	Democratic	1886	Incumbent died May 2, 1902. New member elected November 4, 1902. Democratic hold. Winner not elected to full term; see below.	▌ ✓ Edward Swann (Democratic) 65.62%; ▌Henry Birsell (Republican) 34.38%
Virginia 6	Nicholas Muller	Democratic	1894	Incumbent died May 4, 1902. New member elected November 4, 1902. Democratic hold. Winner also elected to full term; see below.	▌ ✓ Carter Glass (Democratic) 95.5%; ▌James S. Cowden (Ind. Republican) 4.5%
New Jersey 4	Joshua S. Salmon	Democratic	1898	Incumbent died May 6, 1902. New member elected June 18, 1902. Democratic hold.	▌ ✓ De Witt C. Flanagan (Democratic); Unopposed
Texas 3	Reese C. De Graffenreid	Democratic	1896	Incumbent died August 29, 1902. New member elected November 4, 1902. Democratic hold.	▌ ✓ Gordon J. Russell (Democratic); Unopposed
New York 26	George W. Ray	Republican	1882	Incumbent resigned September 11, 1902. New member elected November 4, 1902. Republican hold.	▌ ✓ John W. Dwight (Republican) 62.33%; ▌Charles D. Pratt (Democratic) 37.67%
Texas 4	John L. Sheppard	Democratic	1898	Incumbent died October 11, 1902. New member elected November 15, 1902. Democratic hold.	▌ ✓ Morris Sheppard (Democratic) 86.29%; ▌Frank Lee (Republican) 13.71%
Connecticut 3	Charles A. Russell	Republican	1886	Incumbent died October 23, 1902. New member elected November 4, 1902. Republican hold.	▌ ✓ Frank B. Brandegee (Republican) 94.2%; Scattering 5.8%

== Election dates ==
All the states held their elections November 4, 1902, except for three states, with eight seats among them:

- June 2: Oregon
- September 2: Vermont
- September 8: Maine

== Alabama ==
District	Incumbent			This race	
District	Member	Party	First elected	Results	Candidates
Alabama 1	George W. Taylor	Democratic	1896	Incumbent re-elected.	▌ ✓ George W. Taylor (Democratic) 89.8%; ▌ E. B. Hubbard (Republican) 9.1%
Alabama 2	Ariosto A. Wiley	Democratic	1900	Incumbent re-elected.	▌ ✓ Ariosto A. Wiley (Democratic) 89.9%; ▌ Julius Sternfeld (Republican) 10.1%
Alabama 3	Henry D. Clayton Jr.	Democratic	1896	Incumbent re-elected.	▌ ✓ Henry D. Clayton Jr. (Democratic) 84.1%; ▌ M. W. Carden (Republican) 10.0%; ▌ J. P. Pelham (Republican) 5.9%
Alabama 4	Sydney J. Bowie	Democratic	1900	Incumbent re-elected.	▌ ✓ Sydney J. Bowie (Democratic) 69.3%; ▌ J. A. Edwards (Republican) 30.7%
Alabama 5	C. W. Thompson	Democratic	1900	Incumbent re-elected.	▌ ✓ C. W. Thompson (Democratic) 78.4%; ▌ R. S. Nolen (Republican) 21.6%
Alabama 6	John H. Bankhead	Democratic	1886	Incumbent re-elected.	▌ ✓ John H. Bankhead (Democratic) 72.8%; ▌ William B. Ford (Republican) 27.2%
Alabama 7	John L. Burnett	Democratic	1898	Incumbent re-elected.	▌ ✓ John L. Burnett (Democratic) 52.9%; ▌ O. D. Street (Republican) 45.8%
Alabama 8	William Richardson	Democratic	1900	Incumbent re-elected.	▌ ✓ William Richardson (Democratic) 80.8%; ▌ James Jackson (Republican) 19.2%
Alabama 9	Oscar Underwood	Democratic	1894	Incumbent re-elected.	▌ ✓ Oscar Underwood (Democratic) 77.3%; ▌ J. Clyde Miller (Republican) 20.4%

== Arizona Territory ==
See Non-voting delegates, below.

== Arkansas ==
District	Incumbent			This race	
District	Member	Party	First elected	Results	Candidates
Arkansas 1	Philip D. McCulloch Jr.	Democratic	1892	Incumbent retired. Democratic hold.	▌ ✓ Robert B. Macon (Democratic) 99.8%
Arkansas 2	Stephen Brundidge Jr. Redistricted from the 6th district	Democratic	1896	Incumbent re-elected.	▌ ✓ Stephen Brundidge Jr. (Democratic) 84.1%; ▌ R. S. Coffman (Republican) 15.9%
Arkansas 3	Hugh A. Dinsmore; Redistricted from the 5th district	Democratic	1892	Incumbent re-elected.	▌ ✓ Hugh A. Dinsmore (Democratic) 72.4%; ▌ W. L. McPherson (Republican) 27.6%
Arkansas 4	John S. Little; Redistricted from the 2nd district	Democratic	1894	Incumbent re-elected.	▌ ✓ John S. Little (Democratic) 78.7%; ▌ F. A. Youmans (Republican) 21.3%
Arkansas 5	Charles C. Reid; Redistricted from the 4th district	Democratic	1900	Incumbent re-elected.	▌ ✓ Charles C. Reid (Democratic) 79.6%; ▌ Henry M. Sugg (Republican) 20.4%
Arkansas 6	None (New district)			New district. Democratic gain.	▌ ✓ Joseph T. Robinson (Democratic) 89.3%; ▌ W. H. Carpenter (Republican) 10.7%
Arkansas 7	Thomas C. McRae; Redistricted from the 3rd district	Democratic	1885	Incumbent retired. Democratic hold.	▌ ✓ Robert M. Wallace (Democratic) 83.0%; ▌ R. L Floyd (Republican) 17.0%

== California ==
District	Incumbent			This race	
District	Member	Party	First elected	Results	Candidates
California 1	Samuel D. Woods; Redistricted from the 2nd district	Republican	1900	Incumbent retired. Republican hold.	▌ ✓ James Gillett (Republican) 50.5%; ▌Thomas S. Ford (Democratic) 46.7%; ▌M. E. Shore (Socialist) 1.9%; ▌W. O. Clark (Prohibition) 0.9%
California 2	Frank Coombs; Redistricted from the 1st district	Republican	1900	Incumbent lost re-election. Democratic gain.	▌ ✓ Theodore A. Bell (Democratic) 49.2%; ▌Frank Coombs (Republican) 48.3%; ▌G. H. Rogers (Socialist) 1.7%; ▌W. P. Fassett (Prohibition) 0.8%
California 3	Victor H. Metcalf	Republican	1898	Incumbent re-elected.	▌ ✓ Victor H. Metcalf (Republican) 66.2%; ▌Calvin B. White (Democratic) 27.7%; ▌M. W. Wilkins (Socialist) 5%; ▌T. H. Montgomery (Prohibition) 1.1%
California 4	Julius Kahn	Republican	1898	Incumbent lost re-election. Democratic - Union Labor gain.	▌ ✓ Edward J. Livernash (Democratic - Union Labor) 49.2%; ▌Julius Kahn (Republican) 48.7%; ▌William Costley (Socialist) 1.9%; ▌Joseph Rowell (Prohibition) 0.2%
California 5	Eugene F. Loud	Republican	1890	Incumbent lost re-election. Democratic - Union Labor gain.	▌ ✓ William J. Wynn (Democratic - Union Labor) 56.5%; ▌Eugene F. Loud (Republican) 41.2%; ▌Joseph Lawrence (Socialist) 1.5%; ▌Frank W. Caton (Prohibition) 0.7%
California 6	James C. Needham; Redistricted from the 7th district	Republican	1898	Incumbent re-elected.	▌ ✓ James C. Needham (Republican) 53.5%; ▌Gaston N. Ashe (Democratic) 42.5%; ▌J. L. Cobb (Socialist) 2.5%; ▌L. C. Jolley (Prohibition) 1.4%
California 7	James McLachlan; Redistricted from the 6th district	Republican	1900	Incumbent re-elected.	▌ ✓ James McLachlan (Republican) 64.8%; ▌Carl A. Johnson (Democratic) 27%; ▌George H. Hewes (Socialist) 4.2%; ▌Frederick F. Wheeler (Prohibition) 4%
California 8	None (New district)			New district. Republican gain.	▌ ✓ Milton J. Daniels (Republican) 51.9%; ▌W. E. Smythe (Democratic) 40.8%; ▌Noble A. Richardson (Socialist) 5.4%; ▌Ellsworth Leonardson (Prohibition) 2%

== Colorado ==
District	Incumbent			This race	
District	Member	Party	First elected	Results	Candidates
Colorado 1	John F. Shafroth	Fusion	1894	Incumbent re-elected as a Democrat.	▌ ✓ John F. Shafroth (Democratic) 49.0%; ▌Robert W. Bonynge (Republican) 45.7%; ▌Franklin Moore (Prohibition) 2.2%
Colorado 1	John F. Shafroth	Fusion	1894	Election successfully contested. New member seated February 16, 1904. Republican gain.	▌ ✓ Robert W. Bonynge (Republican); ▌ John F. Shafroth (Democratic); ▌Franklin Moore (Prohibition)
Colorado 2	John C. Bell	Populist	1892	Incumbent lost re-election. Republican gain.	▌ ✓ Herschel M. Hogg (Republican) 47.6%; ▌John C. Bell (Fusion) 45.3%; ▌Wyatt F. Farrar (Socialist) 5.0%; ▌J. B. Lister (Prohibition) 2.0%
Colorado at-large	None (new seat)			New seat. Republican gain.	▌ ✓ Franklin E. Brooks (Republican) 46.1%; ▌Alva Adams (Democratic) 45.6%; ▌ Ida Crouch-Hazlett (Socialist) 4.0%; ▌ Milo Stark (Prohibition) 2.1%; ▌ R. H. Northcott (Populist) 1.5%; ▌ Robert E. Fitzpatrick (Socialist Labor) 0.7%

== Connecticut ==
District	Incumbent			This race	
District	Member	Party	First elected	Results	Candidates
Connecticut 1	E. Stevens Henry	Republican	1894	Incumbent re-elected.	▌ ✓ E. Stevens Henry (Republican) 52.4%; ▌William F. O'Neil (Democratic) 44.4%; Others: ▌Robert W. Jamieson (Socialist) 1.8%; ▌Edward E. Agard (Prohibition) 1.0%; ▌Joseph S. Powell (Soc. Labor) 0.4%
Connecticut 2	Nehemiah D. Sperry	Republican	1894	Incumbent re-elected.	▌ ✓ Nehemiah D. Sperry (Republican) 54.7%; ▌George Morse (Democratic) 41.1%; Others: ▌Cornelius Mahoney (Socialist) 2.6%; ▌Joseph Colbassani (Soc. Labor) 0.9%; ▌Frederic C. Bradley (Prohibition) 0.7%
Connecticut 3	Frank B. Brandegee	Republican	1902 (special)	Incumbent re-elected.	▌ ✓ Frank B. Brandegee (Republican) 58.7%; ▌James H. Potter (Democratic) 39.1%; Others: ▌Charles M. Reed (Prohibition) 1.5%; ▌Henry Dorkin (Socialist) 0.5%; ▌Simon J. Coffey (Soc. Labor) 0.2%
Connecticut 4	Ebenezer J. Hill	Republican	1894	Incumbent re-elected.	▌ ✓ Ebenezer J. Hill (Republican) 54.0%; ▌William D. Bishop (Democratic) 44.2%; Others: ▌George W. Scott (Socialist) 0.9%; ▌Abel S. Beardsley (Prohibition) 0.7%; ▌Emil Singuald (Soc. Labor) 0.2%
Connecticut at-large	None (new seat)			New seat. Republican gain.	▌ ✓ George L. Lilley (Republican) 52.6%; ▌Homer Stille Cummings (Democratic) 44.4%; Others: ▌George A. Sweetland (Socialist) 1.7%; ▌Frederick Platt (Prohibition) 0.9%; ▌Robert J. Kirkpatrick (Soc. Labor) 0.5%

== Delaware ==
District	Incumbent			This race	
District	Member	Party	First elected	Results	Candidates
Delaware at-large	L. Heisler Ball	Republican	1900	Incumbent lost re-election. Democratic gain.	▌ ✓ Henry A. Houston (Democratic) 42.9%; ▌ William Michael Byrne (Union Republican) 34.0%; ▌ L. Heisler Ball (Republican) 21.0%; ▌ George W. Todd (Prohibition) 2.1%

== Florida ==
District	Incumbent			This race	
District	Member	Party	First elected	Results	Candidates
Florida 1	Stephen M. Sparkman	Democratic	1894	Incumbent re-elected.	▌ ✓ Stephen M. Sparkman (Democratic); Unopposed
Florida 2	Robert Wyche Davis	Democratic	1896	Incumbent re-elected.	▌ ✓ Robert Wyche Davis (Democratic); Unopposed
Florida 3	None (New district)			New district. Democratic gain.	▌ ✓ William B. Lamar (Democratic); Unopposed

== Georgia ==
District	Incumbent			This race	
District	Member	Party	First elected	Results	Candidates
Georgia 1	Rufus E. Lester	Democratic	1888	Incumbent re-elected.	▌ ✓ Rufus E. Lester (Democratic) 100%
Georgia 2	James M. Griggs	Democratic	1896	Incumbent re-elected.	▌ ✓ James M. Griggs (Democratic) 100%
Georgia 3	Elijah B. Lewis	Democratic	1896	Incumbent re-elected.	▌ ✓ Elijah B. Lewis (Democratic) 100%
Georgia 4	William C. Adamson	Democratic	1896	Incumbent re-elected.	▌ ✓ William C. Adamson (Democratic) 100%
Georgia 5	Leonidas F. Livingston	Democratic	1890	Incumbent re-elected.	▌ ✓ Leonidas F. Livingston (Democratic) 100%
Georgia 6	Charles L. Bartlett	Democratic	1894	Incumbent re-elected.	▌ ✓ Charles L. Bartlett (Democratic) 100%
Georgia 7	John W. Maddox	Democratic	1892	Incumbent re-elected.	▌ ✓ John W. Maddox (Democratic) 93.2%; ▌ S. J. McKnight (Populist) 6.8%
Georgia 8	William M. Howard	Democratic	1896	Incumbent re-elected.	▌ ✓ William M. Howard (Democratic) 100%
Georgia 9	Farish Tate	Democratic	1892	Incumbent re-elected.	▌ ✓ Farish Tate (Democratic) 99.6%
Georgia 10	William H. Fleming	Democratic	1896	Incumbent lost renomination. Democratic hold.	▌ ✓ Thomas W. Hardwick (Democratic) 100%
Georgia 11	William G. Brantley	Democratic	1896	Incumbent re-elected.	▌ ✓ William G. Brantley (Democratic) 100%

== Hawaii Territory ==
See Non-voting delegates, below.

== Idaho ==
District	Incumbent			This race	
District	Member	Party	First elected	Results	Candidates
Idaho at-large	Thomas L. Glenn	Populist	1900	Incumbent retired. Republican gain.	▌ ✓ Burton L. French (Republican) 54.30%; ▌J. H. Hutchinson (Democratic) 41.72%; ▌John A. Davis (Socialist) 2.91%; ▌Herbert A. Lee (Prohibition) 1.07%

== Illinois ==
District	Incumbent			This race	
District	Member	Party	First elected	Results	Candidates
Illinois 1	None (New district)			New district. Democratic gain.	▌ ✓ Martin Emerich (Democratic) 51.3%; ▌Martin B. Madden (Republican) 47.4%; ▌ Howard T. Wilcoxon (Prohibition) 1.3%
Illinois 2	James Robert Mann; Redistricted from the 1st district	Republican	1896	Incumbent re-elected.	▌ ✓ James Robert Mann (Republican) 60.1%; ▌ Frank Brust (Democratic) 30.6%; ▌ Bernard Berlyn (Socialist) 7.5%; ▌ Charles L. Wakeley (Prohibition) 1.8%
Illinois 3	None (New district)			New district. Republican gain.	▌ ✓ William Warfield Wilson (Republican) 53.5%; ▌ Dan Morgan Smith Jr. (Democratic) 40.3%; ▌ Joshua Wanhope (Socialist) 4.1%; ▌ Freeborn D. Brooke (Prohibition) 2.1%
Illinois 4	George Peter Foster; Redistricted from the 3rd district	Democratic	1898	Incumbent re-elected.	▌ ✓ George Peter Foster (Democratic) 92.6%; ▌ F. Finsterbach (Socialist) 5.4%; ▌ David J. Stewart (Prohibition) 2.0%
Illinois 5	James McAndrews; Redistricted from the 4th district	Democratic	1900	Incumbent re-elected.	▌ ✓ James McAndrews (Democratic) 88.7%; ▌ Jacob Winnen (Socialist) 9.1%; ▌ Charles O. Bassett (Prohibition) 2.2%
Illinois 6	John J. Feely; Redistricted from the 2nd district	Democratic	1900	Incumbent retired. Republican gain.	▌ ✓ William Lorimer (Republican) 49.7%; ▌ Allan C. Durborow Jr. (Democratic) 46.7%; ▌ H. P Kuesch (Socialist) 2.0%; ▌ Eugene W. Chafin (Prohibition) 1.6%
Illinois 7	None (New district)			New district. Republican gain.	▌ ✓ Philip Knopf (Republican) 51.1%; ▌ John M. Hess (Democratic) 37.8%; ▌ James H. Bard (Socialist) 9.8%; ▌ Frederick Ebinger (Prohibition) 1.3%
Illinois 8	William F. Mahoney; Redistricted from the 5th district	Democratic	1900	Incumbent re-elected.	▌ ✓ William F. Mahoney (Democratic) 90.6%; ▌ George D. Evans (Socialist) 7.1%; ▌ Theodore B. Wood (Prohibition) 2.3%
Illinois 9	Henry Sherman Boutell; Redistricted from the 6th district	Republican	1897	Incumbent re-elected.	▌ ✓ Henry Sherman Boutell (Republican) 50.8%; ▌ Lockwood Honoroe (Democratic) 44.1%; ▌ George T. Millar (Socialist) 4.2%; ▌ Andrew J. Lofgren (Prohibition) 0.9%
Illinois 10	George E. Foss; Redistricted from the 7th district	Republican	1894	Incumbent re-elected.	▌ ✓ George E. Foss (Republican) 57.5%; ▌ John J. Philbin (Democratic) 36.6%; ▌ Gus Lohse (Socialist) 3.7%; ▌ Matthew W. Parkhurst (Prohibition) 2.2%
Illinois 11	Albert J. Hopkins; Redistricted from the 8th district	Republican	1885	Incumbent retired to run for US senator. Republican hold.	▌ ✓ Howard M. Snapp (Republican) 64.1%; ▌ James O. Monroe (Democratic) 31.1%; ▌ Schuyler C. Reber (Prohibition) 2.9%; ▌ Charles S. Getting (Socialist) 1.9%
Illinois 12	Walter Reeves; Redistricted from the 12th district	Republican	1894	Incumbent retired. Republican hold.	▌ ✓ Charles Eugene Fuller (Republican) 62.5%; ▌ Julian R. Steward (Democratic) 29.5%; ▌ Frank S. Regan (Prohibition) 8.1%
Illinois 13	Robert R. Hitt; Redistricted from the 9th district	Republican	1882	Incumbent re-elected.	▌ ✓ Robert R. Hitt (Republican) 65.5%; ▌ Louis Dickes (Democratic) 32.0%; ▌ Samuel T. Shirley (Prohibition) 2.5%
Illinois 14	J. Ross Mickey; Redistricted from the 15th district	Democratic	1900	Incumbent retired. Republican gain.	▌ ✓ Benjamin F. Marsh (Republican) 55.9%; ▌ John W. Lusk (Democratic) 38.0%; ▌ R. F. Kindler (Socialist) 3.2%; ▌ Porter M. Carnaham (Prohibition) 2.9%
Illinois 15	George W. Prince; Redistricted from the 10th district	Republican	1895	Incumbent re-elected.	▌ ✓ George W. Prince (Republican) 55.5%; ▌ Jonas W. Olson (Democratic) 40.7%; ▌ J. Hoffman Batten (Prohibition) 2.3%; ▌ Homer Whalen (Socialist) 1.5%
Illinois 16	Joseph V. Graff; Redistricted from the 14th district	Republican	1894	Incumbent re-elected.	▌ ✓ Joseph V. Graff (Republican) 54.5%; ▌ John M. Niehaus (Democratic) 43.9%; ▌ H. H. Peters (Prohibition) 1.6%
Illinois 17	None (New district)			New district. Republican gain.	▌ ✓ John A. Sterling (Republican) 54.4%; ▌ Zoath F. Yost (Democratic) 41.6%; ▌ William W. Houser (Prohibition) 4.0%
Illinois 18	Joseph Gurney Cannon; Redistricted from the 12th district	Republican	1892	Incumbent re-elected.	▌ ✓ Joseph Gurney Cannon (Republican) 58.3%; ▌ Henry C. Bell (Democratic) 38.8%; ▌ Noah J. Wright (Prohibition) 2.9%
Illinois 19	Vespasian Warner; Redistricted from the 13th district	Republican	1894	Incumbent re-elected	▌ ✓ Vespasian Warner (Republican) 53.3%; ▌ Wilbur B. Hinds (Democratic) 43.9%; ▌ H. S. Mavity (Prohibition) 2.8%
Illinois 20	Thomas J. Selby; Redistricted from the 16th district	Democratic	1900	Incumbent retired. Democratic hold.	▌ ✓ Henry T. Rainey (Democratic) 56.5%; ▌ James H. Danskin (Republican) 41.7%; ▌ J. H. Morphis (Prohibition) 1.7%
Illinois 20	Thomas M. Jett; Redistricted from the 18th district	Democratic	1896	Incumbent retired. Democratic loss.	▌ ✓ Henry T. Rainey (Democratic) 56.5%; ▌ James H. Danskin (Republican) 41.7%; ▌ J. H. Morphis (Prohibition) 1.7%
Illinois 21	Ben F. Caldwell; Redistricted from the 17th district	Democratic	1898	Incumbent re-elected	▌ ✓ Ben F. Caldwell (Democratic) 54.0%; ▌ Leroy Anderson (Republican) 44.2%; ▌ J. Jay Dugan (Prohibition) 1.8%
Illinois 22	Fred J. Kern; Redistricted from the 21st district	Democratic	1900	Incumbent lost re-election. Republican gain.	▌ ✓ William A. Rodenberg (Republican) 52.6%; ▌ Fred J. Kern (Democratic) 46.7%; ▌ William W. Cox (Socialist Labor) 0.6%; ▌ Frank Rommerskirchen (Populist) 0.1%
Illinois 23	Joseph B. Crowley; Redistricted from the 19th district	Democratic	1898	Incumbent re-elected	▌ ✓ Joseph B. Crowley (Democratic) 52.4%; ▌ Hiram Gilmore Vansandt (Republican) 44.4%; ▌ William H. Boles (Prohibition) 2.9%; ▌ Dickson T. Harbison (Populist) 0.3%
Illinois 24	James R. Williams; Redistricted from the 20th district	Democratic	1898	Incumbent re-elected.	▌ ✓ James R. Williams (Democratic) 49.5%; ▌ Pleasant T. Chapman (Republican) 48.8%; ▌ William T. Morris (Prohibition) 1.7%
Illinois 25	George Washington Smith; Redistricted from the 22nd district	Republican	1888	Incumbent re-elected.	▌ ✓ George Washington Smith (Republican) 51.9%; ▌ James Lingle (Democratic) 45.5%; ▌ Clark Braden (Prohibition) 2.6%

== Indiana ==
District	Incumbent			This race	
District	Member	Party	First elected	Results	Candidates
Indiana 1	James A. Hemenway	Republican	1894	Incumbent re-elected.	▌ ✓ James A. Hemenway (Republican) 52.0%; ▌ John W. Spencer (Democratic) 43.1%; ▌ Moses Smith (Socialist) 3.5%; ▌ George W. Norman (Prohibition) 1.3%; ▌ Samuel P. Aydelotte (Populist) 0.1%
Indiana 2	Robert W. Miers	Democratic	1896	Incumbent re-elected.	▌ ✓ Robert W. Miers (Democratic) 49.5%; ▌ John C. Chaney (Republican) 47.7%; ▌ Jonathan T. Hobson (Prohibition) 1.5%; ▌ James C. Heenan (Socialist) 0.8%; ▌ William B. Wolfe (Populist) 0.5%
Indiana 3	William T. Zenor	Democratic	1896	Incumbent re-elected.	▌ ✓ William T. Zenor (Democratic) 54.6%; ▌ Edmund A. Maginness (Republican) 44.2%; ▌ Ephraim C. Richardson (Prohibition) 1.2%
Indiana 4	Francis M. Griffith	Democratic	1897	Incumbent re-elected.	▌ ✓ Francis M. Griffith (Democratic) 52.0%; ▌ Joshua M. Spencer (Republican) 45.2%; ▌ Isaac Overman (Prohibition) 2.0%; ▌ Thomas McDonough (Socialist) 0.8%
Indiana 5	Elias S. Holliday	Republican	1900	Incumbent re-elected.	▌ ✓ Elias S. Holliday (Republican) 50.3%; ▌ John A. Wiltermood (Democratic) 45.6%; ▌ Daniel G. Carter (Prohibition) 2.5%; ▌ James Bishop (Socialist) 1.6%
Indiana 6	James E. Watson	Republican	1898	Incumbent re-elected.	▌ ✓ James E. Watson (Republican) 52.9%; ▌ James T. Arbuckle (Democratic) 43.7%; ▌ Mercer Brown (Prohibition) 3.4%
Indiana 7	Jesse Overstreet	Republican	1894	Incumbent re-elected.	▌ ✓ Jesse Overstreet (Republican) 52.0%; ▌ Jacob Piatt Dunn (Democratic) 43.2%; ▌ John R. Henry (Prohibition) 2.3%; ▌ David C. McClure (Socialist) 1.6%; ▌ Ernest Viewegh (Socialist Labor) 0.9%
Indiana 8	George W. Cromer	Republican	1898	Incumbent re-elected.	▌ ✓ George W. Cromer (Republican) 52.0%; ▌ James Edward Truesdale (Democratic) 43.2%; ▌ David F. Kain (Prohibition) 3.7%; ▌ Sebastian Feiser (Socialist) 1.1%
Indiana 9	Charles B. Landis	Republican	1896	Incumbent re-elected.	▌ ✓ Charles B. Landis (Republican) 51.0%; ▌ Lex J. Kirkpatrick (Democratic) 46.0%; ▌ George B. Jones (Prohibition) 3.0%
Indiana 10	Edgar D. Crumpacker	Republican	1896	Incumbent re-elected.	▌ ✓ Edgar D. Crumpacker (Republican) 56.4%; ▌ William Guthrie (Democratic) 42.1%; ▌ Robert M. Delzell (Prohibition) 1.5%
Indiana 11	George Washington Steele	Republican	1894	Incumbent retired. Republican hold.	▌ ✓ Frederick Landis (Republican) 52.6%; ▌ John C. Nelson (Democratic) 42.3%; ▌ Bennet L. Shugart (Prohibition) 5.1%
Indiana 12	James M. Robinson	Democratic	1896	Incumbent re-elected.	▌ ✓ James M. Robinson (Democratic) 48.1%; ▌ Clarence C. Gilhams (Republican) 47.4%; ▌ M. H. Wefel (Socialist) 2.7%; ▌ William W. Wyrick (Prohibition) 1.8%
Indiana 13	Abraham L. Brick	Republican	1898	Incumbent re-elected.	▌ ✓ Abraham L. Brick (Republican) 50.3%; ▌ Frank E. Hering (Democratic) 46.3%; ▌ William R. Lowe (Prohibition) 2.7%; ▌ E. T. Anderson (Socialist) 0.7%

== Iowa ==
District	Incumbent			This race	
District	Member	Party	First elected	Results	Candidates
Iowa 1	Thomas Hedge	Republican	1898	Incumbent re-elected	▌ ✓ Thomas Hedge (Republican) 51.7%; ▌ John E. Craig (Democratic) 45.2%; ▌ W. C. Shepard (Prohibition) 2.1%; ▌ John Lecht (Socialist) 1.0%
Iowa 2	John N. W. Rumple	Republican	1900	Incumbent retired and died before next term. Democratic gain.	▌ ✓ Martin J. Wade (Democratic) 49.6%; ▌ William Hoffman (Republican) 46.7%; ▌ A. K. Gifford (Prohibition) 3.0%; ▌ Francis Bacon (Socialist) 0.7%
Iowa 3	David B. Henderson	Republican	1882	Incumbent renominated but withdrew prior to election. Republican hold.	▌ ✓ Benjamin P. Birdsall (Republican) 54.5%; ▌ Horace Boies (Democratic) 40.9%; ▌ J. A. Earl (Prohibition) 2.7%; ▌ F. A. Lymburner (Socialist) 1.9%
Iowa 4	Gilbert N. Haugen	Republican	1898	Incumbent re-elected.	▌ ✓ Gilbert N. Haugen (Republican) 56.1%; ▌ A. L. Sortor Jr. (Democratic) 41.5%; ▌ D. McGregor (Prohibition) 1.9%; ▌ Frank E. Macha (Socialist) 0.5%
Iowa 5	Robert G. Cousins	Republican	1892	Incumbent re-elected.	▌ ✓ Robert G. Cousins (Republican) 56.5%; ▌ Anthony P. Daly (Democratic) 39.8%; ▌ Malcolm Smith (Prohibition) 2.9%; ▌ A. C. Palmer (Socialist) 0.8%
Iowa 6	John F. Lacey	Republican	1892	Incumbent re-elected.	▌ ✓ John F. Lacey (Republican) 51.2%; ▌ John P. Reese (Democratic) 46.2%; ▌ W. P. Sopher (Populist) 1.5%; ▌ Frank Rice (Socialist) 1.1%
Iowa 7	John A. T. Hull	Republican	1890	Incumbent re-elected.	▌ ✓ John A. T. Hull (Republican) 61.6%; ▌ Parley Sheldon (Democratic) 32.1%; ▌ J. D. O. McFarland (Prohibition) 4.1%; ▌ W. F. Strouder (Socialist) 2.2%
Iowa 8	William P. Hepburn	Republican	1892	Incumbent re-elected.	▌ ✓ William P. Hepburn (Republican) 59.4%; ▌ F. M. Stuart (Democratic) 40.6%
Iowa 9	Walter I. Smith	Republican	1900	Incumbent re-elected.	▌ ✓ Walter I. Smith (Republican) 59.6%; ▌ George W. Cullison (Democratic) 38.7%; ▌ A. D. Beckhart (Prohibition) 1.7%
Iowa 10	James P. Conner	Republican	1900	Incumbent re-elected.	▌ ✓ James P. Conner (Republican) 64.1%; ▌ Kasper Faltison (Democratic) 32.1%; ▌ [FNU] Elwell (Prohibition) 2.5%; ▌ [FNU] Beckhart (Socialist) 1.3%
Iowa 11	Lot Thomas	Republican	1898	Incumbent re-elected.	▌ ✓ Lot Thomas (Republican) 62.4%; ▌ James M. Parsons (Democratic) 36.3%; ▌ John W. Bennett (Socialist) 1.3%

== Kansas ==
District	Incumbent			This race	
District	Member	Party	First elected	Results	Candidates
Kansas 1	Charles Curtis	Republican	1892	Incumbent re-elected.	▌ ✓ Charles Curtis (Republican) 62.8%; ▌ John E. Wagner (Democratic) 36.1%; ▌ C. B. Harmon (Socialist) 1.1%
Kansas 2	Justin De Witt Bowersock	Republican	1898	Incumbent re-elected.	▌ ✓ Justin De Witt Bowersock (Republican) 54.2%; ▌ Noah Bowman (Democratic) 44.2%; ▌ F. A. Byrne (Socialist) 1.6%
Kansas 3	Alfred Metcalf Jackson	Democratic	1900	Incumbent lost re-election. Republican gain.	▌ ✓ Philip P. Campbell (Republican) 53.7%; ▌ Alfred Metcalf Jackson (Democratic) 44.1%; ▌ W. E. Morgan (Socialist) 2.2%
Kansas 4	James Monroe Miller	Republican	1898	Incumbent re-elected.	▌ ✓ James Monroe Miller (Republican) 58.7%; ▌ Thomas H. Grisham (Democratic) 40.5%; ▌ Clarence C. Rolfe (Socialist) 0.8%
Kansas 5	William A. Calderhead	Republican	1898	Incumbent re-elected.	▌ ✓ William A. Calderhead (Republican) 56.5%; ▌ Andrew Sherer (Democratic) 41.6%; ▌ Gus Eckwall (Socialist) 1.9%
Kansas 6	William A. Reeder	Republican	1898	Incumbent re-elected.	▌ ✓ William A. Reeder (Republican) 53.2%; ▌ C. M. Cole (Democratic) 46.0%; ▌ E. M. Reed (Socialist) 0.8%
Kansas 7	Chester I. Long	Republican	1898	Incumbent re-elected but resigned when elected to the US Senate.	▌ ✓ Chester I. Long (Republican) 56.8%; ▌ Vernon J. Rose (Democratic) 42.1%
Kansas at-large	Charles Frederick Scott	Republican	1900	Incumbent re-elected.	▌ ✓ Charles Frederick Scott (Republican) 56.1%; ▌ Jeremiah D. Botkin (Democratic) 40.9%; ▌ L. Matignon (Socialist) 1.5%; ▌ W. H. Ransom (Prohibition) 1.3%; ▌ S. B. Bloomfield (Populist) 0.2%

== Kentucky ==
District	Incumbent			This race	
District	Member	Party	First elected	Results	Candidates
Kentucky 1	Charles K. Wheeler	Democratic	1896	Incumbent retired. Democratic hold.	▌ ✓ Ollie Murray James (Democratic) 66.4%; ▌ C. H. Linn (Republican) 28.5%; ▌ J. D. Kirkpatrick (Prohibition) 5.1%
Kentucky 2	Henry D. Allen	Democratic	1898	Incumbent retired. Democratic hold.	▌ ✓ Augustus Owsley Stanley (Democratic) 52.3%; ▌ Robert W. Slack (Republican) 46.1%; ▌ L. W. Cooper (Prohibition) 1.6%
Kentucky 3	J. McKenzie Moss	Republican	1900	Incumbent lost re-election. Democratic gain.	▌ ✓ John S. Rhea (Democratic) 50.7%; ▌ J. McKenzie Moss (Republican) 48.4%; ▌ G. W. Milligan (Prohibition) 0.9%
Kentucky 4	David Highbaugh Smith	Democratic	1896	Incumbent re-elected.	▌ ✓ David Highbaugh Smith (Democratic) 93.1%; ▌ J. A. Barret (Prohibition) 5.8%
Kentucky 5	Harvey Samuel Irwin	Republican	1900	Incumbent lost re-election. Democratic gain.	▌ ✓ J. Swagar Sherley (Democratic) 50.0%; ▌ Harvey Samuel Irwin (Republican) 44.4%; ▌ Joseph D. Bradburn (United Labor) 3.3%; ▌ J. M. Tydings (Prohibition) 0.9%; ▌ James H. Arnold (Socialist Labor) 0.8%; ▌ F. R. Markert (Socialist) 0.6%
Kentucky 6	Daniel Linn Gooch	Democratic	1900	Incumbent re-elected.	▌ ✓ Daniel Linn Gooch (Democratic) 50.8%; ▌ Leslie T. Applegate (Republican) 40.6%; ▌ G. I. Breill (Socialist) 6.6%; ▌ Jasper Eckler (Prohibition) 1.0%; ▌ Joseph Hermes (Socialist Labor) 1.0%
Kentucky 7	South Trimble	Democratic	1900	Incumbent re-elected.	▌ ✓ South Trimble (Democratic) 59.9%; ▌ W. L. Cannon (Republican) 37.8%; ▌ J. W. Zachary (Prohibition) 2.3%
Kentucky 8	George G. Gilbert	Democratic	1898	Incumbent re-elected.	▌ ✓ George G. Gilbert (Democratic) 53.2%; ▌ Lawson Sumrall (Republican) 45.1%; ▌ William Lowen (Prohibition) 1.7%
Kentucky 9	James N. Kehoe	Democratic	1900	Incumbent re-elected.	▌ ✓ James N. Kehoe (Democratic) 52.4%; ▌ W. H. Castner (Republican) 46.6%; ▌ D. W. Dillon (Prohibition) 1.0%
Kentucky 10	James Bamford White	Democratic	1900	Incumbent retired. Democratic hold.	▌ ✓ Francis A. Hopkins (Democratic) 55.7%; ▌ John G. White (Republican) 43.5%; ▌ F. M. Lang (Prohibition) 0.8%
Kentucky 11	Vincent Boreing	Republican	1898	Incumbent re-elected.	▌ ✓ Vincent Boreing (Republican) 69.2%; ▌ J. P. Harrison (Democratic) 26.1%; ▌ W. S. Stone (Prohibition) 4.5%

== Louisiana ==
District	Incumbent			This race	
District	Member	Party	First elected	Results	Candidates
Louisiana 1	Adolph Meyer	Democratic	1890	Incumbent re-elected.	▌ ✓ Adolph Meyer (Democratic) 81.9%; ▌Oliver S. Livaudais (Republican) 18.1%
Louisiana 2	Robert C. Davey	Democratic	1896	Incumbent re-elected.	▌ ✓ Robert C. Davey (Democratic) 85.2%; ▌ Robert E. Lee (Republican) 14.8%
Louisiana 3	Robert F. Broussard	Democratic	1896	Incumbent re-elected.	▌ ✓ Robert F. Broussard (Democratic) 79.4%; ▌William E. Howell (Republican) 20.6%
Louisiana 4	Phanor Breazeale	Democratic	1898	Incumbent re-elected	▌ ✓ Phanor Breazeale (Democratic) 94.3%; ▌ S. M. Thomas (Republican) 5.7%
Louisiana 5	Joseph E. Ransdell	Democratic	1899	Incumbent re-elected.	▌ ✓ Joseph E. Ransdell (Democratic) 91.9%; ▌Henry B. Taliaferro (Republican) 8.1%
Louisiana 6	Samuel M. Robertson	Democratic	1887	Incumbent re-elected.	▌ ✓ Samuel M. Robertson (Democratic) 75.9%; ▌ Clarence S. Hebert (Republican) 24.1%
Louisiana 7	None (New district)			New district. Democratic gain.	▌ ✓ Arsène Pujo (Democratic) 85.6%; ▌ Gilbert L. Dupre (Republican) 14.4%

== Maine ==
District	Incumbent			This race	
District	Member	Party	First elected	Results	Candidates
Maine 1	Amos L. Allen	Republican	1899	Incumbent re-elected.	▌ ✓ Amos L. Allen (Republican) 58.2%; ▌ Seth C. Gordon (Democratic) 39.8%; ▌ Fred L. Irish (Socialist) 1.9%
Maine 2	Charles E. Littlefield	Republican	1899	Incumbent re-elected	▌ ✓ Charles E. Littlefield (Republican) 58.1%; ▌ Horatio G. Foss (Democratic) 39.5%; ▌ S. B. Martin (Prohibition) 2.4%
Maine 3	Edwin C. Burleigh	Republican	1897	Incumbent re-elected.	▌ ✓ Edwin C. Burleigh (Republican) 64.3%; ▌ Elliot N. Benson (Democratic) 33.1%; ▌ Fred A. Martin (Socialist) 2.6%
Maine 4	Llewellyn Powers	Republican	1901	Incumbent re-elected.	▌ ✓ Llewellyn Powers (Republican) 64.6%; ▌ Thomas White (Democratic) 30.7%; ▌ L. B. Merritt (Prohibition) 4.3%; ▌ G. W. Saunders (Socialist) 0.4%

== Maryland ==
District	Incumbent			This race	
District	Member	Party	First elected	Results	Candidates
Maryland 1	William H. Jackson	Republican	1900	Incumbent re-elected.	▌ ✓ William H. Jackson (Republican) 50.6%; ▌James E. Ellegood (Democratic) 45.5%; ▌R. J. McAllen (Prohibition) 3.9%
Maryland 2	Albert Blakeney	Republican	1900	Incumbent retired. Democratic gain.	▌ ✓ J. Frederick C. Talbott (Democratic) 50.8%; ▌William Tyler Page (Republican) 46.2%; ▌Henry N. Hanna (Prohibition) 3.0%
Maryland 3	Frank C. Wachter	Republican	1898	Incumbent re-elected.	▌ ✓ Frank C. Wachter (Republican) 48.8%; ▌Lee S. Meyer (Democratic) 48.2%; ▌B. F. Lewis (Prohibition) 1.4%; ▌F. Mareck (Socialist) 1.6%
Maryland 4	Charles R. Schirm	Republican	1900	Incumbent lost re-election. Democratic gain.	▌ ✓ James W. Denny (Democratic) 50.0%; ▌Charles R. Schirm (Republican) 48.1%; ▌Andrew J. Church (Prohibition) 1.9%
Maryland 5	Sydney E. Mudd I	Republican	1896	Incumbent re-elected.	▌ ✓ Sydney E. Mudd I (Republican) 56.9%; ▌Benjamin H. Camalier (Democratic) 41.3%; ▌Samuel R. Neave (Prohibition) 1.8%
Maryland 6	George A. Pearre	Republican	1898	Incumbent re-elected	▌ ✓ George A. Pearre (Republican) 53.0%; ▌C. F. Kenneweg (Democratic) 42.8%; ▌J. A. Hopkins (Prohibition) 3.1%

== Massachusetts ==
District	Incumbent			This race	
District	Member	Party	First elected	Results	Candidates
Massachusetts 1	George P. Lawrence	Republican	1897 (special)	Incumbent re-elected.	▌ ✓ George P. Lawrence (Republican) 54.0%; ▌Henry M. Fern (Democratic) 38.1%; ▌Theodore Koehler (Socialist) 4.8%; ▌John Bascom (Prohibition) 3.1%
Massachusetts 2	Frederick H. Gillett	Republican	1892	Incumbent re-elected.	▌ ✓ Frederick H. Gillett (Republican) 58.0%; ▌Arthur F. Nutting (Democratic) 28.9%; ▌George H. Wrenn (Socialist) 11.5%; ▌Lucius E. Parsons (Prohibition) 1.6%
Massachusetts 3	John R. Thayer	Democratic	1898	Incumbent re-elected.	▌ ✓ John R. Thayer (Democratic) 49.1%; ▌Rufus B. Dodge Jr. (Republican) 46.4%; ▌Howard A. Gibbs (Socialist) 3.4%; ▌George H. Bemis (Prohibition) 1.1%
Massachusetts 4	Charles Q. Tirrell	Republican	1900	Incumbent re-elected.	▌ ✓ Charles Q. Tirrell (Republican) 53.4%; ▌Marcus A. Coolidge (Democratic) 36.0%; ▌John F. Mullen (Socialist) 9.3%; ▌Herbert S. Morley (Prohibition) 1.3%
Massachusetts 5	William S. Knox	Republican	1894	Incumbent retired. Republican hold.	▌ ✓ Butler Ames (Republican) 48.4%; ▌John T. Sparks (Democratic) 45.3%; ▌James A. Wilkenson (Socialist) 4.2%; ▌William S. Searle (Prohibition) 1.2%; ▌Joseph Youngjohns (Socialist Labor) 0.9%
Massachusetts 6	William Henry Moody	Republican	1895	Incumbent resigned May 1, 1902 to become U.S. secretary of the Navy. Winner also elected to finish term. Republican hold.	▌ ✓ Augustus P. Gardner (Republican) 51.4%; ▌Samuel Roads Jr. (Democratic) 39.0%; ▌George E. Littlefield (Socialist) 8.5%; ▌Willard O. Wylie (Prohibition) 1.1%
Massachusetts 7	Ernest W. Roberts	Republican	1898	Incumbent re-elected.	▌ ✓ Ernest W. Roberts (Republican) 54.3%; ▌Arthur Lyman (Democratic) 31.2%; ▌William B. Turner (Socialist) 9.7%; ▌Frank B. Jordan (Socialist Labor) 2.8%; ▌George M. Butterick (Prohibition) 2.0%
Massachusetts 8	Samuel W. McCall	Republican	1892	Incumbent re-elected.	▌ ✓ Samuel W. McCall (Republican) 57.6%; ▌Grenville MacFarland (Democratic) 33.9%; ▌Charles W. White (Socialist) 6.2%; ▌Charles A. Johnson (Socialist Labor) 2.3%
Massachusetts 9	Joseph A. Conry	Democratic	1900	Incumbent lost re-election. Citizens Democratic gain.	▌ ✓ John A. Keliher (Citizens Democratic) 38.1%; ▌Joseph A. Conry (Democratic) 37.2%; ▌Charles T. Witt (Republican) 18.8%; ▌James J. McVey (Socialist) 5.8%
Massachusetts 10	Henry F. Naphen	Democratic	1898	Incumbent retired. Democratic hold.	▌ ✓ William S. McNary (Democratic) 54.1%; ▌William W. Towle (Republican) 35.1%; ▌John W. Sherman (Socialist) 10.8%
Massachusetts 11	None (New district)			New district. Democratic gain.	▌ ✓ John Andrew Sullivan (Democratic) 49.4%; ▌Eugene Foss (Republican) 43.8%; ▌George G. Cutting (Socialist) 6.8%
Massachusetts 12	Samuel L. Powers; Redistricted from the 11th district	Republican	1900	Incumbent re-elected.	▌ ✓ Samuel L. Powers (Republican) 52.6%; ▌Frederic Jesup Stimson (Democratic) 36.6%; ▌J. Frank Hayward (Socialist) 9.5%; ▌Napoleon B. Johnson (Prohibition) 1.4%
Massachusetts 13	William S. Greene	Republican	1898 (special)	Incumbent re-elected.	▌ ✓ William S. Greene (Republican) 67.9%; ▌Charles T. Luce (Democratic) 26.2%; ▌Elijah Humphries (Prohibition) 5.9%
Massachusetts 14	William C. Lovering; Redistricted from the 12th district	Republican	1896	Incumbent re-elected.	▌ ✓ William C. Lovering (Republican) 57.3%; ▌Charles A. Gilday (Democratic) 21.7%; ▌Isaac W. Skinner (Socialist) 17.1%; ▌Charles B. Gaffney (Prohibition) 2.0%; ▌Jeremiah Devine (Socialist Labor) 1.8%

== Michigan ==
District	Incumbent			This race	
District	Member	Party	First elected	Results	Candidates
Michigan 1	John Blaisdell Corliss	Republican	1894	Incumbent lost re-election. Democratic gain.	▌ ✓ Alfred Lucking (Democratic) 53.6%; ▌ John Blaisdell Corliss (Republican) 44.9%; ▌ John Sweet (Prohibition) 1.0%; ▌ Herman Richter (Socialist Labor) 0.5%
Michigan 2	Henry C. Smith	Republican	1898	Incumbent lost renomination. Republican hold.	▌ ✓ Charles E. Townsend (Republican) 53.3%; ▌ Frederick B. Wood (Democratic) 44.2%; ▌ Ebenezer R. Bragg (Prohibition) 2.5%
Michigan 3	Washington Gardner	Republican	1898	Incumbent re-elected.	▌ ✓ Washington Gardner (Republican) 56.7%; ▌ Warner J. Sampson (Democratic) 40.0%; ▌ Charles A. Wood (Socialist) 2.7%; ▌ Delavan B. Reed (Prohibition) 0.6%
Michigan 4	Edward L. Hamilton	Republican	1896	Incumbent re-elected.	▌ ✓ Edward L. Hamilton (Republican) 57.1%; ▌ Thomas O'Hara (Democratic) 42.5%; ▌ Edward F. Strickland (Prohibition) 0.4%
Michigan 5	William Alden Smith	Republican	1894	Incumbent re-elected.	▌ ✓ William Alden Smith (Republican) 60.2%; ▌ Myron H. Walker (Democratic) 36.5%; ▌ Edward S. Townsend (Prohibition) 2.4%; ▌ Charles A. Bissonette (Socialist) 0.9%
Michigan 6	Samuel W. Smith	Republican	1896	Incumbent re-elected.	▌ ✓ Samuel W. Smith (Republican) 56.3%; ▌ William H. S. Wood (Democratic) 43.2%; ▌ Ralph W. Le Baron (Prohibition) 0.5%
Michigan 7	Edgar Weeks	Republican	1898	Incumbent lost renomination. Republican hold.	▌ ✓ Henry McMorran (Republican) 57.3%; ▌ Martin Crocker (Democratic) 40.1%; ▌ John Scott (Prohibition) 1.9%; ▌ J. Merritt Lamb (Socialist) 0.7%
Michigan 8	Joseph W. Fordney	Republican	1898	Incumbent re-elected.	▌ ✓ Joseph W. Fordney (Republican) 56.7%; ▌ Henry M. Youmans (Democratic) 37.1%; ▌ J. G. Fischer (Prohibition) 3.3%; ▌ Samuel Hackett (Socialist) 2.9%
Michigan 9	Roswell P. Bishop	Republican	1894	Incumbent re-elected.	▌ ✓ Roswell P. Bishop (Republican) 66.0%; ▌ Daniel W. Goodenough (Democratic) 28.1%; ▌ Edwin S. Palmiter (Prohibition) 4.4%; ▌ David M. Stevens (Socialist) 1.5%
Michigan 10	Henry H. Aplin	Republican	1901	Incumbent lost renomination. Republican hold.	▌ ✓ George A. Loud (Republican) 57.9%; ▌ Michael O'Brien (Democratic) 40.2%; ▌ Louis R. Russell (Prohibition) 1.9%
Michigan 11	Archibald B. Darragh	Republican	1900	Incumbent re-elected.	▌ ✓ Archibald B. Darragh (Republican) 69.7%; ▌ David J. Erwin (Democratic) 30.3%
Michigan 12	Carlos D. Shelden	Republican	1896	Incumbent lost renomination. Republican hold.	▌ ✓ H. Olin Young (Republican) 71.5%; ▌ John Power (Democratic) 28.5%

== Minnesota ==
District	Incumbent			This race	
District	Member	Party	First elected	Results	Candidates
Minnesota 1	James A. Tawney	Republican	1892	Incumbent re-elected.	▌ ✓ James A. Tawney (Republican) 60.9%; ▌Peter McGovern (Democratic) 39.1%
Minnesota 2	James McCleary	Republican	1892	Incumbent re-elected.	▌ ✓ James McCleary (Republican) 63.3%; ▌Charles N. Andrews (Democratic) 36.7%
Minnesota 3	Joel Heatwole	Republican	1894	Incumbent retired. Republican hold.	▌ ✓ Charles Russell Davis (Republican) 58.9%; ▌Charles C. Kolars (Democratic) 38.8%; ▌Charles Blood (Prohibition) 2.3%
Minnesota 4	Frederick Stevens	Republican	1896	Incumbent re-elected.	▌ ✓ Frederick Stevens (Republican) 60.4%; ▌John L. Gieske (Democratic) 39.6%
Minnesota 5	Loren Fletcher	Republican	1892	Incumbent lost re-election. Democratic gain.	▌ ✓ John Lind (Democratic) 51.3%; ▌Loren Fletcher (Republican) 46.0%; Others: ▌Martin Hanson (Socialist Labor) 1.1%; ▌George D. Haggard (Prohibition) 0.9%; ▌Spencer Holman (Social Democratic) 0.6%; ▌Alnson H. Nelson (Populist) 0.2%
Minnesota 6	Page Morris	Republican	1896	Incumbent retired. Republican hold.	▌ ✓ Clarence Buckman (Republican) 56.6%; ▌Julian A. DuBois (Democratic) 43.4%
Minnesota 7	Frank Eddy	Republican	1894	Incumbent retired. Republican hold.	▌ ✓ Andrew Volstead (Republican) 78.5%; ▌August O. Forsberg (Populist) 20.4%; ▌Knut Johnson (Prohibition) 1.1%
Minnesota 8	None (new district)			New seat. Republican gain.	▌ ✓ J. Adam Bede (Republican) 60.8%; ▌Marcus L. Fay (Democratic) 37.0%; ▌Vincent Koneczny (Socialist Labor) 2.2%
Minnesota 9	None (new district)			New seat. Republican gain.	▌ ✓ Halvor Steenerson (Republican) 61.4%; ▌Nels T. Moen (Populist) 23.1%; ▌Alexander McKinnon (Democratic) 15.5%

== Mississippi ==
District	Incumbent			This race	
District	Member	Party	First elected	Results	Candidates
Mississippi 1	Ezekiel S. Candler Jr.	Democratic	1900	Incumbent re-elected.	▌ ✓ Ezekiel S. Candler Jr. (Democratic) 100%
Mississippi 2	Thomas Spight	Democratic	1898 (special)	Incumbent re-elected.	▌ ✓ Thomas Spight (Democratic) 100%
Mississippi 3	Pat Henry	Democratic	1900	Incumbent lost renomination. Democratic hold.	▌ ✓ Benjamin G. Humphreys II (Democratic) 100%
Mississippi 4	Andrew F. Fox	Democratic	1896	Incumbent retired. Democratic hold.	▌ ✓ Wilson S. Hill (Democratic) 100%
Mississippi 5	None (New district)			New district. Democratic gain.	▌ ✓ Adam M. Byrd (Democratic) 100%
Mississippi 6	None (New district)			New district. Democratic gain.	▌ ✓ Eaton J. Bowers (Democratic) 100%
Mississippi 7	Charles E. Hooker	Democratic	1900	Incumbent retired. Democratic loss.	▌ ✓ Frank A. McLain (Democratic) 100%
Mississippi 7	Frank A. McLain; Redistricted from the 6th district.	Democratic	1898 (special)	Incumbent re-elected.	▌ ✓ Frank A. McLain (Democratic) 100%
Mississippi 8	John S. Williams; Redistricted from the 5th district.	Democratic	1892	Incumbent re-elected.	▌ ✓ John S. Williams (Democratic) 100%

== Missouri ==
District	Incumbent			This race	
District	Member	Party	First elected	Results	Candidates
Missouri 1	James T. Lloyd	Democratic	1897	Incumbent re-elected.	▌ ✓ James T. Lloyd (Democratic) 56.2%; ▌ Lee T. Robinson (Republican) 43.6%
Missouri 2	William W. Rucker	Democratic	1898	Incumbent re-elected.	▌ ✓ William W. Rucker (Democratic) 57.6%; ▌ John L. Schmitz (Republican) 42.4%
Missouri 3	John Dougherty	Democratic	1898	Incumbent re-elected.	▌ ✓ John Dougherty (Democratic) 54.2%; ▌ Robert E. Ward (Republican) 45.8%
Missouri 4	Charles F. Cochran	Democratic	1896	Incumbent re-elected.	▌ ✓ Charles F. Cochran (Democratic) 55.9%; ▌ Oswald M. Gilmer (Republican) 44.1%
Missouri 5	William S. Cowherd	Democratic	1896	Incumbent re-elected.	▌ ✓ William S. Cowherd (Democratic) 58.1%; ▌ Robert T. Van Horn (Republican) 40.6%; ▌ Ulysses G. Hughes (Prohibition) 1.0%; ▌ Thomas Wolfe (Allied) 0.2%; ▌ Charles Wellman (Socialist) 0.1%
Missouri 6	David A. De Armond	Democratic	1890	Incumbent re-elected.	▌ ✓ David A. De Armond (Democratic) 54.3%; ▌ Levin W. Shafer (Republican) 45.6%
Missouri 7	James Cooney	Democratic	1896	Incumbent lost renomination. Democratic hold.	▌ ✓ Courtney W. Hamlin (Democratic) 52.7%; ▌ Granville P. Peale (Republican) 47.2%
Missouri 8	Dorsey W. Shackleford	Democratic	1899	Incumbent re-elected.	▌ ✓ Dorsey W. Shackleford (Democratic) 52.4%; ▌ Isaac N. Enloe (Republican) 47.6%
Missouri 9	Champ Clark	Democratic	1896	Incumbent re-elected.	▌ ✓ Champ Clark (Democratic) 55.7%; ▌ Alonzo Tubbs (Republican) 44.3%
Missouri 10	Richard Bartholdt	Republican	1892	Incumbent re-elected.	▌ ✓ Richard Bartholdt (Republican) 55.1%; ▌ Richard T. Blow (Democratic) 39.1%; ▌ William M. Brandt (Socialist) 3.2%; ▌ Charles H. Kunst (Allied) 2.0%; ▌ Charles Grupp (Socialist Labor) 0.6%
Missouri 11	Charles F. Joy	Republican	1894	Incumbent lost re-election. Democratic gain.	▌ ✓ John T. Hunt (Democratic) 57.5%; ▌ Charles F. Joy (Republican) 38.9%; ▌ S. A. McIntire (Socialist) 1.7%; ▌ J. E. Chambers (Allied) 1.5%; ▌ Henry J. Poelling (Socialist Labor) 0.4%
Missouri 12	George C. R. Wagoner	Republican	1900	Incumbent retired. Democratic gain.	▌ ✓ James Joseph Butler (Democratic) 62.5%; ▌ George D. Reynolds (Republican) 35.5%; ▌ Christian Bocker (Socialist) 1.1%; ▌ Henry H. Artz (Allied) 0.8%; ▌ William Billsbarrow (Socialist Labor) 0.1%
Missouri 13	Edward Robb	Democratic	1896	Incumbent re-elected.	▌ ✓ Edward Robb (Democratic) 52.8%; ▌ John H. Raney (Republican) 47.2%
Missouri 14	Willard Duncan Vandiver	Democratic	1896	Incumbent re-elected.	▌ ✓ Willard Duncan Vandiver (Democratic) 54.1%; ▌ H. P. Kinsalving (Republican) 45.7%
Missouri 15	Maecenas E. Benton	Democratic	1896	Incumbent re-elected.	▌ ✓ Maecenas E. Benton (Democratic) 51.0%; ▌ Theodore LaCaff (Republican) 47.1%; ▌ Ernest W. Dow (Prohibition) 1.0%
Missouri 16	None (New district)			New district. Democratic gain.	▌ ✓ J. Robert Lamar (Democratic) 52.0%; ▌ B. F. Russell (Republican) 47.9%

== Montana ==
District	Incumbent			This race	
District	Member	Party	First elected	Results	Candidates
Montana at-large	Caldwell Edwards	Populist	1900	Incumbent retired. Republican gain.	▌ ✓ Joseph M. Dixon (Republican) 46.18%; ▌John M. Evans (Democratic) 36.68%; ▌Martin Dee (Labor) 11.26%; ▌George B. Sproule (Socialist) 5.87%

== Nebraska ==
District	Incumbent			This race	
District	Member	Party	First elected	Results	Candidates
Nebraska 1	Elmer Burkett	Republican	1898	Incumbent re-elected.	▌ ✓ Elmer Burkett (Republican) 56.86%; ▌Howard H. Hanks (Democratic/Populist) 39.90%; ▌Thomas B. Fraser (Prohibition) 1.99%; ▌Christ Christensen (Socialist) 1.25%
Nebraska 2	David H. Mercer	Republican	1892	Incumbent lost re-election. Democratic gain.	▌ ✓ Gilbert Hitchcock (Democratic/Populist) 50.87%; ▌David H. Mercer (Republican) 43.94%; ▌Bernard McCaffery (Socialist) 5.19%
Nebraska 3	John S. Robinson	Democratic	1898	Incumbent lost re-election. Republican gain.	▌ ✓ John McCarthy (Republican) 50.04%; ▌John S. Robinson (Democratic/Populist) 48.32%; ▌Isaiah Lightner (Prohibition) 1.65%
Nebraska 4	William L. Stark	Populist	1896	Incumbent lost re-election. Republican gain.	▌ ✓ Edmund H. Hinshaw (Republican) 52.38%; ▌William L. Stark (Populist/Democratic) 45.61%; ▌Benjamin F. Farley (Prohibition) 2.01%
Nebraska 5	Ashton C. Shallenberger	Democratic	1900	Incumbent lost re-election. Republican gain.	▌ ✓ George W. Norris (Republican) 49.48%; ▌Ashton C. Shallenberger (Democratic/Populist) 48.88%; ▌John D. Stoddard (Prohibition) 1.64%
Nebraska 6	William Neville	Populist	1899 (special)	Incumbent retired. Republican gain.	▌ ✓ Moses Kinkaid (Republican) 52.48%; ▌Patrick H. Barry (Democratic/Populist) 43.99%; ▌C. F. Swander (Prohibition) 2.07%; ▌J. C. Wisely (Socialist) 1.46%

== Nevada ==
District	Incumbent			This race	
District	Member	Party	First elected	Results	Candidates
Nevada at-large	Francis G. Newlands	Democratic	1892	Incumbent retired to run for U.S. senator. Democratic hold.	▌ ✓ Clarence D. Van Duzer (Democratic/Silver) 53.6%; ▌ Edward S. Farrington (Republican) 46.5%

== New Hampshire ==
District	Incumbent			This race	
District	Member	Party	First elected	Results	Candidates
New Hampshire 1	Cyrus A. Sulloway	Republican	1894	Incumbent re-elected.	▌ ✓ Cyrus A. Sulloway (Republican) 58.0%; ▌ Albert S. Langley (Democratic) 39.2%; ▌ Edgar L. Carr (Prohibition) 1.4%
New Hampshire 2	Frank D. Currier	Republican	1900	Incumbent re-elected.	▌ ✓ Frank D. Currier (Republican) 58.0%; ▌ George E. Bales (Democratic) 39.2%; ▌ Charles H. Thorndike (Prohibition) 1.6%; ▌ James S. Murray (Socialist) 1.1%; ▌ David J. Driscoll (Allied People's) 0.1%

== New Jersey ==
District	Incumbent			This race	
District	Member	Party	First elected	Results	Candidates
New Jersey 1	Henry C. Loudenslager	Republican	1892	Incumbent re-elected.	▌ ✓ Henry C. Loudenslager (Republican) 55.4%; ▌ Richard T. Miller (Democratic) 41.6%; ▌ Robert T. Seagrave (Prohibition) 3.0%
New Jersey 2	John J. Gardner	Republican	1892	Incumbent re-elected.	▌ ✓ John J. Gardner (Republican) 62.5%; ▌ Thomas A. Gash (Democratic) 29.6%; ▌ Marion R. Owen (Prohibition) 7.3%; ▌ Daniel W. Davis (Socialist Labor) 0.6%
New Jersey 3	Benjamin F. Howell	Republican	1894	Incumbent re-elected.	▌ ✓ Benjamin F. Howell (Republican) 51.4%; ▌ Jacob A. Geisenhainer (Democratic) 47.2%; ▌ Robert Bruce Crowell (Prohibition) 1.4%
New Jersey 4	None (New district)			New district. Republican gain.	▌ ✓ William M. Lanning (Republican) 51.4%; ▌ Lewis Perrine (Democratic) 46.0%; ▌ William Lunger (Prohibition) 1.6%; ▌ W. H. Wooton (Socialist) 1.0%
New Jersey 5	Charles N. Fowler; Redistricted from the 8th district	Republican	1894	Incumbent re-elected.	▌ ✓ Charles N. Fowler (Republican) 49.6%; ▌ De Witt C. Flanagan (Democratic) 46.8%; ▌ Joel G. Van Cise (Prohibition) 2.1%; ▌ J. M. Beaman (Socialist) 1.0%; ▌ J. Grieb (Socialist Labor) 0.5%
New Jersey 5	De Witt C. Flanagan; Redistricted from the 4th district	Democratic	1902	Incumbent lost re-election. Democratic loss.	▌ ✓ Charles N. Fowler (Republican) 49.6%; ▌ De Witt C. Flanagan (Democratic) 46.8%; ▌ Joel G. Van Cise (Prohibition) 2.1%; ▌ J. M. Beaman (Socialist) 1.0%; ▌ J. Grieb (Socialist Labor) 0.5%
New Jersey 6	James F. Stewart; Redistricted from the 5th district	Republican	1894	Incumbent lost renomination. Democratic gain.	▌ ✓ William Hughes (Democratic) 52.4%; ▌ William Barbour (Republican) 44.0%; ▌ W. H. Wyatt (Socialist) 1.8%; ▌ Robert H. Richards (Prohibition) 0.9%; ▌ Louis Magnet (Socialist Labor) 0.9%
New Jersey 7	Richard W. Parker; Redistricted from the 6th district	Republican	1894	Incumbent re-elected.	▌ ✓ Richard W. Parker (Republican) 56.6%; ▌ George A. Miller (Democratic) 40.9%; ▌ F. C. Dey (Socialist) 1.0%; ▌ William Walker (Socialist Labor) 0.8%; ▌ Edmund L. Roff (Prohibition) 0.7%
New Jersey 8	None (New district)			New district. Republican gain.	▌ ✓ William H. Wiley (Republican) 59.3%; ▌ Henry G. Atwater (Democratic) 37.8%; ▌ J. E. Billings (Socialist) 2.3%; ▌ John Berryman (Prohibition) 0.6%
New Jersey 9	None (New district)			New district. Democratic gain.	▌ ✓ Allan Benny (Democratic) 49.1%; ▌ Robert Carey (Republican) 46.4%; ▌ A. R. Hopkins (Socialist) 2.7%; ▌ T. P. Herrschaft (Socialist Labor) 1.3%; ▌ James Parker (Prohibition) 0.5%
New Jersey 10	Allan L. McDermott; Redistricted from the 7th district	Democratic	1900	Incumbent re-elected.	▌ ✓ Allan L. McDermott (Democratic) 61.6%; ▌ James D. Manning (Republican) 33.8%; ▌ Frederick Kraft (Socialist) 2.8%; ▌ C. Marquelin (Socialist Labor) 1.7%; ▌ R. B. Artz (Prohibition) 0.1%

== New Mexico Territory ==
See Non-voting delegates, below.

== New York ==
District	Incumbent			This race	
District	Member	Party	First elected	Results	Candidates
New York 1	Frederic Storm	Republican	1900	Incumbent lost re-election. Democratic gain.	▌ ✓ Townsend Scudder (Democratic) 49.8%; ▌ Frederic Storm (Republican) 49.5%; ▌ Frank Bessen (Social Democratic) 0.7%
New York 2	George H. Lindsay; Redistricted from the 6th district	Democratic	1900	Incumbent re-elected.	▌ ✓ George H. Lindsay (Democratic) 61.9%; ▌ James R. Howe (Republican) 31.7%; ▌ George Stammer (Social Democratic) 3.3%; ▌ Isaac Bookman (Socialist Labor) 2.7%; ▌ William Irvine (Prohibition) 0.4%
New York 3	None (new district)			New seat. Republican gain.	▌ ✓ Charles T. Dunwell (Republican) 48.3%; ▌ Hugh E. Rogers (Democratic) 47.2%; ▌ Henry Jander (Social Democratic) 2.6%; ▌ Henry Kober (Socialist Labor) 1.5%; ▌ George M. Mather (Prohibition) 0.4%
New York 4	Frank E. Wilson; Redistricted from the 5th district	Democratic	1898	Incumbent re-elected.	▌ ✓ Frank E. Wilson (Democratic) 50.9%; ▌ William Schnitzspan (Republican) 42.5%; ▌ William A. Heide (Social Democratic) 4.2%; ▌ Emil Mueller (Socialist Labor) 2.0%; ▌ Henry T. Hinsch (Prohibition) 0.4%
New York 5	Harry A. Hanbury; Redistricted from the 4th district	Republican	1900	Incumbent lost re-election. Democratic gain.	▌ ✓ Edward Bassett (Democratic) 48.8%; ▌ Harry A. Hanbury (Republican) 46.0%; ▌ Elmer S. White (Liberty Bell Democratic) 2.7%; ▌ Peter E. Burrows (Social Democratic) 1.1%; ▌ Justus Ebert (Socialist Labor) 1.0%; ▌ Robert T. Stokes (Prohibition) 0.4%
New York 6	Henry Bristow; Redistricted from the 3rd district	Republican	1900	Incumbent lost re-election. Democratic gain.	▌ ✓ Robert Baker (Democratic) 49.5%; ▌ Henry Bristow (Republican) 48.2%; ▌ Hugo Peters (Social Democratic) 1.0%; ▌ Frederick A. Leise (Socialist Labor) 0.9%; ▌ Adolph C. Carlson (Prohibition) 0.4%
New York 7	John J. Fitzgerald; Redistricted from the 2nd district	Democratic	1898	Incumbent re-elected.	▌ ✓ John J. Fitzgerald (Democratic) 67.5%; ▌ James T. Williamson (Republican) 30.5%; ▌ Bernard Hughes (Socialist Labor) 0.8%; ▌ Peter Larsen (Social Democratic) 0.8%; ▌ George W. Hunt (Prohibition) 0.4%
New York 8	Montague Lessler; Redistricted from the 7th district	Republican	1902	Incumbent lost re-election. Democratic gain.	▌ ✓ Timothy Sullivan (Democratic) 69.4%; ▌ Montague Lessler (Republican) 27.6%; ▌ Gustave Theimer (Social Democratic) 1.3%; ▌ Robert Downs (Socialist Labor) 1.1%; ▌ Benjamin F. Funk (Prohibition) 0.4%; ▌ Frank Mayo (Liberal Democratic) 0.2%
New York 8	Thomas J. Creamer	Democratic	1900	Incumbent retired. Democratic loss.	▌ ✓ Timothy Sullivan (Democratic) 69.4%; ▌ Montague Lessler (Republican) 27.6%; ▌ Gustave Theimer (Social Democratic) 1.3%; ▌ Robert Downs (Socialist Labor) 1.1%; ▌ Benjamin F. Funk (Prohibition) 0.4%; ▌ Frank Mayo (Liberal Democratic) 0.2%
New York 9	Henry M. Goldfogle	Democratic	1900	Incumbent re-elected.	▌ ✓ Henry M. Goldfogle (Democratic) 55.6%; ▌ Charles S. Adler (Republican) 30.5%; ▌ Alexander Jonas (Social Democratic) 9.7%; ▌ Rudolph Katz (Socialist Labor) 3.6%; ▌ Timothy N. Holden (Prohibition) 0.6%
New York 10	William Sulzer; Redistricted from the 11th district	Democratic	1894	Incumbent re-elected.	▌ ✓ William Sulzer (Democratic) 62.2%; ▌ William Blaur (Republican) 24.5%; ▌ H. Gaylord Wilshire (Social Democratic) 7.5%; ▌ James T. Hunter (Socialist Labor) 5.6%; ▌ Ira Babcock (Prohibition) 0.2%
New York 11	None (new district)			New seat. Democratic gain.	▌ ✓ William Randolph Hearst (Democratic) 69.1%; ▌ Henry Birrell (Republican) 27.8%; ▌ Solomon Feldman (Social Democratic) 1.7%; ▌ Charles G. Teche (Socialist Labor) 1.1%; ▌ Edward A. Packer (Prohibition) 0.3%
New York 12	George B. McClellan Jr.	Democratic	1894	Incumbent re-elected.	▌ ✓ George B. McClellan Jr. (Democratic) 71.1%; ▌ Charles Shongood (Republican) 23.5%; ▌ Fred Paulitsch (Social Democratic) 3.3%; ▌ Emil Hendricks (Socialist Labor) 1.7%; ▌ August J. Durlacher (Liberal Democratic) 0.2%; ▌ John W. Andrews (Prohibition) 0.2%
New York 13	Edward Swann; Redistricted from the 10th district	Democratic	1902	Incumbent retired. Democratic hold.	▌ ✓ Francis Burton Harrison (Democratic) 51.7%; ▌ James W. Perry (Republican) 46.5%; ▌ Peter Zoeler (Social Democratic) 0.7%; ▌ Andreas H. Knudson (Socialist Labor) 0.6%; ▌ James H. Yarnell (Prohibition) 0.3%; ▌ Francis M. Neall (Liberal Democratic) 0.2%
New York 13	Oliver Belmont	Democratic	1900	Incumbent retired. Democratic loss.	▌ ✓ Francis Burton Harrison (Democratic) 51.7%; ▌ James W. Perry (Republican) 46.5%; ▌ Peter Zoeler (Social Democratic) 0.7%; ▌ Andreas H. Knudson (Socialist Labor) 0.6%; ▌ James H. Yarnell (Prohibition) 0.3%; ▌ Francis M. Neall (Liberal Democratic) 0.2%
New York 14	None (new district)			New seat. Democratic gain.	▌ ✓ Ira E. Rider (Democratic) 63.7%; ▌ Andrew J. Anderson (Republican) 26.5%; ▌ William Ehret (Social Democratic) 7.3%; ▌ Arthur Chambers (Socialist Labor) 2.0%; ▌ John J. M. Issing (Liberty Bell Democratic) 0.2%; ▌ John C. Wallace (Prohibition) 0.2%
New York 15	William H. Douglas; Redistricted from the 14th district	Republican	1900	Incumbent re-elected.	▌ ✓ William H. Douglas (Republican) 49.8%; ▌ Henry B. Martin (Democratic) 48.2%; ▌ Edward F. Cassidy (Social Democratic) 1.1%; ▌ Robert J. McCall (Socialist Labor) 0.7%; ▌ David A. Howell (Prohibition) 0.2%
New York 16	Jacob Ruppert; Redistricted from the 15th district	Democratic	1898	Incumbent re-elected.	▌ ✓ Jacob Ruppert (Democratic) 62.5%; ▌ William R. Spooner (Republican) 29.9%; ▌ Herman Walker (Social Democratic) 4.5%; ▌ Charles Vonderlieth (Socialist Labor) 2.7%; ▌ Robert E. Neidig (Prohibition) 0.4%
New York 17	None (new district)			New seat. Democratic gain.	▌ ✓ Francis Emanuel Shober (Democratic) 50.6%; ▌ Harvey T. Andrews (Republican) 46.6%; ▌ James G. Kanely (Social Democratic) 1.4%; ▌ Niles Johnson (Socialist Labor) 1.0%; ▌ George Gethin (Prohibition) 0.4%
New York 18	None (new district)			New seat. Democratic gain.	▌ ✓ Joseph A. Goulden (Democratic) 61.8%; ▌ Frank C. Schaeffler (Republican) 32.3%; ▌ Ernest Spranger (Social Democratic) 3.9%; ▌ Frederick H. Olpp (Socialist Labor) 1.7%; ▌ James H. Hardy (Prohibition) 0.3%
New York 19	Cornelius Amory Pugsley; Redistricted from the 16th district	Democratic	1900	Incumbent lost re-election. Republican gain.	▌ ✓ Norton P. Otis (Republican) 48.7%; ▌ Cornelius Amory Pugsley (Democratic) 47.2%; ▌ William T. Wood (Social Democratic) 1.8%; ▌ Owen Carraher (Socialist Labor) 1.5%; ▌ Menzo C. Beardsley (Prohibition) 0.8%
New York 20	Arthur S. Tompkins; Redistricted from the 17th district	Republican	1898	Incumbent retired Republican hold.	▌ ✓ Thomas W. Bradley (Republican) 55.5%; ▌ Theodore H. Babcock (Democratic) 41.8%; ▌ John Anthony (Prohibition) 1.6%; ▌ Edward A. Gidley (Socialist Labor) 0.6%; ▌ Beaumont Sykes (Social Democratic) 0.6%
New York 21	John H. Ketcham; Redistricted from the 18th district	Republican	1896	Incumbent re-elected.	▌ ✓ John H. Ketcham (Republican) 57.3%; ▌ Curtis F. Hoag (Democratic) 40.4%; ▌ Lester Howard (Prohibition) 2.0%; ▌ Andrew C. Fancher (Social Democratic) 0.3%
New York 22	William H. Draper; Redistricted from the 19th district	Republican	1900	Incumbent re-elected.	▌ ✓ William H. Draper (Republican) 57.5%; ▌ John H. Morrison (Democratic) 41.6%; ▌ Carl H. Caspar (Social Democratic) 0.9%
New York 23	George N. Southwick; Redistricted from the 20th district	Republican	1900	Incumbent re-elected.	▌ ✓ George N. Southwick (Republican) 55.2%; ▌ R. Cleveland Sloan (Democratic) 42.9%; ▌ Jacob E. Alexander (Socialist Labor) 1.4%; ▌ Henry O. Vitalius (Social Democratic) 0.5%
New York 24	None (new district)			New seat. Republican gain.	▌ ✓ George J. Smith (Republican) 55.8%; ▌ Clifford Champion (Democratic) 41.7%; ▌ Ira S. Jarvis (Prohibition) 2.5%
New York 25	Lucius Littauer; Redistricted from the 22nd district	Republican	1896	Incumbent re-elected.	▌ ✓ Lucius Littauer (Republican) 55.1%; ▌ Frank Beebe (Democratic) 43.4%; ▌ Leo R. Grinnell (Social Democratic) 1.5%
New York 25	John Knox Stewart; Redistricted from the 21st district	Republican	1898	Incumbent retired. Republican loss.	▌ ✓ Lucius Littauer (Republican) 55.1%; ▌ Frank Beebe (Democratic) 43.4%; ▌ Leo R. Grinnell (Social Democratic) 1.5%
New York 25	Louis W. Emerson; Redistricted from the 23rd district	Republican	1898	Incumbent retired. Republican loss.	▌ ✓ Lucius Littauer (Republican) 55.1%; ▌ Frank Beebe (Democratic) 43.4%; ▌ Leo R. Grinnell (Social Democratic) 1.5%
New York 26	None (new district)			New seat. Republican gain.	▌ ✓ William H. Flack (Republican) 70.8%; ▌ Henry Holland (Democratic) 26.4%; ▌ Henry C. Shares (Prohibition) 2.5%; ▌ Isaac Peyser (Social Democratic) 0.3%
New York 27	James S. Sherman; Redistricted from the 25th district	Republican	1892	Incumbent re-elected.	▌ ✓ James S. Sherman (Republican) 52.4%; ▌ Edward Lewis (Democratic) 44.5%; ▌ Seth H. Warner (Prohibition) 3.1%
New York 28	Charles L. Knapp; Redistricted from the 24th district	Republican	1900	Incumbent re-elected.	▌ ✓ Charles L. Knapp (Republican) 58.9%; ▌ C. Frank Smith (Democratic) 37.8%; ▌ Charles W. Richards (Prohibition) 3.2%
New York 29	Michael E. Driscoll; Redistricted from the 27th district	Republican	1898	Incumbent re-elected.	▌ ✓ Michael E. Driscoll (Republican) 60.1%; ▌ Martin F. Dillon (Democratic) 36.3%; ▌ Albert J. Cort (Prohibition) 1.7%; ▌ James A. Trainor (Socialist Labor) 1.0%; ▌ John L. Franz (Social Democratic) 0.9%
New York 30	John W. Dwight; Redistricted from the 26th district	Republican	1902	Incumbent re-elected.	▌ ✓ John W. Dwight (Republican) 62.2%; ▌ Charles D. Pratt (Democratic) 37.8%
New York 31	Sereno E. Payne; Redistricted from the 28th district	Republican	1889	Incumbent re-elected.	▌ ✓ Sereno E. Payne (Republican) 60.1%; ▌ Harry B. Harpending (Democratic) 37.0%; ▌ Harrison L. Hoyt (Prohibition) 2.3%; ▌ Frank L. Brannick (Socialist Labor) 0.6%
New York 32	James Breck Perkins; Redistricted from the 31st district	Republican	1900	Incumbent re-elected.	▌ ✓ James Breck Perkins (Republican) 52.5%; ▌ William DeGraff (Democratic) 37.8%; ▌ Charles R. Bach (Social Democratic) 5.3%; ▌ Freeman H. Bettys (Prohibition) 2.2%; ▌ Henry Engel (Socialist Labor) 2.1%
New York 33	Charles W. Gillet; Redistricted from the 29th district	Republican	1892	Incumbent re-elected.	▌ ✓ Charles W. Gillet (Republican) 54.5%; ▌ Frank P. Frost (Democratic) 41.7%; ▌ William A. Allen (Prohibition) 3.9%
New York 34	James W. Wadsworth; Redistricted from the 30th district	Republican	1890	Incumbent re-elected.	▌ ✓ James W. Wadsworth (Republican) 56.2%; ▌ Dean F. Currie (Democratic) 40.6%; ▌ William E. Booth (Prohibition) 3.2%
New York 35	William H. Ryan; Redistricted from the 32nd district	Democratic	1898	Incumbent re-elected.	▌ ✓ William H. Ryan (Democratic) 55.3%; ▌ John McCreath Farquhar (Republican) 40.9%; ▌ William S. Patterson (Socialist Labor) 2.0%; ▌ Theodore E. Schorr (Social Democratic) 1.0%; ▌ Elijah J. Cook (Prohibition) 0.8%
New York 36	De Alva S. Alexander; Redistricted from the 33rd district	Republican	1896	Incumbent re-elected.	▌ ✓ De Alva S. Alexander (Republican) 55.9%; ▌ Ole L. Snyder (Democratic) 41.6%; ▌ Thomas Tomlinson (Prohibition) 1.4%; ▌ William F. Rohloff (Socialist Labor) 0.7%; ▌ Tom Fitten (Social Democratic) 0.4%
New York 37	Edward B. Vreeland; Redistricted from the 34th district	Republican	1899	Incumbent re-elected.	▌ ✓ Edward B. Vreeland (Republican) 67.8%; ▌ George J. Ball (Democratic) 28.2%; ▌ William J. Hoyt (Prohibition) 4.0%

== North Carolina ==
District	Incumbent			This race	
District	Member	Party	First elected	Results	Candidates
North Carolina 1	John H. Small	Democratic	1898	Incumbent re-elected.	▌ ✓ John H. Small (Democratic) 88.5%; ▌ Henry E. Hodges (Republican) 11.5%
North Carolina 2	Claude Kitchin	Democratic	1900	Incumbent re-elected.	▌ ✓ Claude Kitchin (Democratic) 99.0%; ▌ Scotland Harris (Republican) 1.0%
North Carolina 3	Charles R. Thomas	Democratic	1898	Incumbent re-elected.	▌ ✓ Charles R. Thomas (Democratic) 71.0%; ▌ George E. Butler (Republican) 29.0%
North Carolina 4	Edward W. Pou	Democratic	1900	Incumbent re-elected.	▌ ✓ Edward W. Pou (Democratic) 82.7%; ▌ John W. Atwater (Independent) 12.6%
North Carolina 5	William Walton Kitchin	Democratic	1896	Incumbent re-elected.	▌ ✓ William Walton Kitchin (Democratic) 65.3%; ▌ J. Lindsay Patterson (Independent) 34.7%
North Carolina 6	John D. Bellamy	Democratic	1898	Incumbent lost renomination. Democratic hold.	▌ ✓ Gilbert B. Patterson (Democratic) 69.1%; ▌ Albert H. Slocumb (Republican) 30.9%
North Carolina 7	None (New district)			New district. Democratic gain.	▌ ✓ Robert N. Page (Democratic) 83.5%; ▌ Edwin H. Morris (Republican) 15.6%; ▌ William C. Wilcox (Populist) 0.9%
North Carolina 8	Theodore F. Kluttz; Redistricted from the 7th district	Democratic	1898	Incumbent re-elected.	▌ ✓ Theodore F. Kluttz (Democratic) 52.4%; ▌ E. Spencer Blackburn (Republican) 47.4%; ▌ J. W. Long (Prohibition) 0.2%
North Carolina 8	E. Spencer Blackburn	Republican	1900	Incumbent lost re-election. Republican loss.	▌ ✓ Theodore F. Kluttz (Democratic) 52.4%; ▌ E. Spencer Blackburn (Republican) 47.4%; ▌ J. W. Long (Prohibition) 0.2%
North Carolina 9	None (New district)			New district. Democratic gain.	▌ ✓ E. Yates Webb (Democratic) 61.6%; ▌ G. B. Hiss (Republican) 38.4%
North Carolina 10	James M. Moody; Redistricted from the 9th district	Republican	1900	Incumbent lost re-election and died before end of term. Democratic gain.	▌ ✓ James M. Gudger Jr. (Democratic) 50.4%; ▌ James M. Moody (Republican) 49.6%

== North Dakota ==
District	Incumbent			This race	
District	Member	Party	First elected	Results	Candidates
North Dakota at-large 2 seats on a general ticket	Thomas F. Marshall	Republican	1900	Incumbent re-elected.	▌ ✓ Thomas F. Marshall (Republican) 34.29%; ▌ ✓ Burleigh F. Spalding (Republican) 34.16%; ▌Lars A. Ueland (Democratic) 15.35%; ▌Verner E. Lovell (Democratic) 14.96%; ▌Royal F. King (Socialist) 1.24%
North Dakota at-large 2 seats on a general ticket	None (new seat)			New seat. Republican gain.	▌ ✓ Thomas F. Marshall (Republican) 34.29%; ▌ ✓ Burleigh F. Spalding (Republican) 34.16%; ▌Lars A. Ueland (Democratic) 15.35%; ▌Verner E. Lovell (Democratic) 14.96%; ▌Royal F. King (Socialist) 1.24%

== Ohio ==
District	Incumbent			This race	
District	Member	Party	First elected	Results	Candidates
Ohio 1	William B. Shattuc	Republican	1896	Incumbent retired. Republican hold.	▌ ✓ Nicholas Longworth (Republican) 67.9%; ▌ Thomas H. Bentham (Democratic) 26.7%; ▌ C. E. Irwin (Socialist) 4.9%; ▌ William O. Johnson (Prohibition) 0.5%
Ohio 2	Jacob H. Bromwell	Republican	1894	Incumbent retired. Republican hold.	▌ ✓ Herman P. Goebel (Republican) 61.8%; ▌ Harry C. Busch (Democratic) 30.8%; ▌ William R. Fox (Socialist) 6.8%; ▌ Albert R. Pugh (Prohibition) 0.5%
Ohio 3	Robert M. Nevin	Republican	1900	Incumbent re-elected.	▌ ✓ Robert M. Nevin (Republican) 52.8%; ▌ Thomas A. Selz (Democratic) 40.6%; ▌ Jacob Hemler (Socialist) 4.9%; ▌ James C. Upfold (Prohibition) 1.6%
Ohio 4	Robert B. Gordon	Democratic	1898	Incumbent retired. Democratic hold.	▌ ✓ Harvey C. Garber (Democratic) 54.5%; ▌ Lewis H. Rogers (Republican) 44.2%; ▌ John E. Lugibill (Prohibition) 1.3%
Ohio 5	John S. Snook	Democratic	1900	Incumbent re-elected.	▌ ✓ John S. Snook (Democratic) 53.6%; ▌ George Russell (Republican) 46.4%
Ohio 6	Charles Q. Hildebrant	Republican	1900	Incumbent re-elected.	▌ ✓ Charles Q. Hildebrant (Republican) 55.1%; ▌ William G. Thompson (Democratic) 42.6%; ▌ E. T. Hays (Prohibition) 1.7%; ▌ Frederick G. Strickland (Socialist) 0.6%
Ohio 7	Thomas B. Kyle	Republican	1900	Incumbent re-elected.	▌ ✓ Thomas B. Kyle (Republican) 55.0%; ▌ Chester E. Bryan (Democratic) 41.9%; ▌ Ralph Howell (Socialist) 1.8%; ▌ William F. Cannon (Prohibition) 1.3%
Ohio 8	William R. Warnock	Republican	1900	Incumbent re-elected.	▌ ✓ William R. Warnock (Republican) 55.9%; ▌ William R. Niven (Democratic) 42.0%; ▌ J. W. Yeisley (Prohibition) 2.1%
Ohio 9	James H. Southard	Republican	1894	Incumbent re-elected.	▌ ✓ James H. Southard (Republican) 56.6%; ▌ Charles I. York (Democratic) 37.7%; ▌ James S. Pyle (Socialist) 4.9%; ▌ Harry McLane (Prohibition) 1.4%
Ohio 10	Stephen Morgan	Republican	1898	Incumbent re-elected.	▌ ✓ Stephen Morgan (Republican) 59.6%; ▌ C. E. Belcher (Democratic) 39.0%; ▌ George P. Taubman (Prohibition) 1.4%
Ohio 11	Charles H. Grosvenor	Republican	1892	Incumbent re-elected.	▌ ✓ Charles H. Grosvenor (Republican) 53.7%; ▌ Edward I. Lawrence (Democratic) 45.3%; ▌ William Cornell (Prohibition) 1.1%
Ohio 12	Emmett Tompkins	Republican	1900	Incumbent retired. Democratic gain.	▌ ✓ De Witt C. Badger (Democratic) 50.4%; ▌ Cyrus Huling (Republican) 48.3%; ▌ Alfred B. Paul (Prohibition) 1.2%; ▌ Otto C. Steinhoff (Socialist Labor) 0.1%
Ohio 13	James A. Norton	Democratic	1896	Incumbent lost re-election. Republican gain.	▌ ✓ Amos H. Jackson (Republican) 49.4%; ▌ James A. Norton (Democratic) 48.7%; ▌ Hewson L. Peeke (Prohibition) 1.0%; ▌ Charles R. Martin (Socialist) 0.9%
Ohio 14	William W. Skiles	Republican	1900	Incumbent re-elected.	▌ ✓ William W. Skiles (Republican) 54.9%; ▌ George B. Neal (Democratic) 43.2%; ▌ E. P. Getchell (Prohibition) 1.9%
Ohio 15	H. Clay Van Voorhis	Republican	1892	Incumbent re-elected.	▌ ✓ H. Clay Van Voorhis (Republican) 49.3%; ▌ Ernest B. Schneider (Democratic) 47.6%; ▌ Joseph E. Greene (Prohibition) 3.1%
Ohio 16	Joseph J. Gill	Republican	1899	Incumbent re-elected.	▌ ✓ Joseph J. Gill (Republican) 56.9%; ▌ Joseph V. Lawler (Democratic) 40.6%; ▌ Thomas W. Shreve (Prohibition) 2.5%
Ohio 17	John W. Cassingham	Democratic	1900	Incumbent re-elected.	▌ ✓ John W. Cassingham (Democratic) 52.9%; ▌ W. B. Stevens (Republican) 47.1%
Ohio 18	Robert Walker Tayler	Republican	1894	Incumbent retired. Republican hold.	▌ ✓ James Kennedy (Republican) 53.8%; ▌ William J. Foley (Democratic) 25.1%; ▌ Thomas J. Duffy (Labor) 19.0%; ▌ Enos H. Brosius (Prohibition) 2.1%
Ohio 19	Charles W. F. Dick	Republican	1898	Incumbent re-elected.	▌ ✓ Charles W. F. Dick (Republican) 62.0%; ▌ Oliver D. Everhead (Democratic) 33.3%; ▌ William Frost Crispin (Prohibition) 2.7%; ▌ Joseph J. Forrester (Socialist) 2.0%
Ohio 20	Jacob A. Beidler	Republican	1900	Incumbent re-elected.	▌ ✓ Jacob A. Beidler (Republican) 52.4%; ▌ Charles A. Kohl (Democratic) 43.1%; ▌ W. E. Krumroy (Socialist) 3.0%; ▌ Joseph N. Scholes (Prohibition) 1.5%
Ohio 21	Theodore E. Burton	Republican	1894	Incumbent re-elected.	▌ ✓ Theodore E. Burton (Republican) 57.0%; ▌ Edmund G. Vail (Democratic) 39.3%; ▌ Harry D. Thomas (Socialist) 2.4%; ▌ Paul Durger (Socialist Labor) 0.7%; ▌ E. Jay Pinney (Prohibition) 0.6%

== Oklahoma Territory ==
See Non-voting delegates, below.

== Oregon ==
District	Incumbent			This race	
District	Member	Party	First elected	Results	Candidates
Oregon 1	Thomas H. Tongue	Republican	1896	Incumbent re-elected, but died before next term began.	▌ ✓ Thomas H. Tongue (Republican) 52.9%; ▌J. K. Weatherford (Democratic) 36.4%; ▌Benjamin Franklin Ramp (Socialist) 5.8%; ▌Hiram Gould (Prohibition) 4.9%
Oregon 2	Malcolm A. Moody	Republican	1898	Incumbent lost renomination. Republican hold.	▌ ✓ John N. Williamson (Republican) 53.5%; ▌W. F. Butcher (Democratic) 35.7%; ▌Diedrich T. Gerdes (Socialist) 6.3%; ▌F. R. Spaulding (Prohibition) 4.5%

== Pennsylvania ==
District	Incumbent			This race	
District	Member	Party	First elected	Results	Candidates
Pennsylvania 1	Henry H. Bingham	Republican	1878	Incumbent re-elected.	▌ ✓ Henry H. Bingham (Republican/Union) 100.0%
Pennsylvania 2	Robert Adams Jr.	Republican	1893	Incumbent re-elected.	▌ ✓ Robert Adams Jr. (Republican/Union) 99.4%; ▌ Edward B. Cooper (Prohibition) 0.6%
Pennsylvania 3	Henry Burk	Republican	1900	Incumbent re-elected.	▌ ✓ Henry Burk (Republican/Union) 98.8%; ▌ Edward W. Marsh (Prohibition) 1.1%
Pennsylvania 4	Robert H. Foerderer; Redistricted from the at-large district	Republican	1900	Incumbent re-elected.	▌ ✓ Robert H. Foerderer (Republican/Union) 98.3%; ▌ T. T. Mutchler (Prohibition) 1.7%
Pennsylvania 5	Edward de Veaux Morrell	Republican	1900	Incumbent re-elected.	▌ ✓ Edward de Veaux Morrell (Republican/Union) 98.9%; ▌ Raymond A Smith (Prohibition) 1.1%
Pennsylvania 6	James R. Young; Redistricted from the 4th district	Republican	1896	Incumbent retired. Republican hold.	▌ ✓ George D. McCreary (Republican/Union) 98.4%; ▌ Lewis Lincoln Eavenson (Prohibition) 1.6%
Pennsylvania 7	Thomas S. Butler; Redistricted from the 6th district	Republican	1896	Incumbent re-elected.	▌ ✓ Thomas S. Butler (Republican) 65.3%; ▌ Frank B. Rhodes (Democratic) 31.8%; ▌ Joseph H. Paschall (Prohibition) 2.2%; ▌ William H. Keevan (Socialist) 0.7%
Pennsylvania 8	Irving P. Wanger; Redistricted from the 7th district	Republican	1892	Incumbent re-elected.	▌ ✓ Irving P. Wanger (Republican) 52.0%; ▌ Charles E. Ingersoll (Democratic) 46.1%; ▌ William Jaques (Socialist) 1.0%; ▌ Oliver H. Holcomb (Prohibition) 0.9%
Pennsylvania 9	Henry B. Cassel; Redistricted from the 10th district	Republican	1901	Incumbent re-elected.	▌ ✓ Henry B. Cassel (Republican) 69.7%; ▌ James F. McCoy (Democratic) 26.8%; ▌ David Bixler (Socialist) 1.9%; ▌ D. S. Von Neida (Prohibition) 1.5%
Pennsylvania 10	William Connell; Redistricted from the 11th district	Republican	1896	Incumbent lost re-election. Democratic gain.	▌ ✓ George Howell (Democratic) 48.4%; ▌ William Connell (Republican) 46.8%; ▌ Charles E. Lamb (Socialist) 2.5%; ▌ Edward S. Williams (Prohibition) 2.3%
Pennsylvania 10	William Connell; Redistricted from the 11th district	Republican	1896	Election successfully contested. Incumbent seated February 10, 1904.	▌ ✓ William Connell (Republican); ▌ George Howell (Democratic); ▌ Charles E. Lamb (Socialist); ▌ Edward S. Williams (Prohibition)
Pennsylvania 11	Henry W. Palmer; Redistricted from the 12th district	Republican	1900	Incumbent re-elected.	▌ ✓ Henry W. Palmer (Republican/Prohibition) 48.3%; ▌ T. R. Martin (Democratic) 40.5%; ▌ C. F. Quinn (Socialist) 11.2%
Pennsylvania 12	George R. Patterson; Redistricted from the 13th district	Republican	1900	Incumbent re-elected.	▌ ✓ George R. Patterson (Republican) 49.2%; ▌ James W. Ryan (Democratic) 43.1%; ▌ Thomas J. Lannon (Socialist) 6.7%; ▌ William H. Zweizig (Prohibition) 1.0%
Pennsylvania 13	Henry D. Green; Redistricted from the 9th district	Democratic	1899	Incumbent retired. Democratic hold.	▌ ✓ Marcus C. L. Kline (Democratic) 54.1%; ▌ William H. Sowden (Republican) 43.2%; ▌ Alfred Brown (Socialist) 2.7%
Pennsylvania 14	Charles Frederick Wright; Redistricted from the 15th district	Republican	1898	Incumbent re-elected.	▌ ✓ Charles Frederick Wright (Republican) 54.9%; ▌ James West (Democratic) 40.9%; ▌ Francis H. Dickerson (Prohibition) 4.2%
Pennsylvania 14	Galusha A. Grow; Redistricted from the at-large district	Republican	1894	Incumbent retired. Republican loss.	▌ ✓ Charles Frederick Wright (Republican) 54.9%; ▌ James West (Democratic) 40.9%; ▌ Francis H. Dickerson (Prohibition) 4.2%
Pennsylvania 15	Elias Deemer; Redistricted from the 16th district	Republican	1900	Incumbent re-elected.	▌ ✓ Elias Deemer (Republican) 52.4%; ▌ James Mansel (Democratic/Prohibition) 44.9%; ▌ Charles A. Reese (Socialist) 2.7%
Pennsylvania 16	Rufus K. Polk; Redistricted from the 17th district	Democratic	1898	Incumbent died. Democratic hold.	▌ ✓ Charles Heber Dickerman (Democratic) 50.3%; ▌ Frederic A. Godcharles (Republican) 47.2%; ▌ Harry Curtin Harman (Prohibition) 2.5%
Pennsylvania 17	Thaddeus M. Mahon; Redistricted from the 18th district	Republican	1892	Incumbent re-elected.	▌ ✓ Thaddeus M. Mahon (Republican) 55.9%; ▌ Harry I. Huber (Democratic) 44.1%
Pennsylvania 18	Marlin E. Olmsted; Redistricted from the 14th district	Republican	1896	Incumbent re-elected.	▌ ✓ Marlin E. Olmsted (Republican) 59.7%; ▌ Benjamin L. Forster (Democratic) 36.9%; ▌ John W. Ellenberger (Prohibition) 3.3%
Pennsylvania 19	Alvin Evans; Redistricted from the 20th district	Republican	1900	Incumbent re-elected.	▌ ✓ Alvin Evans (Republican) 56.8%; ▌ Robert E. Creswell (Democratic) 42.8%; ▌ Joseph E. Thropp (Union) 0.4%
Pennsylvania 20	Robert Jacob Lewis; Redistricted from the 19th district	Republican	1900	Incumbent retired. Republican hold.	▌ ✓ Daniel F. Lafean (Republican) 50.5%; ▌ William McClean (Democratic) 48.5%; ▌ John Tome (Socialist) 1.0%
Pennsylvania 21	None (New district)			New district. Republican gain.	▌ ✓ Solomon R. Dresser (Republican) 53.5%; ▌ Delos Eugene Hibner (Democratic) 42.4%; ▌ Benjamin N. McCoy (Prohibition) 4.1%
Pennsylvania 22	Joseph B. Showalter; Redistricted from the 25th district	Republican	1897	Incumbent retired. Republican hold.	▌ ✓ George F. Huff (Republican) 57.7%; ▌ Charles M. Heineman (Democratic) 39.9%; ▌ James S. Woodburn (Prohibition) 2.4%
Pennsylvania 23	None (New district)			New district. Republican gain.	▌ ✓ Allen F. Cooper (Republican) 51.1%; ▌ Orram W. Kennedy (Democratic) 45.3%; ▌ Harold L. Robinson (Prohibition) 3.6%
Pennsylvania 24	Ernest F. Acheson	Republican	1894	Incumbent re-elected.	▌ ✓ Ernest F. Acheson (Republican) 55.1%; ▌ Charles R. Eckert (Democratic) 36.2%; ▌ John A. Bailey (Prohibition) 4.9%; ▌ George Frethey (Socialist Labor) 3.3%; ▌ J. H. Cunningham (Citizens Rep.) 0.5%
Pennsylvania 25	Arthur L. Bates; Redistricted from the 26th district	Republican	1900	Incumbent re-elected.	▌ ✓ Arthur L. Bates (Republican) 52.4%; ▌ A. B. Osborne (Democratic) 38.1%; ▌ Faye B. Ocamb (Socialist) 5.5%; ▌ E. T. Mason (Prohibition) 3.3%; ▌ L. M. Cunningham (Socialist Labor) 0.7%
Pennsylvania 26	Howard Mutchler; Redistricted from the 8th district	Democratic	1900	Incumbent retired. Democratic hold.	▌ ✓ Joseph H. Shull (Democratic) 53.3%; ▌ Fred Nesbit (Republican) 39.2%; ▌ James Hughes (Socialist) 5.7%; ▌ A. E. Dreibelbies (Prohibition) 1.9%
Pennsylvania 27	Summers M. Jack; Redistricted from the 21st district	Republican	1898	Incumbent retired. Republican hold.	▌ ✓ William Orlando Smith (Republican) 57.9%; ▌ Alfred W. Smiley (Democratic) 38.4%; ▌ William Haupt (Prohibition) 3.6%
Pennsylvania 28	Joseph C. Sibley; Redistricted from the 27th district	Republican	1898	Incumbent re-elected.	▌ ✓ Joseph C. Sibley (Republican) 52.5%; ▌ James B. Watson (Democratic) 38.4%; ▌ Richard A. Buzza (Prohibition) 9.1%
Pennsylvania 28	James Knox Polk Hall	Democratic	1898	Incumbent resigned. Democratic loss.	▌ ✓ Joseph C. Sibley (Republican) 52.5%; ▌ James B. Watson (Democratic) 38.4%; ▌ Richard A. Buzza (Prohibition) 9.1%
Pennsylvania 29	William H. Graham; Redistricted from the 23rd district	Republican	1898	Incumbent lost re-election. Citizens Republican gain.	▌ ✓ George Shiras III (Citizens Rep. / Democratic) 49.4%; ▌ William H. Graham (Republican) 49.4%; ▌ Ephraim L. Eaton (Prohibition) 0.8%; ▌ William E. Hunt (Socialist Labor) 0.4%
Pennsylvania 30	John Dalzell; Redistricted from the 22nd district	Republican	1886	Incumbent re-elected.	▌ ✓ John Dalzell (Republican) 95.1%; ▌ George B. Garber (Prohibition) 2.6%; ▌ Hamlet Jackson (Socialist Labor) 2.3%
Pennsylvania 31	None (New district)			New district. Citizens Republican gain.	▌ ✓ Henry Kirke Porter (Citizens Rep. / Democratic) 52.6%; ▌ James F. Burke (Republican) 47.1%; ▌ John F. Conley (Socialist Labor) 0.3%
Pennsylvania 32	None (New district)			New district. Citizens Republican gain.	▌ ✓ James W. Brown (Citizens Rep. / Democratic) 50.8%; ▌ Andrew J. Barchfeld (Republican) 47.1%; ▌ D. E. Gilchrist (Socialist Labor) 1.1%; ▌ Robert H. Hood (Prohibition) 1.0%

== Rhode Island ==
District	Incumbent			This race	
District	Member	Party	First elected	Results	Candidates
Rhode Island 1	Melville Bull	Republican	1894	Incumbent lost re-election. Democratic gain.	▌ ✓ Daniel L. D. Granger (Democratic) 49.0%; ▌ Melville Bull (Republican) 46.9%; ▌ James P. Reid (Socialist Labor) 2.8%; ▌ Ernest G.W. Wesley (Prohibition) 1.3%
Rhode Island 2	Adin B. Capron	Republican	1896	Incumbent re-elected.	▌ ✓ Adin B. Capron (Republican) 50.2%; ▌ Franklin P. Owen (Democratic) 46.5%; ▌ Henry B. Dexter (Prohibition) 3.3%

== South Carolina ==
District	Incumbent			This race	
District	Member	Party	First elected	Results	Candidates
South Carolina 1	William Elliott	Democratic	1886; 1896	Incumbent retired to run for U.S. senator. Democratic hold.	▌ ✓ George Swinton Legaré (Democratic) 95.5%; ▌Aaron P. Prioleau (Republican) 4.5%
South Carolina 2	W. Jasper Talbert	Democratic	1892	Incumbent retired to run for governor of South Carolina. Democratic hold.	▌ ✓ George W. Croft (Democratic) 94.9%; ▌W. S. Dixon (Republican) 5.0%; Others 0.1%
South Carolina 3	Asbury Latimer	Democratic	1892	Incumbent retired to run for U.S. senator. Democratic hold.	▌ ✓ Wyatt Aiken (Democratic) 98.9%; ▌John Scott (Republican) 1.1%
South Carolina 4	Joseph T. Johnson	Democratic	1900	Incumbent re-elected.	▌ ✓ Joseph T. Johnson (Democratic) 98.7%; ▌L. W. C. Blalock (Republican) 1.3%
South Carolina 5	David E. Finley	Democratic	1898	Incumbent re-elected.	▌ ✓ David E. Finley (Democratic) 99.3%; ▌C. P. T. White (Republican) 0.7%
South Carolina 6	Robert B. Scarborough	Democratic	1900	Incumbent re-elected.	▌ ✓ Robert B. Scarborough (Democratic); Unopposed
South Carolina 7	A. Frank Lever	Democratic	1901 (special)	Incumbent re-elected.	▌ ✓ A. Frank Lever (Democratic) 96.2%; ▌Alexander D. Dantzler (Republican) 3.8%

== South Dakota ==
District	Incumbent			This race	
District	Member	Party	First elected	Results	Candidates
South Dakota at-large (2 seats elected on a general ticket)	Charles H. Burke	Republican	1898	Incumbent re-elected.	▌ ✓ Eben Martin (Republican) 32.62%; ▌ ✓ Charles H. Burke (Republican) 32.52%; ▌John R. Wilson (Democratic) 14.21%; ▌F. C. Robinson (Democratic) 14.01%; ▌Freeman Knowles (Socialist) 1.84%; ▌Walter Price (Socialist) 1.71%; ▌J. W. Kelley (Prohibition) 1.56%; ▌W. W. Smith (Prohibition) 1.52%
South Dakota at-large (2 seats elected on a general ticket)	Eben Martin	Republican	1900	Incumbent re-elected.	▌ ✓ Eben Martin (Republican) 32.62%; ▌ ✓ Charles H. Burke (Republican) 32.52%; ▌John R. Wilson (Democratic) 14.21%; ▌F. C. Robinson (Democratic) 14.01%; ▌Freeman Knowles (Socialist) 1.84%; ▌Walter Price (Socialist) 1.71%; ▌J. W. Kelley (Prohibition) 1.56%; ▌W. W. Smith (Prohibition) 1.52%

== Tennessee ==
District	Incumbent			This race	
District	Member	Party	First elected	Results	Candidates
Tennessee 1	Walter P. Brownlow	Republican	1896	Incumbent re-elected.	▌ ✓ Walter P. Brownlow (Republican) 61.19%; ▌Cyrus H. Lyle (Democratic) 38.81%
Tennessee 2	Henry R. Gibson	Republican	1894	Incumbent re-elected.	▌ ✓ Henry R. Gibson (Republican) 55.45%; ▌Harvey H. Hannah (Democratic) 44.55%
Tennessee 3	John A. Moon	Democratic	1896	Incumbent re-elected.	▌ ✓ John A. Moon (Democratic) 97.63%; ▌Frank Janeway (Ind. Republican) 2.37%
Tennessee 4	Charles E. Snodgrass	Democratic	1898	Incumbent lost renomination. Democratic hold.	▌ ✓ Morgan C. Fitzpatrick (Democratic) 64.89%; ▌G. H. West (Republican) 35.11%
Tennessee 5	James D. Richardson	Democratic	1884	Incumbent re-elected.	▌ ✓ James D. Richardson (Democratic) 76.82%; ▌J. W. Parker (Republican) 23.19%
Tennessee 6	John W. Gaines	Democratic	1896	Incumbent re-elected.	▌ ✓ John W. Gaines (Democratic) 82.31%; ▌A. M. Tillman (Republican) 17.69%
Tennessee 7	Lemuel P. Padgett	Democratic	1900	Incumbent re-elected.	▌ ✓ Lemuel P. Padgett (Democratic) 75.30%; ▌E. L. Gregory (Republican) 24.70%
Tennessee 8	Thetus W. Sims	Democratic	1896	Incumbent re-elected.	▌ ✓ Thetus W. Sims (Democratic) 52.77%; ▌F. M. Davis (Republican) 47.23%
Tennessee 9	Rice A. Pierce	Democratic	1896	Incumbent re-elected.	▌ ✓ Rice A. Pierce (Democratic) 82.56%; ▌A. D. Kellar (Republican) 17.44%
Tennessee 10	Malcolm R. Patterson	Democratic	1900	Incumbent re-elected.	▌ ✓ Malcolm R. Patterson (Democratic) 83.18%; ▌Thomas C. Phelan (Republican) 15.86%; ▌L. B. Eaton (Republican) 0.96%

== Texas ==
District	Incumbent			This race	
District	Member	Party	First elected	Results	Candidates
Texas 1	John L. Sheppard; Redistricted from the 4th district.	Democratic	1898	Incumbent died. Winner also elected to finish term. Democratic hold.	▌ ✓ Morris Sheppard (Democratic) 83.2%; ▌ John A. Hurley (Republican) 16.8%
Texas 2	Samuel B. Cooper	Democratic	1892	Incumbent re-elected.	▌ ✓ Samuel B. Cooper (Democratic) 86.7%; ▌ Warren McDaniel (Republican) 13.3%
Texas 3	Reese C. De Graffenreid	Democratic	1896	Incumbent died. Winner also elected to finish term. Democratic hold.	▌ ✓ Gordon J. Russell (Democratic) 95.0%; ▌ L. L. Rhodes (Republican) 3.2%; ▌ J. W. Yates (Republican) 1.6%
Texas 4	Choice B. Randell; Redistricted from the 5th district.	Democratic	1900	Incumbent re-elected.	▌ ✓ Choice B. Randell (Democratic) 85.1%; ▌ C. A. Gray (Republican) 14.9%
Texas 5	Dudley G. Wooten; Redistricted from the 6th district.	Democratic	1901	Incumbent lost renomination. Democratic hold.	▌ ✓ James Andrew Beall (Democratic) 88.4%; ▌ S. H. Lumpkin (Republican) 8.9%; ▌ O. F. Dornblaser (Populist) 1.9%; ▌ M. C. Scott (Socialist) 0.8%
Texas 6	None (New district)			New district. Democratic gain.	▌ ✓ Scott Field (Democratic) 100%
Texas 7	None (New district)			New district. Democratic gain.	▌ ✓ Alexander W. Gregg (Democratic) 100%
Texas 8	Thomas H. Ball; Redistricted from the 1st district.	Democratic	1896	Incumbent re-elected.	▌ ✓ Thomas H. Ball (Democratic) 68.0%; ▌ Lock McDaniel (Republican) 30.6%; ▌ M. H. Kimpton (Unknown) 1.3%
Texas 9	George F. Burgess; Redistricted from the 10th district.	Democratic	1900	Incumbent re-elected	▌ ✓ George F. Burgess (Democratic) 61.3%; ▌ Bruno R. Burow (Republican) 38.7%
Texas 9	Rudolph Kleberg; Redistricted from the 11th district.	Democratic	1896	Incumbent retired. Democratic loss.	▌ ✓ George F. Burgess (Democratic) 61.3%; ▌ Bruno R. Burow (Republican) 38.7%
Texas 10	Albert S. Burleson; Redistricted from the 9th district.	Democratic	1898	Incumbent re-elected	▌ ✓ Albert S. Burleson (Democratic) 87.2%; ▌ Charles Schenken (Republican) 12.7%
Texas 11	Robert L. Henry; Redistricted from the 7th district.	Democratic	1896	Incumbent re-elected	▌ ✓ Robert L. Henry (Democratic) 94.2%; ▌ A. Wurts (Republican) 4.5%; ▌ J. T. Harris (Unknown) 1.3%
Texas 12	S. W. T. Lanham; Redistricted from the 8th district.	Democratic	1896	Incumbent resigned to become Governor of Texas. Democratic hold.	▌ ✓ Oscar W. Gillespie (Democratic) 82.6%; ▌ S. A. Greenwell (Republican) 17.4%
Texas 13	John H. Stephens	Democratic	1896	Incumbent re-elected	▌ ✓ John H. Stephens (Democratic) 91.8%; ▌ R. O. Rector (Republican) 7.8%; ▌ Joseph Schmitt (Socialist) 0.4%
Texas 14	James L. Slayden; Redistricted from the 12th district.	Democratic	1896	Incumbent re-elected	▌ ✓ James L. Slayden (Democratic) 78.4%; ▌ D. H. Meek (Republican) 19.4%; ▌ A. B. Surber (Unknown) 1.4%; ▌ Frank J. Leitner (Socialist Labor) 0.7%
Texas 15	None (New district)			New district. Democratic gain.	▌ ✓ John Nance Garner (Democratic) 60.6%; ▌ John C. Scott (Republican) 39.2%
Texas 16	None (New district)			New district. Democratic gain.	▌ ✓ William R. Smith (Democratic) 88.0%; ▌ D. G. Hunt (Republican) 11.6%

== Utah ==
District	Incumbent			This race	
District	Member	Party	First elected	Results	Candidates
Utah at-large	George Sutherland	Republican	1900	Incumbent retired to run for U.S. Senator. Republican hold.	▌ ✓ Joseph Howell (Republican) 51.5%; ▌ William H. King (Democratic) 45.0%; ▌ Mathew Wilson (Social Democratic) 3.5%

== Vermont ==
District	Incumbent			This race	
District	Member	Party	First elected	Results	Candidates
Vermont 1	David J. Foster	Republican	1900	Incumbent re-elected.	▌ ✓ David J. Foster (Republican) 75.6%; ▌J. Walter Lyons (Democratic) 20.1%; ▌Henry M. Seely (Prohibition) 4.2%
Vermont 2	Kittredge Haskins	Republican	1900	Incumbent re-elected.	▌ ✓ Kittredge Haskins (Republican) 77.1%; ▌Harris Miller (Democratic) 18.0%; ▌Sherburne L. Swasey (Prohibition) 4.9%

== Virginia ==
District	Incumbent			This race	
District	Member	Party	First elected	Results	Candidates
Virginia 1	William A. Jones	Democratic	1890	Incumbent re-elected.	▌ ✓ William A. Jones (Democratic) 72.8%; ▌Malcolm A. Coles (Republican) 27.2%
Virginia 2	Harry L. Maynard	Democratic	1900	Incumbent re-elected.	▌ ✓ Harry L. Maynard (Democratic) 75.9%; ▌Robert M. Hughes (Republican) 22.7%; Others: ▌Lewis A. Hall (Socialist) 1.0%; ▌P. A. Wiggins (Socialist) 0.4%
Virginia 3	John Lamb	Democratic	1896	Incumbent re-elected.	▌ ✓ John Lamb (Democratic) 81.1%; ▌B. W. Edwards (Republican) 14.8%; ▌William E. Talley (Republican) 3.2%; Others: ▌John J. Quantz (Socialist Labor) 0.5%; ▌T. A. Hollins (Socialist) 0.3%; ▌Philip Harris (Republican) 0.1%
Virginia 4	Francis R. Lassiter	Democratic	1900 (special)	Incumbent retired. Democratic hold.	▌ ✓ Robert G. Southall (Democratic) 90.2%; ▌R. T. Vaughan (Independent) 8.0%; ▌Thomas A. Jones (Republican) 1.8%
Virginia 5	Claude A. Swanson	Democratic	1892	Incumbent re-elected.	▌ ✓ Claude A. Swanson (Democratic) 60.8%; ▌Beverly A. Davis (Republican) 37.6%; ▌Dan Dickerson (Prohibition) 1.6%
Virginia 6	Carter Glass	Democratic	1901 (special)	Incumbent re-elected.	▌ ✓ Carter Glass (Democratic) 79.4%; ▌Aaron Graham (Republican) 17.7%; Others: ▌James S. Cowden (Republican) 1.7%; ▌H. D. McTier (Socialist Labor) 1.1%
Virginia 7	James Hay	Democratic	1896	Incumbent re-elected.	▌ ✓ James Hay (Democratic) 64.7%; ▌Samuel J. Hoffman (Republican) 35.3%
Virginia 8	John Franklin Rixey	Democratic	1896	Incumbent re-elected.	▌ ✓ John Franklin Rixey (Democratic) 76.7%; ▌William Skinker Jr. (Republican) 23.3%
Virginia 9	William F. Rhea	Democratic	1898	Incumbent lost re-election. Republican gain.	▌ ✓ Campbell Slemp (Republican) 50.4%; ▌William F. Rhea (Democratic) 49.6%
Virginia 10	Henry D. Flood	Democratic	1900	Incumbent re-elected.	▌ ✓ Henry D. Flood (Democratic) 68.3%; ▌James Lyons (Republican) 31.7%

== Washington ==
District	Incumbent			This race	
District	Member	Party	First elected	Results	Candidates
Washington at-large (3 seats elected on a general ticket)	Wesley L. Jones	Republican	1898	Incumbent re-elected.	▌ ✓ Francis W. Cushman (Republican) 19.96%; ▌ ✓ Wesley L. Jones (Republican) 19.87%; ▌ ✓ William E. Humphrey (Republican) 19.61%; ▌George F. Cotterill (Democratic) 11.54%; ▌Frank B. Cole (Democratic) 11.00%; ▌Oscar Raymond Holcomb (Democratic) 10.80%; Others: ▌David D. Burgess (Socialist) 1.56%; ▌J. H. Scurlock (Socialist) 1.55%; ▌George W. Scott (Socialist) 1.50%; ▌O. L. Fowler (Prohibition) 0.60%; ▌W. J. McKean (Prohibition) 0.60%; ▌Ambrose H. Sherwood (Prohibition) 0.59%; ▌William McCormick (Socialist Labor) 0.28%; ▌Jense C. Martin (Socialist Labor) 0.27%
Washington at-large (3 seats elected on a general ticket)	Francis W. Cushman	Republican	1898	Incumbent re-elected.	
Washington at-large (3 seats elected on a general ticket)	None (new seat)			New seat. Republican gain.	

== West Virginia ==
District	Incumbent			This race	
District	Member	Party	First elected	Results	Candidates
West Virginia 1	Blackburn B. Dovener	Republican	1894	Incumbent re-elected.	▌ ✓ Blackburn B. Dovener (Republican) 52.05%; ▌Owen S. McKinney (Democratic) 44.12%; ▌G. W. Kinney (Prohibition) 3.83%
West Virginia 2	Alston G. Dayton	Republican	1894	Incumbent re-elected.	▌ ✓ Alston G. Dayton (Republican) 51.01%; ▌John T. McGraw (Democratic) 47.45%; ▌R. M. Stricker (Prohibition) 1.54%
West Virginia 3	Joseph H. Gaines	Republican	1900	Incumbent re-elected.	▌ ✓ Joseph H. Gaines (Republican) 52.96%; ▌James H. Miller (Democratic) 45.65%; ▌Squire Halstead (Prohibition) 1.39%
West Virginia 4	None (New district)			New district. Republican gain.	▌ ✓ Harry C. Woodyard (Republican) 52.01%; ▌W. N. Chancellor (Democratic) 46.06%; ▌George R. Brown (Prohibition) 1.93%
West Virginia 5	James A. Hughes; Redistricted from the 4th district	Republican	1900	Incumbent re-elected.	▌ ✓ James A. Hughes (Republican) 53.29%; ▌David E. Johnston (Democratic) 46.56%; ▌J. L. McGilliard (Prohibition) 0.15%

== Wisconsin ==
Wisconsin elected eleven members of congress on Election Day, November 4, 1902. This was Wisconsin's first election with eleven congressional seats, up from ten in the previous term.

District	Incumbent			This race	
District	Member	Party	First elected	Results	Candidates
Wisconsin 1	Henry Allen Cooper	Republican	1892	Incumbent re-elected.	▌ ✓ Henry Allen Cooper (Republican) 60.7%; ▌Lewis C. Baker (Democratic) 36.0%; ▌Thomas W. North (Prohibition) 3.3%
Wisconsin 2	Herman Dahle	Republican	1898	Incumbent lost renomination. Republican hold.	▌ ✓ Henry Cullen Adams (Republican) 52.8%; ▌John J. Wood (Democratic) 43.6%; ▌Charles F. Cronk (Prohibition) 3.6%
Wisconsin 3	Joseph W. Babcock	Republican	1892	Incumbent re-elected.	▌ ✓ Joseph W. Babcock (Republican) 60.8%; ▌Jackson Silbaugh (Democratic) 35.0%; ▌Edward Owens (Prohibition) 4.2%
Wisconsin 4	Theobald Otjen	Republican	1894	Incumbent re-elected.	▌ ✓ Theobald Otjen (Republican) 44.1%; ▌John F. Donovan (Democratic) 39.3%; ▌Herman W. Bisborins (Social Dem.) 15.1%; ▌Lyle B. Walker (Prohibition) 1.1%; ▌Frank R. Wilke (Socialist Labor) 0.4%
Wisconsin 5	Samuel S. Barney	Republican	1894	Incumbent retired. Republican hold.	▌ ✓ William H. Stafford (Republican) 45.8%; ▌Henry Smith (Democratic) 33.6%; ▌Henry C. Berger (Social Dem.) 18.5%; ▌Winfield D. Cox (Prohibition) 1.4%; ▌Charles M. Minkley (Socialist Labor) 0.6%
Wisconsin 6	James H. Davidson	Republican	1896	Incumbent redistricted to 8th district. Democratic gain.	▌ ✓ Charles H. Weisse (Democratic) 52.2%; ▌William Froehlich (Republican) 42.3%; ▌John P. Wilson (Social Dem.) 4.0%; ▌George C. Hill (Prohibition) 1.5%
Wisconsin 7	John J. Esch	Republican	1898	Incumbent re-elected.	▌ ✓ John J. Esch (Republican) 64.5%; ▌William Cernahan (Democratic) 32.3%; ▌Frank R. Sebenthal (Prohibition) 3.2%
Wisconsin 8	Edward S. Minor	Republican	1894	Incumbent redistricted to 9th district. Republican hold.	▌ ✓ James H. Davidson (Republican) 57.8%; ▌Thomas H. Patterson (Democratic) 37.4%; ▌Joseph Matthews (Prohibition) 2.4%; ▌Charles C. Fraim (Social Dem.) 2.4%
Wisconsin 9	Webster E. Brown	Republican	1900	Incumbent redistricted to 10th district. Republican hold.	▌ ✓ Edward S. Minor (Republican) 57.1%; ▌Edward Decker (Democratic) 41.1%; ▌Thomas W. Lomas (Prohibition) 1.9%
Wisconsin 10	John J. Jenkins	Republican	1894	Incumbent redistricted to 11th district. Republican hold.	▌ ✓ Webster E. Brown (Republican) 55.6%; ▌Burt Williams (Democratic) 42.5%; ▌William D. Badger (Prohibition) 1.9%
Wisconsin 11	None (new seat)			New seat. Republican gain.	▌ ✓ John J. Jenkins (Republican) 67.4%; ▌Joseph A. Rene (Democratic) 28.8%; ▌Moses Y. Cliff (Prohibition) 3.8%

== Wyoming ==
District	Incumbent			This race	
District	Member	Party	First elected	Results	Candidates
Wyoming at-large	Frank W. Mondell	Republican	1898	Incumbent re-elected.	▌ ✓ Frank W. Mondell (Republican) 64.00%; ▌Charles P. Clemmons (Democratic) 36.00%

== Non-voting delegates ==
District	Incumbent			This race	
District	Delegate	Party	First elected	Results	Candidates
Arizona Territory at-large	Marcus A. Smith	Democratic	1900	Incumbent retired. Democratic hold.	▌ ✓ John F. Wilson (Democratic) 49.27%; ▌Joseph E. Morrison (Republican) 47.00%; ▌(FNU) Neissl (Socialist) 2.60%; ▌O. Gibson (Prohibition) 1.14%
Hawaii Territory at-large	Robert Wilcox	Home Rule	1900	Incumbent lost re-election. Republican gain.	▌ ✓ Jonah Kūhiō Kalanianaʻole (Republican) 58.52%; ▌Robert Wilcox (Home Rule) 41.48%
New Mexico Territory at-large
Oklahoma Territory at-large	Dennis T. Flynn	Republican	1892; 1894 (lost); 1898	Incumbent retired. Republican hold.	▌ ✓ Bird S. McGuire (Republican) 50.22%; ▌William M. Cross (Democratic) 49.78%

== See also ==
- 1902 United States elections
  - 1902–03 United States Senate elections
- 57th United States Congress
- 58th United States Congress

== Bibliography ==
- Republican Congressional Committee, The Republican Campaign Textbook 1902 (1902).
- Dubin, Michael J. (March 1, 1998). United States Congressional Elections, 1788-1997: The Official Results of the Elections of the 1st Through 105th Congresses. McFarland and Company. ISBN 978-0786402830.
- Martis, Kenneth C. (January 1, 1989). The Historical Atlas of Political Parties in the United States Congress, 1789-1989. Macmillan Publishing Company. ISBN 978-0029201701.
- Moore, John L., ed. (1994). Congressional Quarterly's Guide to U.S. Elections (Third ed.). Congressional Quarterly Inc. ISBN 978-0871879967.
- "Party Divisions of the House of Representatives* 1789–Present". Office of the Historian, House of United States House of Representatives.
- Secretary of State (1903). Maryland Manual 1902. Baltimore: Wm. J. C. Dulany Co.
