= Monroe H. Kulp =

American politician

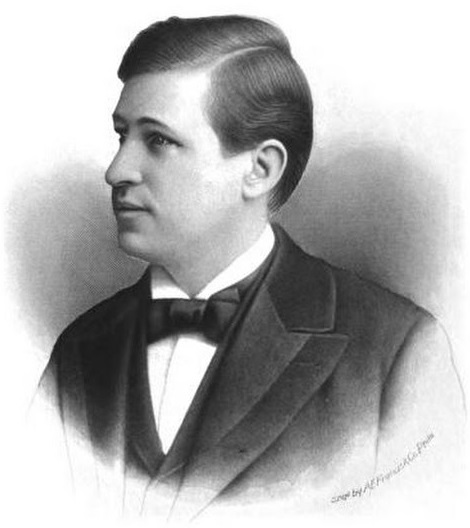
- From Volume 1 (1898) of Prominent and Progressive Pennsylvanians of the Nineteenth Century

Member of the U.S. House of Representatives from Pennsylvania's 17th district
- In office March 4, 1895 – March 3, 1899
- Preceded by: Simon P. Wolverton
- Succeeded by: Rufus K. Polk

Personal details
- Born: October 23, 1858 Barto, Pennsylvania
- Died: October 19, 1911 (aged 52) Shamokin, Pennsylvania
- Party: Republican
- Education: State Normal College; Eastman Business College

Monroe Henry Kulp (October 23, 1858 – October 19, 1911) was a Republican member of the U.S. House of Representatives from Pennsylvania.

== Early life ==
Kulp was born in Barto, Pennsylvania on October 23, 1858, the son of Darlington R. Kulp and Elizabeth (Gilbert) Kulp. He attended the public schools of Shamokin, Pennsylvania, the State Normal College in Lebanon, Ohio, and graduated from Eastman Business College in Poughkeepsie, New York.

== Career ==
After college, Kulp was engaged in the coal, lumber, brick, and ice businesses in Shamokin. After having started in his father's businesses, Kulp organized several ventures of his own, often in partnership with his brother G. Gilbert Kulp and friend D. C. Kaseman, and their interests grew to include timber lands, railroads, residential and commercial real estate, and banks. Kulp also became involved in several Shamokin area utilities, including the telephone, electricity, water, and sewer, and trolley companies.

== Congressman ==
Kulp was elected as a Republican to the Fifty-fourth and Fifty-fifth Congresses. He was not a candidate for renomination in 1898. He was a delegate to the 1900 Republican National Convention.

== Death and burial ==
Kulp suffered from Bright's disease, rheumatism, and other ailments. He traveled extensively in an effort to regain his health, but was unsuccessful. He died in Shamokin on October 19, 1911. He was buried at Shamokin City Cemetery.

== Family ==
In 1897, Kulp married Sara Washington Detweiler of Harrisburg, Pennsylvania. They had no children.

== Sources ==
=== Books ===
- Williamson, Leland L., et al., editors (1898). Prominent and Progressive Pennsylvanians of the Nineteenth Century. Vol. 1. Philadelphia, PA: Record Publishing Company.

=== Newspapers ===
- "Hon. H. M. Kulp Died Today". Mount Carmel Item. Mount Carmel, PA. October 19, 1911 – via Newspapers.com.
- "Obsequies of Ex-Congressman Kulp". Pittston Gazette. Pittston, PA. October 24, 1911 – via Newspapers.com.

U.S. House of Representatives
Preceded by Simon P. Wolverton	Member of the U.S. House of Representatives from Pennsylvania's 17th congressional district 1895–1899	Succeeded by Rufus K. Polk
