= Lucius E. Polk =

Confederate Army general

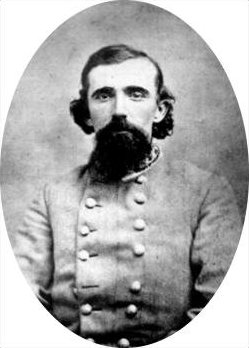
- Born: July 10, 1833; Salisbury, North Carolina
- Died: December 1, 1892 (aged 59); Columbia, Tennessee
- Burial place: Saint John's Church Cemetery, Ashwood, Tennessee
- Military career
- Allegiance: Confederate States of America
- Branch: Confederate States Army
- Service years: 1861–1864
- Rank: Brigadier General
- Conflicts: American Civil War: Battle of Shiloh; Battle of Richmond; Battle of Perryville; Battle of Murfreesboro; Battle of Chickamauga; Chattanooga campaign; Battle of Ringgold Gap; Battle of Kennesaw Mountain
- Other work: Planter; Politician

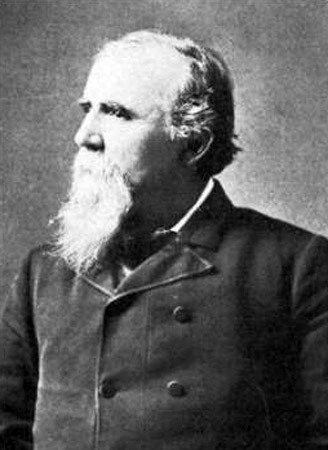
Lucius Polk in his later years

Brigadier-General Lucius Eugene Polk (July 10, 1833 – December 1, 1892) was a senior officer of the Confederate States Army who commanded infantry in the Western Theater of the American Civil War. He was a nephew of Leonidas Polk.

== Early life ==
Polk was born in Salisbury, North Carolina. When he was two years of age, the family moved near Columbia, Tennessee. Polk attended the University of Virginia in 1850-51, before settling in Helena, Arkansas, where he was a planter.

== Civil War ==
In 1861, Polk enlisted in the Yell Rifles as a private under Patrick Cleburne, who he served under during most of the War. At the Battle of Shiloh, then Junior Second Lieutenant Polk was wounded in the face. He was promoted to colonel of the 15th Arkansas Infantry Regiment following Shiloh. When Cleburne was promoted to divisional command, Polk was appointed brigadier general to date from December 13, 1862. Polk took part in fighting at Stones River, Chickamauga, Chattanooga, and in the Atlanta campaign. In June 1864, Polk was severely wounded (the fourth time during the war) at the Battle of Kennesaw Mountain and was honorably discharged from the Army.

== Post-war career ==
Polk returned to Columbia after his wounding at Kennesaw. He served as a delegate to the 1884 Democratic National Convention in Chicago. In 1886, he was elected to the Tennessee Senate as a Democrat, serving from 1887 to 1889.

== Death and legacy ==
Polk received high praise from Confederate soldier Sam Watkins, who wrote of him in his book Co. Aytch: "In every battle he was engaged in, he led his men to victory, or held the enemy at bay, while the surge of battle was against us; he always seemed the successful general, who would snatch victory out of the very jaws of defeat. In every battle, Polk's brigade, of Cleburne's division, almost making the name of Cleburne as the Stonewall of the West. Polk was to Cleburne what Murat or the Old Guard was to Napoleon."

Polk died in Columbia, Tennessee, and is buried at St. John's Church Cemetery at nearby Ashwood. His son Rufus King Polk was a Congressman from Pennsylvania.

== See also ==
- List of American Civil War generals (Confederate)
