= Alexander Billmeyer =

American politician

Member of the U.S. House of Representatives from Pennsylvania's 17th district
- In office November 4, 1902 – March 3, 1903
- Preceded by: Rufus K. Polk
- Succeeded by: Thaddeus M. Mahon

Personal details
- Born: January 7, 1841 Liberty Township, Pennsylvania
- Died: May 24, 1924 (aged 83)
- Party: Democratic

Alexander Billmeyer (January 7, 1841 – May 24, 1924) was a Democratic member of the U.S. House of Representatives from Pennsylvania.

Alexander Billmeyer was born in Liberty Township, Pennsylvania. He was engaged in agricultural pursuits and the manufacture of lumber. He worked as director of a national bank in Washingtonville, Pennsylvania.

Billmeyer was elected as a Democrat to the Fifty-seventh Congress to fill the vacancy caused by the death of Rufus K. Polk. He was not a candidate for renomination in 1902. He resumed agricultural pursuits in Montour County, Pennsylvania, and died near Washingtonville in 1924. Interment was in Odd Fellows Cemetery in Danville, Pennsylvania.

== Sources ==
- United States Congress. "Alexander Billmeyer (id: B000465)". Biographical Directory of the United States Congress.
- The Political Graveyard

U.S. House of Representatives
| Preceded by Rufus K. Polk | Member of the U.S. House of Representatives from Pennsylvania's 17th congressional district 1902–1903 | Succeeded by Thaddeus M. Mahon |
