= Thaddeus M. Mahon =

American politician

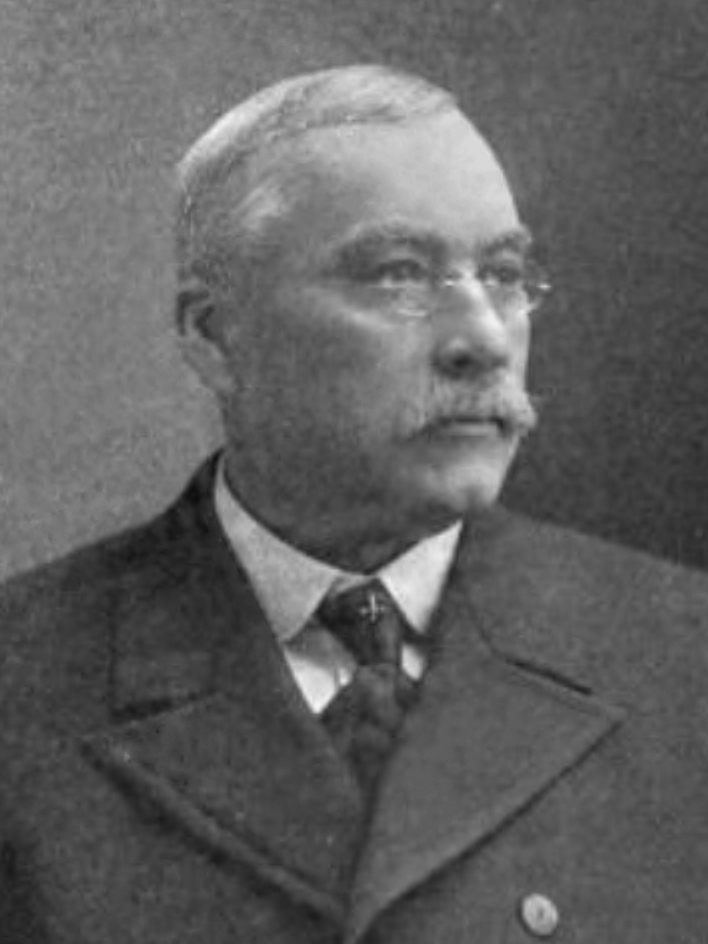
Thaddeus Maclay Mahon

Thaddeus Maclay Mahon (May 21, 1840 – May 31, 1916) was a soldier, attorney, railroad executive, and a Republican member of the U.S. House of Representatives from Pennsylvania.

Thaddeus M. Mahon was born in rural Green Village, Pennsylvania. During the American Civil War, he enlisted in August 1862 as a private in Company A, One Hundred and Twenty-sixth Regiment of the Pennsylvania Volunteers. After a term of service in this regiment, he reenlisted as a veteran in January 1864 in the Twenty-first Regiment, Pennsylvania Volunteer Cavalry, and served until September 1865.

Mahon studied law, was admitted to the bar in 1871, and commenced practice in southern Pennsylvania. He served as a member of the Pennsylvania State House of Representatives from 1870 to 1872. He was the president of Baltimore & Cumberland Valley Railroad. He was also a member of the commission having charge of the soldiers’ orphan schools of Pennsylvania. He was an unsuccessful candidate for election in 1876.

Mahon was elected as a Republican to the Fifty-third and to the six succeeding Congresses. He served as chairman of the United States House Committee on War Claims during the Fifty-fourth through the Fifty-ninth Congresses. He was not a candidate for renomination in 1906. He was engaged in business in Chambersburg, Pennsylvania.

He died in Scotland, Pennsylvania, in 1916. Interment was in Cedar Grove Cemetery in Chambersburg.

U.S. House of Representatives
Preceded by Louis E. Atkinson	Member of the U.S. House of Representatives from Pennsylvania's 18th congressional district 1893–1903	Succeeded by Marlin E. Olmsted
Preceded by Alexander Billmeyer	Member of the U.S. House of Representatives from Pennsylvania's 17th congressional district 1903–1907	Succeeded by Benjamin K. Focht
