= Rufus K. Polk =

American politician

Rufus King Polk
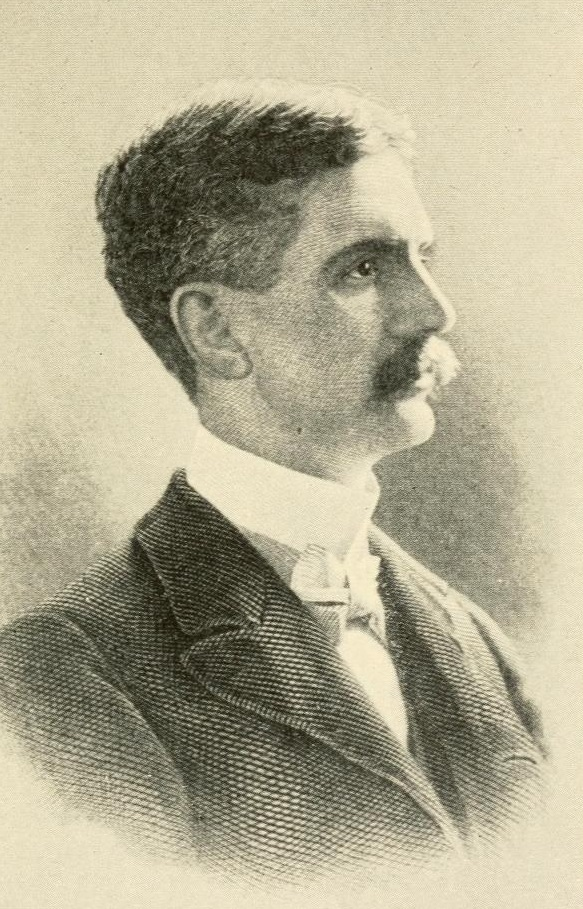

Member of the U.S. House of Representatives from Pennsylvania's 17th district
- In office March 4, 1899 – March 5, 1902
- Preceded by: Monroe H. Kulp
- Succeeded by: Alexander Billmeyer

Personal details
- Born: Rufus King Polk; August 23, 1866 Columbia, Tennessee, US
- Died: March 5, 1902 (aged 35) Philadelphia, Pennsylvania, US
- Resting place: Fairview Cemetery in Danville
- Party: Democratic
- Education: Lehigh University

Rufus King Polk (August 23, 1866 – March 5, 1902) was a Democratic member of the U.S. House of Representatives from Pennsylvania from 1899 to 1902.

== Biography ==
Rufus K. Polk was born in Columbia, Tennessee, the son of Confederate States Army Brigadier General Lucius E. Polk and great-nephew of Leonidas Polk.

=== Education ===
He attended Webb's Academy in Culleoka, Tennessee, graduated from Lehigh University in South Bethlehem, Pennsylvania, in 1887, and took a post-graduate course in mining engineering.

=== Career ===
He settled in Danville, Pennsylvania, and was employed as a chemist. He held supervisory positions with several steel companies and ultimately became engaged in the manufacture of structural iron.

He was a delegate to the 1900 Democratic National Convention.

=== Spanish-American War ===
He served as first lieutenant of Company F, Twelfth Regiment, Pennsylvania Volunteer Infantry, in the Spanish–American War.

=== Congress ===
Polk was elected as a Democrat to the Fifty-sixth and Fifty-seventh Congresses and served until his death in Philadelphia, Pennsylvania.

=== Death and burial ===
He is buried in Fairview Cemetery in Danville, Pennsylvania.

== See also ==
- List of members of the United States Congress who died in office (1900–1949)

== Sources ==
- United States Congress. "Rufus K. Polk (id: P000410)". Biographical Directory of the United States Congress.
- The Political Graveyard

U.S. House of Representatives
Preceded by Monroe H. Kulp	Member of the U.S. House of Representatives from Pennsylvania's 17th congressional district 1899–1902	Succeeded by Alexander Billmeyer
