= 1895 United States House of Representatives elections =

1895 U.S. House of Representatives elections
- February 23, 1895 – November 5, 1895

8 (out of 357) seats in the U.S. House of Representatives 179 seats needed for a majority
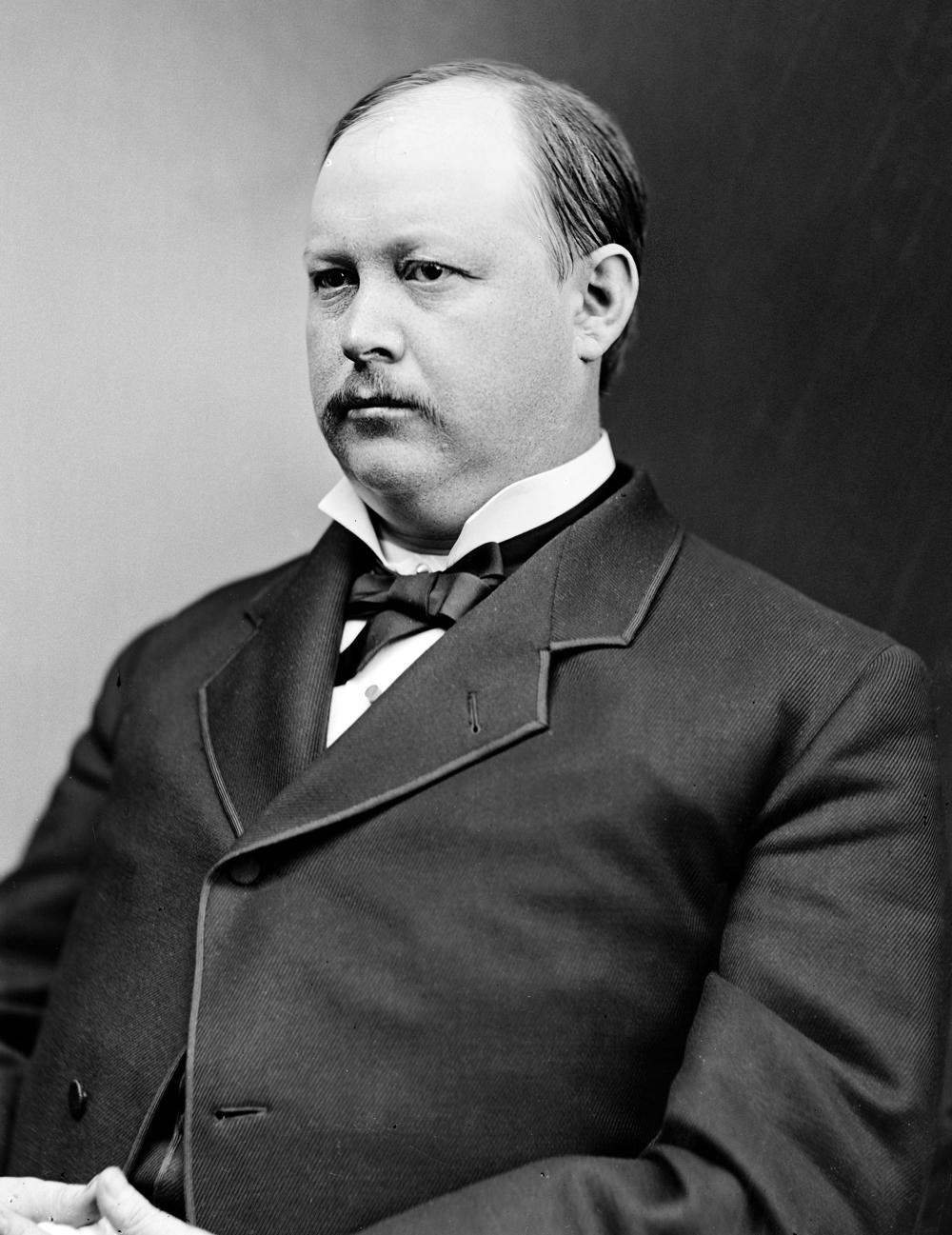

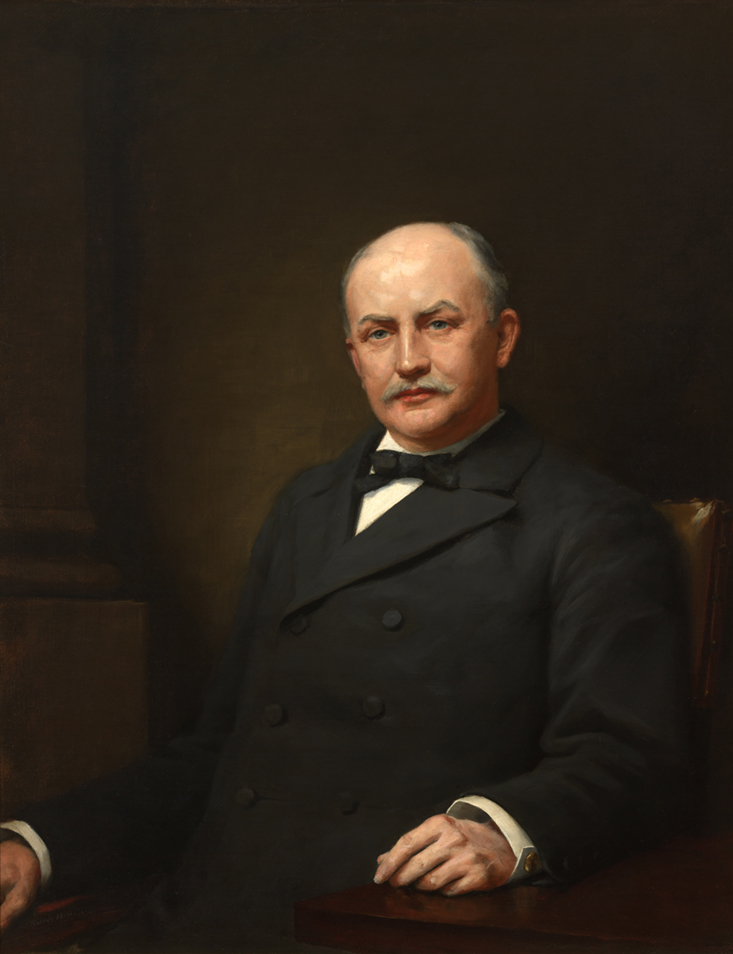
| | Majority party | Minority party |
|---|---|---|
| Leader | Thomas B. Reed | Charles F. Crisp |
| Party | Republican | Democratic |
| Leader's seat | Maine 1st | Georgia 3rd |
| Seats won | 6 | 2 |
| Seat change | 0 | ▲1 |
| | Third party | Fourth party |
| Party | Populist | Silver |
| Seats won | 0 | 0 |
| Seat change | Steady | Steady |

There were nine elections to the United States House of Representatives in 1895, during 53rd United States Congress and the 54th United States Congress. Republicans held six seats, won one, and lost one. Democrats, the party of President Grover Cleveland, held one seat and gained one seat. Democrats held the House majority in the 53rd Congress and Republicans held it in the 54th.

Eight of the elections were special elections to fill vacant seats and one was an initial election for a seat in the new state of Utah. Five of the vacant seats were caused by the incumbent's death and two were caused by the incumbent's resignation.

Elections are listed by date and district.

== Special elections ==
=== 53rd United States Congress ===
In Pennsylvania's 15th District, incumbent Myron B. Wright was elected to the 54th Congress on November 6, 1894, but died one week later. Edwin Jorden was elected to serve out the remainder of Wright's term in the 53rd Congress, which ended March 4. Jorden's, who therefor only served for ten days, was the only House election for the 53rd Congress held in 1895.

| District | Incumbent | | | This race | |
| District | Member | Party | First elected | Results | Candidates |
|---|---|---|---|---|---|
| Pennsylvania 15 | Myron B. Wright | Republican | 1888 | Incumbent died November 13, 1894. New member elected February 23, 1895 and seated February 23, 1895 to finish incumbent's term in the 53rd Congress, but not the 54th. Republican hold. | ▌ ✓ Edwin J. Jorden (Republican) 64.16%; ▌Rhamanthus M. Stocker (Democratic) 31.92%; ▌Charles P. Shaw (Populist) 3.47%; ▌Henry W. Champlin (Prohibition) 0.44% |

=== 54th United States Congress ===
James H. Codding was elected to serve the term Wright was originally elected to serve in the 54th Congress.

In New York's tenth District, Republican Andrew J. Campbell defeated the incumbent Republican on November 6, 1894, but died before taking office on March 4. His Democratic successor was elected November 5, 1895.

| District | Incumbent | | | This race | |
| District | Member | Party | First elected | Results | Candidates |
|---|---|---|---|---|---|
| Pennsylvania 15 | Myron B. Wright | Republican | 1888 | Incumbent elected to 54th Congress but died November 13, 1894. New member elected February 19, 1895 and seated November 5, 1895. Republican hold. | ▌ ✓ James H. Codding (Republican) 66.02%; ▌Rhamanthus M. Stocker (Democratic) 30.24%; ▌Charles P. Shaw (Populist) 3.30%; ▌Henry W. Champlin (Prohibition) 0.44% |
| Michigan 3 | Julius C. Burrows | Republican | 1884 | Incumbent resigned January 23, 1895, when elected U.S. senator. New member elected April 1, 1895 and seated December 2, 1895. Republican hold. | ▌ ✓ Alfred Milnes (Republican) 51.71%; ▌Albert May Todd (Fusion) 47.50%; ▌Patrick H. Kilkey (Democratic) 0.78% |
| Illinois 10 | Philip S. Post | Republican | 1886 | Incumbent died January 6, 1895. New member elected April 2, 1895 and seated December 2, 1895. Republican hold. | ▌ ✓ George W. Prince (Republican) 65.95%; ▌Fred K. Bastian (Democratic) 25.36%; ▌E. K. Kempster (Populist) 8.69% |
| Georgia 10 | James C. C. Black | Democratic | 1892 | Incumbent resigned March 4, 1895. Incumbent was subsequently elected October 2, 1895 and seated December 2, 1895. Democratic hold. Election was unsuccessfully challenged. | ▌ ✓ James C. C. Black (Democratic) 54.16%; ▌Thomas E. Watson (Populist) 45.84% |
| Illinois 18 | Frederick Remann | Republican | 1894 | Incumbent died July 14, 1895. New member elected November 5, 1895 and seated December 2, 1895. Republican hold. | ▌ ✓ William F. L. Hadley (Republican) 51.77%; ▌Edward Lane (Democratic) 40.77%; ▌James F. Culp (Populist) 4.85%; ▌M. M. Cooper (Prohibition) 2.61% |
| New York 10 | Vacant | | | Representative-elect Andrew J. Campbell (R) died before the start of Congress. New member elected November 5, 1895 and seated December 2, 1895. Democratic gain. | ▌ ✓ Amos J. Cummings (Democratic) 56.59%; ▌Robert A. Greaben (Republican) 37.83%; ▌William J. Browne (Empire State Dem.) 2.97%; ▌Charles G. Teche (Socialist Labor) 1.67%; ▌George Wetham (Prohibition) 0.69%; ▌Edward D. Foote (Populist) 0.26% |
| Massachusetts 6 | William Cogswell | Republican | 1886 | Incumbent died May 22, 1895. New member elected November 5, 1895 and seated December 2, 1895. Republican hold. | ▌ ✓ William H. Moody (Republican) 66.28%; ▌Harvey N. Shepard (Democratic) 25.60%; ▌Wilbert O. Dwinell (Populist) 5.72%; ▌Michael T. Berry (Socialist Labor) 2.40% |

Utah became a state on January 4, 1896. The state sent one person to the House.

| District | Incumbent | | | This race | |
| District | Member | Party | First elected | Results | Candidates |
|---|---|---|---|---|---|
| Utah at-large | None (new state) | | | New seat. New member elected November 5, 1895 and seated January 4, 1896, upon statehood. Republican gain. | ▌ ✓ Clarence E. Allen (Republican) 49.69%; ▌Brigham H. Roberts (Democratic) 47.53%; ▌J. Hogan (Prohibition) 2.78% |
