= 54th United States Congress =

1895-1897 U.S. Congress

←	53rd	55th	→
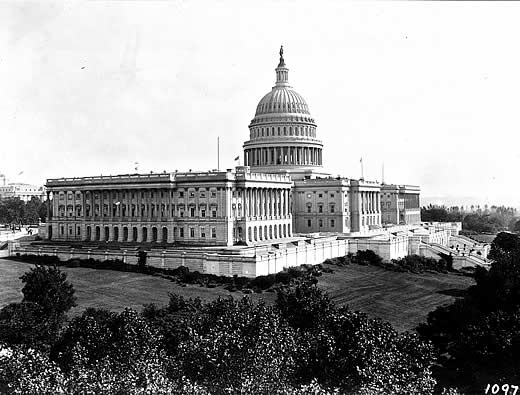
- United States Capitol (1906)

Overview
- Legislative body: United States Congress
- Jurisdiction: United States
- Term: March 4, 1895 – March 4, 1897

Senate
- Members: 90
- President: Adlai E. Stevenson (D)
- President pro tempore: William P. Frye (R)
- Party control: Republican (plurality)

House of Representatives
- Members: 357 representatives 4 non-voting delegates
- Speaker: Thomas B. Reed (R)
- Party control: Republican

Sessions
- 1st: December 2, 1895 – June 11, 1896
- 2nd: December 7, 1896 – March 3, 1897

The 54th United States Congress was a meeting of the legislative branch of the United States federal government, consisting of the United States Senate and the United States House of Representatives. It met in Washington, D.C., from March 4, 1895, to March 4, 1897, during the last two years of Grover Cleveland's second presidency. The apportionment of seats in the House of Representatives was based on the 1890 United States census. The House had a Republican majority, and the Republicans were the largest party in the Senate.

== Major events ==
- May 27, 1896: 1896 St. Louis–East St. Louis tornado: The costliest and third deadliest tornado in U.S. history levels a mile wide swath of downtown St. Louis, Missouri, incurring over $10,000,000 (over $375 mil. in 2025) in damages at contemporaneous prices, killing more than 255 and injuring over 1,000 people.
- November 3, 1896: U.S. presidential election, 1896: Republican William McKinley defeats Democratic candidate William Jennings Bryan. This is regarded as a realigning election, that ended the old Third Party System and started the Fourth Party System
- February 19, 1897: United States Copyright Office established as a department in the Library of Congress.

== Major legislation ==
- May 21, 1896: Oil Pipe Line Act, ch. 212, 29 Stat. 127 (43 U.S.C. § 962 et seq.)
- May 22, 1896: Condemned Cannon Act, 29 Stat. 133
- May 28, 1896: United States Commissioners Act, 29 Stat. 184
- June 1, 1896: Married Women's Rights Act (District of Columbia), 29 Stat. 193
- June 6, 1896: Filled Cheese Act, 29 Stat. 253
- January 13, 1897: Stock Reservoir Act, 29 Stat. 484, (43 U.S.C. § 952 et seq.)
- March 2, 1897: Tea Importation Act, 29 Stat. 604, (21 U.S.C. § 41 et seq.)

== States admitted ==
- January 4, 1896: Utah was admitted as the 45th state.

== Party summary ==
This count identifies party affiliations at the beginning of the first session of this Congress, and includes members from vacancies and newly admitted states, when they were first seated. Changes resulting from subsequent replacements are shown below in the "Changes in membership" section.

=== Senate ===
	Party (shading shows control)					Total	Vacant
	Democratic (D)	Populist (P)	Republican (R)	Silver Republican (SR)	Silver (S)	Total	Vacant
End of previous congress	43	3	41	0	1	88	0
Begin	39	4	42	0	2	87	1
End	40	4	44	0	2	90	0
Final voting share	44.4%	4.4%	48.9%	0.0%	2.2%		
Beginning of next congress	33	5	43	5	2	88	2

=== House of Representatives ===
	Party (shading shows control)					Total	Vacant
	Democratic (D)	Populist (P)	Republican (R)	Silver (S)	Other (O)	Total	Vacant
End of previous congress	214	11	123	1	1	350	6
Begin	104	7	240	1	0	352	4
End	94	9	252	1	0	356	1
Final voting share	26.4%	2.5%	70.8%	0.3%	0.0%		
Beginning of next congress	126	22	202	1	4 (Note: Silver Republican & Independent.)	355	2

== Leadership ==
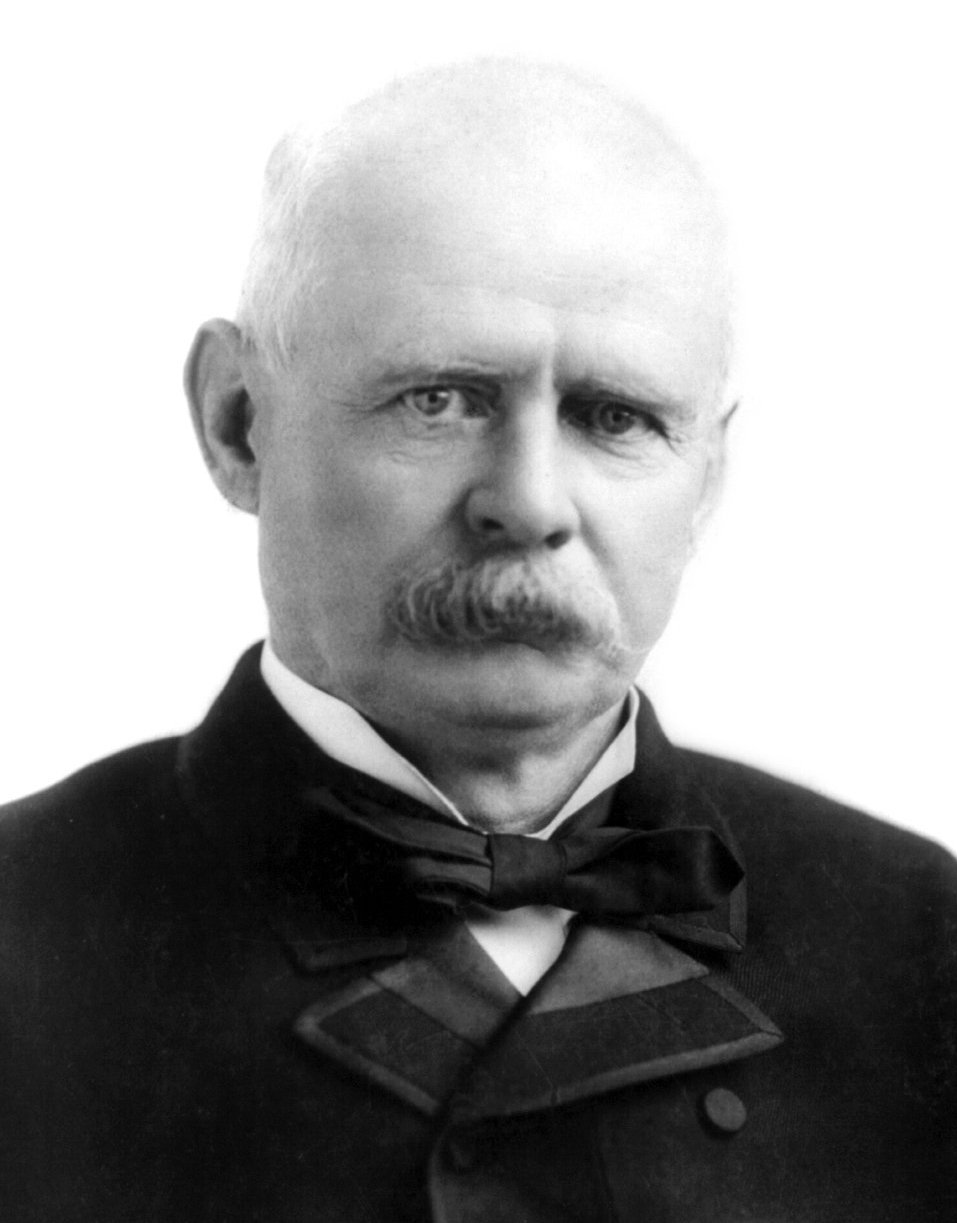
President of the Senate Adlai E. Stevenson

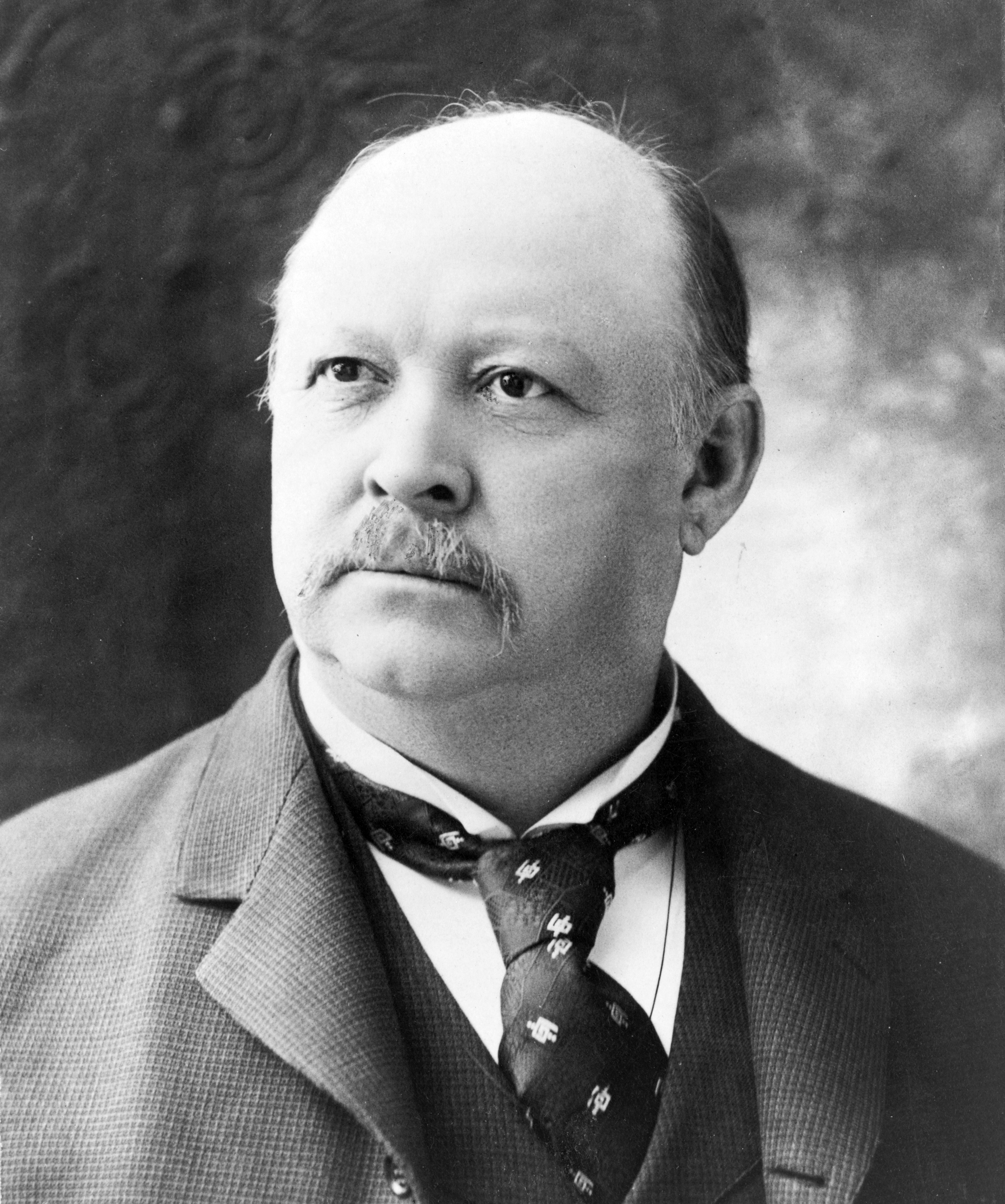
Speaker of the House Thomas B. Reed

=== Senate ===
- President: Adlai E. Stevenson (D)
- President pro tempore: William P. Frye (R)

==== Majority (Republican) leadership ====
- Republican Conference Chairman: John Sherman

==== Minority (Democratic) leadership ====
- Democratic Caucus Chairman: Arthur P. Gorman

=== House of Representatives ===
- Speaker: Thomas B. Reed (R)
- Minority Leader: Charles F. Crisp (D)

==== Majority (Republican) leadership ====
- Republican Conference Chairman: Charles H. Grosvenor
- Republican Campaign Committee Chairman: Joseph W. Babcock

==== Minority (Democratic) leadership ====
- Democratic Caucus Chairman: David B. Culberson
- Democratic Campaign Committee Chairman: Charles James Faulkner

== Members ==
This list is arranged by chamber, then by state. Senators are listed by class, and representatives are listed by district.

Skip to House of Representatives, below

=== Senate ===
Senators were elected by the state legislatures every two years, with one-third beginning new six-year terms with each Congress. Preceding the names in the list below are Senate class numbers, which indicate the cycle of their election. In this Congress, Class 1 meant their term began in the last Congress, requiring re-election in 1898; Class 2 meant their term began in this Congress, requiring re-election in 1900; and Class 3 meant their term ended in this Congress, requiring re-election in 1896.

==== Alabama ====
▌2. John T. Morgan (D)
▌3. James L. Pugh (D)

==== Arkansas ====
▌2. James H. Berry (D)
▌3. James K. Jones (D)

==== California ====
▌1. Stephen M. White (D)
▌3. George C. Perkins (R)

==== Colorado ====
▌2. Edward O. Wolcott (R)
▌3. Henry M. Teller (R)

==== Connecticut ====
▌1. Joseph R. Hawley (R)
▌3. Orville H. Platt (R)

==== Delaware ====
▌1. George Gray (D)
▌2. Richard R. Kenney (D), from January 19, 1897

==== Florida ====
▌1. Samuel Pasco (D)
▌3. Wilkinson Call (D)

==== Georgia ====
▌2. Augustus O. Bacon (D)
▌3. John B. Gordon (D)

==== Idaho ====
▌2. George L. Shoup (R)
▌3. Fred T. Dubois (R)

==== Illinois ====
▌2. Shelby M. Cullom (R)
▌3. John McAuley Palmer (D)

==== Indiana ====
▌1. David Turpie (D)
▌3. Daniel W. Voorhees (D)

==== Iowa ====
▌2. John H. Gear (R)
▌3. William B. Allison (R)

==== Kansas ====
▌2. Lucien Baker (R)
▌3. William A. Peffer (P)

==== Kentucky ====
▌2. William Lindsay (D)
▌3. Joseph C. S. Blackburn (D)

==== Louisiana ====
▌2. Donelson Caffery (D)
▌3. Newton C. Blanchard (D)

==== Maine ====
▌1. Eugene Hale (R)
▌2. William P. Frye (R)

==== Maryland ====
▌1. Arthur Pue Gorman (D)
▌3. Charles H. Gibson (D)

==== Massachusetts ====
▌1. Henry Cabot Lodge (R)
▌2. George F. Hoar (R)

==== Michigan ====
▌1. Julius C. Burrows (R)
▌2. James McMillan (R)

==== Minnesota ====
▌1. Cushman K. Davis (R)
▌2. Knute Nelson (R)

==== Mississippi ====
▌1. James Z. George (D)
▌2. Edward C. Walthall (D)

==== Missouri ====
▌1. Francis Cockrell (D)
▌3. George G. Vest (D)

==== Montana ====
▌1. Lee Mantle (R)
▌2. Thomas H. Carter (R)

==== Nebraska ====
▌1. William V. Allen (P)
▌2. John M. Thurston (R)

==== Nevada ====
▌1. William M. Stewart (S)
▌3. John P. Jones (S)

==== New Hampshire ====
▌2. William E. Chandler (R)
▌3. Jacob H. Gallinger (R)

==== New Jersey ====
▌1. James Smith Jr. (D)
▌2. William J. Sewell (R)

==== New York ====
▌1. Edward Murphy Jr. (D)
▌3. David B. Hill (D)

==== North Carolina ====
▌2. Marion Butler (P)
▌3. Jeter C. Pritchard (R)

==== North Dakota ====
▌1. William N. Roach (D)
▌3. Henry C. Hansbrough (R)

==== Ohio ====
▌1. John Sherman (R)
▌3. Calvin S. Brice (D)

==== Oregon ====
▌2. George W. McBride (R)
▌3. John H. Mitchell (R)

==== Pennsylvania ====
▌1. Matthew S. Quay (R)
▌3. J. Donald Cameron (R)

==== Rhode Island ====
▌1. Nelson W. Aldrich (R)
▌2. George P. Wetmore (R)

==== South Carolina ====
▌2. Benjamin R. Tillman (D)
▌3. John L. M. Irby (D)

==== South Dakota ====
▌2. Richard F. Pettigrew (R)
▌3. James H. Kyle (P)

==== Tennessee ====
▌1. William B. Bate (D)
▌2. Isham G. Harris (D)

==== Texas ====
▌1. Roger Q. Mills (D)
▌2. Horace Chilton (D)

==== Utah ====
▌1. Frank J. Cannon (R), from January 22, 1896
▌3. Arthur Brown (R), from January 22, 1896

==== Vermont ====
▌1. Redfield Proctor (R)
▌3. Justin S. Morrill (R)

==== Virginia ====
▌1. John W. Daniel (D)
▌2. Thomas S. Martin (D)

==== Washington ====
▌1. John L. Wilson (R)
▌3. Watson C. Squire (R)

==== West Virginia ====
▌1. Charles J. Faulkner Jr. (D)
▌2. Stephen B. Elkins (R)

==== Wisconsin ====
▌1. John L. Mitchell (D)
▌3. William F. Vilas (D)

==== Wyoming ====
▌1. Clarence D. Clark (R)
▌2. Francis E. Warren (R)

Senators' party membership by state at the opening of the 54th Congress in March 1895. The green stripes represent Populists. 2 Democrats 1 Democrat and 1 Republican 2 Republicans 2 Silver

=== House of Representatives ===
The names of representatives are preceded by their district numbers.

==== Alabama ====
▌1. Richard H. Clarke (D)
▌2. Jesse F. Stallings (D)
▌3. George P. Harrison (D)
▌4. Gaston A. Robbins (D), until March 13, 1896

▌William F. Aldrich (R), from March 13, 1896

▌5. James E. Cobb (D), until April 21, 1896

▌Albert T. Goodwyn (P), from April 22, 1896

▌6. John H. Bankhead (D)
▌7. Milford W. Howard (P)
▌8. Joseph Wheeler (D)
▌9. Oscar Underwood (D), until June 9, 1896

▌Truman H. Aldrich (R), from June 9, 1896

==== Arkansas ====
▌1. Philip D. McCulloch Jr. (D)
▌2. John S. Little (D)
▌3. Thomas C. McRae (D)
▌4. William L. Terry (D)
▌5. Hugh A. Dinsmore (D)
▌6. Robert Neill (D)

==== California ====
▌1. John A. Barham (R)
▌2. Grove L. Johnson (R)
▌3. Samuel G. Hilborn (R)
▌4. James G. Maguire (D)
▌5. Eugene F. Loud (R)
▌6. James McLachlan (R)
▌7. William W. Bowers (R)

==== Colorado ====
▌1. John F. Shafroth (R)
▌2. John C. Bell (P)

==== Connecticut ====
▌1. E. Stevens Henry (R)
▌2. Nehemiah D. Sperry (R)
▌3. Charles A. Russell (R)
▌4. Ebenezer J. Hill (R)

==== Delaware ====
▌At-large. Jonathan S. Willis (R)

==== Florida ====
▌1. Stephen M. Sparkman (D)
▌2. Charles M. Cooper (D)

==== Georgia ====
▌1. Rufus E. Lester (D)
▌2. Benjamin E. Russell (D)
▌3. Charles F. Crisp (D), until October 23, 1896

▌Charles R. Crisp (D), from December 19, 1896

▌4. Charles L. Moses (D)
▌5. Leonidas F. Livingston (D)
▌6. Charles L. Bartlett (D)
▌7. John W. Maddox (D)
▌8. Thomas G. Lawson (D)
▌9. Farish C. Tate (D)
▌10. James C. C. Black (D), until March 4, 1895

▌James C. C. Black (D), from October 2, 1895

▌11. Henry G. Turner (D)

==== Idaho ====
▌At-large. Edgar Wilson (R)

==== Illinois ====
▌1. J. Frank Aldrich (R)
▌2. William Lorimer (R)
▌3. Lawrence E. McGann (D), until December 27, 1895

▌Hugh R. Belknap (R), from December 27, 1895

▌4. Charles W. Woodman (R)
▌5. George E. White (R)
▌6. Edward D. Cooke (R)
▌7. George E. Foss (R)
▌8. Albert J. Hopkins (R)
▌9. Robert R. Hitt (R)
▌10. George W. Prince (R), from December 2, 1895
▌11. Walter Reeves (R)
▌12. Joseph G. Cannon (R)
▌13. Vespasian Warner (R)
▌14. Joseph V. Graff (R)
▌15. Benjamin F. Marsh (R)
▌16. Finis E. Downing (D), until June 5, 1896

▌John I. Rinaker (R), from June 5, 1896

▌17. James A. Connolly (R)
▌18. Frederick Remann (R), until July 14, 1895

▌William F. L. Hadley (R), from December 2, 1895

▌19. Benson Wood (R)
▌20. Orlando Burrell (R)
▌21. Everett J. Murphy (R)
▌22. George Washington Smith (R)

==== Indiana ====
▌1. James A. Hemenway (R)
▌2. Alexander M. Hardy (R)
▌3. Robert J. Tracewell (R)
▌4. James E. Watson (R)
▌5. Jesse Overstreet (R)
▌6. Henry U. Johnson (R)
▌7. Charles L. Henry (R)
▌8. George W. Faris (R)
▌9. J. Frank Hanly (R)
▌10. Jethro A. Hatch (R)
▌11. George W. Steele (R)
▌12. Jacob D. Leighty (R)
▌13. Lemuel W. Royse (R)

==== Iowa ====
▌1. Samuel M. Clark (R)
▌2. George M. Curtis (R)
▌3. David B. Henderson (R)
▌4. Thomas Updegraff (R)
▌5. Robert G. Cousins (R)
▌6. John F. Lacey (R)
▌7. John A. T. Hull (R)
▌8. William P. Hepburn (R)
▌9. Alva L. Hager (R)
▌10. Jonathan P. Dolliver (R)
▌11. George D. Perkins (R)

==== Kansas ====
▌1. Case Broderick (R)
▌2. Orrin L. Miller (R)
▌3. Snyder S. Kirkpatrick (R)
▌4. Charles Curtis (R)
▌5. William A. Calderhead (R)
▌6. William Baker (P)
▌7. Chester I. Long (R)
▌At-large. Richard W. Blue (R)

==== Kentucky ====
▌1. John K. Hendrick (D)
▌2. John D. Clardy (D)
▌3. W. Godfrey Hunter (R)
▌4. John W. Lewis (R)
▌5. Walter Evans (R)
▌6. Albert S. Berry (D)
▌7. William C. Owens (D)
▌8. James B. McCreary (D)
▌9. Samuel J. Pugh (R)
▌10. Joseph M. Kendall (D), until February 18, 1897

▌Nathan T. Hopkins (R), from February 18, 1897

▌11. David G. Colson (R)

==== Louisiana ====
▌1. Adolph Meyer (D)
▌2. Charles F. Buck (D)
▌3. Andrew Price (D)
▌4. Henry W. Ogden (D)
▌5. Charles J. Boatner (D), until March 20, 1896

▌Charles J. Boatner (D), from June 10, 1896

▌6. Samuel M. Robertson (D)

==== Maine ====
▌1. Thomas B. Reed (R)
▌2. Nelson Dingley Jr. (R)
▌3. Seth L. Milliken (R)
▌4. Charles A. Boutelle (R)

==== Maryland ====
▌1. Joshua W. Miles (D)
▌2. William B. Baker (R)
▌3. Henry W. Rusk (D)
▌4. John K. Cowen (D)
▌5. Charles E. Coffin (R)
▌6. George L. Wellington (R)

==== Massachusetts ====
▌1. Ashley B. Wright (R)
▌2. Frederick H. Gillett (R)
▌3. Joseph H. Walker (R)
▌4. Lewis D. Apsley (R)
▌5. William S. Knox (R)
▌6. William Cogswell (R), until May 22, 1895

▌William H. Moody (R), from November 5, 1895

▌7. William E. Barrett (R)
▌8. Samuel W. McCall (R)
▌9. John F. Fitzgerald (D)
▌10. Harrison H. Atwood (R)
▌11. William F. Draper (R)
▌12. Elijah A. Morse (R)
▌13. John Simpkins (R)

==== Michigan ====
▌1. John B. Corliss (R)
▌2. George Spalding (R)
▌3. Alfred Milnes (R), from December 2, 1895
▌4. Henry F. Thomas (R)
▌5. William Alden Smith (R)
▌6. David D. Aitken (R)
▌7. Horace G. Snover (R)
▌8. William S. Linton (R)
▌9. Roswell P. Bishop (R)
▌10. Rousseau O. Crump (R)
▌11. John Avery (R)
▌12. Samuel M. Stephenson (R)

==== Minnesota ====
▌1. James Albertus Tawney (R)
▌2. James T. McCleary (R)
▌3. Joel Heatwole (R)
▌4. Andrew R. Kiefer (R)
▌5. Loren Fletcher (R)
▌6. Charles A. Towne (R)
▌7. Frank Eddy (R)

==== Mississippi ====
▌1. John M. Allen (D)
▌2. John C. Kyle (D)
▌3. Thomas C. Catchings (D)
▌4. Hernando D. Money (D)
▌5. John Sharp Williams (D)
▌6. Walter McKennon Denny (D)
▌7. James G. Spencer (D)

==== Missouri ====
▌1. Charles N. Clark (R)
▌2. Uriel S. Hall (D)
▌3. Alexander M. Dockery (D)
▌4. George C. Crowther (R)
▌5. John C. Tarsney (D), until February 27, 1896

▌Robert T. Van Horn (R), from February 27, 1896

▌6. David A. De Armond (D)
▌7. John P. Tracey (R)
▌8. Joel D. Hubbard (R)
▌9. William M. Treloar (R)
▌10. Richard Bartholdt (R)
▌11. Charles F. Joy (R)
▌12. Seth W. Cobb (D)
▌13. John H. Raney (R)
▌14. Norman A. Mozley (R)
▌15. Charles G. Burton (R)

==== Montana ====
▌At-large. Charles S. Hartman (R)

==== Nebraska ====
▌1. Jesse B. Strode (R)
▌2. David H. Mercer (R)
▌3. George D. Meiklejohn (R)
▌4. Eugene J. Hainer (R)
▌5. William E. Andrews (R)
▌6. Omer M. Kem (P)

==== Nevada ====
▌At-large. Francis G. Newlands (S)

==== New Hampshire ====
▌1. Cyrus A. Sulloway (R)
▌2. Henry M. Baker (R)

==== New Jersey ====
▌1. Henry C. Loudenslager (R)
▌2. John J. Gardner (R)
▌3. Benjamin F. Howell (R)
▌4. Mahlon Pitney (R)
▌5. James F. Stewart (R)
▌6. Richard Wayne Parker (R)
▌7. Thomas McEwan Jr. (R)
▌8. Charles N. Fowler (R)

==== New York ====
▌1. Richard Cunningham McCormick (R)
▌2. Denis M. Hurley (R)
▌3. Francis H. Wilson (R)
▌4. Israel F. Fischer (R)
▌5. Charles G. Bennett (R)
▌6. James R. Howe (R)
▌7. Franklin Bartlett (D)
▌8. James J. Walsh (D), until June 2, 1896

▌John M. Mitchell (R), from June 2, 1896

▌9. Henry C. Miner (D)
▌10. Amos J. Cummings (D) from November 5, 1895
▌11. William Sulzer (D)
▌12. George B. McClellan Jr. (D)
▌13. Richard C. Shannon (R)
▌14. Lemuel E. Quigg (R)
▌15. Philip B. Low (R)
▌16. Benjamin L. Fairchild (R)
▌17. Benjamin Odell (R)
▌18. Jacob LeFever (R)
▌19. Frank S. Black (R), until January 7, 1897
▌20. George N. Southwick (R)
▌21. David F. Wilber (R)
▌22. Newton M. Curtis (R)
▌23. Wallace T. Foote Jr. (R)
▌24. Charles A. Chickering (R)
▌25. James S. Sherman (R)
▌26. George W. Ray (R)
▌27. Theodore L. Poole (R)
▌28. Sereno E. Payne (R)
▌29. Charles W. Gillet (R)
▌30. James W. Wadsworth (R)
▌31. Henry C. Brewster (R)
▌32. Rowland B. Mahany (R)
▌33. Charles Daniels (R)
▌34. Warren B. Hooker (R)

==== North Carolina ====
▌1. Harry Skinner (P)
▌2. Frederick A. Woodard (D)
▌3. John G. Shaw (D)
▌4. William F. Strowd (P)
▌5. Thomas Settle III (R)
▌6. James A. Lockhart (D), until June 5, 1896

▌Charles H. Martin (P), from June 5, 1896

▌7. Alonzo C. Shuford (P)
▌8. Romulus Z. Linney (R)
▌9. Richmond Pearson (R)

==== North Dakota ====
▌At-large. Martin N. Johnson (R)

==== Ohio ====
▌1. Charles P. Taft (R)
▌2. Jacob H. Bromwell (R)
▌3. Paul J. Sorg (D)
▌4. Fernando C. Layton (D)
▌5. Francis B. De Witt (R)
▌6. George W. Hulick (R)
▌7. George W. Wilson (R)
▌8. Luther M. Strong (R)
▌9. James H. Southard (R)
▌10. Lucien J. Fenton (R)
▌11. Charles H. Grosvenor (R)
▌12. David K. Watson (R)
▌13. Stephen R. Harris (R)
▌14. Winfield S. Kerr (R)
▌15. Henry C. Van Voorhis (R)
▌16. Lorenzo Danford (R)
▌17. Addison S. McClure (R)
▌18. Robert W. Tayler (R)
▌19. Stephen A. Northway (R)
▌20. Clifton B. Beach (R)
▌21. Theodore E. Burton (R)

==== Oregon ====
▌1. Binger Hermann (R)
▌2. William R. Ellis (R)

==== Pennsylvania ====
▌1. Henry H. Bingham (R)
▌2. Robert Adams Jr. (R)
▌3. Frederick Halterman (R)
▌4. John E. Reyburn (R)
▌5. Alfred C. Harmer (R)
▌6. John B. Robinson (R)
▌7. Irving P. Wanger (R)
▌8. Joseph J. Hart (D)
▌9. Constantine J. Erdman (D)
▌10. Marriott Brosius (R)
▌11. Joseph A. Scranton (R)
▌12. John Leisenring (R)
▌13. Charles N. Brumm (R)
▌14. Ephraim M. Woomer (R)
▌15. James H. Codding (R), from November 5, 1895
▌16. Fred C. Leonard (R)
▌17. Monroe H. Kulp (R)
▌18. Thaddeus M. Mahon (R)
▌19. James A. Stahle (R)
▌20. Josiah D. Hicks (R)
▌21. Daniel B. Heiner (R)
▌22. John Dalzell (R)
▌23. William A. Stone (R)
▌24. Ernest F. Acheson (R)
▌25. Thomas W. Phillips (R)
▌26. Matthew Griswold (R)
▌27. Charles W. Stone (R)
▌28. William C. Arnold (R)
▌At-large. Galusha A. Grow (R)
▌At-large. George F. Huff (R)

==== Rhode Island ====
▌1. Melville Bull (R)
▌2. Warren O. Arnold (R)

==== South Carolina ====
▌1. William Elliott (D), until June 4, 1896

▌George W. Murray (R), from June 4, 1896

▌2. William J. Talbert (D)
▌3. Asbury C. Latimer (D)
▌4. Stanyarne Wilson (D)
▌5. Thomas J. Strait (D)
▌6. John L. McLaurin (D)
▌7. J. William Stokes (D), until June 1, 1896

▌J. William Stokes (D), from November 3, 1896

==== South Dakota ====
Both representatives were elected statewide on a general ticket.
(2 Republicans)

▌At-large. Robert J. Gamble (R)
▌At-large. John A. Pickler (R)

==== Tennessee ====
▌1. William C. Anderson (R)
▌2. Henry R. Gibson (R)
▌3. Foster V. Brown (R)
▌4. Benton McMillin (D)
▌5. James D. Richardson (D)
▌6. Joseph E. Washington (D)
▌7. Nicholas N. Cox (D)
▌8. John E. McCall (R)
▌9. James C. McDearmon (D)
▌10. Josiah Patterson (D)

==== Texas ====
▌1. Joseph C. Hutcheson (D)
▌2. Samuel B. Cooper (D)
▌3. Charles H. Yoakum (D)
▌4. David B. Culberson (D)
▌5. Joseph W. Bailey (D)
▌6. Joseph Abbott (D)
▌7. George C. Pendleton (D)
▌8. Charles K. Bell (D)
▌9. Joseph D. Sayers (D)
▌10. Miles Crowley (D)
▌11. William H. Crain (D), until February 10, 1896

▌Rudolph Kleberg (D), from April 7, 1896

▌12. George H. Noonan (R)
▌13. Jeremiah V. Cockrell (D)

==== Utah ====
▌At-large. Clarence E. Allen (R), from January 4, 1896

==== Vermont ====
▌1. H. Henry Powers (R)
▌2. William W. Grout (R)

==== Virginia ====
▌1. William A. Jones (D)
▌2. D. Gardiner Tyler (D)
▌3. Tazewell Ellett (D)
▌4. William R. McKenney (D), until May 2, 1896

▌Robert T. Thorp (R), from May 2, 1896

▌5. Claude A. Swanson (D)
▌6. Peter J. Otey (D)
▌7. Smith S. Turner (D)
▌8. Elisha E. Meredith (D)
▌9. James A. Walker (R)
▌10. Henry St. George Tucker III (D)

==== Washington ====
Both representatives were elected statewide on a general ticket.
(2 Republicans)

▌At-large. William H. Doolittle (R)
▌At-large. Samuel C. Hyde (R)

==== West Virginia ====
▌1. Blackburn B. Dovener (R)
▌2. Alston G. Dayton (R)
▌3. James H. Huling (R)
▌4. Warren Miller (R)

==== Wisconsin ====
▌1. Henry Allen Cooper (R)
▌2. Edward Sauerhering (R)
▌3. Joseph W. Babcock (R)
▌4. Theobald Otjen (R)
▌5. Samuel S. Barney (R)
▌6. Samuel A. Cook (R)
▌7. Michael Griffin (R)
▌8. Edward S. Minor (R)
▌9. Alexander Stewart (R)
▌10. John J. Jenkins (R)

==== Wyoming ====
▌At-large. Frank W. Mondell (R)

==== Non-voting members ====
▌Arizona Territory. Nathan O. Murphy (R)
▌New Mexico Territory. Thomas B. Catron (R)
▌Oklahoma Territory. Dennis T. Flynn (R)
▌Utah Territory. Frank J. Cannon (R), until January 4, 1896

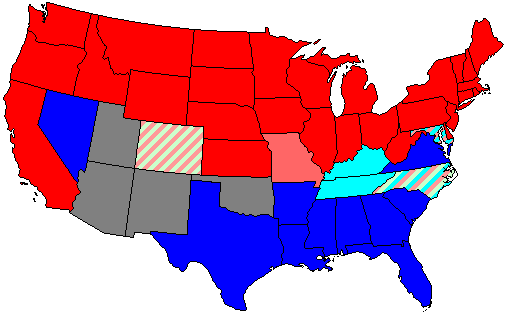
House seats by party holding plurality in state: 80+% to 100% Democratic / 80+% to 100% Republican; 60+% to 80% Democratic / 60+% to 80% Republican; Up to 60% Democratic / Up to 60% Republican

== Changes in membership ==
The count below reflects changes from the beginning of the first session of this Congress.

=== Senate ===
Two seats were added when Utah was admitted and one seat was filled late.

Senate changes
State (class)	Vacated by	Reason for change	Successor	Date of successor's formal installation (Note: When seated or oath administered, not necessarily when service began.)					
Utah (1)	New seat	State was admitted to the Union	Frank J. Cannon (R)	January 22, 1896	New seat	Utah (1)	State was admitted to the Union	Arthur Brown (R)	January 22, 1896
Delaware (2)	Vacant	Legislature had failed to elect. A successor was eventually elected	Richard R. Kenney (D)	January 19, 1897					

=== House of Representatives ===
There were 4 deaths, 2 resignations, 13 election challenges, 1 new seat, and 4 seats vacant from the previous Congress. Democrats had a 10-seat net loss; Republicans had a 12-seat net gain; and Populists had a 2-seat net gain.

House changes
District	Vacated by	Reason for change	Successor	Date of successor's formal installation
New York 10	Vacant	Representative-elect Andrew J. Campbell died before the start of Congress. New member elected November 5, 1895.	Amos J. Cummings (D)	November 5, 1895
Illinois 10	Vacant	Philip S. Post (R) was re-elected, but died before this Congress. New member elected December 2, 1895.	George W. Prince (R)	December 2, 1895
Michigan 3	Vacant	Julius C. Burrows (R) was re-elected, but resigned in the previous Congress to serve in the Senate. New member elected December 2, 1895.	Alfred Milnes (R)	December 2, 1895
Pennsylvania 15	Vacant	Rep-elect Myron B. Wright died in office. New member elected November 5, 1895.	James H. Codding (R)	November 5, 1895
Utah Territory at-large	Frank J. Cannon (R)	Seat eliminated January 4, 1896, upon statehood.	Seat eliminated	
Utah at-large	New seat	State was admitted to the Union. New member elected November 5, 1895.	Clarence E. Allen (R)	January 4, 1896
Georgia 10	James C. C. Black (D)	Resigned March 4, 1895. Incumbent was subsequently re-elected October 2, 1895.	James C. C. Black (D)	October 2, 1895
Massachusetts 6	William Cogswell (R)	Died May 22, 1895. New member elected November 5, 1895.	William H. Moody (R)	November 5, 1895
Illinois 18	Frederick Remann (R)	Died July 14, 1895. New member elected December 2, 1895.	William F. L. Hadley (R)	December 2, 1895
Illinois 3	Lawrence E. McGann (D)	Election was successfully challenged December 27, 1895.	Hugh R. Belknap (R)	December 27, 1895
Texas 11	William H. Crain (D)	Died February 10, 1896. New member elected April 7, 1896.	Rudolph Kleberg (D)	April 7, 1896
Missouri 5	John C. Tarsney (D)	Election was successfully challenged February 27, 1896.	Robert T. Van Horn (R)	February 27, 1896
Alabama 4	Gaston A. Robbins (D)	Election was successfully challenged March 13, 1896.	William F. Aldrich (R)	March 13, 1896
Virginia 4	William R. McKenney (D)	Election was successfully challenged May 2, 1896.	Robert T. Thorp (R)	May 2, 1896
Louisiana 5	Charles J. Boatner (D)	Election was challenged and declared vacant March 20, 1896. Incumbent was subsequently elected June 10, 1896.	Charles J. Boatner (D)	June 10, 1896
Alabama 5	James E. Cobb (D)	Election was successfully challenged April 21, 1896.	Albert T. Goodwyn (P)	April 22, 1896
South Carolina 7	J. William Stokes (D)	Seat declared vacant June 1, 1896. Incumbent was subsequently elected November 3, 1896.	J. William Stokes (D)	November 3, 1896
New York 8	James J. Walsh (D)	Election was successfully challenged June 2, 1896.	John M. Mitchell (R)	June 2, 1896
South Carolina 1	William Elliott (D)	Election was successfully challenged June 4, 1896.	George W. Murray (R)	June 4, 1896
Illinois 16	Finis E. Downing (D)	Election was successfully challenged June 5, 1896.	John I. Rinaker (R)	June 5, 1896
North Carolina 6	James A. Lockhart (D)	Election was successfully challenged June 5, 1896.	Charles H. Martin (P)	June 5, 1896
Alabama 9	Oscar W. Underwood (D)	Election was successfully challenged June 9, 1896.	Truman H. Aldrich (R)	June 9, 1896
Georgia 3	Charles F. Crisp (D)	Died October 23, 1896. New member elected December 19, 1896.	Charles R. Crisp (D)	December 19, 1896
New York 19	Frank S. Black (R)	Resigned January 7, 1897.	Vacant until next Congress	
Kentucky 10	Joseph M. Kendall (D)	Election was successfully challenged February 18, 1897.	Nathan T. Hopkins (R)	February 18, 1897

== Committees ==
Lists of committees and their party leaders for members of the House and Senate committees can be found through the Official Congressional Directory at the bottom of this article. The directory after the pages of terms of service lists committees of the Senate, House (Standing with Subcommittees, Select and Special) and Joint and, after that, House/Senate committee assignments. On the committees section of the House and Senate in the Official Congressional Directory, the committee's members on the first row on the left side shows the chairman of the committee and on the right side shows the ranking member of the committee.

=== Senate ===
- Additional Accommodations for the Library of Congress (Select) (Chairman: Daniel W. Voorhees; Ranking Member: Shelby M. Cullom)
- Agriculture and Forestry (Chairman: Redfield Proctor; Ranking Member: James Z. George)
- Appropriations (Chairman: William B. Allison; Ranking Member: Francis M. Cockrell)
- Audit and Control the Contingent Expenses of the Senate (Chairman: John P. Jones; Ranking Member: James K. Jones)
- Canadian Relations (Chairman: Thomas H. Carter; Ranking Member: Edward Murphy Jr.)
- Census (Chairman: William E. Chandler; Ranking Member: David Turpie)
- Civil Service and Retrenchment (Chairman: Jeter C. Pritchard; Ranking Member: John B. Gordon)
- Claims (Chairman: Watson C. Squire; Ranking Member: Samuel Pasco)
- Coast Defenses (Chairman: Watson C. Squire; Ranking Member: John B. Gordon)
- Commerce (Chairman: William P. Frye; Ranking Member: George G. Vest)
- Corporations Organized in the District of Columbia (Chairman: James K. Jones; Ranking Member: Isham G. Harris)
- Distributing Public Revenue Among the States (Select)
- District of Columbia (Chairman: James McMillan; Ranking Member: Isham G. Harris)
- Education and Labor (Chairman: George L. Shoup; Ranking Member: James Z. George)
- Engrossed Bills (Chairman: Francis M. Cockrell; Ranking Member: Lucien Baker)
- Enrolled Bills (Chairman: William J. Sewell; Ranking Member: Donelson Caffery)
- Epidemic Diseases (Chairman: George G. Vest; Ranking Member: Jacob H. Gallinger)
- Establish a University in the United States (Select)
- Examine the Several Branches in the Civil Service (Chairman: James H. Kyle; Ranking Member: George Gray)
- Finance (Chairman: Justin S. Morrill; Ranking Member: Daniel W. Voorhees)
- Fisheries (Chairman: George C. Perkins; Ranking Member: Wilkinson Call)
- Five Civilized Tribes of Indians (Select) (Chairman: George Gray; Ranking Member: Orville H. Platt)
- Foreign Relations (Chairman: John Sherman; Ranking Member: John Tyler Morgan)
- Forest Reservations (Select) (Chairman: William V. Allen)
- Geological Survey (Select) (Chairman: Stephen B. Elkins; Ranking Member: Edward C. Walthall)
- Immigration (Chairman: Henry Cabot Lodge; Ranking Member: David B. Hill)
- Indian Affairs (Chairman: Richard F. Pettigrew; Ranking Member: William V. Allen)
- Indian Depredations (Chairman: John L. Wilson; Ranking Member: William Lindsay)
- International Expositions (Select) (Chairman: John M. Thurston; Ranking Member: George G. Vest)
- Interstate Commerce (Chairman: Shelby M. Cullom; Ranking Member: Arthur P. Gorman)
- Irrigation and Reclamation of Arid Lands (Chairman: Francis E. Warren; Ranking Member: Stephen M. White)
- Judiciary (Chairman: George F. Hoar; Ranking Member: James L. Pugh)
- Library (Chairman: Henry C. Hansbrough; Ranking Member: Daniel W. Voorhees)
- Manufactures (Chairman: George P. Wetmore; Ranking Member: Charles H. Gibson)
- Military Affairs (Chairman: Joseph R. Hawley; Ranking Member: William B. Bate)
- Mines and Mining (Chairman: William M. Stewart; Ranking Member: William B. Bate)
- Mississippi River and its Tributaries (Select) (Chairman: Knute Nelson)
- National Banks (Select) (Chairman: Lee Mantle; Ranking Member: John L. Mitchell)
- Naval Affairs (Chairman: J. Donald Cameron; Ranking Member: Joseph Clay Stiles Blackburn)
- Nicaragua Canal (Select) (Chairman: John Tyler Morgan; Ranking Member: John H. Mitchell)
- Organization, Conduct and Expenditures of the Executive Departments (Chairman: Marion Butler; Ranking Member: James Smith Jr.)
- Pacific Railroads (Chairman: John H. Gear; Ranking Member: Calvin S. Brice)
- Patents (Chairman: Orville H. Platt; Ranking Member: Wilkinson Call)
- Pensions (Chairman: Jacob H. Gallinger; Ranking Member: John M. Palmer)
- Post Office and Post Roads (Chairman: Edward O. Wolcott; Ranking Member: Marion Butler)
- Potomac River Front (Select) (Chairman: James Z. George; Ranking Member: William P. Frye)
- Printing (Chairman: Eugene Hale; Ranking Member: Arthur P. Gorman)
- Private Land Claims (Chairman: Isham G. Harris; Ranking Member: Eugene Hale)
- Privileges and Elections (Chairman: John H. Mitchell; Ranking Member: George Gray)
- Public Buildings and Grounds (Chairman: Matthew S. Quay; Ranking Member: George G. Vest)
- Public Health and National Quarantine (Chairman: George S. Vest)
- Public Lands (Chairman: Fred T. Dubois; Ranking Member: William V. Allen)
- Railroads (Chairman: Clarence D. Clark; Ranking Member: James H. Berry)
- Revision of the Laws (Chairman: Julius C. Burrows; Ranking Member: John W. Daniel)
- Revolutionary Claims (Chairman: James L. Pugh; Ranking Member: J. Donald Cameron)
- Rules (Chairman: Nelson W. Aldrich; Ranking Member: Joseph Clay Stiles Blackburn)
- Tariff Regulation (Select)
- Tennessee Centennial Exposition (Select)
- Territories (Chairman: Cushman K. Davis; Ranking Member: David B. Hill)
- Transportation and Sale of Meat Products (Select) (Chairman: Joseph C.S. Blackburn; Ranking Member: George P. Wetmore)
- Transportation Routes to the Seaboard (Chairman: George W. McBride; Ranking Member: John L. M. Irby)
- Trespassers upon Indian Lands (Select) (Chairman: Lucien Baker; Ranking Member: William N. Roach)
- Whole
- Woman Suffrage (Chairman: Wilkinson Call; Ranking Member: Matthew S. Quay) (Select)

=== House of Representatives ===
- Accounts (Chairman: J. Frank Aldrich; Ranking Member: Melville Bull)
- Agriculture (Chairman: James W. Wadsworth; Ranking Member: Horace G. Snover)
- Alcoholic Liquor Traffic (Chairman: Elijah A. Morse; Ranking Member: Jonathan S. Willis)
- Appropriations (Chairman: Joseph G. Cannon; Ranking Member: Joseph D. Sayers)
- Banking and Currency (Chairman: Joseph H. Walker; Ranking Member: Ebenezer J. Hill)
- Claims (Chairman: Charles N. Brumm; Ranking Member: David G. Colson)
- Coinage, Weights and Measures (Chairman: Charles W. Stone; Ranking Member: Benjamin L. Fairchild)
- Disposition of Executive Papers
- District of Columbia (Chairman: Joseph W. Babcock; Ranking Member: George L. Wellington)
- Education (Chairman: Galusha A. Grow; Ranking Member: David A. De Armond)
- Election of the President, Vice President and Representatives in Congress (Chairman: Newton Martin Curtis; Ranking Member: John B. Corliss)
- Elections No.#1 (Chairman: Charles Daniels; Ranking Member: Romulus Z. Linney)
- Elections No.#2 (Chairman: Henry U. Johnson; Ranking Member: Chester I. Long)
- Elections No.#3 (Chairman: Samuel W. McCall; Ranking Member: James H. Codding)
- Enrolled Bills (Chairman: Alva L. Hager; Ranking Member: Benjamin E. Russell)
- Expenditures in the Agriculture Department (Chairman: Charles W. Gillet; Ranking Member: Uriel S. Hall)
- Expenditures in the Interior Department (Chairman: Charles Curtis; Ranking Member: William Sulzer)
- Expenditures in the Justice Department(Chairman: William R. Ellis; Ranking Member: Henry G. Turner)
- Expenditures in the Navy Department (Chairman: Henry F. Thomas; Ranking Member: Smith S. Turner)
- Expenditures in the Post Office Department (Chairman: Henry H. Bingham; Ranking Member: Henry W. Ogden)
- Expenditures in the State Department (Chairman: Lemuel E. Quigg; Ranking Member: Rufus E. Lester)
- Expenditures in the Treasury Department (Chairman: Charles H. Grosvenor; Ranking Member: J. William Stokes)
- Expenditures in the War Department (Chairman: William W. Grout; Ranking Member: Jeremiah V. Cockrell)
- Expenditures on Public Buildings (Chairman: Thomas Settle; Ranking Member: Oscar W. Underwood)
- Foreign Affairs (Chairman: Robert R. Hitt; Ranking Member: Richmond Pearson)
- Immigration and Naturalization (Chairman: Richard Bartholdt; Ranking Member: Rowland B. Mahany)
- Irrigation of Arid Lands (Chairman: Binger Hermann; Ranking Member: Samuel C. Hyde)
- Indian Affairs (Chairman: James S. Sherman; Ranking Member: George E. White)
- Interstate and Foreign Commerce (Chairman: William P. Hepburn; Ranking Member: John B. Corliss)
- Invalid Pensions (Chairman: John A. Pickler; Ranking Member: William E. Andrews)
- Judiciary (Chairman: David B. Henderson; Ranking Member: Foster V. Brown)
- Labor (Chairman: Thomas W. Phillips; Ranking Member: Paul J. Sorg)
- Levees and Improvements of the Mississippi River (Chairman: George W. Ray; Ranking Member: W. Godfrey Hunter)
- Library (Chairman: Alfred C. Harmer; Ranking Member: Amos J. Cummings)
- Manufactures (Chairman: Lewis D. Apsley; Ranking Member: Monroe H. Kulp)
- Merchant Marine and Fisheries (Chairman: Sereno E. Payne; Ranking Member: Edward S. Minor)
- Mileage (Chairman: Ashley B. Wright; Ranking Member: George C. Pendleton)
- Military Affairs (Chairman: John A.T. Hull; Ranking Member: Lucien J. Fenton)
- Militia (Chairman: Benjamin F. Marsh; Ranking Member: Richard W. Parker)
- Mines and Mining (Chairman: David D. Aitken; Ranking Member: Frank M. Eddy)
- Naval Affairs (Chairman: Charles A. Boutelle; Ranking Member: Alston G. Dayton)
- Pacific Railroads (Chairman: H. Henry Powers; Ranking Member: George W. Faris)
- Patents (Chairman: William F. Draper; Ranking Member: Winfield S. Kerr)
- Pensions (Chairman: Henry C. Loudenslager; Ranking Member: Alexander M. Hardy)
- Post Office and Post Roads (Chairman: Eugene F. Loud; Ranking Member: Orrin L. Miller)
- Printing (Chairman: George D. Perkins; Ranking Member: James D. Richardson)
- Private Land Claims (Chairman: George W. Smith; Ranking Member: Benjamin F. Howell)
- Public Buildings and Grounds (Chairman: Seth L. Milliken; Ranking Member: Samuel C. Hyde)
- Public Lands (Chairman: John F. Lacey; Ranking Member: John F. Shafroth)
- Railways and Canals (Chairman: Charles A. Chickering; Ranking Member: Thomas McEwan Jr.)
- Reform in the Civil Service (Chairman: Marriott Brosius; Ranking Member: James McLachlan)
- Revision of Laws (Chairman: William W. Bowers; Ranking Member: Theobald Otjen)
- Rivers and Harbors (Chairman: Warren B. Hooker; Ranking Member: Blackburn B. Dovener)
- Rules (Chairman: Thomas B. Reed; Ranking Member: Charles F. Crisp)
- Standards of Official Conduct
- Territories (Chairman: Joseph A. Scranton; Ranking Member: Philip B. Low)
- Ventilation and Acoustics (Chairman: William S. Linton; Ranking Member: Harry Skinner)
- War Claims (Chairman: Thaddeus M. Mahon; Ranking Member: Samuel Pugh)
- Ways and Means (Chairman: Nelson Dingley; Ranking Member: Charles F. Crisp)
- Whole

=== Joint committees ===
- Alcohol in the Arts (Select)
- Conditions of Indian Tribes (Special)
- Disposition of (Useless) Executive Papers
- Investigate Charities and Reformatory Institutions in the District of Columbia
- The Library
- Printing
- Ford's Theater Disaster

== Caucuses ==
- Democratic (House)
- Democratic (Senate)

== Employees ==
=== Legislative branch agency directors ===
- Architect of the Capitol: Edward Clark
- Librarian of Congress: Ainsworth Rand Spofford
- Public Printer of the United States: Thomas E. Benedict

=== Senate ===
- Chaplain: William H. Millburn (Methodist)
- Secretary: William Ruffin Cox
- Librarian: Alonzo M. Church
- Sergeant at Arms: Richard J. Bright

=== House of Representatives ===
- Chaplain: Edward B. Bagby (Disciples of Christ), until December 2, 1895
  - Henry N. Couden (Universalist), elected December 2, 1895
- Clerk: James Kerr, until December 2, 1895
  - Alexander McDowell, from December 2, 1895
- Clerk at the Speaker's Table: Asher C. Hinds
- Doorkeeper: William J. Glenn, elected December 2, 1895
- Postmaster: Joseph C. McElroy, elected December 2, 1895
- Reading Clerks: E. L. Lampson (D) and R. S. Hatcher (R)
- Sergeant at Arms: Herman W. Snow, until December 2, 1895
  - Benjamin F. Russell, from December 2, 1895

== See also ==
- 1894 United States elections (elections leading to this Congress)
  - 1894–95 United States Senate elections
  - 1894 United States House of Representatives elections
- 1896 United States elections (elections during this Congress, leading to the next Congress)
  - 1896 United States presidential election
  - 1896–97 United States Senate elections
  - 1896 United States House of Representatives elections
