= Charles Frederick Wright =

American politician

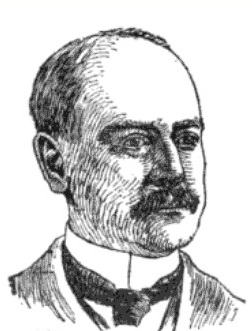
Charles Frederick Wright, Congressman from Pennsylvania

Charles Frederick Wright (May 3, 1856 – November 10, 1925) was a Republican member of the U.S. House of Representatives from Pennsylvania.

Charles F. Wright (brother of Myron Benjamin Wright) was born in Forest Lake Township, Pennsylvania. He graduated from the Montrose Academy in 1874, and worked as a teller for the First National Bank of Montrose, Pennsylvania, 1875–1881. He was an assistant cashier, cashier, and president of the First National Bank of Susquehanna Depot from 1882 to 1899. He was a delegate to the Republican National Conventions in 1896, 1904, and 1908.

Wright was elected as a Republican to the Fifty-sixth, Fifty-seventh, and Fifty-eighth Congresses. He was the chairman of the United States House Committee on Expenditures in the Department of Agriculture during the Fifty-eighth Congress. He was not a candidate for renomination in 1904. He served as the 53rd Pennsylvania Treasurer from 1911 to 1913, and as commissioner of public service in 1915 and 1916.

He resumed he banking pursuits, and died, aged 69, in Susquehanna, Pennsylvania in 1925 and was interred in Evergreen Cemetery.

== Sources ==
- United States Congress. "Charles F. Wright (id: W000756)". Biographical Directory of the United States Congress.
- The Political Graveyard

Political offices
Preceded by John O. Sheatz	Treasurer of Pennsylvania; 1911–1913	Succeeded by Robert K. Young
U.S. House of Representatives
Preceded by James H. Codding	Member of the U.S. House of Representatives from Pennsylvania's 15th congressional district 1899–1903	Succeeded by Elias Deemer
Preceded by Marlin E. Olmsted	Member of the U.S. House of Representatives from Pennsylvania's 14th congressional district 1903–1905	Succeeded by Mial E. Lilley
