= James H. Codding =

American politician

James Hodge Codding
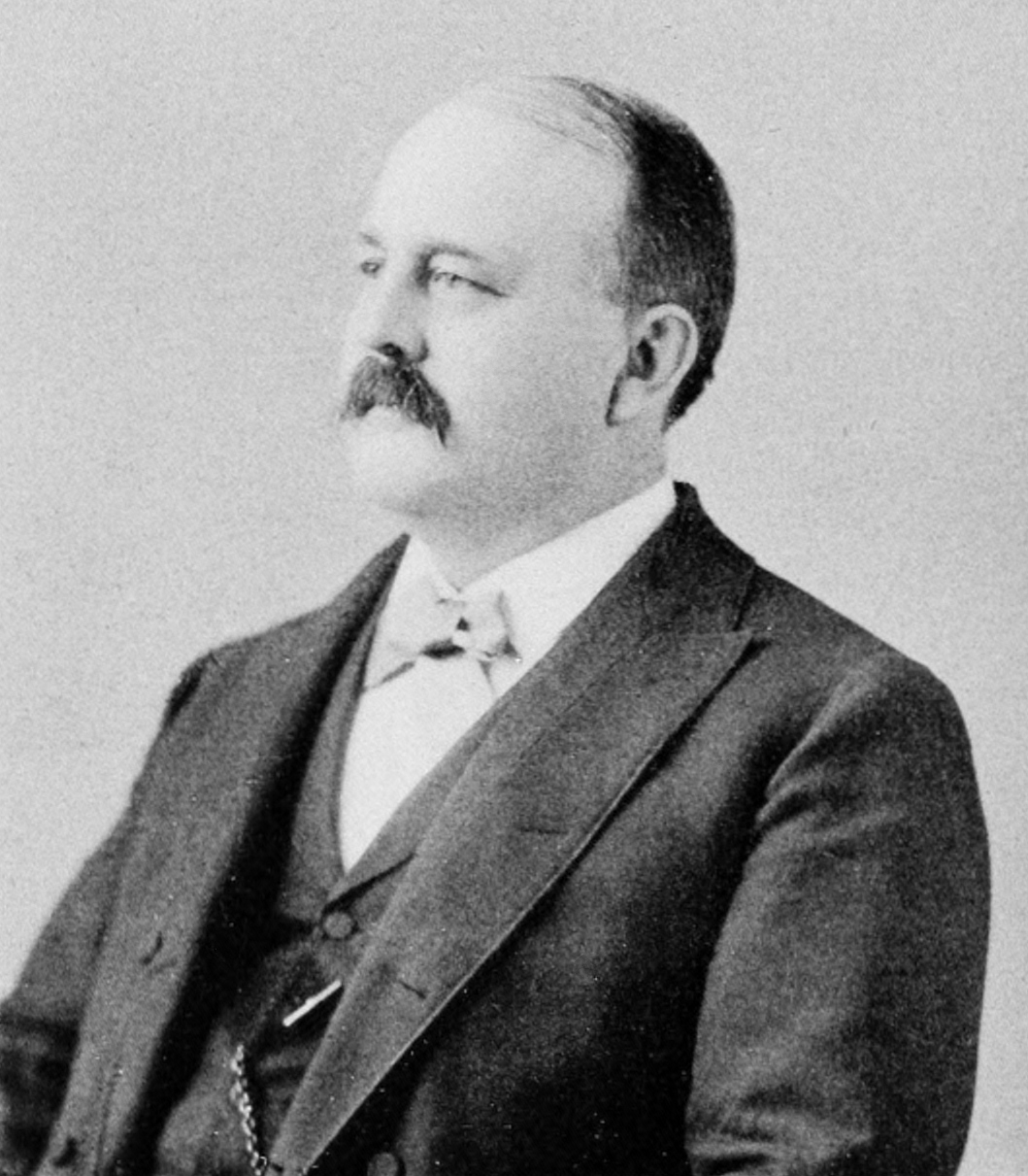

Member of the U.S. House of Representatives from Pennsylvania's 15th district
- In office November 5, 1895 – March 3, 1899
- Preceded by: Edwin J. Jorden
- Succeeded by: Charles F. Wright

Personal details
- Born: July 8, 1849 Pike Township, Pennsylvania
- Died: September 12, 1919 (aged 70)
- Party: Republican

James Hodge Codding (July 8, 1849 – September 12, 1919) was a Republican member of the U.S. House of Representatives from Pennsylvania.

James H. Codding was born in Pike Township, Bradford County, Pennsylvania. He moved to Towanda, Pennsylvania, in 1854. He attended the Susquehanna Collegiate Institute in Towanda and Dartmouth College in Hanover, New Hampshire. He was engaged in the hardware business at Towanda in 1868. He studied law, was admitted to the bar and commenced practice in Towanda in 1879.

Codding was elected as a Republican to the Fifty-fourth Congress to fill the vacancy caused by the death of Myron B. Wright. He was reelected to the Fifty-fifth Congress. He was not a candidate for reelection in 1898. He resumed the practice of law in Towanda, and in 1903 moved to New York City. He served as grand secretary general of the northern Masonic jurisdiction for the Scottish Rite bodies from 1902 until his death in Brooklyn, New York, in 1919. Interment in Oak Hill Cemetery in Towanda, Pennsylvania.

== Sources ==
- United States Congress. "James H. Codding (id: C000580)". Biographical Directory of the United States Congress.
- The Political Graveyard

U.S. House of Representatives
Preceded by Edwin J. Jorden	Member of the U.S. House of Representatives from Pennsylvania's 15th congressional district 1895–1899	Succeeded by Charles F. Wright
