= James J. Walsh (New York politician) =

American politician (1858–1909)

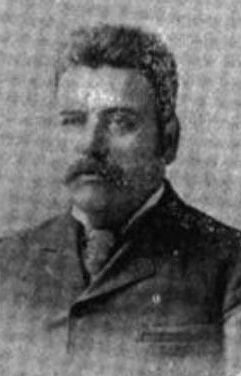
- Walsh c. 1896

Member of the U.S. House of Representatives from New York's 8th district
- In office March 4, 1895 – June 2, 1896
- Preceded by: Edward J. Dunphy
- Succeeded by: John M. Mitchell

Personal details
- Born: May 22, 1858 New York City, U.S.
- Died: May 8, 1909 (aged 50) New York City, U.S.
- Resting place: Calvary Cemetery, Woodside, New York, U.S.
- Party: Democratic
- Spouse: Mary Ellen Lavin (m. 1881)
- Children: 6
- Relatives: Blanche Walsh (cousin)
- Education: Manhattan College (LLB, MA); Columbia Law School (attended)
- Profession: Attorney

James Joseph Walsh (May 22, 1858 – May 8, 1909) was an American attorney and politician from New York City. A Democrat, he served as a member of the United States House of Representatives from New York's 8th congressional district from 1895 to 1896.

== Biography ==
James J. Walsh was born in New York City on May 22, 1858. He attended the public schools and St. James' Parochial School. Walsh graduated from Manhattan College with a Bachelor of Laws degree in 1877 and a Master of Arts degree in 1878. He attended Columbia Law School and read law at the firm of Robinson, Scribner and Monihouse. Walsh was admitted to the bar in 1880 and commenced practice in New York City as the partner of Frank T. Fitzgerald.

Active in politics as a member of the Tammany Hall Democratic organization, Walsh served as an assistant district attorney and Democratic district leader, and was an inspector of New York City's common schools from 1889 to 1894. In 1894, he was a candidate for the United States House of Representatives. He presented credentials as a member-elect to the 54th United States Congress and served from March 4, 1895 until June 2, 1896. He was succeeded by his Republican opponent, John M. Mitchell, who successfully contested the election.

After leaving Congress, Walsh resumed practicing law in New York City. He was appointed a city magistrate in 1905 and served until his death.

Walsh died in New York City on May 8, 1909. He was interred at Calvary Cemetery in Woodside, New York.

== Family ==
Walsh was the son of William Walsh and Mary Agnes (née Martin) Walsh. William Walsh was a New York City politician and public official who served as county clerk.

In 1881, Walsh married Mary Ellen Lavin (1858–1943). They were the parents of six children, four of whom lived to adulthood. Actress Blanche Walsh was Walsh's first cousin; her father Thomas was the brother of Walsh's father.

U.S. House of Representatives
| Preceded by Edward J. Dunphy | Member of the U.S. House of Representatives from New York's 8th congressional district 1895 - 1896 | Succeeded by John M. Mitchell |
