= William H. Kurtz =

American politician

Member of the U.S. House of Representatives from Pennsylvania
- In office March 4, 1851 – March 3, 1855
- Preceded by: Joel B. Danner (15th); James X. McLanahan (16th)
- Succeeded by: James Gamble (15th); Lemuel Todd (16th)
- Constituency: 15th district (1851-53); 16th district (1853-55)

Personal details
- Born: William Henry Kurtz; January 31, 1804 York, Pennsylvania, U.S.
- Died: June 24, 1868 (aged 64) York, Pennsylvania, U.S.
- Resting place: Prospect Hill Cemetery
- Party: Democratic

William Henry Kurtz (January 31, 1804 – June 24, 1868) was a 19th-century American lawyer and politician who served two terms as a Democratic member of the U.S. House of Representatives from Pennsylvania from 1851 to 1855.

== Early life ==
William H. Kurtz was born in York, Pennsylvania. He attended the common schools and the York County Academy at York. He studied law, was admitted to the bar on January 7, 1828, and commenced practice in York.

== Career ==
He served as prosecuting attorney of York County, Pennsylvania.

=== Congress ===
Kurtz was elected as a Democrat to the Thirty-second and Thirty-third Congresses. He served as chairman of the United States House Committee on Public Expenditures during the Thirty-third Congress.

He resumed the practice of law after leaving Congress.

== Death and burial ==
Kurtz died in York on June 24, 1868. He was interred in Prospect Hill Cemetery.

== Sources ==
- United States Congress. "William H. Kurtz (id: K000345)". Biographical Directory of the United States Congress.
- The Political Graveyard

U.S. House of Representatives
Preceded by Joel B. Danner	Member of the U.S. House of Representatives from Pennsylvania's 15th congressional district 1851–1853	Succeeded by James Gamble
Preceded by District created	Member of the U.S. House of Representatives from Pennsylvania's 25th congressional district 1853–1855	Succeeded by John Dick
