= John M. Mitchell =

American politician

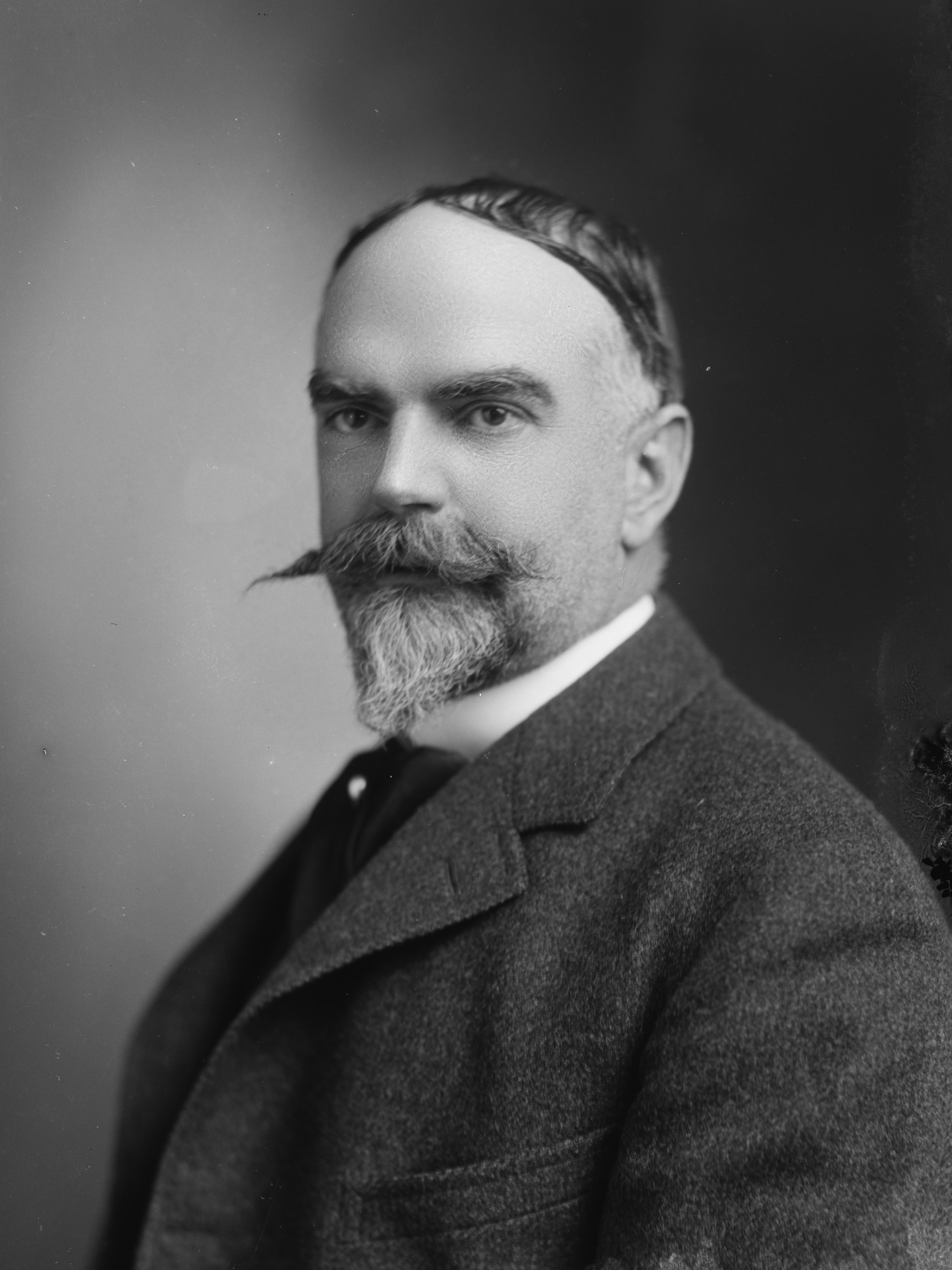
- Portrait by C. M. Bell, c. 1896–1899

Member of the U.S. House of Representatives from New York's 8th district
- In office June 2, 1896 – March 3, 1899
- Preceded by: James J. Walsh
- Succeeded by: Daniel J. Riordan

Personal details
- Born: John Murray Mitchell; March 18, 1858 New York, New York, U.S.
- Died: May 31, 1905 (aged 47) Tuxedo Park, New York, U.S.
- Resting place: Green-Wood Cemetery
- Party: Republican
- Education: Columbia College

John Murray Mitchell (Note: Some databases give his middle name as Murry.) (March 18, 1858 – May 31, 1905) was an American lawyer and politician who served as U.S. Representative from New York.

== Early life ==
J. Murray Mitchell was born in New York City, and attended Leggett's School there. In 1877, he was graduated from Columbia College, New York City, where he was a member of St. Anthony Hall, in 1877. He graduated from the Columbia Law School in 1879.

== Career ==
He was admitted to the bar in 1879 and practiced in New York City.

He successfully contested as a Republican the election of James J. Walsh to the Fifty-fourth Congress. He was reelected to the Fifty-fifth Congress and served from June 2, 1896, to March 3, 1899. He was an unsuccessful candidate for reelection in 1898 to the Fifty-sixth Congress.

He resumed the practice of law.

== Personal ==
He died from cancer at Tuxedo Park, New York, May 31, 1905. He was interred in Brooklyn's Green-Wood Cemetery.

His brother was assemblyman and U.S. Attorney for the Southern District of New York Edward Mitchell.

== Notes ==
U.S. House of Representatives
Preceded by Daniel J. Riordan	Member of the U.S. House of Representatives from New York's 8th congressional district 1896 - 1899	Succeeded by Thomas J. Creamer
