= William H. Fleming =

American politician

William Henry Fleming
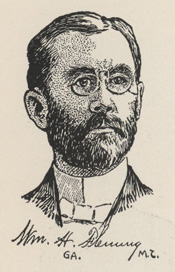

Member of the U.S. House of Representatives 10th District of Georgia
- In office March 4, 1897 – March 3, 1903
- Preceded by: James C. C. Black
- Succeeded by: Thomas W. Hardwick

Speaker of the Georgia House of Representatives
- In office 1894–1895

Member of the Georgia House of Representatives
- In office 1888–1896

Personal details
- Born: October 18, 1856 Augusta, Georgia, U.S.
- Died: June 9, 1944 (aged 87) Augusta, Georgia, U.S.
- Resting place: Summerville Cemetery
- Party: Democratic Party
- Education: University of Georgia
- Profession: attorney

William Henry Fleming (October 18, 1856 – June 9, 1944) was an American politician and lawyer from the U.S. state of Georgia.

== Early years ==
Fleming was born in Augusta, Georgia. He attended Summerville Academy and Academy of Richmond County and the University of Georgia in Athens where he was a member of the Phi Kappa Literary Society. After graduation in 1874, Fleming served as the superintendent of the Augusta and Richmond County, Georgia, public schools from 1877 until his resignation in 1880. He studied law, gained admittance to the state bar in 1880 and began practicing law in Augusta. Fleming, known as "Willie" to close associates, was a friend of Alexander H. Stephens, the 50th governor of Georgia and vice president of the Confederacy. He borrowed $100 from Stephens in 1874. The payoff of this loan is the first piece of correspondence in the a collection maintained by the Atlanta Historical Society. Money borrowing continued to be the topic of many of the letters in the collection.

== Political career ==
From 1888 to 1896, Fleming served in the Georgia House of Representatives and was that body's speaker in 1894 and 1895. He was also the president of the Georgia State Bar Association in 1895. In 1896, Fleming was elected as a Democrat to the United States House of Representatives representing Georgia's 10th congressional district in the 55th United States Congress. He was reelected to two additional terms in that seat (56th and 57th Congresses) before losing his reelection campaign for the 58th Congress in 1902. In total, Fleming's U.S. congressional service took place from March 4, 1897, until March 3, 1903. He returned to practicing law.

Fleming later authored a book entitled Treaty-making Power: Slavery and the Race Problem in the South.

== Death ==
Fleming died in Augusta on June 9, 1944, and was buried in that city's Summerville Cemetery.

== See also ==
- List of speakers of the Georgia House of Representatives

== Works ==
- Speech of the Honorable William H. Fleming from Banquet to honor the Honorable Carl Schurz, Delmonico's restaurant, New York City, March 2, 1899
- Treaty-making Power: Slavery and the Race Problem in the South

== Collections ==
- William Henry Fleming Letters - Atlanta Historical Society
- Fleming, William Henry - Guide to Research Collections - Biographical Directory of the United States Congress

U.S. House of Representatives
| Preceded by James C. C. Black | Member of the U.S. House of Representatives from Georgia's 10th congressional district March 4, 1897 – March 3, 1903 | Succeeded by Thomas W. Hardwick |
