= Finis E. Downing =

American politician

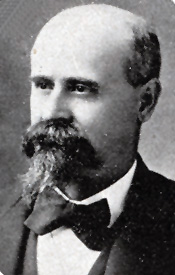

Member of the U.S. House of Representatives from Illinois's 16th district
- In office March 4, 1895 – June 5, 1896
- Preceded by: George W. Fithian
- Succeeded by: John I. Rinaker

Personal details
- Born: August 24, 1846 Virginia, Illinois, U.S.
- Died: March 8, 1936 (aged 89) Virginia, Illinois, U.S.
- Party: Democratic

Finis Ewing Downing (August 24, 1846 – March 8, 1936) was a U.S. Representative from Illinois.

Born in Virginia, Illinois, Downing attended public and private schools. He engaged in mercantile pursuits in Virginia, Illinois, and Butler, Missouri from 1864 to 1880. He served as member of the board of aldermen, Virginia, Illinois from 1876 to 1878. He served as mayor 1878–1880. He served as clerk of the circuit court of Cass County 1880–1892. He studied law. He was admitted to the bar in December 1887 and commenced practice at Virginia, Illinois. He engaged in the newspaper business 1891–1897. Secretary of the State senate in 1892 and 1893. Presented credentials as a Democratic Member-elect to the Fifty-fourth Congress and served from March 4, 1895, to June 5, 1896, when he was succeeded by John I. Rinaker, who contested his election. He was an unsuccessful candidate for renomination in 1896. He was an unsuccessful Democratic candidate for secretary of state of Illinois in 1896. He resumed the practice of law in Virginia, Illinois, and also engaged in the real-estate business. He died in Virginia, Illinois, March 8, 1936. He was interred in Walnut Ridge Cemetery.

Party political offices
Preceded by William H. Hinrichsen	Democratic nominee for Secretary of State of Illinois; 1896	Succeeded by James F. O'Donnell
U.S. House of Representatives
Preceded by George W. Fithian	Member of the U.S. House of Representatives from Illinois's 16th congressional district March 4, 1895 - June 5, 1896	Succeeded by John I. Rinaker
