= 1895 United States House of Representatives election in Utah =

- November 5, 1895

Utah's single seat to the United States House of Representatives
	Majority party	Minority party	Third party
Party	Republican	Democratic	Prohibition
Seats won	1	0	0
Popular vote	20,563	19,666	1,150
Percentage	49.7%	47.5%	2.8%

The United States House of Representatives election in Utah for the 54th Congress was held on November 5, 1895, in anticipation of statehood, which was achieved on January 4, 1896.

== Background ==
Utah Territory had been represented by a delegate since 1851. Utah Territory was originally significantly larger than the current state, including most of Nevada, and portions of Colorado and Wyoming, which borders it held when the first delegate was elected, and was reduced in size in several stages. The territory had been colonized by Mormons who had sought to join the Union as the State of Deseret.

Due in large part to controversies over the beliefs of the Mormon majority, especially in regards to polygamy, the territory's admission as a state was delayed for a long time, and by the time of its admission, it was one of only four remaining territories in the contiguous United States.

== Election results ==
1895 Utah's at-large congressional district election
Party	Candidate	Votes	%
Republican	Clarence E. Allen	20,563	49.7
Democratic	Brigham H. Roberts	19,666	47.5
Prohibition	J. Hogan	1,150	2.8
Total votes		41,379	100.00
Republican win (new seat)			

== See also ==
- 1895 United States House of Representatives elections
