= Joel Buchanan Danner =

American politician

Joel B. Danner
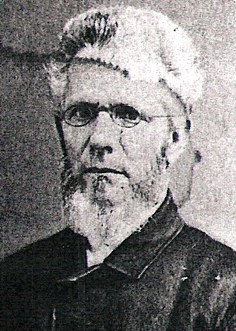

Member of the U.S. House of Representatives from Pennsylvania's 15th district
- In office December 2, 1850 – March 3, 1851
- Preceded by: Henry Nes
- Succeeded by: William H. Kurtz

Personal details
- Born: 1804 Liberty, Maryland
- Died: July 29, 1885 (aged 80–81) Gettysburg, Pennsylvania
- Party: Democratic

Joel Buchanan Danner (1804 – July 29, 1885) was a Democratic member of the U.S. House of Representatives from Pennsylvania.

Joel B. Danner was born in Liberty, Maryland. He engaged in the hardware business and carriage building at Gettysburg, Pennsylvania. He also served as justice of the peace.

Danner was elected as a Democrat to the Thirty-first Congress to fill the vacancy caused by the death of Henry Nes. He resumed his former business pursuits in Gettysburg, where he died in 1885. Interment in Evergreen Cemetery.

== Sources ==
- United States Congress. "Joel Buchanan Danner (id: D000045)". Biographical Directory of the United States Congress.
- The Political Graveyard

U.S. House of Representatives
Preceded by Henry Nes	Member of the U.S. House of Representatives from Pennsylvania's 15th congressional district 1850–1851	Succeeded by William H. Kurtz
