= Henry Nes =

American medical doctor and politician

- In office March 4, 1843 – September 10, 1850
- Succeeded by: Joel Buchanan Danner

Personal details
- Born: May 20, 1799 York, Pennsylvania
- Died: September 10, 1850 (aged 51) York, Pennsylvania
- Party: Independent Democrat (until 1845); Whig (1846–1850)
- Education: Princeton University
- Profession: Physician

Henry Nes (May 20, 1799 – September 10, 1850) was an American medical doctor and politician.

== Biography ==
Nes was born in York, Pennsylvania. The son of William and Elizabeth (Spenger) Nes. He graduated from Princeton College (the New Jersey institution which changed its name to Princeton University in 1896). After his graduation he studied medicine, and then returned to York to practice.

== Political career ==
Nes ran as an Independent Democrat for one of the Pennsylvania seats in the US House of Representatives in the 28th United States Congress (1842). He was successful, and served from 1843 to 1845.

In 1846 Nes ran as a Whig candidate for the same seat in the 30th United States Congress and was elected. In 1848 he ran for re-election, and was again successful.

Nes served in the 31st United States Congress from March until September 1850, when he died in office. A special election was held to fill his seat; the winner was Joel Buchanan Danner.

During his congressional service Nes served as chairman of the United States House Committee on Invalid Pensions and the United States House Committee on Revisal and Unfinished Business, both during the Thirtieth Congress.

== Personal life ==
Nes married Elizabeth Weiser in 1825 and had five children.

== Death ==
Nes died on September 10, 1850. He was buried in York's Prospect Hill Cemetery.

== See also ==
- List of members of the United States Congress who died in office (1790–1899)

== Sources ==
- United States Congress. "Henry Nes (id: N000047)". Biographical Directory of the United States Congress.
- The Political Graveyard

U.S. House of Representatives
Preceded by Benjamin A. Bidlack	Member of the U.S. House of Representatives from Pennsylvania's 15th congressional district 1843–1845	Succeeded by Moses McClean
Preceded by Moses McClean	Member of the U.S. House of Representatives from Pennsylvania's 15th congressional district 1847–1850	Succeeded by Joel B. Danner
