= Edward J. Dunphy =

American politician

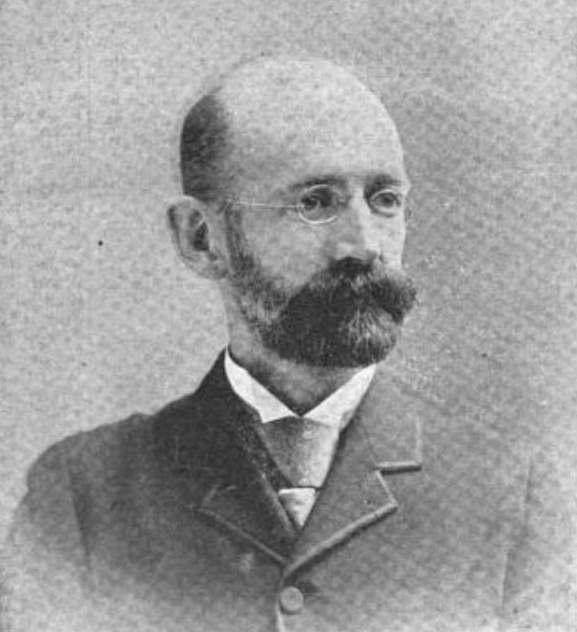

Member of the United States House of Representatives from New York
- In office March 4, 1889 – March 3, 1895
- Preceded by: Lloyd Bryce
- Succeeded by: James J. Walsh
- Constituency: 7th district (1889–93); 8th district (1893–95)

Personal details
- Born: May 12, 1856 New York City, US
- Died: July 29, 1926 (aged 70) New York City, US
- Resting place: Calvary Cemetery, Queens, New York
- Party: Democratic
- Education: Mount St. Mary's College (BA, MA)
- Profession: Attorney

Edward John Dunphy (May 12, 1856 – July 29, 1926) of New York City was a member of the United States House of Representatives from New York from 1889 to 1895. He was a Democrat.

== Biography ==
Edward J. Dunphy was born in New York City on May 12, 1856. He attended the public schools and St. Francis Xavier College, and graduated from Mount St. Mary's College with a Bachelor of Arts degree in 1876 and a Master of Arts in 1878.

He studied law, was admitted to the bar in 1878 and commenced practice in New York City. Dunphy was later employed in the legal department of the New York Central Railroad.

=== Tenure in Congress ===
Dunphy was elected as a Democrat to the Fifty-first, Fifty-second, and Fifty-third Congresses (March 4, 1889 – March 3, 1895). In his final term, he was chairman of the Committee on Expenditures in the Department of Justice. He was not a candidate for reelection in 1894 and resumed the practice of law in New York City.

=== Later career and death ===
In 1891 Dunphy received the honorary degree of LL.D. from Mount St. Mary's.

He died in New York City on July 29, 1926. He was interred at Calvary Cemetery.

U.S. House of Representatives
Preceded by Lloyd Bryce	Member of the U.S. House of Representatives from New York's 7th congressional district 1889 - 1893	Succeeded by Franklin Bartlett
Preceded by Timothy J. Campbell	Member of the U.S. House of Representatives from New York's 8th congressional district 1893 - 1895	Succeeded by James J. Walsh
