= John I. Rinaker =

American politician

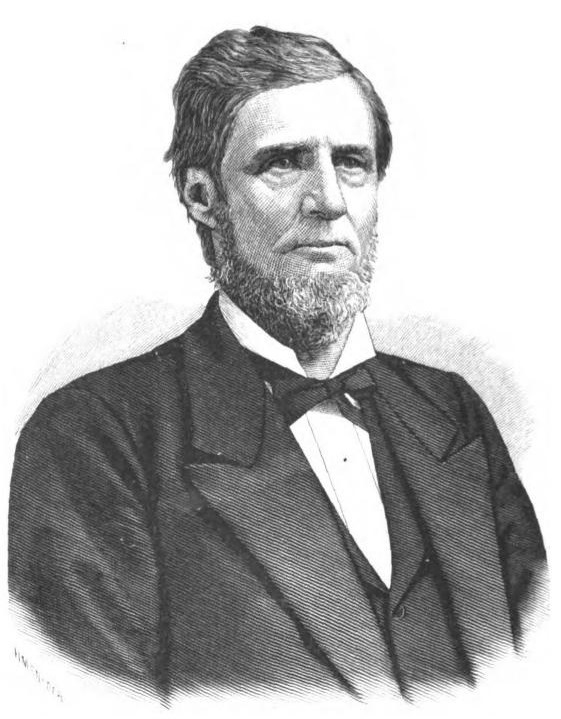
- From Volume I of 1879's History of Macoupin County, Illinois

Member of the U.S. House of Representatives from Illinois's 16th district
- In office June 5, 1896 – March 3, 1897
- Preceded by: Finis E. Downing
- Succeeded by: William H. Hinrichsen

Personal details
- Born: John Irving Rinaker; November 1, 1830 Baltimore, Maryland, U.S.
- Died: January 15, 1915 (aged 84) Eustis, Florida, U.S.
- Party: Republican
- Education: McKendree College
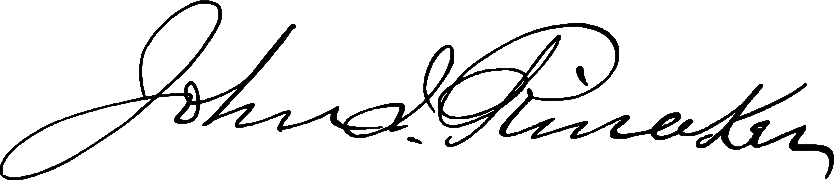
- Signature

Military service
- Allegiance: United States of America; Union
- Branch/service: United States Army; Union Army
- Years of service: 1862–1865
- Rank: Colonel; Brevet Brigadier General
- Commands: 122nd Illinois Infantry Regiment
- Battles/wars: American Civil War

John Irving Rinaker (November 1, 1830 – January 15, 1915) was a U.S. Representative from Illinois and a brigade commander in the Union Army during the American Civil War.

== Biography ==
Born in Baltimore, Maryland, Rinaker moved with his parents to Springfield, Illinois, in December 1836. He attended the Illinois College for one term and graduated from McKendree College, Lebanon, Illinois, in 1851.

He subsequently studied law and was admitted to the bar in 1854 and commenced practice in Carlinville, Illinois.

With the outbreak of the Civil War he raised and organized the 122nd Regiment, Illinois Volunteer Infantry, in 1862 and was commissioned as its first colonel on September 4, 1862. He served in the Western Theater of the American Civil War and commanded a brigade in the XVI Corps of the Army of the Tennessee. In the omnibus promotions at the end of the war, he was brevetted brigadier general dating from March 13, 1865.

Rinaker served as delegate to the Republican National Conventions in 1876 and 1884 and then was chairman of the Board of Railroad and Warehouse Commissioners of Illinois 1885-1889. He successfully contested as a Republican the election of Finis E. Downing to the Fifty-fourth Congress and served from June 5, 1896, to March 3, 1897. He was an unsuccessful candidate for reelection in 1896 to the Fifty-fifth Congress.

Rinaker returned to Carlinville, Illinois, and resumed the practice of law. He died in Eustis, Florida, January 15, 1915. He was interred in the City Cemetery, Carlinville, Illinois.

U.S. House of Representatives
Preceded by Finis E. Downing	Member of the U.S. House of Representatives from Illinois's 16th congressional district June 5, 1896 - March 3, 1897	Succeeded by William H. Hinrichsen
