= Moses McClean =

American politician

Moses McClean (June 17, 1804 – September 30, 1870) was a Democratic member of the U.S. House of Representatives from Pennsylvania.

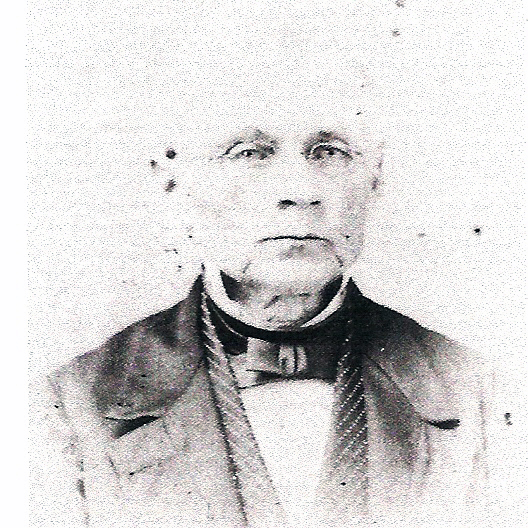
MosesMcClean.

== Biography ==
Born on his father William McLean's farm in Carroll's Tract, near Gettysburg, Pennsylvania, on June 17, 1804, McClean studied law, was admitted to the bar in 1825, and commenced practice in Gettysburg.

McClean was elected as a Democrat to the Twenty-ninth Congress and supported the declaration of war against Mexico during the Mexican–American War. During the Battle of Gettysburg in July 1863, his brick home on Baltimore Street was struck by an errant Union artillery shell, but McClean and his family were unharmed.

After his term expired, he resumed the practice of law in Gettysburg. He returned to politics briefly as a conservative member of the Pennsylvania House of Representatives in 1855, representing the Know Nothing political movement.

== Death ==
He then continued the practice of law until his death in Gettysburg in 1870.

U.S. House of Representatives
Preceded by Henry Nes	Member of the U.S. House of Representatives from Pennsylvania's 15th congressional district 1845–1847	Succeeded by Henry Nes
