= Pennsylvania's 15th congressional district =

U.S. House district for Pennsylvania

Coordinates: 40°31′44″N 75°57′45″W

- Interactive map of district boundaries since January 3, 2023
- Representative: Glenn Thompson; R–Howard Township
- Population (2025): 746,939
- Median household income: $66,632
- Ethnicity: 90.4% White; 3.1% Two or more races; 2.2% Hispanic; 1.9% Asian; 1.9% Black; 0.4% other
- Cook PVI: R+19

Pennsylvania's 15th congressional district has been located in western and central Pennsylvania since 2019. Since 2023, the district includes all of Armstrong, Cameron, Centre, Clarion, Clearfield, Clinton, Elk, Forest, Jefferson, McKean, Potter, Snyder, Tioga, Union, and Warren counties and parts of Indiana, Lycoming, and Venango counties.

From 2013 to 2019, the district stretched from the suburbs east of Harrisburg to communities east of Allentown and the New Jersey border. Counties located in the district included all of Lehigh County and parts of Berks County, Dauphin County, Lebanon County, and Northampton County.

From 2003 to 2013 it comprised all of Northampton County, most of Lehigh County, and small parts of Berks and Montgomery counties. The district included the Lehigh Valley, Indian Valley and Upper Perkiomen Valley regions. In the mid-20th century, it included Tioga County.

In its former boundaries, it had a slight Democratic tilt in registered voters due to the presence of fairly large cities such as Allentown and Bethlehem, with industrial histories. The Democrats in the Lehigh Valley are generally considered more moderate than their counterparts in the Philadelphia area, particularly on social issues. The district has elected Republican candidates for all but six years since 1979. During 1999–2005, Pat Toomey represented the district. From 2005 to 2018, fellow Republican Charlie Dent represented the district; in September 2017 he announced he would be retiring and not seek re-election in 2018. Democrat Susan Wild won the subsequent election.

The Supreme Court of Pennsylvania redrew the district in February 2018 after ruling the previous map unconstitutional because it had gerrymandered too much on behalf of the Republican Party. In 2012 Democrats had won only five of the state's 18 congressional districts, the year the previous redistricting by the legislature took effect, although they won the House statewide popular vote by 1.5 percentage points.

In the redistricting, the old 15th district had its boundaries compressed around Allentown and became the 7th district, while the old 5th district had its boundaries adjusted and became the 15th district for the 2018 election and representation thereafter. It has been represented by Glenn Thompson since January 3, 2019.

== Recent election results from statewide races ==
Year	Office	Results
2008	President	McCain 55–43%
2008	Attorney General	Corbett 65–35%
2008	Auditor General	Wagner 52–48%
2010	Senate	Toomey 63–37%
2010	Governor	Corbett 67–33%
2012	President	Romney 62–38%
2012	Senate	Smith 61–39%
2014	Governor	Corbett 56–44%
2016	President	Trump 66–30%
2016	Senate	Toomey 62–31%
2016	Attorney General	Rafferty Jr. 64–36%
2016	Auditor General	Brown 59–34%
2016	Treasurer	Voit III 57–35%
2018	Senate	Barletta 59–39%
2018	Governor	Wagner 58–40%
2020	President	Trump 68–31%
2020	Attorney General	Heidelbaugh 65–33%
2020	Auditor General	DeFoor 68–28%
2020	Treasurer	Garrity 67–30%
2022	Senate	Oz 64–33%
2022	Governor	Mastriano 60–38%
2024	President	Trump 69–31%
2024	Senate	McCormick 66–31%
2024	Attorney General	Sunday 68–29%
2024	Auditor General	DeFoor 69–28%
2024	Treasurer	Garrity 69–28%

== Counties and municipalities ==
Armstrong County (45)

All 45 municipalities

Cameron County (7)

All 7 municipalities

Centre County (34)

All 34 municipalities

Clarion County (34)

All 34 municipalities

Clearfield County (50)

All 50 municipalities

Clinton County (28)

All 28 municipalities

Elk County (3)

All 3 municipalities

Forest County (9)

All 9 municipalities

Indiana County (34)

Banks Township, Canoe Township, East Mahoning Township, Glen Campbell, Grant Township, Marion Center, Montgomery Township, North Mahoning Township, Smicksburg, South Mahoning Township (part; also 14th), West Mahoning Township

Jefferson County (34)

All 34 municipalities

Lycoming County (32)

Anthony Township, Armstrong Township, Bastress Township, Brady Township, Brown Township, Cascade Township, Cogan House Township, Cummings Township, Duboistown, Gamble Township, Hepburn Township, Lewis Township, Lycoming Township, Jackson Township, Jersey Shore, Limestone Township, McHenry Township, McIntyre Township, McNett Township, Mifflin Township, Nippenose Township, Old Lycoming Township, Piatt Township Pine Townshop, Porter Township, Salladasburg, South Williamsport, Susquehanna Township, Washington Township, Watson Township, Williamsport (part; also 9th) Woodward Township

McKean County (22)

All 22 municipalities

Potter County (30)

All 30 municipalities

Snyder County (21)

All 21 municipalities

Tioga County (34)

All 34 municipalities

Union County (14)

All 14 municipalities

Venango County (19)

Allegheny Township, Cherrytree Township, Clinton Township, Clintonville, Cornplanter Township, Cranberry Township, Emlenton, Oakland Township, Oil City, Oil Creek Township, Pinegrove Township, Pleasantville, Plum Township, President Township, Richland Township, Rockland Township, Rouseville, Scrubgrass Township, Victory Township (part; also 16th)

Warren County (27)

All 27 municipalities

== List of members representing the district ==
Member	Party	Years	Cong ress	Electoral history	Location
District established March 4, 1813
Vacant		March 4, 1813 – May 14, 1813	13th	Representative-elect Abner Lacock was elected in 1812 but resigned February 24, 1813.	1813–1823 [data missing]
Thomas Wilson (Erie)	Democratic-Republican	May 14, 1813 – March 3, 1817	13th 14th	Elected to finish Lacock's term. Re-elected in 1814. Retired.	1813–1823 [data missing]
Robert Moore (Beavertown)	Democratic-Republican	March 4, 1817 – March 3, 1821	15th 16th	Elected in 1816. Re-elected in 1818. Lost re-election.	1813–1823 [data missing]
Patrick Farrelly (Meadville)	Democratic-Republican	March 4, 1821 – March 3, 1823	17th	Elected in 1820. Redistricted to the 18th district.	1813–1823 [data missing]
Thomas Patterson (West Middletown)	Democratic-Republican	March 4, 1823 – March 3, 1825	18th	Redistricted from the 12th district and re-elected in 1822. Retired.	1823–1833 [data missing]
Joseph Lawrence (Washington)	Anti-Jacksonian	March 4, 1825 – March 3, 1829	19th 20th	Elected in 1824. Re-elected in 1826. Lost re-election.	1823–1833 [data missing]
William McCreery (Florence)	Jacksonian	March 4, 1829 – March 3, 1831	21st	Elected in 1828. Lost re-election.	1823–1833 [data missing]
Thomas M. T. McKennan (Washington)	Anti-Masonic	March 4, 1831 – March 3, 1833	22nd	Elected in 1830. Redistricted to the 21st district.	1823–1833 [data missing]
Andrew Beaumont (Wilkes-Barre)	Jacksonian	March 4, 1833 – March 3, 1837	23rd 24th	Elected in 1832. Re-elected in 1834. Retired.	1833–1843 [data missing]
David Petrikin (Danville)	Democratic	March 4, 1837 – March 3, 1841	25th 26th	Elected in 1836. Re-elected in 1838. [data missing]	1833–1843 [data missing]
Benjamin A. Bidlack (Wilkes-Barre)	Democratic	March 4, 1841 – March 3, 1843	27th	Elected in 1840. Redistricted to the 11th district.	1833–1843 [data missing]
Henry Nes (York)	Independent; Democratic	March 4, 1843 – March 3, 1845	28th	Elected in 1843. [data missing]	1843–1853 [data missing]
Moses McClean (Gettysburg)	Democratic	March 4, 1845 – March 3, 1847	29th	Elected in 1844. [data missing]	1843–1853 [data missing]
Henry Nes (York)	Whig	March 4, 1847 – September 10, 1850	30th 31st	Elected in 1846. Re-elected in 1848. Died.	1843–1853 [data missing]
Vacant		September 10, 1850 – December 2, 1850	31st		1843–1853 [data missing]
Joel B. Danner (Gettysburg)	Democratic	December 2, 1850 – March 3, 1851	31st	Elected to finish Nes's term. [data missing]	1843–1853 [data missing]
William H. Kurtz (York)	Democratic	March 4, 1851 – March 3, 1853	32nd	Elected in 1850. Redistricted to the 16th district.	1843–1853 [data missing]
James Gamble (Jersey Shore)	Democratic	March 4, 1853 – March 3, 1855	33rd	Redistricted from the 13th district and re-elected in 1852. [data missing]	1853–1863 [data missing]
John J. Pearce (Williamsport)	Opposition	March 4, 1855 – March 3, 1857	34th	Elected in 1854. Retired.	1853–1863 [data missing]
Allison White (Lock Haven)	Democratic	March 4, 1857 – March 3, 1859	35th	Elected in 1856. Lost re-election.	1853–1863 [data missing]
James T. Hale (Bellefonte)	Republican	March 4, 1859 – March 3, 1863	36th 37th	Elected in 1858. Re-elected in 1860. Redistricted to the 18th district.	1853–1863 [data missing]
Joseph Bailey (Newport)	Democratic	March 4, 1863 – March 3, 1865	38th	Redistricted from the 16th district and re-elected in 1862. [data missing]	1863–1873 [data missing]
Adam J. Glossbrenner (York)	Democratic	March 4, 1865 – March 3, 1869	39th 40th	Elected in 1864. Re-elected in 1866. Lost re-election.	1863–1873 [data missing]
Richard J. Haldeman (Harrisburg)	Democratic	March 4, 1869 – March 3, 1873	41st 42nd	Elected in 1868. Re-elected in 1870. Retired.	1863–1873 [data missing]
John A. Magee (New Bloomfield)	Democratic	March 4, 1873 – March 3, 1875	43rd	Elected in 1872. Lost renomination.	1873–1883 [data missing]
Joseph Powell (Towanda)	Democratic	March 4, 1875 – March 3, 1877	44th	Elected in 1874. Lost re-election.	1873–1883 [data missing]
Edward Overton Jr. (Towanda)	Republican	March 4, 1877 – March 3, 1881	45th 46th	Elected in 1876. Re-elected in 1878. Lost renomination.	1873–1883 [data missing]
Cornelius C. Jadwin (Honesdale)	Republican	March 4, 1881 – March 3, 1883	47th	Elected in 1880. Lost re-election.	1873–1883 [data missing]
George A. Post (Susquehanna)	Democratic	March 4, 1883 – March 3, 1885	48th	Elected in 1882. [data missing]	1883–1903 [data missing]
Frank C. Bunnell (Tunkhannock)	Republican	March 4, 1885 – March 3, 1889	49th 50th	Elected in 1884. Re-elected in 1886. Retired.	1883–1903 [data missing]
Myron B. Wright (Susquehanna)	Republican	March 4, 1889 – November 13, 1894	51st 52nd 53rd	Elected in 1888. Re-elected in 1890. Re-elected in 1892. Re-elected in 1894. Died.	1883–1903 [data missing]
Vacant		November 13, 1894 – February 23, 1895	53rd		1883–1903 [data missing]
Edwin J. Jorden (Coudersport)	Republican	February 23, 1895 – March 3, 1895	53rd	Elected to finish Wright's term. Retired.	1883–1903 [data missing]
Vacant		March 4, 1895 – November 5, 1895	54th		1883–1903 [data missing]
James H. Codding (Towanda)	Republican	November 5, 1895 – March 3, 1899	54th 55th	Elected to finish Wright's term Re-elected in 1896. Retired.	1883–1903 [data missing]
Charles F. Wright (Susquehanna)	Republican	March 4, 1899 – March 3, 1903	56th 57th	Elected in 1898. Re-elected in 1900. Retired.	1883–1903 [data missing]
Elias Deemer (Williamsport)	Republican	March 4, 1903 – March 3, 1907	58th 59th	Redistricted from the 16th district and re-elected in 1902. Re-elected in 1904. Lost re-election.	1903–1923 [data missing]
William B. Wilson (Blossburg)	Democratic	March 4, 1907 – March 3, 1913	60th 61st 62nd	Elected in 1906. Re-elected in 1908. Re-elected in 1910. Lost re-election.	1903–1923 [data missing]
Edgar R. Kiess (Williamsport)	Republican	March 4, 1913 – March 3, 1923	63rd 64th 65th 66th 67th	Elected in 1912. Re-elected in 1914. Re-elected in 1916. Re-elected in 1918. Re-elected in 1920. Redistricted to the 16th district.	1903–1923 [data missing]
Louis T. McFadden (Canton)	Republican	March 4, 1923 – January 3, 1935	68th 69th 70th 71st 72nd 73rd	Redistricted from the 14th district and re-elected in 1922. Re-elected in 1924. Re-elected in 1926. Re-elected in 1928. Re-elected in 1930. Re-elected in 1932. Lost re-election.	1923–1933 [data missing]
Louis T. McFadden (Canton)	Republican	March 4, 1923 – January 3, 1935	68th 69th 70th 71st 72nd 73rd	Redistricted from the 14th district and re-elected in 1922. Re-elected in 1924. Re-elected in 1926. Re-elected in 1928. Re-elected in 1930. Re-elected in 1932. Lost re-election.	1933–1943 [data missing]
Charles E. Dietrich (Tunkhannock)	Democratic	January 3, 1935 – January 3, 1937	74th	Elected in 1934. Lost re-election.	1933–1943 [data missing]
Albert G. Rutherford (Honesdale)	Republican	January 3, 1937 – August 10, 1941	75th 76th 77th	Elected in 1936. Re-elected in 1938. Re-elected in 1940. Died.	1933–1943 [data missing]
Vacant		August 10, 1941 – November 4, 1941	77th		1933–1943 [data missing]
Wilson D. Gillette (Towanda)	Republican	November 4, 1941 – January 3, 1945	77th 78th	Elected to finish Rutherford's term. Re-elected in 1942. Redistricted to the 14th district.	1933–1943 [data missing]
Wilson D. Gillette (Towanda)	Republican	November 4, 1941 – January 3, 1945	77th 78th	Elected to finish Rutherford's term. Re-elected in 1942. Redistricted to the 14th district.	1943–1953 [data missing]
Robert F. Rich (Woolrich)	Republican	January 3, 1945 – January 3, 1951	79th 80th 81st	Elected in 1944. Re-elected in 1946. Re-elected in 1948. Retired.	1943–1953 [data missing]
Alvin Bush (Muncy)	Republican	January 3, 1951 – January 3, 1953	82nd	Elected in 1950. Redistricted to the 17th district.	1943–1953 [data missing]
Francis E. Walter (Easton)	Democratic	January 3, 1953 – May 31, 1963	83rd 84th 85th 86th 87th 88th	Redistricted from the 21st district and re-elected in 1952. Re-elected in 1954. Re-elected in 1956. Re-elected in 1958. Re-elected in 1960. Re-elected in 1962. Died.	1953–1963 [data missing]
Francis E. Walter (Easton)	Democratic	January 3, 1953 – May 31, 1963	83rd 84th 85th 86th 87th 88th	Redistricted from the 21st district and re-elected in 1952. Re-elected in 1954. Re-elected in 1956. Re-elected in 1958. Re-elected in 1960. Re-elected in 1962. Died.	1963–1973 [data missing]
Vacant		May 31, 1963 – July 30, 1963	88th		1963–1973 [data missing]
Fred B. Rooney (Bethlehem)	Democratic	July 30, 1963 – January 3, 1979	88th 89th 90th 91st 92nd 93rd 94th 95th	Elected to finish Walter's term. Re-elected in 1964. Re-elected in 1966. Re-elected in 1968. Re-elected in 1970. Re-elected in 1972. Re-elected in 1974. Re-elected in 1976. Lost re-election.	1963–1973 [data missing]
Fred B. Rooney (Bethlehem)	Democratic	July 30, 1963 – January 3, 1979	88th 89th 90th 91st 92nd 93rd 94th 95th	Elected to finish Walter's term. Re-elected in 1964. Re-elected in 1966. Re-elected in 1968. Re-elected in 1970. Re-elected in 1972. Re-elected in 1974. Re-elected in 1976. Lost re-election.	1973–1983 [data missing]
Donald L. Ritter (Coopersburg)	Republican	January 3, 1979 – January 3, 1993	96th 97th 98th 99th 100th 101st 102nd	Elected in 1978. Re-elected in 1980. Re-elected in 1982. Re-elected in 1984. Re-elected in 1986. Re-elected in 1988. Re-elected in 1990. Lost re-election.	1973–1983 [data missing]
Donald L. Ritter (Coopersburg)	Republican	January 3, 1979 – January 3, 1993	96th 97th 98th 99th 100th 101st 102nd	Elected in 1978. Re-elected in 1980. Re-elected in 1982. Re-elected in 1984. Re-elected in 1986. Re-elected in 1988. Re-elected in 1990. Lost re-election.	1983–1993 [data missing]
Paul F. McHale (Bethlehem)	Democratic	January 3, 1993 – January 3, 1999	103rd 104th 105th	Elected in 1992. Re-elected in 1994. Re-elected in 1996. Retired.	1993–2003 [data missing]
Pat Toomey (Allentown)	Republican	January 3, 1999 – January 3, 2005	106th 107th 108th	Elected in 1998. Re-elected in 2000. Re-elected in 2002. Retired to run for U.S. Senator.	1993–2003 [data missing]
Pat Toomey (Allentown)	Republican	January 3, 1999 – January 3, 2005	106th 107th 108th	Elected in 1998. Re-elected in 2000. Re-elected in 2002. Retired to run for U.S. Senator.	2003–2013
Charlie Dent (Allentown)	Republican	January 3, 2005 – May 12, 2018	109th 110th 111th 112th 113th 114th 115th	Elected in 2004. Re-elected in 2006. Re-elected in 2008. Re-elected in 2010. Re-elected in 2012. Re-elected in 2014. Re-elected in 2016. Resigned.	2003–2013
Charlie Dent (Allentown)	Republican	January 3, 2005 – May 12, 2018	109th 110th 111th 112th 113th 114th 115th	Elected in 2004. Re-elected in 2006. Re-elected in 2008. Re-elected in 2010. Re-elected in 2012. Re-elected in 2014. Re-elected in 2016. Resigned.	2013–2019
Vacant		May 12, 2018 – November 27, 2018	115th		2013–2019
Susan Wild (Allentown)	Democratic	November 27, 2018 – January 3, 2019	115th	Elected to finish Dent's term. Redistricted to the 7th district.	2013–2019
G. T. Thompson (Howard)	Republican	January 3, 2019 – present	116th 117th 118th 119th	Redistricted from the 5th district and re-elected in 2018. Re-elected in 2020. Re-elected in 2022. Re-elected in 2024. Re-elected in 2026.	2019–2023
G. T. Thompson (Howard)	Republican	January 3, 2019 – present	116th 117th 118th 119th	Redistricted from the 5th district and re-elected in 2018. Re-elected in 2020. Re-elected in 2022. Re-elected in 2024. Re-elected in 2026.	2023–

== Recent elections ==
Year	Election	Nominee	Party	Votes	%	Nominee	Party	Votes	%	Nominee	Party	Votes	%
2000	General	Pat Toomey	Republican	118,307	53%	Edward J. O'Brien	Democratic	103,864	47%				
2002	General	Pat Toomey	Republican	98,493	57%	Edward J. O'Brien	Democratic	73,212	43%				
2004	General	Charlie Dent	Republican	170,634	59%	Joe Driscoll	Democratic	141,646	39%				
2006	General	Charlie Dent	Republican	106,153	54%	Charles Dertinger	Democratic	86,186	43%				
2008	General	Charlie Dent	Republican	181,433	59%	Sam Bennett	Democratic	128,333	41%				
2010	General	Charlie Dent	Republican	109,501	54%	John Callahan	Democratic	79,857	39%	Jake Towne	Independent	14,252	8%
2012	General	Charlie Dent	Republican	168,960	57%	Rick Daugherty	Democratic	128,764	43%				
2014	General	Charlie Dent	Republican	128,285	100%								
2016	General	Charlie Dent	Republican	185,204	58%	Rick Daugherty	Democratic	120,190	38%	Paul Rizzo	Libertarian	11,332	4%
2018	Special	Marty Nothstein	Republican	129,594	48.26%	Susan Wild	Democratic	130,353	48.54%				
2018	General	G. T. Thompson	Republican	162,386	67.9%	Susan Boser	Democratic	76,769	32.1%				
2020	General	G. T. Thompson	Republican	255,051	73.46%	Robert Williams	Democratic	92,143	26.54%				
2022	General	G. T. Thompson	Republican	213,417	69.09%	Mike Molesevich	Democratic	91,729	30.01%				

== See also ==
- List of United States congressional districts
- Pennsylvania's congressional districts
