= Edwin J. Jorden =

American politician

Member of the U.S. House of Representatives from Pennsylvania's 15th district
- In office February 23, 1895 – March 3, 1895
- Preceded by: Myron Benjamin Wright
- Succeeded by: James Hodge Codding

Personal details
- Born: August 30, 1863 Spring Hill, Pennsylvania
- Died: September 7, 1903 (aged 40) Tunkhannock, Pennsylvania
- Party: Republican
- Education: State Normal School

Edwin James Jorden (August 30, 1863 – September 7, 1903) was a Republican member of the U.S. House of Representatives from Pennsylvania.

== Biography ==
Edwin J. Jorden was born in Spring Hill, near Towanda, Pennsylvania. He attended the common schools and Keystone Academy. He graduated from the State Normal School at Mansfield, Pennsylvania. He studied law, was admitted to the bar in 1888 and commenced practice in Tunkhannock, Pennsylvania.

Jorden was elected as a Republican to the Fifty-third Congress to fill the vacancy caused by the death of Myron B. Wright and served from February 23 until March 4, 1895 (10 days). He was not a candidate for renomination in 1894. He resumed the practice of his profession and died in Tunkhannock in 1903. Interment in Sunnyside Cemetery.

== Sources ==
- United States Congress. "Edwin J. Jorden (id: J000270)". Biographical Directory of the United States Congress.
- The Political Graveyard

U.S. House of Representatives
Preceded by Myron B. Wright	Member of the U.S. House of Representatives from Pennsylvania's 15th congressional district 1895	Succeeded by James H. Codding
