= Myron B. Wright =

American politician

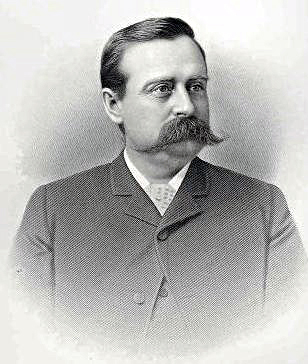
Frontispiece of 1895's "Myron B. Wright, Late a Representative" published by the U.S. Government Printing Office.

Myron Benjamin Wright (June 12, 1847 – November 13, 1894) was a Republican member of the U.S. House of Representatives from Pennsylvania.

Myron B. Wright (brother of Charles Frederick Wright) was born at Forest Lake, Pennsylvania. He attended the common schools and pursued an academic course. He taught school and worked as a clerk in the First National Bank of Susquehanna in 1865 and 1866. He was elected assistant cashier of the bank in 1867 and cashier in 1869. He was interested in several financial, business, and manufacturing enterprises.

Wright was elected as a Republican to the Fifty-first, Fifty-second, and Fifty-third Congresses and served until his death before the close of the Fifty-third Congress. He had been reelected to the Fifty-fourth Congress. He died while on a trip for the benefit of his health in Trenton, Ontario, Canada. Interment in the Grand Street Cemetery in Susquehanna, Pennsylvania.

== See also ==
- List of members of the United States Congress who died in office (1790–1899)

== Sources ==
- United States Congress. "Myron B. Wright (id: W000767)". Biographical Directory of the United States Congress.
- The Political Graveyard

U.S. House of Representatives
Preceded by Frank C. Bunnell	Member of the U.S. House of Representatives from Pennsylvania's 15th congressional district 1889–1894	Succeeded by Edwin J. Jorden
