= James C. C. Black =

Georgia Republican Congressman

James C.C. Black
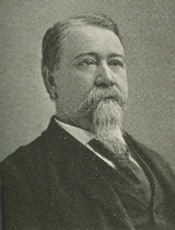

Member of the U.S. House of Representatives from Georgia's 10th district
- In office March 4, 1893 – March 3, 1895
- Preceded by: Thomas E. Watson
- Succeeded by: Vacant
- In office October 2, 1895 – March 3, 1897
- Preceded by: Vacant
- Succeeded by: William H. Fleming

Personal details
- Born: James Conquest Cross Black; May 9, 1842 Stamping Ground, Kentucky, U.S.
- Died: October 1, 1928 (aged 86) Augusta, Georgia, U.S.
- Party: Democratic

James Conquest Cross Black (May 9, 1842 – October 1, 1928) was a nineteenth-century politician and lawyer from Kentucky and Georgia.

== Early life ==
Born in Stamping Ground, Kentucky, Black attended common schools as a child, attended high school in New Castle, Kentucky and graduated from Georgetown College in 1862.

During the Civil War, he enlisted as a private in Company A of the 9th Kentucky Cavalry in the Confederate Army.

After the close of the war, Black moved to Augusta, Georgia in 1865, studied law and was admitted to the bar in 1866, commencing practice in Augusta.

== Career ==
He was a member of the Georgia House of Representatives from 1873 to 1877, served as president of the Augusta Orphan Asylum from 1879 to 1886, was a member of the Augusta city council and was Augusta city attorney.

Black was elected as a Democrat to the United States House of Representatives in 1892, defeating incumbent Populist Tom Watson. Black and Watson faced off again in the election of 1894. Black was declared the winner of the election but Watson charged that the vote was fraudulent. Black agreed to resign his seat just after the opening of the 54th Congress so that a new election could be held. In the October 1895 special election, Black prevailed over Watson again, and thus took his seat back to fill the vacancy caused by his own resignation. He served in the House until 1897, not being a candidate for renomination in 1896. Afterward, he resumed practicing law in Augusta, Georgia until his death.

== Death ==
Black died in Augusta on October 1, 1928. He was interred in Magnolia Cemetery in Augusta.

== Notes ==
U.S. House of Representatives
Preceded by Thomas E. Watson	Member of the U.S. House of Representatives from Georgia's 10th congressional district March 4, 1893 – March 3, 1895	Succeeded by Vacant (James C. C. Black)^{(1)}
Preceded by Vacant (James C. C. Black)^{(1)}	Member of the U.S. House of Representatives from Georgia's 10th congressional district October 2, 1895 – March 3, 1897	Succeeded by William H. Fleming
Notes and references
1. Black succeeded himself to fill a vacancy he caused.
