= Amos J. Cummings =

American politician (1841–1902)

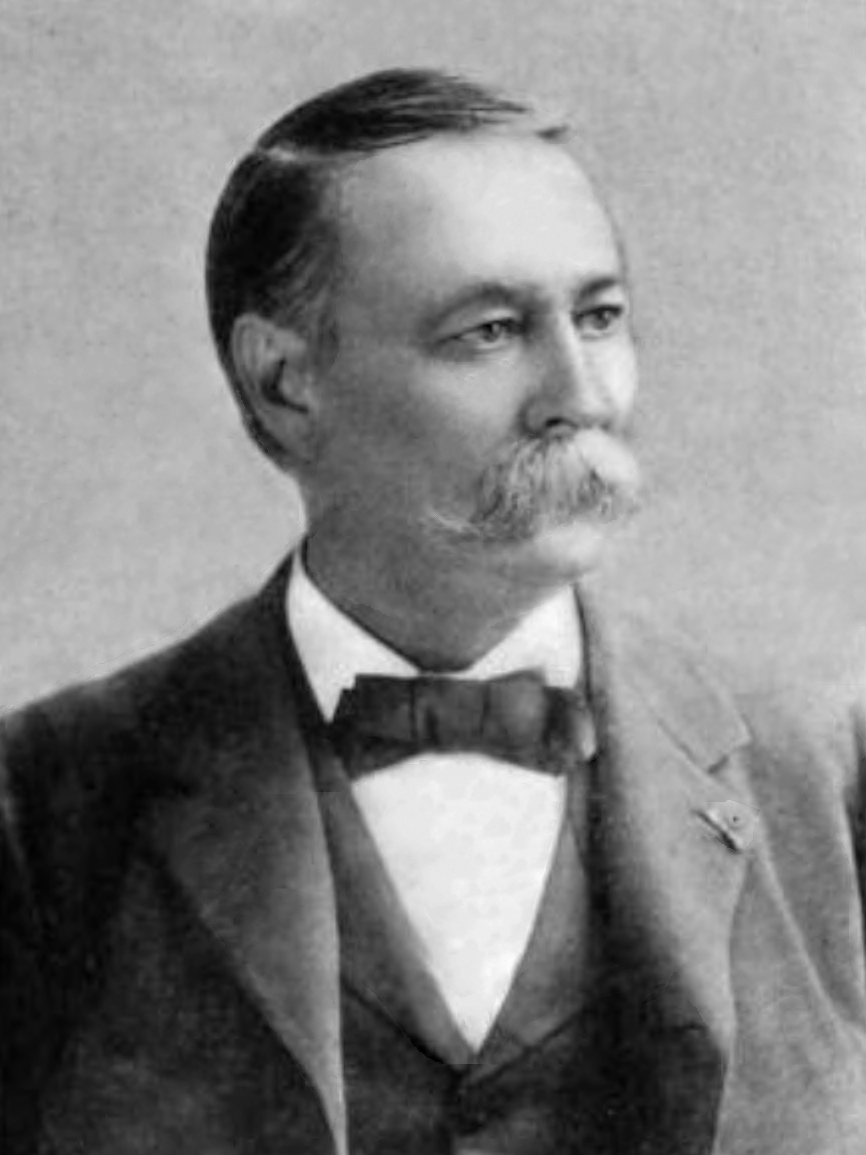

Member of the U.S. House of Representatives from New York
- In office November 5, 1895 – May 2, 1902
- Preceded by: Daniel Sickles
- Succeeded by: Edward Swann
- Constituency: 10th district
- In office November 5, 1889 – November 21, 1894
- Preceded by: Samuel S. Cox
- Succeeded by: William Sulzer
- Constituency: 9th district (1889–93); 11th district (1893–94)
- In office March 4, 1887 – March 3, 1889
- Preceded by: Nicholas Muller
- Succeeded by: Frank T. Fitzgerald
- Constituency: 6th district

Chair of the House Committee on Naval Affairs
- In office 1893–1894

Personal details
- Born: Amos Jay Cummings; May 15, 1841 Conklin, New York
- Died: May 2, 1902 (aged 60) Baltimore, Maryland
- Resting place: Clinton Cemetery in Irvington, New Jersey
- Party: Democratic

Military service
- Allegiance: United States
- Branch/service: Union Army
- Years of service: 1862–1863
- Rank: Sergeant major
- Unit: 26th New Jersey Volunteer Infantry Regiment, Second Brigade, VI Corps
- Battles/wars: American Civil War
- Awards: Medal of Honor

Amos Jay Cummings (May 15, 1841 – May 2, 1902) was an American newspaperman, Civil War veteran, and politician who served as a United States representative from New York from 1889 to 1894, and from 1895 to 1902.

He was a recipient of the United States military's highest decoration, the Medal of Honor.

== Biography ==
Born in Conklin, New York, Cummings attended the common schools before being apprenticed to the printing trade at age twelve.

Cummings claimed he was with William Walker in his last invasion of Nicaragua in October 1858, but this is disputed by Cummings' biographer.

During the Civil War, Cummings enlisted in the army at Irvington, New Jersey, in September 1862 and served as a sergeant major in the 26th New Jersey Volunteer Infantry Regiment. He earned the Medal of Honor on May 4, 1863, at Salem Heights, Virginia. His official citation reads: "Rendered great assistance in the heat of the action in rescuing a part of the field batteries from an extremely dangerous and exposed position." His medal was not awarded until several decades later, on March 28, 1894. He was mustered out in June 1863.

=== Journalism ===
After his military service, Cummings filled editorial positions for the New York Tribune under Horace Greeley. He later worked for The New York Sun and the New York Express. He published a series of popular travel accounts of Florida and the American West for The New York Sun. Cummings was a member of the International Typographical Union No. 6 (New York).

=== Congress ===
Cummings was elected as a Democrat to the 50th Congress (March 4, 1887 – March 3, 1889). He declined renomination in 1888, but was subsequently elected to the 51st Congress to fill the vacancy caused by the death of Samuel S. Cox. He was reelected to the 52nd and 53rd Congresses and served from November 5, 1889, to November 21, 1894, when he resigned. He served as chairman of the Committee on Naval Affairs during the 53rd Congress.

Cummings was elected to the 54th Congress to fill the vacancy caused by the death of Representative-elect Andrew J. Campbell. He was reelected to the 55th, 56th, and 57th Congresses, serving from November 5, 1895, until his death on May 2, 1902.

== Death and burial ==
Cummings died in Baltimore, Maryland of pneumonia on May 2, 1902. He was interred in Clinton Cemetery in Irvington, New Jersey.

== Medal of Honor citation ==
Rank and organization: Sergeant Major, 26th New Jersey Infantry. Place and date: At Salem Heights, Va., 4 May 1863. Entered service at: Irvington, N.J. Born: 15 May 1841, Conklin, N.Y. Date of issue. 28 March 1894.

Citation:

Rendered great assistance in the heat of the action in rescuing a part of the field batteries from an extremely dangerous and exposed position.

== See also ==
- List of American Civil War Medal of Honor recipients: A–F
- List of members of the United States Congress who died in office (1900–1949)

== Notes ==
U.S. House of Representatives
Preceded by Nicholas Muller	Member of the U.S. House of Representatives from New York's 6th congressional district 1887–1889	Succeeded by Frank T. Fitzgerald
Preceded by Samuel S. Cox	Member of the U.S. House of Representatives from New York's 9th congressional district November 5, 1889 – March 3, 1893	Succeeded by Thomas J. Bradley
Preceded by John De Witt Warner	Member of the U.S. House of Representatives from New York's 11th congressional district March 4, 1893 – November 21, 1894	Succeeded by William Sulzer
Preceded by Daniel E. Sickles	Member of the U.S. House of Representatives from New York's 10th congressional district November 5, 1895 – May 2, 1902	Succeeded by Edward Swann
