= Utah's at-large congressional district =

Former congressional district of the United States

- Obsolete district
- Created: 1896
- Eliminated: 1910
- Years active: 1896-1913

From statehood in 1896 through the creation of a second district in 1913, Utah sent one representative to the United States House of Representatives who was elected at-large statewide.

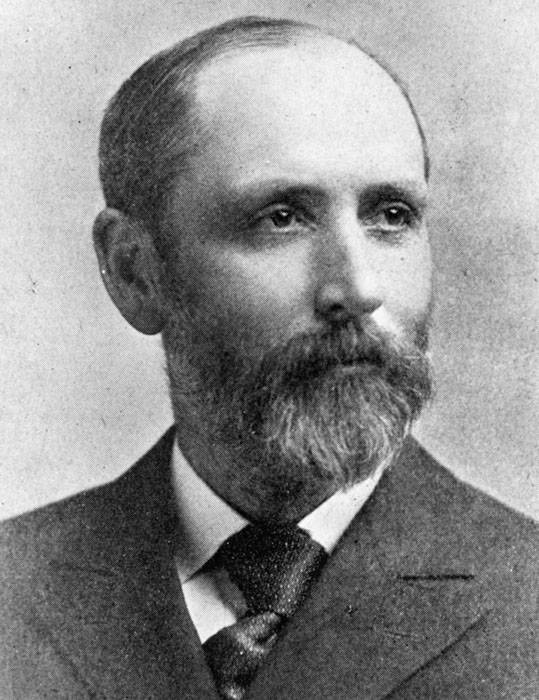
Clarence Emir Allen, first representative from the State of Utah

== List of members representing the district ==
Name	Party	Years	Cong ress	Electoral history
District established January 4, 1896
Clarence Emir Allen (Salt Lake City)	Republican	January 4, 1896 – March 3, 1897	54th	Elected in 1895 and took seat upon statehood. Retired.
William H. King (Salt Lake City)	Democratic	March 4, 1897 – March 3, 1899	55th	Elected in 1896. Lost renomination.
Vacant		March 4, 1899 – April 2, 1900	56th	Representative-elect Brigham Henry Roberts was denied the seat.
William H. King (Salt Lake City)	Democratic	April 2, 1900 – March 3, 1901	56th	Elected to finish Roberts's term. Lost re-election.
George Sutherland (Salt Lake City)	Republican	March 4, 1901 – March 3, 1903	57th	Elected in 1900. Retired to run for U.S. Senator.
Joseph Howell (Logan)	Republican	March 4, 1903 – March 3, 1913	58th 59th 60th 61st 62nd	Elected in 1902. Re-elected in 1904. Re-elected in 1906. Re-elected in 1908. Re-elected in 1910. Redistricted to the 1st district.
District dissolved March 3, 1913
