= Forest Lake Township, Susquehanna County, Pennsylvania =

Township in Pennsylvania, United States

Forest Lake Township, Pennsylvania
- Township
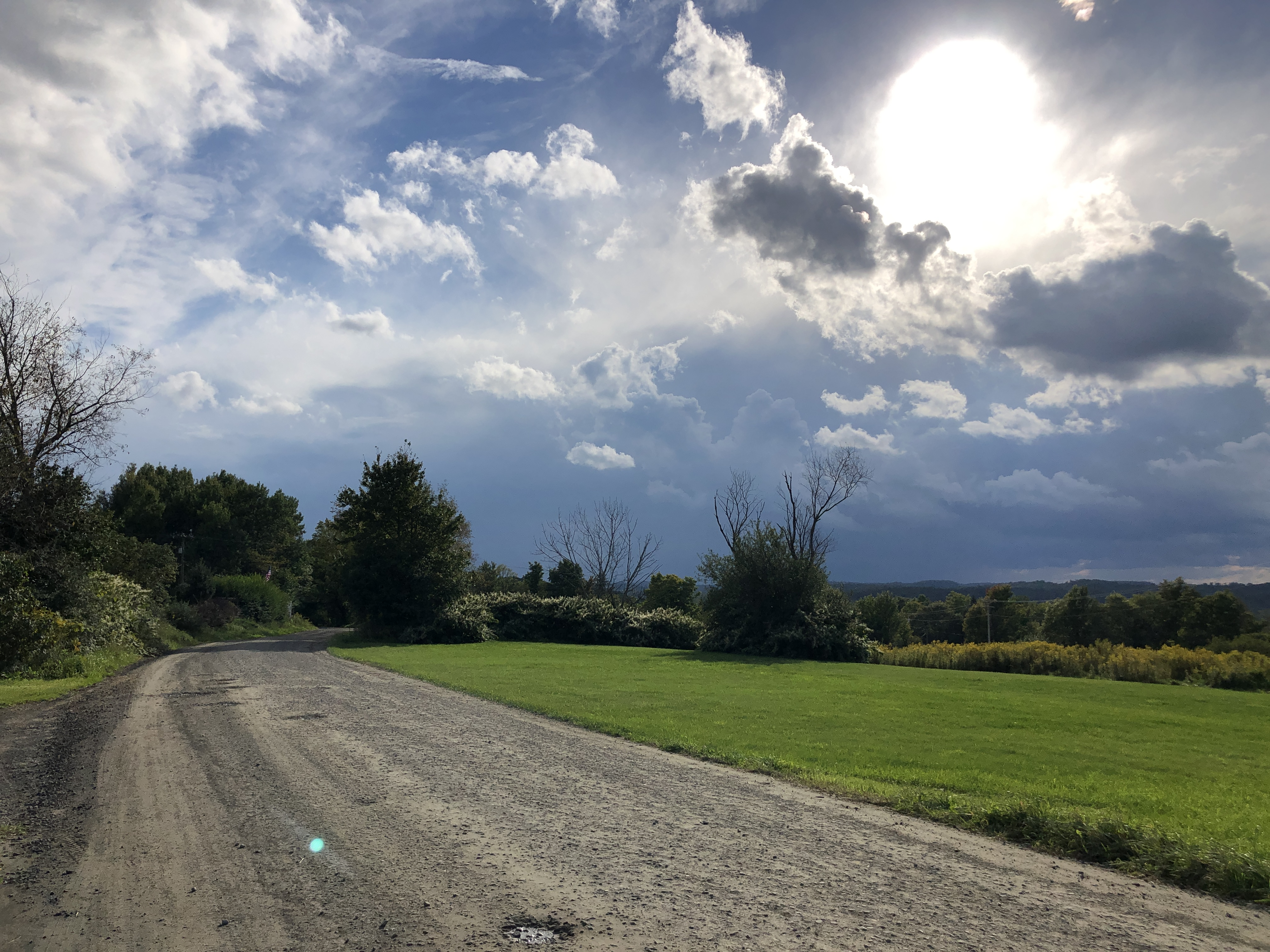
- Scenery along Kane Road in Forest Lake Township

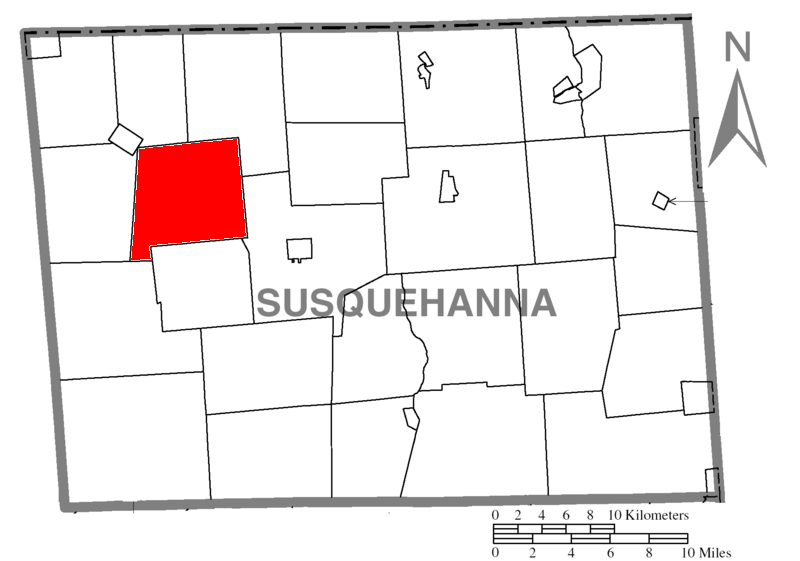

- Location of Pennsylvania in the United States
- Coordinates: 41°52′00″N 76°00′59″W
- Country: United States
- State: Pennsylvania
- County: Susquehanna
- Settled: 1799
- Incorporated: 1836

Area
  - Total: 29.93 sq mi (77.52 km^{2})
  - Land: 29.80 sq mi (77.18 km^{2})
  - Water: 0.13 sq mi (0.33 km^{2})

Population (2020)
  - Total: 1,121 ▼
  - Estimate (2021): 1,117
  - Density: 37.3/sq mi (14.41/km^{2})
- Time zone: UTC-5 (EST)
  - Summer (DST): UTC-4 (EDT)
- Area code: 570
- FIPS code: 42-115-26648
- Website: Forest Lake Township

Forest Lake Township is a township in Susquehanna County, Pennsylvania, United States. The population was 1,121 as of the 2020 census.

== History ==
Forest Lake Township was formed from parts of Bridgewater, Silver Lake, and Middletown Townships on May 4, 1836.

In the 1900s, there was an art camp for girls on the lake itself called Camp Sylvania.

== Geography ==
According to the United States Census Bureau, the township has a total area of 29.93 square miles (77.5 km^{2}), of which 29.8 square miles (77 km^{2}) is land and 0.13 square miles (0.34 km^{2}) (0.43%) is water.

== Demographics ==
Historical population
Census	Pop.	Note	%±
2010	1,193		—
2020	1,121		−6.0%
2021 (est.)	1,117		−0.4%
U.S. Decennial Census

As of the census of 2010, there were 1,193 people, 474 households, and 355 families residing in the township. The population density was 40 people per square mile (15 people/km^{2}). There were 634 housing units at an average density of 21.3 per square mile (8.2/km^{2}). The racial makeup of the township was 98.7% White, 0.3% Asian, 0.2% from other races, and 0.8% from two or more races. Hispanic or Latino of any race were 0.8% of the population.

There were 474 households, out of which 29.5% had children under the age of 18 living with them, 62.7% were married couples living together, 6.3% had a female householder with no husband present, and 25.1% were non-families. 19.2% of all households were made up of individuals, and 8.7% had someone living alone who was 65 years of age or older. The average household size was 2.52 and the average family size was 2.88.

In the township the population was spread out, with 21.1% under the age of 18, 62.3% from 18 to 64, and 16.6% who were 65 years of age or older. The median age was 45 years.

The median income for a household in the township was $47,500, and the median income for a family was $53,846. Males had a median income of $43,167 versus $25,515 for females. The per capita income for the township was $22,251. About 5.4% of families and 6.9% of the population were below the poverty line, including 14.6% of those under age 18 and 4.7% of those age 65 or over.
