= Andrew J. Campbell =

American politician

Andrew Campbell

Member-elect of the U.S. House of Representatives from New York's 10th district
- Died before taking office
- Preceded by: Daniel Sickles
- Succeeded by: Amos J. Cummings

Personal details
- Born: Andrew Jackson Campbell; 1828 Newark, New Jersey, U.S.
- Died: December 6, 1894 (aged 65–66) New York City, New York, U.S.
- Party: Republican

Andrew Jackson Campbell (1828 – December 6, 1894) was an American politician from New York.

== Life ==
Born in Newark, New Jersey, Campbell worked in government as a deputy tax commissioner, clerk of a judicial court and in public works. He was also a merchant in New York City. In 1856, he was elected to the New York City Council. He was a member of the New York State Assembly (New York Co., 9th D.) in 1876.

In 1894, as a Republican, he defeated Democrat Daniel E. Sickles for re-election in New York's 10th congressional district, but died before his term began.

== See also ==
- List of United States representatives-elect who never took their seats

== Sources ==
- THE COUNTY TICKET in NYT on October 30, 1875 [gives sketches of the Republican Assembly nominees in NYC]
- Death of Andrew J. Campbell in NYT on December 7, 1894

New York State Assembly
| Preceded by William H. Gedney | New York State Assembly; New York County, 9th District; 1876 | Succeeded by William H. Corsa |
U.S. House of Representatives
| Preceded by Daniel Sickles | Member-elect of the U.S. House of Representatives from New York's 10th congressional district 1894 | Succeeded by Amos J. Cummings |
