= Schofield (name) =

Schofield is a name.

== People with the surname ==
Notable people with the surname include:

- Admiral Schofield (born 1997), American basketball player
- Alice Schofield (1881–1975), British suffragette and politician
- Andrew Schofield (actor) (born 1958), British actor
- Andrew N. Schofield (1930–2025), British civil engineer and professor of soil mechanics
- Charlie Schofield (born 1993), English professional boxer
- Christopher J. Schofield, English chemist and professor of organic chemistry
- David Schofield (actor) (born 1951), English actor
- David Schofield (footballer) (born 1981), English footballer
- Deborah Schofield, Australian health economist
- Dick Schofield (born 1962), American Major League baseball player
- Don Schofield (1931–1999), Australian rugby league footballer
- Ducky Schofield (1935–2022), American Major League baseball player
- Elizabeth Schofield (1935–2005), British-American archaeologist
- Floyd Schofield Jr. (born 2002), American professional boxer
- Frank Schofield (1889–1970), Canadian veterinarian and philanthropist
- Frank Herman Schofield (1869-1942), U.S. Navy Admiral
- Garry Schofield (born 1965), British rugby league footballer
- George Wheeler Schofield (1833-1882), American Union brevet brigadier general
- Harold Schofield (1903–1975), English footballer
- Harry Methuen Schofield (1899–1955), British test pilot
- Harry Norton Schofield (1865–1931), British recipient of the Victoria Cross
- Jack Lund Schofield (1923–2015), American politician
- Jarrad Schofield (born 1975), Australian Rules football player
- Joe Schofield (1871–1929), English footballer
- John Schofield (VC) (1892–1918), British recipient of the Victoria Cross
- John Schofield (1831–1906), U.S. Secretary of War and Commanding General of the United States Army
- Ken Schofield (born 1946), British golf administrator
- Kinsey Lea Schofield (born 1985), American reality television personality and writer
- Leo Schofield (born 1935), Australian restaurant critic and festival director
- Leslie Schofield (born 1938), English actor
- Norman Schofield (1944–2019), British-American political scientist
- Paul Schofield (screenwriter) (c. 1895–?), American screenwriter
- Peter Schofield (Australian rules footballer) (born 1932), Australian rules footballer
- Peter Schofield (civil servant) (born 1969), British civil servant
- Peter Schofield (physicist) (1929–2018), British physicist
- Phillip Schofield (born 1962), British television presenter
- Rachel Schofield (born 1976), British journalist and news presenter for BBC News
- Sylvia Schofield (1916–2006), British writer and traveller
- Terry Schofield (born 1948), American basketball player and coach
- Walter Elmer Schofield (1867–1944), American landscape and marine painter
- Wilfred Borden Schofield (1927–2008), Canadian botanist

== People with the given name ==
Notable people with the given name include:

- Schofield Haigh (1871–1921), Yorkshire cricketer known for his deadly bowling on sticky wickets

== Fictional characters ==
Fictional characters called Schofield include:

- Shane Schofield, main character in four books by Australian author Matthew Reilly
- Penrod Schofield, main character in three books by American author Booth Tarkington
- Lance Corporal William "Will" Schofield, main character in the 2019 war film 1917.
- Michael Schofield, main character in the television show Prison Break
- Gary "Gaz" Schofield, main character in the 1997 comedy film The Full Monty.

== See also ==
- Scofield (disambiguation)
- Scholefield, a surname
