= Scofield (surname) =

Scofield is a surname of English origin. Notable people with this surname include:

== People ==
- Barbara Scofield (1926–2023), American tennis player
- Bryant T. Scofield (1823–1881), American lawyer and politician from Illinois
- Caleb Scofield (1978–2018), American musician
- Charles A. Scofield (1853–1910), American politician from Connecticut
- Charles L. Scofield (1925–2024), American politician from North Dakota
- Connie Scofield (born 1999), English football player
- Cyrus I. Scofield (1843–1921), American theologian and author of the Scofield Reference Bible
- David H. Scofield (1840–1905), American Civil War soldier
- Dean Scofield (born 1957), American voice actor
- D. G. Scofield (1843–1917), American Standard Oil businessman
- Edward Scofield (1842–1925), American politician from Wisconsin
- Edwin L. Scofield (1852–1918), American politician from Connecticut
- Glenni William Scofield (1817–1891), American politician and judge
- Gregory Scofield (born 1966), Métis Canadian poet
- Hiram Scofield (1830–1906), American Civil War officer in the Union Army
- John Scofield (born 1951), American jazz-rock guitarist and composer
- Paul Scofield (1922–2008), British stage and film actor
- Sandra Scofield, American novelist
- Sandra K. Scofield (born 1947), American politician from Nebraska
- Zoe Scofield, American choreographer and dancer

== Fictional characters ==
- Maureen Scofield, in Close to Home
- Michael Scofield, protagonist of American TV series Prison Break (2005–2009)

== See also ==
- Scofield (disambiguation)
