= Scholfield =

Scholfield is a surname. Notable people with the surname include:

- A.F. Scholfield (1884–1969), Classical scholar and librarian at Cambridge
- Frank Scholfield (1886–1950), English cricketer
- Henry Scholfield (1866–1935), Canadian politician
- John Scholfield (1834–1893), American politician and jurist
- Oliver Scholfield (1993–), Canadian field hockey player
- Thomas Scholfield (1894–1964), Australian politician

== See also ==
- Schofield (disambiguation)
- Scofield (disambiguation)
