= List of former United States representatives (Z) =

This is a complete list of former United States representatives whose last names begin with the letter Z.

== Number of years and terms the member has served ==
The number of years the representative/delegate has served in Congress indicates the number of terms the representative/delegate has. Note the representative/delegate can also serve non-consecutive terms if the representative/delegate loses election and wins re-election to the House.

- 2 years - 1 or 2 terms
- 4 years - 2 or 3 terms
- 6 years - 3 or 4 terms
- 8 years - 4 or 5 terms
- 10 years - 5 or 6 terms
- 12 years - 6 or 7 terms
- 14 years - 7 or 8 terms
- 16 years - 8 or 9 terms
- 18 years - 9 or 10 terms
- 20 years - 10 or 11 terms
- 22 years - 11 or 12 terms
- 24 years - 12 or 13 terms
- 26 years - 13 or 14 terms
- 28 years - 14 or 15 terms
- 30 years - 15 or 16 terms
- 32 years - 16 or 17 terms
- 34 years - 17 or 18 terms
- 36 years - 18 or 19 terms
- 38 years - 19 or 20 terms
- 40 years - 20 or 21 terms
- 42 years - 21 or 22 terms
- 44 years - 22 or 23 terms
- 46 years - 23 or 24 terms
- 48 years - 24 or 25 terms
- 50 years - 25 or 26 terms
- 52 years - 26 or 27 terms
- 54 years - 27 or 28 terms
- 56 years - 28 or 29 terms
- 58 years - 29 or 30 terms

| Name | Term | State/ Territory | Party | Lifespan |
|---|---|---|---|---|
| Clement Zablocki | 1949–1983 | Wisconsin | Democratic | 1912–1983 |
| Leo C. Zeferetti | 1975–1983 | New York | Democratic | 1927–2018 |
| Lee Zeldin | 2015–2023 | New York | Republican | 1980–present |
| Herbert Zelenko | 1955–1963 | New York | Democratic | 1906–1979 |
| Bill Zeliff | 1991–1997 | New Hampshire | Republican | 1936–2021 |
| William T. Zenor | 1897–1907 | Indiana | Democratic | 1846–1916 |
| Edward D. Ziegler | 1899–1901 | Pennsylvania | Democratic | 1844–1931 |
| Frederick Nicholas Zihlman | 1917–1931 | Maryland | Republican | 1879–1935 |
| Dick Zimmer | 1991–1997 | New Jersey | Republican | 1944–2025 |
| Orville Zimmerman | 1935–1948 | Missouri | Democratic | 1880–1948 |
| Roger H. Zion | 1967–1975 | Indiana | Republican | 1921–2019 |
| Marion Zioncheck | 1933–1936 | Washington | Democratic | 1901–1936 |
| Felix Zollicoffer | 1853–1855 | Tennessee | Whig | 1812–1862 |
| Felix Zollicoffer | 1855–1859 | Tennessee | American | 1812–1862 |
| Ed Zschau | 1983–1987 | California | Republican | 1940–present |
| John M. Zwach | 1967–1975 | Minnesota | Republican | 1907–1990 |
