= Peter Schofield =

Peter Schofield may refer to:

- Peter Schofield (Australian rules footballer) (1932–2026), Australian rules footballer who played in the 1950s and 1960s
- Peter Schofield (rugby league) (born 1953), Australian rugby league footballer who played in the 1970s and 1980s
- Peter Schofield (physicist) (1929–2018), British physicist
- Peter Schofield (civil servant) (born 1969), British senior civil servant
