= Ilgenfritz =

Ilgenfritz is a surname. Notable people with the surname include:

- Alice Ilgenfritz (1846–1906), American writer and novelist
- Charles H. Ilgenfritz (1837–1920), American Civil War soldier
- James Ilgenfritz (born 1978), American composer, bassist, and multi-instrumentalist
- Mark Ilgenfritz (born 1952), American football defensive end
- William Ilgenfritz (1946–2026), American Anglican bishop
- Wolfgang Ilgenfritz (1957–2013), Austrian politician
