= Alvin Evans =

American politician

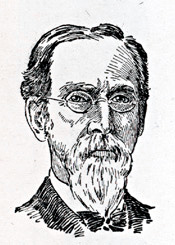
- Alvin Evans

Member of the U.S. House of Representatives from Pennsylvania
- In office March 4, 1901 – March 3, 1905
- Preceded by: Joseph Earlston Thropp
- Succeeded by: John Merriman Reynolds
- Constituency: 20th district (1901–1903); 19th district (1903–1905)

Personal details
- Born: October 4, 1845 Ebensburg, Pennsylvania, U.S.
- Died: June 19, 1906 (aged 60) Ebensburg, Pennsylvania, U.S.
- Party: Republican

Alvin Evans (October 4, 1845 – June 19, 1906) was an American lawyer and Republican member of the U.S. House of Representatives from Pennsylvania.

== Early life and education ==
Born in Ebensburg, Pennsylvania on October 4, 1845, Evans was a son of David J. and Jane Ann (Jones) Evans and a grandson of John Evans, a carpenter and a native of Cardiganshire, Wales. Educated in local public schools and the Iron City Business College in Pittsburgh, Pennsylvania, Alvin Evins obtained a job in lumbering at the age of sixteen when his father's business failed due to the financial crash of 1857.

== Career ==
=== American Civil War ===
In 1862, Alvin Evans enlisted with a volunteer military unit, which was mobilized in response to the potential invasion of Pennsylvania by the Confederate States Army during the American Civil War.

=== Legal and political career ===
After beginning legal studies with George M. Reade of Ebensburg in 1870, he was admitted to the bar in 1873. He then established a law practice in Ebensburg, and later advocated for clients in the Superior Court of Pennsylvania and the Supreme Court of Pennsylvania, as well as in federal court. A one-term burgess for the borough of Ebensburg, he also worked as solicitor for the Pennsylvania Railroad in Cambria County, Pennsylvania, and was a member of the school board and city council of Ebensburg. Involved in the incorporation of the First National Bank of Ebensburg, he was later appointed as president of that bank's board of directors.

Elected as a Republican to the Fifty-seventh and Fifty-eighth Congresses, he did not seek renomination in 1904, but instead returned to the practice of law.

A member of the board of trustees of the First Congregational Church of Ebensburg, he was also active in the Grand Army of the Republic's Captain John M. Jones Post and the Free and Accepted Masons' Summit Lodge, No. 312.

== Personal life ==
He wed Kate Shryock (1846–1886) in Wilmore, Pennsylvania on November 17, 1875. They had three children. Evans died in Ebensburg, and was interred in the Lloyd Cemetery.

U.S. House of Representatives
Preceded by Joseph E. Thropp	Member of the U.S. House of Representatives from Pennsylvania's 20th congressional district 1901–1903	Succeeded by Daniel F. Lafean
Preceded by Robert Jacob Lewis	Member of the U.S. House of Representatives from Pennsylvania's 19th congressional district 1903–1905	Succeeded by John M. Reynolds
