= Schofields =

Schofields can refer to

- Schofields (department store), a defunct department store in Leeds, England
- Schofields, New South Wales, a suburb of Sydney, New South Wales, Australia
  - RAAF Station Schofields, a former Royal Australian Air Force (RAAF) military air base

== See also ==
- Schofield (disambiguation)
