= Frank E. Beltzhoover =

American politician

Frank Eckels Beltzhoover
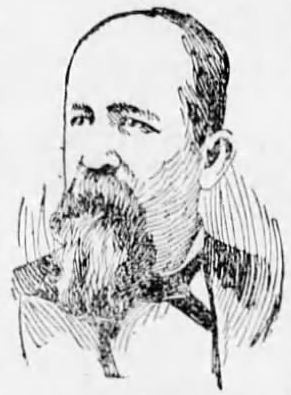

Member of the U.S. House of Representatives from Pennsylvania's 19th district
- In office March 4, 1891 – March 3, 1895
- Preceded by: Levi Maish
- Succeeded by: James A. Stahle
- In office March 4, 1879 – March 3, 1883
- Preceded by: Levi Maish
- Succeeded by: William A. Duncan

Personal details
- Born: November 6, 1841 Silver Spring Township, Pennsylvania
- Died: June 2, 1923 (aged 81) Los Angeles, California
- Party: Democratic

Frank Eckels Beltzhoover (November 6, 1841 – June 2, 1923) was a Democratic member of the U.S. House of Representatives from Pennsylvania.

Frank E. Beltzhoover was born in Silver Spring Township, Pennsylvania. He attended Big Spring Academy in Newville, Pennsylvania. He graduated from Pennsylvania College at Gettysburg in 1862, where he was a member of Phi Kappa Psi fraternity. He studied law, was admitted to the bar in 1864 and commenced practice in Carlisle, Pennsylvania. He served as chairman of the Democratic committee of Cumberland County in 1868 and 1873. He was district attorney from 1874 to 1877. He was a delegate to the 1876 Democratic National Convention.

Beltzhoover was elected as a Democrat to the Forty-sixth and Forty-seventh Congresses. He was not a candidate for renomination in 1882. He was again elected to the Fifty-second and Fifty-third Congresses. He served as chairman of the United States House Committee on War Claims during the Fifty-second and Fifty-third Congresses. He was not a candidate for renomination in 1894.

He resumed the practice of law in Carlisle until 1910, when he moved to Los Angeles, California. He lived in retirement until his death on June 2, 1923. He was interred in Ashland Cemetery in Carlisle, Pennsylvania.

== Sources ==
- United States Congress. "Frank E. Beltzhoover (id: B000355)". Biographical Directory of the United States Congress.
- The Political Graveyard

U.S. House of Representatives
Preceded by Levi Maish	Member of the U.S. House of Representatives from Pennsylvania's 19th congressional district 1879–1883	Succeeded by William A. Duncan
Preceded by Levi Maish	Member of the U.S. House of Representatives from Pennsylvania's 19th congressional district 1891–1895	Succeeded by James A. Stahle
