= William Addison Duncan =

American politician

William A. Duncan
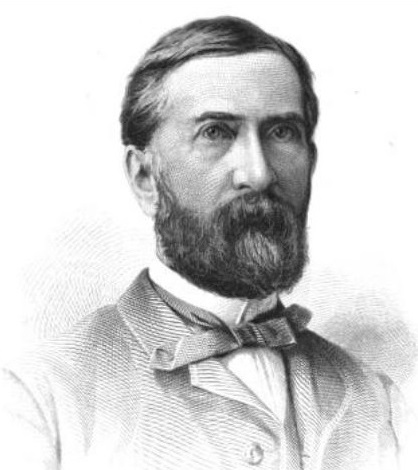
- From 1885's Memorial Addresses on the Life and Character of William A. Duncan, Late a Representative from Pennsylvania

Member of the U.S. House of Representatives from Pennsylvania's 19th district
- In office March 4, 1883 – November 14, 1884
- Preceded by: Frank Eckels Beltzhoover
- Succeeded by: John Augustus Swope

Personal details
- Born: February 2, 1836 Cashtown, Pennsylvania
- Died: November 14, 1884 (aged 48) Gettysburg, Pennsylvania
- Party: Democratic

William Addison Duncan (February 2, 1836 – November 14, 1884) was a Democratic member of the U.S. House of Representatives from Pennsylvania.

== Biography ==
William A. Duncan was born in Cashtown, Pennsylvania. He attended the public schools, and graduated from Franklin & Marshall College in Lancaster, Pennsylvania in 1857. He studied law, was admitted to the bar in 1859 and commenced practice in Gettysburg, Pennsylvania.

Duncan was elected district attorney in 1862 and 1868. He was elected as a Democrat to the Forty-eighth Congress and served until his death in Gettysburg. He had been reelected to the Forty-ninth Congress. Interment in Evergreen Cemetery.

== See also ==
- List of members of the United States Congress who died in office (1790–1899)

== Sources ==
- United States Congress. "William Addison Duncan (id: D000538)". Biographical Directory of the United States Congress.
- The Political Graveyard

U.S. House of Representatives
Preceded by Frank Eckels Beltzhoover	Member of the U.S. House of Representatives from Pennsylvania's 19th congressional district 1883–1884	Succeeded by John Augustus Swope
