= Joseph Henry Kuhns =

American politician (1800–1883)

Joseph H. Kuhns
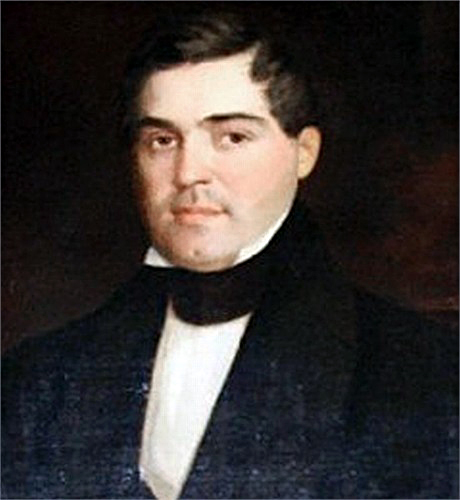
- Joseph Henry Kuhns. Image is in the public domain within the United States.

Member of the U.S. House of Representatives from Pennsylvania's 19th district
- In office March 4, 1851 – March 3, 1853
- Preceded by: Job Mann
- Succeeded by: Augustus Drum

Personal details
- Born: September 1800 Greensburg, Pennsylvania
- Died: November 16, 1883 (aged 83) Greensburg, Pennsylvania
- Party: Whig
- Education: Washington College

Joseph Henry Kuhns (September 1800 – November 16, 1883) was a Whig member of the U.S. House of Representatives from Pennsylvania.

== Biography ==
Joseph H. Kuhns born near Greensburg, Pennsylvania. He graduated from Washington College (later Washington & Jefferson College) in Washington, Pennsylvania, in 1820. He studied law, was admitted to the bar in 1823 and commenced practice in Greensburg.

Kuhns was elected as a Whig to the Thirty-second Congress. He was an unsuccessful candidate for reelection in 1852. He resumed the practice of law in Greensburg and died there in 1883. Interment in St. Clair Cemetery.

== Sources ==
- United States Congress. "Joseph Henry Kuhns (id: K000337)". Biographical Directory of the United States Congress.
- The Political Graveyard

U.S. House of Representatives
Preceded by Job Mann	Member of the U.S. House of Representatives from Pennsylvania's 19th congressional district 1851–1853	Succeeded by Augustus Drum
