= James Thompson (judge) =

American judge

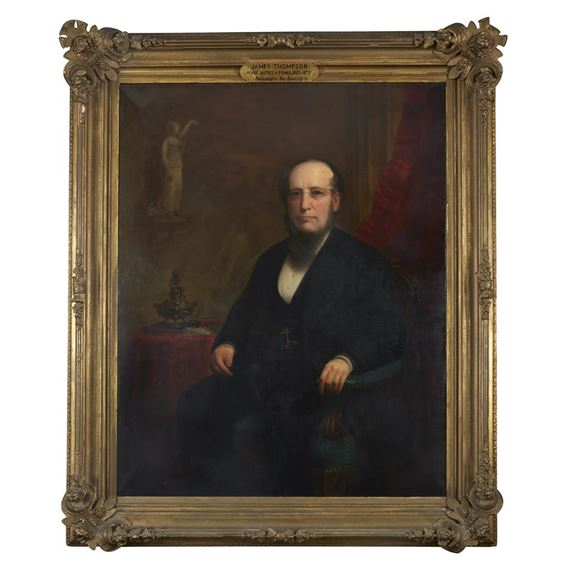

Chief Justice of the Pennsylvania Supreme Court
- In office 1866–1872
- Preceded by: George W. Woodward
- Succeeded by: John M. Read

Associate Justice of the Pennsylvania Supreme Court
- In office 1857–1866
- Preceded by: Walter H. Lowrie
- Succeeded by: George Sharswood

Member of the Pennsylvania House of Representatives
- In office 1855
- Constituency: Erie County
- In office 1832–1835
- Preceded by: John Galbraith
- Constituency: Venango County and Warren County

Chair of the House Democratic Caucus
- In office March 4, 1849 – March 3, 1851
- Speaker: Howell Cobb
- Preceded by: Office established
- Succeeded by: Edson B. Olds

Chair of the House Judiciary Committee
- In office 1849–1851
- Preceded by: Joseph R. Ingersoll
- Succeeded by: James X. McLanahan

Member of the U.S. House of Representatives from Pennsylvania's 23rd district
- In office March 4, 1845 – March 4, 1851
- Preceded by: Charles M. Reed
- Succeeded by: Carlton B. Curtis

Judge of the Sixth Judicial District Court of Pennsylvania
- In office 1838–1844

24th Speaker of the Pennsylvania House of Representatives
- In office 1835–1874
- Preceded by: William Patterson
- Succeeded by: Ner Middleswarth

Personal details
- Born: James Thompson; October 1, 1806 Butler County, Pennsylvania
- Died: January 28, 1874 (aged 67) Philadelphia, Pennsylvania
- Party: Democratic
- Spouse: Mary Parker Snowden
- Children: 6

James Thompson (October 1, 1806 – January 28, 1874) was a lawyer, politician and jurist from Pennsylvania. He served in the United States Congress and in the Pennsylvania House of Representatives, where he was Speaker in 1835. He also served as a federal judge and as a member of the Supreme Court of Pennsylvania.

== Life and career ==
Thompson was born in Middlesex Township, Butler County, Pennsylvania on October 1, 1806. After learning the printing trade, Thompson studied law. He was admitted to the bar in 1829 and practiced as a lawyer in Erie, Pennsylvania.

Thompson served in the Pennsylvania House of Representatives from 1832 to 1834 and in 1855 and served as Speaker in 1834.

He was a delegate to the State constitutional convention in 1838, and the presiding judge of the sixth judicial district court from 1838 until 1844, when he was elected as a Democrat to the United States House of Representatives.

=== Congress ===
Thompson served in the Twenty-ninth, Thirtieth, and Thirty-first Congresses, from March 4, 1845, until March 3, 1851. He was the chairman of the U.S. House Committee on the Judiciary during his second term. In the 31st Congress, Thompson became the first recorded Democratic Caucus Chairman and the first official chairman of any party caucus in either house of Congress.

=== Pennsylvania Supreme Court ===
Thompson did not run for reelection in 1850, but instead returned to practicing law. He became an associate justice of the Supreme Court of Pennsylvania from 1857 to 1866, and served as chief justice of that court from 1866 to 1872.

=== Later career and death ===
He returned to private practice until his death in Philadelphia on January 28, 1874.

Thompson is interred in Woodlands Cemetery.

U.S. House of Representatives
Preceded by Charles M. Reed	Member of the U.S. House of Representatives from Pennsylvania's 23rd congressional district 1845–1851	Succeeded by Carlton B. Curtis
Legal offices
Preceded by George Washington Woodward	Chief Justice of the Pennsylvania Supreme Court; 1867–1872	Succeeded by John Meredith Read
