= 130th Pennsylvania Infantry Regiment =

Union Army infantry regiment

130th Pennsylvania Volunteer Infantry
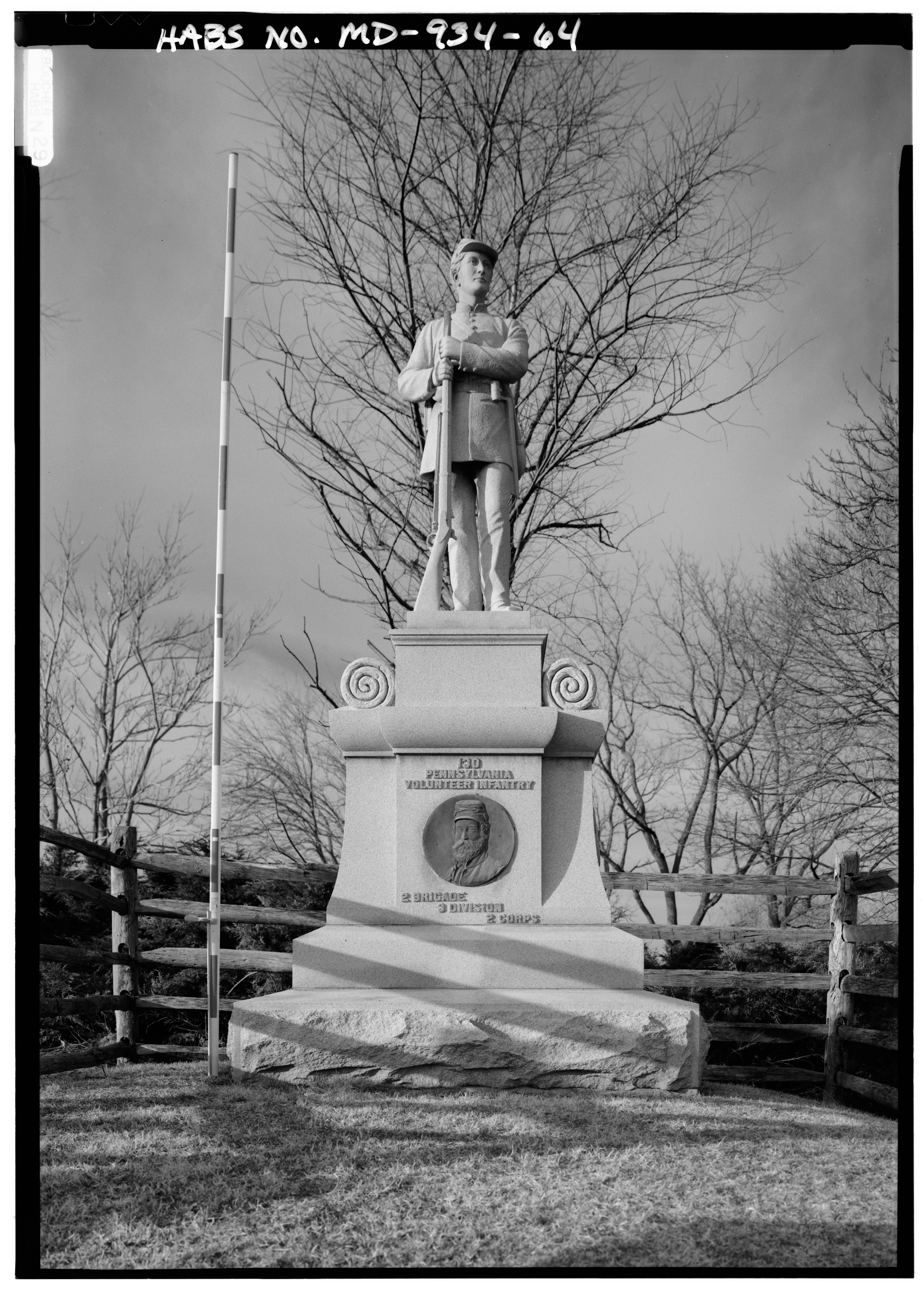
- 130th Pennsylvania Volunteer Infantry Monument at the Antietam National Battlefield
- Active: August 1862 to May 21, 1863
- Country: United States
- Allegiance: Union
- Branch: Infantry
- Engagements: Battle of Antietam; Battle of Fredericksburg; Battle of Chancellorsville

The 130th Pennsylvania Volunteer Infantry was an infantry regiment that served in the Union Army during the American Civil War.

== Service ==
The 130th Pennsylvania Infantry was organized at Harrisburg, Pennsylvania, in August 1862 and mustered in under the command of Colonel Henry I. Zinn.

The regiment was attached to 2nd Brigade, 3rd Division, II Corps, Army of the Potomac.

The 130th Pennsylvania Infantry mustered out May 21, 1863.

== Detailed service ==
Moved to Washington, D.C., August 18, and duty there until September 7. Marched to Rockville, Md., September 7–12. A Maryland Campaign. Battle of Antietam September 16–17. Moved to Harpers Ferry, Va., September 22, and duty there until October 30. Advance up Loudon Valley and movement to Falmouth, Va., October 30-November 19. Battle of Fredericksburg, Va., December 12–15. Duty at Falmouth until April, 1863. Chancellorsville Campaign April 27-May 6. Battle of Chancellorsville May 1–5.

== Casualties ==
The regiment lost a total of 92 men during service; 4 officers and 56 enlisted men killed or mortally wounded, 32 enlisted men died of disease.

== Commanders ==
- Colonel Henry I. Zinn - killed in action at the Battle of Fredericksburg
- Colonel Levi Maish
- Major Joseph S. Jenkins - commanded at the Battle of Chancellorsville after Col. Maish was wounded in action
- Captain William M. Porter - commanded at the Battle of Fredericksburg after the death of Col. Zinn

== See also ==
- List of Pennsylvania Civil War Units
- Pennsylvania in the Civil War
