= Augustus Drum =

American politician

Member of the U.S. House of Representatives from Pennsylvania's 19th district
- In office March 4, 1853 – March 3, 1855
- Preceded by: Joseph Henry Kuhns
- Succeeded by: John Covode

Member of the Pennsylvania House of Representatives
- In office 1852–1853

Personal details
- Born: November 26, 1815 Greensburg, Pennsylvania, U.S.
- Died: September 15, 1858 (aged 42) Greensburg, Pennsylvania, U.S.
- Party: Democratic

Augustus Drum (November 26, 1815 – September 15, 1858) was a Democratic member of the U.S. House of Representatives from Pennsylvania.

== Biography ==
Augustus Drum was born in Greensburg, Pennsylvania. He received private instruction and attended Greensburg Academy. He graduated from Jefferson College (now Washington and Jefferson College) in Canonsburg, Pennsylvania. He studied law, was admitted to the bar in 1836 and commenced practice in Greensburg. He was a member of the Pennsylvania State Senate in 1852 and 1853. He also held several local offices.

Drum was elected as a Democrat to the Thirty-third Congress. He was an unsuccessful candidate for reelection in 1854. He resumed the practice of law in Greensburg and died there in 1858. Interment in St. Clair Cemetery.

U.S. House of Representatives
Preceded by Joseph Henry Kuhns	Member of the U.S. House of Representatives from Pennsylvania's 19th congressional district 1853–1855	Succeeded by John Covode
