= Grandview Cemetery (Johnstown, Pennsylvania) =

Cemetery in Cambria County, Pennsylvania, US

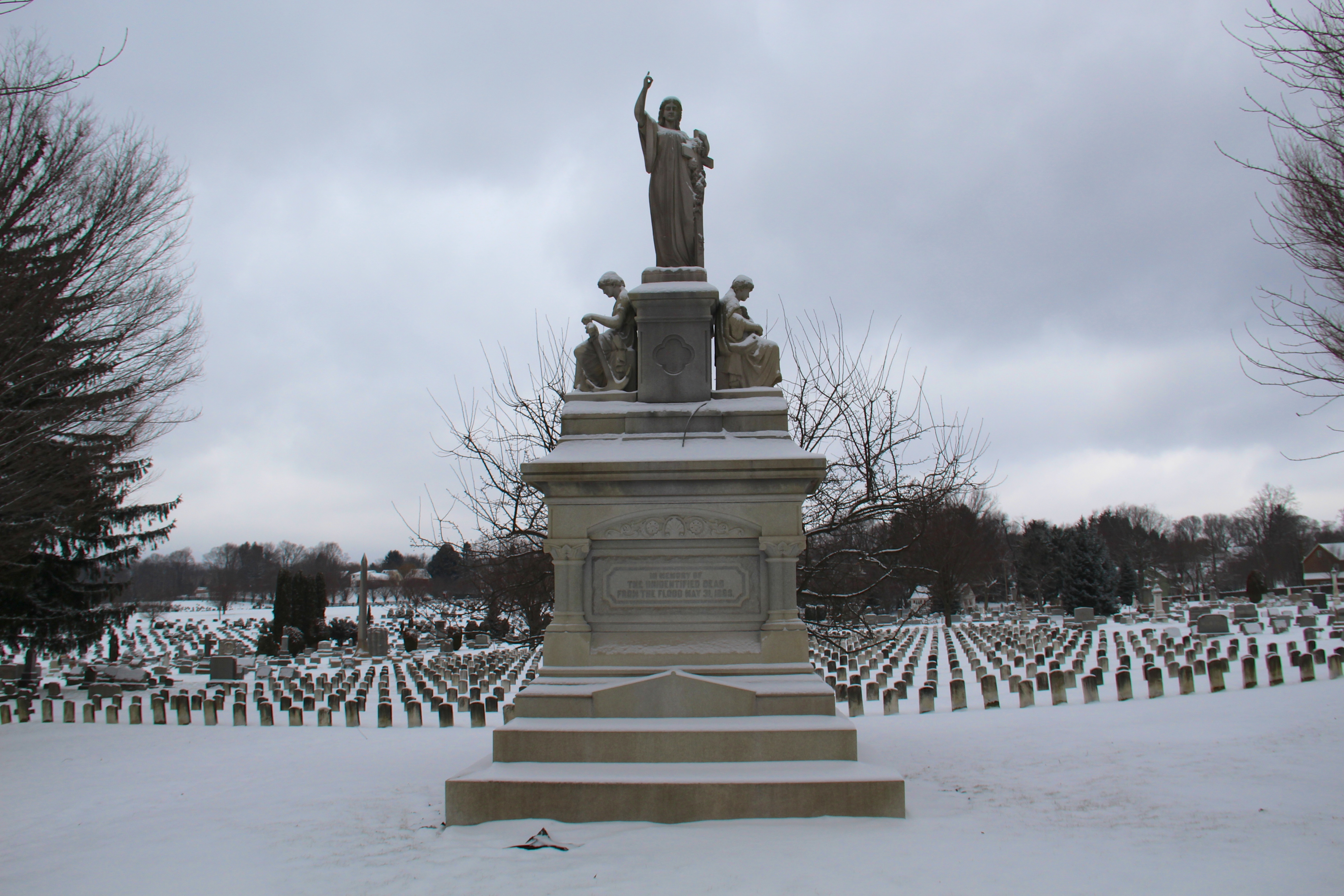
- The Unknown Plot area, containing more than 700 unidentified victims of the 1889 Johnstown Flood
- Interactive map of Grandview Cemetery

Details
- Established: 1885
- Location: 801 Millcreek Road, Johnstown, Pennsylvania
- Coordinates: 40°19′0″N 78°55′35″W
- Size: 235 acres (95 ha)
- No. of graves: Over 70,000
- Find a Grave: Grandview Cemetery
- Grandview Cemetery
- U.S. National Register of Historic Places
- NRHP reference No.: 100011822
- Added to NRHP: May 14, 2025

Grandview Cemetery is a cemetery at 801 Millcreek Road in Johnstown, Pennsylvania, United States. Founded in 1885, the 235-acre (95 ha) cemetery is one of Pennsylvania's largest, with more than 70,000 burials, including those of many victims of the 1889 Johnstown Flood. It was listed on the National Register of Historic Places in 2025.

== History and notable features ==
The cemetery association that operates Grandview was founded in 1885 to accommodate Johnstown's rapidly growing population. The first interment was that of Lucretia Hammond of Kernville (now a part of Johnstown), who was buried on April 30, 1887.

The land for the cemetery, west of the city on Yoder Hill, was purchased from the Cambria Iron Company.

During the late 1880s, Millcreek Road, a steep and winding mile-long street, was built to facilitate public access to the cemetery's original entrance, but in 1904, cemetery overseers found it necessary to create a new entrance to the cemetery at Bucknell Avenue.

The cemetery is best known due to the aftermath of the Johnstown Flood of 1889. Many of the flood's 2,209 victims are buried here. A section of the cemetery called the "Unknown Plot" contains the bodies of 777 flood victims who could not be identified, and a monument to the flood victims was purchased by the state of Pennsylvania and dedicated on May 31, 1892 before an estimated crowd of 10,000 that included the governor of Pennsylvania.

In January 2024, the total number of interments at Grandview was more than 70,000. The cemetery contains forty-seven burial sections and more than 235 acres (0.95 km^{2}), and is one of the largest in Pennsylvania.

== Notable burials ==
- Warren Worth Bailey
- Jacob Miller Campbell
- Elmer Cleveland
- Nat Hickey
- John Graham McCrorey
- Daniel Johnson Morrell
- John Murtha
- George W. Reed
- John Marshall Rose
- John Phillips Saylor
- Howard William Stull
- Boyd Wagner
- Anderson Howell Walters
- George M. Wertz
- John Irving Whalley

== See also ==
- National Register of Historic Places listings in Cambria County, Pennsylvania
