= John M. Rose =

American politician

John Marshall Rose
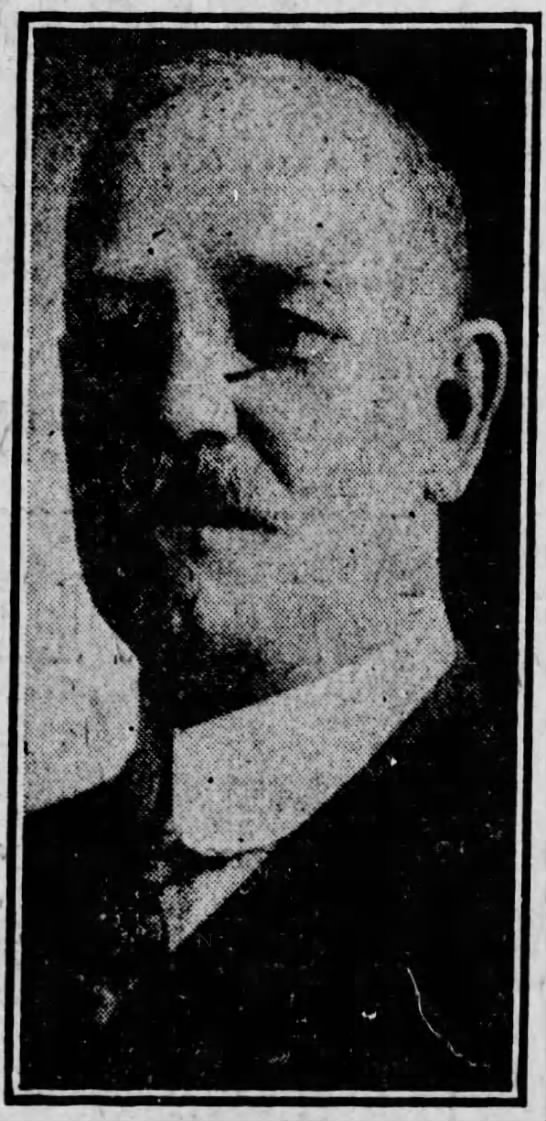

Member of the United States House of Representatives
- In office March 4, 1917 – March 4, 1923
- Constituency: Pennsylvania

Member of the Pennsylvania House of Representatives
- In office 1889–1891

Personal details
- Born: May 18, 1856 Johnstown, Pennsylvania, U.S.
- Died: April 22, 1923 (aged 66) Washington, D.C., U.S.
- Party: Republican
- Education: Washington & Jefferson College
- Occupation: Teacher, politician

John Marshall Rose (May 18, 1856 – April 22, 1923) was a Republican member of the U.S. House of Representatives from Pennsylvania.

== Biography ==
John Marshall Rose was born in Johnstown, Pennsylvania, a son of Wesley J. Rose and Martha Given. He graduated from Washington & Jefferson College in Washington, Pennsylvania, in 1880. He taught school. He studied law, was admitted to the bar in 1884 and commenced practice in Johnstown. He was a member of the Pennsylvania State House of Representatives in 1889, but declined reelection. During his term he acquired the nickname "the whistling statesman" for his habit of whistling popular songs.

Rose was elected as a Republican to the Sixty-fifth, Sixty-sixth, and Sixty-seventh Congresses. He declined to be a candidate for renomination in 1922. He died in Washington, D.C., on April 22, 1923. He is interred in Grandview Cemetery, Johnstown.

U.S. House of Representatives
Preceded by Warren W. Bailey	Member of the U.S. House of Representatives from Pennsylvania's 19th congressional district 1917–1923	Succeeded by Frank C. Sites
