= John Augustus Swope =

American politician

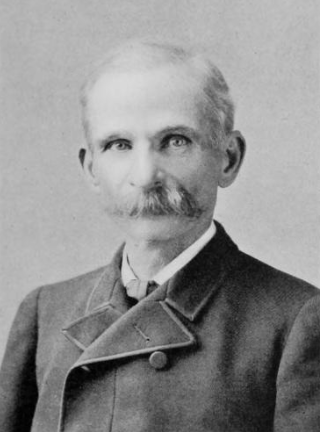
- Born: December 25, 1827; Gettysburg, Pennsylvania, US
- Died: December 6, 1910 (aged 82); Washington, D.C., US
- Resting place: Evergreen Cemetery, Gettysburg, Pennsylvania
- Education: Mount St. Mary Academy; Princeton College (1847); University of Pennsylvania
- Political party: Democratic

John Augustus Swope (December 25, 1827 – December 6, 1910) was a Democratic member of the U.S. House of Representatives from Pennsylvania.

== Biography ==
Born in Gettysburg, Pennsylvania, on December 25, 1827, Swope attended the common schools in Gettysburg and Mount St. Mary's Academy in Emmitsburg, Maryland. A graduate of Princeton College in 1847 and then the medical department of the University of Pennsylvania in Philadelphia, he subsequently entered the practice of medicine, but discontinued that work after a few years and began mercantile work in Baltimore, Maryland.

He then returned to Gettysburg, where he became president of the Gettysburg National Bank in 1879, and subsequently engaged in manufacturing and agricultural pursuits.

Swope was elected in 1884 as a Democrat to the Forty-eighth Congress to fill the vacancy caused by the death of William A. Duncan, serving from December 23, 1884, through March 3, 1885. He was then elected in 1885 to the Forty-ninth Congress to fill the vacancy caused by the death of Mr. Duncan, who had been reelected, and served from November 3, 1885, through March 3, 1887. He was not a candidate for renomination in 1886.

== Later years, death and interment ==
He relocated to Washington, D.C., where he engaged in banking until his death there on December 6, 1910. He was interred in the Evergreen Cemetery in Gettysburg, Pennsylvania.

U.S. House of Representatives
Preceded by William A. Duncan	Member of the U.S. House of Representatives from Pennsylvania's 19th congressional district 1884–1887	Succeeded by Levi Maish
