= Prospect Hill Cemetery (York, Pennsylvania) =

Historic cemetery in York County, Pennsylvania

Coordinates: 39°58′34″N 76°44′08″W

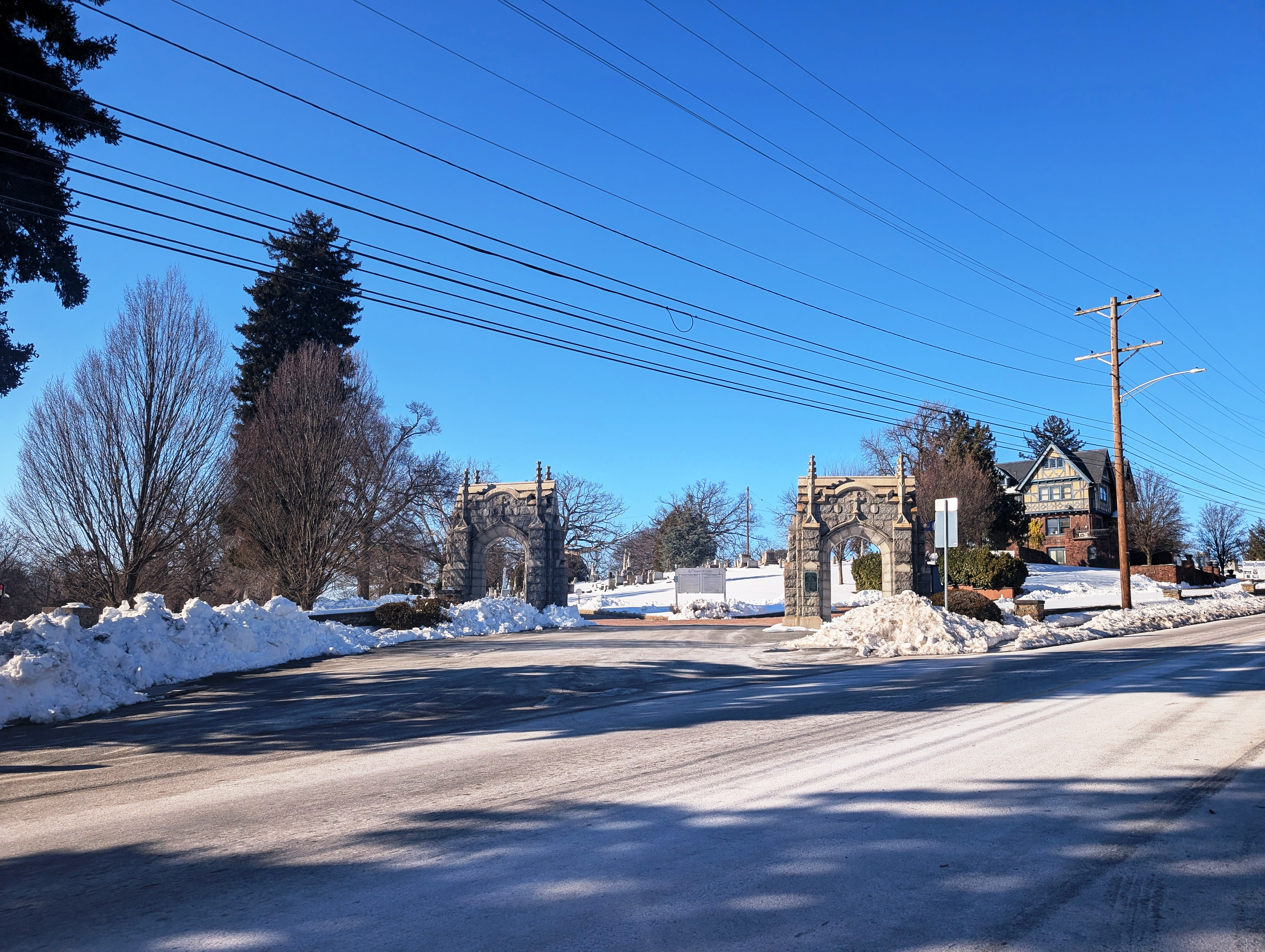
- Entrance gates off North George Street
- Interactive map of Prospect Hill Cemetery

Details
- Established: 1849
- Location: York, Pennsylvania

Prospect Hill Cemetery in York, Pennsylvania is a historic cemetery that was documented by the Historic American Landscapes Survey.

Founded in 1849, is the final resting place for soldiers from every American war. Two Medal of Honor recipients from the Civil War are buried on the premises.

== Notable burials ==
Founding Father

- Philip Livingston (1716–1778) – signer of the Declaration of Independence

Military figures

- J. Henry Denig (1838–1876) – Civil War Medal of Honor recipient
- William B. Franklin (1823–1903) – Union Army General
- Charles H. Ilgenfritz (1837–1920 Civil War Medal of Honor recipient

Politicians

- Jeremiah S. Black (1810–1883) – Presidential Cabinet Secretary
- Edward S. Brooks (1867–1957) – US Congressman
- Samuel Feiser Glatfelter (1858–1927) – US Congressman
- Adam John Glossbrenner (1810–1889) – US Congressman
- Adam King (1783–1835) – US Congressman
- William Henry Kurtz (1804–1868) – US Congressman
- Daniel F. Lafean (1861–1922) – US Congressman
- Henry Nes (1799–1850) – Medical doctor and US Congressman
- Jacob Spangler (1767–1843) – US Congressman
- James Alonzo Stahle (1830–1912) – US Congressman
- S. Walter Stauffer (1888–1975) – US Congressman
- Edward Danner Ziegler (1844–1931) – US Congressman

Others

- Arthur Briggs Farquhar (1838–1925) – Businessman
- George Holtzapple (1862–1946) – Medical pioneer
