= James A. Stahle =

American politician (1829–1912)

James Alonzo Stahle
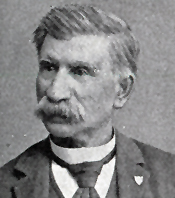
- Portrait of Stahle (c. 1896)

Member of the U.S. House of Representatives from Pennsylvania's 19th district
- In office March 4, 1895 – March 3, 1897
- Preceded by: Frank E. Beltzhoover
- Succeeded by: George J. Benner

Personal details
- Born: January 11, 1829 West Manchester Township, York County, Pennsylvania, U.S.
- Died: December 21, 1912 (aged 83) Emigsville, Pennsylvania, U.S.
- Resting place: Prospect Hill Cemetery; York, Pennsylvania, U.S.
- Party: Republican
- Occupation: Politician; printer; tailor; farmer

James Alonzo Stahle (January 11, 1829 – December 21, 1912) was a Republican member of the U.S. House of Representatives from Pennsylvania.

== Early life ==
Stahle was born in West Manchester Township, York County, Pennsylvania. He attended the common schools and York Academy. He learned the printing trade and later became a merchant tailor.

== Career ==
During the American Civil War, he organized the Ellsworth Zouaves in 1861. In August of that year, he and his company of forty recruits enlisted as Company A of the 87th Pennsylvania Infantry. Stahle rose to the rank of lieutenant colonel. He served until discharged in 1864.

He served as deputy collector of internal revenue at York, Pennsylvania, from 1869 to 1885. He also engaged in agricultural pursuits.

Stahle was elected as a Republican to the Fifty-fourth Congress. He was not a candidate for renomination in 1896. He resumed agricultural pursuits.

== Death ==
Stahle died on his estate at Emigsville near York in 1912. He was interred in Prospect Hill Cemetery in York.

U.S. House of Representatives
Preceded by Frank E. Beltzhoover	Member of the U.S. House of Representatives from Pennsylvania's 19th congressional district 1895–1897	Succeeded by George J. Benner
