= Carlton B. Curtis =

19th century American politician

Carlton Brandaga Curtis
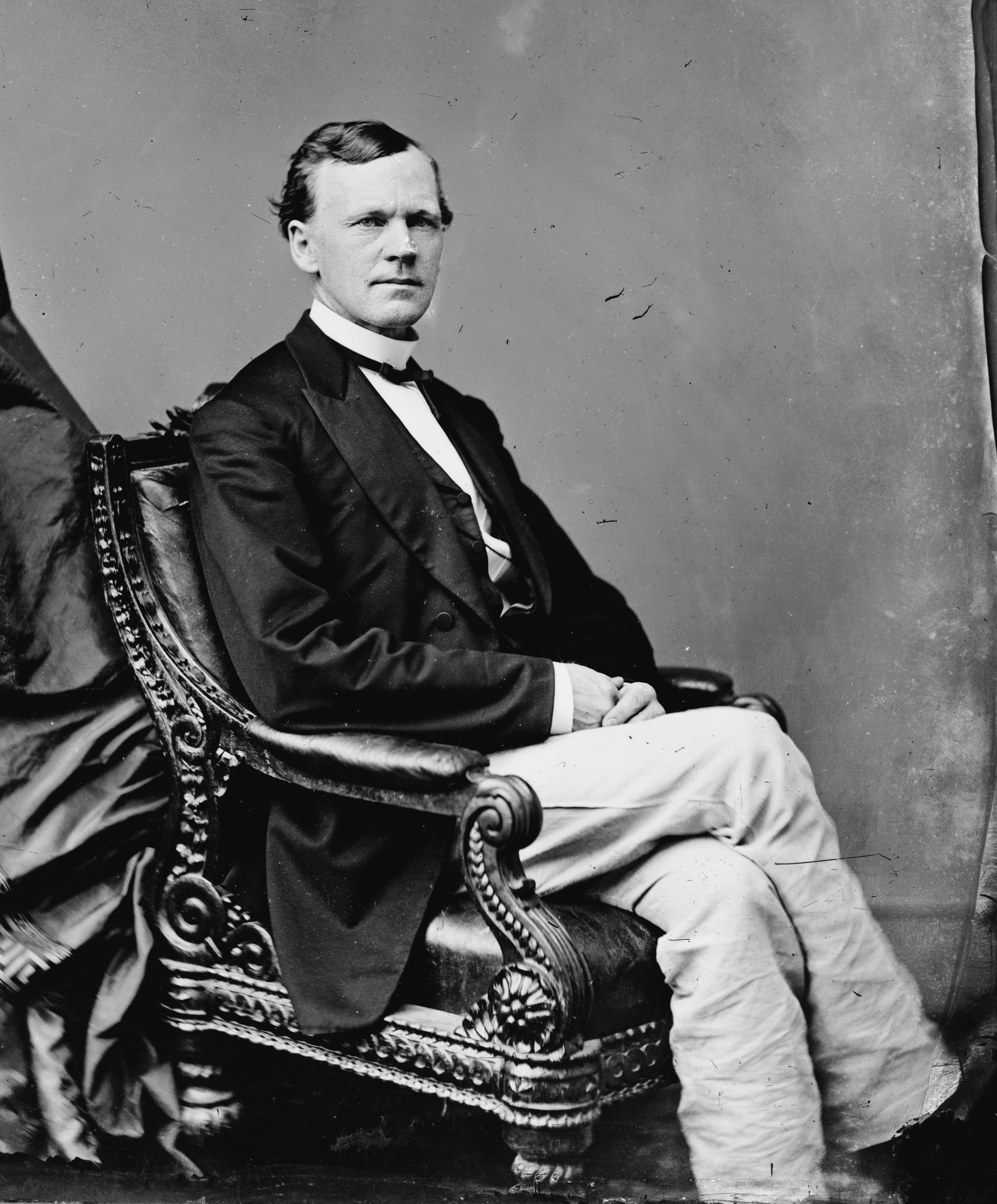

Member of the U.S. House of Representatives from Pennsylvania
- In office March 4, 1851 – March 3, 1855
- Preceded by: James Thompson
- Succeeded by: David Barclay
- Constituency: 23rd district (1851–1853); 24th district (1853–1855)
- In office March 4, 1873 – March 3, 1875
- Preceded by: Glenni W. Scofield
- Succeeded by: Levi Maish
- Constituency: 19th district

Personal details
- Born: December 17, 1811 Madison County, New York, US
- Died: March 17, 1883 (aged 71) Erie, Pennsylvania, US
- Party: Republican (1855–1883); Democratic (until 1855)
- Occupation: Lawyer

Carlton Brandaga Curtis (December 17, 1811 – March 17, 1883) was an American politician from Pennsylvania who served as a Democratic member of the U.S. House of Representatives for Pennsylvania's 23rd congressional district from 1851 to 1859. He then switched parties and later served again as a Republican member for the Pennsylvania's 19th congressional district from 1870 to 1875.

== Early life ==
Curtis was born in Madison County, New York. He moved to Mayville, New York, and studied law. He moved to Erie, Pennsylvania, where he continued the study of law. He was admitted to the bar in 1834. He moved to Warren, Pennsylvania, in 1834 and commenced practice. He was a member of the Pennsylvania State House of Representatives from 1836 to 1838.

== First election to Congress ==
Curtis was elected as a Democrat to the Thirty-second and Thirty-third Congresses. He served as chairman of the United States House Committee on Accounts during the Thirty-third Congress. He was affiliated with the Republican Party in 1855.

== Civil War service ==
Curtis entered the Union Army on February 13, 1862, as lieutenant colonel of the Fifty-eighth Regiment, Pennsylvania Volunteer Infantry for a period of three years. He was promoted to colonel of that regiment on May 23, 1863. Because of illness was honorably discharged as colonel on July 2.

== Post war activities ==
He returned to Warren and practiced law. In 1868, he moved to Erie, Pennsylvania, and continued the practice of law. He was also interested in banking and the production of oil, and was one of the originators and builders of the Dunkirk & Venango Railroad.

Curtis was again elected as a Republican to the Forty-third Congress. He was an unsuccessful candidate for reelection in 1874. He resumed the practice of law, and died in Erie in 1883. He was buried in Oakland Cemetery, Warren, Pennsylvania.

== See also ==
- List of United States representatives from Pennsylvania

U.S. House of Representatives
Preceded by James Thompson	Member of the U.S. House of Representatives from Pennsylvania's 23rd congressional district 1851–1853	Succeeded by Michael C. Trout
Preceded by Alfred Gilmore	Member of the U.S. House of Representatives from Pennsylvania's 24th congressional district 1853–1855	Succeeded by David Barclay
Preceded by Glenni W. Scofield	Member of the U.S. House of Representatives from Pennsylvania's 19th congressional district 1873–1875	Succeeded by Levi Maish
