= Jesse L. Hartman =

American politician

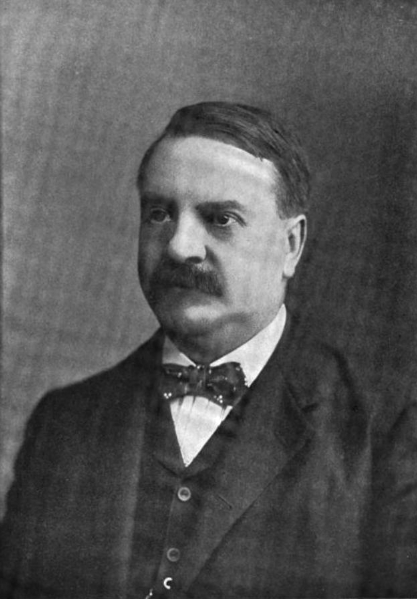

Member of the U.S. House of Representatives from Pennsylvania's 19th district
- In office March 4, 1911 – March 3, 1913
- Preceded by: John Merriman Reynolds
- Succeeded by: Warren Worth Bailey

Personal details
- Born: June 18, 1853 Cottage, Pennsylvania
- Died: February 17, 1930 (aged 76) Hollidaysburg, Pennsylvania
- Party: Republican

Jesse Lee Hartman (June 18, 1853 – February 17, 1930) was a Republican member of the U.S. House of Representatives from Pennsylvania.

== Biography ==
Hartman was born at Cottage, Pennsylvania. He attended public and private schools and the Hollidaysburg Seminary in Hollidaysburg, Pennsylvania. He was employed as a clerk in a general store in Hollidaysburg from 1872 to 1878, and as a manager of a blast furnace at McKees Gap, Pennsylvania, from 1878 to 1891. He returned to Hollidaysburg after being elected prothonotary of Blair County, Pennsylvania, in 1891. He was reelected in 1894 and in 1897. He was extensively engaged in the quarrying and shipping of ganister. He served as president of the Hollidaysburg Trust Co. from 1898 to 1930.

Hartman was elected as a Republican to the Sixty-second Congress. He was unsuccessful as a candidate for reelection in 1912, and for election in 1914. He resumed his former mining and banking pursuits at Hollidaysburg. He was a delegate to the Republican National Conventions in 1908, 1924, and 1928. He died in Hollidaysburg. Interment was in Presbyterian Cemetery.

U.S. House of Representatives
Preceded by John M. Reynolds	Member of the U.S. House of Representatives from Pennsylvania's 19th congressional district 1911–1913	Succeeded by Warren W. Bailey
