= Schofield =

Schofield may refer to:

== People ==
- Schofield (name), including a list of people and fictional characters with the name

== Places ==
- Schofield, Missouri, United States
- Schofield, Wisconsin, United States
- Schofields, New South Wales, Australia

== Other uses ==
- Schofield Barracks, Hawaii, a U.S. Army installation
- Schofield revolver, a variant of the Smith & Wesson Model 3
- Schofield tank, a New Zealand tank design of the Second World War

== See also ==
- Schofields (disambiguation)
- Scofield (disambiguation)
- Scholefield, a surname
