= 207th Pennsylvania Infantry Regiment =

Union Army infantry regiment

207th Pennsylvania Volunteer Infantry
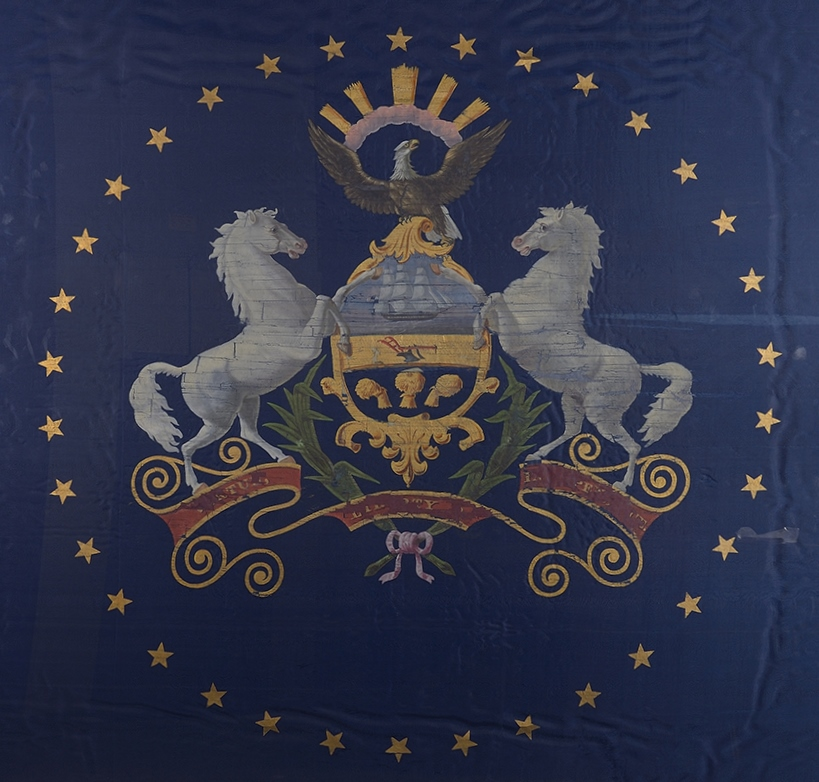
- State Flag of Pennsylvania, circa 1863.
- Active: 8 September 1864 – 31 May 1865
- Country: United States of America
- Allegiance: Union
- Branch: Union Army
- Role: Infantry
- Engagements: American Civil War

The 207th Regiment Pennsylvania Volunteer Infantry was an infantry regiment of the Union Army in the American Civil War. Raised mostly in northern and central Pennsylvania in mid-1864, the regiment initially served with the Army of the James during the Siege of Petersburg, holding trenches at Bermuda Hundred. In late November it transferred to the Army of the Potomac and during the northern hemisphere spring campaign fought in the counterattack during the Battle of Fort Stedman and the Union breakthrough at Petersburg. During last days of the Appomattox Campaign it guarded the supply line, and participated in the Grand Review of the Armies following the end of the war before mustering out.

== History ==
=== Formation and Army of the James service ===
The 207th Pennsylvania was raised in northern and central Pennsylvania beginning in mid-July 1864 in response to President Abraham Lincoln's call for 500,000 men. Companies A, D, H, and K as well as parts of Companies B, E, and G were composed of men recruited in Tioga County, Company C recruited in Clinton County, Company F in Cumberland and Franklin Counties, Company I in Lycoming County, and the remainder of Companies B, E, and G in Bradford, York, and Lancaster Counties. The ten companies of the regiment moved to Camp Curtin near Harrisburg, where they were organized on 8 September under the command of volunteer officer Colonel Robert C. Cox, the former major of the 171st Pennsylvania Infantry.

After completing its organization, the 207th Pennsylvania was sent to the front on 12 September and spent the next four days waiting for orders before it was assigned to the Provisional Brigade of the Defenses of Bermuda Hundred of the Army of the James in the Siege of Petersburg. The regiment served on picket duty at Bermuda Hundred. Fraternization between the opposing pickets was routine, but this state of affairs ended when Confederate division commander George Pickett launched a night attack on 17 November. The regiment was moved forward to support the pickets, losing two killed and several wounded in the fighting.

=== Army of the Potomac service during late 1864 and early 1865 ===
The 207th transferred to the IX Corps of the Army of the Potomac on 24 November, and participated in a demonstration on the left flank without fighting. After returning to the corps lines, it encamped on the Army Line Railroad near Fort Prescott on the extreme right flank. The Provisional Brigade was organized during December into the 3rd Division of the corps, commanded by Brigadier General John F. Hartranft. The 207th became part of the 2nd Brigade of Colonel Joseph A. Mathews alongside the 205th and 211th Pennsylvania. During the northern hemisphere winter of 1864–1865, the regiment conducted training and participated in several forays without participating in fighting, including support of the Weldon Railroad expedition between 7 and 11 December, and the Battle of Hatcher's Run from 5 to 7 February 1865. At Hatcher's Run, Cox took temporary command of the brigade and the regiment went into line of battle when it reached the creek as there was heavy fighting to the left of the regiment. The 207th fortified its position with log and earth breastworks at night, expecting an attack. However, no Confederate attack occurred and the regiment returned to camp after spending four days in the rain, sleet, and snow.

=== Fort Stedman ===
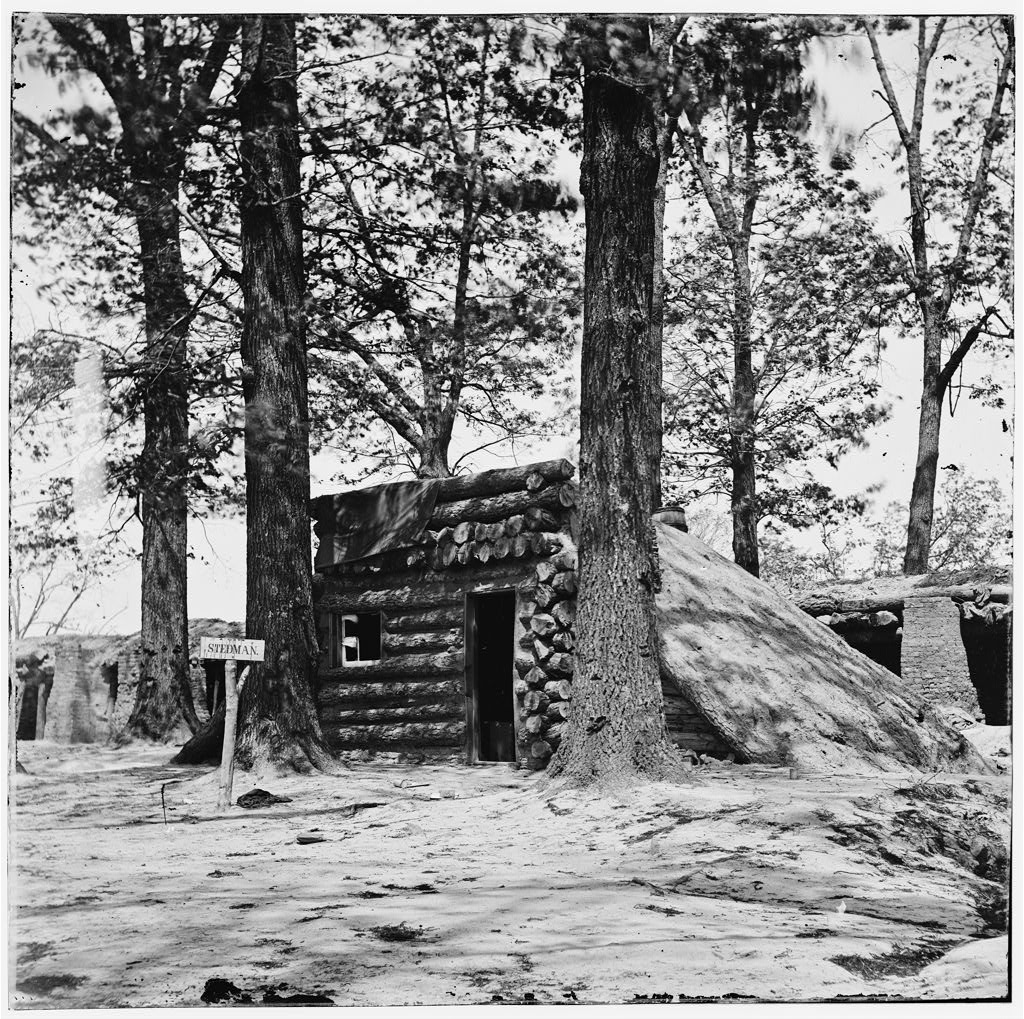
A bombproof at Fort Stedman

When Fort Stedman was captured by a Confederate attack before dawn on 25 March, the regiment was in camp. The regiment marched initially at the double quick towards the division headquarters at the Avery House in response to Hartranft's order, then at a quick step advanced into a ravine to a point almost across from the fort, sheltering beneath a bank. Despite heavy fire, the regiment suffered few casualties there due to the cover. When the 211th Pennsylvania with Hartranft leading began the advance, the regiment followed, but shortly afterwards Mathews ordered a halt. Cox led four companies into the fort with the advanced lines, having failed to receive the order. After a brief pause, the other six companies advanced into the breastworks and redoubt to the left of the fort, capturing numerous prisoners and a battle flag, as the Confederate troops retreated, believing the exposed 211th Pennsylvania, formed in a line of battle, to be stronger than it was. Due to its concealed position and rapid advance, the 207th lost one killed and sixteen wounded in the recapture of the west angle of the fort. After the recapture of the fort, the regiment returned to camp.

=== Petersburg breakthrough and Appomattox ===
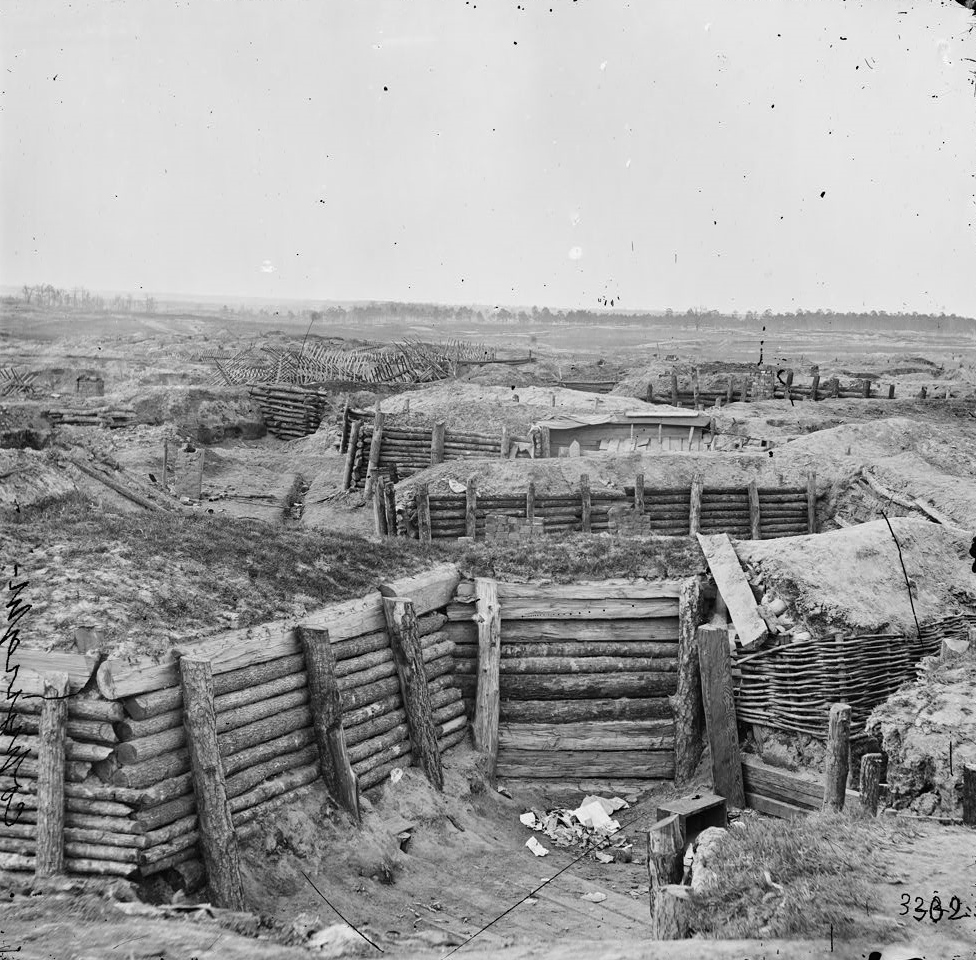
Confederate defenses of Fort Mahone at Petersburg, Virginia, 1865, where the regiment fought on 2 April

The regiment fought in the Appomattox Campaign between 28 March and 9 April, during which it participated in the Union breakthrough at Petersburg on 2 April. The regiment prepared for the assault along with the rest of the division on the night of 30 March, but it was postponed until the morning of 2 April. Shortly after 03:00, it advanced from the camp and formed in a line of battle directly in front of Fort Sedgwick with its left on the Jerusalem Plank Road, the forward regiment of the brigade. Cox led the regiment through a hail of fire across the Confederate picket line and the quickly dismantled chevaux-de-frise to overrun the main Confederate line; the regimental colors were planted on the parapet of the fort commanding the road. The commingled regiments of the brigade then turned to the left and seized three other fortifications and captured five cannon, which were turned around against the Confederate troops.

The regiment repulsed multiple counterattacks in fierce fighting, during which Cox temporarily relieved the ill Mathews in command of the brigade at 10:00. The regimental position was partially enfiladed by a Confederate battery on the left flank, and after it ran out of captured Confederate ammunition sent squads back to Fort Sedgwick across exposed ground under fire for more ammunition. Despite suffering many casualties in crossing the space, the squads brought back enough ammunition to last until 16:00, when the Confederate fire ended. In the battle, the regiment lost 37 killed, 140 wounded (including ten officers), and eight missing for a total of 185 casualties. Among those killed was one company commander, and two lieutenants were mortally wounded. Sergeant Charles H. Ilgenfritz of Company E was awarded the Medal of Honor for planting the regimental colors on the parapet of the fort commanding the road after the color bearer was shot.

On the night of 2–3 April, the Confederate Army of Northern Virginia retreated from Petersburg, which the division entered on the following morning, meeting no resistance. During the pursuit of the Confederate forces it guarded the supply lines as the army advanced along the Southside Railroad, receiving news of the Confederate surrender at Burkeville on 9 April. The 207th remained there for several weeks, serving on picket duty while also guarding and paroling Confederate prisoners of war. On 21 April it moved to City Point and lastly Alexandria on 28 April, where it remained until mustering out. After participating in the Grand Review of the Armies on 23 May, it mustered out on 31 May, with the recruits transferred to the 51st Pennsylvania. During it service, the regiment lost three officers and 51 men killed or mortally wounded, and one officer and 24 men to disease, for a total of 79.

In 1866, Cox was recognized "for gallant and meritorious services at Forts Stedman and Sedgwick, Va., April 2, 1865" when he was nominated by President Andrew Johnson and approved by the U.S. Senate for the rank of brigadier-general by brevet.

== Monuments ==
The designation of the 207th Pennsylvania is inscribed on the monument to Hartranft's division on the site of Fort Mahone in Petersburg. Its 1909 dedication was attended by veterans of the regiment and the entire division.

== See also ==
- List of Pennsylvania Civil War regiments
- Pennsylvania in the Civil War
