= Pennsylvania's 19th congressional district =

Former U.S. House district in Pennsylvania

Coordinates: 39.8072°N 76.9847°W

- Obsolete district
- Created: 1830
- Eliminated: 2010
- Years active: 1833-2013

Pennsylvania's 19th congressional district was a congressional district that became obsolete for the 113th Congress in 2013, due to Pennsylvania's slower population growth compared to the rest of the nation.

In its last incarnation, the district included all of Adams and York Counties, and parts of Cumberland County. The last representative was Republican Todd Russell Platts, who decided to retire at the end of the 112th Congress.

Most of the 19th district remained intact and was renumbered as the 4th district.

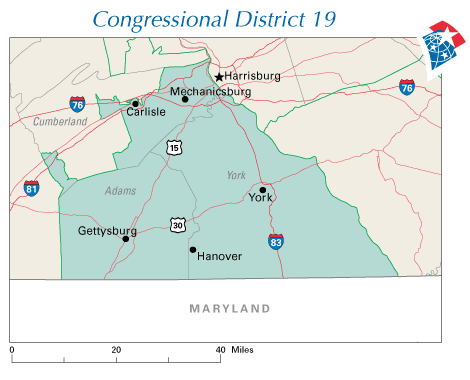
The district from 2003 to 2013

== List of members representing the district ==
Representatives	Party	Years	Cong ress	Electoral history
District established March 4, 1833
Richard Coulter (Greensburg)	Jacksonian	March 4, 1833 – March 3, 1835	23rd	Redistricted from the 17th district and re-elected in 1832. Lost re-election.
John Klingensmith Jr. (Stewartsville)	Jacksonian	March 4, 1835 – March 3, 1837	24th	Elected in 1834. Re-elected in 1836. Became secretary of the Land Office of Pennsylvania.
John Klingensmith Jr. (Stewartsville)	Democratic	March 4, 1837 – March 3, 1839	25th	Elected in 1834. Re-elected in 1836. Became secretary of the Land Office of Pennsylvania.
Albert G. Marchand (Greensburg)	Democratic	March 4, 1839 – March 3, 1843	26th 27th	Elected in 1838. Re-elected in 1840. Retired.
Henry D. Foster (Greensburg)	Democratic	March 4, 1843 – March 3, 1847	28th 29th	Elected in 1843. Re-elected in 1844. Retired.
Job Mann (Bedford)	Democratic	March 4, 1847 – March 3, 1851	30th 31st	Elected in 1846. Re-elected in 1848. Retired.
Joseph H. Kuhns (Greensburg)	Whig	March 4, 1851 – March 3, 1853	32nd	Elected in 1850. Lost re-election.
Augustus Drum (Indiana)	Democratic	March 4, 1853 – March 3, 1855	33rd	Elected in 1852. Lost re-election.
John Covode (Lockport Station)	Opposition	March 4, 1855 – March 3, 1857	34th 35th 36th 37th	Elected in 1854. Re-elected in 1856. Re-elected in 1858. Re-elected in 1860. Retired.
John Covode (Lockport Station)	Republican	March 4, 1857 – March 3, 1863	34th 35th 36th 37th	Elected in 1854. Re-elected in 1856. Re-elected in 1858. Re-elected in 1860. Retired.
Glenni W. Scofield (Warren)	Republican	March 4, 1863 – March 3, 1873	38th 39th 40th 41st 42nd	Elected in 1862. Re-elected in 1864. Re-elected in 1866. Re-elected in 1868. Re-elected in 1870. Redistricted to the At-large district
Carlton B. Curtis (Erie)	Republican	March 4, 1873 – March 3, 1875	43rd	Elected in 1872. Lost re-election.
Levi Maish (York)	Democratic	March 4, 1875 – March 3, 1879	44th 45th	Elected in 1874. Re-elected in 1876. Lost re-election.
Frank E. Beltzhoover (Carlisle)	Democratic	March 4, 1879 – March 3, 1883	46th 47th	Elected in 1878. Re-elected in 1880. Retired.
William A. Duncan (Gettysburg)	Democratic	March 4, 1883 – November 14, 1884	48th	Elected in 1882. Died.
Vacant		November 14, 1884 – December 23, 1884	48th	
John A. Swope (Gettysburg)	Democratic	December 23, 1884 – March 3, 1885	48th	Elected to finish Duncan's term.
Vacant		March 4, 1885 – November 3, 1885	48th	
John A. Swope (Gettysburg)	Democratic	November 3, 1885 – March 3, 1887	48th 49th	Elected to finish Duncan's term. Re-elected in 1884. [data missing]
Levi Maish (York)	Democratic	March 4, 1887 – March 3, 1891	50th 51st	Elected in 1886. Re-elected in 1888. Lost re-election.
Frank E. Beltzhoover (Carlisle)	Democratic	March 4, 1891 – March 3, 1895	52nd 53rd	Elected in 1890. Re-elected in 1892. Retired.
James A. Stahle (Emigsville)	Republican	March 4, 1895 – March 3, 1897	54th	Elected in 1894. Retired.
George J. Benner (Gettysburg)	Democratic	March 4, 1897 – March 3, 1899	55th	Elected in 1896. Retired.
Edward D. Ziegler (York)	Democratic	March 4, 1899 – March 3, 1901	56th	Elected in 1898. Lost re-election.
Robert J. Lewis (York)	Republican	March 4, 1901 – March 3, 1903	57th	Elected in 1900. Retired.
Alvin Evans (Ebensburg)	Republican	March 4, 1903 – March 3, 1905	58th	Redistricted from the 20th district and re-elected in 1902. [data missing]
John M. Reynolds (Bedford)	Republican	March 4, 1905 – January 17, 1911	59th 60th 61st	Elected in 1904. Re-elected in 1906. Re-elected in 1908. Resigned to become Lieutenant Governor
Vacant		January 17, 1911 – March 3, 1911	62nd	
Jesse L. Hartman (Hollidaysburg)	Republican	March 4, 1911 – March 3, 1913	62nd	Elected in 1910. Lost re-election.
Warren W. Bailey (Johnstown)	Democratic	March 4, 1913 – March 3, 1917	63rd 64th	Elected in 1912. Re-elected in 1914. Lost re-election.
John M. Rose (Johnstown)	Republican	March 4, 1917 – March 3, 1923	65th 66th 67th	Elected in 1916. Re-elected in 1918. Re-elected in 1920. Retired.
Frank C. Sites (Harrisburg)	Democratic	March 4, 1923 – March 3, 1925	68th	Elected in 1922. Lost re-election.
Joshua W. Swartz (Harrisburg)	Republican	March 4, 1925 – March 3, 1927	69th	Elected in 1924. Retired.
Isaac H. Doutrich (Harrisburg)	Republican	March 4, 1927 – January 3, 1937	70th 71st 72nd 73rd 74th	Elected in 1926. Re-elected in 1928. Re-elected in 1930. Re-elected in 1932. Re-elected in 1934. Lost re-election.
Guy J. Swope (Harrisburg)	Democratic	January 3, 1937 – January 3, 1939	75th	Elected in 1936. Lost re-election.
John C. Kunkel (Harrisburg)	Republican	January 3, 1939 – January 3, 1945	76th 77th 78th	Elected in 1938. Re-elected in 1940. Re-elected in 1942. Redistricted to the 18th district.
Leon H. Gavin (Oil City)	Republican	January 3, 1945 – January 3, 1953	79th 80th 81st 82nd	Redistricted from the 20th district and re-elected in 1944. Re-elected in 1946. Re-elected in 1948. Re-elected in 1950. Redistricted to the 23rd district.
S. Walter Stauffer (York)	Republican	January 3, 1953 – January 3, 1955	83rd	Elected in 1952. Lost re-election.
James M. Quigley (Highland Park)	Democratic	January 3, 1955 – January 3, 1957	84th	Elected in 1954. Lost re-election.
S. Walter Stauffer (York)	Republican	January 3, 1957 – January 3, 1959	85th	Elected in 1956. Lost re-election.
James M. Quigley (Camp Hill)	Democratic	January 3, 1959 – January 3, 1961	86th	Elected in 1958. Lost re-election.
George A. Goodling (Loganville)	Republican	January 3, 1961 – January 3, 1965	87th 88th	Elected in 1960. Re-elected in 1962. Lost re-election.
Nathaniel N. Craley Jr. (York)	Democratic	January 3, 1965 – January 3, 1967	89th	Elected in 1964. Lost re-election.
George A. Goodling (Loganville)	Republican	January 3, 1967 – January 3, 1975	90th 91st 92nd 93rd	Elected in 1966. Re-elected in 1968. Re-elected in 1970. Re-elected in 1972. Retired.
William F. Goodling (Jacobus)	Republican	January 3, 1975 – January 3, 2001	94th 95th 96th 97th 98th 99th 100th 101st 102nd 103rd 104th 105th 106th	Elected in 1974. Re-elected in 1976. Re-elected in 1978. Re-elected in 1980. Re-elected in 1982. Re-elected in 1984. Re-elected in 1986. Re-elected in 1988. Re-elected in 1990. Re-elected in 1992. Re-elected in 1994. Re-elected in 1996. Re-elected in 1998. Retired.
Todd R. Platts (York)	Republican	January 3, 2001 – January 3, 2013	107th 108th 109th 110th 111th 112th	Elected in 2000. Re-elected in 2002. Re-elected in 2004. Re-elected in 2006. Re-elected in 2008. Re-elected in 2010. Retired.
District dissolved January 3, 2013
