= James M. Quigley =

American politician (1918–2011)

James Quigley
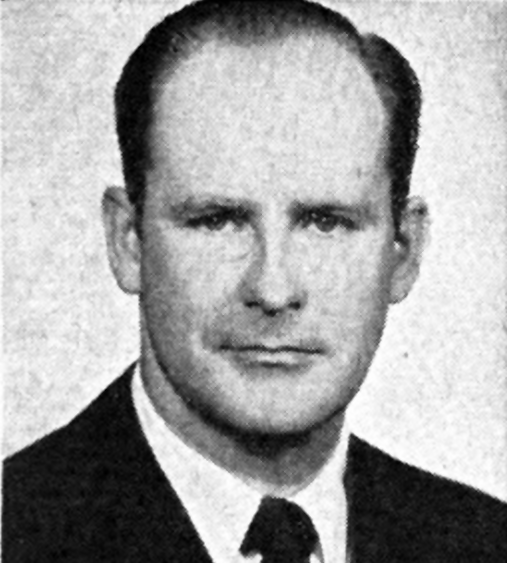

Member of the U.S. House of Representatives from Pennsylvania's 19th district
- In office January 3, 1955 – January 3, 1957
- Preceded by: S. Walter Stauffer
- Succeeded by: S. Walter Stauffer
- In office January 3, 1959 – January 3, 1961
- Preceded by: S. Walter Stauffer
- Succeeded by: George Atlee Goodling

Personal details
- Born: March 30, 1918 Mount Carmel, Pennsylvania, US
- Died: December 15, 2011 (aged 93) Washington, D.C., US
- Party: Democratic Party (United States)

James Michael Quigley (March 30, 1918 – December 15, 2011) was an American lawyer, World War II veteran, and politician who served two nonconsecutive terms as a United States representative from Pennsylvania from 1955 to 1957 and from 1959 to 1961.

== Background ==
James Quigley was born in Mount Carmel, Pennsylvania. He graduated from Villanova University in 1939 and from the Dickinson School of Law in Carlisle, Pennsylvania in 1942.

== Career ==
=== World War II ===
He served in the United States Navy from 1943 to 1946, as a communications officer on the destroyer USS Hart (DD-594). He was engaged in the Philippines campaign, 1944-45 and Battle of Okinawa campaigns, and after V-J Day served with the occupation forces in Korea and China.

=== Congress ===
Upon his return to the US, Quigley resumed his law practice in Harrisburg, Pennsylvania.

He was unsuccessful as a Democratic candidate for election in United States House election, 1950, but he was elected as a Democrat to the 84th United States Congress. He was an unsuccessful candidate in United States House election, 1956 and in 1957 he became the administrative assistant to Senator Joseph S. Clark of Pennsylvania, and assistant attorney general for Pennsylvania in 1958.

He was again elected to the 86th United States Congress in United States House election, 1958, but was an unsuccessful candidate for reelection in United States House election, 1960, losing to Republican George A. Goodling.

==== Federal appointment ====
He was appointed Assistant Secretary of Health, Education, and Welfare for Federal and State matters on February 24, 1961, serving until January 1966. He was appointed Commissioner of the Federal Water Pollution Control Administration serving from January 1966 to January 1968.

=== Private practice ===
He worked as vice president of the United States Plywood-Champion Papers, Inc., from 1968 to 1986.

== Personal life and death ==
Quigley married Genevieve Morgan Quigley. They had six children. Their son, James M. Quigley, MD predeceased them in 2006; five daughters survived.

He died on December 15, 2011, in Washington, D.C., and was interred at Gate of Heaven Cemetery in Silver Spring, Maryland.

U.S. House of Representatives
Preceded by S. Walter Stauffer	Member of the U.S. House of Representatives from Pennsylvania's 19th congressional district 1955–1957	Succeeded by S. Walter Stauffer
Preceded by S. Walter Stauffer	Member of the U.S. House of Representatives from Pennsylvania's 19th congressional district 1959–1961	Succeeded by George Atlee Goodling
