= Charles Matthews (Pennsylvania politician) =

American politician

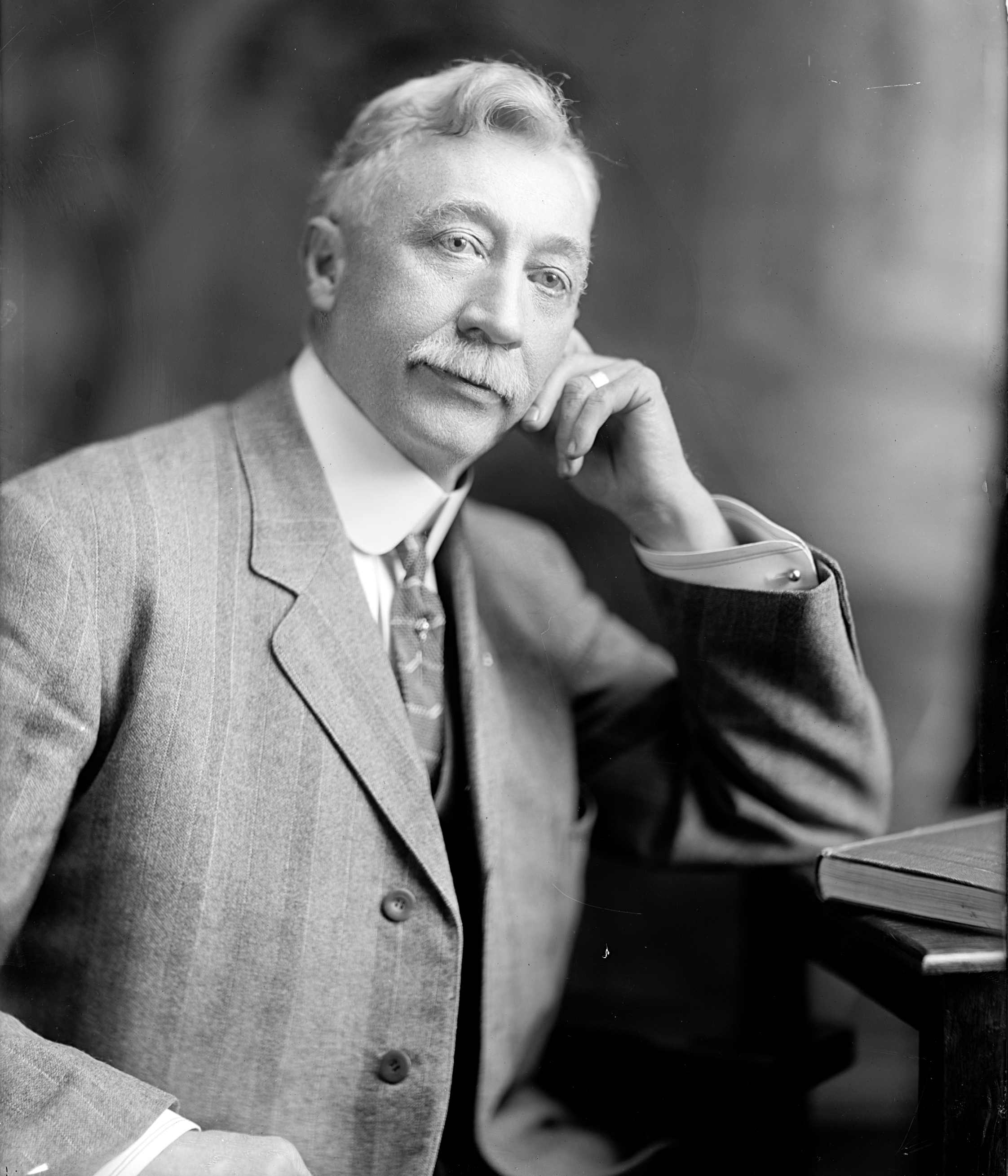
- Matthews (between 1905 and 1932)
- Born: October 15, 1856; New Castle, Pennsylvania
- Died: December 12, 1932 (aged 76); New Castle, Pennsylvania

Charles Matthews (October 15, 1856 – December 12, 1932) was a Republican member of the U.S. House of Representatives from Pennsylvania.

== Biography ==
Charles Matthews was born in New Castle, Pennsylvania on October 15, 1856, and was employed by a rolling mill as a roll turner while attending night school.

A delegate to the Republican State convention in 1886, he was a member of the city council from 1887 to 1893, and sheriff of Lawrence County, Pennsylvania, from 1897 to 1900.

He was then engaged in manufacturing and banking.

Elected as a Republican to the Sixty-second Congress, he was an unsuccessful candidate for reelection in 1912, and resumed his work in banking.

A delegate to the 1916 Republican National Convention in Chicago, he was appointed county commissioner of Lawrence County on November 26, 1924, and served until January 2, 1928.

== Death and interment ==
Matthews died in New Castle on December 12, 1932, and was interred in the Graceland Cemetery.

U.S. House of Representatives
Preceded by John K. Tener	Member of the U.S. House of Representatives from Pennsylvania's 24th congressional district 1911–1913	Succeeded by Henry W. Temple
