= Robert S. Murphy =

American politician

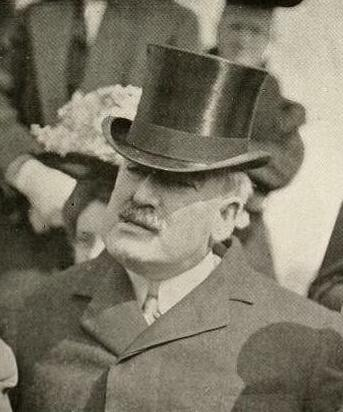
- Murphy in 1908

9th Lieutenant Governor of Pennsylvania
- In office January 15, 1907 – January 17, 1911
- Governor: Edwin Sydney Stuart
- Preceded by: William M. Brown
- Succeeded by: John Merriman Reynolds

Personal details
- Born: October 18, 1861 Louisville, New York, US
- Died: June 24, 1912 (aged 50)
- Party: Republican

Robert S. Murphy (October 18, 1861 – June 24, 1912) was an American lawyer and politician who served as the ninth lieutenant governor of Pennsylvania from 1907 to 1911. A Republican, Murphy was born in Louisville, New York, but spent most of his childhood in the area of Portland, Maine, where his father, Francis Murphy, was a temperance evangelist.

Murphy attended Hedding College and the Pennington School and in 1880 moved to Johnstown, Pennsylvania. He was admitted to the Cambria County bar in 1881 and practiced law alongside his brother. Murphy successfully ran as a Republican for Cambria County District Attorney in 1892, despite the overwhelming Democratic majority in terms of party registration. He was reelected in 1895 but defeated in 1898. He returned to the practice of law and became a key figure in the Pennsylvania Republican Party, giving a fiery speech nominating John P. Elkin for governor at the Pennsylvania Republican convention of 1892 and serving as a delegate to the Republican National Convention in 1900. His political career culminated in his election as lieutenant governor in 1906 as running mate of Edwin Sydney Stuart. He served one four-year term in office.

Murphy died suddenly of apoplexy at his home in Overbrook, Pittsburgh, at the age of 51.

Political offices
Preceded by William M. Brown	Lieutenant Governor of Pennsylvania; 1907–1911	Succeeded by John Merriman Reynolds
Party political offices
Preceded by William M. Brown	Republican nominee for Lieutenant Governor of Pennsylvania; 1906	Succeeded by John Merriman Reynolds
