= William M. Brown (Pennsylvania politician) =

American politician

William Brown
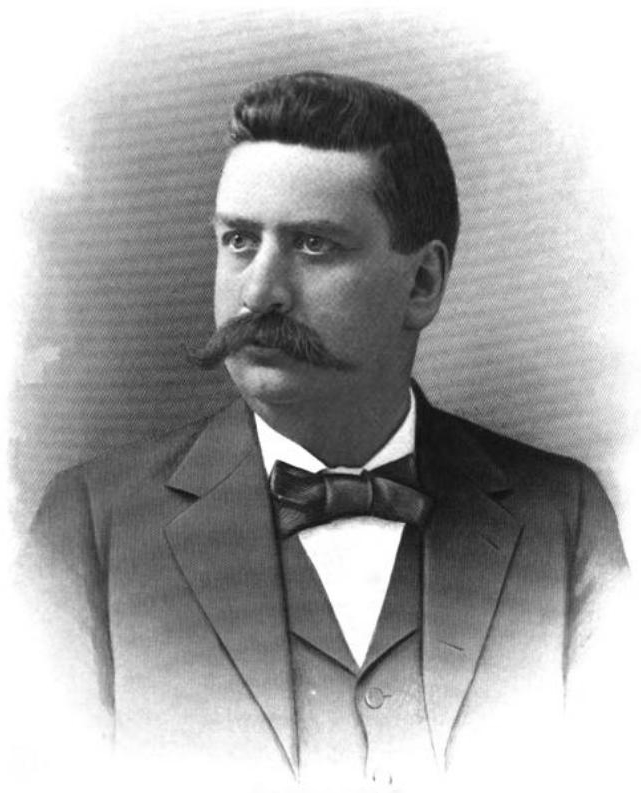

Member-elect of the U.S. House of Representatives from Pennsylvania's 24th district
- In office November 3, 1914 – January 31, 1915^{[a]}
- Preceded by: Henry Temple
- Succeeded by: Henry Temple

8th Lieutenant Governor of Pennsylvania
- In office January 20, 1903 – January 15, 1907
- Governor: Samuel W. Pennypacker
- Preceded by: John P. S. Gobin
- Succeeded by: Robert S. Murphy

Member of the Pennsylvania Senate from the 47th district
- In office January 5, 1897 – April 20, 1899
- Preceded by: James Fruit
- Succeeded by: James Emery

Personal details
- Born: September 20, 1850 Greenville, Pennsylvania, U.S.
- Died: January 31, 1915 (aged 64) New York City, New York, U.S.
- Party: Republican
- a.Brown died before he could be sworn in and seated, though the election results were certified by the House.

William M. Brown (September 20, 1850 – January 31, 1915) was a Republican political official from Pennsylvania.

== Background ==
Brown was born in Greenville, Pennsylvania but grew up in Iowa, where his family purchased a farm following the death of his father. In 1869, he moved to New Castle, Pennsylvania and found employment as a bookkeeper for First National Bank. He was admitted to the bar as an attorney in 1876. In 1883, Brown took a job negotiating homesteading contracts for the federal government, which required him to return for two years to Iowa. He moved back to New Castle in 1885, where he opened a department store and helped to finance the city's streetcar line. Brown was soon elected as a Republican to city council.

In 1896, Brown was elected to the Pennsylvania State Senate, serving one term from 1897 to 1899. In 1902, he was elected lieutenant governor, alongside gubernatorial candidate Samuel Pennypacker, and served from 1903 until 1907.

At the end of his term in Harrisburg, Brown returned to New Castle and invested in banking and railroad interests. In 1914 he was elected to the United States House of Representatives, but died from pneumonia in New York City on January 31, 1915, before he was able to take office.

== See also ==
- List of United States representatives-elect who never took their seats

Party political offices
| Preceded by John P. S. Gobin | Republican nominee for Lieutenant Governor of Pennsylvania; 1902 | Succeeded by Robert S. Murphy |
Pennsylvania State Senate
| Preceded by James Fruit | Member of the Pennsylvania Senate for the 47th district 1897–1899 | Succeeded by James Emery |
Political offices
| Preceded by John P. S. Gobin | Lieutenant Governor of Pennsylvania; 1903–1907 | Succeeded by Robert Murphy |
U.S. House of Representatives
| Preceded by Henry Temple | Member-elect of the U.S. House of Representatives from Pennsylvania's 24th congressional district 1914–1915 | Succeeded by Henry Temple |
