= Warren W. Bailey =

American politician (1855–1928)

Warren Worth Bailey
- Portrait by Harris & Ewing c. 1913–1917

Member of the U.S. House of Representatives from Pennsylvania's 19th district
- In office March 4, 1913 – March 3, 1917
- Preceded by: Jesse Lee Hartman
- Succeeded by: John Marshall Rose

Personal details
- Born: January 8, 1855 New Winchester, Indiana, U.S.
- Died: November 9, 1928 (aged 73)
- Party: Democratic

Warren Worth Bailey (January 8, 1855 – November 9, 1928) was a Democratic member of the U.S. House of Representatives from Pennsylvania and a Georgist publisher. He and other Georgists led in framing the U.S. income tax law of 1916, which exempted most labor income and targeted land rent.

== Early life ==
Warren W. Bailey was born in New Winchester, Indiana. He moved to Illinois with his parents in 1863 and settled in Edgar County, Illinois. He attended the country schools, and worked as a telegrapher until 1875.

== Newspaper work ==
He joined the Kansas News in Kansas, Illinois, and learned the printing trade. He was engaged in the publishing business with his brother at Carlisle, Indiana, in 1877. Subsequently, they purchased the Vincennes News, which they published until 1887. He moved to Chicago in 1887 and became a member of the staff of the Chicago Daily News and later of the Evening Mail. He moved to Johnstown, Pennsylvania, in 1893 and published the Jonestown Democrat, devoted to the single-tax principle.

== Political life ==
Bailey was an unsuccessful Democratic candidate for election in 1906. He was a delegate at large to the 1912 Democratic National Convention at Baltimore. He was elected as a Democrat to the Sixty-third and Sixty-fourth Congresses. He was chairman of the United States House Committee on Mileage during the Sixty-third Congress, and of the United States House Committee on Expenditures in the Department of Justice during the Sixty-fourth Congress. He was an unsuccessful candidate for reelection in 1916 and for election in 1920, 1922, and 1926. He unsuccessfully contested the election of Anderson Howell Walters to the Sixty-ninth Congress. He resumed journalism in Johnstown, where he died in 1928. Interment in Grandview Cemetery, Johnstown.

== Sources ==
- United States Congress. "Warren W. Bailey (id: B000050)". Biographical Directory of the United States Congress.
- The Political Graveyard

U.S. House of Representatives
Preceded by Jesse Lee Hartman	Member of the U.S. House of Representatives from Pennsylvania's 19th congressional district 1913–1917	Succeeded by John Marshall Rose
