= Henry W. Temple =

American politician (1864–1955)

Henry Wilson Temple
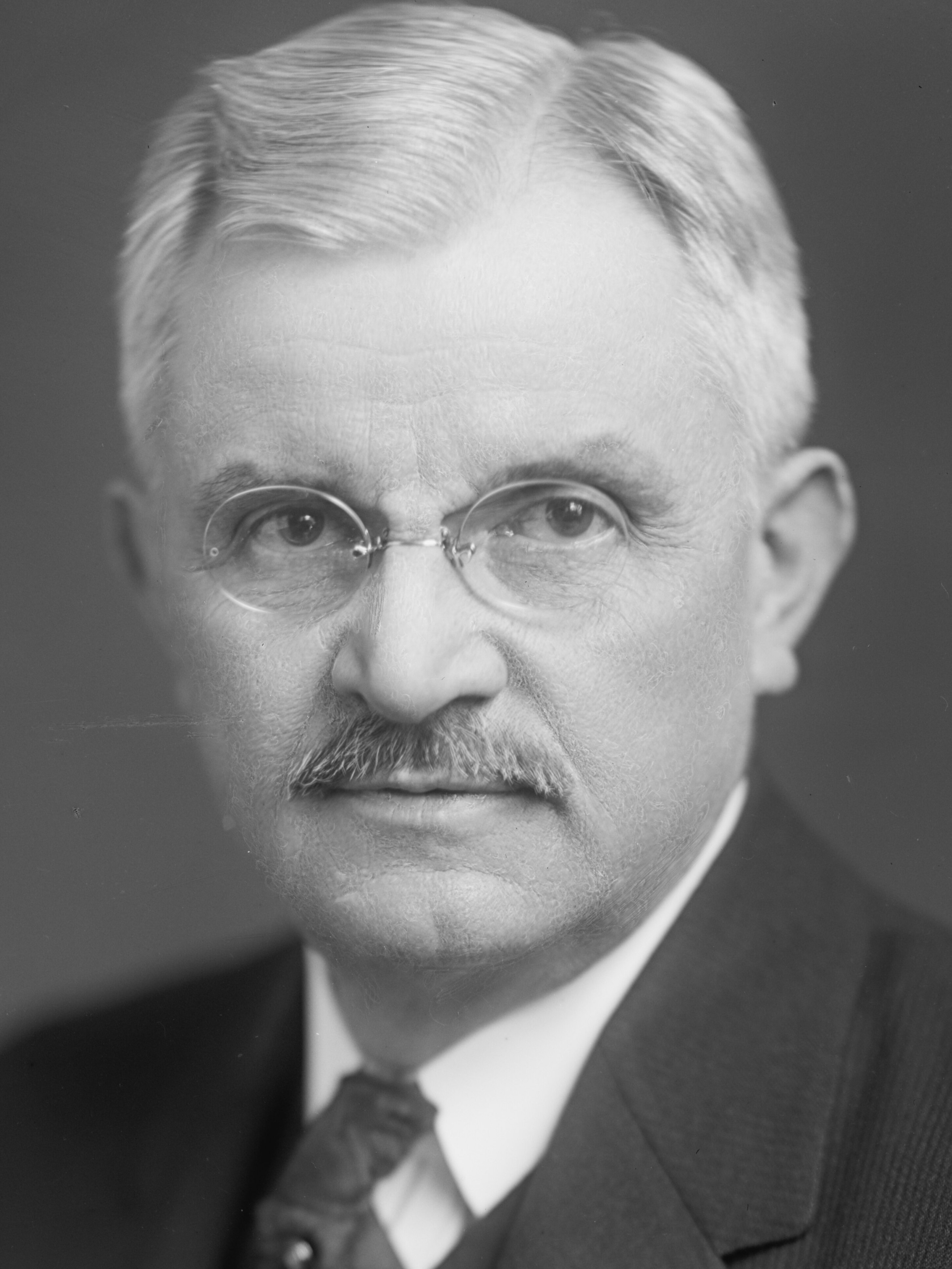

Member of the U.S. House of Representatives from Pennsylvania
- In office March 4, 1913 – March 3, 1915
- Preceded by: Charles Matthews
- Succeeded by: William Brown (as representative-elect)
- Constituency: 24th district
- In office November 2, 1915 – March 3, 1933
- Preceded by: William Brown (as representative-elect)
- Succeeded by: Charles I. Faddis
- Constituency: 24th district (1915–23); 25th district (1923–33)

Personal details
- Born: Henry W. Temple; March 31, 1864 Belle Center, Ohio, U.S.
- Died: January 11, 1955 (aged 90) Washington, Pennsylvania, U.S.
- Resting place: Washington Cemetery; 40.15690°N 80.25440°W
- Party: Republican (before 1912); Progressive (1912–15); Republican (1915–55)
- Spouse: Lucy Parr
- Parents: John B. Temple; Martha Jameson
- Education: Geneva College; Covenanter Theological Seminary
- Occupation: Pastor; College Professor
- Profession: U.S. Congressman

Henry Wilson Temple (March 31, 1864 – January 11, 1955) was a Progressive and a Republican member of the U.S. House of Representatives from Pennsylvania.

Temple was born in Belle Center, Ohio. He graduated from Geneva College in Beaver Falls, Pennsylvania, in 1883, and from the Reformed Presbyterian Theological Seminary in Allegheny, Pennsylvania, in 1887. Before his ordination to the ministry, he worked at Reformed Presbyterian congregations in and around Mankato, Kansas. After his ordination, he served as the pastor of churches in Jefferson County, Leechburg, and Washington, Pennsylvania. He worked as professor of political science at Washington and Jefferson College in Washington, Pennsylvania, from 1898 to 1913.

Temple was elected as a Progressive to the Sixty-third Congress. He was an unsuccessful candidate for reelection to succeed himself in 1914. However, he was soon after elected to the seat as a Republican in the special election to the Sixty-fourth Congress to fill the vacancy caused by the death of Representative-elect William Brown (who had defeated him in the 1914 general election). He was reelected to the Sixty-fifth and to the seven succeeding Congresses. He was an unsuccessful candidate for reelection in 1932. He worked as professor of international relations in Washington and Jefferson College from 1933 until his retirement in 1947. He died in Washington, Pennsylvania, and is buried in Washington Cemetery.

== Sources ==
- United States Congress. "Henry W. Temple (id: T000119)". Biographical Directory of the United States Congress.
- The Political Graveyard
- His biographical sketch in an 1888 church history, page 704

U.S. House of Representatives
Preceded by Charles Matthews	Member of the U.S. House of Representatives from Pennsylvania's 24th congressional district 1913–1915	Succeeded by William Brown^{1}
Preceded by William Brown^{2}	Member of the U.S. House of Representatives from Pennsylvania's 24th congressional district 1915–1923	Succeeded by Samuel Kendall
Preceded by Milton Shreve	Member of the U.S. House of Representatives from Pennsylvania's 25th congressional district 1923–1933	Succeeded by Charles Faddis
Notes and references
1. Brown was certified as the winner of the election, but died before he could be seated.; 2. As representative-elect.
