= S. Walter Stauffer =

American politician

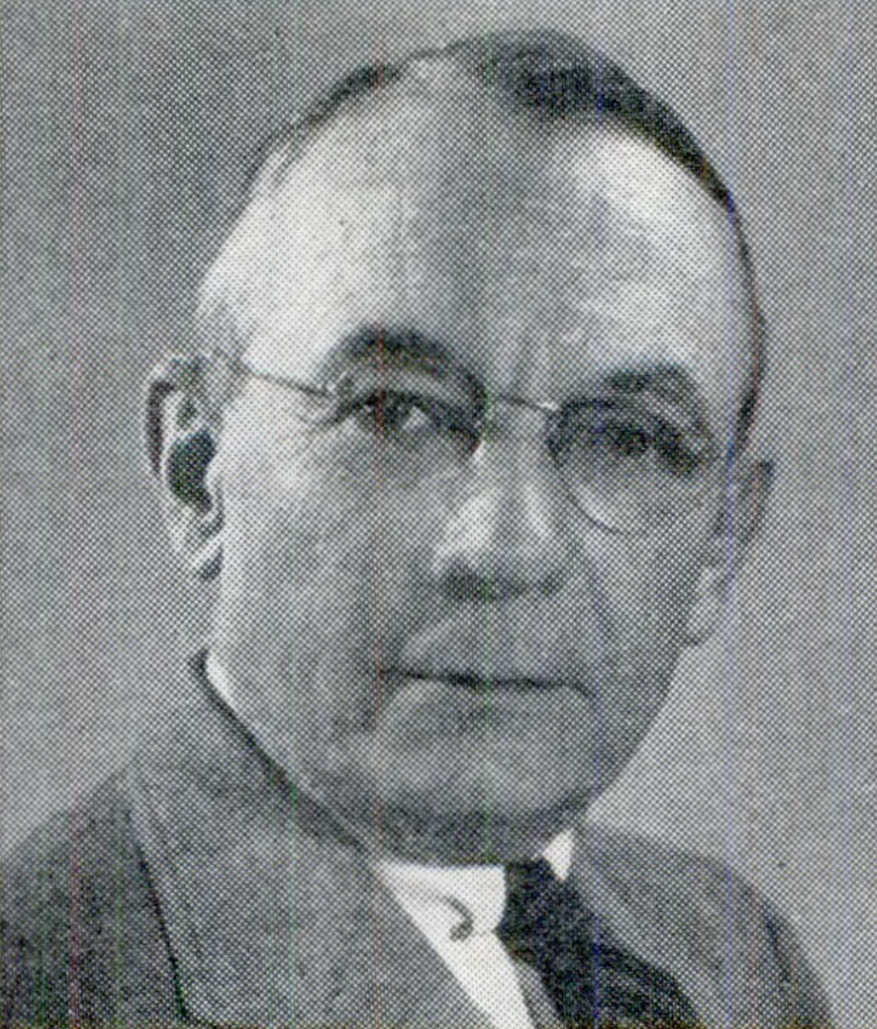

Simon Walter Stauffer (August 13, 1888 – September 26, 1975) was a United States representative from Pennsylvania.

== Early life ==
S. Walter Stauffer was born in Walkersville, Maryland, on August 13, 1888. He graduated from Dickinson College in Carlisle, Pennsylvania, in 1912.

== Career ==
He moved to York, Pennsylvania, in 1915. He was engaged in the manufacture of lime, crushed stone, and refractory dolomite from 1916 to 1936. He was a trustee of Dickinson College from 1930 until his death.

He served as president of the National Lime Association in Washington, D.C., from 1936 to 1946. He was chairman of York City Housing Authority from 1949 to 1952, and vice president and chairman of the executive committee of the York County Gas Co. from 1950 to 1960. He was also the owner of a large tract of woodland and engaged in timbering operations from 1947 to 1960.

Stauffer was elected as a Republican to the 83rd United States Congress, defeating incumbent Democratic Congressman James F. Lind, but was an unsuccessful candidate for reelection in 1954 against Democrat James M. Quigley. In a re-match against Congressman Quigley in 1956, he was elected to the 85th United States Congress, but was an unsuccessful candidate for reelection in 1958 against Quigley. Stauffer voted in favor of the Civil Rights Act of 1957.

== Death ==
Stauffer died on September 26, 1975, in York. He was interred in Prospect Hill Cemetery.

U.S. House of Representatives
Preceded by Leon H. Gavin	Member of the U.S. House of Representatives from Pennsylvania's 19th congressional district 1953–1955	Succeeded by James M. Quigley
Preceded by James M. Quigley	Member of the U.S. House of Representatives from Pennsylvania's 19th congressional district 1957–1959	Succeeded by James M. Quigley
