= Robert Jacob Lewis =

American politician

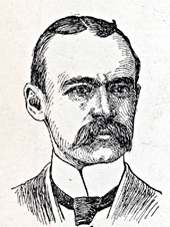

Member of the U.S. House of Representatives from Pennsylvania's 19th district
- In office March 4, 1901 – March 3, 1903
- Preceded by: Edward Danner Ziegler
- Succeeded by: Alvin Evans

Personal details
- Born: December 30, 1864 Dover, Pennsylvania, U.S.
- Died: July 24, 1933 (aged 68) Camden, Arkansas, U.S.
- Party: Republican
- Education: Yale Law School
- Profession: Politician, lawyer

Robert Jacob Lewis (December 30, 1864 – July 24, 1933) was a Republican member of the United States House of Representatives from Pennsylvania.

== Formative years ==
Robert J. Lewis was born in Dover, Pennsylvania on December 30, 1864. He attended the public schools of York, Pennsylvania and graduated from the high school in 1883.

Lewis taught in the public schools until September 1889. He graduated from the law department of Yale University in 1891 and was admitted to the New Haven, Connecticut, bar in June 1891 and to the bar of York County, Pennsylvania, August 1891. He commenced practice in York.

== Political career ==
Lewis was elected school controller of York in 1893 and reelected in 1897 and 1903. He was elected city solicitor in 1895. He was an unsuccessful candidate for election in 1898.

He was elected as a Republican to the Fifty-seventh Congress. He declined to be a candidate for renomination in 1902. He returned to the practice of law.

== Death and interment ==
Lewis died in Camden, Arkansas in 1933. His remains were cremated and the ashes were placed in the Iris Columbarium Mausoleum in St. Louis, Missouri.

== Sources ==
- United States Congress. "Robert J. Lewis (id: L000292)". Biographical Directory of the United States Congress.
- The Political Graveyard

U.S. House of Representatives
Preceded by Edward Danner Ziegler	Member of the U.S. House of Representatives from Pennsylvania's 19th congressional district 1901–1903	Succeeded by Alvin Evans
