= John Merriman Reynolds =

American politician (1848–1933)

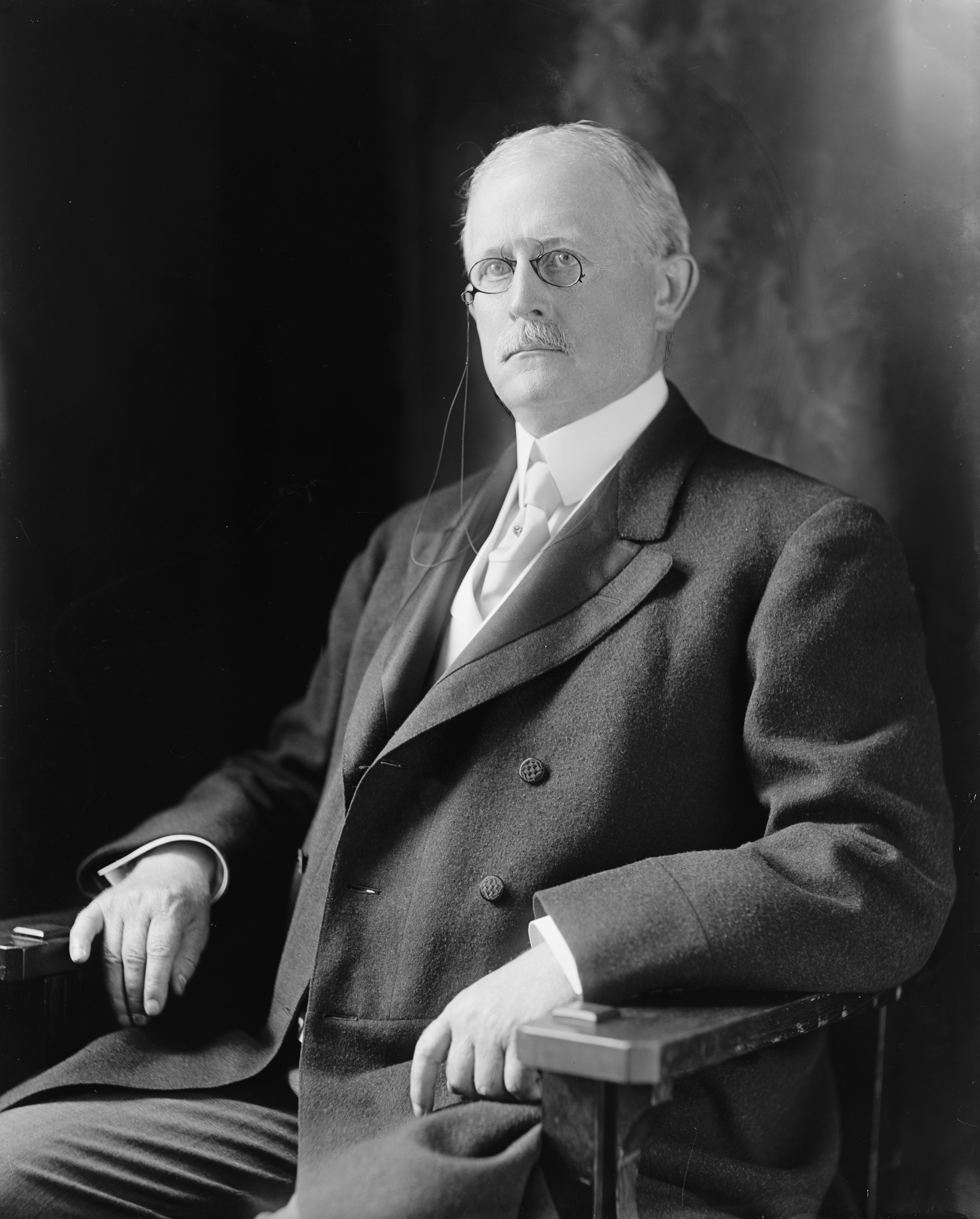
- Reynolds, 1905–1933

10th Lieutenant Governor of Pennsylvania
- In office January 17, 1911 – January 19, 1915
- Governor: John Tener
- Preceded by: Robert Murphy
- Succeeded by: Frank McClain

Member of the U.S. House of Representatives from Pennsylvania's 19th district
- In office March 4, 1905 – January 17, 1911
- Preceded by: Alvin Evans
- Succeeded by: Jesse Hartman

Member of the Pennsylvania House of Representatives from the Bedford County district
- In office January 7, 1873 – January 6, 1874

Personal details
- Born: March 5, 1848 Lancaster County, Pennsylvania, US
- Died: September 14, 1933 (aged 85)
- Party: Republican
- Other political affiliations: Democratic (Before 1896)
- Profession: Publisher, lawyer, politician, teacher

John Merriman Reynolds (March 5, 1848 – September 14, 1933) was an American lawyer, publisher, and politician from the state of Pennsylvania.

== Early life ==
Reynolds was born in Lancaster County, Pennsylvania, near Quarryville, about twelve miles south of the city of Lancaster, to parents Patrick Hewitt and Ann (née Barnett) Reynolds. His father, Patrick, was one of the well-to-do farmers of this locality and an influential citizen. He dealt quite extensively in livestock, and he also operated a grist-mill. Patrick, a native of Ireland, was eight years old when he arrived in Lancaster County with his parents.

== Education ==
John Reynolds attended the public schools in Lancaster and graduated from the First Pennsylvania State Normal School, Millersville, Pennsylvania, (now Millersville University of Pennsylvania) in 1867, and from Columbian College (now George Washington University) in Washington, D.C., in 1895.

He was principal of public schools of Bedford, Pennsylvania, 1867–1868.

He studied law, was admitted to the bar February 15, 1870, and commenced practice in Bedford. He became publisher and half-owner of the Bedford Gazette in 1872, which he edited until August 1, 1880, when he devoted full attention to his growing law practice.

== Political activities ==
=== Pennsylvania offices ===
Reynolds was elected to the Pennsylvania House of Representatives in October 1872, taking his seat in January 1873 as the youngest member of the body at age 24. He was re-elected in 1873 and was actively concerned in framing much of the legislation necessary to put in force the new constitution of the state adopted in 1873. He declined to be a candidate for re-election but was elected prosecuting attorney of Bedford County, serving from 1875 to 1879, at which time he declined renomination. In 1882, he was an unsuccessful candidate for the Pennsylvania Senate. He was president of the board of education of Bedford 1884-1900. He was a delegate to the Democratic National Conventions in 1888 and 1892. He engaged in the banking business in 1893.

=== National offices ===
President Grover Cleveland appointed Reynolds Assistant Secretary of the Interior, serving from April 15, 1893, to June 1, 1897. In 1896, unable to support the policies of the Democratic presidential candidate, William Jennings Bryan, Reynolds left the party and actively campaigned for the Republican candidate, William McKinley. In 1897, Reynolds was admitted to the bar of the Supreme Court of the United States.

==== House of Representatives ====
In November 1904, Reynolds was elected as a Republican to the United States House of Representatives for the 59th, 60th, and 61st Congresses.

=== Pennsylvania Lieutenant Governor ===
He resigned in 1911 to become the tenth lieutenant governor of Pennsylvania, which he held from January 17, 1911 to January 19, 1915. He resumed the practice of law and again engaged in banking in Bedford. He was a member of the commission to revise the banking laws of the State of Pennsylvania 1917–1925.

== Death and burial ==
Reynolds died on September 14, 1933, in Bedford and is interred in Bedford Cemetery. He was an active member of the Episcopal church, having served as vestryman, warden and superintendent of the Sunday-school. He was also a Royal Arch Mason and a Knight Templar.

Political offices
Preceded by Robert Murphy	Lieutenant Governor of Pennsylvania; 1911–1915	Succeeded by Frank McClain
U.S. House of Representatives
Preceded by Alvin Evans	Member of the U.S. House of Representatives from Pennsylvania's 19th congressional district 1905–1911	Succeeded by Jesse Hartman
Party political offices
Preceded by Robert Murphy	Republican nominee for Lieutenant Governor of Pennsylvania; 1910	Succeeded by Frank McClain
