= Levi Maish =

American politician

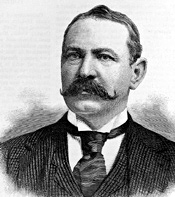

Levi Maish (November 22, 1837 – February 26, 1899) was a Democratic member of the U.S. House of Representatives from Pennsylvania.

== Early life ==
Levi Maish was born in Conewago Township, Pennsylvania. He attended the common schools and the York County Academy. He taught school in Manchester Township and in York.

== Civil War ==
During the American Civil War, Maish recruited a company for the Union Army in 1862, and because of this, joined the 130th Pennsylvania Infantry as a captain. He was promoted to lieutenant colonel because of his education. In less than two months, he was involved in the Battle of Antietam, wounded severely in the upper chest and lung, leading an advance across the cornfield in front of the initially strong defensive position of the sunken road. During his convalescence, he was promoted to colonel after the Battle of Fredericksburg. He was mustered out with his regiment at the expiration of its term of service on May 21, 1863.

== Education and Pennsylvania state service ==
Maish attended lectures in the law department of the University of Pennsylvania at Philadelphia, and was admitted to the bar in 1864. He served as a member of the Pennsylvania State House of Representatives in 1867 and 1868. He was appointed by the legislature in 1872 as one of a commission to reexamine and reaudit the accounts of certain public officers of York County, Pennsylvania.

== United States House of Representatives ==
Maish was elected as a Democrat to the Forty-fourth and Forty-fifth Congresses. He was an unsuccessful candidate for reelection in 1878. He was again elected to the Fiftieth and Fifty-first Congresses. He was an unsuccessful candidate for reelection in 1890. He was engaged in the practice of law in Washington, D.C., until his death there in 1899.

Maish was buried in Oak Hill Cemetery. He was interred in Arlington National Cemetery.

== Freemasonry ==
Maish was made a Freemason in York Lodge No. 266, F.&A.M., in York, Pennsylvania on January 6, 1863. He resigned in 1869 to become a warrant member of Zeredatha Lodge No. 451 in York, of which he was subsequently elected to serve as Worshipful Master in 1873.

U.S. House of Representatives
Preceded by Carlton B. Curtis	Member of the U.S. House of Representatives from Pennsylvania's 19th congressional district 1875–1879	Succeeded by Frank E. Beltzhoover
Preceded by John A. Swope	Member of the U.S. House of Representatives from Pennsylvania's 19th congressional district 1887–1891	Succeeded by Frank E. Beltzhoover
