= George W. Reed =

American Civil War soldier

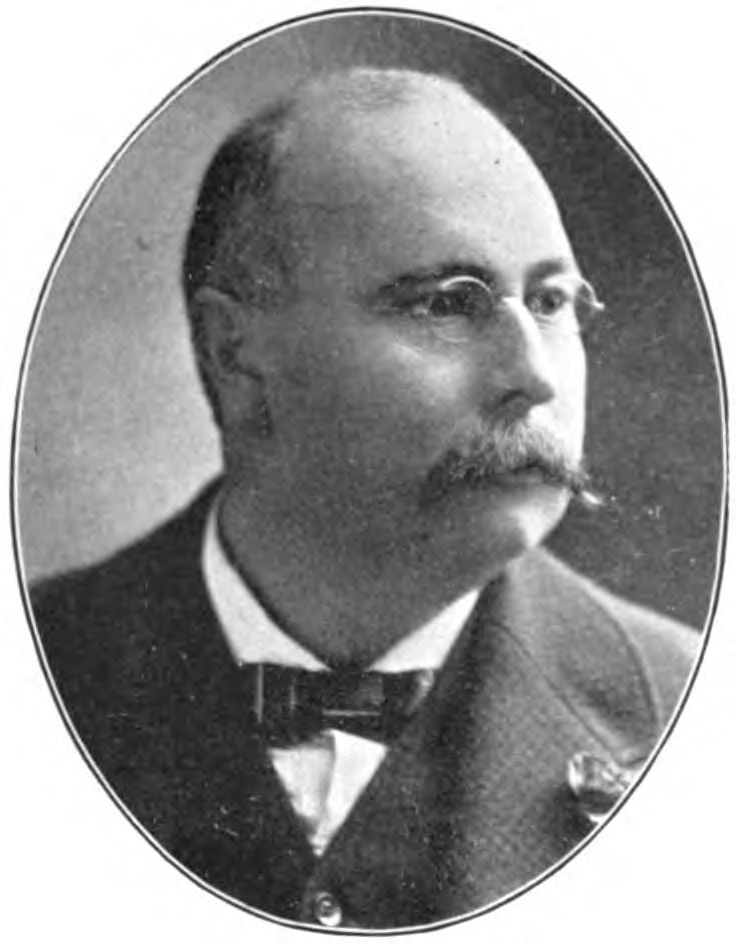
- George W. Reed 1899
- Born: c. 1831; Cambria County, Pennsylvania
- Died: December 21, 1906 (aged 74–75)
- Burial place: Grandview Cemetery, Johnstown, Pennsylvania
- Military career
- Allegiance: United States
- Branch: United States Army
- Service years: 1862 - 1865
- Rank: Corporal
- Units: Company E, 11th Pennsylvania Infantry Regiment
- Conflicts: American Civil War • Battle of Globe Tavern
- Awards: Medal of Honor

George W. Reed (c. 1831 – December 21, 1906) was a Union Army soldier in the American Civil War and a recipient of the U.S. military's highest decoration, the Medal of Honor, for his actions at the Battle of Globe Tavern.

Born in about 1831 in Cambria County, Pennsylvania, Reed was living in the city of Johnstown when he enlisted in the Army. He served as a private in Company E of the 11th Pennsylvania Infantry. During the Battle of Globe Tavern near Petersburg, Virginia, on August 21, 1864, he was captured in a thickly wooded area by a group of five Confederate soldiers, including a color bearer, from the 24th North Carolina Infantry. When it became clear that the Confederates were lost, Reed stated that they were in danger of stumbling into Union forces and being killed. He convinced the soldiers that the safest decision was to give him back his weapon and surrender themselves to him. The Confederates agreed, and Reed led them to the Union lines as his prisoners. Two weeks later, on September 6, 1864, he was awarded the Medal of Honor for his actions during the battle, specifically for capturing the flag which the Southern color bearer had held.

Reed's official Medal of Honor citation reads:

Capture of flag of 24th North Carolina Volunteers (C.S.A.)

Reed was promoted to corporal before leaving the military. He died on December 21, 1906, at age 74 or 75 and was buried at Grandview Cemetery in Johnstown, Pennsylvania. A government-issued marker was placed on his grave, however it mistakenly identified him as a Confederate soldier. A new gravestone noting his service in the Union Army and his status as a Medal of Honor recipient was dedicated at a ceremony on November 11, 2006.
