= George J. Benner =

American politician

George Jacob Benner

Member of the U.S. House of Representatives from Pennsylvania's 19th district
- In office March 4, 1897 – March 3, 1899
- Preceded by: James A. Stahle
- Succeeded by: Edward D. Ziegler

Personal details
- Born: April 13, 1859 Gettysburg, Pennsylvania
- Died: December 30, 1930 (aged 71)
- Party: Democratic

George Jacob Benner (April 13, 1859 – December 30, 1930) was a Democratic member of the U.S. House of Representatives from Pennsylvania.

George J. Benner was born in Gettysburg, Pennsylvania. He attended the public schools and was graduated from Pennsylvania College at Gettysburg, Pennsylvania, in 1878. He taught school for several years, studied law, was admitted to the Adams County, Pennsylvania, bar in 1881 and commenced practice in Gettysburg. He was a delegate to the Democratic State convention in 1886.

Benner was elected as a Democrat to the Fifty-fifth Congress. He was not a candidate for renomination in 1898. He resumed the practice of law in Gettysburg. He was an unsuccessful candidate for election as president judge of the thirty-first judicial district in 1925. He died in Gettysburg in 1930 and was buried at Evergreen Cemetery.

== Sources ==
- United States Congress. "George J. Benner (id: B000366)". Biographical Directory of the United States Congress.
- The Political Graveyard

U.S. House of Representatives
Preceded by James A. Stahle	Member of the U.S. House of Representatives from Pennsylvania's 19th congressional district 1897–1899	Succeeded by Edward D. Ziegler
