= Bryant T. Scofield =

American politician (1823–1881)

Member of the Illinois Senate
- In office 1862–1866

Personal details
- Born: October 26, 1823 Dewittville, New York, U.S.
- Died: March 19, 1881 (aged 57) Carthage, Illinois, U.S.
- Spouse: Sarah Collins (m. 1848)
- Relations: Glenni William Scofield (brother)
- Children: 8

Bryant T. Scofield (October 26, 1823 – March 19, 1881) was a lawyer and politician from Illinois.

== Early life ==
Bryant T. Scofield was born on October 26, 1823, in Dewittville, New York, to Sally (née Glenny) and Darius Scofield. In 1843, Scofield moved to Hancock County, Illinois, and became a teacher. He entered the office of William A. Richardson in Rushville, Illinois, and was admitted to the bar in 1846.

== Career ==
In 1846, Scofield moved to Carthage, Illinois, to start a law practice. Around 1863, Scofield became a lawyer for railroad companies as they merged into the Chicago, Burlington and Quincy Railroad.

In 1862, Scofield was elected to the Illinois Senate. He served for four years.

== Personal life ==
Scofield married Sarah A. Collins, who was of Scottish ancestry, on September 11, 1848. They had eight children: Glenn W., Mrs. J. M. Cromer, Julia L., Ralph E., Edward B., Frank, Charles and Timothy. His brother was Glenni William Scofield.

Scofield died on March 19, 1881, in Carthage.
