= Scholefield =

Scholefield is a surname of Northern English origin. Notable people with the surname include:

- Adam Scholefield (born 1985), English water polo player
- Alan Scholefield (1931–2017), South African writer
- Edward Scholefield (1893–1929), British Royal Air Force officer and test pilot
- Guy Scholefield (1877–1963), New Zealand journalist, historian, archivist, librarian and editor
- James Scholefield (1789–1853), English classical scholar
- James Scholefield (1790–1855), English religious leader and reformer
- Joshua Scholefield (1775–1844), English businessman and politician
- Mark Scholefield (1828–1858), English Victoria Cross recipient
- William Scholefield (1809–1867), English businessman and politician

== See also ==
- Scofield (disambiguation)
- Schofield (disambiguation)
