= Charles H. Ilgenfritz =

Union Army soldier in the American Civil War

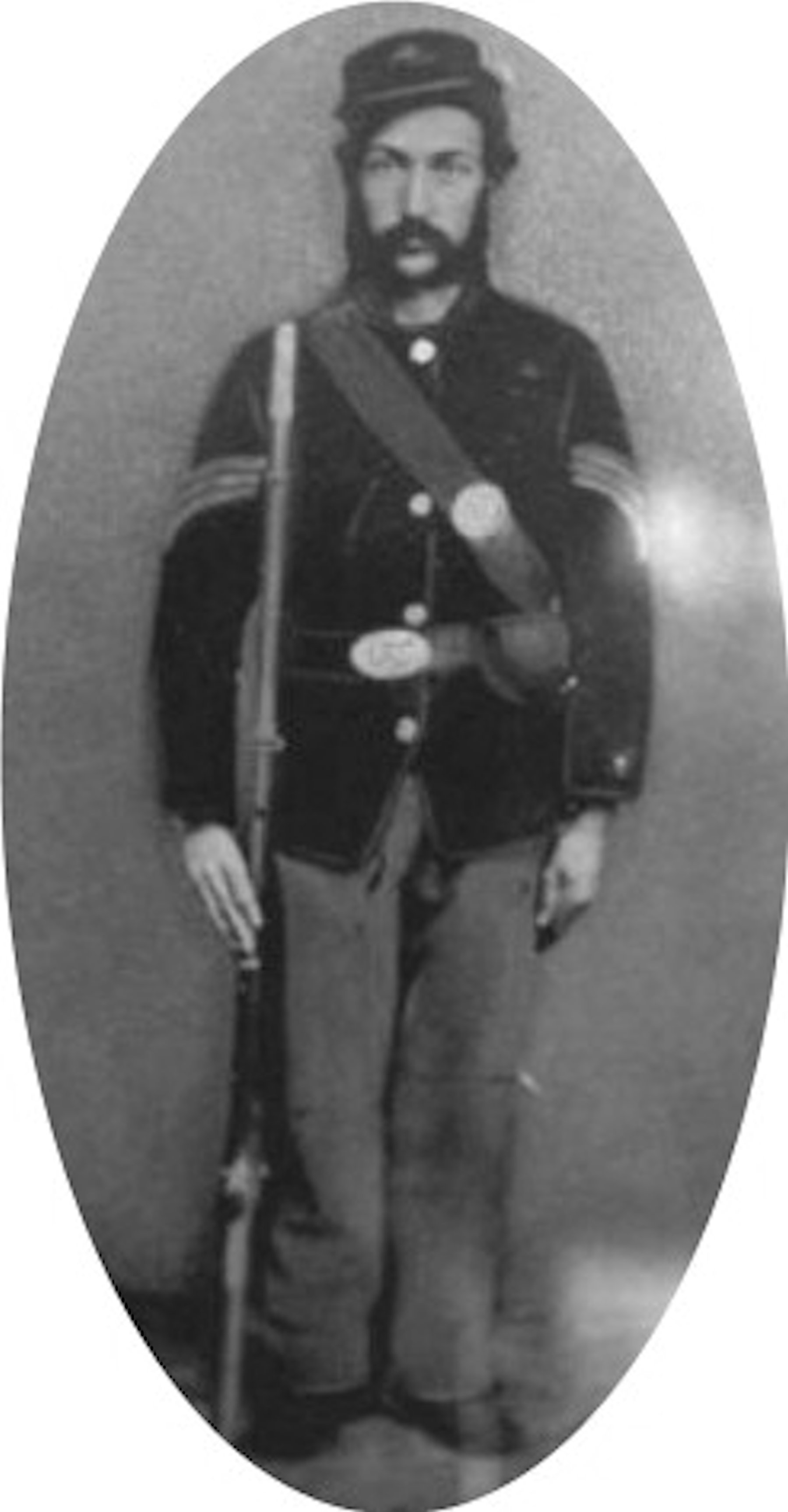
- Born: March 4, 1837; York County, Pennsylvania
- Died: March 31, 1920 (aged 83)
- Burial place: York County, Pennsylvania
- Military career
- Allegiance: United States of America
- Branch: United States Army
- Rank: Sergeant
- Units: Company E, 207th Pennsylvania Infantry Regiment
- Conflicts: American Civil War
- Awards: Medal of Honor

Charles Henry Ilgenfritz (March 4, 1837 – March 31, 1920) was a Union Army soldier in the American Civil War who received the U.S. military's highest decoration, the Medal of Honor.

Ilgenfritz was born in York County, Pennsylvania, on March 4, 1837. He was awarded the Medal of Honor, for extraordinary heroism on April 2, 1865, while serving as a Sergeant with Company E, 207th Pennsylvania Infantry Regiment, at Fort Sedgwick, Virginia. His Medal of Honor was issued on March 20, 1917.

He died at the age of 83, on March 31, 1920, and was buried at the Prospect Hill Cemetery in York County, Pennsylvania.

== Medal of Honor citation ==
The President of the United States of America, in the name of Congress, takes pleasure in presenting the Medal of Honor to Sergeant Charles Henry Ilgenfritz, United States Army, for extraordinary heroism on 2 April 1865, while serving with Company E, 207th Pennsylvania Infantry, in action at Fort Sedgwick, Virginia. The Color Bearer falling, pierced by seven balls, Sergeant Ilgenfritz immediately sprang forward and grasped the colors, planting them upon the enemy's forts amid a murderous fire of grape, canister, and musketry from the enemy.
