= Harold Schofield =

English footballer (1903–1975)

Personal information
- Full name: Harold Schofield
- Date of birth: 25 May 1903
- Place of birth: Manchester, England
- Date of death: 1975 (aged 71–72)
- Position: Full-back

Senior career*
Years	Team	Apps	(Gls)
1925–1929	Bradford (Park Avenue)	17	(0)
1929–1932	Chesterfield	88	(3)
1932–1935	Doncaster Rovers	66	(0)
1935–1936	Queens Park Rangers	0	(0)
1936	Tunbridge Wells Rangers		
Total		171	(3)
- * Club domestic league appearances and goals

Harold Schofield (25 May 1903 – 1975) was an English footballer who played in the Football League for Bradford (Park Avenue), Chesterfield and Doncaster Rovers.
