= Glenni W. Scofield =

American politician (1817–1891)

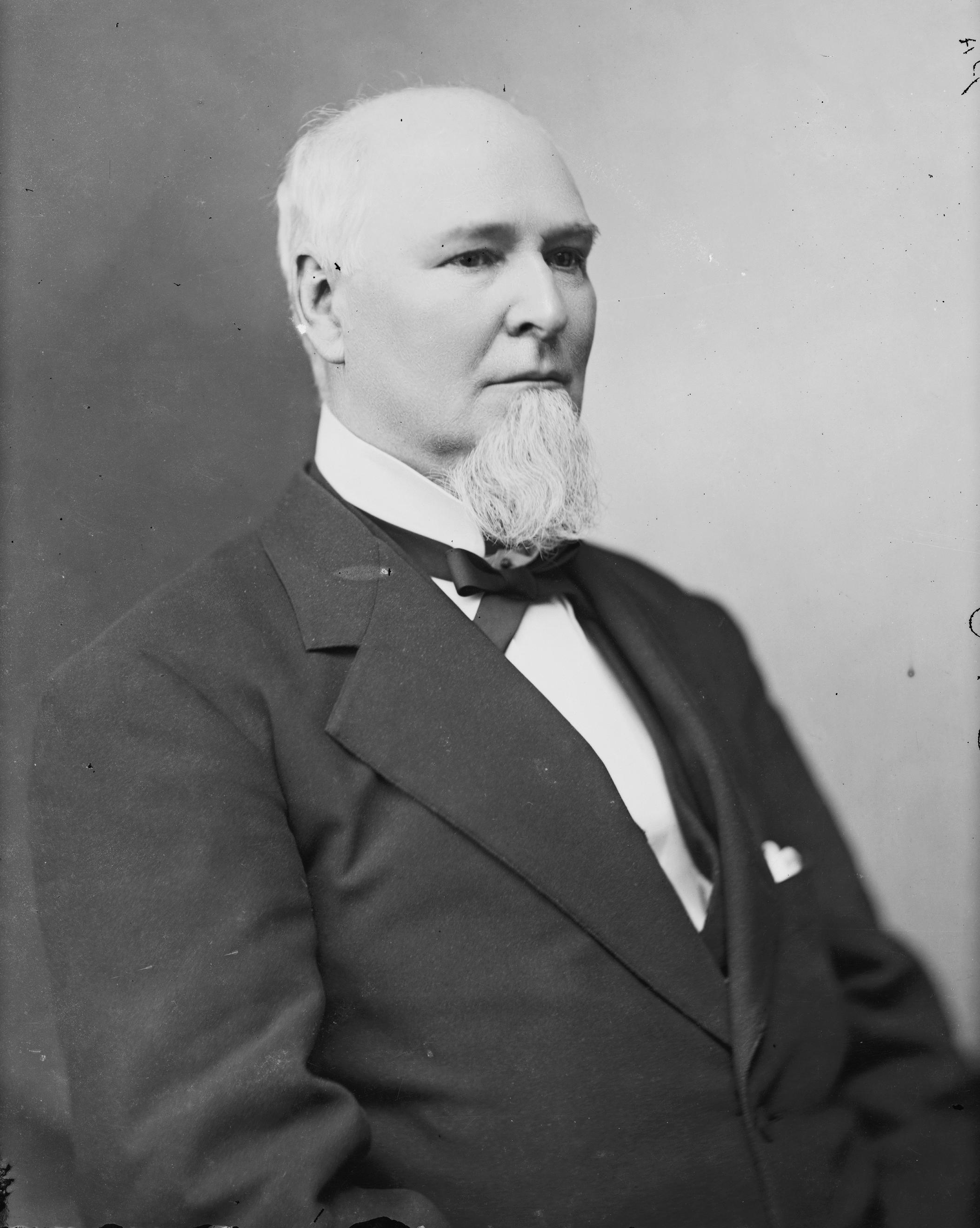
- Scofield, 1865–1880

Judge of the Court of Claims
- In office May 20, 1881 – July 29, 1891
- Appointed by: James A. Garfield
- Preceded by: William H. Hunt
- Succeeded by: Stanton J. Peelle

5th Register of the Treasury
- In office April 1, 1878 – May 20, 1881
- Appointed by: Rutherford B. Hayes
- Preceded by: John Allison
- Succeeded by: Blanche Bruce

Member of the U.S. House of Representatives from Pennsylvania
- In office March 4, 1863 – March 3, 1875
- Preceded by: John Covode (19th); District established (AL)
- Succeeded by: Carlton B. Curtis (19th); District eliminated (AL)
- Constituency: 19th district (1863-73); At-large district (1873-75)

Member of the Pennsylvania State Senate for the 11th district
- In office 1859–1860

Member of the Pennsylvania State Senate for the 19th district
- In office 1857–1858

Member of the Pennsylvania House of Representatives
- In office 1849–1851

Personal details
- Born: Glenni William Scofield; March 11, 1817 Dewittville, New York, U.S.
- Died: August 30, 1891 (aged 74) Warren, Pennsylvania, U.S.
- Resting place: Oakland Cemetery; Warren, Pennsylvania
- Party: Democratic (until 1856); Republican (from 1856)
- Relatives: Bryant T. Scofield (brother)
- Education: Hamilton College read law
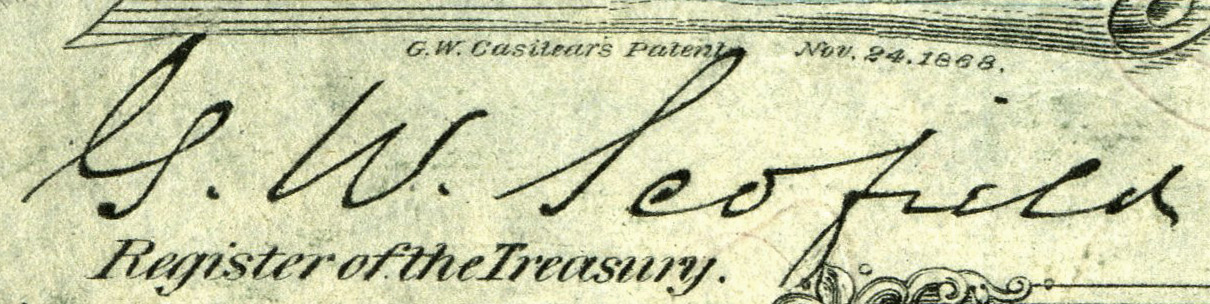
- Signature

Glenni William Scofield (March 11, 1817 – August 30, 1891) was a United States representative from Pennsylvania, Pennsylvania State Representative, Pennsylvania State Senator, Register of the Treasury and a judge of the Court of Claims.

== Education and career ==
Born on March 11, 1817, in Dewittville, Chautauqua County, New York, Scofield attended the common schools and learned the printing trade. He returned to classical study and graduated from Hamilton College in 1840 and read law with Carlton Brandaga Curtis in Warren, Pennsylvania in 1842, briefly engaging in teaching while studying law. He entered private practice in Warren from 1842 to 1846. He was district attorney for Warren County, Pennsylvania from 1846 to 1848. He was a member of the Pennsylvania House of Representatives from 1849 to 1851. He resumed private practice in Warren circa 1851 to circa 1857. He changed his partisan affiliation from anti-slavery Democratic to Republican in 1856. He served in the Pennsylvania State Senate for the 19th district from 1857 to 1858 and for the 11th district from 1859 to 1860. He was President Judge of the Pennsylvania Court of Common Pleas for the Eighteenth Judicial District from 1861 to 1863.

== Congressional service ==
Scofield was elected from Pennsylvania's 19th congressional district and later Pennsylvania's at-large congressional district as a Republican to the United States House of Representatives of the 38th United States Congress and to the five succeeding Congresses, serving from March 4, 1863, to March 3, 1875. He served as Chairman of the United States House Committee on Revisal and Unfinished Business for the 39th United States Congress and Chairman of the United States House Committee on Naval Affairs for the 41st, 42nd and 43rd United States Congresses. He was not a candidate for renomination in 1874.

=== Scandal ===
Scofield was caught up in the scandal involving Congressman Oakes Ames who was censured for selling shares in Credit Mobilier at greatly reduced prices to fellow congressman. Ames had sold shares in Cedar Rapids stock bonds to Scofield and recommended he purchase shares in Credit Mobilier but the contract for the sale was never completed.

== Later career ==
Following his departure from Congress, Scofield returned to private practice in Warren from 1875 to 1878. He was appointed as the Register of the Treasury for the United States Department of the Treasury by President Rutherford B. Hayes, serving from 1878 to 1881.

== Federal judicial service ==
Scofield was nominated by President James A. Garfield on May 19, 1881, to a seat on the Court of Claims (later the United States Court of Claims) vacated by Judge William H. Hunt. He was confirmed by the United States Senate on May 20, 1881, and received his commission the same day. His service terminated on July 29, 1891, due to his resignation.

== Personal life ==
Scofield's brother was Bryant T. Scofield, a politician in Illinois.

Scofield died of a stroke on August 30, 1891, in Warren. He was interred in Oakland Cemetery in Warren.

== Sources ==
- United States Congress. "Glenni W. Scofield (id: S000164)". Biographical Directory of the United States Congress.
- The Political Graveyard Archived 2006-09-02 at the Wayback Machine

Pennsylvania House of Representatives
| Preceded by | Member of the Pennsylvania House of Representatives; 1849–1851 | Succeeded by |
Pennsylvania State Senate
| Preceded by | Member of the Pennsylvania Senate for the 19th district 1857–1858 | Succeeded by Samuel S. Wharton |
| Preceded by George W. Brewer | Member of the Pennsylvania Senate for the 11th district 1859–1860 | Succeeded by Isaac Benson |
U.S. House of Representatives
| Preceded by John Covode | Member of the U.S. House of Representatives from Pennsylvania's 19th congressional district 1863–1873 | Succeeded by Carlton Brandaga Curtis |
| Preceded by District established | Member of the U.S. House of Representatives from Pennsylvania's at-large congressional district 1873–1875 | Succeeded by District abolished |
Political offices
| Preceded by John Allison | Register of the Treasury; 1878–1881 | Succeeded by Blanche Bruce |
Legal offices
| Preceded by William H. Hunt | Judge of the Court of Claims; 1881–1891 | Succeeded by Stanton J. Peelle |
