= Edward D. Ziegler =

American politician (1844–1931)

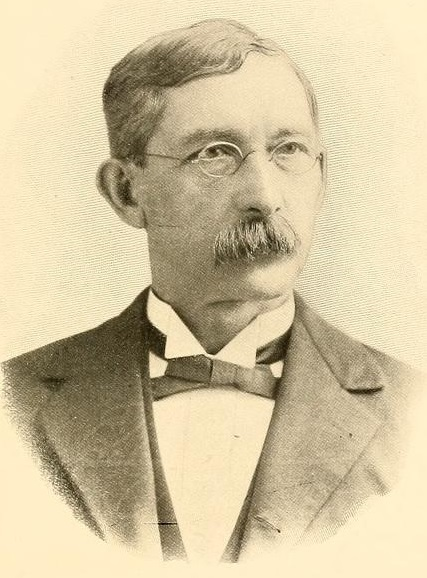
- From 1897's Biographical and Portrait Cyclopedia of the Nineteenth Congressional District, Pennsylvania

Member of the U.S. House of Representatives from Pennsylvania's 19th district
- In office March 4, 1899 – March 3, 1901
- Preceded by: George J. Benner
- Succeeded by: Robert Jacob Lewis

Personal details
- Born: Edward Danner Ziegler; March 3, 1844 Bedford, Pennsylvania, U.S.
- Died: December 21, 1931 (aged 87) York, Pennsylvania, U.S.
- Resting place: Prospect Hill Cemetery, York, Pennsylvania, U.S.
- Party: Democratic
- Education: Pennsylvania College
- Profession: Politician, lawyer

Edward Danner Ziegler (March 3, 1844 – December 21, 1931) was an American politician and lawyer who served a single term in the United States House of Representatives, representing the 19th congressional district of Pennsylvania from 1899 to 1901 as a Democrat in the 56th United States Congress.

== Early life and education ==
Ziegler was born in Bedford, Pennsylvania, on March 3, 1844. He graduated from Pennsylvania College in 1865.

Ziegler was engaged in teaching in the York County Academy. He studied law.

== Career ==
Ziegler was admitted to the bar in 1868; he commenced practice in York, Pennsylvania.

Ziegler served as commissioner's clerk in 1871 and 1872. He also served as counsel to the board of commissioners. Additionally, Ziegler served as district attorney of York County from 1881 to 1883. He was a delegate to the 1884 Democratic National Convention.

Zeigler served a single term in the United States House of Representatives, representing the 19th congressional district of Pennsylvania as a Democrat in the 56th United States Congress. His time in office began on March 4, 1899, and concluded on March 3, 1901. Ziegler was an unsuccessful candidate for renomination in 1900.

Following his tenure in Congress, Ziegler resumed practicing law. He was appointed by the judge of the court of common pleas of York County to be the auditor of the offices of prothonotary, register of wills, clerk of the court, treasurer, and recorder of York County. Ziegler served from 1923 to 1925.

Ziegler continued practicing law in York until his death in 1931.

== Personal life and death ==
Ziegler died at the age of 87 in York on December 21, 1931. He was interred in Prospect Hill Cemetery, located in York.

== See also ==
- List of United States representatives who served a single term

U.S. House of Representatives
Preceded by George J. Benner	Member of the U.S. House of Representatives from Pennsylvania's 19th congressional district 1899–1901	Succeeded by Robert Jacob Lewis
