= Peter Schofield (physicist) =

British physicist

Peter Schofield (London, 14 September 1929 - 15 April 2018) was a British physicist specializing in neutron scattering.

Schofield began his career 1956 in the Theoretical Physics Division of the Atomic Energy Research Establishment at Harwell. A paper from 1962, written with Peter Egelstaff, on the evaluation of the velocity auto-correlation function has become a classic in the field. In 1979, Schofield became chairman of the Neutron Scattering Group of the Institute of Physics. In 1991-94, he served as UK Associate Director of the Institut Laue-Langevin in Grenoble.

Schofield loved classical music. He was an accomplished pianist and accompanist, wrote opera critics magazines, and published a book on The Enjoyment of Opera.
