= Scofield =

Scofield may refer to:

- Scofield (surname), a surname
- Scofield, Michigan, an unincorporated community
- Scofield, Utah, a very small town
  - Scofield Mine disaster, when a coal mine exploded near the town in May 1900
  - Scofield Reservoir, a reservoir near the town
- Scofield Reference Bible, an annotated version of the Bible first published in 1909

== See also ==
- Schofield (disambiguation)
- Scholefield, a surname
