= List of former United States representatives (S) =

This is a complete list of former United States representatives whose last names begin with the letter S.

== Number of years and terms the member has served ==
The number of years the representative/delegate has served in Congress indicates the number of terms the representative/delegate has. Note the representative/delegate can also serve non-consecutive terms if the representative/delegate loses election and wins re-election to the House.

- 2 years – 1 or 2 terms
- 4 years – 2 or 3 terms
- 6 years – 3 or 4 terms
- 8 years – 4 or 5 terms
- 10 years – 5 or 6 terms
- 12 years – 6 or 7 terms
- 14 years – 7 or 8 terms
- 16 years – 8 or 9 terms
- 18 years – 9 or 10 terms
- 20 years – 10 or 11 terms
- 22 years – 11 or 12 terms
- 24 years – 12 or 13 terms
- 26 years – 13 or 14 terms
- 28 years – 14 or 15 terms
- 30 years – 15 or 16 terms
- 32 years – 16 or 17 terms
- 34 years – 17 or 18 terms
- 36 years – 18 or 19 terms
- 38 years – 19 or 20 terms
- 40 years – 20 or 21 terms
- 42 years – 21 or 22 terms
- 44 years – 22 or 23 terms
- 46 years – 23 or 24 terms
- 48 years – 24 or 25 terms
- 50 years – 25 or 26 terms
- 52 years – 26 or 27 terms
- 54 years – 27 or 28 terms
- 56 years – 28 or 29 terms
- 58 years – 29 or 30 terms

Name	Term	State/ Territory	Party	Lifespan
Adolph J. Sabath	1907–1952	Illinois	Democratic	1866–1952
Alvah Sabin	1853–1855	Vermont	Whig	1793–1885
Alvah Sabin	1855–1857	Vermont	Oppositionist	1793–1885
Lorenzo Sabine	1852–1853	Massachusetts	Whig	1803–1877
Gregorio Sablan	2009–2021	Northern Mariana Islands	Independent	1955–present
Gregorio Sablan	2021–2025	Northern Mariana Islands	Democratic	1955–present
Martin Olav Sabo	1979–2007	Minnesota	Democratic-Farmer-Labor	1938–2016
William A. Sackett	1849–1853	New York	Whig	1811–1895
Leon Sacks	1937–1943	Pennsylvania	Democratic	1902–1972
Antoni Sadlak	1947–1959	Connecticut	Republican	1908–1969
Thomas William Sadler	1885–1887	Alabama	Democratic	1831–1896
George G. Sadowski	1933–1939; 1943–1951	Michigan	Democratic	1903–1961
Ebenezer Sage	1809–1815	New York	Democratic–Republican	1755–1834
Russell Sage	1853–1855	New York	Whig	1816–1906
Russell Sage	1855–1857	New York	Oppositionist	1816–1906
Pat Saiki	1987–1991	Hawaii	Republican	1930–2026
Peter Sailly	1805–1807	New York	Democratic–Republican	1754–1826
John Salazar	2005–2011	Colorado	Democratic	1953–present
Bill Sali	2007–2009	Idaho	Republican	1954–present
Joshua S. Salmon	1899–1902	New Jersey	Democratic	1846–1902
Matt Salmon	1995–2001; 2013–2017	Arizona	Republican	1958–present
William C. Salmon	1923–1925	Tennessee	Democratic	1868–1925
Leverett Saltonstall I	1838–1843	Massachusetts	Whig	1783–1845
William J. Samford	1879–1881	Alabama	Democratic	1844–1901
Thomas Sammons	1803–1807; 1809–1813	New York	Democratic–Republican	1762–1838
Samuel C. Sample	1843–1845	Indiana	Whig	1796–1855
Ezekiel S. Sampson	1875–1879	Iowa	Republican	1831–1892
Zabdiel Sampson	1817–1820	Massachusetts	Democratic-Republican	1781–1828
Edmund W. Samuel	1905–1907	Pennsylvania	Republican	1857–1930
Green Berry Samuels	1839–1841	Virginia	Democratic	1806–1859
John C. Sanborn	1947–1951	Idaho	Republican	1885–1968
Loretta Sanchez	1997–2017	California	Democratic	1960–present
Harry Sandager	1939–1941	Rhode Island	Republican	1887–1955
Archie D. Sanders	1917–1933	New York	Republican	1857–1941
Bernie Sanders	1991–2007	Vermont	Independent	1941–present
Everett Sanders	1917–1925	Indiana	Republican	1882–1950
Jared Y. Sanders Jr.	1934–1937; 1941–1943	Louisiana	Democratic	1892–1960
Jared Y. Sanders Sr.	1917–1921	Louisiana	Democratic	1869–1944
Morgan G. Sanders	1921–1939	Texas	Democratic	1878–1956
James T. Sandford	1823–1825	Tennessee	Democratic-Republican	N/A
Thomas Sandford	1803–1807	Kentucky	Democratic-Republican	1762–1808
John M. Sandidge	1855–1859	Louisiana	Democratic	1817–1890
John N. Sandlin	1921–1937	Louisiana	Democratic	1872–1957
Max Sandlin	1997–2005	Texas	Democratic	1952–present
Charles W. Sandman Jr.	1967–1975	New Jersey	Republican	1921–1985
Joshua Sands	1803–1805; 1825–1827	New York	Federalist	1757–1835
John Sanford	1841–1843	New York	Democrat	1803–1857
John Sanford	1889–1893	New York	Republican	1851–1939
John W. A. Sanford	1835	Georgia	Democratic	1798–1870
Jonah Sanford	1830–1831	New York	Democratic	1790–1867
Mark Sanford	1995–2001; 2013–2019	South Carolina	Republican	1960–present
Rollin B. Sanford	1915–1921	New York	Republican	1874–1957
Stephen Sanford	1869–1871	New York	Republican	1826–1913
George Sangmeister	1989–1995	Illinois	Democratic	1931–2007
Michael San Nicolas	2019–2023	Guam	Democratic	1981–present
Alfred E. Santangelo	1957–1963	New York	Democratic	1912–1978
James David Santini	1975–1983	Nevada	Democratic	1937–2015
Rick Santorum	1991–1995	Pennsylvania	Republican	1958–present
George Santos	2023	New York	Republican	1988–present
William Fletcher Sapp	1877–1881	Iowa	Republican	1824–1890
William R. Sapp	1853–1855	Ohio	Whig	1804–1875
William R. Sapp	1855–1857	Ohio	Oppositionist	1804–1875
Ronald A. Sarasin	1973–1979	Connecticut	Republican	1934–2023
George W. Sarbacher Jr.	1947–1949	Pennsylvania	Republican	1919–1973
John Sarbanes	2007–2025	Maryland	Democratic	1962–present
Paul Sarbanes	1971–1977	Maryland	Democratic	1933–2020
Aaron A. Sargent	1861–1863; 1869–1873	California	Republican	1827–1887
Bill Sarpalius	1989–1995	Texas	Democratic	1948–present
Lansdale Ghiselin Sasscer	1939–1953	Maryland	Democratic	1893–1964
Dave E. Satterfield Jr.	1937–1945	Virginia	Democratic	1894–1946
David E. Satterfield III	1965–1981	Virginia	Democratic	1920–1988
Edward Sauerhering	1895–1899	Wisconsin	Republican	1864–1924
Dalip Singh Saund	1957–1963	California	Democratic	1899–1973
Edward W. Saunders	1906–1920	Virginia	Democratic	1860–1921
Romulus M. Saunders	1821–1825	North Carolina	Democratic-Republican	1791–1867
Romulus M. Saunders	1825–1827; 1841–1845	North Carolina	Democratic	1791–1867
Harry Sauthoff	1935–1939; 1941–1945	Wisconsin	Progressive	1879–1966
Charles R. Savage	1945–1947	Washington	Democratic	1906–1976
Gus Savage	1981–1993	Illinois	Democratic	1925–2015
John Savage	1815–1819	New York	Democratic–Republican	1779–1863
John H. Savage	1849–1853; 1855–1859	Tennessee	Democratic	1815–1904
John S. Savage	1875–1877	Ohio	Democratic	1841–1884
Cullen Sawtelle	1845–1847; 1849–1851	Maine	Democratic	1805–1887
Harold S. Sawyer	1977–1985	Michigan	Republican	1920–2003
John G. Sawyer	1885–1889	New York	Republican	1825–1898
Lemuel Sawyer	1807–1813; 1817–1823	North Carolina	Democratic-Republican	1777–1852
Lemuel Sawyer	1825–1829	North Carolina	Democratic	1777–1852
Lewis E. Sawyer	1923	Arkansas	Democratic	1867–1923
Philetus Sawyer	1865–1875	Wisconsin	Republican	1816–1900
Samuel L. Sawyer	1879–1881	Missouri	Independent Democrat	1813–1890
Samuel Tredwell Sawyer	1837–1839	North Carolina	Whig	1800–1865
Tom Sawyer	1987–2003	Ohio	Democratic	1945–2023
William Sawyer	1845–1849	Ohio	Democratic	1803–1877
Jim Saxton	1984–2009	New Jersey	Republican	1943–present
Benjamin Say	1808–1809	Pennsylvania	Democratic-Republican	1755–1813
Joseph D. Sayers	1885–1899	Texas	Democratic	1841–1929
Henry B. Sayler	1873–1875	Indiana	Republican	1836–1900
Milton Sayler	1873–1879	Ohio	Democratic	1831–1892
John P. Saylor	1949–1973	Pennsylvania	Republican	1908–1973
Alfred Moore Scales	1857–1859; 1875–1884	North Carolina	Democratic	1827–1892
John F. Scamman	1845–1847	Maine	Democratic	1786–1858
Thomas E. Scanlon	1941–1945	Pennsylvania	Democratic	1896–1955
Joe Scarborough	1995–2001	Florida	Republican	1963–present
Robert B. Scarborough	1901–1905	South Carolina	Democratic	1861–1927
Henry C. Schadeberg	1961–1965; 1967–1971	Wisconsin	Republican	1913–1985
Daniel Schaefer	1983–1999	Colorado	Republican	1936–2006
Edwin M. Schaefer	1933–1943	Illinois	Democratic	1887–1950
John C. Schafer	1923–1933; 1939–1941	Wisconsin	Republican	1893–1962
Bob Schaffer	1997–2003	Colorado	Republican	1962–present
Thomas D. Schall	1915–1925	Minnesota	Republican	1878–1935
Mark Schauer	2009–2011	Michigan	Democratic	1961–present
Richard Schell	1874–1875	New York	Democratic	1810–1879
Abraham H. Schenck	1815–1817	New York	Democratic-Republican	1775–1831
Ferdinand Schureman Schenck	1833–1837	New Jersey	Democratic	1790–1860
Paul F. Schenck	1951–1965	Ohio	Republican	1899–1968
Robert C. Schenck	1843–1851	Ohio	Whig	1809–1890
Robert C. Schenck	1863–1871	Ohio	Republican	1809–1890
Lynn Schenk	1993–1995	California	Democratic	1945–present
Gordon H. Scherer	1953–1963	Ohio	Republican	1906–1988
William J. Scherle	1967–1975	Iowa	Republican	1923–2003
Abraham M. Schermerhorn	1849–1853	New York	Whig	1791–1855
Simon J. Schermerhorn	1893–1895	New York	Democratic	1827–1901
James H. Scheuer	1965–1973; 1975–1993	New York	Democratic-Liberal	1920–2005
Adam Schiff	2001–2024	California	Democratic	1960–present
Steven Schiff	1989–1998	New Mexico	Republican	1947–1998
A. C. Schiffler	1939–1941; 1943–1945	West Virginia	Republican	1889–1970
Bobby Schilling	2011–2013	Illinois	Republican	1964–2021
Charles Reginald Schirm	1901–1903	Maryland	Republican	1864–1918
Gale Schisler	1965–1967	Illinois	Democratic	1933–2020
Gustav Schleicher	1875–1879	Texas	Democratic	1823–1879
William Schley	1833–1835	Georgia	Democratic	1786–1858
John R. Schmidhauser	1965–1967	Iowa	Democratic	1922–2018
Jean Schmidt	2005–2013	Ohio	Republican	1951–present
John G. Schmitz	1970–1973	California	Republican	1930–2001
Gustav A. Schneebeli	1905–1907	Pennsylvania	Republican	1853–1923
Herman T. Schneebeli	1960–1977	Pennsylvania	Republican	1907–1982
Claudine Schneider	1981–1991	Rhode Island	Republican	1947–present
George J. Schneider	1923–1933	Wisconsin	Republican	1877–1939
George J. Schneider	1935–1939	Wisconsin	Progressive	1877–1939
Aaron Schock	2009–2015	Illinois	Republican	1981–present
John L. Schoolcraft	1849–1853	New York	Whig	1804–1860
Cornelius C. Schoonmaker	1791–1793	New York	Anti–Administration	1745–1796
Marius Schoonmaker	1851–1853	New York	Whig	1811–1894
Kurt Schrader	2009–2023	Oregon	Democratic	1951–present
Ed Schrock	2001–2005	Virginia	Republican	1941–present
Pat Schroeder	1973–1997	Colorado	Democratic	1940–2023
Bill Schuette	1985–1991	Michigan	Republican	1953–present
Leonard W. Schuetz	1931–1944	Illinois	Democratic	1887–1944
William T. Schulte	1933–1943	Indiana	Democratic	1890–1966
Dick Schulze	1975–1993	Pennsylvania	Republican	1929–2025
John G. Schumaker	1869–1871; 1873–1877	New York	Democratic	1826–1905
Chuck Schumer	1981–1999	New York	Democratic	1950–present
Martin G. Schuneman	1805–1807	New York	Democratic–Republican	1764–1827
James Schureman	1789–1791	New Jersey	Pro-Administration	1756–1824
James Schureman	1797–1799; 1813–1815	New Jersey	Federalist	1756–1824
Philip Jeremiah Schuyler	1817–1819	New York	Federalist	1768–1835
George B. Schwabe	1945–1949; 1951–1952	Oklahoma	Republican	1886–1952
Max Schwabe	1943–1949	Missouri	Republican	1905–1983
Allyson Schwartz	2005–2015	Pennsylvania	Democratic	1948–present
John Schwartz	1859–1860	Pennsylvania	Anti-Lecompton Democratic	1793–1860
Joe Schwarz	2005–2007	Michigan	Republican	1937–2026
Richard Schweiker	1961–1969	Pennsylvania	Republican	1926–2015
Fred Schwengel	1955–1965; 1967–1973	Iowa	Republican	1906–1993
Pius Schwert	1939–1941	New York	Democratic	1892–1941
James P. Scoblick	1946–1949	Pennsylvania	Republican	1909–1981
Glenni W. Scofield	1863–1875	Pennsylvania	Republican	1817–1891
Byron N. Scott	1935–1939	California	Democratic	1903–1991
Charles Frederick Scott	1901–1911	Kansas	Republican	1860–1938
Charles L. Scott	1857–1861	California	Democratic	1827–1899
David Scott	2003–2026	Georgia	Democratic	1945–2026
Frank D. Scott	1915–1927	Michigan	Republican	1878–1951
George Cromwell Scott	1912–1915; 1917–1919	Iowa	Republican	1864–1948
Hardie Scott	1947–1953	Pennsylvania	Republican	1907–1999
Harvey D. Scott	1855–1857	Indiana	Oppositionist	1818–1891
Hugh Scott	1941–1945; 1947–1959	Pennsylvania	Republican	1900–1994
John Scott	1816–1817; 1817–1821; 1821–1825	Missouri	Democratic-Republican	1785–1861
John Scott	1825–1827	Missouri	National Republican	1785–1861
John Scott	1829–1831	Pennsylvania	Democratic	1784–1850
John G. Scott	1863–1865	Missouri	Democratic	1819–1892
John R. K. Scott	1915–1919	Pennsylvania	Republican	1873–1945
Lon A. Scott	1921–1923	Tennessee	Republican	1888–1931
Owen Scott	1891–1893	Illinois	Democratic	1848–1928
Ralph James Scott	1957–1967	North Carolina	Democratic	1905–1983
Thomas Scott	1789–1791; 1793–1795	Pennsylvania	Pro-Administration	1739–1796
Tim Scott	2009–2013	South Carolina	Republican	1965–present
William Lawrence Scott	1885–1889	Pennsylvania	Democratic	1828–1891
William L. Scott	1967–1973	Virginia	Republican	1915–1997
Jonathan Scoville	1880–1883	New York	Democratic	1830–1891
George W. Scranton	1859–1861	Pennsylvania	Republican	1811–1861
Joseph A. Scranton	1881–1883; 1885–1887; 1889–1891; 1893–1897	Pennsylvania	Republican	1838–1908
William Scranton	1961–1963	Pennsylvania	Republican	1917–2013
Errett P. Scrivner	1943–1959	Kansas	Republican	1898–1978
Thomas E. Scroggy	1905–1907	Ohio	Republican	1843–1915
James G. Scrugham	1933–1942	Nevada	Democratic	1880–1945
Henry J. Scudder	1873–1875	New York	Republican	1825–1886
Hubert B. Scudder	1949–1959	California	Republican	1888–1968
Isaac W. Scudder	1873–1875	New Jersey	Republican	1816–1881
John A. Scudder	1810–1811	New Jersey	Democratic-Republican	1759–1836
Townsend Scudder	1899–1901; 1903–1905	New York	Democratic	1865–1960
Tredwell Scudder	1817–1819	New York	Democratic-Republican	1778–1834
Zeno Scudder	1851–1854	Massachusetts	Whig	1807–1857
Edward Scull	1887–1893	Pennsylvania	Republican	1818–1900
Thomas J. Scully	1911–1921	New Jersey	Democratic	1868–1921
Richardson A. Scurry	1851–1853	Texas	Democratic	1811–1862
Henry J. Seaman	1845–1847	New York	American	1805–1861
John A. Searing	1857–1859	New York	Democratic	1805–1876
William J. Sears	1915–1929; 1933–1937	Florida	Democratic	1874–1944
Willis G. Sears	1923–1931	Nebraska	Republican	1860–1949
Andrea Seastrand	1995–1997	California	Republican	1941–present
Ebenezer Seaver	1803–1813	Massachusetts	Democratic-Republican	1763–1844
Keith Sebelius	1969–1981	Kansas	Republican	1916–1982
James Seccombe	1939–1941	Ohio	Republican	1893–1970
Robert T. Secrest	1933–1942; 1949–1954; 1963–1967	Ohio	Democratic	1904–1994
James Seddon	1845–1847; 1849–1851	Virginia	Democratic	1815–1880
Charles B. Sedgwick	1859–1863	New York	New Pro-Administration	1815–1883
Theodore Sedgwick	1789–1795	Massachusetts	Pro-Administration	1746–1813
Theodore Sedgwick	1795–1796; 1799–1801	Massachusetts	Federalist	1746–1813
John E. Seeley	1871–1873	New York	Republican	1810–1875
Horace Seely-Brown Jr.	1947–1949; 1951–1959; 1961–1963	Connecticut	Republican	1908–1982
Julius Hawley Seelye	1875–1877	Massachusetts	Independent	1824–1895
John J. Seerley	1891–1893	Iowa	Democratic	1852–1931
Joseph Segar	1862–1863	Virginia	Unionist	1804–1880
George N. Seger	1923–1940	New Jersey	Republican	1866–1940
Francis Seiberling	1929–1933	Ohio	Republican	1870–1945
John F. Seiberling	1971–1987	Ohio	Democratic	1918–2008
Shelley Sekula-Gibbs	2006–2007	Texas	Republican	1953–present
Thomas J. Selby	1901–1903	Illinois	Democratic	1840–1917
Armistead I. Selden Jr.	1953–1969	Alabama	Democratic	1921–1985
Dudley Selden	1833–1834	New York	Democratic	1794–1855
Harry H. Seldomridge	1913–1915	Colorado	Democratic	1864–1927
Sam R. Sells	1911–1921	Tennessee	Republican	1871–1935
Conrad Selvig	1927–1933	Minnesota	Republican	1877–1953
Lewis Selye	1867–1869	New York	Republican	1803–1883
Benedict Joseph Semmes	1829–1833	Maryland	National Republican	1789–1863
Joe Sempolinski	2022–2023	New York	Republican	1983–present
James Beverley Sener	1873–1875	Virginia	Republican	1837–1903
George E. Seney	1883–1891	Ohio	Anti-Administration	1832–1905
Joshua Seney	1789–1792	Maryland	Anti-Administration	1756–1798
George F. Senner Jr.	1963–1967	Arizona	Democratic	1921–2007
Jim Sensenbrenner	1979–2021	Wisconsin	Republican	1943–present
William Tandy Senter	1843–1845	Tennessee	Whig	1801–1848
John Sergeant	1815–1823	Pennsylvania	Federalist	1779–1852
John Sergeant	1827–1829	Pennsylvania	National Republican	1779–1852
John Sergeant	1837–1841	Pennsylvania	Whig	1779–1852
José E. Serrano	1990–2021	New York	Democratic	1943–present
Gustavus Sessinghaus	1883	Missouri	Republican	1838–1887
Walter L. Sessions	1871–1875; 1885–1887	New York	Republican	1820–1896
Joe Sestak	2007–2011	Pennsylvania	Democratic	1951–present
Evan E. Settle	1897–1899	Kentucky	Democratic	1848–1899
Thomas Settle	1817–1821	North Carolina	Democratic-Republican	1789–1857
Thomas Settle	1893–1897	North Carolina	Republican	1865–1919
Luther Severance	1843–1847	Maine	Whig	1797–1855
Ambrose H. Sevier	1828–1836	Arkansas	None	1801–1848
John Sevier	1790–1791	North Carolina	Pro-Administration	1745–1815
John Sevier	1811–1815	Tennessee	Democratic-Republican	1745–1815
Charles S. Sewall	1832–1833; 1843	Maryland	Democratic	1779–1848
Samuel Sewall	1796–1800	Massachusetts	Federalist	1757–1814
James Lindsay Seward	1853–1859	Georgia	Democratic	1813–1886
Leonidas Sexton	1877–1879	Indiana	Republican	1827–1880
Adam Seybert	1809–1815; 1817–1819	Pennsylvania	Democratic-Republican	1773–1825
David L. Seymour	1843–1845; 1851–1853	New York	Democratic	1803–1867
Edward W. Seymour	1883–1887	Connecticut	Democratic	1832–1892
Henry W. Seymour	1888–1889	Michigan	Republican	1834–1906
Origen S. Seymour	1851–1855	Connecticut	Democratic	1804–1881
Thomas H. Seymour	1843–1845	Connecticut	Democratic	1807–1868
William Seymour	1835–1837	New York	Democratic	1775–1848
John W. Shackelford	1881–1883	North Carolina	Democratic	1844–1883
Dorsey W. Shackleford	1899–1919	Missouri	Democratic	1853–1936
John Shadegg	1995–2011	Arizona	Republican	1949–present
Jacob K. Shafer	1869–1871	Idaho	Democratic	1823–1876
Paul W. Shafer	1937–1954	Michigan	Republican	1893–1954
Joseph Crockett Shaffer	1929–1931	Virginia	Republican	1880–1958
John F. Shafroth	1895–1897	Colorado	Republican	1854–1922
John F. Shafroth	1897–1903	Colorado	Silver Republican	1854–1922
John F. Shafroth	1903–1904	Colorado	Democratic	1854–1922
Donna Shalala	2019–2021	Florida	Democratic	1941–present
Ashton C. Shallenberger	1901–1903; 1915–1919; 1923–1929; 1931–1935	Nebraska	Democratic	1862–1938
William S. Shallenberger	1877–1883	Pennsylvania	Republican	1839–1914
Bob Shamansky	1981–1983	Ohio	Democratic	1927–2011
George S. Shanklin	1865–1867	Kentucky	Democratic	1807–1883
John P. C. Shanks	1861–1863; 1867–1875	Indiana	Republican	1826–1901
James A. Shanley	1935–1943	Connecticut	Democratic	1896–1965
James Shannon	1979–1985	Massachusetts	Democratic	1952–present
Joe Shannon	1931–1943	Missouri	Democratic	1867–1943
Richard C. Shannon	1895–1899	New York	Republican	1839–1920
Thomas Shannon	1826–1827	Ohio	Democratic-Republican	1786–1843
Thomas Bowles Shannon	1863–1865	California	Republican	1827–1897
Wilson Shannon	1853–1855	Ohio	Democratic	1802–1877
Edgar A. Sharp	1945–1947	New York	Republican	1876–1948
Philip Sharp	1975–1995	Indiana	Democratic	1942–present
Solomon P. Sharp	1813–1817	Kentucky	Democratic-Republican	1787–1825
William G. Sharp	1909–1914	Ohio	Democratic	1859–1922
Peter Sharpe	1823–1825	New York	Democratic-Republican	1777–1842
Cassius M. Shartel	1905–1907	Missouri	Republican	1860–1943
William B. Shattuc	1897–1903	Ohio	Republican	1841–1911
Aaron Shaw	1857–1859; 1883–1885	Illinois	Democratic	1811–1887
Albert D. Shaw	1900–1901	New York	Republican	1841–1901
Clay Shaw	1981–2007	Florida	Republican	1939–2013
Frank T. Shaw	1885–1889	Maryland	Democratic	1841–1923
George B. Shaw	1893–1894	Wisconsin	Republican	1854–1894
Guy L. Shaw	1921–1923	Illinois	Republican	1881–1950
Henry Shaw	1817–1821	Massachusetts	Democratic-Republican	1788–1857
Henry M. Shaw	1853–1855; 1857–1859	North Carolina	Democratic	1819–1864
John G. Shaw	1895–1897	North Carolina	Democratic	1859–1932
Samuel Shaw	1808–1813	Vermont	Democratic-Republican	1768–1827
Tristram Shaw	1839–1843	New Hampshire	Democratic	1786–1843
Chris Shays	1987–2009	Connecticut	Republican	1945–present
Carol Shea-Porter	2007–2011; 2013–2015; 2017–2019	New Hampshire	Democratic	1952–present
James Sheafe	1799–1801	New Hampshire	Federalist	1755–1829
James Sheakley	1875–1877	Pennsylvania	Democratic	1829–1917
Charles Christopher Sheats	1873–1875	Alabama	Republican	1839–1904
Timothy P. Sheehan	1951–1959	Illinois	Republican	1909–2000
Daniel Sheffer	1837–1839	Pennsylvania	Democratic	1783–1880
Daniel Sheffey	1809–1817	Virginia	Federalist	1770–1830
William Paine Sheffield Sr.	1861–1863	Rhode Island	Unionist	1820–1907
William Paine Sheffield Jr.	1909–1911	Rhode Island	Republican	1857–1919
Richard Shelby	1979–1987	Alabama	Democratic	1934–present
Carlos D. Shelden	1897–1903	Michigan	Republican	1840–1904
Lionel Allen Sheldon	1869–1875	Louisiana	Republican	1828–1917
Porter Sheldon	1869–1871	New York	Republican	1831–1908
George W. Shell	1891–1895	South Carolina	Democratic	1831–1899
Samuel Shellabarger	1861–1863; 1865–1869; 1871–1873	Ohio	Republican	1817–1896
Charles M. Shelley	1877–1881; 1882–1885	Alabama	Democratic	1833–1907
John F. Shelley	1949–1964	California	Democratic	1905–1974
Samuel A. Shelton	1921–1923	Missouri	Republican	1858–1948
Charles Biddle Shepard	1837–1839	North Carolina	Whig	1808–1843
Charles Biddle Shepard	1839–1841	North Carolina	Democratic	1808–1843
William Shepard	1797–1803	Massachusetts	Federalist	1737–1817
William Biddle Shepard	1829–1837	North Carolina	National Republican	1799–1852
Karen Shepherd	1993–1995	Utah	Democratic	1940–present
Matthias Shepler	1837–1839	Ohio	Democratic	1790–1863
Harry R. Sheppard	1937–1965	California	Democratic	1885–1969
John L. Sheppard	1899–1902	Texas	Democratic	1852–1902
Morris Sheppard	1902–1913	Texas	Democratic	1875–1941
Augustine Henry Shepperd	1827–1833	North Carolina	Democratic	1792–1864
Augustine Henry Shepperd	1833–1837	North Carolina	National Republican	1792–1864
Augustine Henry Shepperd	1837–1839; 1841–1843; 1847–1851	North Carolina	Whig	1792–1864
John S. Sherburne	1793–1795	New Hampshire	Anti-Administration	1757–1830
John S. Sherburne	1795–1797	New Hampshire	Democratic-Republican	1757–1830
Upton Sheredine	1791–1793	Maryland	Anti-Administration	1740–1800
George A. Sheridan	1873–1875	Louisiana	Liberal Republican	1840–1896
John E. Sheridan	1939–1947	Pennsylvania	Democratic	1902–1987
Mikie Sherrill	2019–2025	New Jersey	Democratic	1972–present
J. Swagar Sherley	1903–1919	Kentucky	Democratic	1871–1941
James S. Sherman	1887–1891; 1893–1909	New York	Republican	1855–1912
John Sherman	1855–1861	Ohio	Republican	1823–1900
Judson W. Sherman	1857–1859	New York	Republican	1808–1881
Roger Sherman	1789–1791	Connecticut	Pro-Administration	1721–1793
Socrates N. Sherman	1861–1863	New York	Republican	1801–1873
Eliakim Sherrill	1847–1849	New York	Whig	1813–1863
William Crawford Sherrod	1869–1871	Alabama	Democratic	1835–1919
John C. Sherwin	1879–1883	Illinois	Republican	1838–1904
Don Sherwood	1999–2007	Pennsylvania	Republican	1941–present
Henry Sherwood	1871–1873	Pennsylvania	Democratic	1813–1896
Isaac R. Sherwood	1873–1875	Ohio	Republican	1835–1925
Isaac R. Sherwood	1907–1921	Ohio	Democratic	1835–1925
Isaac R. Sherwood	1923–1925	Ohio	Republican	1835–1925
Samuel Sherwood	1813–1815	New York	Federalist	1779–1862
Samuel B. Sherwood	1817–1819	Connecticut	Federalist	1767–1833
George K. Shiel	1861–1863	Oregon	Democratic	1825–1893
Benjamin G. Shields	1841–1843	Alabama	Democratic	1811–1892
Ebenezer J. Shields	1835–1837	Tennessee	National Republican	1778–1846
Ebenezer J. Shields	1837–1839	Tennessee	Whig	1778–1846
James Shields	1829–1831	Ohio	Democratic	1762–1831
John Shimkus	1997–2021	Illinois	Republican	1958–present
William Norton Shinn	1833–1837	New Jersey	Democratic	1782–1871
Zebulon R. Shipherd	1813–1815	New York	Federalist	1768–1841
George E. Shipley	1959–1979	Illinois	Democratic	1927–2003
George Shiras III	1903–1905	Pennsylvania	Independent Republican	1859–1942
Benjamin F. Shively	1884–1885	Indiana	Anti-Monopolist	1857–1916
Benjamin F. Shively	1887–1893	Indiana	Democratic	1857–1916
Francis Edwin Shober	1869–1873	North Carolina	Democratic	1831–1896
Francis Emanuel Shober	1903–1905	New York	Democratic	1860–1919
Francis Shoemaker	1933–1935	Minnesota	Farmer-Labor	1889–1958
Lazarus D. Shoemaker	1871–1875	Pennsylvania	Republican	1819–1893
George W. Shonk	1891–1893	Pennsylvania	Republican	1850–1900
Dewey Short	1929–1931; 1935–1957	Missouri	Republican	1898–1979
Don L. Short	1959–1965	North Dakota	Republican	1903–1982
Eli S. Shorter	1855–1859	Alabama	Democratic	1823–1879
Hugh Ike Shott	1929–1933	West Virginia	Republican	1866–1953
Richard G. Shoup	1971–1975	Montana	Republican	1923–1995
Jouett Shouse	1915–1919	Kansas	Democratic	1879–1968
Joseph B. Showalter	1897–1903	Pennsylvania	Republican	1851–1932
Jacob Shower	1853–1855	Maryland	Democratic	1803–1879
Ronnie Shows	1999–2003	Mississippi	Democratic	1947–present
Milton W. Shreve	1913–1915; 1919–1921	Pennsylvania	Republican	1858–1939
Milton W. Shreve	1921–1923	Pennsylvania	Independent Republican	1858–1939
Milton W. Shreve	1923–1933	Pennsylvania	Republican	1858–1939
Garner E. Shriver	1961–1977	Kansas	Republican	1912–1998
Alonzo C. Shuford	1895–1899	North Carolina	Populist	1858–1933
George A. Shuford	1953–1959	North Carolina	Democratic	1895–1962
Heath Shuler	2007–2013	North Carolina	Democratic	1971–present
Joseph H. Shull	1903–1905	Pennsylvania	Democratic	1848–1944
Emanuel Shultz	1881–1883	Ohio	Republican	1819–1912
Norman D. Shumway	1979–1991	California	Republican	1934–2022
Bill Shuster	2001–2019	Pennsylvania	Republican	1961–present
Bud Shuster	1973–2001	Pennsylvania	Republican	1932–2023
Abner W. Sibal	1961–1965	Connecticut	Republican	1921–2000
Henry Hastings Sibley	1848–1849; 1849–1853	Wisconsin; Minnesota	None	1811–1891
Jonas Sibley	1823–1825	Massachusetts	Democratic-Republican	1762–1834
Joseph C. Sibley	1893–1895; 1899–1901	Pennsylvania	Democratic	1850–1926
Joseph C. Sibley	1901–1907	Pennsylvania	Republican	1850–1926
Mark H. Sibley	1837–1839	New York	Whig	1796–1852
Solomon Sibley	1820–1823	Michigan	None	1769–1846
Carlton R. Sickles	1963–1967	Maryland	Democratic	1921–2004
Daniel Sickles	1857–1861; 1893–1895	New York	Democratic	1819–1914
Nicholas Sickles	1835–1837	New York	Democratic	1801–1845
Isaac Siegel	1915–1923	New York	Republican	1880–1947
Alfred Dennis Sieminski	1951–1959	New Jersey	Democratic	1911–1990
Bob Sikes	1941–1944; 1945–1979	Florida	Democratic	1906–1994
Gerry Sikorski	1983–1993	Minnesota	Democratic-Farmer-Labor	1948–present
Eugene Siler	1955–1965	Kentucky	Republican	1900–1987
Mark D. Siljander	1981–1987	Michigan	Republican	1951–present
Thomas Hale Sill	1826–1827; 1829–1831	Pennsylvania	National Republican	1783–1856
Nathaniel Silsbee	1817–1821	Massachusetts	Democratic-Republican	1773–1850
Peter Silvester	1789–1793	New York	Pro-Administration	1734–1808
Peter H. Silvester	1847–1851	New York	Whig	1807–1882
Eldred Simkins	1818–1821	South Carolina	Democratic-Republican	1779–1831
F. M. Simmons	1887–1889	North Carolina	Democratic	1854–1940
George A. Simmons	1853–1857	New York	Whig	1791–1857
James S. Simmons	1909–1913	New York	Republican	1861–1935
Rob Simmons	2001–2007	Connecticut	Republican	1943–present
Robert G. Simmons	1923–1933	Nebraska	Republican	1891–1969
Albert G. Simms	1929–1931	New Mexico	Republican	1882–1964
William E. Simms	1859–1861	Kentucky	Democratic	1822–1898
Paul Simon	1975–1985	Illinois	Democratic	1928–2003
William E. Simonds	1889–1891	Connecticut	Republican	1842–1903
Samuel Simons	1843–1845	Connecticut	Democratic	1792–1847
Charles B. Simonton	1879–1883	Tennessee	Democratic	1838–1911
William Simonton	1839–1843	Pennsylvania	Whig	1788–1846
John Simpkins	1895–1898	Massachusetts	Republican	1862–1898
Edna O. Simpson	1959–1961	Illinois	Republican	1891–1984
James Simpson Jr.	1933–1935	Illinois	Republican	1905–1960
Jerry Simpson	1891–1895; 1897–1899	Kansas	Populist	1842–1905
Kenneth F. Simpson	1941	New York	Republican	1895–1941
Richard F. Simpson	1843–1849	South Carolina	Democratic	1798–1882
Richard M. Simpson	1937–1960	Pennsylvania	Republican	1900–1960
Sid Simpson	1943–1958	Illinois	Republican	1894–1958
Alexander D. Sims	1845–1848	South Carolina	Democratic	1803–1848
Hugo S. Sims Jr.	1949–1951	South Carolina	Democratic	1921–2004
Leonard H. Sims	1845–1847	Missouri	Democratic	1807–1886
Thetus W. Sims	1897–1921	Tennessee	Democratic	1852–1939
James H. Sinclair	1919–1935	North Dakota	Republican	1871–1943
Kyrsten Sinema	2013–2019	Arizona	Democratic	1976–present
Theodore Frelinghuysen Singiser	1883–1885	Idaho	Republican	1845–1907
James W. Singleton	1879–1883	Illinois	Democratic	1811–1892
Otho R. Singleton	1853–1855; 1857–1861; 1875–1887	Mississippi	Democratic	1814–1889
Thomas D. Singleton	1833	South Carolina	Nullifier	????-1833
Clement Hall Sinnickson	1875–1879	New Jersey	Republican	1834–1919
Thomas Sinnickson	1789–1791	New Jersey	Pro-Administration	1744–1817
Thomas Sinnickson	1797–1799	New Jersey	Federalist	1744–1817
Thomas Sinnickson	1828–1829	New Jersey	National Republican	1786–1873
Nicholas J. Sinnott	1913–1928	Oregon	Republican	1870–1929
William A. Sipe	1892–1895	Pennsylvania	Democratic	1844–1935
Albio Sires	2006–2023	New Jersey	Democratic	1951–present
William I. Sirovich	1927–1939	New York	Democratic	1882–1939
Norman Sisisky	1983–2001	Virginia	Democratic	1927–2001
B. F. Sisk	1955–1979	California	Democratic	1910–1995
Fred Sisson	1933–1937	New York	Democratic	1879–1949
Thomas U. Sisson	1909–1923	Mississippi	Democratic	1869–1923
Frank C. Sites	1923–1925	Pennsylvania	Democratic	1864–1935
Charles Sitgreaves	1865–1869	New Jersey	Democratic	1803–1878
Samuel Sitgreaves	1795–1798	Pennsylvania	Federalist	1764–1827
Edward L. Sittler Jr.	1951–1953	Pennsylvania	Republican	1908–1978
David Skaggs	1987–1999	Colorado	Democratic	1943–present
Joe Skeen	1981–2003	New Mexico	Republican	1927–2003
Charles Skelton	1851–1855	New Jersey	Democratic	1806–1879
Ike Skelton	1977–2011	Missouri	Democratic	1931–2013
William W. Skiles	1901–1904	Ohio	Republican	1849–1904
Charles R. Skinner	1881–1885	New York	Republican	1844–1928
Harry Skinner	1895–1899	North Carolina	Populist	1855–1929
Richard Skinner	1813–1815	Vermont	Democratic-Republican	1778–1833
Thomas Gregory Skinner	1883–1887; 1889–1891	North Carolina	Democratic	1842–1907
Thomson J. Skinner	1797–1799; 1803–1804	Massachusetts	Democratic-Republican	1752–1809
Joe Skubitz	1963–1978	Kansas	Republican	1906–2000
John M. Slack Jr.	1959–1980	West Virginia	Democratic	1915–1980
Charles Slade	1833–1834	Illinois	Democratic	c. 1797–1834
William Slade	1831–1837	Vermont	Anti-Masonic	1786–1859
William Slade	1837–1843	Vermont	Whig	1786–1859
James H. Slater	1871–1873	Oregon	Democratic	1826–1899
Jim Slattery	1983–1995	Kansas	Democratic	1948–present
D. French Slaughter Jr.	1985–1991	Virginia	Republican	1925–1998
Louise Slaughter	1987–2018	New York	Democratic	1929–2018
Roger C. Slaughter	1943–1947	Missouri	Democratic	1905–1974
James Luther Slayden	1897–1919	Texas	Democratic	1853–1924
Amos Slaymaker	1814–1815	Pennsylvania	Federalist	1755–1837
William F. Slemons	1875–1881	Arkansas	Democratic	1830–1918
C. Bascom Slemp	1907–1923	Virginia	Republican	1870–1943
Campbell Slemp	1903–1907	Virginia	Republican	1839–1907
John Slidell	1843–1845	Louisiana	Democratic	1793–1871
John I. Slingerland	1847–1849	New York	Whig	1804–1861
A. Scott Sloan	1861–1863	Wisconsin	Republican	1820–1895
Andrew Sloan	1874–1875	Georgia	Republican	1845–1883
Charles H. Sloan	1911–1919; 1929–1931	Nebraska	Republican	1863–1946
Ithamar Sloan	1863–1867	Wisconsin	Republican	1822–1898
James Sloan	1803–1809	New Jersey	Democratic-Republican	????-1811
John Sloane	1819–1823	Ohio	Democratic-Republican	1779–1856
John Sloane	1823–1829	Ohio	National Republican	1779–1856
Jonathan Sloane	1833–1837	Ohio	Anti-Masonic	1785–1854
Henry Warner Slocum	1869–1873; 1883–1885	New York	Democratic	1827–1894
Jesse Slocumb	1817–1820	North Carolina	Federalist	1780–1820
Joseph Humphrey Sloss	1871–1875	Alabama	Democratic	1826–1911
Elissa Slotkin	2019–2025	Michigan	Democratic	1976–present
Frank Small Jr.	1953–1955	Maryland	Republican	1896–1973
John Humphrey Small	1899–1921	North Carolina	Democratic	1858–1946
William B. Small	1873–1875	New Hampshire	Republican	1817–1878
Robert Smalls	1875–1879; 1882–1883; 1884–1887	South Carolina	Republican	1839–1915
Ephraim K. Smart	1847–1849; 1851–1853	Maine	Democratic	1813–1872
James S. Smart	1873–1875	New York	Republican	1842–1903
George Smathers	1947–1951	Florida	Democratic	1913–2007
Dennis Smelt	1806–1811	Georgia	Democratic-Republican	1763–1818
John Smilie	1799–1812	Pennsylvania	Anti-Administration	1741–1812
A. Herr Smith	1873–1885	Pennsylvania	Republican	1815–1894
Addison T. Smith	1913–1933	Idaho	Republican	1862–1956
Albert Smith	1839–1841	Maine	Democratic	1793–1867
Albert Smith	1843–1847	New York	Whig	1805–1870
Albert L. Smith Jr.	1981–1983	Alabama	Republican	1931–1997
Arthur Smith	1821–1825	Virginia	Democratic-Republican	1785–1853
Ballard Smith	1815–1821	Virginia	Democratic-Republican	N/A
Bernard Smith	1819–1821	New Jersey	Democratic-Republican	1776–1835
Bob Smith	1985–1990	New Hampshire	Republican	1941–present
Caleb Blood Smith	1843–1849	Indiana	Whig	1808–1864
Charles Bennett Smith	1911–1919	New York	Democratic	1870–1939
Charles Brooks Smith	1890–1891	West Virginia	Republican	1844–1899
Clyde H. Smith	1937–1940	Maine	Republican	1876–1940
David Highbaugh Smith	1897–1907	Kentucky	Democratic	1854–1928
Denny Smith	1981–1991	Oregon	Republican	1938–present
Dietrich C. Smith	1881–1883	Illinois	Republican	1840–1914
Edward H. Smith	1861–1863	New York	Democratic	1809–1885
Francis Ormand Jonathan Smith	1833–1839	Maine	Democratic	1806–1876
Francis R. Smith	1941–1943	Pennsylvania	Democratic	1911–1982
Frank Ellis Smith	1951–1962	Mississippi	Democratic	1918–1997
Frank L. Smith	1919–1921	Illinois	Republican	1867–1950
Frank Owens Smith	1913–1915	Maryland	Democratic	1859–1924
Frederick Cleveland Smith	1939–1951	Ohio	Republican	1884–1956
George Smith	1809–1813	Pennsylvania	Democratic-Republican	N/A
George J. Smith	1903–1905	New York	Republican	1859–1913
George Luke Smith	1873–1875	Louisiana	Republican	1837–1884
George Ross Smith	1913–1917	Minnesota	Republican	1864–1952
George W. Smith	1889–1907	Illinois	Republican	1846–1907
Gerrit Smith	1853–1854	New York	Free Soiler	1797–1874
Gomer Griffith Smith	1937–1939	Oklahoma	Democratic	1896–1953
Green Clay Smith	1863–1866	Kentucky	Unconditional Unionist	1826–1895
H. Allen Smith	1957–1973	California	Republican	1909–1998
Henry Smith	1887–1889	Wisconsin	Laborite	1838–1916
Henry C. Smith	1899–1903	Michigan	Republican	1856–1911
Henry P. Smith III	1965–1975	New York	Republican	1911–1995
Hezekiah B. Smith	1879–1881	New Jersey	Democratic	1816–1887
Hiram Y. Smith	1884–1885	Iowa	Republican	1843–1894
Horace B. Smith	1871–1875	New York	Republican	1826–1888
Howard W. Smith	1931–1967	Virginia	Democratic	1883–1976
Isaac Smith	1795–1797	New Jersey	Federalist	1740–1807
Isaac Smith	1813–1815	Pennsylvania	Democratic-Republican	1761–1834
Israel Smith	1791–1795	Vermont	Anti-Administration	1759–1810
Israel Smith	1795–1797; 1801–1803	Vermont	Democratic-Republican	1759–1810
J. Hyatt Smith	1881–1883	New York	Independent	1824–1886
J. Joseph Smith	1935–1941	Connecticut	Democratic	1904–1980
James Strudwick Smith	1817–1821	North Carolina	Democratic-Republican	1790–1859
James Vernon Smith	1967–1969	Oklahoma	Republican	1926–1973
Jedediah K. Smith	1807–1809	New Hampshire	Democratic-Republican	1770–1828
Jeremiah Smith	1791–1795	New Hampshire	Pro-Administration	1759–1842
Jeremiah Smith	1795–1797	New Hampshire	Federalist	1759–1842
Joe L. Smith	1929–1945	West Virginia	Democratic	1880–1962
John Smith	1800–1804	New York	Democratic-Republican	1752–1816
John Smith	1801–1815	Virginia	Democratic-Republican	1750–1836
John Smith	1839–1841	Vermont	Democratic	1789–1858
John Ambler Smith	1873–1875	Virginia	Republican	1847–1892
John Armstrong Smith	1869–1873	Ohio	Republican	1814–1892
John Cotton Smith	1800–1806	Connecticut	Federalist	1765–1845
John M. C. Smith	1911–1921; 1921–1923	Michigan	Republican	1853–1923
John Quincy Smith	1873–1875	Ohio	Republican	1824–1901
John Speed Smith	1821–1823	Kentucky	Democratic-Republican	1792–1854
John T. Smith	1843–1845	Pennsylvania	Democratic	1801–1864
John Walter Smith	1899–1900	Maryland	Democratic	1845–1925
Joseph F. Smith	1981–1983	Pennsylvania	Democratic	1920–1999
Joseph Showalter Smith	1869–1871	Oregon	Democratic	1824–1884
Josiah Smith	1801–1803	Massachusetts	Democratic-Republican	1738–1803
Lamar Smith	1987–2019	Texas	Republican	1947–present
Larkin I. Smith	1989	Mississippi	Republican	1944–1989
Lawrence H. Smith	1941–1958	Wisconsin	Republican	1892–1958
Lawrence J. Smith	1983–1993	Florida	Democratic	1941–2026
Linda Smith	1995–1999	Washington	Republican	1950–present
Madison R. Smith	1907–1909	Missouri	Democratic	1850–1919
Marcus A. Smith	1887–1895; 1897–1899; 1901–1903; 1905–1909	Arizona	Democratic	1851–1924
Margaret Chase Smith	1940–1949	Maine	Republican	1897–1995
Martin F. Smith	1933–1943	Washington	Democratic	1891–1954
Nathaniel Smith	1795–1799	Connecticut	Federalist	1762–1822
Neal Smith	1959–1995	Iowa	Democratic	1920–2021
Nick Smith	1993–2005	Michigan	Republican	1934–present
O'Brien Smith	1805–1807	South Carolina	Democratic-Republican	c. 1756–1811
Oliver H. Smith	1827–1829	Indiana	Democratic	1794–1859
Peter Plympton Smith	1989–1991	Vermont	Republican	1945–present
Robert Smith	1843–1847	Illinois	Democratic	1802–1867
Robert Smith	1847–1849	Illinois	Independent Democrat	1802–1867
Robert Smith	1857–1859	Illinois	Democratic	1802–1867
Bob Smith	1983–1995; 1997–1999	Oregon	Republican	1931–2020
Samuel Smith	1793–1795	Maryland	Anti-Administration	1752–1839
Samuel Smith	1795–1803; 1816–1822	Maryland	Democratic-Republican	1752–1839
Samuel Smith	1805–1811	Pennsylvania	Democratic-Republican	N/A
Samuel Smith	1813–1815	New Hampshire	Federalist	1765–1842
Samuel A. Smith	1829–1833	Pennsylvania	Democratic	1795–1861
Samuel Axley Smith	1853–1859	Tennessee	Democratic	1822–1863
Samuel W. Smith	1897–1915	Michigan	Republican	1852–1931
Sylvester C. Smith	1905–1913	California	Republican	1858–1913
Thomas Smith	1815–1817	Pennsylvania	Federalist	????-1846
Thomas Smith	1839–1841; 1843–1847	Indiana	Democratic	1799–1876
Thomas Alexander Smith	1905–1907	Maryland	Democratic	1850–1932
Thomas Francis Smith	1917–1921	New York	Democratic	1865–1923
Thomas Vernor Smith	1939–1941	Illinois	Democratic	1890–1964
Truman Smith	1839–1843; 1845–1849	Connecticut	Whig	1791–1884
Virginia D. Smith	1975–1991	Nebraska	Republican	1911–2006
Walter I. Smith	1900–1911	Iowa	Republican	1862–1922
William Smith	1789–1791	Maryland	Anti-Administration	1728–1814
William Smith	1797–1799	South Carolina	Democratic-Republican	1751–1837
William Smith	1821–1825	Virginia	Democratic-Republican	N/A
William Smith	1825–1827	Virginia	Democratic	N/A
William Smith	1841–1843; 1853–1861	Virginia	Democratic	1797–1887
William Alden Smith	1895–1907	Michigan	Republican	1859–1932
William Alexander Smith	1873–1875	North Carolina	Republican	1828–1888
William Ephraim Smith	1875–1881	Georgia	Democratic	1829–1890
William Jay Smith	1869–1871	Tennessee	Republican	1823–1913
William Loughton Smith	1789–1795	South Carolina	Pro-Administration	1758–1812
William Loughton Smith	1795–1797	South Carolina	Federalist	1758–1812
William N. H. Smith	1859–1861	North Carolina	Oppositionist	1812–1889
William Orlando Smith	1903–1907	Pennsylvania	Republican	1859–1932
William Robert Smith	1903–1917	Texas	Democratic	1863–1924
William Russell Smith	1851–1853	Alabama	Unionist	1815–1896
William Russell Smith	1853–1855	Alabama	Democratic	1815–1896
William Russell Smith	1855–1857	Alabama	American	1815–1896
William Stephens Smith	1813–1815	New York	Federalist	1755–1816
Wint Smith	1947–1961	Kansas	Republican	1892–1976
Worthington Curtis Smith	1867–1873	Vermont	Republican	1823–1894
Nathaniel B. Smithers	1863–1865	Delaware	Unionist	1818–1896
John H. Smithwick	1919–1927	Florida	Democratic	1872–1948
Martin L. Smyser	1889–1891; 1905–1907	Ohio	Republican	1851–1908
Alexander Smyth	1817–1825	Virginia	Democratic-Republican	1765–1830
Alexander Smyth	1827–1830	Virginia	Democratic	1765–1830
George W. Smyth	1853–1855	Texas	Democratic	1803–1866
William Smyth	1869–1870	Iowa	Republican	1824–1870
Henry Snapp	1871–1873	Illinois	Republican	1822–1895
Howard M. Snapp	1903–1911	Illinois	Republican	1855–1938
William Henry Sneed	1855–1857	Tennessee	American	1812–1869
Bertrand Snell	1915–1939	New York	Republican	1870–1958
Samuel Snider	1889–1891	Minnesota	Republican	1845–1928
Charles Edward Snodgrass	1899–1903	Tennessee	Democratic	1866–1936
Henry C. Snodgrass	1891–1895	Tennessee	Democratic	1848–1931
John F. Snodgrass	1853–1854	Virginia	Democratic	1804–1854
John S. Snook	1901–1905; 1917–1919	Ohio	Democratic	1862–1952
Horace G. Snover	1895–1899	Michigan	Republican	1847–1924
Donald F. Snow	1929–1933	Maine	Republican	1877–1958
Herman W. Snow	1891–1893	Illinois	Democratic	1836–1914
William W. Snow	1851–1853	New York	Democratic	1812–1886
Vince Snowbarger	1997–1999	Kansas	Republican	1949–present
Olympia Snowe	1979–1995	Maine	Republican	1947–present
Adam W. Snyder	1837–1839	Illinois	Democratic	1799–1842
Charles P. Snyder	1883–1889	West Virginia	Democratic	1847–1915
Gene Snyder	1963–1965; 1967–1987	Kentucky	Republican	1928–2007
Homer P. Snyder	1915–1925	New York	Republican	1863–1937
J. Buell Snyder	1933–1946	Pennsylvania	Democratic	1877–1946
John Snyder	1841–1843	Pennsylvania	Democratic	1793–1850
Melvin C. Snyder	1947–1949	West Virginia	Republican	1898–1972
Oliver P. Snyder	1871–1875	Arkansas	Republican	1833–1882
Vic Snyder	1997–2011	Arkansas	Democratic	1947–present
Mike Sodrel	2005–2007	Indiana	Republican	1945–present
Stephen Solarz	1975–1993	New York	Democratic	1940–2010
Hilda Solis	2001–2009	California	Democratic	1957–present
Augustus Rhodes Sollers	1841–1843; 1853–1855	Maryland	Whig	1814–1862
Gerald Solomon	1979–1999	New York	Republican	1930–2001
Andrew Lawrence Somers	1925–1949	New York	Democratic	1895–1949
Peter J. Somers	1893–1895	Wisconsin	Democratic	1850–1924
Daniel E. Somes	1859–1861	Maine	Republican	1815–1888
Paul J. Sorg	1894–1897	Ohio	Democratic	1840–1902
John B. Sosnowski	1925–1927	Michigan	Republican	1883–1968
Mark Souder	1995–2010	Indiana	Republican	1950–2022
Nathan Soule	1831–1833	New York	Democratic	1790–1860
Charles L. South	1935–1943	Texas	Democratic	1892–1965
Robert G. Southall	1903–1907	Virginia	Democratic	1852–1924
Henry Southard	1801–1811; 1815–1821	New Jersey	Democratic-Republican	1747–1842
Isaac Southard	1831–1833	New Jersey	National Republican	1783–1850
James H. Southard	1895–1907	Ohio	Republican	1851–1919
Milton I. Southard	1873–1879	Ohio	Democratic	1836–1905
Steve Southerland	2011–2015	Florida	Republican	1965–present
William Wright Southgate	1837–1839	Kentucky	Whig	1800–1849
George N. Southwick	1895–1899; 1901–1911	New York	Republican	1863–1912
William Henry Sowden	1885–1889	Pennsylvania	Democratic	1840–1907
Zack Space	2007–2011	Ohio	Democratic	1961–present
Richard Dobbs Spaight	1798–1801	North Carolina	Democratic-Republican	1758–1802
Richard Dobbs Spaight Jr.	1823–1825	North Carolina	Democratic-Republican	1796–1850
Burleigh F. Spalding	1899–1901; 1903–1905	North Dakota	Republican	1853–1934
George Spalding	1895–1899	Michigan	Republican	1836–1915
Rufus P. Spalding	1863–1869	Ohio	Republican	1798–1886
Thomas Spalding	1805–1806	Georgia	Democratic-Republican	1774–1851
Abigail Spanberger	2019–2025	Virginia	Democratic	1979–present
David Spangler	1833–1837	Ohio	National Republican	1796–1856
Jacob Spangler	1817–1818	Pennsylvania	Democratic-Republican	1767–1843
Ross Spano	2019–2021	Florida	Republican	1966–present
John Sparkman	1937–1946	Alabama	Democratic	1899–1985
Stephen M. Sparkman	1895–1917	Florida	Democratic	1849–1929
Charles I. Sparks	1929–1933	Kansas	Republican	1872–1937
William A. J. Sparks	1875–1883	Illinois	Democratic	1828–1904
Elbridge G. Spaulding	1849–1851; 1859–1863	New York	Republican	1809–1897
Oliver L. Spaulding	1881–1883	Michigan	Republican	1833–1922
John C. Speaks	1921–1931	Ohio	Republican	1859–1945
James Z. Spearing	1924–1931	Louisiana	Democratic	1864–1942
Thomas Speed	1817–1819	Kentucky	Democratic-Republican	1768–1842
Emory Speer	1879–1883	Georgia	Independent Democrat	1848–1918
Peter Moore Speer	1911–1913	Pennsylvania	Republican	1862–1933
R. Milton Speer	1871–1875	Pennsylvania	Democratic	1838–1890
Thomas J. Speer	1871–1872	Georgia	Republican	1837–1872
Jackie Speier	2008–2023	California	Democratic	1950–present
Jesse Speight	1829–1837	North Carolina	Democratic	1795–1847
Gladys Spellman	1975–1981	Maryland	Democratic	1918–1988
Brent Spence	1931–1963	Kentucky	Democratic	1874–1967
Floyd Spence	1971–2001	South Carolina	Republican	1928–2001
John S. Spence	1823–1825	Maryland	Democratic-Republican	1788–1840
John S. Spence	1831–1833	Maryland	National Republican	1788–1840
Thomas A. Spence	1843–1845	Maryland	Whig	1810–1877
Ambrose Spencer	1829–1831	New York	National Republican	1765–1848
Elijah Spencer	1821–1823	New York	Democratic-Republican	1775–1852
James B. Spencer	1837–1839	New York	Democratic	1781–1848
James G. Spencer	1895–1897	Mississippi	Democratic	1844–1926
John Canfield Spencer	1817–1819	New York	Democratic-Republican	1788–1855
Richard Spencer	1829–1831	Maryland	Democratic	1796–1868
William B. Spencer	1876–1877	Louisiana	Democratic	1835–1882
Lewis Sperry	1891–1895	Connecticut	Democratic	1848–1922
Nehemiah D. Sperry	1895–1911	Connecticut	Republican	1827–1911
Thomas Spight	1898–1911	Mississippi	Democratic	1841–1924
Cyrus Spink	1859	Ohio	Republican	1793–1859
Solomon L. Spink	1869–1871	Dakota	Republican	1831–1881
Francis E. Spinner	1855–1861	New York	Democratic	1802–1890
Francis B. Spinola	1887–1891	New York	Democratic	1821–1891
Henry J. Spooner	1881–1891	Rhode Island	Republican	1839–1918
Charles F. Sprague	1897–1901	Massachusetts	Republican	1857–1902
Peleg Sprague	1797–1799	New Hampshire	Federalist	1756–1800
Peleg Sprague	1825–1829	Maine	National Republican	1793–1880
William Sprague III	1835–1837	Rhode Island	Whig	1799–1856
William Sprague	1849–1851	Michigan	Whig	1809–1868
William P. Sprague	1871–1875	Ohio	Republican	1827–1899
John Spratt	1983–2011	South Carolina	Democratic	1942–2024
James Sprigg	1841–1843	Kentucky	Whig	1802–1852
Michael Sprigg	1827–1831	Maryland	Democratic	1791–1845
Richard Sprigg Jr.	1796–1799; 1801–1802	Maryland	Democratic-Republican	c. 1769–1806
Thomas Sprigg	1793–1795	Maryland	Anti-Administration	1747–1809
Thomas Sprigg	1795–1797	Maryland	Democratic-Republican	1747–1809
John T. Spriggs	1883–1887	New York	Democratic	1825–1888
Raymond S. Springer	1939–1947	Indiana	Republican	1882–1947
William L. Springer	1951–1973	Illinois	Republican	1909–1992
William McKendree Springer	1875–1895	Illinois	Democratic	1836–1903
Elliott W. Sproul	1921–1931	Illinois	Republican	1856–1935
William H. Sproul	1923–1931	Kansas	Republican	1867–1932
Katharine St. George	1947–1965	New York	Republican	1894–1983
Fernand St Germain	1961–1989	Rhode Island	Democratic	1928–2014
Charles St. John	1871–1875	New York	Republican	1818–1891
Daniel B. St. John	1847–1849	New York	Whig	1808–1890
Henry St. John	1843–1847	Ohio	Democratic	1783–1869
Louis St. Martin	1851–1853; 1885–1887	Louisiana	Democratic	1820–1893
William St. Onge	1963–1970	Connecticut	Democratic	1914–1970
Debbie Stabenow	1997–2001	Michigan	Democratic	1950–present
Edmund J. Stack	1911–1913	Illinois	Democratic	1874–1957
Edward J. Stack	1979–1981	Florida	Democratic	1910–1989
Michael J. Stack	1935–1939	Pennsylvania	Democratic	1888–1960
Eli T. Stackhouse	1891–1892	South Carolina	Democratic	1824–1892
Neil Staebler	1963–1965	Michigan	Democratic	1905–2000
Robert Stafford	1961–1971	Vermont	Republican	1913–2006
William H. Stafford	1903–1911; 1913–1919; 1921–1923; 1929–1933	Wisconsin	Republican	1869–1957
Harley Orrin Staggers	1949–1981	West Virginia	Democratic	1907–1991
Harley O. Staggers Jr.	1983–1993	West Virginia	Democratic	1951–present
James Alonzo Stahle	1895–1897	Pennsylvania	Republican	1829–1912
William G. Stahlnecker	1885–1893	New York	Democratic	1849–1902
Lynn E. Stalbaum	1965–1967	Wisconsin	Democratic	1920–1999
Gale H. Stalker	1923–1935	New York	Republican	1889–1985
Jesse F. Stallings	1893–1901	Alabama	Democratic	1856–1928
Richard H. Stallings	1985–1993	Idaho	Democratic	1940–2025
James A. Stallworth	1857–1861	Alabama	Democratic	1822–1861
Edwin O. Stanard	1873–1875	Missouri	Republican	1832–1914
William Stanbery	1827–1833	Ohio	National Republican	1788–1873
James Israel Standifer	1823–1825	Tennessee	Democratic-Republican	1779–1837
James Israel Standifer	1829–1835	Tennessee	Democratic	1779–1837
James Israel Standifer	1835–1837	Tennessee	National Republican	1779–1837
James Israel Standifer	1837	Tennessee	Whig	1779–1837
Elisha Standiford	1873–1875	Kentucky	Democratic	1831–1887
Richard Stanford	1797–1816	North Carolina	Democratic-Republican	1767–1816
Arlan Stangeland	1977–1991	Minnesota	Republican	1930–2013
Augustus Owsley Stanley	1903–1915	Kentucky	Democratic	1867–1958
Thomas B. Stanley	1946–1953	Virginia	Democratic	1890–1970
Winifred C. Stanley	1943–1945	New York	Republican	1909–1996
Edward Stanly	1837–1843; 1849–1853	North Carolina	Whig	1810–1872
John Stanly	1801–1803; 1809–1811	North Carolina	Federalist	1774–1834
Benjamin Stanton	1851–1853	Ohio	Whig	1809–1872
Benjamin Stanton	1855–1861	Ohio	Republican	1809–1872
Frederick Perry Stanton	1845–1855	Tennessee	Democratic	1814–1894
J. William Stanton	1965–1983	Ohio	Republican	1924–2002
James V. Stanton	1971–1977	Ohio	Democratic	1932–2022
Joseph Stanton Jr.	1801–1807	Rhode Island	Democratic-Republican	1739–1807
Richard H. Stanton	1849–1855	Kentucky	Democratic	1812–1891
William Henry Stanton	1876–1877	Pennsylvania	Democratic	1843–1900
John H. Starin	1877–1881	New York	Republican	1825–1909
Pete Stark	1973–2013	California	Democratic	1931–2020
William L. Stark	1897–1903	Nebraska	Populist	1853–1922
Frank Starkey	1945–1947	Minnesota	Democratic-Farmer-Labor	1892–1968
David A. Starkweather	1839–1841; 1845–1847	Ohio	Democratic	1802–1876
George Anson Starkweather	1847–1849	New York	Democratic	1794–1879
Henry H. Starkweather	1867–1876	Connecticut	Republican	1826–1876
Joe Starnes	1935–1945	Alabama	Democratic	1895–1962
John F. Starr	1863–1867	New Jersey	Republican	1818–1904
Mick Staton	1981–1983	West Virginia	Republican	1940–2014
S. Walter Stauffer	1953–1955; 1957–1959	Pennsylvania	Republican	1888–1975
Henry B. Steagall	1915–1943	Alabama	Democratic	1873–1943
Asahel Stearns	1815–1817	Massachusetts	Federalist	1774–1839
Cliff Stearns	1989–2013	Florida	Republican	1941–present
Foster W. Stearns	1939–1945	New Hampshire	Republican	1881–1956
Henry G. Stebbins	1863–1864	New York	Democratic	1811–1881
Charles Manly Stedman	1911–1930	North Carolina	Democratic	1841–1930
William Stedman	1803–1810	Massachusetts	Federalist	1765–1831
Tom Steed	1949–1981	Oklahoma	Democratic	1904–1983
Michelle Steel	2021–2025	California	Republican	1955–present
George Washington Steele	1881–1889; 1895–1903	Indiana	Republican	1839–1922
Henry J. Steele	1915–1921	Pennsylvania	Democratic	1860–1933
John Steele	1790–1793	North Carolina	Pro-Administration	1764–1815
John B. Steele	1861–1865	New York	Democratic	1814–1866
John N. Steele	1834–1837	Maryland	National Republican	1796–1853
Leslie J. Steele	1927–1929	Georgia	Democratic	1868–1929
Robert H. Steele	1970–1975	Connecticut	Republican	1938–present
Thomas J. Steele	1915–1917	Iowa	Democratic	1853–1920
Walter Leak Steele	1877–1881	North Carolina	Democratic	1823–1891
William G. Steele	1861–1865	New Jersey	Democratic	1820–1892
William R. Steele	1873–1877	Wyoming	Democratic	1842–1901
Alan Steelman	1973–1977	Texas	Republican	1942–present
Halvor Steenerson	1903–1923	Minnesota	Republican	1852–1926
Lewis Steenrod	1839–1845	Virginia	Democratic	1810–1862
Newton Steers	1977–1979	Maryland	Republican	1917–1993
Karl Stefan	1935–1951	Nebraska	Republican	1884–1951
Sam Steiger	1967–1977	Arizona	Republican	1929–2012
William A. Steiger	1967–1978	Wisconsin	Republican	1938–1978
William Stenger	1875–1879	Pennsylvania	Democratic	1840–1918
Charles I. Stengle	1923–1925	New York	Democratic	1869–1953
Charles Stenholm	1979–2005	Texas	Democratic	1938–2023
Ambrose E. B. Stephens	1919–1927	Ohio	Republican	1862–1927
Abraham P. Stephens	1851–1853	New York	Democratic	1796–1859
Alexander H. Stephens	1843–1851	Georgia	Whig	1812–1883
Alexander H. Stephens	1851–1853	Georgia	Unionist	1812–1883
Alexander H. Stephens	1853–1855	Georgia	Whig	1812–1883
Alexander H. Stephens	1855–1859; 1873–1882	Georgia	Democratic	1812–1883
Dan V. Stephens	1911–1919	Nebraska	Democratic	1868–1939
Hubert D. Stephens	1911–1921	Mississippi	Democratic	1875–1946
John H. Stephens	1897–1917	Texas	Democratic	1847–1924
Philander Stephens	1829–1833	Pennsylvania	Democratic	1788–1842
Robert Grier Stephens Jr.	1961–1977	Georgia	Democratic	1913–2003
William Stephens	1911–1913	California	Republican	1859–1944
William Stephens	1913–1916	California	Progressive	1859–1944
Benjamin Stephenson	1814–1817	Illinois	None	1769–1822
Isaac Stephenson	1883–1889	Wisconsin	Republican	1829–1918
James Stephenson	1803–1805; 1809–1811; 1822–1825	Virginia	Federalist	1764–1833
Samuel M. Stephenson	1889–1897	Michigan	Republican	1831–1907
Samuel Sterett	1791–1793	Maryland	Anti-Administration	1758–1833
John B. Sterigere	1827–1831	Pennsylvania	Democratic	1793–1852
Ansel Sterling	1821–1825	Connecticut	Democratic-Republican	1782–1853
Bruce F. Sterling	1917–1919	Pennsylvania	Democratic	1870–1945
John A. Sterling	1903–1913; 1915–1918	Illinois	Republican	1857–1918
Micah Sterling	1821–1823	New York	Federalist	1784–1844
Charles Stetson	1849–1851	Maine	Democratic	1801–1863
Lemuel Stetson	1843–1845	New York	Democratic	1804–1868
Aaron Fletcher Stevens	1867–1871	New Hampshire	Republican	1819–1887
Bradford N. Stevens	1871–1873	Illinois	Democratic	1813–1885
Charles A. Stevens	1875	Massachusetts	Republican	1816–1892
Frederick Stevens	1897–1915	Minnesota	Republican	1861–1923
Hestor L. Stevens	1853–1855	Michigan	Democratic	1803–1864
Hiram S. Stevens	1875–1879	Arizona	Democratic	1832–1893
Isaac Stevens	1857–1861	Washington	Democratic	1818–1862
James Stevens	1819–1821	Connecticut	Democratic-Republican	1768–1835
Moses T. Stevens	1891–1895	Massachusetts	Democratic	1825–1907
Raymond B. Stevens	1913–1915	New Hampshire	Democratic	1874–1942
Robert S. Stevens	1883–1885	New York	Democratic	1824–1893
Thaddeus Stevens	1849–1853	Pennsylvania	Whig	1792–1868
Thaddeus Stevens	1859–1868	Pennsylvania	Republican	1792–1868
Adlai Stevenson I	1875–1877; 1879–1881	Illinois	Democratic	1835–1914
Andrew Stevenson	1821–1825	Virginia	Democratic-Republican	1784–1857
Andrew Stevenson	1825–1834	Virginia	Democratic	1784–1857
James S. Stevenson	1825–1829	Pennsylvania	Democratic	1780–1831
Job E. Stevenson	1869–1873	Ohio	Republican	1832–1922
John W. Stevenson	1857–1861	Kentucky	Democratic	1812–1886
William Francis Stevenson	1917–1933	South Carolina	Democratic	1861–1942
William H. Stevenson	1941–1949	Wisconsin	Republican	1891–1978
Lewis Steward	1891–1893	Illinois	Democratic	1824–1896
Alexander Stewart	1895–1901	Wisconsin	Republican	1829–1912
Andrew Stewart	1821–1823	Pennsylvania	Democratic-Republican	1791–1872
Andrew Stewart	1823–1829	Pennsylvania	Anti-Masonic	1791–1872
Andrew Stewart	1831–1833	Pennsylvania	Democratic-Republican	1791–1872
Andrew Stewart	1833–1835	Pennsylvania	Whig	1791–1872
Andrew Stewart	1843–1849	Pennsylvania	Whig	1791–1872
Andrew Stewart	1891–1892	Pennsylvania	Republican	1836–1903
Bennett Stewart	1979–1981	Illinois	Democratic	1912–1988
Charles Stewart	1883–1893	Texas	Democratic	1836–1895
Chris Stewart	2013–2023	Utah	Republican	1960–present
J. George Stewart	1935–1937	Delaware	Republican	1890–1970
Jacob H. Stewart	1877–1879	Minnesota	Republican	1829–1884
James Stewart	1818–1819	North Carolina	Federalist	1775–1821
James Augustus Stewart	1855–1861	Maryland	Democratic	1808–1879
James F. Stewart	1895–1903	New Jersey	Republican	1851–1904
John Stewart	1803–1805	Pennsylvania	Democratic-Republican	17??–1820
John Stewart	1843–1845	Connecticut	Democratic	1795–1860
John D. Stewart	1887–1891	Georgia	Democratic	1833–1894
John Knox Stewart	1899–1903	New York	Republican	1853–1919
John Wolcott Stewart	1883–1891	Vermont	Republican	1825–1915
Paul Stewart	1943–1947	Oklahoma	Democratic	1892–1950
Percy Hamilton Stewart	1931–1933	New Jersey	Democratic	1867–1951
Thomas E. Stewart	1867–1869	New York	Republican	1824–1904
William Stewart	1857–1861	Pennsylvania	Republican	1810–1876
William G. Stigler	1944–1952	Oklahoma	Democratic	1891–1952
John D. Stiles	1862–1865; 1869–1871	Pennsylvania	Democratic	1822–1896
William H. Stiles	1843–1845	Georgia	Democratic	1808–1865
Thomas N. Stilwell	1865–1867	Indiana	Republican	1830–1874
Walter R. Stiness	1915–1923	Rhode Island	Republican	1854–1924
K. William Stinson	1963–1965	Washington	Republican	1930–2002
Moses D. Stivers	1889–1891	New York	Republican	1828–1895
Steve Stivers	2011–2021	Ohio	Republican	1965–present
George R. Stobbs	1925–1931	Massachusetts	Republican	1877–1966
Henry Stockbridge Jr.	1889–1891	Maryland	Republican	1856–1924
T. R. Stockdale	1887–1895	Mississippi	Democratic	1828–1899
David Stockman	1977–1981	Michigan	Republican	1946–present
Lowell Stockman	1943–1953	Oregon	Republican	1901–1962
Steve Stockman	1995–1997; 2013–2015	Texas	Republican	1956–present
Strother M. Stockslager	1881–1885	Indiana	Democratic	1842–1930
Richard Stockton	1813–1815	New Jersey	Federalist	1764–1828
Ebenezer Stoddard	1821–1825	Connecticut	Democratic-Republican	1785–1847
John Truman Stoddert	1833–1835	Maryland	Democratic	1790–1870
Samuel Stokely	1841–1843	Ohio	Whig	1796–1861
Edward L. Stokes	1931–1935	Pennsylvania	Republican	1880–1964
J. William Stokes	1895–1896; 1896–1901	South Carolina	Democratic	1853–1901
Louis Stokes	1969–1999	Ohio	Democratic	1925–2015
William Brickly Stokes	1859–1861	Tennessee	Oppositionist	1814–1897
William Brickly Stokes	1866–1871	Tennessee	Republican	1814–1897
Philip H. Stoll	1919–1923	South Carolina	Democratic	1874–1958
Alfred P. Stone	1844–1845	Ohio	Democratic	1813–1865
Charles W. Stone	1890–1899	Pennsylvania	Republican	1843–1912
Claude U. Stone	1911–1917	Illinois	Democratic	1879–1957
David Stone	1799–1801	North Carolina	Democratic-Republican	1770–1818
Eben F. Stone	1881–1887	Massachusetts	Republican	1822–1895
Frederick Stone	1867–1871	Maryland	Democratic	1820–1899
James W. Stone	1843–1845; 1851–1853	Kentucky	Democratic	1813–1854
John W. Stone	1877–1881	Michigan	Republican	1838–1922
Joseph Champlin Stone	1877–1879	Iowa	Republican	1829–1902
Michael Jenifer Stone	1789–1791	Maryland	Anti-Administration	1747–1812
Ulysses S. Stone	1929–1931	Oklahoma	Republican	1878–1962
William Stone	1837–1839	Tennessee	Whig	1791–1853
William A. Stone	1891–1898	Pennsylvania	Republican	1846–1920
William Henry Stone	1873–1877	Missouri	Democratic	1828–1901
William J. Stone	1885–1891	Missouri	Democratic	1848–1918
William Johnson Stone	1885–1895	Kentucky	Democratic	1841–1923
Bellamy Storer	1835–1837	Ohio	National Republican	1796–1875
Bellamy Storer	1891–1895	Ohio	Republican	1847–1922
Clement Storer	1807–1809	New Hampshire	Democratic-Republican	1760–1830
Frederic Storm	1901–1903	New York	Republican	1844–1935
John B. Storm	1871–1875; 1883–1887	Pennsylvania	Democratic	1838–1901
Henry R. Storrs	1817–1821; 1823–1831	New York	Federalist	1787–1837
William L. Storrs	1829–1833	Connecticut	National Republican	1795–1861
William L. Storrs	1839–1840	Connecticut	Whig	1795–1861
Joseph Story	1808–1809	Massachusetts	Democratic-Republican	1779–1845
William L. Stoughton	1869–1873	Michigan	Republican	1827–1888
Byron G. Stout	1891–1893	Michigan	Democratic	1829–1896
Lansing Stout	1859–1861	Oregon	Democratic	1828–1871
Tom Stout	1913–1917	Montana	Democratic	1879–1965
John Hubler Stover	1868–1869	Missouri	Republican	1833–1889
Silas Stow	1811–1813	New York	Democratic–Republican	1773–1827
William Henry Harrison Stowell	1871–1877	Virginia	Republican	1840–1922
John G. Stower	1827–1829	New York	Democratic	1791–1850
Peter W. Strader	1869–1871	Ohio	Democratic	1818–1881
Horace B. Strait	1873–1879; 1881–1887	Minnesota	Republican	1835–1894
Thomas J. Strait	1893–1899	South Carolina	Democratic	1846–1924
James S. T. Stranahan	1855–1857	New York	Whig	1808–1898
Michael L. Strang	1985–1987	Colorado	Republican	1929–2014
Charles C. Stratton	1837–1839; 1841–1843	New Jersey	Whig	1796–1859
John Stratton	1801–1803	Virginia	Federalist	1769–1804
John L. N. Stratton	1859–1863	New Jersey	Republican	1817–1889
Nathan T. Stratton	1851–1855	New Jersey	Democratic	1813–1887
Samuel S. Stratton	1959–1989	New York	Democratic	1916–1990
William Stratton	1941–1943; 1947–1949	Illinois	Republican	1914–2001
Christian M. Straub	1853–1855	Pennsylvania	Democratic	1804–????
Isidor Straus	1894–1895	New York	Democratic	1845–1912
James Dale Strawbridge	1873–1875	Pennsylvania	Republican	1824–1890
Randall S. Street	1819–1821	New York	Federalist	1780–1841
Randolph Strickland	1869–1871	Michigan	Republican	1823–1880
Ted Strickland	1993–1995; 1997–2007	Ohio	Democratic	1941–present
Lawrence B. Stringer	1913–1915	Illinois	Democratic	1866–1942
Douglas R. Stringfellow	1953–1955	Utah	Republican	1922–1966
Jesse B. Strode	1895–1899	Nebraska	Republican	1845–1924
John Strohm	1845–1849	Pennsylvania	Whig	1793–1884
James Strong	1819–1821; 1823–1825	New York	Federalist	1783–1847
James Strong	1825–1831	New York	National Republican	1783–1847
James G. Strong	1919–1933	Kansas	Republican	1870–1938
Julius L. Strong	1869–1872	Connecticut	Republican	1828–1872
Luther M. Strong	1893–1897	Ohio	Republican	1838–1903
Nathan L. Strong	1917–1935	Pennsylvania	Republican	1859–1939
Selah B. Strong	1843–1845	New York	Democratic	1792–1872
Solomon Strong	1815–1819	Massachusetts	Federalist	1780–1850
Stephen Strong	1845–1847	New York	Democratic	1791–1866
Sterling P. Strong	1933–1935	Texas	Democratic	1862–1936
Theron R. Strong	1839–1841	New York	Democratic	1802–1873
William Strong	1811–1815; 1819–1821	Vermont	Democratic-Republican	1763–1840
William Strong	1847–1851	Pennsylvania	Democratic	1808–1895
George Strother	1817–1820	Virginia	Democratic-Republican	1783–1840
James F. Strother	1851–1853	Virginia	Whig	1811–1860
James F. Strother	1925–1929	West Virginia	Republican	1868–1930
Myer Strouse	1863–1867	Pennsylvania	Democratic	1825–1878
William F. Strowd	1895–1899	North Carolina	Populist	1832–1911
Isaac S. Struble	1883–1891	Iowa	Republican	1843–1913
William Francis Strudwick	1796–1797	North Carolina	Federalist	c. 1765–1812
Alexander Hugh Holmes Stuart	1841–1843	Virginia	Whig	1807–1891
Andrew Stuart	1853–1855	Ohio	Democratic	1823–1872
Archibald Stuart	1837–1839	Virginia	Democratic	1795–1855
Charles E. Stuart	1847–1849; 1851–1853	Michigan	Democratic	1810–1887
David Stuart	1853–1855	Michigan	Democratic	1816–1868
John T. Stuart	1839–1843	Illinois	Whig	1807–1885
John T. Stuart	1863–1865	Illinois	Democratic	1807–1885
Philip Stuart	1811–1819	Maryland	Federalist	1760–1830
Frank Stubblefield	1959–1974	Kentucky	Democratic	1907–1977
Henry E. Stubbs	1933–1937	California	Democratic	1881–1937
W. S. Stuckey Jr.	1967–1977	Georgia	Democratic	1935–present
Gerry Studds	1973–1997	Massachusetts	Democratic	1937–2006
Elmer E. Studley	1933–1935	New York	Democratic	1869–1942
Howard William Stull	1932–1933	Pennsylvania	Republican	1876–1949
Bob Stump	1977–1981	Arizona	Democratic	1927–2003
Bob Stump	1981–2003	Arizona	Republican	1927–2003
Herman Stump	1889–1893	Maryland	Democratic	1837–1917
Bart Stupak	1993–2011	Michigan	Democratic	1952–present
Jonathan Sturges	1789–1793	Connecticut	Pro-Administration	1740–1819
Lewis B. Sturges	1805–1817	Connecticut	Federalist	1763–1844
George Cookman Sturgiss	1907–1911	West Virginia	Republican	1842–1925
John C. Sturtevant	1897–1899	Pennsylvania	Republican	1835–1912
Christopher D. Sullivan	1917–1941	New York	Democratic	1870–1942
George Sullivan	1811–1813	New Hampshire	Federalist	1771–1838
John Andrew Sullivan	1903–1907	Massachusetts	Democratic	1868–1927
John B. Sullivan	1941–1943; 1945–1947; 1949–1951	Missouri	Democratic	1897–1951
John Sullivan	2002–2013	Oklahoma	Republican	1965–present
Leonor Sullivan	1953–1977	Missouri	Democratic	1902–1988
Maurice J. Sullivan	1943–1945	Nevada	Democratic	1884–1953
Patrick J. Sullivan	1929–1933	Pennsylvania	Republican	1877–1946
Timothy Sullivan	1903–1906; 1913	New York	Democratic	1862–1913
William V. Sullivan	1897–1898	Mississippi	Democratic	1857–1918
Cyrus A. Sulloway	1895–1913; 1915–1917	New Hampshire	Republican	1839–1917
Charles A. Sulzer	1917–1919; 1919	Alaska	Democratic	1879–1919
William Sulzer	1895–1912	New York	Democratic	1863–1941
George W. Summers	1841–1845	Virginia	Whig	1804–1868
John W. Summers	1919–1933	Washington	Republican	1870–1937
Charles A. Sumner	1883–1885	California	Democratic	1835–1903
Daniel H. Sumner	1883–1885	Wisconsin	Democratic	1837–1903
Jessie Sumner	1939–1947	Illinois	Republican	1898–1994
Hatton W. Sumners	1913–1947	Texas	Democratic	1875–1962
Thomas Sumter	1789–1793	South Carolina	Anti-Administration	1734–1832
Thomas Sumter	1797–1801	South Carolina	Democratic-Republican	1734–1832
Thomas De Lage Sumter	1839–1843	South Carolina	Democratic	1809–1874
Don Sundquist	1983–1995	Tennessee	Republican	1936–2023
Frank Sundstrom	1943–1949	New Jersey	Republican	1901–1980
Fofō Iosefa Fiti Sunia	1981–1988	American Samoa	Democratic	1937–2025
John E. Sununu	1997–2003	New Hampshire	Republican	1964–present
Daniel Sutherland	1921–1931	Alaska	Republican	1869–1955
George Sutherland	1901–1903	Utah	Republican	1862–1942
Howard Sutherland	1913–1917	West Virginia	Republican	1865–1950
Jabez G. Sutherland	1871–1873	Michigan	Democratic	1825–1902
Joel B. Sutherland	1827–1837	Pennsylvania	Democratic	1792–1861
Josiah Sutherland	1851–1853	New York	Democratic	1804–1887
Roderick D. Sutherland	1897–1901	Nebraska	Populist	1862–1915
William H. Sutphin	1931–1943	New Jersey	Democratic	1887–1972
Betty Sutton	2007–2013	Ohio	Democratic	1963–present
James Patrick Sutton	1949–1955	Tennessee	Democratic	1915–2005
Eric Swalwell	2013–2026	California	Democratic	1980–present
Samuel Swan	1821–1825	New Jersey	Democratic-Republican	1771–1844
Samuel Swan	1825–1831	New Jersey	National Republican	1771–1844
Fletcher B. Swank	1921–1929; 1931–1935	Oklahoma	Democratic	1875–1950
Edward Swann	1902–1903	New York	Democratic	1862–1945
Thomas Swann	1869–1879	Maryland	Democratic	1809–1883
Charles E. Swanson	1929–1933	Iowa	Republican	1879–1970
Claude A. Swanson	1893–1906	Virginia	Democratic	1862–1939
John Swanwick	1795–1798	Pennsylvania	Democratic-Republican	1759–1798
Peter Swart	1807–1809	New York	Democratic-Republican	1752–1829
Joshua W. Swartz	1925–1927	Pennsylvania	Republican	1867–1959
John P. Swasey	1908–1911	Maine	Republican	1839–1928
Henry Swearingen	1838–1841	Ohio	Democratic	c. 1792–1849
Lorenzo De Medici Sweat	1863–1865	Maine	Democratic	1818–1898
John E. Sweeney	1999–2007	New York	Republican	1955–present
Mac Sweeney	1985–1989	Texas	Republican	1955–2024
Martin L. Sweeney	1931–1943	Ohio	Democratic	1885–1960
Robert E. Sweeney	1965–1967	Ohio	Democratic	1924–2007
William N. Sweeney	1869–1871	Kentucky	Democratic	1832–1895
George Sweeny	1839–1843	Ohio	Democratic	1796–1877
Burton E. Sweet	1915–1923	Iowa	Republican	1867–1957
Edwin F. Sweet	1911–1913	Michigan	Democratic	1847–1935
John Hyde Sweet	1940–1941	Nebraska	Republican	1880–1964
Thaddeus C. Sweet	1923–1928	New York	Republican	1872–1928
Willis Sweet	1890–1895	Idaho	Republican	1856–1925
Charles Sweetser	1849–1853	Ohio	Democratic	1808–1864
Joseph Henry Sweney	1889–1891	Iowa	Republican	1845–1918
Richard N. Swett	1991–1995	New Hampshire	Democratic	1957–present
J. Howard Swick	1927–1935	Pennsylvania	Republican	1879–1952
Al Swift	1979–1995	Washington	Democratic	1935–2018
Benjamin Swift	1827–1831	Vermont	National Republican	1781–1847
Oscar W. Swift	1915–1919	New York	Republican	1869–1940
Zephaniah Swift	1793–1795	Connecticut	Pro-Administration	1759–1823
Zephaniah Swift	1795–1797	Connecticut	Federalist	1759–1823
John Swinburne	1885–1887	New York	Republican	1820–1889
Charles Swindall	1920–1921	Oklahoma	Republican	1876–1939
Pat Swindall	1985–1989	Georgia	Republican	1950–2018
Phil Swing	1921–1933	California	Republican	1884–1963
Robert M. Switzer	1911–1919	Ohio	Republican	1863–1952
Jacob Swoope	1809–1811	Virginia	Federalist	17??–1832
William I. Swoope	1923–1927	Pennsylvania	Republican	1862–1930
Guy J. Swope	1937–1939	Pennsylvania	Democratic	1892–1969
John Augustus Swope	1884–1885; 1885–1887	Pennsylvania	Democratic	1827–1910
King Swope	1919–1921	Kentucky	Republican	1893–1961
Samuel F. Swope	1855–1857	Kentucky	American	1809–1865
George Sykes	1843–1845; 1845–1847	New Jersey	Democratic	1802–1880
George G. Symes	1885–1889	Colorado	Republican	1840–1893
James W. Symington	1969–1977	Missouri	Democratic	1927–present
Steve Symms	1973–1981	Idaho	Republican	1938–2024
Mike Synar	1979–1995	Oklahoma	Democratic	1950–1996
J. Hale Sypher	1868–1869; 1870–1875	Louisiana	Republican	1837–1905
