= Joseph C. Sibley =

American politician (1850–1926)

Joseph Crocker Sibley, Jr.
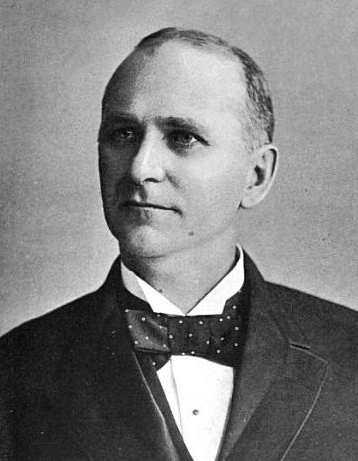
- Rep. Sibley c. 1900

Member of the U.S. House of Representatives from Pennsylvania
- In office March 4, 1893 – March 3, 1895
- Preceded by: Matthew Griswold
- Succeeded by: Matthew Griswold
- Constituency: 26th district
- In office March 4, 1899 – March 3, 1907
- Preceded by: Charles W. Stone
- Succeeded by: Nelson P. Wheeler
- Constituency: 27th district (1899–1903); 28th district (1903–07)

Personal details
- Born: February 18, 1850 Friendship, New York, U.S.
- Died: May 19, 1926 (aged 76) River Ridge Farm, Franklin, Pennsylvania, U.S.
- Cause of death: Heart attack
- Resting place: Franklin Cemetery, Pennsylvania, U.S.
- Party: Democratic (before 1900); Republican (after 1900)
- Other political affiliations: Prohibition; Populist

Joseph Crocker "Joe" Sibley, Jr. (February 18, 1850 – May 19, 1926) was an American livestock breeder, farmer, and politician who represented northwestern Pennsylvania in the United States House of Representatives for five terms.

== Biography ==
=== Early years ===
Joseph Crocker Sibley, Jr., known to his family and friends as "Joe," was born in Friendship, Allegany County, New York on February 18, 1850. His father, Joseph Crocker Sibley, Sr., was a medical doctor; his mother, the former Lucy Elvira Babcock, was a school teacher in the years before marriage. His parents instilled a love of reading in him at a young age and he read precociously from the age of 6, quickly tackling books intended for a more advanced readership.

In 1859 the Sibley family moved to Boston, a small town located in Erie County, New York. Joe attended the county schools and the local academies in the New York communities of Springville and Friendship.

Sibley's father died in 1866, spelling the end of his student days a year or two later. His bookish nature made Sibley a natural choice to work as had his mother as a school teacher, but he taught for only one year before leaving the profession. He took a job as a clerk in a dry goods store and harbored the dream of going to college to become a physician, going so far as to study medical books in his spare time. Sibley ultimately decided against this course of action, however.

In March 1870, Sibley married the former Metta Evalina Babcock, also hailing from the town of Friendship. The couple would remain married for over 40 years, raising two daughters together, with Metta dying on July 26, 1911.

=== Business career ===
Sibley determined to enter the oil-refining business and by 1873 he had managed to develop a new specialized product, a signal oil for railway use with superior illuminating property to the lighting oils then being used in the industry. He launched a company to manufacture and market this product, the Signal Oil Works. Sibley continued to innovate with petroleum refining and later developed a highly successful oil for valve lubrication.

In 1882 Miller and Sibley went into the livestock breeding business, launching a company called Miller & Sibley. The firm proved successful, gaining recognition in the breeding of horses and cattle. Race trotters were a particular specialty for the company, with Miller & Sibley owning as many as 250 head at the company's high point, some of which were worth thousands of dollars.

In 1902 Sibley formed a new venture in partnership with his brother-in-law Charles Miller, the Galena-Signal Oil Company. This venture proved successful, and Sibley and Miller became wealthy as a result. Galena Oil later became part of the Standard Oil combine, and then part of the corporations now known as Texaco and Valvoline.

=== Political career ===
Sibley launched a political career at an early age, winning election as mayor of Franklin, Pennsylvania, in 1879 at the age of 29.

The election of 1892 marked Sibley's entrance onto the national political stage. He was initially nominated for Congress by the Prohibition Party, who expected that the Democratic Party would soon follow suit by nominating him as their candidate in that district. Although not a total abstainer from alcohol, the newcomer Sibley won the respect of the Democratic establishment for his political courage by pointedly refusing to drink at a private banquet hosted by local brewers in the district, declaring that "I have been trusted by the Prohibitionists with their nomination, and I will not be false to the confidence which they have placed in me, not even in secret and not even as the price of a seat in the House of Representatives." The Democratic Party nominated Sibley nonetheless as its candidate in the 26th Congressional District, as did the People's Party.

Sibley proved to be an indefatigable campaigner in his first race for office, delivering as many as six speeches in a single day and developing strong oratorical ability. A local newspaper in a laudatory biography published after his death recalled that

It was at once recognized that he was a reasoner, a wit, a man of affairs, an orator, and best of all, a strong, courageous man with a big heart and helpful impulses.... The election returns showed that he had not only overcome the big hostile majority with which at the start he had been handicapped, but also that he had piled up for himself the surprising plurality of 3,387 over his principal competitor...

Sibley's upset victory in November 1892 won him a place in the Fifty-third Congress. In Washington the freshman Congressman emerged as a leading critic of the gold standard and advocate of unlimited coinage of silver. Sibley was also an advocate of depoliticizing the tariff question and an early advocate of a constitutional change which would have limited the President of the United States to a single 6-year term of office.

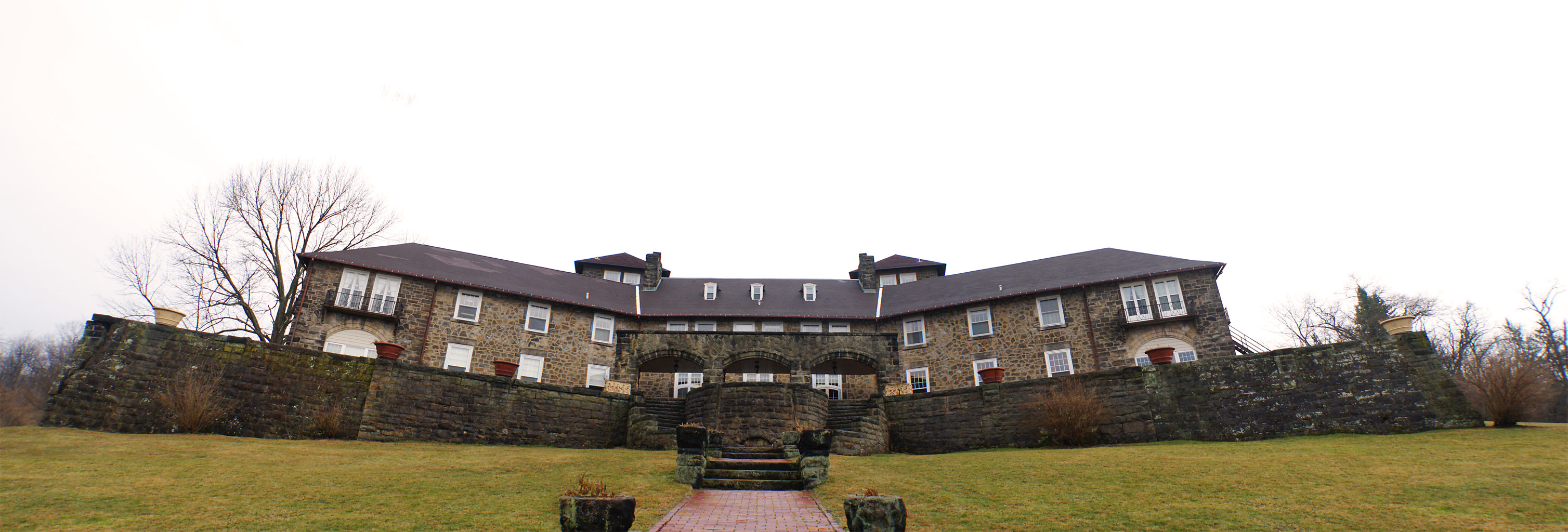
Joe Sibley's "River Ridge Farm" in 2009. Apparent slope of the roof is an optical illusion generated by a wide-angle lens.

He was the unsuccessful candidate of the Democratic and People's Parties for reelection in 1894, failing to win once again in the election of 1896. Sibley managed to win his second of five terms in Congress as a Democrat in November 1898, becoming a member of the Fifty-sixth Congress.

In 1900 Sibley switched his allegiance to the Republican Party and in November was elected as a Republican to the 57th United States Congress. He would gain reelection in 1902 and 1904 to the Fifty-eighth, and Fifty-ninth Congresses, respectively. He served as chairman of the House Committee on Manufactures during the Fifty-eighth and Fifty-ninth Congresses. He declined renomination in 1906, however, opting to return to private life.

A return to politics was planned for 1910, when Sibley was nominated once again for Congress, running for what would have been his sixth term in Washington. His plan was short-circuited by a severe heart attack in that year, however, leaving Sibley unable to campaign and he was forced to resign the nomination, thereby effectively ending his political career.

=== Death and legacy ===
During his later years, Sibley resumed his former manufacturing and agricultural pursuits at his well-known estate, "River Ridge Farm," located near Franklin, Pennsylvania. He was remarried in December 1913 to the former Ida Rew of Franklin, Pennsylvania.

His health began to decline further during the middle 1920s, with Sibley suffering a stroke in 1925.

On the morning of May 19, 1926 at 9:10 am while at home at River Ridge, Sibley was stricken by a massive heart attack. Sibley died instantly from this cardiac event; he was 76 years old at the time of his death.

A large funeral service was held for Sibley at the First Baptist Church of Franklin, with four ministers helping to conduct the ceremony and a local newspaper publisher delivering the eulogy, in accordance with Sibley's specific request.

Sibley's body was interred in Franklin Cemetery.

== Works ==
- Speech of Hon. Joseph C. Sibley, of Pennsylvania, in the House of Representatives, August 18, 1893. Washington, DC: George R. Gray, 1893.
- Observations and Experiments with the Mammoth French White Jerusalem Artichoke to Date of April 1, 1924: River RIdge Farm, Joseph C. Sibley, proprietor. Oil City, PA: Derrick Publishing Co., 1924.

U.S. House of Representatives
Preceded by Matthew Griswold	Member of the U.S. House of Representatives from Pennsylvania's 26th congressional district 1893–1895	Succeeded by Matthew Griswold
Preceded by Charles W. Stone	Member of the U.S. House of Representatives from Pennsylvania's 27th congressional district 1899–1903	Succeeded by William O. Smith
Preceded by James K. P. Hall	Member of the U.S. House of Representatives from Pennsylvania's 28th congressional district 1903–1907	Succeeded by Nelson P. Wheeler
