= Norman Hall (politician) =

American politician

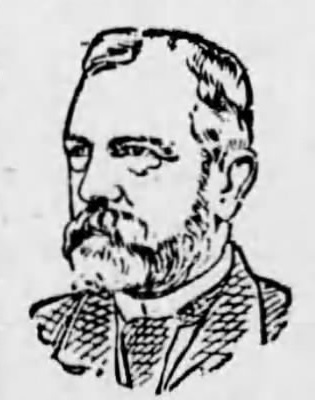
- Philadelphia Times, November 6, 1886

Member of the U.S. House of Representatives from Pennsylvania's 26th district
- In office March 4, 1887 – March 3, 1889
- Preceded by: George Washington Fleeger
- Succeeded by: William Constantine Culbertson

Personal details
- Born: November 17, 1829 Halls Station, Pennsylvania, U.S.
- Died: September 29, 1917 (aged 87) Sharon, Pennsylvania, U.S.
- Resting place: Hall's Burying Ground in Halls Station
- Party: Democratic
- Education: Dickinson College

Norman Hall (November 17, 1829 – September 29, 1917) was a 19th-century American businessman and politician who for one term was a Democratic member of the U.S. House of Representatives from Pennsylvania from 1887 to 1889.

== Biography ==
Norman Hall was born on the Muncy Farms, near Halls Station, Pennsylvania. He was graduated from Dickinson College in Carlisle, Pennsylvania, in 1847. He was engaged in the iron business.

=== Congress ===
Hall was elected as a Democrat to the Fiftieth Congress. He was engaged in banking in Sharon, Pennsylvania.

=== Retirement and death ===
He retired from active business, and died in Sharon in 1917. Interment in Hall's Burying Ground in Halls Station.

== Sources ==
- United States Congress. "Norman Hall (id: H000063)". Biographical Directory of the United States Congress.
- The Political Graveyard

U.S. House of Representatives
Preceded by George W. Fleeger	Member of the U.S. House of Representatives from Pennsylvania's 26th congressional district 1887–1889	Succeeded by William C. Culbertson
