= William Constantine Culbertson =

American politician

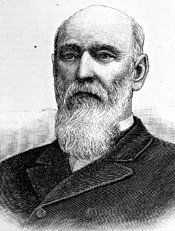
- Portrait of William Constantine Culbertson, US Representative from Pennsylvania

Member of the U.S. House of Representatives from Pennsylvania's 26th district
- In office March 4, 1889 – March 3, 1891
- Preceded by: Norman Hall
- Succeeded by: Matthew Griswold

Personal details
- Born: November 25, 1825 Edinboro, Pennsylvania, U.S.
- Died: May 24, 1906 (aged 80)
- Party: Republican

William Constantine Culbertson (November 25, 1825 – May 24, 1906) was a Republican member of the U.S. House of Representatives from Pennsylvania.

William C. Culbertson was born in Edinboro, Pennsylvania. He attended the common schools of his native town. He was engaged in lumbering on the Allegheny River in Jefferson County, Pennsylvania, and also operated a mill and a factory at Covington, Kentucky. He owned slaves. He moved to Girard, Pennsylvania, in 1863. He purchased extensive tracts of timberland in Michigan, Wisconsin, and other States, and later became interested in agricultural pursuits in Minnesota and in his native county. He served as president of the Citizens' National Bank of Corry, Pennsylvania.

Culbertson was elected as a Republican to the Fifty-first Congress. He was an unsuccessful candidate for renomination in 1890. He resumed his former business activities and died in Girard in 1906. Interment in Girard Cemetery.

== Sources ==
- United States Congress. "William Constantine Culbertson (id: C000965)". Biographical Directory of the United States Congress.
- The Political Graveyard

U.S. House of Representatives
Preceded by Norman Hall	Member of the U.S. House of Representatives from Pennsylvania's 26th congressional district 1889–1891	Succeeded by Matthew Griswold
