= Harve Tibbott =

American politician

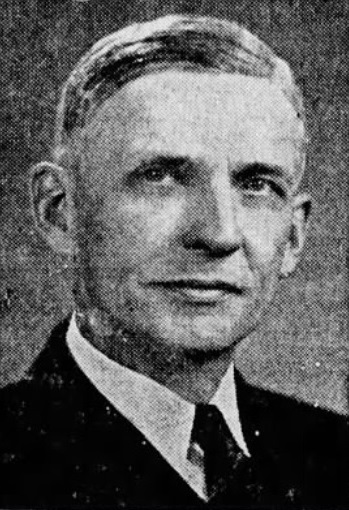
- The Brockway Record, April 19, 1940

Member of the U.S. House of Representatives from Pennsylvania
- In office January 3, 1939 – January 3, 1949
- Preceded by: Joseph A. Gray (27th); Louis E. Graham (26th)
- Succeeded by: Augustine B. Kelley (27th); Robert L. Coffey (26th)
- Constituency: 27th district (1939-45); 26th district (1945-49)

Personal details
- Born: May 27, 1885 Ebensburg, Pennsylvania, U.S.
- Died: December 31, 1969 (aged 84) Ebensburg, Pennsylvania, U.S.
- Party: Republican

Harve Tibbott (May 27, 1885 – December 31, 1969) was an American pharmacist who was as a Republican member of the U.S. House of Representatives from Pennsylvania, serving five terms in office from 1939 to 1949.

== Formative years ==
Tibbott was born near Ebensburg, Pennsylvania. He graduated from the school of pharmacy of the University of Pittsburgh in 1906.

== Career ==
Tibbott began his professional life in retail drug business by working as a pharmacist in Ebensburg in 1906.

=== Politics ===
He subsequently became the treasurer of the William Penn Highway Association, and served in that capacity from 1913 to 1915. He then became the treasurer of Cambria County, Pennsylvania, and served in that role from 1932 to 1935. A member of the Republican State committee in 1936 and 1937, he assumed the job of president of the First National Bank of Ebensburg in 1938.

=== Congress ===
Tibbott was elected as a Republican to the Seventy-sixth and to the four succeeding Congresses. He was an unsuccessful candidate for reelection in 1948, defeated by Democrat Robert L. Coffey.

== Death and interment ==
Tibbott died in Ebensburg on December 31, 1969, and was interred in the Lloyd Cemetery.

U.S. House of Representatives
Preceded by Joseph Gray	Member of the U.S. House of Representatives from Pennsylvania's 27th congressional district 1939–1945	Succeeded by Augustine B. Kelley
Preceded by Louis E. Graham	Member of the U.S. House of Representatives from Pennsylvania's 26th congressional district 1945–1949	Succeeded by Robert L. Coffey, Jr.
