= George Washington Fleeger =

American politician

George W. Fleeger

Member of the U.S. House of Representatives from Pennsylvania's 26th district
- In office March 4, 1885 – March 3, 1887
- Preceded by: Samuel Henry Miller
- Succeeded by: Norman Hall

Member of the Pennsylvania House of Representatives
- In office 1871-1872

Personal details
- Born: March 13, 1839 Concord Township, Pennsylvania, U.S
- Died: June 25, 1904 (aged 65) Butler, Pennsylvania, U.S
- Party: Republican

Military service
- Allegiance: United States
- Branch/service: Union Army
- Years of service: 1861-1865
- Rank: Captain
- Unit: Company C, 11th Pennsylvania Reserve Regiment

George Washington Fleeger (March 13, 1839 – June 25, 1904) was a Republican member of the U.S. House of Representatives from Pennsylvania.

== Biography ==
George W. Fleeger was born in Concord Township, Pennsylvania. He attended the common schools and West Sunbury Academy.

He was enlisted in the Union Army on June 10, 1861, as a private in Company C, 11th Pennsylvania Reserve Regiment, and was commissioned a first lieutenant in June 1862. He was brevetted captain, and served until March 13, 1865.

He studied law, was admitted to the bar in 1866 and commenced practice in Butler. Fleeger served as a member of the Pennsylvania State House of Representatives in 1871 and 1872. He was the chairman of the Republican State central committee, and a delegate to the Republican State conventions in 1882 and 1890.

Fleeger was elected as a Republican to the Forty-ninth Congress. He resumed the practice of law in Butler, Pennsylvania, and died there in 1904. Interment in the North Cemetery.

U.S. House of Representatives
| Preceded by Samuel H. Miller | Member of the U.S. House of Representatives from Pennsylvania's 26th congressional district 1885–1887 | Succeeded by Norman Hall |
