= Robert L. Coffey =

American politician

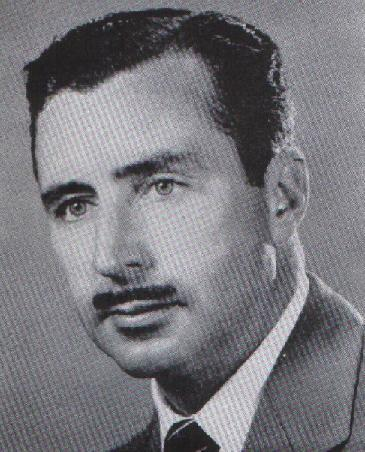

Member of the U.S. House of Representatives from Pennsylvania's 26th district
- In office January 3, 1949 – April 20, 1949
- Preceded by: Harve Tibbott
- Succeeded by: John P. Saylor

Personal details
- Born: Robert Lewis Coffey Jr. October 21, 1918 Chattanooga, Tennessee, U.S.
- Died: April 20, 1949 (aged 30) Albuquerque, New Mexico, U.S.
- Party: Democratic

Robert Lewis Coffey Jr. (October 21, 1918 – April 20, 1949) was an American coal miner, World War II veteran, and politician who served briefly as a Democratic member of the U.S. House of Representatives from Pennsylvania.

A former military fighter pilot, Coffey was killed after only four months in Congress when a military aircraft he was co-piloting crashed in an experimental flight.

== Early life and career ==
Robert Coffey was born in Chattanooga, Tennessee, and moved with his parents in early boyhood to Pennsylvania. He attended the University of Pittsburgh and Pennsylvania State University.

He was employed in coal mines in all positions from coal loader to engineer.

=== World War II and military career ===
During World War II, he served in the United States Army Air Forces. He flew as a member of the 365th Fighter Group, called the "Hell Hawks," piloting the P-47 Thunderbolt. He commanded the group's 388th Fighter Squadron and was later deputy commander of the group. He was the group's top air ace with credit for six aerial victories during 97 missions. He was shot down and evaded capture.

He was the military air attaché for the United States Embassy in Santiago, Chile, from October 1945 to April 1948. He resigned his commission as a lieutenant colonel to pursue a political candidacy. He was commissioned a colonel in the United States Air Force Reserve.

== Congress ==
He was elected as a Democrat to the 81st Congress in 1948, defeating incumbent Republican Congressman Harve Tibbott, and served from January 3, 1949, until his death in an airplane accident at Kirtland Air Force Base near Albuquerque, New Mexico.

=== Personal life ===
Coffey was married to Eileen Mercado Parra, with whom he had three children: Robert Lewis, Eileen María and David Mario.

=== Death ===
On April 20, 1949, Coffey was killed in the crash of Lockheed F-80A-10-LO Shooting Star, 44-85438, c/n 080-1461, while on take-off from Kirtland AFB, New Mexico, at 1640 hrs during a cross-country proficiency flight. He and fellow Hell Hawks pilot Lt. Col. William D. Ritchie had departed Kirtland after refueling for March AFB, California, but due to apparent engine failure on take-off, the fighter never rose above 25 feet (7.6 m), skidded off the end of the runway, cartwheeled across an arroyo, and broke apart but did not burn. Coffey was killed instantly. He is buried in Arlington National Cemetery. The House of Representatives recessed for one day in his honor.

== Awards and decorations ==
For his military service, he was awarded the following awards:

United States Army Air Forces pilot badge

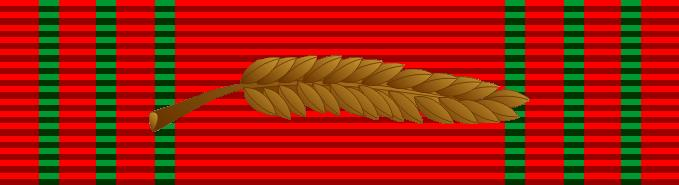
Distinguished Flying Cross with two bronze oak leaf clusters
Bronze Star Medal
Purple Heart
Air Medal with four silver oak leaf clusters
Air Medal with silver oak leaf cluster (second ribbon required for accouterment spacing)
Air Force Presidential Unit Citation
American Defense Service Medal
American Campaign Medal
European-African-Middle Eastern Campaign Medal with silver campaign star
World War II Victory Medal
Air Force Longevity Service Award
Croix de Guerre with Palm (France)
Croix de Guerre with Palm (Belgium)
Order of Merit, degree unknown (Chile)

== See also ==
- List of members of the United States Congress who died in office (1900–1949)

U.S. House of Representatives
Preceded by Harve Tibbott	Member of the U.S. House of Representatives from Pennsylvania's 26th congressional district 1949	Succeeded by John P. Saylor
