= Arthur L. Bates =

American politician

Arthur Laban Bates
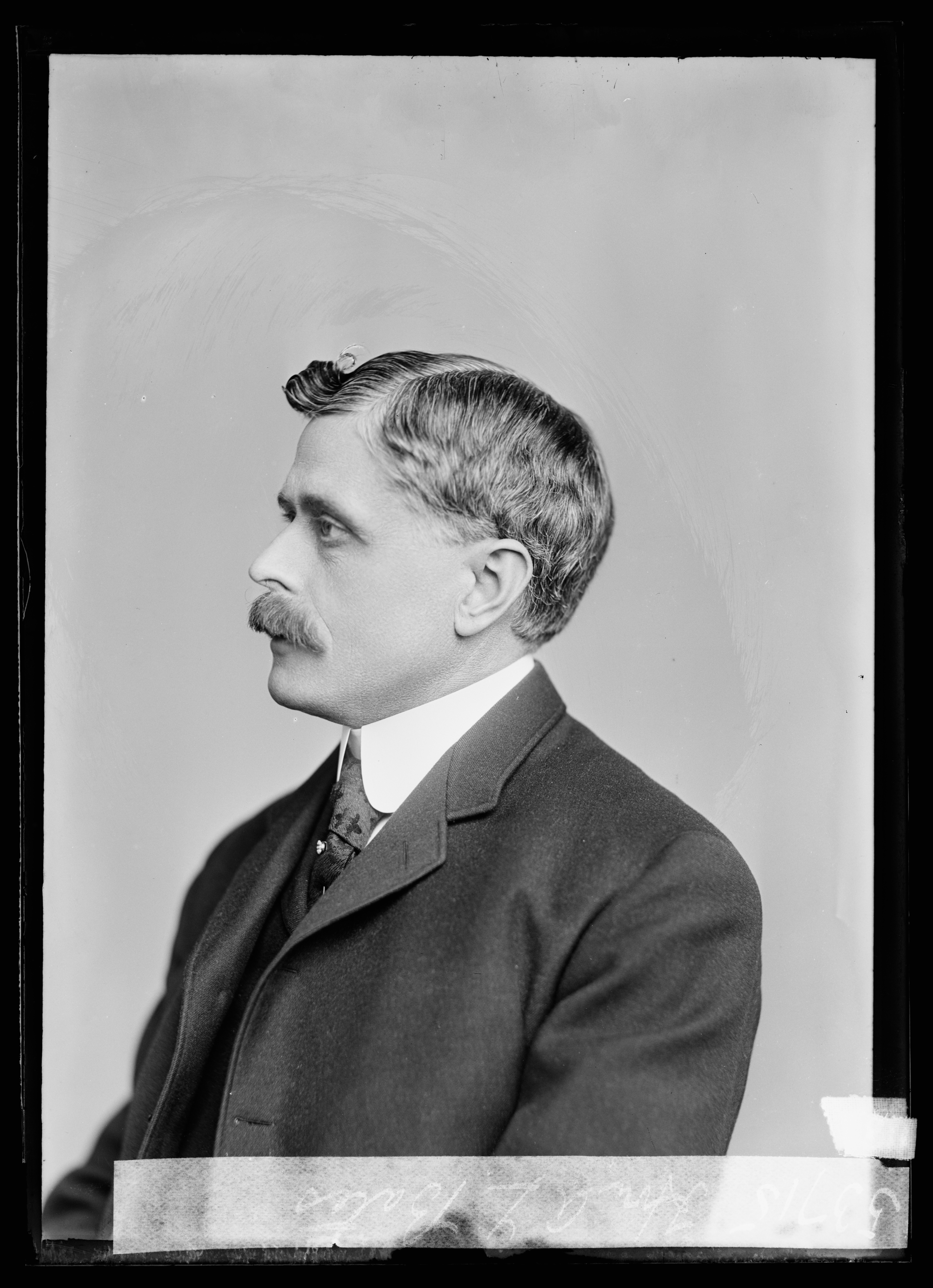

Member of the U.S. House of Representatives from Pennsylvania
- In office March 4, 1901 – March 3, 1913
- Preceded by: Athelston Gaston
- Succeeded by: Milton W. Shreve
- Constituency: 26th district (1901–1903); 25th district (1903–1913)

Personal details
- Born: June 6, 1859 Meadville, Pennsylvania, U.S.
- Died: August 26, 1934 (aged 75)
- Party: Republican
- Spouse: Josephine Rusling
- Children: Arthur Rusling Bates
- Parents: Samuel Penniman Bates (father); Sarah Josephine Bates (mother)

Arthur Laban Bates (June 6, 1859 – August 26, 1934) was a Republican politician, lawyer, and businessman from the state of Pennsylvania. Born in Meadville, Pennsylvania, he was the nephew of John Milton Thayer, a U.S. Senator and Governor of Nebraska. Bates received his early education through tutors before graduating from Allegheny College in 1880. He studied law and was admitted to the bar in 1882, later attending Oxford University in England from 1882 to 1883.

Bates began practicing law in Meadville in 1884 and also ventured into newspaper publishing in 1899. He served as the city solicitor of Meadville from 1889 to 1896. His political career took off when he was elected to the United States House of Representatives as a Republican to the Fifty-seventh and to the five succeeding Congresses. During his time in Congress, he represented Pennsylvania's 26th district and was involved in international diplomacy, attending the International Peace Conference in Brussels in 1905 and Rome in 1911.

After leaving Congress in 1913, having declined to run for another term, Bates returned to law and publishing. He was also involved in the banking sector and continued to serve his party as a delegate to the Republican National Convention in 1924. He died in Meadville in 1934 and was interred at Greendale Cemetery.

== Sources ==
- United States Congress. "Arthur L. Bates (id: B000230)". Biographical Directory of the United States Congress.
- The Political Graveyard

U.S. House of Representatives
Preceded by Athelston Gaston	Member of the U.S. House of Representatives from Pennsylvania's 26th congressional district 1901–1903	Succeeded by Joseph H. Shull
Preceded by Joseph B. Showalter	Member of the U.S. House of Representatives from Pennsylvania's 25th congressional district 1903–1913	Succeeded by Milton W. Shreve
