= Athelston Gaston =

American politician

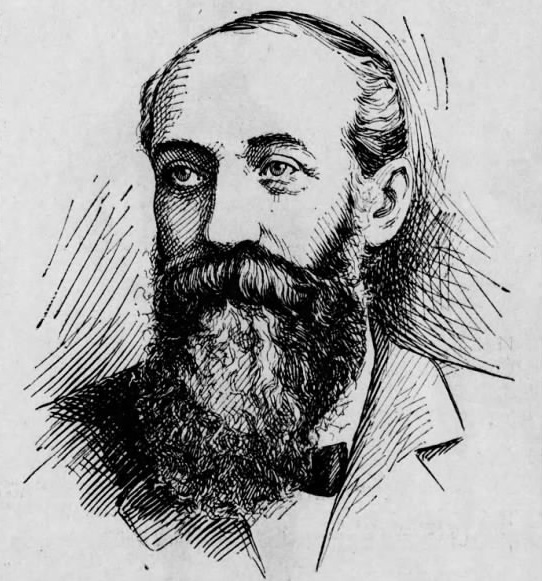
- The Philadelphia Times, November 15, 1898

Member of the U.S. House of Representatives from Pennsylvania's 26th district
- In office March 4, 1899 – March 3, 1901
- Preceded by: John Cirby Sturtevant
- Succeeded by: Arthur Laban Bates

Personal details
- Born: April 24, 1838 Castile, New York, U.S.
- Died: September 23, 1907 (aged 69) Quebec, Canada
- Party: Democratic

Athelston Gaston (April 24, 1838 – September 23, 1907) was a Democratic member of the U.S. House of Representatives from Pennsylvania.

== Biography ==
Athelston Gaston was born in Castile, New York. He moved with his parents to Crawford County, Pennsylvania, in 1854. He was engaged in agricultural pursuits until 1873, when he became a dealer in and manufacturer of lumber. He served as mayor of Meadville, Pennsylvania, from 1891 to 1895.

Gaston was elected as a Democrat to the Fifty-sixth Congress. He was an unsuccessful candidate for reelection in 1900. He resumed the lumber business.

Gaston was killed while on a hunting trip along Lake Edward in northern Quebec, Canada, in 1907. There was no ceremony. Interment in Greendale Cemetery in Meadville, Pennsylvania.

== Sources ==
- United States Congress. "Athelston Gaston (id: G000095)". Biographical Directory of the United States Congress.
- The Political Graveyard

U.S. House of Representatives
| Preceded by John C. Sturtevant | Member of the U.S. House of Representatives from Pennsylvania's 26th congressional district 1899–1901 | Succeeded by Arthur L. Bates |
