= Matthew Griswold (Pennsylvania politician) =

American politician (1833–1919)

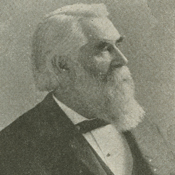

Member of the U.S. House of Representatives from Pennsylvania's 26th district
- In office March 4, 1895 – March 3, 1897
- Preceded by: Joseph C. Sibley
- Succeeded by: John Cirby Sturtevant
- In office March 4, 1891 – March 3, 1893
- Preceded by: William Constantine Culbertson
- Succeeded by: Joseph C. Sibley

Member of the Connecticut House of Representatives
- In office 1862; 1865

Personal details
- Born: June 6, 1833 Lyme, Connecticut, U.S.
- Died: May 19, 1919 (aged 85) Erie, Pennsylvania, U.S.
- Party: Republican
- Occupation: Manufacturer, Politician
- Known for: Griswold Manufacturing

Matthew Griswold (/ˈɡrɪzwɔːld, -wəld/; June 6, 1833 – May 19, 1919) was an American Congressman from Erie, Pennsylvania.

== Biography ==
Matthew Griswold was the grandson of congressman Roger Griswold and the great-grandson of governor Matthew Griswold. He was born in Lyme, Connecticut. He was engaged in teaching and in agricultural pursuits for a number of years, and was elected to various local offices. He was a member of the Connecticut House of Representatives in 1862 and 1865. In 1866 he moved to Erie, Pennsylvania, and co-founded what became Griswold Manufacturing, a maker of cast-iron products. He was elected a trustee of the Erie Academy for four successive terms.

Griswold was elected as a Republican to the 52nd Congress, but was not a candidate for renomination in 1892. He was again elected to the 54th Congress, but was not a candidate for renomination in 1896.

== Sources ==
- United States Congress. "Matthew Griswold (id: G000487)". Biographical Directory of the United States Congress.

U.S. House of Representatives
| Preceded by William C. Culbertson | Member of the U.S. House of Representatives from Pennsylvania's 26th congressional district 1891–1893 | Succeeded by Joseph C. Sibley |
| Preceded by Joseph C. Sibley | Member of the U.S. House of Representatives from Pennsylvania's 26th congressional district 1895–1897 | Succeeded by John C. Sturtevant |
