= Joseph Davis Brodhead =

American politician

Jefferson Davis Brodhead
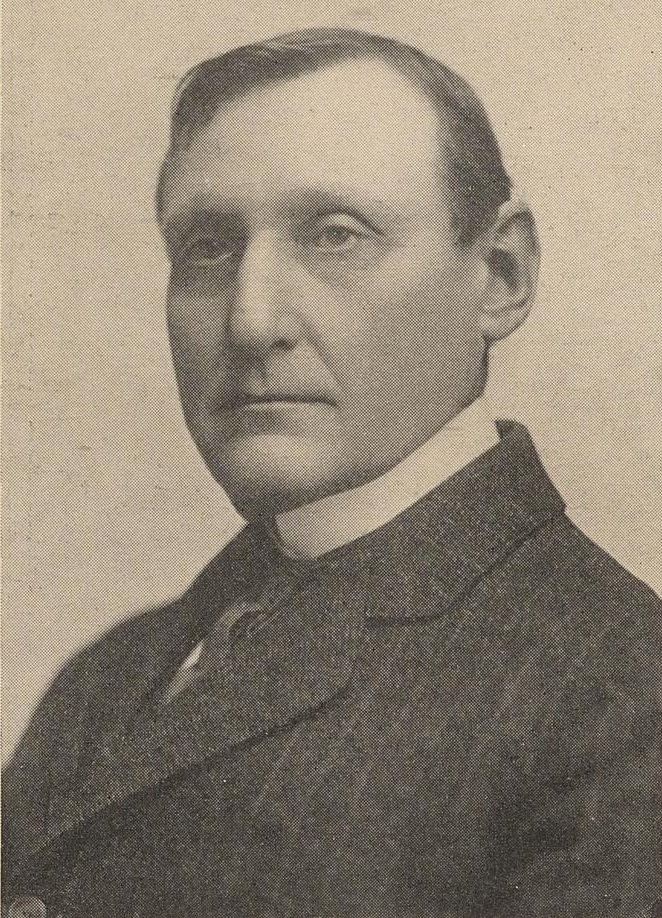
- From 1915's Semi-centennial: The Borough of South Bethlehem, Pennsylvania; Souvenir History, 1865–1915

Member of the U.S. House of Representatives from Pennsylvania's 26th district
- In office March 4, 1907 – March 3, 1909
- Preceded by: Gustav A. Schneebeli
- Succeeded by: A. Mitchell Palmer

Personal details
- Born: January 12, 1859 Easton, Pennsylvania, US
- Died: April 23, 1920 (aged 61) Washington, D.C., US
- Party: Democratic

Jefferson Davis Brodhead (January 12, 1859 – April 23, 1920), also known as J. Davis Brodhead and Joseph Davis Brodhead, was an American lawyer and politician who served as a Democratic member of the U.S. House of Representatives from Pennsylvania for one term from 1907 to 1909.

== Life and career ==
J. Davis Brodhead (son of Richard Brodhead) was born in Easton, Pennsylvania. He attended the public schools, studied law, was admitted to the bar in 1881 and commenced practice in Stroudsburg, Pennsylvania.

He was elected as district attorney of Northampton County, Pennsylvania, in 1889. He was a delegate to the Democratic National Conventions in 1892 and 1904.

Brodhead was elected as a Democrat to the Sixtieth Congress. He was an unsuccessful candidate for renomination in 1908. He resumed the practice of law in South Bethlehem, Pennsylvania. He was appointed judge of the courts of record of Northampton County in 1914.

He died in Washington, D.C., in 1920. He is interred in the Easton Cemetery in Easton.

== Sources ==
- United States Congress. "J. Davis Brodhead (id: B000860)". Biographical Directory of the United States Congress.
- The Political Graveyard

U.S. House of Representatives
Preceded by Gustav A. Schneebeli	Member of the U.S. House of Representatives from Pennsylvania's 26th congressional district 1907–1909	Succeeded by A. Mitchell Palmer
