= Pennsylvania's 26th congressional district =

Former U.S. House district in Pennsylvania

Coordinates: 40°10′N 80°10′W

- Obsolete district
- Created: 1875
- Eliminated: 1970
- Years active: 1875-1973

Pennsylvania's 26th congressional district was one of Pennsylvania's districts of the United States House of Representatives.

== List of representatives ==
Representative	Party	Years	Cong ress	District home	Note
District established March 4, 1875
James Sheakley (Greenville)	Democrat	March 4, 1875 – March 3, 1877	44th		Elected in 1874. [data missing]
John M. Thompson (Butler)	Republican	March 4, 1877 – March 3, 1879	45th		Elected in 1876. Not a candidate for renomination.
Samuel B. Dick (Meadville)	Republican	March 4, 1879 – March 3, 1881	46th		Elected in 1878. Not a candidate for reelection.
Samuel H. Miller (Mercer)	Republican	March 4, 1881 – March 3, 1885	47th 48th		Elected in 1880. Re-elected in 1882. Declined to be a candidate for renomination.
George W. Fleeger (Butler)	Republican	March 4, 1885 – March 3, 1887	49th		Elected in 1884. [data missing]
Norman Hall (Sharon)	Democrat	March 4, 1887 – March 3, 1889	50th		Elected in 1886. [data missing]
William C. Culbertson (Girard)	Republican	March 4, 1889 – March 3, 1891	51st		Elected in 1888. Unsuccessful candidate for renomination.
Matthew Griswold (Erie)	Republican	March 4, 1891 – March 3, 1893	52nd		Elected in 1890. Not a candidate for renomination.
Joseph C. Sibley (Franklin)	Democrat	March 4, 1893 – March 3, 1895	53rd		Elected in 1892. Unsuccessful candidate for reelection.
Matthew Griswold (Erie)	Republican	March 4, 1895 – March 3, 1897	54th		Elected in 1894. Not a candidate for renomination.
John C. Sturtevant (Conneautville)	Republican	March 4, 1897 – March 3, 1899	55th		Elected in 1896; Not a candidate for renomination.
Athelston Gaston (Meadville)	Democrat	March 4, 1899 – March 3, 1901	56th		Elected in 1898. Unsuccessful candidate for reelection
Arthur L. Bates (Meadville)	Republican	March 4, 1901 – March 3, 1903	57th		Elected in 1900. Redistricted to the 25th district.
Joseph H. Shull (Stroudsburg)	Democrat	March 4, 1903 – March 3, 1905	58th		Elected in 1902. Unsuccessful candidate for renomination.
Gustav A. Schneebeli (Nazareth)	Republican	March 4, 1905 – March 3, 1907	59th		Elected in 1904. Unsuccessful candidate for reelection.
J. Davis Brodhead (South Bethlehem)	Democrat	March 4, 1907 – March 3, 1909	60th		Elected in 1906. Unsuccessful candidate for renomination.
A. Mitchell Palmer (Stroudsburg)	Democrat	March 4, 1909 – March 3, 1915	61st 62nd 63rd		Elected in 1908. Re-elected in 1910. Re-elected in 1912. Not a candidate for renomination
Henry J. Steele (Easton)	Democrat	March 4, 1915 – March 3, 1921	64th 65th 66th		Elected in 1914. Re-elected in 1916. Re-elected in 1918; Did not seek renomination.
William H. Kirkpatrick (Easton)	Republican	March 4, 1921 – March 3, 1923	67th		Elected in 1920. Unsuccessful candidate for reelection.
Thomas W. Phillips, Jr. (Butler)	Republican	March 4, 1923 – March 3, 1927	68th 69th		Elected in 1922. Re-elected in 1924. Did not seek renomination.
J. Howard Swick (Beaver Falls)	Republican	March 4, 1927 – January 3, 1935	70th 71st 72nd 73rd		Elected in 1926. Re-elected in 1928. Re-elected in 1930. Re-elected in 1932. Unsuccessful candidate for reelection.
Charles R. Eckert (Beaver)	Democrat	January 3, 1935 – January 3, 1939	74th 75th		Elected in 1934. Re-elected in 1936. Unsuccessful candidate for reelection.
Louis E. Graham (Beaver)	Republican	January 3, 1939 – January 3, 1945	76th 77th 78th		Elected in 1938. Re-elected in 1940. Re-elected in 1942. Redistricted to the 25th district.
Harve Tibbott (Ebensburg)	Republican	January 3, 1945 – January 3, 1949	79th 80th		Redistricted from the 27th district and re-elected in 1944. Re-elected in 1946. Unsuccessful candidate for reelection.
Robert L. Coffey (Johnstown)	Democratic	January 3, 1949 – April 20, 1949	81st		Elected in 1948. Died.
Vacant		April 20, 1949– September 13, 1949	81st		
John P. Saylor (Johnstown)	Republican	September 13, 1949 – January 3, 1953	81st 82nd		Elected to finish Coffey's term. Re-elected in 1950. Redistricted to the 22nd district.
Thomas E. Morgan (Fredericktown)	Democrat	January 3, 1953 – January 3, 1973	83rd 84th 85th 86th 87th 88th 89th 90th 91st 92nd		Redistricted from the 24th district and re-elected in 1952. Re-elected in 1954. Re-elected in 1956. Re-elected in 1958. Re-elected in 1960. Re-elected in 1962. Re-elected in 1964. Re-elected in 1966. Re-elected in 1968. Re-elected in 1970. Redistricted to the 22nd district.
District dissolved January 3, 1973
