= William Orlando Smith =

American politician (1859–1932)

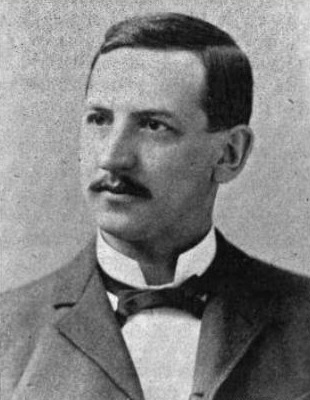

Member of the U.S. House of Representatives from Pennsylvania's 27th district
- In office March 4, 1903 – March 3, 1907
- Preceded by: Joseph Horace Shull
- Succeeded by: Joseph Grant Beale

Personal details
- Born: June 13, 1859 Reynoldsville, Pennsylvania, U.S.
- Died: May 12, 1932 (aged 72) Cleveland, Ohio, U.S.
- Party: Republican

William Orlando Smith (June 13, 1859 – May 12, 1932) was a U.S. representative from the state of Pennsylvania.

== Biography ==
Smith was born in Reynoldsville, Pennsylvania on June 13, 1859. He learned the printing trade, and worked as publisher of the Reynoldsville Herald from 1876 to 1879.

He worked in the Government Printing Office in Washington, D.C., from 1879 to 1884. He returned to Punxsutawney, Pennsylvania, in 1884 and successively edited the Punxsutawney Tribune and the Punxsutawney Spirit.

He was a member of the Pennsylvania House of Representatives from 1889 to 1898. He worked as editor of the Bradford Daily Era in Bradford, Pennsylvania in 1891. He purchased a half interest in the Punxsutawney Spirit in January 1892.

Smith was elected as a Republican to the Fifty-eighth and Fifty-ninth Congresses (1903 to 1907). He was not a candidate for renomination in 1906. After his time in Congress, he resumed his newspaper interests in Punxsutawney.

He died in Cleveland, Ohio on May 12, 1932. Interment was at Circle Hill Cemetery in Punxsutawney.

== Sources ==
=== Newspapers.com ===
- "Punxs'y Publisher Buried Last Sunday". The Jeffersonian-Democrat. Brookville, PA. May 19, 1932 – via Newspapers.com.

=== Books ===
- Rodearmel, William (1893). The State Departments and Members and Officers of the Legislature of Pennsylvania, 1893-94. Harrisburg, PA: E. K. Meyers Printing House.

U.S. House of Representatives
Preceded by Joseph H. Shull	Member of the U.S. House of Representatives from Pennsylvania's 27th congressional district 1903 - 1907	Succeeded by Joseph G. Beale
