= John C. Sturtevant =

American politician

John Cirby Sturtevant
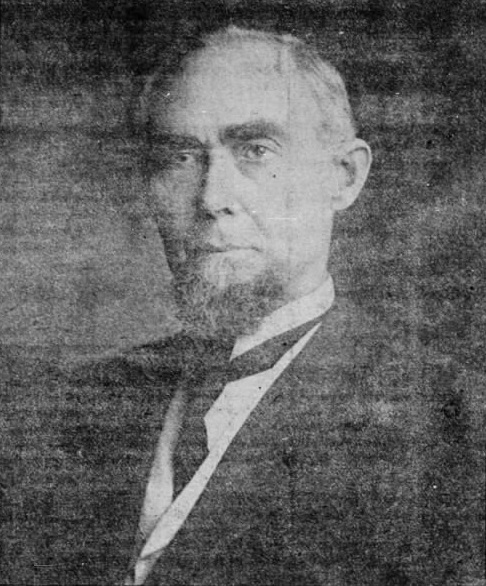
- The Conneautville Courier, February 23, 1910

Member of the U.S. House of Representatives from Pennsylvania's 28th district
- In office March 4, 1897 – March 3, 1899
- Preceded by: Matthew Griswold
- Succeeded by: Athelston Gaston

Personal details
- Born: February 20, 1835 Spring Township, Pennsylvania, U.S.
- Died: December 20, 1912 (aged 77) Conneautville, Pennsylvania, U.S.
- Party: Republican

John Cirby Sturtevant (February 20, 1835 – December 20, 1912) was a Republican member of the U.S. House of Representatives from Pennsylvania.

== Biography ==
John C. Sturtevant was born in Spring Township, Crawford County, Pennsylvania on February 20, 1835, and attended the common schools in his community before becoming a teacher and farmer.

He was an officer in the Pennsylvania State House of Representatives in Harrisburg, Pennsylvania, in 1861, 1862, and 1864, and a delegate to seven Republican State conventions from 1865 to 1890. A member of the State House of Representatives in 1865 and in 1866, he moved to Conneautville, Pennsylvania in 1867, where he engaged in the hardware business until 1873 and in manufacturing and milling until 1888. He also engaged in banking, serving as cashier and president of the First National Bank of Conneautville.

Sturtevant was elected as a Republican to the Fifty-fifth Congress. He was not a candidate for renomination in 1898. He then resumed his banking interests, and served as a delegate to the 1908 Republican National Convention.

== Death and interment ==
Sturtevant died in Conneautville on December 20, 1912, and was interred in the Conneautville Cemetery.

U.S. House of Representatives
Preceded by Matthew Griswold	Member of the U.S. House of Representatives from Pennsylvania's 26th congressional district 1897–1899	Succeeded by Athelston Gaston
