= Gustav A. Schneebeli =

American politician

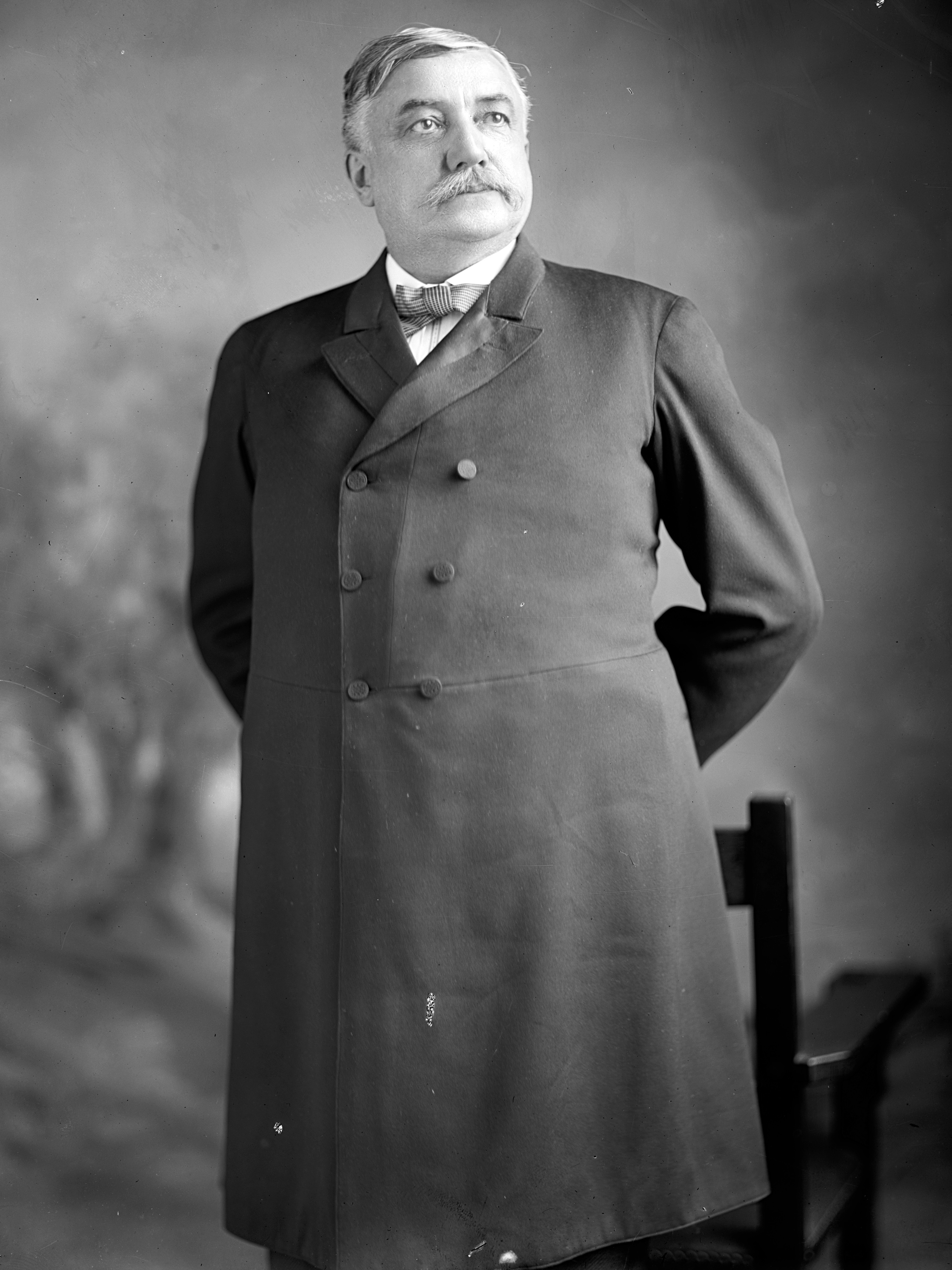

Member of the U.S. House of Representatives from Pennsylvania's 26th district
- In office March 4, 1905 – March 4, 1907
- Preceded by: Joseph H. Shull
- Succeeded by: J. Davis Brodhead

Personal details
- Born: Gustav Adolphus Schneebeli; May 23, 1853 Neusalz, Prussian Silesia
- Died: February 6, 1923 (aged 69) Nazareth, Pennsylvania, U.S.
- Resting place: Moravian Cemetery
- Party: Republican

Gustav Adolphus Schneebeli (May 23, 1853 – February 6, 1923) was an American businessman and politician who served one term as a U.S. representative from the state of Pennsylvania from 1905 to 1907.

== Biography ==
Schneebeli was born in Neusalz, Prussian Silesia. He immigrated to the United States with his parents, who settled in Bethlehem, Pennsylvania. He attended the Moravian Parochial School. They later moved to Nazareth, Pennsylvania, and entered upon a mercantile career.

=== Career ===
He founded the knit-goods industry of the Nazareth Waist Co. In 1888 he established a lace manufacturing company, of which he became sole owner.

=== Congress ===
Schneebeli was elected as a Republican to the 59th Congress. He was an unsuccessful candidate for reelection in 1906.

=== Later career and death ===
He continued in the lace manufacturing business until his death in Nazareth in 1923. Interment in Moravian Cemetery.

== Sources ==
- United States Congress. "Gustav A. Schneebeli (id: S000134)". Biographical Directory of the United States Congress.
- The Political Graveyard

U.S. House of Representatives
Preceded by Joseph H. Shull	Member of the U.S. House of Representatives from Pennsylvania's 26th congressional district 1905–1907	Succeeded by J. Davis Brodhead
