= John P. Saylor =

American politician

John Saylor

Member of the U.S. House of Representatives from Pennsylvania
- In office September 13, 1949 – October 28, 1973
- Preceded by: Robert Coffey
- Succeeded by: John Murtha
- Constituency: 26th district (1949–1953); 22nd district (1953–1973); 12th district (1973)

Personal details
- Born: John Phillips Saylor; July 23, 1908 Conemaugh Township, Somerset County, Pennsylvania, U.S.
- Died: October 28, 1973 (aged 65) Houston, Texas, U.S.
- Resting place: Grandview Cemetery; 40.31170°N 78.92580°W
- Party: Republican
- Spouse: Grace
- Children: 2
- Education: Franklin and Marshall College; Dickinson School of Law

John Phillips Saylor (July 23, 1908 – October 28, 1973) was an American lawyer and World War II veteran who served as a liberal Republican member of the U.S. House of Representatives from Pennsylvania serving from 1949 until his death from a heart attack in Houston, Texas in 1973.

== Background ==
Saylor was born in Conemaugh Township, Somerset County, Pennsylvania. He graduated from Franklin and Marshall College in Lancaster, Pennsylvania, in 1929, and Dickinson School of Law in Carlisle, Pennsylvania in 1933. He was elected city solicitor of Johnstown, Pennsylvania, in 1938 and served until 1940.

=== World War II ===
He enlisted in the United States Navy on August 6, 1943 and served until January 1946.

== Political career ==
Saylor was elected as a Republican to the 81st Congress, by special election, September 13, 1949, to fill the vacancy caused by the death of Robert L. Coffey. He was reelected to the twelve succeeding Congresses and served until his death in Houston, Texas. During his time in Congress he became dedicated to a number of environmental causes, including the Wilderness Act of 1964, the Ozark National Scenic Riverways Act, National Wild and Scenic Rivers Act and in opposition to the Kinzua Dam Project. He was dubbed "St. John" by environmental advocates for his dogged work on environmental issues.

In 1970 the Izaak Walton League of America bestowed its highest honor, the Founders' Award, to Saylor "for two decades of unprecedented leadership in the Congress of the United States for sound resource management, the preservation of natural scenic and cultural values, the maintenance of a quality environment, and the unalienable right of citizens to be involved in resources and environmental decisions."

Saylor voted in favor of the Civil Rights Acts of 1957, 1960, 1964, and 1968, as well as the 24th Amendment to the U.S. Constitution and the Voting Rights Act of 1965.

== Personal life and death ==
Saylor and his wife, Grace, had two children.

On October 24, 1973, Saylor had surgery for an aortic aneurysm at St. Luke's Episcopal Hospital in Houston. While the operation was reported to be a success, he had a heart attack in his hospital room shortly after midnight on October 28 and died at the age of 65. He is buried in Grandview Cemetery, Johnstown, Pennsylvania. The John P. Saylor Trail in Gallitzin State Forest is named after him.

== See also ==
- List of members of the United States Congress who died in office (1950–1999)

== Sources ==
- United States Congress. "John Phillips Saylor (id: S000102)". Biographical Directory of the United States Congress.
- Voice of Wild and Scenic Rivers: John P. Saylor of Pennsylvania (full text here)

== Notes ==
U.S. House of Representatives
Preceded by Irving Whalley	Member of the U.S. House of Representatives from Pennsylvania's 12th congressional district 1973	Succeeded by John Murtha
Preceded by James Van Zandt	Member of the U.S. House of Representatives from Pennsylvania's 22nd congressional district 1953–1973	Succeeded by Thomas Morgan
Preceded by Robert Coffey	Member of the U.S. House of Representatives from Pennsylvania's 26th congressional district 1949–1953	Succeeded by Thomas Morgan
