= Joseph H. Shull =

American politician

Joseph Horace Shull
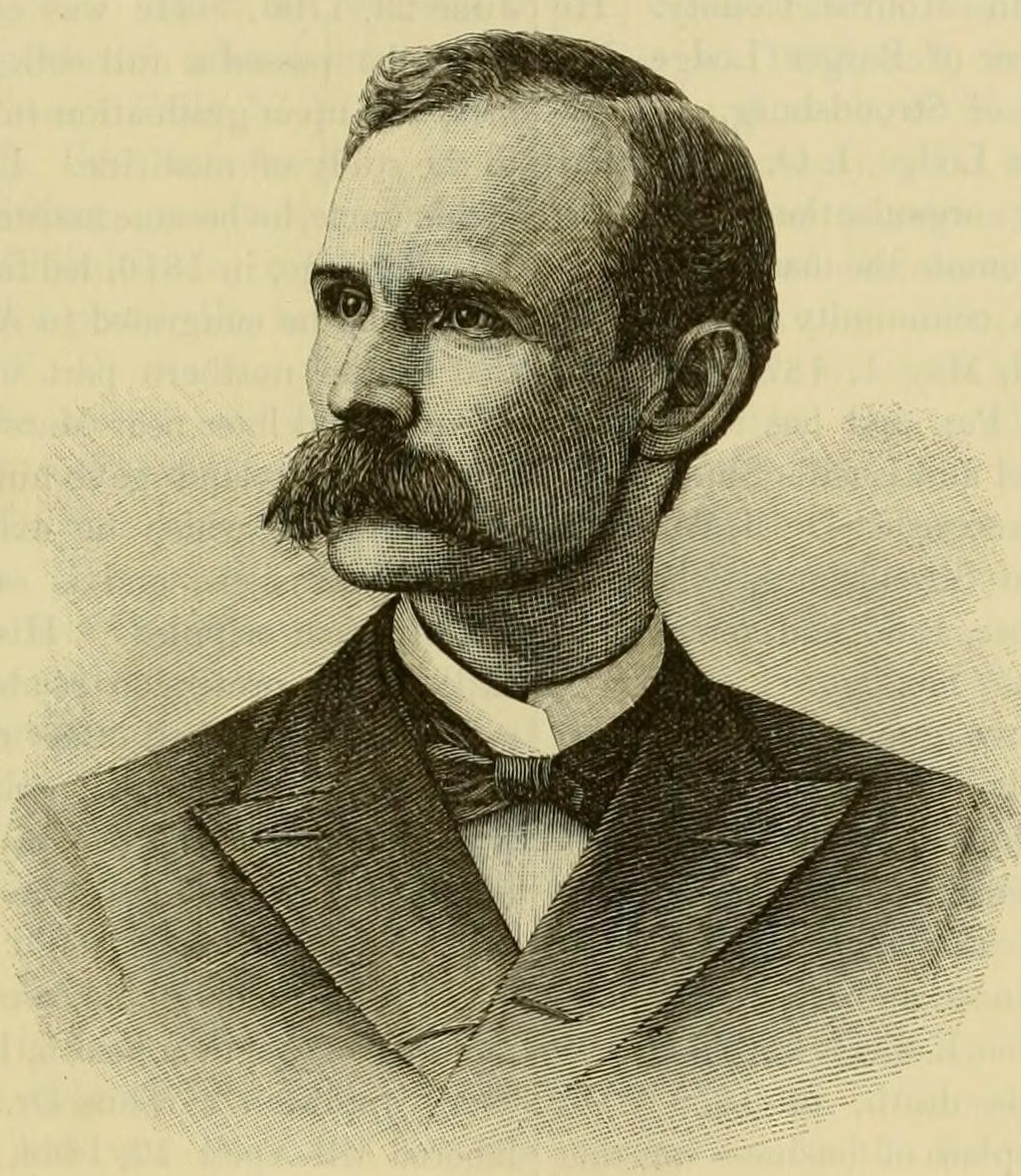
- From 1886's History of Wayne, Pike and Monroe Counties, Pennsylvania

Member of the U.S. House of Representatives from Pennsylvania's 26th district
- In office March 4, 1903 – March 3, 1905
- Preceded by: Arthur L. Bates
- Succeeded by: Gustav A. Schneebeli

Member of the Pennsylvania Senate for the 22nd district
- In office 1886–1891
- Preceded by: John D. Biddis
- Succeeded by: William M. Rapsher

Personal details
- Born: August 17, 1848 Martins Creek, Pennsylvania, U.S.
- Died: August 9, 1944 (aged 95) Stroudsburg, Pennsylvania, U.S.
- Party: Democratic

Joseph Horace Shull (August 17, 1848 – August 9, 1944) was an American lawyer, physician and politician from Pennsylvania who served as a Democratic member of the U.S. House of Representatives for Pennsylvania's 26th congressional district from 1903 to 1905. He also served as a member of the Pennsylvania Senate for the 22nd district from 1886 to 1891.

== Early life and education ==
Shull was born at Martins Creek, Pennsylvania to Elias and Margaret Eakin Shull. He attended the public schools and Blair Academy in Blairstown, New Jersey. He took a special course at Lafayette College in Easton, Pennsylvania. He graduated from the University of New York and in 1873 from the Bellevue Hospital Medical College, both in New York City. He taught in the public schools of Pennsylvania for four years. He studied law, was admitted to the bar in 1879 and commenced practice in Stroudsburg, Pennsylvania.

== Career ==
He was the first president of the Monroe County bar association and worked as editor of the Monroe Democrat from 1881 to 1886. He was a member of the Pennsylvania State Senate for the 22nd district from 1886 to 1891.

Shull was elected as a Democrat to the Fifty-eighth Congress. He was an unsuccessful candidate for renomination in 1904. He resumed the practice of law and medicine, and worked as president of the Delaware Valley railroad company. He served as a contract surgeon during the First World War.

On May 22, 1944, he (95 years old) and his son, Judge Samuel Shull, were admitted to the bar of the United States Supreme Court. Though neither argued before the court, he is believed to be the oldest person admitted to that bar.

== Death ==
Shull died in Stroudsburg in August 1944.

== Footnotes ==
Pennsylvania State Senate
Preceded by John D. Biddis	Member of the Pennsylvania Senate, 22nd district 1886-1891	Succeeded by William M. Rapsher
U.S. House of Representatives
Preceded by Arthur L. Bates	Member of the U.S. House of Representatives from Pennsylvania's 26th congressional district 1903–1905	Succeeded by Gustav A. Schneebeli
