= Jamestown and Franklin Railroad =

Overview
- Headquarters: Sheakleyville, Pennsylvania, U.S.
- Locale: Pennsylvania and Ohio, U.S.
- Dates of operation: April 5, 1862–January 26, 1909
- Successor: Jamestown, Franklin and Clearfield Railroad

Technical
- Track gauge: Standard
- Length: 51.1 miles (82.2 km)

The Jamestown and Franklin Railroad (J&F) was a shortline railroad which operated in the U.S. states of Ohio and Pennsylvania. Established in 1862, its main line ran from Jamestown, Pennsylvania, to Oil City, Pennsylvania. A branch line connected Jamestown with Ashtabula, Ohio. The railroad leased itself to the Lake Shore and Michigan Southern Railway in 1864 for 20 years. A 1909 consolidation with three other railroads created the Jamestown, Franklin and Clearfield Railroad, and ended the J&F's existence.

== Founding and charter ==
In 1862, George A. Bittenbender, William Gibson, (Note: Gibson was president of the Pittsburgh and Erie Railroad, incorporated under state charter in 1846. An extensive amount of construction occurred, but the line ran out of money and it never opened. Part of the finished line ran between Jamestown and the village of Sugar Creek (now Osgood, Pennsylvania).) David Hadley, Henry C. Hickok, A. W. Raymond, William Lawrence Scott, and John P. Vincent—all northwestern Pennsylvania businessmen—sought a charter for a shortline railroad in northwestern Pennsylvania. Their goal was to connect the Erie and Pittsburgh Railroad, which had a station in Jamestown, with the oil fields about 25 miles (40 km) to the east-southeast. The Jamestown and Franklin Railroad (J&F) was chartered under an act passed by the Pennsylvania General Assembly on April 5, 1862. It was permitted to build its line from Jamestown in Mercer County, Pennsylvania (about 2 miles (3.2 km) east of the Ohio-Pennsylvania border) to Oil City in Venango County, Pennsylvania. The company had the right to build branches to connect its road to any other railroad nearby, and to purchase any unfinished railroad in either county and complete it. On March 9, 1863, the state legislature amended the company's charter to permit it to purchase up to 5,000 acres (20,000,000 m^{2}) of land adjacent to its line. These purchases could include mineral rights, and the railroad was permitted to open mines or drill for oil. Additionally, the firm's branch lines were limited to just 10 miles (16 km) each.

On April 19, 1864, the charter was amended by the legislature a third time, to permit construction of either a narrow-gauge or standard-gauge branch south of Oil City into Cranberry Township in Venango County.

== Construction of the line ==
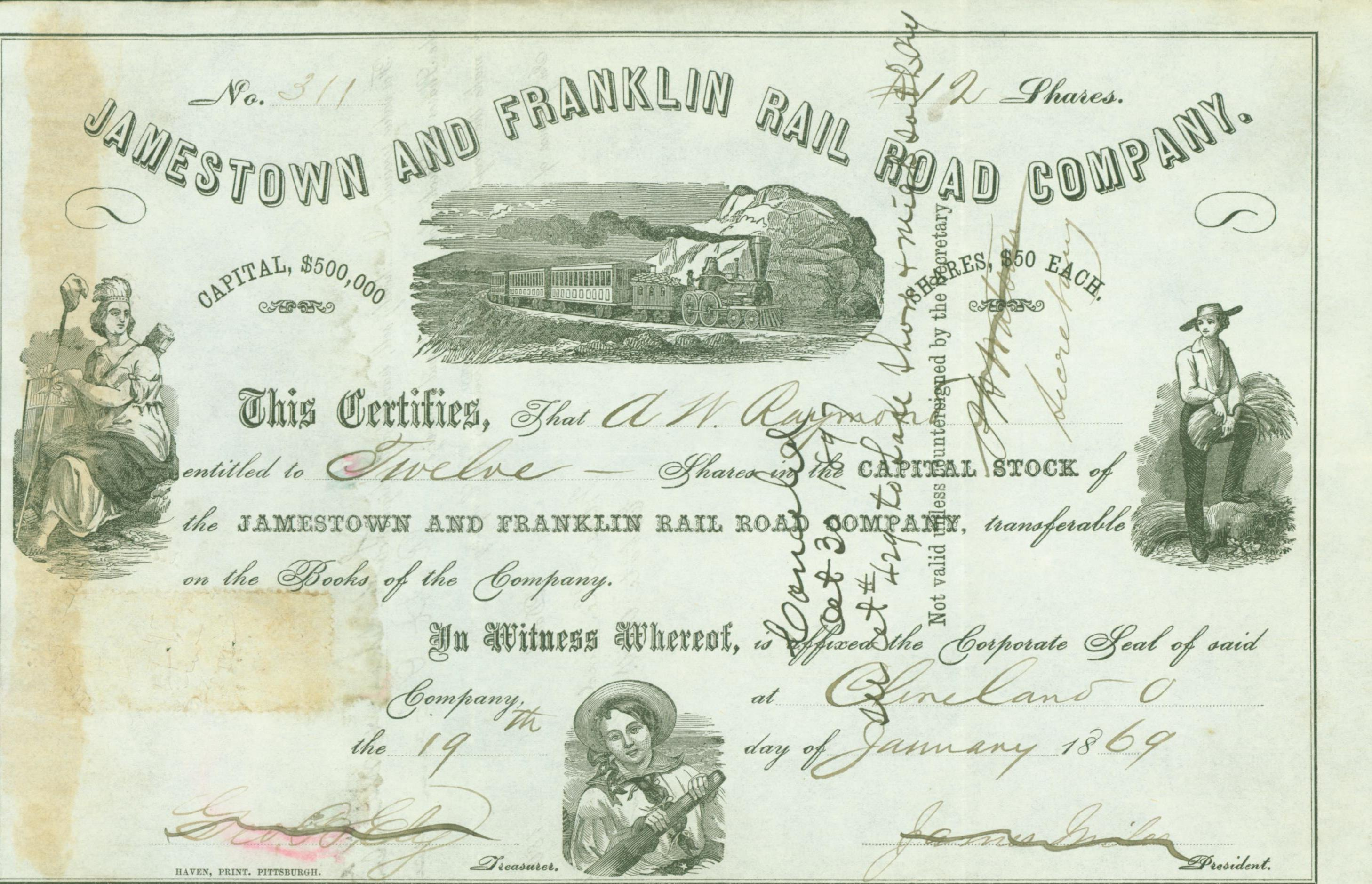
Share of the Jamestown and Franklin Rail Road Company, issued 19. January 1869

The railroad was headquartered in Sheakleyville, a small town located about midpoint on the road's main line.

Construction began in Jamestown in 1864. By this time, major investors in the railroad also included George Palmer, president of the Buffalo and State Line Railroad, and Amasa Stone, a director of the Cleveland, Painesville and Ashtabula Railroad (CP&A). William Gibson, the J&F's president, gave to the J&F (in exchange for more of the railroad's stock) the right of way and finished track of the bankrupt Pittsburgh and Erie Railroad between Jamestown and the village of Sugar Creek.

On March 21, 1864, the CP&A leased the entirety of the J&F for 20 years. The cost of the lease was 40 percent of the J&F's annual earnings. (Note: The 1881 report of the Ohio Commissioner of Railroads and Telegraphs says the LS&MS leased the J&F. But the LS&MS did not exist until 1869. The report conflates the LS&MS with the CP&A for convenience's sake.) The CP&A now began loaning the J&F extensive funds, allowing the smaller railroad to rapidly expand. By August 1865, the J&F had taken possession of or laid 21 miles (34 km) of track and reached the village of Stoneboro, Pennsylvania, location of the Mercer Iron and Coal Company's coal mines. (These mines were leased and operated by Stone's CP&A.) Shortly thereafter, the J&F leased trackage rights on the Erie and Pittsburgh Railroad (owned by William Lawrence Scott) and began running trains between Jamestown and Girard, Pennsylvania (a town about 10 miles (16 km) southwest of Erie on the shore of Lake Erie).

By the summer of 1867, the track had gone another mile east and reached Franklin, Pennsylvania, just to the west of Oil City. Trains began running into Franklin on June 27, three days after completion of the road.

In 1869, work began on the road between Franklin and Oil City. The J&F contracted with an excavating company to make hillside cuts and grade the line. But this firm's work proved unsatisfactory, and it was fired. A second company was hired. Their work was much improved, and the line went forward. To reach its destination, however, the railroad had to bridge French Creek, which it finally did in January 1870. The road was completed in 1870, and the first train ran to Oil City on May 24, 1870.

In the spring of 1869, the CP&A consolidated with the Cleveland and Toledo Railroad and the Michigan Southern and Northern Indiana Railroad to create the Lake Shore and Michigan Southern Railway (LS&MS).

Construction now began on a branch line between Jamestown and Ashtabula, Ohio, to connect the J&F with the LS&MS. Sources differ as to which company conducted this work. Historian Charles A. Babcock says in passing that it was the J&F, but historian Thomas W. Sanderson provides extensive evidence that it was the CP&A. Sanderson notes that CP&A stockholders approved the branch in 1863, and work was begun in 1864. After a great deal of the line was built, it was abandoned for reasons which remain unclear. Work began again in 1871, and the branch was completed in August 1872. The 31 miles (50 km) from Ashtabula to the Pennsylvania state line were constructed under the CP&A's charter, while the 5 miles (8.0 km) from the Ohio-Pennsylvania border to Jamestown were constructed under the charter of the Central Trunk Railroad (a never-built railroad whose charter was held by William Gibson). Completion of the line markedly reduced traffic from Jamestown to Girard. Most of this traffic was headed west, and now traveled over the Ashtabula Branch to reach the LS&MS.

The railroad's total length was now 51.1 miles (82.2 km).

== Ownership changes ==
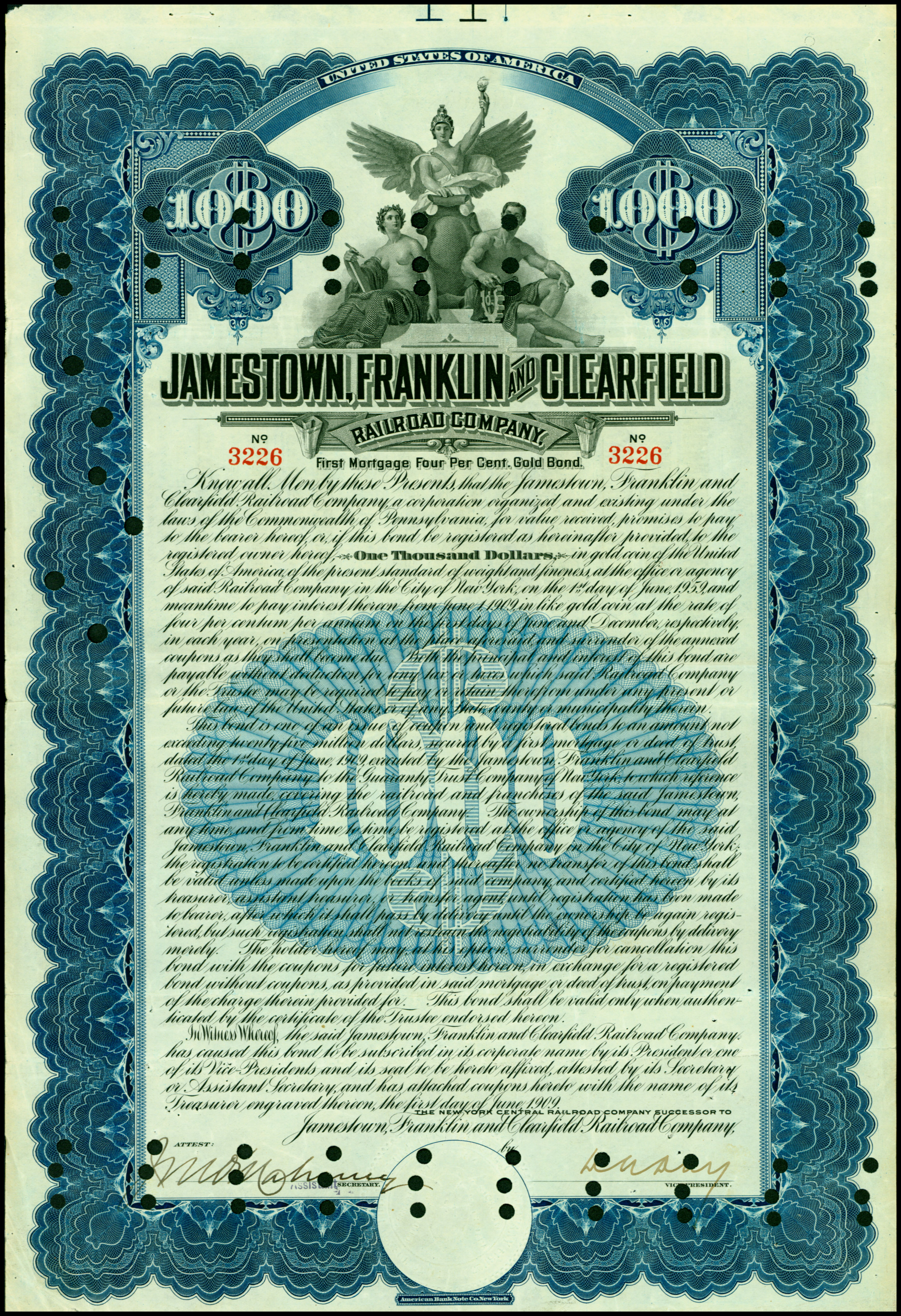
Gold Bond of the Jamestown, Franklin and Clearfield Railroad Company, issued 1. June 1909

On January 26, 1909, the J&F, the Central Trunk Railroad, the Franklin and Clearfield Railroad, and the Jackson Coal Railroad consolidated to create the Jamestown, Franklin and Clearfield Railroad. When the consolidation was complete, the LS&MS purchased 2,535 shares of stock of the company in exchange for forgiving a portion of the debt it had incurred in building the lines of these roads.

The New York Central and Hudson River Railroad acquired a controlling majority in the LS&MS in 1877. In 1914, an asset restructuring and refinancing of the New York Central led to the abolishment of all subsidiary corporations and their consolidation into a new New York Central Railroad. On April 7, 1915, the New York Central (NYC) purchased the Jamestown, Franklin and Clearfield Railroad in a debt-for-ownership exchange. The NYC then abolished the separate corporate existence of the Jamestown, Franklin and Clearfield Railroad.

== Bibliography ==
- Babcock, Charles A. (1919). Venango County, Pennsylvania: Her Pioneers and People, Embracing a General History of the County. Vol. 1. Chicago: J.H. Beers.
- Benton, Sarah Ann (2015). Franklin. Charleston, S.C.: Arcadia Publishing. ISBN 9781467123068.
- Leavy, Michael (2006). The New York Central System. Charleston, S.C.: Arcadia Publishing. ISBN 9780738549286.
- Ohio Commissioner of Railroads and Telegraphs (1881). Annual Report of the Commissioner of Railroads and Telegraphs of Ohio for the Year Ending June 30, 1880. Columbus, Ohio: G.J. Brand & Co., State Printers. hdl:2027/uc1.b2896935.
- Poor's Intermediate Manual of Railroads for 1917. New York: Poor's Manual Company. 1917.
- Sanderson, Thomas W. (1907). 20th Century History of Youngstown and Mahoning County, Ohio, and Representative Citizens. Chicago: Biographical Pub. Co.
