= Cleveland, Painesville and Ashtabula Railroad (1848–1869) =

19th-century American railroad

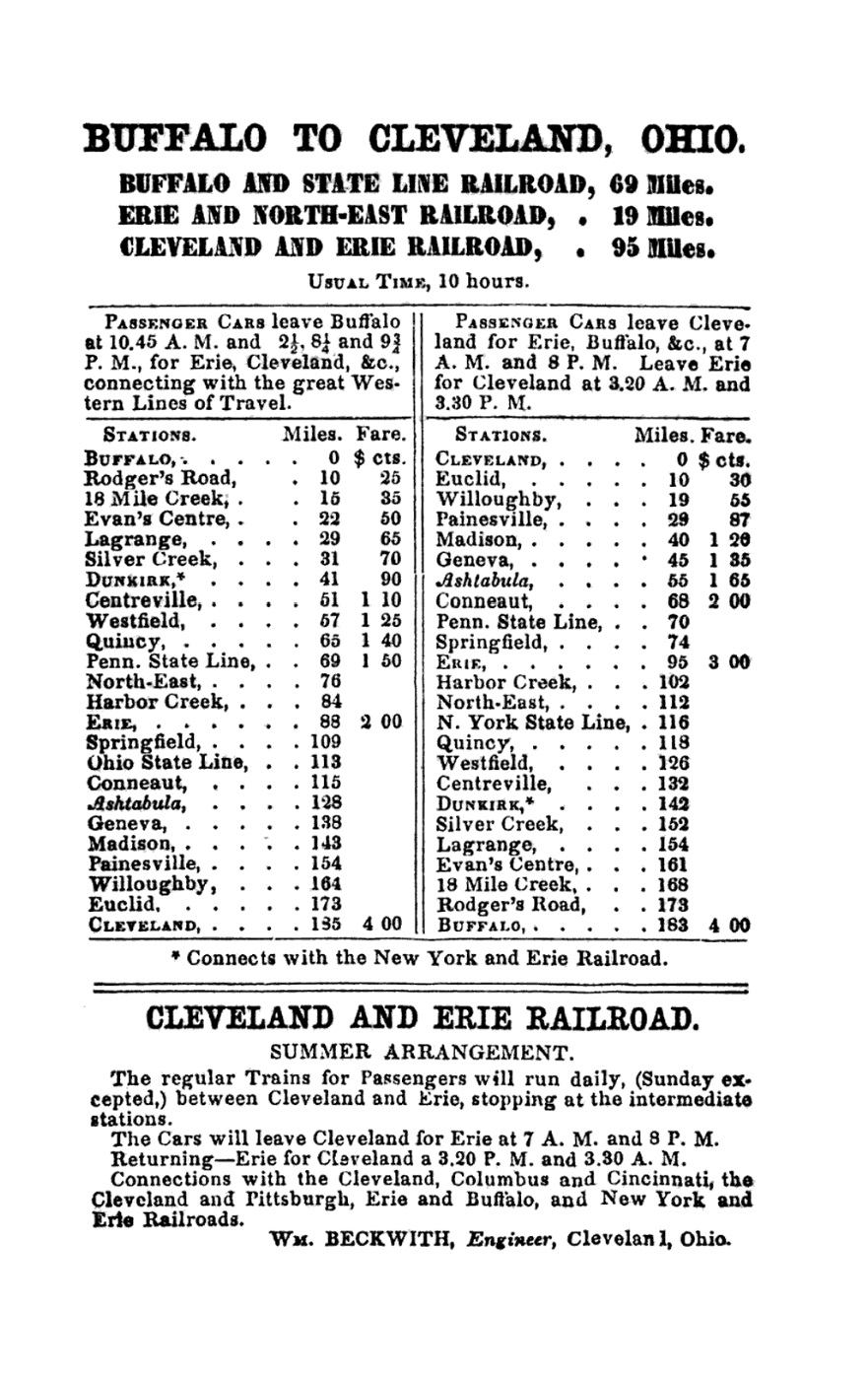
- A CP&A timetable from 1853

Overview
- Headquarters: Cleveland, Ohio, U.S.
- Dates of operation: February 18, 1848–April 6, 1869
- Successor: Lake Shore and Michigan Southern Railway

Technical
- Track gauge: 4 ft 10 in (1,473 mm)
- Length: 71 miles (114 km) (1851); 95.5 miles (153.7 km) (after 1854); 343.2 miles (552.3 km) (after 1867)

The Cleveland, Painesville and Ashtabula Railroad (CP&A), also known informally as the Cleveland and Erie Railroad, the Cleveland and Buffalo Railroad, and the Lake Shore Railroad, was a railway which ran from Cleveland, Ohio, to the Ohio–Pennsylvania border. Founded in 1848, the line opened in 1852. The railroad completed the rail link between Buffalo, New York, and Chicago, Illinois.

The CP&A connected at the state line with the Franklin Canal Company (FCC), a Pennsylvania company. The FCC and CP&A shared the same track gauge, and the CP&A operated both rail lines. At Erie, Pennsylvania, the FCC connected with the Erie and North East Railroad. The Erie Gauge War of late 1853 to early 1854 occurred when the Erie & North East, a broad-gauge railway, changed its gauge to match that of the CP&A. The resolution to the conflict led to the CP&A purchasing the FCC outright.

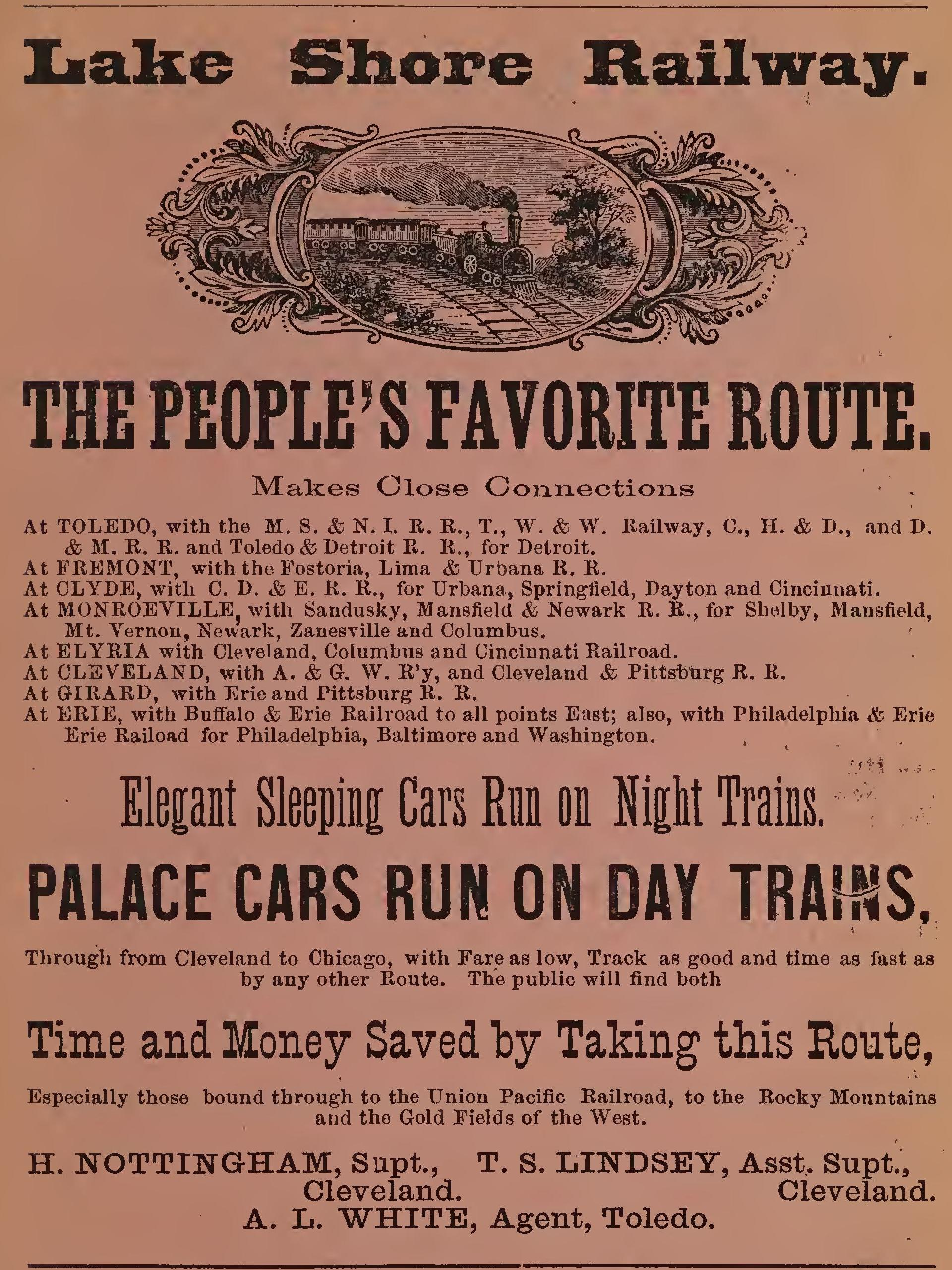
"Lake Shore Railway" 1868 ad from Scott's Annual Toledo City Directory

One of the most profitable railroad lines in the United States in the 1860s, the CP&A was renamed the Lake Shore Railway in 1868. It merged with the Michigan Southern and Northern Indiana Railroad in 1869 to form the Lake Shore and Michigan Southern Railroad.

== Building railroads along the Great Lakes shoreline ==
The Erie Canal, linking New York City with Buffalo, New York, (via Albany and the Hudson River) opened in 1825 and proved to be a financial boon to merchants in New York City. The canal also gave cities on the Great Lakes a transportation cost advantage equal to that of cities on the Ohio River (then the major east–west transportation route for both goods and people west of the Appalachians). Encouraged by the canal's success, railroads began rapid construction in interior regions to link isolated markets to the canals and to other railroads.

The first important step in the development of rail transportation along the Great Lakes came in 1832 when the Michigan Territory chartered the Erie and Kalamazoo Railroad to run from Port Lawrence (now the city of Toledo, Ohio) to Adrian, Michigan, with the goal of giving agricultural and timber producers in the Michigan interior access to Lake Erie ports. Horse-drawn trains first ran on the line in November 1836, with steam locomotives taking over the following year. Citizens of Sandusky and Elyria in Ohio now determined to link their cities with Toledo and Cleveland. The Junction Railroad, chartered in 1846, proposed an inland route through Millbury, Fremont, Norwalk, and Grafton, with trackage rights over an existing railroad between Grafton and Cleveland. (Note: Almost no work on the Junction Railroad occurred between 1846 and 1850. The state of Ohio chartered another railroad, the Toledo, Norwalk and Cleveland, to build along the same route. Junction Railroad officials decided to alter their road to a shoreline route through Oak Harbor, Port Clinton, Danbury, Sandusky, Vermilion, and Lorain. Unable to win amendments to their charter, the Junction Railroad instead chartered a subsidiary, the Port Clinton Railroad, in 1850 and built the shoreline route under the subsidiary's name. The Toledo, Norwalk, & Cleveland opened in January 1853, and the Port Clinton in July 1853.)

A second important step came in 1842. The Erie and North East Railroad (E&NE) was chartered by the state of Pennsylvania to build a line from Erie, Pennsylvania, northeast to the Pennsylvania–New York border, where it would connect with rail lines being built from Buffalo. (Note: The project had been proposed at a meeting of business leaders from Erie and Fredonia, New York, in 1831, but no action was taken until 1842.) It was not until 1846, however, that the Dunkirk and State Line Railroad agreed to connect with the Pennsylvania road. Only then was stock in the Erie & North East sold.

To complete the line between Buffalo and western Michigan, only two short rail links remained to be completed: Between Erie and the Pennsylvania–Ohio border, and between the Pennsylvania–Ohio border and Cleveland.

== Obtaining a charter ==
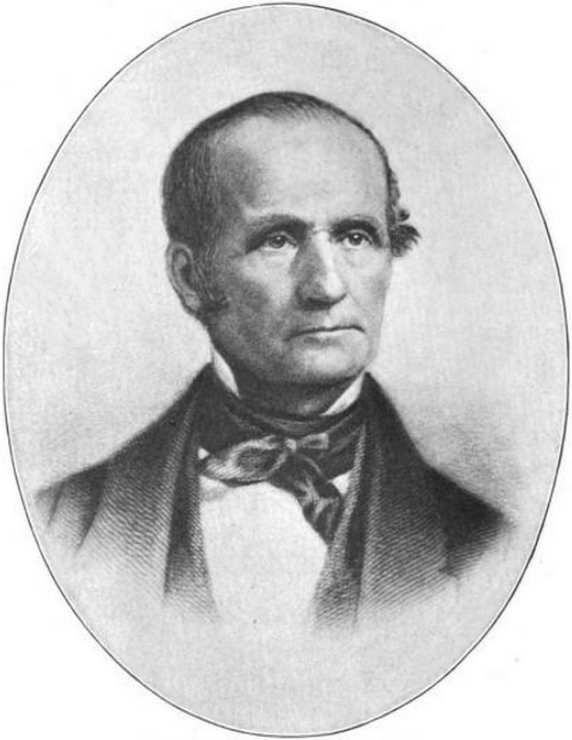
Alfred Kelley, the director of the CP&A who located the railroad's route

Cleveland had emerged as one of the largest and fastest-growing cities in Ohio due to its transportation links (the Ohio and Erie Canal and its Lake Erie steamship port). Railroads were seen by Cleveland business and civic leaders as critical to the city's future. They could reach deep into agricultural and mining country far more easily than canals, and move much greater quantities of goods than wagons. Railroads would not only allow these goods to reach Erie and Buffalo (the traditional transshipment ports for Ohio products) faster and more easily, but also give Ohio producers direct access to large, rich seaboard cities like New York, Boston, Philadelphia, and Baltimore. With Ohio underdeveloped and starved for capital, Clevelanders and other Ohioans saw railroads as the means to opening new markets and bringing capital into the state.

Alfred Kelley, a Cleveland lawyer, had been elected the first mayor of the newly incorporated Village of Cleveland in 1815. As a member of the Ohio General Assembly, he championed the construction of canals, and as the first Canal Commissioner oversaw the construction of the Ohio and Erie Canal. Known as the "father of the Ohio and Erie Canal", Kelley was one of the most dominant commercial, financial, and political people in the state of Ohio in the first half of the 1800s. In August 1847, the officers of the nascent Cleveland, Columbus and Cincinnati Railroad (CCC) asked Kelley to oversee construction of their new road. Kelley agreed, and the line from Cleveland to Columbus and Cincinnati was completed in February 1851. (Note: This railroad had been chartered by the state in 1836, but no work was undertaken and the charter lapsed. The charter was revived in 1845. So little capital was raised that the backers sought out Kelley specifically. Due to the successful completion of the Ohio & Erie Canal, he had a reputation as an efficient and budget-conscious construction supervisor. Kelley's reputation increased confidence in the company, and investors poured money into the railroad.)

With completion of the CCC, rail lines extended west and south of Cleveland—but not east to the all-important seaboard markets. Since 1831, different coalitions of Cleveland businessmen had tried to organize a railroad to connect Cleveland with points east, but none of these efforts got off the ground. In 1847, a group of businessmen from Ashtabula, Cuyahoga, and Lake counties undertook a successful effort to build Cleveland's railroad link to the east. The group included John W. Allen, (Note: Allen was a prominent Cleveland banker and president of the CCC.) Sergeant Currier, Charles Hickox, (Note: Hickox owned several large flour mills in the greater Cleveland area, and was a prominent banker who co-founded the Society for Savings bank.) and John B. Waring of Cuyahoga County; William W. Branch, O.A. Crary, David R. Paige, (Note: Paige was a prominent merchant and later a county judge.) Peleg Phelps Sanford, (Note: Sanford owned iron mines and manufactured iron goods.) Lord Sterling, (Note: Sterling was a prominent judge and politician in Lake County.) Aaron Wilcox, (Note: Wilcox was a prominent dry goods and hardware merchant who founded several banks.) and Eli T. Wilder (Note: Wilder was an attorney and later presiding judge of the Geauga County courts.) of Lake County; and Frederick Carlisle, (Note: Carlisle was a banker in Ashtabula County.) George G. Gillett, Edwin Harmon, (Note: Harmon was a farmer and owner of large amounts of land in Ashtabula County.) Zaphna Lake, Robert Lyon, (Note: Lyon was owner of the largest dry goods and hardware store in the city of Conneaut, Ohio.) and Asaph Turner of Ashtabula County. The Cuyahoga County representatives took the lead, and on February 18, 1848, they received a state charter for the Cleveland, Painesville and Ashtabula Railroad (CP&A) to build a rail line from Cleveland to some point on the Ohio–Pennsylvania border.

The CP&A had a number of nicknames, and was also known informally as the "Cleveland and Erie Railroad", the "Cleveland and Buffalo Railroad", and the "Lake Shore Railroad".

== Ohio construction ==
By the end of July 1849, $50,000 ($1,900,000 in 2025 dollars) in stock had been sold by the CP&A's incorporators. The stockholders met for the first time on August 1, 1849, and elected Herman B. Ely, George G. Gillett, Alfred Kelley, Tappan Lake, David R. Paige, Peleg P. Sanford, and Samuel L. Selden to the initial board of directors. Kelley was elected president, but due to pressing business had to temporarily step aside. Herman Ely was named acting president until such time as Kelley could take up his duties.

=== Ohio route ===
Frederick Harbach, a surveyor and engineer for several Ohio railroads, surveyed the route for the CP&A in late 1849 and early 1850. In his report, issued at end of March 1850, Harbach proposed two routes. The "South Route" began at the City Station of the CCC on Station Street (an area south of what is now the intersection of Superior Avenue and W. 9th Street). It followed the towpath of the Ohio & Erie Canal south to Kingsbury Run, then moved inland along the stream, following it northeast and east to Euclid Creek. The route then turned north-northeast to Willoughby, where it crossed the Chagrin River. Past the river, the proposed route followed a fairly straight line along the lakeshore to the Ohio–Pennsylvania state border. The "North Route" began at the "Outer Station" of the Cleveland and Pittsburgh Railroad (on E. 33rd Street between Lakeside and Hamilton Avenues) and followed a relatively straight route along the lake to Euclid Creek and Willoughby. Staying close to the shoreline, it passed 0.66 miles (1.06 km) north of Painesville. The proposed route ran parallel to and north of the South Route at a distance of about 1.5 miles (2.4 km) until reaching the Ohio–Pennsylvania state border.

Alfred Kelley reviewed both proposed routes, and chose the North Route. In part, this route was chosen because, east of Cleveland, it ran atop an ancient beach ridge (formed when Lake Erie was much larger) that required little ballasting, was naturally well-drained, and required almost no blasting or earth moving. It was also essentially a level grade for almost its entire length, (Note: Grade is defined as feet per mile. Thus, a rise of 53 feet (16 m) per 1 mile (1.6 km) is a grade of 1 percent. A 1 percent grade is generally considered the maximum for the heaviest and longest trains. Main line grades of 2.1 percent may be permitted in very mountainous areas, but will require shorter trains, the use of several additional locomotives, and perhaps the uncoupling of some cars. Branch lines, feeder lines, and industrial lines may have grades as high as 4 percent, although only for short stretches of road.) with a ruling gradient of just 0.3 percent.

=== Building the Ohio road ===
Harbach's 1850 report estimated that building the road would cost $488,963 ($18,900,000 in 2025 dollars), of which $341,295 ($13,200,000 in 2025 dollars) would be needed for earthwork, grading, and the construction of masonry bridges. Another $6,600 ($200,000 in 2025 dollars) per mile would be needed for ties and rails. Initial rolling stock, which included four locomotives, was estimated to cost $145,425 ($5,600,000 in 2025 dollars). Harbach suggested the construction of 13 passenger and freight stations in Ohio at a total cost of $39,700 ($1,500,000 in 2025 dollars): Doan's Corners (located roughly at the modern intersection of Euclid Avenue and E. 105th Street), East Cleveland, Willoughby, Mentor, Painesville, Perry, Centerville, Unionville, Geneva, Ashtabula, Kingsville, West Conneaut, and Conneaut.

To construct the road, the CP&A turned to the firm of Harbach, Stone & Witt. Frederick Harbach, Amasa Stone, and Stillman Witt were all personally well known to Alfred Kelley, (Note: Witt (a railroad engineer) and Stone had worked with Harbach while building railroads in New England. Kelley also knew Stone well from Stone's work building bridges for railroads in the northeast.) and the firm was engaged in the construction of Kelley's Cleveland, Columbus & Cincinnati Railroad. (Note: The three men formed Harbach, Stone, & Witt in late 1848 at Kelley's request, and successfully bid on the CCC contract.) With the CCC nearing completion (it opened in February 1851) the CP&A awarded a contract to Harbach, Stone & Witt on July 26, 1850, to build its 71-mile (114 km) line.

Construction on the CP&A began in January 1851. Due to the almost flat and obstacle-free route, grading proceeded very swiftly. By the end of the month, grading had reached Willoughby and a construction team was already at work in Painesville building a bridge over the Grand River. The bridge at Willoughby was completed in August, piers for the bridge in Ashtabula were under construction, and grading had proceeded past that city. The bridge at Painesville, begun May 26, was completed on October 6. (Note: The highest and longest bridge on the line, this stone structure was 795 feet (242 m) long. Its piers were 60 feet (18 m) high, and its abutments 80 feet (24 m) above the water.)

Ten months after construction began, the entire right of way to the Ohio–Pennsylvania border had been purchased, two-thirds (60 miles (97 km)) of the road had been graded (to Ashtabula and slightly beyond), and all bridges completed except for the bridge over Conneaut Creek. (Note: This included a wooden Howe truss bridge at Ashtabula over the Ashtabula River. The Ashtabula span was replaced by an iron Howe truss bridge which famously failed on December 29, 1876, leading to the deaths of 92 people.) For the track, the company purchased 65-pound (29 kg) T rails manufactured in the United Kingdom. Each rail was 12 to 18 feet (3.7 to 5.5 m) in length, and joined by a cast iron chair joint. (Note: A chair joint is an early type of railroad joint, designed to hold one piece of rail against the other. It is shaped like a capital letter "C", lying on its back. The simplest chair joints were pounded into place against the rails, with more complex chair joints using bolts, spikes, and wedges to hold the joint against the rail.) Ballast was not initially laid, although the unstable nature of the clay beneath the track bed later required it. White oak ties were used to anchor the track.

Route grading to Conneaut was completed on November 15, and a wooden Howe truss bridge built over Conneaut Creek to give access to the state border. Regular trains began running on a 30-mile stretch between Cleveland and Painesville on November 20, 1851. The first trains from Cleveland to Ashtabula ran on June 16, 1852, and the first train between Ashtabula and Erie ran on November 23, 1852.

== Pennsylvania construction ==
The CP&A did not have the legal authority to build a railroad in Pennsylvania. Until the late 1800s, states strictly controlled railroad development by requiring the issuance of charters by their legislatures, and they generally refused to give "foreign" (out-of-state) railroads permission to own or construct railroads within their borders. Moreover, the Pennsylvania state legislature prohibited the construction of railroads across the Erie Triangle, effectively blocking both New York and Ohio railroads from crossing the state there. (Note: This encouraged New York railroads to build south along the Atlantic Ocean seaboard to Philadelphia, and then across the state to Pittsburgh before heading west. This prevented the New York lines from bypassing the state's industrial heartland.)

The CP&A soon discovered a way around this legal obstacle. (Note: Railroad historian Anthony Churella says it was the CP&A's New York City-based financial backers who realized the value of the FCC's charter. Kelley biographer James L. Bates and Cleveland historian Harland Hatcher both claim it was Alfred Kelley who did so.) In April 1844, the Pennsylvania General Assembly had enacted legislation incorporating the Franklin Canal Company (FCC) and permitted the company to take ownership of the Franklin Division of the Pennsylvania Canal between the French Creek feeder aqueduct at Meadville and the mouth of French Creek at Franklin. The company discovered that the canal would never become profitable, and petitioned the state to expand its charter. The state legislature did so in April 1849, permitting the FCC to build a railroad along the Franklin Division canal towpath and to extend this railroad line north to Lake Erie and south to Pittsburgh (where it could connect with other railroads). Two months later, the FCC concluded that the connection clause in its charter permitted it to expand westward as well. The company established a subsidiary (the "Erie and Cleveland Railroad") to build and operate this 25.5 miles (41.0 km) line.

=== Pennsylvania route ===
On July 5, 1849, the FCC issued $500,000 ($19,400,000 in 2025 dollars) in stock, with the CP&A purchasing $448,500 of it. The FCC also sold $67,500 ($2,600,000 in 2025 dollars) in bonds to begin construction on the line. Surveying of the potential route began on August 26, 1849, and was completed in December.

The FCC's railroad primarily followed the Franklin Canal towpath. North of the French Creek feeder aqueduct at Meadville, two routes were identified to reach Lake Erie. One route followed Cussewago and Conneaut creeks to Erie. The other followed French Creek to Waterford. Just east of Waterford the route connected with the Erie and Sunbury Railroad, which (it was assumed) would grant the FCC trackage rights to Erie. The Cussewago/Conneaut route was chosen because although the route crossed ravines 800 to 1,400 feet (240 to 430 m) wide (and two of them more than 100 feet (30 m) deep) it had a ruling grade reported as either 0.28 percent (15 feet per mile) or 0.34 (18 feet per mile). In addition to choosing the Cussewago/Conneaut route, the FCC also intended to build a 25.5-mile (41.0 km) branch line along the shore of Lake Erie from Erie to the Ohio–Pennsylvania border. Completion of this branch line (the "Lake Shore Division") was to occur before construction of the main line, since the branch line would connect the CP&A and the E&NE and bring the FCC significant income with which to build its main line. After the main line was finished, the FCC said, a route through the city of Erie to the harbor would be surveyed and constructed. For the immediate future, however, both the main line and Lake Shore Division would terminate at the Erie & North East railroad depot at Sassafras and W. 14th Streets.

On January 10, 1850, the Cleveland, Painesville and Ashtabula Railroad (then in the process of surveying its own route) agreed to connect its line with the FCC at the Ohio–Pennsylvania border. This simple written agreement required no actual construction, however, and was canceled. On August 26, 1850, the CP&A signed a new agreement which required it to build a line to the Pennsylvania border and connect it to the FCC's Lake Shore Division. The CP&A further agreed to build the FCC's line for the canal company. (Note: The agreement was apparently made in late 1850, but not signed until May 14, 1851.) The road from Cleveland to Erie would be operated as a single line by the CP&A, although the locomotives, rolling stock, and other equipment needed to operate it would be purchased jointly by the two companies. (Note: The cost of this equipment was to be prorated to each company based on the length of road owned by each between Cleveland and Erie.) Profits (or losses) were to be prorated to each company based on the length of road owned by each between Cleveland and Erie. The contract went into force in December 1852.

=== Building the Pennsylvania road ===
By the first half of 1850, the cost of building the Lake Shore Division had risen to $632,000 ($24,500,000 in 2025 dollars). The FCC had enough funds in hand to purchase in fee simple the land it needed (Note: The FCC followed through on this promise, purchasing land for the railroad rather than obtaining easements or right of way agreements. The FCC purchased land in cash, by promising cash at a future date, by exchanging land for company stock, and by promising cash "upon entry" (e.g., when construction reached the land). The FCC had also secured land for depots and stations by paying cash and or promising cash upon entry.) and to clear, grade, and fence it. The company also had enough funds to build depots and stations at intervals on the route, and by January 1851 a portion of the route began to be cleared and graded.

The directors of the FCC concluded that selling bonds would be better than selling more stock if the necessary funds to finish the Lake Shore Division were to be raised. But with no assets, the company had no collateral to guarantee the bonds. The CP&A stepped in with a solution: It would seek legislation in the state of Ohio allowing it to guarantee the bonds of other railroads. The CP&A would then guarantee the FCC's bonds, allowing a successful sale and completion of the road. As part of the deal, the FCC agreed to reserve two spots on its board of directors for CP&A representatives. At the August 1850 meeting of the FCC's stockholders, five directors were elected. These included John Galbraith, William A. Galbraith, and William S. Lane (all of Erie), as well as Herman B. Ely and Frederick Harbach of the CP&A. The directors elected Galbraith president, and Lane treasurer. Alex C. Twining was appointed the road's chief engineer. On December 10, 1850, the state of Ohio enacted legislation granting the CP&A the authority to guarantee the bonds of other railroads. (Note: In 1848, the state of Ohio required all railroads within the state to adopt a gauge of 4 ft 10 in (1,473 mm). The 1850 bond-guarantee act also gave the CP&A the authority to change its gauge to that of any railroad to which it connected. In 1852, Ohio repealed the 1848 act, allowing railroads to adopt any gauge they chose so long as the gauge was uniform along the entire length of their road.)

On February 1, 1851, the FCC sold $400,000 ($15,500,000 in 2025 dollars) in bonds to complete construction of and to buy equipment, locomotives, and rolling stock for its road. (Note: George S. Coe, a prominent New York City banker, agreed to purchase all the bonds and resell them.) All the bonds were guaranteed by the CP&A.

The FCC anticipated spending $130,000 ($5,000,000 in 2025 dollars) purchasing rail and grading the line, and $270,000 ($10,400,000 in 2025 dollars) in constructing the line. Iron track for the FCC railroad was purchased in March 1851, but on April 15 the Pennsylvania General Assembly enacted a law forbidding any Pennsylvania railroad from connecting with any railroad in New York or Ohio. This apparently delayed construction for about nine months, during which time the CP&A announced it would merge with the FCC. (Note: The merger was announced on May 30, 1851.) Eventually, legal counsel for the FCC determined that the company's charter did not "contain any prohibition either by express language or by implication, against going to, or touching the State line." Based on this construction of their charter, the FCC began construction on the Lake Shore Division shortly after November 1851.

When the Lake Shore Division was completed in 1852 is a matter of some dispute. Sources place the end of construction on September 1, (Note: This date seems to rely on the fact that the FCC did not build a line west of Crooked Creek, due to the state of Pennsylvania's opposition.) November 17, and November 20. It is also unclear when trains began running, as sources claim either October 15, November 23, and December 17.

More clear is the final cost of constructing the Lake Shore Division, which totaled $550,000 ($21,300,000 in 2025 dollars). The cost of depots, stations, and other improvements added another $52,252 ($2,000,000 in 2025 dollars). (Note: To complete the Lake Shore Division, the FCC was loaned $36,252 ($1,400,000 in 2025 dollars) by the CP&A, and the FCC another $66,000 ($2,600,000 in 2025 dollars) in bonds.)

The Lake Shore Division used an existing station in the city of Erie for its eastern terminus. Located on W. 14th Street between Peach and Sassafras Streets (the site of the current Union Station), this structure was erected by the Erie & North East Railroad in 1851. It was a two-story brick structure with a balcony overlooking W. 14th Street. (Note: President-Elect Abraham Lincoln stopped at the station and gave a speech on his way from Illinois to Washington, D.C., in March 1861. He spent the night in Erie.)

== Erie Gauge War ==
Two companies, the New York and Erie Railroad (the "Erie Railroad") and the New York Central Railroad, were vying to reach the New York–Pennsylvania border. The Central, with its terminus at Buffalo, used a track gauge of 4 ft 8 1/2 in (1,435 mm) (later known as the "standard gauge"). The Erie, with its terminus at Dunkirk (45 miles (72 km) to the southwest of Buffalo), used a track gauge of 6 ft (1,829 mm) (known as a broad gauge). In Pennsylvania, the Erie & North East Railroad had a charter allowing it to build a line from Erie to the New York–Pennsylvania border. The Erie Railroad was the first to promise to build a branch (the Dunkirk and State Line Railroad) to meet the E&NE. To avoid a break in gauge, the E&NE also adopted a 6 ft (1,829 mm) track gauge. The E&NE was completed in January 1852. The New York Central then announced that it was building a branch (the Buffalo and State Line Railroad) to connect Buffalo with the E&NE. Eager to obtain traffic from the New York Central as well, the E&NE agreed to build a second track, with a 4 ft 8 1/2 in (1,435 mm) gauge, alongside its broad gauge main line.

The addition of the E&NE of a 4 ft 8 1/2 in (1,435 mm) gauge track deeply concerned the citizens of the city of Erie. Both the CP&A and the FCC used a 4 ft 10 in (1,473 mm) track gauge (known as the "Ohio Gauge" because the state of Ohio required all railroads to use it). Although the standard gauge and Ohio gauge were very similar, they were not the same. The break in gauges meant that passengers and cargo had to be transshipped at Erie. (Note: Later, railroad cars could be equipped with "wide flange" wheels could travel on both the 4 ft 8 1/2 in (1,435 mm) and the 4 ft 10 in (1,473 mm) track gauges without the need for transshipment.) This generated jobs in Erie. Wagons, warehouses, and workers were needed to move and often store freight (sometimes for several days). Carriages, food vendors, hotels, and restaurants were needed to serve passengers (some of whom had to stay overnight). Citizens in Erie were concerned that the E&NE and New York Central would adopt the Ohio gauge, depriving their city of business. Many people in Erie, Pennsylvania's only port on Lake Erie, wanted the FCC and E&NE to build spurs to the harbor, which would offset the loss of transshipment business, but no spurs had been constructed. Responding to their concerns, the Pennsylvania General Assembly enacted a law on March 12, 1852, prohibiting railroads in the state from changing their gauges. The E&NE and the New York Central, wishing to avoid transshipment costs, lobbied heavily for repeal of this law, which occurred on April 11, 1853.

=== Pennsylvania Supreme Court charter interpretation ===
While the gauge freeze was in place, the Attorney General of Pennsylvania filed suit on October 12, 1852, to enjoin the Franklin Canal Company from opening its nearly-completed railroad. The Attorney General argued that the FCC had violated its charter by constructing a line from Erie to the Ohio–Pennsylvania state border. The FCC halted construction of its line at Crooked Creek although whether it did before or after the state's action is not clear. The FCC lost the case, and appealed to the Supreme Court of Pennsylvania on December 27, 1852. The FCC argued that its charter gave it wide leeway to build a railroad as it saw fit, so long as it eventually reached Lake Erie. There was no bar to branch lines, (Note: The company argued that the 5.5-mile (8.9 km) track from Crooked Creek to the Ohio state line was merely a spur.) and no deadlines for making the connection to the lakeshore. Moreover, the company argued, the state of Ohio never protested the company's plans while Lake Shore Division was being constructed, even though the company made annual reports to the state legislature documenting its intentions and construction progress. On January 10, 1853, the state supreme court ruled in favor of the FCC. However, the court interpreted the charter to preclude the construction of any railroad within 5.5 miles (8.9 km) of the Ohio border.

Alarmed that the Lake Shore Division might not reach the state border, Alfred Kelley personally purchased the 5.5-mile (8.9 km) right of way. (Note: Although the FCC had enough funds in hand in December 1850 to purchase this land, it apparently had not yet done so.) Pennsylvania law permitted private individuals to construct "lateral railroads" to connect their factories, farms, mines, or other real estate to state-chartered railroads. (Note: The right to construct lateral railroads was granted in May 1832 in An Act Regulating Lateral Railroads, although they were restricted to 3 miles (4.8 km) in length and could only be constructed in Lycoming, Luzerne, Northumberland, and Schuylkill counties. The law was amended in March 1840 to permit lateral railroads up to 6 miles (9.7 km) in length in A Supplement to the Act Entitled "An Act Regulating Lateral Railroads". The state legislature extended the right to build lateral railroads to all parts of the state in April 1848 in An Act Relative to Margaret Parthmore and Relative to Lateral Railroads, Etc..) Kelley initially proposed that several less-prominent directors of and investors in the CP&A and FCC purchase the land and build this lateral railroad with funds provided by the CP&A, but none were willing to take the risk. Kelley went forward with the project on his own, with funds secretly provided by the CP&A. Kelley personally visited landowners along the route, making friends with them and buying the land he needed. In some cases, he was required to purchase entire farms. He also won passage of local ordinances permitting his lateral railroad to cross public roads. Kelley then had the line graded and constructed, and conveyed the lateral railroad to the FCC.

=== Erie Gauge War ===
During the first six months of 1853, the city council and the townspeople of Erie held numerous meetings to discuss rumors that the E&NE would change its gauge to match that of the FCC. The city threatened to revoke the FCC's franchise, which gave it permission to run its line through town. By April, the situation had so deteriorated that the CP&A considered bypassing Erie altogether and connecting to existing railroad lines routing traffic through Pittsburgh. The people of Erie were further alarmed by a major corporate development in the summer of 1853. The E&NE had paid its contractors with bonds, who in turn sold them to raise cash. By the end of the summer of 1853, the Buffalo and State Line Railroad (B&SL) had acquired two-thirds of these bonds. The New York Central-owned B&SL began to pressure the directors of the E&NE to change their 4 ft 8 1/2 in (1,435 mm) track gauge to 4 ft 10 in (1,473 mm) to avoid transshipment in Erie. If the E&NE's directors refused, the B&SL said it would call the bonds, take over the railroad, and install a more compliant board. The E&NE directors decided to make the gauge change, and signed an agreement with the B&SL on November 17, 1853, formalizing the decision. Further alarming the people of Erie, the CP&A took over operation of the FCC's Lake Shore Division on December 1, 1853.

What became known as the Erie Gauge War began on December 7, 1853, when the E&NE began work to alter its gauge. Urged on by the Erie mayor Alfred King and Erie & Sunbury Railroad director Morrow B. Lowry, mobs in Erie and the nearby village of Harborcreek tore up the E&NE's and FCC's track, demolished several of their bridges, and assaulted railroad officials. When the railroads tried to relay the track, the mobs attacked construction workers and tore up the rails again. The city of Erie also tried to obtain an injunction against the FCC for violating its state-issued charter, but the Pennsylvania Supreme Court refused to issue the injunction. (Note: At issue was an interpretation of the railroad's charter, which required it to terminate its line within the Erie city limits. The charter was enacted in 1842, and Erie expanded its boundaries in 1849. The E&NE terminus was not within the 1842 city limits, but was within the 1849 city limits. The state supreme court concluded that the E&NE had not forfeited its charter by terminating its line outside the city's 1842 boundary, but had misinterpreted the charter. It ordered the E&NE to move its terminus, and the railroad complied (at significant expense).) The CP&A threatened to raise a private militia to protect the property of the FCC if the state could or would not do so. The FCC counter-sued the city, and won a Pennsylvania Supreme Court injunction on December 17 ordering the mayor to stop inciting the mobs. Rioters continued to attack both railroads, and a United States Marshal proved unable to stop the violence and destruction of property. Railroad officials and some members of Congress began to call for Federal troops to be sent to Erie to enforce the law. A group of townspeople seized and jailed the U.S. Marshal on January 12, releasing him two days later. The marshal's arrest was national news, but President Franklin Pierce declined to send Federal troops to enforce the court orders.

Tensions died down considerably when, on January 28, 1854, the Pennsylvania General Assembly enacted legislation declaring the FCC in violation of its charter. The law repealed the company's charter and authorized the state to take control of the company. It also specifically prohibited a connection between the E&NE and any railroad to the west. A jubilant crowd tore up the connection at Sassafras Street in Erie, and "sentinels" were posted by the townspeople to ensure no new connection was made. Pennsylvania Governor William Bigler seized the FCC on January 30, and appointed William F. Packer as the company's superintendent. The CP&A continued to operate the FCC on behalf of the state, forwarding 47 percent of all revenues generated by the Lake Shore Division to the state treasury.

=== Connecting the FCC and E&NE ===
The state of Pennsylvania had no interest in running a railroad. On May 5, 1854, the General Assembly enacted new legislation permitting the CP&A to build a line from the Ohio–Pennsylvania border east to Erie. The law allowed the CP&A to purchase the FCC, provided that the CP&A connected with the Erie and Sunbury Railroad at Erie's harbor. (Note: The Erie & Sunbury Railroad was a strongly-favored project of Erie's political leaders and citizenry. Yet, by December 1854, only a 27.5-mile (44.3 km) section between Milton and Williamsport had been constructed. This was less than 10 percent of the completed road's 287.6 miles (462.8 km).) The CP&A was also required to purchase $500,000 ($17,900,000 in 2025 dollars) of Erie & Sunbury stock with bonds issued by the CP&A. (Note: The act also required the E&NE to connect with Erie & Sunbury at Erie's harbor and to tear up all its existing railroad tracks in the center of the city, but permitted the E&NE to narrow its gauge. These provisions were partially superseded in October 1855, when the Pennsylvania General Assembly revoked the charter of the Erie & North East. The revocation legislation included a provision under which the administrator of the railroad would adopt either a 4 ft 8 1/2 in (1,435 mm) gauge or a 6 ft (1,829 mm) gauge, but not a 4 ft 10 in (1,473 mm) gauge. Six months later, a new charter was granted which required the E&NE to either purchase $400,000 ($13,800,000 in 2025 dollars) in the Pittsburgh and Erie Railroad, or to provide track construction services and supplies to it in the same amount. The E&NE was required by the new charter to build a spur to the Erie harbor and connect with the Erie & Sunbury there.) The CP&A, which already owned the FCC, assumed title to the Lake Shore Division. Although the required bond purchase was called a bribe by railroad industry observers and blackmail by Erie historian Edward Mott, the CP&A took steps to comply with the remaining terms of the law within months. (Note: The $500,000 allowed for the completion of the Erie and Sunbury Railroad, which became the Philadelphia and Erie Railroad when it opened in October 1864.)

Sources vary considerably on when the break at Erie ended. According to some sources, temporary superintendent Packer ordered the FCC and the E&NE connected immediately and the break was removed on February 1, 1854. The first through train between Cleveland and Buffalo ran over the former break later that day. The Erie Weekly Gazette, however, reported that the break still existed as of February 9, 1854, and Packer had agreed to retain it at least until May 1. Other sources indicate that the break was not removed until March 1855, with the first through trains running on April 1. Some sources place the removal of the break in spring of 1856, while others say, vaguely, that the break was removed some time after passage of the Kansas–Nebraska Act in 1854 (but before the end of the Civil War).

The operation of the line was disrupted again in October 1855, when the Pennsylvania General Assembly revoked the charter of the Erie & North East. On November 17, 1855, the state-appointed commissioner operating the E&NE informed the CP&A that it could no longer operate rolling stock over the line. This bar remained in place until May 15, 1856, when the charter was restored to the E&NE.

The city of Erie continued to oppose the link between the CP&A and the E&NE. The city took the CP&A to court, but in January 1856 the Pennsylvania Supreme Court held that CP&A had the legal right to connect to the E&NE at the eastern boundary of the Erie city limits. The court issued an injunction against the city, preventing any further interference with the railroad link.

== Operational history of the railroad ==
=== Leadership ===
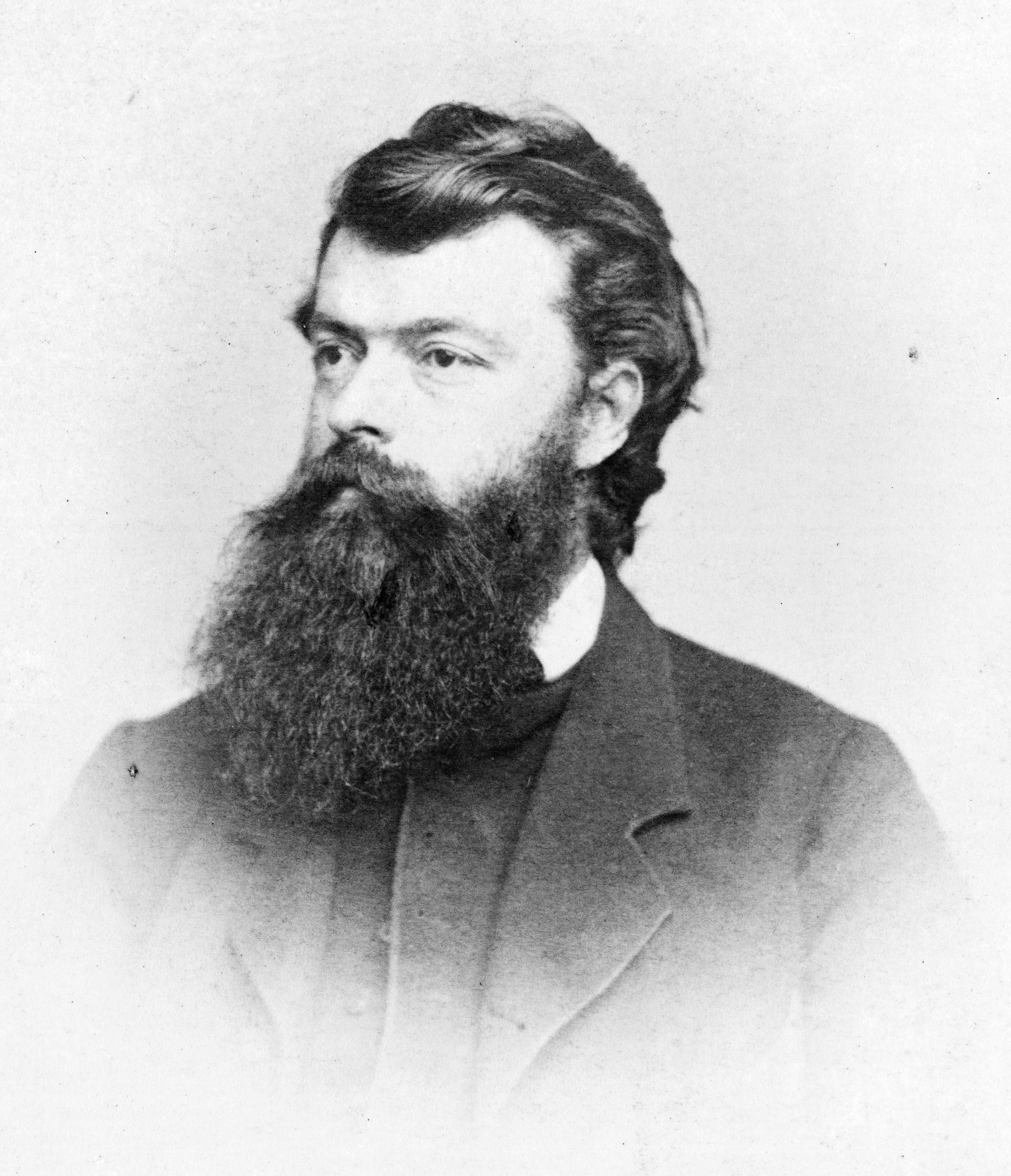
John Henry Devereux, who oversaw the CP&A's merger into the Lake Shore Railway

A major leadership change occurred at the CP&A in 1851. The CCC was completed in February 1851, and Alfred Kelley finally took up the CP&A presidency the following month. He resigned this position in February 1854, and was replaced temporarily by William Case. Case was elected to a full term as president in August 1854.

Case retired as president in August 1858, and was replaced by Amasa Stone. Stone served as the CP&A's president from August 1858 to March 1869. Stone was severely injured in a carriage accident in October 1867, and went to Europe for 15 months beginning in May 1868 to recover his health. John Henry Devereux, the railroad's vice president, oversaw operations in Stone's absence.

Devereux remained the railroad's acting president until its March 1869 merger.

=== Stations and roundhouses ===
When the Cleveland, Columbus and Cincinnati Railroad (CCC) was building its line, it constructed a brick depot in Cleveland on Front Street at the foot of Water Street. This depot opened on May 29, 1851. Although it was initially used only by the CCC, the depot had been constructed as a cooperative effort by the CCC, CP&A, and Cleveland and Pittsburgh Railroad (C&P).

In January 1853, the CP&A began building a new passenger station adjacent to the C&P's Outer Station. A wooden freight depot was erected next to this new passenger station, and extensive sidings constructed to provide access to both buildings as well as to permit the idling of trains. The two-story brick passenger depot was completed in mid-March 1853.

In the summer of 1853, the CP&A extended its Cleveland tracks to the Front Street Station. That year, northwest of the intersection of Lake Street (now Lakeside Avenue) and Alba Street (later known as Depot Street, now E. 26th Street), the railroad also built a repair yard that included a car shop, blacksmith shop, lumber shed, paint shop, rail repair shop, and roundhouse. The blacksmith building was 180 by 40 feet (55 by 12 m) and contained 12 forges. The car shop, where rolling stock was repaired, was 60 by 200 feet (18 by 61 m), made of brick, and employed 60 men. The lumber shed, which provided wood for rolling stock repair, was 40 by 350 feet (12 by 107 m). The nearby paint shop, where engines and rolling stock could be repainted, was 60 by 200 feet (18 by 61 m). Worn or damaged track was repaired in the rail shop, which had four forges and employed eight men. The roundhouse was 166 feet (51 m) in diameter, and had stalls for 20 engines. The company began expansion of the Lake Street rail repair yard in March 1857. Completed about July 1858, the expansion included a two-story, 70-by-288-foot (21 by 88 m) machine shop. The structure featured steam heat and iron columns that held up the second floor and roof. The machine shop covered the entire first floor. A business office, two storerooms, a library, wash room, bathing facilities, and pattern room (where patterns for equipment and wheels were kept) occupied the second floor. Also part of the expansion was a 45-by-70-foot (14 by 21 m) boiler shop for the repair of locomotive engines.

During the American Civil War, the CP&A expanded its presence at both of its termini. It constructed a roundhouse in Erie at Chestnut Street in 1863 which had stalls for 21 locomotives. (Although a connection with the E&NE had probably existed since 1855, trains continued to change locomotives at the Erie station 1891.) The CP&A also collaborated with the Erie & Pittsburgh and Philadelphia & Erie railroads to build a new station in Erie. Construction of the $150,000 Union Station (which replaced the 1851 depot) was announced in March 1863. It was completed in July 1864. (Note: The CP&A's successor, the Lake Shore & Michigan Southern Railroad, erected a new freight station at Sassafras Street in 1877, and enlarged it in 1881.) In 1865, the CP&A completed work on a new Union Station in Cleveland. This work began in 1862, when the CC&C, CP&A, C&P, and the Cleveland and Toledo Railroad agreed that the existing station was far too small to accommodate existing needs much less future growth. Engineer Benjamin Franklin Morse acted as architect of the new structure, whose costs of construction were shared equally by all four railroads. When completed, Cleveland's Union Station had the largest train shed in the nation. The Pittsburgh and Erie Railroad later rented space in the building, paying one-third of the interest on the cost of construction and one-third of the cost of upkeep.

In March 1869, just days before its merger into the Lake Shore & Michigan Southern Railroad, the CP&A (operating under its new name, the Lake Shore Railway) completed construction on a new brick freight depot in Cleveland. This two-story building was 400 feet (120 m) long, 80 feet (24 m) deep, and 27 feet (8.2 m) high, and cost $60,000 ($1,500,000 in 2025 dollars).

=== Expansion ===
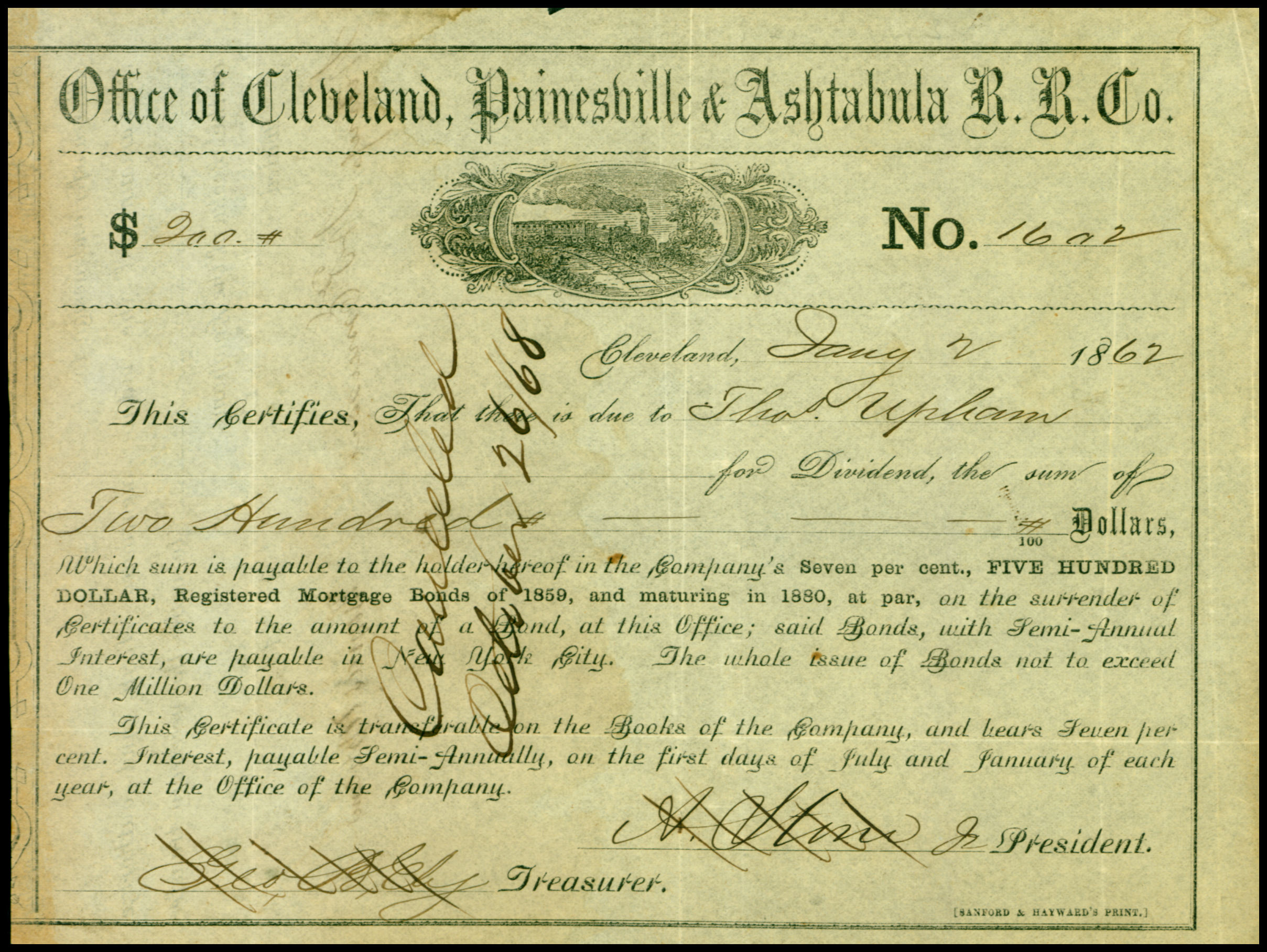
Bond of the Office of Cleveland, Painesville & Ashtabula RR, issued 2. January 1862

On April 1, 1855, the 1851–1852 operating contract between the FCC and CP&A was superseded by a new agreement under which FCC-branded locomotives, rolling stock, and depots were rebranded with the CP&A name and logo. Under the old contract, CP&A cars could travel east but not west over the FCC line (and vice versa). (Note: Freight cars had to return empty, causing significant revenue losses.) The new agreement allowed CP&A rolling stock to travel over both lines in either direction.

The CP&A completed its spur to Erie's harbor in 1857 at a cost of $48,477 ($1,700,000 in 2025 dollars).

The CP&A began expanding in Pennsylvania during the Civil War. On March 9, 1863, the Pennsylvania General Assembly enacted legislation giving the CP&A permission to own up to 5,000 acres (20 km^{2}) of land in Mercer and Venango counties. This included the right to own and operate mines on these lands, and the authority to build branch lines (no more than 10 miles (16 km) in length) from any part of its road in Pennsylvania so long as the branch lines did not extend north of French Creek nor to Oil Creek. The railroad also began construction of a 36-mile (58 km) branch line from Ashtabula to Jamestown, Pennsylvania, in 1863. The branch was completed in August 1872. On March 21, 1864, the CP&A signed a 20-year lease for the Jamestown and Franklin Railroad (J&F), which ran from Jamestown (near the Ohio–Pennsylvania border) east to Franklin. The CP&A returned 40 percent of the J&F's annual earnings to the line's builders. (Note: The Jamestown and Franklin Railroad was incorporated in April 1862 but never completed. Once the lease was signed, the CP&A began loaning the J&F extensive funds, allowing the smaller railroad to finish its line. The LS&MS purchased the J&F outright in 1910.) The CP&A also constructed spurs from the J&F into the coal fields around Franklin, Pennsylvania.

In April 1864, the Pennsylvania legislature passed a law allowing the CP&A to extend its line past Franklin to Latona, Pennsylvania (now Oil City, Pennsylvania). This work, begun in 1865, was finished on May 24, 1870, giving the J&F a line 51 miles (82 km) in length.

The Cleveland, Painesville and Ashtabula Railroad operated its own track as well as the track of the Franklin Canal Company under the legal name of the Cleveland and Erie Railroad. According to the industry publication The Railway News, by 1866 it was the "most profitable line in America", and had made the greatest return on investment of any railroad line in the nation.

== Merger into the Lake Shore and Southern Michigan Railroad ==
The CP&A engaged in a two-year wave of consolidations after the Civil War which led to the founding of the Lake Shore and Southern Michigan Railroad. The first of these occurred on October 8, 1867, when the CP&A leased the Cleveland and Toledo Railroad.

The CP&A changed its name to the Lake Shore Railway on June 17, 1868, and on February 11, 1869, the Cleveland and Toledo merged into the Lake Shore Railway.

On April 6, 1869, the Michigan Southern and Northern Indiana Railroad and the Lake Shore Railway merged to form the Lake Shore and Michigan Southern Railway (LS&MS). This was followed on August 1, 1869, by the merger of the Buffalo and Erie Railroad into the LS&MS. (Note: The Buffalo and State Line Railroad and the Erie and North East Railroad signed an operating agreement on May 15, 1867, under which the two railroads effectively merged their operations and began using the Buffalo and Erie Railroad name.) The merger placed the line from Chicago to Buffalo under the control of a single company for the first time.

The LS&MS adopted the standard gauge of 4 ft 8 1/2 in (1,435 mm) over the entire length of its road between 1877 and 1879.

== About the line ==
From the beginning of operations in 1851 until 1863, the Cleveland, Painesville and Ashtabula Railroad operated 71 miles (114 km) of track in Ohio and another 25.5 miles (41.0 km) of track in Pennsylvania via the Franklin Canal Company (which was effectively a subsidiary of the CP&A). The CP&A added a 3-mile (4.8 km) spur in the city of Erie in 1847, and began the 36-mile (58 km) Jamestown Branch in 1863. It leased the Jamestown & Franklin Railroad in 1864, and extended it to Latona in 1865, giving the J&F a total length of 51 miles (82 km). It leased the entirety of the 156.7-mile (252.2 km) Cleveland and Toledo Railroad in 1867. (Note: The Cleveland and Toledo main line was 112.7 miles (181.4 km) long. It also had a 35-mile (56 km) Elyria-to-Sandusky Branch, and a 9-mile (14 km) Greytown-to-Junction Branch.)

In 1868, the year before its merger into the Lake Shore & Michigan Southern, the CP&A had 16 miles (26 km) miles of double track (15 miles (24 km) of which were in Ohio), and 24 miles (39 km) miles of siding (15 miles (24 km) of which were in Ohio). It had 19 stations, of which only two were in Pennsylvania (at Erie and Girard). It owned 39 locomotives, 25 first-class passenger cars, nine second-class passenger cars, six sleeping cars, 10 mail and express-freight cars, and 1,038 freight cars.

== See also ==
- Cleveland railroad history

== Bibliography ==
- Alburn, Wilfred Henry; Alburn, Miriam Russell (1933). This Cleveland of Ours. Chicago: S.J. Clarke Publishing Co.
- "Amasa Stone". Magazine of Western History: 108–112. December 1885.
- Babcock, Charles A. (1919). Venango County, Pennsylvania: Her Pioneers and People. Chicago: J.H. Beers.
- Ball, George W.I. (1884). General Railroad and Telegraph Laws of the State of Pennsylvania. Philadelphia: Allen, Lane & Scott.
- Bates, James L. (1888). Alfred Kelley: His Life and Work. Columbus, Ohio: Press of R. Clarke & Co. p. 179. "Alfred Kelley Cleveland, Painesville and Ashtabula."
- Bell, Herbert C. (1890). History of Venango County, Pennsylvania: Its Past and Present. Chicago: Brown, Runk & Co.
- Biographical History of Northeastern Ohio: Embracing the Counties of Ashtabula, Geauga and Lake. Chicago: Lewis Publishing Co. 1893.
- Bryan, Ford R.; Evans, Sara (2006). Henry's Attic: Some Fascinating Gifts to Henry Ford and His Museum. Detroit: Wayne State University Press. ISBN 9780814326428.
- Camp, Mark J. (2007). Railroad Depots of Northeast Ohio. Charleston, S.C.: Arcadia Publishing. ISBN 9780738551159.
- "Case of the Franklin Canal Company". Journal of the Senate of the Commonwealth of Pennsylvania, Commenced at Harrisburg, Tuesday the Fourth Day of January, In the Year of Our Lord One Thousand Eight-Hundred and Fifty-Three. Volume II. Harrisburg, Pa.: Theo. Fenn & Co., Printers to the State. 1853.
- Churella, Albert J. (2013). The Pennsylvania Railroad. Volume 1: Building an Empire, 1846–1917. Philadelphia: University of Pennsylvania Press. ISBN 9780812243482.
- Cutter, William Richard (1913). New England Families, Genealogical and Memorial: A Record of the Achievements of Her People in the Making of Commonwealths and the Founding of a Nation. New York: Lewis Historical Publishing Co. p. 797. "Amasa Stone 1818 Charlton."
- "Documents Accompanying the Annual Message of the Governor. Doc. No. 2". Miscellaneous Documents, Read in the Legislature of the Commonwealth of Pennsylvania, During the Session Which Commenced at Harrisburg, On the Sixth Day of January, 1857. Harrisburg, Pa.: A. Boyd Hamilton State Printer. 1857.
- Eaton, S.J.M. (1876). "Venango County". In Egle, William H. (ed.). An Illustrated History of the Commonwealth of Pennsylvania. Harrisburg, Pa.: DeWitt C. Goodrich & Co.
- Faber, Don (2012). The Boy Governor: Stevens T. Mason and the Birth of Michigan Politics. Ann Arbor, Mich.: University of Michigan Press. ISBN 9780472071586.
- Feather, Carl E. (2014). The Covered Bridges of Ashtabula County, Ohio. Charleston, S.C.: History Press. ISBN 9781626192614.
- Fick, Dean K. (2003). The Lakeside and Marblehead Railroad. Davenport, Ia.: Montevallo Historical Press. ISBN 9780965862424.
- Franklin Canal Company (1851). Pennsylvania Section of the Erie and Cleveland Railroad. New York: William W. Rose, stationer. hdl:2027/ien.35556042945196.
- Franklin Canal Company (1853). "Report of the Franklin Canal Company". Journal of the Senate of the Commonwealth of Pennsylvania, Commenced at Harrisburg, Tuesday the Fourth Day of January, In the Year of Our Lord One Thousand Eight-Hundred and Fifty-Three. Volume II (Report). Harrisburg, Pa.: Theo. Fenn & Co., Printers to the State. pp. 355–359.
- Grinde, Donald A. Jr. (January 1974). "Erie's Railroad War: A Case Study of Purposive Violence for a Community's Economic Advancement". Western Pennsylvania Historical Magazine: 15–23.
- Haddad, Gladys (2007). Flora Stone Mather: Daughter of Cleveland's Euclid Avenue and Ohio's Western Reserve. Kent, Ohio: Kent State University Press. ISBN 978-0-87338-899-3.
- Hannan, Caryn; Herman, Jennifer L. (2008). Michigan Encyclopedia. Volume 1. Hamburg, Mich.: State History Publications. ISBN 9781878592941.
- Harbach, Frederick (1850). Report on the Preliminary Surveys for the Cleveland, Painesville and Ashtabula Railroad Company. Cleveland: Sanford & Hayward.
- Hatcher, Harlan (1988). "Building the Railroads". In Lupold, Harry Forrest; Haddad, Gladys (eds.). Ohio's Western Reserve: A Regional Reader. Kent, Ohio: Kent State University Press. ISBN 9780873383639.
- Havighurst, Walter (1977). Ohio: A Bicentennial History. New York: Norton. ISBN 9780393056136.
- History of Erie County, Pennsylvania. Volume 1. Chicago: Warner, Beers, & Co. 1884.
- Hoch, Bradley R. (2001). The Lincoln Trail in Pennsylvania: A History and Guide. University Park, Pa.: Pennsylvania State University Press. ISBN 9780271021195.
- Holley, Alexander L. (1867). American and European Railway Practice in the Economical Generation of Steam. New York: D. Van Nostrand.
- Hungerford, Edward (1945). Pattern for a Railroad for Tomorrow, 1960. Milwaukee, Wisc.: Kalmbach Publishing Co.
- Johnson, Crisfield (1879). History of Cuyahoga County, Ohio: With Portraits and Biographical Sketches of Its Prominent Men and Pioneers. Philadelphia: D.W. Ensign. p. 384. "Amasa Stone 1818 Charlton."
- Kennedy, James Harrison (1896). A History of the City of Cleveland: Its Settlement, Rise and Progress, 1796–1896. Cleveland: Imperial Press. p. 325. "Alfred Kelley Amasa Stone."
- Kent, Donald H. (October 1948). "The Erie War of the Gauges". Pennsylvania History: 253–275.
- "The Lake Shore Lines". The Railway News. April 28, 1866. pp. 448–451.
- Larick, Roy; Gibbons, Bob; Siplock, Edward (2005). Euclid Creek. Charleston, S.C.: Arcadia Publishing. ISBN 9780738539539.
- Lyles, James H. (1869). Official Railway Manual of the Railroads of North America. New York: Russell's American Steam Printing House. hdl:2027/mdp.39015024392816.
- McLellan, David; Warrick, Bill (1989). The Lake Shore & Michigan Southern Railway. Polo, Ill.: Transportation Trails. ISBN 9780933449091.
- "Memoirs of Deceased Members". Proceedings of the American Society of Civil Engineers. Volume XL (Report). New York: American Society of Civil Engineers. 1914.
- Michaud, Denise (2010). Madison. Charleston, S.C.: Arcadia Publishing. ISBN 9780738578156.
- Michigan Railroad Commission (1877). Fifth Annual Report of the Commissioner of Railroads of the State of Michigan, for the Year Ending December 31, 1876. Lansing, Mich.: W.S. George and Co., State Printers and Binders. pp. 34 v. hdl:2027/njp.32101066784305.
- Miller, John (1909). A Twentieth Century History of Erie County, Pennsylvania. Chicago: Lewis Publishing Co. ISBN 9785871217252.
- Moody's Manual of Railroads and Corporation Securities. Volume 1. New York: Moody Manual Company. 1915.
- Mott, Edward Harold (1901). Between the Ocean and the Lakes: The Story of Erie. New York: J.S. Collins.
- Myers, John; Cetina, Judith G. (2015). Irish Cleveland. Charleston, S.C.: Arcadia Publishing. ISBN 9781467113496.
- Seventh Annual Report of the President and Directors of the Lake Shore and Michigan Southern Railway Company to the Stockholders for the Fiscal Year Ending December 31, 1876 (Report). Cleveland: Fairbanks & Co. 1877.
- Ninth Annual Report of the President and Directors of the Lake Shore and Michigan Southern Railway Company to the Stockholders for the Fiscal Year Ending December 31, 1878 (Report). Cleveland: Fairbanks & Co. 1879.
- Niven, John (1995). Salmon P. Chase: A Biography. Oxford, UK: Oxford University Press. ISBN 9780195046533.
- Ohio Commissioner of Railroads and Telegraphs (1868). Annual Report of the Commissioner of Railroads and Telegraphs, to the Governor of the State of Ohio, for the Year 1867. Columbus, Ohio: L.D. Myers & Bro., State Printers. pp. 38 v. in 39. hdl:2027/njp.32101066796929.
- Ohio Commissioner of Railroads and Telegraphs (1868). Annual Report of the Commissioner of Railroads and Telegraphs of the State of Ohio, With Tabulations and Deductions From Reports of the Railroad Corporations of the State, for the Year Ending June 30, 1868. Columbus, Ohio: Columbus Printing Company, State Printers. hdl:2027/uc1.b2896930.
- Ohio Commissioner of Railroads and Telegraphs (1870). Annual Report of the Commissioner of Railroads and Telegraphs of the State of Ohio, With Tabulations and Deductions From Reports of the Railroad Corporations of the State, for the Year Ending June 30, 1869. Columbus, Ohio: Columbus Printing Company, State Printers.
- Ohio Commissioner of Railroads and Telegraphs (1871). Annual Report of the Commissioner of Railroads and Telegraphs, for the Year Ending June 30, 1870, In Two Volumes. Volume I. Columbus, Ohio: Nevins and Myers, State Printers.
- Ohio Commissioner of Railroads and Telegraphs (1874). Seventh Annual Report of the Commissioner of Railroads and Telegraphs of Ohio for the Year Ending June 30, 1873. Columbus, Ohio: Nevins and Myers, State Printers.
- Ohio Commissioner of Railroads and Telegraphs (1901). The Thirty-Fourth Annual Report of the Commissioner of Railroads and Telegraphs, to the Governor of the State Ohio, for the Year 1901. Columbus, Ohio: F.J. Heer, State Printer.
- Ohio Secretary of State (1848). Acts of a General Nature Passed By the Forty-Sixth General Assembly of the State of Ohio. Volume XLVI. Columbus, Ohio: Chas. Scott's Steam Press.
- Orth, Samuel Peter (1910). A History of Cleveland, Ohio. Volume I. Chicago: S.J. Clarke Publishing Co.
- Orth, Samuel Peter (1910). A History of Cleveland, Ohio. Volume II: Biography. Chicago: S.J. Clarke Publishing Co.
- Poor, Henry V. (1860). History of the Railroads and Canals of the United States of America. Volume 1. New York: John h. Schultz and Co.
- Poor, Henry V. (1868). Manual of the Railroads of the United States, 1868–69. New York: H.V. & H.W. Poor.
- Pred, Allan (1980). Urban Growth and City-Systems in the United States, 1840–1860. Cambridge, Mass.: Harvard University Press. ISBN 9780674930919.
- Puffert, Douglas J. (December 2000). "The Standardization of Track Gauge on North American Railways, 1830-1890" (PDF). The Journal of Economic History. pp. 933–960.
- "Real Builders of America: Amasa Stone—Bridge Builder, Railroad Constructor and Administrator". The Valve World. October 1911. pp. 689, 693.
- Reed, John Elmer (1925). History of Erie County, Pennsylvania. Topeka, Kan.: Historical Publishing Co.
- Rhodes, James Ford (1919). History of the United States From the Compromise of 1850. Volume 3. New York: Harper & Bros.
- Riddle, A.G. (1878). History of Geauga and Lake Counties, Ohio With Illustrations and Biographical Sketches of Its Pioneers and Most Prominent Men. Philadelphia: Williams Bros.
- Rose, William Ganson (1990). Cleveland: The Making of a City. Kent, Ohio: Kent State University Press. ISBN 9780873384285.
- Rosenberger, Homer Tope (1975). The Philadelphia and Erie Railroad: Its Place in American Economic History. Potomac, Md.: Fox Hills Press. ISBN 9780914932024.
- Sanders, Craig (2014). Cleveland Mainline Railroads. Charleston, S.C.: Arcadia Publishing. ISBN 9781467111379.
- Springirth, Kenneth C. (2009). Bessemer and Lake Erie Railroad. Charleston, S.C.: Arcadia Publishing. ISBN 9780738562667.
- Springirth, Kenneth C.; Weber, David L. (2011). Oil Creek and Titusville Railroad. Charleston, S.C.: Arcadia Publishing. ISBN 9780738575933.
- Sterling, Albert M.; Sterling, Edward B. (1909). The Sterling Genealogy. New York: Grafton Press.
- Stover, John F. (1995). History of the Baltimore and Ohio Railroad. West Lafayette, Ind.: Purdue University Press. ISBN 9781557530660.
- Vernon, Edward (1873). "American Railroad Manual for the United States and the Dominion". American Railroad Manual. Philadelphia: J.B. Lippincott & Co. hdl:2027/njp.32101066799089.
- Vogel, Charity Ann (2013). The Angola Horror: The 1867 Train Wreck That Shocked the Nation and Transformed American Railroads. Ithaca, N.Y.: Cornell University Press. ISBN 9780801449086.
- Voight, Norman R. (2017). Transportation Depth Reference Manual for the Civil PE Exam. Belmont, Calif.: Professional Publications. ISBN 9781591264682.
- Weiner, Ronald R. (2005). Lake Effects: A History of Urban Policy Making in Cleveland, 1825-1929. Columbus, Ohio: Ohio State University Press. ISBN 9780814209899.
- Wellejus, Edward T. (2004). Historic Erie County: An Illustrated History. San Antonio, Tex.: Historical Publishing Network. ISBN 9781883658441.
- Works Progress Administration (1937). Annals of Cleveland—1818-1935. Volume 50, Part 1. 1867. Cleveland: Cleveland Public Library.
- Yale College (1880). Obituary Record of Graduates of Yale College Deceased from June, 1870 to June, 1880. New Haven, Conn.: Tuttle, Morehouse & Taylor.
