= William Conover =

William Conover may refer to:

- William Sheldrick Conover (born 1928), U.S. Representative from Pennsylvania
- William B. Conover (1865–1947), American politician in Monmouth County, New Jersey
