= Joseph Grant Beale =

American politician (1839–1915)

Joseph G. Beale
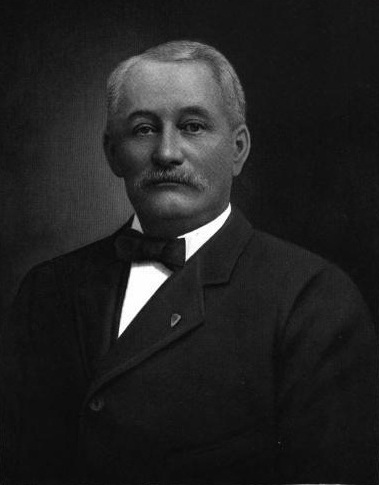

Member of the U.S. House of Representatives from Pennsylvania's 27th district
- In office March 4, 1907 – March 3, 1909
- Preceded by: William O. Smith
- Succeeded by: J. N. Langham

Personal details
- Born: Joseph Grant Beale; March 26, 1839 Freeport, Pennsylvania, U.S.
- Died: May 21, 1915 (aged 76)
- Resting place: Evergreen Cemetery
- Party: Republican

See Joseph Henry Beale for the law professor.

Joseph Grant Beale (March 26, 1839 – May 21, 1915) was an American businessman, American Civil War veteran, and politician who served one term as a Republican U.S. Representative from the state of Pennsylvania from 1907 to 1909.

== Biography ==
Joseph G. Beale was born near Freeport, Pennsylvania, in Allegheny County, Pennsylvania. He graduated from Caton Academy in Turtle Creek, Pennsylvania, and from the Iron City Commercial College in Pittsburgh, Pennsylvania.

=== Civil War ===
During the American Civil War, he enlisted in the Friend Rifles for three months, and later served as captain of Company C, Ninth Regiment, Pennsylvania Reserves, for three years. He was taken prisoner and confined in Libby Prison, Richmond, Virginia, until released on parole.

=== Business career ===
He studied law and served as major in the Pennsylvania State Militia. Discontinuing the study of law, he engaged in the coal business in the suburbs of Pittsburgh. In 1868, he moved to Leechburg, Pennsylvania, and actively engaged in the iron and steel business. He served as president of the Leechburg Banking Co.

=== Congress ===
Beale was elected as a Republican to the Sixtieth Congress, but was an unsuccessful candidate for renomination in 1908.

=== Later career and death ===
He resumed his former business pursuits, and died in Leechburg in 1915 at the age of 76. Interment was in Evergreen Cemetery.

U.S. House of Representatives
Preceded by William O. Smith	Member of the U.S. House of Representatives from Pennsylvania's 27th congressional district 1907 - 1909	Succeeded by J. N. Langham
