= Albert Gallatin Egbert =

American politician

Albert G. Egbert
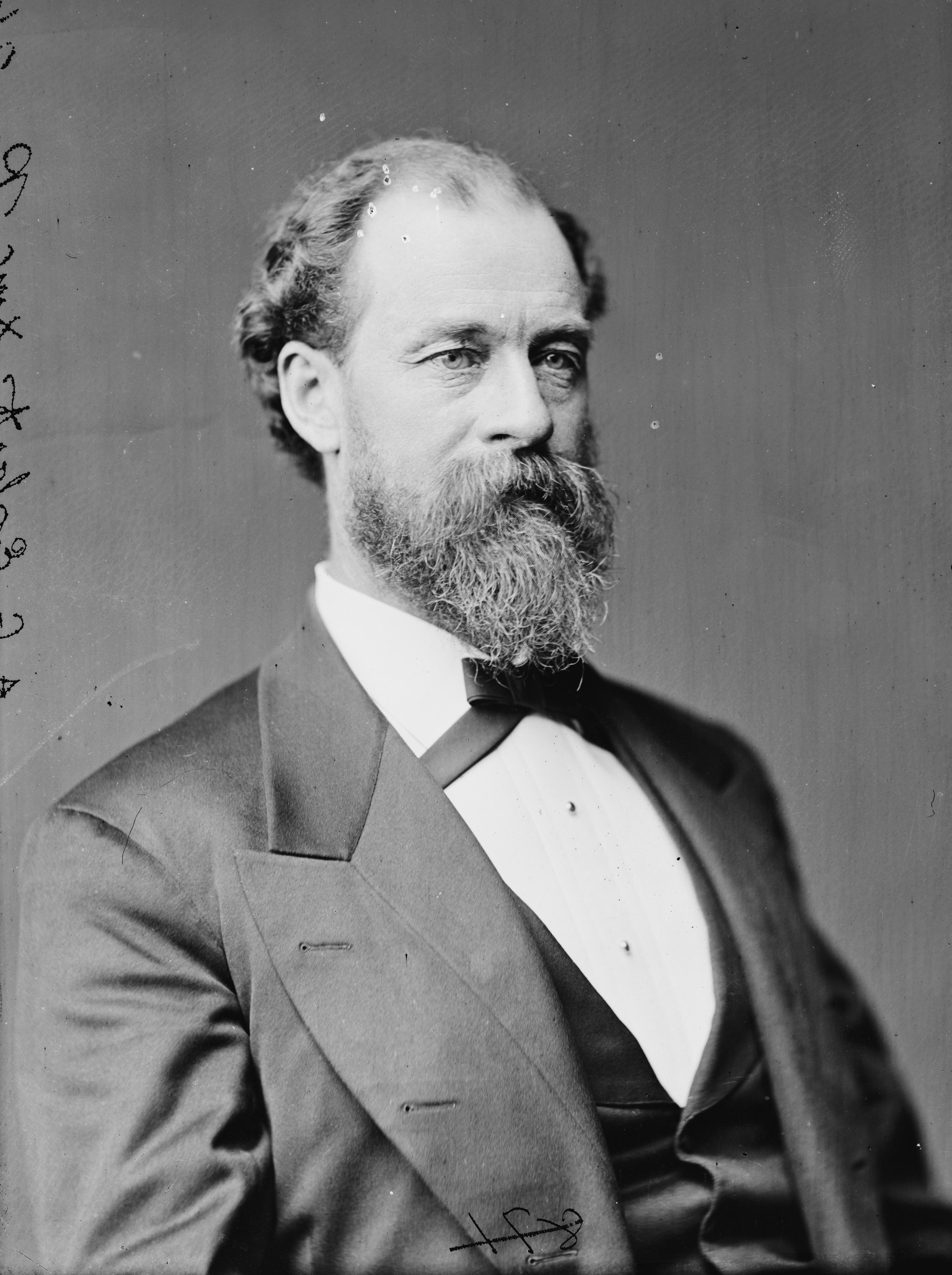

Member of the U.S. House of Representatives from Pennsylvania's 27th district
- In office March 4, 1875 – March 3, 1877
- Preceded by: See below
- Succeeded by: Lewis Findlay Watson

Personal details
- Born: April 13, 1828 Sandy Lake, Pennsylvania
- Died: March 28, 1896 (aged 67) Franklin, Pennsylvania
- Party: Democratic

Albert Gallatin Egbert (April 13, 1828 – March 28, 1896) was a Democratic member of the U.S. House of Representatives from Pennsylvania.

== Biography ==
Albert G. Egbert was born near Sandy Lake, Pennsylvania. He attended the public schools and Grand River Institute in Austinburg, Ohio. He graduated from the medical department of the Western Reserve University in Cleveland, Ohio, in 1856 and then practiced medicine in Clintonville, Pennsylvania. He moved to Cherrytree, Pennsylvania, and practiced his profession until 1861, when he retired in order to devote his entire time to the production of oil and agricultural pursuits. During the American Civil War, he served as a volunteer surgeon.

Egbert was elected as a Democrat to the Forty-fourth Congress. He served as chairman of the United States House Committee on Mileage during this Congress. He declined to be a candidate for renomination in 1876. He resumed his former business pursuits, and died in Franklin, Pennsylvania. Interment in Franklin Cemetery.

U.S. House of Representatives
Preceded by At-large on a general ticket: Charles Albright, Glenni W. Scofield, Lemuel Todd	Member of the U.S. House of Representatives from Pennsylvania's 27th congressional district 1875–1877	Succeeded by Lewis F. Watson
