= S. Taylor North =

American politician (1853–1917)

Solomon Taylor North
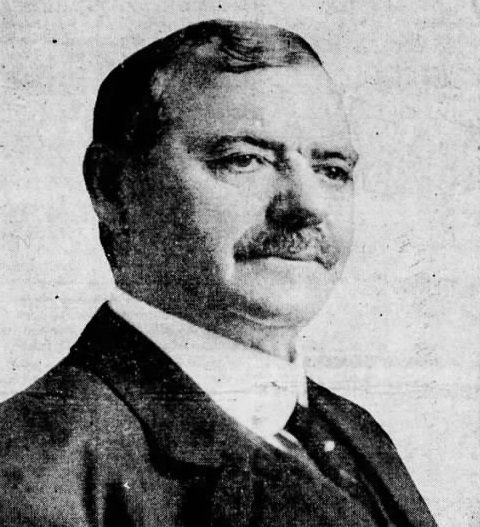
- From the May 5, 1916 edition of The Brockwayville Record

Member of the U.S. House of Representatives from Pennsylvania's 27th district
- In office March 4, 1915 – March 3, 1917
- Preceded by: J. N. Langham
- Succeeded by: Nathan Leroy Strong

Personal details
- Born: May 24, 1853 Jefferson County, Pennsylvania, US
- Died: October 19, 1917 (aged 64) Punxsutawney, Pennsylvania, US
- Party: Republican

Solomon Taylor North (May 24, 1853 – October 19, 1917) was a Republican member of the U.S. House of Representatives from Pennsylvania.

Solomon T. North, usually referred to as S. Taylor North or S. T. North, was born in Jefferson County, Pennsylvania. He taught school for six years and served as a school director for twenty years. He also worked as a lumber merchant, farmer, and banker. He was a member of the Pennsylvania National Guard. He was a delegate to the Republican State Convention in 1898. He served as director of the Punxsutawney National Bank and a member of the board of education. He was a member of the Pennsylvania State House of Representatives from 1905 to 1907, 1911, and 1913.

North was elected as a Republican to the Sixty-fourth Congress. He was an unsuccessful candidate for renomination in 1916. He died near Punxsutawney, Pennsylvania. Interment in Circle Hill Cemetery.

== Sources ==
- United States Congress. "Solomon T. North (id: N000141)". Biographical Directory of the United States Congress.
- The Political Graveyard

U.S. House of Representatives
Preceded by J. N. Langham	Member of the U.S. House of Representatives from Pennsylvania's 27th congressional district 1915-1917	Succeeded by Nathan L. Strong
