= Pennsylvania's 27th congressional district =

Former U.S. House district in Pennsylvania

Coordinates: 40°20′N 80°05′W

- Obsolete district
- Created: 1875
- Eliminated: 1970
- Years active: 1875-1973

Pennsylvania's 27th congressional district was one of Pennsylvania's districts of the United States House of Representatives.

== List of representatives ==
| Representative | Party | Years | Cong ress | Electoral history |
|---|---|---|---|---|
District established March 4, 1875
| Albert G. Egbert (Franklin) | Democratic | March 4, 1875 – March 3, 1877 | 44th | Elected in 1874. Retired. |
| Lewis F. Watson (Warren) | Republican | March 4, 1877 – March 3, 1879 | 45th | Elected in 1876. [data missing] |
| James H. Osmer (Franklin) | Republican | March 4, 1879 – March 3, 1881 | 46th | Elected in 1878. Retired. |
| Lewis F. Watson (Warren) | Republican | March 4, 1881 – March 3, 1883 | 47th | Elected in 1880. [data missing] |
| Samuel M. Brainerd (Erie) | Republican | March 4, 1883 – March 3, 1885 | 48th | Elected in 1882. Lost renomination. |
| William L. Scott (Erie) | Democratic | March 4, 1885 – March 3, 1889 | 49th 50th | Elected in 1884. Re-elected in 1886. Renominated but declined to be a candidate because of the condition of his health. |
| Lewis F. Watson (Warren) | Republican | March 4, 1889 – August 25, 1890 | 51st | Elected in 1888. Died. |
| Vacant | | August 25, 1890 – November 4, 1890 | 51st | |
| Charles W. Stone (Warren) | Republican | November 4, 1890 – March 3, 1899 | 51st 52nd 53rd 54th 55th | Elected to finish Watson's term. Re-elected in 1890. Re-elected in 1892. Re-elected in 1894. Re-elected in 1896; Lost re-election. |
| Joseph C. Sibley (Franklin) | Democratic | March 4, 1899 – March 3, 1901 | 56th 57th | Elected in 1898. Re-elected in 1900. Redistricted to the 28th district. |
| Joseph C. Sibley (Franklin) | Republican | March 4, 1901 – March 3, 1903 | 56th 57th | Elected in 1898. Re-elected in 1900. Redistricted to the 28th district. |
| William O. Smith (Punxsutawney) | Republican | March 4, 1903 – March 3, 1907 | 58th 59th | Elected in 1902. Re-elected in 1904. Retired. |
| Joseph G. Beale (Leechburg) | Republican | March 4, 1907 – March 3, 1909 | 60th | Elected in 1906. Lost renomination. |
| J. N. Langham (Indiana) | Republican | March 4, 1909 – March 3, 1915 | 61st 62nd 63rd | Elected in 1908. Re-elected in 1910. Re-elected in 1912. Retired. |
| Solomon T. North (Punxsutawney) | Republican | March 4, 1915 – March 3, 1917 | 64th | Elected in 1914. Lost renomination. |
| Nathan L. Strong (Brookville) | Republican | March 4, 1917 – January 3, 1935 | 65th 66th 67th 68th 69th 70th 71st 72nd 73rd | Elected in 1916. Re-elected in 1918; Re-elected in 1920. Re-elected in 1922. Re-elected in 1924. Re-elected in 1926. Re-elected in 1928. Re-elected in 1930. Re-elected in 1932. Lost re-election. |
| Joseph Gray (Spangler) | Democratic | January 3, 1935 – January 3, 1939 | 74th 75th | Elected in 1934. Re-elected in 1936. Lost re-election. |
| Harve Tibbott (Ebensburg) | Republican | January 3, 1939 – January 3, 1945 | 76th 77th 78th | Elected in 1938. Re-elected in 1940. Re-elected in 1942. Redistricted to the 26th district. |
| Augustine B. Kelley (Greensburg) | Democratic | January 3, 1945 – January 3, 1953 | 79th 80th 81st 82nd | Redistricted from the 28th district and re-elected in 1944. Re-elected in 1946. Re-elected in 1948. Re-elected in 1950. Redistricted to the 21st district |
| James G. Fulton (Pittsburgh) | Republican | January 3, 1953 – October 6, 1971 | 83rd 84th 85th 86th 87th 88th 89th 90th 91st 92nd | Redistricted from the 31st district and re-elected in 1952. Re-elected in 1954. Re-elected in 1956. Re-elected in 1958. Re-elected in 1960. Re-elected in 1962. Re-elected in 1964. Re-elected in 1966. Re-elected in 1968. Re-elected in 1970. Died. |
| Vacant | | October 6, 1971 – April 25, 1972 | 92nd | |
| William S. Conover (Pittsburgh) | Republican | April 25, 1972 – January 3, 1973 | 92nd | Elected to finish Fulton's term. Lost renomination. |
District dissolved January 3, 1973
