= Charles W. Stone =

American politician (1843–1912)

Charles Warren Stone
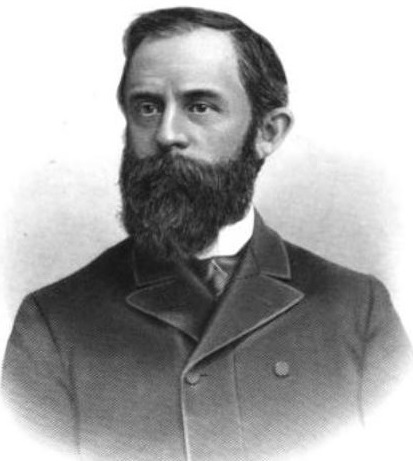

2nd Lieutenant Governor of Pennsylvania
- In office January 21, 1879 – January 16, 1883
- Governor: Henry M. Hoyt
- Preceded by: John Latta
- Succeeded by: Chauncey Forward Black

Member of the U.S. House of Representatives from Pennsylvania's 27th district
- In office November 4, 1890 – March 3, 1899
- Preceded by: Lewis F. Watson
- Succeeded by: Joseph C. Sibley

Member of the Pennsylvania Senate
- In office 1877–1878

Member of the Pennsylvania House of Representatives
- In office 1870–1871

Personal details
- Born: June 29, 1843
- Died: August 15, 1912 (aged 69)
- Party: Republican

Charles Warren Stone (June 29, 1843 – August 15, 1912) was a Republican member of the U.S. House of Representatives from Pennsylvania and the second lieutenant governor of Pennsylvania.

== Early life ==
Charles W. Stone was born near Groton, Massachusetts. He attended Lawrence Academy at Groton, and graduated from Williams College in Williamstown, Massachusetts, in 1863. He moved to Pennsylvania in 1863 and settled in Warren. He served as superintendent of schools of Warren County, Pennsylvania, in 1865. He studied law, was admitted to the bar in 1867 and commenced practice in Warren. He was a trustee of Pennsylvania State College.

== Personal life ==
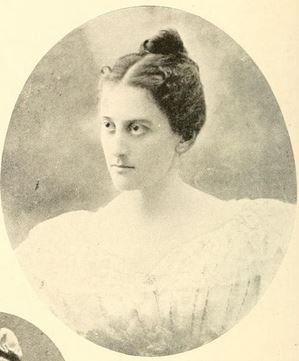
Ann Stone

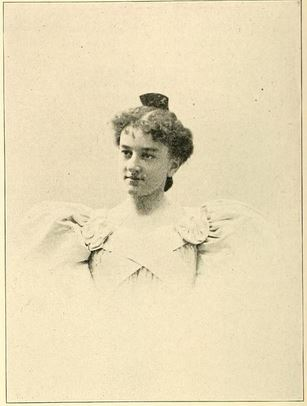
Bessie Stone

He married Lizzie Moorhead, a native of Erie, of which her father was one of the oldest citizens. She attended the Erie Academy, in which she afterwards taught. Stone taught in this academy, and it is in this way they met. They had 4 daughters and 2 sons. The eldest son acted as Stone's private secretary, and the youngest attended the preparatory department of Columbia College. The eldest daughter married Mr. Allen, of Warren. The second daughter, Ann, was an interesting young woman and a favorite in Washington society and attended school near Philadelphia and afterwards traveled in Europe. The third daughter, Bessie, attended Baltimore College.

== Career ==
Stone served as member of the Pennsylvania State House of Representatives in 1870 and 1871, and served in the Pennsylvania State Senate in 1877 and 1878. He was Lieutenant Governor of Pennsylvania during the term of Governor Henry M. Hoyt, from 1879 to 1883. He was appointed secretary of the Commonwealth on January 18, 1887, and served until his resignation to accept nomination for Congress.

Stone was elected as a Republican to the Fifty-first Congress to fill the vacancy caused by the death of Lewis F. Watson. He was reelected to the Fifty-second and to the three succeeding Congresses. He served as chairman of the United States House Committee on Coinage, Weights, and Measures during the Fifty-fourth and Fifty-fifth Congresses. He was an unsuccessful candidate for reelection in 1898. He was also an unsuccessful candidate for Governor of Pennsylvania in 1898. He resumed the practice of law and died at his home near Warren, Pennsylvania. Interment in Oakland Cemetery in Pleasant Township, Pennsylvania.

The Honorable Charles Warren Stone Museum was added to the National Register of Historic Places in 1976.

== Sources ==
- United States Congress. "Charles W. Stone (id: S000953)". Biographical Directory of the United States Congress.
- The Political Graveyard

Party political offices
Preceded by Arthur G. Olmsted	Republican nominee for Lieutenant Governor of Pennsylvania; 1878	Succeeded by William T. Davies
Political offices
Preceded by John Latta	Lieutenant Governor of Pennsylvania; 1879–1883	Succeeded by Chauncey Forward Black
U.S. House of Representatives
Preceded by Lewis F. Watson	Member of the U.S. House of Representatives from Pennsylvania's 27th congressional district 1890–1899	Succeeded by Joseph C. Sibley
