= Lewis F. Watson =

American politician

Lewis Findlay Watson
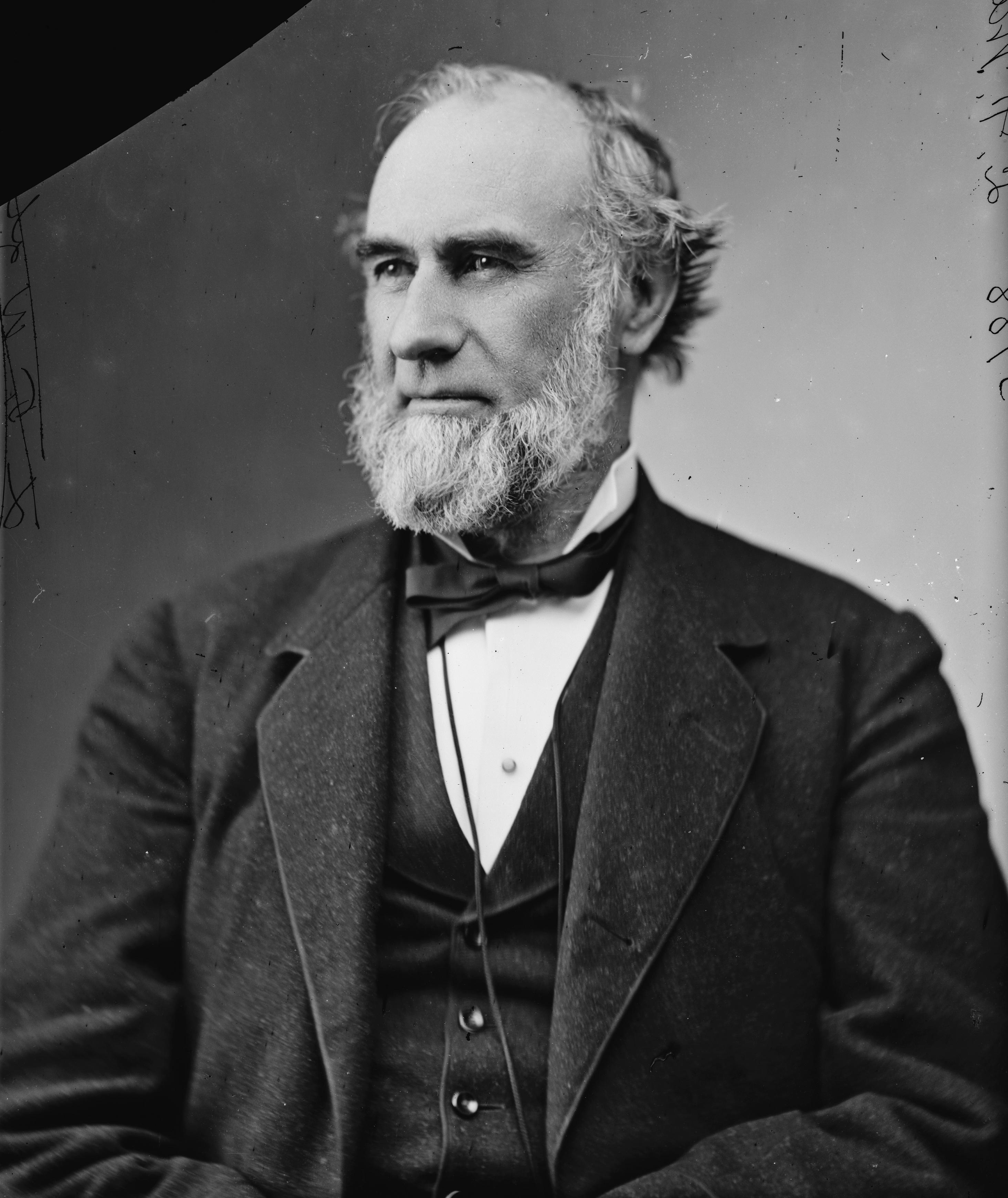

Member of the U.S. House of Representatives from Pennsylvania's 27th district
- In office March 4, 1889 – August 25, 1890
- Preceded by: William Lawrence Scott
- Succeeded by: Charles Warren Stone
- In office March 4, 1881 – March 4, 1883
- Preceded by: James H. Osmer
- Succeeded by: Samuel Myron Brainerd
- In office March 4, 1877 – March 4, 1879
- Preceded by: Albert Gallatin Egbert
- Succeeded by: James H. Osmer

Personal details
- Born: April 14, 1819 Crawford County, Pennsylvania
- Died: August 25, 1890 (aged 71) Washington, D.C.
- Party: Democratic

Lewis Findlay Watson (April 14, 1819 – August 25, 1890) was a Republican member of the U.S. House of Representatives from Pennsylvania.

== Biography ==
Lewis Findlay Watson was born in Crawford County, Pennsylvania. He attended the common schools and engaged in mercantile pursuits at Titusville, Pennsylvania in 1832. He moved to Warren, Pennsylvania in 1835 and continued his former pursuits until 1837. He served as clerk in the office of the recorder in 1838. He studied law at the Warren Academy from 1839 to 1840. He resumed his former mercantile pursuits until 1860. He was engaged as an operator in lumber and in the production of petroleum from 1860 to 1875. He organized and was the first president of the Conewango Valley Railroad Co. in 1861. He was elected president of the Warren Savings Bank at its organization in 1870.

Watson was elected as a Republican to the Forty-fifth Congress. He was again elected to the Forty-seventh Congress. Finally, he was elected to the Fifty-first Congress and served until his death in Washington, D.C., in 1890. Interment in Oakland Cemetery in Warren, Pennsylvania.

== See also ==
- List of members of the United States Congress who died in office (1790–1899)

== Sources ==
- United States Congress. "Lewis F. Watson (id: W000204)". Biographical Directory of the United States Congress.
- The Political Graveyard

U.S. House of Representatives
Preceded by Albert G. Egbert	Member of the U.S. House of Representatives from Pennsylvania's 27th congressional district 1877–1879	Succeeded by James H. Osmer
Preceded by James H. Osmer	Member of the U.S. House of Representatives from Pennsylvania's 27th congressional district 1881–1883	Succeeded by Samuel M. Brainerd
Preceded by William L. Scott	Member of the U.S. House of Representatives from Pennsylvania's 27th congressional district 1889–1890	Succeeded by Charles W. Stone
