= J. N. Langham =

American politician

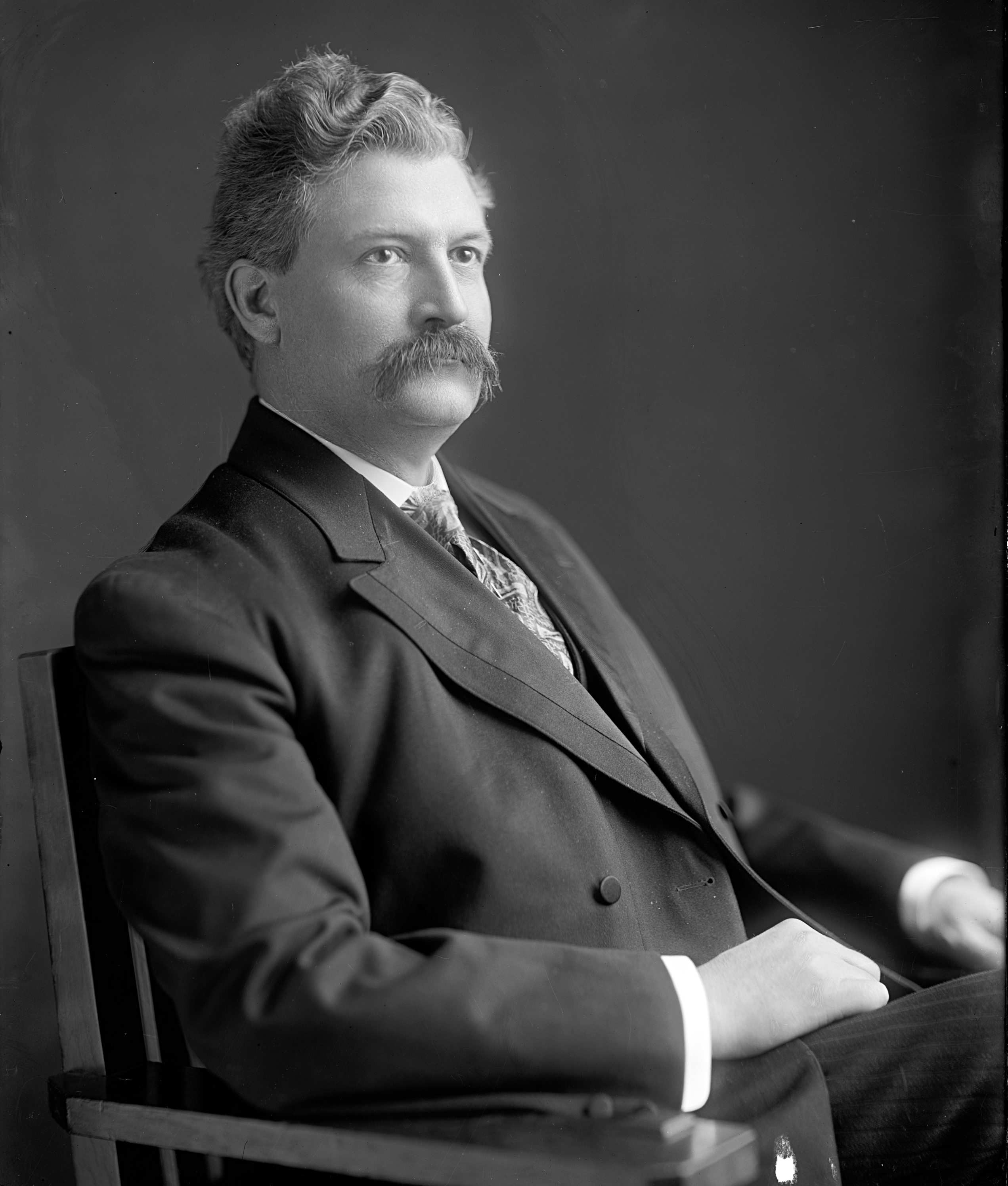

Member of the U.S. House of Representatives from Pennsylvania's 27th district
- In office March 4, 1909 – March 3, 1915
- Preceded by: Joseph G. Beale
- Succeeded by: Solomon T. North

Personal details
- Born: Jonathan Nicholas Langham; August 4, 1861 Hillsdale, Pennsylvania, U.S.
- Died: May 21, 1945 (aged 83) Indiana, Pennsylvania, U.S.
- Resting place: Oakland Cemetery
- Party: Republican
- Education: State Normal School

Jonathan Nicholas Langham (August 4, 1861 – May 21, 1945) was an American lawyer and politician who served three terms as a Republican member of the U.S. House of Representatives from Pennsylvania from 1909 to 1915.

== Biography ==
Langham was born near Hillsdale, Pennsylvania. He taught school, and graduated from the State Normal School at Indiana, Pennsylvania, in 1882. He studied law, was admitted to the Indiana County, Pennsylvania bar in December 1888 and commenced practice in Indiana, Pennsylvania.

=== Early career ===
He served as postmaster of Indiana, Pennsylvania, from 1892 to 1893, as assistant United States attorney for the western district of Pennsylvania from 1898 to 1904, and as chief clerk and corporation deputy in the auditor general's department of Pennsylvania from 1904 to 1909.

=== Congress ===
Langham was elected as a Republican to the Sixty-first, Sixty-Second, and Sixty-third Congresses. He was not a candidate for renomination in 1914.

=== Later career ===
In 1915 he was elected judge of the court of common pleas for the fortieth judicial district of Pennsylvania for a term of ten years, reelected in 1925 and served until his retirement in January 1936.

=== Death and burial ===
He died in Indiana, Pennsylvania, in 1945 at the age of 83. His remains were interred in Oakland Cemetery.

== Sources ==
- United States Congress. "J. N. Langham (id: L000071)". Biographical Directory of the United States Congress.
- The Political Graveyard

U.S. House of Representatives
Preceded by Joseph G. Beale	Member of the U.S. House of Representatives from Pennsylvania's 27th congressional district 1909–1915	Succeeded by Solomon T. North
