= James G. Fulton =

American politician (1903–1971)

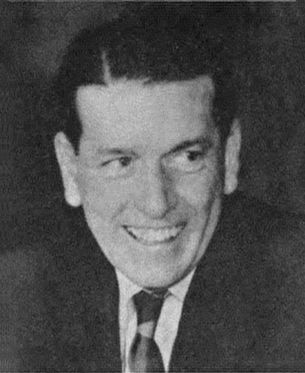

Member of the U.S. House of Representatives from Pennsylvania
- In office January 3, 1945 – October 6, 1971
- Preceded by: Herman P. Eberharter
- Succeeded by: William Sheldrick Conover
- Constituency: 31st district (1945–1953); 27th district (1953–1971)

Member of the Pennsylvania Senate
- In office 1939–1940

Personal details
- Born: March 1, 1903 Dormont, Pennsylvania, U.S.
- Died: October 6, 1971 (aged 68) Washington, D.C., U.S.
- Party: Republican
- Education: Carnegie Institute of Technology; Pennsylvania State College; Harvard Law School

Military service
- Allegiance: United States
- Branch/service: United States Navy
- Rank: Lieutenant
- Battles/wars: World War II

James Grove (Jim) Fulton (March 1, 1903 – October 6, 1971) was an American politician who served as a member of the U.S. House of Representatives from Pennsylvania from 1945 to 1971.

== Early life and education ==
James G. Fulton was born in Dormont, Pennsylvania. He attended the Fine Arts Department of the Carnegie Institute of Technology in Pittsburgh, Pennsylvania, and graduated from Pennsylvania State College at State College, Pennsylvania, in 1924 and from Harvard Law School as a Doctor of Laws in 1927. He was a member of the Allegheny County Board of Law Examiners from 1934 to 1942. He served in the Pennsylvania State Senate in 1939 and 1940. He was solicitor for Dormont Borough in 1942. He worked as publisher of the Mount Lebanon News and several other newspapers. He was a member of the American Judicature Society, United World Federalists, American Legion and Veterans of Foreign Wars.

=== Military service ===
During the Second World War he enlisted in the United States Naval Reserve in 1942 and served in the South Pacific as a lieutenant until discharged in 1945.

== United States House of Representatives ==
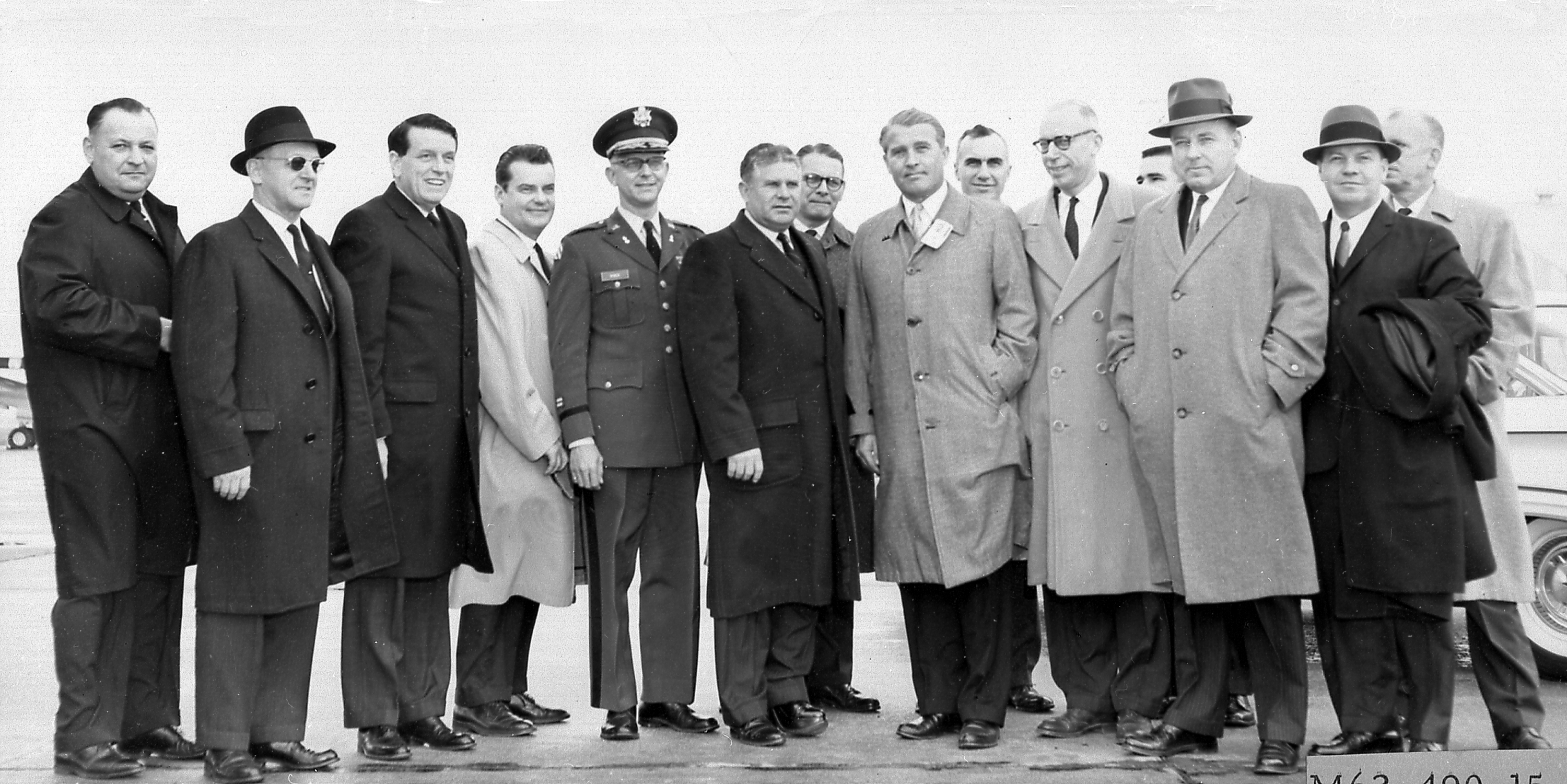
Representative Fulton and other members of the House Committee on Science and Astronautics visit the Marshall Space Flight Center on March 9, 1962, to gather first-hand information of the nation's space exploration program.

In 1944, while still in the service, Fulton was elected as a Republican to the 79th United States Congress, and reelected to the 13 succeeding Congresses, serving from January 3, 1945, until his death from a heart attack in Washington, D.C., on October 6, 1971. While in Congress he was delegated to the United Nations Conference on Trade and Employment at Havana in 1947 and 1948, and to the 14th General Assembly of United Nations in 1959. He was a delegate to 1956 Republican National Convention. In addition he served as an adviser on space to the United States Mission at the United Nations from 1960 to 1969. Fulton voted in favor of the Civil Rights Acts of 1957, 1960, 1964, and 1968, as well as the 24th Amendment to the U.S. Constitution and the Voting Rights Act of 1965.

During his time in Congress, Fulton had a mostly liberal voting record.

=== Space Shuttle ===
Fulton is credited with saving the Space Shuttle program. After a heart attack in 1970, Fulton emerged from an ambulance to propose a compromise that eventually saved the funding for the program.

== Legacy ==
He died of a heart attack on October 6, 1971, in Washington, D.C. He is buried in Mt. Lebanon Cemetery in Pittsburgh, Pennsylvania.

As a memorial to Fulton, the Pittsburgh Foundation has created The James G. Fulton Legislative Internship Program in his honor.

The Congressman James Grove Fulton Memorial Post Office Building in Pittsburgh is named after him.

== See also ==
- List of members of the United States Congress who died in office (1950–1999)

== Notes ==
U.S. House of Representatives
Preceded by Herman P. Eberharter	Member of the U.S. House of Representatives from Pennsylvania's 31st congressional district 1945–1953	Succeeded by District Eliminated
Preceded by Augustine B. Kelley	Member of the U.S. House of Representatives from Pennsylvania's 27th congressional district 1953–1971	Succeeded by William S. Conover
