= William Lawrence Scott =

American politician

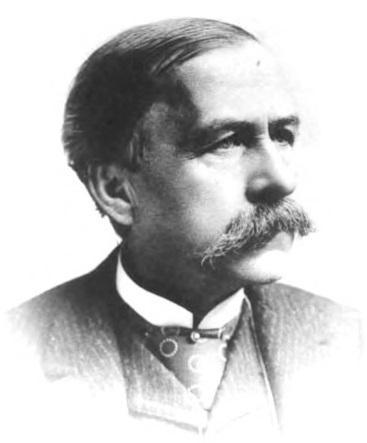

Member of the U.S. House of Representatives from Pennsylvania's 27th district
- In office March 4, 1885 – March 3, 1889
- Preceded by: Samuel M. Brainerd
- Succeeded by: Lewis F. Watson

10th and 12th Mayor of Erie, Pennsylvania
- In office January 1, 1871 – December 31, 1871
- Preceded by: Orange Noble
- Succeeded by: Charles Manning Reed
- In office January 1, 1866 – December 31, 1866
- Preceded by: F. F. Farrar
- Succeeded by: Orange Noble

Personal details
- Born: July 2, 1828 Washington, D.C.
- Died: September 19, 1891 (aged 63) Newport, Rhode Island
- Party: Democratic
- Spouse: Mary Matilda Tracy
- Relations: Gustavus Scott (grandfather)
- Parent(s): Robert Scott; Mary Ann Lewis
- Education: Hampden-Sydney College

William Lawrence Scott (July 2, 1828 – September 19, 1891) was a Democratic member of the U.S. House of Representatives from Pennsylvania, a prominent railroad executive, as well as a prominent horse breeder and horse racer.

== Early life ==
William Lawrence Scott was born on July 2, 1828, in Washington, D.C., to Mary Ann Lewis (died 1879) and Colonel Robert Scott (U.S. Army) (1798–1835), of Virginia, a graduate of the United States Military Academy at West Point, who was detailed to the nation's capital at the time of his son's birth. Scott's Father died when he was only about seven years old. His elder brother, Robert Wainright Scott (1827–1866), was educated at the Naval Academy at Annapolis, served with distinction in the U.S. Civil War, and died while commander of the USS Saginaw at Acapulco, Mexico, on January 5, 1866.

His paternal grandfather was Gustavus Scott (1753–1800), a colonial lawyer and public official from Maryland who was appointed by President Washington the first Commissioner of Public Buildings for the City of Washington. His maternal grandfather was Col. Henry Lewis of Virginia, a Judge.

He attended the common schools and Hampden-Sydney College in Virginia.

== Career ==
From 1840 to 1846, Scott served as a United States House of Representatives Page. After returning to Erie, Pennsylvania, with Charles Manning Reed, at the end of Reed's term in the U.S. Congress, he was employed as a shipping clerk at Reed's lakeside wharves for several years. He then spent some years traveling, working as a peddler, fisherman, and clerk until he was 23 years old.

Scott became a prosperous land owner, investor, and businessman engaged in shipping, coal mining, iron manufacturing, banking, and railroad construction through various partnerships and the firm of W. L. Scott & Co., which he established around 1871. One trade at the New York Stock Exchange was said to have earned him $2 million. His fortune was estimated at $15 million. He served as president of a number of railroad companies, including the New York, Pennsylvania, and Norfolk Railroad and the Erie and Pittsburgh Railroad.

=== Political career ===
Scott was elected mayor of Erie in 1866 and again in 1871. He served as a member of the Democratic National Committee from 1876 to 1884, and was appointed again in 1886. He was a delegate to the Democratic National Conventions in 1868, 1876, 1880, and 1888. Scott was considered a possible choice for United States Secretary of the Treasury under Grover Cleveland.

Scott was elected as a Democrat to the Forty-ninth and Fiftieth Congresses. He served as chairman of the United States House Committee on Expenditures in the Department of the Navy during the Fiftieth Congress. He was renominated in 1888 and again in 1890 but each time declined to be a candidate due to his health.

As the reportedly wealthiest member of the House of Representatives at the time, and a close friend of President Grover Cleveland, Scott did a great deal of entertaining at Scott House, which overlooked Old Plantation Creek. Scott had a passion for race horses and his farm had facilities, including a one-mile (1.6 km) race track, to breed and winter 35 northern-owned race horses.

=== Horse breeding ===
In June 1883, Scott bought the 2,650-acre (10.7 km^{2}) Hollywood Farm on the Chesapeake Bay in Virginia from the heirs of the late Governor Littleton Tazewell for $55,000. His purchase included the Tazewell house which became known as the Scott House after he renovated and enlarged it in 1886. Scott bought the land primarily to establish a terminus, a harbor and a town for the services of his railroad, the New York, Pennsylvania and Norfolk. Scott immediately deeded part of his 2,650-acre (10.7 km^{2}) purchase to the railroad and the following year, in 1884, he laid out the Town of Cape Charles, Virginia, on 135 acres (0.55 km^{2}).

He established the Algeria Stock Farm in Erie, purchasing for $30,000 the French champion Rayon d'Or (the leading sire in North America in 1889) and a stock of high bred broodmares. Scott maintained a farm for yearlings in St. Charles, Maryland. Scott's horse Chaos won the Futurity Stakes in 1889. Scott was a stockholder and member of the board of the racetracks owned by the Coney Island Jockey Club, the Monmouth Park Association, and the Brooklyn Jockey Club.

== Personal life ==
In 1853, he was married to Mary Matilda Tracy (d. 1898), eldest daughter of John A. Tracy, an attorney in Erie, and the sister of Frank F. Tracy, a prominent member of the New York Stock Exchange and one-time president of the Chicago, Rock Island and Pacific Railroad. Together, they had:

- Mary Scott (d. 1931), who married Richard H. Townsend (1850–1902), the President of the Erie and Pittsburgh Railroad
- Annie Wainwright Scott (1859–1928), who married Charles Hamot Strong (1853–1936), grandson of Pierre Simon Vincent Hamot, in 1881. Scott built the couple a 46-room mansion, completed in 1893, two years after his death.

Scott died from heart failure on September 19, 1891, in Newport, Rhode Island. His body was buried at Erie Cemetery. He was interred in a mausoleum designed by E.L. Pelton, an Erie architect, completed in 1889 at a cost of $40,000 (equivalent to $1,400,000 in 2025).

At the time of his death, his wealth was estimated at $15,000,000 (equivalent to $537,000,000 in 2025) to $25,000,000 (equivalent to $896,000,000 in 2025). In December 1891, the value of the estate was estimated at no more than $7,000,000 (equivalent to $251,000,000 in 2025), all of which was left to his family.

=== Descendants ===
Through his eldest daughter, he was the grandfather of Mathilde Scott Townsend (1885–1949), who was married to Peter Goelet Gerry (1879–1957), the son of Elbridge Thomas Gerry (1837–1927) and great-grandson of Elbridge Gerry (1744–1814), the fifth Vice President of the United States. They divorced in 1925 and later that same year, she married Sumner Welles (1892–1961), the Under Secretary of State from 1937 to 1943 during Franklin D. Roosevelt's presidency.

Through his second daughter, he was the grandfather of Matilda Thora Wainwright Strong (1882–1939), who married Reginald Ronalds (1865–1924), the son of Fanny Ronalds, on February 24, 1906. They divorced in 1910 and she was later married to Clyde B. Leasure from June 28, 1917, until December 23, 1921.

U.S. House of Representatives
| Preceded by Samuel M. Brainerd | Member of the U.S. House of Representatives from Pennsylvania's 27th congressional district 1885 - 1889 | Succeeded by Lewis F. Watson |
