= James H. Osmer =

American politician

Lewis Findlay Watson
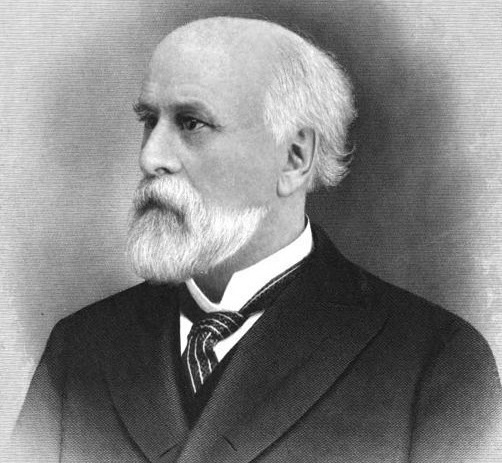

Member of the U.S. House of Representatives from Pennsylvania's 27th district
- In office March 4, 1879 – March 3, 1881
- Preceded by: Lewis Findlay Watson
- Succeeded by: Lewis Findlay Watson

Personal details
- Born: January 23, 1832 Tenterden, Kent
- Died: October 3, 1912 (aged 80) Franklin, Pennsylvania
- Party: Republican

James H. Osmer (January 23, 1832 – October 3, 1912) was a Republican member of the U.S. House of Representatives from Pennsylvania.

James H. Osmer was born in Tenterden, Kent, England.

As an infant his parents immigrated to the United States and settled near Bellefonte, Pennsylvania. He attended private schools, Bellefonte Academy in Centre County, Pennsylvania, Mount Pleasant College in Westmoreland County, Pennsylvania, and Pennsylvania and Dickinson Seminary in Williamsport, Pennsylvania.

He studied law at Elmira, New York. He was admitted to the bar of the supreme court of New York at Cortland, New York, in 1858 and practiced at Horseheads, New York, near Elmira, until 1865, when he moved to Franklin, Pennsylvania, where he was admitted to the bar and practiced. He was a delegate to the 1876 Republican National Convention. He was a delegate to several State conventions.

Osmer was elected as a Republican to the Forty-sixth Congress. He was not a candidate for renomination in 1880. He continued the practice of his profession in Franklin until his death in 1912, aged 80. He was interred in Franklin Cemetery.

== Sources ==
- United States Congress. "James H. Osmer (id: O000119)". Biographical Directory of the United States Congress.
- The Political Graveyard

U.S. House of Representatives
Preceded by Lewis F. Watson	Member of the U.S. House of Representatives from Pennsylvania's 27th congressional district 1879-1881	Succeeded by Lewis F. Watson
