= Nathan L. Strong =

American politician

Nathan Leroy Strong
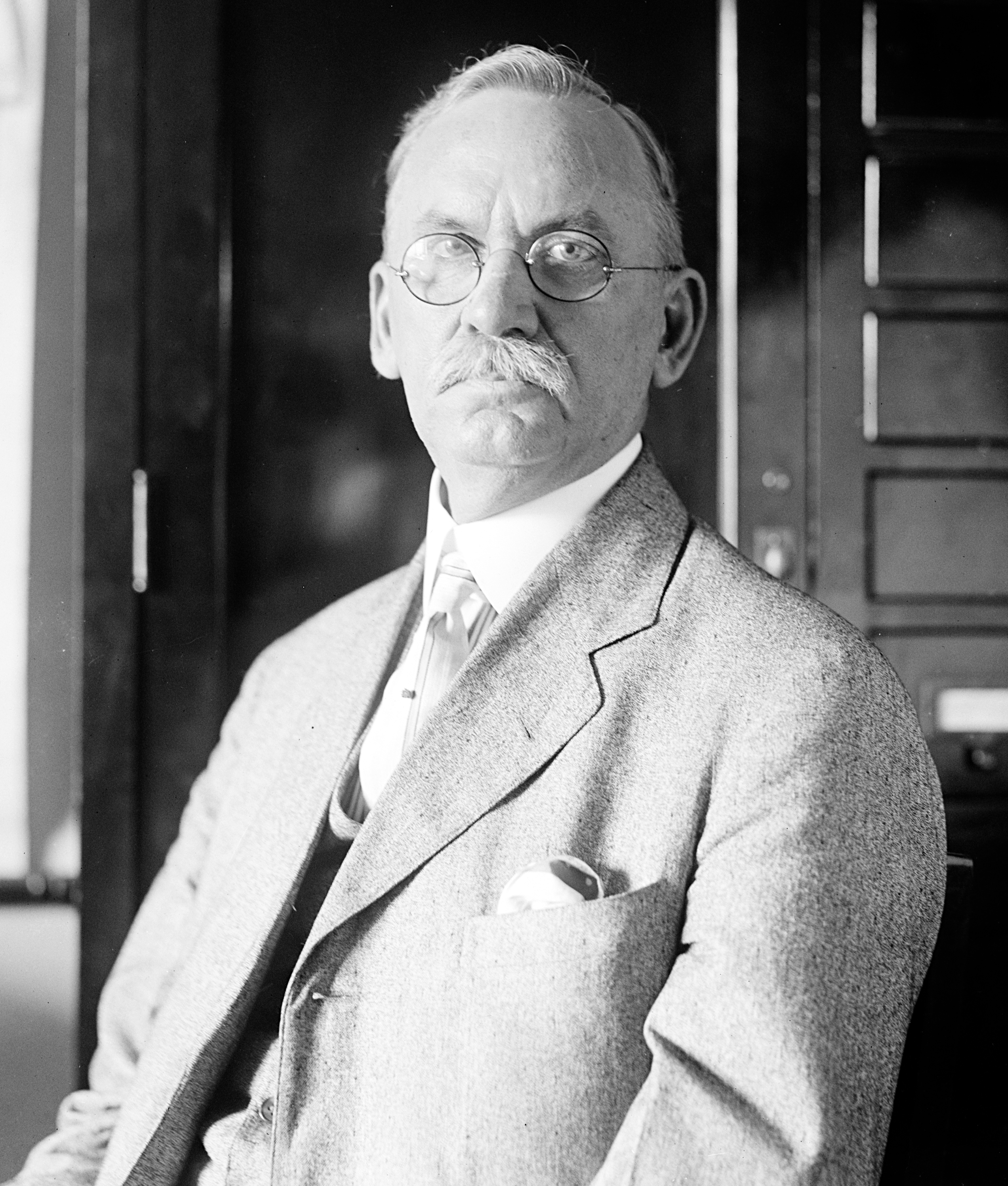

Member of the U.S. House of Representatives from Pennsylvania's 27th district
- In office March 4, 1917 – January 3, 1935
- Preceded by: Solomon Taylor North
- Succeeded by: Joseph Anthony Gray

Personal details
- Born: November 12, 1859 Troy, Pennsylvania, U.S.
- Died: December 14, 1939 (aged 80) Brookville, Pennsylvania, U.S.
- Party: Republican

Nathan Leroy Strong (November 12, 1859 – December 14, 1939) was a Republican member of the U.S. House of Representatives from Pennsylvania.

== Biography ==
Born in Troy (now Summerville), Jefferson County, Pennsylvania on November 12, 1859, Nathan L. Strong worked as a telegraph operator and railroad agent from 1877 to 1894. He studied law, was admitted to the bar in 1891 and commenced practice in Brookville, Pennsylvania, in 1893.

Strong served as district attorney of Jefferson County from 1895 to 1900. He was then engaged in the development of mineral lands in Jefferson and Armstrong Counties from 1901 to 1916, and served as president of the Mohawk Mining Company. He was also engaged in banking.

Strong was elected as a Republican to the Sixty-fifth and to the eight succeeding Congresses. He was an unsuccessful candidate for reelection in 1934. After he left Congress, he resumed his former business activities.

== Death and interment ==
Strong died in Brookville on December 14, 1939, and was interred in the Brookville Cemetery.

U.S. House of Representatives
Preceded by Solomon T. North	Member of the U.S. House of Representatives from Pennsylvania's 27th congressional district 1917 - 1935	Succeeded by Joseph Gray
