= John Latta (politician) =

American politician

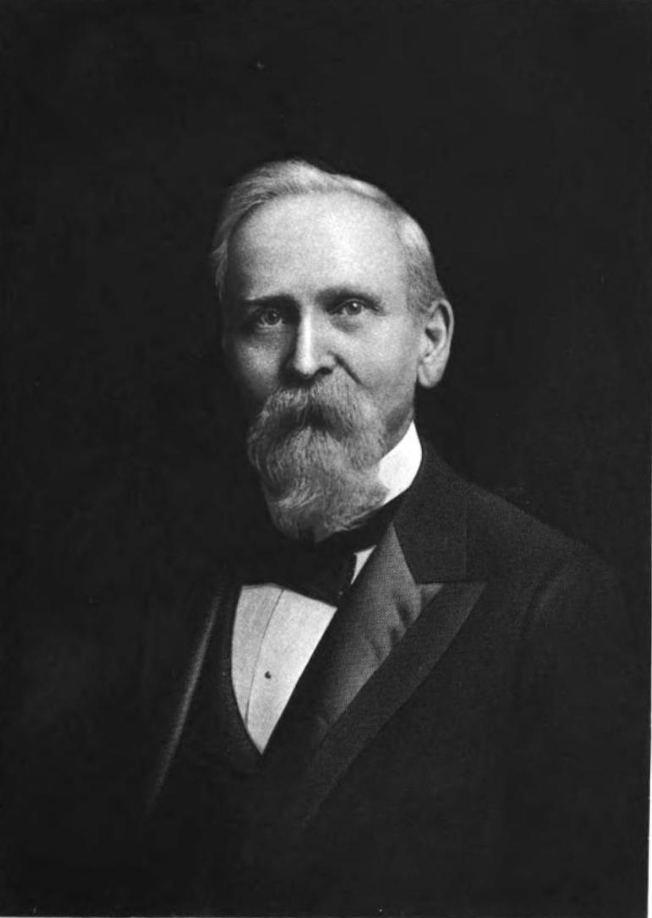

1st Lieutenant Governor of Pennsylvania
- In office January 19, 1875 – January 21, 1879
- Governor: John F. Hartranft
- Preceded by: Office established
- Succeeded by: Charles Warren Stone

Member of the Pennsylvania House of Representatives
- In office 1872-1873

Member of the Pennsylvania Senate for the 23rd district
- In office 1865-1866

Member of the Pennsylvania Senate for the 22nd district
- In office 1863-1864

Personal details
- Born: March 2, 1836 Unity Township, Pennsylvania
- Died: February 15, 1913 (aged 76) Greensburg, Pennsylvania
- Party: Democratic

John Latta (March 2, 1836 – February 15, 1913) was an American lawyer and politician from Pennsylvania who served as the first lieutenant governor of Pennsylvania from 1875 to 1879. He also served as a Democratic member of the Pennsylvania House of Representatives from 1872 to 1873 and the Pennsylvania Senate from 1863 to 1866.

== Early life ==
Latta was born in Unity Township, Pennsylvania, to Moses and Eliza (Graham) Latta. He was educated at Sewickley Academy and Elder's Ridge Academy. He read law under D.H. Hazen in Pittsburgh, entered Yale Law School in 1857 and graduated in 1859. He was admitted to the Westmoreland County bar in 1859 and opened a law firm in Greensburg, Pennsylvania. In 1865, he married Emma Hope and together they had 4 children. He was a member of Christ's Church in Greensburg.

== Career ==
He served as a member of the Pennsylvania Senate for the 22nd district 1863 to 1864 and for the 23rd district from 1865 to 1866. He served as a member of the Pennsylvania House of Representatives from 1872 to 1873. Under the new Pennsylvania Constitution that went into effect on 1 January 1874, he was the first elected lieutenant governor and served under Republican Governor John Hartranft.

He died on February 15, 1913, in Greensburg, Pennsylvania.

Party political offices
First	Democratic nominee for Lieutenant Governor of Pennsylvania; 1874	Succeeded by John Fertig
Pennsylvania State Senate
Preceded by Smith Fuller	Member of the Pennsylvania Senate, 22nd district 1863-1864	Succeeded by Thomas St. Clair
Preceded by William Hopkins	Member of the Pennsylvania Senate, 23rd district 1865-1866	Succeeded by Miles S. Humphreys
Pennsylvania House of Representatives
Preceded by	Member of the Pennsylvania House of Representatives; 1872-1873	Succeeded by
Political offices
Preceded by Position created	Lieutenant Governor of Pennsylvania; 1875–1879	Succeeded by Charles W. Stone
