= William S. Conover =

American politician (1928–2022)

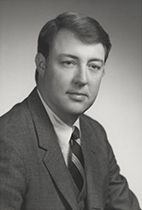

Member of the U.S. House of Representatives from Pennsylvania's 27th district
- In office April 25, 1972 – January 3, 1973
- Preceded by: James G. Fulton
- Succeeded by: District eliminated

Personal details
- Born: William Sheldrick Conover; August 27, 1928 Richmond, Virginia, U.S.
- Died: October 7, 2022 (aged 94) Pittsburgh, Pennsylvania, U.S.
- Party: Republican

Military service
- Branch/service: United States Navy
- Years of service: 1952–1954
- Rank: Lieutenant (jg.)

William Sheldrick Conover II (August 27, 1928 – October 7, 2022) was a Republican member of the U.S. House of Representatives from Pennsylvania.

Conover was born in Richmond, Virginia. He graduated from Lake Forest High School in Lake Forest, Illinois, in 1946. He received his B.S. from Northwestern University in Evanston, Illinois, in 1950. He served as a lieutenant (jg.) in the United States Navy from 1952 to 1954. He was president of the Mt. Lebanon Young Republicans from 1959 to 1960, and president of the Upper St. Clair Republican Club from 1965 to 1966. He was president and owner of Conover & Associates, Inc., insurance brokers in Pittsburgh, Pennsylvania.

On April 25, 1972, Conover was elected as a Republican to the Ninety-second Congress, by special election, to fill the vacancy caused by the death of United States Representative James G. Fulton. He defeated future Congressman Doug Walgren in the special election for the 27th district consisting of the suburbs south of Pittsburgh. However, on the same day, he was an unsuccessful candidate for nomination in the Republican primary for the 22nd district being defeated by James R. Montgomery. The state had undergone its decennial redistricting and his home was placed into a district consisting of the southwestern corner of Pennsylvania. He resumed business interests in Pittsburgh following the expiration of his term. Conover died on October 7, 2022.

U.S. House of Representatives
Preceded by James G. Fulton	Member of the U.S. House of Representatives from Pennsylvania's 27th congressional district 1972–1973	Succeeded by District eliminated
