= Samuel Myron Brainerd =

American politician (1842–1898)

Member of the U.S. House of Representatives from Pennsylvania's 27th district
- In office March 4, 1883 – March 3, 1885
- Preceded by: Lewis F. Watson
- Succeeded by: William L. Scott

Personal details
- Born: November 13, 1842 Albion, Pennsylvania, U.S.
- Died: November 21, 1898 (aged 56) Erie, Pennsylvania, U.S.
- Resting place: Erie Cemetery, Erie, Pennsylvania, U.S.
- Party: Republican
- Spouse: Ida Elizabeth Liddle
- Children: 4
- Parent(s): Samuel Brainerd; Olive Livingston Nicholson
- Education: Edinboro Normal School; University of Michigan Law School
- Profession: Politician, lawyer

Samuel Myron Brainerd (November 13, 1842 – November 21, 1898) was an American politician and lawyer who served a single term in the United States House of Representatives, representing the 29th congressional district of Pennsylvania from 1883 to 1885 as a Republican in the 48th United States Congress.

== Early life and education ==
Brainerd was born in Albion, Pennsylvania, on November 13, 1842, to Samuel Brainerd and Olive Livingston Nicholson. He attended public schools, Edinboro Normal School, and the University of Michigan Law School.

== Career ==
Brainerd was admitted to the bar in 1869; he commenced practice in North East, Pennsylvania.

Brainerd served as district attorney of Erie County, Pennsylvania, from 1872 to 1875. In 1874, he moved to Erie, Pennsylvania, where he continued practicing law. Brainerd served as chairman of the Republican county committee in 1880.

Brainerd was elected to a single term in the United States House of Representatives. He represented the 29th congressional district of Pennsylvania from 1883 to 1885 as a Republican in the 48th United States Congress.

Brainerd's time in office began on March 4, 1883, and concluded on March 3, 1885. He was an unsuccessful candidate for renomination in 1884.

Following his tenure in Congress, Brainerd resumed practicing law in Erie, Pennsylvania until his death in 1898.

== Personal life and death ==
Brainerd was married to Ida Elizabeth Liddle, with whom he had four children.

Brainerd died at the age of 56 in Erie, Pennsylvania on November 21, 1898. He was interred in Erie Cemetery.

== See also ==
- List of United States representatives who served a single term

U.S. House of Representatives
Preceded by Lewis F. Watson	Member of the U.S. House of Representatives from Pennsylvania's 27th congressional district 1883–1885	Succeeded by William L. Scott
