= Erie and Pittsburgh Railroad =

Overview
- Dates of operation: 1860–1870
- Successor: Pennsylvania Railroad

Technical
- Length: 83 miles (134 km)

The Erie and Pittsburgh Railroad was a railroad based in Erie, Pennsylvania incorporated on April 1, 1858. Operations began in March 1860. It operated jointly with Buffalo and State Line Railroad from an indeterminate date until February 28, 1870, in connection with the latter's commitment, along with the Erie and North East Railroad, to complete track construction between Jamestown, Pennsylvania, and Girard, Pennsylvania. The railroad was leased as of April 1, 1870, by the Pennsylvania Railroad.

William Lawrence Scott, trustee for EPR and the Pennsylvania Railroad, bought the Erie Canal Company (owner of the Erie Extension Canal) at a sheriff's sale on November 29, 1870. The deed was conveyed to EPR as of March 22, 1871.

EPR held stock in Pennsylvania Railroad and Pittsburgh, Bessemer and Lake Erie Railroad.

EPR operated 83 miles (134 km) of track:

- Girard Junction to Jamestown, Pennsylvania; 40 miles (64 km)
- Greenville, Pennsylvania to the Shenango River
- Clarksville to Sharpsville, Pennsylvania; 9 miles (14 km)
- Jamestown to New Castle, Pennsylvania; 31 miles (50 km)
- Dock Junction to Erie, Pennsylvania; 3 miles (4.8 km)
