= James J. Davidson =

American politician and businessman

James Davidson

Member-elect of the U.S. House of Representatives from Pennsylvania's 25th district
- Died before taking office
- Preceded by: Thomas Phillips
- Succeeded by: Joseph Showalter

Personal details
- Born: November 5, 1861 Connellsville, Pennsylvania, U.S.
- Died: January 2, 1897 (aged 35) Phoenix, Arizona, U.S.
- Party: Republican
- Education: Bethany College, West Virginia; University of Kentucky (BA)

James J. Davidson (November 5, 1861 – January 2, 1897) was an American politician and businessman.

== Biography ==
Born in Connellsville, Pennsylvania on November 5, 1861, Davidson moved with his family to Beaver County, Pennsylvania. In 1878, he attended school in Beaver, Pennsylvania and then Bethany College, in Bethany, West Virginia prior to graduating from the University of Kentucky in 1883.

He then returned to Beaver, Pennsylvania to study law. In 1885, he worked for Darragh, Watson & Company, which was engaged in oil production.

Davidson subsequently became president of Union Drawn Steel Works. In 1896, he was elected to the United States House of Representatives as a Republican. During this time, he traveled to Colorado and Utah to try to improve his ill health.

== Death ==
In 1897, Davidson died in Phoenix, Arizona Territory as a result of his ill health and before the March 4, 1897 beginning of his term.

== See also ==
- List of United States representatives-elect who never took their seats

== Notes ==
U.S. House of Representatives
Preceded by Thomas Phillips	Member-elect of the U.S. House of Representatives from Pennsylvania's 25th congressional district 1896–1897	Succeeded by Joseph Showalter
