= James T. Maffett =

American politician

James Thompson Maffett
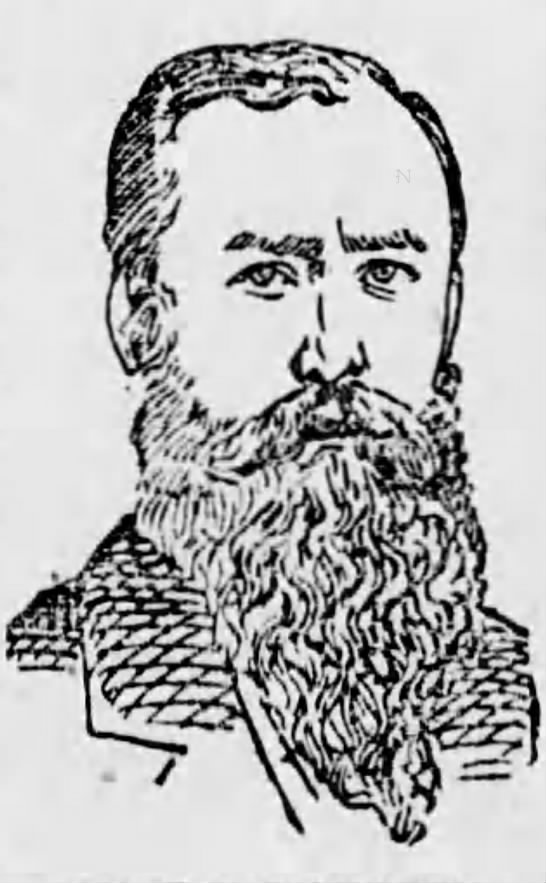
- The Philadelphia Times, November 6, 1886

Member of the U.S. House of Representatives from Pennsylvania's 25th district
- In office March 4, 1887 – March 3, 1889
- Preceded by: Alexander Colwell White
- Succeeded by: Charles Champlain Townsend

Personal details
- Born: February 2, 1837 Clarion Township, Pennsylvania, U.S.
- Died: December 19, 1912 (aged 75) Clarion, Pennsylvania, U.S.
- Party: Republican

James Thompson Maffett (February 2, 1837 – December 19, 1912) was a Republican member of the U.S. House of Representatives from Pennsylvania.

James T.Maffett was born in Clarion Township, Pennsylvania. He attended the common schools, Rimersburg Academy, and Jefferson College in Canonsburg, Pennsylvania (now Washington & Jefferson College). He taught school in Missouri for one year, and then, in 1859, moved to California, where he taught school in Amador County and began the study of law. He returned to Pennsylvania in 1870 and continued the study of law. He was admitted to the bar in Brookville, Pennsylvania, in 1872 and commenced the practice of his profession in Clarion. He was an unsuccessful candidate for the Republican nomination for Congress in 1884.

Maffett was elected as a Republican to the Fiftieth Congress. He was not a candidate for renomination in 1888. He resumed the practice of his profession and died in Clarion in 1912. Interment in Clarion Cemetery.

== Sources ==
- United States Congress. "James T. Maffett (id: M000044)". Biographical Directory of the United States Congress.
- The Political Graveyard

U.S. House of Representatives
Preceded by Alexander C. White	Member of the U.S. House of Representatives from Pennsylvania's 25th congressional district 1887–1889	Succeeded by Charles C. Townsend
