= Frederick E. McCormick-Goodhart =

British-American barrister

Frederick Emanuel McCormick-Goodhart (January 5, 1854 – September 26, 1924) was a British-born barrister who later moved to the United States and is known for building Langley Park in Langley Park, Maryland.

== Early life ==
Frederick was born on January 5, 1854, at Langley Park, his family's Elizabethan style residence in Beckenham, Kent in England. He was a son of Elizabeth (née Settle) Goodhart and Charles Emanuel Goodhart, Esq. who married in 1846. His siblings included Emanuel Charles Goodhart, George Imson Goodhart, and Henry Neve Goodhart.

His paternal grandparents were Emmanuel Goodhart and Christiana Burford Goodhart. His maternal grandparents were Thomas Jacob Settle, a Captain in the Royal Navy, and Maria Caterina (née di Stella) Settle, who was born at Genoa, Italy. Among his extended family was cousin, Captain Henry di Stella Burford-Hancock, the Chief Justice of Gibraltar.

== Career ==
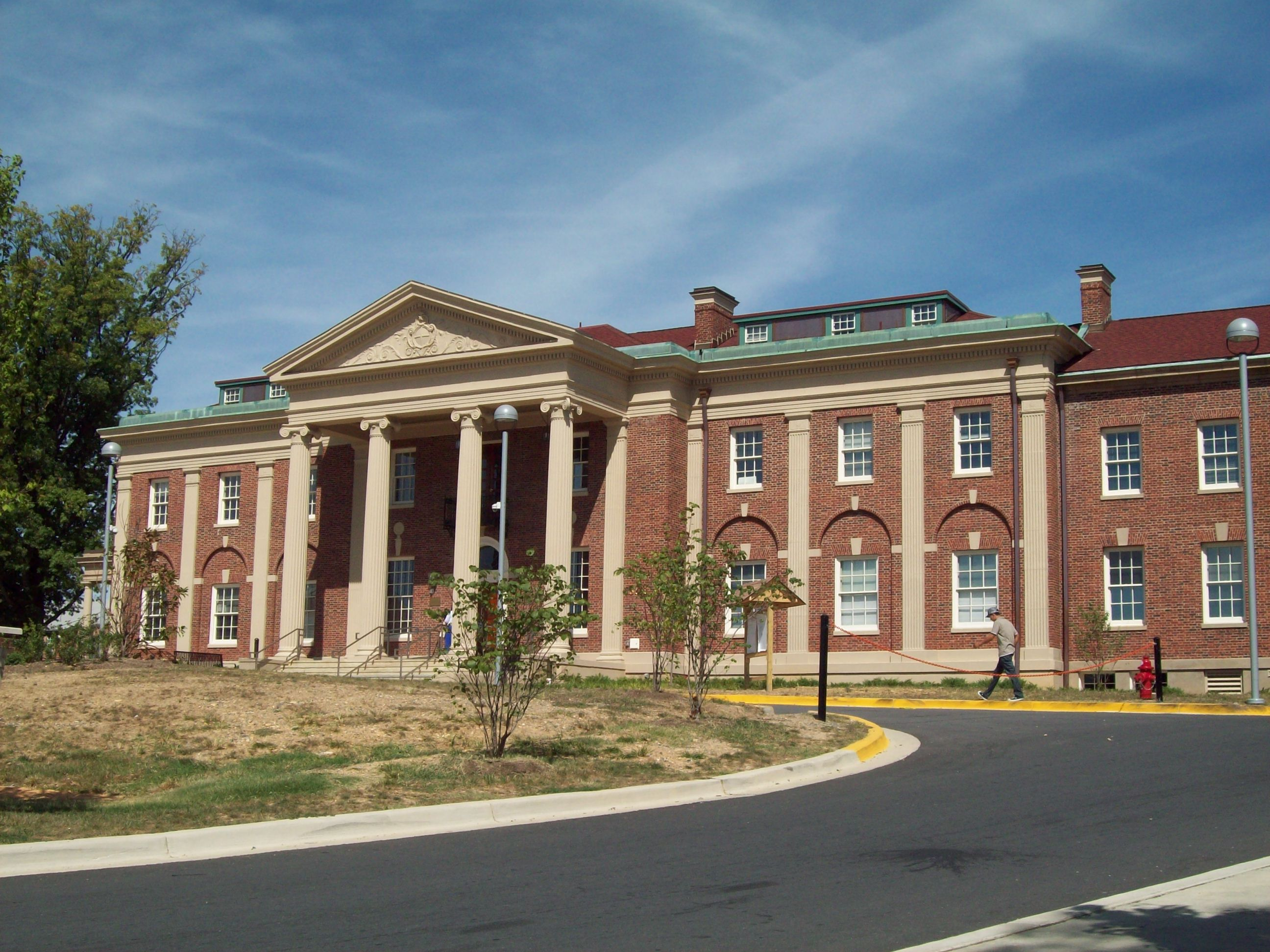
The McCormick-Goodhart residence, Langley Park.

In June 1883, Frederick first came to the United States regarding a Utah mine in which his father had an interest. In 1885, they were living at Hadlow Castle in Tonbridge and Eaton Square in London. After returning to England with his American wife, he practiced law there, then entered politics, running unsuccessfully for a Conservative seat to represent the Isle of Thanet in the House of Commons in 1900 and 1904 (as an Independent Conservative).

He organized the Imperial Service College for the education of sons of officers of the British Army and Navy. For many years, he served as treasurer of the Church Army, a large charitable organizations in the British Isles founded by Wilson Carlile in 1882. In 1899, at the request of his wife's father, he added McCormick to his surname through a "Royal Licence" and the family name officially became McCormick-Goodhart. In 1913, the family home, Langley Park in Kent, was destroyed by fire. In 1920, Frederick and Henrietta decided to move to the United States and make their home there.

=== Langley Park ===
In 1921, the McCormick-Goodharts purchased a 540-acre (2.2 km^{2}) estate northeast of Washington D.C. (and northwest of Bladensburg, Maryland) known as Langley Park and named after Goodhart's ancestral home in England, Langley Fields. They moved into the former owners spacious Burgundy Farm house after they purchased the property in 1921, but in November 1922, this home was also destroyed by fire. In 1924, the McCormick-Goodhart family erected an 18,000-square-foot (1,700 m^{2}), 28-room Georgian revival mansion, designed by architect George Oakley Totten Jr., at a cost of $100,000 that remains a community landmark on 15th Ave.

== Personal life ==
While visiting Chicago on his trip to the United States in 1883, he met Henrietta Laura "Nettie" McCormick. They quickly became engaged and were married on November 14, 1883. Henrietta was a daughter of Leander J. McCormick and Henrietta Maria (née Hamilton) McCormick. Her younger brother was L. Hamilton McCormick, the art collector and inventor, and her paternal grandfather was Robert McCormick Jr. of the prominent McCormick family who founded the McCormick Harvesting Machine Company. After their marriage, they returned to England together and became the parents of two sons who both attended Eton College and Oxford:

- Leander McCormick-Goodhart in 1884, who married Janet Phillips, daughter of U.S. Representative Thomas Wharton Phillips Jr., in 1928. He later married Australian-born Nita Emma Kloeden in August 1952.
- Frederick Hamilton McCormick-Goodhart in 1887, who married the actress Gladys Sylvani in 1912. They divorced and he married Anstiss Hunt de Veau, a daughter of Frederic Clinton de Veau, in 1929.

In 1921, his wife published a memoir titled Hands across the sea.

Goodhart died on September 26, 1924, less than a week after moving into his new home, Langley Park. He was buried at Rock Creek Cemetery in Washington, D.C.
