= Eugene P. Gillespie =

American politician

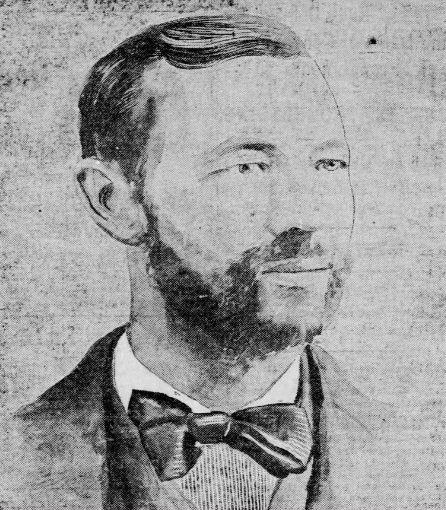
- Philadelphia Inquirer, December 20, 1899

Member of the U.S. House of Representatives from Pennsylvania's 25th district
- In office March 4, 1891 – March 3, 1893
- Preceded by: Charles Champlain Townsend
- Succeeded by: Thomas Wharton Phillips

Personal details
- Born: September 24, 1852 Greenville, Pennsylvania, U.S.
- Died: December 16, 1899 (aged 47) Greenville, Pennsylvania, U.S.
- Party: Democratic
- Education: St. Michael's College

Eugene Pierce Gillespie (September 24, 1852 – December 16, 1899) was a Democratic member of the U.S. House of Representatives from Pennsylvania.

== Biography ==
Gillespie was born in Greenville, Pennsylvania. He attended the public schools, Allegheny College in Meadville, Pennsylvania, and St. Michael's College in Toronto, Ontario, Canada. He studied law, was admitted to the bar in August 1874 and began his legal practice in Greenville.

Gillespie was elected as a Democrat to the Fifty-second Congress. He was an unsuccessful candidate for reelection in 1892.

He continued the practice of law until his death on December 16, 1899. He was buried at the Shenango Valley Cemetery.

U.S. House of Representatives
Preceded by Charles C. Townsend	Member of the U.S. House of Representatives from Pennsylvania's 25th congressional district 1891–1893	Succeeded by Thomas W. Phillips
