= Thomas W. Phillips Jr. =

American politician (1874–1956)

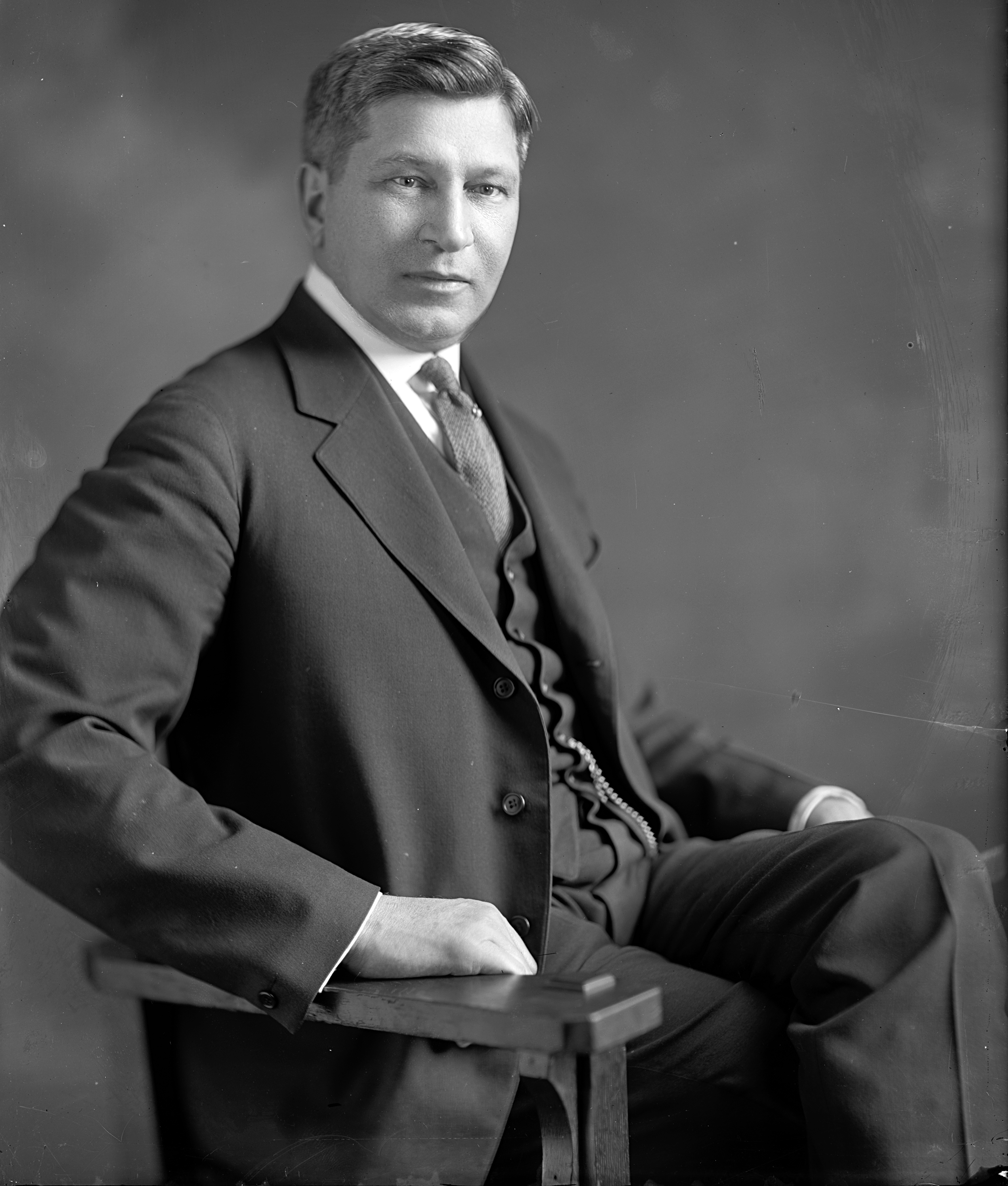
- Phillips, 1905–1945

Member of the U.S. House of Representatives from Pennsylvania's 26th district
- In office March 4, 1923 – March 3, 1927
- Preceded by: William H. Kirkpatrick
- Succeeded by: J. Howard Swick

Personal details
- Born: November 21, 1874 New Castle, Pennsylvania
- Died: January 2, 1956 (aged 81) Penn Township, Pennsylvania
- Spouses: Alma Janet Sherman (died 1945) Greta W. Schoenwald (m. 1946)
- Children: 6
- Parent: Thomas Wharton Phillips (father)
- Education: Yale University

Thomas Wharton Phillips Jr. (November 21, 1874 – January 2, 1956) was a Republican member of the U.S. House of Representatives from Pennsylvania.

== Early life ==
Phillips was born in New Castle, Pennsylvania on November 21, 1874. He was the son of Pamphila (née Hardman) Phillips (1844–1933) and Thomas Wharton Phillips (1835–1912), who also served as a Republican member of the U.S. House of Representatives from Pennsylvania, and later, was appointed a member of the United States Industrial Commission by President William McKinley.

Through his father, he was a descendant of Reverend George Phillips who founded the Congregational Church in New England in the 18th century.

He graduated from Phillips Academy in Andover, Massachusetts, in 1894 and from the Sheffield Scientific School at Yale University in 1897, where he was a member of Chi Phi fraternity.

== Career ==
He was engaged in the petroleum, natural gas, and coal businesses, taking over his father's business in 1912. He was a delegate to the 1916 Republican National Convention.

Phillips was elected as a Republican to the Sixty-eighth and Sixty-ninth Congresses, and did not seek renomination for Congress in 1926. While in Congress, he was a bitter opponent of Prohibition.

He was an unsuccessful candidate for the Republican nomination for Governor in 1926, 1930, and 1934.

=== Post Congress ===
After his service in Congress, he resumed his former occupation and was president of the Phillips Gas and Oil Co., serving for forty-four years. He was also a director of the Butler Consolidated Coal Co., and the Pennsylvania Investment and Real Estate Corp., of Butler, Pennsylvania.

== Personal life ==
Phillips was married to Alma Janet Sherman (1882–1945). Alma was the daughter of Roger Sherman, a noted lawyer in Western Pennsylvania, and Alma Caroline (née Seymour) Sherman. Together, they were the parents of six children, five of whom lived to maturity:

- Janet Sherman Phillips (b. 1909), who married Leander McCormick-Goodhart (1884–1965), son of Frederick E. McCormick-Goodhart and grandson of Leander J. McCormick, in 1928.
- Katherine Phillips (b. 1910), who married Lucien Gerard van Hoorn, the Dutch chargé d'affaires to Austria and Hungary, in 1932. She later married British doctor Frederick L. Rutgers in 1942.
- Alma Phillips (1913–1913), who died in infancy.
- Margaret Sherman Phillips (1914–1990), who married Augustus Craig Succop in 1934.
- Thomas Wharton Phillips III (b. c. 1915).
- Roger Sherman Phillips (1922–1969), who married Virginia Dickson (1922–2011) in 1943. He later married Jeannie Kay DeKlyn (1938–2008), a daughter of Dr. Ward Benedict DeKlyn.

After the death of his first wife in 1945, he remarried the following year to Greta W. Schoenwald. Greta, a mezzo-soprano soloist, was a faculty member at Bethany College in West Virginia from 1955 to 1958.

He died at his mansion, Phillips Hall, on Butler Plank Road in Penn Township, Butler County, Pennsylvania on January 2, 1956. After a funeral at the North Street Church of Christ, where he was a member, he was buried in North Cemetery in Butler, Pennsylvania.

U.S. House of Representatives
Preceded by William H. Kirkpatrick	Member of the U.S. House of Representatives from Pennsylvania's 26th congressional district 1923−1927	Succeeded by J. Howard Swick
