= Pennsylvania's 25th congressional district =

Former U.S. House district in Pennsylvania

Coordinates: 40°40′N 80°15′W

- Obsolete district
- Created: 1830; 1850; 1875
- Eliminated: 1840; 1860; 1980
- Years active: 1833-1843; 1853-1863; 1875-1983

Pennsylvania's 25th congressional district was one of Pennsylvania's districts of the United States House of Representatives.

== Geography ==
In 1903, the district was drawn to cover Crawford and Erie counties, which had been its original area 60 years earlier.

The district was again moved in 1922, when it was redrawn to cover Washington and Greene counties.

In 1942, the boundaries of the district were redrawn without actually moving it for the first time. Greene County was transferred to the 24th District while parts of Allegheny County south and west of down-town Pittsburgh were moved to the 25th District. In 1944, the district boundaries were totally redrawn. It now consisted of Beaver, Butler and Lawrence counties. These boundaries were then redrawn in 1972, with a small strip of northern Allegheny County being put in the 25th district.

The district was eliminated in 1983.

== Demographics ==
In 1902, the district was drawn to cover an area with a population of 162,116. Only 4 of Pennsylvania's 30 districts had fewer people at this point. Some Pennsylvania districts had over 250,000 people at this point. 0.4% of the population of what would be the 25th district in 1902 was black in 1900.

== History ==
This district was created in 1833. In 1853, it consisted of Crawford County, Pennsylvania and Erie County, Pennsylvania at this point. The district had a population of 76,591.

It was eliminated in 1863. This district was recreated in 1873. The district was held at-large until 1875. In 1875, it was made a geographical district covering Forest County, Pennsylvania, Clarion County, Pennsylvania, Jefferson County, Pennsylvania, Armstrong County, Pennsylvania and Indiana County, Pennsylvania. It had a population of 131,663. In 1888, Pennsylvania congressional districts were redrawn because there was a decision to make Pennsylvania's 28th congressional district a geographical district and end its election at large. The 25th district was shifted to cover Butler County, Pennsylvania, Beaver County, Pennsylvania, Lawrence County, Pennsylvania and Mercer County, Pennsylvania. These would remain the boundaries until 1912.

The district was eliminated as a result of the redistricting cycle after the 1980 census.

== List of members representing the district ==
Member	Party	Years	Cong ress	Electoral history
District established March 4, 1833
John Gailbraith (Franklin)	Jacksonian	March 4, 1833 – March 3, 1837	23rd 24th	Elected in 1832. Re-elected in 1834. [data missing]
Arnold Plumer (Franklin)	Democratic	March 4, 1837 – March 3, 1839	25th	Elected in 1836. [data missing]
John Gailbraith (Erie)	Democratic	March 4, 1839 – March 3, 1841	26th	Elected in 1838. [data missing]
Arnold Plumer (Franklin)	Democratic	March 4, 1841 – March 3, 1843	27th	Elected in 1840. [data missing]
District dissolved March 3, 1843
District re-established March 4, 1853
John Dick (Meadville)	Whig	March 4, 1853 – March 3, 1855	33rd 34th 35th	Elected in 1852. Re-elected in 1854. Re-elected in 1856. [data missing]
John Dick (Meadville)	Opposition	March 4, 1855 – March 3, 1857	33rd 34th 35th	Elected in 1852. Re-elected in 1854. Re-elected in 1856. [data missing]
John Dick (Meadville)	Republican	March 4, 1857 – March 3, 1859	33rd 34th 35th	Elected in 1852. Re-elected in 1854. Re-elected in 1856. [data missing]
Elijah Babbitt (Erie)	Republican	March 4, 1859 – March 3, 1863	36th 37th	Elected in 1858. Re-elected in 1860. [data missing]
District dissolved March 3, 1863
District re-established March 4, 1875
George A. Jenks (Brookville)	Democratic	March 4, 1875 – March 3, 1877	44th	Elected in 1874. [data missing]
Harry White (Indiana)	Republican	March 4, 1877 – March 3, 1881	45th 46th	Elected in 1876. Re-elected in 1878. Retired.
James Mosgrove (Kittanning)	Greenback	March 4, 1881 – March 3, 1883	47th	Elected in 1880. Retired.
John D. Patton (Indiana)	Democratic	March 4, 1883 – March 3, 1885	48th	Elected in 1882. Retired.
Alexander C. White (Brookville)	Republican	March 4, 1885 – March 3, 1887	49th	Elected in 1884. Retired.
James T. Maffett (Clarion)	Republican	March 4, 1887 – March 3, 1889	50th	Elected in 1886. Retired.
Charles C. Townsend (New Brighton)	Republican	March 4, 1889 – March 3, 1891	51st	Elected in 1888. Retired.
Eugene P. Gillespie (Greenville)	Democratic	March 4, 1891 – March 3, 1893	52nd	Elected in 1890. Lost re-election.
Thomas W. Phillips (New Castle)	Republican	March 4, 1893 – March 3, 1897	53rd 54th	Elected in 1892. Re-elected in 1894. Retired.
Vacant		March 4, 1897 – April 20, 1897	55th	James J. Davidson was elected in 1896 but died on January 2, 1897.
Joseph B. Showalter (Butler)	Republican	April 20, 1897 – March 3, 1903	55th 56th 57th	Elected to finish Davidson's term. Re-elected in 1898. Re-elected in 1900. Retired.
Arthur L. Bates (Meadville)	Republican	March 4, 1903 – March 3, 1913	58th 59th 60th 61st 62nd	Redistricted from the 26th district and re-elected in 1902. Re-elected in 1904. Re-elected in 1906. Re-elected in 1908. Re-elected in 1910. Retired.
Milton W. Shreve (Erie)	Republican	March 4, 1913 – March 3, 1915	63rd	Elected in 1912. Lost re-election.
Michael Liebel Jr. (Erie)	Democratic	March 4, 1915 – March 3, 1917	64th	Elected in 1914. Retired.
Henry A. Clark (Erie)	Republican	March 4, 1917 – March 3, 1919	65th	Elected in 1916. Retired.
Milton W. Shreve (Erie)	Republican	March 4, 1919 – March 3, 1921	66th	Elected in 1918; Re-elected in 1920. Redistricted to the 29th district.
Milton W. Shreve (Erie)	Independent Republican	March 4, 1921 – March 3, 1923	67th	Elected in 1918; Re-elected in 1920. Redistricted to the 29th district.
Henry W. Temple (Washington)	Republican	March 4, 1923 – March 3, 1933	68th 69th 70th 71st 72nd	Redistricted from the 24th district and re-elected in 1922. Re-elected in 1924. Re-elected in 1926. Re-elected in 1928. Re-elected in 1930. Lost re-election.
Charles I. Faddis (Waynesburg)	Democratic	March 4, 1933 – December 4, 1942	73rd 74th 75th 76th 77th	Elected in 1932. Re-elected in 1934. Re-elected in 1936. Re-elected in 1938. Re-elected in 1940. Lost renomination. Resigned to join the United States Army.
Vacant		December 4, 1942 – January 3, 1943	77th	
Grant Furlong (Donora)	Democratic	January 3, 1943 – January 3, 1945	78th	Elected in 1942. Lost renomination.
Louis E. Graham (Beaver)	Republican	January 3, 1945 – January 3, 1955	79th 80th 81st 82nd 83rd	Redistricted from the 26th district and re-elected in 1944. Re-elected in 1946. Re-elected in 1948. Re-elected in 1950. Re-elected in 1952. Lost re-election.
Frank M. Clark (Bessemer)	Democratic	January 3, 1955 – December 31, 1974	84th 85th 86th 87th 88th 89th 90th 91st 92nd 93rd	Elected in 1954. Re-elected in 1956. Re-elected in 1958. Re-elected in 1960. Re-elected in 1962. Re-elected in 1964. Re-elected in 1966. Re-elected in 1968. Re-elected in 1970. Re-elected in 1972. Lost re-election.
Vacant		December 31, 1974 – January 3, 1975	93rd	
Gary A. Myers (Butler)	Republican	January 3, 1975 – January 3, 1979	94th 95th	Elected in 1974. Re-elected in 1976. Retired.
Eugene Atkinson (Aliquippa)	Democratic	January 3, 1979 – October 14, 1981	96th 97th	Elected in 1978. Re-elected in 1980. Redistricted to the 4th district and lost re-election.
Eugene Atkinson (Aliquippa)	Republican	October 14, 1981 – January 3, 1983	96th 97th	Elected in 1978. Re-elected in 1980. Redistricted to the 4th district and lost re-election.
District dissolved January 3, 1983
