= Charles R. Eckert =

American politician

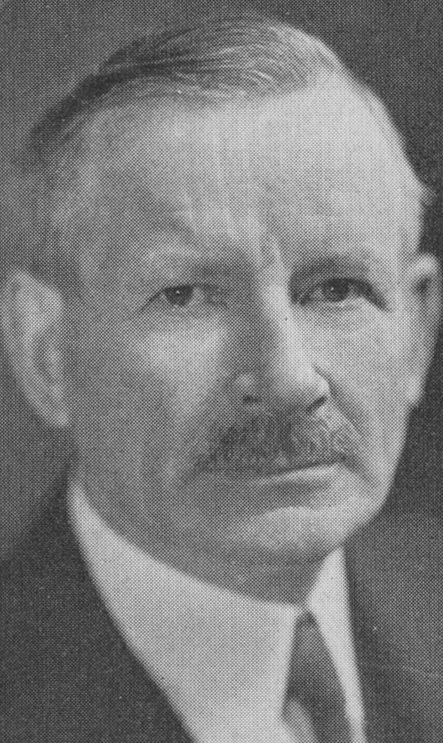

Member of the U.S. House of Representatives from Pennsylvania's 26th district
- In office January 3, 1935 – January 3, 1939
- Preceded by: J. Howard Swick
- Succeeded by: Louis E. Graham

Personal details
- Born: Charles Richard Eckert; January 20, 1868 Pittsburgh, Pennsylvania, U.S.
- Died: October 26, 1959 (aged 91) Rochester, Pennsylvania, U.S.
- Resting place: Beaver Cemetery, Beaver, Pennsylvania
- Party: Democratic

Charles Richard Eckert (January 20, 1868 – October 26, 1959) was an American lawyer and politician who served two terms as a Democratic member of the U.S. House of Representatives from Pennsylvania from 1935 to 1939.

== Biography ==
Charles Richard Eckert was born in Pittsburgh, Pennsylvania. He attended Piersol's Academy at West Bridgewater, Pennsylvania, and Geneva College at Beaver Falls, Pennsylvania. He studied law, and was admitted to the bar in 1894 and commenced practice in Beaver, Pennsylvania.

=== Political career ===
He was a delegate to the 1928 Democratic National Convention.

Eckert was elected as a Democrat to the Seventy-fourth and Seventy-fifth Congresses. He was an unsuccessful candidate for reelection in 1938.

=== Retirement and death ===
After his time in Congress, he served as a member of board of directors of the Beaver Trust Co., and resumed the practice of law until his death, aged 91, as the result of an automobile accident in Rochester, Pennsylvania.

== Sources ==
- United States Congress. "Charles R. Eckert (id: E000032)". Biographical Directory of the United States Congress.
- The Political Graveyard

U.S. House of Representatives
Preceded by J. Howard Swick	Member of the U.S. House of Representatives from Pennsylvania's 26th congressional district 1935–1939	Succeeded by Louis E. Graham
