= Langley Park, Maryland =

- Census-designated place
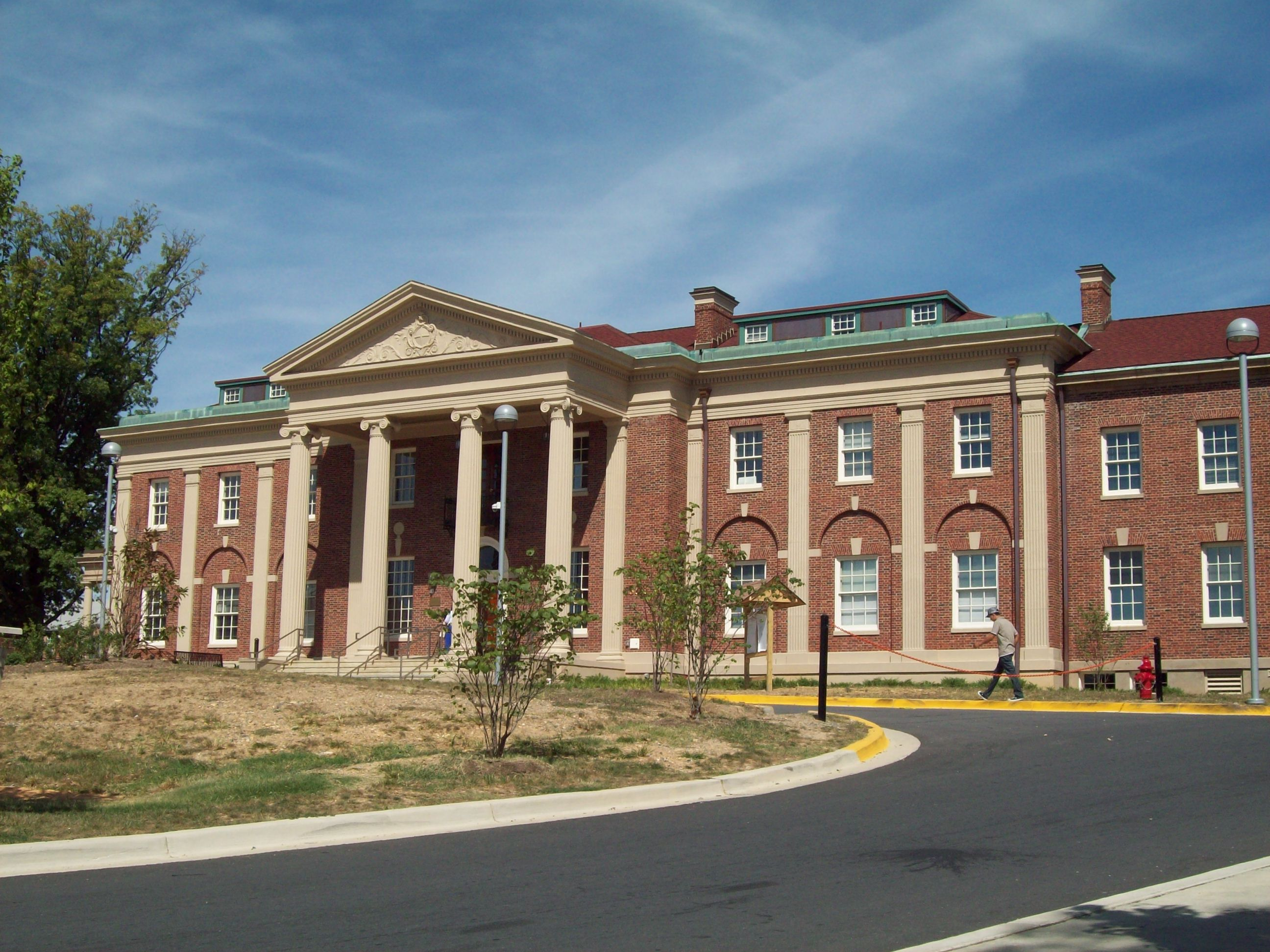
- Langley Park Mansion in September 2010

- Location of Langley Park in Prince George's County, Maryland
- Coordinates: 38°59′39″N 76°58′54″W
- Country: United States
- State: Maryland
- County: Prince George's

Government
  - Director, Action Langley Park: Bill Hanna

Area
  - Total: 1.00 sq mi (2.58 km^{2})
  - Land: 0.99 sq mi (2.57 km^{2})
  - Water: 0 sq mi (0.00 km^{2})
- Elevation: 151 ft (46 m)

Population (2020)
  - Total: 20,126
  - Density: 20,240/sq mi (7,816/km^{2})
- Time zone: UTC−5 (Eastern (EST))
  - Summer (DST): UTC−4 (EDT)
- ZIP Codes: 20783, 20903
- Area codes: 301, 240
- FIPS code: 24-45525
- GNIS feature ID: 0597659

Langley Park is an unincorporated area and census-designated place (CDP) in Prince George's County, Maryland, United States. It is located inside the Capital Beltway, on the northwest edge of Prince George's County, bordering Montgomery County. Per the 2020 census, the population was 20,126.

== History ==
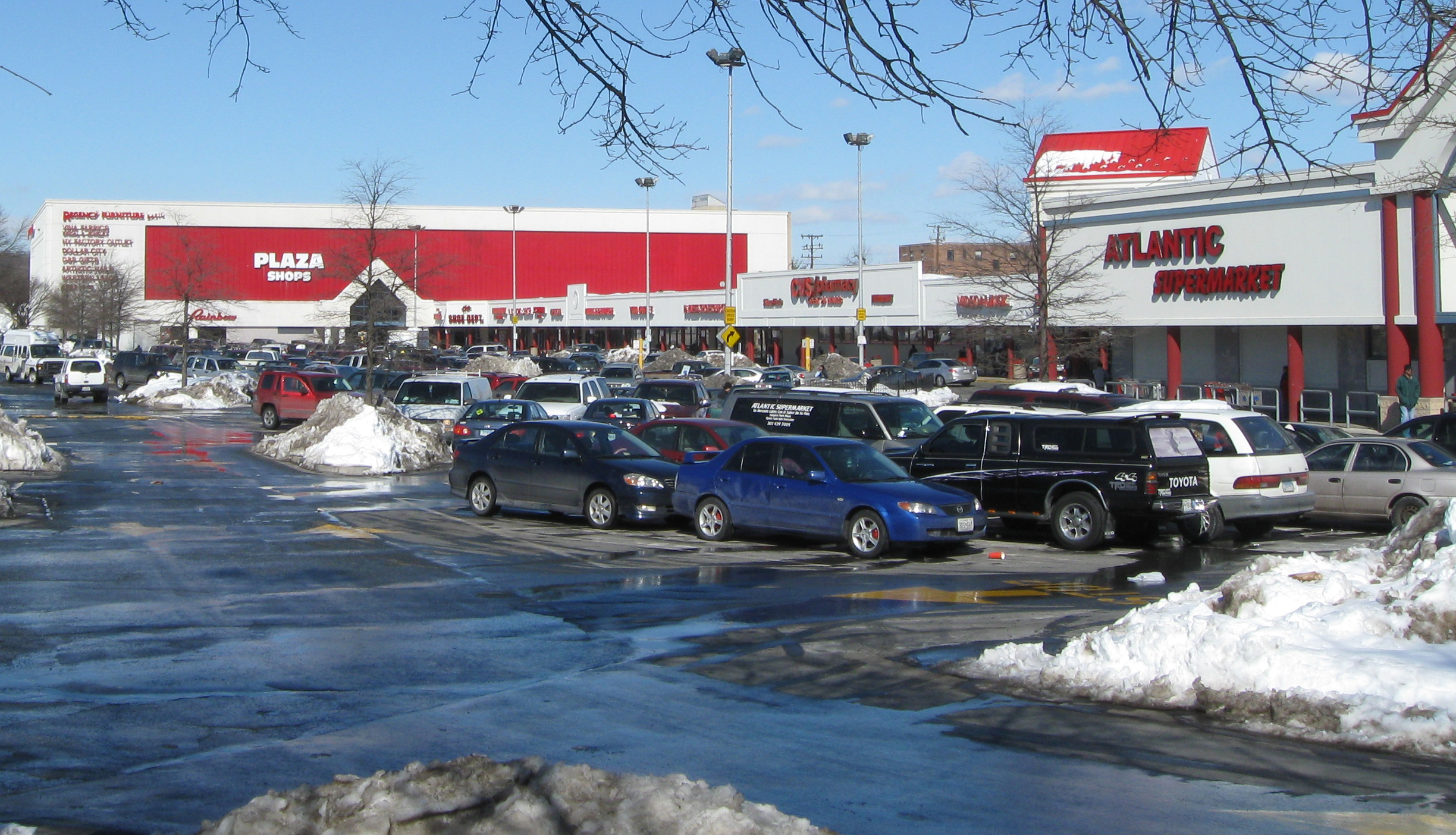
Langley Park Plaza in 2010

"Langley Park" refers to the Langley Park estate established in 1923 by the McCormick-Goodhart family in the Chillum District of Prince George's County. The name McCormick-Goodhart represented the linking of one of Chicago's oldest families, that of Cyrus McCormick, with that of British barrister Frederick E. McCormick-Goodhart. Frederick's wife Henrietta (Nettie) was the daughter of Leander J. McCormick, a brother of Cyrus. They named the 540-acre (2.2 km^{2}) estate "Langley Park" after the Goodharts' ancestral home in Kent, England. In 1924, they erected an 18,000-square-foot (1,700 m^{2}), 28-room Georgian Revival mansion, designed by architect George Oakley Totten Jr., at a cost of $100,000. It remains a community landmark at 8151 15th Ave. CASA of Maryland purchased the property in 2009, making the site its home base, and a US$31 million Multicultural Community Center is now open in the mansion. This property was listed on the National Register of Historic Places on August 29, 2008.

During the late 1930s-early 1940s, Leander McCormick-Goodhart, son of Frederick and Nettie, served as personal assistant to Ambassador Lord Lothian and supervisor of American Relief to Great Britain through the British embassy. As a result, the Langley Park estate became a regular site of social activities related to the British embassy including hosting the regular games of the Washington Cricket Club and, in June 1941, a British Relief Country Fair.

The estate was first subdivided during and immediately after World War II, and was developed as a planned community by Pierre Ghent & Associates of Washington, D.C. The last major section would be developed in 1963. Because of the wartime and immediate postwar demand for housing, the 540-acre (2.2 km^{2}) estate was quickly developed for low-rise apartment homes, semi-detached, and single family homes. Starting in 1949, a 1,542 garden apartment complex, Langley Park Apartments, now located along 14th Avenue, was built to house the exploding postwar population. That same year, M.T. Broyhill and Sons started building on a 200-acre (0.81 km^{2}) tract for 600 single family homes to be priced at around $10,000. These homes now lie north of Merrimac Drive. Both the apartments and homes were completed and occupied by June 1951. In 1951, plans were unveiled for 500 additional multi-family rental dwellings and a 15-acre (61,000 m^{2}), $4 million shopping center.

In 1963, the last major segment of the Langley Park estate opened for development. It was a 25-acre (100,000 m^{2}) parcel located directly around the manor house. It had been acquired in 1947 from the McCormick-Goodhart family by the Eudist Order for use as a seminary. The property was acquired for $900,000 by developers, who built the 400-unit Willowbrook Apartments on the site and opened them the following year. The mansion then operated until the early 1990s as Willowbrook Montessori School.

The Langley Park Elementary School, now known as Langley Park-McCormick School, opened in 1950, at 15th Avenue and Merrimac Drive. In 1988, Leander McCormick-Goodhart, real estate developer and descendant of the estate owners, sent the school a $10,000 donation after receiving an invitation to attend a school event. That same year, 60 percent of the school population of 610 students was foreign born from 45 different countries and spoke 27 languages.

In 1955, Langley Park was "the fastest growing trade area in Metropolitan Washington", with 200,000 people located within a 3-mile (4.8 km) radius. Affordable housing attracted a community consisting mostly of young couples with families. In the following decades, Langley Park became a white middle-class enclave that was mostly Jewish. By the 1960s, the Jewish community of Langley Park had already begun to decline. During the 1970s, after desegregation, increasing numbers of African Americans moved into the community. Although some established families remained, the white population declined due to white flight to the outer suburbs. In 1970, the first language of 6.1 percent was Spanish; by 1980 that number had climbed to 13.4 percent. During the 1980s, Hispanic and Caribbean immigrants from countries such as El Salvador, Mexico, Guatemala, Colombia, Bolivia, Peru, Jamaica and elsewhere in the West Indies led a new wave of migration into the community. In addition, Asian and African immigrants from places like Vietnam, India, Ethiopia and Nigeria settled into the area. It proved to be an attractive locale for immigrants due to the availability of affordable housing that could also accommodate families. The integration of these new groups into Langley Park reflected a larger trend of increased migration to the Greater Washington area during the 1980s and 1990s. By 1990, the area was 40 percent Hispanic.

At the same time, the area suffered through a period of physical decline and increases in crime. During the 1980s, the community struggled with blighted residential and commercial areas. The apartment complexes experienced substantial turnover in occupancy. Residents in the 14th Avenue and Kanawha Street area in particular were subjected to "open air drug markets" and other criminal activity. Long-time residents and the new immigrant communities were both victims of crime. Some homeowners organized to address neighborhood concerns about rising crime. For the 1988–89 school year, bus service for children who lived in walking distance to school was implemented to ensure their safety. Police also increased their presence in the community. Apartment complexes, under new management, initiated safety measures to discourage drug activity such as installing new lighting, security doors and maintaining general upkeep of their properties. At the same time, police in Prince George's County conducted multiple raids in an effort to shut down drug activity in the county. By 1991, officials were taking note of an increase in illegal immigrants from Central America, and day laborers were beginning to become a common sight on area streets.

== Geography ==
Langley Park is located at 38°59′39″N 76°58′54″W (38.994060, −76.981759), with a total area of 1.0 square mile (2.6 km^{2}), all land. The community is bordered by University Boulevard to the south, the Northwest Branch Anacostia River to the north, Phelps Road to the east, and the Prince George's County–Montgomery County line to the west. An extremely small stretch of Piney Branch Road (MD 320) which goes into Prince George's County, goes into the Langley Park neighborhood as well, just before it crosses the Northwest Branch Anacostia River and intersects New Hampshire Avenue (MD 650). While most of the Langley Park neighborhood contains the Hyattsville ZIP Code of 20783, there is a small portion of Langley Park located west of New Hampshire Avenue (MD 650), but east of the Prince George's County–Montgomery County line, which contains the Silver Spring ZIP Code of 20903. Langley Park is surrounded by the communities of Adelphi, Silver Spring, Takoma Park, Carole Highlands, and Lewisdale.

== Demographics ==
Historical population
Census	Pop.	Note	%±
2000	16,214		—
2010	18,755		15.7%
2020	20,126		7.3%
U.S. Decennial Census; 2010 2020

=== Racial and ethnic composition ===
Langley Park CDP, Maryland – Racial and ethnic composition Note: the US Census treats Hispanic/Latino as an ethnic category. This table excludes Latinos from the racial categories and assigns them to a separate category. Hispanics/Latinos may be of any race.
Race / Ethnicity (NH = Non-Hispanic)	Pop 2000	Pop 2010	Pop 2020	% 2000	% 2010	% 2020
White alone (NH)	881	779	513	5.43%	4.15%	2.55%
Black or African American alone (NH)	4,074	2,850	2,119	25.13%	15.20%	10.53%
Native American or Alaska Native alone (NH)	31	39	36	0.19%	0.21%	0.18%
Asian alone (NH)	548	523	354	3.38%	2.79%	1.76%
Native Hawaiian or Pacific Islander alone (NH)	16	9	10	0.10%	0.05%	0.05%
Other race alone (NH)	40	51	107	0.25%	0.27%	0.53%
Mixed race or Multiracial (NH)	330	145	199	2.04%	0.77%	0.99%
Hispanic or Latino (any race)	10,294	14,359	16,788	63.49%	76.56%	83.41%
Total	16,214	18,755	20,126	100.00%	100.00%	100.00%

=== 2020 census ===
As of the 2020 census, Langley Park had a population of 20,126. The median age was 30.1 years. 29.3% of residents were under the age of 18 and 5.3% of residents were 65 years of age or older. For every 100 females there were 125.0 males, and for every 100 females age 18 and over there were 131.8 males age 18 and over.

100.0% of residents lived in urban areas, while 0.0% lived in rural areas.

There were 5,288 households in Langley Park, of which 52.5% had children under the age of 18 living in them. Of all households, 39.6% were married-couple households, 25.7% were households with a male householder and no spouse or partner present, and 22.6% were households with a female householder and no spouse or partner present. About 16.1% of all households were made up of individuals and 4.2% had someone living alone who was 65 years of age or older.

There were 5,457 housing units, of which 3.1% were vacant. The homeowner vacancy rate was 0.3% and the rental vacancy rate was 3.1%.

Racial composition as of the 2020 census
Race	Number	Percent
White	1,664	8.3%
Black or African American	2,195	10.9%
American Indian and Alaska Native	1,017	5.1%
Asian	387	1.9%
Native Hawaiian and Other Pacific Islander	21	0.1%
Some other race	11,607	57.7%
Two or more races	3,235	16.1%

=== 2010 census ===
As of the census of 2010, there were 18,755 people, 5,082 households, and 3,375 families residing in the area. The population density was 18,682.8 persons per square mile.

- 26.0% White
- 16.4% African American
- 2.6% Native American
- 2.9% Asian
- 0.5% Pacific Islander
- 43.6 from some other races
- 7.9% from two or more races

76.6% of the population is Hispanic or Latino of any race (note that this includes a combination of Hispanics from all different parts of Latin America).

There were 5,082 households, out of which 32.5% had children under the age of 18 living with them, 33.1% were married couples living together, 14.9% had a female householder with no husband present, and 33.6% were non-families. 18.0% of all households were made up of individuals, and 2.7% had someone living alone who was 65 years of age or older. The average household size was 3.67, and the average family size was 3.69.

In the community the population was spread out, with 21.7% under the age of 18, 15.4% from 18 to 24, 43.6% from 25 to 44, 15.4% from 45 to 64, and 3.9% who were 65 years of age or older. The median age was 29.4 years. For every 100 females, there were 152.1 males. For every 100 females age 18 and over, there were 166.8 males.

=== 2000 census ===
At the 2000 census, the median income for a household in the community was $37,939, and the median income for a family was $36,018. Males had a median income of $22,356 versus $21,931 for females. The per capita income for the community was $12,733. About 11.3% of families and 16.8% of the population were below the poverty line, including 21.4% of those under age 18 and 6.7% of those age 65 or over. A 2011 news article noted that "About one in five residents ... lives below the poverty level...."

In 2000, 21.48% of Langley Park residents identified as being of Salvadoran heritage. This was the largest percentage of Salvadoran Americans of any place in the United States. Over the last couple of years, there have also been growing communities of Guatemalans, Puerto Ricans, Nicaraguans and Mexicans.

== Government and infrastructure ==
The Chillum-Adelphi Volunteer Fire Department (CAVFD) serves Langley Park. The station is in Langley Park CDP and has an Adelphi postal address. In March 1951 and June 8, 1951, the CAVFD was established and chartered, respectively. From November and March 1953 the fire station on Riggs Road was constructed; the County Volunteer Firemen's Association designated it Station No. 34. Portions of Station No. 34 were rebuilt in the early 1960s, and it was rededicated on November 16, 1963. In 1962 the CAVFD began building a substation, No. 44, which was dedicated on November 16, 1963, but in 1992 it sold the substation to the county government.

Prince George’s County Police Department's District 1 serves Langley Park; its station is in Hyattsville.

The United States Postal Service Langley Park Post Office is physically in the City of Takoma Park and has a Hyattsville postal address.

=== Transportation ===
Two light rail stations on the Purple Line are being constructed to serve Langley Park. One station will be at New Hampshire Avenue and University Boulevard, which was named one of the most dangerous intersections in Maryland for pedestrians to cross. The danger is due to crossings of these six-lane routes mid-block at curbside bus stops. The other station will be located at University Boulevard and Riggs Road. The Purple Line, which will connect to the Washington Metro, Amtrak and MARC, is under construction as of 2022 and is scheduled to open in 2026.

== Economy ==
Langley Park is probably best known as a center of commercial activity in northwestern Prince George's County. At each of the two corners of the New Hampshire Avenue / University Boulevard intersection is a large strip shopping center. One is known as the Langley Park Plaza (northeast corner), while the other is known as the Langley Park Shopping Center (northwest corner). There are also three other small shopping centers a few blocks east of New Hampshire Avenue, two are located on the northeast and northwest sides of the intersection of University Boulevard and Riggs Road, while the third one is located at the intersection of University Boulevard and 15th Avenue.

== Education ==
The Prince George's County Public Schools (PGCPS) operates public schools. Langley Park-McCormick Elementary School is located in Langley Park. It had 679 students circa March 2013, with all but 12 living in Langley Park. In 2007 the school had 435 students. That year about 90% of the students at earlier grades were identified as learning English as a second language, and 370 students in all grade levels were Hispanic or Latino. Langley Park-McCormick entered into the Title I program due to the low income statuses of many of its students. Amy Stout became the principal in 2008 as former principal Sandra Jimenez, who started at Langley Park circa 2002, became the principal of Buck Lodge Middle School.

In 1987 the 611 students originated from 33 countries, with about 50% being born outside the United States; Central American and South American-born students made up the majority of that group. That year the students altogether spoke 17 languages. As of 2004 95% of the students were Hispanic/Latino. In 2001, there were 750 students, with about 33% of them being in the "English for Speakers of Other Languages" (ESOL) program, and over 90% qualifying for free or reduced lunches. In 2001 it had five bilingual employees.

Other schools educating significant numbers of Langley Park students include Mary Harris “Mother” Jones Elementary School in Adelphi, Cool Spring Elementary School in Adelphi, Buck Lodge Middle School in Adelphi, Sonia Sotomayor Middle School in Adelphi, and High Point High School in Beltsville. In 2013 the percentages of four those schools' students living in Langley Park were 82% (for Jones), 72% (for Cool Spring), 32% (for Buck Lodge), and 23% (for High Point). In the 2012–2013 school year 2,669 Langley Park students attended Langley Park-McCormick, Jones, Cool Spring, Buck Lodge, and High Point; making up 92% of the public school students in the community; while 220 Langley Park students attended 52 other PGCPS Schools. As of 2001 Langley Park-McCormick, Adelphi, and Cool Spring elementaries had percentages of Hispanic students and students with free/reduced lunches higher than the average for PGCPS; Adelphi and Cool Springs each had over 56% of their students being Hispanic/Latino and about 50% being on free/reduced lunches. Sotomayor Middle opened in 2023.

Sections of the CDP north of Route 193 are assigned to Langley Park-McCormick, Jones, and Cool Spring; a section of the CDP south of Route 193 is zoned to Carole Highlands Elementary School. Carole Highlands has a Takoma Park postal address but is within the Langley Park CDP boundaries. As of the 1990 US Census and the 2000 US Census, Carole Highlands Elementary, as well as all of the areas south of Route 193, was in the Chillum CDP. Most of Langley Park CDP is within the zone for Sotomayor Middle while parts are in the zone for Buck Lodge Middle. All of the CDP is zoned to High Point High School.

In the 2011–12 school year 36% of 9th grade students from Langley Park, who attended High Point, did not go to school for at least 20 days per school year compared to 29% district average for 9th graders and 10% district average for 7th and 8th graders; the Langley Park 7th and 8th graders truancy rate was the same as the district average. Scott, et al. stated in a 2014 paper published by think tank The Urban Institute that a possible reason was that start time of High Point was the same as that of Buck Lodge Middle School even though the high school's distance from Langley Park was 4 miles (6.4 km) longer than that of the middle school.

== Recreation ==
Every year, Langley Park Day is held at Langley Park-McCormick Elementary. It has festivities as well as health screenings. It started in 1999. The school, Action Langley Park, the Prince George's County Department of Parks and Recreation, and the Maryland-National Capital Park and Planning Commission sponsors Langley Park Day.

== In literature ==
Langley Park of the early 1960s is featured in the short story "Blue Divisions" by Cuban-American author Alfredo Franco.
