= Joseph B. Showalter =

American politician

Joseph Baltzell Showalter
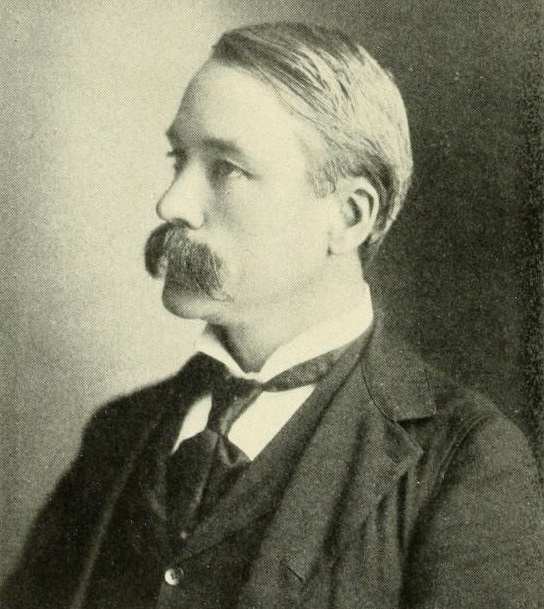
- From Volume II of Autobiographies and Portraits of the President, Cabinet, Supreme Court, and Fifty-fifth Congress

Member of the U.S. House of Representatives from Pennsylvania's 25th district
- In office April 20, 1897 – March 3, 1903
- Preceded by: Thomas Wharton Phillips
- Succeeded by: Arthur Laban Bates

Personal details
- Born: February 11, 1851 Smithfield, Pennsylvania, U.S.
- Died: December 3, 1932 (aged 81) Washington, D.C., U.S.
- Party: Republican

Joseph Baltzell Showalter (February 11, 1851 – December 3, 1932) was a Republican member of the United States House of Representatives from Pennsylvania.

== Personal ==
Joseph B. Showalter was born near Smithfield, Pennsylvania. He attended Georges Creek Academy at Smithfield, and taught school in West Virginia, Indiana, and Illinois from 1867 to 1873. He moved to Chicora, Pennsylvania, in 1873 and engaged in the production of petroleum and natural gas. He studied medicine at Long Island College Hospital in Brooklyn, New York, in 1883, and graduated in 1884 from the College of Physicians and Surgeons of Baltimore, Maryland (which later merged into the University of Maryland School of Medicine which is a component of the University of Maryland, Baltimore.

He died in 1932 in Washington, D.C., and was interred in the North Cemetery in Butler, Pennsylvania.

== Career ==
=== Medicine ===
Showalter practiced medicine in Chicora from 1884 to 1890, when he again engaged in the production of petroleum and natural gas.

=== Politics ===
Showalter was elected as member of the Pennsylvania State House of Representatives in 1887 and 1888. He served in the Pennsylvania State Senate from 1889 to 1892.

He was elected as a Republican to the Fifty-fifth Congress to fill the vacancy caused by the death of James J. Davidson. He was reelected to the Fifty-sixth and Fifty-seventh Congresses. He was not a candidate for reelection in 1902.

=== Later career ===
He resumed his former business pursuits and resided in Butler, Pennsylvania. He later moved to Pittsburgh, Pennsylvania, and then to Washington, D.C. He was engaged in the development of land in southern Florida.

U.S. House of Representatives
Preceded by Thomas W. Phillips	Member of the U.S. House of Representatives from Pennsylvania's 25th congressional district 1897–1903	Succeeded by Arthur L. Bates
