= J. Howard Swick =

American politician (1879–1952)

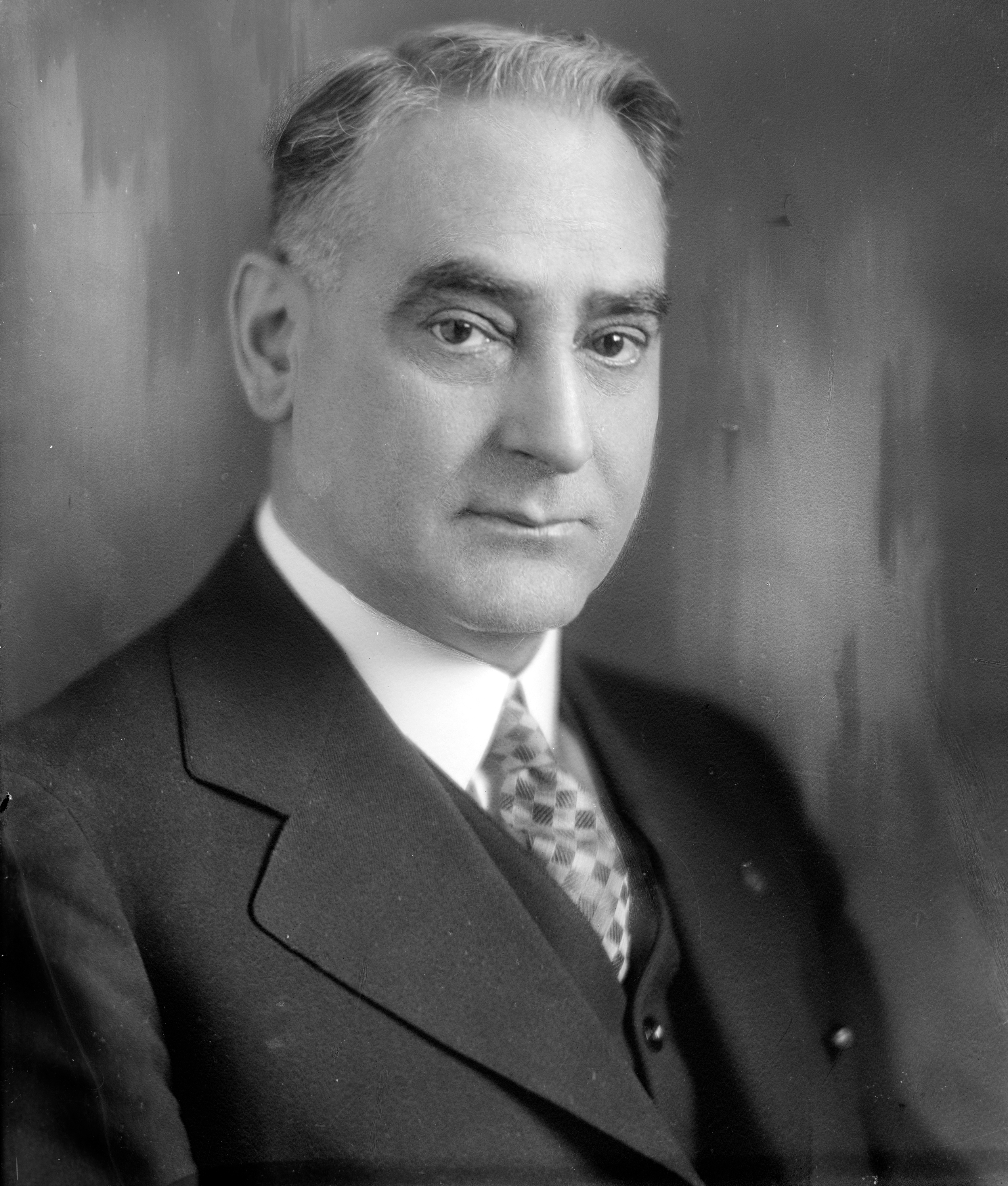
Swick, 1905–1945

Jesse Howard Swick (August 6, 1879 – November 17, 1952) was a Republican member of the U.S. House of Representatives from Pennsylvania.

J. Howard Swick was born near New Brighton, Pennsylvania. He attended Geneva College in nearby Beaver Falls, where he taught from 1895 to 1900. He graduated from Hahnemann Medical College of Philadelphia in 1900. He moved to Beaver Falls in 1906 and commenced the practice of medicine.

He served as president of the Beaver Falls Bureau of Health from 1907 to 1914. During the First World War, Swick served as a first lieutenant and later as a captain in the Medical Corps of the United States Army, with overseas service, from August 31, 1917, to May 9, 1919.

After his time in the service, he resumed the practice of medicine in Beaver Falls. He was also interested in banking and the manufacturing of steel products. He served as a member of the Beaver Falls City Council from 1925 to 1927.

Swick was elected as a Republican to the Seventieth and to the three succeeding Congresses. He was an unsuccessful candidate for reelection in 1934. He resumed the practice of medicine until August 1945, when he retired.

He died in Beaver Falls, aged 73, and is buried in Concord Cemetery in North Sewickley Township, Beaver County, Pennsylvania.

U.S. House of Representatives
Preceded by Thomas W. Phillips, Jr.	Member of the U.S. House of Representatives from Pennsylvania's 26th congressional district 1927–1935	Succeeded by Charles R. Eckert
