= Grant Furlong =

American politician

Robert G. Furlong
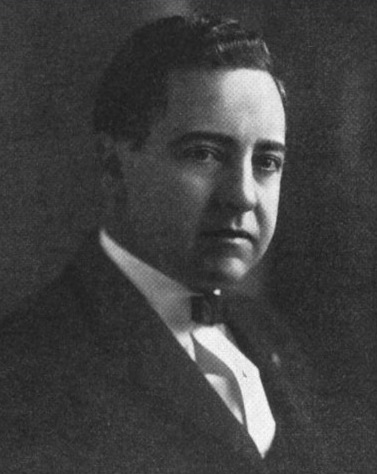
- From Volume III (1926) History of Washington County, Pennsylvania

Member of the U.S. House of Representatives from Pennsylvania's 25th district
- In office January 3, 1943 – January 3, 1945
- Preceded by: Charles I. Faddis
- Succeeded by: Louis E. Graham

Personal details
- Born: January 4, 1886 Roscoe, Pennsylvania, U.S.
- Died: March 19, 1973 (aged 87) Donora, Pennsylvania, U.S.
- Party: Democratic
- Education: State Teachers College; Jefferson Medical College

Robert Grant Furlong (January 4, 1886 – March 19, 1973) was an American physician and politician who served one term as a Democratic member of the U.S. House of Representatives from Pennsylvania from 1943 to 1945.

== Biography ==
Furlong was born in Roscoe, Pennsylvania. He graduated from the State Teachers College in California, Pennsylvania, in 1904 and from Jefferson Medical College in Philadelphia, Pennsylvania, in 1909.

=== Early career ===
He taught school at Roscoe, PA, in 1904 and 1905, and practiced medicine in Donora, Pennsylvania, from 1910 to 1968. During the First World War, Furlong served as a first lieutenant with the Two Hundred and Eightieth Ambulance Company, Twentieth Division. He served as a burgess of Donora from 1922 to 1926 and again in 1941 and 1942. He served as postmaster of Donora from 1933 to 1938.

=== Congress ===
Furlong was elected as a Democrat to the Seventy-eighth Congress, but was an unsuccessful candidate for renomination in 1944.

=== Career after Congress ===
He resumed the practice of medicine, and was elected sheriff of Washington County, Pennsylvania, serving from 1945 to 1961.

=== Death ===
He died on March 19, 1973, in Donora, Pennsylvania.

U.S. House of Representatives
Preceded by Charles I. Faddis	Member of the U.S. House of Representatives from Pennsylvania's 25th congressional district 1943–1945	Succeeded by Louis E. Graham
