= John Galbraith (Pennsylvania politician) =

American politician (1794–1860)

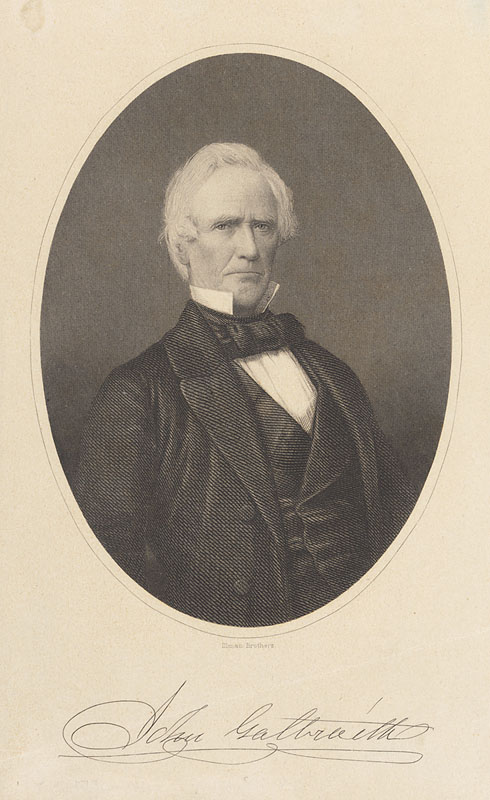

Member of the U.S. House of Representatives from Pennsylvania's 25th district
- In office March 4, 1839 – March 3, 1841
- Preceded by: Arnold Plumer
- Succeeded by: Arnold Plumer
- In office March 4, 1833 – March 3, 1837
- Preceded by: District created
- Succeeded by: Arnold Plumer

Member of the Pennsylvania House of Representatives from Venango and Warren Counties
- In office 1829-1832
- Succeeded by: James Thompson

Personal details
- Born: August 2, 1794 Huntingdon, Pennsylvania, U.S.
- Died: June 15, 1860 (aged 65) Erie, Pennsylvania, U.S.
- Resting place: Erie Cemetery
- Party: Jacksonian; Democratic

John Galbraith (August 2, 1794 – June 15, 1860) was a three term Jacksonian and Democratic member of the U.S. House of Representatives from Pennsylvania, serving from 1833 to 1837, and again from 1839 to 1841.

== Early life and career ==
John Galbraith was born in Huntingdon, Pennsylvania. He moved with his parents in 1796 to Allegheny Township, in Huntingdon County, and subsequently, in 1802, to Centre Township, in Butler County. He attended the common schools and served an apprenticeship at the printer's trade.

He taught school, studied law, was admitted to the bar in 1817 and commenced practice in Butler, Pennsylvania. He moved to Franklin, Pennsylvania, in 1822 and continued the practice of his profession.

== Political career ==
He was a member of the Pennsylvania House of Representatives from 1829 to 1832.

Galbraith was elected as a Jacksonian to the Twenty-third and Twenty-fourth Congresses. He was an unsuccessful candidate for renomination in 1836.

He moved to Erie, Pennsylvania, in 1837, and resumed the practice of law. He was again elected as a Democrat to the Twenty-sixth Congress. He was not a candidate for renomination in 1840.

== Later career and death ==
He again engaged in the practice of law, and was elected president judge of the sixth judicial district in 1851 and served until his death in Erie in 1860.

He is buried in Erie Cemetery.

U.S. House of Representatives
Preceded by District created	Member of the U.S. House of Representatives from Pennsylvania's 25th congressional district 1833 - 1837	Succeeded by Arnold Plumer
Preceded by Arnold Plumer	Member of the U.S. House of Representatives from Pennsylvania's 25th congressional district 1839 - 1841	Succeeded by Arnold Plumer
