= Louis E. Graham =

American politician

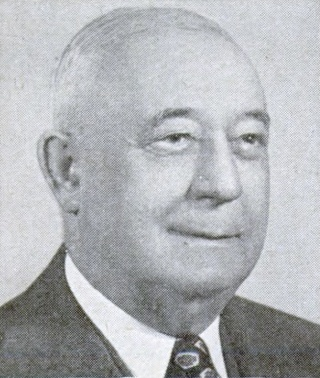

Member of the U.S. House of Representatives from Pennsylvania
- In office January 3, 1939 – January 3, 1955
- Preceded by: Charles R. Eckert
- Succeeded by: Frank M. Clark
- Constituency: 26th district (1939–1945); 25th district (1945–1955)

United States Attorney for the Western District of Pennsylvania
- In office November 7, 1929 – September 1, 1933
- Preceded by: John D. Meyer
- Succeeded by: Horatio S. Dumbauld

Personal details
- Born: August 4, 1880 New Castle, Pennsylvania, U.S.
- Died: November 9, 1965 (aged 85) Rochester, Pennsylvania, U.S.
- Party: Republican

Louis Edward Graham (August 4, 1880 – November 9, 1965) was an American politician who was a Republican member of the U.S. House of Representatives from Pennsylvania.

== Biography ==
Louis E. Graham was born in New Castle, Pennsylvania, and moved with his parents to Beaver, Pennsylvania in 1893. He graduated from Washington and Jefferson College in Washington, Pennsylvania, in 1901. He served as deputy sheriff of Beaver County, Pennsylvania, from 1903 to 1906. He was district attorney of Beaver County from 1912 to 1924 and deputy attorney general of Pennsylvania from 1924 to 1927.

He served as chief legal adviser of the former sixth Federal prohibition district from 1927 to 1929, and served as U.S. Attorney for the Western District of Pennsylvania from November 7, 1929, to September 1, 1933. He was special assistant to the United States Attorney General in the Pittsburgh vote-fraud cases (1934–1936).

Graham was elected as a Republican to the Seventy-sixth Congress in 1938 and to the seven succeeding Congresses. He was Chairman of the United States Joint Committee on Immigration and Nationality Policy during the Eighty-third Congress. He was an unsuccessful candidate for reelection in 1954, defeated by Democrat Frank M. Clark.

== Sources ==
- United States Congress. "Louis E. Graham (id: G000360)". Biographical Directory of the United States Congress.
- The Political Graveyard

U.S. House of Representatives
Preceded by Charles R. Eckert	Member of the U.S. House of Representatives from Pennsylvania's 26th congressional district 1939–1945	Succeeded by Harve Tibbott
Preceded by Grant Furlong	Member of the U.S. House of Representatives from Pennsylvania's 25th congressional district 1945–1955	Succeeded by Frank M. Clark
