= Gary A. Myers =

American politician

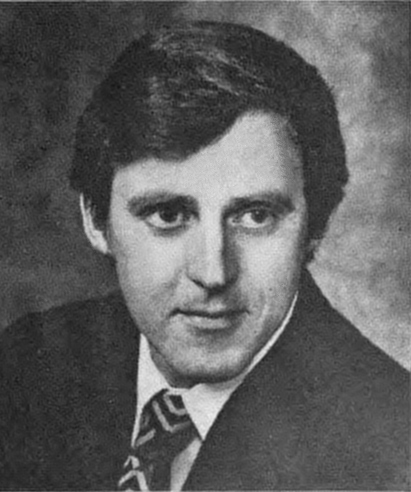

Member of the U.S. House of Representatives from Pennsylvania's 25th district
- In office January 3, 1975 – January 3, 1979
- Preceded by: Frank M. Clark
- Succeeded by: Eugene Atkinson

Personal details
- Born: August 16, 1937 Toronto, Ohio, U.S.
- Died: October 31, 2020 (aged 83) Sebastian, Florida, U.S.
- Party: Republican
- Children: 2
- Education: University of Cincinnati (BS); University of Pittsburgh (MBA)

Military service
- Branch/service: United States Air Force
- Years of service: 1961–1968
- Unit: Air Force Reserve Command

Gary Arthur Myers (August 16, 1937 – October 31, 2020) was an American politician who served as a member of the U.S. House of Representatives for Pennsylvania's 25th congressional district from 1975 to 1979.

== Early life and education ==
Gary Myers was born in Toronto, Ohio, and grew up in Evans City, Pennsylvania. He earned a Bachelor of Science degree from the University of Cincinnati in 1960 and a Master of Business Administration from the University of Pittsburgh in 1964.

== Career ==
Myers pursued a professional career in mechanical and industrial engineering as a steel mill turn foreman. He served in the Air Force Reserve Command from 1961 to 1968. He was an unsuccessful candidate for Congress in 1972.

=== Congress ===
He was elected as a Republican to the 94th Congress in 1974, defeating incumbent Democratic Congressman Frank M. Clark. He chose not to be a candidate for reelection in 1978 and returned to work as a steel mill foreman.

As a member of the United States House Committee on Oversight and Reform, he worked to amend Title 39 of the United States Code to prohibit franked mailing by members of Congress and certain officers of the United States. As a member of the United States House Committee on Ways and Means, he advocated for the Automobile Efficiency Tax Incentive Act. Myers also sponsored a bill that would prohibit the U.S. Consumer Product Safety Commission from restricting the sale or manufacture of firearms or ammunition.

=== Retirement ===
Myers did not seek re-election in 1978, citing his desire to spend more time with his wife and two children. The Myers family moved back to their home in Butler, Pennsylvania. A few months later, he rejoined the Armco Steel Company.

== Personal life ==
Myers died in Sebastian, Florida, on October 31, 2020.

U.S. House of Representatives
Preceded by Frank M. Clark	Member of the U.S. House of Representatives from Pennsylvania's 25th congressional district 1975-1979	Succeeded by Eugene Atkinson
