= Elijah Babbitt =

American politician

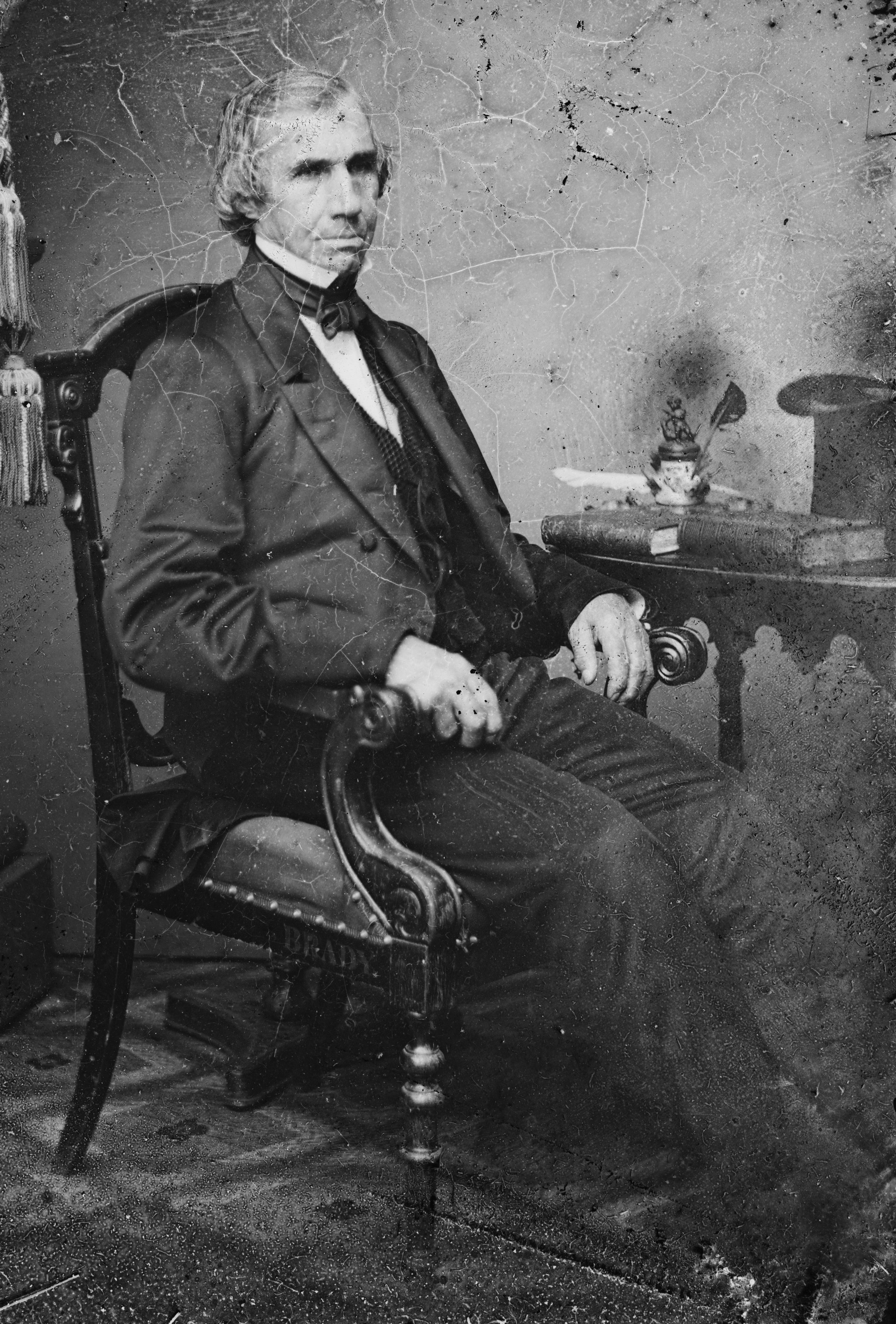

Member of the U.S. House of Representatives from Pennsylvania's 25th district
- In office March 4, 1859 – March 3, 1863
- Preceded by: John Dick
- Succeeded by: District eliminated

Member of the Pennsylvania Senate
- In office 1843–1846

Member of the Pennsylvania House of Representatives
- In office 1836–1837

Personal details
- Born: July 29, 1795 Providence, Rhode Island
- Died: January 9, 1887 (aged 91) Erie, Pennsylvania
- Party: Republican

Elijah Babbitt (July 29, 1795 – January 9, 1887) was a Republican United States Representative from Pennsylvania.

Babbitt was born in Providence, Rhode Island. He moved with his parents to New York State in 1805. He received an academic education and moved to Milton, Pennsylvania, in 1816. He studied law, was admitted to the bar in March 1824 and commenced practice in Milton.

He moved to Erie, Pennsylvania, in 1826 and continued the practice of law. He served as attorney for the borough and subsequently for the city of Erie. He was prosecuting attorney for Erie County, Pennsylvania, in 1833 and served as deputy attorney general for the State in 1834 and 1835. He was a member of the Pennsylvania House of Representatives in 1836 and 1837 and served in the Pennsylvania State Senate from 1843 to 1846.

Babbitt was elected as a Republican to the Thirty-sixth and Thirty-seventh Congresses. He was not a candidate for reelection in 1862. He resumed the practice of law and died in Erie in 1887. He was interred in Erie Cemetery.

== Sources ==
- United States Congress. "Elijah Babbitt (id: B000002)". Biographical Directory of the United States Congress.
- The Political Graveyard

U.S. House of Representatives
Preceded by John Dick	Member of the U.S. House of Representatives from Pennsylvania's 25th congressional district 1859–1863	Succeeded by District eliminated
