= James Mosgrove =

American politician

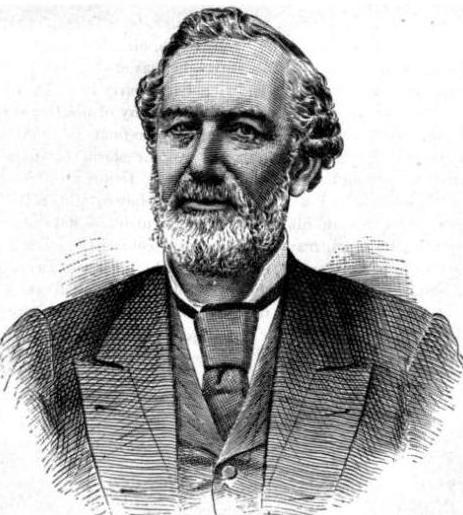

Member of the U.S. House of Representatives from Pennsylvania's 25th district
- In office March 4, 1881 – March 3, 1883
- Preceded by: Harry White
- Succeeded by: John Denniston Patton

Personal details
- Born: June 14, 1821 Kittanning, Pennsylvania
- Died: November 27, 1900 (aged 79) Kittanning, Pennsylvania
- Party: Greenback

James Mosgrove (June 14, 1821 – November 27, 1900) was a Greenback member of the U.S. House of Representatives from Pennsylvania.

== Formative years ==
James Mosgrove was born in Kittanning, Pennsylvania, on June 14, 1821. He attended the common schools.

== Career ==
Prior to his public service career, Mosgrove was engaged in the iron business. In 1878, he was an unsuccessful candidate for elected office. He ran on the Greenback ticket.

Subsequently elected as a Greenback candidate to the Forty-seventh Congress, he declined to be a candidate for renomination in 1882. He also declined to be a candidate for the Democratic nomination for governor.

Mosgrove was engaged in banking and was president of the First National Bank from 1882 until his death.

== Death and interment ==
Mosgrove died in Kittanning on November 27, 1900, and was interred in the Kittanning Cemetery.

== Sources ==
- United States Congress. "James Mosgrove (id: M001030)". Biographical Directory of the United States Congress.
- The Political Graveyard

U.S. House of Representatives
Preceded by Harry White	Member of the U.S. House of Representatives from Pennsylvania's 25th congressional district 1881–1883	Succeeded by John D. Patton
