= Langley Park (Langley Park, Maryland) =

Historic house in Maryland, United States

- U.S. National Register of Historic Places
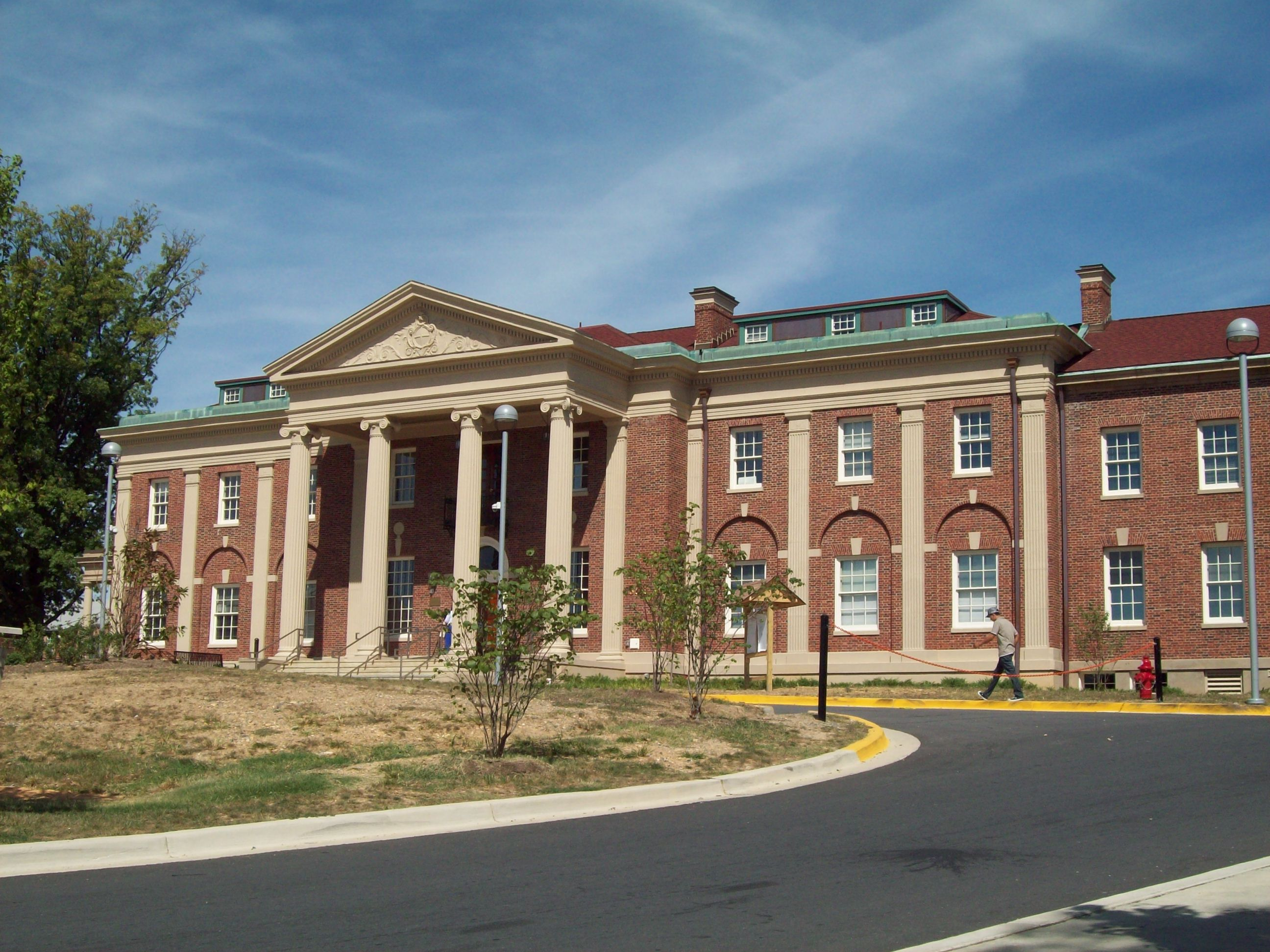
- Langley Park Mansion, September 2010

- Location within Maryland Location within the United States
- Location: 8151 15th Ave., Langley Park, Maryland
- Coordinates: 38°59′26.8″N 76°58′53.3″W
- Area: .6625 acres (0.2681 ha)
- Built: 1924
- Architect: George Oakley Totten Jr.
- Architectural style: Colonial Revival
- NRHP reference No.: 08000809
- Added to NRHP: August 29, 2008

Langley Park, also known as McCormick-Goodhart Mansion, is a Colonial Revival style estate mansion in Langley Park, Prince George's County, Maryland. In 1924, the McCormick-Goodhart family erected an 18,000-square-foot (1,700 m^{2}), 28-room Georgian Revival mansion, designed by architect George Oakley Totten Jr., at a cost of $100,000 that remains a community landmark on 15th Ave.

"Langley Park" references the 540-acre (2.2 km^{2}) estate established in 1923, by the McCormick-Goodhart family in the Chillum District of Prince George's County, Maryland. They named the estate Langley Park after the Goodhart's ancestral home in England, Langley Fields. Frederick Goodhart's wife was Henrietta Laura McCormick, daughter of Leander J. McCormick (1819–1900) who was a founder of what became International Harvester. The estate also included the local historic landmark, the Adelphi Mill.

During the late-1940s and early 1950s, the estate was subdivided and developed as a planned community containing low-rise apartments, semi-detached and single family homes; and a major regional shopping area. The mansion was acquired in 1947 from the McCormick-Goodhart family by the Eudist Order for use as a seminary. The seminary operated until 1963. The mansion then operated until the early 1990s as Willowbrook Montessori School. The mansion reopened in 2010 after a $13.8 million project as a multicultural service center operated by CASA of Maryland.

This property was listed on the National Register of Historic Places on August 29, 2008. It is the ninth property listed as a featured property of the week in a program of the National Park Service that began in July 2008.
