= Alexander Colwell White =

American politician

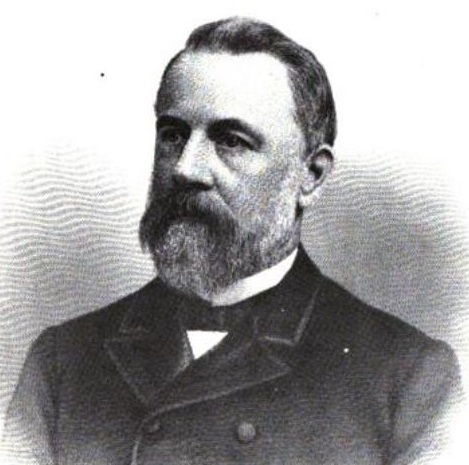
- From Volume II (1899) of Commemorative Biographical Record of Central Pennsylvania

Member of the U.S. House of Representatives from Pennsylvania's 25th district
- In office March 4, 1885 – March 3, 1887
- Preceded by: John Denniston Patton
- Succeeded by: James Thompson Maffett

Personal details
- Born: Alexander Colwell White; December 12, 1833 Kittanning, Pennsylvania, US
- Died: June 11, 1906 (aged 72) Brookville, Pennsylvania, US

Military service
- Allegiance: United States of America
- Branch/service: United States Army; Union Army
- Rank: Private
- Unit: 8th Pennsylvania Reserve Regiment
- Battles/wars: American Civil War

Alexander Colwell White (December 12, 1833 – June 11, 1906) was an American teacher and lawyer from Brookville, Pennsylvania. He represented Pennsylvania in the U.S. House from 1885 to 1887.

== Biography ==
Alexander C. White was born near Kittanning, Pennsylvania. He attended the public schools, and taught school. He attended the Jacksonville Institute and the Dayton Union Academy. He moved to Jefferson County, Pennsylvania, in 1860 where he studied law. He was admitted to the bar in 1862, and commenced practice in Punxsutawney, Pennsylvania.

During the American Civil War, White enlisted in the Union Army as a private in Company I, Eighth Regiment, Pennsylvania Volunteer Infantry.

After the war, he moved to Brookville, Pennsylvania, and continued the practice of his profession. He was elected district attorney in 1867 and 1870.

White was elected as a Republican to the Forty-ninth Congress. He was not a candidate for reelection in 1886 to the Fiftieth Congress. He resumed the practice of his profession, and served as justice of the peace for Rose Township, Pennsylvania. He died near Brookville. Interment in Brookville Cemetery.

U.S. House of Representatives
Preceded by John D. Patton	Member of the U.S. House of Representatives from Pennsylvania's 25th congressional district 1885–1887	Succeeded by James T. Maffett
