= Arnold Plumer =

American politician

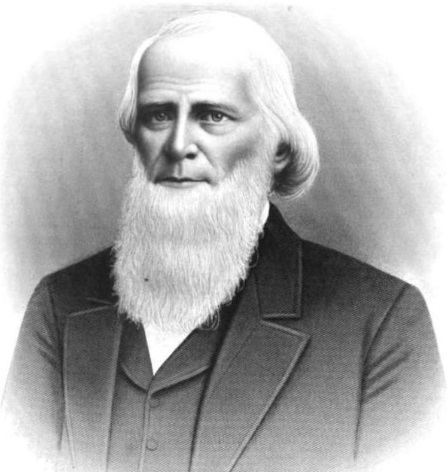
- From 1890's History of Venango County, Pennsylvania

19th Treasurer of Pennsylvania
- In office 1848–1849
- Preceded by: John Banks
- Succeeded by: Gideon J. Ball

Member of the U.S. House of Representatives from Pennsylvania's 25th district
- In office March 4, 1841 – March 3, 1843
- Preceded by: John Galbraith
- Succeeded by: District eliminated
- In office March 4, 1837 – March 3, 1839
- Preceded by: John Galbraith
- Succeeded by: John Galbraith

Personal details
- Born: Arnold Plumer; June 6, 1801 Cooperstown, Pennsylvania
- Died: April 28, 1869 (aged 67) Franklin, Pennsylvania
- Resting place: Franklin Cemetery
- Party: Democratic

Arnold Plumer (June 6, 1801 – April 28, 1869) was a member of the U.S. House of Representatives from Pennsylvania, serving two nonconsecutive terms in the mid-19th century.

== Early life ==
Arnold Plumer was born near Cooperstown, Pennsylvania. He was privately tutored at home and completed preparatory studies. He served as sheriff of Venango County, Pennsylvania, in 1823 and prothonotary of the county in 1829 and clerk of the courts and recorder from 1830 to 1836.

== Political career ==
Plumer was elected as a Democrat to the Twenty-fifth Congress. He was appointed marshal of the United States District Court for the Western District of Pennsylvania by President Martin Van Buren on May 20, 1839, and served until May 6, 1841.

=== Congress ===
He was elected to the Twenty-seventh Congress. He was again appointed United States Marshal for the Western District of Pennsylvania on December 14, 1847, and served until April 3, 1848, when he resigned.

=== Later career and death ===
He was State Treasurer of Pennsylvania in 1848. He was a delegate to the 1860 Democratic National Convention.

He engaged in mining and banking enterprises and died in Franklin, Pennsylvania on April 28, 1869. He was interred in Franklin Cemetery.

== Sources ==
- United States Congress. "Arnold Plumer (id: P000391)". Biographical Directory of the United States Congress.
- The Political Graveyard

U.S. House of Representatives
Preceded by John Galbraith	Member of the U.S. House of Representatives from Pennsylvania's 25th congressional district 1837–1839	Succeeded by John Galbraith
Preceded by John Galbraith	Member of the U.S. House of Representatives from Pennsylvania's 25th congressional district 1841–1843	Succeeded by District eliminated
