= John Dick (politician) =

American politician and judge

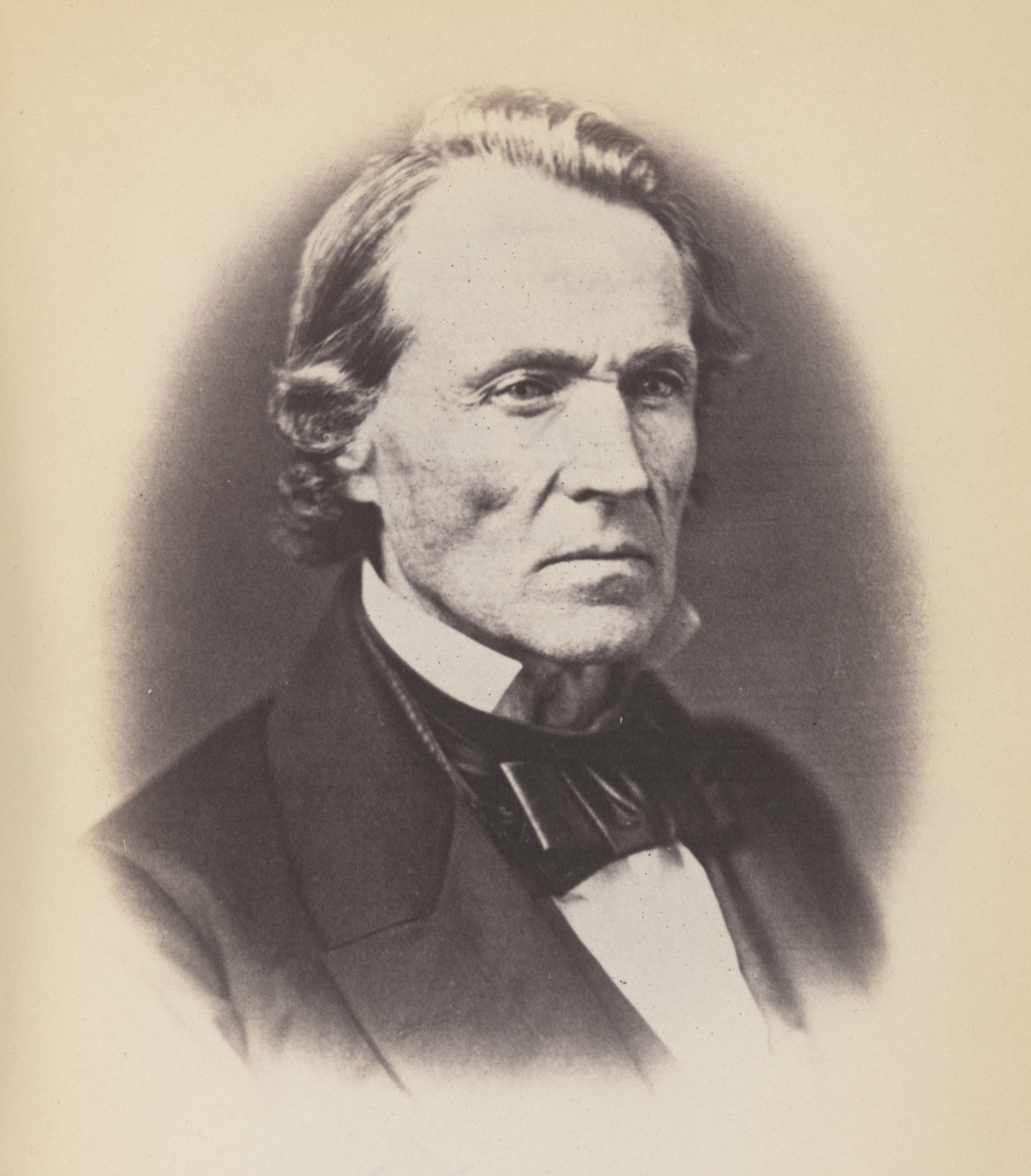
- Portrait of John Dick, American politician and judge

Member of the U.S. House of Representatives from Pennsylvania's 25th district
- In office March 4, 1853 – March 3, 1859
- Preceded by: William Henry Kurtz
- Succeeded by: Elijah Babbitt

Personal details
- Born: June 17, 1794 Pittsburgh, Pennsylvania, US
- Died: May 29, 1872 (aged 77)
- Party: Whig; Republican

John Dick (June 17, 1794 – May 29, 1872) was an American politician and judge. He represented Pennsylvania as a Whig, a member of the Whig and a Republican in the United States House of Representatives.

== Biography ==
John Dick was born on June 17, 1794, in Pittsburgh, Pennsylvania. With his parents, he moved to Meadville, Pennsylvania while less than a year old, in December 1794. He attended and received his education at the common schools. He served as major of the First Battalion of the Pennsylvania Militia in 1821. Dick then served as colonel of the First Regiment in 1825 before becoming brigadier general of the Second Brigade, Sixteenth Division of the Pennsylvania Militia in 1831. After his militia service, he moved into mercantile business and banking, establishing the banking house J.&J.R. Dick in 1850. He subsequently served as associate judge of Crawford County, Pennsylvania and was a supporter of the Atlantic and Great Western Railroad. Dick also served as a trustee of Allegheny College and president of Crawford Mutual Insurance Company.

Dick was elected to the United States House of Representatives as a Whig in 1852 for the 33rd Congress. He was reelected in 1854 as a Whig Party candidate to the 34th Congress. In 1856, Dick was reelected as a Republican to the 35th Congress. He was renominated by the Republican Party in 1858 but withdrew his name from the election and resumed business interests.

He was married, November 16, 1830, to Jane Torbett, and had six children. Son George was as cadet at West Point in 1850, assigned to duty in Texas in Col. Robert E. Lee’s regiment, and died in 1856. Son J. Henry died at the age of eighteen. His son, Samuel Bernard Dick, was a Union Colonel in the Civil War.

Dick died in Meadville, Pennsylvania on May 29, 1872.

U.S. House of Representatives
Preceded by William H. Kurtz	Member of the U.S. House of Representatives from Pennsylvania's 25th congressional district 1853–1859	Succeeded by Elijah Babbitt
