= Charles I. Faddis =

American politician

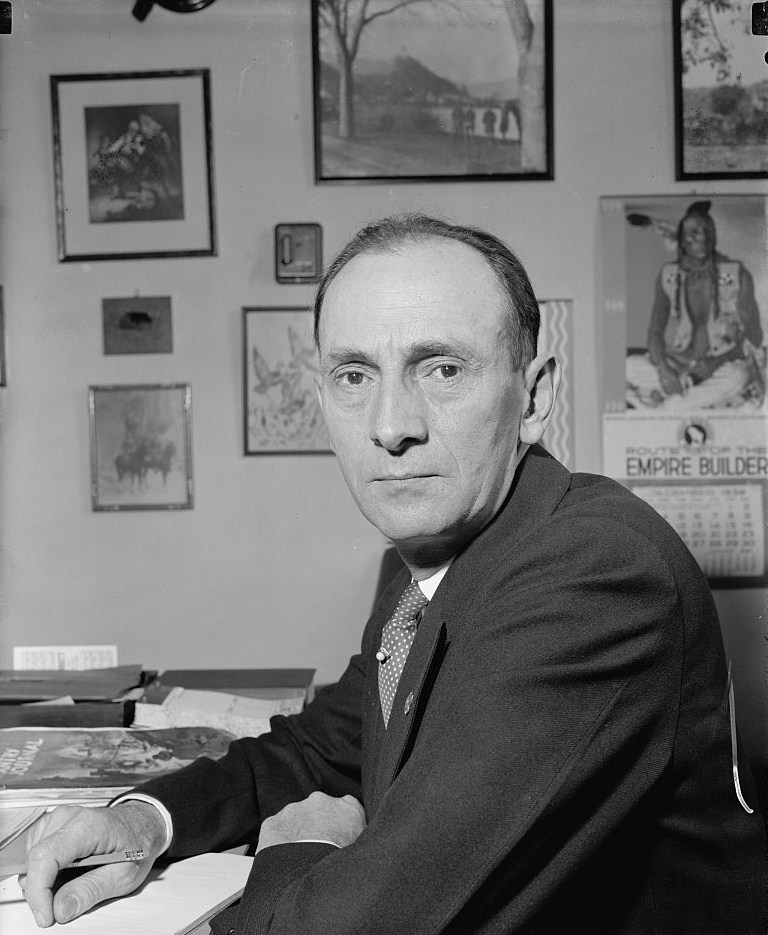

Member of the U.S. House of Representatives from Pennsylvania's 25th district
- In office March 4, 1933 – December 4, 1942
- Preceded by: Henry W. Temple
- Succeeded by: Grant Furlong

Personal details
- Born: June 13, 1890 Loudonville, Ohio, U.S.
- Died: April 1, 1972 (aged 81) Mazatlán, Sinaloa, Mexico
- Party: Democratic
- Education: Pennsylvania State College

Charles Isiah Faddis (June 13, 1890 – April 1, 1972) was a Democratic member of the United States House of Representatives from Pennsylvania.

== Early life and education ==
Charles I. Faddis was born in Loudonville, Ohio. He moved with his parents to Waynesburg, Pennsylvania, in 1891. He attended Waynesburg College, and graduated from the agricultural department of Pennsylvania State College at State College, Pennsylvania, in 1915.

== Mexican and First World War service ==
Faddis served as a sergeant in the Tenth Infantry, Pennsylvania National Guard, on the Mexican border in 1916. During the First World War he served with the Forty-seventh Regiment, United States Infantry, and the Fourth Ammunition Train. He rose to rank of lieutenant colonel of Infantry, and served in the Army of Occupation in Germany. During his service he was awarded the Purple Heart.

After the war, he was engaged in the general contracting business in Waynesburg, PA, from 1919 to 1926, but then he returned to attend the United States Army Command and General Staff College in Fort Leavenworth, Kansas, in 1930.

== Representative from Pennsylvania ==
Faddis was elected as a Democrat to the Seventy-third and to the four succeeding Congresses and served from March 4, 1933, until his resignation on December 4, 1942, to enter the United States Army. He was an unsuccessful candidate for renomination in 1942.

== Second World War service ==
During the Second World War, Faddis was a colonel in the United States Army. During the war he was awarded the Purple Heart and the Bronze Star.

== Post war activities ==
After the war, he was engaged in raising Hereford cattle, producing oil and gas, and operating coal mines. He died in Mazatlán, Sinaloa, Mexico, and is buried in Rosemont Cemetery in Rogersville, Pennsylvania.

U.S. House of Representatives
Preceded by Henry W. Temple	Member of the U.S. House of Representatives from Pennsylvania's 25th congressional district 1933–1942	Succeeded by Grant Furlong
