= Eugene Atkinson =

American politician (1927–2016)

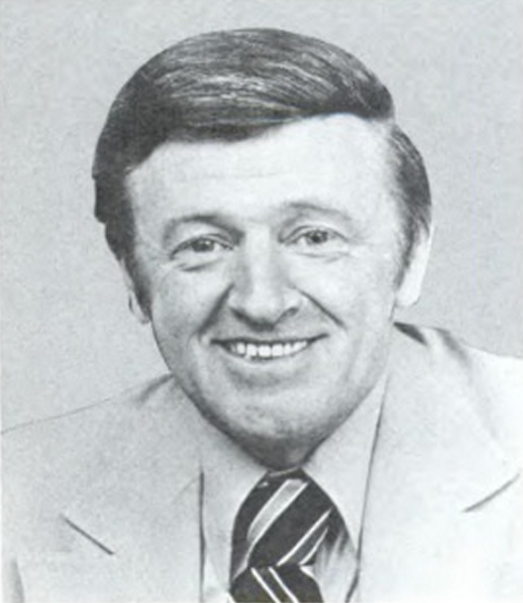
- Atkinson pictured during his first term in Congress, c. 1979

Member of the U.S. House of Representatives from Pennsylvania's 25th district
- In office January 3, 1979 – January 3, 1983
- Preceded by: Gary A. Myers
- Succeeded by: District eliminated

Personal details
- Born: Eugene Vincent Atkinson; April 5, 1927 Aliquippa, Pennsylvania
- Died: August 4, 2016 (aged 89) Aliquippa, Pennsylvania
- Party: Republican (from 1981); Democratic (until 1981)

Eugene Vincent Atkinson (April 5, 1927 – August 4, 2016) was an American politician who, from 1979 to 1983, served two-terms as a member of the U.S. House of Representatives from Pennsylvania.

== Early life and career ==
Atkinson was born in the Pittsburgh Metro Area city of Aliquippa, Pennsylvania. He graduated from the University of Pittsburgh. Atkinson was the director of customs for the port of Pittsburgh from 1962 to 1969. Atkinson then served as the Beaver County commissioner from 1972 to 1978.

== Tenure ==
In 1978, he was elected to the U.S. House as a member of the Democratic Party.

Atkinson was an early supporter of Jimmy Carter in 1976, but in 1980 Atkinson endorsed Senator Ted Kennedy for President. At rallies for Kennedy, Atkinson praised Kennedy's leadership.

While Atkinson was on a radio call-in show in 1981, President Ronald Reagan called into the show and persuaded Atkinson to support Reagan’s proposed budget cuts. Reagan was calling from his Washington, D.C., hospital bed while recovering from a gunshot wound as a result of an assassination attempt.

On October 14, 1981, Atkinson switched parties, joining the Republican Party. Atkinson claimed at the time that the switch was a result of Democratic reaction to his support of Reagan’s agenda. New York Republican Representative John LeBoutillier led the congressional effort to coax Atkinson to switch parties.

After the switch, House Speaker Tip O’Neill predicted Atkinson would be defeated in his next election. The prediction proved accurate, as Atkinson subsequently lost his 1982 re-election by a 21 percentage point margin to Joseph P. Kolter.

== Death ==
Atkinson died on August 4, 2016, at the age of 89.

== See also ==
- List of American politicians who switched parties in office
- List of United States representatives who switched parties

== Sources ==
- United States Congress. "Eugene Atkinson (id: A000329)". Biographical Directory of the United States Congress.
- The Political Graveyard

U.S. House of Representatives
Preceded by Gary A. Myers	Member of the U.S. House of Representatives from Pennsylvania's 25th congressional district 1979–1983	Succeeded by District eliminated
