= John Denniston Patton =

American politician

Member of the U.S. House of Representatives from Pennsylvania's 25th district
- In office March 4, 1883 – March 3, 1885
- Preceded by: James Mosgrove
- Succeeded by: Alexander Colwell White

Personal details
- Born: November 28, 1829 Indiana, Pennsylvania
- Died: February 22, 1904 (aged 74) Indiana, Pennsylvania
- Party: Democratic

John Denniston Patton (November 28, 1829 – February 22, 1904) was a U.S. representative from the state of Pennsylvania.

Patton was born in Indiana, Pennsylvania and attended public school there. He worked in a tannery for several years and then engaged in mercantile pursuits in his hometown. He was elected as a Democrat to the forty-eighth Congress, serving from March 4, 1883 to March 3, 1885. He declined to be a candidate for renomination in 1884, after which he retired from public life. Patton died in Indiana, Pennsylvania and was interred in Oakland Cemetery there.

== Sources ==
- United States Congress. "John Denniston Patton (id: P000139)". Biographical Directory of the United States Congress.
- The Political Graveyard

U.S. House of Representatives
Preceded by James Mosgrove	Member of the U.S. House of Representatives from Pennsylvania's 25th congressional district 1883–1885	Succeeded by Alexander C. White
