= Charles Champlain Townsend =

American politician

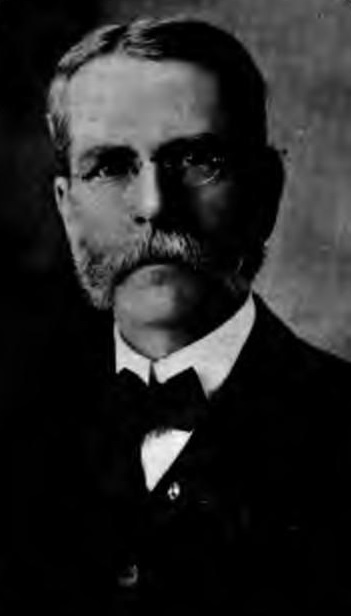
- From Volume I (1904) of History of Beaver County, Pennsylvania: And Its Centennial Celebration

Member of the U.S. House of Representatives from Pennsylvania's 25th congressional district
- In office March 4, 1889 – March 3, 1891
- Preceded by: James T. Maffett
- Succeeded by: Eugene P. Gillespie

Personal details
- Born: November 24, 1841 Allegheny, Pennsylvania, U.S.
- Died: July 10, 1910 (aged 68) New Brighton, Pennsylvania, U.S.
- Party: Republican
- Education: University of Pittsburgh

Charles Champlain Townsend (November 24, 1841 – July 10, 1910) was a Republican member of the U.S. House of Representatives from Pennsylvania.

== Biography ==
Charles C. Townsend was born in Allegheny, Pennsylvania (now a part of Pittsburgh). He attended the common schools and then the University of Pittsburgh (then known as the Western University of Pennsylvania) in Pittsburgh.

He worked as a manufacturer of wire rivets and nails. During the American Civil War, he served two years in the Union Army as a private in Company A, Ninth Regiment, Pennsylvania Volunteer Reserve Corps, and later as adjutant of the First Pennsylvania Volunteer Cavalry.

Townsend was elected as a Republican to the Fifty-first Congress. He was not a candidate for renomination in 1890, but resumed his work in manufacturing.

== Death and interment ==
Townsend died in New Brighton, Pennsylvania, in 1910, and was interred in the Grove Cemetery.

U.S. House of Representatives
Preceded by James T. Maffett	Member of the U.S. House of Representatives from Pennsylvania's 25th congressional district 1889–1891	Succeeded by Eugene P. Gillespie
