= Frank M. Clark =

American politician

Frank Clark
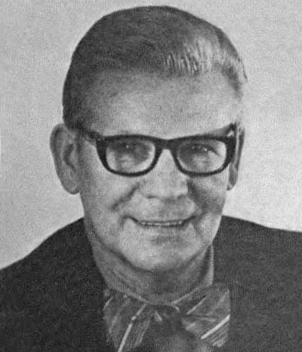

Member of the U.S. House of Representatives from Pennsylvania's 25th district
- In office January 3, 1955 – January 3, 1975
- Preceded by: Louis E. Graham
- Succeeded by: Gary A. Myers

Personal details
- Born: Frank Monroe Clark; December 24, 1915 Bessemer, Pennsylvania, U.S.
- Died: June 17, 2003 (aged 87) New Castle, Pennsylvania, U.S.
- Party: Democratic
- Education: Pittsburgh Institute of Aeronautics

Frank Monroe Clark (December 24, 1915 – June 17, 2003) was a Democratic member of the U.S. House of Representatives from Pennsylvania.

== Early life and military service ==
Frank Clark was born in Bessemer, Pennsylvania. He attended the Pittsburgh Institute of Aeronautics, and enlisted in the United States Army Air Corps in 1942, serving in Europe as a flight officer until discharged in 1945. Clark later became a major in the Air Force Reserve.

== Public service ==
While still in the service, Clark was appointed as the chief of police of Bessemer, serving in that capacity until November 1954.

He was an unsuccessful candidate for election to Congress in 1952. He was elected as a Democrat in 1954 to the 84th United States Congress, defeating incumbent Republican Congressman Louis E. Graham, and was re-elected to the nine succeeding Congresses, serving until his resignation on December 31, 1974, following his defeat in the 1974 election to Republican Gary A. Myers.

After his loss to Myers, Clark continued to send massive amounts of mail to his former constituents stating they were from 'your Congressman Frank M. Clark' when he had been out of office for five months. Clark won only 34 of 244 votes for the post of Clerk of the House.

He pleaded guilty to mail fraud and tax evasion on February 13, 1979. He was unsuccessful in seeking re-election in 1976, 1978, 1986, and 1990.

He was a delegate to a number of conferences, including:

- the North Atlantic Treaty Organization Conference 1956–1974
- the Inter-Parliamentary Union Conference in Germany in 1957
- the Christian Leadership for Peace Conference at The Hague in 1958
- the International Roads Conference in 1959 and 1962–1968.

He died in New Castle, Pennsylvania, on June 17, 2003.

== See also ==
- List of American federal politicians convicted of crimes
- List of federal political scandals in the United States

U.S. House of Representatives
Preceded by Louis E. Graham	Member of the U.S. House of Representatives from Pennsylvania's 25th congressional district 1955–1974	Succeeded by Gary A. Myers
