= Harry White (Pennsylvania politician) =

American politician (1834–1920)

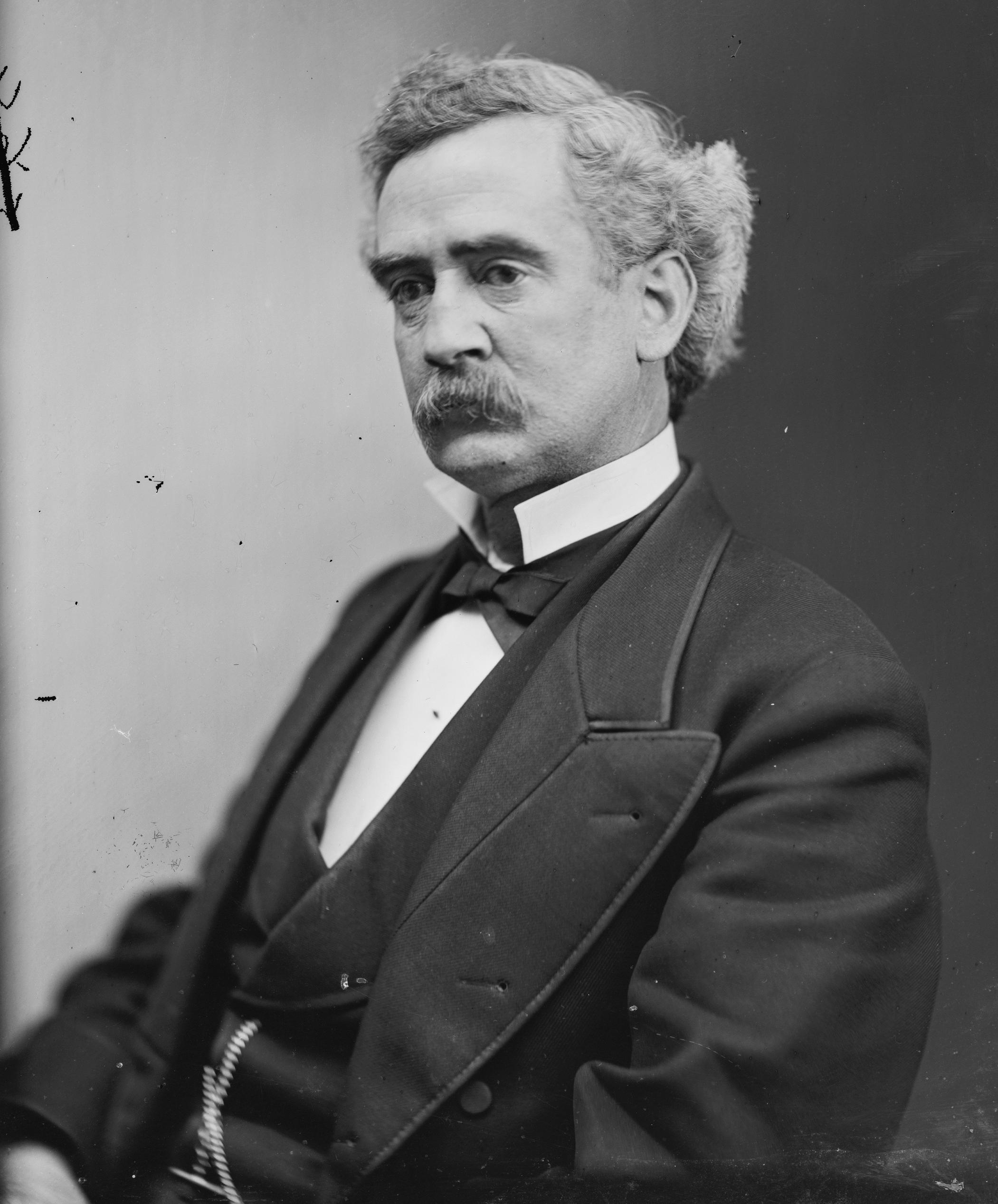

Member of the U.S. House of Representatives from Pennsylvania's 25th district
- In office March 4, 1877 – March 3, 1881
- Preceded by: George A. Jenks
- Succeeded by: James Mosgrove

Personal details
- Born: January 12, 1834 Indiana, Pennsylvania
- Died: June 23, 1920 (aged 86) Indiana, Pennsylvania
- Party: Republican

Harry White (January 12, 1834 – June 23, 1920) was a Republican member of the U.S. House of Representatives from Pennsylvania.

== Biography ==
Harry White was born in Indiana, Pennsylvania. He attended the Indiana Academy, and was graduated from Princeton College in 1854. He studied law, was admitted to the bar in June 1855 and commenced practice in Indiana, Pennsylvania. He entered the Union Army as major of the Sixty-seventh Regiment, Pennsylvania Volunteer Infantry, on December 13, 1861. Mustered out February 22, 1865. He was a member of the Pennsylvania State Senate during his military service and attended its sessions in the winter of 1862 to 1863. He was reelected to the State Senate and served from 1865 to 1874, being speaker at the close of the last term. He was a delegate to the State constitutional convention in 1872. He was an unsuccessful candidate for Governor of Pennsylvania in 1872.

White was elected as a Republican to the Forty-fifth and Forty-sixth Congresses. He was not a candidate for renomination in 1880. He was elected a judge of Indiana County, Pennsylvania, in 1884. He was reelected in 1894 and served until 1904; resumed the practice of law and engaged in banking. He died in Indiana, Pennsylvania, in 1920. Interment in Oakland Cemetery.

== Bibliography ==
Shankman, Arnold. "John P. Penney, Harry White and the 1864 Pennsylvania Senate Deadlock". Western Pennsylvania Historical Magazine 55 (January 1972): 77-86.

U.S. House of Representatives
Preceded by George A. Jenks	Member of the U.S. House of Representatives from Pennsylvania's 25th congressional district 1877–1881	Succeeded by James Mosgrove
