= Gladys Sylvani =

British actress(1884-1953)

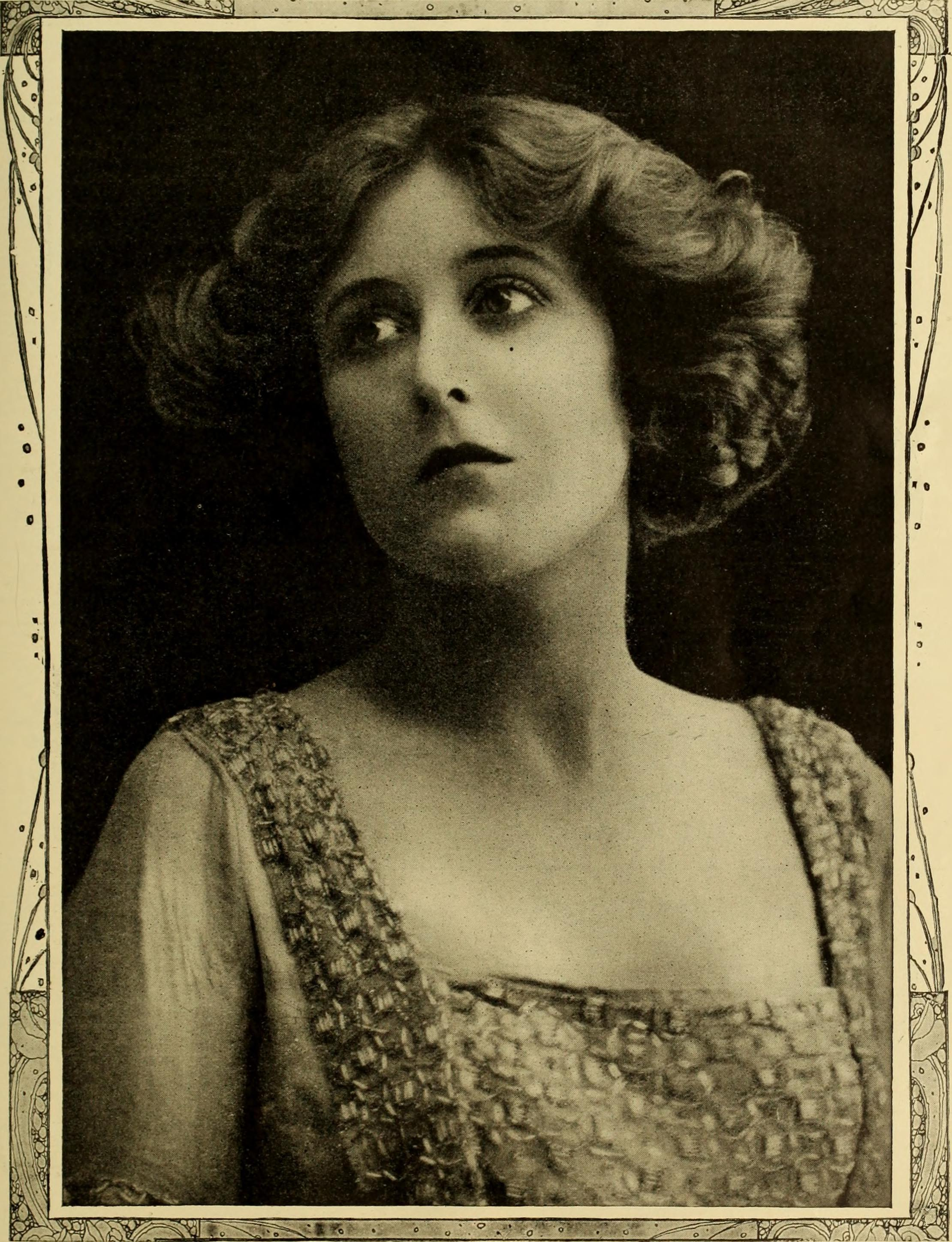
- Born: Gladys Sylvani Smith; 18 December 1884; London, England
- Died: 1953; Alexandria, Virginia, USA

Gladys Sylvani (18 December 1884 – 1953) was a British actress. One of Britain's first film stars, during her career, she was described as "the most popular of all English picture actresses".

== Biography ==
She was born Gladys Sylvani Smith in Holloway, London. Before her work in films, Sylvani had performed on stage. She was part of a group of actors who appeared regularly in silent films by Cecil Hepworth. Sylvani retired while at the peak of her career. In 1939, she moved to the United States. She died in Alexandria, Virginia.

== Filmography ==
- The Greatest of These (1911)
- A Sprained Ankle (1911)
- Twin Roses (1911)
- Mother's Boy (1911)
- Wealthy Brother John (1911)
- A Double Deception (1911)
- All's Right with the World (1911)
- Rachel's Sin (1911)
- The Three Lovers (1911)
- Harry the Footballer (1911)
- Till Death Us Do Part (1911)
- The Stolen Letters (1911)
- Jim of the Mounted Police (1911)
- The Torn Letter (1911)
- Love and a Sewing-machine (1911)
- The Deception (1912)
- The Heart of a Woman (1912)
- Love in a Laundry (1912)
- Church and Stage (1912)
- A Woman's Wit (1912)
- The Coiner's Den (1912)
- A Fisherman's Love Story (1912)
- Her Only Son (1912)
- Mary Has Her Way (1912)
- Jasmine (1912)
- Our Bessie (1912)
- The Bachelor's Ward (1912)
- The Editor and the Millionaire (1912)
- A Girl Alone (1912)
- Love Wins in the End (1912)
- At the Eleventh Hour (1912)
- The Traitress of Parton's Court (1912)
- Jimmy Lester, Convict and Gentleman (1912)
- Pamela's Party (1912)
- Fisherman's Luck (1913)
