= Clarion Township, Pennsylvania =

Township in Pennsylvania, US

Coordinates: 41°12′01″N 79°19′26″W

- Township
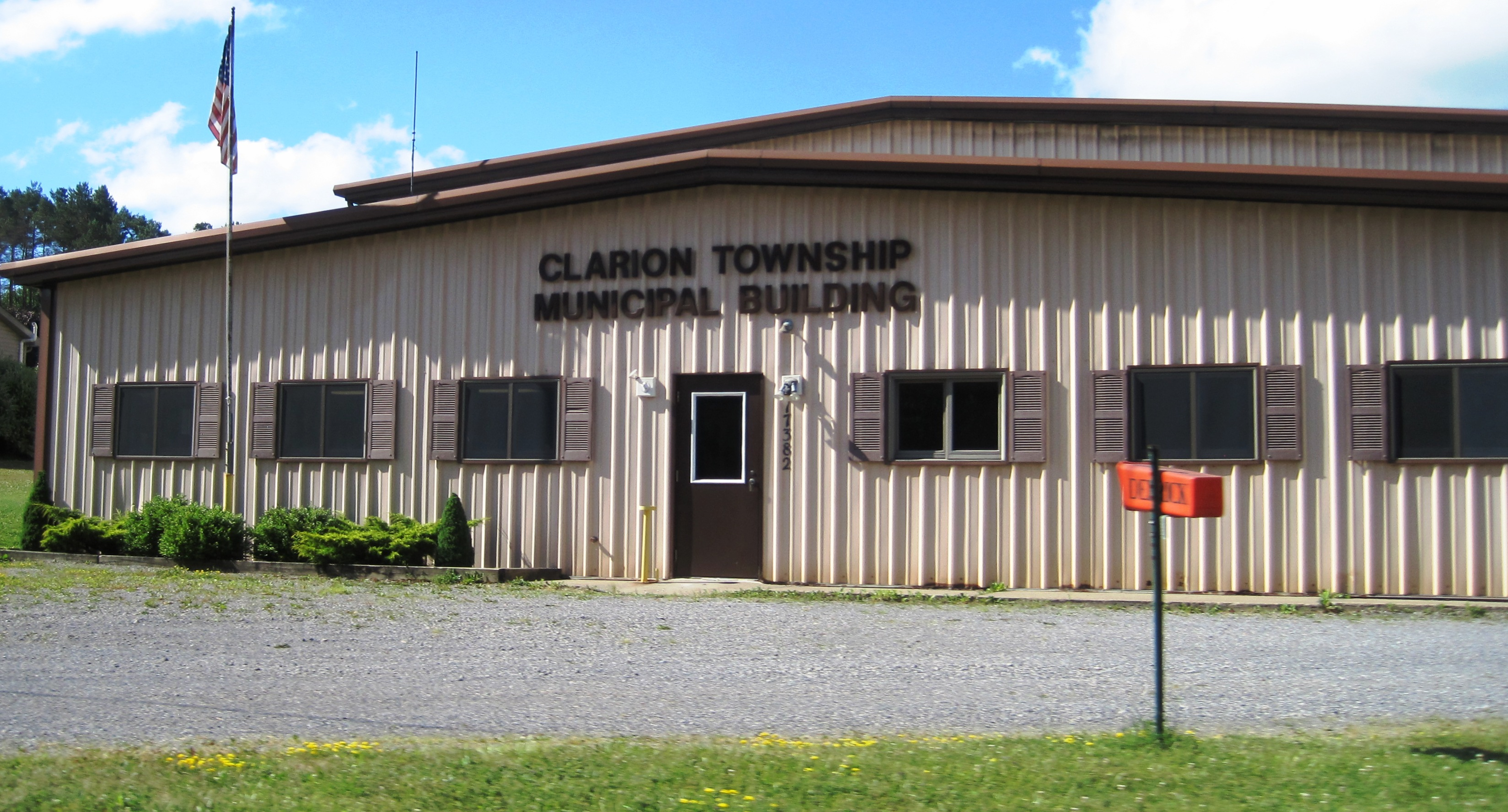
- Clarion Township Municipal Building

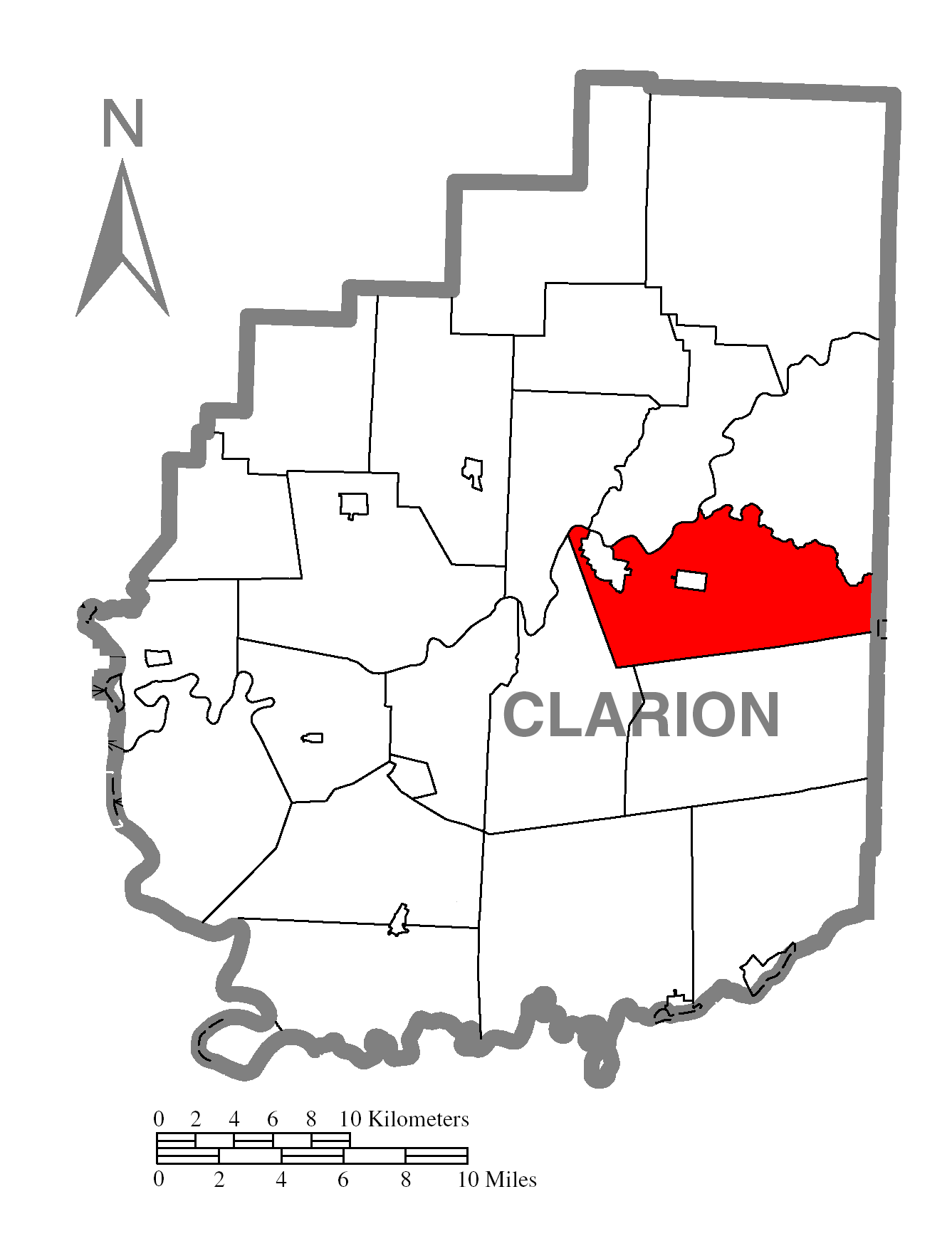
- Map of Clarion County, Pennsylvania highlighting Clarion Township

- Map of Clarion County, Pennsylvania
- Country: United States
- State: Pennsylvania
- County: Clarion
- Incorporated: 1806

Area
  - Total: 31.53 sq mi (81.67 km^{2})
  - Land: 31.26 sq mi (80.96 km^{2})
  - Water: 0.27 sq mi (0.71 km^{2})

Population (2020)
  - Total: 3,647 ▼
  - Estimate (2023): 3,577
  - Density: 116.7/sq mi (45.05/km^{2})
- Time zone: UTC-5 (Eastern (EST))
  - Summer (DST): UTC-4 (EDT)
- FIPS code: 42-031-13808

Clarion Township is a township in Clarion County, Pennsylvania, United States. The population was 3,647 at the 2020 census, a decrease from the figure of 4,116 tabulated in 2010, which was, in turn, an increase over the total of 3,273 at the 2000 census.

== Geography ==
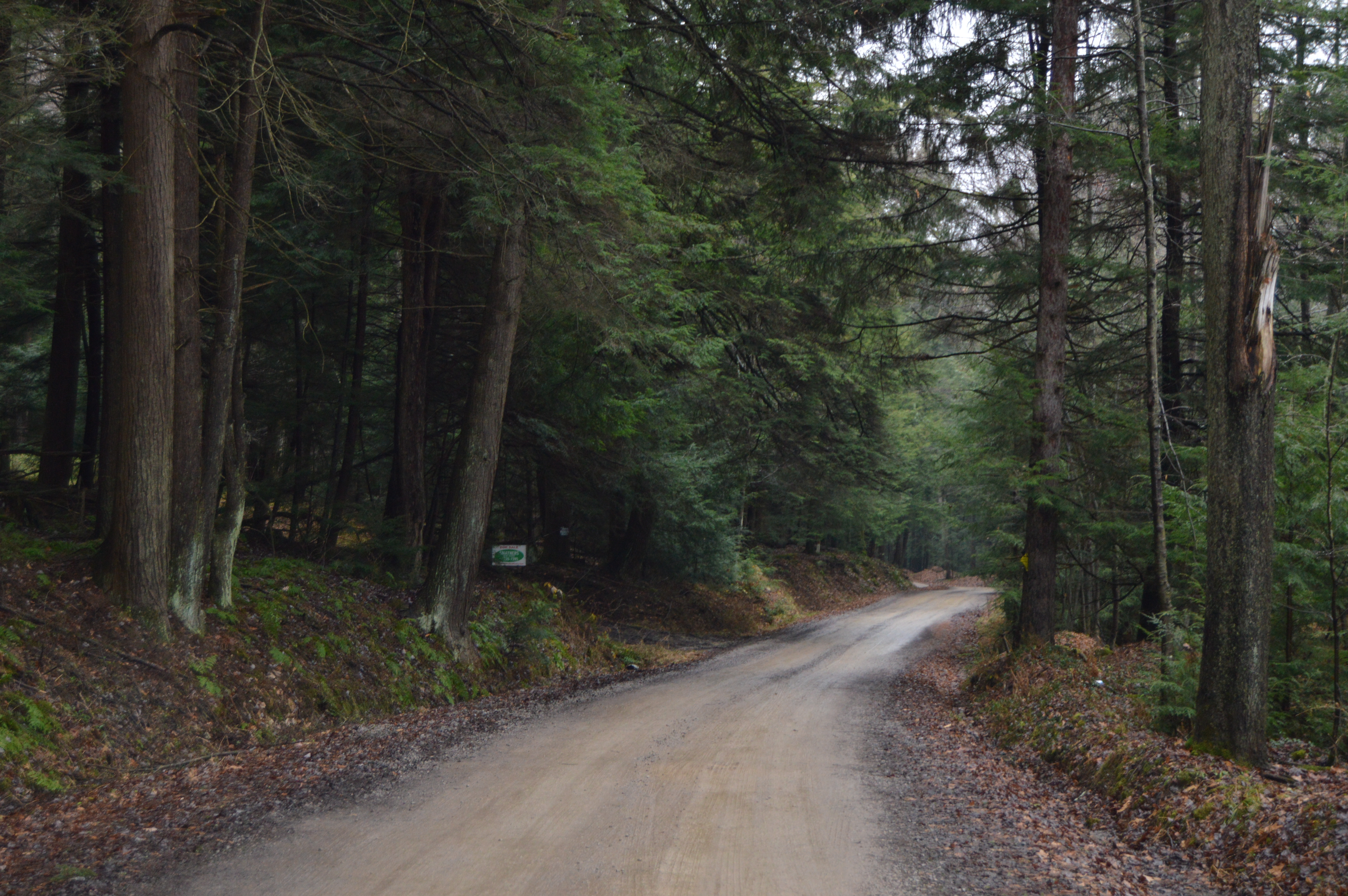
Forest scene north of Strattanville

Clarion Township is located in east-central Clarion County, bordered to the east by Jefferson County and to the north by the Clarion River and its tributary, Mill Creek. The borough of Clarion, the county seat, is in the western part of the township, and the borough of Strattanville is in the center. The boroughs are independent of the township. According to the United States Census Bureau, the township has a total area of 31.5 square miles (81.7 km^{2}), of which 31.3 square miles (81.0 km^{2}) is land and 0.3 square miles (0.7 km^{2}), or 0.87%, is water.

Interstate 80 runs east–west through the southern part of the township, with access from exits 64 and 70. U.S. Route 322 is a local highway that runs through the center of the township and passes through Strattanville and Clarion.

== Demographics ==
Historical population
Census	Pop.	Note	%±
2010	4,116		—
2020	3,647		−11.4%
2023 (est.)	3,577		−1.9%
U.S. Decennial Census

As of the census of 2000, there were 3,273 people, 1,386 households, and 874 families residing in the township. The population density was 104.0 inhabitants per square mile (40.2/km^{2}). There were 1,599 housing units at an average density of 50.8 per square mile (19.6/km^{2}). The racial makeup of the township was 97.04% White, 1.65% African American, 0.06% Native American, 0.21% Asian, 0.12% from other races, and 0.92% from two or more races. Hispanic or Latino of any race were 0.40% of the population.

There were 1,386 households, out of which 28.4% had children under the age of 18 living with them, 47.4% were married couples living together, 12.6% had a female householder with no husband present, and 36.9% were non-families. 27.1% of all households were made up of individuals, and 9.9% had someone living alone who was 65 years of age or older. The average household size was 2.35 and the average family size was 2.83.

In the township the population was spread out, with 21.3% under the age of 18, 13.4% from 18 to 24, 28.7% from 25 to 44, 22.2% from 45 to 64, and 14.4% who were 65 years of age or older. The median age was 36 years. For every 100 females there were 97.3 males. For every 100 females age 18 and over, there were 95.3 males.

The median income for a household in the township was $28,818, and the median income for a family was $34,091. Males had a median income of $27,240 versus $16,642 for females. The per capita income for the township was $16,442. About 13.9% of families and 16.7% of the population were below the poverty line, including 18.7% of those under age 18 and 9.1% of those age 65 or over.
