= Thomas Wharton Phillips =

American politician

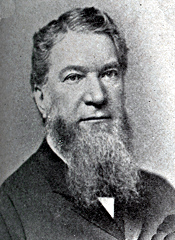

Member of the U.S. House of Representatives from Pennsylvania's 25th district
- In office March 4, 1893 – March 3, 1897
- Preceded by: Eugene P. Gillespie
- Succeeded by: Joseph B. Showalter

Personal details
- Born: February 23, 1835 Mount Jackson, Pennsylvania, U.S.
- Died: July 12, 1912 (aged 77) New Castle, Pennsylvania, U.S.
- Spouses: Clarinda Hardman (m. 1862; died 1866) Pamphila Hardman (m. 1871)
- Children: Thomas Wharton Phillips Jr.

Thomas Wharton Phillips (February 23, 1835 – July 21, 1912) was a Republican member of the U.S. House of Representatives from Pennsylvania.

== Early life ==
Phillips was born near Mount Jackson, Pennsylvania, in that section of Beaver County, Pennsylvania, now included in Lawrence County, Pennsylvania. He was the son of Ephram Phillips (1795–1835) and Ann Phillips (1796–1866). Phillips is a descendant of the Reverend George Phillips.

He attended the common schools and was also privately instructed.

== Career ==
He engaged in the production of oil, and served as president of the Producers’ Protective Association from 1887 to 1890. He was president of the Citizens’ National Bank of New Castle, Pennsylvania, and a member of the board of trustees of Bethany College, West Virginia, and of Hiram College, Ohio.

Phillips was elected as a Republican to the Fifty-third and Fifty-fourth Congresses. He was the chairman of the United States House Committee on Labor during the Fifty-fourth Congress. He did not seek renomination in 1896. He resumed his former pursuits, and was appointed a member of the United States Industrial Commission by President William McKinley and served until its dissolution. He was a delegate to the Republican National Convention in 1908.

In 1906, Phillips was approached by his friend, Dr. Ely Zollars, for help in establishing a bible college in what was then the Oklahoma Territory. Mr. Phillips agreed to pay Dr. Zollars' salary for one year while his friend sought to secure a location for the school. Phillips became a longtime benefactor of the school which was initially called Oklahoma Christian University.

== Personal life ==
Phillips was twice married. His first marriage was in 1862 to Clarinda Hardman (1837–1866), the daughter of David Hardman and Nancy Rebecca (née Arter) Hardman. Together, they were the parents of:

- Herbert Clyde Phillips (1864–1912), who married Idell Houghton in 1894.
- Norman Arter Phillips (1865–1893), a banker.

After the death of his first wife, he remarried in 1871 to his late wife's younger sister, Pamphila Hardman (1844–1933). Together, they were the parents of:

- Victor Karl Phillips (1872–1901), who married Mary Mayme Lusk in 1898.
- Thomas Wharton Phillips Jr. (1874–1956), also a U.S. Representative from Pennsylvania.
- Benjamin D. Phillips (1885–1968), who served as a member of the board of Citizens National Bank for 50 years. He married Undine Conant, and after her death, Mildred Welshimer.

Phillips died in New Castle on July 21, 1912. He was buried in Oak Park Cemetery, New Castle, Pennsylvania.

=== Legacy ===
Upon Phillips' death the trustees voted to change the name of the school to Phillips University in his honor. The university closed in 1998, but Phillips Theological Seminary which separated from the university in 1987, continues to exist as of 2016.

== Sources ==
- United States Congress. "Thomas W. Phillips (id: P000313)". Biographical Directory of the United States Congress.
- The Political Graveyard

U.S. House of Representatives
Preceded by Eugene P. Gillespie	Member of the U.S. House of Representatives from Pennsylvania's 25th congressional district 1893–1897	Succeeded by Joseph B. Showalter
