= Pennsylvania's congressional delegations =

District boundaries since 2023

These are tables of congressional delegations from Pennsylvania to the United States House of Representatives and the United States Senate.

The current dean of the Pennsylvania delegation is Representative Glenn Thompson, having served in the House since 2009.

== United States House of Representatives ==
=== Current members ===
List of members, their terms in office, district boundaries, and the district political ratings according to the CPVI. The delegation has 17 members, with 10 Republicans and 7 Democrats.

District	CPVI	Representative (Hometown)	Party	Time in office	District map
1st	D+1	Brian Fitzpatrick (Levittown)	Republican	since January 3, 2017	
2nd	D+19	Brendan Boyle (Philadelphia)	Democratic	since January 3, 2015	
3rd	D+40	Dwight Evans (Philadelphia)	Democratic	since November 14, 2016	
4th	D+8	Madeleine Dean (Jenkintown)	Democratic	since January 3, 2019	
5th	D+15	Mary Gay Scanlon (Swarthmore)	Democratic	since November 13, 2018	
6th	D+6	Chrissy Houlahan (Devon)	Democratic	since January 3, 2019	
7th	R+1	Ryan Mackenzie (Lower Macungie Township)	Republican	since January 3, 2025	
8th	R+4	Rob Bresnahan (Dallas Township)	Republican	since January 3, 2025	
9th	R+19	Dan Meuser (Dallas)	Republican	since January 3, 2019	
10th	R+3	Scott Perry (Dillsburg)	Republican	since January 3, 2013	
11th	R+11	Lloyd Smucker (Lancaster)	Republican	since January 3, 2017	
12th	D+10	Summer Lee (Swissvale)	Democratic	since January 3, 2023	
13th	R+23	John Joyce (Hollidaysburg)	Republican	since January 3, 2019	
14th	R+17	Guy Reschenthaler (Peters Township)	Republican	since January 3, 2019	
15th	R+19	Glenn Thompson (Howard)	Republican	since January 3, 2009	
16th	R+11	Mike Kelly (Butler)	Republican	since January 3, 2011	
17th	D+3	Chris Deluzio (Aspinwall)	Democratic	since January 3, 2023	

=== 1789–1793: 8 seats ===
For the first two Congresses, Pennsylvania had eight seats. In the First Congress, Representatives were selected at-large on a general ticket. Districts were used in the Second Congress.

Congress	Statewide at-large on a general ticket							
1st (1789–1791)	Thomas; Fitzsimmons (PA)	Frederick; Muhlenberg (PA)	George Clymer (PA)	Daniel Hiester (AA)	Thomas Scott (PA)	Peter; Muhlenberg (AA)	Thomas Hartley (PA)	Henry Wynkoop (PA)
Congress	1st district	2nd district	3rd district	4th district	5th district	6th district	7th district	8th district
2nd (1791–1793)	Thomas; Fitzsimmons (PA)	Frederick; Muhlenberg (AA)	Israel Jacobs (PA)	Daniel Hiester (AA)	John W. Kittera (PA)	Andrew Gregg (AA)	Thomas Hartley (PA)	William Findley (AA)

=== 1793–1803: 13 seats ===
Pennsylvania had thirteen seats. For the third Congress representatives were selected at-large on a general ticket. After that, districts were created.

Congress	Statewide at-large on a general ticket												
3rd (1793–1795)	William; Montgomery (AA)	Frederick; Muhlenberg (AA)	Thomas; Fitzsimons (PA)	Thomas; Scott (PA)	James; Armstrong (PA)	Daniel; Hiester (AA)	John; Smilie (AA)	John W. Kittera (PA)	Thomas; Hartley (PA)	Andrew; Gregg (AA)	Peter; Muhlenberg (AA)	William; Findley (AA)	William; Irvine (AA)
Congress	1st district	2nd district	3rd district	4th district (2 seats)		5th district	6th district	7th district	8th district	9th district	10th district	11th district	12th district
4th (1795–1797)	John; Swanwick (DR)	Frederick; Muhlenberg (DR)	Richard; Thomas (F)	Samuel; Sitgreaves (F)	John; Richards (DR)	Daniel; Hiester (DR)	Samuel; Maclay (DR)	John W. Kittera (F)	Thomas; Hartley (F)	Andrew; Gregg (DR)	David; Bard (DR)	William; Findley (DR)	Albert; Gallatin (DR)
4th (1795–1797)	John; Swanwick (DR)	Frederick; Muhlenberg (DR)	Richard; Thomas (F)	Samuel; Sitgreaves (F)	John; Richards (DR)	George; Ege (F)	Samuel; Maclay (DR)	John W. Kittera (F)	Thomas; Hartley (F)	Andrew; Gregg (DR)	David; Bard (DR)	William; Findley (DR)	Albert; Gallatin (DR)
5th (1797–1799)	John; Swanwick (DR)	Blair; McClenachan (DR)	Richard; Thomas (F)	John; Chapman (F)	Robert; Brown (DR)	George; Ege (F)	John A. Hanna (DR)	John W. Kittera (F)	Thomas; Hartley (F)	Andrew; Gregg (DR)	David; Bard (DR)	William; Findley (DR)	Albert; Gallatin (DR)
5th (1797–1799)	Robert; Waln (F)	Blair; McClenachan (DR)	Richard; Thomas (F)	John; Chapman (F)	Robert; Brown (DR)	Joseph; Hiester (DR)	John A. Hanna (DR)	John W. Kittera (F)	Thomas; Hartley (F)	Andrew; Gregg (DR)	David; Bard (DR)	William; Findley (DR)	Albert; Gallatin (DR)
6th (1799–1801)	Robert; Waln (F)	Michael; Leib (DR)	Richard; Thomas (F)	Peter; Muhlenberg (DR)	Robert; Brown (DR)	Joseph; Hiester (DR)	John A. Hanna (DR)	John W. Kittera (F)	Thomas; Hartley (F)	Andrew; Gregg (DR)	Henry; Woods (F)	John; Smilie (DR)	Albert; Gallatin (DR)
7th (1801–1803)	William; Jones (DR)	Michael; Leib (DR)	Joseph; Hemphill (F)	Isaac Van; Horne (DR)	Robert; Brown (DR)	Joseph; Hiester (DR)	John A. Hanna (DR)	Thomas; Boude (F)	John; Stewart (DR)	Andrew; Gregg (DR)	Henry; Woods (F)	John; Smilie (DR)	William; Hoge (DR)

=== 1803–1813: 18 seats ===
There were eighteen seats, apportioned among eleven districts. Districts 1–3 each had three seats elected on a general ticket. District 4 had two such seats. Districts 5–11 each had one seat.

Congress	District																	
Congress	1st (3 seats)			2nd (3 seats)			3rd (3 seats)			4th (2 seats)		5th	6th	7th	8th	9th	10th	11th
8th (1803–1805)	Joseph; Clay (DR)	Jacob; Richards (DR)	Michael; Leib (DR)	Robert; Brown (DR)	Frederick; Conrad (DR)	Isaac; Van Horne (DR)	Isaac; Anderson (DR)	Joseph; Hiester (DR)	John; Whitehill (DR)	John A. Hanna (DR)	David; Bard (DR)	Andrew; Gregg (DR)	John; Stewart (DR)	John; Rea (DR)	William; Findley (DR)	John; Smilie (DR)	William; Hoge (DR)	Jean B. C. Lucas (DR)
8th (1803–1805)	Joseph; Clay (DR)	Jacob; Richards (DR)	Michael; Leib (DR)	Robert; Brown (DR)	Frederick; Conrad (DR)	Isaac; Van Horne (DR)	Isaac; Anderson (DR)	Joseph; Hiester (DR)	John; Whitehill (DR)	John A. Hanna (DR)	David; Bard (DR)	Andrew; Gregg (DR)	John; Stewart (DR)	John; Rea (DR)	William; Findley (DR)	John; Smilie (DR)	John Hoge (DR)	Jean B. C. Lucas (DR)
9th (1805–1807)	Joseph; Clay (DR)	Jacob; Richards (DR)	Michael; Leib (DR)	Robert; Brown (DR)	Frederick; Conrad (DR)	John; Pugh (DR)	Isaac; Anderson (DR)	Christian; Lower (DR)	John; Whitehill (DR)	John A. Hanna (DR)	David; Bard (DR)	Andrew; Gregg (DR)	James; Kelly (F)	John; Rea (DR)	William; Findley (DR)	John; Smilie (DR)	John; Hamilton (DR)	Samuel; Smith (DR)
9th (1805–1807)	Joseph; Clay (DR)	Jacob; Richards (DR)	John; Porter (DR)	Robert; Brown (DR)	Frederick; Conrad (DR)	John; Pugh (DR)	Isaac; Anderson (DR)	Christian; Lower (DR)	John; Whitehill (DR)	Robert; Whitehill (DR)	David; Bard (DR)	Andrew; Gregg (DR)	James; Kelly (F)	John; Rea (DR)	William; Findley (DR)	John; Smilie (DR)	John; Hamilton (DR)	Samuel; Smith (DR)
10th (1807–1809)	Joseph; Clay (DR)	Jacob; Richards (DR)	John; Porter (DR)	Robert; Brown (DR)	William; Milnor (F)	John; Pugh (DR)	Robert; Jenkins (F)	Matthias; Richards (DR Quid)	John; Hiester (DR Quid)	Robert; Whitehill (DR)	David; Bard (DR Quid)	Daniel; Montgomery (DR)	James; Kelly (F)	John; Rea (DR)	William; Findley (DR)	John; Smilie (DR)	William; Hoge (DR)	Samuel; Smith (DR)
10th (1807–1809)	Benjamin; Say (DR)	Jacob; Richards (DR)	John; Porter (DR)	Robert; Brown (DR)	William; Milnor (F)	John; Pugh (DR)	Robert; Jenkins (F)	Matthias; Richards (DR Quid)	John; Hiester (DR Quid)	Robert; Whitehill (DR)	David; Bard (DR Quid)	Daniel; Montgomery (DR)	James; Kelly (F)	John; Rea (DR)	William; Findley (DR)	John; Smilie (DR)	William; Hoge (DR)	Samuel; Smith (DR)
11th (1809–1811)	Benjamin; Say (DR)	William; Anderson (DR)	John; Porter (DR)	Robert; Brown (DR)	William; Milnor (F)	John; Ross (DR)	Robert; Jenkins (F)	Matthias; Richards (DR)	Daniel; Hiester (DR)	Robert; Whitehill (DR)	David; Bard (DR)	George; Smith (DR)	William; Crawford (DR)	John; Rea (DR)	William; Findley (DR)	John; Smilie (DR)	Aaron; Lyle (DR)	Samuel; Smith (DR)
11th (1809–1811)	Adam; Seybert (DR)	William; Anderson (DR)	John; Porter (DR)	Robert; Brown (DR)	William; Milnor (F)	John; Ross (DR)	Robert; Jenkins (F)	Matthias; Richards (DR)	Daniel; Hiester (DR)	Robert; Whitehill (DR)	David; Bard (DR)	George; Smith (DR)	William; Crawford (DR)	John; Rea (DR)	William; Findley (DR)	John; Smilie (DR)	Aaron; Lyle (DR)	Samuel; Smith (DR)
12th (1811–1813)	Adam; Seybert (DR)	William; Anderson (DR)	James; Milnor (F)	Robert; Brown (DR)	Jonathan; Roberts (DR)	William; Rodman (DR)	Roger; Davis (DR)	John M. Hyneman (DR)	Joseph; Lefever (DR)	Robert; Whitehill (DR)	David; Bard (DR)	George; Smith (DR)	William; Crawford (DR)	William; Piper (DR)	William; Findley (DR)	John; Smilie (DR)	Aaron; Lyle (DR)	Abner; Lacock (DR)
12th (1811–1813)	Adam; Seybert (DR)	William; Anderson (DR)	James; Milnor (F)	Robert; Brown (DR)	Jonathan; Roberts (DR)	William; Rodman (DR)	Roger; Davis (DR)	John M. Hyneman (DR)	Joseph; Lefever (DR)	Robert; Whitehill (DR)	David; Bard (DR)	George; Smith (DR)	William; Crawford (DR)	William; Piper (DR)	William; Findley (DR)	Isaac; Griffin (DR)	Aaron; Lyle (DR)	Abner; Lacock (DR)

=== 1813–1823: 23 seats ===
There were 15 districts. The 1st district had four seats elected on a general ticket. The 2nd, 3rd, 5th, 6th and 10th each had two seats elected on a general ticket. The rest of the districts each had one seat.

Congress
13th
(1813–1815)
14th
(1815–1817)
15th
(1817–1819)
16th
(1819–1821)
17th
(1821–1823)

District																							Congress
1st (4 seats)				2nd (2 seats)		3rd (2 seats)		4th	5th (2 seats)		6th (2 seats)		7th	8th	9th	10th (2 seats)		11th	12th	13th	14th	15th	Congress
Adam; Seybert (DR)	John; Conard (DR)	William; Anderson (DR)	Charles; Jared; Ingersoll (DR)	Jonathan; Roberts (DR)	Roger; Davis (DR)	John; Gloninger (F)	James; Whitehill (DR)	Hugh; Glasgow (DR)	William; Crawford (DR)	Robert; Whitehill (DR)	Samuel D. Ingham (DR)	Robert; Brown (DR)	John M. Hyneman (DR)	William; Piper (DR)	David; Bard (DR)	Jared; Irwin (DR)	Isaac; Smith (DR)	William; Findley (DR)	Aaron; Lyle (DR)	Isaac; Griffin (DR)	Adamson; Tannehill (DR)	Thomas; Wilson (DR)	13th (1813–1815)
Adam; Seybert (DR)	John; Conard (DR)	William; Anderson (DR)	Charles; Jared; Ingersoll (DR)	Samuel; Henderson (F)	Roger; Davis (DR)	Edward; Crouch (DR)	Amos; Slaymaker (F)	Hugh; Glasgow (DR)	William; Crawford (DR)	John; Rea (DR)	Samuel D. Ingham (DR)	Robert; Brown (DR)	Daniel; Udree (DR)	William; Piper (DR)	David; Bard (DR)	Jared; Irwin (DR)	Isaac; Smith (DR)	William; Findley (DR)	Aaron; Lyle (DR)	Isaac; Griffin (DR)	Adamson; Tannehill (DR)	Thomas; Wilson (DR)	13th (1813–1815)
Joseph; Hopkinson (F)	William; Milnor (F)	Thomas; Smith (F)	Jonathan; Williams (DR)	William; Darlington (DR)	John; Hahn (DR)	John; Whiteside (DR)	James M. Wallace (DR)	Hugh; Glasgow (DR)	William; Crawford (DR)	William; Maclay (DR)	Samuel D. Ingham (DR)	John; Ross (DR)	Joseph; Hiester (DR)	William; Piper (DR)	Thomas; Burnside (DR)	Jared; Irwin (DR)	William; Wilson (DR)	William; Findley (DR)	Aaron; Lyle (DR)	Isaac; Griffin (DR)	John; Woods (F)	Thomas; Wilson (DR)	14th (1815–1817)
Joseph; Hopkinson (F)	William; Milnor (F)	Thomas; Smith (F)	John; Sergeant (F)	William; Darlington (DR)	John; Hahn (DR)	John; Whiteside (DR)	James M. Wallace (DR)	Hugh; Glasgow (DR)	William; Crawford (DR)	William; Maclay (DR)	Samuel D. Ingham (DR)	John; Ross (DR)	Joseph; Hiester (DR)	William; Piper (DR)	William; Plunkett; Maclay (DR)	Jared; Irwin (DR)	William; Wilson (DR)	William; Findley (DR)	Aaron; Lyle (DR)	Isaac; Griffin (DR)	John; Woods (F)	Thomas; Wilson (DR)	14th (1815–1817)
Joseph; Hopkinson (F)	Adam; Seybert (DR)	William; Anderson (DR)	John; Sergeant (F)	Isaac; Darlington (F)	Levi; Pawling (F)	John; Whiteside (DR)	James M. Wallace (DR)	Jacob; Spangler (DR)	Andrew; Boden (DR)	William; Maclay (DR)	Samuel D. Ingham (DR)	John; Ross (DR)	Joseph; Hiester (DR)	Alexander; Ogle (DR)	William; Plunkett; Maclay (DR)	David; Scott (DR)	William; Wilson (DR)	David; Marchand (DR)	Thomas; Patterson (DR)	Christian; Tarr (DR)	Henry; Baldwin (DR)	Robert; Moore (DR)	15th (1817–1819)
Joseph; Hopkinson (F)	Adam; Seybert (DR)	William; Anderson (DR)	John; Sergeant (F)	Isaac; Darlington (F)	Levi; Pawling (F)	John; Whiteside (DR)	James M. Wallace (DR)	Jacob; Hostetter (DR)	Andrew; Boden (DR)	William; Maclay (DR)	Samuel; Moore (DR)	Thomas; J. Rogers (DR)	Joseph; Hiester (DR)	Alexander; Ogle (DR)	William; Plunkett; Maclay (DR)	John; Murray (DR)	William; Wilson (DR)	David; Marchand (DR)	Thomas; Patterson (DR)	Christian; Tarr (DR)	Henry; Baldwin (DR)	Robert; Moore (DR)	15th (1817–1819)
Samuel; Edwards (F)	Thomas; Forrest (F)	Joseph; Hemphill (F)	John; Sergeant (F)	William; Darlington (DR)	Samuel; Gross (DR)	Jacob; Hibshman (DR)	James M. Wallace (DR)	Jacob; Hostetter (DR)	Andrew; Boden (DR)	David; Fullerton (DR)	Samuel; Moore (DR)	Thomas; J. Rogers (DR)	Joseph; Hiester (DR)	Robert; Philson (DR)	William; Plunkett; Maclay (DR)	John; Murray (DR)	George; Denison (DR)	David; Marchand (DR)	Thomas; Patterson (DR)	Christian; Tarr (DR)	Henry; Baldwin (DR)	Robert; Moore (DR)	16th (1819–1821)
Samuel; Edwards (F)	Thomas; Forrest (F)	Joseph; Hemphill (F)	John; Sergeant (F)	William; Darlington (DR)	Samuel; Gross (DR)	Jacob; Hibshman (DR)	James M. Wallace (DR)	Jacob; Hostetter (DR)	Andrew; Boden (DR)	Thomas G. McCullough (F)	Samuel; Moore (DR)	Thomas; J. Rogers (DR)	Daniel; Udree (DR)	Robert; Philson (DR)	William; Plunkett; Maclay (DR)	John; Murray (DR)	George; Denison (DR)	David; Marchand (DR)	Thomas; Patterson (DR)	Christian; Tarr (DR)	Henry; Baldwin (DR)	Robert; Moore (DR)	16th (1819–1821)
Samuel; Edwards (F)	William; Milnor (F)	Joseph; Hemphill (F)	John; Sergeant (F)	William; Darlington (DR)	Samuel; Gross (DR)	James; Buchanan (F)	John; Phillips (F)	James S. Mitchell (DR)	James; Duncan (DR)	James; McSherry (F)	Samuel; Moore (DR)	Thomas; J. Rogers (DR)	Ludwig; Worman (F)	John; Tod (DR)	John; Brown (DR)	William Cox; Ellis (DR)	George; Denison (DR)	George; Plumer (DR)	Thomas; Patterson (DR)	Andrew; Stewart (DR)	Henry; Baldwin (DR)	Patrick; Farrelly (DR)	17th (1821–1823)
Samuel; Edwards (F)	Thomas; Forrest (F)	Joseph; Hemphill (F)	John; Sergeant (F)	William; Darlington (DR)	Samuel; Gross (DR)	James; Buchanan (F)	John; Phillips (F)	James S. Mitchell (DR)	John; Findlay (DR)	James; McSherry (F)	Samuel D. Ingham (DR)	Thomas; J. Rogers (DR)	Daniel; Udree (DR)	John; Tod (DR)	John; Brown (DR)	Thomas; Murray Jr. (DR)	George; Denison (DR)	George; Plumer (DR)	Thomas; Patterson (DR)	Andrew; Stewart (DR)	Walter; Forward (DR)	Patrick; Farrelly (DR)	17th (1821–1823)

=== 1823–1833: 26 seats ===
Congress
18th
(1823–1825)
19th
(1825–1827)
20th
(1827–1829)
21st
(1829–1831)
22nd
(1831–1833)

District																										Congress
1st	2nd	3rd	4th (3 seats)			5th	6th	7th (2 seats)		8th (2 seats)		9th (3 seats)			10th	11th (2 seats)		12th	13th	14th	15th	16th (2 seats)		17th	18th	Congress
Samuel; Breck (F) (Note: Supported the Adams faction in the 1824 United States presidential election)	Joseph; Hemphill (F) (Note: Supported the Jackson faction in the 1824 United States presidential election)	Daniel H. Miller (DR)	James; Buchanan (F)	Samuel; Edwards (F)	Isaac; Wayne (F)	Philip S. Markley (DR)	Robert; Harris (DR)	Daniel; Udree (DR)	Henry; Wilson (DR)	Samuel; D. Ingham (DR)	Thomas J. Rogers (DR)	William; Cox; Ellis (F)	George; Kremer (DR)	Samuel; McKean (DR)	James S. Mitchell (DR)	John; Findlay (DR)	James; Wilson (DR)	John; Brown (DR)	John Tod (DR)	Andrew; Stewart (DR)	Thomas; Patterson (DR)	Walter; Forward (DR)	James; Allison Jr. (DR)	George; Plumer (DR)	Patrick; Farrelly (DR)	18th (1823–1825)
Samuel; Breck (F)	Joseph; Hemphill (F)	Daniel H. Miller (DR)	James; Buchanan (F)	Samuel; Edwards (F)	Isaac; Wayne (F)	Philip S. Markley (DR)	Robert; Harris (DR)	Daniel; Udree (DR)	Henry; Wilson (DR)	Samuel; D. Ingham (DR)	George; Wolf (DR)	William; Cox; Ellis (F)	George; Kremer (DR)	Samuel; McKean (DR)	James S. Mitchell (DR)	John; Findlay (DR)	James; Wilson (DR)	John; Brown (DR)	Alexander; Thomson (DR)	Andrew; Stewart (DR)	Thomas; Patterson (DR)	Walter; Forward (DR)	James; Allison Jr. (DR)	George; Plumer (DR)	Patrick; Farrelly (DR)	18th (1823–1825)
John; Wurts (J)	Joseph; Hemphill (J)	Daniel H. Miller (J)	James; Buchanan (J)	Samuel; Edwards (J)	Charles; Miner (J)	Philip S. Markley (NR)	Robert; Harris (J)	William; Addams (J)	Henry; Wilson (J)	Samuel; D. Ingham (J)	George; Wolf (J)	Espy; Van; Horne (J)	George; Kremer (J)	Samuel; McKean (J)	James S. Mitchell (J)	John; Findlay (J)	James; Wilson (NR)	John; Mitchell (J)	Alexander; Thomson (J)	Andrew; Stewart (J)	Joseph; Lawrence (NR)	James S. Stevenson (J)	Robert; Orr Jr. (J)	George; Plumer (J)	Patrick; Farrelly (J)	19th (1825–1827)
John; Wurts (J)	Thomas; Kittera (NR)	Daniel H. Miller (J)	James; Buchanan (J)	Samuel; Edwards (J)	Charles; Miner (J)	Philip S. Markley (NR)	Robert; Harris (J)	William; Addams (J)	Jacob; Krebs (J)	Samuel; D. Ingham (J)	George; Wolf (J)	Espy; Van; Horne (J)	George; Kremer (J)	Samuel; McKean (J)	James S. Mitchell (J)	John; Findlay (J)	James; Wilson (NR)	John; Mitchell (J)	Chauncey; Forward (J)	Andrew; Stewart (J)	Joseph; Lawrence (NR)	James S. Stevenson (J)	Robert; Orr Jr. (J)	George; Plumer (J)	Thomas H. Sill (NR)	19th (1825–1827)
Joel B. Sutherland (J)	John; Sergeant (NR)	Daniel H. Miller (J)	James; Buchanan (J)	Samuel; Anderson (J)	Charles; Miner (J)	John B. Sterigere (J)	Innis; Green (J)	William; Addams (J)	Joseph; Fry Jr. (J)	Samuel; D. Ingham (J)	George; Wolf (J)	Espy; Van; Horne (J)	George; Kremer (J)	Samuel; McKean (J)	Adam; King (J)	William; Ramsey (J)	James; Wilson (J)	John; Mitchell (J)	Chauncey; Forward (J)	Andrew; Stewart (J)	Joseph; Lawrence (NR)	James S. Stevenson (J)	Robert; Orr Jr. (J)	Richard; Coulter (J)	Stephen; Barlow (J)	20th (1827–1829)
Joel B. Sutherland (J)	Joseph; Hemphill (J)	Daniel H. Miller (J)	James; Buchanan (J)	Joshua; Evans Jr. (J)	George G. Leiper (J)	John B. Sterigere (J)	Innis; Green (J)	Henry; A. P. Muhlen- berg (J)	Joseph; Fry Jr. (J)	Samuel; A. Smith (J)	Peter; Ihrie Jr. (J)	James; Ford (J)	Alem; Marr (J)	Philander; Stephens (J)	Adam; King (J)	William; Ramsey (J)	Thomas; Hartley; Crawford (J)	John; Scott (J)	Chauncey; Forward (J)	Thomas; Irwin (J)	William; McCreery (J)	Harmar; Denny (A-M)	John; Gilmore (J)	Richard; Coulter (J)	Thomas H. Sill (NR)	21st (1829–1831)
Joel B. Sutherland (J)	Henry; Horn (J)	John G. Watmough (NR)	William; Hiester; Jr. (A-M)	David; Potts Jr. (A-M)	Joshua; Evans; Jr. (J)	Joel; Keith; Mann (J)	John C. Bucher (J)	Henry; A. P. Muhlen- berg (J)	Henry; King (J)	Samuel; A. Smith (J)	Peter; Ihrie Jr. (J)	James; Ford (J)	Lewis; Dewart (J)	Philander; Stephens (J)	Adam; King (J)	William; Ramsey (J)	Thomas; Hartley; Crawford (J)	Robert; Allison (A-M)	George; Burd (NR)	Andrew; Stewart (A-M)	Thomas; McKennan (A-M)	Harmar; Denny (A-M)	John; Gilmore (J)	Richard; Coulter (J)	John; Banks (A-M)	22nd (1831–1833)
Joel B. Sutherland (J)	Henry; Horn (J)	John G. Watmough (NR)	William; Hiester; Jr. (A-M)	David; Potts Jr. (A-M)	Joshua; Evans; Jr. (J)	Joel; Keith; Mann (J)	John C. Bucher (J)	Henry; A. P. Muhlen- berg (J)	Henry; King (J)	Samuel; A. Smith (J)	Peter; Ihrie Jr. (J)	James; Ford (J)	Lewis; Dewart (J)	Philander; Stephens (J)	Adam; King (J)	Robert; McCoy (J)	Thomas; Hartley; Crawford (J)	Robert; Allison (A-M)	George; Burd (NR)	Andrew; Stewart (A-M)	Thomas; McKennan (A-M)	Harmar; Denny (A-M)	John; Gilmore (J)	Richard; Coulter (J)	John; Banks (A-M)	22nd (1831–1833)

=== 1833–1843: 28 seats ===
Following the 1830 census, Pennsylvania was apportioned 28 seats. The commonwealth divided them into 25 districts and two districts, the 2nd and the 4th, had two and three seats respectively.

Congress
23rd
(1833–1835)
24th
(1835–1837)
25th
(1837–1839)
26th
(1839–1841)
27th
(1841–1843)

District																												Congress
1st	2nd (2 seats)		3rd	4th (3 seats)			5th	6th	7th	8th	9th	10th	11th	12th	13th	14th	15th	16th	17th	18th	19th	20th	21st	22nd	23rd	24th	25th	Congress
Joel B. Sutherland (J)	Horace; Binney (NR)	James; Harper (NR)	John G. Watmough (NR)	David; Potts; Jr. (A-M)	Edward; Darlington (A-M)	William; Hiester (A-M)	Joel Keith; Mann (J)	Robert; Ramsey (J)	David D. Wagener (J)	Henry; King (J)	Henry A. P. Muhlenberg (J)	William; Clark (A-M)	Charles A. Barnitz (A-M)	George; Chambers (A-M)	Jesse; Miller (J)	Joseph; Henderson (J)	Andrew; Beaumont (J)	Joseph B. Anthony (J)	John; Laporte (J)	George; Burd (NR)	Richard; Coulter (J)	Andrew; Stewart (A-M)	Thomas; McKennan (A-M)	Harmar; Denny (A-M)	Samuel; Smith; Harrison (J)	John; Banks (A-M)	John; Galbraith (J)	23rd (1833–1835)
Joel B. Sutherland (J)	Joseph; Reed; Ingersoll (NR)	James; Harper (NR)	Michael; Woolston; Ash (J)	David; Potts; Jr. (A-M)	Edward; Darlington (A-M)	William; Hiester (A-M)	Jacob; Fry Jr. (J)	Mathias; Morris (NR)	David D. Wagener (J)	Edward Burd; Hubley (J)	Henry A. P. Muhlenberg (J)	William; Clark (A-M)	Henry; Logan (J)	George; Chambers (A-M)	Jesse; Miller (J)	Joseph; Henderson (J)	Andrew; Beaumont (J)	Joseph B. Anthony (J)	John; Laporte (J)	Job; Mann (J)	John; Klingensmith; Jr. (J)	Andrew; Buchanan (J)	Thomas; McKennan (A-M)	Harmar; Denny (A-M)	Samuel; Smith; Harrison (J)	John; Banks (A-M)	John; Galbraith (J)	24th (1835–1837)
Joel B. Sutherland (J)	Joseph; Reed; Ingersoll (NR)	James; Harper (NR)	Michael; Woolston; Ash (J)	David; Potts; Jr. (A-M)	Edward; Darlington (A-M)	William; Hiester (A-M)	Jacob; Fry Jr. (J)	Mathias; Morris (NR)	David D. Wagener (J)	Edward Burd; Hubley (J)	Henry A. P. Muhlenberg (J)	William; Clark (A-M)	Henry; Logan (J)	George; Chambers (A-M)	James; Black (J)	Joseph; Henderson (J)	Andrew; Beaumont (J)	Joseph B. Anthony (J)	John; Laporte (J)	Job; Mann (J)	John; Klingensmith; Jr. (J)	Andrew; Buchanan (J)	Thomas; McKennan (A-M)	Harmar; Denny (A-M)	Samuel; Smith; Harrison (J)	John James; Pearson (NR)	John; Galbraith (J)	24th (1835–1837)
Lemuel; Paynter (D)	John; Sergeant (W)	George; W. Toland (W)	Francis J. Harper (D)	David; Potts; Jr. (A-M)	Edward; Darlington (A-M)	Edward; Davies (A-M)	Jacob; Fry Jr. (D)	Mathias; Morris (W)	David D. Wagener (D)	Edward; Burd; Hubley (D)	Henry A. P. Muhlenberg (D)	Luther; Reily (D)	Henry; Logan (D)	Daniel; Sheffer (D)	Charles; McClure (D)	William; Wilson; Potter (D)	David; Petrikin (D)	Robert H. Hammond (D)	Samuel; W. Morris (D)	Charles; Ogle (A-M)	John; Klingensmith; Jr. (D)	Andrew; Buchanan (D)	Thomas; McKennan (A-M)	Richard; Biddle (A-M)	William; Beatty (D)	Thomas; Henry (A-M)	Arnold; Plumer (D)	25th (1837–1839)
Lemuel; Paynter (D)	John; Sergeant (W)	George; W. Toland (W)	Charles; Naylor (W)	David; Potts; Jr. (A-M)	Edward; Darlington (A-M)	Edward; Davies (A-M)	Jacob; Fry Jr. (D)	Mathias; Morris (W)	David D. Wagener (D)	Edward; Burd; Hubley (D)	George M. Keim (D)	Luther; Reily (D)	Henry; Logan (D)	Daniel; Sheffer (D)	Charles; McClure (D)	William; Wilson; Potter (D)	David; Petrikin (D)	Robert H. Hammond (D)	Samuel; W. Morris (D)	Charles; Ogle (A-M)	John; Klingensmith; Jr. (D)	Andrew; Buchanan (D)	Thomas; McKennan (A-M)	Richard; Biddle (A-M)	William; Beatty (D)	Thomas; Henry (A-M)	Arnold; Plumer (D)	25th (1837–1839)
Lemuel; Paynter (D)	John; Sergeant (W)	George; W. Toland (W)	Charles; Naylor (W)	Francis; James (A-M)	John; Edwards (A-M)	Edward; Davies (A-M)	Joseph; Fornance (D)	John; Davis (D)	David D. Wagener (D)	Peter; Newhard (D)	George M. Keim (D)	William; Simonton (W)	James Gerry (D)	James; Cooper (W)	William S. Ramsey (D)	George; McCulloch (D)	David; Petrikin (D)	Robert H. Hammond (D)	Samuel; W. Morris (D)	Charles; Ogle (A-M)	Albert; Gallatin; Marchand (D)	Enos; Hook (D)	Isaac Leet (D)	Richard; Biddle (A-M)	William; Beatty (D)	Thomas; Henry (A-M)	John; Galbraith (D)	26th (1839–1841)
Lemuel; Paynter (D)	John; Sergeant (W)	George; W. Toland (W)	Charles; Naylor (W)	Francis; James (A-M)	John; Edwards (A-M)	Edward; Davies (A-M)	Joseph; Fornance (D)	John; Davis (D)	David D. Wagener (D)	Peter; Newhard (D)	George M. Keim (D)	William; Simonton (W)	James Gerry (D)	James; Cooper (W)	William S. Ramsey (D)	George; McCulloch (D)	David; Petrikin (D)	Robert H. Hammond (D)	Samuel; W. Morris (D)	Charles; Ogle (A-M)	Albert; Gallatin; Marchand (D)	Enos; Hook (D)	Isaac Leet (D)	Henry M. Brackenridge (W)	William; Beatty (D)	Thomas; Henry (A-M)	John; Galbraith (D)	26th (1839–1841)
Charles; Brown (D)	Joseph; Reed; Ingersoll (W)	George; W. Toland (W)	Charles; Jared; Ingersoll (D)	Jeremiah; Brown (W)	John; Edwards (W)	Francis; James (W)	Joseph; Fornance (D)	Robert; Ramsey (W)	John; Westbrook (D)	Peter; Newhard (D)	George M. Keim (D)	William; Simonton (W)	James Gerry (D)	James; Cooper (W)	Amos; Gustine (D)	James; Irvin (W)	Benjamin; A. Bidlack (D)	John; Snyder (D)	Davis Di- mock Jr. (D)	Henry; Black (W)	Albert; Gallatin; Marchand (D)	Henry; White; Beeson (D)	Joseph; Lawrence (W)	William W. Irwin (W)	William; Jack (D)	Thomas; Henry (W)	Arnold; Plumer (D)	27th (1841–1843)
Charles; Brown (D)	Joseph; Reed; Ingersoll (W)	George; W. Toland (W)	Charles; Jared; Ingersoll (D)	Jeremiah; Brown (W)	John; Edwards (W)	Francis; James (W)	Joseph; Fornance (D)	Robert; Ramsey (W)	John; Westbrook (D)	Peter; Newhard (D)	George M. Keim (D)	William; Simonton (W)	James Gerry (D)	James; Cooper (W)	Amos; Gustine (D)	James; Irvin (W)	Benjamin; A. Bidlack (D)	John; Snyder (D)	Almon H. Read (D)	James M. Russell (W)	Albert; Gallatin; Marchand (D)	Henry; White; Beeson (D)	Thomas; McKennan (W)	William W. Irwin (W)	William; Jack (D)	Thomas; Henry (W)	Arnold; Plumer (D)	27th (1841–1843)

=== 1843–1853: 24 seats ===
Congress
28th
(1843–1845)
29th
(1845–1847)
30th
(1847–1849)
31st
(1849–1851)
32nd
(1851–1853)

District																								Congress
1st	2nd	3rd	4th	5th	6th	7th	8th	9th	10th	11th	12th	13th	14th	15th	16th	17th	18th	19th	20th	21st	22nd	23rd	24th	Congress
Edward; Joy; Morris (W)	Joseph; Reed; Ingersoll (W)	John T. Smith (D)	Charles; Jared; Ingersoll (D)	Jacob; Senewell; Yost (D)	Michael; Hutchinson; Jenks (W)	Abraham; Robinson; McIlvaine (W)	Jeremiah; Brown (W)	John; Ritter (D)	Richard; Brodhead (D)	Benjamin; A. Bidlack (D)	Almon H. Read (D)	Henry; Frick (W)	Alexander; Ramsey (W)	Henry; Nes (ID)	James; Black (D)	James; Irvin (W)	Andrew; Stewart (W)	Henry; Donnel; Foster (D)	John; Dickey (W)	William; Wilkins (D)	Samuel; Hays (D)	Charles; Manning; Reed (W)	Joseph; Buffington (W)	28th (1843–1845)
Edward; Joy; Morris (W)	Joseph; Reed; Ingersoll (W)	John T. Smith (D)	Charles; Jared; Ingersoll (D)	Jacob; Senewell; Yost (D)	Michael; Hutchinson; Jenks (W)	Abraham; Robinson; McIlvaine (W)	Jeremiah; Brown (W)	John; Ritter (D)	Richard; Brodhead (D)	Benjamin; A. Bidlack (D)	George; Fuller (D)	James; Pollock (W)	Alexander; Ramsey (W)	Henry; Nes (ID)	James; Black (D)	James; Irvin (W)	Andrew; Stewart (W)	Henry; Donnel; Foster (D)	John; Dickey (W)	Cornelius; Darragh (W)	Samuel; Hays (D)	Charles; Manning; Reed (W)	Joseph; Buffington (W)	28th (1843–1845)
Lewis; Charles; Levin (KN)	Joseph; Reed; Ingersoll (W)	John Hull; Campbell (KN)	Charles; Jared; Ingersoll (D)	Jacob; Senewell; Yost (D)	Jacob; Erdman (D)	Abraham; Robinson; McIlvaine (W)	John; Strohm (W)	John; Ritter (D)	Richard; Brodhead (D)	Owen D. Leib (D)	David; Wilmot (D)	James; Pollock (W)	Alexander; Ramsey (W)	Moses; McClean (D)	James; Black (D)	John; Blanchard (W)	Andrew; Stewart (W)	Henry; Donnel; Foster (D)	John Hoge; Ewing (W)	Cornelius; Darragh (W)	William Swan; Garvin (D)	James; Thompson (D)	Joseph; Buffington (W)	29th (1845–1847)
Lewis; Charles; Levin (KN)	Joseph; Reed; Ingersoll (W)	Charles; Brown (D)	Charles; Jared; Ingersoll (D)	John; Freedley (W)	John W. Hornbeck (W)	Abraham; Robinson; McIlvaine (W)	John; Strohm (W)	William; Strong (D)	Richard; Brodhead (D)	Chester; P. Butler (W)	David; Wilmot (D)	James; Pollock (W)	George; Nicholas; Eckert (W)	Henry; Nes (W)	Jasper; Ewing; Brady (W)	John; Blanchard (W)	Andrew; Stewart (W)	Job; Mann (D)	John; Dickey (W)	Moses; Hampton (W)	John W. Farrelly (W)	James; Thompson (D)	Alexander; Irvin (W)	30th (1847–1849)
Lewis; Charles; Levin (KN)	Joseph; Reed; Ingersoll (W)	Charles; Brown (D)	Charles; Jared; Ingersoll (D)	John; Freedley (W)	Samuel A. Bridges (D)	Abraham; Robinson; McIlvaine (W)	John; Strohm (W)	William; Strong (D)	Richard; Brodhead (D)	Chester; P. Butler (W)	David; Wilmot (D)	James; Pollock (W)	George; Nicholas; Eckert (W)	Henry; Nes (W)	Jasper; Ewing; Brady (W)	John; Blanchard (W)	Andrew; Stewart (W)	Job; Mann (D)	John; Dickey (W)	Moses; Hampton (W)	John W. Farrelly (W)	James; Thompson (D)	Alexander; Irvin (W)	30th (1847–1849)
Lewis; Charles; Levin (KN)	Joseph; R. Chandler (W)	Henry D. Moore (W)	John; Robbins (D)	John; Freedley (W)	Thomas; Ross (D)	Jesse C. Dickey (W)	Thaddeus; Stevens (W)	William; Strong (D)	Milo M. Dimmick (D)	Chester; P. Butler (W)	David; Wilmot (D)	Joseph; Casey (W)	Charles W. Pitman (W)	Henry; Nes (W)	James X. McLanahan (D)	Samuel; Calvin (W)	Andrew J. Ogle (W)	Job; Mann (D)	Robert R. Reed (W)	Moses; Hampton (W)	John W. Howe (FS)	James; Thompson (D)	Alfred; Gilmore (D)	31st (1849–1851)
Lewis; Charles; Levin (KN)	Joseph; R. Chandler (W)	Henry D. Moore (W)	John; Robbins (D)	John; Freedley (W)	Thomas; Ross (D)	Jesse C. Dickey (W)	Thaddeus; Stevens (W)	William; Strong (D)	Milo M. Dimmick (D)	John; Brisbin (D)	David; Wilmot (D)	Joseph; Casey (W)	Charles W. Pitman (W)	Joel B. Danner (D)	James X. McLanahan (D)	Samuel; Calvin (W)	Andrew J. Ogle (W)	Job; Mann (D)	Robert R. Reed (W)	Moses; Hampton (W)	John W. Howe (FS)	James; Thompson (D)	Alfred; Gilmore (D)	31st (1849–1851)
Thomas B. Florence (D)	Joseph; R. Chandler (W)	Henry D. Moore (W)	John; Robbins (D)	John; McNair (D)	Thomas; Ross (D)	John A. Morrison (D)	Thaddeus; Stevens (W)	J. Glancy; Jones (D)	Milo M. Dimmick (D)	Henry Mills; Fuller (W)	Galusha A. Grow (D)	James; Gamble (D)	Thomas M. Bibighaus (W)	William H. Kurtz (D)	James X. McLanahan (D)	Andrew; Parker (D)	John L. Dawson (D)	Joseph H. Kuhns (W)	John; Allison (W)	Thomas M. Howe (W)	John W. Howe (W)	Carlton B. Curtis (D)	Alfred; Gilmore (D)	32nd (1851–1853)

=== 1853–1863: 25 seats ===
Congress
33rd
(1853–1855)
34th
(1855–1857)
35th
(1857–1859)
36th
(1859–1861)
37th
(1861–1863)

District																									Congress
1st	2nd	3rd	4th	5th	6th	7th	8th	9th	10th	11th	12th	13th	14th	15th	16th	17th	18th	19th	20th	21st	22nd	23rd	24th	25th	Congress
Thomas; B. Florence (D)	Joseph R. Chandler (W)	John; Robbins (D)	William H. Witte (D)	John; McNair (D)	William; Everhart (W)	Samuel; A. Bridges (D)	Henry A. Muhlenberg (D)	Isaac E. Hiester (W)	Ner; Middleswarth (W)	Christian; M. Straub (D)	Hendrick B. Wright (D)	Asa; Packer (D)	Galusha; A. Grow (D)	James; Gamble (D)	Carlton; B. Curtis (D)	Samuel L. Russell (W)	John; McCulloch (W)	Augustus; Drum (D)	John L. Dawson (D)	David; Ritchie (W)	Thomas; Marshall; Howe (W)	Michael; C. Trout (D)	John; Dick (W)	William; H. Kurtz (D)	33rd (1853–1855)
Thomas; B. Florence (D)	Joseph R. Chandler (W)	John; Robbins (D)	William H. Witte (D)	John; McNair (D)	William; Everhart (W)	Samuel; A. Bridges (D)	J. Glancy; Jones (D)	Isaac E. Hiester (W)	Ner; Middleswarth (W)	Christian; M. Straub (D)	Hendrick B. Wright (D)	Asa; Packer (D)	Galusha; A. Grow (D)	James; Gamble (D)	Carlton; B. Curtis (D)	Samuel L. Russell (W)	John; McCulloch (W)	Augustus; Drum (D)	John L. Dawson (D)	David; Ritchie (W)	Thomas; Marshall; Howe (W)	Michael; C. Trout (D)	John; Dick (W)	William; H. Kurtz (D)	33rd (1853–1855)
Thomas; B. Florence (D)	Job Roberts; Tyson (W)	William; Millward (O)	Jacob; Broom (KN)	John Cad- walader (D)	John; Hickman (D)	Samuel C. Bradshaw (O)	J. Glancy; Jones (D)	Anthony E. Roberts (O)	John C. Kunkel (W)	James H. Campbell (O)	Henry Mills; Fuller (O)	Asa; Packer (D)	Galusha; A. Grow (D)	John J. Pearce (O)	Lemuel; Todd (O)	David F. Robison (O)	John Rufus; Edie (O)	John; Covode (O)	Jonathan; Knight (O)	David; Ritchie (O)	Samuel A. Purviance (O)	John; Allison (O)	David; Barclay (D)	John; Dick (O)	34th (1855–1857)
Thomas; B. Florence (D)	Edward; Joy; Morris (R)	James; Landy (D)	Henry M. Phillips (D)	Owen; Jones (D)	John; Hickman (D)	Henry; Chapman (D)	J. Glancy; Jones (D)	Anthony; E. Roberts (R)	John C. Kunkel (R)	William; Lewis; Dewart (D)	John G. Montgomery (D)	William; H. Dimmick (D)	Galusha; A. Grow (R)	Allison; White (D)	John; Alexander; Ahl (D)	Wilson; Reilly (D)	John; Rufus; Edie (R)	John; Covode (R)	William; Montgomery (D)	David; Ritchie (R)	Samuel A. Purviance (R)	William; Stewart (R)	James; Lisle; Gillis (D)	John; Dick (R)	35th (1857–1859)
Thomas; B. Florence (D)	Edward; Joy; Morris (R)	James; Landy (D)	Henry M. Phillips (D)	Owen; Jones (D)	John; Hickman (D)	Henry; Chapman (D)	William H. Keim (R)	Anthony; E. Roberts (R)	John C. Kunkel (R)	William; Lewis; Dewart (D)	Paul Leidy (D)	William; H. Dimmick (D)	Galusha; A. Grow (R)	Allison; White (D)	John; Alexander; Ahl (D)	Wilson; Reilly (D)	John; Rufus; Edie (R)	John; Covode (R)	William; Montgomery (D)	David; Ritchie (R)	Samuel A. Purviance (R)	William; Stewart (R)	James; Lisle; Gillis (D)	John; Dick (R)	35th (1857–1859)
Thomas; B. Florence (D)	Edward; Joy; Morris (R)	John; Paul; Verree (R)	William; Millward (R)	John; Wood (R)	John; Hickman (D)	Henry Clay; Longnecker (R)	J. Schwartz (D)	Thaddeus; Stevens (R)	John W. Killinger (R)	James H. Campbell (R)	George W. Scranton (R)	William; H. Dimmick (D)	Galusha; A. Grow (R)	James; Tracy; Hale (R)	Benjamin; Franklin; Junkin (R)	Edward; McPherson (R)	Samuel; Steel; Blair (R)	John; Covode (R)	William; Montgomery (D)	James K. Moorhead (R)	Robert; McKnight (R)	William; Stewart (R)	Chapin; Hall (R)	Elijah; Babbitt (R)	36th (1859–1861)
Thomas; B. Florence (D)	Edward; Joy; Morris (R)	John; Paul; Verree (R)	William; Millward (R)	John; Wood (R)	John; Hickman (D)	Henry Clay; Longnecker (R)	Jacob Kerlin; McKenty (D)	Thaddeus; Stevens (R)	John W. Killinger (R)	James H. Campbell (R)	George W. Scranton (R)	William; H. Dimmick (D)	Galusha; A. Grow (R)	James; Tracy; Hale (R)	Benjamin; Franklin; Junkin (R)	Edward; McPherson (R)	Samuel; Steel; Blair (R)	John; Covode (R)	William; Montgomery (D)	James K. Moorhead (R)	Robert; McKnight (R)	William; Stewart (R)	Chapin; Hall (R)	Elijah; Babbitt (R)	36th (1859–1861)
William; Eckart; Lehman (D)	Edward; Joy; Morris (R)	John; Paul; Verree (R)	William D. Kelley (R)	William; Morris; Davis (R)	John; Hickman (R)	Thomas B. Cooper (D)	Sydenham; E. Ancona (D)	Thaddeus; Stevens (R)	John W. Killinger (R)	James H. Campbell (R)	George W. Scranton (R)	Philip; Johnson (D)	Galusha; A. Grow (R)	James; Tracy; Hale (R)	Joseph; Bailey (D)	Edward; McPherson (R)	Samuel; Steel; Blair (R)	John; Covode (R)	Jesse; Lazear (D)	James K. Moorhead (R)	Robert; McKnight (R)	John; Winfield; Wallace (R)	John; Patton (R)	Elijah; Babbitt (R)	37th (1861–1863)
William; Eckart; Lehman (D)	Charles J. Biddle (D)	John; Paul; Verree (R)	William D. Kelley (R)	William; Morris; Davis (R)	John; Hickman (R)	John D. Stiles (D)	Sydenham; E. Ancona (D)	Thaddeus; Stevens (R)	John W. Killinger (R)	James H. Campbell (R)	Hendrick B. Wright (D)	Philip; Johnson (D)	Galusha; A. Grow (R)	James; Tracy; Hale (R)	Joseph; Bailey (D)	Edward; McPherson (R)	Samuel; Steel; Blair (R)	John; Covode (R)	Jesse; Lazear (D)	James K. Moorhead (R)	Robert; McKnight (R)	John; Winfield; Wallace (R)	John; Patton (R)	Elijah; Babbitt (R)	37th (1861–1863)

=== 1863–1873: 24 seats ===
Congress
38th
(1863–1865)
39th
(1865–1867)
40th
(1867–1869)
41st
(1869–1871)
42nd
(1871–1873)

District																								Congress
1st	2nd	3rd	4th	5th	6th	7th	8th	9th	10th	11th	12th	13th	14th	15th	16th	17th	18th	19th	20th	21st	22nd	23rd	24th	Congress
Samuel; J. Randall (D)	Charles; O'Neill (R)	Leonard; Myers (R)	William; D. Kelley (R)	Martin; Russell; Thayer (R)	John D. Stiles (D)	John M. Broomall (R)	Sydenham; E. Ancona (D)	Thaddeus; Stevens (R)	Myer; Strouse (D)	Philip; Johnson (D)	Charles; Denison (D)	Henry W. Tracy (IR)	William H. Miller (D)	Joseph; Bailey (D)	Alexander; H. Coffroth (D)	Archibald; McAllister (D)	James T. Hale (IR)	Glenni; W. Scofield (R)	Amos; Myers (R)	John; L. Dawson (D)	James K. Moorhead (R)	Thomas; Williams (R)	Jesse; Lazear (D)	38th (1863–1865)
Samuel; J. Randall (D)	Charles; O'Neill (R)	Leonard; Myers (R)	William; D. Kelley (R)	Martin; Russell; Thayer (R)	Benjamin; Markley; Boyer (D)	John M. Broomall (R)	Sydenham; E. Ancona (D)	Thaddeus; Stevens (R)	Myer; Strouse (D)	Philip; Johnson (D)	Charles; Denison (D)	Ulysses; Mercur (R)	George; Funston; Miller (R)	Adam; John; Gloss- brenner (D)	Alexander; H. Coffroth (D)	Abraham A. Barker (R)	Stephen; F. Wilson (R)	Glenni; W. Scofield (R)	Charles V. Culver (R)	John; L. Dawson (D)	James K. Moorhead (R)	Thomas; Williams (R)	George V. Lawrence (R)	39th (1865–1867)
Samuel; J. Randall (D)	Charles; O'Neill (R)	Leonard; Myers (R)	William; D. Kelley (R)	Martin; Russell; Thayer (R)	Benjamin; Markley; Boyer (D)	John M. Broomall (R)	Sydenham; E. Ancona (D)	Thaddeus; Stevens (R)	Myer; Strouse (D)	Philip; Johnson (D)	Charles; Denison (D)	Ulysses; Mercur (R)	George; Funston; Miller (R)	Adam; John; Gloss- brenner (D)	William; H. Koontz (R)	Abraham A. Barker (R)	Stephen; F. Wilson (R)	Glenni; W. Scofield (R)	Charles V. Culver (R)	John; L. Dawson (D)	James K. Moorhead (R)	Thomas; Williams (R)	George V. Lawrence (R)	39th (1865–1867)
Samuel; J. Randall (D)	Charles; O'Neill (R)	Leonard; Myers (R)	William; D. Kelley (R)	Caleb N. Taylor (R)	Benjamin; Markley; Boyer (D)	John M. Broomall (R)	James; Lawrence; Getz (D)	Thaddeus; Stevens (R)	Henry L. Cake (R)	Daniel; Myers; Van; Auken (D)	Charles; Denison (D)	Ulysses; Mercur (R)	George; Funston; Miller (R)	Adam; John; Gloss- brenner (D)	William; H. Koontz (R)	Daniel J. Morrell (R)	Stephen; F. Wilson (R)	Glenni; W. Scofield (R)	Darwin A. Finney (R)	John; Covode (R)	James K. Moorhead (R)	Thomas; Williams (R)	George V. Lawrence (R)	40th (1867–1869)
Samuel; J. Randall (D)	Charles; O'Neill (R)	Leonard; Myers (R)	William; D. Kelley (R)	Caleb N. Taylor (R)	Benjamin; Markley; Boyer (D)	John M. Broomall (R)	James; Lawrence; Getz (D)	Oliver; James; Dickey (R)	Henry L. Cake (R)	Daniel; Myers; Van; Auken (D)	George W. Woodward (D)	Ulysses; Mercur (R)	George; Funston; Miller (R)	Adam; John; Gloss- brenner (D)	William; H. Koontz (R)	Daniel J. Morrell (R)	Stephen; F. Wilson (R)	Glenni; W. Scofield (R)	S. Newton; Pettis (R)	John; Covode (R)	James K. Moorhead (R)	Thomas; Williams (R)	George V. Lawrence (R)	40th (1867–1869)
Samuel; J. Randall (D)	Charles; O'Neill (R)	John; Moffet (D)	William; D. Kelley (R)	John R. Reading (D)	John D. Stiles (D)	Washington; Townsend (R)	James; Lawrence; Getz (D)	Oliver; James; Dickey (R)	Henry L. Cake (R)	Daniel; Myers; Van; Auken (D)	George W. Woodward (D)	Ulysses; Mercur (R)	John B. Packer (R)	Richard; Jacobs; Haldeman (D)	John; Cessna (R)	Daniel J. Morrell (R)	William H. Armstrong (R)	Glenni; W. Scofield (R)	Calvin W. Gilfillan (R)	John; Covode (R)	James S. Negley (R)	Darwin; Phelps (R)	Joseph; Benton; Donley (R)	41st (1869–1871)
Samuel; J. Randall (D)	Charles; O'Neill (R)	Leonard; Myers (R)	William; D. Kelley (R)	Caleb N. Taylor (R)	John D. Stiles (D)	Washington; Townsend (R)	James; Lawrence; Getz (D)	Oliver; James; Dickey (R)	Henry L. Cake (R)	Daniel; Myers; Van; Auken (D)	George W. Woodward (D)	Ulysses; Mercur (R)	John B. Packer (R)	Richard; Jacobs; Haldeman (D)	John; Cessna (R)	Daniel J. Morrell (R)	William H. Armstrong (R)	Glenni; W. Scofield (R)	Calvin W. Gilfillan (R)	John; Covode (R)	James S. Negley (R)	Darwin; Phelps (R)	Joseph; Benton; Donley (R)	41st (1869–1871)
Samuel; J. Randall (D)	John V. Creely (IR)	Leonard; Myers (R)	William; D. Kelley (R)	Alfred C. Harmer (R)	Ephraim; Acker (D)	Washington; Townsend (R)	James; Lawrence; Getz (D)	Oliver; James; Dickey (R)	John W. Killinger (R)	John B. Storm (D)	Lazarus D. Shoemaker (R)	Ulysses; Mercur (R)	John B. Packer (R)	Richard; Jacobs; Haldeman (D)	Benjamin F. Meyers (D)	R. Milton; Speer (D)	Henry; Sherwood (D)	Glenni; W. Scofield (R)	Samuel; Griffith (D)	Henry D. Foster (D)	James S. Negley (R)	Ebenezer; McJunkin (R)	William; McClelland (D)	42nd (1871–1873)
Samuel; J. Randall (D)	John V. Creely (IR)	Leonard; Myers (R)	William; D. Kelley (R)	Alfred C. Harmer (R)	Ephraim; Acker (D)	Washington; Townsend (R)	James; Lawrence; Getz (D)	Oliver; James; Dickey (R)	John W. Killinger (R)	John B. Storm (D)	Lazarus D. Shoemaker (R)	F. C. Bunnell (R)	John B. Packer (R)	Richard; Jacobs; Haldeman (D)	Benjamin F. Meyers (D)	R. Milton; Speer (D)	Henry; Sherwood (D)	Glenni; W. Scofield (R)	Samuel; Griffith (D)	Henry D. Foster (D)	James S. Negley (R)	Ebenezer; McJunkin (R)	William; McClelland (D)	42nd (1871–1873)

=== 1873–1883: 27 seats ===
Congress
43rd
(1873–1875)
44th
(1875–1877)
45th
(1877–1879)
46th
(1879–1881)
47th
(1881–1883)

District																								At-large			Congress
1st	2nd	3rd	4th	5th	6th	7th	8th	9th	10th	11th	12th	13th	14th	15th	16th	17th	18th	19th	20th	21st	22nd	23rd	24th	3 seats on a general ticket			Congress
Samuel J. Randall (D)	Charles; O'Neill (R)	Leonard; Myers (R)	William; D. Kelley (R)	Alfred C. Harmer (R)	James S. Biery (R)	Washington; Townsend (R)	Hiester; Clymer (D)	A. Herr; Smith (R)	John W. Killinger (R)	John B. Storm (D)	Lazarus D. Shoemaker (R)	James; Dale; Strawbridge (R)	John; B. Packer (R)	John; A. Magee (D)	John; Cessna (R)	R. Milton; Speer (D)	Sobieski; Ross (R)	Carlton; B. Curtis (R)	Hiram L. Richmond (R)	Alexander; W. Taylor (R)	James S. Negley (R)	Ebenezer; McJunkin (R)	William S. Moore (R)	Charles; Albright (R)	Glenni W. Scofield (R)	Lemuel; Todd (R)	43rd (1873–1875)
Samuel J. Randall (D)	Charles; O'Neill (R)	Leonard; Myers (R)	William; D. Kelley (R)	Alfred C. Harmer (R)	James S. Biery (R)	Washington; Townsend (R)	Hiester; Clymer (D)	A. Herr; Smith (R)	John W. Killinger (R)	John B. Storm (D)	Lazarus D. Shoemaker (R)	James; Dale; Strawbridge (R)	John; B. Packer (R)	John; A. Magee (D)	John; Cessna (R)	R. Milton; Speer (D)	Sobieski; Ross (R)	Carlton; B. Curtis (R)	Hiram L. Richmond (R)	Alexander; W. Taylor (R)	James S. Negley (R)	John M. Thompson (R)	William S. Moore (R)	Charles; Albright (R)	Glenni W. Scofield (R)	Lemuel; Todd (R)	43rd (1873–1875)
Samuel J. Randall (D)	Charles; O'Neill (R)	Leonard; Myers (R)	William; D. Kelley (R)	Alfred C. Harmer (R)	James S. Biery (R)	Washington; Townsend (R)	Hiester; Clymer (D)	A. Herr; Smith (R)	John W. Killinger (R)	John B. Storm (D)	Lazarus D. Shoemaker (R)	James; Dale; Strawbridge (R)	John; B. Packer (R)	John; A. Magee (D)	John; Cessna (R)	R. Milton; Speer (D)	Sobieski; Ross (R)	Carlton; B. Curtis (R)	Hiram L. Richmond (R)	Alexander; W. Taylor (R)	James S. Negley (R)	John M. Thompson (R)	William S. Moore (R)	25th	26th	27th	43rd (1873–1875)
Chapman; Freeman (R)	Charles; O'Neill (R)	Samuel; J. Randall (D)	William; D. Kelley (R)	John; Robbins (D)	Washington; Townsend (R)	Alan; Wood; Jr. (R)	Hiester; Clymer (D)	A. Herr; Smith (R)	William; Mutchler (D)	Francis; D. Collins (D)	Winthrop W. Ketcham (R)	James B. Reilly (D)	John; B. Packer (R)	Joseph; Powell (D)	Sobieski; Ross (R)	John; Reilly (D)	William; Stenger (D)	Levi; Maish (D)	Levi A. Mackey (D)	Jacob; Turney (D)	James H. Hopkins (D)	Alexander; G. Cochran (D)	John; Winfield; Wallace (R)	George A. Jenks (D)	James; Sheakley (D)	Albert; Gallatin; Egbert (D)	44th (1875–1877)
Chapman; Freeman (R)	Charles; O'Neill (R)	Samuel; J. Randall (D)	William; D. Kelley (R)	John; Robbins (D)	Washington; Townsend (R)	Alan; Wood; Jr. (R)	Hiester; Clymer (D)	A. Herr; Smith (R)	William; Mutchler (D)	Francis; D. Collins (D)	William H. Stanton (D)	James B. Reilly (D)	John; B. Packer (R)	Joseph; Powell (D)	Sobieski; Ross (R)	John; Reilly (D)	William; Stenger (D)	Levi; Maish (D)	Levi A. Mackey (D)	Jacob; Turney (D)	James H. Hopkins (D)	Alexander; G. Cochran (D)	John; Winfield; Wallace (R)	George A. Jenks (D)	James; Sheakley (D)	Albert; Gallatin; Egbert (D)	44th (1875–1877)
Chapman; Freeman (R)	Charles; O'Neill (R)	Samuel; J. Randall (D)	William; D. Kelley (R)	Alfred C. Harmer (R)	William; Ward (R)	Isaac N. Evans (R)	Hiester; Clymer (D)	A. Herr; Smith (R)	Samuel A. Bridges (D)	Francis; D. Collins (D)	Hendrick B. Wright (D)	James B. Reilly (D)	John W. Killinger (R)	Edward; Overton; Jr. (R)	John I. Mitchell (R)	Jacob M. Campbell (R)	William; Stenger (D)	Levi; Maish (D)	Levi A. Mackey (D)	Jacob; Turney (D)	Russell; Errett (R)	Thomas; M. Bayne (R)	William; S. Shallen- berger (R)	Harry; White (R)	John M. Thompson (R)	Lewis F. Watson (R)	45th (1877–1879)
Henry H. Bingham (R)	Charles; O'Neill (R)	Samuel; J. Randall (D)	William; D. Kelley (R)	Alfred C. Harmer (R)	William; Ward (R)	William; Godshalk (R)	Hiester; Clymer (D)	A. Herr; Smith (R)	Reuben K. Bachman (D)	Robert; Klotz (D)	Hendrick B. Wright (GB)	John W. Ryon (D)	John W. Killinger (R)	Edward; Overton; Jr. (R)	John I. Mitchell (R)	Alexander H. Coffroth (D)	Horatio; G. Fisher (R)	Frank E. Beltz- hoover (D)	Seth H. Yocum (GB)	Morgan; R. Wise (D)	Russell; Errett (R)	Thomas; M. Bayne (R)	William; S. Shallen- berger (R)	Harry; White (R)	Samuel B. Dick (R)	James H. Osmer (R)	46th (1879–1881)
Henry H. Bingham (R)	Charles; O'Neill (R)	Samuel; J. Randall (D)	William; D. Kelley (R)	Alfred C. Harmer (R)	William; Ward (R)	William; Godshalk (R)	Daniel; Ermentrout (D)	A. Herr; Smith (R)	William; Mutchler (D)	Robert; Klotz (D)	Joseph A. Scranton (R)	Charles N. Brumm (GB)	Samuel F. Barr (R)	Cornelius C. Jadwin (R)	Robert J. C. Walker (R)	Jacob M. Campbell (R)	Horatio; G. Fisher (R)	Frank E. Beltz- hoover (D)	Andrew G. Curtin (D)	Morgan; R. Wise (D)	Russell; Errett (R)	Thomas; M. Bayne (R)	William; S. Shallen- berger (R)	James; Mosgrove (GB)	Samuel H. Miller (R)	Lewis F. Watson (R)	47th (1881–1883)

=== 1883–1893: 28 seats ===
Following the 1880 census, the delegation grew by one seat. Until 1889, that seat was elected at-large statewide. After 1889, the state was redistricted into 28 districts.

Congress
48th
(1883–1885)
49th
(1885–1887)
50th
(1887–1889)
51st
(1889–1891)
52nd
(1891–1893)

District																												Congress
1st	2nd	3rd	4th	5th	6th	7th	8th	9th	10th	11th	12th	13th	14th	15th	16th	17th	18th	19th	20th	21st	22nd	23rd	24th	25th	26th	27th	At-large	Congress
Henry; H. Bingham (R)	Charles; O'Neill (R)	Samuel J. Randall (D)	William; D. Kelley (R)	Alfred; C. Harmer (R)	James; B. Everhart (R)	Isaac; Newton; Evans (R)	Daniel; Ermen- trout (D)	A. Herr; Smith (R)	William; Mutchler (D)	John B. Storm (D)	Daniel W. Connolly (D)	Charles N. Brumm (GB)	Samuel; Fleming; Barr (R)	George; Adams; Post (D)	William; Wallace; Brown (R)	Jacob; M. Campbell (R)	Louis E. Atkinson (R)	William A. Duncan (D)	Andrew; Gregg; Curtin (D)	Charles; Edmund; Boyle (D)	James H. Hopkins (D)	Thomas; M. Bayne (R)	George V. Lawrence (R)	John D. Patton (D)	Samuel; H. Miller (R)	Samuel M. Brainerd (R)	Mortimer; F. Elliott (D)	48th (1883–1885)
Henry; H. Bingham (R)	Charles; O'Neill (R)	Samuel J. Randall (D)	William; D. Kelley (R)	Alfred; C. Harmer (R)	James; B. Everhart (R)	Isaac; Newton; Evans (R)	Daniel; Ermen- trout (D)	A. Herr; Smith (R)	William; Mutchler (D)	John B. Storm (D)	Daniel W. Connolly (D)	Charles N. Brumm (GB)	Samuel; Fleming; Barr (R)	George; Adams; Post (D)	William; Wallace; Brown (R)	Jacob; M. Campbell (R)	Louis E. Atkinson (R)	John; Augustus; Swope (D)	Andrew; Gregg; Curtin (D)	Charles; Edmund; Boyle (D)	James H. Hopkins (D)	Thomas; M. Bayne (R)	George V. Lawrence (R)	John D. Patton (D)	Samuel; H. Miller (R)	Samuel M. Brainerd (R)	Mortimer; F. Elliott (D)	48th (1883–1885)
Henry; H. Bingham (R)	Charles; O'Neill (R)	Samuel J. Randall (D)	William; D. Kelley (R)	Alfred; C. Harmer (R)	James; B. Everhart (R)	Isaac; Newton; Evans (R)	Daniel; Ermen- trout (D)	John A. Hiestand (R)	William; H. Sowden (D)	John B. Storm (D)	Joseph A. Scranton (R)	Charles N. Brumm (R)	Franklin; Bound (R)	Frank; C. Bunnell (R)	William; Wallace; Brown (R)	Jacob; M. Campbell (R)	Louis E. Atkinson (R)	John; Augustus; Swope (D)	Andrew; Gregg; Curtin (D)	Charles; Edmund; Boyle (D)	James S. Negley (R)	Thomas; M. Bayne (R)	Oscar L. Jackson (R)	Alexander C. White (R)	George W. Fleeger (R)	William; Lawrence; Scott (D)	Edwin S. Osborne (R)	49th (1885–1887)
Henry; H. Bingham (R)	Charles; O'Neill (R)	Samuel J. Randall (D)	William; D. Kelley (R)	Alfred; C. Harmer (R)	Smedley; Darling- ton (R)	Robert; M. Yardley (R)	Daniel; Ermen- trout (D)	John A. Hiestand (R)	William; H. Sowden (D)	Charles R. Buckalew (D)	John; Lynch (D)	Charles N. Brumm (R)	Franklin; Bound (R)	Frank; C. Bunnell (R)	Henry; C. McCor- mick (R)	Edward; Scull (R)	Louis E. Atkinson (R)	Levi; Maish (D)	John; Patton (R)	Welty; McCullogh (R)	John; Dalzell (R)	Thomas; M. Bayne (R)	Oscar L. Jackson (R)	James T. Maffett (R)	Norman; Hall (D)	William; Lawrence; Scott (D)	Edwin S. Osborne (R)	50th (1887–1889)
Henry; H. Bingham (R)	Charles; O'Neill (R)	Samuel J. Randall (D)	William; D. Kelley (R)	Alfred; C. Harmer (R)	Smedley; Darling- ton (R)	Robert; M. Yardley (R)	Daniel; Ermen- trout (D)	John A. Hiestand (R)	William; H. Sowden (D)	Charles R. Buckalew (D)	John; Lynch (D)	Charles N. Brumm (R)	Franklin; Bound (R)	Frank; C. Bunnell (R)	Henry; C. McCor- mick (R)	Edward; Scull (R)	Louis E. Atkinson (R)	Levi; Maish (D)	John; Patton (R)	Welty; McCullogh (R)	John; Dalzell (R)	Thomas; M. Bayne (R)	Oscar L. Jackson (R)	James T. Maffett (R)	Norman; Hall (D)	William; Lawrence; Scott (D)	28th	50th (1887–1889)
Henry; H. Bingham (R)	Charles; O'Neill (R)	Samuel J. Randall (D)	William; D. Kelley (R)	Alfred; C. Harmer (R)	Smedley; Darling- ton (R)	Robert; M. Yardley (R)	William; Mutchler (D)	David B. Brunner (D)	Marriott; Brosius (R)	Joseph A. Scranton (R)	Edwin S. Osborne (R)	James B. Reilly (D)	John W. Rife (R)	Myron; B. Wright (R)	Henry; C. McCor- mick (R)	Charles R. Buckalew (D)	Louis E. Atkinson (R)	Levi; Maish (D)	Edward; Scull (R)	Samuel; Alfred; Craig (R)	John; Dalzell (R)	Thomas; M. Bayne (R)	Joseph; W. Ray (R)	Charles C. Townsend (R)	William C. Culbertson (R)	Lewis F. Watson (R)	James; Kerr (D)	51st (1889–1891)
Henry; H. Bingham (R)	Charles; O'Neill (R)	R. Vaux (D)	John E. Reyburn (R)	Alfred; C. Harmer (R)	Smedley; Darling- ton (R)	Robert; M. Yardley (R)	William; Mutchler (D)	David B. Brunner (D)	Marriott; Brosius (R)	Joseph A. Scranton (R)	Edwin S. Osborne (R)	James B. Reilly (D)	John W. Rife (R)	Myron; B. Wright (R)	Henry; C. McCor- mick (R)	Charles R. Buckalew (D)	Louis E. Atkinson (R)	Levi; Maish (D)	Edward; Scull (R)	Samuel; Alfred; Craig (R)	John; Dalzell (R)	Thomas; M. Bayne (R)	Joseph; W. Ray (R)	Charles C. Townsend (R)	William C. Culbertson (R)	Charles; W. Stone (R)	James; Kerr (D)	51st (1889–1891)
Henry; H. Bingham (R)	Charles; O'Neill (R)	William; McAleer (D)	John E. Reyburn (R)	Alfred; C. Harmer (R)	John B. Robinson (R)	Edwin; Hallowell (D)	William; Mutchler (D)	David B. Brunner (D)	Marriott; Brosius (R)	Lemuel; Amerman (D)	George W. Shonk (R)	James B. Reilly (D)	John W. Rife (R)	Myron; B. Wright (R)	Albert C. Hopkins (R)	Simon P. Wolverton (D)	Louis E. Atkinson (R)	Frank E. Beltzhoover (D)	Edward; Scull (R)	George F. Huff (R)	John; Dalzell (R)	William; A. Stone (R)	A. Stewart (R)	Eugene P. Gillespie (D)	Matthew; Griswold (R)	Charles; W. Stone (R)	George; F. Kribbs (D)	52nd (1891–1893)
Henry; H. Bingham (R)	Charles; O'Neill (R)	William; McAleer (D)	John E. Reyburn (R)	Alfred; C. Harmer (R)	John B. Robinson (R)	Edwin; Hallowell (D)	William; Mutchler (D)	David B. Brunner (D)	Marriott; Brosius (R)	Lemuel; Amerman (D)	George W. Shonk (R)	James B. Reilly (D)	John W. Rife (R)	Myron; B. Wright (R)	Albert C. Hopkins (R)	Simon P. Wolverton (D)	Louis E. Atkinson (R)	Frank E. Beltzhoover (D)	Edward; Scull (R)	George F. Huff (R)	John; Dalzell (R)	William; A. Stone (R)	A. K. Craig (D)	Eugene P. Gillespie (D)	Matthew; Griswold (R)	Charles; W. Stone (R)	George; F. Kribbs (D)	52nd (1891–1893)
Henry; H. Bingham (R)	Charles; O'Neill (R)	William; McAleer (D)	John E. Reyburn (R)	Alfred; C. Harmer (R)	John B. Robinson (R)	Edwin; Hallowell (D)	William; Mutchler (D)	David B. Brunner (D)	Marriott; Brosius (R)	Lemuel; Amerman (D)	George W. Shonk (R)	James B. Reilly (D)	John W. Rife (R)	Myron; B. Wright (R)	Albert C. Hopkins (R)	Simon P. Wolverton (D)	Louis E. Atkinson (R)	Frank E. Beltzhoover (D)	Edward; Scull (R)	George F. Huff (R)	John; Dalzell (R)	William; A. Stone (R)	W. A. Sipe (D)	Eugene P. Gillespie (D)	Matthew; Griswold (R)	Charles; W. Stone (R)	George; F. Kribbs (D)	52nd (1891–1893)

=== 1893–1903: 30 seats ===
Following the 1890 census, the delegation grew by two seats. Those two additional seats were elected at-large across the entire commonwealth.

Congress
53rd
(1893–1895)
54th
(1895–1897)
55th
(1897–1899)
56th
(1899–1901)
57th
(1901–1903)

District																												At-large		Congress
1st	2nd	3rd	4th	5th	6th	7th	8th	9th	10th	11th	12th	13th	14th	15th	16th	17th	18th	19th	20th	21st	22nd	23rd	24th	25th	26th	27th	28th	At-large		Congress
Henry; H. Bingham (R)	Charles; O'Neill (R)	William; McAleer (ID)	John E. Reyburn (R)	Alfred C. Harmer (R)	John; Buchanan; Robinson (R)	Irving; P. Wanger (R)	William; Mutchler (D)	Constantine; J. Erdman (D)	Marriott; Brosius (R)	Joseph A. Scranton (R)	William; Henry; Hines (D)	James; B. Reilly (D)	Ephraim; M. Woomer (R)	Myron B. Wright (R)	Albert; C. Hopkins (R)	Simon P. Wolverton (D)	Thaddeus; M. Mahon (R)	Frank E. Beltzhoover (D)	Josiah; D. Hicks (R)	Daniel B. Heiner (R)	John; Dalzell (R)	William; A. Stone (R)	William; A. Sipe (D)	Thomas; Wharton; Phillips (R)	Joseph C. Sibley (D)	Charles; W. Stone (R)	George; F. Kribbs (D)	William; Lilly (R)	Alexander; McDowell (R)	53rd (1893–1895)
Henry; H. Bingham (R)	Robert; Adams; Jr. (R)	William; McAleer (ID)	John E. Reyburn (R)	Alfred C. Harmer (R)	John; Buchanan; Robinson (R)	Irving; P. Wanger (R)	Howard; Mutchler (D)	Constantine; J. Erdman (D)	Marriott; Brosius (R)	Joseph A. Scranton (R)	William; Henry; Hines (D)	James; B. Reilly (D)	Ephraim; M. Woomer (R)	Edwin J. Jorden (R)	Albert; C. Hopkins (R)	Simon P. Wolverton (D)	Thaddeus; M. Mahon (R)	Frank E. Beltzhoover (D)	Josiah; D. Hicks (R)	Daniel B. Heiner (R)	John; Dalzell (R)	William; A. Stone (R)	William; A. Sipe (D)	Thomas; Wharton; Phillips (R)	Joseph C. Sibley (D)	Charles; W. Stone (R)	George; F. Kribbs (D)	Galusha; A. Grow (R)	Alexander; McDowell (R)	53rd (1893–1895)
Henry; H. Bingham (R)	Robert; Adams; Jr. (R)	Frederick; Halterman (R)	John E. Reyburn (R)	Alfred C. Harmer (R)	John; Buchanan; Robinson (R)	Irving; P. Wanger (R)	Joseph J. Hart (D)	Constantine; J. Erdman (D)	Marriott; Brosius (R)	Joseph A. Scranton (R)	John; Leisenring (R)	Charles N. Brumm (R)	Ephraim; M. Woomer (R)	James H. Codding (R)	Fred C. Leonard (R)	Monroe; Henry; Kulp (R)	Thaddeus; M. Mahon (R)	James A. Stahle (R)	Josiah; D. Hicks (R)	Daniel B. Heiner (R)	John; Dalzell (R)	William; A. Stone (R)	Ernest F. Acheson (R)	Thomas; Wharton; Phillips (R)	Matthew; Griswold (R)	Charles; W. Stone (R)	William; C. Arnold (R)	Galusha; A. Grow (R)	George F. Huff (R)	54th (1895–1897)
Henry; H. Bingham (R)	Robert; Adams; Jr. (R)	William; McAleer (D)	James R. Young (R)	Alfred C. Harmer (R)	Thomas S. Butler (IR)	Irving; P. Wanger (R)	William S. Kirkpatrick (R)	Daniel; Ermentrout (D)	Marriott; Brosius (R)	William; Connell (R)	Morgan B. Williams (R)	Charles N. Brumm (R)	Marlin; E. Olmsted (R)	James H. Codding (R)	Horace; B. Packer (R)	Monroe; Henry; Kulp (R)	Thaddeus; M. Mahon (R)	George J. Benner (D)	Josiah; D. Hicks (R)	Edward E. Robbins (R)	John; Dalzell (R)	William; A. Stone (R)	Ernest F. Acheson (R)	Joseph; B. Showalter (R)	John C. Sturtevant (R)	Charles; W. Stone (R)	William; C. Arnold (R)	Galusha; A. Grow (R)	Samuel; A. Davenport (R)	55th (1897–1899)
Henry; H. Bingham (R)	Robert; Adams; Jr. (R)	William; McAleer (D)	James R. Young (R)	Alfred C. Harmer (R)	Thomas S. Butler (IR)	Irving; P. Wanger (R)	William S. Kirkpatrick (R)	Daniel; Ermentrout (D)	Marriott; Brosius (R)	William; Connell (R)	Morgan B. Williams (R)	Charles N. Brumm (R)	Marlin; E. Olmsted (R)	James H. Codding (R)	Horace; B. Packer (R)	Monroe; Henry; Kulp (R)	Thaddeus; M. Mahon (R)	George J. Benner (D)	Josiah; D. Hicks (R)	Edward E. Robbins (R)	John; Dalzell (R)	William; H. Graham (R)	Ernest F. Acheson (R)	Joseph; B. Showalter (R)	John C. Sturtevant (R)	Charles; W. Stone (R)	William; C. Arnold (R)	Galusha; A. Grow (R)	Samuel; A. Davenport (R)	55th (1897–1899)
Henry; H. Bingham (R)	Robert; Adams; Jr. (R)	William; McAleer (D)	James R. Young (R)	Alfred C. Harmer (R)	Thomas S. Butler (R)	Irving; P. Wanger (R)	Laird H. Barber (D)	Daniel; Ermentrout (D)	Marriott; Brosius (R)	William; Connell (R)	Stanley W. Davenport (D)	James W. Ryan (D)	Marlin; E. Olmsted (R)	Charles; Frederick; Wright (R)	Horace; B. Packer (R)	Rufus K. Polk (D)	Thaddeus; M. Mahon (R)	Edward D. Ziegler (D)	Joseph E. Thropp (R)	Summers; M. Jack (R)	John; Dalzell (R)	William; H. Graham (R)	Ernest F. Acheson (R)	Joseph; B. Showalter (R)	Athelston; Gaston (D)	Joseph C. Sibley (D)	James; Knox; Polk; Hall (D)	Galusha; A. Grow (R)	Samuel; A. Davenport (R)	56th (1899–1901)
Henry; H. Bingham (R)	Robert; Adams; Jr. (R)	William; McAleer (D)	James R. Young (R)	Edward de Veaux; Morrell (R)	Thomas S. Butler (R)	Irving; P. Wanger (R)	Laird H. Barber (D)	Henry D. Green (D)	Marriott; Brosius (R)	William; Connell (R)	Stanley W. Davenport (D)	James W. Ryan (D)	Marlin; E. Olmsted (R)	Charles; Frederick; Wright (R)	Horace; B. Packer (R)	Rufus K. Polk (D)	Thaddeus; M. Mahon (R)	Edward D. Ziegler (D)	Joseph E. Thropp (R)	Summers; M. Jack (R)	John; Dalzell (R)	William; H. Graham (R)	Ernest F. Acheson (R)	Joseph; B. Showalter (R)	Athelston; Gaston (D)	Joseph C. Sibley (D)	James; Knox; Polk; Hall (D)	Galusha; A. Grow (R)	Samuel; A. Davenport (R)	56th (1899–1901)
Henry; H. Bingham (R)	Robert; Adams; Jr. (R)	Henry; Burk (R)	James R. Young (R)	Edward de Veaux; Morrell (R)	Thomas S. Butler (R)	Irving; P. Wanger (R)	Howard; Mutchler (D)	Henry D. Green (D)	Marriott; Brosius (R)	William; Connell (R)	Henry W. Palmer (R)	George R. Patterson (R)	Marlin; E. Olmsted (R)	Charles; Frederick; Wright (R)	Elias; Deemer (R)	Rufus K. Polk (D)	Thaddeus; M. Mahon (R)	Robert; Jacob; Lewis (R)	Alvin; Evans (R)	Summers; M. Jack (R)	John; Dalzell (R)	William; H. Graham (R)	Ernest F. Acheson (R)	Joseph; B. Showalter (R)	Arthur; L. Bates (R)	Joseph C. Sibley (R)	James; Knox; Polk; Hall (D)	Galusha; A. Grow (R)	Robert H. Foerderer (R)	57th (1901–1903)
Henry; H. Bingham (R)	Robert; Adams; Jr. (R)	Henry; Burk (R)	James R. Young (R)	Edward de Veaux; Morrell (R)	Thomas S. Butler (R)	Irving; P. Wanger (R)	Howard; Mutchler (D)	Henry D. Green (D)	Henry B. Cassel (R)	William; Connell (R)	Henry W. Palmer (R)	George R. Patterson (R)	Marlin; E. Olmsted (R)	Charles; Frederick; Wright (R)	Elias; Deemer (R)	Alexander; Billmeyer (D)	Thaddeus; M. Mahon (R)	Robert; Jacob; Lewis (R)	Alvin; Evans (R)	Summers; M. Jack (R)	John; Dalzell (R)	William; H. Graham (R)	Ernest F. Acheson (R)	Joseph; B. Showalter (R)	Arthur; L. Bates (R)	Joseph C. Sibley (R)	James; Knox; Polk; Hall (D)	Galusha; A. Grow (R)	Robert H. Foerderer (R)	57th (1901–1903)

=== 1903–1913: 32 seats ===
Following the 1900 census, the delegation grew by two seats.

Congress
58th
(1903–1905)
59th
(1905–1907)
60th
(1907–1909)
61st
(1909–1911)
62nd
(1911–1913)

District																																Congress
1st	2nd	3rd	4th	5th	6th	7th	8th	9th	10th	11th	12th	13th	14th	15th	16th	17th	18th	19th	20th	21st	22nd	23rd	24th	25th	26th	27th	28th	29th	30th	31st	32nd	Congress
Henry H. Bingham (R)	Robert; Adams; Jr. (R)	Henry; Burk (R)	Robert H. Foerderer (R)	Edward de Veaux; Morrell (R)	George; D. McCreary (R)	Thomas; S. Butler (R)	Irving; P. Wanger (R)	Henry; B. Cassel (R)	George; Howell (D)	Henry W. Palmer (R)	George R. Patterson (R)	Marcus; C. L. Kline (D)	Charles; Frederick; Wright (R)	Elias; Deemer (R)	Charles H. Dickerman (D)	Thaddeus; M. Mahon (R)	Marlin; E. Olmsted (R)	Alvin; Evans (R)	Daniel; F. Lafean (R)	Solomon; R. Dresser (R)	George; F. Huff (R)	Allen; F. Cooper (R)	Ernest F. Acheson (R)	Arthur; L. Bates (R)	Joseph; H. Shull (D)	William; Orlando; Smith (R)	Joseph; C. Sibley (R)	George; Shiras; III (IR)	John; Dalzell (R)	Henry; Kirke; Porter (IR)	James W. Brown (IR)	58th (1903–1905)
Henry H. Bingham (R)	Robert; Adams; Jr. (R)	George; A. Castor (R)	Reuben; Moon (R)	Edward de Veaux; Morrell (R)	George; D. McCreary (R)	Thomas; S. Butler (R)	Irving; P. Wanger (R)	Henry; B. Cassel (R)	William; Connell (R)	Henry W. Palmer (R)	George R. Patterson (R)	Marcus; C. L. Kline (D)	Charles; Frederick; Wright (R)	Elias; Deemer (R)	Charles H. Dickerman (D)	Thaddeus; M. Mahon (R)	Marlin; E. Olmsted (R)	Alvin; Evans (R)	Daniel; F. Lafean (R)	Solomon; R. Dresser (R)	George; F. Huff (R)	Allen; F. Cooper (R)	Ernest F. Acheson (R)	Arthur; L. Bates (R)	Joseph; H. Shull (D)	William; Orlando; Smith (R)	Joseph; C. Sibley (R)	George; Shiras; III (IR)	John; Dalzell (R)	Henry; Kirke; Porter (IR)	James W. Brown (IR)	58th (1903–1905)
Henry H. Bingham (R)	Robert; Adams; Jr. (R)	George; A. Castor (R)	Reuben; Moon (R)	Edward de Veaux; Morrell (R)	George; D. McCreary (R)	Thomas; S. Butler (R)	Irving; P. Wanger (R)	Henry; B. Cassel (R)	Thomas H. Dale (R)	Henry W. Palmer (R)	George R. Patterson (R)	Marcus; C. L. Kline (D)	Mial E. Lilley (R)	Elias; Deemer (R)	Edmund W. Samuel (R)	Thaddeus; M. Mahon (R)	Marlin; E. Olmsted (R)	John; Merriman; Reynolds (R)	Daniel; F. Lafean (R)	Solomon; R. Dresser (R)	George; F. Huff (R)	Allen; F. Cooper (R)	Ernest F. Acheson (R)	Arthur; L. Bates (R)	Gustav A. Schneebeli (R)	William; Orlando; Smith (R)	Joseph; C. Sibley (R)	William; H. Graham (R)	John; Dalzell (R)	James; F. Burke (R)	Andrew; J. Barchfeld (R)	59th (1905–1907)
Henry H. Bingham (R)	John E. Reyburn (R)	J. Hampton; Moore (R)	Reuben; Moon (R)	Edward de Veaux; Morrell (R)	George; D. McCreary (R)	Thomas; S. Butler (R)	Irving; P. Wanger (R)	Henry; B. Cassel (R)	Thomas H. Dale (R)	Henry W. Palmer (R)	Charles N. Brumm (R)	Marcus; C. L. Kline (D)	Mial E. Lilley (R)	Elias; Deemer (R)	Edmund W. Samuel (R)	Thaddeus; M. Mahon (R)	Marlin; E. Olmsted (R)	John; Merriman; Reynolds (R)	Daniel; F. Lafean (R)	Solomon; R. Dresser (R)	George; F. Huff (R)	Allen; F. Cooper (R)	Ernest F. Acheson (R)	Arthur; L. Bates (R)	Gustav A. Schneebeli (R)	William; Orlando; Smith (R)	Joseph; C. Sibley (R)	William; H. Graham (R)	John; Dalzell (R)	James; F. Burke (R)	Andrew; J. Barchfeld (R)	59th (1905–1907)
Henry H. Bingham (R)	John E. Reyburn (R)	J. Hampton; Moore (R)	Reuben; Moon (R)	William; W. Foulkrod (R)	George; D. McCreary (R)	Thomas; S. Butler (R)	Irving; P. Wanger (R)	Henry; B. Cassel (R)	Thomas; D. Nicholls (ID)	John T. Lenahan (D)	Charles N. Brumm (R)	John H. Rothermel (D)	George W. Kipp (D)	William; B. Wilson (D)	John; G. McHenry (D)	Benjamin; K. Focht (R)	Marlin; E. Olmsted (R)	John; Merriman; Reynolds (R)	Daniel; F. Lafean (R)	Charles; Frederick; Barclay (R)	George; F. Huff (R)	Allen; F. Cooper (R)	Ernest F. Acheson (R)	Arthur; L. Bates (R)	J. Davis; Brodhead (D)	Joseph G. Beale (R)	Nelson; P. Wheeler (R)	William; H. Graham (R)	John; Dalzell (R)	James; F. Burke (R)	Andrew; J. Barchfeld (R)	60th (1907–1909)
Henry H. Bingham (R)	Joel; Cook (R)	J. Hampton; Moore (R)	Reuben; Moon (R)	William; W. Foulkrod (R)	George; D. McCreary (R)	Thomas; S. Butler (R)	Irving; P. Wanger (R)	Henry; B. Cassel (R)	Thomas; D. Nicholls (ID)	John T. Lenahan (D)	Charles N. Brumm (R)	John H. Rothermel (D)	George W. Kipp (D)	William; B. Wilson (D)	John; G. McHenry (D)	Benjamin; K. Focht (R)	Marlin; E. Olmsted (R)	John; Merriman; Reynolds (R)	Daniel; F. Lafean (R)	Charles; Frederick; Barclay (R)	George; F. Huff (R)	Allen; F. Cooper (R)	Ernest F. Acheson (R)	Arthur; L. Bates (R)	J. Davis; Brodhead (D)	Joseph G. Beale (R)	Nelson; P. Wheeler (R)	William; H. Graham (R)	John; Dalzell (R)	James; F. Burke (R)	Andrew; J. Barchfeld (R)	60th (1907–1909)
Henry H. Bingham (R)	Joel; Cook (R)	J. Hampton; Moore (R)	Reuben; Moon (R)	William; W. Foulkrod (R)	George; D. McCreary (R)	Thomas; S. Butler (R)	Irving; P. Wanger (R)	William; W. Griest (R)	Thomas; D. Nicholls (ID)	Henry W. Palmer (R)	Alfred B. Garner (R)	John H. Rothermel (D)	Charles C. Pratt (R)	William; B. Wilson (D)	John; G. McHenry (D)	Benjamin; K. Focht (R)	Marlin; E. Olmsted (R)	John; Merriman; Reynolds (R)	Daniel; F. Lafean (R)	Charles; Frederick; Barclay (R)	George; F. Huff (R)	Allen; F. Cooper (R)	John K. Tener (R)	Arthur; L. Bates (R)	A. Mitchell; Palmer (D)	J. N. Langham (R)	Nelson; P. Wheeler (R)	William; H. Graham (R)	John; Dalzell (R)	James; F. Burke (R)	Andrew; J. Barchfeld (R)	61st (1909–1911)
Henry H. Bingham (R)	William S. Reyburn (R)	J. Hampton; Moore (R)	Reuben; Moon (R)	Michael; Donohoe (D)	George; D. McCreary (R)	Thomas; S. Butler (R)	Robert E. Difen- derfer (D)	William; W. Griest (R)	John R. Farr (R)	Charles; Calvin; Bowman (R)	Robert; Emmett; Lee (D)	John H. Rothermel (D)	George W. Kipp (D)	William; B. Wilson (D)	John; G. McHenry (D)	Benjamin; K. Focht (R)	Marlin; E. Olmsted (R)	Jesse; L. Hartman (R)	Daniel; F. Lafean (R)	Charles; Emory; Patton (R)	Curtis; H. Gregg (D)	Thomas; S. Crago (R)	Charles; Matthews (R)	Arthur; L. Bates (R)	A. Mitchell; Palmer (D)	J. N. Langham (R)	Peter; Moore; Speer (R)	Stephen; G. Porter (R)	John; Dalzell (R)	James; F. Burke (R)	Andrew; J. Barchfeld (R)	62nd (1911–1913)
William S. Vare (R)	William S. Reyburn (R)	J. Hampton; Moore (R)	Reuben; Moon (R)	Michael; Donohoe (D)	George; D. McCreary (R)	Thomas; S. Butler (R)	Robert E. Difen- derfer (D)	William; W. Griest (R)	John R. Farr (R)	Charles; Calvin; Bowman (R)	Robert; Emmett; Lee (D)	John H. Rothermel (D)	William D. B. Ainey (R)	William; B. Wilson (D)	John; G. McHenry (D)	Benjamin; K. Focht (R)	Marlin; E. Olmsted (R)	Jesse; L. Hartman (R)	Daniel; F. Lafean (R)	Charles; Emory; Patton (R)	Curtis; H. Gregg (D)	Thomas; S. Crago (R)	Charles; Matthews (R)	Arthur; L. Bates (R)	A. Mitchell; Palmer (D)	J. N. Langham (R)	Peter; Moore; Speer (R)	Stephen; G. Porter (R)	John; Dalzell (R)	James; F. Burke (R)	Andrew; J. Barchfeld (R)	62nd (1911–1913)

=== 1913–1933: 36 seats ===
Following the 1910 census, the delegation grew by four seats to its largest size to date. The four new seats were elected at-large statewide. Starting in 1923, however, four new districts were added to replace the at-large seats.
The results of the 1920 census revealed a major and continuing shift of the population of the U.S. from rural to urban areas. However, no apportionment was carried out following the 1920 census

Congress
63rd
(1913–1915)
64th
(1915–1917)
65th
(1917–1919)
66th
(1919–1921)
67th
(1921–1923)
68th
(1923–1925)
69th
(1925–1927)
70th
(1927–1929)
71st
(1929–1931)
72nd
(1931–1933)

District																																At-large				Congress
1st	2nd	3rd	4th	5th	6th	7th	8th	9th	10th	11th	12th	13th	14th	15th	16th	17th	18th	19th	20th	21st	22nd	23rd	24th	25th	26th	27th	28th	29th	30th	31st	32nd	Seat A	Seat B	Seat C	Seat D	Congress
William; Scott; Vare (R)	George; S. Graham (R)	J. Hampton; Moore (R)	George; W. Edmonds (R)	Michael; Donohoe (D)	J. W. Logue (D)	Thomas; S. Butler (R)	Robert E. Difenderfer (D)	William; W. Griest (R)	John R. Farr (R)	John J. Casey (D)	Robert; Emmett; Lee (D)	John H. Rothermel (D)	William; D. B. Ainey (R)	Edgar; R. Kiess (R)	John; V. Lesher (D)	Franklin L. Dershem (D)	Aaron; S. Kreider (R)	Warren; W. Bailey (D)	Andrew R. Brodbeck (D)	Charles E. Patton (R)	Abraham; Lincoln; Keister (R)	Wooda N. Carr (D)	Henry W. Temple (Prog)	Milton W. Shreve (R)	A. Mitchell; Palmer (D)	J. N. Langham (R)	Willis J. Hulings (Prog)	Stephen; G. Porter (R)	M. Clyde; Kelly (R)	James F. Burke (R)	Andrew; J. Barchfeld (R)	Fred E. Lewis (R)	John M. Morin (R)	Anderson; H. Walters (R)	Arthur R. Rupley (R)	63rd (1913–1915)
William; Scott; Vare (R)	George; S. Graham (R)	J. Hampton; Moore (R)	George; W. Edmonds (R)	Peter E. Costello (R)	George P. Darrow (R)	Thomas; S. Butler (R)	Henry; Winfield; Watson (R)	William; W. Griest (R)	John R. Farr (R)	John J. Casey (D)	Robert; D. Heaton (R)	Arthur; G. Dewalt (D)	Louis; T. McFadden (R)	Edgar; R. Kiess (R)	John; V. Lesher (D)	Benjamin K. Focht (R)	Aaron; S. Kreider (R)	Warren; W. Bailey (D)	C. William; Beales (R)	Charles; H. Rowland (R)	Abraham; Lincoln; Keister (R)	Robert F. Hopwood (R)	Henry; W. Temple (R)	Michael; Liebel Jr. (D)	Henry; J. Steele (D)	S. Taylor; North (R)	Samuel H. Miller (R)	Stephen; G. Porter (R)	William H. Coleman (R)	John M. Morin (R)	Andrew; J. Barchfeld (R)	John; R. K. Scott (R)	Thomas S. Crago (R)	Daniel F. Lafean (R)	Mahlon; M. Garland (R)	64th (1915–1917)
William; Scott; Vare (R)	George; S. Graham (R)	J. Hampton; Moore (R)	George; W. Edmonds (R)	Peter E. Costello (R)	George P. Darrow (R)	Thomas; S. Butler (R)	Henry; Winfield; Watson (R)	William; W. Griest (R)	John R. Farr (R)	Thomas W. Templeton (R)	Robert; D. Heaton (R)	Arthur; G. Dewalt (D)	Louis; T. McFadden (R)	Edgar; R. Kiess (R)	John; V. Lesher (D)	Benjamin K. Focht (R)	Aaron; S. Kreider (R)	John; M. Rose (R)	Andrew R. Brodbeck (D)	Charles; H. Rowland (R)	Edward; E. Robbins (R)	Bruce; F. Sterling (D)	Henry; W. Temple (R)	Henry; Alden; Clark (R)	Henry; J. Steele (D)	Nathan; L. Strong (R)	Orrin D. Bleakley (R)	Stephen; G. Porter (R)	M. Clyde; Kelly (Prog)	John M. Morin (R)	Guy E. Campbell (D)	John; R. K. Scott (R)	Thomas S. Crago (R)	Joseph; McLaughlin (R)	Mahlon; M. Garland (R)	65th (1917–1919)
William; Scott; Vare (R)	George; S. Graham (R)	J. Hampton; Moore (R)	George; W. Edmonds (R)	Peter E. Costello (R)	George P. Darrow (R)	Thomas; S. Butler (R)	Henry; Winfield; Watson (R)	William; W. Griest (R)	John R. Farr (R)	Thomas W. Templeton (R)	Robert; D. Heaton (R)	Arthur; G. Dewalt (D)	Louis; T. McFadden (R)	Edgar; R. Kiess (R)	John; V. Lesher (D)	Benjamin K. Focht (R)	Aaron; S. Kreider (R)	John; M. Rose (R)	Andrew R. Brodbeck (D)	Charles; H. Rowland (R)	Edward; E. Robbins (R)	Bruce; F. Sterling (D)	Henry; W. Temple (R)	Henry; Alden; Clark (R)	Henry; J. Steele (D)	Nathan; L. Strong (R)	Earl H. Beshlin (D)	Stephen; G. Porter (R)	M. Clyde; Kelly (Prog)	John M. Morin (R)	Guy E. Campbell (D)	John; R. K. Scott (R)	Thomas S. Crago (R)	Joseph; McLaughlin (R)	Mahlon; M. Garland (R)	65th (1917–1919)
William; Scott; Vare (R)	George; S. Graham (R)	J. Hampton; Moore (R)	George; W. Edmonds (R)	Peter E. Costello (R)	George P. Darrow (R)	Thomas; S. Butler (R)	Henry; Winfield; Watson (R)	William; W. Griest (R)	Patrick; McLane (D)	John J. Casey (D)	John; Reber (R)	Arthur; G. Dewalt (D)	Louis; T. McFadden (R)	Edgar; R. Kiess (R)	John; V. Lesher (D)	Benjamin K. Focht (R)	Aaron; S. Kreider (R)	John; M. Rose (R)	Edward; S. Brooks (R)	Evan J. Jones (R)	John; Haden; Wilson (D)	Samuel; A. Kendall (R)	Henry; W. Temple (R)	Milton W. Shreve (R)	Henry; J. Steele (D)	Nathan; L. Strong (R)	Willis J. Hulings (R)	Stephen; G. Porter (R)	M. Clyde; Kelly (R)	John M. Morin (R)	Guy E. Campbell (D)	William; J. Burke (R)	Thomas S. Crago (R)	Anderson; H. Walters (R)	Mahlon; M. Garland (R)	66th (1919–1921)
William; Scott; Vare (R)	George; S. Graham (R)	Harry; C. Ransley (R)	George; W. Edmonds (R)	Peter E. Costello (R)	George P. Darrow (R)	Thomas; S. Butler (R)	Henry; Winfield; Watson (R)	William; W. Griest (R)	John R. Farr (R)	John J. Casey (D)	John; Reber (R)	Arthur; G. Dewalt (D)	Louis; T. McFadden (R)	Edgar; R. Kiess (R)	John; V. Lesher (D)	Benjamin K. Focht (R)	Aaron; S. Kreider (R)	John; M. Rose (R)	Edward; S. Brooks (R)	Evan J. Jones (R)	John; Haden; Wilson (D)	Samuel; A. Kendall (R)	Henry; W. Temple (R)	Milton W. Shreve (R)	Henry; J. Steele (D)	Nathan; L. Strong (R)	Willis J. Hulings (R)	Stephen; G. Porter (R)	M. Clyde; Kelly (R)	John M. Morin (R)	Guy E. Campbell (D)	William; J. Burke (R)	Thomas S. Crago (R)	Anderson; H. Walters (R)	Mahlon; M. Garland (R)	66th (1919–1921)
William; Scott; Vare (R)	George; S. Graham (R)	Harry; C. Ransley (R)	George; W. Edmonds (R)	James J. Connolly (R)	George P. Darrow (R)	Thomas; S. Butler (R)	Henry; Winfield; Watson (R)	William; W. Griest (R)	Charles R. Connell (R)	Clarence D. Coughlin (R)	John; Reber (R)	Fred B. Gernerd (R)	Louis; T. McFadden (R)	Edgar; R. Kiess (R)	I. Clinton; Kline (R)	Benjamin K. Focht (R)	Aaron; S. Kreider (R)	John; M. Rose (R)	Edward; S. Brooks (R)	Evan J. Jones (R)	Adam; Wyant (R)	Samuel; A. Kendall (R)	Henry; W. Temple (R)	Milton W. Shreve (IR)	William H. Kirkpatrick (R)	Nathan; L. Strong (R)	Harris; J. Bixler (R)	Stephen; G. Porter (R)	M. Clyde; Kelly (R)	John M. Morin (R)	Guy E. Campbell (D)	William; J. Burke (R)	Joseph; McLaughlin (R)	Anderson; H. Walters (R)	Thomas S. Crago (R)	67th (1921–1923)
William; Scott; Vare (R)	George; S. Graham (R)	Harry; C. Ransley (R)	George; W. Edmonds (R)	James J. Connolly (R)	George P. Darrow (R)	Thomas; S. Butler (R)	Henry; Winfield; Watson (R)	William; W. Griest (R)	Charles R. Connell (R)	Clarence D. Coughlin (R)	John; Reber (R)	Fred B. Gernerd (R)	Louis; T. McFadden (R)	Edgar; R. Kiess (R)	I. Clinton; Kline (R)	Benjamin K. Focht (R)	Aaron; S. Kreider (R)	John; M. Rose (R)	Edward; S. Brooks (R)	Evan J. Jones (R)	Adam; Wyant (R)	Samuel; A. Kendall (R)	Henry; W. Temple (R)	Milton W. Shreve (IR)	William H. Kirkpatrick (R)	Nathan; L. Strong (R)	Harris; J. Bixler (R)	Stephen; G. Porter (R)	M. Clyde; Kelly (R)	John M. Morin (R)	Guy E. Campbell (D)	33rd	34th	35th	36th	67th (1921–1923)
William; Scott; Vare (R)	George; S. Graham (R)	Harry; C. Ransley (R)	George; W. Edmonds (R)	James J. Connolly (R)	George; Austin; Welsh (R)	George; P. Darrow (R)	Thomas S. Butler (R)	Henry; Winfield; Watson (R)	William; W. Griest (R)	Laurence; H. Watres (R)	John J. Casey (D)	George F. Brumm (R)	William M. Croll (D)	Louis; T. McFadden (R)	Edgar; R. Kiess (R)	Herbert W. Cummings (D)	Edward M. Beers (R)	Frank C. Sites (D)	George M. Wertz (R)	J. Banks; Kurtz (R)	Samuel F. Glatfelter (D)	William; I. Swoope (R)	Samuel; A. Kendall (R)	Henry; W. Temple (R)	Thomas; W. Phillips; Jr. (R)	Nathan; L. Strong (R)	Harris; J. Bixler (R)	Milton; W. Shreve (R)	Everett; Kent (D)	Adam; Wyant (R)	Stephen; G. Porter (R)	M. Clyde; Kelly (R)	John M. Morin (R)	James; M. Magee (R)	Guy E. Campbell (R)	68th (1923–1925)
William; Scott; Vare (R)	George; S. Graham (R)	Harry; C. Ransley (R)	Benjamin; M. Golder (R)	James J. Connolly (R)	George; Austin; Welsh (R)	George; P. Darrow (R)	Thomas S. Butler (R)	Henry; Winfield; Watson (R)	William; W. Griest (R)	Laurence; H. Watres (R)	Edmund N. Carpenter (R)	George F. Brumm (R)	Charles J. Esterly (R)	Louis; T. McFadden (R)	Edgar; R. Kiess (R)	Frederick; W. Magrady (R)	Edward M. Beers (R)	Joshua W. Swartz (R)	Anderson H. Walters (R)	J. Banks; Kurtz (R)	Franklin; Menges (R)	William; I. Swoope (R)	Samuel; A. Kendall (R)	Henry; W. Temple (R)	Thomas; W. Phillips; Jr. (R)	Nathan; L. Strong (R)	Harris; J. Bixler (R)	Milton; W. Shreve (R)	William R. Coyle (R)	Adam; Wyant (R)	Stephen; G. Porter (R)	M. Clyde; Kelly (R)	John M. Morin (R)	James; M. Magee (R)	Guy E. Campbell (R)	69th (1925–1927)
James M. Hazlett (R)	George; S. Graham (R)	Harry; C. Ransley (R)	Benjamin; M. Golder (R)	James J. Connolly (R)	George; Austin; Welsh (R)	George; P. Darrow (R)	Thomas S. Butler (R)	Henry; Winfield; Watson (R)	William; W. Griest (R)	Laurence; H. Watres (R)	John J. Casey (D)	Cyrus M. Palmer (R)	Robert G. Bushong (R)	Louis; T. McFadden (R)	Edgar; R. Kiess (R)	Frederick; W. Magrady (R)	Edward M. Beers (R)	Isaac; H. Doutrich (R)	J. Russell; Leech (R)	J. Banks; Kurtz (R)	Franklin; Menges (R)	J. Mitchell; Chase (R)	Samuel; A. Kendall (R)	Henry; W. Temple (R)	J. Howard; Swick (R)	Nathan; L. Strong (R)	Thomas C. Cochran (R)	Milton; W. Shreve (R)	Everett; Kent (D)	Adam; Wyant (R)	Stephen; G. Porter (R)	M. Clyde; Kelly (R)	John M. Morin (R)	Harry; A. Estep (R)	Guy E. Campbell (R)	70th (1927–1929)
James M. Beck (R)	George; S. Graham (R)	Harry; C. Ransley (R)	Benjamin; M. Golder (R)	James J. Connolly (R)	George; Austin; Welsh (R)	George; P. Darrow (R)	James; Wolfenden (R)	Henry; Winfield; Watson (R)	William; W. Griest (R)	Laurence; H. Watres (R)	John J. Casey (D)	Cyrus M. Palmer (R)	Robert G. Bushong (R)	Louis; T. McFadden (R)	Edgar; R. Kiess (R)	Frederick; W. Magrady (R)	Edward M. Beers (R)	Isaac; H. Doutrich (R)	J. Russell; Leech (R)	J. Banks; Kurtz (R)	Franklin; Menges (R)	J. Mitchell; Chase (R)	Samuel; A. Kendall (R)	Henry; W. Temple (R)	J. Howard; Swick (R)	Nathan; L. Strong (R)	Thomas C. Cochran (R)	Milton; W. Shreve (R)	Everett; Kent (D)	Adam; Wyant (R)	Stephen; G. Porter (R)	M. Clyde; Kelly (R)	John M. Morin (R)	Harry; A. Estep (R)	Guy E. Campbell (R)	70th (1927–1929)
James M. Beck (R)	George; S. Graham (R)	Harry; C. Ransley (R)	Benjamin; M. Golder (R)	James J. Connolly (R)	George; Austin; Welsh (R)	George; P. Darrow (R)	James; Wolfenden (R)	Henry; Winfield; Watson (R)	William; W. Griest (R)	Laurence; H. Watres (R)	John J. Casey (D)	George F. Brumm (R)	Charles J. Esterly (R)	Louis; T. McFadden (R)	Edgar; R. Kiess (R)	Frederick; W. Magrady (R)	Edward M. Beers (R)	Isaac; H. Doutrich (R)	J. Russell; Leech (R)	J. Banks; Kurtz (R)	Franklin; Menges (R)	J. Mitchell; Chase (R)	Samuel; A. Kendall (R)	Henry; W. Temple (R)	J. Howard; Swick (R)	Nathan; L. Strong (R)	Thomas C. Cochran (R)	Milton; W. Shreve (R)	William R. Coyle (R)	Adam; Wyant (R)	Stephen; G. Porter (R)	M. Clyde; Kelly (R)	Patrick J. Sullivan (R)	Harry; A. Estep (R)	Guy E. Campbell (R)	71st (1929–1931)
James M. Beck (R)	George; S. Graham (R)	Harry; C. Ransley (R)	Benjamin; M. Golder (R)	James J. Connolly (R)	George; Austin; Welsh (R)	George; P. Darrow (R)	James; Wolfenden (R)	Henry; Winfield; Watson (R)	J. Roland; Kinzer (R)	Laurence; H. Watres (R)	C. Murray; Turpin (R)	George F. Brumm (R)	Charles J. Esterly (R)	Louis; T. McFadden (R)	Robert F. Rich (R)	Frederick; W. Magrady (R)	Edward M. Beers (R)	Isaac; H. Doutrich (R)	J. Russell; Leech (R)	J. Banks; Kurtz (R)	Franklin; Menges (R)	J. Mitchell; Chase (R)	Samuel; A. Kendall (R)	Henry; W. Temple (R)	J. Howard; Swick (R)	Nathan; L. Strong (R)	Thomas C. Cochran (R)	Milton; W. Shreve (R)	William R. Coyle (R)	Adam; Wyant (R)	Edmund; F. Erk (R)	M. Clyde; Kelly (R)	Patrick J. Sullivan (R)	Harry; A. Estep (R)	Guy E. Campbell (R)	71st (1929–1931)
James M. Beck (R)	George; S. Graham (R)	Harry; C. Ransley (R)	Benjamin; M. Golder (R)	James J. Connolly (R)	George; Austin; Welsh (R)	George; P. Darrow (R)	James; Wolfenden (R)	Henry; Winfield; Watson (R)	J. Roland; Kinzer (R)	Patrick J. Boland (D)	C. Murray; Turpin (R)	George F. Brumm (R)	Norton; Lichten- walner (D)	Louis; T. McFadden (R)	Robert F. Rich (R)	Frederick; W. Magrady (R)	Edward M. Beers (R)	Isaac; H. Doutrich (R)	J. Russell; Leech (R)	J. Banks; Kurtz (R)	Harry L. Haines (D)	J. Mitchell; Chase (R)	Samuel; A. Kendall (R)	Henry; W. Temple (R)	J. Howard; Swick (R)	Nathan; L. Strong (R)	Thomas C. Cochran (R)	Milton; W. Shreve (R)	William R. Coyle (R)	Adam; Wyant (R)	Edmund; F. Erk (R)	M. Clyde; Kelly (R)	Patrick J. Sullivan (R)	Harry; A. Estep (R)	Guy E. Campbell (R)	72nd (1931–1933)
James M. Beck (R)	Edward L. Stokes (R)	Harry; C. Ransley (R)	Benjamin; M. Golder (R)	James J. Connolly (R)	Robert L. Davis (R)	George; P. Darrow (R)	James; Wolfenden (R)	Henry; Winfield; Watson (R)	J. Roland; Kinzer (R)	Patrick J. Boland (D)	C. Murray; Turpin (R)	George F. Brumm (R)	Norton; Lichten- walner (D)	Louis; T. McFadden (R)	Robert F. Rich (R)	Frederick; W. Magrady (R)	Joseph F. Biddle (R)	Isaac; H. Doutrich (R)	Howard W. Stull (R)	J. Banks; Kurtz (R)	Harry L. Haines (D)	J. Mitchell; Chase (R)	Samuel; A. Kendall (R)	Henry; W. Temple (R)	J. Howard; Swick (R)	Nathan; L. Strong (R)	Thomas C. Cochran (R)	Milton; W. Shreve (R)	William R. Coyle (R)	Adam; Wyant (R)	Edmund; F. Erk (R)	M. Clyde; Kelly (R)	Patrick J. Sullivan (R)	Harry; A. Estep (R)	Guy E. Campbell (R)	72nd (1931–1933)

=== 1933–1943: 34 seats ===
Following the 1930 census, the delegation lost two seats.

Congress
73rd
(1933–1935)
74th
(1935–1937)
75th
(1937–1939)
76th
(1939–1941)
77th
(1941–1943)

District																																		Congress
1st	2nd	3rd	4th	5th	6th	7th	8th	9th	10th	11th	12th	13th	14th	15th	16th	17th	18th	19th	20th	21st	22nd	23rd	24th	25th	26th	27th	28th	29th	30th	31st	32nd	33rd	34th	Congress
Harry C. Ransley (R)	James M. Beck (R)	Alfred M. Waldron (R)	George W. Edmonds (R)	James J. Connolly (R)	Edward L. Stokes (R)	George P. Darrow (R)	James; Wolfenden (R)	Henry W. Watson (R)	J. Roland; Kinzer (R)	Patrick; J. Boland (D)	C. Murray; Turpin (R)	George F. Brumm (R)	William; E. Richardson (D)	Louis T. McFadden (R)	Robert; F. Rich (R)	J. William; Ditter (R)	Benjamin; K. Focht (R)	Isaac; H. Doutrich (R)	Thomas C. Cochran (R)	Francis; E. Walter (D)	Harry L. Haines (D)	J. Banks; Kurtz (R)	J. Buell; Snyder (D)	Charles; I. Faddis (D)	J. Howard; Swick (R)	Nathan L. Strong (R)	William M. Berlin (D)	Charles; N. Crosby (D)	J. Twing; Brooks (D)	M. Clyde; Kelly (R)	Michael J. Muldowney (R)	Henry; Ellenbogen (D)	Matthew; A. Dunn (D)	73rd (1933–1935)
Harry C. Ransley (R)	James M. Beck (R)	Alfred M. Waldron (R)	George W. Edmonds (R)	James J. Connolly (R)	Edward L. Stokes (R)	George P. Darrow (R)	James; Wolfenden (R)	Oliver W. Frey (D)	J. Roland; Kinzer (R)	Patrick; J. Boland (D)	C. Murray; Turpin (R)	George F. Brumm (R)	William; E. Richardson (D)	Louis T. McFadden (R)	Robert; F. Rich (R)	J. William; Ditter (R)	Benjamin; K. Focht (R)	Isaac; H. Doutrich (R)	Thomas C. Cochran (R)	Francis; E. Walter (D)	Harry L. Haines (D)	J. Banks; Kurtz (R)	J. Buell; Snyder (D)	Charles; I. Faddis (D)	J. Howard; Swick (R)	Nathan L. Strong (R)	William M. Berlin (D)	Charles; N. Crosby (D)	J. Twing; Brooks (D)	M. Clyde; Kelly (R)	Michael J. Muldowney (R)	Henry; Ellenbogen (D)	Matthew; A. Dunn (D)	73rd (1933–1935)
Harry C. Ransley (R)	William H. Wilson (R)	Clare G. Fenerty (R)	J. Burrwood; Daly (D)	Frank J. G. Dorsey (D)	Michael J. Stack (D)	George P. Darrow (R)	James; Wolfenden (R)	Oliver W. Frey (D)	J. Roland; Kinzer (R)	Patrick; J. Boland (D)	C. Murray; Turpin (R)	James H. Gildea (D)	William; E. Richardson (D)	Charles E. Dietrich (D)	Robert; F. Rich (R)	J. William; Ditter (R)	Benjamin; K. Focht (R)	Isaac; H. Doutrich (R)	Denis J. Driscoll (D)	Francis; E. Walter (D)	Harry L. Haines (D)	Don; Hilary; Gingery (D)	J. Buell; Snyder (D)	Charles; I. Faddis (D)	Charles R. Eckert (D)	Joseph; Anthony; Gray (D)	William M. Berlin (D)	Charles; N. Crosby (D)	J. Twing; Brooks (D)	James L. Quinn (D)	Theodore L. Moritz (D)	Henry; Ellenbogen (D)	Matthew; A. Dunn (D)	74th (1935–1937)
Leon; Sacks (D)	James P. McGranery (D)	Michael J. Bradley (D)	J. Burrwood; Daly (D)	Frank J. G. Dorsey (D)	Michael J. Stack (D)	Ira W. Drew (D)	James; Wolfenden (R)	Oliver W. Frey (D)	J. Roland; Kinzer (R)	Patrick; J. Boland (D)	J. Harold; Flannery (D)	James H. Gildea (D)	Guy L. Moser (D)	Albert G. Rutherford (R)	Robert; F. Rich (R)	J. William; Ditter (R)	Benjamin; K. Focht (R)	Guy J. Swope (D)	Benjamin; Jarrett (R)	Francis; E. Walter (D)	Harry L. Haines (D)	Don; Hilary; Gingery (D)	J. Buell; Snyder (D)	Charles; I. Faddis (D)	Charles R. Eckert (D)	Joseph; Anthony; Gray (D)	Robert G. Allen (D)	Charles; N. Crosby (D)	Peter J. De Muth (D)	James L. Quinn (D)	Herman P. Eberharter (D)	Henry; Ellenbogen (D)	Matthew; A. Dunn (D)	75th (1937–1939)
Leon; Sacks (D)	James P. McGranery (D)	Michael J. Bradley (D)	J. Burrwood; Daly (D)	Fred C. Gartner (R)	Francis J. Myers (D)	George P. Darrow (R)	James; Wolfenden (R)	Charles L. Gerlach (R)	J. Roland; Kinzer (R)	Patrick; J. Boland (D)	J. Harold; Flannery (D)	Ivor D. Fenton (R)	Guy L. Moser (D)	Albert G. Rutherford (R)	Robert; F. Rich (R)	J. William; Ditter (R)	Richard; M. Simpson (R)	John C. Kunkel (R)	Benjamin; Jarrett (R)	Francis; E. Walter (D)	Chester H. Gross (R)	James E. Van Zandt (R)	J. Buell; Snyder (D)	Charles; I. Faddis (D)	Louis E. Graham (R)	Harve; Tibbott (R)	Robert G. Allen (D)	Robert L. Rodgers (R)	Robert J. Corbett (R)	John; McDowell (R)	Herman P. Eberharter (D)	Joseph A. McArdle (D)	Matthew; A. Dunn (D)	76th (1939–1941)
Leon; Sacks (D)	James P. McGranery (D)	Michael J. Bradley (D)	John E. Sheridan (D)	Francis R. Smith (D)	Francis J. Myers (D)	Hugh; Scott (R)	James; Wolfenden (R)	Charles L. Gerlach (R)	J. Roland; Kinzer (R)	Patrick; J. Boland (D)	J. Harold; Flannery (D)	Ivor D. Fenton (R)	Guy L. Moser (D)	Albert G. Rutherford (R)	Robert; F. Rich (R)	J. William; Ditter (R)	Richard; M. Simpson (R)	John C. Kunkel (R)	Benjamin; Jarrett (R)	Francis; E. Walter (D)	Harry L. Haines (D)	James E. Van Zandt (R)	J. Buell; Snyder (D)	Charles; I. Faddis (D)	Louis E. Graham (R)	Harve; Tibbott (R)	Augustine; B. Kelley (D)	Robert L. Rodgers (R)	Thomas E. Scanlon (D)	Samuel A. Weiss (D)	Herman P. Eberharter (D)	Joseph A. McArdle (D)	James A. Wright (D)	77th (1941–1943)
Leon; Sacks (D)	James P. McGranery (D)	Michael J. Bradley (D)	John E. Sheridan (D)	Francis R. Smith (D)	Francis J. Myers (D)	Hugh; Scott (R)	James; Wolfenden (R)	Charles L. Gerlach (R)	J. Roland; Kinzer (R)	Veronica G. Boland (D)	Thomas B. Miller (R)	Ivor D. Fenton (R)	Guy L. Moser (D)	Albert G. Rutherford (R)	Robert; F. Rich (R)	J. William; Ditter (R)	Richard; M. Simpson (R)	John C. Kunkel (R)	Benjamin; Jarrett (R)	Francis; E. Walter (D)	Harry L. Haines (D)	James E. Van Zandt (R)	J. Buell; Snyder (D)	Charles; I. Faddis (D)	Louis E. Graham (R)	Harve; Tibbott (R)	Augustine; B. Kelley (D)	Robert L. Rodgers (R)	Thomas E. Scanlon (D)	Samuel A. Weiss (D)	Herman P. Eberharter (D)	Elmer J. Holland (D)	James A. Wright (D)	77th (1941–1943)

=== 1943–1953: 33 seats ===
Following the 1940 census, the delegation lost one seat. For the 78th Congress, there were 32 districts and 1 at-large seat. Starting with the 79th Congress, however, there were 33 districts.

Congress
78th
(1943–1945)
79th
(1945–1947)
80th
(1947–1949)
81st
(1949–1951)
82nd
(1951–1953)

District																																	Congress
1st	2nd	3rd	4th	5th	6th	7th	8th	9th	10th	11th	12th	13th	14th	15th	16th	17th	18th	19th	20th	21st	22nd	23rd	24th	25th	26th	27th	28th	29th	30th	31st	32nd	At-large	Congress
James A. Gallagher (R)	James P. McGranery (D)	Michael; J. Bradley (D)	John E. Sheridan (D)	C. Frederick; Pracht (R)	Francis J. Myers (D)	Hugh; Scott (R)	James; Wolfenden (R)	Charles; L. Gerlach (R)	J. Roland; Kinzer (R)	John W. Murphy (D)	Thomas; B. Miller (R)	Ivor D. Fenton (R)	Daniel K. Hoch (D)	Wilson; D. Gillette (R)	Thomas; E. Scanlon (D)	J. William; Ditter (R)	Richard M. Simpson (R)	John C. Kunkel (R)	Leon H. Gavin (R)	Francis E. Walter (D)	Chester H. Gross (R)	James E. Van Zandt (R)	J. Buell; Snyder (D)	Grant; Furlong (D)	Louis E. Graham (R)	Harve; Tibbott (R)	Augustine; B. Kelley (D)	Robert L. Rodgers (R)	Samuel; A. Weiss (D)	Herman P. Eberharter (D)	James A. Wright (D)	William I. Troutman (R)	78th (1943–1945)
James A. Gallagher (R)	Joseph M. Pratt (R)	Michael; J. Bradley (D)	John E. Sheridan (D)	C. Frederick; Pracht (R)	Francis J. Myers (D)	Hugh; Scott (R)	James; Wolfenden (R)	Charles; L. Gerlach (R)	J. Roland; Kinzer (R)	John W. Murphy (D)	Thomas; B. Miller (R)	Ivor D. Fenton (R)	Daniel K. Hoch (D)	Wilson; D. Gillette (R)	Thomas; E. Scanlon (D)	J. William; Ditter (R)	Richard M. Simpson (R)	John C. Kunkel (R)	Leon H. Gavin (R)	Francis E. Walter (D)	Chester H. Gross (R)	James E. Van Zandt (R)	J. Buell; Snyder (D)	Grant; Furlong (D)	Louis E. Graham (R)	Harve; Tibbott (R)	Augustine; B. Kelley (D)	Robert L. Rodgers (R)	Samuel; A. Weiss (D)	Herman P. Eberharter (D)	James A. Wright (D)	William I. Troutman (R)	78th (1943–1945)
James A. Gallagher (R)	Joseph M. Pratt (R)	Michael; J. Bradley (D)	John E. Sheridan (D)	C. Frederick; Pracht (R)	Francis J. Myers (D)	Hugh; Scott (R)	James; Wolfenden (R)	Charles; L. Gerlach (R)	J. Roland; Kinzer (R)	John W. Murphy (D)	Thomas; B. Miller (R)	Ivor D. Fenton (R)	Daniel K. Hoch (D)	Wilson; D. Gillette (R)	Thomas; E. Scanlon (D)	J. William; Ditter (R)	Richard M. Simpson (R)	John C. Kunkel (R)	Leon H. Gavin (R)	Francis E. Walter (D)	Chester H. Gross (R)	James E. Van Zandt (R)	J. Buell; Snyder (D)	Grant; Furlong (D)	Louis E. Graham (R)	Harve; Tibbott (R)	Augustine; B. Kelley (D)	Robert L. Rodgers (R)	Samuel; A. Weiss (D)	Herman P. Eberharter (D)	James A. Wright (D)	33rd	78th (1943–1945)
Bill; Barrett (D)	William T. Granahan (D)	Michael; J. Bradley (D)	John E. Sheridan (D)	William J. Green Jr. (D)	Herbert J. McGlinchey (D)	James; Wolfenden (R)	Charles L. Gerlach (R)	J. Roland; Kinzer (R)	John W. Murphy (D)	Daniel; Flood (D)	Ivor D. Fenton (R)	Daniel K. Hoch (D)	Wilson; D. Gillette (R)	Robert; F. Rich (R)	Samuel K. McConnell; Jr. (R)	Richard; M. Simpson (R)	John C. Kunkel (R)	Leon H. Gavin (R)	Francis E. Walter (D)	Chester; H. Gross (R)	D. Emmert; Brumbaugh (R)	J. Buell Snyder (D)	Thomas; E. Morgan (D)	Louis E. Graham (R)	Harve; Tibbott (R)	Augustine; B. Kelley (D)	Robert L. Rodgers (R)	Howard E. Campbell (R)	Robert J. Corbett (R)	James G. Fulton (R)	Herman P. Eberharter (D)	Samuel A. Weiss (D)	79th (1945–1947)
Bill; Barrett (D)	William T. Granahan (D)	Michael; J. Bradley (D)	John E. Sheridan (D)	William J. Green Jr. (D)	Herbert J. McGlinchey (D)	James; Wolfenden (R)	Charles L. Gerlach (R)	J. Roland; Kinzer (R)	John W. Murphy (D)	Daniel; Flood (D)	Ivor D. Fenton (R)	Daniel K. Hoch (D)	Wilson; D. Gillette (R)	Robert; F. Rich (R)	Samuel K. McConnell; Jr. (R)	Richard; M. Simpson (R)	John C. Kunkel (R)	Leon H. Gavin (R)	Francis E. Walter (D)	Chester; H. Gross (R)	D. Emmert; Brumbaugh (R)	Carl Henry; Hoffman (R)	Thomas; E. Morgan (D)	Louis E. Graham (R)	Harve; Tibbott (R)	Augustine; B. Kelley (D)	Robert L. Rodgers (R)	Howard E. Campbell (R)	Robert J. Corbett (R)	James G. Fulton (R)	Herman P. Eberharter (D)	Samuel A. Weiss (D)	79th (1945–1947)
James A. Gallagher (R)	Robert N. McGarvey (R)	Hardie; Scott (R)	Franklin J. Maloney (R)	George W. Sarbacher Jr. (R)	Hugh; Scott (R)	E. Wallace; Chadwick (R)	Charles L. Gerlach (R)	Paul B. Dague (R)	James P. Scoblick (R)	Mitchell; Jenkins (R)	Ivor D. Fenton (R)	Frederick A. Muhlenberg (R)	Wilson; D. Gillette (R)	Robert; F. Rich (R)	Samuel K. McConnell; Jr. (R)	Richard; M. Simpson (R)	John C. Kunkel (R)	Leon H. Gavin (R)	Francis E. Walter (D)	Chester; H. Gross (R)	James E. Van Zandt (R)	William J. Crow (R)	Thomas; E. Morgan (D)	Louis E. Graham (R)	Harve; Tibbott (R)	Augustine; B. Kelley (D)	Carroll D. Kearns (R)	John; McDowell (R)	Robert J. Corbett (R)	James G. Fulton (R)	Herman P. Eberharter (D)	Frank; Buchanan (D)	80th (1947–1949)
Bill; Barrett (D)	William T. Granahan (D)	Hardie; Scott (R)	Earl; Chudoff (D)	William J. Green Jr. (D)	Hugh; Scott (R)	Benjamin F. James (R)	Franklin H. Lichtenwalter (R)	Paul B. Dague (R)	Harry P. O'Neill (D)	Daniel; Flood (D)	Ivor D. Fenton (R)	George M. Rhodes (D)	Wilson; D. Gillette (R)	Robert; F. Rich (R)	Samuel K. McConnell; Jr. (R)	Richard; M. Simpson (R)	John C. Kunkel (R)	Leon H. Gavin (R)	Francis E. Walter (D)	James F. Lind (D)	James E. Van Zandt (R)	Anthony; Cavalcante (D)	Thomas; E. Morgan (D)	Louis E. Graham (R)	Robert L. Coffey (D)	Augustine; B. Kelley (D)	Carroll D. Kearns (R)	Harry J. Davenport (D)	Robert J. Corbett (R)	James G. Fulton (R)	Herman P. Eberharter (D)	Frank; Buchanan (D)	81st (1949–1951)
Bill; Barrett (D)	William T. Granahan (D)	Hardie; Scott (R)	Earl; Chudoff (D)	William J. Green Jr. (D)	Hugh; Scott (R)	Benjamin F. James (R)	Albert C. Vaughn (R)	Paul B. Dague (R)	Harry P. O'Neill (D)	Daniel; Flood (D)	Ivor D. Fenton (R)	George M. Rhodes (D)	Wilson; D. Gillette (R)	Alvin; Bush (R)	Samuel K. McConnell; Jr. (R)	Richard; M. Simpson (R)	Walter M. Mumma (R)	Leon H. Gavin (R)	Francis E. Walter (D)	James F. Lind (D)	James E. Van Zandt (R)	Edward L. Sittler Jr. (R)	Thomas; E. Morgan (D)	Louis E. Graham (R)	John P. Saylor (R)	Augustine; B. Kelley (D)	Carroll D. Kearns (R)	Harmar D. Denny Jr. (R)	Robert J. Corbett (R)	James G. Fulton (R)	Herman P. Eberharter (D)	Frank; Buchanan (D)	82nd (1951–1953)
Bill; Barrett (D)	William T. Granahan (D)	Hardie; Scott (R)	Earl; Chudoff (D)	William J. Green Jr. (D)	Hugh; Scott (R)	Benjamin F. James (R)	Karl C. King (R)	Paul B. Dague (R)	Harry P. O'Neill (D)	Daniel; Flood (D)	Ivor D. Fenton (R)	George M. Rhodes (D)	Joseph L. Carrigg (R)	Alvin; Bush (R)	Samuel K. McConnell; Jr. (R)	Richard; M. Simpson (R)	Walter M. Mumma (R)	Leon H. Gavin (R)	Francis E. Walter (D)	James F. Lind (D)	James E. Van Zandt (R)	Edward L. Sittler Jr. (R)	Thomas; E. Morgan (D)	Louis E. Graham (R)	John P. Saylor (R)	Augustine; B. Kelley (D)	Carroll D. Kearns (R)	Harmar D. Denny Jr. (R)	Robert J. Corbett (R)	James G. Fulton (R)	Herman P. Eberharter (D)	Vera; Buchanan (D)	82nd (1951–1953)

=== 1953–1963: 30 seats ===
Following the 1950 census, the delegation lost three seats.

Congress
83rd
(1953–1955)
84th
(1955–1957)
85th
(1957–1959)
86th
(1959–1961)
87th
(1961–1963)

District																														Congress
1st	2nd	3rd	4th	5th	6th	7th	8th	9th	10th	11th	12th	13th	14th	15th	16th	17th	18th	19th	20th	21st	22nd	23rd	24th	25th	26th	27th	28th	29th	30th	Congress
Bill; Barrett (D)	William T. Granahan (D)	James; A. Byrne (D)	Earl; Chudoff (D)	William; J. Green; Jr. (D)	Hugh; Scott (R)	Benjamin; F. James (R)	Karl; C. King (R)	Paul; B. Dague (R)	Joseph; L. Carrigg (R)	Edward; Bonin (R)	Ivor; D. Fenton (R)	Samuel K. McConnell; Jr. (R)	George; M. Rhodes (D)	Francis; E. Walter (D)	Walter; M. Mumma (R)	Alvin; Bush (R)	Richard; M. Simpson (R)	S. Walter; Stauffer (R)	James; E. Van; Zandt (R)	Augustine; B. Kelley (D)	John; P. Saylor (R)	Leon; H. Gavin (R)	Carroll; D. Kearns (R)	Louis E. Graham (R)	Thomas; E. Morgan (D)	James; G. Fulton (R)	Herman P. Eberharter (D)	Robert; J. Corbett (R)	Vera; Buchanan (D)	83rd (1953–1955)
Bill; Barrett (D)	William T. Granahan (D)	James; A. Byrne (D)	Earl; Chudoff (D)	William; J. Green; Jr. (D)	Hugh; Scott (R)	Benjamin; F. James (R)	Karl; C. King (R)	Paul; B. Dague (R)	Joseph; L. Carrigg (R)	Daniel; Flood (D)	Ivor; D. Fenton (R)	Samuel K. McConnell; Jr. (R)	George; M. Rhodes (D)	Francis; E. Walter (D)	Walter; M. Mumma (R)	Alvin; Bush (R)	Richard; M. Simpson (R)	James M. Quigley (D)	James; E. Van; Zandt (R)	Augustine; B. Kelley (D)	John; P. Saylor (R)	Leon; H. Gavin (R)	Carroll; D. Kearns (R)	Frank; M. Clark (D)	Thomas; E. Morgan (D)	James; G. Fulton (R)	Herman P. Eberharter (D)	Robert; J. Corbett (R)	Vera; Buchanan (D)	84th (1955–1957)
Bill; Barrett (D)	Kathryn; E. Granahan (D)	James; A. Byrne (D)	Earl; Chudoff (D)	William; J. Green; Jr. (D)	Hugh; Scott (R)	Benjamin; F. James (R)	Willard; S. Curtin (R)	Paul; B. Dague (R)	Joseph; L. Carrigg (R)	Daniel; Flood (D)	Ivor; D. Fenton (R)	Samuel K. McConnell; Jr. (R)	George; M. Rhodes (D)	Francis; E. Walter (D)	Walter; M. Mumma (R)	Alvin; Bush (R)	Richard; M. Simpson (R)	S. Walter; Stauffer (R)	James; E. Van; Zandt (R)	Augustine; B. Kelley (D)	John; P. Saylor (R)	Leon; H. Gavin (R)	Carroll; D. Kearns (R)	Frank; M. Clark (D)	Thomas; E. Morgan (D)	James; G. Fulton (R)	Herman P. Eberharter (D)	Robert; J. Corbett (R)	Elmer; J. Holland (D)	85th (1957–1959)
Bill; Barrett (D)	Kathryn; E. Granahan (D)	James; A. Byrne (D)	Robert; N. C. Nix Sr. (D)	William; J. Green; Jr. (D)	Herman; Toll (D)	William; H. Milliken; Jr. (R)	Willard; S. Curtin (R)	Paul; B. Dague (R)	Stanley A. Prokop (D)	Daniel; Flood (D)	Ivor; D. Fenton (R)	John A. Lafore; Jr. (R)	George; M. Rhodes (D)	Francis; E. Walter (D)	Walter; M. Mumma (R)	Alvin; Bush (R)	Richard; M. Simpson (R)	James M. Quigley (D)	James; E. Van; Zandt (R)	John; Herman; Dent (D)	John; P. Saylor (R)	Leon; H. Gavin (R)	Carroll; D. Kearns (R)	Frank; M. Clark (D)	Thomas; E. Morgan (D)	James; G. Fulton (R)	William; S. Moorhead (D)	Robert; J. Corbett (R)	Elmer; J. Holland (D)	86th (1959–1961)
Bill; Barrett (D)	Kathryn; E. Granahan (D)	James; A. Byrne (D)	Robert; N. C. Nix Sr. (D)	William; J. Green; Jr. (D)	Herman; Toll (D)	William; H. Milliken; Jr. (R)	Willard; S. Curtin (R)	Paul; B. Dague (R)	Stanley A. Prokop (D)	Daniel; Flood (D)	Ivor; D. Fenton (R)	John A. Lafore; Jr. (R)	George; M. Rhodes (D)	Francis; E. Walter (D)	Walter; M. Mumma (R)	Alvin; Bush (R)	Douglas H. Elliott (R)	James M. Quigley (D)	James; E. Van; Zandt (R)	John; Herman; Dent (D)	John; P. Saylor (R)	Leon; H. Gavin (R)	Carroll; D. Kearns (R)	Frank; M. Clark (D)	Thomas; E. Morgan (D)	James; G. Fulton (R)	William; S. Moorhead (D)	Robert; J. Corbett (R)	Elmer; J. Holland (D)	86th (1959–1961)
Bill; Barrett (D)	Kathryn; E. Granahan (D)	James; A. Byrne (D)	Robert; N. C. Nix Sr. (D)	William; J. Green; Jr. (D)	Herman; Toll (D)	William; H. Milliken; Jr. (R)	Willard; S. Curtin (R)	Paul; B. Dague (R)	William; Scranton (R)	Daniel; Flood (D)	Ivor; D. Fenton (R)	Richard; Schweiker (R)	George; M. Rhodes (D)	Francis; E. Walter (D)	Walter; M. Mumma (R)	Herman T. Schneebeli (R)	J. Irving; Whalley (R)	George A. Goodling (R)	James; E. Van; Zandt (R)	John; Herman; Dent (D)	John; P. Saylor (R)	Leon; H. Gavin (R)	Carroll; D. Kearns (R)	Frank; M. Clark (D)	Thomas; E. Morgan (D)	James; G. Fulton (R)	William; S. Moorhead (D)	Robert; J. Corbett (R)	Elmer; J. Holland (D)	87th (1961–1963)

=== 1963–1973: 27 seats ===
Following the 1960 census, the delegation lost three seats.

Congress
88th
(1963–1965)
89th
(1965–1967)
90th
(1967–1969)
91st
(1969–1971)
92nd
(1971–1973)

District																											Congress
1st	2nd	3rd	4th	5th	6th	7th	8th	9th	10th	11th	12th	13th	14th	15th	16th	17th	18th	19th	20th	21st	22nd	23rd	24th	25th	26th	27th	Congress
Bill; Barrett (D)	Robert; Nix (D)	James; A. Byrne (D)	Herman; Toll (D)	William J. Green Jr. (D)	George; M. Rhodes (D)	William H. Milliken Jr. (R)	Willard; S. Curtin (R)	Paul B. Dague (R)	Joseph; M. McDade (R)	Daniel; Flood (D)	J. Irving; Whalley (R)	Richard; Schweiker (R)	William S. Moorhead (D)	Fred B. Rooney (D)	John C. Kunkel (R)	Herman T. Schneebeli (R)	Bob; Corbett (R)	George A. Goodling (R)	Elmer J. Holland (D)	John; Herman; Dent (D)	John; P. Saylor (R)	Albert; W. Johnson (R)	James D. Weaver (R)	Frank; M. Clark (D)	Thomas; E. Morgan (D)	James G. Fulton (R)	88th (1963–1965)
Bill; Barrett (D)	Robert; Nix (D)	James; A. Byrne (D)	Herman; Toll (D)	Bill; Green; III (D)	George; M. Rhodes (D)	George; Watkins (R)	Willard; S. Curtin (R)	Paul B. Dague (R)	Joseph; M. McDade (R)	Daniel; Flood (D)	J. Irving; Whalley (R)	Richard; Schweiker (R)	William S. Moorhead (D)	Fred B. Rooney (D)	John C. Kunkel (R)	Herman T. Schneebeli (R)	Bob; Corbett (R)	Nathaniel; Craley (D)	Elmer J. Holland (D)	John; Herman; Dent (D)	John; P. Saylor (R)	Albert; W. Johnson (R)	Joe; Vigorito (D)	Frank; M. Clark (D)	Thomas; E. Morgan (D)	James G. Fulton (R)	89th (1965–1967)
Bill; Barrett (D)	Robert; Nix (D)	James; A. Byrne (D)	Joshua; Eilberg (D)	Bill; Green; III (D)	George; M. Rhodes (D)	Lawrence G. Williams (R)	Edward; Biester (R)	George; Watkins (R)	Joseph; M. McDade (R)	Daniel; Flood (D)	J. Irving; Whalley (R)	Richard; Schweiker (R)	William S. Moorhead (D)	Fred B. Rooney (D)	Edwin D. Eshleman (R)	Herman T. Schneebeli (R)	Bob; Corbett (R)	George A. Goodling (R)	Elmer J. Holland (D)	John; Herman; Dent (D)	John; P. Saylor (R)	Albert; W. Johnson (R)	Joe; Vigorito (D)	Frank; M. Clark (D)	Thomas; E. Morgan (D)	James G. Fulton (R)	90th (1967–1969)
Bill; Barrett (D)	Robert; Nix (D)	James; A. Byrne (D)	Joshua; Eilberg (D)	Bill; Green; III (D)	Gus; Yatron (D)	Lawrence G. Williams (R)	Edward; Biester (R)	George; Watkins (R)	Joseph; M. McDade (R)	Daniel; Flood (D)	J. Irving; Whalley (R)	Lawrence; Coughlin (R)	William S. Moorhead (D)	Fred B. Rooney (D)	Edwin D. Eshleman (R)	Herman T. Schneebeli (R)	Bob; Corbett (R)	George A. Goodling (R)	Joseph M. Gaydos (D)	John; Herman; Dent (D)	John; P. Saylor (R)	Albert; W. Johnson (R)	Joe; Vigorito (D)	Frank; M. Clark (D)	Thomas; E. Morgan (D)	James G. Fulton (R)	91st (1969–1971)
Bill; Barrett (D)	Robert; Nix (D)	James; A. Byrne (D)	Joshua; Eilberg (D)	Bill; Green; III (D)	Gus; Yatron (D)	Lawrence G. Williams (R)	Edward; Biester (R)	John H. Ware III (R)	Joseph; M. McDade (R)	Daniel; Flood (D)	J. Irving; Whalley (R)	Lawrence; Coughlin (R)	William S. Moorhead (D)	Fred B. Rooney (D)	Edwin D. Eshleman (R)	Herman T. Schneebeli (R)	Bob; Corbett (R)	George A. Goodling (R)	Joseph M. Gaydos (D)	John; Herman; Dent (D)	John; P. Saylor (R)	Albert; W. Johnson (R)	Joe; Vigorito (D)	Frank; M. Clark (D)	Thomas; E. Morgan (D)	William S. Conover (R)	92nd (1971–1973)

=== 1973–1983: 25 seats ===
Following the 1970 census, the delegation lost two seats.

Congress
93rd
(1973–1975)
94th
(1975–1977)
95th
(1977–1979)
96th
(1979–1981)
97th
(1981–1983)

District																									Congress
1st	2nd	3rd	4th	5th	6th	7th	8th	9th	10th	11th	12th	13th	14th	15th	16th	17th	18th	19th	20th	21st	22nd	23rd	24th	25th	Congress
Bill; Barrett (D)	Robert; Nix (D)	Bill; Green III (D)	Joshua; Eilberg (D)	John H. Ware III (R)	Gus; Yatron (D)	Lawrence G. Williams (R)	Edward; Biester (R)	Bud; Shuster (R)	Joseph; M. McDade (R)	Daniel; Flood (D)	John P. Saylor (R)	Lawrence; Coughlin (R)	William; S. Moorhead (D)	Fred B. Rooney (D)	Edwin D. Eshleman (R)	Herman; T. Schneebeli (R)	John; Heinz (R)	George A. Goodling (R)	Joseph; M. Gaydos (D)	John; Herman; Dent (D)	Thomas; E. Morgan (D)	Albert W. Johnson (R)	Joe; Vigorito (D)	Frank M. Clark (D)	93rd (1973–1975)
Bill; Barrett (D)	Robert; Nix (D)	Bill; Green III (D)	Joshua; Eilberg (D)	Dick; Schulze (R)	Gus; Yatron (D)	Bob; Edgar (D)	Edward; Biester (R)	Bud; Shuster (R)	Joseph; M. McDade (R)	Daniel; Flood (D)	John; Murtha (D)	Lawrence; Coughlin (R)	William; S. Moorhead (D)	Fred B. Rooney (D)	Edwin D. Eshleman (R)	Herman; T. Schneebeli (R)	John; Heinz (R)	Bill; Goodling (R)	Joseph; M. Gaydos (D)	John; Herman; Dent (D)	Thomas; E. Morgan (D)	Albert W. Johnson (R)	Joe; Vigorito (D)	Gary A. Myers (R)	94th (1975–1977)
Ozzie; Myers (D)	Robert; Nix (D)	Raymond; Lederer (D)	Joshua; Eilberg (D)	Dick; Schulze (R)	Gus; Yatron (D)	Bob; Edgar (D)	Peter H. Kostmayer (D)	Bud; Shuster (R)	Joseph; M. McDade (R)	Daniel; Flood (D)	John; Murtha (D)	Lawrence; Coughlin (R)	William; S. Moorhead (D)	Fred B. Rooney (D)	Bob; Walker (R)	Allen E. Ertel (D)	Doug; Walgren (D)	Bill; Goodling (R)	Joseph; M. Gaydos (D)	John; Herman; Dent (D)	Austin; Murphy (D)	Joseph S. Ammerman (D)	Marc L. Marks (R)	Gary A. Myers (R)	95th (1977–1979)
Ozzie; Myers (D)	William; Gray (D)	Raymond; Lederer (D)	Charles F. Dougherty (R)	Dick; Schulze (R)	Gus; Yatron (D)	Bob; Edgar (D)	Peter H. Kostmayer (D)	Bud; Shuster (R)	Joseph; M. McDade (R)	Daniel; Flood (D)	John; Murtha (D)	Lawrence; Coughlin (R)	William; S. Moorhead (D)	Don; Ritter (R)	Bob; Walker (R)	Allen E. Ertel (D)	Doug; Walgren (D)	Bill; Goodling (R)	Joseph; M. Gaydos (D)	Donald; A. Bailey (D)	Austin; Murphy (D)	William; Clinger (R)	Marc L. Marks (R)	Eugene; Atkinson (D)	96th (1979–1981)
Tom; Foglietta (D)	William; Gray (D)	Joe; Smith (D)	Charles F. Dougherty (R)	Dick; Schulze (R)	Gus; Yatron (D)	Bob; Edgar (D)	James K. Coyne III (R)	Bud; Shuster (R)	Joseph; M. McDade (R)	Jim; Nelligan (R)	John; Murtha (D)	Lawrence; Coughlin (R)	William J. Coyne (D)	Don; Ritter (R)	Bob; Walker (R)	Allen E. Ertel (D)	Doug; Walgren (D)	Bill; Goodling (R)	Joseph; M. Gaydos (D)	Donald; A. Bailey (D)	Austin; Murphy (D)	William; Clinger (R)	Marc L. Marks (R)	Eugene; Atkinson (D)	97th (1981–1983)
Tom; Foglietta (D)	William; Gray (D)	Joe; Smith (D)	Charles F. Dougherty (R)	Dick; Schulze (R)	Gus; Yatron (D)	Bob; Edgar (D)	James K. Coyne III (R)	Bud; Shuster (R)	Joseph; M. McDade (R)	Jim; Nelligan (R)	John; Murtha (D)	Lawrence; Coughlin (R)	William J. Coyne (D)	Don; Ritter (R)	Bob; Walker (R)	Allen E. Ertel (D)	Doug; Walgren (D)	Bill; Goodling (R)	Joseph; M. Gaydos (D)	Donald; A. Bailey (D)	Austin; Murphy (D)	William; Clinger (R)	Marc L. Marks (R)	Eugene; Atkinson (R)	97th (1981–1983)

=== 1983–1993: 23 seats ===
Following the 1980 census, the delegation lost two seats.

Congress	District																							Congress
Congress	1st	2nd	3rd	4th	5th	6th	7th	8th	9th	10th	11th	12th	13th	14th	15th	16th	17th	18th	19th	20th	21st	22nd	23rd	Congress
98th (1983–1985)	Tom; Foglietta (D)	William; Gray (D)	Bob; Borski (D)	Joe; Kolter (D)	Dick; Schulze (R)	Gus; Yatron (D)	Bob; Edgar (D)	Peter H. Kostmayer (D)	Bud; Shuster (R)	Joseph; M. McDade (R)	Frank; Harrison (D)	John; Murtha (D)	Lawrence; Coughlin (R)	William; J. Coyne (D)	Don; Ritter (R)	Bob; Walker (R)	George; Gekas (R)	Doug; Walgren (D)	Bill; Goodling (R)	Joseph; M. Gaydos (D)	Tom; Ridge (R)	Austin; Murphy (D)	William; Clinger (R)	98th (1983–1985)
99th (1985–1987)	Tom; Foglietta (D)	William; Gray (D)	Bob; Borski (D)	Joe; Kolter (D)	Dick; Schulze (R)	Gus; Yatron (D)	Bob; Edgar (D)	Peter H. Kostmayer (D)	Bud; Shuster (R)	Joseph; M. McDade (R)	Paul; Kanjorski (D)	John; Murtha (D)	Lawrence; Coughlin (R)	William; J. Coyne (D)	Don; Ritter (R)	Bob; Walker (R)	George; Gekas (R)	Doug; Walgren (D)	Bill; Goodling (R)	Joseph; M. Gaydos (D)	Tom; Ridge (R)	Austin; Murphy (D)	William; Clinger (R)	99th (1985–1987)
100th (1987–1989)	Tom; Foglietta (D)	William; Gray (D)	Bob; Borski (D)	Joe; Kolter (D)	Dick; Schulze (R)	Gus; Yatron (D)	Curt; Weldon (R)	Peter H. Kostmayer (D)	Bud; Shuster (R)	Joseph; M. McDade (R)	Paul; Kanjorski (D)	John; Murtha (D)	Lawrence; Coughlin (R)	William; J. Coyne (D)	Don; Ritter (R)	Bob; Walker (R)	George; Gekas (R)	Doug; Walgren (D)	Bill; Goodling (R)	Joseph; M. Gaydos (D)	Tom; Ridge (R)	Austin; Murphy (D)	William; Clinger (R)	100th (1987–1989)
101st (1989–1991)	Tom; Foglietta (D)	William; Gray (D)	Bob; Borski (D)	Joe; Kolter (D)	Dick; Schulze (R)	Gus; Yatron (D)	Curt; Weldon (R)	Peter H. Kostmayer (D)	Bud; Shuster (R)	Joseph; M. McDade (R)	Paul; Kanjorski (D)	John; Murtha (D)	Lawrence; Coughlin (R)	William; J. Coyne (D)	Don; Ritter (R)	Bob; Walker (R)	George; Gekas (R)	Doug; Walgren (D)	Bill; Goodling (R)	Joseph; M. Gaydos (D)	Tom; Ridge (R)	Austin; Murphy (D)	William; Clinger (R)	101st (1989–1991)
102nd (1991–1993)	Tom; Foglietta (D)	William; Gray (D)	Bob; Borski (D)	Joe; Kolter (D)	Dick; Schulze (R)	Gus; Yatron (D)	Curt; Weldon (R)	Peter H. Kostmayer (D)	Bud; Shuster (R)	Joseph; M. McDade (R)	Paul; Kanjorski (D)	John; Murtha (D)	Lawrence; Coughlin (R)	William; J. Coyne (D)	Don; Ritter (R)	Bob; Walker (R)	George; Gekas (R)	Rick; Santorum (R)	Bill; Goodling (R)	Joseph; M. Gaydos (D)	Tom; Ridge (R)	Austin; Murphy (D)	William; Clinger (R)	102nd (1991–1993)

=== 1993–2003: 21 seats ===
Following the 1990 census, the delegation lost two seats.

Congress	District																					Congress
Congress	1st	2nd	3rd	4th	5th	6th	7th	8th	9th	10th	11th	12th	13th	14th	15th	16th	17th	18th	19th	20th	21st	Congress
103rd (1993–1995)	Tom; Foglietta (D)	Lucien; Blackwell (D)	Bob; Borski (D)	Ron; Klink (D)	William; Clinger (R)	Tim; Holden (D)	Curt; Weldon (R)	Jim; Greenwood (R)	Bud; Shuster (R)	Joseph; M. McDade (R)	Paul; Kanjorski (D)	John; Murtha (D)	Marjorie; Margolies (D)	William J. Coyne (D)	Paul; McHale (D)	Bob; Walker (R)	George; Gekas (R)	Rick; Santorum (R)	Bill; Goodling (R)	Austin; Murphy (D)	Tom; Ridge (R)	103rd (1993–1995)
104th (1995–1997)	Tom; Foglietta (D)	Chaka; Fattah (D)	Bob; Borski (D)	Ron; Klink (D)	William; Clinger (R)	Tim; Holden (D)	Curt; Weldon (R)	Jim; Greenwood (R)	Bud; Shuster (R)	Joseph; M. McDade (R)	Paul; Kanjorski (D)	John; Murtha (D)	Jon D. Fox (R)	William J. Coyne (D)	Paul; McHale (D)	Bob; Walker (R)	George; Gekas (R)	Mike; Doyle (D)	Bill; Goodling (R)	Frank; Mascara (D)	Phil; English (R)	104th (1995–1997)
105th (1997–1999)	Tom; Foglietta (D)	Chaka; Fattah (D)	Bob; Borski (D)	Ron; Klink (D)	John; Peterson (R)	Tim; Holden (D)	Curt; Weldon (R)	Jim; Greenwood (R)	Bud; Shuster (R)	Joseph; M. McDade (R)	Paul; Kanjorski (D)	John; Murtha (D)	Jon D. Fox (R)	William J. Coyne (D)	Paul; McHale (D)	Joe; Pitts (R)	George; Gekas (R)	Mike; Doyle (D)	Bill; Goodling (R)	Frank; Mascara (D)	Phil; English (R)	105th (1997–1999)
105th (1997–1999)	Bob; Brady (D)	Chaka; Fattah (D)	Bob; Borski (D)	Ron; Klink (D)	John; Peterson (R)	Tim; Holden (D)	Curt; Weldon (R)	Jim; Greenwood (R)	Bud; Shuster (R)	Joseph; M. McDade (R)	Paul; Kanjorski (D)	John; Murtha (D)	Jon D. Fox (R)	William J. Coyne (D)	Paul; McHale (D)	Joe; Pitts (R)	George; Gekas (R)	Mike; Doyle (D)	Bill; Goodling (R)	Frank; Mascara (D)	Phil; English (R)	105th (1997–1999)
106th (1999–2001)	Bob; Brady (D)	Chaka; Fattah (D)	Bob; Borski (D)	Ron; Klink (D)	John; Peterson (R)	Tim; Holden (D)	Curt; Weldon (R)	Jim; Greenwood (R)	Bud; Shuster (R)	Don; Sherwood (R)	Paul; Kanjorski (D)	John; Murtha (D)	Joe; Hoeffel (D)	William J. Coyne (D)	Pat; Toomey (R)	Joe; Pitts (R)	George; Gekas (R)	Mike; Doyle (D)	Bill; Goodling (R)	Frank; Mascara (D)	Phil; English (R)	106th (1999–2001)
107th (2001–2003)	Bob; Brady (D)	Chaka; Fattah (D)	Bob; Borski (D)	Melissa; Hart (R)	John; Peterson (R)	Tim; Holden (D)	Curt; Weldon (R)	Jim; Greenwood (R)	Bud; Shuster (R)	Don; Sherwood (R)	Paul; Kanjorski (D)	John; Murtha (D)	Joe; Hoeffel (D)	William J. Coyne (D)	Pat; Toomey (R)	Joe; Pitts (R)	George; Gekas (R)	Mike; Doyle (D)	Todd; Platts (R)	Frank; Mascara (D)	Phil; English (R)	107th (2001–2003)

=== 2003–2013: 19 seats ===
Following the 2000 census, the delegation lost two seats.

Congress	District																			Congress
Congress	1st	2nd	3rd	4th	5th	6th	7th	8th	9th	10th	11th	12th	13th	14th	15th	16th	17th	18th	19th	Congress
108th (2003–2005)	Bob; Brady (D)	Chaka; Fattah (D)	Phil; English (R)	Melissa; Hart (R)	John; Peterson (R)	Jim; Gerlach (R)	Curt; Weldon (R)	Jim Green- wood (R)	Bill; Shuster (R)	Don; Sherwood (R)	Paul; Kanjorski (D)	John; Murtha (D)	Joe; Hoeffel (D)	Mike; Doyle (D)	Pat; Toomey (R)	Joe; Pitts (R)	Tim; Holden (D)	Tim; Murphy (R)	Todd; Platts (R)	108th (2003–2005)
109th (2005–2007)	Bob; Brady (D)	Chaka; Fattah (D)	Phil; English (R)	Melissa; Hart (R)	John; Peterson (R)	Jim; Gerlach (R)	Curt; Weldon (R)	Mike; Fitzpatrick (R)	Bill; Shuster (R)	Don; Sherwood (R)	Paul; Kanjorski (D)	John; Murtha (D)	Allyson; Schwartz (D)	Mike; Doyle (D)	Charlie; Dent (R)	Joe; Pitts (R)	Tim; Holden (D)	Tim; Murphy (R)	Todd; Platts (R)	109th (2005–2007)
110th (2007–2009)	Bob; Brady (D)	Chaka; Fattah (D)	Phil; English (R)	Jason; Altmire (D)	John; Peterson (R)	Jim; Gerlach (R)	Joe; Sestak (D)	Patrick; Murphy (D)	Bill; Shuster (R)	Chris; Carney (D)	Paul; Kanjorski (D)	John; Murtha (D)	Allyson; Schwartz (D)	Mike; Doyle (D)	Charlie; Dent (R)	Joe; Pitts (R)	Tim; Holden (D)	Tim; Murphy (R)	Todd; Platts (R)	110th (2007–2009)
111th (2009–2011)	Bob; Brady (D)	Chaka; Fattah (D)	Kathy Dahl- kemper (D)	Jason; Altmire (D)	Glenn; Thompson (R)	Jim; Gerlach (R)	Joe; Sestak (D)	Patrick; Murphy (D)	Bill; Shuster (R)	Chris; Carney (D)	Paul; Kanjorski (D)	John; Murtha (D)	Allyson; Schwartz (D)	Mike; Doyle (D)	Charlie; Dent (R)	Joe; Pitts (R)	Tim; Holden (D)	Tim; Murphy (R)	Todd; Platts (R)	111th (2009–2011)
111th (2009–2011)	Bob; Brady (D)	Chaka; Fattah (D)	Kathy Dahl- kemper (D)	Jason; Altmire (D)	Glenn; Thompson (R)	Jim; Gerlach (R)	Joe; Sestak (D)	Patrick; Murphy (D)	Bill; Shuster (R)	Chris; Carney (D)	Paul; Kanjorski (D)	Mark; Critz (D)	Allyson; Schwartz (D)	Mike; Doyle (D)	Charlie; Dent (R)	Joe; Pitts (R)	Tim; Holden (D)	Tim; Murphy (R)	Todd; Platts (R)	111th (2009–2011)
112th (2011–2013)	Bob; Brady (D)	Chaka; Fattah (D)	Mike; Kelly (R)	Jason; Altmire (D)	Glenn; Thompson (R)	Jim; Gerlach (R)	Pat; Meehan (R)	Mike; Fitzpatrick (R)	Bill; Shuster (R)	Tom; Marino (R)	Lou; Barletta (R)	Mark; Critz (D)	Allyson; Schwartz (D)	Mike; Doyle (D)	Charlie; Dent (R)	Joe; Pitts (R)	Tim; Holden (D)	Tim; Murphy (R)	Todd; Platts (R)	112th (2011–2013)

=== 2013–2023: 18 seats ===
Following the 2010 census, the delegation lost one seat. With court-ordered redistricting in Pennsylvania on February 19, 2018, none of the members of congress who served in 115th Congress and were re-elected are in the same district in the 116th Congress.

Congress	District																	
Congress	1st	2nd	3rd	4th	5th	6th	7th	8th	9th	10th	11th	12th	13th	14th	15th	16th	17th	18th
113th (2013–2015)	Bob; Brady (D)	Chaka; Fattah (D)	Mike; Kelly (R)	Scott; Perry (R)	Glenn; Thompson (R)	Jim; Gerlach (R)	Pat; Meehan (R)	Mike; Fitzpatrick (R)	Bill; Shuster (R)	Tom; Marino (R)	Lou; Barletta (R)	Keith; Rothfus (R)	Allyson; Schwartz (D)	Mike; Doyle (D)	Charlie; Dent (R)	Joe; Pitts (R)	Matt; Cartwright (D)	Tim; Murphy (R)
114th (2015–2017)	Bob; Brady (D)	Dwight; Evans (D)	Mike; Kelly (R)	Scott; Perry (R)	Glenn; Thompson (R)	Ryan; Costello (R)	Pat; Meehan (R)	Mike; Fitzpatrick (R)	Bill; Shuster (R)	Tom; Marino (R)	Lou; Barletta (R)	Keith; Rothfus (R)	Brendan; Boyle (D)	Mike; Doyle (D)	Charlie; Dent (R)	Joe; Pitts (R)	Matt; Cartwright (D)	Tim; Murphy (R)
115th (2017–2019)	Bob; Brady (D)	Dwight; Evans (D)	Mike; Kelly (R)	Scott; Perry (R)	Glenn; Thompson (R)	Ryan; Costello (R)	Pat; Meehan (R)	Brian; Fitzpatrick (R)	Bill; Shuster (R)	Tom; Marino (R)	Lou; Barletta (R)	Keith; Rothfus (R)	Brendan; Boyle (D)	Mike; Doyle (D)	Charlie; Dent (R)	Lloyd; Smucker (R)	Matt; Cartwright (D)	Tim; Murphy (R)
115th (2017–2019)	Bob; Brady (D)	Dwight; Evans (D)	Mike; Kelly (R)	Scott; Perry (R)	Glenn; Thompson (R)	Ryan; Costello (R)	Mary Gay; Scanlon (D)	Brian; Fitzpatrick (R)	Bill; Shuster (R)	Tom; Marino (R)	Lou; Barletta (R)	Keith; Rothfus (R)	Brendan; Boyle (D)	Mike; Doyle (D)	Susan; Wild (D)	Lloyd; Smucker (R)	Matt; Cartwright (D)	Conor; Lamb (D)
116th (2019–2021)	Brian; Fitzpatrick (R)	Brendan; Boyle (D)	Dwight; Evans (D)	Madeleine; Dean (D)	Mary Gay; Scanlon (D)	Chrissy; Houlahan (D)	Susan; Wild (D)	Matt; Cartwright (D)	Dan; Meuser (R)	Scott; Perry (R)	Lloyd; Smucker (R)	Tom; Marino (R)	John; Joyce (R)	Guy; Reschenthaler (R)	Glenn; Thompson (R)	Mike; Kelly (R)	Conor; Lamb (D)	Mike; Doyle (D)
116th (2019–2021)	Brian; Fitzpatrick (R)	Brendan; Boyle (D)	Dwight; Evans (D)	Madeleine; Dean (D)	Mary Gay; Scanlon (D)	Chrissy; Houlahan (D)	Susan; Wild (D)	Matt; Cartwright (D)	Dan; Meuser (R)	Scott; Perry (R)	Lloyd; Smucker (R)	Fred; Keller (R)	John; Joyce (R)	Guy; Reschenthaler (R)	Glenn; Thompson (R)	Mike; Kelly (R)	Conor; Lamb (D)	Mike; Doyle (D)
117th (2021–2023)	Brian; Fitzpatrick (R)	Brendan; Boyle (D)	Dwight; Evans (D)	Madeleine; Dean (D)	Mary Gay; Scanlon (D)	Chrissy; Houlahan (D)	Susan; Wild (D)	Matt; Cartwright (D)	Dan; Meuser (R)	Scott; Perry (R)	Lloyd; Smucker (R)	Fred; Keller (R)	John; Joyce (R)	Guy; Reschenthaler (R)	Glenn; Thompson (R)	Mike; Kelly (R)	Conor; Lamb (D)	Mike; Doyle (D)

=== 2023–present: 17 seats ===
Following the 2020 census, the delegation lost one seat.

Congress
118th
(2023–2025)
119th
(2025–2027)
120th
(2027–2029)

District
1st	2nd	3rd	4th	5th	6th	7th	8th	9th	10th	11th	12th	13th	14th	15th	16th	17th
Brian; Fitzpatrick (R)	Brendan; Boyle (D)	Dwight; Evans (D)	Madeleine; Dean (D)	Mary Gay; Scanlon (D)	Chrissy; Houlahan (D)	Susan; Wild (D)	Matt; Cartwright (D)	Dan; Meuser (R)	Scott; Perry (R)	Lloyd; Smucker (R)	Summer; Lee (D)	John; Joyce (R)	Guy; Reschenthaler (R)	Glenn; Thompson (R)	Mike; Kelly (R)	Chris; Deluzio (D)
Brian; Fitzpatrick (R)	Brendan; Boyle (D)	Dwight; Evans (D)	Madeleine; Dean (D)	Mary Gay; Scanlon (D)	Chrissy; Houlahan (D)	Ryan; Mackenzie (R)	Rob; Bresnahan (R)	Dan; Meuser (R)	Scott; Perry (R)	Lloyd; Smucker (R)	Summer; Lee (D)	John; Joyce (R)	Guy; Reschenthaler (R)	Glenn; Thompson (R)	Mike; Kelly (R)	Chris; Deluzio (D)
Bob; Harvie (D)	Brendan; Boyle (D)	Chris; Rabb (D)	Madeleine; Dean (D)	Mary Gay; Scanlon (D)	Chrissy; Houlahan (D)	Bob; Brooks (D)	Paige; Cognetti (D)	Dan; Meuser (R)	Janelle; Stelson (D)	Lloyd; Smucker (R)	Summer; Lee (D)	John; Joyce (R)	Guy; Reschenthaler (R)	Glenn; Thompson (R)	Mike; Kelly (R)	Chris; Deluzio (D)

== United States Senate ==
Current U.S. senators from Pennsylvania
Pennsylvania CPVI (2025): R+1	Class I senator	Class III senator
Pennsylvania CPVI (2025): R+1	Dave McCormick (Junior senator) (Pittsburgh)	John Fetterman (Senior senator) (Braddock)
Party	Republican	Democratic
Incumbent since	January 3, 2025	January 3, 2023

Class I senator	Congress	Class III senator
William Maclay (AA)	1st (1789–1791)	Robert Morris (PA)
vacant	2nd (1791–1793)	Robert Morris (PA)
Albert Gallatin (AA)	3rd (1793–1795)	Robert Morris (PA)
James Ross (PA)	3rd (1793–1795)	Robert Morris (PA)
James Ross (F)	4th (1795–1797)	William Bingham (F)
James Ross (F)	5th (1797–1799)	William Bingham (F)
James Ross (F)	6th (1799–1801)	William Bingham (F)
James Ross (F)	7th (1801–1803)	Peter Muhlenberg (DR)
James Ross (F)	7th (1801–1803)	George Logan (DR)
Samuel Maclay (DR)	8th (1803–1805)	George Logan (DR)
Samuel Maclay (DR)	9th (1805–1807)	George Logan (DR)
Samuel Maclay (DR)	10th (1807–1809)	Andrew Gregg (DR)
Michael Leib (DR)	10th (1807–1809)	Andrew Gregg (DR)
Michael Leib (DR)	11th (1809–1811)	Andrew Gregg (DR)
Michael Leib (DR)	12th (1811–1813)	Andrew Gregg (DR)
Michael Leib (DR)	13th (1813–1815)	Abner Lacock (DR)
Jonathan Roberts (DR)	13th (1813–1815)	Abner Lacock (DR)
Jonathan Roberts (DR)	14th (1815–1817)	Abner Lacock (DR)
Jonathan Roberts (DR)	15th (1817–1819)	Abner Lacock (DR)
Jonathan Roberts (DR)	16th (1819–1821)	Walter Lowrie (DR)
William Findlay (DR)	17th (1821–1823)	Walter Lowrie (DR)
William Findlay (DR)	18th (1823–1825)	Walter Lowrie (DR)
William Findlay (J)	19th (1825–1827)	William Marks (NR)
Isaac D. Barnard (J)	20th (1827–1829)	William Marks (NR)
Isaac D. Barnard (J)	21st (1829–1831)	William Marks (NR)
Isaac D. Barnard (J)	22nd (1831–1833)	William Wilkins (J)
George M. Dallas (J)	22nd (1831–1833)	William Wilkins (J)
Samuel McKean (J)	23rd (1833–1835)	William Wilkins (J)
Samuel McKean (J)	23rd (1833–1835)	James Buchanan (J)
Samuel McKean (J)	24th (1835–1837)	James Buchanan (J)
Samuel McKean (D)	25th (1837–1839)	James Buchanan (D)
Daniel Sturgeon (D)	26th (1839–1841)	James Buchanan (D)
Daniel Sturgeon (D)	27th (1841–1843)	James Buchanan (D)
Daniel Sturgeon (D)	28th (1843–1845)	James Buchanan (D)
Daniel Sturgeon (D)	29th (1845–1847)	James Buchanan (D)
Daniel Sturgeon (D)	29th (1845–1847)	Simon Cameron (D)
Daniel Sturgeon (D)	30th (1847–1849)	Simon Cameron (D)
Daniel Sturgeon (D)	31st (1849–1851)	James Cooper (W)
Richard Brodhead (D)	32nd (1851–1853)	James Cooper (W)
Richard Brodhead (D)	33rd (1853–1855)	James Cooper (W)
Richard Brodhead (D)	34th (1855–1857)	William Bigler (D)
Simon Cameron (R)	35th (1857–1859)	William Bigler (D)
Simon Cameron (R)	36th (1859–1861)	William Bigler (D)
Simon Cameron (R)	37th (1861–1863)	Edgar Cowan (R)
David Wilmot (R)	37th (1861–1863)	Edgar Cowan (R)
Charles R. Buckalew (D)	38th (1863–1865)	Edgar Cowan (R)
Charles R. Buckalew (D)	39th (1865–1867)	Edgar Cowan (R)
Charles R. Buckalew (D)	40th (1867–1869)	Simon Cameron (R)
John Scott (R)	41st (1869–1871)	Simon Cameron (R)
John Scott (R)	42nd (1871–1873)	Simon Cameron (R)
John Scott (R)	43rd (1873–1875)	Simon Cameron (R)
William A. Wallace (D)	44th (1875–1877)	Simon Cameron (R)
William A. Wallace (D)	45th (1877–1879)	Simon Cameron (R)
William A. Wallace (D)	45th (1877–1879)	J. Donald Cameron (R)
William A. Wallace (D)	46th (1879–1881)	J. Donald Cameron (R)
John I. Mitchell (R)	47th (1881–1883)	J. Donald Cameron (R)
John I. Mitchell (R)	48th (1883–1885)	J. Donald Cameron (R)
John I. Mitchell (R)	49th (1885–1887)	J. Donald Cameron (R)
Matthew Quay (R)	50th (1887–1889)	J. Donald Cameron (R)
Matthew Quay (R)	51st (1889–1891)	J. Donald Cameron (R)
Matthew Quay (R)	52nd (1891–1893)	J. Donald Cameron (R)
Matthew Quay (R)	53rd (1893–1895)	J. Donald Cameron (R)
Matthew Quay (R)	54th (1895–1897)	J. Donald Cameron (R)
Matthew Quay (R)	55th (1897–1899)	Boies Penrose (R)
vacant	56th (1899–1901)	Boies Penrose (R)
Matthew Quay (R)	56th (1899–1901)	Boies Penrose (R)
Matthew Quay (R)	57th (1901–1903)	Boies Penrose (R)
Matthew Quay (R)	58th (1903–1905)	Boies Penrose (R)
Philander C. Knox (R)	58th (1903–1905)	Boies Penrose (R)
Philander C. Knox (R)	59th (1905–1907)	Boies Penrose (R)
Philander C. Knox (R)	60th (1907–1909)	Boies Penrose (R)
George T. Oliver (R)	61st (1909–1911)	Boies Penrose (R)
George T. Oliver (R)	62nd (1911–1913)	Boies Penrose (R)
George T. Oliver (R)	63rd (1913–1915)	Boies Penrose (R)
George T. Oliver (R)	64th (1915–1917)	Boies Penrose (R)
Philander C. Knox (R)	65th (1917–1919)	Boies Penrose (R)
Philander C. Knox (R)	66th (1919–1921)	Boies Penrose (R)
William E. Crow (R)	67th (1921–1923)	Boies Penrose (R)
David A. Reed (R)	67th (1921–1923)	George W. Pepper (R)
David A. Reed (R)	68th (1923–1925)	George W. Pepper (R)
David A. Reed (R)	69th (1925–1927)	George W. Pepper (R)
David A. Reed (R)	70th (1927–1929)	William Scott Vare (R)
David A. Reed (R)	71st (1929–1931)	William Scott Vare (R)
David A. Reed (R)	71st (1929–1931)	Joseph R. Grundy (R)
David A. Reed (R)	71st (1929–1931)	James J. Davis (R)
David A. Reed (R)	72nd (1931–1933)	James J. Davis (R)
David A. Reed (R)	73rd (1933–1935)	James J. Davis (R)
Joseph F. Guffey (D)	74th (1935–1937)	James J. Davis (R)
Joseph F. Guffey (D)	75th (1937–1939)	James J. Davis (R)
Joseph F. Guffey (D)	76th (1939–1941)	James J. Davis (R)
Joseph F. Guffey (D)	77th (1941–1943)	James J. Davis (R)
Joseph F. Guffey (D)	78th (1943–1945)	James J. Davis (R)
Joseph F. Guffey (D)	79th (1945–1947)	Francis J. Myers (D)
Edward Martin (R)	80th (1947–1949)	Francis J. Myers (D)
Edward Martin (R)	81st (1949–1951)	Francis J. Myers (D)
Edward Martin (R)	82nd (1951–1953)	James H. Duff (R)
Edward Martin (R)	83rd (1953–1955)	James H. Duff (R)
Edward Martin (R)	84th (1955–1957)	James H. Duff (R)
Edward Martin (R)	85th (1957–1959)	Joseph S. Clark Jr. (D)
Hugh Scott (R)	86th (1959–1961)	Joseph S. Clark Jr. (D)
Hugh Scott (R)	87th (1961–1963)	Joseph S. Clark Jr. (D)
Hugh Scott (R)	88th (1963–1965)	Joseph S. Clark Jr. (D)
Hugh Scott (R)	89th (1965–1967)	Joseph S. Clark Jr. (D)
Hugh Scott (R)	90th (1967–1969)	Joseph S. Clark Jr. (D)
Hugh Scott (R)	91st (1969–1971)	Richard Schweiker (R)
Hugh Scott (R)	92nd (1971–1973)	Richard Schweiker (R)
Hugh Scott (R)	93rd (1973–1975)	Richard Schweiker (R)
Hugh Scott (R)	94th (1975–1977)	Richard Schweiker (R)
John Heinz (R)	95th (1977–1979)	Richard Schweiker (R)
John Heinz (R)	96th (1979–1981)	Richard Schweiker (R)
John Heinz (R)	97th (1981–1983)	Arlen Specter (R)
John Heinz (R)	98th (1983–1985)	Arlen Specter (R)
John Heinz (R)	99th (1985–1987)	Arlen Specter (R)
John Heinz (R)	100th (1987–1989)	Arlen Specter (R)
John Heinz (R)	101st (1989–1991)	Arlen Specter (R)
John Heinz (R)	102nd (1991–1993)	Arlen Specter (R)
Harris Wofford (D)	102nd (1991–1993)	Arlen Specter (R)
Harris Wofford (D)	103rd (1993–1995)	Arlen Specter (R)
Rick Santorum (R)	104th (1995–1997)	Arlen Specter (R)
Rick Santorum (R)	105th (1997–1999)	Arlen Specter (R)
Rick Santorum (R)	106th (1999–2001)	Arlen Specter (R)
Rick Santorum (R)	107th (2001–2003)	Arlen Specter (R)
Rick Santorum (R)	108th (2003–2005)	Arlen Specter (R)
Rick Santorum (R)	109th (2005–2007)	Arlen Specter (R)
Bob Casey Jr. (D)	110th (2007–2009)	Arlen Specter (R)
Bob Casey Jr. (D)	111th (2009–2011)	Arlen Specter (D)
Bob Casey Jr. (D)	112th (2011–2013)	Pat Toomey (R)
Bob Casey Jr. (D)	113th (2013–2015)	Pat Toomey (R)
Bob Casey Jr. (D)	114th (2015–2017)	Pat Toomey (R)
Bob Casey Jr. (D)	115th (2017–2019)	Pat Toomey (R)
Bob Casey Jr. (D)	116th (2019–2021)	Pat Toomey (R)
Bob Casey Jr. (D)	117th (2021–2023)	Pat Toomey (R)
Bob Casey Jr. (D)	118th (2023–2025)	John Fetterman (D)
Dave McCormick (R)	119th (2025–2027)	John Fetterman (D)
Dave McCormick (R)	120th (2027–2029)	John Fetterman (D)

== Key ==
Anti-Administration (AA)
Anti-Masonic (A-M)
Democratic (D)
Democratic-Republican (DR)
Federalist (F)
Pro-Administration (PA)
Free Soil (FS)
Greenback (GB)
Independent Democrat (ID)
Independent Republican (IR)
Jacksonian (J)
Know Nothing (KN)
National Republican (NR)
Opposition Northern (O)
Progressive (Bull Moose) (Prog)
Republican (R)
Whig (W)

== See also ==
- List of United States congressional districts
- Pennsylvania's congressional districts
- Political party strength in Pennsylvania
