= List of United States representatives from Pennsylvania =

The following is a list of United States representatives from the commonwealth of Pennsylvania. For chronological tables of members of both houses of the United States Congress from the state (through the present day), see Pennsylvania's congressional delegations. The list has been updated periodically to reflect changes in membership; current entries are for members of the 119th Congress.

== Current members ==
Listed below are the incumbent members of the Pennsylvania U.S. House delegation to the 119th Congress, updated on January 3, 2025:

- 1st district: Brian Fitzpatrick (R) (since 2017)
- 2nd district: Brendan Boyle (D) (since 2015)
- 3rd district: Dwight Evans (D) (since 2016)
- 4th district: Madeleine Dean (D) (since 2019)
- 5th district: Mary Gay Scanlon (D) (since 2018)
- 6th district: Chrissy Houlahan (D) (since 2019)
- 7th district: Ryan Mackenzie (R) (since 2025)
- 8th district: Rob Bresnahan (R) (since 2025)
- 9th district: Dan Meuser (R) (since 2019)
- 10th district: Scott Perry (R) (since 2013)
- 11th district: Lloyd Smucker (R) (since 2017)
- 12th district: Summer Lee (D) (since 2023)
- 13th district: John Joyce (R) (since 2019)
- 14th district: Guy Reschenthaler (R) (since 2019)
- 15th district: Glenn Thompson (R) (since 2009)
- 16th district: Mike Kelly (R) (since 2011)
- 17th district: Chris Deluzio (D) (since 2023)

== List of members ==
Member	Party	District	Years	Electoral history
Ernest F. Acheson	Republican	24th	March 4, 1895 – March 4, 1909	Lost re-election.
Ephraim L. Acker	Democratic	6th	March 4, 1871 – March 4, 1873	Lost re-election.
Robert Adams Jr.	Republican	2nd	December 19, 1893 – June 1, 1906	Died.
William Addams	Jacksonian	7th	March 4, 1825 – March 4, 1829	Lost re-election.
John A. Ahl	Democratic	16th	March 4, 1857 – March 4, 1859	Retired.
William D. B. Ainey	Republican	14th	November 7, 1911 – March 4, 1915	Retired.
Charles Albright	Republican	At-large	March 4, 1873 – March 4, 1875	Retired.
Robert G. Allen	Democratic	28th	January 3, 1937 – January 3, 1941	Retired.
James Allison Jr.	Democratic-Republican	16th	March 4, 1823 – August 26, 1825	Resigned.
John Allison	Whig	20th	March 4, 1851 – March 4, 1853	Lost re-election.
John Allison	Opposition	23rd	March 4, 1855 – March 4, 1857	Retired.
Robert Allison	Anti-Masonic	12th	March 4, 1831 – March 4, 1833	Retired.
Jason Altmire	Democratic	4th	January 3, 2007 – January 3, 2013	Redistricted and lost renomination.
Lemuel Amerman	Democratic	11th	March 4, 1891 – March 4, 1893	Lost re-election.
Joseph S. Ammerman	Democratic	23rd	January 3, 1977 – January 3, 1979	Lost re-election.
Sydenham E. Ancona	Democratic	8th	March 4, 1861 – March 4, 1867	Lost re-election.
Isaac Anderson	Democratic-Republican	3rd	March 4, 1803 – March 4, 1807	Retired.
Samuel Anderson	Anti-Jacksonian	4th	March 4, 1827 – March 4, 1829	Retired and returned to Pennsylvania House of Representatives.
William Anderson	Democratic-Republican	1st	March 4, 1809 – March 4, 1815	
William Anderson	Democratic-Republican	1st	March 4, 1817 – March 4, 1819	
Joseph B. Anthony	Jacksonian	16th	March 4, 1833 – March 4, 1837	
James Armstrong	Pro-Administration	At-large	March 4, 1793 – March 4, 1795	Retired.
William H. Armstrong	Republican	18th	March 4, 1869 – March 4, 1871	Lost re-election.
William C. Arnold	Republican	28th	March 4, 1895 – March 4, 1899	Lost re-election.
Michael W. Ash	Jacksonian	3rd	March 4, 1835 – March 4, 1837	Retired.
Eugene Atkinson	Democratic	25th	January 3, 1979 – October 14, 1981	Switched parties.
Eugene Atkinson	Republican	25th	October 14, 1981 – January 3, 1983	Redistricted and lost re-election.
Louis E. Atkinson	Republican	18th	March 4, 1883 – March 4, 1893	Withdrew from re-election campaign and retired.
Elijah Babbitt	Republican	25th	March 4, 1859 – March 4, 1863	Retired.
Reuben K. Bachman	Democratic	10th	March 4, 1879 – March 4, 1881	Retired.
Donald A. Bailey	Democratic	21st	January 3, 1979 – January 3, 1983	Redistricted and lost renomination.
Joseph Bailey	Democratic	16th	March 4, 1861 – March 4, 1863	
Joseph Bailey	Democratic	15th	March 4, 1863 – March 4, 1865	
Warren W. Bailey	Democratic	19th	March 4, 1913 – March 4, 1917	
Henry Baldwin	Democratic-Republican	14th	March 4, 1817 – May 8, 1822	Resigned.
John Banks	Anti-Masonic	18th	March 4, 1831 – March 4, 1833	Resigned to become the judge of the Berks judicial district.
John Banks	Anti-Masonic	24th	March 4, 1833 – March 31, 1836	Resigned to become the judge of the Berks judicial district.
Laird H. Barber	Democratic	8th	March 4, 1899 – March 4, 1901	
Andrew J. Barchfeld	Republican	32nd	March 4, 1905 – March 4, 1917	
Charles F. Barclay	Republican	21st	March 4, 1907 – March 4, 1911	
David Barclay	Democratic	24th	March 4, 1855 – March 4, 1857	
David Bard	Democratic-Republican	10th	March 4, 1795 – March 4, 1799	
David Bard	Democratic-Republican	4th	March 4, 1803 – March 4, 1813	
David Bard	Democratic-Republican	9th	March 4, 1813 – March 12, 1815	
Abraham A. Barker	Republican	17th	March 4, 1865 – March 4, 1867	
Lou Barletta	Republican	11th	January 3, 2011 – January 3, 2019	Retired.
Stephen Barlow	Jacksonian	18th	March 4, 1827 – March 4, 1829	
Charles Augustus Barnitz	Anti-Masonic	11th	March 4, 1833 – March 4, 1835	
Samuel F. Barr	Republican	14th	March 4, 1881 – March 4, 1885	
William A. Barrett	Democratic	1st	January 3, 1945 – January 3, 1947	
William A. Barrett	Democratic	1st	January 3, 1949 – April 12, 1976	Died.
Arthur L. Bates	Republican	26th	March 4, 1901 – March 4, 1903	
Arthur L. Bates	Republican	25th	March 4, 1903 – March 4, 1913	
Thomas M. Bayne	Republican	23rd	March 4, 1877 – March 4, 1891	
Joseph G. Beale	Republican	27th	March 4, 1907 – March 4, 1909	
C. William Beales	Republican	20th	March 4, 1915 – March 4, 1917	
William Beatty	Democratic	23rd	March 4, 1837 – March 4, 1841	
Andrew Beaumont	Jacksonian	15th	March 4, 1833 – March 4, 1837	
James M. Beck	Republican	1st	November 8, 1927 – March 4, 1933	
James M. Beck	Republican	2nd	March 4, 1933 – September 30, 1934	
Edward M. Beers	Republican	18th	March 4, 1923 – April 21, 1932	Died.
Henry W. Beeson	Democratic	20th	May 31, 1841 – March 4, 1843	
Frank E. Beltzhoover	Democratic	19th	March 4, 1879 – March 4, 1883	
Frank E. Beltzhoover	Democratic	19th	March 4, 1891 – March 4, 1895	
George J. Benner	Democratic	19th	March 4, 1897 – March 4, 1899	
William M. Berlin	Democratic	28th	March 4, 1933 – January 3, 1937	
Earl H. Beshlin	Democratic	28th	November 6, 1917 – March 4, 1919	
Thomas M. Bibighaus	Whig	14th	March 4, 1851 – March 4, 1853	
Charles J. Biddle	Democratic	2nd	July 2, 1861 – March 4, 1863	
Joseph F. Biddle	Republican	18th	November 8, 1932 – March 4, 1933	
Richard Biddle	Anti-Masonic	22nd	March 4, 1837 – July 21, 1840	Resigned.
Benjamin A. Bidlack	Democratic	15th	March 4, 1841 – March 4, 1843	
Benjamin A. Bidlack	Democratic	11th	March 4, 1843 – March 4, 1845	
James S. Biery	Republican	6th	March 4, 1873 – March 4, 1875	
Edward G. Biester Jr.	Republican	8th	January 3, 1967 – January 3, 1977	
Alexander Billmeyer	Democratic	17th	November 4, 1902 – March 4, 1903	
Henry H. Bingham	Republican	1st	March 4, 1879 – March 22, 1912	Died.
Horace Binney	Anti-Jacksonian	2nd	March 4, 1833 – March 4, 1835	
Harris J. Bixler	Republican	28th	March 4, 1921 – March 4, 1927	
Henry Black	Whig	18th	June 28, 1841 – November 28, 1841	Died.
James Black	Jacksonian	13th	December 5, 1836 – March 4, 1837	
James Black	Democratic	16th	March 4, 1843 – March 4, 1847	
Lucien E. Blackwell	Democratic	2nd	November 5, 1991 – January 3, 1995	
Samuel S. Blair	Republican	18th	March 4, 1859 – March 4, 1863	
John Blanchard	Whig	17th	March 4, 1845 – March 4, 1849	
Andrew Boden	Democratic-Republican	5th	March 4, 1817 – March 4, 1821	
Patrick J. Boland	Democratic	11th	March 4, 1931 – May 18, 1942	Died.
Veronica G. Boland	Democratic	11th	November 3, 1942 – January 3, 1943	
Edward J. Bonin	Republican	11th	January 3, 1953 – January 3, 1955	
Robert A. Borski Jr.	Democratic	3rd	January 3, 1983 – January 3, 2003	
Thomas Boude	Federalist	7th	March 4, 1801 – March 4, 1803	
Franklin Bound	Republican	14th	March 4, 1885 – March 4, 1889	
Charles C. Bowman	Republican	11th	March 4, 1911 – December 12, 1912	Seat declared vacant.
Benjamin M. Boyer	Democratic	6th	March 4, 1865 – March 4, 1869	
Brendan F. Boyle	Democratic	13th	January 3, 2015 – January 3, 2019	Redistricted.
Brendan F. Boyle	Democratic	2nd	January 3, 2019 – present	Incumbent
Charles E. Boyle	Democratic	21st	March 4, 1883 – March 4, 1887	
Henry M. Brackenridge	Whig	22nd	October 13, 1840 – March 4, 1841	
Michael J. Bradley	Democratic	3rd	January 3, 1937 – January 3, 1947	
Samuel C. Bradshaw	Opposition	7th	March 4, 1855 – March 4, 1857	
Robert A. Brady	Democratic	1st	May 19, 1998 – January 3, 2019	Retired.
Jasper E. Brady	Whig	16th	March 4, 1847 – March 4, 1849	
Samuel M. Brainerd	Republican	27th	March 4, 1883 – March 4, 1885	
Samuel Breck	Federalist	1st	March 4, 1823 – March 4, 1825	
Rob Bresnahan	Republican	8th	January 3, 2025 – present	Incumbent
Samuel A. Bridges	Democratic	6th	March 6, 1848 – March 4, 1849	
Samuel A. Bridges	Democratic	7th	March 4, 1853 – March 4, 1855	
Samuel A. Bridges	Democratic	10th	March 4, 1877 – March 4, 1879	
John Brisbin	Democratic	11th	January 13, 1851 – March 4, 1851	
Andrew R. Brodbeck	Democratic	20th	March 4, 1913 – March 4, 1915	
Andrew R. Brodbeck	Democratic	20th	March 4, 1917 – March 4, 1919	
J. Davis Brodhead	Democratic	26th	March 4, 1907 – March 4, 1909	
Richard Brodhead	Democratic	10th	March 4, 1843 – March 4, 1849	
Edward S. Brooks	Republican	20th	March 4, 1919 – March 4, 1923	
J. Twing Brooks	Democratic	30th	March 4, 1933 – January 3, 1937	
Jacob Broom	Know Nothing	4th	March 4, 1855 – March 4, 1857	
John M. Broomall	Republican	7th	March 4, 1863 – March 4, 1869	
Marriott Brosius	Republican	10th	March 4, 1889 – March 16, 1901	Died.
Charles Brown	Democratic	1st	March 4, 1841 – March 4, 1843	
Charles Brown	Democratic	3rd	March 4, 1847 – March 4, 1849	
James W. Brown	Independent Republican	32nd	March 4, 1903 – March 4, 1905	
Jeremiah Brown	Whig	4th	March 4, 1841 – March 4, 1843	
Jeremiah Brown	Whig	8th	March 4, 1843 – March 4, 1845	
John Brown	Democratic-Republican	9th	March 4, 1821 – March 4, 1823	
John Brown	Democratic-Republican	12th	March 4, 1823 – March 4, 1825	
Robert Brown	Democratic-Republican	4th	December 4, 1798 – March 4, 1803	
Robert Brown	Democratic-Republican	2nd	March 4, 1803 – March 4, 1813	
Robert Brown	Democratic-Republican	6th	March 4, 1813 – March 4, 1815	
William W. Brown	Republican	16th	March 4, 1883 – March 4, 1887	
D. Emmert Brumbaugh	Republican	23rd	November 2, 1943 – January 3, 1945	
D. Emmert Brumbaugh	Republican	22nd	January 3, 1945 – January 3, 1947	
Charles N. Brumm	Greenback	13th	March 4, 1881 – March 4, 1885	
Charles N. Brumm	Republican	13th	March 4, 1885 – March 4, 1889	
Charles N. Brumm	Republican	13th	March 4, 1895 – March 4, 1899	
Charles N. Brumm	Republican	12th	November 6, 1906 – January 4, 1909	Resigned after being elected judge of the court of common pleas of Schuylkill County, Pennsylvania.
George F. Brumm	Republican	13th	March 4, 1923 – March 4, 1927	
George F. Brumm	Republican	13th	March 4, 1929 – May 29, 1934	Died.
David B. Brunner	Democratic	9th	March 4, 1889 – March 4, 1893	
Andrew Buchanan	Jacksonian	20th	March 4, 1835 – March 4, 1837	
Andrew Buchanan	Democratic	20th	March 4, 1837 – March 4, 1839	
Frank Buchanan	Democratic	33rd	May 21, 1946 – April 27, 1951	Died.
James Buchanan	Federalist	3rd	March 4, 1821 – March 4, 1823	
James Buchanan	Federalist	4th	March 4, 1823 – March 4, 1825	
James Buchanan	Jacksonian	4th	March 4, 1825 – March 4, 1831	
Vera Buchanan	Democratic	33rd	July 24, 1951 – January 3, 1953	Died.
Vera Buchanan	Democratic	30th	January 3, 1953 – November 26, 1955	Died.
John C. Bucher	Jacksonian	6th	March 4, 1831 – March 4, 1833	
Charles R. Buckalew	Democratic	11th	March 4, 1887 – March 4, 1889	
Charles R. Buckalew	Democratic	17th	March 4, 1889 – March 4, 1891	
Joseph Buffington	Whig	24th	March 4, 1843 – March 4, 1847	
Frank C. Bunnell	Republican	13th	December 24, 1872 – March 4, 1873	
Frank C. Bunnell	Republican	15th	March 4, 1885 – March 4, 1889	
George Burd	Anti-Jacksonian	13th	March 4, 1831 – March 4, 1833	
George Burd	Anti-Jacksonian	18th	March 4, 1833 – March 4, 1835	
Henry Burk	Republican	3rd	March 4, 1901 – December 5, 1903	Died.
James F. Burke	Republican	31st	March 4, 1905 – March 4, 1915	
William J. Burke	Republican	At-large	March 4, 1919 – March 4, 1923	
Thomas Burnside	Democratic-Republican	9th	October 10, 1815 – April ???, 1816	Resigned to become President Judge of Luzerne District Courts.
Alvin Bush	Republican	15th	January 3, 1951 – January 3, 1953	
Alvin Bush	Republican	17th	January 3, 1953 – November 5, 1959	Died.
Robert G. Bushong	Republican	14th	March 4, 1927 – March 4, 1929	
Chester P. Butler	Whig	11th	March 4, 1847 – October 5, 1850	Died.
Thomas S. Butler	Independent Republican	6th	March 4, 1897 – March 4, 1899	
Thomas S. Butler	Republican	6th	March 4, 1899 – March 4, 1903	
Thomas S. Butler	Republican	7th	March 4, 1903 – March 4, 1923	
Thomas S. Butler	Republican	8th	March 4, 1923 – May 26, 1928	Died.
James A. Byrne	Democratic	3rd	January 3, 1953 – January 3, 1973	
John Cadwalader	Democratic	5th	March 4, 1855 – March 4, 1857	
Henry L. Cake	Republican	10th	March 4, 1867 – March 4, 1871	
Samuel Calvin	Whig	17th	March 4, 1849 – March 4, 1851	
Guy E. Campbell	Democratic	32nd	March 4, 1917 – March 4, 1923	
Guy E. Campbell	Republican	36th	March 4, 1923 – March 4, 1933	
Howard E. Campbell	Republican	29th	January 3, 1945 – January 3, 1947	
Jacob M. Campbell	Republican	17th	March 4, 1877 – March 4, 1879	
Jacob M. Campbell	Republican	17th	March 4, 1881 – March 4, 1887	
James H. Campbell	Opposition	11th	March 4, 1855 – March 4, 1857	
James H. Campbell	Republican	11th	March 4, 1859 – March 4, 1863	
John H. Campbell	Know Nothing	3rd	March 4, 1845 – March 4, 1847	
Christopher Carney	Democratic	10th	January 3, 2007 – January 3, 2011	Lost re-election.
Edmund N. Carpenter	Republican	12th	March 4, 1925 – March 4, 1927	
Wooda N. Carr	Democratic	23rd	March 4, 1913 – March 4, 1915	
Joseph L. Carrigg	Republican	14th	November 6, 1951 – January 3, 1953	
Joseph L. Carrigg	Republican	10th	January 3, 1953 – January 3, 1959	
Matt Cartwright	Democratic	17th	January 3, 2013 – January 3, 2019	Redistricted.
Matt Cartwright	Democratic	8th	January 3, 2019 – January 3, 2025	Lost re-election
John J. Casey	Democratic	11th	March 4, 1913 – March 4, 1917	
John J. Casey	Democratic	11th	March 4, 1919 – March 4, 1921	
John J. Casey	Democratic	12th	March 4, 1923 – March 4, 1925	
John J. Casey	Democratic	12th	March 4, 1927 – May 5, 1929	Died.
Joseph Casey	Whig	13th	March 4, 1849 – March 4, 1851	
Henry B. Cassel	Republican	10th	November 5, 1901 – March 4, 1903	
Henry B. Cassel	Republican	9th	March 4, 1903 – March 4, 1909	
George A. Castor	Republican	3rd	February 16, 1904 – February 19, 1906	Died.
Anthony Cavalcante	Democratic	23rd	January 3, 1949 – January 3, 1951	
John Cessna	Republican	16th	March 4, 1869 – March 4, 1871	
John Cessna	Republican	16th	March 4, 1873 – March 4, 1875	
E. Wallace Chadwick	Republican	7th	January 3, 1947 – January 3, 1949	
George Chambers	Anti-Masonic	12th	March 4, 1833 – March 4, 1837	
Joseph R. Chandler	Whig	2nd	March 4, 1849 – March 4, 1855	
Henry Chapman	Democratic	7th	March 4, 1857 – March 4, 1859	
John Chapman	Federalist	4th	March 4, 1797 – March 4, 1799	
J. Mitchell Chase	Republican	23rd	March 4, 1927 – March 4, 1933	
Earl Chudoff	Democratic	4th	January 3, 1949 – January 5, 1958	Resigned to become judge of the Philadelphia Court of Common Pleas.
Frank M. Clark	Democratic	25th	January 3, 1955 – December 31, 1974	
Henry A. Clark	Republican	25th	March 4, 1917 – March 4, 1919	
William Clark	Anti-Masonic	10th	March 4, 1833 – March 4, 1837	
Joseph Clay	Democratic-Republican	1st	March 4, 1803 – March 28, 1808	Resigned.
William F. Clinger Jr.	Republican	23rd	January 3, 1979 – January 3, 1993	
William F. Clinger Jr.	Republican	5th	January 3, 1993 – January 3, 1997	
George Clymer	Pro-Administration	At-large	March 4, 1789 – March 4, 1791	
Hiester Clymer	Democratic	8th	March 4, 1873 – March 4, 1881	
Alexander G. Cochran	Democratic	23rd	March 4, 1875 – March 4, 1877	
Thomas C. Cochran	Republican	28th	March 4, 1927 – March 4, 1933	
Thomas C. Cochran	Republican	20th	March 4, 1933 – January 3, 1935	
James H. Codding	Republican	15th	November 5, 1895 – March 4, 1899	
Robert L. Coffey	Democratic	26th	January 3, 1949 – April 20, 1949	Died.
Alexander Hamilton Coffroth	Democratic	16th	March 4, 1863 – March 4, 1865	
Alexander Hamilton Coffroth	Democratic	16th	February 19, 1866 – July 18, 1866	Successfully contested the election of his opponent.
Alexander Hamilton Coffroth	Democratic	17th	March 4, 1879 – March 4, 1881	
William H. Coleman	Republican	30th	March 4, 1915 – March 4, 1917	
Francis D. Collins	Democratic	11th	March 4, 1875 – March 4, 1879	
John Conard	Democratic-Republican	1st	March 4, 1803 – March 4, 1815	
Charles R. Connell	Republican	10th	March 4, 1921 – September 26, 1922	Died.
William Connell	Republican	11th	March 4, 1897 – March 4, 1903	
William Connell	Republican	10th	February 10, 1904 – March 4, 1905	
Daniel W. Connolly	Democratic	12th	March 4, 1883 – March 4, 1885	
James J. Connolly	Republican	5th	March 4, 1921 – January 3, 1935	
William S. Conover	Republican	27th	April 25, 1972 – January 3, 1973	
Frederick Conrad	Democratic-Republican	2nd	March 4, 1803 – March 4, 1807	
Joel Cook	Republican	2nd	November 5, 1907 – December 15, 1910	Died.
Allen F. Cooper	Republican	23rd	March 4, 1903 – March 4, 1911	
James Cooper	Whig	12th	March 4, 1839 – March 4, 1843	
Thomas B. Cooper	Democratic	7th	March 4, 1861 – April 4, 1862	
Robert J. Corbett	Republican	30th	January 3, 1939 – January 3, 1941	
Robert J. Corbett	Republican	30th	January 3, 1945 – January 3, 1953	
Robert J. Corbett	Republican	29th	January 3, 1953 – January 3, 1963	
Peter E. Costello	Republican	5th	March 4, 1915 – March 4, 1921	
Ryan Costello	Republican	6th	January 3, 2015 – January 3, 2019	Retired.
Clarence D. Coughlin	Republican	11th	March 4, 1921 – March 4, 1923	
R. Lawrence Coughlin	Republican	13th	January 3, 1969 – January 3, 1993	
Richard Coulter	Jacksonian	17th	March 4, 1827 – March 4, 1833	
Richard Coulter	Jacksonian	19th	March 4, 1833 – March 4, 1835	
John Covode	Opposition	19th	March 4, 1855 – March 4, 1857	
John Covode	Republican	19th	March 4, 1857 – March 4, 1863	
John Covode	Republican	21st	March 4, 1867 – March 4, 1869	
John Covode	Republican	21st	February 9, 1870 – January 11, 1871	Died.
William R. Coyle	Republican	30th	March 4, 1925 – March 4, 1927	
William R. Coyle	Republican	30th	March 4, 1929 – March 4, 1933	
James K. Coyne III	Republican	8th	January 3, 1981 – January 3, 1983	
William J. Coyne	Democratic	14th	January 3, 1981 – January 3, 2003	Retired.
Thomas S. Crago	Republican	23rd	March 4, 1911 – March 4, 1913	
Thomas S. Crago	Republican	At-large	March 4, 1915 – March 4, 1921	
Thomas S. Crago	Republican	At-large	September 20, 1921 – March 4, 1923	
Alexander K. Craig	Democratic	24th	February 26, 1892 – July 29, 1892	Died.
Samuel A. Craig	Republican	21st	March 4, 1889 – March 4, 1891	
Nathaniel N. Craley Jr.	Democratic	19th	January 3, 1965 – January 3, 1967	
Thomas Hartley Crawford	Jacksonian	11th	March 4, 1829 – March 4, 1833	
William Crawford	Democratic-Republican	6th	March 4, 1809 – March 4, 1813	
William Crawford	Democratic-Republican	5th	March 4, 1813 – March 4, 1817	
John V. Creely	Republican	2nd	March 4, 1871 – March 4, 1873	
Mark Critz	Democratic	12th	May 18, 2010 – January 3, 2013	Lost re-election.
William M. Croll	Democratic	14th	March 4, 1923 – March 4, 1925	
Charles N. Crosby	Democratic	29th	March 4, 1933 – January 3, 1939	
Edward Crouch	Democratic-Republican	3rd	October 12, 1813 – March 4, 1815	
William J. Crow	Republican	23rd	January 3, 1947 – January 3, 1949	
William C. Culbertson	Republican	26th	March 4, 1889 – March 4, 1891	
Charles V. Culver	Republican	20th	March 4, 1865 – March 4, 1867	
Herbert W. Cummings	Democratic	17th	March 4, 1923 – March 4, 1925	
Andrew G. Curtin	Democratic	20th	March 4, 1881 – March 4, 1887	
Willard S. Curtin	Republican	8th	January 3, 1957 – January 3, 1967	
Carlton B. Curtis	Democratic	23rd	March 4, 1851 – March 4, 1853	
Carlton B. Curtis	Democratic	24th	March 4, 1853 – March 4, 1855	
Carlton B. Curtis	Republican	19th	March 4, 1873 – March 4, 1875	
Paul B. Dague	Republican	9th	January 3, 1947 – December 30, 1966	Resigned.
Kathy Dahlkemper	Democratic	3rd	January 3, 2009 – January 3, 2011	Lost re-election.
Thomas H. Dale	Republican	10th	March 4, 1905 – March 4, 1907	
J. Burrwood Daly	Democratic	4th	January 3, 1935 – March 12, 1939	Died.
John Dalzell	Republican	22nd	March 4, 1887 – March 4, 1903	
John Dalzell	Republican	30th	March 4, 1903 – March 4, 1913	
Joel B. Danner	Democratic	15th	December 2, 1850 – March 4, 1851	
Edward Darlington	Anti-Masonic	4th	March 4, 1833 – March 4, 1839	
Isaac Darlington	Federalist	2nd	March 4, 1817 – March 4, 1819	
Smedley Darlington	Republican	6th	March 4, 1887 – March 4, 1891	
William Darlington	Democratic-Republican	2nd	March 4, 1815 – March 4, 1817	
William Darlington	Democratic-Republican	2nd	March 4, 1819 – March 4, 1823	
Cornelius Darragh	Whig	21st	March 26, 1844 – March 4, 1847	
George P. Darrow	Republican	6th	March 4, 1915 – March 4, 1923	
George P. Darrow	Republican	7th	March 4, 1923 – January 3, 1937	
George P. Darrow	Republican	7th	January 3, 1939 – January 3, 1941	
Harry J. Davenport	Democratic	29th	January 3, 1949 – January 3, 1951	
Samuel A. Davenport	Republican	At-large	March 4, 1897 – March 4, 1901	
Stanley W. Davenport	Democratic	12th	March 4, 1899 – March 4, 1901	
Edward Davies	Anti-Masonic	4th	March 4, 1837 – March 4, 1841	
John Davis	Democratic	6th	March 4, 1839 – March 4, 1841	
Robert L. Davis	Republican	6th	November 8, 1932 – March 4, 1933	
Roger Davis	Democratic-Republican	2nd	March 4, 1811 – March 4, 1813	
Roger Davis	Democratic-Republican	3rd	March 4, 1813 – March 4, 1815	
William M. Davis	Republican	5th	March 4, 1861 – March 4, 1863	
John L. Dawson	Democratic	18th	March 4, 1851 – March 4, 1853	
John L. Dawson	Democratic	20th	March 4, 1853 – March 4, 1855	
John L. Dawson	Democratic	21st	March 4, 1863 – March 4, 1867	
Madeleine Dean	Democratic	4th	January 3, 2019 – present	Incumbent
Peter J. De Muth	Democratic	30th	January 3, 1937 – January 3, 1939	
Elias Deemer	Republican	16th	March 4, 1901 – March 4, 1903	
Elias Deemer	Republican	15th	March 4, 1903 – March 4, 1907	
Chris Deluzio	Democratic	17th	January 3, 2023 – present	Incumbent
Charles Denison	Democratic	12th	March 4, 1863 – June 27, 1867	Died.
George Denison	Democratic-Republican	10th	March 4, 1819 – March 4, 1823	
Harmar Denny	Anti-Masonic	16th	December 15, 1829 – March 4, 1833	
Harmar Denny	Anti-Masonic	22nd	March 4, 1833 – March 4, 1837	
Harmar D. Denny Jr.	Republican	29th	January 3, 1951 – January 3, 1953	
Charlie Dent	Republican	15th	January 3, 2005 – May 12, 2018	Resigned.
John H. Dent	Democratic	21st	January 21, 1958 – January 3, 1979	
Franklin L. Dershem	Democratic	17th	March 4, 1913 – March 4, 1915	
Arthur G. Dewalt	Democratic	13th	March 4, 1915 – March 4, 1921	
Lewis Dewart	Jacksonian	9th	March 4, 1831 – March 4, 1833	
William L. Dewart	Democratic	11th	March 4, 1857 – March 4, 1859	
John Dick	Whig	25th	March 4, 1853 – March 4, 1855	
John Dick	Opposition	25th	March 4, 1855 – March 4, 1857	
John Dick	Republican	25th	March 4, 1857 – March 4, 1859	
Samuel B. Dick	Republican	26th	March 4, 1879 – March 4, 1881	
Charles H. Dickerman	Democratic	16th	March 4, 1903 – March 4, 1905	
Jesse C. Dickey	Whig	7th	March 4, 1849 – March 4, 1851	
John Dickey	Whig	20th	March 4, 1843 – March 4, 1845	
John Dickey	Whig	20th	March 4, 1847 – March 4, 1849	
Oliver J. Dickey	Republican	9th	December 7, 1868 – March 4, 1873	
Charles E. Dietrich	Democratic	15th	January 3, 1935 – January 3, 1937	
Robert E. Difenderfer	Democratic	8th	March 4, 1911 – March 4, 1915	
Milo M. Dimmick	Democratic	10th	March 4, 1849 – March 4, 1853	
William H. Dimmick	Democratic	13th	March 4, 1857 – March 4, 1861	
Davis Dimock Jr.	Democratic	17th	March 4, 1841 – January 13, 1842	Died.
J. William Ditter	Republican	17th	March 4, 1933 – November 21, 1943	Died.
Joseph B. Donley	Republican	24th	March 4, 1869 – March 4, 1871	
Michael Donohoe	Democratic	5th	March 4, 1911 – March 4, 1915	
Frank J. G. Dorsey	Democratic	5th	January 3, 1935 – January 3, 1939	
Charles F. Dougherty	Republican	4th	January 3, 1979 – January 3, 1983	
Isaac H. Doutrich	Democratic	19th	March 4, 1927 – January 3, 1937	
Michael F. Doyle	Democratic	18th	January 3, 1995 – January 3, 2003	Redistricted.
Michael F. Doyle	Democratic	14th	January 3, 2003 – January 3, 2019	Redistricted.
Michael F. Doyle	Democratic	18th	January 3, 2019 – December 31, 2022	Retired and resigned early.
Solomon R. Dresser	Republican	21st	March 4, 1903 – March 4, 1907	
Ira W. Drew	Democratic	7th	January 3, 1937 – January 3, 1939	
Denis J. Driscoll	Democratic	20th	January 3, 1935 – January 3, 1937	
Augustus Drum	Democratic	19th	March 4, 1853 – March 4, 1855	
William A. Duncan	Democratic	19th	March 4, 1883 – November 14, 1884	Died.
Matthew A. Dunn	Democratic	34th	March 4, 1933 – January 3, 1941	
Herman P. Eberharter	Democratic	32nd	January 3, 1937 – January 3, 1943	Died.
Herman P. Eberharter	Democratic	31st	January 3, 1943 – January 3, 1945	Died.
Herman P. Eberharter	Democratic	32nd	January 3, 1945 – January 3, 1953	Died.
Herman P. Eberharter	Democratic	28th	January 3, 1953 – September 9, 1958	Died.
Charles R. Eckert	Democratic	26th	January 3, 1935 – January 3, 1939	
George N. Eckert	Whig	14th	March 4, 1847 – March 4, 1849	
Robert W. Edgar	Democratic	7th	January 3, 1975 – January 3, 1987	
John R Edie	Opposition	18th	March 4, 1855 – March 4, 1857	
John R Edie	Republican	18th	March 4, 1857 – March 4, 1859	
George W. Edmonds	Republican	4th	March 4, 1913 – March 4, 1925	
George W. Edmonds	Republican	4th	March 4, 1933 – January 3, 1935	
John Edwards	Anti-Masonic	4th	March 4, 1839 – March 4, 1841	
John Edwards	Whig	4th	March 4, 1841 – March 4, 1843	
Samuel Edwards	Federalist	1st	March 4, 1819 – March 4, 1823	
Samuel Edwards	Federalist	4th	March 4, 1823 – March 4, 1825	
Samuel Edwards	Jacksonian	4th	March 4, 1825 – March 4, 1827	
Albert G. Egbert	Democratic	27th	March 4, 1875 – March 4, 1877	
George Ege	Federalist	5th	December 8, 1796 – October ???, 1797	Resigned.
Joshua Eilberg	Democratic	4th	January 3, 1967 – January 3, 1979	
Henry Ellenbogen	Democratic	33rd	March 4, 1933 – January 3, 1938	Resigned to become a judge of common pleas for Allegheny County, PA
Douglas H. Elliott	Republican	18th	April 26, 1960 – June 19, 1960	Died.
Mortimer F. Elliott	Democratic	At-large	March 4, 1883 – March 4, 1885	
William Cox Ellis	Federalist	9th	March 4, 1823 – March 4, 1825	
Phil English	Republican	21st	January 3, 1995 – January 3, 2003	
Phil English	Republican	3rd	January 3, 2003 – January 3, 2009	
Constantine J. Erdman	Democratic	9th	March 4, 1893 – March 4, 1897	
Jacob Erdman	Democratic	6th	March 4, 1845 – March 4, 1847	
Edmund F. Erk	Republican	32nd	November 4, 1930 – March 4, 1933	
Daniel Ermentrout	Democratic	8th	March 4, 1881 – March 4, 1889	
Daniel Ermentrout	Democratic	9th	March 4, 1897 – September 17, 1899	Died.
Russell Errett	Republican	22nd	March 4, 1877 – March 4, 1883	
Allen E. Ertel	Democratic	17th	January 3, 1977 – January 3, 1983	
Edwin D. Eshleman	Republican	16th	January 3, 1967 – January 3, 1977	
Harry A. Estep	Republican	35th	March 4, 1927 – March 4, 1933	
Charles J Esterly	Republican	14th	March 4, 1925 – March 4, 1927	
Charles J Esterly	Republican	14th	March 4, 1929 – March 4, 1931	
Alvin Evans	Republican	20th	March 4, 1901 – March 4, 1903	
Alvin Evans	Republican	19th	March 4, 1903 – March 4, 1905	
Dwight Evans	Democratic	2nd	November 8, 2016 – January 3, 2019	Redistricted.
Dwight Evans	Democratic	3rd	January 3, 2019 – present	Incumbent
Isaac N Evans	Republican	7th	March 4, 1877 – March 4, 1879	
Isaac N Evans	Republican	7th	March 4, 1883 – March 4, 1887	
Joshua Evans Jr.	Jacksonian	4th	March 4, 1829 – March 4, 1833	
James B. Everhart	Republican	6th	March 4, 1883 – March 4, 1887	
William Everhart	Whig	6th	March 4, 1853 – March 4, 1855	
John H. Ewing	Whig	20th	March 4, 1845 – March 4, 1847	
Charles I. Faddis	Democratic	25th	March 4, 1933 – December 4, 1942	Resigned to join the US Army.
John R. Farr	Republican	10th	March 4, 1911 – March 4, 1919	
John R. Farr	Republican	10th	February 25, 1921 – March 4, 1921	Successfully contested the election of Patrick McLane.
John W. Farrelly	Whig	22nd	March 4, 1847 – March 4, 1849	
Patrick Farrelly	Democratic-Republican	15th	March 4, 1821 – March 4, 1823	Died.
Patrick Farrelly	Democratic-Republican	18th	March 4, 1823 – March 4, 1825	Died.
Patrick Farrelly	Jacksonian	18th	March 4, 1825 – January 12, 1826	Died.
Chaka Fattah	Democratic	2nd	January 3, 1995 – June 23, 2016	Resigned due to conviction of corruption charges.
Clare G. Fenerty	Republican	3rd	January 3, 1935 – January 3, 1937	
Ivor D. Fenton	Republican	13th	January 3, 1939 – January 3, 1945	
Ivor D. Fenton	Republican	12th	January 3, 1945 – January 3, 1963	
John Findlay	Democratic-Republican	5th	October 9, 1821 – March 4, 1823	
John Findlay	Democratic-Republican	11th	March 4, 1823 – March 4, 1825	
John Findlay	Jacksonian	11th	March 4, 1825 – March 4, 1827	
William Findley	Anti-Administration	8th	March 4, 1791 – March 4, 1793	
William Findley	Anti-Administration	At-large	March 4, 1793 – March 4, 1795	
William Findley	Democratic-Republican	11th	March 4, 1795 – March 4, 1799	
William Findley	Democratic-Republican	8th	March 4, 1803 – March 4, 1813	
William Findley	Democratic-Republican	11th	March 4, 1813 – March 4, 1817	
Darwin A. Finney	Republican	20th	March 4, 1867 – August 25, 1868	Died.
Horatio G. Fisher	Republican	18th	March 4, 1879 – March 4, 1883	
Brian Fitzpatrick	Republican	8th	January 3, 2017 – January 3, 2019	Redistricted.
Brian Fitzpatrick	Republican	1st	January 3, 2019 – present	Incumbent
Mike Fitzpatrick	Republican	8th	January 3, 2005 – January 3, 2007	Lost re-election.
Mike Fitzpatrick	Republican	8th	January 3, 2011 – January 3, 2017	Retired.
Thomas Fitzsimons	Pro-Administration	At-large	March 4, 1789 – March 4, 1791	Redistricted.
Thomas Fitzsimons	Pro-Administration	1st	March 4, 1791 – March 3, 1793	Redistricted.
Thomas Fitzsimons	Pro-Administration	At-large	March 4, 1793 – March 4, 1795	Lost re-election.
J. Harold Flannery	Democratic	12th	January 3, 1937 – January 3, 1942	Resigned to become judge of common pleas of Luzerne County, Pennsylvania.
George W. Fleeger	Republican	26th	March 4, 1885 – March 4, 1887	
Daniel Flood	Democratic	11th	January 3, 1945 – January 3, 1947	
Daniel Flood	Democratic	11th	January 3, 1949 – January 3, 1953	
Daniel Flood	Democratic	11th	January 3, 1955 – January 31, 1980	Resigned due to allegations of bribery.
Thomas B. Florence	Democratic	1st	March 4, 1851 – March 4, 1861	
Benjamin K. Focht	Republican	17th	March 4, 1907 – March 4, 1913	
Benjamin K. Focht	Republican	17th	March 4, 1915 – March 4, 1923	
Benjamin K. Focht	Republican	18th	March 4, 1933 – March 27, 1937	
Robert H. Foerderer	Republican	At-large	March 4, 1901 – March 4, 1903	Died.
Robert H. Foerderer	Republican	4th	March 4, 1903 – July 26, 1903	Died.
Thomas M. Foglietta	Democratic	1st	January 3, 1981 – November 11, 1997	Resigned to become Ambassador to Italy.
James Ford	Jacksonian	9th	March 4, 1829 – March 4, 1833	
Joseph Fornance	Democratic	5th	March 4, 1839 – March 4, 1843	
Thomas Forrest	Federalist	1st	March 4, 1819 – March 4, 1821	
Thomas Forrest	Federalist	1st	October 8, 1822 – March 4, 1823	
Chauncey Forward	Jacksonian	13th	December 4, 1826 – March 4, 1831	
Walter Forward	Democratic-Republican	14th	October 8, 1822 – March 4, 1823	
Walter Forward	Democratic-Republican	16th	March 4, 1823 – March 4, 1825	
Henry D Foster	Democratic	19th	March 4, 1843 – March 4, 1847	
Henry D Foster	Democratic	21st	March 4, 1871 – March 4, 1873	
William W. Foulkrod	Republican	5th	March 4, 1907 – November 13, 1910	Died.
Jon D. Fox	Republican	13th	January 3, 1995 – January 3, 1999	
John Freedley	Whig	5th	March 4, 1847 – March 4, 1851	
Chapman Freeman	Republican	1st	March 4, 1875 – March 4, 1879	
Oliver W. Frey	Democratic	9th	November 7, 1933 – January 3, 1939	
Henry Frick	Whig	13th	March 4, 1843 – March 1, 1844	Died.
Jacob Fry Jr.	Jacksonian	5th	March 4, 1835 – March 4, 1837	
Jacob Fry Jr.	Democratic	5th	March 4, 1837 – March 4, 1839	
Joseph Fry Jr.	Jacksonian	7th	March 4, 1827 – March 4, 1831	
George Fuller	Democratic	12th	December 2, 1844 – March 4, 1845	
Henry M Fuller	Whig	11th	March 4, 1851 – March 4, 1853	
Henry M Fuller	Opposition	12th	March 4, 1855 – March 4, 1857	
David Fullerton	Democratic-Republican	5th	March 4, 1819 – May 15, 1820	Resigned.
James G. Fulton	Republican	31st	January 3, 1945 – January 3, 1953	Died.
James G. Fulton	Republican	27th	January 3, 1953 – October 6, 1971	Died.
Grant Furlong	Democratic	25th	January 3, 1943 – January 3, 1945	
John Galbraith	Jacksonian	25th	March 4, 1833 – March 4, 1837	
John Galbraith	Democratic	25th	March 4, 1839 – March 4, 1841	
James A. Gallagher	Republican	1st	January 3, 1943 – January 3, 1945	
James A. Gallagher	Republican	1st	January 3, 1947 – January 3, 1949	
Albert Gallatin	Democratic-Republican	12th	March 4, 1795 – March 4, 1801	
James Gamble	Democratic	13th	March 4, 1851 – March 4, 1853	
James Gamble	Democratic	15th	March 4, 1853 – March 4, 1855	
Mahlon M. Garland	Republican	At-large	March 4, 1915 – November 19, 1920	Died.
Alfred B. Garner	Republican	12th	March 4, 1909 – March 4, 1911	
Fred C. Gartner	Republican	5th	March 4, 1939 – March 4, 1941	
William S. Garvin	Democratic	22nd	March 4, 1845 – March 4, 1847	
Athelston Gaston	Democratic	26th	March 4, 1899 – March 4, 1901	
Leon H. Gavin	Republican	20th	January 3, 1943 – January 3, 1945	
Leon H. Gavin	Republican	19th	January 3, 1945 – January 3, 1953	
Leon H. Gavin	Republican	23rd	January 3, 1953 – September 15, 1963	
Joseph M. Gaydos	Democratic	20th	November 5, 1968 – January 3, 1993	
George Gekas	Republican	17th	January 3, 1983 – January 3, 2003	
Charles L. Gerlach	Republican	9th	January 3, 1939 – January 3, 1945	
Charles L. Gerlach	Republican	8th	January 3, 1945 – May 5, 1947	
Jim Gerlach	Republican	6th	January 3, 2003 – January 3, 2015	
Fred B. Gernerd	Republican	13th	March 4, 1921 – March 4, 1923	
James Gerry	Democratic	11th	March 4, 1839 – March 4, 1843	
James L. Getz	Democratic	8th	March 4, 1867 – March 4, 1873	
James H. Gildea	Democratic	13th	January 3, 1935 – January 3, 1939	
Calvin W. Gilfillan	Republican	20th	March 4, 1869 – March 4, 1871	
Eugene P. Gillespie	Democratic	25th	March 4, 1891 – March 4, 1893	
Wilson D. Gillette	Republican	15th	November 4, 1941 – January 3, 1945	Died.
Wilson D. Gillette	Republican	14th	January 3, 1945 – August 7, 1951	Died.
James L. Gillis	Democratic	24th	March 4, 1857 – March 4, 1859	
Alfred Gilmore	Democratic	24th	March 4, 1849 – March 4, 1853	
John Gilmore	Jacksonian	16th	March 4, 1829 – March 4, 1833	
Don H. Gingery	Democratic	23rd	January 3, 1935 – January 3, 1939	
Hugh Glasgow	Democratic-Republican	4th	March 4, 1813 – March 4, 1817	
Samuel F. Glatfelter	Democratic	22nd	March 4, 1923 – March 4, 1925	
John Gloninger	Federalist	3rd	March 4, 1813 – August 2, 1813	Resigned after being appointed associate judge of Lebanon County.
Adam J. Glossbrenner	Democratic	15th	March 4, 1865 – March 4, 1869	
William Godshalk	Republican	7th	March 4, 1879 – March 4, 1883	
Benjamin M. Golder	Republican	4th	March 4, 1925 – March 4, 1933	
George A Goodling	Republican	19th	January 3, 1961 – January 3, 1965	
George A Goodling	Republican	19th	January 3, 1967 – January 3, 1975	
William F. Goodling	Republican	19th	January 3, 1975 – January 3, 2001	
George S. Graham	Republican	2nd	March 4, 1913 – July 4, 1931	Died.
Louis E. Graham	Republican	26th	January 3, 1939 – January 3, 1945	
Louis E. Graham	Republican	25th	January 3, 1945 – January 3, 1955	
William H. Graham	Republican	23rd	November 29, 1898 – March 4, 1903	
William H. Graham	Republican	29th	March 4, 1905 – March 4, 1911	
Kathryn E. Granahan	Democratic	2nd	November 6, 1956 – January 3, 1963	
William T. Granahan	Democratic	2nd	January 3, 1945 – January 3, 1947	
William T. Granahan	Democratic	2nd	January 3, 1949 – May 25, 1956	Died.
Joseph A. Gray	Democratic	27th	January 3, 1935 – January 3, 1939	
William H. Gray	Democratic	2nd	January 3, 1979 – September 11, 1991	Resigned.
Henry D. Green	Democratic	9th	November 7, 1899 – March 4, 1903	
Innis Green	Jacksonian	6th	March 4, 1827 – March 4, 1831	
William J. Green, Jr.	Democratic	5th	January 3, 1945 – January 3, 1947	
William J. Green, Jr.	Democratic	5th	January 3, 1949 – December 21, 1963	Died.
William J. Green III	Democratic	5th	April 28, 1964 – January 3, 1973	
William J. Green III	Democratic	3rd	January 3, 1973 – January 3, 1977	
James C. Greenwood	Republican	8th	January 3, 1993 – January 3, 2005	
Andrew Gregg	Anti-Administration	6th	March 4, 1791 – March 4, 1793	
Andrew Gregg	Anti-Administration	At-large	March 4, 1793 – March 4, 1795	
Andrew Gregg	Democratic-Republican	9th	March 4, 1795 – March 4, 1803	
Andrew Gregg	Democratic-Republican	5th	March 4, 1803 – March 4, 1807	
Curtis H. Gregg	Democratic	22nd	March 4, 1911 – March 4, 1913	
William W Griest	Republican	9th	March 4, 1909 – March 4, 1923	Died.
William W Griest	Republican	10th	March 4, 1923 – December 5, 1929	Died.
Isaac Griffin	Democratic-Republican	13th	May 13, 1813 – March 4, 1817	
Samuel Griffith	Democratic	20th	March 4, 1871 – March 4, 1873	
Matthew Griswold	Republican	26th	March 4, 1891 – March 4, 1893	
Matthew Griswold	Republican	26th	March 4, 1895 – March 4, 1897	
Chester H. Gross	Republican	22nd	January 3, 1939 – January 3, 1941	
Chester H. Gross	Republican	22nd	January 3, 1943 – January 3, 1945	
Chester H. Gross	Republican	21st	January 3, 1945 – January 3, 1949	
Samuel Gross	Democratic-Republican	2nd	March 4, 1819 – March 4, 1823	
Galusha A. Grow	Democratic	12th	March 4, 1851 – March 4, 1853	
Galusha A. Grow	Democratic	14th	March 4, 1853 – March 4, 1857	
Galusha A. Grow	Republican	14th	March 4, 1857 – March 4, 1863	
Galusha A. Grow	Republican	At-large	February 26, 1894 – March 4, 1903	
Amos Gustine	Democratic	13th	March 4, 1841 – March 4, 1843	
John Hahn	Democratic-Republican	2nd	March 4, 1815 – March 4, 1817	
Harry L. Haines	Democratic	22nd	March 4, 1931 – January 3, 1939	
Harry L. Haines	Democratic	22nd	January 3, 1941 – January 3, 1943	
Richard J. Haldeman	Democratic	15th	March 4, 1869 – March 4, 1873	
James T. Hale	Republican	15th	March 4, 1859 – March 4, 1863	
James T. Hale	Independent Republican	18th	March 4, 1863 – March 4, 1865	
Chapin Hall	Republican	24th	March 4, 1859 – March 4, 1861	
James K. P. Hall	Democratic	28th	March 4, 1899 – November 29, 1902	Resigned after being elected to the Pennsylvania State Senate.
Norman Hall	Democratic	26th	March 4, 1887 – March 4, 1889	
Edwin Hallowell	Democratic	7th	March 4, 1891 – March 4, 1893	
Frederick Halterman	Republican	3rd	March 4, 1895 – March 4, 1897	
John Hamilton	Democratic-Republican	10th	March 4, 1805 – March 4, 1807	
Robert H. Hammond	Democratic	16th	March 4, 1837 – March 4, 1841	
Moses Hampton	Whig	21st	March 4, 1847 – March 4, 1851	
John A. Hanna	Democratic-Republican	6th	March 4, 1797 – March 4, 1803	Died.
John A. Hanna	Democratic-Republican	4th	March 4, 1803 – July 23, 1805	Died.
Alfred C. Harmer	Republican	5th	March 4, 1871 – March 4, 1875	
Alfred C. Harmer	Republican	5th	March 4, 1877 – March 6, 1900	Died.
James Harper	Anti-Jacksonian	2nd	March 4, 1833 – March 4, 1837	
Robert Harris	Democratic-Republican	6th	March 4, 1823 – March 4, 1825	
Robert Harris	Jacksonian	6th	March 4, 1825 – March 4, 1827	
Frank G. Harrison	Democratic	11th	January 3, 1983 – January 3, 1985	
Samuel S. Harrison	Jacksonian	23rd	March 4, 1833 – March 4, 1837	
Joseph J. Hart	Democratic	8th	March 4, 1895 – March 4, 1897	
Melissa Hart	Republican	4th	January 3, 2001 – January 3, 2007	
Thomas Hartley	Pro-Administration	At-large	March 4, 1789 – March 4, 1791	Died.
Thomas Hartley	Pro-Administration	7th	March 4, 1791 – March 4, 1793	Died.
Thomas Hartley	Pro-Administration	At-large	March 4, 1793 – March 4, 1795	Died.
Thomas Hartley	Federalist	8th	March 4, 1795 – December 21, 1800	Died.
Jesse L. Hartman	Republican	19th	March 4, 1911 – March 4, 1913	
Samuel Hays	Democratic	22nd	March 4, 1843 – March 4, 1845	
James M. Hazlett	Republican	1st	March 4, 1927 – October 20, 1927	Resigned.
Robert D. Heaton	Republican	12th	March 4, 1915 – March 4, 1919	
Daniel B Heiner	Republican	21st	March 4, 1893 – March 4, 1897	
H. John Heinz III	Republican	18th	November 2, 1971 – January 3, 1977	
Joseph Hemphill	Federalist	3rd	March 4, 1801 – March 4, 1803	
Joseph Hemphill	Federalist	1st	March 4, 1819 – March 4, 1823	Resigned.
Joseph Hemphill	Federalist	2nd	March 4, 1823 – 1826	Resigned.
Joseph Hemphill	Jacksonian	2nd	March 4, 1829 – March 4, 1831	
Joseph Henderson	Jacksonian	14th	March 4, 1833 – March 4, 1837	
Samuel Henderson	Federalist	2nd	October 11, 1814 – March 4, 1815	
Thomas Henry	Anti-Masonic	24th	March 4, 1837 – March 4, 1841	
Thomas Henry	Whig	24th	March 4, 1841 – March 4, 1843	
Jacob Hibshman	Democratic-Republican	3rd	March 4, 1819 – March 4, 1821	
John Hickman	Democratic	6th	March 4, 1855 – March 4, 1859	
John Hickman	Anti-Lecompton Democratic	6th	March 4, 1859 – March 4, 1861	
John Hickman	Republican	6th	March 4, 1861 – March 4, 1863	
Josiah D. Hicks	Republican	20th	March 4, 1893 – March 4, 1899	
John A. Hiestand	Republican	9th	March 4, 1885 – March 4, 1889	
Daniel Hiester	Anti-Administration	At-large	March 4, 1789 – March 4, 1791	Resigned.
Daniel Hiester	Anti-Administration	4th	March 4, 1791 – March 4, 1793	Resigned.
Daniel Hiester	Anti-Administration	At-large	March 4, 1793 – March 4, 1795	Resigned.
Daniel Hiester	Democratic-Republican	5th	March 4, 1795 – July 1, 1796	Resigned.
Daniel Hiester	Democratic-Republican	3rd	March 4, 1809 – March 4, 1811	
Isaac E. Hiester	Whig	9th	March 4, 1853 – March 4, 1855	
John Hiester	Democratic-Republican	3rd	March 4, 1807 – March 4, 1809	
Joseph Hiester	Democratic-Republican	5th	December 1, 1797 – March 4, 1803	
Joseph Hiester	Democratic-Republican	3rd	March 4, 1803 – March 4, 1805	
Joseph Hiester	Democratic-Republican	7th	March 4, 1815 – December ????, 1820	
William Hiester	Anti-Masonic	4th	March 4, 1831 – March 4, 1837	
William H. Hines	Democratic	12th	March 4, 1893 – March 4, 1895	
Daniel K. Hoch	Democratic	14th	January 3, 1943 – January 3, 1945	
Daniel K. Hoch	Democratic	13th	January 3, 1945 – January 3, 1947	
Joe Hoeffel	Democratic	13th	January 3, 1999 – January 3, 2005	
Carl H. Hoffman	Republican	23rd	May 21, 1946 – January 3, 1947	
John Hoge	Democratic-Republican	10th	November 2, 1804 – March 4, 1805	
William Hoge	Democratic-Republican	12th	March 4, 1801 – March 4, 1803	Resigned.
William Hoge	Democratic-Republican	10th	March 4, 1803 – October 15, 1804	Resigned.
William Hoge	Democratic-Republican	10th	March 4, 1807 – March 4, 1809	
Tim Holden	Democratic	6th	January 3, 1993 – January 3, 2003	Redistricted.
Tim Holden	Democratic	17th	January 3, 2003 – January 3, 2013	Lost renomination.
Elmer J. Holland	Democratic	33rd	May 19, 1942 – January 3, 1943	
Elmer J. Holland	Democratic	30th	January 24, 1956 – January 3, 1963	
Elmer J. Holland	Democratic	20th	January 3, 1963 – August 9, 1968	
Enos Hook	Democratic	20th	March 4, 1839 – April 18, 1841	Resigned.
Albert C. Hopkins	Republican	16th	March 4, 1891 – March 4, 1895	
James H Hopkins	Democratic	22nd	March 4, 1875 – March 4, 1877	
James H Hopkins	Democratic	22nd	March 4, 1883 – March 4, 1885	
Joseph Hopkinson	Federalist	1st	March 4, 1815 – March 4, 1819	
Robert F. Hopwood	Republican	23rd	March 4, 1915 – March 4, 1917	
Henry Horn	Jacksonian	2nd	March 4, 1831 – March 4, 1833	
John W. Hornbeck	Whig	6th	March 4, 1847 – January 16, 1848	Died.
Jacob Hostetter	Democratic-Republican	4th	November 16, 1818 – March 4, 1821	
Chrissy Houlahan	Democratic	6th	January 3, 2019 – present	Incumbent
John W. Howe	Free Soil	22nd	March 4, 1849 – March 4, 1851	
John W. Howe	Whig	22nd	March 4, 1851 – March 4, 1853	
Thomas M Howe	Whig	21st	March 4, 1851 – March 4, 1853	
Thomas M Howe	Whig	22nd	March 4, 1853 – March 4, 1855	
George Howell	Democratic	10th	March 4, 1903 – February 10, 1904	Lost election contest to William Connell.
Edward B Hubley	Jacksonian	8th	March 4, 1835 – March 4, 1837	
Edward B Hubley	Democratic	8th	March 4, 1837 – March 4, 1839	
George F Huff	Republican	21st	March 4, 1891 – March 4, 1893	
George F Huff	Republican	At-large	March 4, 1895 – March 4, 1897	
George F Huff	Republican	22nd	March 4, 1903 – March 4, 1911	
Willis J. Hulings	Progressive	28th	March 4, 1913 – March 4, 1915	
Willis J. Hulings	Republican	28th	March 4, 1919 – March 4, 1921	
John M. Hyneman	Democratic-Republican	3rd	March 4, 1811 – March 4, 1813	Resigned.
John M. Hyneman	Democratic-Republican	7th	March 4, 1813 – August 2, 1813	Resigned.
Peter Ihrie, Jr.	Jacksonian	8th	October 13, 1829 – March 4, 1833	
Charles J Ingersoll	Democratic-Republican	1st	March 4, 1813 – March 4, 1815	
Charles J Ingersoll	Democratic	3rd	March 4, 1841 – March 4, 1843	
Charles J Ingersoll	Democratic	4th	March 4, 1843 – March 4, 1849	
Joseph R Ingersoll	Anti-Jacksonian	2nd	March 4, 1835 – March 4, 1837	
Joseph R Ingersoll	Whig	2nd	October 12, 1841 – March 4, 1849	
Samuel D. Ingham	Democratic-Republican	6th	March 4, 1813 – July 6, 1818	Resigned.
Samuel D. Ingham	Democratic-Republican	6th	October 8, 1822 – March 4, 1823	
Alexander Irvin	Whig	24th	March 4, 1847 – March 4, 1849	
James Irvin	Whig	14th	March 4, 1841 – March 4, 1843	
James Irvin	Whig	17th	March 4, 1843 – March 4, 1845	
William Irvine	Anti-Administration	At-large	March 4, 1793 – March 4, 1795	
Jared Irwin	Democratic-Republican	10th	March 4, 1813 – March 4, 1817	
Thomas Irwin	Jacksonian	14th	March 4, 1829 – March 4, 1831	
William W. Irwin	Whig	22nd	March 4, 1841 – March 4, 1843	
Summers M. Jack	Republican	21st	March 4, 1899 – March 4, 1903	
William Jack	Democratic	23rd	March 4, 1841 – March 4, 1843	
Oscar L. Jackson	Republican	24th	March 4, 1885 – March 4, 1889	
Israel Jacobs	Pro-Administration	3rd	March 4, 1791 – March 4, 1793	
Cornelius C. Jadwin	Republican	15th	March 4, 1881 – March 4, 1883	
Benjamin F. James	Republican	7th	January 3, 1949 – January 3, 1959	
Francis James	Anti-Masonic	4th	March 4, 1839 – March 4, 1841	
Francis James	Whig	4th	March 4, 1841 – March 4, 1843	
Benjamin Jarrett	Republican	20th	January 3, 1937 – January 3, 1943	
Mitchell Jenkins	Republican	11th	January 3, 1947 – January 3, 1949	
Robert Jenkins	Federalist	3rd	March 4, 1807 – March 4, 1811	
George A. Jenks	Democratic	25th	March 4, 1875 – March 4, 1877	
Michael H. Jenks	Whig	6th	March 4, 1843 – March 4, 1845	
Albert W. Johnson	Republican	23rd	November 5, 1963 – January 3, 1977	
Philip Johnson	Democratic	13th	March 4, 1861 – March 4, 1863	Died.
Philip Johnson	Democratic	11th	March 4, 1863 – January 29, 1867	Died.
Evan J. Jones	Republican	21st	March 4, 1919 – March 4, 1923	
J Glancy Jones	Democratic	9th	March 4, 1851 – March 4, 1853	
J Glancy Jones	Democratic	8th	February 4, 1854 – October 30, 1858	Resigned to become Minister to Austria.
Owen Jones	Democratic	5th	March 4, 1857 – March 4, 1859	
William Jones	Democratic-Republican	1st	March 4, 1801 – March 4, 1803	
Edwin J. Jorden	Republican	15th	February 23, 1895 – March 4, 1895	
John Joyce	Republican	13th	January 3, 2019 – present	Incumbent
Benjamin F. Junkin	Republican	16th	March 4, 1859 – March 4, 1861	
Paul E. Kanjorski	Democratic	11th	January 3, 1985 – January 3, 2011	
Carroll D. Kearns	Republican	28th	January 3, 1947 – January 3, 1953	
Carroll D. Kearns	Republican	24th	January 3, 1953 – January 3, 1963	
George M. Keim	Democratic	9th	March 17, 1838 – March 4, 1843	
William H. Keim	Republican	8th	December 7, 1858 – March 4, 1859	
Abraham L. Keister	Republican	22nd	March 4, 1913 – March 4, 1917	
Fred Keller	Republican	12th	May 21, 2019 – January 3, 2023	Retired.
Augustine B. Kelley	Democratic	28th	January 3, 1941 – January 3, 1945	Died.
Augustine B. Kelley	Democratic	27th	January 3, 1945 – January 3, 1953	Died.
Augustine B. Kelley	Democratic	21st	January 3, 1953 – November 20, 1957	Died.
William D. Kelley	Republican	4th	March 4, 1861 – January 9, 1890	Died.
James Kelly	Federalist	6th	March 4, 1805 – March 4, 1809	
Mike Kelly	Republican	3rd	January 3, 2011 – January 3, 2019	Redistricted.
Mike Kelly	Republican	16th	January 3, 2019 – present	Incumbent
M. Clyde Kelly	Republican	30th	March 4, 1913 – March 4, 1915	
M. Clyde Kelly	Progressive	30th	March 4, 1917 – March 4, 1919	
M. Clyde Kelly	Republican	30th	March 4, 1919 – March 4, 1923	
M. Clyde Kelly	Republican	33rd	March 4, 1923 – January 3, 1933	
M. Clyde Kelly	Republican	31st	March 4, 1933 – January 3, 1935	
Samuel A Kendall	Republican	23rd	March 4, 1919 – March 4, 1923	Died.
Samuel A Kendall	Republican	24th	March 4, 1923 – January 8, 1933	Died.
Everett Kent	Democratic	30th	March 4, 1923 – March 4, 1925	
Everett Kent	Democratic	30th	March 4, 1927 – March 4, 1929	
James Kerr	Democratic	28th	March 4, 1889 – March 4, 1891	
Winthrop W. Ketcham	Republican	12th	March 4, 1875 – July 19, 1876	Resigned after being appointed judge of the United States District Court for the Western District of Pennsylvania.
Edgar R Kiess	Republican	15th	March 4, 1913 – March 4, 1923	Died.
Edgar R Kiess	Republican	16th	March 4, 1923 – July 20, 1930	Died.
John W Killinger	Republican	10th	March 4, 1859 – March 4, 1863	
John W Killinger	Republican	10th	March 4, 1871 – March 4, 1875	
John W Killinger	Republican	14th	March 4, 1877 – March 4, 1881	
Adam King	Jacksonian	10th	March 4, 1827 – March 4, 1833	
Henry King	Jacksonian	7th	March 4, 1831 – March 4, 1833	
Henry King	Jacksonian	8th	March 4, 1833 – March 4, 1835	
Karl C. King	Republican	8th	November 6, 1951 – January 3, 1957	
J. Roland Kinzer	Republican	10th	January 28, 1930 – January 3, 1945	
J. Roland Kinzer	Republican	9th	January 3, 1945 – January 3, 1947	
George W Kipp	Democratic	14th	March 4, 1907 – March 4, 1909	
George W Kipp	Democratic	14th	March 4, 1911 – July 24, 1911	Died.
William H. Kirkpatrick	Republican	26th	March 4, 1921 – March 4, 1923	
William S. Kirkpatrick	Republican	8th	March 4, 1897 – March 4, 1899	
John W. Kittera	Pro-Administration	5th	March 4, 1791 – March 4, 1793	
John W. Kittera	Pro-Administration	At-large	March 4, 1793 – March 4, 1795	
John W. Kittera	Federalist	7th	March 4, 1795 – March 3, 1801	
Thomas Kittera	Anti-Jacksonian	2nd	October 26, 1826 – March 4, 1827	
I. Clinton Kline	Republican	16th	March 4, 1921 – March 4, 1923	
Marcus C. L. Kline	Democratic	13th	March 4, 1903 – March 4, 1907	
John Klingensmith, Jr.	Jacksonian	19th	March 4, 1835 – March 4, 1837	
John Klingensmith, Jr.	Democratic	19th	March 4, 1837 – March 4, 1839	
Ron Klink	Democratic	4th	January 3, 1993 – January 3, 2001	
Robert Klotz	Democratic	11th	March 4, 1879 – March 4, 1883	
Jonathan Knight	Opposition	20th	March 4, 1855 – March 4, 1857	
Joseph P. Kolter	Democratic	4th	January 3, 1983 – January 3, 1993	
William H. Koontz	Republican	16th	July 18, 1866 – March 4, 1869	
Peter H. Kostmayer	Democratic	8th	January 3, 1977 – January 3, 1981	
Peter H. Kostmayer	Democratic	8th	January 3, 1983 – January 3, 1993	
Jacob Krebs	Jacksonian	7th	December 4, 1826 – March 4, 1827	
Aaron S. Kreider	Republican	18th	March 4, 1913 – March 4, 1923	
George Kremer	Democratic-Republican	9th	March 4, 1823 – March 4, 1825	
George Kremer	Jacksonian	9th	March 4, 1825 – March 4, 1829	
George F. Kribbs	Democratic	28th	March 4, 1891 – March 4, 1895	
Joseph H. Kuhns	Whig	19th	March 4, 1851 – March 4, 1853	
Monroe H. Kulp	Republican	17th	March 4, 1895 – March 4, 1899	
John Christian Kunkel	Opposition	10th	March 4, 1855 – March 4, 1857	
John Christian Kunkel	Republican	10th	March 4, 1857 – March 4, 1859	
John C. Kunkel	Republican	19th	January 3, 1939 – January 3, 1945	
John C. Kunkel	Republican	18th	January 3, 1945 – January 3, 1951	
John C. Kunkel	Republican	16th	May 16, 1961 – December 30, 1966	Resigned.
J Banks Kurtz	Republican	21st	March 4, 1923 – March 4, 1933	
J Banks Kurtz	Republican	23rd	March 4, 1933 – January 3, 1935	
William H Kurtz	Democratic	15th	March 4, 1851 – March 4, 1853	
William H Kurtz	Democratic	16th	March 4, 1853 – March 4, 1855	
Abner Lacock	Democratic-Republican	11th	March 4, 1811 – March 4, 1813	
Daniel F. Lafean	Republican	20th	March 4, 1903 – March 4, 1913	
Daniel F. Lafean	Republican	At-large	March 4, 1915 – March 4, 1917	
John A. Lafore, Jr.	Republican	13th	November 5, 1957 – January 3, 1961	
Conor Lamb	Democratic	18th	March 13, 2018 – January 3, 2019	Switched districts.
Conor Lamb	Democratic	17th	January 3, 2019 – January 3, 2023	Retired to run for U.S. senator.
James Landy	Democratic	3rd	March 4, 1857 – March 4, 1859	
J. N. Langham	Republican	27th	March 4, 1909 – March 4, 1915	
John Laporte	Jacksonian	17th	March 4, 1833 – March 4, 1837	
George V. E Lawrence	Republican	24th	March 4, 1865 – March 4, 1869	
George V. E Lawrence	Republican	24th	March 4, 1883 – March 4, 1885	
Joseph Lawrence	Anti-Jacksonian	15th	March 4, 1825 – March 4, 1829	
Joseph Lawrence	Whig	21st	March 4, 1841 – April 17, 1842	Died.
Jesse Lazear	Democratic	20th	March 4, 1861 – March 4, 1863	
Jesse Lazear	Democratic	24th	March 4, 1863 – March 4, 1865	
Raymond F. Lederer	Democratic	3rd	January 3, 1977 – April 29, 1981	Resigned.
Robert E. Lee	Democratic	12th	March 4, 1911 – March 4, 1915	
Summer Lee	Democratic	12th	January 3, 2023 – present	Incumbent
J. Russell Leech	Republican	20th	March 4, 1927 – January 29, 1932	resigned on appointment as member of US Board of Tax Appeals
Isaac Leet	Democratic	21st	March 4, 1839 – March 4, 1841	
Joseph Lefever	Democratic-Republican	3rd	March 4, 1811 – March 4, 1813	
William E. Lehman	Democratic	1st	March 4, 1861 – March 4, 1863	
Michael Leib	Democratic-Republican	2nd	March 4, 1799 – March 4, 1803	Resigned.
Michael Leib	Democratic-Republican	1st	March 4, 1803 – February 14, 1806	Resigned.
Owen D. Leib	Democratic	11th	March 4, 1845 – March 4, 1847	
Paul Leidy	Democratic	12th	December 7, 1857 – March 4, 1859	
George G. Leiper	Jacksonian	4th	March 4, 1829 – March 4, 1831	
John Leisenring	Republican	12th	March 4, 1895 – March 4, 1897	
John T. Lenahan	Democratic	11th	March 4, 1907 – March 4, 1909	
Fred C. Leonard	Republican	16th	March 4, 1895 – March 4, 1897	
John V. Lesher	Democratic	16th	March 4, 1913 – March 4, 1921	
Lewis C. Levin	Know Nothing	1st	March 4, 1845 – March 4, 1851	
Fred E. Lewis	Republican	At-large	March 4, 1913 – March 4, 1915	
Robert J. Lewis	Republican	19th	March 4, 1901 – March 4, 1903	
Norton L. Lichtenwalner	Democratic	14th	March 4, 1931 – March 4, 1933	
Franklin H. Lichtenwalter	Republican	8th	September 9, 1947 – January 3, 1951	
Michael Liebel, Jr.	Democratic	25th	March 4, 1915 – March 4, 1917	
Mial E. Lilley	Republican	14th	March 4, 1905 – March 4, 1907	
William Lilly	Republican	At-large	March 4, 1893 – December 1, 1893	Died.
James F. Lind	Democratic	21st	January 3, 1949 – January 3, 1953	
Henry Logan	Jacksonian	11th	March 4, 1835 – March 4, 1837	
Henry Logan	Democratic	11th	March 4, 1837 – March 4, 1839	
J. Washington Logue	Democratic	6th	March 4, 1913 – March 4, 1915	
Henry C. Longnecker	Republican	7th	March 4, 1859 – March 4, 1861	
Christian Lower	Democratic-Republican	3rd	March 4, 1805 – December 19, 1806	Died.
John B. C. Lucas	Democratic-Republican	11th	March 4, 1803 – ????, 1805	Resigned before the assembling of the 9th Congress to become district judge of the United States District Court for the District of Louisiana.
Aaron Lyle	Democratic-Republican	10th	March 4, 1809 – March 4, 1813	
Aaron Lyle	Democratic-Republican	12th	March 4, 1813 – March 4, 1817	
John Lynch	Democratic	12th	March 4, 1887 – March 4, 1889	
Ryan Mackenzie	Republican	7th	January 3, 2025 – present	Incumbent
Levi A. Mackey	Democratic	20th	March 4, 1875 – March 4, 1879	
Samuel Maclay	Democratic-Republican	6th	March 4, 1795 – March 4, 1797	
William Maclay	Democratic-Republican	5th	March 4, 1815 – March 4, 1819	
William P. Maclay	Democratic-Republican	9th	October 8, 1816 – March 4, 1821	
James T. Maffett	Republican	25th	March 4, 1887 – March 4, 1889	
James M. Magee	Republican	35th	March 4, 1923 – March 4, 1927	
John A. Magee	Democratic	15th	March 4, 1873 – March 4, 1875	
Frederick W. Magrady	Republican	17th	March 4, 1925 – March 4, 1933	
Thaddeus M Mahon	Republican	18th	March 4, 1893 – March 4, 1903	
Thaddeus M Mahon	Republican	17th	March 4, 1903 – March 4, 1907	
Levi Maish	Democratic	19th	March 4, 1875 – March 4, 1879	
Levi Maish	Democratic	19th	March 4, 1887 – March 4, 1891	
Franklin J. Maloney	Republican	4th	January 3, 1947 – January 3, 1949	
Job Mann	Jacksonian	18th	March 4, 1835 – March 4, 1837	
Job Mann	Democratic	19th	March 4, 1847 – March 4, 1851	
Joel K. Mann	Jacksonian	5th	March 4, 1831 – March 4, 1835	
Albert G. Marchand	Democratic	19th	March 4, 1839 – March 4, 1843	
David Marchand	Democratic-Republican	11th	March 4, 1817 – March 4, 1821	
Marjorie Margolies-Mezvinsky	Democratic	13th	January 3, 1993 – January 3, 1995	Lost re-election.
Tom Marino	Republican	10th	January 3, 2011 – January 3, 2019	Redistricted.
Tom Marino	Republican	12th	January 3, 2019 – January 23, 2019	Resigned.
Philip S Markley	Democratic-Republican	5th	March 4, 1823 – March 4, 1825	
Philip S Markley	Anti-Jacksonian	5th	March 4, 1825 – March 4, 1827	
Marc L. Marks	Republican	24th	January 3, 1977 – January 3, 1983	
Alem Marr	Jacksonian	9th	March 4, 1829 – March 4, 1831	
Frank Mascara	Democratic	20th	January 3, 1995 – January 3, 2003	
Charles Matthews	Republican	24th	March 4, 1911 – March 4, 1913	
William McAleer	Democratic	3rd	March 4, 1891 – March 4, 1895	
William McAleer	Democratic	3rd	March 4, 1897 – March 4, 1901	
Archibald McAllister	Democratic	17th	March 4, 1863 – March 4, 1865	
Joseph A. McArdle	Democratic	33rd	January 3, 1939 – January 5, 1942	Resigned to serve on Pittsburgh City Council.
Moses McClean	Democratic	15th	March 4, 1845 – March 4, 1847	
William McClelland	Democratic	24th	March 4, 1871 – March 4, 1873	
Blair McClenachan	Democratic-Republican	2nd	March 4, 1797 – March 4, 1799	
Charles McClure	Democratic	13th	March 4, 1837 – March 4, 1839	
Charles McClure	Democratic	13th	December 7, 1840 – March 4, 1841	
Samuel K. McConnell, Jr.	Republican	17th	January 18, 1944 – January 3, 1945	Resigned.
Samuel K. McConnell, Jr.	Republican	16th	January 3, 1945 – January 3, 1953	Resigned.
Samuel K. McConnell, Jr.	Republican	13th	January 3, 1953 – September 1, 1957	Resigned.
Henry C. McCormick	Republican	16th	March 4, 1887 – March 4, 1891	
Robert McCoy	Jacksonian	11th	November 22, 1831 – March 4, 1833	
George D. McCreary	Republican	6th	March 4, 1903 – March 4, 1913	
William McCreery	Democratic	15th	March 4, 1829 – March 4, 1831	
George McCulloch	Democratic	14th	November 20, 1839 – March 4, 1841	
John McCulloch	Whig	18th	March 4, 1853 – March 4, 1855	
Welty McCullogh	Republican	21st	March 4, 1887 – March 4, 1889	
Thomas G. McCullough	Federalist	5th	October 17, 1820 – March 4, 1821	
Joseph M. McDade	Republican	10th	January 3, 1963 – January 3, 1999	
Alexander McDowell	Republican	At-large	March 4, 1893 – March 4, 1895	
John McDowell	Republican	31st	January 3, 1939 – January 3, 1941	
John McDowell	Republican	29th	January 3, 1947 – January 3, 1949	
Louis T. McFadden	Republican	14th	March 4, 1915 – March 4, 1923	
Louis T. McFadden	Republican	15th	March 4, 1923 – January 3, 1935	
Robert N. McGarvey	Republican	2nd	January 3, 1947 – January 3, 1949	
Herbert J. McGlinchey	Democratic	6th	January 3, 1945 – January 3, 1947	
James P. McGranery	Democratic	2nd	January 3, 1937 – November 17, 1943	Resigned after being appointed an assistant to the Attorney General.
Paul McHale	Democratic	15th	January 3, 1993 – January 3, 1999	
John G. McHenry	Democratic	16th	March 4, 1907 – December 27, 1912	Died.
Abraham R. McIlvaine	Whig	7th	March 4, 1843 – March 4, 1849	
Ebenezer McJunkin	Republican	23rd	March 4, 1871 – ????, 1874/1875	
Samuel McKean	Democratic-Republican	9th	March 4, 1823 – March 4, 1825	
Samuel McKean	Jacksonian	9th	March 4, 1825 – March 4, 1829	
Thomas M. T McKennan	Anti-Masonic	15th	March 4, 1831 – March 4, 1833	
Thomas M. T McKennan	Anti-Masonic	21st	March 4, 1833 – March 4, 1839	
Thomas M. T McKennan	Whig	21st	May 30, 1842 – March 4, 1843	
Jacob K. McKenty	Democratic	8th	December 3, 1860 – March 4, 1861	
Robert McKnight	Republican	22nd	March 4, 1859 – March 4, 1863	
James X. McLanahan	Democratic	16th	March 4, 1849 – March 4, 1853	
Patrick McLane	Democratic	10th	March 4, 1919 – February 25, 1921	Lost election contest to John R. Farr.
Joseph McLaughlin	Republican	At-large	March 4, 1917 – March 4, 1919	
Joseph McLaughlin	Republican	At-large	March 4, 1921 – March 4, 1923	
John McNair	Democratic	5th	March 4, 1851 – March 4, 1855	
Edward McPherson	Republican	17th	March 4, 1859 – March 4, 1863	
James McSherry	Federalist	5th	March 4, 1821 – March 4, 1823	
Pat Meehan	Republican	7th	January 3, 2011 – April 27, 2018	Resigned.
Franklin Menges	Republican	22nd	March 4, 1925 – March 4, 1931	
Ulysses Mercur	Republican	13th	March 4, 1865 – December 2, 1872	Resigned after being appointed as judge of the Supreme Court of Pennsylvania.
Dan Meuser	Republican	9th	January 3, 2019 – present	Incumbent
Benjamin F. Meyers	Democratic	16th	March 4, 1871 – March 4, 1873	
Ner Middleswarth	Whig	10th	March 4, 1853 – March 4, 1855	
Daniel H. Miller	Democratic-Republican	3rd	March 4, 1823 – March 4, 1825	
Daniel H. Miller	Jacksonian	3rd	March 4, 1825 – March 4, 1831	
George F. Miller	Republican	14th	March 4, 1865 – March 4, 1869	
Jesse Miller	Jacksonian	13th	March 4, 1833 – October 30, 1836	Resigned to become the First Auditor of the United States Department of the Treasury.
Samuel H Miller	Republican	26th	March 4, 1881 – March 4, 1885	
Samuel H Miller	Republican	28th	March 4, 1915 – March 4, 1917	
Thomas B. Miller	Republican	12th	May 19, 1942 – January 3, 1945	
William H. Miller	Democratic	14th	March 4, 1863 – March 4, 1865	
William H. Milliken, Jr.	Republican	7th	January 3, 1959 – January 3, 1965	
William Millward	Opposition	3rd	March 4, 1855 – March 4, 1857	
William Millward	Republican	4th	March 4, 1859 – March 4, 1861	
James Milnor	Federalist	1st	March 4, 1811 – March 4, 1813	
William Milnor	Federalist	2nd	March 4, 1807 – March 4, 1811	
William Milnor	Federalist	1st	March 4, 1815 – March 4, 1817	
William Milnor	Federalist	1st	March 4, 1819 – May 8, 1822	Resigned.
Charles Miner	Anti-Jacksonian	4th	March 4, 1825 – March 4, 1829	
James S. Mitchell	Democratic-Republican	4th	March 4, 1821 – March 4, 1823	
James S. Mitchell	Democratic-Republican	10th	March 4, 1823 – March 4, 1825	
James S. Mitchell	Jacksonian	10th	March 4, 1825 – March 4, 1827	
John I. Mitchell	Republican	16th	March 4, 1877 – March 4, 1881	
John Mitchell	Jacksonian	12th	March 4, 1825 – March 4, 1829	
John Moffet	Democratic	3rd	March 4, 1869 – April 9, 1869	Lost contested election to Leonard Myers.
Daniel Montgomery, Jr.	Democratic-Republican	5th	March 4, 1807 – March 4, 1809	
John G. Montgomery	Democratic	12th	March 4, 1857 – April 24, 1857	Died.
William Montgomery	Democratic	20th	March 4, 1857 – March 4, 1861	
William Montgomery	Anti-Administration	At-large	March 4, 1793 – March 4, 1795	
Reuben O. Moon	Republican	4th	November 3, 1903 – March 4, 1913	
Henry D. Moore	Whig	3rd	March 4, 1849 – March 4, 1853	
J. Hampton Moore	Republican	3rd	November 6, 1906 – January 4, 1920	Resigned after being elected Mayor of Philadelphia.
Robert Moore	Democratic-Republican	15th	March 4, 1817 – March 4, 1821	
Samuel Moore	Democratic-Republican	6th	October 13, 1818 – May 20, 1822	
William S. Moore	Republican	24th	March 4, 1873 – March 4, 1875	
James K. Moorhead	Republican	21st	March 4, 1859 – March 4, 1863	
James K. Moorhead	Republican	22nd	March 4, 1863 – March 4, 1869	
William S. Moorhead	Democratic	28th	January 3, 1959 – January 3, 1963	
William S. Moorhead	Democratic	14th	January 3, 1963 – January 3, 1981	
Thomas E. Morgan	Democratic	24th	January 3, 1945 – January 3, 1953	
Thomas E. Morgan	Democratic	26th	January 3, 1953 – January 3, 1973	
Thomas E. Morgan	Democratic	22nd	January 3, 1973 – January 3, 1977	
John M. Morin	Republican	At-large	March 4, 1913 – March 4, 1915	
John M. Morin	Republican	31st	March 4, 1915 – March 4, 1923	
John M. Morin	Republican	34th	March 4, 1923 – March 4, 1929	
Theodore L. Moritz	Democratic	32nd	January 3, 1935 – January 3, 1937	
Daniel J. Morrell	Republican	17th	March 4, 1867 – March 4, 1871	
Edward de Veaux Morrell	Republican	5th	November 6, 1900 – March 4, 1907	
Edward J Morris	Whig	1st	March 4, 1843 – March 4, 1845	
Edward J Morris	Whig	2nd	March 4, 1857 – June 8, 1861	Resigned to become Minister to the Ottoman Empire.
Mathias Morris	Anti-Jacksonian	6th	March 4, 1835 – March 4, 1837	
Mathias Morris	Whig	6th	March 4, 1837 – March 4, 1839	
Samuel W. Morris	Democratic	17th	March 4, 1837 – March 4, 1841	
John A. Morrison	Democratic	7th	March 4, 1851 – March 4, 1853	
Guy L. Moser	Democratic	14th	January 3, 1937 – January 3, 1943	
James Mosgrove	Greenback	25th	March 4, 1881 – March 4, 1883	
Frederick A. Muhlenberg	Republican	13th	January 3, 1947 – January 3, 1949	
Frederick A. C. Muhlenberg	Pro-Administration	At-large	March 4, 1789 – March 4, 1791	
Frederick A. C. Muhlenberg	Anti-Administration	2nd	March 4, 1791 – March 4, 1793	
Frederick A. C. Muhlenberg	Anti-Administration	At-large	March 4, 1793 – March 4, 1795	
Frederick A. C. Muhlenberg	Democratic-Republican	2nd	March 4, 1795 – March 4, 1797	
Henry A. Muhlenberg	Democratic	8th	March 4, 1853 – January 9, 1854	Died.
Henry A. P. Muhlenberg	Jacksonian	7th	March 4, 1829 – March 4, 1833	Resigned to become United States Minister to the Austrian Empire.
Henry A. P. Muhlenberg	Jacksonian	9th	March 4, 1833 – March 4, 1837	Resigned to become United States Minister to the Austrian Empire.
Henry A. P. Muhlenberg	Democratic	9th	March 4, 1837 – February 8, 1838	Resigned to become United States Minister to the Austrian Empire.
Peter Muhlenberg	Anti-Administration	At-large	March 4, 1789 – March 4, 1791	
Peter Muhlenberg	Anti-Administration	At-large	March 4, 1793 – March 4, 1795	
Peter Muhlenberg	Democratic-Republican	4th	March 4, 1799 – March 4, 1801	
Michael J. Muldowney	Republican	32nd	March 4, 1933 – January 3, 1935	
Walter M. Mumma	Republican	18th	January 3, 1951 – January 3, 1953	Died.
Walter M. Mumma	Republican	16th	January 3, 1953 – February 25, 1961	Died.
Austin J Murphy	Democratic	22nd	January 3, 1977 – January 3, 1993	
Austin J Murphy	Democratic	20th	January 3, 1993 – January 3, 1995	
John W. Murphy	Democratic	11th	January 3, 1943 – January 3, 1945	Resigned to become judge of the United States District Court for the Middle District of Pennsylvania.
John W. Murphy	Democratic	10th	January 3, 1945 – July 17, 1946	Resigned to become judge of the United States District Court for the Middle District of Pennsylvania.
Patrick Murphy	Democratic	8th	January 3, 2007 – January 3, 2011	Lost re-election.
Timothy F. Murphy	Republican	18th	January 3, 2003 – October 21, 2017	Resigned.
John Murray	Democratic-Republican	10th	October 14, 1817 – March 4, 1821	First elected to finish Representative-elect David Scott's term.
Thomas Murray, Jr.	Democratic-Republican	10th	October 9, 1821 – March 4, 1823	First elected to finish Representative-elect William Cox Ellis's term.
John Murtha	Democratic	12th	February 5, 1974 – February 8, 2010	Died.
Ray Musto	Democratic	11th	April 9, 1980 – January 3, 1981	
Howard Mutchler	Democratic	8th	August 7, 1893 – March 4, 1895	
Howard Mutchler	Democratic	8th	March 4, 1901 – March 4, 1903	
William Mutchler	Democratic	10th	March 4, 1875 – March 4, 1877	
William Mutchler	Democratic	10th	March 4, 1881 – March 4, 1885	
William Mutchler	Democratic	8th	March 4, 1889 – June 23, 1893	Died.
Amos Myers	Republican	20th	March 4, 1863 – March 4, 1865	
Francis J. Myers	Democratic	6th	January 3, 1939 – January 3, 1945	
Gary A. Myers	Republican	25th	January 3, 1975 – January 3, 1979	
Leonard Myers	Republican	3rd	March 4, 1863 – March 4, 1869	
Leonard Myers	Republican	3rd	April 9, 1869 – March 4, 1875	Successfully challenged election of John Moffet.
Michael Myers	Democratic	1st	November 2, 1976 – October 2, 1980	Expelled as a result of the Abscam scandal.
Charles Naylor	Whig	3rd	June 29, 1837 – March 4, 1841	First elected to finish Representative-elect Francis J. Harper's term.
James S. Negley	Republican	22nd	March 4, 1869 – March 4, 1875	
James S. Negley	Republican	22nd	March 4, 1885 – March 4, 1887	
James L. Nelligan	Republican	11th	January 3, 1981 – January 3, 1983	
Henry Nes	Independent Democratic	15th	March 4, 1843 – March 4, 1845	
Henry Nes	Whig	15th	March 4, 1847 – September 10, 1850	Died.
Peter Newhard	Democratic	8th	March 4, 1839 – March 4, 1843	
Thomas D. Nicholls	Independent Democratic	10th	March 4, 1907 – March 4, 1911	
Robert N.C. Nix, Sr.	Democratic	4th	May 20, 1958 – January 3, 1963	
Robert N.C. Nix, Sr.	Democratic	2nd	January 3, 1963 – January 3, 1979	
Solomon T. North	Republican	27th	March 4, 1915 – March 4, 1917	
Charles O'Neill	Republican	2nd	March 4, 1863 – March 4, 1871	
Charles O'Neill	Republican	2nd	March 4, 1873 – November 25, 1893	Died.
Harry P. O'Neill	Democratic	10th	January 3, 1949 – January 3, 1953	
Alexander Ogle	Democratic-Republican	8th	March 4, 1817 – March 4, 1819	
Andrew J. Ogle	Whig	18th	March 4, 1849 – March 4, 1851	
Charles Ogle	Anti-Masonic	18th	March 4, 1837 – March 4, 1841	
Charles Ogle	Whig	18th	March 4, 1841 – May 10, 1841	Died.
Marlin E Olmsted	Republican	14th	March 4, 1897 – March 4, 1903	
Marlin E Olmsted	Republican	18th	March 4, 1903 – March 4, 1913	
Robert Orr, Jr.	Jacksonian	16th	October 11, 1825 – March 4, 1829	
Edwin S Osborne	Republican	At-large	March 4, 1885 – March 4, 1889	
Edwin S Osborne	Republican	12th	March 4, 1889 – March 4, 1891	
James H. Osmer	Republican	27th	March 4, 1879 – March 4, 1881	
Edward Overton, Jr.	Republican	15th	March 4, 1877 – March 4, 1881	
Asa Packer	Democratic	13th	March 4, 1853 – March 4, 1857	
Horace B. Packer	Republican	16th	March 4, 1897 – March 4, 1901	
John B. Packer	Republican	14th	March 4, 1869 – March 4, 1877	
A. Mitchell Palmer	Democratic	26th	March 4, 1909 – March 4, 1915	
Cyrus M. Palmer	Republican	13th	March 4, 1927 – March 4, 1929	
Henry W Palmer	Republican	12th	March 4, 1901 – March 4, 1903	
Henry W Palmer	Republican	11th	March 4, 1903 – March 4, 1907	
Henry W Palmer	Republican	11th	March 4, 1909 – March 4, 1911	
Andrew Parker	Democratic	17th	March 4, 1851 – March 4, 1853	
George R Patterson	Republican	13th	March 4, 1901 – March 4, 1903	Died.
George R Patterson	Republican	12th	March 4, 1903 – March 21, 1906	Died.
Thomas Patterson	Democratic-Republican	12th	March 4, 1817 – March 4, 1823	
Thomas Patterson	Democratic-Republican	15th	March 4, 1823 – March 4, 1825	
Charles E. Patton	Republican	21st	March 4, 1911 – March 4, 1915	
John Patton	Republican	24th	March 4, 1861 – March 4, 1863	
John Patton	Republican	20th	March 4, 1887 – March 4, 1889	
John D. Patton	Democratic	25th	March 4, 1883 – March 4, 1885	
Levi Pawling	Federalist	2nd	March 4, 1807 – March 4, 1811	
Lemuel Paynter	Democratic	1st	March 4, 1837 – March 4, 1841	
John J. Pearce	Opposition	15th	March 4, 1855 – March 4, 1857	
John J. Pearson	Anti-Jacksonian	24th	December 5, 1836 – March 4, 1837	
Scott Perry	Republican	4th	January 3, 2012 – January 3, 2019	Redistricted.
Scott Perry	Republican	10th	January 3, 2019 – present	Incumbent
John E. Peterson	Republican	5th	January 3, 1997 – January 3, 2009	
David Petrikin	Democratic	15th	March 4, 1837 – March 4, 1841	
S. Newton Pettis	Republican	20th	December 7, 1868 – March 4, 1869	
Darwin Phelps	Republican	23rd	March 4, 1869 – March 4, 1871	
Henry M. Phillips	Democratic	4th	March 4, 1857 – March 4, 1859	
John Phillips	Federalist	3rd	March 4, 1821 – March 4, 1823	
Thomas W. Phillips	Republican	25th	March 4, 1893 – March 4, 1897	
Thomas Wharton Phillips Jr.	Republican	26th	March 4, 1923 – March 4, 1927	
Robert Philson	Democratic-Republican	8th	March 4, 1819 – March 4, 1821	
William Piper	Democratic-Republican	7th	March 4, 1811 – March 4, 1813	
William Piper	Democratic-Republican	8th	March 4, 1813 – March 4, 1817	
Charles W. Pitman	Whig	14th	March 4, 1849 – March 4, 1851	
Joseph R. Pitts	Republican	16th	January 3, 1997 – January 3, 2017	
Todd R. Platts	Republican	19th	January 3, 2001 – January 3, 2013	Retired.
Arnold Plumer	Democratic	25th	March 4, 1837 – March 4, 1839	
Arnold Plumer	Democratic	25th	March 4, 1841 – March 4, 1843	
George Plumer	Democratic-Republican	11th	March 4, 1821 – March 4, 1823	
George Plumer	Democratic-Republican	17th	March 4, 1823 – March 4, 1825	
George Plumer	Jacksonian	17th	March 4, 1825 – March 4, 1827	
Rufus K. Polk	Democratic	17th	March 4, 1899 – March 5, 1902	Died.
James Pollock	Whig	13th	April 5, 1844 – March 4, 1849	
Henry K. Porter	Independent Republican	31st	March 4, 1903 – March 4, 1905	
John Porter	Democratic-Republican	1st	December 8, 1806 – March 4, 1811	
Stephen G. Porter	Republican	29th	March 4, 1911 – March 4, 1923	Died.
Stephen G. Porter	Republican	32nd	March 4, 1923 – June 27, 1930	Died.
George A. Post	Democratic	15th	March 4, 1883 – March 4, 1885	
William W. Potter	Democratic	14th	March 4, 1837 – October 28, 1839	Died.
David Potts Jr.	Anti-Masonic	4th	March 4, 1831 – March 4, 1839	
Joseph Powell	Democratic	15th	March 4, 1875 – March 4, 1877	
C. Frederick Pracht	Republican	5th	January 3, 1943 – January 3, 1945	
Charles C. Pratt	Republican	14th	March 4, 1909 – March 4, 1911	
Joseph M. Pratt	Republican	2nd	January 18, 1944 – January 3, 1945	
Stanley A. Prokop	Democratic	10th	January 3, 1959 – January 3, 1961	
John Pugh	Democratic-Republican	2nd	March 4, 1805 – March 4, 1809	
Samuel A Purviance	Opposition	22nd	March 4, 1855 – March 4, 1857	
Samuel A Purviance	Republican	22nd	March 4, 1857 – March 4, 1859	
James M. Quigley	Democratic	19th	January 3, 1955 – January 3, 1957	
James M. Quigley	Democratic	19th	January 3, 1959 – January 3, 1961	
James L. Quinn	Democratic	31st	January 3, 1935 – January 3, 1939	
Alexander Ramsey	Whig	14th	March 4, 1843 – March 4, 1847	
Robert Ramsey	Jacksonian	6th	March 4, 1833 – March 4, 1835	
Robert Ramsey	Whig	6th	March 4, 1841 – March 4, 1843	
William Ramsey	Jacksonian	11th	March 4, 1827 – September 29, 1831	Died.
William S. Ramsey	Democratic	13th	March 4, 1839 – October 17, 1840	Died.
Samuel J. Randall	Democratic	1st	March 4, 1863 – March 4, 1875	Died.
Samuel J. Randall	Democratic	3rd	March 4, 1875 – April 13, 1890	Died.
Harry C. Ransley	Republican	3rd	November 2, 1920 – March 4, 1933	
Harry C. Ransley	Republican	1st	March 4, 1933 – January 3, 1937	
Joseph W. Ray	Republican	24th	March 4, 1889 – March 4, 1891	
John Rea	Democratic-Republican	5th	May 11, 1813 – March 4, 1815	
Almon H Read	Democratic	17th	March 18, 1842 – March 4, 1843	Died.
Almon H Read	Democratic	12th	March 4, 1843 – June 3, 1844	Died.
John R. Reading	Democratic	5th	March 4, 1869 – April 13, 1870	Lost contested election to Caleb N. Taylor
John Reber	Republican	12th	May 23, 1919 – March 4, 1923	
Charles M. Reed	Whig	23rd	March 4, 1843 – March 4, 1845	
Robert R. Reed	Whig	20th	March 4, 1849 – March 4, 1851	
James B Reilly	Democratic	13th	March 4, 1875 – March 4, 1879	
James B Reilly	Democratic	13th	March 4, 1889 – March 4, 1895	
John Reilly	Democratic	17th	March 4, 1875 – March 4, 1877	
Wilson Reilly	Democratic	17th	March 4, 1857 – March 4, 1859	
Luther Reily	Democratic	10th	March 4, 1837 – March 4, 1839	
Guy Reschenthaler	Republican	14th	January 3, 2019 – present	Incumbent
John E. Reyburn	Republican	4th	February 18, 1890 – March 4, 1897	
John E. Reyburn	Republican	2nd	November 6, 1906 – March 31, 1907	Resigned to become Mayor of Philadelphia.
William S. Reyburn	Republican	2nd	May 23, 1911 – March 4, 1913	
John M. Reynolds	Republican	19th	March 4, 1905 – January 17, 1911	Resigned to become Lieutenant Governor of Pennsylvania.
George M. Rhodes	Democratic	13th	January 3, 1949 – January 3, 1953	
George M. Rhodes	Democratic	14th	January 3, 1953 – January 3, 1963	
George M. Rhodes	Democratic	6th	January 3, 1963 – January 3, 1969	
Robert F. Rich	Republican	16th	November 4, 1930 – January 3, 1943	
Robert F. Rich	Republican	15th	January 3, 1945 – January 3, 1951	
Jacob Richards	Democratic-Republican	1st	March 4, 1803 – March 4, 1809	
John Richards	Democratic-Republican	4th	March 4, 1795 – March 4, 1797	
Matthias Richards	Democratic-Republican	3rd	March 4, 1807 – March 4, 1811	
William E. Richardson	Democratic	14th	March 4, 1933 – January 3, 1937	
Hiram L. Richmond	Republican	20th	March 4, 1873 – March 4, 1875	
Tom Ridge	Republican	21st	January 3, 1983 – January 3, 1995	
John W. Rife	Republican	14th	March 4, 1889 – March 4, 1893	
David Ritchie	Whig	21st	March 4, 1853 – March 4, 1855	
David Ritchie	Opposition	21st	March 4, 1855 – March 4, 1857	
David Ritchie	Republican	21st	March 4, 1857 – March 4, 1859	
Donald L. Ritter	Republican	15th	January 3, 1979 – January 3, 1993	
John Ritter	Democratic	9th	March 4, 1843 – March 4, 1847	
Edward E Robbins	Republican	21st	March 4, 1897 – March 4, 1899	
Edward E Robbins	Republican	22nd	March 4, 1917 – January 25, 1919	Died.
John Robbins	Democratic	4th	March 4, 1849 – March 4, 1853	
John Robbins	Democratic	3rd	March 4, 1853 – March 4, 1855	
John Robbins	Democratic	5th	March 4, 1875 – March 4, 1877	
Anthony E Roberts	Know Nothing	9th	March 4, 1855 – March 4, 1857	
Anthony E Roberts	Republican	9th	March 4, 1857 – March 4, 1859	
Jonathan Roberts	Democratic-Republican	2nd	March 4, 1811 – February 24, 1814	Resigned after being elected to the US Senate.
John B. Robinson	Republican	6th	March 4, 1891 – March 4, 1897	
David F. Robison	Opposition	17th	March 4, 1855 – March 4, 1857	
Robert L. Rodgers	Republican	29th	January 3, 1939 – January 3, 1945	
Robert L. Rodgers	Republican	28th	January 3, 1945 – January 3, 1947	
William Rodman	Democratic-Republican	2nd	March 4, 1811 – March 4, 1813	
Thomas J Rogers	Democratic-Republican	6th	March 3, 1818 – March 4, 1823	
Thomas J Rogers	Democratic-Republican	8th	March 4, 1823 – April 20, 1824	Resigned.
Fred B. Rooney	Democratic	15th	July 30, 1963 – January 3, 1979	
John M. Rose	Republican	19th	March 4, 1917 – March 4, 1923	
John Ross	Democratic-Republican	2nd	March 4, 1809 – March 4, 1811	
John Ross	Democratic-Republican	6th	March 4, 1815 – February 24, 1818	Resigned to become president judge of the seventh judicial district of Pennsylvania.
Sobieski Ross	Republican	18th	March 4, 1873 – March 4, 1875	
Sobieski Ross	Republican	16th	March 4, 1875 – March 4, 1877	
Thomas Ross	Democratic	6th	March 4, 1849 – March 4, 1853	
John H. Rothermel	Democratic	13th	March 4, 1907 – March 4, 1915	
Keith Rothfus	Republican	12th	January 3, 2013 – January 3, 2019	Lost re-election.
Charles H. Rowland	Republican	21st	March 4, 1915 – March 4, 1919	
Arthur R. Rupley	Republican	At-large	March 4, 1913 – March 4, 1915	
James M. Russell	Whig	18th	December 21, 1841 – March 4, 1843	
Samuel L. Russell	Whig	17th	March 4, 1853 – March 4, 1855	
Albert G. Rutherford	Republican	15th	January 3, 1937 – August 10, 1941	Died.
James W. Ryan	Democratic	13th	March 4, 1899 – March 4, 1901	
John W. Ryon	Democratic	13th	March 4, 1879 – March 4, 1881	
Leon Sacks	Democratic	1st	January 3, 1937 – January 3, 1943	
Edmund W. Samuel	Republican	16th	March 4, 1905 – March 4, 1907	
Rick Santorum	Republican	18th	January 3, 1991 – January 3, 1995	
George W. Sarbacher Jr.	Republican	5th	January 3, 1947 – January 3, 1949	
Benjamin Say	Democratic-Republican	1st	November 16, 1808 – June 1809	Resigned.
John P. Saylor	Republican	26th	September 13, 1949 – January 3, 1953	
John P. Saylor	Republican	22nd	January 3, 1953 – January 3, 1973	
John P. Saylor	Republican	12th	January 3, 1973 – October 28, 1973	
Mary Gay Scanlon	Democratic	7th	November 6, 2018 – January 3, 2019	Redistricted.
Mary Gay Scanlon	Democratic	5th	January 3, 2019 – present	Incumbent
Thomas E. Scanlon	Democratic	30th	January 3, 1941 – January 3, 1943	
Thomas E. Scanlon	Democratic	16th	January 3, 1943 – January 3, 1945	
Gustav A. Schneebeli	Republican	26th	March 4, 1905 – March 4, 1907	
Herman T. Schneebeli	Republican	17th	April 26, 1960 – January 3, 1977	
Dick Schulze	Republican	5th	January 3, 1975 – January 3, 1993	
Allyson Schwartz	Democratic	13th	January 3, 2005 – January 3, 2015	Retired.
John Schwartz	Democratic	8th	March 4, 1859 – June 20, 1860	Died.
Richard S. Schweiker	Republican	13th	January 3, 1961 – January 3, 1969	
James P. Scoblick	Republican	10th	November 5, 1946 – January 3, 1949	
Glenni William Scofield	Republican	19th	March 4, 1863 – March 4, 1873	
Glenni William Scofield	Republican	At-large	March 4, 1873 – March 4, 1875	
Hardie Scott	Republican	3rd	January 3, 1947 – January 3, 1953	
Hugh Scott	Republican	7th	January 3, 1941 – January 3, 1945	Lost re-election.
Hugh Scott	Republican	6th	January 3, 1947 – January 3, 1959	Retired to run for United States Senator.
John R. K. Scott	Republican	At-large	March 4, 1915 – January 5, 1919	Resigned.
John Scott	Jacksonian	12th	March 4, 1829 – March 4, 1831	
Thomas Scott	Pro-Administration	At-large	March 4, 1789 – March 4, 1791	
Thomas Scott	Pro-Administration	At-large	March 4, 1793 – March 4, 1795	
William Lawrence Scott	Democratic	27th	March 4, 1885 – March 4, 1889	
George W. Scranton	Republican	12th	March 4, 1859 – March 24, 1861	Died.
Joseph A. Scranton	Republican	12th	March 4, 1881 – March 4, 1883	
Joseph A. Scranton	Republican	12th	March 4, 1885 – March 4, 1887	
Joseph A. Scranton	Republican	11th	March 4, 1889 – March 4, 1891	
Joseph A. Scranton	Republican	11th	March 4, 1893 – March 4, 1897	
William Scranton	Republican	10th	January 3, 1961 – January 3, 1963	
Edward Scull	Republican	17th	March 4, 1887 – March 4, 1889	
Edward Scull	Republican	20th	March 4, 1889 – March 4, 1893	
John Sergeant	Federalist	1st	October 10, 1815 – March 4, 1823	
John Sergeant	Anti-Jacksonian	2nd	March 4, 1827 – March 4, 1829	
John Sergeant	Whig	2nd	March 4, 1835 – September 15, 1841	Resigned.
Joe Sestak	Democratic	7th	January 3, 2007 – January 3, 2011	Retired.
Adam Seybert	Democratic-Republican	1st	October 10, 1809 – March 4, 1815	
Adam Seybert	Democratic-Republican	1st	March 4, 1817 – March 4, 1819	
William S. Shallenberger	Republican	24th	March 4, 1877 – March 4, 1883	
James Sheakley	Democratic	26th	March 4, 1875 – March 4, 1877	
Daniel Sheffer	Democratic	12th	March 4, 1837 – March 4, 1839	
John E. Sheridan	Democratic	4th	November 7, 1939 – January 3, 1947	
Don Sherwood	Republican	10th	January 3, 1999 – January 3, 2007	
Henry Sherwood	Democratic	18th	March 4, 1871 – March 4, 1873	
George Shiras III	Independent Republican	29th	March 4, 1903 – March 4, 1905	
Lazarus D. Shoemaker	Republican	12th	March 4, 1871 – March 4, 1875	
George W. Shonk	Republican	12th	March 4, 1891 – March 4, 1893	
Joseph B. Showalter	Republican	25th	April 20, 1897 – March 4, 1903	
Milton W Shreve	Republican	25th	March 4, 1913 – March 4, 1915	
Milton W Shreve	Republican	25th	March 4, 1919 – March 4, 1921	
Milton W Shreve	Independent Republican	25th	March 4, 1921 – March 4, 1923	
Milton W Shreve	Republican	29th	March 4, 1923 – March 4, 1933	
Joseph H. Shull	Democratic	26th	March 4, 1903 – March 4, 1905	
Elmer "Bud" Shuster	Republican	9th	January 3, 1973 – February 3, 2001	Resigned.
William "Bill" Shuster	Republican	9th	May 15, 2001 – January 3, 2019	Retired.
Joseph C. Sibley	Democratic	26th	March 4, 1893 – March 4, 1895	
Joseph C. Sibley	Democratic	27th	March 4, 1899 – March 4, 1901	
Joseph C. Sibley	Republican	27th	March 4, 1901 – March 4, 1903	
Joseph C. Sibley	Republican	28th	March 4, 1903 – March 4, 1907	
Thomas H Sill	Anti-Jacksonian	18th	January 13, 1826 – March 4, 1827	
Thomas H Sill	Anti-Jacksonian	18th	March 4, 1829 – March 4, 1831	
William Simonton	Whig	10th	March 4, 1839 – March 4, 1843	
Richard M. Simpson	Republican	18th	May 11, 1937 – January 3, 1945	Died.
Richard M. Simpson	Republican	17th	January 3, 1945 – January 3, 1953	Died.
Richard M. Simpson	Republican	18th	January 3, 1953 – January 7, 1960	Died.
William A. Sipe	Democratic	24th	December 5, 1892 – March 4, 1895	
Frank C. Sites	Democratic	19th	March 4, 1923 – March 4, 1925	
Samuel Sitgreaves	Federalist	4th	March 4, 1795 – ????, 1798	Resigned.
Edward L. Sittler Jr.	Republican	23rd	January 3, 1951 – January 3, 1953	
Amos Slaymaker	Federalist	3rd	October 11, 1814 – March 4, 1815	
John Smilie	Anti-Administration	At-large	March 4, 1793 – March 4, 1795	
John Smilie	Anti-Administration	11th	March 4, 1799 – March 4, 1803	
John Smilie	Anti-Administration	9th	March 4, 1803 – December 30, 1812	Died.
A. Herr Smith	Republican	9th	March 4, 1873 – March 4, 1885	
Francis R. Smith	Democratic	5th	January 3, 1941 – January 3, 1943	
George Smith	Democratic-Republican	5th	March 4, 1809 – March 4, 1813	
Isaac Smith	Democratic-Republican	10th	March 4, 1813 – March 4, 1815	
John T. Smith	Democratic	3rd	March 4, 1843 – March 4, 1845	
Joseph F. Smith	Democratic	3rd	July 21, 1981 – January 3, 1983	
Samuel A. Smith	Jacksonian	8th	October 13, 1829 – March 4, 1833	
Samuel Smith	Democratic-Republican	11th	November 7, 1805 – March 4, 1811	
Thomas Smith	Federalist	1st	March 4, 1815 – March 4, 1817	
William O. Smith	Republican	27th	March 4, 1903 – March 4, 1907	
Lloyd Smucker	Republican	16th	January 3, 2017 – January 3, 2019	Redistricted.
Lloyd Smucker	Republican	11th	January 3, 2019 – present	Incumbent
J. Buell Snyder	Democratic	24th	March 4, 1933 – January 3, 1945	Died.
J. Buell Snyder	Democratic	23rd	January 3, 1945 – February 24, 1946	Died.
John Snyder	Democratic	16th	March 4, 1841 – March 4, 1843	
William H. Sowden	Democratic	10th	March 4, 1885 – March 4, 1889	
Jacob Spangler	Democratic-Republican	4th	March 4, 1817 – April 20, 1818	Resigned to become Surveyor-General of Pennsylvania.
Peter M. Speer	Republican	28th	March 4, 1911 – March 4, 1913	
Robert M. Speer	Democratic	17th	March 4, 1871 – March 4, 1875	
Michael J. Stack	Democratic	6th	January 3, 1935 – January 3, 1939	
James A. Stahle	Republican	19th	March 4, 1895 – March 4, 1897	
William H. Stanton	Democratic	12th	November 7, 1876 – March 4, 1877	
S. Walter Stauffer	Republican	19th	January 3, 1953 – January 3, 1955	
S. Walter Stauffer	Republican	19th	January 3, 1957 – January 3, 1959	
Henry J. Steele	Democratic	26th	March 4, 1915 – March 4, 1921	
William Stenger	Democratic	18th	March 4, 1875 – March 4, 1879	
Philander Stephens	Jacksonian	9th	March 4, 1829 – March 4, 1833	
John B. Sterigere	Jacksonian	5th	March 4, 1827 – March 4, 1831	
Bruce F. Sterling	Democratic	23rd	March 4, 1917 – March 4, 1919	
Thaddeus Stevens	Whig	8th	March 4, 1849 – March 4, 1853	
Thaddeus Stevens	Republican	9th	March 4, 1859 – August 11, 1868	Died.
James S. Stevenson	Jacksonian	16th	March 4, 1825 – March 4, 1829	
Andrew Stewart	Democratic-Republican	13th	March 4, 1821 – March 4, 1823	
Andrew Stewart	Democratic-Republican	14th	March 4, 1823 – March 4, 1825	
Andrew Stewart	Jacksonian	14th	March 4, 1825 – March 4, 1827	
Andrew Stewart	Anti-Jacksonian	14th	March 4, 1827 – March 4, 1829	
Andrew Stewart	Anti-Masonic	14th	March 4, 1831 – March 4, 1833	
Andrew Stewart	Anti-Masonic	20th	March 4, 1833 – March 4, 1835	
Andrew Stewart	Whig	18th	March 4, 1843 – March 4, 1849	
Andrew Stewart	Republican	24th	March 4, 1891 – February 26, 1892	Lost contested election
John Stewart	Democratic-Republican	8th	January 15, 1801 – March 4, 1803	
John Stewart	Democratic-Republican	6th	March 4, 1803 – March 4, 1805	
William Stewart	Republican	23rd	March 4, 1857 – March 4, 1861	
John D Stiles	Democratic	7th	June 3, 1862 – March 4, 1863	
John D Stiles	Democratic	6th	March 4, 1863 – March 4, 1865	
John D Stiles	Democratic	6th	March 4, 1869 – March 4, 1871	
Edward L. Stokes	Republican	2nd	November 3, 1931 – March 4, 1933	
Edward L. Stokes	Republican	6th	March 4, 1933 – January 3, 1935	
Charles W. Stone	Republican	27th	November 4, 1890 – March 4, 1899	
William A. Stone	Republican	23rd	March 4, 1891 – November 8, 1898	Resigned to become Governor of Pennsylvania.
John B Storm	Democratic	11th	March 4, 1871 – March 4, 1875	
John B Storm	Democratic	11th	March 4, 1883 – March 4, 1887	
Christian M. Straub	Democratic	11th	March 4, 1853 – March 4, 1855	
James D. Strawbridge	Republican	13th	March 4, 1873 – March 4, 1875	
John Strohm	Whig	8th	March 4, 1845 – March 4, 1849	
Nathan L. Strong	Republican	27th	March 4, 1917 – January 3, 1935	
William Strong	Democratic	9th	March 4, 1847 – March 4, 1851	
Myer Strouse	Democratic	10th	March 4, 1863 – March 4, 1867	
Howard W. Stull	Republican	20th	April 26, 1932 – March 4, 1933	
John C. Sturtevant	Republican	26th	March 4, 1897 – March 4, 1899	
Patrick J. Sullivan	Republican	34th	March 4, 1929 – March 4, 1933	
Joel B. Sutherland	Jacksonian	1st	March 4, 1827 – March 4, 1837	
John Swanwick	Democratic-Republican	1st	March 4, 1795 – August 1, 1798	Died.
Joshua W. Swartz	Republican	19th	March 4, 1925 – March 4, 1927	
J. Howard Swick	Republican	26th	March 4, 1927 – January 3, 1935	
William I. Swoope	Republican	23rd	March 4, 1923 – March 4, 1927	
Guy J. Swope	Democratic	19th	January 3, 1937 – January 3, 1939	
John A Swope	Democratic	19th	December 23, 1884 – March 4, 1885	
John A Swope	Democratic	19th	November 3, 1885 – March 4, 1887	
Adamson Tannehill	Democratic-Republican	14th	March 4, 1813 – March 4, 1815	
Christian Tarr	Democratic-Republican	13th	March 4, 1817 – March 4, 1821	
Alexander W. Taylor	Republican	21st	March 4, 1873 – March 4, 1875	
Caleb N Taylor	Republican	5th	March 4, 1867 – March 4, 1869	
Caleb N Taylor	Republican	5th	April 13, 1870 – March 4, 1871	Successfully contested the election of John R. Reading.
Henry W Temple	Progressive	24th	March 4, 1913 – March 4, 1915	
Henry W Temple	Republican	24th	November 2, 1915 – March 4, 1923	Elected to finish the term of Representative-elect William M. Brown.
Henry W Temple	Republican	25th	March 4, 1923 – March 4, 1933	Elected to finish the term of Representative-elect William M. Brown.
Thomas W. Templeton	Republican	11th	March 4, 1917 – March 4, 1919	
John K. Tener	Republican	24th	March 4, 1909 – January 16, 1911	Resigned to become Governor of Pennsylvania.
Martin R. Thayer	Republican	5th	March 4, 1863 – March 4, 1867	
Richard Thomas	Federalist	3rd	March 4, 1795 – March 4, 1801	
Glenn G. T. Thompson	Republican	5th	January 3, 2009 – January 3, 2019	Redistricted.
Glenn G. T. Thompson	Republican	15th	January 3, 2019 – present	Incumbent
James Thompson	Democratic	23rd	March 4, 1845 – March 4, 1851	
John M. Thompson	Republican	23rd	???? – March 4, 1875	
John M. Thompson	Republican	26th	March 4, 1877 – March 4, 1879	
Alexander Thomson	Democratic-Republican	13th	December 6, 1824 – March 4, 1825	Resigned.
Alexander Thomson	Jacksonian	13th	March 4, 1825 – May 1, 1826	Resigned.
Joseph E. Thropp	Republican	20th	March 4, 1899 – March 4, 1901	
Harve Tibbott	Republican	27th	January 3, 1939 – January 3, 1945	
Harve Tibbott	Republican	26th	January 3, 1945 – January 3, 1949	
John Tod	Democratic-Republican	8th	March 4, 1821 – March 4, 1823	Resigned after becoming judge of the Court of Common Pleas for the 16th judicial district.
John Tod	Democratic-Republican	13th	March 4, 1823 – ????, 1824	Resigned after becoming judge of the Court of Common Pleas for the 16th judicial district.
Lemuel Todd	Opposition	16th	March 4, 1855 – March 4, 1857	
Lemuel Todd	Republican	At-large	March 4, 1873 – March 4, 1875	
George W. Toland	Whig	2nd	March 4, 1837 – March 4, 1843	
Herman Toll	Democratic	6th	January 3, 1959 – January 3, 1963	
Herman Toll	Democratic	4th	January 3, 1963 – January 3, 1967	
Pat Toomey	Republican	15th	January 3, 1999 – January 3, 2005	Retired to run for United States Senator.
Charles C. Townsend	Republican	25th	March 4, 1889 – March 4, 1891	
Washington Townsend	Republican	7th	March 4, 1869 – March 4, 1875	
Washington Townsend	Republican	6th	March 4, 1875 – March 4, 1877	
Henry W. Tracy	Independent Republican	13th	March 4, 1863 – March 4, 1865	
Michael C. Trout	Democratic	23rd	March 4, 1853 – March 4, 1855	
William I. Troutman	Republican	At-large	January 3, 1943 – January 2, 1945	Resigned to become member of Pennsylvania State Senate.
Jacob Turney	Democratic	21st	March 4, 1875 – March 4, 1879	
C. Murray Turpin	Republican	12th	June 24, 1929 – January 3, 1937	
Job R. Tyson	Whig	2nd	March 4, 1855 – March 4, 1857	
Daniel Udree	Democratic-Republican	7th	October 12, 1813 – March 4, 1815	
Daniel Udree	Democratic-Republican	7th	December 26, 1820 – March 4, 1821	
Daniel Udree	Democratic-Republican	7th	December 10, 1822 – March 4, 1825	
Daniel M. Van Auken	Democratic	11th	March 4, 1867 – March 4, 1871	
Espy Van Horne	Jacksonian	9th	March 4, 1825 – March 4, 1829	
Isaac Van Horne	Democratic-Republican	4th	March 4, 1801 – March 4, 1803	
Isaac Van Horne	Democratic-Republican	2nd	March 4, 1803 – March 4, 1805	
James E. Van Zandt	Republican	23rd	January 3, 1939 – September 24, 1943	Resigned to join the United States Navy.
James E. Van Zandt	Republican	22nd	January 3, 1947 – January 3, 1953	
James E. Van Zandt	Republican	20th	January 3, 1953 – January 3, 1963	
William S. Vare	Republican	1st	May 24, 1912 – March 4, 1927	
Albert C. Vaughn	Republican	8th	January 3, 1951 – September 1, 1951	Died.
Richard Vaux	Democratic	3rd	May 20, 1890 – March 4, 1891	
John P. Verree	Republican	3rd	March 4, 1859 – March 4, 1863	
Joseph P. Vigorito	Democratic	24th	January 3, 1965 – January 3, 1977	
David D Wagener	Jacksonian	7th	March 4, 1833 – March 4, 1837	
David D Wagener	Democratic	7th	March 4, 1837 – March 4, 1841	
Alfred M. Waldron	Republican	3rd	March 4, 1933 – January 3, 1935	
Doug Walgren	Democratic	18th	January 3, 1977 – January 3, 1991	
Robert J. C. Walker	Republican	16th	March 4, 1881 – March 4, 1883	
Robert S. Walker	Republican	16th	January 3, 1977 – January 3, 1997	
James M. Wallace	Democratic-Republican	3rd	October 10, 1815 – March 4, 1821	First elected to finish Representative-elect Amos Ellmaker's term.
John W Wallace	Republican	23rd	March 4, 1861 – March 4, 1863	
John W Wallace	Republican	24th	March 4, 1875 – March 4, 1877	
Robert Waln	Federalist	1st	December 3, 1798 – March 4, 1801	
Francis E. Walter	Democratic	21st	March 4, 1933 – January 3, 1945	Died.
Francis E. Walter	Democratic	20th	January 3, 1945 – January 3, 1953	Died.
Francis E. Walter	Democratic	15th	January 3, 1953 – May 31, 1963	Died.
Anderson H Walters	Republican	At-large	March 4, 1913 – March 4, 1915	
Anderson H Walters	Republican	At-large	March 4, 1919 – March 4, 1923	
Anderson H Walters	Republican	20th	March 4, 1925 – March 4, 1927	
Irving P Wanger	Republican	7th	March 4, 1893 – March 4, 1903	Lost re-election.
Irving P Wanger	Republican	8th	March 4, 1903 – March 4, 1911	Lost re-election.
William Ward	Republican	6th	March 4, 1877 – March 4, 1883	
John H. Ware III	Republican	5th	March 4, 1973 – January 3, 1975	
George Watkins	Republican	7th	January 3, 1965 – January 3, 1967	Died.
George Watkins	Republican	9th	January 3, 1967 – August 7, 1970	Died.
John G. Watmough	Anti-Jacksonian	3rd	March 4, 1831 – March 4, 1835	
Laurence H. Watres	Republican	11th	March 4, 1923 – March 4, 1931	
Henry W Watson	Republican	8th	March 4, 1915 – March 4, 1923	Died.
Henry W Watson	Republican	9th	March 4, 1923 – August 27, 1933	Died.
Lewis F Watson	Republican	27th	March 4, 1877 – March 4, 1879	
Lewis F Watson	Republican	27th	March 4, 1881 – March 4, 1883	
Lewis F Watson	Republican	27th	March 4, 1889 – August 25, 1890	Died.
Isaac Wayne	Federalist	4th	March 4, 1823 – March 4, 1825	
James D. Weaver	Republican	24th	January 3, 1963 – January 3, 1965	
Samuel A. Weiss	Democratic	31st	January 3, 1941 – January 3, 1943	Resigned to become judge of court of common pleas of Allegheny County
Samuel A. Weiss	Democratic	30th	January 3, 1943 – January 3, 1945	Resigned to become judge of court of common pleas of Allegheny County
Samuel A. Weiss	Democratic	33rd	January 3, 1945 – January 7, 1946	Resigned to become judge of court of common pleas of Allegheny County
Curt Weldon	Republican	7th	January 3, 1987 – January 3, 2007	
George A. Welsh	Republican	6th	March 4, 1923 – May 31, 1932	Resigned to become a district court judge.
George M. Wertz	Republican	20th	March 4, 1923 – March 4, 1925	
John Westbrook	Democratic	7th	March 4, 1841 – March 4, 1843	
J. Irving Whalley	Republican	18th	November 8, 1960 – January 3, 1963	
J. Irving Whalley	Republican	12th	January 3, 1963 – January 3, 1973	
Nelson P. Wheeler	Republican	28th	March 4, 1907 – March 4, 1911	
Alexander C. White	Republican	25th	March 4, 1885 – March 4, 1887	
Allison White	Democratic	15th	March 4, 1857 – March 4, 1859	
Harry White	Republican	25th	March 4, 1877 – March 4, 1881	
James Whitehill	Democratic-Republican	3rd	March 4, 1813 – September 1, 1814	Resigned.
John Whitehill	Democratic-Republican	3rd	March 4, 1803 – March 4, 1807	
Robert Whitehill	Democratic-Republican	4th	November 7, 1805 – March 4, 1813	Died.
Robert Whitehill	Democratic-Republican	5th	March 4, 1813 – April 8, 1813	Died.
John Whiteside	Democratic-Republican	3rd	March 4, 1815 – March 4, 1819	
David Wilmot	Democratic	12th	March 4, 1845 – March 4, 1851	
Susan Wild	Democratic	15th	November 6, 2018 – January 3, 2019	Redistricted.
Susan Wild	Democratic	7th	January 3, 2019 – January 3, 2025	Lost re-election
Jonathan Williams	Democratic-Republican	1st	March 4, 1815 – May 16, 1815	Died.
Lawrence G. Williams	Republican	7th	January 3, 1967 – January 3, 1975	
Morgan B. Williams	Republican	12th	March 4, 1897 – March 4, 1899	
Thomas Williams	Republican	23rd	March 4, 1863 – March 4, 1869	
Henry Wilson	Democratic-Republican	7th	March 4, 1823 – March 4, 1825	
Henry Wilson	Jacksonian	7th	March 4, 1825 – August 24, 1826	Died.
James Wilson	Democratic-Republican	11th	March 4, 1823 – March 4, 1825	
James Wilson	Jacksonian	11th	March 4, 1825 – March 4, 1829	
John H. Wilson	Democratic	22nd	March 4, 1919 – March 4, 1921	
Stephen F. Wilson	Republican	18th	March 4, 1865 – March 4, 1869	
Thomas Wilson	Democratic-Republican	15th	May 14, 1813 – March 4, 1817	
William Wilson	Democratic-Republican	10th	March 4, 1815 – March 4, 1819	
William B. Wilson	Democratic	15th	March 4, 1907 – March 4, 1913	
William H. Wilson	Republican	2nd	January 3, 1935 – January 3, 1937	
Morgan R. Wise	Democratic	21st	March 4, 1879 – March 4, 1883	
William H. Witte	Democratic	4th	March 4, 1853 – March 4, 1855	
George Wolf	Democratic-Republican	8th	December 9, 1824 – March 4, 1825	
George Wolf	Jacksonian	8th	March 4, 1825 – ????, 1829	Resigned before the convening of the 21st Congress.
James Wolfenden	Republican	8th	November 6, 1928 – January 3, 1945	
James Wolfenden	Republican	7th	January 3, 1945 – January 3, 1947	
Simon P. Wolverton	Democratic	17th	March 4, 1891 – March 4, 1895	
Alan Wood Jr.	Republican	7th	March 4, 1875 – March 4, 1877	
John Wood	Republican	5th	March 4, 1859 – March 4, 1861	
Henry Woods	Federalist	10th	March 4, 1799 – March 4, 1803	
John Woods	Federalist	14th	March 4, 1815 – March 4, 1817	
George W. Woodward	Democratic	12th	November 21, 1867 – March 4, 1871	
Ephraim M. Woomer	Republican	14th	March 4, 1893 – March 4, 1897	
Ludwig Worman	Federalist	7th	March 4, 1821 – October 17, 1822	Died.
Charles F Wright	Republican	15th	March 4, 1899 – March 4, 1903	
Charles F Wright	Republican	14th	March 4, 1903 – March 4, 1905	
Hendrick B Wright	Democratic	12th	March 4, 1853 – March 4, 1855	
Hendrick B Wright	Democratic	12th	July 4, 1861 – March 4, 1863	
Hendrick B Wright	Democratic	12th	March 4, 1877 – March 4, 1879	
Hendrick B Wright	Greenback	12th	March 4, 1879 – March 4, 1881	
James A. Wright	Democratic	34th	January 3, 1941 – January 3, 1943	
James A. Wright	Democratic	32nd	January 3, 1943 – January 3, 1945	
Myron B. Wright	Republican	15th	March 4, 1889 – November 13, 1894	Died.
John Wurts	Jacksonian	1st	March 4, 1825 – March 4, 1827	
Adam M. Wyant	Republican	22nd	March 4, 1921 – March 4, 1923	
Adam M. Wyant	Republican	31st	March 4, 1923 – March 4, 1933	
Henry Wynkoop	Pro-Administration	At-large	March 4, 1789 – March 4, 1791	
Robert M. Yardley	Republican	7th	March 4, 1887 – March 4, 1891	
Gus Yatron	Democratic	6th	January 3, 1969 – January 3, 1993	
Seth H. Yocum	Greenback	20th	March 4, 1825 – March 4, 1827	
Jacob S. Yost	Democratic	5th	March 4, 1843 – March 4, 1847	
James R. Young	Republican	4th	March 4, 1897 – March 4, 1903	
Edward D. Ziegler	Democratic	19th	March 4, 1899 – March 4, 1901	unsuccessful candidate for renomination

== See also ==
- List of United States senators from Pennsylvania
- Pennsylvania's congressional delegations
- Pennsylvania's congressional districts

== Sources ==
- House of Representatives List of Members
