= William Mutchler =

American politician

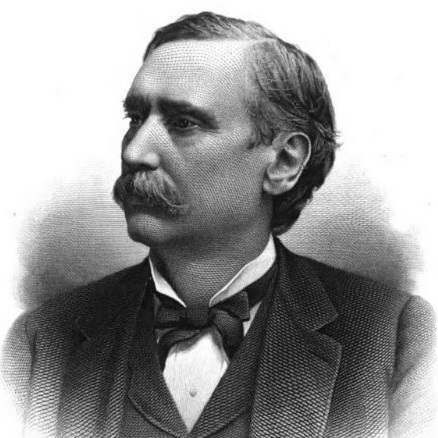

Member of the U.S. House of Representatives from Pennsylvania
- In office March 4, 1889 – June 23, 1893
- Preceded by: Daniel Ermentrout
- Succeeded by: Howard Mutchler
- Constituency: 8th district
- In office March 4, 1881 – March 3, 1885
- Preceded by: Reuben K. Bachman
- Succeeded by: William H. Sowden
- Constituency: 10th district
- In office March 6, 1875 – March 3, 1877
- Preceded by: John W. Killinger
- Succeeded by: Samuel A. Bridges
- Constituency: 10th district

Personal details
- Born: December 21, 1831 Palmer Township, Pennsylvania, U.S.
- Died: June 23, 1893 (aged 61) Easton, Pennsylvania
- Party: Democratic
- Children: 6, including Howard

William Mutchler (December 21, 1831 – June 23, 1893) was a Democratic member of the U.S. House of Representatives from Pennsylvania.

== Early life and education ==
Mutchlerwas born in Palmer Township, Pennsylvania. He attended public schools and Vandeveer’s Academy in Easton, Pennsylvania. He studied law, was admitted to the bar, and commenced practice in Easton, Pennsylvania. He was the father of Howard Mutchler.

== Career ==
He served as sheriff of Northampton County, Pennsylvania, from 1854 to 1860, and as prothonotary of Northampton County from 1861 to 1867. He was adjutant of the Thirty-eighth Pennsylvania Volunteers in 1863. He was appointed assessor of internal revenue in March 1867 and served until May 1869. He was chairman of the Democratic State committee of Pennsylvania in 1869 and 1870, and a delegate to the Democratic National Conventions from 1876 until his death.

Mutchler was elected as a Democrat to the Forty-fourth Congress, where he served as chairman of the United States House Committee on Expenditures in the Department of the Interior. He was not a candidate for reelection in 1876. He was again elected to the Forty-seventh and Forty-eighth Congresses. He was not a candidate for reelection in 1884. He was again elected to the Fifty-first, Fifty-second, and Fifty-third Congresses, and served until his death in Easton, Pennsylvania. He was interred in Easton Cemetery in Easton.

== See also ==
- List of members of the United States Congress who died in office (1790–1899)

U.S. House of Representatives
Preceded by John W. Killinger	Member of the U.S. House of Representatives from Pennsylvania's 10th congressional district 1875–1877	Succeeded by Samuel A. Bridges
Preceded by Reuben K. Bachman	Member of the U.S. House of Representatives from Pennsylvania's 10th congressional district 1881–1885	Succeeded by William H. Sowden
Preceded by Daniel Ermentrout	Member of the U.S. House of Representatives from Pennsylvania's 8th congressional district 1889–1893	Succeeded by Howard Mutchler
