= Michael Hutchinson Jenks =

American politician (1795–1867)

Michael H. Jenks
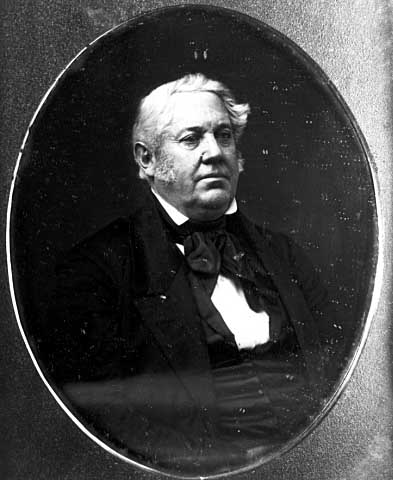

Member of the U.S. House of Representatives from Pennsylvania's 6th district
- In office March 4, 1843 – March 3, 1845
- Preceded by: Robert Ramsey
- Succeeded by: Jacob Erdman

Personal details
- Born: May 21, 1795 Bridgetown Mills, Pennsylvania
- Died: October 16, 1867 (aged 72) Newtown, Bucks County, Pennsylvania
- Party: Whig

Michael Hutchinson Jenks (May 21, 1795 – October 16, 1867) was a Whig member of the U.S. House of Representatives from Pennsylvania.

== Biography ==
Michael H. Jenks was born at Bridgetown Mills, Pennsylvania, near Middletown, Pennsylvania. He served as commissioner of Bucks County, Pennsylvania, from 1830 to 1833, and treasurer from 1833 to 1835. He moved to Newtown, Pennsylvania, in 1837, and served as associate judge of the court of common pleas of Bucks County from 1838 to 1843.

Jenks was elected as a Whig to the Twenty-eighth Congress. He was an unsuccessful candidate for reelection in 1844. He was engaged in the real estate business and as general business agent from 1845 to 1865, and served as chief burgess of Newtown from 1848 to 1853.

Jenks was married to Mary Ridgeway. His daughter, Anna Earl Jenks, was married to Alexander Ramsey, first territorial governor of Minnesota and second governor of the state of Minnesota. Ramsey served in the 28th congress with Jenks, and it was during a visit to Washington that Anna met her future husband.

He died in Newtown in 1867. Interment in the Newtown Friends Meetinghouse Cemetery.

== Sources ==
- The Political Graveyard

U.S. House of Representatives
Preceded by Robert Ramsey	Member of the U.S. House of Representatives from Pennsylvania's 6th congressional district 1843–1845	Succeeded by Jacob Erdman
