= Jacob Erdman =

American politician

Member of the U.S. House of Representatives from Pennsylvania's 6th district
- In office March 4, 1845 – March 3, 1847
- Preceded by: Michael Hutchinson Jenks
- Succeeded by: John Westbrook Hornbeck

Member of the Pennsylvania House of Representatives
- In office 1834-1836

Personal details
- Born: February 22, 1801 Coopersburg, Pennsylvania
- Died: July 20, 1867 (aged 66) Coopersburg, Pennsylvania
- Resting place: Blue Church Cemetery
- Party: Democratic

Jacob Erdman (February 22, 1801 – July 20, 1867) was an American politician who served one term as a Democratic member of the U.S. House of Representatives from Pennsylvania from 1845 to 1847.

== Early life ==
Jacob Erdman was born in Coopersburg, Pennsylvania.

== Political career ==
He was a member of the Pennsylvania House of Representatives from 1834 to 1836.

Erdman was elected as a Democrat to the Twenty-ninth Congress. He was an unsuccessful candidate for reelection in 1846.

== Later career and death ==
He was elected associate judge of Lehigh County Court on November 9, 1866 and served until his death in Coopersburg, Pennsylvania, He is interred in Blue Church Cemetery near Coopersburg.

== Sources ==
- United States Congress. "Jacob Erdman (id: E000200)". Biographical Directory of the United States Congress.

U.S. House of Representatives
Preceded by Michael H. Jenks	Member of the U.S. House of Representatives from Pennsylvania's 6th congressional district 1845–1847	Succeeded by Westbrook Hornbeck
