= Reuben K. Bachman =

American politician

Reuben Knecht Bachman
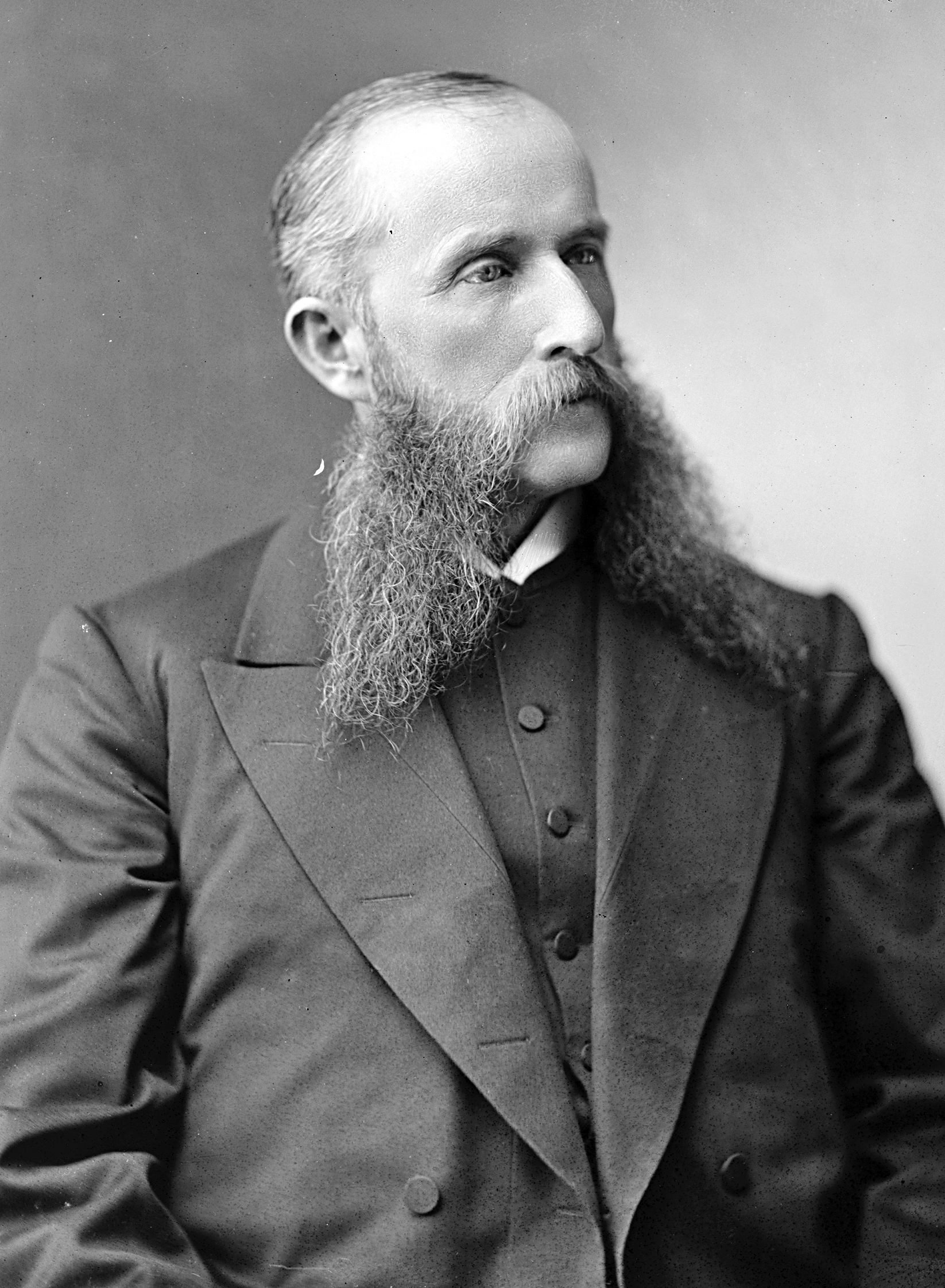

Member of the U.S. House of Representatives from Pennsylvania's 10th district
- In office March 4, 1879 – March 3, 1881
- Preceded by: Samuel A. Bridges
- Succeeded by: William Mutchler

Personal details
- Born: August 6, 1834 Williams Township, Pennsylvania
- Died: September 19, 1911 (aged 77)
- Party: Democratic

Reuben Knecht Bachman (August 6, 1834 – September 19, 1911) was a Democratic member of the U.S. House of Representatives from Pennsylvania.

Reuben K. Bachman was born in Williams Township, Northampton County, Pennsylvania. He attended the common schools, and taught school for several years. He entered the mercantile and milling business in Durham, Pennsylvania. He owned and operated the Durham Mill.

Bachman was elected as a Democrat to the Forty-sixth Congress. He was not a candidate for renomination in 1880. He was a delegate to the 1884 Democratic National Convention at Chicago. He engaged in the lumber business and the manufacture of builders' millwork at Riegelsville, Pennsylvania, and Phillipsburg, New Jersey. He died in Easton, Pennsylvania. Interment in Durham Cemetery, near Durham.

== Sources ==
- United States Congress. "Reuben K. Bachman (id: B000011)". Biographical Directory of the United States Congress.
- The Political Graveyard

U.S. House of Representatives
Preceded by Samuel A. Bridges	Member of the U.S. House of Representatives from Pennsylvania's 10th congressional district 1879–1881	Succeeded by William Mutchler
