= John Westbrook Hornbeck =

American politician (1804–1848)

John W. Hornbeck

Member of the U.S. House of Representatives from Pennsylvania's 6th district
- In office March 4, 1847 – January 16, 1848
- Preceded by: Jacob Erdman
- Succeeded by: Samuel Augustus Bridges

Personal details
- Born: January 24, 1804 Montague Township, New Jersey, U.S.
- Died: January 16, 1848 (aged 43) Allentown, Pennsylvania, U.S.
- Party: Whig
- Education: Union College

John Westbrook Hornbeck (January 24, 1804 – January 16, 1848) was a Whig member of the U.S. House of Representatives from Pennsylvania.

== Biography ==
Westbrook Hornbeck was born in Montague Township, New Jersey. He graduated from Union College in Schenectady, New York, in 1827. He studied law, was admitted to the bar of Northampton County, Pennsylvania, in 1829 and commenced practice in Allentown, Pennsylvania, in 1830. He was commissioned deputy attorney general of the State of Pennsylvania for Lehigh County, Pennsylvania, in 1836 and served three years.

Hornbeck was elected as a Whig to the Thirtieth Congress and served until his death in Allentown in 1848. He served as chairman of the United States House Committee on Revisal and Unfinished Business during the Thirtieth Congress. Interment in Allentown Cemetery.

== See also ==
- List of members of the United States Congress who died in office (1790–1899)

== Sources ==
- United States Congress. "John Westbrook Hornbeck (id: H000790)". Biographical Directory of the United States Congress.
- The Political Graveyard

U.S. House of Representatives
Preceded by Jacob Erdman	Member of the U.S. House of Representatives from Pennsylvania's 6th congressional district 1847–1848	Succeeded by Samuel A. Bridges
