= Samuel A. Bridges =

American politician (1802–1884)

Samuel Augustus Bridges
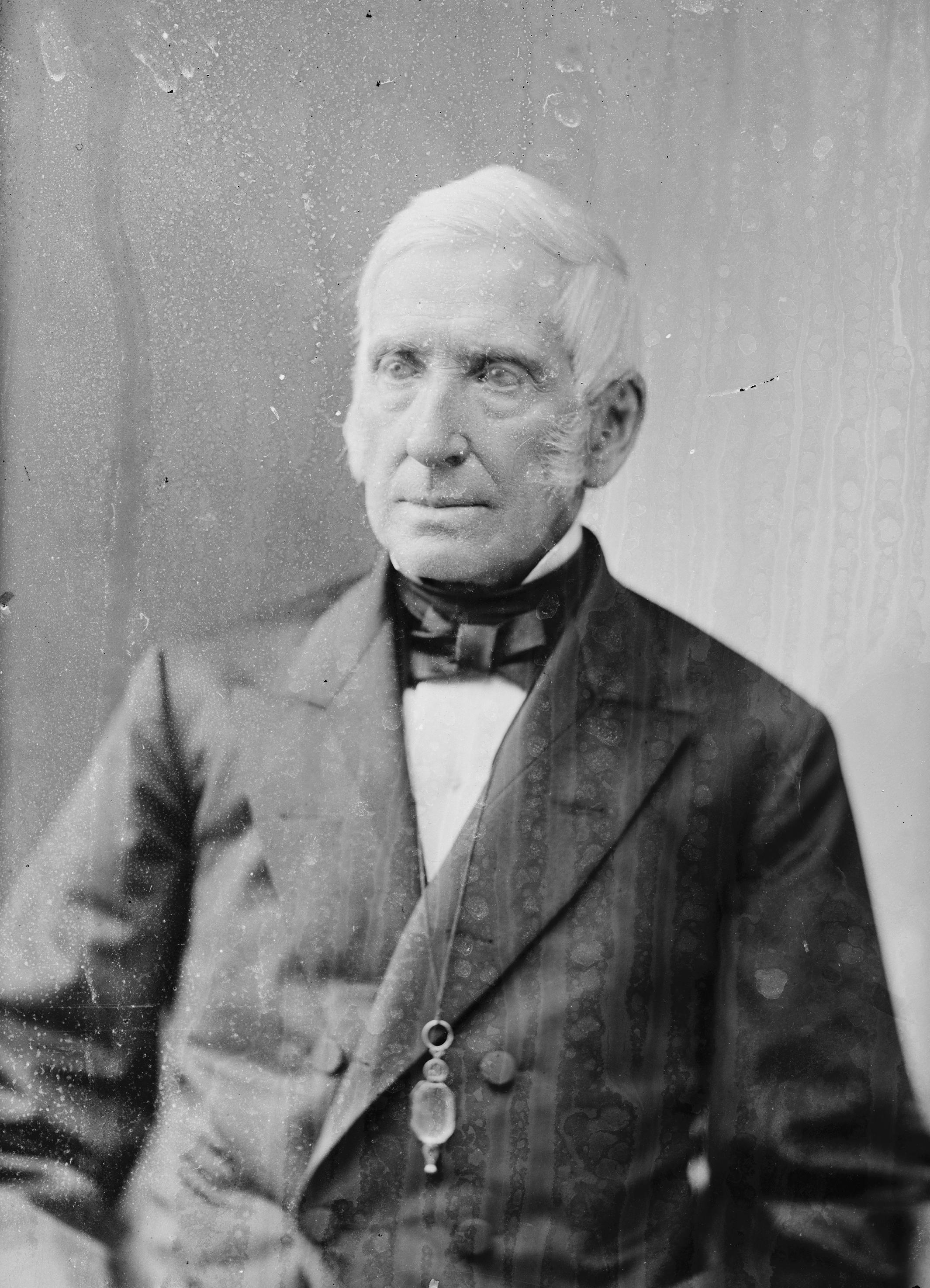

Member of the U.S. House of Representatives from Pennsylvania
- In office March 4, 1877 – March 3, 1879
- Preceded by: William Mutchler
- Succeeded by: Reuben Knecht Bachman
- Constituency: 10th district
- In office March 4, 1853 – March 3, 1855
- Preceded by: John Alexander Morrison
- Succeeded by: Samuel Carey Bradshaw
- Constituency: 7th district
- In office March 6, 1848 – March 3, 1849
- Preceded by: John Westbrook Hornbeck
- Succeeded by: Thomas Ross
- Constituency: 6th district

Personal details
- Born: January 27, 1802 Colchester, Connecticut, U.S.
- Died: January 14, 1884 (aged 81)
- Party: Democratic

Samuel Augustus Bridges (January 27, 1802 – January 14, 1884) was a Democratic member of the U.S. House of Representatives from Pennsylvania.

Samuel A. Bridges was born in Colchester, Connecticut. He pursued an academic course, and graduated from Williams College in Williamstown, Massachusetts, in 1826. He studied law, was admitted to the bar in 1829 and commenced practice in Doylestown, Pennsylvania. He moved to Allentown, Pennsylvania, in 1830, where he continued the practice of law. He served as town clerk from 1837 to 1842, and deputy attorney general of the State for Lehigh County, Pennsylvania, from 1837 to 1844. He was a delegate to the Democratic State convention in 1841.

Bridges was elected as a Democrat to the Thirtieth Congress to fill the vacancy caused by the death of John W. Hornbeck. He was not a candidate for renomination in 1848. He was again elected to the Thirty-third Congress, but was an unsuccessful candidate for reelection in 1854. He resumed the practice of law, and was again elected to the Forty-fifth Congress. He was not a candidate for renomination in 1878. He continued the practice of law in Allentown where he died in 1884. Interment in Union Cemetery.

== Sources ==
- United States Congress. "Samuel A. Bridges (id: B000824)". Biographical Directory of the United States Congress.
- The Political Graveyard

U.S. House of Representatives
Preceded by John W. Hornbeck	Member of the U.S. House of Representatives from Pennsylvania's 6th congressional district 1848–1849	Succeeded by Thomas Ross
Preceded by John A. Morrison	Member of the U.S. House of Representatives from Pennsylvania's 7th congressional district 1853–1855	Succeeded by Samuel C. Bradshaw
Preceded by William Mutchler	Member of the U.S. House of Representatives from Pennsylvania's 10th congressional district 1877–1879	Succeeded by Reuben K. Bachman
