= Thomas Ross (Pennsylvania politician) =

American politician (1806–1865)

Member of the U.S. House of Representatives from Pennsylvania's 6th district
- In office March 4, 1849 – March 3, 1853
- Preceded by: Samuel A. Bridges
- Succeeded by: William Everhart

Personal details
- Born: December 1, 1806 Easton, Pennsylvania, U.S.
- Died: July 7, 1865 (aged 58) Doylestown, Pennsylvania, U.S.
- Resting place: Doylestown Cemetery, Doylestown, Pennsylvania, U.S.
- Party: Democratic
- Other political affiliations: Anti-Masonic
- Spouse: Elizabeth Pawling
- Children: 4
- Parent(s): John Ross; Mary Jenkins
- Education: Princeton College
- Profession: Politician, lawyer

Thomas Ross (December 1, 1806 – July 7, 1865) was an American politician and lawyer who served in the United States House of Representatives from 1849 to 1853, representing the 6th congressional district of Pennsylvania as a Democrat in the 31st United States Congress and the 32nd United States Congress.

== Early life and education ==
Ross was born in Easton, Pennsylvania on December 1, 1806. His father, John Ross, served in the United States House of Representatives as a member of the Democratic-Republican Party, representing Pennsylvania's 2nd congressional district from 1809 to 1811 and Pennsylvania's 6th congressional district from 1815 to 1818.

Ross attended schools in Doylestown, Pennsylvania. He graduated from Princeton College in 1823 and studied law.

== Career ==
Ross was admitted to the bar in 1829; he commenced practice in Doylestown. He was appointed deputy attorney general of the state for Bucks County that same year.

Ross was frequently a candidate of the Democratic Party, though he was also affiliated with the Anti-Masonic Party.

=== Congress ===
Ross served in the United States House of Representatives from 1849 to 1853. He represented Pennsylvania's 6th congressional district—the same district his father represented—in the 31st United States Congress and the 32nd United States Congress.

Ross's time in office began on March 4, 1849 and concluded on March 3, 1853. Following his tenure in Congress, Ross resumed practicing law in Doylestown.

== Personal life and death ==
Ross was married to Elizabeth Pawling, with whom he had four children.

Ross died at the age of 58 in Doylestown, Pennsylvania on July 7, 1865. He was buried in Doylestown Cemetery.

U.S. House of Representatives
Preceded by Samuel A. Bridges	Member of the U.S. House of Representatives from Pennsylvania's 6th congressional district 1849–1853	Succeeded by William Everhart
