= List of United States representatives in the 37th Congress =

This is a complete list of United States representatives during the 37th United States Congress listed by seniority.

As an historical article, the districts and party affiliations listed reflect those during the 37th Congress (March 4, 1861 – March 3, 1863). Seats and party affiliations on similar lists for other congresses will be different for certain members.

Seniority depends on the date on which members were sworn into office. Since many members are sworn in on the same day, subsequent ranking is based on previous congressional service of the individual and then by alphabetical order by the last name of the representative.

Committee chairmanship in the House is often associated with seniority. However, party leadership is typically not associated with seniority.

Note: The "*" indicates that the representative/delegate may have served one or more non-consecutive terms while in the House of Representatives of the United States Congress.

== U.S. House seniority list ==
U.S. House seniority
Rank	Representative	Party	District	Seniority date (Previous service, if any)	No.# of term(s)	Notes
1	John S. Phelps	D	MO-06	March 4, 1845	9th term	Dean of the House; Left the House in 1863.
2	Galusha A. Grow	R	PA-14	March 4, 1851	6th term	Speaker of the House; Left the House in 1863.
3	Elihu B. Washburne	R	IL-01	March 4, 1853	5th term	
4	John Bingham	R	OH-21	March 4, 1855	4th term	Left the House in 1863.
5	James Buffington	R	MA-02	March 4, 1855	4th term	Left the House in 1863.
6	Henry C. Burnett	D	KY-01	March 4, 1855	4th term	Resigned on December 3, 1861.
7	Schuyler Colfax	R	IN-09	March 4, 1855	4th term	
8	John Covode	R	PA-19	March 4, 1855	4th term	Left the House in 1863.
9	John Hickman	R	PA-06	March 4, 1855	4th term	Left the House in 1863.
10	Justin S. Morrill	R	VT-02	March 4, 1855	4th term	
11	John Sherman	R	OH-13	March 4, 1855	4th term	Resigned on March 21, 1861.
12	Samuel S. Cox	D	OH-12	March 4, 1857	3rd term	
13	Samuel R. Curtis	R	IA-01	March 4, 1857	3rd term	Resigned on August 4, 1861.
14	Henry L. Dawes	R	MA-11	March 4, 1857	3rd term	
15	Reuben Fenton	R	NY-33	March 4, 1857; Previous service, 1853–1855.	4th term*	
16	William Kellogg	R	IL-04	March 4, 1857	3rd term	Left the House in 1863.
17	Owen Lovejoy	R	IL-03	March 4, 1857	3rd term	
18	Horace Maynard	U	TN-02	March 4, 1857	3rd term	Left the House in 1863.
19	Edward J. Morris	R	PA-02	March 4, 1857; Previous service, 1843–1845.	4th term*	Resigned on June 8, 1861.
20	Abram B. Olin	R	NY-13	March 4, 1857	3rd term	Left the House in 1863.
21	George H. Pendleton	D	OH-01	March 4, 1857	3rd term	
22	John F. Potter	R	WI-01	March 4, 1857	3rd term	Left the House in 1863.
23	Eliakim P. Walton	R	VT-01	March 4, 1857	3rd term	Left the House in 1863.
24	John B. Clark	D	MO-03	December 7, 1857	3rd term	Resigned on July 13, 1861.
25	Daniel W. Gooch	R	MA-07	January 31, 1858	3rd term	
26	Clement Vallandigham	D	OH-03	May 25, 1858	3rd term	Left the House in 1863.
27	Charles Francis Adams, Sr.	R	MA-03	March 4, 1859	2nd term	Resigned on May 1, 1861.
28	Cyrus Aldrich	R	MN	March 4, 1859	2nd term	Left the House in 1863.
29	William Allen	D	OH-04	March 4, 1859	2nd term	Left the House in 1863.
30	John B. Alley	R	MA-06	March 4, 1859	2nd term	
31	James M. Ashley	R	OH-05	March 4, 1859	2nd term	
32	Elijah Babbitt	R	PA-25	March 4, 1859	2nd term	Left the House in 1863.
33	Samuel S. Blair	R	PA-18	March 4, 1859	2nd term	Left the House in 1863.
34	Alfred A. Burnham	R	CT-03	March 4, 1859	2nd term	Left the House in 1863.
35	James H. Campbell	R	PA-11	March 4, 1859; Previous service, 1855–1857.	3rd term*	Left the House in 1863.
36	Roscoe Conkling	R	NY-20	March 4, 1859	2nd term	Left the House in 1863.
37	Thomas Corwin	R	OH-07	March 4, 1859; Previous service, 1831–1840.	7th term*	Resigned on March 12, 1861.
38	Charles Delano	R	MA-10	March 4, 1859	2nd term	Left the House in 1863.
39	R. Holland Duell	R	NY-21	March 4, 1859	2nd term	Left the House in 1863.
40	William M. Dunn	R	IN-03	March 4, 1859	2nd term	Left the House in 1863.
41	Sidney Edgerton	R	OH-18	March 4, 1859	2nd term	Left the House in 1863.
42	Thomas M. Edwards	R	NH-03	March 4, 1859	2nd term	Left the House in 1863.
43	Thomas D. Eliot	R	MA-01	March 4, 1859; Previous service, 1854–1855.	3rd term*	
44	Alfred Ely	R	NY-29	March 4, 1859	2nd term	Left the House in 1863.
45	Philip B. Fouke	D	IL-08	March 4, 1859	2nd term	Left the House in 1863.
46	Augustus Frank	R	NY-30	March 4, 1859	2nd term	
47	John A. Gurley	R	OH-02	March 4, 1859	2nd term	Left the House in 1863.
48	James T. Hale	R	PA-15	March 4, 1859	2nd term	
49	William S. Holman	D	IN-04	March 4, 1859	2nd term	
50	John Hutchins	R	OH-20	March 4, 1859	2nd term	Left the House in 1863.
51	Francis William Kellogg	R	MI-03	March 4, 1859	2nd term	
52	John W. Killinger	R	PA-10	March 4, 1859	2nd term	Left the House in 1863.
53	John A. Logan	D	IL-09	March 4, 1859	2nd term	Resigned on April 2, 1862.
54	Dwight Loomis	R	CT-01	March 4, 1859	2nd term	Left the House in 1863.
55	Robert Mallory	U	KY-07	March 4, 1859	2nd term	
56	Gilman Marston	R	NH-01	March 4, 1859	2nd term	Left the House in 1863.
57	James B. McKean	R	NY-15	March 4, 1859	2nd term	Left the House in 1863.
58	Robert McKnight	R	PA-22	March 4, 1859	2nd term	Left the House in 1863.
59	Edward McPherson	R	PA-17	March 4, 1859	2nd term	Left the House in 1863.
60	James K. Moorhead	R	PA-21	March 4, 1859	2nd term	
61	John T. Nixon	R	NJ-01	March 4, 1859	2nd term	Left the House in 1863.
62	John W. Noell	D	MO-07	March 4, 1859	2nd term	
63	Albert G. Porter	R	IN-06	March 4, 1859	2nd term	Left the House in 1863.
64	Alexander H. Rice	R	MA-04	March 4, 1859	2nd term	
65	James C. Robinson	D	IL-07	March 4, 1859	2nd term	
66	George W. Scranton	R	PA-12	March 4, 1859	2nd term	Died on March 24, 1861.
67	Charles B. Sedgwick	R	NY-24	March 4, 1859	2nd term	Left the House in 1863.
68	Elbridge G. Spaulding	R	NY-32	March 4, 1859; Previous service, 1849–1851.	3rd term*	Left the House in 1863.
69	Thaddeus Stevens	R	PA-09	March 4, 1859; Previous service, 1849–1853.	4th term*	
70	John L. N. Stratton	R	NJ-02	March 4, 1859	2nd term	Left the House in 1863.
71	Charles R. Train	R	MA-08	March 4, 1859	2nd term	Left the House in 1863.
72	Carey A. Trimble	R	OH-10	March 4, 1859	2nd term	Left the House in 1863.
73	William Vandever	R	IA-02	March 4, 1859	2nd term	Left the House in 1863.
74	Charles Van Wyck	R	NY-10	March 4, 1859	2nd term	Left the House in 1863.
75	John P. Verree	R	PA-03	March 4, 1859	2nd term	Left the House in 1863.
76	Edwin H. Webster	U	MD-02	March 4, 1859	2nd term	
77	William Windom	R	MN	March 4, 1859	2nd term	
78	Harrison G. O. Blake	R	OH-14	October 11, 1859	2nd term	Left the House in 1863.
79	John A. McClernand	D	IL-06	November 8, 1859; Previous service, 1843–1851.	6th term*	Resigned on October 28, 1861.
80	Martin F. Conway	R	KS	January 29, 1861	2nd term	Left the House in 1863.
81	Sydenham E. Ancona	D	PA-08	March 4, 1861	1st term	
82	William Appleton	CU	MA-05	March 4, 1861; Previous service, 1851–1855.	3rd term*	Resigned on September 27, 1861.
83	Isaac N. Arnold	R	IL-02	March 4, 1861	1st term	
84	Goldsmith Bailey	R	MA-09	March 4, 1861	1st term	Died on May 8, 1862.
85	Joseph Bailey	D	PA-16	March 4, 1861	1st term	
86	Stephen Baker	R	NY-12	March 4, 1861	1st term	Left the House in 1863.
87	Portus Baxter	R	VT-03	March 4, 1861	1st term	
88	Fernando C. Beaman	R	MI-02	March 4, 1861	1st term	
89	Francis Preston Blair Jr.	R	MO-01	March 4, 1861; Previous service, 1857–1859 and 1860.	3rd term**	
90	George W. Bridges	U	TN-03	March 4, 1861	1st term	Left the House in 1863.
91	William G. Brown, Sr.	U	VA-10	March 4, 1861; Previous service, 1845–1849.	3rd term*	Left the House in 1863.
92	George H. Browne	U	RI-02	March 4, 1861	1st term	Left the House in 1863.
93	Charles B. Calvert	U	MD-06	March 4, 1861	1st term	Left the House in 1863.
94	John S. Carlile	U	VA-11	March 4, 1861; Previous service, 1855–1857.	2nd term*	Resigned on July 9, 1861.
95	Jacob P. Chamberlain	R	NY-26	March 4, 1861	1st term	Left the House in 1863.
96	Ambrose W. Clark	R	NY-23	March 4, 1861	1st term	
97	Andrew J. Clements	U	TN-04	March 4, 1861	1st term	Left the House in 1863.
98	George T. Cobb	D	NJ-04	March 4, 1861	1st term	Left the House in 1863.
99	Frederick A. Conkling	R	NY-06	March 4, 1861	1st term	Left the House in 1863.
100	Erastus Corning	D	NY-14	March 4, 1861; Previous service, 1857–1859.	2nd term*	
101	Thomas B. Cooper	D	PA-07	March 4, 1861	1st term	Died on April 4, 1862.
102	James A. Cravens	D	IN-02	March 4, 1861	1st term	
103	John W. Crisfield	U	MD-01	March 4, 1861; Previous service, 1847–1849.	2nd term*	Left the House in 1863.
104	John J. Crittenden	U	KY-08	March 4, 1861	1st term	Left the House in 1863.
105	William P. Cutler	R	OH-16	March 4, 1861	1st term	Left the House in 1863.
106	William M. Davis	R	PA-05	March 4, 1861	1st term	Left the House in 1863.
107	Isaac C. Delaplaine	D	NY-08	March 4, 1861	1st term	Left the House in 1863.
108	Alexander S. Diven	R	NY-27	March 4, 1861	1st term	Left the House in 1863.
109	George W. Dunlap	U	KY-06	March 4, 1861	1st term	Left the House in 1863.
110	James E. English	D	CT-02	March 4, 1861	1st term	
111	Samuel C. Fessenden	R	ME-03	March 4, 1861	1st term	Left the House in 1863.
112	George P. Fisher	U	DE	March 4, 1861	1st term	Left the House in 1863.
113	Richard Franchot	R	NY-19	March 4, 1861	1st term	Left the House in 1863.
114	John N. Goodwin	R	ME-01	March 4, 1861	1st term	Left the House in 1863.
115	Bradley F. Granger	R	MI-01	March 4, 1861	1st term	Left the House in 1863.
116	Henry Grider	U	KY-03	March 4, 1861; Previous service, 1843–1847.	3rd term*	
117	Edward Haight	D	NY-09	March 4, 1861	1st term	Left the House in 1863.
118	Luther Hanchett	R	WI-02	March 4, 1861	1st term	Died on November 24, 1862.
119	Aaron Harding	U	KY-04	March 4, 1861	1st term	
120	Valentine B. Horton	R	OH-11	March 4, 1861; Previous service, 1855–1859.	3rd term*	Left the House in 1863.
121	James S. Jackson	U	KY-02	March 4, 1861	1st term	Resigned on December 13, 1861.
122	Philip Johnson	D	PA-13	March 4, 1861	1st term	
123	George W. Julian	R	IN-05	March 4, 1861; Previous service, 1849–1851.	2nd term*	
124	William D. Kelley	R	PA-04	March 4, 1861	1st term	
125	James Kerrigan	D	NY-04	March 4, 1861	1st term	Left the House in 1863.
126	William E. Lansing	R	NY-22	March 4, 1861	1st term	Left the House in 1863.
127	John Law	D	IN-01	March 4, 1861	1st term	
128	Jesse Lazear	D	PA-20	March 4, 1861	1st term	
129	Cornelius Leary	U	MD-03	March 4, 1861	1st term	Left the House in 1863.
130	William E. Lehman	D	PA-01	March 4, 1861	1st term	Left the House in 1863.
131	Henry May	U	MD-04	March 4, 1861; Previous service, 1853–1855.	2nd term*	Left the House in 1863.
132	John W. Menzies	U	KY-10	March 4, 1861	1st term	Left the House in 1863.
133	William Mitchell	R	IN-10	March 4, 1861	1st term	Left the House in 1863.
134	Anson Morrill	R	ME-04	March 4, 1861	1st term	Left the House in 1863.
135	James R. Morris	D	OH-17	March 4, 1861	1st term	
136	Warren P. Noble	D	OH-09	March 4, 1861	1st term	
137	Elijah H. Norton	D	MO-04	March 4, 1861	1st term	Left the House in 1863.
138	Robert H. Nugen	D	OH-15	March 4, 1861	1st term	Left the House in 1863.
139	Moses F. Odell	D	NY-02	March 4, 1861	1st term	
140	John Patton	R	PA-24	March 4, 1861	1st term	Left the House in 1863.
141	Nehemiah Perry	D	NJ-05	March 4, 1861	1st term	
142	Timothy Guy Phelps	R	CA	March 4, 1861	1st term	Left the House in 1863.
143	Frederick A. Pike	R	ME-06	March 4, 1861	1st term	
144	Theodore M. Pomeroy	R	NY-25	March 4, 1861	1st term	
145	John W. Reid	D	MO-05	March 4, 1861	1st term	Resigned on August 3, 1861.
146	John H. Rice	R	ME-05	March 4, 1861	1st term	
147	William A. Richardson	D	IL-05	March 4, 1861; Previous service, 1847–1856.	6th term*	Resigned on January 29, 1863.
148	Albert G. Riddle	R	OH-19	March 4, 1861	1st term	Left the House in 1863.
149	Edward H. Rollins	R	NH-02	March 4, 1861	1st term	
150	James S. Rollins	CU	MO-02	March 4, 1861	1st term	
151	Aaron A. Sargent	R	CA	March 4, 1861	1st term	Left the House in 1863.
152	John P. C. Shanks	R	IN-11	March 4, 1861	1st term	Left the House in 1863.
153	William P. Sheffield	U	RI-01	March 4, 1861	1st term	Left the House in 1863.
154	Samuel Shellabarger	R	OH-08	March 4, 1861	1st term	Left the House in 1863.
155	Socrates N. Sherman	R	NY-17	March 4, 1861	1st term	Left the House in 1863.
156	A. Scott Sloan	R	WI-03	March 4, 1861	1st term	Left the House in 1863.
157	Edward H. Smith	D	NY-01	March 4, 1861	1st term	Left the House in 1863.
158	John B. Steele	D	NY-11	March 4, 1861	1st term	
159	William G. Steele	D	NJ-03	March 4, 1861	1st term	
160	Andrew J. Thayer	D	OR	March 4, 1861	1st term	Resigned on July 30, 1861.
161	Francis Thomas	U	MD-05	March 4, 1861; Previous service, 1831–1841.	6th term*	
162	Rowland E. Trowbridge	R	MI-04	March 4, 1861	1st term	Left the House in 1863.
163	Burt Van Horn	R	NY-31	March 4, 1861	1st term	Left the House in 1863.
164	Robert B. Van Valkenburgh	R	NY-28	March 4, 1861	1st term	
165	Chauncey Vibbard	D	NY-18	March 4, 1861	1st term	Left the House in 1863.
166	Daniel W. Voorhees	D	IN-07	March 4, 1861	1st term	
167	William H. Wadsworth	U	KY-09	March 4, 1861	1st term	
168	John W. Wallace	R	PA-23	March 4, 1861	1st term	Left the House in 1863.
169	William Wall	D	NY-05	March 4, 1861	1st term	Left the House in 1863.
170	Charles W. Walton	R	ME-02	March 4, 1861	1st term	Resigned on May 26, 1862.
171	Elijah Ward	D	NY-07	March 4, 1861; Previous service, 1857–1859.	2nd term*	
172	Kellian Whaley	U	VA-12	March 4, 1861	1st term	Left the House in 1863.
173	William A. Wheeler	R	NY-16	March 4, 1861	1st term	Left the House in 1863.
174	Albert S. White	R	IN-08	March 4, 1861; Previous service, 1837–1839.	2nd term*	Left the House in 1863.
175	Chilton A. White	D	OH-06	March 4, 1861	1st term	
176	Charles A. Wickliffe	U	KY-05	March 4, 1861; Previous service, 1823–1833.	6th term*	Left the House in 1863.
177	Benjamin Wood	D	NY-03	March 4, 1861	1st term	
178	George C. Woodruff	D	CT-04	March 4, 1861	1st term	Left the House in 1863.
179	Charles H. Upton	U	VA-07	May 23, 1861	1st term	Resigned on February 27, 1862.
	Benjamin Thomas	U	MA-03	June 11, 1861	1st term	Left the House in 1863.
	Charles J. Biddle	D	PA-02	July 2, 1861	1st term	Left the House in 1863.
	Richard A. Harrison	U	OH-07	July 4, 1861	1st term	Left the House in 1863.
	Samuel T. Worcester	R	OH-13	July 4, 1861	1st term	Left the House in 1863.
	Hendrick B. Wright	D	PA-12	July 4, 1861; Previous service, 1853–1855.	2nd term*	Left the House in 1863.
	George K. Shiel	D	OR	July 30, 1861	1st term	Left the House in 1863.
	James F. Wilson	R	IA-01	October 8, 1861	1st term	
	Jacob B. Blair	U	VA-11	December 2, 1861	1st term	Left the House in 1863.
	Samuel Hooper	R	MA-05	December 2, 1861	1st term	
	Anthony L. Knapp	D	IL-06	December 12, 1861	1st term	
	William A. Hall	D	MO-03	January 20, 1862	1st term	
	Thomas L. Price	D	MO-05	January 21, 1862	1st term	Left the House in 1863.
	Samuel L. Casey	U	KY-01	March 10, 1862	1st term	Left the House in 1863.
	Joseph Segar	U	VA-01	March 16, 1862	1st term	Left the House in 1863.
	William J. Allen	D	IL-09	June 2, 1862	1st term	
	Frederick Low	R	CA	June 3, 1862	1st term	Left the House in 1863.
	John D. Stiles	D	PA-07	June 3, 1862	1st term	
	T. A. D. Fessenden	R	ME-02	December 1, 1862	1st term	Left the House in 1863.
	Amasa Walker	D	MA-09	December 1, 1862	1st term	Left the House in 1863.
	George H. Yeaman	U	KY-02	December 1, 1862	1st term	
	Michael Hahn	U	LA-02	December 3, 1862	1st term	Left the House in 1863.
	Benjamin Flanders	U	LA-01	December 3, 1862	1st term	Left the House in 1863.
	Walter D. McIndoe	R	WI-02	January 26, 1863	1st term	
	Lewis McKenzie	U	VA-07	February 16, 1863	1st term	Left the House in 1863.

== Delegates ==
Rank	Delegate	Party	District	Seniority date (Previous service, if any)	No.# of term(s)	Notes
1	Samuel Gordon Daily	R	NE	May 18, 1860	2nd term	
2	John Milton Bernhisel	Ind.	UT	March 4, 1861; Previous service, 1851–1859.	5th term*	
3	William H. Wallace	D	WA	March 4, 1861	1st term	
4	John Sebrie Watts	R	NM	March 4, 1861	1st term	
	Hiram Pitt Bennet	R	CO	August 19, 1861	1st term	
	John Cradlebaugh	Ind.	NV	December 2, 1861	1st term	
	John Blair Smith Todd	D	DAK	December 9, 1861	1st term	

== See also ==
- 37th United States Congress
- List of United States congressional districts
- List of United States senators in the 37th Congress
