= 1976 United States presidential election in Pennsylvania =

- November 2, 1976

Nominee	Jimmy Carter	Gerald Ford
Party	Democratic	Republican
Home state	Georgia	Michigan
Running mate	Walter Mondale	Bob Dole
Electoral vote	27	0
Popular vote	2,328,677	2,205,604
Percentage	50.40%	47.73%
County results
Carter
40–50%
50–60%
60–70%
Ford
40–50%
50–60%
60–70%
President before election
Gerald Ford
Republican
Elected President
Jimmy Carter
Democratic

The 1976 United States presidential election in Pennsylvania took place on November 2, 1976, and was part of the 1976 United States presidential election. Voters chose 27 representatives, or electors to the Electoral College, who voted for president and vice president.

Pennsylvania voted for the Democratic nominee, former Georgia Governor Jimmy Carter, over the Republican nominee, President Gerald Ford. Carter won Pennsylvania by a margin of 2.67%, which made Pennsylvania roughly 0.6% more Democratic than the nation at large.

While Ford won more counties by running up victories in the central region of the state and the Philadelphia suburbs, Carter swept Southwestern Pennsylvania where Pittsburgh is located, Erie County (Erie), Lackawanna County (Scranton), and Philadelphia.

As of the 2020 presidential election, this is the last presidential election where the Democratic candidate won Pennsylvania without carrying any of Philadelphia's suburban counties. This is also the final occasion of only four where Pennsylvania and Michigan voted for different presidential candidates ever since the Democrats and Republicans became the two major parties in U.S. politics. (Note: The other times were in 1856, 1932, and 1940.)

== Campaign ==
The first presidential debate for the general election was held in Philadelphia at the Walnut Street Theatre on September 23 with President Ford and Jimmy Carter attending the debate. The debate was moderated by Edwin Newman of NBC News and sponsored by the League of Women Voters with 69.7 million people watching

== Results ==
1976 United States presidential election in Pennsylvania
Party	Candidate	Votes	Percentage	Electoral votes
Democratic	Jimmy Carter	2,328,677	50.40%	27
Republican	Gerald Ford (incumbent)	2,205,604	47.73%	0
McCarthy '76	Eugene McCarthy	50,584	1.09%	0
Constitutional	Lester Maddox	25,344	0.55%	0
Socialist Workers	Peter Camejo	3,009 (Note: Although these candidates are included in the “other” total from Dave Leip’s Atlas, they are not separated by county in any available data set.)	0.07%	0
Write-ins	Write-ins	2,934	0.06%	0
Labor	Lyndon LaRouche	2,744	0.06%	0
Communist	Gus Hall	1,891	0.04%	0
Totals		4,620,787	100.00%	27

=== Results by county ===
County	Jimmy Carter Democratic		Gerald Ford Republican		Eugene McCarthy McCarthy ‘76		Lester Maddox Constitutional		Various candidates Other parties		Margin		Total votes cast
County	#	%	#	%	#	%	#	%	#	%	#	%	Total votes cast
Adams	8,771	41.14%	12,133	56.90%	276	1.29%	73	0.34%	69	0.32%	-3,362	-15.76%	21,322
Allegheny	328,343	50.68%	303,127	46.79%	8,625	1.33%	5,205	0.80%	2,557	0.39%	25,216	3.89%	647,857
Armstrong	15,179	52.25%	13,378	46.05%	290	1.00%	190	0.65%	13	0.04%	1,801	6.20%	29,050
Beaver	46,117	56.83%	33,593	41.40%	925	1.14%	291	0.36%	224	0.28%	12,524	15.43%	81,150
Bedford	6,652	41.22%	9,355	57.97%	78	0.48%	42	0.26%	11	0.07%	-2,703	-16.75%	16,138
Berks	50,994	47.41%	54,452	50.63%	1,176	1.09%	771	0.72%	160	0.15%	-3,458	-3.22%	107,553
Blair	18,397	38.84%	28,290	59.73%	395	0.83%	154	0.33%	130	0.27%	-9,893	-20.89%	47,366
Bradford	7,913	37.62%	12,851	61.10%	186	0.88%	71	0.34%	13	0.06%	-4,938	-23.48%	21,034
Bucks	79,838	47.26%	85,628	50.69%	2,125	1.26%	1,091	0.65%	241	0.14%	-5,790	-3.43%	168,923
Butler	22,611	45.04%	26,366	52.52%	666	1.33%	421	0.84%	134	0.27%	-3,755	-7.48%	50,198
Cambria	38,797	53.79%	32,469	45.02%	624	0.87%	133	0.18%	105	0.15%	6,328	8.77%	72,128
Cameron	1,319	44.31%	1,616	54.28%	25	0.84%	5	0.17%	12	0.40%	-297	-9.97%	2,977
Carbon	10,791	54.03%	8,883	44.48%	160	0.80%	108	0.54%	31	0.16%	1,908	9.55%	19,973
Centre	17,867	44.18%	21,177	52.37%	1,158	2.86%	137	0.34%	98	0.24%	-3,310	-8.19%	40,437
Chester	42,712	38.13%	67,686	60.42%	1,166	1.04%	317	0.28%	145	0.13%	-24,974	-22.29%	112,026
Clarion	6,585	43.29%	8,360	54.96%	177	1.16%	53	0.35%	35	0.23%	-1,775	-11.67%	15,210
Clearfield	13,714	49.54%	13,626	49.22%	190	0.69%	109	0.39%	46	0.17%	88	0.32%	27,685
Clinton	6,532	51.99%	5,858	46.63%	87	0.69%	69	0.55%	18	0.14%	674	5.36%	12,564
Columbia	12,051	50.37%	11,508	48.10%	196	0.82%	112	0.47%	58	0.24%	543	2.27%	23,925
Crawford	14,712	48.06%	15,301	49.99%	305	1.00%	232	0.76%	60	0.20%	-589	-1.93%	30,610
Cumberland	23,008	35.80%	39,950	62.16%	793	1.23%	460	0.72%	59	0.09%	-16,942	-26.36%	64,270
Dauphin	34,342	41.32%	46,819	56.33%	1,074	1.29%	785	0.94%	102	0.12%	-12,477	-15.01%	83,122
Delaware	117,252	43.28%	148,679	54.88%	2,995	1.11%	1,581	0.58%	387	0.14%	-31,427	-11.60%	270,894
Elk	6,713	51.21%	6,159	46.98%	178	1.36%	49	0.37%	10	0.08%	554	4.23%	13,109
Erie	55,385	51.55%	49,641	46.20%	1,303	1.21%	943	0.88%	167	0.16%	5,744	5.35%	107,439
Fayette	32,232	60.54%	20,021	37.60%	410	0.77%	523	0.98%	58	0.11%	12,211	22.94%	53,244
Forest	1,017	46.50%	1,135	51.90%	27	1.23%	5	0.23%	3	0.14%	-118	-5.40%	2,187
Franklin	14,643	41.38%	20,009	56.54%	311	0.88%	406	1.15%	20	0.06%	-5,366	-15.16%	35,389
Fulton	1,737	42.87%	2,219	54.76%	32	0.79%	36	0.89%	28	0.69%	-482	-11.89%	4,052
Greene	8,769	61.67%	5,293	37.22%	118	0.83%	30	0.21%	9	0.06%	3,476	24.45%	14,219
Huntingdon	5,410	40.19%	7,843	58.26%	129	0.96%	70	0.52%	10	0.07%	-2,433	-18.07%	13,462
Indiana	14,650	47.34%	15,786	51.01%	345	1.11%	74	0.24%	94	0.30%	-1,136	-3.67%	30,949
Jefferson	7,456	43.53%	9,437	55.09%	165	0.96%	56	0.33%	16	0.09%	-1,981	-11.56%	17,130
Juniata	3,105	43.09%	3,991	55.38%	55	0.76%	27	0.37%	28	0.39%	-886	-12.29%	7,206
Lackawanna	57,685	56.12%	43,354	42.17%	821	0.80%	861	0.84%	76	0.07%	14,331	13.95%	102,797
Lancaster	35,533	32.40%	72,106	65.74%	1,055	0.96%	642	0.59%	340	0.31%	-36,573	-33.34%	109,676
Lawrence	23,337	54.73%	18,546	43.49%	453	1.06%	172	0.40%	132	0.31%	4,791	11.24%	42,640
Lebanon	11,785	35.36%	20,880	62.65%	359	1.08%	237	0.71%	69	0.21%	-9,095	-27.29%	33,330
Lehigh	46,620	48.92%	46,895	49.20%	1,066	1.12%	581	0.61%	146	0.15%	-275	-0.28%	95,308
Luzerne	74,655	54.89%	60,058	44.16%	907	0.67%	251	0.18%	138	0.10%	14,597	10.73%	136,009
Lycoming	18,635	44.28%	22,648	53.82%	358	0.85%	351	0.83%	90	0.21%	-4,013	-9.54%	42,082
McKean	6,424	37.95%	10,305	60.88%	110	0.65%	72	0.43%	15	0.09%	-3,881	-22.93%	16,926
Mercer	25,041	51.91%	22,469	46.58%	413	0.86%	252	0.52%	60	0.12%	2,572	5.33%	48,235
Mifflin	6,210	44.01%	7,698	54.56%	102	0.72%	75	0.53%	24	0.17%	-1,488	-10.55%	14,109
Monroe	9,544	47.33%	10,228	50.72%	221	1.10%	141	0.70%	31	0.15%	-684	-3.39%	20,165
Montgomery	112,644	41.24%	155,480	56.92%	3,358	1.23%	1,233	0.45%	454	0.17%	-42,836	-15.68%	273,169
Montour	2,727	44.89%	3,259	53.65%	59	0.97%	26	0.43%	4	0.07%	-532	-8.76%	6,075
Northampton	42,514	55.24%	32,926	42.78%	751	0.98%	669	0.87%	101	0.13%	9,588	12.46%	76,961
Northumberland	18,939	48.72%	19,283	49.60%	306	0.79%	297	0.76%	51	0.13%	-344	-0.88%	38,876
Perry	4,605	37.38%	7,454	60.50%	156	1.27%	90	0.73%	15	0.12%	-2,849	-23.12%	12,320
Philadelphia	494,579	66.28%	239,000	32.03%	7,864	1.05%	2,178	0.29%	2,576	0.35%	255,579	34.25%	746,197
Pike	2,775	38.83%	4,241	59.35%	74	1.04%	48	0.67%	8	0.11%	-1,466	-20.52%	7,146
Potter	2,983	43.29%	3,828	55.55%	61	0.89%	11	0.16%	8	0.12%	-845	-12.26%	6,891
Schuylkill	33,905	50.64%	31,944	47.71%	678	1.01%	319	0.48%	102	0.15%	1,961	2.93%	66,948
Snyder	3,097	31.19%	6,557	66.04%	134	1.35%	67	0.67%	74	0.75%	-3,460	-34.85%	9,929
Somerset	13,452	45.32%	15,960	53.76%	180	0.61%	68	0.23%	25	0.08%	-2,508	-8.44%	29,685
Sullivan	1,347	45.65%	1,584	53.68%	18	0.61%	2	0.07%	0	0.00%	-237	-8.03%	2,951
Susquehanna	6,075	41.38%	8,331	56.74%	116	0.79%	127	0.87%	33	0.22%	-2,256	-15.36%	14,682
Tioga	5,795	40.23%	8,417	58.43%	142	0.99%	30	0.21%	21	0.15%	-2,622	-18.20%	14,405
Union	3,405	34.39%	6,309	63.71%	136	1.37%	41	0.41%	11	0.11%	-2,904	-29.32%	9,902
Venango	8,653	40.60%	12,270	57.58%	238	1.12%	76	0.36%	74	0.35%	-3,617	-16.98%	21,311
Warren	7,412	45.84%	8,508	52.62%	157	0.97%	82	0.51%	11	0.07%	-1,096	-6.78%	16,170
Washington	49,317	59.24%	32,827	39.43%	780	0.94%	235	0.28%	92	0.11%	16,490	19.81%	83,251
Wayne	4,244	34.48%	7,811	63.45%	121	0.98%	120	0.97%	14	0.11%	-3,567	-28.97%	12,310
Westmoreland	74,217	54.52%	59,172	43.47%	1,661	1.22%	743	0.55%	341	0.25%	15,045	11.05%	136,134
Wyoming	3,628	38.37%	5,705	60.34%	83	0.88%	34	0.36%	5	0.05%	-2,077	-21.97%	9,455
York	41,281	41.30%	56,912	56.94%	881	0.86%	665	0.65%	205	0.20%	-15,631	-15.64%	99,944
Totals	2,328,677	50.40%	2,205,604	47.73%	50,584	1.09%	25,344	0.55%	10,578	0.23%	123,073	2.67%	4,620,787

==== Counties that flipped from Republican to Democratic ====
- Allegheny
- Armstrong
- Beaver
- Cambria
- Carbon
- Clearfield
- Clinton
- Columbia
- Elk
- Erie
- Fayette
- Greene
- Lackawanna
- Lawrence
- Luzerne
- Mercer
- Northampton
- Schuylkill
- Washington
- Westmoreland

=== By congressional district ===
Carter won 14 of 25 congressional districts, including 2 which elected Republicans, while Ford won the remaining 11 districts, including 4 which elected Democrats.

District	Carter	Ford	Representative
1st	70.7%	29.3%	William A. Barrett
1st	70.7%	29.3%	Ozzie Myers
2nd	80.5%	19.5%	Robert N.C. Nix Sr.
3rd	68.2%	31.8%	William J. Green III
3rd	68.2%	31.8%	Raymond Lederer
4th	57.2%	42.8%	Joshua Eilberg
5th	38.9%	61.1%	Dick Schulze
6th	50.3%	49.7%	Gus Yatron
7th	46%	54%	Bob Edgar
8th	46.9%	53.1%	Ed Biester
8th	46.9%	53.1%	Peter Kostmayer
9th	40.7%	59.3%	Bud Shuster
10th	49.2%	50.8%	Joseph M. McDade
11th	54.4%	45.6%	Dan Flood
12th	50.8%	49.2%	John Murtha
13th	42.7%	57.3%	Lawrence Coughlin
14th	59.2%	40.8%	William S. Moorhead
15th	52.8%	47.2%	Fred B. Rooney
16th	35.9%	64.1%	Edwin D. Eshleman
16th	35.9%	64.1%	Bob Walker
17th	42.5%	57.5%	Herman T. Schneebeli
17th	42.5%	57.5%	Allen E. Ertel
18th	45.5%	54.5%	John Heinz
18th	45.5%	54.5%	Doug Walgren
19th	40%	60%	Bill Goodling
20th	55.1%	44.9%	Joseph M. Gaydos
21st	53.9%	46.1%	John H. Dent
22nd	57.8%	42.2%	Thomas E. Morgan
22nd	57.8%	42.2%	Austin Murphy
23rd	45.9%	54.1%	Albert W. Johnson
23rd	45.9%	54.1%	Joseph S. Ammerman
24th	52.1%	47.9%	Joseph P. Vigorito
24th	52.1%	47.9%	Marc L. Marks
25th	53.7%	46.9%	Gary A. Myers

== See also ==
- United States presidential elections in Pennsylvania
