= Michael Trout =

Michael or Mike Trout may refer to:

- Michael Carver Trout (1810–1873), U.S. Representative from Pennsylvania
- Michael Trout (Australian politician) (born 1963), member of the Legislative Assembly of Queensland
- Mike Trout (born 1991), American Major League Baseball player
