= Chapin Hall =

American politician

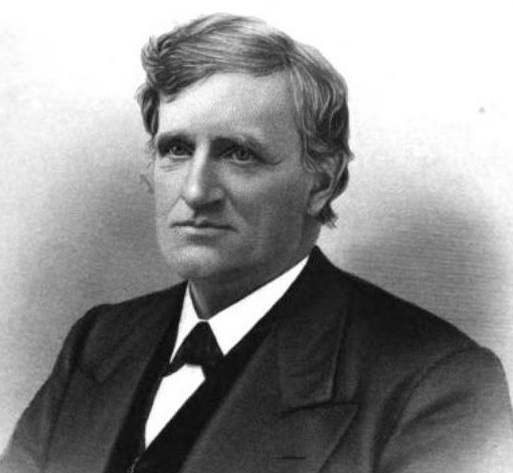
- From 1887's History of Warren County, Pennsylvania

Member of the U.S. House of Representatives from Pennsylvania's 24th district
- In office March 4, 1859 – March 3, 1861
- Preceded by: James Lisle Gillis
- Succeeded by: John Patton

Personal details
- Born: July 12, 1816 Busti, New York, U.S.
- Died: September 12, 1879 (aged 63) Jamestown, New York, U.S.
- Party: Republican

Chapin Hall (July 12, 1816 – September 12, 1879) was a Republican United States Representative from Pennsylvania. He served as Representative from 1859 until 1861.

== Biography ==
Chapin Hall was born in Busti, New York. He attended the common schools and the Jamestown Academy in Jamestown, New York. He moved to Pine Grove (now Russell), Warren County, Pennsylvania, about 1841 and engaged in the lumber business and mercantile pursuits. He moved to Warren, Pennsylvania, in 1851 and engaged in banking.

Hall was elected as a Republican to the Thirty-sixth Congress. He was not a candidate for renomination in 1860. He was interested in the manufacture of lumber products at Louisville, Kentucky, Fond du Lac, Wisconsin, and Newark, New Jersey, and in the manufacture of worsted goods at Jamestown, New York. He died in Jamestown in 1879. Interment in Jamestown's Lake View Cemetery.

U.S. House of Representatives
Preceded by James L. Gillis	Member of the U.S. House of Representatives from Pennsylvania's 24th congressional district 1859–1861	Succeeded by John Patton
