= James D. Weaver =

American politician

James Dorman Weaver
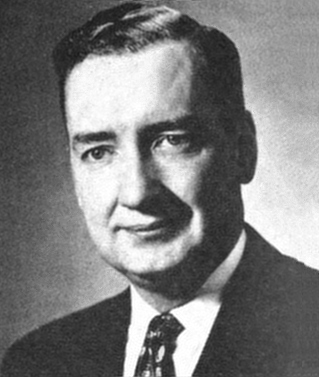

Member of the U.S. House of Representatives from Pennsylvania's 24th district
- In office January 3, 1963 – January 3, 1965
- Preceded by: Carroll D. Kearns
- Succeeded by: Joseph P. Vigorito

Personal details
- Born: September 27, 1920 Erie, Pennsylvania, U.S.
- Died: November 15, 2003 (aged 83) Sterling, Virginia, U.S.
- Party: Republican
- Spouse: Harriet M. Zesinger
- Education: Syracuse University; University of Pennsylvania
- Profession: Physician

Military service
- Allegiance: United States
- Branch/service: U.S. Army Medical Corps; United States Air Force
- Years of service: 1946–1948; 1965–1983
- Rank: Brigadier general †
- Commands: 382nd Station Hospital
- † Promoted posthumously

James Dorman Weaver (September 27, 1920 – November 15, 2003) was a Republican member of the U.S. House of Representatives from Pennsylvania, and a colonel in the United States Air Force before being posthumously promoted to brigadier general.

Weaver was born in Erie, Pennsylvania to Clara B. (née Sharp) and Dorman Weaver, both Canadian immigrants. He attended the Erie Conservatory of Music and Syracuse University in Syracuse, New York from 1938 to 1941. He graduated from the Medical School of the University of Pennsylvania in Philadelphia in 1944. While a student he worked on farms in Erie County, Pennsylvania and as an orchestral trombonist. He entered the United States Army Medical Corps in 1946 and served as captain, commanding officer and chief of surgery of the Three Hundred and Eighty-second Station Hospital in Ascom City, Korea, from 1947 to 1948.

After his military service, Weaver practiced medicine in Erie from 1948 to 1962. Weaver was a Pennsylvania delegate to White House Conference on Aging in 1961 and served as medical administrator for the Pennsylvania Bureau of Vocational Rehabilitation from 1960 to 1962. Weaver served as a medical consultant to the Warren Commission. He was elected as a Republican to the 88th Congress, but was an unsuccessful candidate for reelection in 1964. He returned to active duty with the United States Air Force from 1965 to 1983. He died in Sterling, Virginia, and is buried in Arlington National Cemetery.

Weaver was posthumously promoted to brigadier general on July 12, 2008.

Weaver's sister Jean was married to Major General Ronald C. Brock from 1963 until her death in 1966.

== Sources ==
- United States Congress. "James D. Weaver (id: W000226)". Biographical Directory of the United States Congress.

U.S. House of Representatives
Preceded by Carroll D. Kearns	Member of the U.S. House of Representatives from Pennsylvania's 24th congressional district 1963–1965	Succeeded by Joseph P. Vigorito
