= John Allison (Pennsylvania politician) =

American politician (1812–1878)

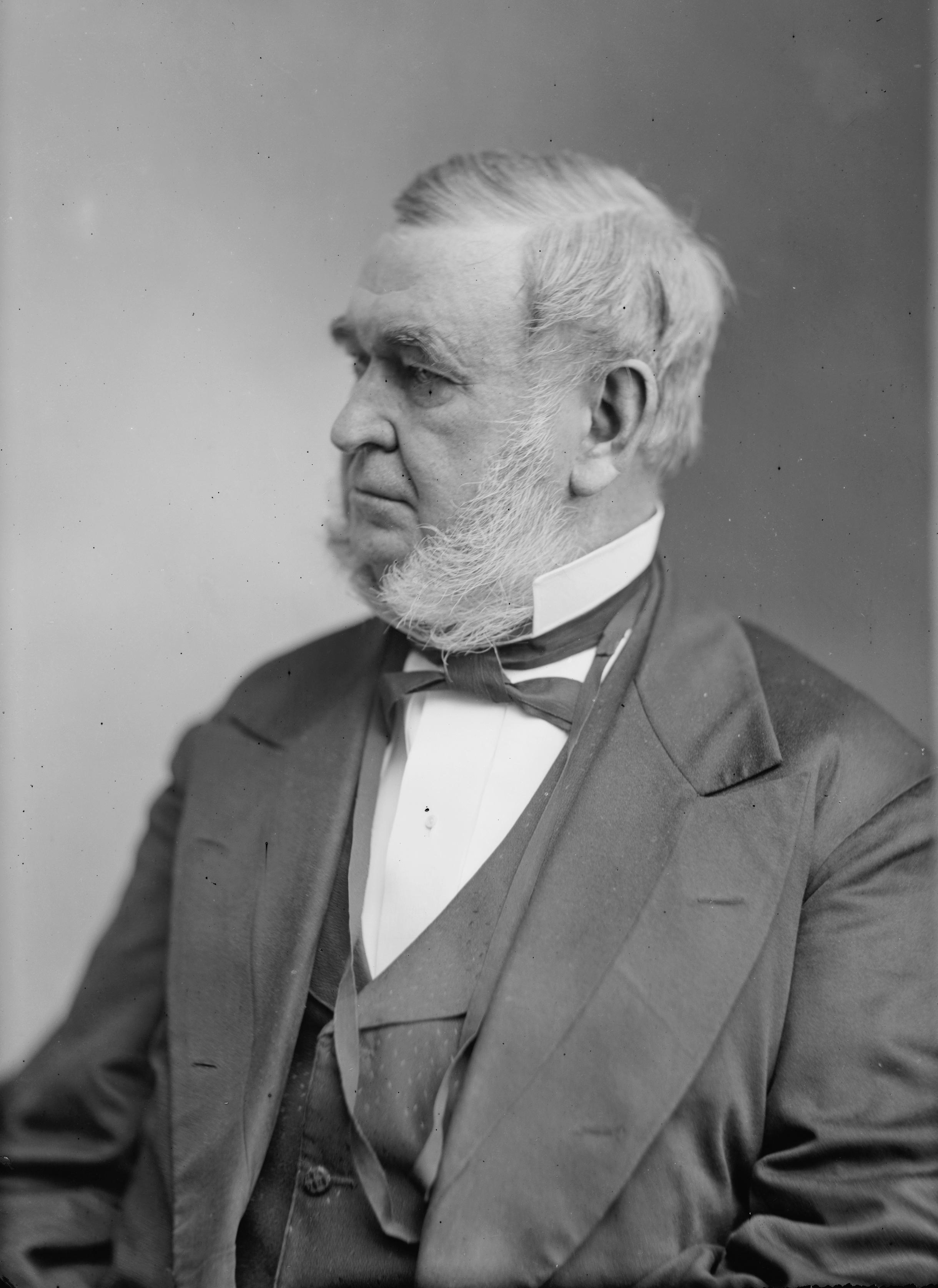
- Allison, 1865–1878

4th Register of the Treasury
- In office April 3, 1869 – March 23, 1878
- President: Ulysses S. Grant; Rutherford B. Hayes
- Preceded by: Noah L. Jeffries
- Succeeded by: Glenni W. Scofield

Member of the U.S. House of Representatives from Pennsylvania
- In office March 4, 1855 – March 3, 1857
- Preceded by: Michael C. Trout
- Succeeded by: William Stewart
- Constituency: 23rd district
- In office March 4, 1851 – March 3, 1853
- Preceded by: Robert R. Reed
- Succeeded by: John L. Dawson
- Constituency: 20th district

Member of the Pennsylvania House of Representatives
- In office 1846-1850

Personal details
- Born: August 5, 1812 Beaver, Pennsylvania
- Died: March 23, 1878 (aged 65) Washington, D.C.
- Party: Whig, Republican

John Allison (August 5, 1812 – March 23, 1878) was an American politician, most notably serving in the U.S. House as a Representative of Pennsylvania during the 1850s.

Allison was born in Beaver, Pennsylvania and grew up to study law. He was the son of James Allison, Jr. He was admitted to the bar, but did not practice, instead establishing a hat factory. He served in the Pennsylvania House of Representatives in 1846, 1847, and 1849; he ran successfully for the U.S. House as a Whig in the 1850 election. He lost his bid for re-election in 1852, but won back the seat in 1854 as a Whig. He then retired from the House in 1856.

After retiring from the House, he was active in the politics of the nascent Republican Party; he served as a delegate to their 1856 convention, where he nominated Abraham Lincoln for Vice President.

On April 3, 1869, Allison was appointed Register of the U.S. Treasury, a post he held until his death. He was interred in Beaver Cemetery.

U.S. House of Representatives
Preceded by Robert R. Reed	Member of the U.S. House of Representatives from Pennsylvania's 20th congressional district 1851–1853	Succeeded by John L. Dawson
Preceded by Michael C. Trout	Member of the U.S. House of Representatives from Pennsylvania's 23rd congressional district 1855–1857	Succeeded by William Stewart
