= Joseph Buffington (politician) =

American politician

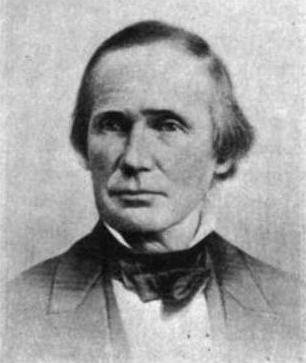
- From Volume three (1903) of Pennsylvania, Colonial and Federal: A History, 1608-1903

Member of the U.S. House of Representatives from Pennsylvania's 24th district
- In office March 4, 1843 – March 3, 1847
- Preceded by: Thomas Henry
- Succeeded by: Alexander Irvin

Personal details
- Born: November 27, 1803 West Chester, Pennsylvania
- Died: February 3, 1872 (aged 68)
- Party: Whig
- Education: University of Pittsburgh

Joseph Buffington (November 27, 1803 – February 3, 1872) was a Whig member of the U.S. House of Representatives from Pennsylvania.

Joseph Buffington was born in West Chester, Pennsylvania. He attended the common schools and graduated from Western University of Pennsylvania, now known as the University of Pittsburgh, in 1825. He moved to Butler County, Pennsylvania, and edited a weekly newspaper. He studied law, was admitted to the bar in 1826 and commenced practice in Butler. He moved to Kittanning, Pennsylvania, in 1827 and continued the practice of law.

Buffington was elected as a Whig to the Twenty-eighth and Twenty-ninth Congresses. He was not a candidate for renomination in 1846. He was appointed president judge of the eighteenth district in 1849 and served until 1851. He declined the appointment as chief justice of the Utah Territory tendered by President Millard Fillmore in 1852. He was judge of the tenth district of Pennsylvania from 1855 until his retirement in 1871. He died in Kittanning in 1872. Interment in Kittanning Cemetery.

== Sources ==
- United States Congress. "Joseph Buffington (id: B001041)". Biographical Directory of the United States Congress.
- The Political Graveyard

U.S. House of Representatives
Preceded by Thomas Henry	Member of the U.S. House of Representatives from Pennsylvania's 24th congressional district 1843–1847	Succeeded by Alexander Irvin
