= William Stewart (Pennsylvania politician) =

American politician

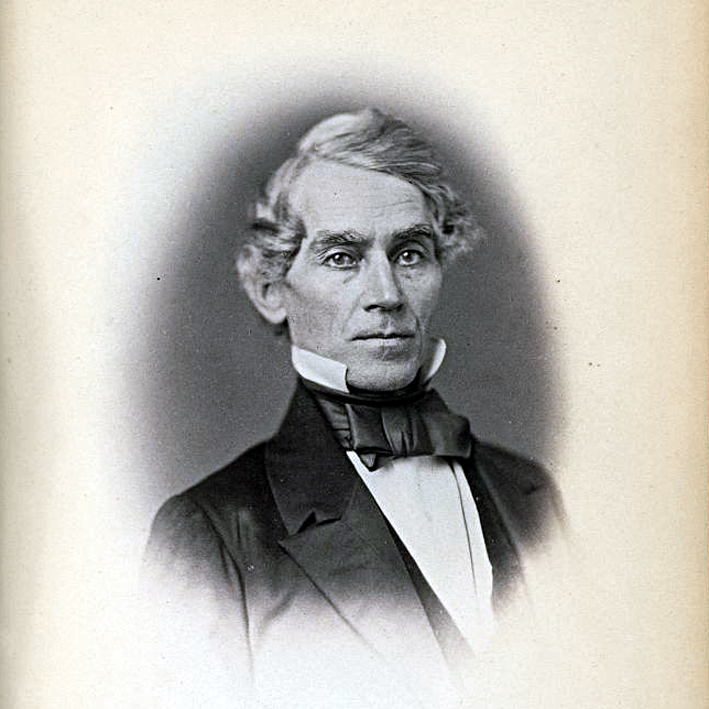
Circa 1859.

William Stewart (September 10, 1810 – October 17, 1876) was an American lawyer and Republican member of the U.S. House of Representatives from Pennsylvania.

== Formative years ==
Born in Mercer, Pennsylvania on September 10, 1810, William Stewart attended the public schools of his community before graduating from Jefferson College in Canonsburg, Pennsylvania.

== Career ==
Stewart went on to study law, was admitted to the bar and began his legal practice in Mercer.

A member of the Pennsylvania State Senate, he was subsequently elected as a Republican to the Thirty-fifth and Thirty-sixth Congresses, and was appointed as chair of the United States House Committee on Expenditures in the Department of War during the Thirty-sixth Congress.

Following his retirement from Congress, he resumed the practice of law.

== Death and interment ==
Stewart died in Mercer in 1876 at the age of sixty-six, and was interred in the Mercer Cemetery.

== Sources ==
- United States Congress. "William Stewart (id: S000921)". Biographical Directory of the United States Congress.
- The Political Graveyard

U.S. House of Representatives
Preceded by John Allison	Member of the U.S. House of Representatives from Pennsylvania's 23rd congressional district 1857–1861	Succeeded by John W. Wallace
