= Alfred Gilmore =

American politician

Member of the U.S. House of Representatives from Pennsylvania's 24th district
- In office March 4, 1849 – March 3, 1853
- Preceded by: Alexander Irvin
- Succeeded by: Carlton B. Curtis

Personal details
- Born: June 9, 1812 Butler, Pennsylvania
- Died: June 29, 1890 (aged 78) New York City, New York
- Party: Democratic
- Education: Washington College

Alfred Gilmore (June 9, 1812 – June 29, 1890) was a Democratic member of the U.S. House of Representatives from Pennsylvania.

== Biography ==
Alfred Gilmore (son of John Gilmore) was born in Butler, Pennsylvania. He graduated from Washington College in Washington, Pennsylvania, in 1833. He studied law, was admitted to the bar in 1836 and commenced practice in Butler.

Gilmore was elected as a Democrat to the Thirty-first and Thirty-second Congresses. He was not a candidate for reelection in 1852. He resumed the practice of law in Philadelphia, and later moved to Lenox, Massachusetts, in 1866, and continued the practice of his profession. He died while on a visit in New York City in 1890. Interment in Lenox Cemetery in Lenox, Massachusetts.

== Sources ==
- United States Congress. "Alfred Gilmore (id: G000220)". Biographical Directory of the United States Congress.
- The Political Graveyard

U.S. House of Representatives
Preceded by Alexander Irvin	Member of the U.S. House of Representatives from Pennsylvania's 24th congressional district 1849–1853	Succeeded by Carlton B. Curtis
