= Carroll D. Kearns =

American politician (1900–1976)

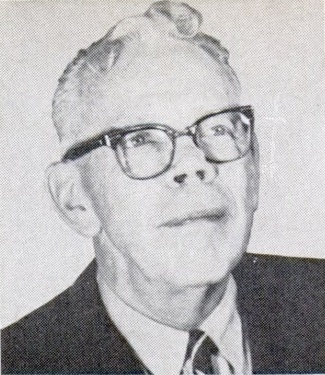
- Kearns, c. 1961

Member of the U.S. House of Representatives from Pennsylvania
- In office January 3, 1947 – January 3, 1963
- Preceded by: Thomas E. Morgan
- Succeeded by: James D. Weaver
- Constituency: 28th district (1947–1953); 24th district (1953–1963)

Personal details
- Born: May 7, 1900 Youngstown, Ohio, U.S.
- Died: June 11, 1976 (aged 76) Meadville, Pennsylvania, U.S.
- Party: Republican
- Spouse: Nora Mary Lynch (m. 1933)
- Children: 0
- Parents: Patrick Henry Kearns (father); Ida May Carroll (mother)
- Education: Westminster College; University of Pittsburgh; Pennsylvania State University
- Occupation: Concert artist; conductor; school administrator; politician

Carroll Dudley Kearns (May 7, 1900 – June 11, 1976) was a Republican member of the U.S. House of Representatives from Pennsylvania.

== Biography ==
Kearns was born in Youngstown, Ohio, the son of Patrick Henry and Ida May (née Carroll) Kearns. He moved with his parents to New Castle, PA, in 1901. He was a student in the Army Reserve Officers' Training Corps at the University of Pittsburgh in 1918, at the Chicago Musical College in Chicago, receiving a B.M. in 1921 and D.M. in 1948. He also received a B.S. from Westminster College in New Wilmington, PA, in 1933, and an M.E. from the University of Pittsburgh, in 1938. He took special studies at Penn State College at State College, PA in 1932 and 1933. He was engaged in the construction business in Chicago from 1925 through 1929. He taught school and engaged in educational work in supervisory and administrative positions in Illinois and Pennsylvania from 1924 through 1947, and also pursued a musical career as a concert artist and conductor.

He married Nora Mary Lynch in New Castle on August 30, 1933.

He was elected as a Republican to the Eightieth Congress, defeating a four-term incumbent in the primary, and to the seven succeeding Congresses. He served as the ranking minority member on the United States House Committee on Education and Labor during the 86th and 87th Congresses. He was an unsuccessful candidate for renomination in 1962. Kearns had never taken less than 71% in the primary since his initial nomination, but he got into a fight with the dominant Erie newspapers in his Erie-centered district and lost by 1023 votes.

Kearns voted in favor of the Civil Rights Acts of 1957 and 1960, but voted present on the 24th Amendment to the U.S. Constitution.

Kearns was active on educational, Labor, and cultural, issues. He was a supporter of federal aid to education. Time observed that the “onetime Chicago Symphony soloist (baritone) fights a lonely battle for his muse on lawyer-dominated Capitol Hill.” His wife also fought a cultural battle, being hired by the Post Office Department to campaign against obscene materials. The Representative had objected years before that military post exchanges were selling pornography. His one resolution that was enacted concerned pornography.

After his time in Congress, he became engaged in manufacturing from 1963 to 1970. On June 11, 1976, Carroll died at Meadville City Hospital in Pennsylvania.

== Sources ==
- United States Congress. "Carroll D. Kearns (id: K000032)". Biographical Directory of the United States Congress.

U.S. House of Representatives
Preceded by Robert L. Rodgers	Member of the U.S. House of Representatives from Pennsylvania's 28th congressional district 1947–1953	Succeeded by Herman P. Eberharter
Preceded by Thomas E. Morgan	Member of the U.S. House of Representatives from Pennsylvania's 24th congressional district 1953–1963	Succeeded by James D. Weaver
