= Thomas Henry (Pennsylvania politician) =

American politician

Member of the U.S. House of Representatives from Pennsylvania's 24th district
- In office March 4, 1837 – March 3, 1843
- Preceded by: John James Pearson
- Succeeded by: Joseph Buffington

Member of the Pennsylvania House of Representatives
- In office 1815

Personal details
- Born: 1779 County Down, Kingdom of Ireland
- Died: July 20, 1849 (aged 69–70) Beaver, Pennsylvania, U.S.
- Party: Anti-Masonic; Whig

Thomas Henry (1779 – July 20, 1849) was an Anti-Masonic and Whig member of the U.S. House of Representatives from Pennsylvania.

== Biography ==
Henry was born in County Down in the Kingdom of Ireland. He emigrated to the United States of America and settled in Beaver, Pennsylvania, in 1798. He was appointed justice of the peace by Governor Simon Snyder on December 24, 1808. He was elected county commissioner in 1810. He served as captain of a company that went from Beaver to help defend the northern frontier from a threatened British invasion in 1814. He was elected a member of the Pennsylvania House of Representatives in 1815. He served as prothonotary and clerk of courts from 1816 to 1821, and was elected sheriff of the county in 1821. He was proprietor and editor of the Western Argus from 1821 to 1831. He served as county treasurer in 1828 and 1829.

Henry was elected as an Anti-Masonic candidate to the Twenty-fifth and Twenty-sixth Congresses and reelected as a Whig to the Twenty-seventh Congress. He died in Beaver in 1849. Interment in Old Beaver Cemetery.

U.S. House of Representatives
Preceded by John James Pearson	Member of the U.S. House of Representatives from Pennsylvania's 24th congressional district 1837–1843	Succeeded by Joseph Buffington
