= List of United States senators in the 37th Congress =

This is a complete list of United States senators during the 37th United States Congress listed by seniority from March 4, 1861, to March 3, 1863.

Order of service is based on the commencement of the senator's first term. Behind this is former service as a senator (only giving the senator seniority within their new incoming class), service as vice president, a House member, a cabinet secretary, or a governor of a state. The final factor is the population of the senator's state.

Senators who were sworn in during the middle of the Congress (up until the last senator who was not sworn in early after winning the November 1862 election) are listed at the end of the list with no number.

== Terms of service ==
Class	Terms of service of senators that expired in years
Class 1	Terms of service of senators that expired in 1863 (CA, CT, DE, FL, IN, MA, MD, ME, MI, MN, MO, MS, NJ, NY, OH, PA, RI, TN, TX, VA, VT, and WI.)
Class 2	Terms of service of senators that expired in 1865 (AL, AR, DE, GA, IA, IL, KS, KY, LA, MA, ME, MI, MN, MS, NC, NH, NJ, OR, RI, SC, TN, and TX.)
Class 3	Terms of service of senators that expired in 1867 (AL, AR, CA, CT, FL, GA, IA, IL, IN, KS, KY, LA, MD, MO, NC, NH, NY, OH, OR, PA, SC, VT, and WI.)

== U.S. Senate seniority list ==
U.S. Senate seniority
Rank	Senator (party-state)	Seniority date	Other factors
1	James Alfred Pearce (D-MD)	March 4, 1843	
2	Jesse D. Bright (D-IN)	March 4, 1845	
3	James M. Mason (D-VA)	January 21, 1847	
4	Stephen A. Douglas (D-IL)	March 4, 1847	
5	Robert M. T. Hunter (D-VA)	March 4, 1847	
6	William K. Sebastian (D-AR)	May 12, 1848	
7	Solomon Foot (R-VT)	March 4, 1851	
8	James A. Bayard Jr. (D-DE)	March 4, 1851	
9	Benjamin Wade (R-OH)	March 15, 1851	
10	Charles Sumner (LR-MA)	April 11, 1851	
11	John R. Thomson (D-NJ)	March 4, 1853	
12	William P. Fessenden (R-ME)	February 10, 1854	
13	Henry Wilson (R-MA)	January 31, 1855	
14	Lyman Trumbull (R-IL)	March 4, 1855	
15	Jacob Collamer (R-VT)	March 4, 1855	
16	Lafayette S. Foster (R-CT)	March 4, 1855	
17	John P. Hale (R-NH)	July 30, 1855	
18	James Harlan (R-IA)	January 29, 1857	
19	Zachariah Chandler (R-MI)	March 4, 1857	
20	James Dixon (R-CT)	March 4, 1857	
21	James R. Doolittle (R-WI)	March 4, 1857	
22	Anthony Kennedy (KN-MD)	March 4, 1857	
23	Trusten Polk (D-MO)	March 4, 1857	
24	Preston King (R-NY)	March 4, 1857	
25	James F. Simmons (R-RI)	March 4, 1857	
26	Daniel Clark (R-NH)	June 27, 1857	
27	Andrew Johnson (D-TN)	October 8, 1857	
28	Thomas Lanier Clingman (D-NC)	May 7, 1858	
29	Henry Mower Rice (D-MN)	May 11, 1858	
30	Henry B. Anthony (R-RI)	March 4, 1859	Former governor
31	Willard Saulsbury Sr. (D-DE)	March 4, 1859	
32	James W. Grimes (R-IA)	March 4, 1859	
33	Lazarus W. Powell (D-KY)	March 4, 1859	
34	Morton S. Wilkinson (R-MN)	March 4, 1859	
35	John C. Ten Eyck (R-NJ)	March 4, 1859	
36	Kinsley S. Bingham (D-MI)	March 4, 1859	
37	Thomas Bragg (D-NC)	March 4, 1859	
38	John Hemphill (D-TX)	March 4, 1859	
39	Louis Wigfall (D-TX)	December 5, 1859	
40	Milton Latham (LD-CA)	March 5, 1860	
41	Edward D. Baker (R-OR)	October 2, 1860	
42	Timothy O. Howe (R-WI)	March 4, 1861	
43	James A. McDougall (D-CA)	March 4, 1861	
44	Henry S. Lane (R-WI)	March 4, 1861	
45	Ira Harris (R-NJ)	March 4, 1861	
46	James Nesmith (D-OR)	March 4, 1861	
47	Edgar Cowan (R-PA)	March 4, 1861	
48	Charles B. Mitchel (D-AR)	March 4, 1861	
49	John C. Breckinridge (D-KY)	March 4, 1861	
50	Salmon P. Chase (D-OH)	March 4, 1861	
	David Wilmot (R-PA)	March 14, 1861	
	Waldo P. Johnson (D-MO)	March 17, 1861	
	John Sherman (R-OH)	March 21, 1861	
	Samuel C. Pomeroy (R-KS)	April 4, 1861	
	Jim Lane (R-KS)	April 4, 1861	
	Orville H. Browning (R-IL)	June 26, 1861	
	John S. Carlile (U-VA)	July 9, 1861	
	Waitman T. Willey (U-VA)	July 9, 1861	
	Benjamin Stark (D-OR)	October 29, 1861	
	Garrett Davis (U-KY)	December 23, 1861	
	Jacob M. Howard (R-MI)	January 17, 1862	
	John B. Henderson (U-MO)	January 17, 1862	
	Robert Wilson (U-MO)	January 17, 1862	
	Joseph A. Wright (D-IN)	February 24, 1862	
	Benjamin F. Harding (D-OR)	September 12, 1862	
	Richard Stockton Field (R-NJ)	November 21, 1862	
	Samuel G. Arnold (R-RI)	December 1, 1862	
	Thomas H. Hicks (U-MD)	December 29, 1862	
	William A. Richardson (D-IL)	January 12, 1863	
	David Turpie (D-IN)	January 14, 1863	
	James W. Wall (D-NJ)	January 14, 1863	

== See also ==
- 37th United States Congress
- List of United States representatives in the 37th Congress
