= John Banks (American politician) =

American politician (1793–1864)

18th Treasurer of Pennsylvania
- In office 1847–1848
- Governor: Francis R. Shunk
- Preceded by: James Ross Snowden
- Succeeded by: Arnold Plumer

Member of the U.S. House of Representatives from Pennsylvania
- In office March 4, 1831 – March 31, 1836
- Preceded by: Thomas Hale Sill
- Succeeded by: John James Pearson
- Constituency: 18th district (1831–1833); 24th district (1833–1836)

Personal details
- Born: October 17, 1793 Lewisburg, Pennsylvania, U.S.
- Died: April 3, 1864 (aged 70) Reading, Pennsylvania, U.S.
- Resting place: Charles Evans Cemetery
- Party: Anti-Masonic

John Banks (October 17, 1793 – April 3, 1864) was an Anti-Masonic member of the U.S. House of Representatives from Pennsylvania.

John Banks was born near Lewisburg, Pennsylvania. He studied law, was admitted to the bar and commenced practice in Juniata County, Pennsylvania, in 1819. He moved to Mercer County, Pennsylvania, and continued the practice of law.

Banks was elected as an Anti-Masonic candidate to the Twenty-second, Twenty-third, and Twenty-fourth Congresses and served until his resignation on March 31, 1836. He became judge of the Berks judicial district from May 1836 until he resigned to become State treasurer of Pennsylvania in 1847. He resumed the practice of law in Reading, Pennsylvania, where he died in 1864. Interment in Reading's Charles Evans Cemetery.

== Bibliography ==
- United States Congress. "John Banks (id: B000114)". Biographical Directory of the United States Congress.
- The Political Graveyard

Party political offices
First	Whig nominee for Governor of Pennsylvania; 1841	Succeeded by Joseph Markle
U.S. House of Representatives
Preceded by Thomas Hale Sill	Member of the U.S. House of Representatives from Pennsylvania's 18th congressional district 1831–1833	Succeeded by George Burd
Preceded by District Created	Member of the U.S. House of Representatives from Pennsylvania's 24th congressional district 1833–1836	Succeeded by John James Pearson
Political offices
Preceded by James Ross Snowden	Treasurer of Pennsylvania; 1847–1848	Succeeded by Arnold Plumer
