= Oscar L. Jackson =

American politician

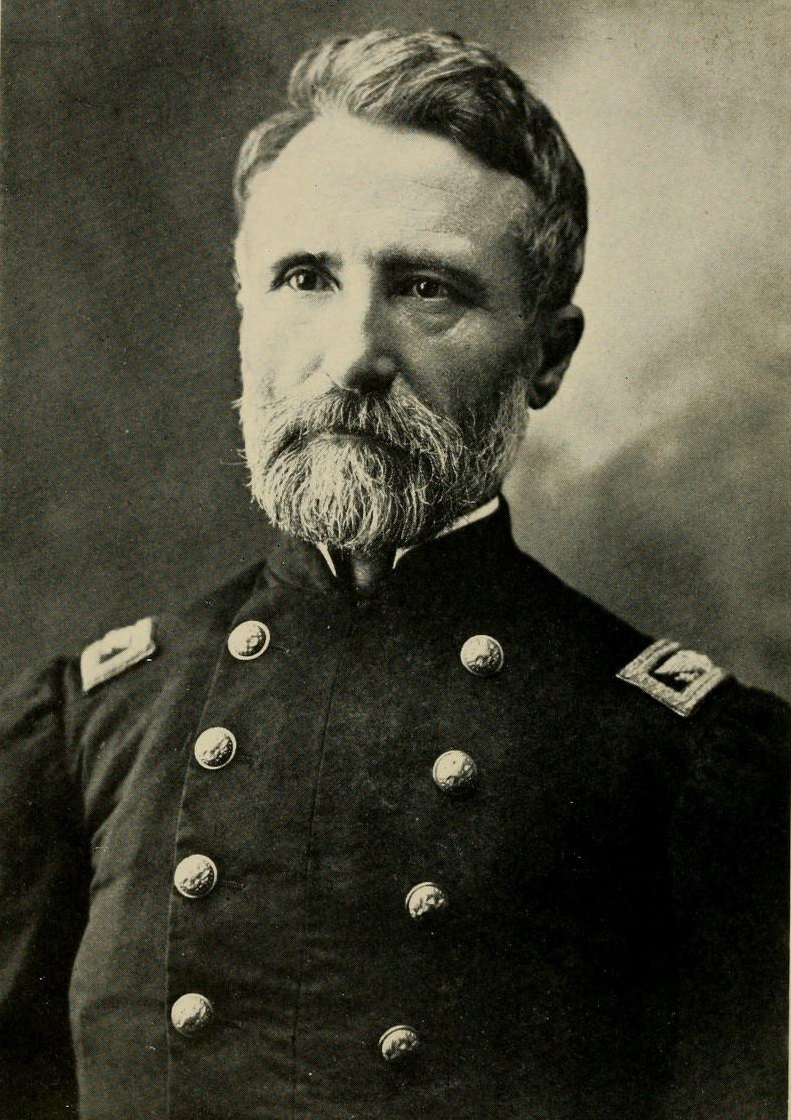
- From 1922's The Colonel's Diary: Journals Kept Before and During the Civil War

Member of the U.S. House of Representatives from Pennsylvania's 24th district
- In office March 4, 1885 – March 3, 1889
- Preceded by: George Van Eman Lawrence
- Succeeded by: Joseph Warren Ray

Personal details
- Born: September 2, 1840 Shenango Township, Pennsylvania
- Died: February 16, 1920 (aged 79) New Castle, Pennsylvania
- Party: Republican

Military service
- Allegiance: United States
- Branch/service: United States Army
- Rank: Colonel
- Battles/wars: American Civil War

Oscar Lawrence Jackson (September 2, 1840 – February 16, 1920) was a Republican member of the U.S. House of Representatives from Pennsylvania and the commander of an Ohio infantry regiment in the Union Army during the American Civil War.

== Biography ==
Oscar L. Jackson was born in Shenango Township, Pennsylvania to Samuel Stewart and Nancy (Mitchell) Jackson. He attended the common schools, Tansy Hill Select School, and Darlington Academy. He later taught school in Hocking County, Ohio.

During the Civil War, Jackson served as an officer in the Union Army from 1861 to 1865. He entered the service as the captain of Company H of the Sixty-third Regiment, Ohio Volunteer Infantry, and later received promotions of major, lieutenant colonel, and colonel by brevet after the war. He was shot in the face by a Confederate soldier with a Squirrel Rifle and left for dead in the 2nd Battle of Corinth.

After the war, Jackson studied law, was admitted to the bar in 1867, and commenced practice in New Castle, Pennsylvania. He served as district attorney from 1868 to 1871. He was a member of the commission to codify laws and devise a plan for the government of cities of Pennsylvania in 1877 and 1878.

His journal, edited by his brother Dr. David Prentice Jackson (1851-1929), was published posthumously in 1922 as The Colonel's Diary: Journals Kept Before and During the Civil War by the Late Colonel Oscar L. Jackson.

Jackson was elected as a Republican to the Forty-ninth and Fiftieth Congresses. He was an unsuccessful candidate for renomination in 1888. He resumed practicing law in New Castle and served as a delegate to the 1896 Republican National Convention.

Oscar L. Jackson died in New Castle in 1920 and was interred in Greenwood Cemetery.

U.S. House of Representatives
Preceded by George V. E. Lawrence	Member of the U.S. House of Representatives from Pennsylvania's 24th congressional district 1885–1889	Succeeded by Joseph W. Ray
