= Joseph Benton Donley =

American politician

Joseph B. Donley
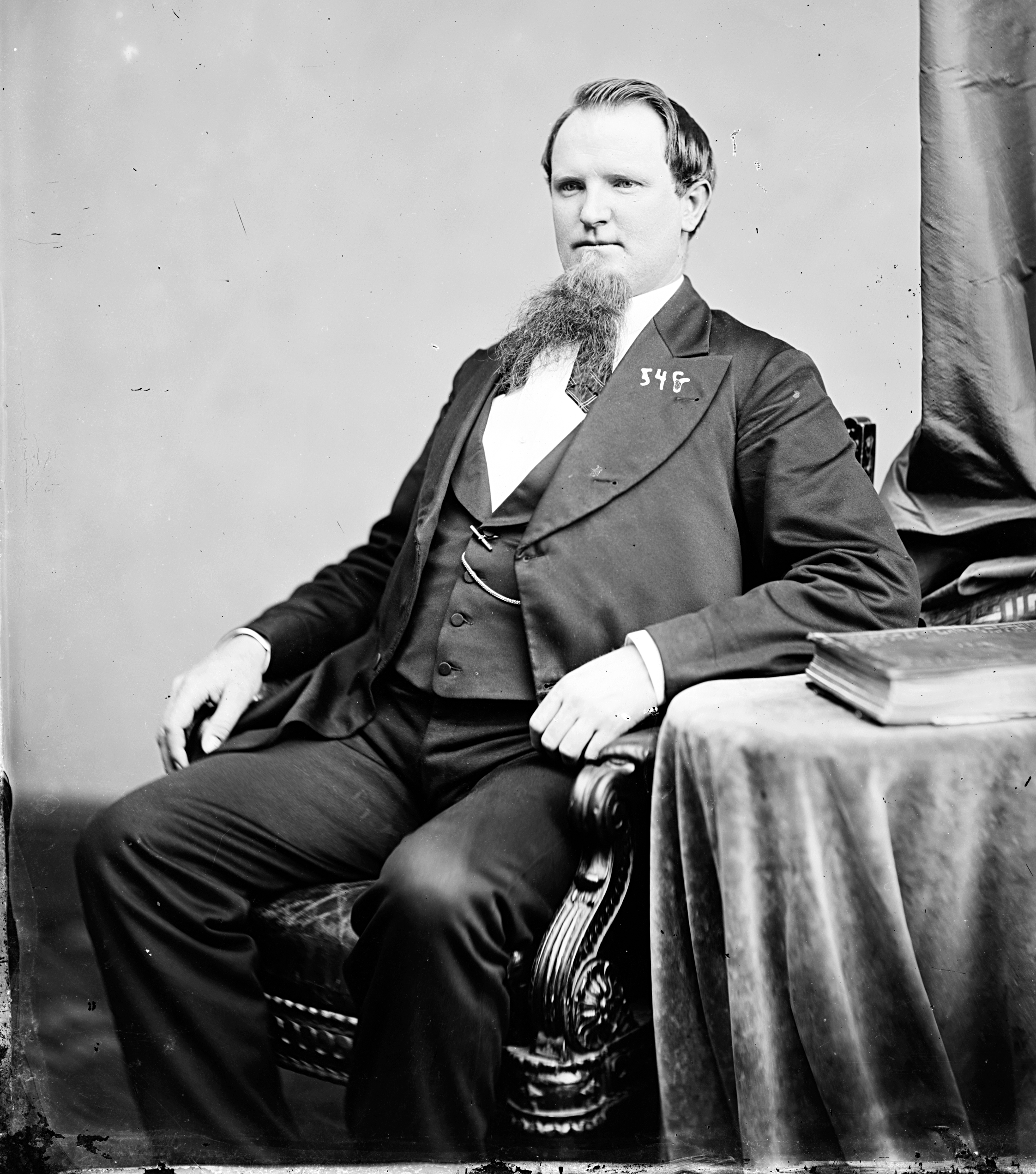
- Joseph B. Donley

Member of the U.S. House of Representatives from Pennsylvania's 24th district
- In office March 4, 1869 – March 3, 1871
- Preceded by: George Van Eman Lawrence
- Succeeded by: William McClelland

Personal details
- Born: October 10, 1838 Mount Morris, Pennsylvania
- Died: January 23, 1917 (aged 78) Waynesburg, Pennsylvania
- Party: Republican

Joseph Benton Donley (October 10, 1838 – January 23, 1917) was a Republican member of the U.S. House of Representatives from Pennsylvania.

== Biography ==
Joseph Benton Donley was born in Mount Morris, Pennsylvania. He completed preparatory studies, and graduated from Waynesburg College (now Waynesburg University) in Waynesburg, Pennsylvania in 1859. He was a member of the faculty of Abingdon College in Abingdon, Illinois, from 1860 to 1862.

He entered the Union Army as a captain in the 83rd Illinois Volunteer Infantry Regiment, in 1862 and served throughout the war.

He graduated from the Albany Law School in Albany, New York, in 1866. He was admitted to the bar in 1867 and commenced practice in Waynesburg, Pennsylvania. He served as a referee in bankruptcy in 1867 and 1868.

Donley was elected as a Republican to the Forty-first Congress. He was an unsuccessful candidate for reelection in 1870. He resumed the practice of his profession in Waynesburg and died there in 1917 at the age of 78. Interment in Green Mount Cemetery.

U.S. House of Representatives
Preceded by George V.E. Lawrence	Member of the U.S. House of Representatives from Pennsylvania's 24th congressional district March 4, 1869 – March 3, 1871	Succeeded by William McClelland
