= John James Pearson =

American politician

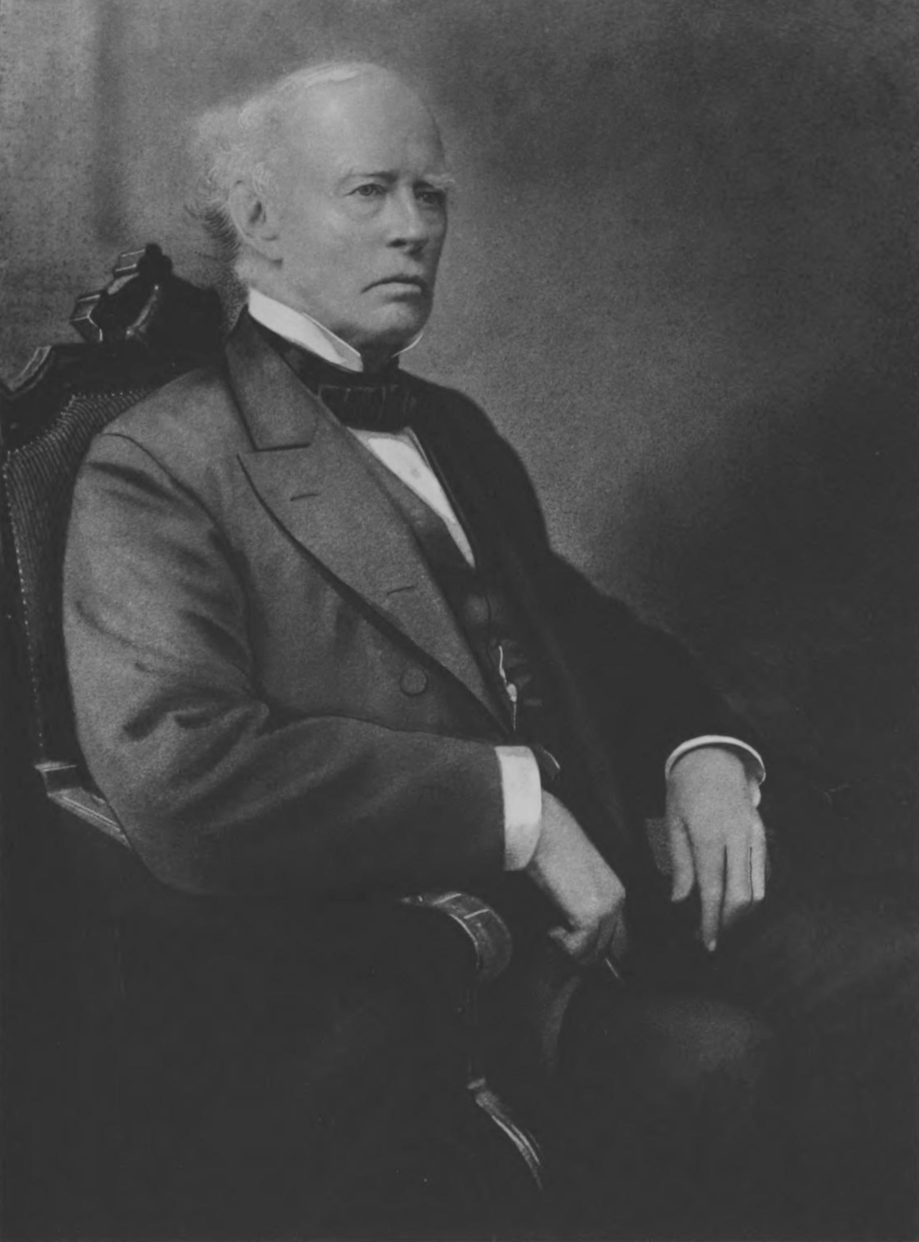

Member of the U.S. House of Representatives from Pennsylvania's 24th district
- In office December 5, 1836 – March 3, 1837
- Preceded by: John Banks
- Succeeded by: Thomas Henry

Member of the Pennsylvania State Senate
- In office 1838–1842
- Constituency: 20th district

Personal details
- Born: October 25, 1800 Delaware County, Pennsylvania
- Died: May 30, 1888 (aged 87) Harrisburg, Pennsylvania
- Resting place: Harrisburg Cemetery
- Party: Anti-Jacksonian; Whig
- Spouses: Ellen Hays (m. 1828; died 1840) Mary Harris Briggs (m. 1842)
- Occupation: Judge, politician

John James Pearson (October 25, 1800 – May 30, 1888) was an American politician and judge from Pennsylvania who served as an Anti-Jacksonian member of the U.S. House of Representatives.

== Biography ==
Pearson was born near Darby in Delaware County, Pennsylvania to Bevan and Anne (Warner) Pearson. He moved with his parents to Mercer, Pennsylvania, in 1805. He studied law, was admitted to the bar in August 1822 and commenced practice in Mercer County.

He married Ellen Hays on October 13, 1828. She died in February 1840, and he remarried to Mary Harris Briggs on July 12, 1842.

He was elected as an Anti-Jacksonian to the Twenty-fourth Congress to fill the vacancy caused by the resignation of John Banks and served from December 5, 1836, to March 3, 1837. He was not a candidate for renomination in 1836.

He resumed the practice of law and served as a Whig member of Pennsylvania State Senate for the 20th district from 1838 to 1842. He was appointed president judge of Dauphin and Lebanon Counties on April 7, 1849, and served until January 1, 1882.

He died at his home in Harrisburg, Pennsylvania on May 30, 1888, and was interred in Mount Kalmia Cemetery.

== Sources ==
- United States Congress. "John James Pearson (id: P000167)". Biographical Directory of the United States Congress.
- The Political Graveyard

U.S. House of Representatives
Preceded by John Banks	Member of the U.S. House of Representatives from Pennsylvania's 24th congressional district 1836–1837	Succeeded by Thomas Henry
Pennsylvania State Senate
Preceded by Isaac Leet	Member of the Pennsylvania Senate from the 20th district 1838–1842	Succeeded by William Stewart
