= William S. Moore =

American attorney, newspaper editor, and politician

William Sutton Moore

Member of the U.S. House of Representatives from Pennsylvania's 24th congressional district
- In office March 4, 1873 – March 3, 1875
- Preceded by: William McClelland
- Succeeded by: John W. Wallace

Treasurer of Washington County, Pennsylvania
- In office February 22, 1862 – November 13, 1863
- Preceded by: James Pollock
- Succeeded by: J. W. Douds

Prothonotary of Washington County, Pennsylvania
- In office October 14, 1854 – October 11, 1857
- Preceded by: James Brown
- Succeeded by: James B. Ruple

Personal details
- Born: November 18, 1822 Amity, Pennsylvania, U.S.
- Died: December 30, 1877 (aged 55) Washington, Pennsylvania, U.S.
- Resting place: Washington Cemetery, Washington, Pennsylvania
- Party: Republican
- Spouse: Elizabeth Leamon Brownlee (m. 1850)
- Children: 3
- Relatives: Alexander Patch (grandson); Joseph D. Patch (grandson)
- Education: Washington College
- Profession: Attorney; Newspaper editor

William Sutton Moore (November 18, 1822 – December 30, 1877) was an American lawyer, newspaper editor, and politician from Washington, Pennsylvania. A Republican, he was most notable for his service as a member of the United States House of Representatives from 1873 to 1875.

A native of Amity, Pennsylvania, Moore graduated from Washington College (now Washington and Jefferson College) in 1847, studied law, and attained admitted to the bar in 1848. Moore practiced in Washington, Pennsylvania. Moore became active in politics as a Republican, and served as Washington County Prothonotary from 1854 to 1857, and Washington County Treasurer from 1863 to 1866. Beginning in 1857, Moore was part-owner and publisher of the Reporter, a local newspaper.

In 1872, Moore was a successful candidate for the United States House of Representatives. He served one term, March 4, 1873 to March 3, 1875. He was an unsuccessful candidate for reelection in 1874.

Moore was often in ill health after being diagnosed with throat cancer in the mid-1850s. His health rapidly declined in mid-1877, and he died in Washington on December 30, 1877. He was buried at Washington Cemetery in Washington.

== Biography ==
Moore was born in Amity, Pennsylvania on November 18, 1822, the son of James and Ann (Sutton) Moore. (Note: Some sources indicate that Moore was born in South Bethlehem, Pennsylvania.) His mother died when he was young, and he was raised by his uncle and aunt, Hugh and Sarah Moore. He attended the local schools, and in 1842 began attendance at Washington College (now Washington and Jefferson College), from which he graduated in 1847. Three of Moore's college classmates went on to serve in Congress: James G. Blaine (Maine); John V. Le Moyne (Illinois); and William Henry Mills Pusey (Iowa).

While attending college, Moore also began the study of law in the office of Thomas McKean Thompson McKennan. He was admitted to the bar in 1848 and began to practice in Washington, Pennsylvania.

== Career ==
A Republican from the time the party was founded in the 1850s, Moore served as prothonotary of Washington County from 1854 to 1857. He was a delegate to the 1856 Republican National Convention. He resigned as prothonotary after being diagnosed with throat cancer, and he endured bouts of ill health as his condition worsened over time. In 1857, he became one of the owners of the Reporter newspaper, and also served as the paper's editor. Moore remained affiliated with the Reporter until his death. From 1863 to 1866, Moore served as Washington County Treasurer.

=== Congressman ===
In 1872, Moore was elected to the United States House of Representatives and he served one term, March 4, 1873 to March 3, 1875. He was an unsuccessful candidate for renomination in 1874.

During his Congressional term, Moore served on the Committee on Revision of the Laws of the United States. As part of this committee, he oversaw the work to revise Title 38, the federal statutes related to currency and monetary policy.

== Death and burial ==
After leaving Congress, Moore resumed his work as editor of the Reporter. In August 1877, his health took a turn for the worse, and he visited cancer specialists in Philadelphia. He retired in October, and his health continued to worsen. Moore died in Washington, Pennsylvania on December 30, 1877. He was interred at Washington Cemetery in Washington.

== Family ==
On January 23, 1850, Moore married Elizabeth Leamon Brownlee of Canton Township. They were the parents of three children: Annie, Alice, and Joseph Henderson.

Annie Moore was the wife of United States Army Captain and railroad executive Alexander McCarrell Patch, and the mother of General Alexander Patch and Major General Joseph D. Patch.

== See also ==
- United States Congress

== Notes ==
U.S. House of Representatives
Preceded by William McClelland	Member of the U.S. House of Representatives from Pennsylvania's 24th congressional district 1873–1875	Succeeded by John W. Wallace
