= George V. Lawrence =

American politician (1818–1904)

George V. E. Lawrence
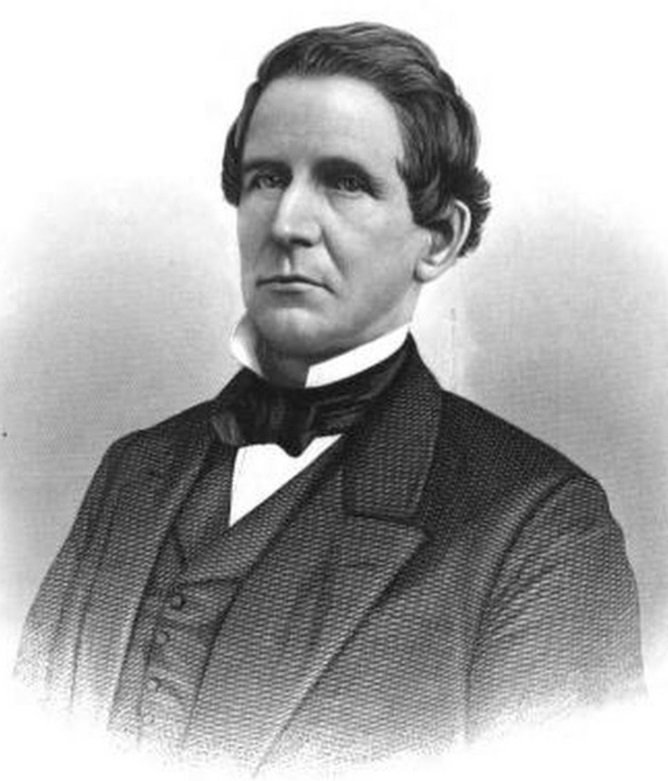
- From Volume 1 of 1869's The Fortieth Congress of the United States: Historical and Biographical

Member of the U.S. House of Representatives from Pennsylvania's 24th district
- In office March 4, 1883 – March 3, 1885
- Preceded by: William S. Shallenberger
- Succeeded by: Oscar L. Jackson
- In office March 4, 1865 – March 3, 1869
- Preceded by: Jesse Lazear
- Succeeded by: Joseph D. Donley

Member of the Pennsylvania Senate
- In office 1849-1851; 1861-1863; 1875; 1876; 1878

Member of the Pennsylvania House of Representatives
- In office 1844; 1847; 1858; 1859; 1891-1893

Personal details
- Born: November 13, 1818 Washington County, Pennsylvania, US
- Died: October 2, 1904 (aged 85) Monongahela, Pennsylvania, US
- Party: Republican
- Education: Washington College

George Van Eman Lawrence (November 13, 1818 – October 2, 1904) was a Republican member of the U.S. House of Representatives from Pennsylvania.

== Biography ==
George Van Eman Lawrence (son of Joseph Lawrence) was born in Washington County, Pennsylvania. He attended the common schools and Washington College (now Washington & Jefferson College) in Washington, Pennsylvania. He was engaged in agricultural pursuits.

Lawrence was a member of the Pennsylvania State House of Representatives in 1844, 1847, 1858, and 1859. He served in the Pennsylvania State Senate from 1849 to 1851 and 1861 to 1863. He presided over the senate in 1863.

Lawrence was elected as a Republican to the Thirty-ninth and Fortieth Congresses. He was not a candidate for renomination in 1868. He was a delegate to the State constitutional convention in 1872. He was a member of the State Senate under the new constitution in 1875, 1876, and 1878. He was again elected as a Republican to the Forty-eighth Congress. He was not a candidate for renomination in 1884. He was again served in the Pennsylvania State House of Representatives from 1893 to 1896.

He died in Monongahela, Pennsylvania in 1904, aged 85, and was interred in the City Cemetery.

== Sources ==
- United States Congress. "George V. Lawrence (id: L000134)". Biographical Directory of the United States Congress.
- The Political Graveyard

U.S. House of Representatives
Preceded by Jesse Lazear	Member of the U.S. House of Representatives from Pennsylvania's 24th congressional district 1865–1869	Succeeded by Joseph B. Donley
Preceded by William S. Shallenberger	Member of the U.S. House of Representatives from Pennsylvania's 24th congressional district 1883–1885	Succeeded by Oscar L. Jackson
