= William S. Shallenberger =

Union Army soldier

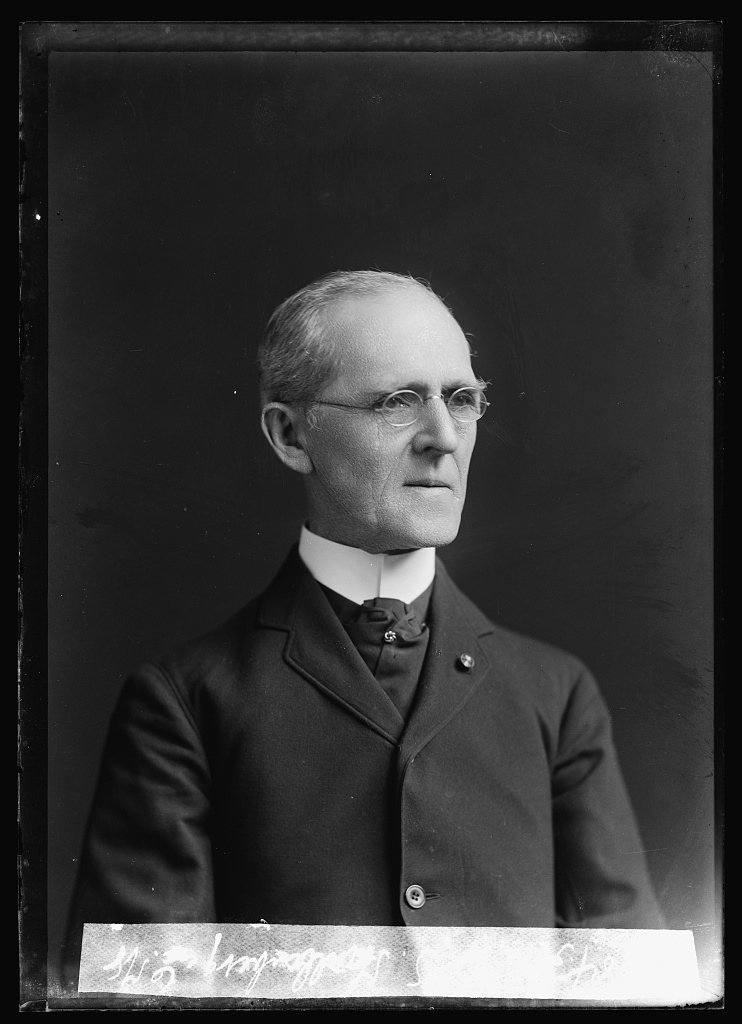
William Shadrack Shallenberger in C. M. Bell Studio

William Shadrack Shallenberger (November 24, 1839 – April 15, 1914) was a Republican member of the U.S. House of Representatives from Pennsylvania.

== Biography ==
William S. Shallenberger was born in Mount Pleasant, Pennsylvania. He attended the public schools and Mount Pleasant Academy. He graduated from Lewisburg University (now Bucknell University) in Lewisburg, Pennsylvania, in 1862. He was a member of Phi Kappa Psi. He engaged in mercantile pursuits.

During the American Civil War, Shallenberger commissioned in the Union Army in 1862 in the One Hundred and Fortieth Regiment, Pennsylvania Volunteer Infantry, and soon afterward was appointed adjutant of the regiment. He was mustered out of the service in October 1864 and again engaged in mercantile pursuits in Rochester, Pennsylvania. He served as chairman of the Beaver County Republican committee in 1872 and 1874.

Shallenberger was elected as a Republican to the Forty-fifth, Forty-sixth, and Forty-seventh Congresses. He served as chairman of the United States House Committee on Public Buildings and Grounds during the Forty-seventh Congress. He was appointed by President William McKinley as Second Assistant Postmaster General and served from 1897 to 1907.

Schallenberger was also active in Baptist life. He served from 1904 to 1906 as President of the Home Mission Society. He was a member of the committee that created the Northern Baptist Convention in 1907 at Washington's Calvary Baptist Church where he served as a Deacon and Sunday School Superintendent.

He died in Washington, D.C., in 1914. He was interred in Arlington National Cemetery.

== Notes ==
U.S. House of Representatives
Preceded by John W. Wallace	Member of the U.S. House of Representatives from Pennsylvania's 24th congressional district 1877–1883	Succeeded by George V. E. Lawrence
