= David Barclay (American politician) =

American politician

Member of the U.S. House of Representatives from Pennsylvania's 24th district
- In office March 4, 1855 – March 3, 1857
- Preceded by: John Dick
- Succeeded by: James L. Gillis

Personal details
- Born: 1823 Punxsutawney, Pennsylvania, U.S.
- Died: September 10, 1889 (aged 65–66) Freeport, Pennsylvania, U.S.
- Party: Democratic
- Education: Washington & Jefferson College

David Barclay (1823 – September 10, 1889) was a Democratic member of the U.S. House of Representatives from Pennsylvania.

== Biography ==
Born in Punxsutawney, Pennsylvania in 1823, Barclay attended Washington College (now Washington & Jefferson College) in Washington, Pennsylvania. He studied law in Pittsburgh, was admitted to the bar and practiced in Punxsutawney, Brookville, and Kittanning, Pennsylvania.

He became one of the editors and publishers of the Pittsburgh Union and Legal Journal, and worked in that capacity from 1850 to 1855.

While a resident of Brookville, Barclay was elected as a Democrat to the Thirty-fourth Congress.

At the end of his legislative career, he resumed the practice of law.

== Death and interment ==
Barclay died in Freeport, Pennsylvania on September 10, 1889, and was interred in the Freeport Cemetery.

== Bibliography ==
- Barclay, David (January 7, 1857). Speech of Hon. D. Barclay, of Pennsylvania, on the President's message: in the House of Representatives. Capital City Office.

U.S. House of Representatives
Preceded by John Dick	Member of the U.S. House of Representatives from Pennsylvania's 24th congressional district 1855–1857	Succeeded by James L. Gillis
