= Alexander Irvin =

American politician

Member of the U.S. House of Representatives from Pennsylvania's 24th district
- In office March 4, 1847 – March 3, 1849
- Preceded by: Joseph Buffington
- Succeeded by: Alfred Gilmore

Member of the Pennsylvania Senate for the 13th district
- In office 1837–1838
- Preceded by: Henry Petrikin
- Succeeded by: Elihu Case

Personal details
- Born: January 18, 1800 Centre County, Pennsylvania, US
- Died: March 20, 1874 (aged 74) Clearfield, Pennsylvania, US
- Party: Whig

Alexander Irvin (January 18, 1800 – March 20, 1874) was an American politician from Pennsylvania who served as a Whig member of the United States House of Representatives for Pennsylvania's 24th congressional district from 1847 to 1849.

== Early life ==
Alexander Irvin was born in Penns Valley, Centre County, Pennsylvania. He attended the public schools of the area and moved to Curwensville in 1820 and to Clearfield, Pennsylvania in 1826. He engaged in mercantile and lumbering pursuits and was the treasurer of Clearfield County from 1828 to 1830.

== Career ==
Irvin was a member of the Pennsylvania State Senate for the 13th district from 1837 to 1838. He was named the prothonotary of the Court of Common Pleas in 1842. He was the recorder of deeds and register of wills of Clearfield County from 1842 to 1844.

He was elected as a Whig to the Thirtieth Congress (March 4, 1847 - March 3, 1849). He was not a candidate for renomination. He was a United States marshal for the western district of Pennsylvania from January 17 to September 3, 1850, when he resigned. He was named a delegate to the Republican National Convention in 1872. He then became engaged in mercantile pursuits at Clearfield until his death in 1874.

== Notes ==
U.S. House of Representatives
Preceded by Joseph Buffington	Member of the U.S. House of Representatives from Pennsylvania's 24th congressional district 1847–1849	Succeeded by Alfred Gilmore
Pennsylvania State Senate
Preceded by Henry Petrikin	Member of the Pennsylvania Senate, 13th district 1835-1838	Succeeded by Elihu Case
