= Joseph W. Ray =

American politician

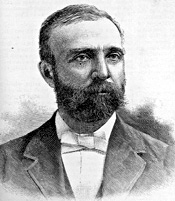
Picture of Joseph Warren Ray

Joseph Warren Ray (May 25, 1849 – September 15, 1928) was a Republican member of the U.S. House of Representatives from Pennsylvania.

Joseph W. Ray was born near Nineveh, Pennsylvania. He attended the common schools and was graduated from Waynesburg College in Waynesburg, Pennsylvania, in 1874. He studied law, was admitted to the bar in 1876 and commenced practice in Waynesburg. Ray was elected as a Republican to the Fifty-first Congress. He was an unsuccessful candidate for renomination in 1890.

He resumed the practice of law in Waynesburg and served as a trustee of Waynesburg College from 1902 until his death. He was elected president judge of the thirteenth judicial district of Pennsylvania in 1915 and served until 1926. He declined to be a candidate for reelection, and again resumed the practice of law in Waynesburg, where he died in 1928. Interment in Greenmont Cemetery.

== Sources ==
- United States Congress. "Joseph W. Ray (id: R000078)". Biographical Directory of the United States Congress.
- The Political Graveyard

U.S. House of Representatives
Preceded by Oscar L. Jackson	Member of the U.S. House of Representatives from Pennsylvania's 24th congressional district 1889–1891	Succeeded by Andrew Stewart
