= James Lisle Gillis =

American politician

James L. Gillis
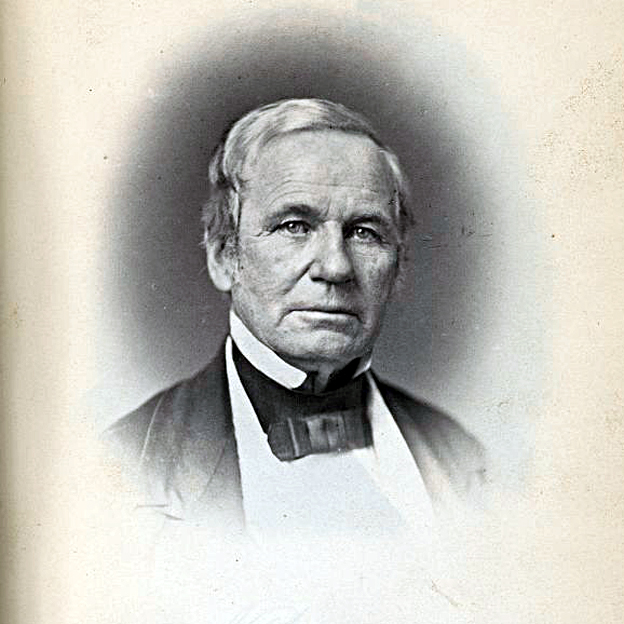

Member of the U.S. House of Representatives from Pennsylvania's 24th district
- In office March 4, 1857 – March 3, 1859
- Preceded by: David Barclay
- Succeeded by: Chapin Hall

Personal details
- Born: October 2, 1792 Hebron, New York, U.S.
- Died: July 8, 1881 (aged 89) Mount Pleasant, Iowa, U.S.
- Party: Democratic
- Relations: James Henry Gillis (Son)
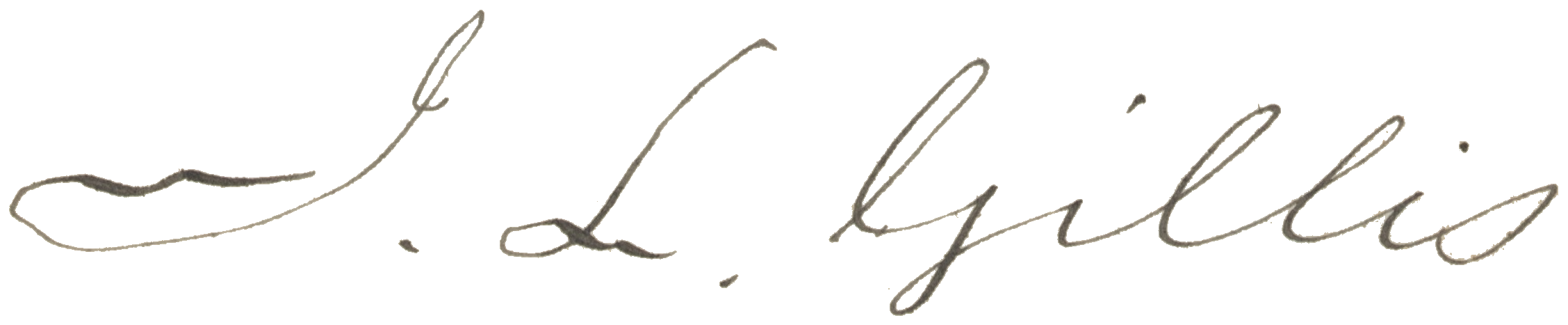
- Signature

James Lisle Gillis (October 2, 1792 – July 8, 1881) was a Democratic member of the U.S. House of Representatives from Pennsylvania.

== Biography ==
James L. Gillis was born in Hebron, New York. He attended the public schools and became a tanner. He served in the cavalry during the War of 1812. In July 1814, Gillis participated in the Battle of Chippawa and was wounded at the Battle of Lundy's Lane. Two weeks later, he was captured and held as a prisoner of war in Canada until November 1814. Gillis escaped just prior to being sent by ship to England, but was soon recaptured and held at Halifax, Nova Scotia until the end of the war in February 1815.

Gillis moved to Ridgway, Pennsylvania, in 1822, and was appointed associate judge of Jefferson County, Pennsylvania, by Governor David R. Porter. He was a member of the Pennsylvania House of Representatives in 1840 and 1851. He was one of the judges of Jefferson County in 1842, and a member of the Pennsylvania State Senate in 1845. Gillis also served as a mail agent in San Francisco, California.

Gillis was elected as a Democrat to the Thirty-fifth Congress. He was an unsuccessful candidate for reelection in 1858. He was appointed agent for the Pawnee Tribe of Indians. He died in Mount Pleasant, Iowa, in 1881. Interment in Forest Home Cemetery.

Gillis married Mary Brockden Ridgway in 1816. They had two sons and a daughter. After his first wife's death in 1826, he remarried with Cecilia Ann Berray. They had four sons and three daughters, including U.S. Navy officer James Henry Gillis.

== Sources ==
- United States Congress. "James Lisle Gillis (id: G000209)". Biographical Directory of the United States Congress.
- The Political Graveyard

U.S. House of Representatives
Preceded by David Barclay	Member of the U.S. House of Representatives from Pennsylvania's 24th congressional district 1857–1859	Succeeded by Chapin Hall
