= William McClelland (politician) =

American politician

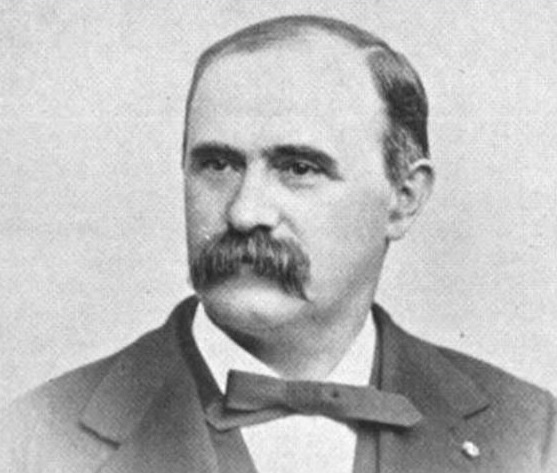
From 1892's, Journal of the Twenty-sixth National Encampment, Grand Army of the Republic

William McClelland (March 2, 1842 – February 7, 1892) was a Democratic member of the U.S. House of Representatives from Pennsylvania.

== Formative years ==
Born in Mount Jackson, Pennsylvania, on March 2, 1842, McClelland attended Westminster College in New Wilmington, Pennsylvania.

He served in the American Civil War for four years, mustering out as captain of Battery B, 1st Pennsylvania Light Artillery. He the attended Allegheny College, studied law, and was admitted to the bar.

== Career ==
Following the completion of his legal studies, McClelland opened a private law practice in Mount Jackson in 1870.

Elected as a Democrat to the Forty-second Congress, McClelland was an unsuccessful candidate for reelection in 1872. He resumed the practice of his profession and, in January 1891, he was appointed adjutant general of the Pennsylvania National Guard, a position he held until his death.

== Death and interment ==
McClelland died in Harrisburg, Pennsylvania, on February 7, 1892, and was interred in the Allegheny Cemetery in Pittsburgh, Pennsylvania.

== Sources ==
- United States Congress. "William McClelland (id: M000335)". Biographical Directory of the United States Congress.
- The Political Graveyard

U.S. House of Representatives
Preceded by Joseph B. Donley	Member of the U.S. House of Representatives from Pennsylvania's 24th congressional district 1871–1873	Succeeded by William S. Moore
