= Pennsylvania's 24th congressional district =

Former U.S. House district in Pennsylvania

Coordinates: 42°00′N 80°00′W

- Obsolete district
- Created: 1830
- Eliminated: 1980
- Years active: 1833-1983

Pennsylvania's 24th congressional district was one of Pennsylvania's districts of the United States House of Representatives.

== History ==
The 24th congressional district of Pennsylvania was created in 1833, during a period of nationwide expansion in the House of Representatives following the 1830 census. Over the course of its existence, the district's boundaries shifted multiple times in response to population changes documented by subsequent censuses. These changes reflected the evolving demographics and political landscape of Pennsylvania throughout the 19th and 20th centuries.

The district encompassed various regions of the state during its history, at times including parts of northwestern Pennsylvania, such as Erie and Crawford counties, as well as other areas in the western and central portions of the state. The specific composition of the district was altered with each redistricting cycle, as the state legislature responded to shifts in population and political priorities.

Pennsylvania's 24th district sent a number of representatives to Congress, some of whom played significant roles in national and state politics. Throughout its existence, the district was represented by members of several political parties, reflecting the broader trends in Pennsylvania's political alignment over time.

Following the 1980 United States census, Pennsylvania's representation in Congress was reduced due to slower population growth relative to other states. As a result, the state underwent a significant redistricting process, and the 24th congressional district was eliminated in 1983, with its territory redistributed among neighboring districts.

== List of representatives ==
Representative	Party	Years	Congress	Note
District established March 4, 1833
John Banks (Mercer)	Anti-Masonic	March 4, 1833 – April 2, 1836	23rd 24th	Redistricted from the 18th district and re-elected in 1832. Re-elected in 1834. Resigned to become the judge of the Berks judicial district.
Vacant		April 2, 1836 – December 5, 1836	24th	
John James Pearson (Mercer)	Anti-Jacksonian	December 5, 1836 – March 3, 1837	24th	Elected to finish Banks's term. Not a candidate for renomination in 1836.
Thomas Henry (Beaver)	Anti-Masonic	March 4, 1837 – March 3, 1841	25th 26th 27th	Elected in 1836. Re-elected in 1838. Re-elected in 1840. [data missing]
Thomas Henry (Beaver)	Whig	March 4, 1841 – March 3, 1843	25th 26th 27th	Elected in 1836. Re-elected in 1838. Re-elected in 1840. [data missing]
Joseph Buffington (Kittanning)	Whig	March 4, 1843 – March 3, 1847	28th 29th	Elected in 1843. Re-elected in 1844. Not a candidate for renomination in 1846.
Alexander Irvin (Clearfield)	Whig	March 4, 1847 – March 3, 1849	30th	Elected in 1846. Not a candidate for renomination in 1848.
Alfred Gilmore (Butler)	Democratic	March 4, 1849 – March 3, 1853	31st 32nd	Elected in 1848. Re-elected in 1850. Not a candidate for reelection in 1852.
Carlton B. Curtis (Warren)	Democratic	March 4, 1853 – March 3, 1855	33rd	Redistricted from the 23rd district and re-elected in 1852. [data missing]
David Barclay (Punxsutawney)	Democratic	March 4, 1855 – March 3, 1857	34th	Elected in 1854. [data missing]
James L. Gillis (Ridgway)	Democratic	March 4, 1857 – March 3, 1859	35th	Elected in 1856. Lost re-election.
Chapin Hall (Warren)	Republican	March 4, 1859 – March 3, 1861	36th	Elected in 1858. Not a candidate for renomination in 1860.
John Patton (Curwensville)	Republican	March 4, 1861 – March 3, 1863	37th	Elected in 1860. Not a candidate for renomination in 1862.
Jesse Lazear (Waynesburg)	Democratic	March 4, 1863 – March 3, 1865	38th	Redistricted from the 20th district and re-elected in 1862. Not a candidate for renomination in 1864.
George V. E. Lawrence (Monongahela)	Republican	March 4, 1865 – March 3, 1869	39th 40th	Elected in 1864. Re-elected in 1866. Not a candidate for renomination in 1868.
Joseph B. Donley (Waynesburg)	Republican	March 4, 1869 – March 3, 1871	41st	Elected in 1868. Lost re-election.
William McClelland (Mount Jackson)	Democratic	March 4, 1871 – March 3, 1873	42nd	Elected in 1870. Lost re-election.
William S. Moore (Washington)	Republican	March 4, 1873 – March 3, 1875	43rd	Elected in 1872. [data missing]
John W. Wallace (New Castle)	Republican	March 4, 1875 – March 3, 1877	44th	Elected in 1874. Not a candidate for renomination in 1876.
William S. Shallenberger (Rochester)	Republican	March 4, 1877 – March 3, 1883	45th 46th 47th	Elected in 1876. Re-elected in 1878. Re-elected in 1880. [data missing]
George V. E. Lawrence (Monongahela)	Republican	March 4, 1883 – March 3, 1885	48th	Elected in 1882. Not a candidate for renomination in 1884.
Oscar L. Jackson (New Castle)	Republican	March 4, 1885 – March 3, 1889	49th 50th	Elected in 1884. Re-elected in 1886. Lost renomination.
Joseph W. Ray (Waynesburg)	Republican	March 4, 1889 – March 3, 1891	51st	Elected in 1888. Lost renomination.
Andrew Stewart (Uniontown)	Republican	March 4, 1891 – February 26, 1892	52nd	Lost election contest.
Alexander K. Craig (Pittsburgh)	Democratic	February 26, 1892 – July 29, 1892	52nd	Won election contest. Died.
Vacant		July 29, 1892 – December 5, 1892	52nd	
William A. Sipe (Pittsburgh)	Democratic	December 5, 1892 – March 3, 1895	52nd 53rd	Elected to finish Craig's term. Re-elected in 1892. Lost renomination.
Ernest F. Acheson (Washington)	Republican	March 4, 1895 – March 3, 1909	54th 55th 56th 57th 58th 59th 60th	Elected in 1894. Re-elected in 1896. Re-elected in 1898. Re-elected in 1900. Re-elected in 1902. Re-elected in 1904. Re-elected in 1906. Lost renomination.
John K. Tener (Charleroi)	Republican	March 4, 1909 – January 16, 1911	61st	Elected in 1908. Resigned to become Governor of Pennsylvania.
Vacant		January 16, 1911 – March 3, 1911	61st	
Charles Matthews (New Castle)	Republican	March 4, 1911 – March 3, 1913	62nd	Re-elected in 1910. Lost re-election.
Henry W. Temple (Washington)	Progressive	March 4, 1913 – March 3, 1915	63rd	Elected in 1912. Lost re-election.
Vacant		March 4, 1915 – November 2, 1915	64th	
Henry W. Temple (Washington)	Republican	November 2, 1915 – March 3, 1923	64th 65th 66th 67th	Installed after being elected to replace Rep-elect William M. Brown who died before taking office. Re-elected in 1916. Re-elected in 1918; Re-elected in 1920. Redistricted to the 25th district.
Samuel A. Kendall (Meyersdale)	Republican	March 4, 1923 – January 8, 1933	68th 69th 70th 71st 72nd	Redistricted from the 23rd district and re-elected in 1922. Re-elected in 1924. Re-elected in 1926. Re-elected in 1928. Re-elected in 1930. Lost re-election. Died.
Vacant		January 8, 1933 – March 4, 1933	72nd	
J. Buell Snyder (Perryopolis)	Democratic	March 4, 1933 – January 3, 1945	73rd 74th 75th 76th 77th 78th	Elected in 1932. Re-elected in 1934. Re-elected in 1936. Re-elected in 1938. Re-elected in 1940. Re-elected in 1942. Redistricted to the 23rd district.
Thomas E. Morgan (Fredericktown)	Democratic	January 3, 1945 – January 3, 1953	79th 80th 81st 82nd	Elected in 1944. Re-elected in 1946. Re-elected in 1948. Re-elected in 1950. Redistricted to the 26th district.
Carroll D. Kearns (Farrell)	Republican	January 3, 1953 – January 3, 1963	83rd 84th 85th 86th 87th	Redistricted from the 28th district and re-elected in 1952. Re-elected in 1954. Re-elected in 1956. Re-elected in 1958. Re-elected in 1960. Lost renomination.
James D. Weaver (Erie)	Republican	January 3, 1963 – January 3, 1965	88th	Elected in 1962. Lost re-election.
Joseph P. Vigorito (Erie)	Democratic	January 3, 1965 – January 3, 1977	89th 90th 91st 92nd 93rd 94th	Re-elected in 1964. Re-elected in 1966. Re-elected in 1968. Re-elected in 1970. Re-elected in 1972. Re-elected in 1974. Lost re-election.
Marc L. Marks (Sharon)	Republican	January 3, 1977 – January 3, 1983	95th 96th 97th	Elected in 1976. Re-elected in 1978. Re-elected in 1980. Redistricted to the 21st district and retired.
District dissolved January 3, 1983
