= Michael C. Trout =

American politician

Michael Carver Trout (September 30, 1810 – June 25, 1873) was an American politician who served one term as a Democratic member of the U.S. House of Representatives from Pennsylvania from 1853 to 1855.

== Biography ==
Trout was born in Hickory Township, Pennsylvania. He received a very limited education, and was employed as a hatter for three years and then became a carpenter and contractor.

=== Early career and education ===
He served as president of the Hickory Township School Board for twenty years. He was elected burgess of Sharon in 1841, recorder of Mercer County, Pennsylvania, from 1842 to 1845, and prothonotary from 1846 to 1851.

=== Congress ===
Trout was elected as a Democrat to the Thirty-third Congress. He was an unsuccessful candidate for reelection.

=== Later career ===
After leaving Congress, he engaged in iron manufacturing, banking, and coal mining.

=== Death and burial ===
He died in Hickory Township in 1873. Interment in Morefield Cemetery in Hickory Township, near Sharon, Pennsylvania.

== Sources ==
- United States Congress. "Michael C. Trout (id: T000383)". Biographical Directory of the United States Congress.
- The Political Graveyard

U.S. House of Representatives
Preceded by Carlton B. Curtis	Member of the U.S. House of Representatives from Pennsylvania's 23rd congressional district 1853–1855	Succeeded by John Allison
