= John Patton (Pennsylvania politician) =

American politician

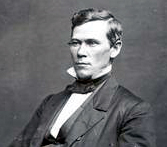
Portrait of John Patton

John Patton (January 6, 1823 – December 23, 1897) was a U.S. representative from the U.S. state of Pennsylvania. He was the father of Charles Emory Patton, also a U.S. representative from Pennsylvania (1911–1915); Alexander Ennis Patton, a Pennsylvania state senator; John Patton Jr., a U.S. senator from Michigan (1894–1895); and the uncle of William Irvin Swoope, also a U.S. representative from Pennsylvania (1923–1927).

Patton was born in Covington Township, Tioga County, Pennsylvania and moved to Curwensville, Pennsylvania in 1828. He attended the public schools and engaged in mercantile pursuits and lumbering 1844–1860.

He organized the First National Bank of Curwensville in 1864 and was elected its president. He then organized the Curwensville Bank, and was elected its president.

He was a delegate to the Whig National Convention in 1852 and to the Republican National Convention in 1860.

Patton was elected as a Republican to the Thirty-seventh Congress, serving from March 4, 1861, to March 3, 1863. He declined to be a candidate for renomination in 1862. He was again elected to the Fiftieth Congress, serving from March 4, 1887, to March 3, 1889. He was not a candidate for renomination in 1888, after which he resumed banking.

Patton died in Philadelphia, aged 74, where he had gone for medical treatment, and was interred in Oak Hill Cemetery, in Curwensville, Pennsylvania.

== Recognition ==
The town of Patton, Pennsylvania is named for John Patton.

U.S. House of Representatives
Preceded by Chapin Hall	Member of the U.S. House of Representatives from Pennsylvania's 24th congressional district 1861–1863	Succeeded by Jesse Lazear
Preceded by Andrew G. Curtin	Member of the U.S. House of Representatives from Pennsylvania's 20th congressional district 1887–1889	Succeeded by Edward Scull
