= John Winfield Wallace =

American politician

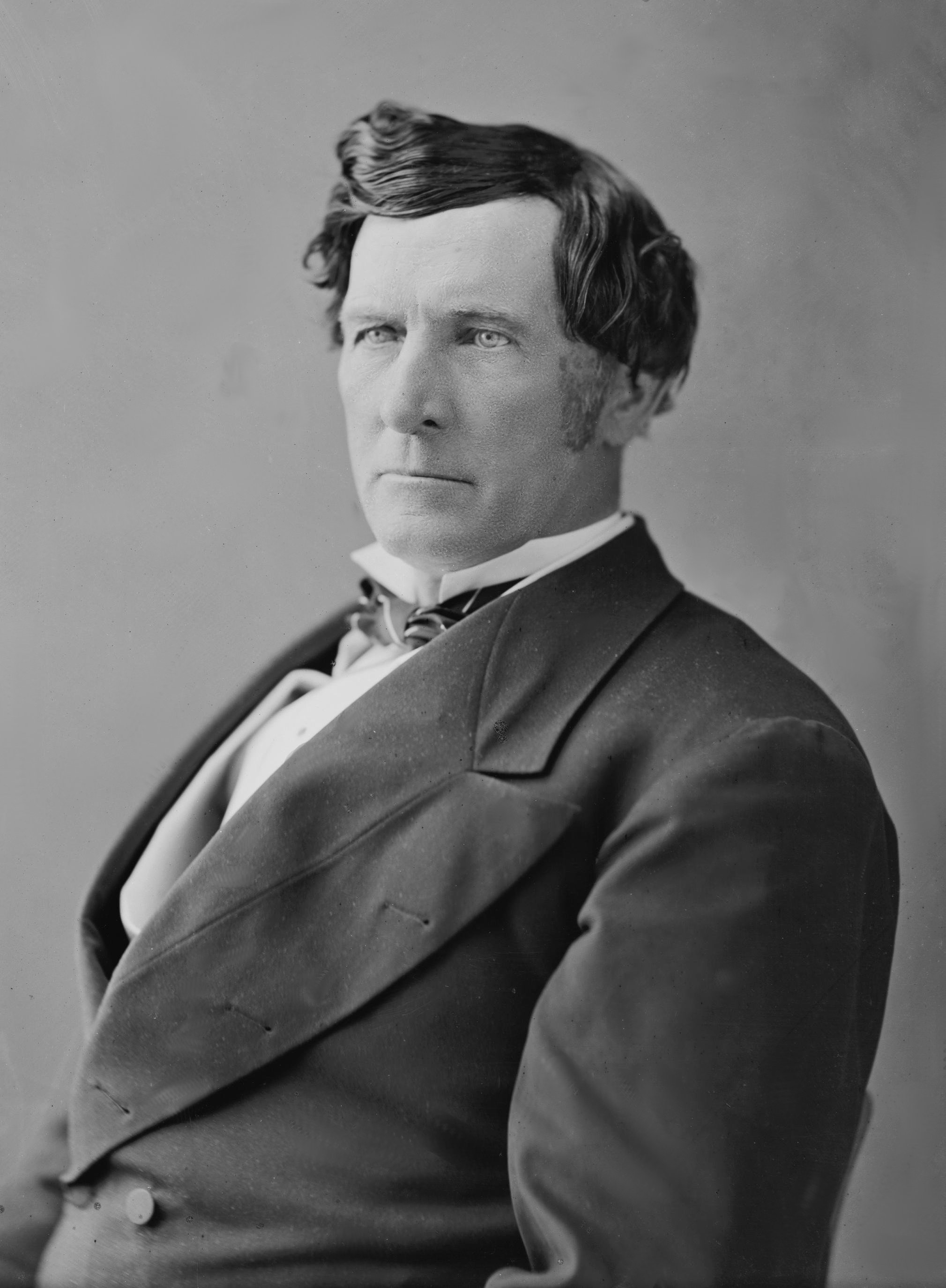
John Winfield Wallace

John Winfield Wallace (December 20, 1818 – June 24, 1889) was a Republican member of the U.S. House of Representatives from Pennsylvania.

== Biography ==
John Winfield Wallace was born near Beaver Falls, Pennsylvania. He attended Darlington Academy in Darlington, Pennsylvania, where he afterward taught. He graduated from Jefferson Medical College at Philadelphia in 1846 and commenced the practice of medicine in Darlington. He moved to New Castle, Pennsylvania, in 1850, and held several local offices.

Wallace was elected as a Republican to the Thirty-seventh Congress. He was an unsuccessful candidate for reelection in 1862.

During the Civil War, Wallace served as paymaster in the Union Army. He was again elected as a Republican to the Forty-fourth Congress. He was not a candidate for renomination in 1876.

He resumed the practice of medicine in New Castle where he died in 1889, aged 70. Interment in Grandview Cemetery, near Beaver Falls.

U.S. House of Representatives
Preceded by William Stewart	Member of the U.S. House of Representatives from Pennsylvania's 23rd congressional district 1861–1863	Succeeded by Thomas Williams
Preceded by William S. Moore	Member of the U.S. House of Representatives from Pennsylvania's 24th congressional district 1875–1877	Succeeded by William S. Shallenberger
