= Joseph P. Vigorito =

American politician (1918–2003)

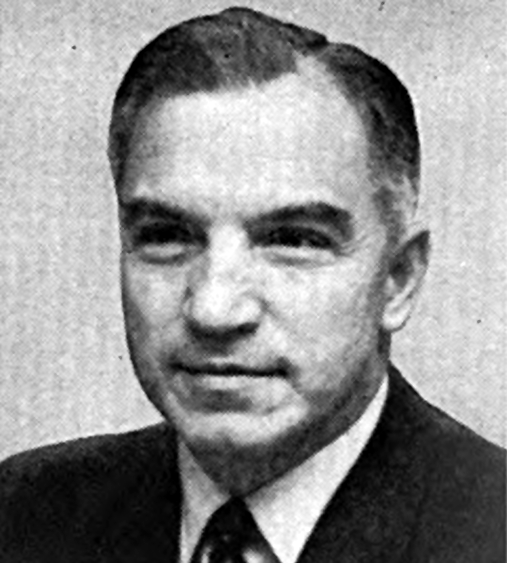

Member of the U.S. House of Representatives from Pennsylvania's 24th district
- In office January 3, 1965 – January 3, 1977
- Preceded by: James D. Weaver
- Succeeded by: Marc L. Marks

Personal details
- Born: Joseph Phillip Vigorito; November 10, 1918 Niles, Ohio
- Died: February 5, 2003 (aged 84) Washington, D.C.
- Party: Democratic

Military service
- Allegiance: United States
- Branch/service: United States Army
- Years of service: 1942–1945

Joseph Phillip Vigorito (November 10, 1918 – February 5, 2003) was a Democratic member of the U.S. House of Representatives for Pennsylvania from 1965 to 1977.

== Early life and education ==
Joe Vigorito was born in Niles, Ohio to Italian immigrants. He served in the United States Army from 1942 to 1945 and was awarded the Purple Heart.

After serving in the military, he graduated in 1947 from the Wharton School of Finance at the University of Pennsylvania in Philadelphia and received an MBA from the University of Denver in 1949. He was a member of the faculty at Penn State in State College, Pennsylvania, from 1949 to 1964.

== Congress ==
In 1964, Vigorito was elected to Congress from a district based in Erie as part of the gigantic Democratic landslide of that year. He was reelected five more times before being defeated in 1976 by Mercer County Solicitor Marc L. Marks.

During his time in office, Nina Totenberg named Vigorito one of the ten dumbest members of Congress.

== Later career and death ==
After his time in Congress, he served on the faculty of Georgetown University in Washington, D.C., from 1977 through 1978. He tried to regain his seat in 1978, but was defeated by Marks.

Vigorito was only the third Democrat to represent the Erie area in the 20th century. Since his loss, one Democrat, Kathy Dahlkemper, represented Erie County for one term from 2009 to 2011.

He died in Washington, D.C., in 2003.

== Sources ==
- United States Congress. "Joseph P. Vigorito (id: V000098)". Biographical Directory of the United States Congress.

U.S. House of Representatives
Preceded by James D. Weaver	Member of the U.S. House of Representatives from Pennsylvania's 24th congressional district 1965–1977	Succeeded by Marc L. Marks
