= Marc L. Marks =

American politician

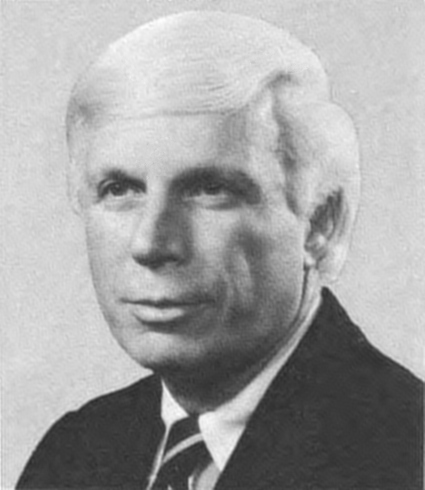

Member of the U.S. House of Representatives from Pennsylvania's 24th district
- In office January 3, 1977 – January 3, 1983
- Preceded by: Joseph P. Vigorito
- Succeeded by: District eliminated

Personal details
- Born: February 12, 1927 Farrell, Pennsylvania
- Died: February 28, 2018 (aged 91) Chevy Chase, Maryland
- Party: Republican
- Education: University of Alabama; University of Virginia

Marc Lincoln Marks (February 12, 1927 – February 28, 2018) was a former Republican member of the U.S. House of Representatives.

Marks served in the United States Army Air Corps from 1945 to 1946. He graduated from the University of Alabama in 1951, and the University of Virginia at Charlottesville, Virginia in 1954, and served as Mercer County Solicitor (district attorney) from 1960 to 1966.

In the 1976 United States House of Representatives Elections, Marks defeated the Pennsylvania six-term Democratic incumbent Joseph Vigorito with an 11% margin, one of eight Democrats unseated nationwide. He defeated Vigorito again in the 1978 election with a 26% margin, and state Representative David C. DiCarlo in 1980 by 120 votes. A serious back ailment led him to not seek re-election for a fourth term in 1982. This decision prompted a speech to the House of Representatives in March 1982, before House Speaker Tip O'Neill, in which he brought into question his own support of Reaganite policies, that, he argued, had an undue emphasis on military spending, and had caused distress to those to whom he defined as "disadvantaged". Prior to leaving Congress, John B. Connally talked to Marks and considered him as a running mate, during Connally's failed 1980 Presidential bid.

In a letter to Time Magazine he defended his position in voting for contempt proceedings against James G. Watt, Secretary of the Interior. His letter to The New York Times criticized what he saw as the Times' editorial board's irresponsibility in criticizing public officials, and apparent lack of knowledge of the plight of unemployed citizens. In 1994, Bill Clinton nominated Marks as Commissioner of the Federal Mine Safety and Health Review Commission. He died at the age of 91 in 2018.

== See also ==
- List of Jewish members of the United States Congress

U.S. House of Representatives
Preceded by Joseph P. Vigorito	Member of the U.S. House of Representatives from Pennsylvania's 24th congressional district 1977–1983	Succeeded by District eliminated
