= List of speakers of the Pennsylvania House of Representatives =

Speaker of the Pennsylvania House of Representatives
- Seal of the Pennsylvania House of Representatives

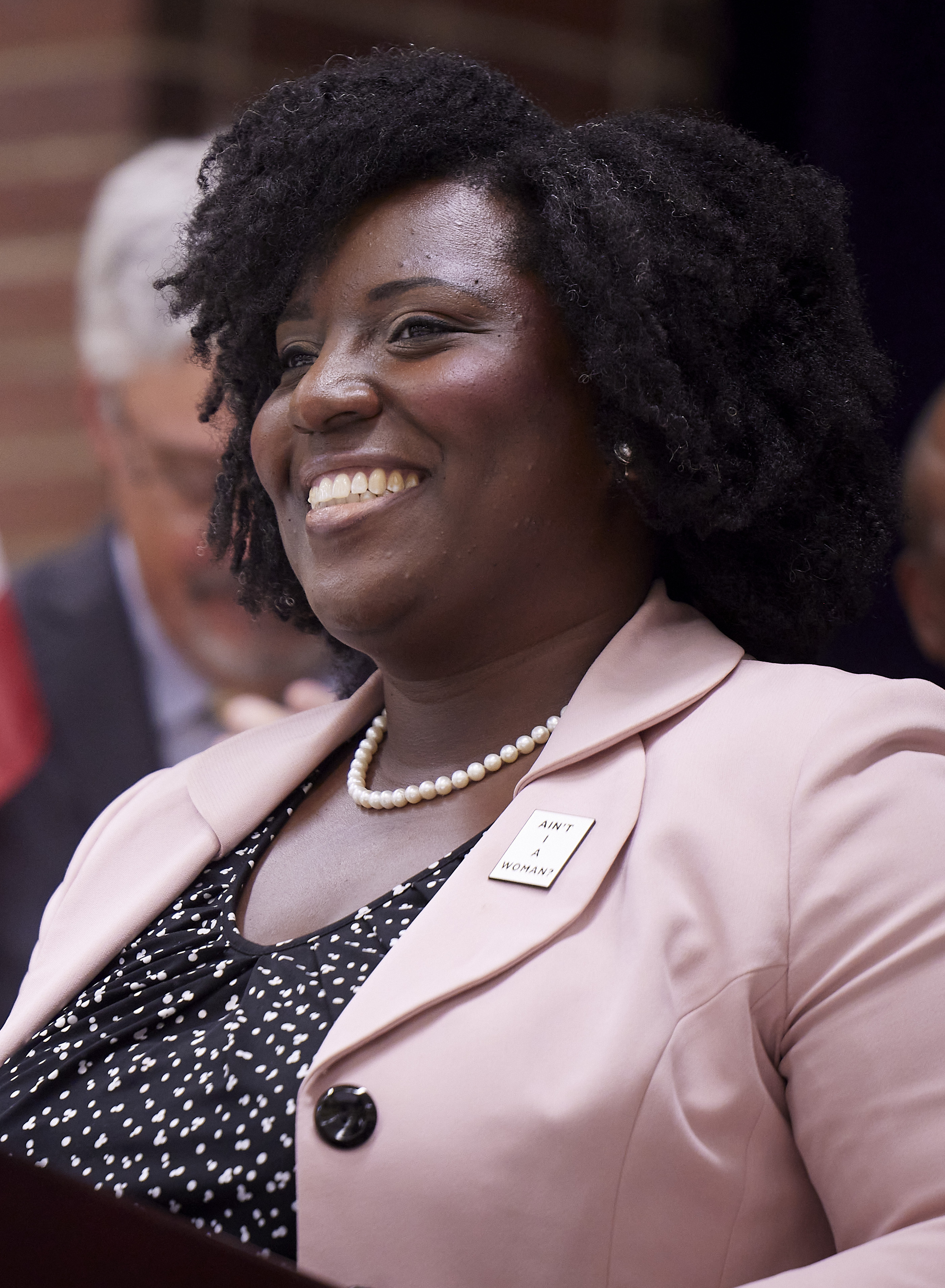
- Incumbent; Joanna McClinton since February 28, 2023
- Style: The Honorable
- Status: Presiding officer
- Seat: Pennsylvania State Capitol, Harrisburg
- Appointer: Pennsylvania House of Representatives
- Inaugural holder: William Bingham
- Formation: 1791

The speaker of the Pennsylvania House of Representatives is the presiding officer of the Pennsylvania House of Representatives.

Since 1682, over 130 House members have been elevated to the speaker's chair. The House cannot hold an official session in the absence of the speaker or their designated speaker pro tempore.

The current speaker is Joanna McClinton, who is the first female speaker.

== Speakers of the Pennsylvania Provincial Assembly ==
| Name | Elected | Notes | Citations |
|---|---|---|---|
| Thomas Wynne | 1682/1683 | | |
| Nicholas More | 1684 | | |
| John White | 1685 | | |
| unknown (probably Wynne or More) | 1687/1688 | | |
| John White | 1688 | | |
| Arthur Cook | 1689 | | |
| Joseph Growdon | 1690/1691 | | |
| unknown | 1691 | | |
| William Clark | 1692 | | |
| Joseph Growdon | 1693 | | |
| David Lloyd | 1694 | | |
| Edward Shippen | 1695 | | |
| John Simcock | 1696 | | |
| John Blunston | 1697 | | |
| Phineas Pemberton | 1698 | | |
| John Blunston | 1699 | | |
| Joseph Growdon | 1700 | | |
| David Lloyd | 1703 | | |
| Joseph Growden | 1705 | | |
| David Lloyd | 1706 | | |
| Richard Hill | 1710 | | |
| Isaac Norris | 1712 | | |
| Joseph Growdon | 1713 | | |
| David Lloyd | 1714 | | |
| Joseph Growdon | 1715 | | |
| Richard Hill | 1716 | | |
| William Trent | 1717 | | |
| Jonathan Dickinson | 1718 | | |
| William Trent | 1719 | | |
| Isaac Norris | 1720 | | |
| Jeremiah Langhorne | 1721 | | |
| Joseph Growdon | 1722 | | |
| David Lloyd | 1723 | | |
| William Biles Jr. | 1724 | | |
| David Lloyd | 1725 | | |
| Andrew Hamilton | 1729 | | |
| Jeremiah Langhorne | 1733 | | |
| Andrew Hamilton | 1734 | | |
| John Kinsey | 1739 | | |
| John Wright | 1745 | | |
| John Kinsey | 1745/1746 | | |
| Isaac Norris II | 1750 | | |
| Thomas Leech | 1758 | | |
| Isaac Norris II | 1758 | | |
| Thomas Leech | 1759 | | |
| Isaac Norris II | 1759 | | |
| Benjamin Franklin | 1764 | | |
| Isaac Norris II | 1764 | | |
| Joseph Fox | 1764 | | |
| Joseph Galloway | 1766 | | |
| Joseph Fox | 1769 | | |
| Joseph Galloway | 1769 | | |
| Edward Biddle | 1774 | | |
| John Morton | 1775 | | |

== Speakers of the Pennsylvania General Assembly ==
| Name | Elected | Notes | Citations |
|---|---|---|---|
| John Jacobs | 1776 | Under the 1776 Constitution | |
| John Bayard | 1777 | | |
| Frederick Muhlenberg | 1780 | | |
| George Gray | 1783 | | |
| John Bayard | 1784 | | |
| Thomas Mifflin | 1785 | | |
| Gerardus Wynkoop II | 1786 (four days) | | |
| Richard Peters | 1788 | | |
| William Bingham | 1790 | Under the 1790 Constitution | |

== Speakers of the Pennsylvania House of Representatives ==
| Name | Term | Party | Counties | Notes | Citations |
|---|---|---|---|---|---|
| William Bingham | 1791–1792 | Federalist | Philadelphia | | |
| Gerardus Wynkoop II | 1793 | Federalist | Philadelphia | | |
| George Latimer | 1794–1798 | Federalist | Philadelphia | | |
| Cadwalader Evans | 1799 | Federalist | Montgomery | | |
| Isaac Weaver Jr. | 1800–1803 | Democratic-Republican | Greene | | |
| Simon Snyder | 1804–1805 | Democratic-Republican | Northumberland | | |
| Charles Porter | 1805–1806 | Constitutionalist | Fayette | | |
| Simon Snyder | 1807 | Democratic-Republican | Northumberland | | |
| Nathaniel Boileau | 1808 | Democratic-Republican | Montgomery | | |
| James Engle | 1809 | Democratic-Republican | Philadelphia | | |
| John Weber | 1810 | Democratic-Republican | Montgomery | | |
| John Tod | 1812 | Democratic-Republican | Bedford | | |
| Robert Smith | 1813 | Democratic-Republican | Franklin | Resigned on February 14, 1813 | |
| John St. Clair | 1814 | Democratic-Republican | Fayette | | |
| Jacob Holgate | 1815 | Democratic-Republican | Philadelphia | | |
| Rees Hill | 1816 | Democratic-Republican | Greene | | |
| William Davidson | 1818 | Democratic | Montgomery | | |
| Rees Hill | 1819 | Democratic-Republican | Greene | | |
| Joseph Lawrence | 1820 | Democratic-Republican | Washington | | |
| John Gilmore | 1821 | Democratic-Republican | Allegheny, Butler | | |
| Joseph Lawrence | 1822 | Democratic-Republican | Washington | | |
| Joel B. Sutherland | 1825 | Democratic | Philadelphia | | |
| Joseph Ritner | 1826–1828 | Democratic-Republican | Washington | | |
| Ner Middleswarth | 1828 | Whig | Union | | |
| Frederick Smith | 1830 | Democratic-Republican | Franklin | | |
| John Laporte | 1831–1832 | Democratic | Bradford, Tioga | | |
| James Findley | 1833 | Democratic | Westmoreland | | |
| Samuel Anderson | 1833 | Democratic | Delaware | | |
| William Patterson | 1834 | Democratic | Washington | | |
| James Thompson | 1834 | Democratic | Venango, Warren | | |
| Ner Middleswarth | 1836 | Whig | Union | | |
| Lewis Dewart | 1837 | Democratic | Northumberland | | |
| William Hopkins | 1839 | Democratic | Washington | | |
| William A. Crabb | 1841 | Whig | Northumberland | | |
| James Ross Snowden | 1842 | Democratic | Venango, Clarion | | |
| Hendrick Bradley Wright | 1843 | Democratic | Luzerne, Wyoming | | |
| James Ross Snowden | 1844 | Democratic | Venango, Clarion | | |
| Findley Patterson | 1845–1846 | Democratic | Washington | | |
| James Cooper | 1847 | Whig | Adams | | |
| William F. Packer | 1848–1849 | Democratic | Lycoming, Clinton | | |
| John S. McCalmont | 1850 | Democratic | Venango | | |
| John Cessna | 1851 | Democratic | Bedford | | |
| John S. Rhey | 1852 | Democratic | Armstrong, Cambria | | |
| William P. Schell | 1853 | Democratic | Bedford | | |
| E.B. Chase | 1854 | Democratic | Susquehanna, Wyoming | | |
| Henry K. Strong | 1855 | Whig | Philadelphia | | |
| Richard L. Wright | 1856 | Democratic | Philadelphia | | |
| James Lawrence Getz | 1857 | Democratic | Berks | | |
| A.B. Longaker | 1858 | Democratic | Montgomery | | |
| William Lawrence | 1859–1860 | Republican | Dauphin | | |
| Elisha W. Davis | 1861 | Republican | Mercer, Venango | | |
| William Kinsey | 1862 | Democratic | Franklin | | |
| John Cessna | 1863 | Republican | Bedford | | |
| Henry C. Johnson | 1864 | Republican | Crawford | | |
| Arthur G. Olmsted | 1865 | Republican | Potter | | |
| James R. Kelley | 1866 | Republican | Fulton | | |
| John P. Glass | 1867 | Republican | Allegheny | | |
| Elisha W. Davis | 1868 | Republican | Philadelphia | | |
| John Clark | 1869 | Republican | Washington | | |
| Butler B. Strang | 1870 | Republican | Tioga | | |
| James H. Webb | 1871 | Republican | Bradford | | |
| William Elliott | 1872 | Republican | Philadelphia | | |
| H. H. McCormick | 1874 | Republican | Allegheny | | |
| Samuel D. Patterson | 1875 | Republican | Allegheny | | |
| E. Reed Myer | 1877 | Republican | Bradford | | |
| Henry M. Long | 1879 | Republican | Allegheny | | |
| Benjamin L. Hewit | 1881 | Republican | Blair | | |
| John E. Faunce | 1883 | Democratic | Philadelphia | | |
| James L. Graham | 1885 | Republican | Allegheny | | |
| Henry K. Boyer | 1887–1889 | Republican | Philadelphia | | |
| Caleb C. Thompson | 1891 | Republican | Warren | | |
| Henry F. Walton | 1895–1896 | Republican | Philadelphia | | |
| Henry K. Boyer | 1897 | Republican | Philadelphia | Resigned on January 17, 1898 | |
| John R. Farr | 1899 | Republican | Lackawanna | | |
| William T. Marshall | 1901 | Republican | Allegheny | | |
| Henry F. Walton | 1903–1906 | Republican | Philadelphia | | |
| Frank B. McClain | 1907–1909 | Republican | Lancaster | | |
| John F. Cox | 1909–1911 | Republican | Allegheny | Died in office on November 6, 1911 | |
| Milton W. Shreve | 1911 | Republican | Erie | | |
| George E. Alter | 1913–1914 | Republican | Allegheny | | |
| Charles A. Ambler | 1915 | Republican | Montgomery | | |
| Richard J. Baldwin | 1917–1918 | Republican | Delaware | | |
| Robert S. Spangler | 1919–1921 | Republican | York | | |
| Samuel A. Whitaker | 1921 | Republican | Chester | Elected to fill unexpired term on April 26, 1921 | |
| C.J. Goodnough | 1923 | Republican | Cameron | | |
| Thomas Bluett | 1925–1927 | Republican | Philadelphia | Resigned to become a judge | |
| James H. McClure | 1927 | Republican | Allegheny | Elected to fill an unexpired term | |
| Aaron B. Hess | 1929 | Republican | Lancaster | | |
| C.J. Goodnough | 1931 | Republican | Cameron | | |
| Grover C. Talbot | 1933–1935 | Republican | Delaware | | |
| Wilson G. Sarig | 1935–1936 | Democratic | Berks | Died in office on March 14, 1936 | |
| Roy E. Furman | 1936–1938 | Democratic | Greene | | |
| Ellwood J. Turner | 1939–1941 | Republican | Delaware | | |
| Elmer Kilroy | 1941–1942 | Democratic | Philadelphia | | |
| Ira T. Fiss | 1943–1946 | Republican | Snyder | | |
| Franklin H. Lichtenwalter | 1947–1948 | Republican | Lehigh | | |
| Herbert P. Sorg | 1949–1952 | Republican | Elk | | |
| Charles C. Smith | 1953–1955 | Republican | Philadelphia | | |
| Hiram G. Andrews | 1955–1956 | Democratic | Cambria | | |
| W. Stuart Helm | 1957–1958 | Republican | Armstrong | | |
| Hiram G. Andrews | 1959–1962 | Democratic | Cambria | | |
| W. Stuart Helm | 1963–1964 | Republican | Armstrong | | |
| Robert K. Hamilton | 1965–1966 | Democratic | Beaver | | |
| Kenneth B. Lee | 1967–1969 | Republican | Sullivan | | |
| Herbert Fineman | 1969–1970 | Democratic | Philadelphia | | |
| Kenneth B. Lee | 1971–1974 | Republican | Sullivan | | |
| Herbert Fineman | 1975–1977 | Democratic | Philadelphia | | |
| K. Leroy Irvis | 1977–1979 | Democratic | Allegheny | | |
| H. Jack Seltzer | 1979–1981 | Republican | Lebanon | | |
| Matthew J. Ryan | 1981–1983 | Republican | Delaware | | |
| K. Leroy Irvis | 1983–1988 | Democratic | Allegheny | | |
| James J. Manderino | 1989 | Democratic | Westmoreland | Died in office on December 26, 1989 | |
| Bob O'Donnell | 1990–1993 | Democratic | Philadelphia | | |
| Bill DeWeese | 1993–1994 | Democratic | Greene | | |
| Matthew J. Ryan | 1995–2003 | Republican | Delaware | Died in office on March 29, 2003 | |
| John Perzel | 2003–2006 | Republican | Philadelphia | Elected to fill unexpired term on April 15, 2003 | |
| Dennis M. O'Brien | 2007–2008 | Republican | Philadelphia | Minority-party speaker | |
| Keith R. McCall | 2009–2010 | Democratic | Carbon | | |
| Sam Smith | 2011–2014 | Republican | Jefferson | | |
| Mike Turzai | 2015–2020 | Republican | Allegheny | Resigned on June 15, 2020 | |
| Bryan Cutler | 2020–2023 | Republican | Lancaster | | |
| Mark Rozzi | 2023 | Democratic | Berks | Resigned on February 28, 2023 | |
| Joanna McClinton | 2023– | Democratic | Philadelphia | | |

== See also ==
- List of Pennsylvania state legislatures
