= Nathaniel Boileau =

American politician (1763–1850)

6th Speaker of the Pennsylvania House of Representatives
- In office 1808–1809
- Preceded by: Simon Snyder
- Succeeded by: James Engle

Personal details
- Born: 1763
- Died: March 16, 1850 (aged 86–87)
- Party: Democratic-Republican

Nathaniel Boileau (1763 – March 16, 1850) was an American politician. He was a member of the Pennsylvania House of Representatives from 1797 to 1809 and served as speaker in 1808.

== Education ==
Boileau attended Princeton University and was a junior in 1788.

== Political activities ==
Boileau was elected to the Pennsylvania House of Representatives in 1800 and 1801 from Montgomery County.

Before 1806, he had attempted to run for the U.S. House of Representatives and as Pennsylvania Secretary of State.

Boileau temporarily replaced John M. Hyneman as adjutant-general for the state of Pennsylvania, after the resignation of Hyneman. He also served as aide de camp to the Governor of Pennsylvania.

In 1817, he was Secretary of the Commonwealth of Pennsylvania (Secretary of State for Pennsylvania).

He was considered as a possible gubernatorial nominee for the Democratic Republican party in 1820.

== Other activities ==
Robert Loller in his will that Boileau build the Loller Academy at a cost of $11,000.00.

== See also ==
- Speaker of the Pennsylvania House of Representatives
