= W. Stuart Helm =

American politician

76th Speaker of the Pennsylvania House of Representatives

Member of the Pennsylvania House of Representatives
- In office January 1, 1963 – March 2, 1986
- Preceded by: Hiram Andrews
- Succeeded by: Robert Hamilton

Member of the Pennsylvania House of Representatives
- In office January 1, 1957 – March 2, 1986
- Preceded by: Hiram Andrews
- Succeeded by: Hiram Andrews

Member of the Pennsylvania House of Representatives from the Armstrong County district
- In office January 7, 1941 – November 30, 1964

Personal details
- Born: April 8, 1908 Cowansville, Armstrong County, Pennsylvania
- Died: March 2, 1986 (aged 77) Waverly, Ohio
- Party: Republican

W. Stuart Helm (April 8, 1908 – March 2, 1986) was an American politician who was Speaker of the Pennsylvania House of Representatives. He attended Kittanning High School, Pennsylvania State College, and Duquesne University. He was employed by the Sun Oil Company and served on the Kittanning Borough School Board from 1937 to 1942.

Helm was elected to the Pennsylvania House of Representatives in 1940 and served through 1964.. He served from Speaker from 1957-1958 and again from 1963-1964. Helm served as Secretary of the Commonwealth from 1965 until 1967 under Governor William Scranton.

Party political offices
Preceded by Robert F. Kent	Republican nominee for Auditor General of Pennsylvania; 1964	Succeeded by Warner Depuy
