= Thomas Bluett (politician) =

American politician (1879–1958)

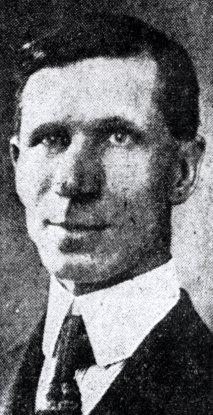

Speaker of the Pennsylvania House of Representatives
- In office 1925–1927
- Preceded by: C. J. Goodnough
- Succeeded by: James H. McClure

Personal details
- Born: October 7, 1879 Birmingham, England
- Died: March 4, 1958 (aged 78) Philadelphia, Pennsylvania
- Party: Republican
- Education: Temple University School of Law
- Profession: Lawyer

Thomas Bluett (October 7, 1879 – March 4, 1958) was a native of Birmingham, England who became Speaker of the Pennsylvania House of Representatives, serving in that capacity from 1925 to 1927.

== Formative years ==
Born in Birmingham, England on October 7, 1879, Bluett attended Bayard Taylor and Thomas Potter public schools. A student at Temple University in Philadelphia, Pennsylvania, he graduated from that university's law department in 1904, and was then admitted to the Philadelphia Bar on March 6, 1905, subsequently finding work in a local law office. On June 5, 1905, Bluett married Phoebe Edel on June 5, 1905; they had four children: William E., Jane C., Thomas T., and Robert S.

== Public service and political career ==
In 1917, Bluett became the assistant solicitor for the city of Philadelphia. Elected to the Philadelphia Common Council in 1918, he served with that body into 1919. Elected as a Republican in November 1920 to represent the 25th District of Philadelphia for the 1921-1922 legislative session of the Pennsylvania House of Representatives, he then served three more consecutive terms (until 1927). During this tenure, he was also elected by his colleagues to serve as Speaker of the Pennsylvania House in 1925, and continued in that capacity until 1927.

That year, he resigned from the House upon being elected a Philadelphia Municipal Court Judge. After serving a ten-year term, which began on January 1, 1928, he was re-elected to that position in 1937. Elected in 1941 as a judge of the Common Pleas Court No. 4 of Philadelphia County for a 10-year term, he fulfilled his obligations and then returned to private practice in 1952.

=== Accomplishments ===
During his tenure with the Pennsylvania House, Bluett became the primary sponsor of a significant number of real estate and tax law-related legislation, including the Personal Property Taxes, First and Second Class Cities Act in 1923 (Act 421).

== Later life ==
Preceded in death by his first wife, Bluett married Eva Roach in 1932; they had one daughter, Mary E.

== Death and interment ==
Bluett died in Philadelphia on March 4, 1958, and was interred at the Forest Hills Memorial Park in Huntingdon Valley, Pennsylvania.
