= John Weber (Pennsylvania politician) =

American politician

8th [[Speaker of the Pennsylvania House of Representatives]]
- In office 1810 – August 24, 1815
- Preceded by: James Engle
- Succeeded by: John Tod

Personal details
- Born: October 8, 1768 Montgomery County, Pennsylvania, British America
- Died: August 24, 1815 (aged 46) Gwynedd, Pennsylvania, USA
- Party: Democratic
- Spouse: Elizabeth Reiff
- Profession: miller

John Weber (1768–1815) was an American politician who served as the speaker of the Pennsylvania House of Representatives in 1810.

John Weber was elected to the Pennsylvania House of Representatives from Montgomery County in 1806 and served through 1811.

== See also ==
- List of speakers of the Pennsylvania House of Representatives
