= James R. Kelley (Pennsylvania state representative) =

American politician

45th Speaker of the Pennsylvania House of Representatives
- In office 1866–1871
- Preceded by: Arthur G. Olmstead
- Succeeded by: John P. Glass

Personal details
- Born: March 1, 1839 Ireland
- Died: August 9, 1871 (aged 32)
- Party: Republican
- Spouse: Jane Hunter

James Robinson Kelley (March 1, 1839, Ireland–August 9, 1871) was a Speaker of the Pennsylvania House of Representatives in 1866. Kelley was elected to the Pennsylvania House of Representatives in 1864 and served through 1866.

== Speaker ==
During his term as Speaker, the Pennsylvania legislature commissioned the painting The Battle of Gettysburg, by Peter Frederick Rothermel, commemorating the Civil War battle. The painting cost $25,000 (equivalent to $549,716 in 2025), and is displayed at the State Museum of Pennsylvania.

== Biography ==
Short biography from his 1871 obituary in The Pittsburgh Commercial: James R. Kelley was born in Ireland about the year 1839; came with his parents in his childhood to the United States, where they found an abiding place in Washington county. When the war broke out Mr. Kelley, who was then a student at Ohio college, entered an Ohio regiment, and served in it until he was wounded in a duel of pickets near Corinth, and was discharged for disability. Returning to his home, he was adopted by the Republicans of his county, in 1863, as one of their candidates for Assembly, and their ticket was completely triumphant. He was re-elected in 1864 and 1865, from the district composed of Washington and Beaver, and was unanimously elected Speaker by the House of Representatives of 1866. Retiring from the Legislature in that year he purchased the half of the Washington Reporter, and has remained in the chair editorial ever since, participating actively in the politics of the county and of the state. He was a delegate to the State Conventions of 1869 and 1871, and was the temporary presiding officer of the latter body. His disease was typhoid pneumonia, which ran its course to a fatal termination in three weeks from the first attack. He was a fine writer, thoroughly read up on the history, literature and poetry of the day, a fluent and sometimes eloquent speaker, and a capable and honest legislator, earnest and faithful in his attachments, bitter in his animosities, and almost too generous and impulsive for his own interest. Naturally he had with many friends, some enemies, but they were few.

== See also ==
- Speaker of the Pennsylvania House of Representatives
