= James Engle =

American politician

7th Speaker of the Pennsylvania House of Representatives
- In office 1809 – January 5, 1821
- Preceded by: Nathaniel Boileau
- Succeeded by: John Weber

Personal details
- Born: 1757 Germantown, Pennsylvania, U.S.
- Died: January 5, 1821 (aged 63–64) Philadelphia, Pennsylvania, U.S.
- Party: Democratic-Republican

James Engle (1757 – January 5, 1821) fought in the American Revolutionary War, was a member of the Pennsylvania House of Representatives from Philadelphia County and served as speaker in 1809.

== Early life ==
Engle was born in Germantown, Pennsylvania.

== Military service ==
Engle enlisted at age 19, (other sources list 18) was a sergeant, ensign (commissioned September 20, 1776), and second lieutenant (promoted 1777) in the Third Regiment Pennsylvania Line. He enlisted in Captain Samuel Watson's company. Engle served in the following locations/battles:

- Canadian campaign
- Ticonderoga
- Germantown
- Valley Forge

== Political activities ==
Engle was a member of the Democratic Republican party.

He was elected to the Pennsylvania House of Representatives in 1801. (Other Democratic Republicans elected along with him from Philadelphia County included Jacob Holgate, William Penrose, Elijah Gordon, John Goodman, and George Ingles.) There were no opposition candidates from the Federalist Party.

In 1808, he received 4,374 votes for his seat in the House.

On December 21, 1808, Engle was elected Speaker of the Pennsylvania House of Representatives.

== Personal life ==
Engle married Margaret Marshall on May 4, 1785.

== Other activities ==
Engle was a member of the Guardians of the Poor.

== Death ==
Engle died in Philadelphia.

== Descendants ==
- Daughter: Sarah Engle, Philadelphia. Married to Robert Patterson.
- Grandson: Robert Emmet Patterson, Philadelphia. Elected to membership in the Sons of the American Revolution: December 11, 1893.
- Great-Granddaughter: Susan Engle Negus, Philadelphia

== See also ==
- Speaker of the Pennsylvania House of Representatives
