= William Caldwell Anderson Lawrence =

American politician

William Caldwell Anderson Lawrence was a lawyer and state legislator in Pennsylvania. He was Speaker of the Pennsylvania House of Representatives from 1859 to 1860. He was a Pennsylvania State Representative from 1857 to 1860. He graduated from Washington College in Washington, Pennsylvania (now Washington & Jefferson College) in 1852. He died in 1860.
