= Ira T. Fiss =

Pennsylvania politician

121st Speaker of the Pennsylvania House of Representatives

Member of the Pennsylvania House of Representatives

Member of the Pennsylvania House of Representatives
- In office 1943–1946
- Preceded by: Elmer Kilroy
- Succeeded by: Franklin H. Lichtenwalter

Personal details
- Born: November 7, 1888 Shamokin Dam, Snyder County, Pennsylvania, U.S.
- Died: June 18, 1955 (aged 66) Mahoning Township, Montour County, Pennsylvania, U.S.
- Party: Republican

Ira T. Fiss (November 7, 1888 – June 18, 1955) is a former Speaker of the Pennsylvania House of Representatives.

Fiss was elected to the Pennsylvania House of Representatives in 1937 and served through 1948 .

Fiss was from Shamokin Dam, Snyder County, Pennsylvania.

== See also ==
- List of Pennsylvania state legislatures
