= William McCreery (Pennsylvania politician) =

American politician

William McCreery (May 17, 1786 – September 27, 1841) was a Jacksonian member of the U.S. House of Representatives from Pennsylvania.

William McCreery was born in Omagh, County Tyrone, Ireland. He immigrated to the United States in 1791 with his parents, who settled near Fairfield, Pennsylvania. He moved to Paris, Pennsylvania, in 1812 and engaged in agricultural pursuits. He was a member of the Pennsylvania House of Representatives from 1824 to 1827. He was a constructor of the Pennsylvania State Canal and of the Pennsylvania State Highway from 1826 to 1831.

In 1828, McCreery defeated incumbent Joseph Lawrence, in a near-Democratic sweep of Pennsylvania's congressional delegation. McCreery was elected as a Jacksonian to the Twenty-first Congress. He was an unsuccessful candidate for reelection in 1830 to the Twenty-second Congress.

He served as collector of internal revenue at Pittsburgh, Pennsylvania, from 1831 to 1833, and was again a member of the Pennsylvania House of Representatives from 1833 to 1836. He served as superintendent of the Pennsylvania State Canal in 1835, residing in Allegheny City, Pennsylvania. He was the acting president of the Pennsylvania Board of Canal Appraisers at the time of his death in Fairfield in 1841. His remains were interred in Up-the-Valley United Presbyterian Church Cemetery.

== Sources ==
- United States Congress. "William McCreery (id: M000386)". Biographical Directory of the United States Congress.
- The Political Graveyard

U.S. House of Representatives
Preceded by Joseph Lawrence	Member of the U.S. House of Representatives from Pennsylvania's 15th congressional district 1829–1831	Succeeded by Thomas M. T. McKennan
