= Charles Porter (Pennsylvania politician) =

American politician

5th Speaker of the Pennsylvania House of Representatives
- In office December 5, 1805 – 1806
- Preceded by: Simon Snyder
- Succeeded by: Simon Snyder

Personal details
- Born: late 17th century unknown
- Died: 18th century, after 1841 unknown
- Party: Constitutionalist
- Spouse: Rachel
- Profession: lawyer, county judge

Charles Porter (1756–1830) was Speaker of the Pennsylvania House of Representatives in 1805–1806.

Charles Porter was elected to the Pennsylvania House of Representatives from Fayette County in 1800 and served through 1807. He served as an associate judge in Fayette County from 1821–1841.

== See also ==
- Speaker of the Pennsylvania House of Representatives
