= Thomas Patterson (Pennsylvania politician) =

American politician

Thomas Patterson (October 1, 1764 – November 16, 1841) was a member of the U.S. House of Representatives from Pennsylvania.

Thomas Patterson (half brother of John Patterson) was born in Little Britain Township, Pennsylvania. He moved with his parents to Pattersons Mills, Pennsylvania, in 1778. He engaged in agricultural pursuits and operated a flour mill. He served as a major general of militia in the War of 1812.

Patterson was elected as a Republican to the Fifteenth Congress and the two succeeding Congresses and reelected as a Jackson Republican to the Eighteenth Congress. He did not seek renomination in 1824. He resumed former business pursuits and died in Cross Creek Township, Pennsylvania, in 1841. Interment in West Middletown Cemetery in West Middletown, Pennsylvania.

== Sources ==
- United States Congress. "Thomas Patterson (id: P000128)". Biographical Directory of the United States Congress.
- The Political Graveyard

U.S. House of Representatives
Preceded by Aaron Lyle	Member of the U.S. House of Representatives from Pennsylvania's 12th congressional district 1817–1823	Succeeded by John Brown
Preceded by Patrick Farrelly	Member of the U.S. House of Representatives from Pennsylvania's 15th congressional district 1823–1825	Succeeded by Joseph Lawrence
