= Eugene B. Beaumont =

Eugene Beauharnais Beaumont
- Born: August 2, 1837; Wilkes-Barre, Luzerne County, Pennsylvania, US
- Died: August 17, 1916 (aged 79); Harveys Lake, Pennsylvania, US
- Burial place: Hollenback Cemetery, Wilkes-Barre, Pennsylvania
- Military career
- Allegiance: United States; Union
- Branch: US Army; Union Army
- Service years: 1861 – 1892
- Rank: Lieutenant Colonel USA; Brevet Colonel USV
- Unit: 4th U.S. Cavalry Regiment
- Conflicts: American Civil War; Red River War
- Awards: Medal of Honor

Eugene Beauharnais Beaumont (August 2, 1837 – August 17, 1916) was a Union Army officer in the American Civil War and a recipient of the Medal of Honor for his actions at an engagement on the Harpeth River in Tennessee and at the Battle of Selma. After the Civil War he served in the Indian Wars of the western United States.

== Early life ==
Beaumont was born in Wilkes-Barre, Luzerne County, Pennsylvania, the son of U.S. Representative Andrew Beaumont. He was appointed to the United States Military Academy from the city of Wilkes-Barre in 1856 and graduated on May 6, 1861. Ranking 32nd out of his class of 45 cadets, Beaumont was assigned as a second lieutenant to the 1st Cavalry Regiment. Soon after entering the Army he married Margaret Rutter, his childhood sweetheart.

== Civil War service ==
He trained soldiers in Washington, D.C., until June 1861, when he was appointed aide-de-camp to General Ambrose Burnside. With Burnside, he participated in the First Battle of Bull Run. In September he became aide-de-camp to General John Sedgwick and served with him in the Peninsula Campaign of early 1862 until falling ill with typhoid fever. After recuperating, he returned to duty in August 1862 and again worked as an aide-de-camp, this time to General-in-Chief of the Union Army, Henry Wager Halleck. Beaumont requested to be sent back to the field, and in May 1863 he rejoined General Sedgwick as a captain. He served with Sedgwick for just over a year and took part in a series of battles, including Gettysburg, Rappahannock Station, Raccoon Ford, Mine Run, and the Wilderness.

By December 17, 1864, he was a major serving as the Assistant Adjutant General of the Army of the Mississippi's Cavalry Corps. On that day, at the Harpeth River in Tennessee, he took command of the 4th Cavalry Regiment and led a successful mission to capture a Confederate artillery battery. At the Battle of Selma, Alabama, four months later, on April 2, 1865, he led the regiment in an assault on Confederate fortifications. For these actions, he was awarded the Medal of Honor several decades after the end of the war, on March 30, 1898.

== Medal of Honor citation ==
Beaumont's official Medal of Honor citation reads:

Obtained permission from the corps commander to advance upon the enemy's position with the 4th U.S. Cavalry, of which he was a lieutenant; led an attack upon a battery, dispersed the enemy, and captured the guns. At Selma, Ala., charged, at the head of his regiment, into the second and last line of the enemy's works.

== Indian Wars service ==
After the Civil War, Beaumont served with the 4th Cavalry throughout the western United States. One of his first assignments was as commander of the District of Lampasas, Texas, in 1869 and 1870. During the Red River War, he fought with Colonel Ranald S. Mackenzie in the Battle of Palo Duro Canyon, where he led the 4th Cavalry's leading battalion. He spent four years as a cavalry instructor at West Point, from 1875 to 1879, before being promoted to major and returning west. He commanded Fort Reno, in the Indian Territory, for a year, then participated in a campaign against the Ute tribe while stationed at Fort Garland, Colorado. He commanded Fort Riley, Kansas, in 1881, Fort Bowie, Arizona Territory), beginning in 1884, and Fort Huachuca in 1888.

Beaumont's wife Margaret died in 1879 and he remarried, to Maria Orton, in 1883. His oldest daughter from his first marriage, Natalie Sedgewick Beaumont, married George Alexander Forsyth, a fellow 4th Cavalry officer who was only three or four months his junior. Beaumont's other daughter, also from his first marriage, Hortense Darling Beaumont, married Charles Pinckney Elliott.

He retired on May 6, 1892, as a lieutenant colonel. Beaumont died in the early morning of August 17, 1916, at age 79, in Harveys Lake, Pennsylvania.

== See also ==
- List of Medal of Honor recipients
