= David Petrikin =

American politician

David Petrikin (December 1, 1788 – March 1, 1847) was a Democratic member of the U.S. House of Representatives from Pennsylvania.

David Petrikin was born in Bellefonte, Pennsylvania. He studied medicine and was admitted to practice. He moved to Danville, Pennsylvania, and engaged in the practice of medicine. During the War of 1812, he served as a surgeon with the Second Regiment of the Pennsylvania Riflemen. After the war returned to Danville and continued the practice of medicine. He also erected and operated a woolen mill. He was elected prothonotary of Columbia County, Pennsylvania, on March 15, 1821. He was a member of the Pennsylvania House of Representatives. He served as postmaster of Danville from February 1, 1834, to March 21, 1837.

Petrikin was elected as a Democrat to the Twenty-fifth and Twenty-sixth Congresses. He served as the chairman of the United States House Committee on Public Buildings and Grounds during the Twenty-sixth Congress. He died in Catawissa, Pennsylvania, in 1847. Interment in Petrikin Cemetery in Danville, which was later converted into a memorial park.

== Sources ==
- United States Congress. "David Petrikin (id: P000267)". Biographical Directory of the United States Congress.
- The Political Graveyard

U.S. House of Representatives
Preceded by Andrew Beaumont	Member of the U.S. House of Representatives from Pennsylvania's 15th congressional district 1837–1841	Succeeded by Benjamin A. Bidlack
