= Andrew Beaumont =

American politician (1790–1853)

Member of the U.S. House of Representatives from Pennsylvania's 15th district
- In office March 4, 1833 – March 3, 1837
- Preceded by: Thomas M. T. McKennan
- Succeeded by: David Petrikin

Pennsylvania House of Representatives
- In office 1821-1822; 1826; 1849

Personal details
- Born: January 24, 1790 Lebanon, Connecticut
- Died: September 30, 1853 (aged 63)
- Party: Jacksonian

Andrew Beaumont (January 24, 1790 – September 30, 1853) was a member of the U.S. House of Representatives from Pennsylvania.

Beaumont was born in Lebanon, Connecticut, the son of Isaiah and Fear (Alden) Beaumont. He moved to Pennsylvania in 1808 and studied law but never practiced. He served as Collector of Revenue from 1814 to 1816, and prothonotary and Clerk of the Courts of Luzerne County, Pennsylvania, from 1816 to 1819. He was a member of the Pennsylvania House of Representatives in 1821, 1822, and 1826. He served as postmaster of Wilkes-Barre from 1826 to 1832.

Beaumont was elected as a Jacksonian to the Twenty-third and Twenty-fourth U.S. Congresses. He was appointed Commissioner of Public Buildings in Washington, D.C. by President James K. Polk, and but served only from November 5, 1846, to March 3, 1847, because the Senate refused to confirm his appointment. He was again a member of the Pennsylvania House of Representatives in 1849. He died in Wilkes-Barre in 1853 and was buried in Hollenback Cemetery.

Beaumont married Julia A. Colt in 1813. They had ten children: six daughters and four sons. Two of his sons were Rear Admiral John Colt Beaumont, US Navy, and Lieutenant Colonel Eugene B. Beaumont, US Army (Medal of Honor Recipient, Civil War). His grandson was Brigadier General John Colt Beaumont, US Marine Corps, and his cousin was Major William Beaumont, Surgeon, US Army (William Beaumont Army Medical Center, El Paso, TX).

== Sources ==
- United States Congress. "Andrew Beaumont (id: B000286)". Biographical Directory of the United States Congress.
- The Political Graveyard

U.S. House of Representatives
Preceded by Thomas M. T. McKennan	Member of the U.S. House of Representatives from Pennsylvania's 15th congressional district 1833–1837	Succeeded by David Petrikin
