= Cromwell Pearce =

American colonel & judge (1772–1852)

Cromwell Pearce (August 13, 1772 – April 2, 1852) was a colonel in the U.S. army during the War of 1812, served as sheriff of Chester County, Pennsylvania, and later as an associate judge in the county. He lived in West Chester.

== Early life ==
Pearce was born in a farm in Willistown where the Paoli Massacre took place in 1777. He had a limited childhood education due to the Revolutionary War.

== Personal life ==
Pearce married Isabella Bull on April 23, 1801. They lived in Philadelphia for a short time where their son Lewis Gronow Pearce was born. In 1802, the family moved to West Chester and Pearce became postmaster on September 25, 1802.

On March 30, 1807, Isabella Pearce died.

On April 13, 1821, he married Mary Bartholomew.

== Military service ==
President John Adams appointed Pearce first lieutenant of the 10th Regiment United States Light Infantry on April 17, 1799.

Pearce became lieutenant-colonel of the 85th regiment state militia on August 18, 1806.

Pearce was appointed by President James Madison and the United States Senate as a colonel of infantry on July 23, 1812. He commanded the 16th Regiment. In the Pennsylvania militia, Pearce had been replaced by James Steele.

Cromwell Pearce (along with Thomas Sargeant of Harrisburg, Rees Hill of Greene County, and Samuel McKean of Bradford County) was appointed as an aide de camp to the commander in chief of the Commonwealth of Pennsylvania.

== Political activity ==
Pearce was a member of the Democratic Republican party. He held a number of party meetings, open to the public, at his home.

Pearce became a Presidential elector in 1824.

== Sheriff of Chester County ==
Pearce was elected sheriff in 1816 and served for one term.

== Associate Judge of Chester County ==
Governor John Andrew Schulze appointed Pearce as an associate judge in the county court on September 5, 1825. He remained in that position until 1839. He resigned due to a hearing problem.

== Miscellaneous notes ==
On January 8, 1805, a petition from Pearce was presented to the United States House of Representatives for a claim of 2,000 acres (8.1 km^{2}) of unappropriated land due to service of his father as an officer in the French and Indian War. This was based on a proclamation signed by the King of England in 1763. On January 24, 1805, the petition was declined.
