= Rees Hill =

American politician (1776–1852)

member of the Pennsylvania Senate for the 20th district
- In office 1823–1824

member of the Pennsylvania Senate for the 18th district
- In office 1821–1822
- Preceded by: Isaac Weaver Jr.
- Succeeded by: Jacob M. Wise

18th Speaker of the Pennsylvania House of Representatives
- In office 1819–1819
- Preceded by: William Davidson
- Succeeded by: Joseph Lawrence

16th Speaker of the Pennsylvania House of Representatives
- In office 1816–1816
- Preceded by: Jacob Holgate
- Succeeded by: William Davidson

member of the Pennsylvania House of Representatives for Greene County
- In office 1814-1820; 1810-1813

Personal details
- Born: August 15, 1776 Frederick County, Virginia
- Died: November 24, 1852 (aged 76) near Winchester, Virginia
- Party: Democratic Republican
- Spouse: Nancy Heaton

Rees Hill (August 15, 1776 – November 24, 1852) was a U.S. army colonel in the War of 1812 and a politician who served as a Republican and Democratic-Republican member of the Pennsylvania House of Representatives for Greene County from 1810 to 1813 and from 1814 to 1820, including as Speaker of the Pennsylvania House of Representatives in 1816 and 1819. He also served as a Democratic member of the Pennsylvania State Senate for the 18th district from 1821 to 1822 and the 20th district from 1823 to 1824.

== Early life ==
Hill was born in Frederick County, Virginia to Robert and Priscilla (Bowen) Hill. He conducted most of his business in Pennsylvania, became a successful merchant in Waynesburg, Pennsylvania and married Nancy Heaton.

== Military service ==
He served as a colonel during the War of 1812 leading the 147th Regiment of the Pennsylvania Militia. His regiment was originally stationed in Erie, Pennsylvania to guard a naval facility. On July 30, 1813, his detachment received orders to join the northwestern army and served in Ohio and Michigan. He was commended by then-general (and future president) William Henry Harrison in a letter to President James Madison.

Rees Hill (along with Thomas Sargeant of Harrisburg, Cromwell Pearce of Chester County, and Samuel McKean of Bradford County) was appointed as an aide de camp to Governor William Findlay, the commander in chief of the commonwealth of Pennsylvania.

On March 3, 1819, Congress and President James Monroe approved an act to reimburse Hill for money he had spent for expenses of his troops during the War of 1812.

== Political career ==
Hill was a member of the Democratic Republican party.

Hill was Speaker of the Pennsylvania House of Representatives in two non-consecutive years (1816 and 1819). His first election as speaker took place on December 5, 1815. He was elected as speaker a second time on December 10, 1816. On December 1, 1818, he again won election as speaker with 74 votes (other votes were: John Purdon – 9, Samuel Bond – 1, Phineas Jenks – 1, and William N. Irvine – 1). On December 7, 1819 (for the session beginning in December, 1819 and lasting through most of 1820), he came in third in a vote for speaker with 14 of the 93 votes cast. (The speaker elected was Joseph Lawrence with 56 votes. Other votes were: Phineas Jenks – 21, Wilson Smith – 1, and William Lehman – 1).

He served as chairman of the Committee of Ways and Means in the Pennsylvania House in 1820. He was elected to the Pennsylvania Senate for the 18th district in November, 1820 and served from 1821 to 1822. He also represented the 20th district from 1823 to 1824.

After his political career ended, Hill returned to Virginia and managed the estates of his father and Uncles. He died on November 24, 1852, in Frederick County, Virginia and was interred in Winchester, Virginia.

== See also ==
- List of speakers of the Pennsylvania House of Representatives
