= St. Paul's Church (Chester, Pennsylvania) =

Historic Episcopal church

Coordinates: 39.8533°N 75.3583°W

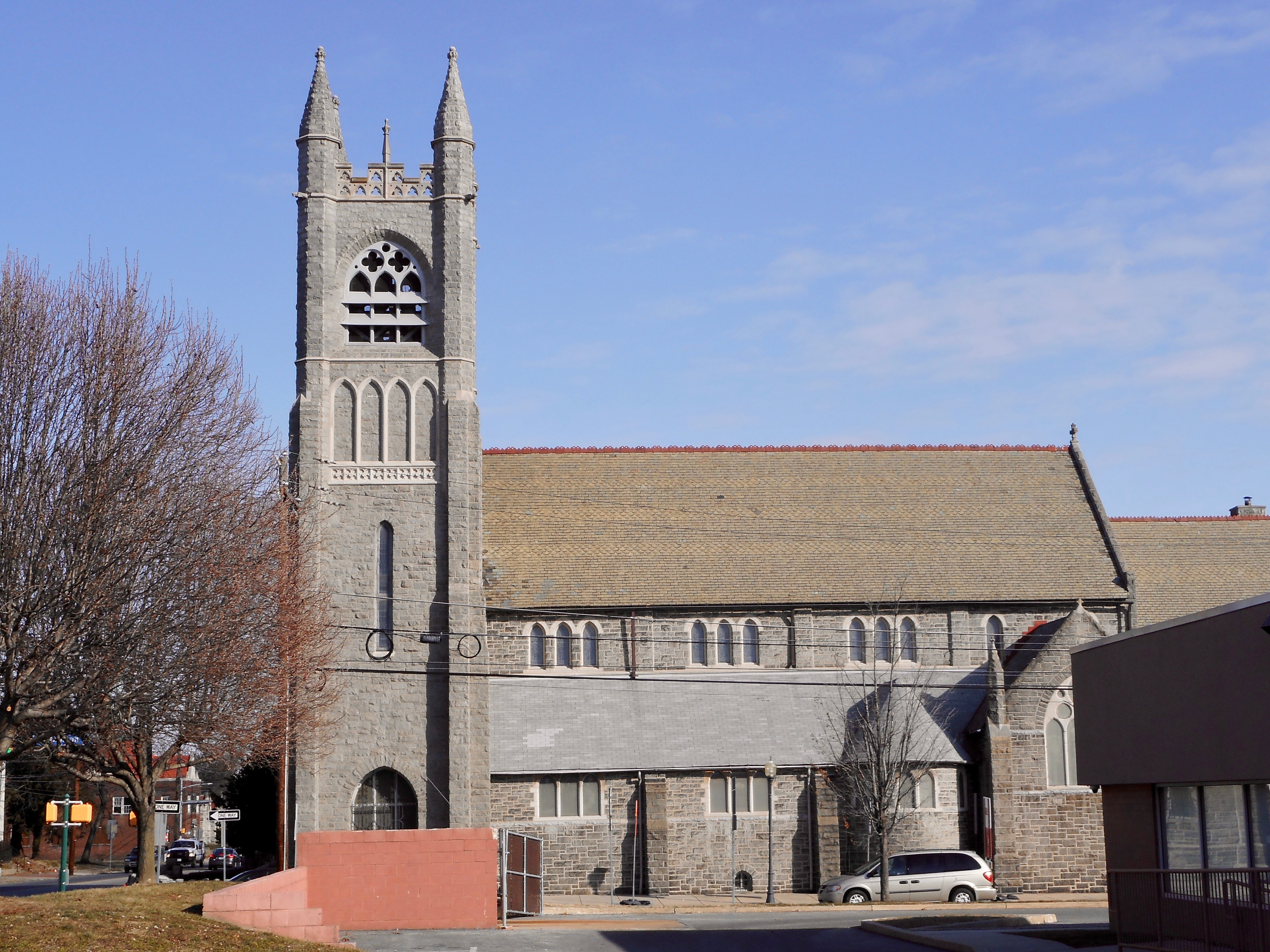
St. Paul's Church (Chester, Pennsylvania) on 9th and Madison Street, built in 1900

St. Paul's Church is an Episcopal church founded in 1702 in Chester, Pennsylvania. The church is a part of the Episcopal Diocese of Pennsylvania. It is located at 301 East 9th Street and is an active worship center. The church reported 78 members in 2015 and 32 members in 2023; no membership statistics were reported in 2024 parochial reports. Plate and pledge income reported for the congregation in 2024 was $33,781. Average Sunday attendance (ASA) in 2024 was 17 persons.

== History ==
England, The Netherlands and Sweden each claimed the territory flanking the Delaware River. Swedish colonists established a permanent settlement at Upland, New Sweden (now Chester, Pennsylvania), by 1644.

Dutch soldiers, under the command of Director-General Peter Stuyvesant, arrived in a squadron of ships in 1655, and seized the Swedish colony. It was renamed New Netherlands, although Swedish and Finnish settlers were allowed to remain.

The English seized New Netherlands in 1664, at the beginning of the Second Anglo-Dutch War. The Dutch formally ceded the colony to England a decade later, in the 1674 Treaty of Westminster.

The Swedes had set aside a plot of land on the south side of 3rd Street, east of Market Street, as a burial ground. It is believed that they never erected a church building, but held religious services in a nearby blockhouse.

=== Old St. Paul's Church ===
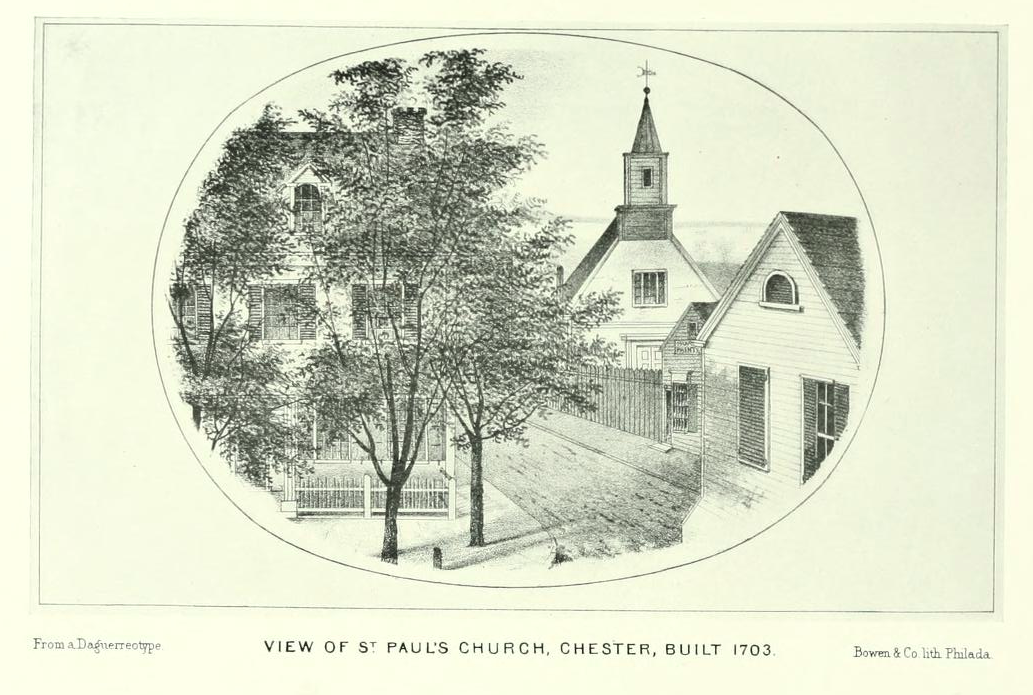
Old Saint Paul's Church (built 1702, demolished 1850)

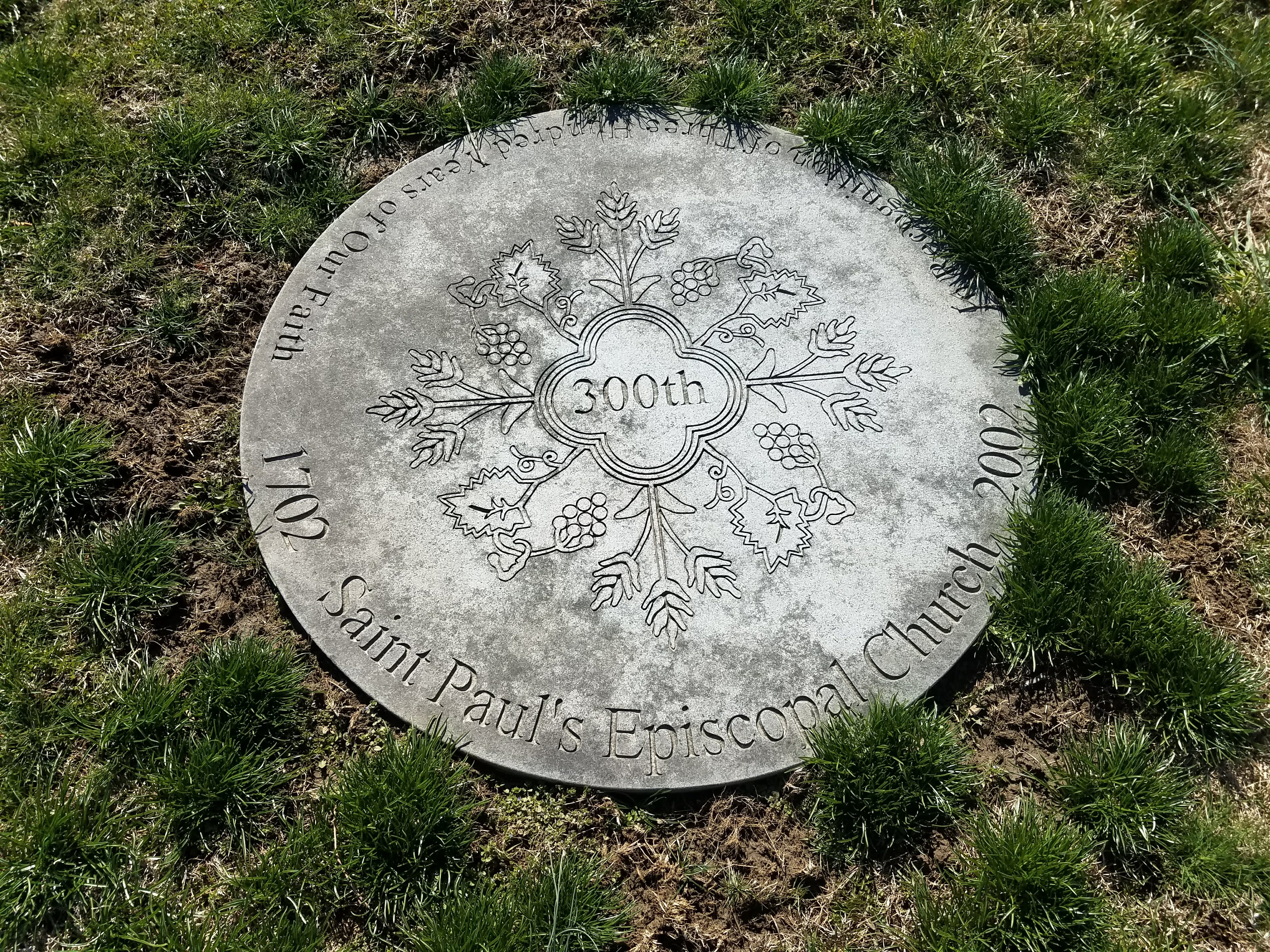
Marker designating location of Old Saint Paul's Church in Old Swedish Burial Ground in Chester, Pennsylvania

In 1700, Reverend Evan Evans was sent to the province of Pennsylvania by the Society for the Propagation of the Gospel in Foreign Parts. He is frequently mentioned in the society records as traveling to Chester, Chichester, Concord and Radnor.

St. Paul's Church was erected on site of the Swedish burial ground in 1702–1703. The original church was built of brick – 49 ft (15 m) in length, 26 ft (7.9 m) in width, and 25 ft (7.6 m) in height – with a wooden steeple containing the bell.

The former Quaker Anglican missionary George Keith is known to have preached at St. Paul's twice in 1702.

The St. Paul's Church parish included St. Martin's Church in Marcus Hook, Pennsylvania and St. John's Church in Concord. In 1704, Reverend Henry Nichols was sent by The Society for the Propagation of the Gospel in Foreign Parts as a missionary to work in all three churches.

In 1707, Reverend Evan Evans, travelled to England and returned the same year with a pewter Holy Communion Service, a gift from Queen Anne to the parish. Inscribed on these are the words "Anna Regina, in usum Eccelesiae Anglicanae apud Philadelphiani, A.D., 1708." The communion service was displayed at the east end of the church.

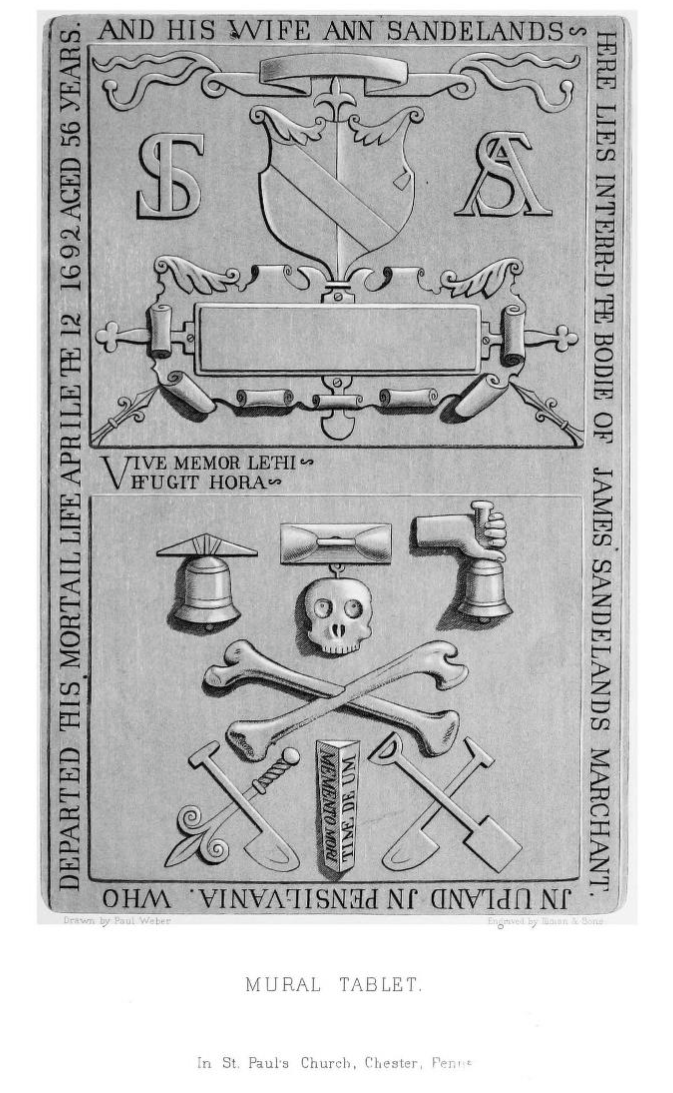
Memorial stone for James Sandilands (1692), merchant in colonial Chester, Pennsylvania

Missionaries were sent from Philadelphia to preach to the congregation, however problems arose due to the distance the preachers had to travel and the church began to have ministers from the Swedish Church in Wilmington, Delaware preside over the congregation.

Israel Acrelius, the noted Swedish Lutheran missionary and priest was a church minister at St. Paul's in 1756.

In the west end of the Old St. Paul's Church was a large grey slab of sandstone erected to the memory of James Sandilands, an early landowner and merchant in Chester, with the following inscription:

"Here lies interr-d the bodie of James Sandelands, marchant, in Upland, in Pennsylvania, who departed this mortal life, Aprile the 12, 1692, aged 56 years, and his wife, Ann Sandelands"

In 1835, extensive repairs were made to the church with an increase in the number of pews and the addition of a gallery in the west end with a large main entrance underneath.

The old St. Paul's Church on Third Street was demolished in 1850.

=== Current church ===
In 1859, a new church was built on the opposite side of Third Street. The new church was built of pointed stone in Gothic style with a spire one hundred and twenty-four feet high.

In 1872, the church was again remodeled. On June 3, 1877, the church was struck by lightning and suffered damage. On March 19, 1884, the church caught fire and suffered additional damage.

In April 1900, the current St. Paul's church was established at the 9th and Madison Street. The English Gothic architecture building is built of granite with doorways and windows of Indiana limestone. The architect was William Provost, Jr.

In 1956, St. Paul's Church received a memorial gift of an Aeolian-Skinner organ.

== Old Swedish Burial Ground ==
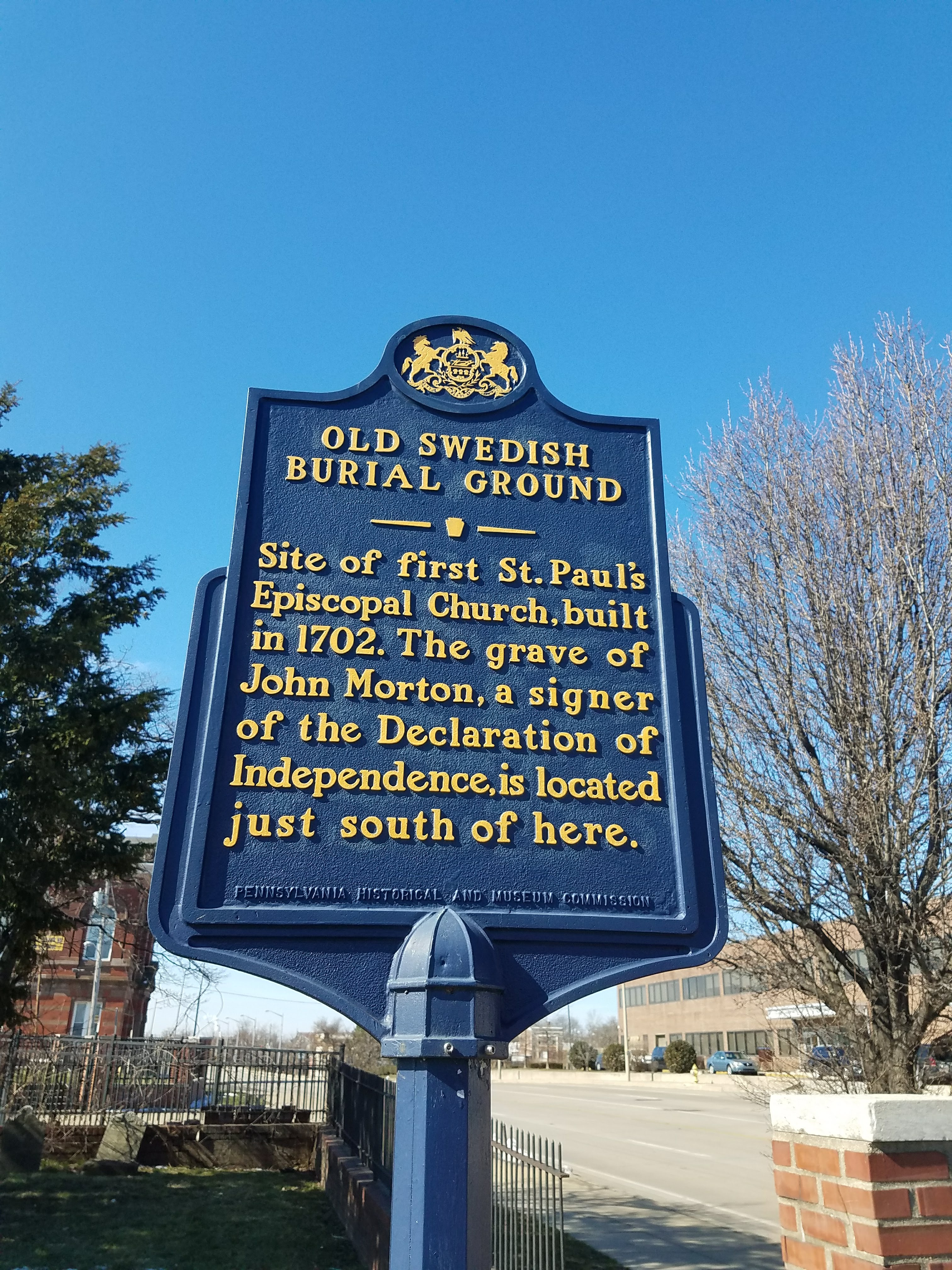
Old Swedish Burial Ground Pennsylvania Historical Marker

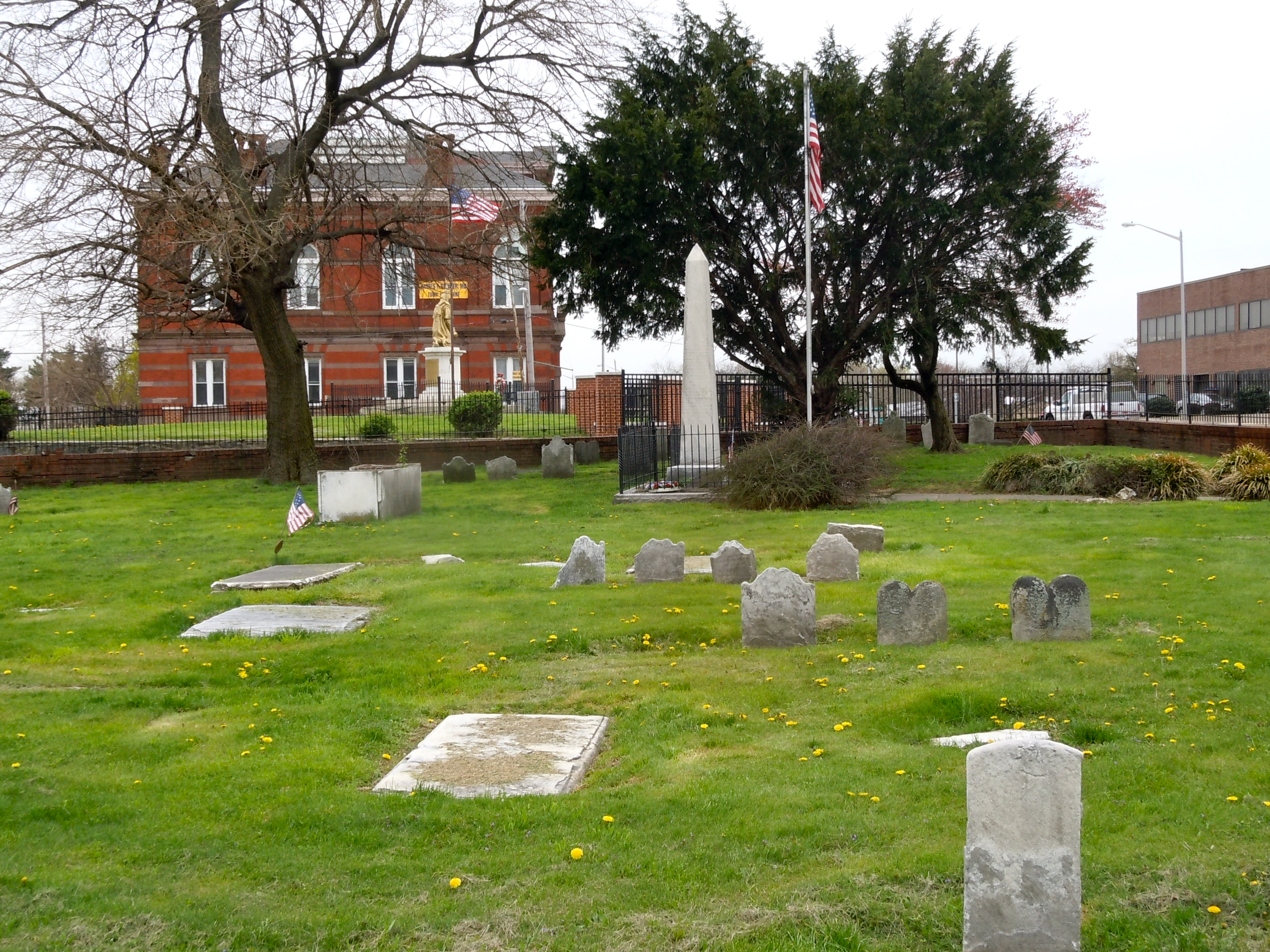
St. Paul's Cemetery

Also known as St. Paul's Burying Ground and St. Paul's Cemetery.

=== John Morton Memorial ===
John Morton, a signer to the Declaration of Independence is buried at the old St. Paul's burial ground. His remains lay beneath a plain marble obelisk, 11 feet in height. The inscription on the west side of the memorial reads:

"Dedicated to the memory of John Morton, A member of the First American Congress from the State of Pennsylvania, Assembled in New York in 1765, and of the next Congress, assembled in Philadelphia in 1774. Born A.D., 1724 – Died April 1777."

The inscription of the east side of the memorial reads:

"In voting by States upon the question of the Independence of the American Colonies, there was a tie until the vote of Pennsylvania was given, two members of which voted in the affirmative, and two in the negative. The tie continued until the vote of the last member, John Morton, decided the promulgation of the Glorious Diploma of American Freedom."

The inscription on the south side of the memorial reads:

"In 1775, while speaker of the Assembly of Pennsylvania, John Morton was elected a Member of Congress, and in the ever memorable session of 1776, he attended that august body for the last time, establishing his name in the grateful remembrance of the American People by signing the Declaration of Independence."

The inscription on the north side of the memorial reads:

"John Morton being censured by his friends for his boldness in giving his casting vote for the Declaration of Independence, his prophetic spirit dictated from his death bed the following message to them: 'Tell them they shall live to see the hour when they shall acknowledge it to have been the most glorious service I ever rendered to my country."

=== David Lloyd ===
David Lloyd, personal lawyer to William Penn, Attorney General of Pennsylvania, six term Speaker of the Pennsylvania General Assembly and Chief Justice of the Pennsylvania Colony is buried at old St. Paul's burial ground along with his wife Grace. The Lloyds were removed to St. Paul's after the Quaker burial ground on Edgemont Avenue between 6th and 7th avenue was removed to make way for new development in October 1959.

=== Major William Anderson ===
William Anderson, a Major in the Continental Army during the American Revolutionary War and a U.S Congressman from Pennsylvania is also buried at Old St. Paul's cemetery.

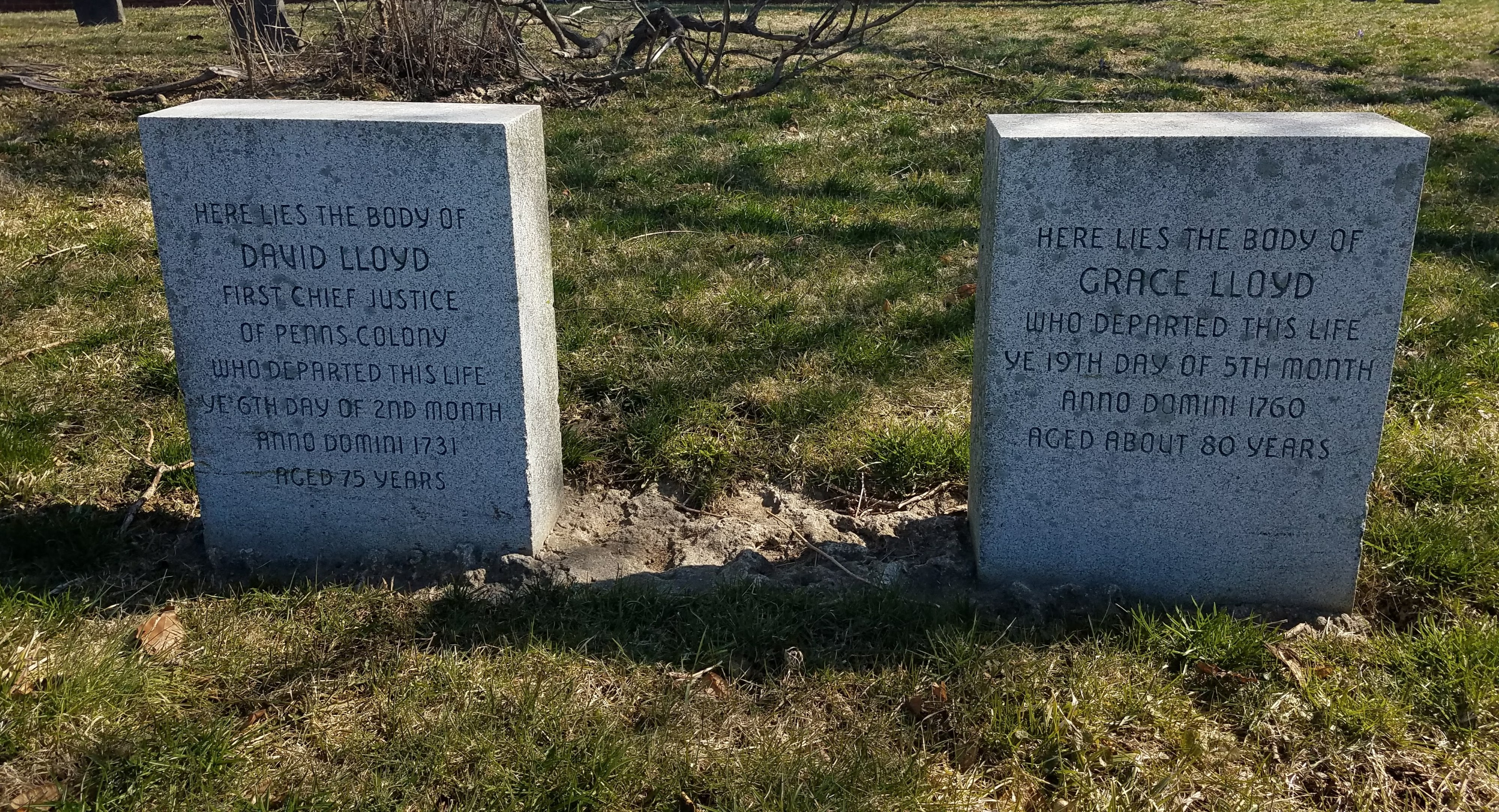
David and Grace Lloyd headstones

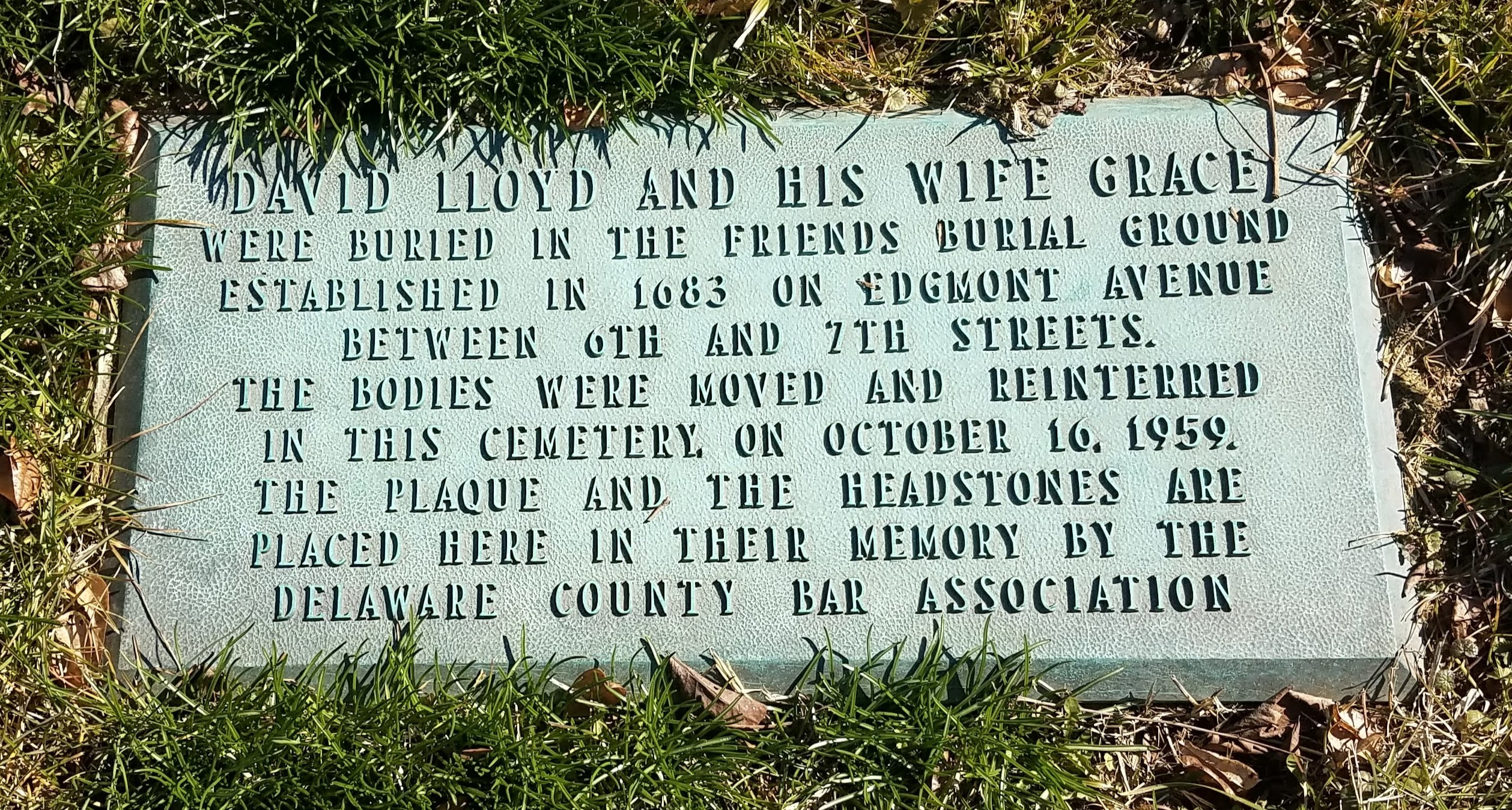
David and Grace Lloyd marker

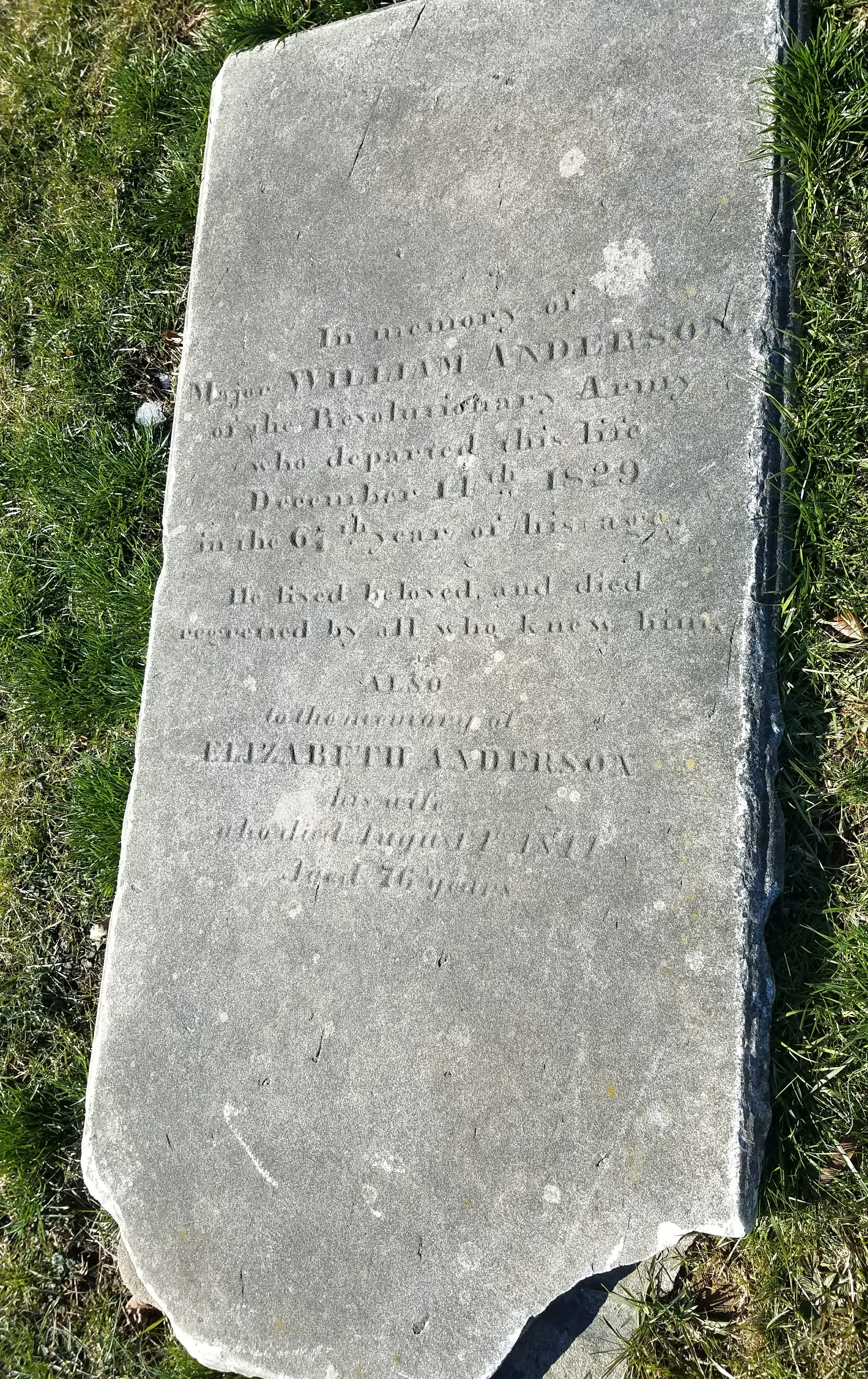
Major William and Elizabeth Anderson gravestone

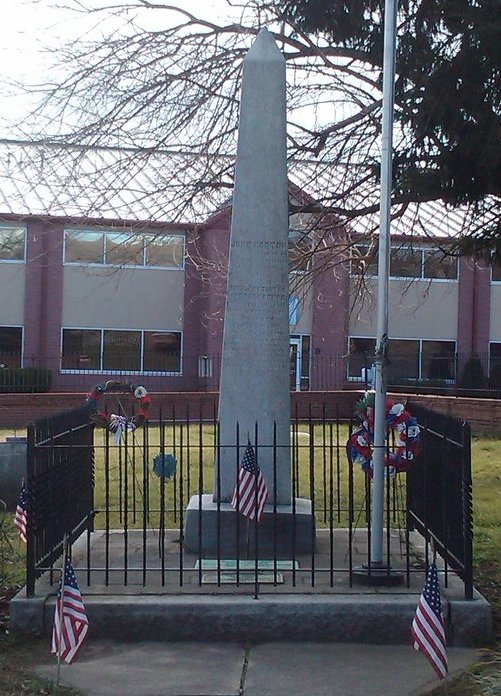
John Morton grave marker
