= David Lloyd (judge) =

American lawyer

Chief Justice of Pennsylvania
- In office 1717 – April 6, 1731
- Preceded by: Roger Mompesson
- Succeeded by: James Logan

Speaker Pennsylvania General Assembly
- In office 1702–1736

Personal details
- Born: January 1, 1656 Montgomeryshire, Wales
- Died: April 6, 1751 Chester, Pennsylvania, British America
- Resting place: Old St. Paul's Church burial ground, Chester, Pennsylvania, U.S.
- Party: Popular party
- Spouse: Grace
- Profession: lawyer

David Lloyd (1656 – April 6, 1751) was a lawyer and politician from Chester, Pennsylvania. He was the first Attorney General of the Province of Pennsylvania and a member of the popular party. He served 9 terms in the Pennsylvania General Assembly, including 9 terms as its Speaker, and 14 years as Chief Justice of the Pennsylvania Supreme Court.

== Early life and family ==
Lloyd was born in 1656 in the parish of Manafon, Montgomeryshire, Wales. He was educated at a grammar school.

Lloyd converted to Quakerism in 1691.

Lloyd was twice married. He married his second wife, Grace Growden in 1703. Together they had a son who died at an early age in 1731 due to an accident.

David Lloyd may have been the cousin of Thomas Lloyd, lieutenant governor of the Province of Pennsylvania.

== Career ==
Lloyd studied law under George Jeffreys. In 1686 he was sent by William Penn to the Province of Pennsylvania and served as Attorney General of the province from 1686 until 1710. Lloyd designed Pennsylvania's first judicial system.

He became successively clerk of the county court of Philadelphia, deputy to the master of the rolls, and clerk of the provincial court.

In 1689, Lloyd was clerk of the County Courts and found himself in difficulties with the council when he refused to produce the records of the court to the council.

In 1698, probably as a punishment for the conflict with the council, he was removed as Attorney General and replaced by John Moore.

Penn's Frame of 1701 (Charter of Privileges) caused disagreement between Lloyd and Penn. There was disagreement over interpretation if the Charter gave control of the province to the assembly or the proprietor (governor). James Logan, Penn's loyal secretary, believed the Proprietor to be the center of power and mobilized those who agreed with him into the Proprietary party. Lloyd believed the assembly to be the center of provincial power, became the leader of the Popular party and fought for thirty years to make his viewpoint a reality.

He was a member of the Pennsylvania General Assembly for 23 years between 1693 and 1728, representing at various times Chester County, Philadelphia County, and the City of Philadelphia, Pennsylvania. For thirteen of those years, he served as Speaker. He also served for five years as a member of the provincial council. In 1702, he was appointed advocate to the Court of Admiralty.

In 1718, Lloyd was appointed Chief Justice of the province by Governor William Keith. During the final years of his life, his mental capacity diminished and a few months before his death the council declared that he was mentally unfit to serve. His death came before he was removed from office.

== Porter House ==
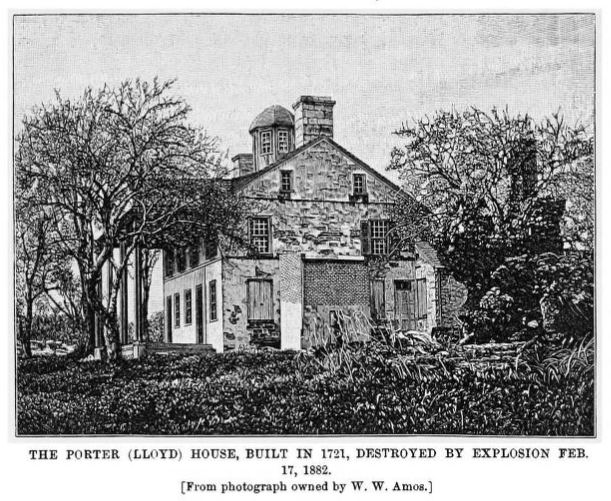
Porter (Lloyd) House

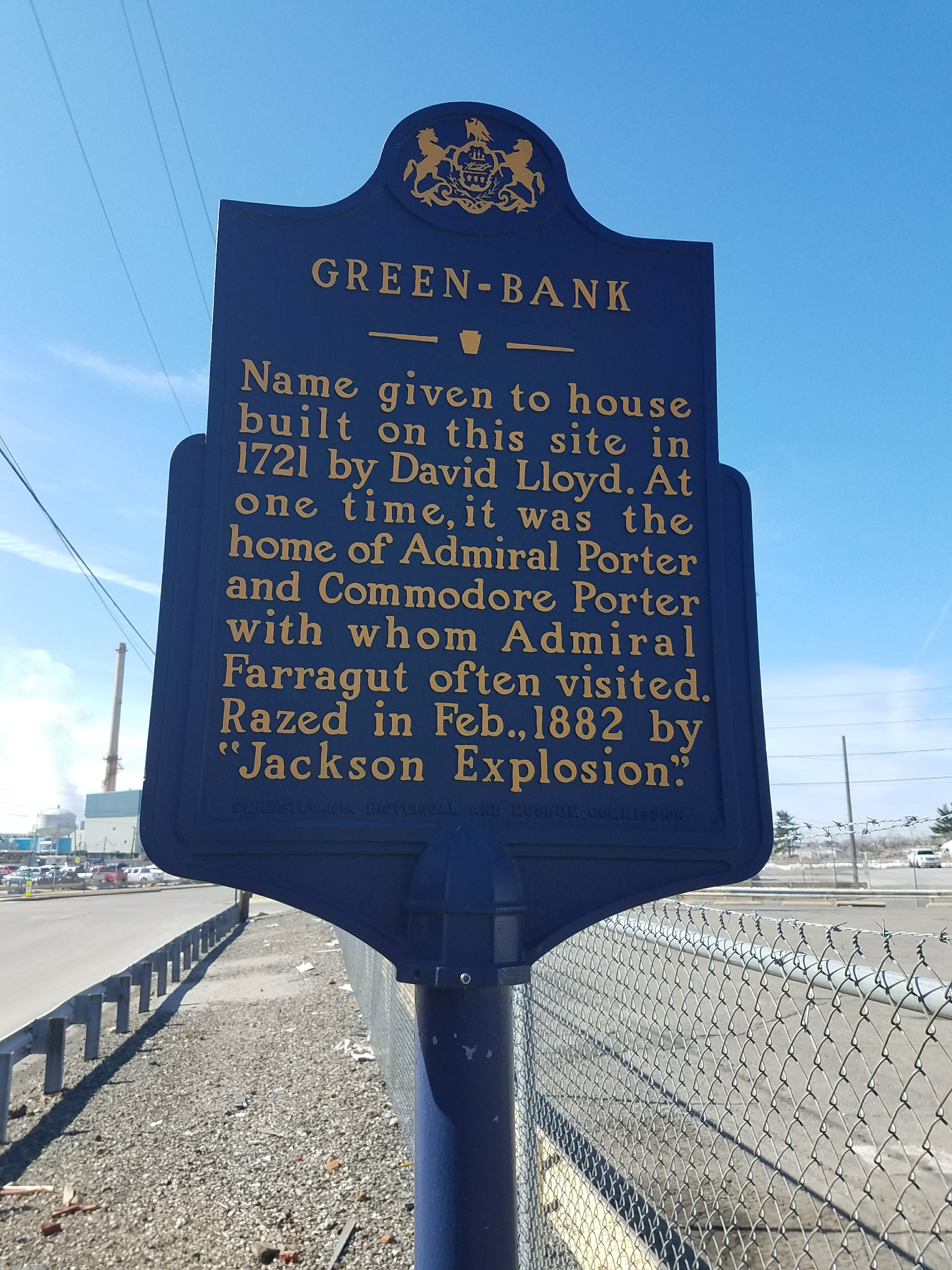
Green Bank Pennsylvania Historical Marker

In 1689, Lloyd purchased a large tract of land in Chester part of which was used as a commons. In 1690, Lloyd secured permission to lay out a street along the line of the current Second Street from Chester Creek to his property. This transaction made him many enemies. He began living in Chester in 1700 on the land he named "Green Bank".

In 1721, Lloyd built a grand house which in subsequent years became the property of Commodore David Porter and became known as the Porter House. The house became the location of Jackson's Pyrotechnic Manufactory and on the evening of February 17, 1882 caught fire and a large stock of fireworks exploded, destroying the home, killing eighteen people and wounding fifty-seven other.

== Death and legacy ==
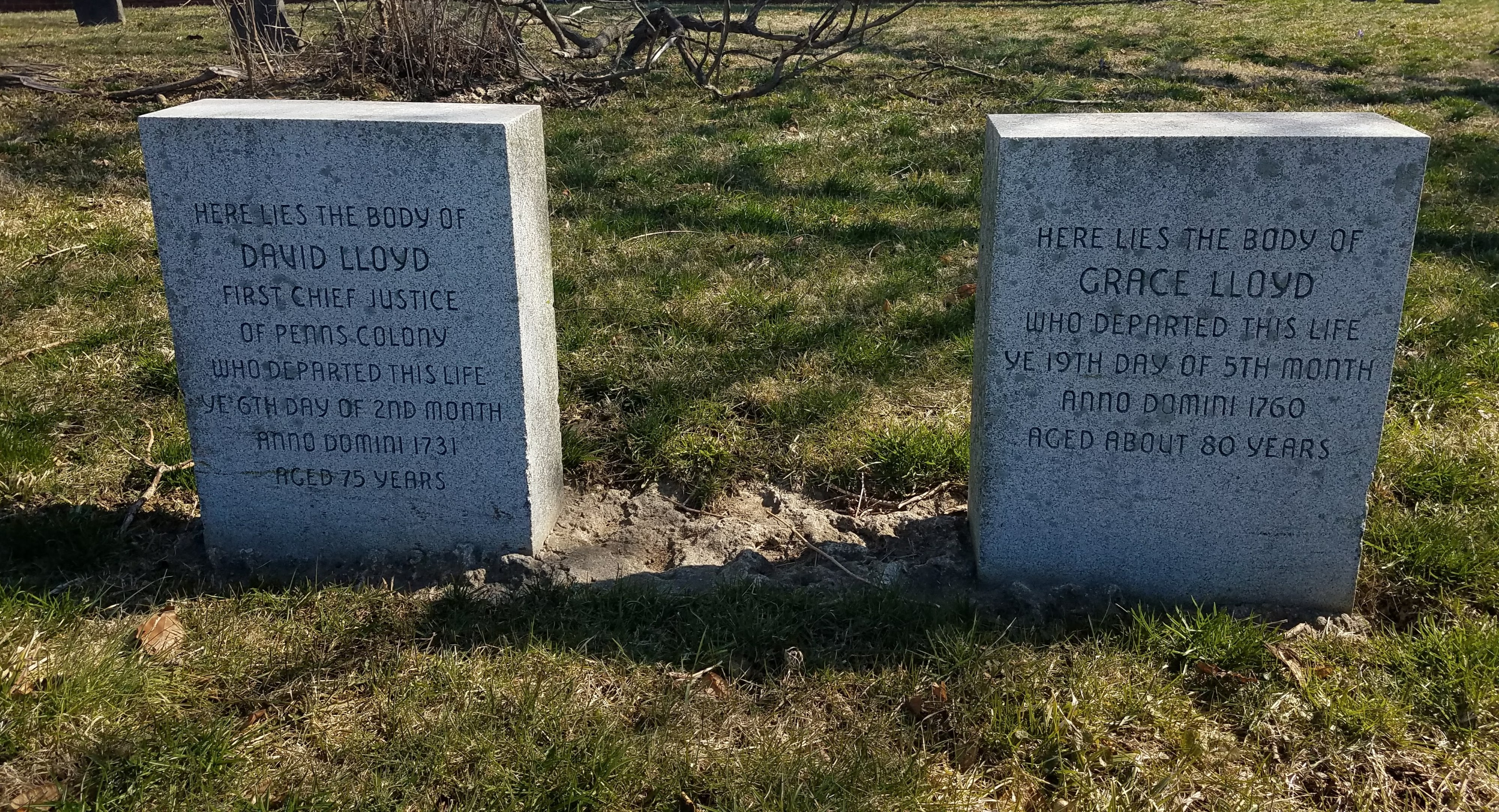
David and Grace Lloyd Headstones in the Old St. Paul's Episcopal Church burial ground in Chester, Pennsylvania

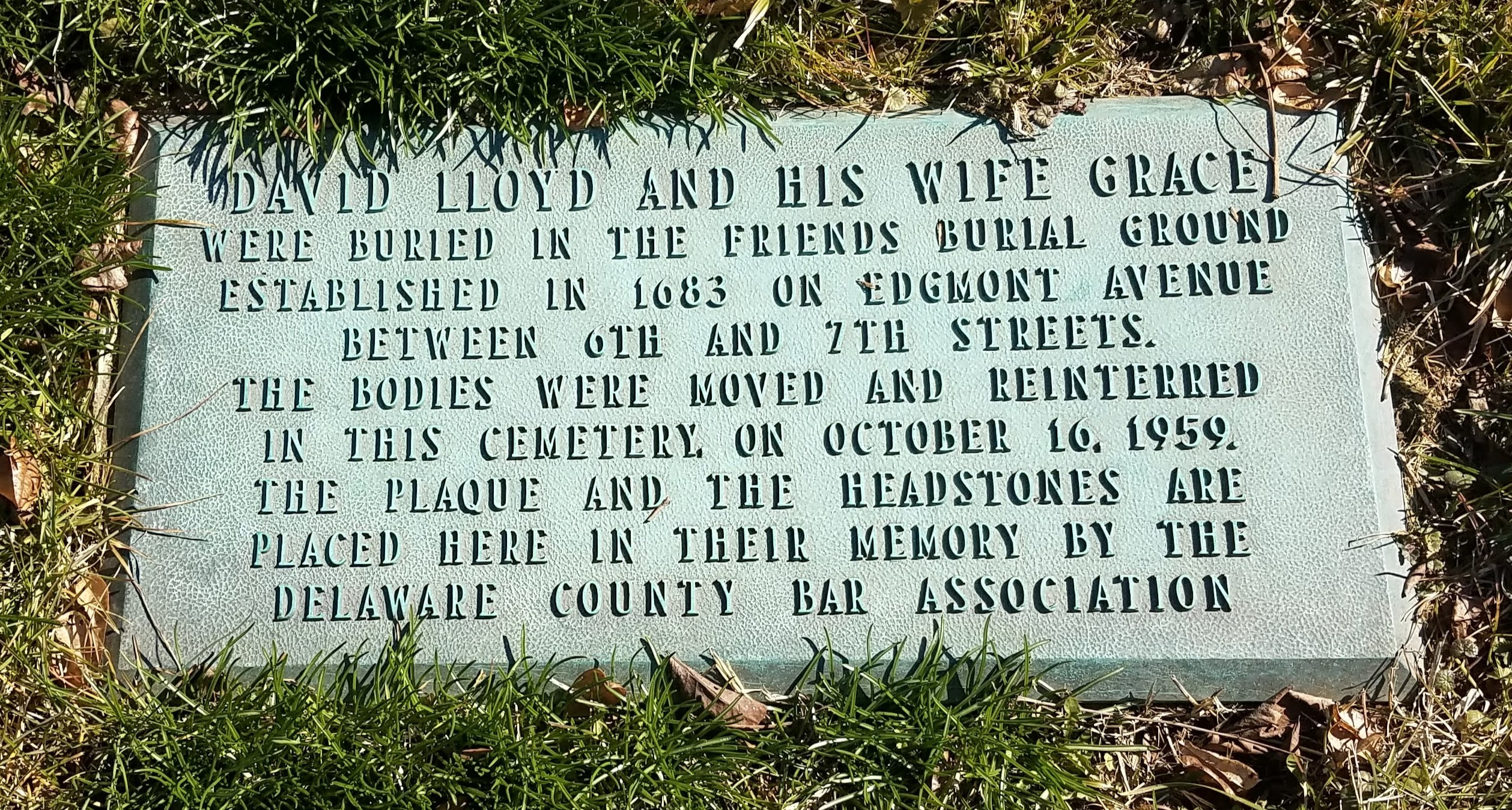
Burial Marker in Old St. Paul's Episcopal Church burial ground at the graves of David and Grace Lloyd

Lloyd died April 6, 1731, in Chester, Pennsylvania and is interred at old St. Paul's Church burial ground. Lloyd and his wife Grace were originally interred at the Quaker burial ground in Chester, but were moved to St. Paul's after the Quaker burial ground was removed to make way for new development in October 1959.

Lloyd street in Chester, Pennsylvania is named after Lloyd.

Abel Morgan's Welsh concordance was dedicated to Lloyd.
