= Jeremiah Langhorne =

American judge

Chief Justice of the Supreme Court of Pennsylvania
- In office 1739–1742
- Preceded by: James Logan
- Succeeded by: William Allen

Personal details
- Died: 1742 Pennsylvania, British America
- Occupation: Jurist; landowner

Jeremiah Langhorne (died 1742) was a prominent landowner and jurist in colonial Pennsylvania. He is the namesake of present-day Langhorne, Pennsylvania, which adopted his name in 1876, and neighboring Langhorne Manor.

A Quaker, Langhorne settled with his family in Bucks County in 1684. Records show that he purchased 7,200 acres (29 km^{2}) there in 1724. He represented Bucks County in the Pennsylvania Provincial Assembly, of which he served twice as Speaker. He was a justice of the Pennsylvania Supreme Court from 1726, and served as chief justice from 1739 until his death in 1742.

| Preceded by James Logan | Chief Justice, Supreme Court of Pennsylvania; 1739–1742 | Succeeded by William Allen |
