= Elmer Kilroy =

Pennsylvania politician

73rd Speaker of the Pennsylvania House of Representatives
- In office 1941–1942
- Preceded by: Ellwood J. Turner
- Succeeded by: Ira T. Fiss

Member of the Pennsylvania House of Representatives from the Philadelphia County district
- In office January 6, 1931 – November 30, 1942

Personal details
- Born: August 4, 1895 Philadelphia, Pennsylvania, U.S.
- Died: November 5, 1961 (aged 66)
- Party: Democratic
- Spouse: Cecelia Higgins
- Profession: salesman, professional baseball and football player

Elmer John Kilroy (August 4, 1895 – November 5, 1961) was Speaker of the Pennsylvania House of Representatives.

== Biography ==
Kilroy was born ib August 4, 1895 in Philadelphia, Pennsylvania, and served in the House from 1931 thorough 1942.

He grandauted from LaSalle College, and served in the United States Marine Corps from 1916 to 1917.

He died on November 5, 1961.

== See also ==
- Speaker of the Pennsylvania House of Representatives

Political offices
Preceded by Ellwood Turner	Speaker of the Pennsylvania House of Representatives; 1941 – 1942	Succeeded by Ira Fiss
Party political offices
Preceded by Leo Mundy	Democratic nominee for Lieutenant Governor of Pennsylvania; 1942 (lost)	Succeeded by John Dent
