= Ellwood J. Turner =

Pennsylvania politician

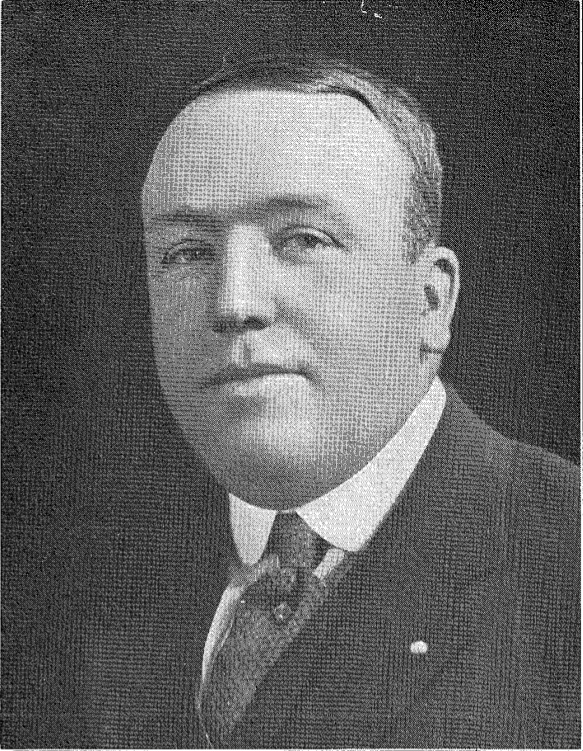

72nd Speaker of the Pennsylvania House of Representatives
- In office 1939–1948
- Preceded by: Roy E. Furman
- Succeeded by: Elmer Kilroy

Member of the Pennsylvania House of Representatives from the Delaware County district
- In office 1925–1948

Personal details
- Born: August 9, 1886 Allegheny, Pennsylvania, U.S.
- Died: March 1, 1948 (aged 61) Chester, Pennsylvania, U.S.
- Party: Republican
- Spouse: Elizabeth Addis Downing
- Children: 5 children
- Education: Swarthmore College; University of Pennsylvania Law School

Ellwood Jackson Turner (August 9, 1886 – March 1, 1948) was an American politician from Pennsylvania who served as a Republican member of the Pennsylvania House of Representatives for Delaware County from 1925 to 1948 and as the 119th Speaker of the Pennsylvania House of Representatives from 1939 to 1941.

== Early life and education ==
Ellwood Turner was born in Allegheny, Pennsylvania, to Frederick Fairthorne and Virginia (née Short) Turner. He moved with his family to Scranton, then Wilkes-Barre where he attended Hilton's Private Academy. The family moved again to Chester and he graduated from Chester High School in 1904.

He attended Swarthmore College for one year before studying at the University of Pennsylvania Law School, receiving his LL.B. degree in 1908. At Penn, he served as class president each year, played on the varsity football team, and was a member of the Mask and Wig Club. In 1909, he was admitted to practice law in Philadelphia county and opened an office in Chester in 1912.

Turner served as a sergeant in company G of the First Pennsylvania Reserve Militia during World War I and as a Four Minute Man.

== Career ==
Turner served on the Civilian Defense Board during World War II. He worked as attorney-at-law and solicitor for the Central Delaware County Sewer Authority and as solicitor for the City of Chester Municipal Water Authority.

Turner was elected as a Republican to the Pennsylvania House of Representatives from Delaware County in 1924 and reelected to serve 8 consecutive terms. He served as Majority Leader from 1933 to 1934 and as Minority Leader from 1935 to 1938 and again from 1941 to 1942.

He was an opponent of fellow Republican Governor Gifford Pinchot and spoke out against Pinchot's proposal to dissolve the state Public Service Commission, and called for transferring control of the state budget from the governor to the auditor general. He also introduced legislation prohibiting more than one family member from working for the state, a proposal which was aimed at Pinchot's personal secretary (who was married to a clerical worker in the governor's office). He was also a leading opponent of Pinchot's Democratic successor, Governor George H. Earle.

Turner became House Speaker after Republicans regained control of the legislature in 1939, serving in that position until 1941. He was elected to the Board of Managers of the Council of State Governments in 1937, serving as chairman in 1940. He also served as chairman of the Interstate Commission on the Delaware River Basin. In 1945, he unsuccessfully challenged E. Wallace Chadwick for the Republican nomination for the county probate court.

== Personal life ==
Turner married Elizabeth Addis Downing in 1911; the couple had five children. He served as the first president of the Kiwanis Club of Chester after it was founded in 1919; he was later elected Governor of the Pennsylvania District (1920) and Vice-President of Kiwanis International (1924).

Turner is interred at the West Laurel Hill Cemetery in Bala Cynwyd, Pennsylvania.
