= Phineas Jenks =

American politician (1781–1851)

Phineas Jenks (May 3, 1781 – August 6, 1851) was a medical doctor and a member of the Pennsylvania House of Representatives. He lived in Newtown. He married Amelia Snyder (June 21, 1791 - August 6, 1859), daughter of Pennsylvania Governor Simon Snyder, in 1820, in Harrisburg.

== Early life ==
Jenks was born in Middletown, PA.

== Medical Doctor ==
Jenks studied medicine with Dr. Benjamin Rush, graduating in 1804 with a diploma from the University of Pennsylvania. He began the practice of medicine under Dr. Isaac Chapman of Wrightstown Township. He was elected a junior member of the Philadelphia Medical Society in 1803. His thesis was An essay on the analogy of the Asiatic and African plague and the American yellow fever. He was the first president of the Bucks County Medical Society.

== Pennsylvania House of Representatives ==
Jenks represented Bucks County from 1815 through 1820, as a member of the Federalist party.

In 1817, Jenks submitted a bill in the Pennsylvania House to make a new county called Penn from the lower portion of Bucks County. On December 1, 1818, Jenks came in last in a vote for the speaker of the Pennsylvania House with one vote. (The speaker elected was Rees Hill with 74 votes. Other votes were: John Purdon - 9, Samuel Bond - 1, and William N. Irvine - 1). On December 7, 1819, he came in second in a vote for speaker with 21 of the 93 votes cast. (The speaker elected was Joseph Lawrence with 56 votes. Other votes were: Rees Hill - 14, Wilson Smith - 1, and William Lehman - 1).

== Other activities ==
He served as a trustee of the Bucks County Academy at Newtown.

In 1825, he was among the leaders of another movement to create Penn County from a portion of Bucks County.

Jenks was one of the original founders of St. Luke's Protestant Episcopal Church in Bucks County in 1836.

Along with Edward M. Paxson, he founded the Bucks County Agricultural Society, in 1843.

He was president of the Newtown Whig Meeting (which took place on August 23, 1844) for the Election of 1844. Estimates of the number of people attending ranged from 8,000 to 20,000.

== Descendants ==
Jenks had a son named George Ante Jenks, who was a cousin of George A. Jenks, Solicitor General of the United States, 1886–1889.
