= Joseph Lawrence (Pennsylvania politician) =

American politician (1786–1842)

Member of the U.S. House of Representatives from Pennsylvania
- In office March 4, 1825 – March 4, 1829
- Preceded by: Thomas Patterson
- Succeeded by: William McCreery
- Constituency: 15th district
- In office March 4, 1841 – April 17, 1842
- Preceded by: Isaac Leet
- Succeeded by: Thomas M. T. Thompson
- Constituency: 21st district

21st Speaker of the Pennsylvania House of Representatives
- In office 1823–1823
- Preceded by: John Gilmore
- Succeeded by: Joel B. Sutherland

19th Speaker of the Pennsylvania House of Representatives
- In office 1820–1820
- Preceded by: Rees Hill
- Succeeded by: John Gilmore

12th Treasurer of Pennsylvania
- In office 1835–1836
- Governor: George Wolf; Joseph Ritner
- Preceded by: Alexander Mahon
- Succeeded by: Daniel Sturgeon

Member of the Pennsylvania House of Representatives
- In office 1818–1824; 1834–1836

Personal details
- Born: 1786 Hunterstown, Pennsylvania
- Died: April 17, 1842 (aged 55–56) Washington, D.C.
- Party: Democratic Republican

Joseph Lawrence (1786 – April 17, 1842) was a member of the U.S. House of Representatives from Pennsylvania.

== Early life ==
Joseph Lawrence (father of George Van Eman Lawrence) was born near Hunterstown, Pennsylvania. He moved with his widowed mother to a farm in Washington County, Pennsylvania, in 1789, and attended the common schools. He engaged in agricultural pursuits.

== Pennsylvania House of Representatives ==
He was a member of the Pennsylvania House of Representatives from 1818 to 1824 and served as 53rd Speaker from December 7, 1819 to December 7, 1822. On December 7, 1819, he was elected speaker with a vote of 56 of 93 representatives voting, out of 94 (other votes were: Phineas Jenks – 21, Rees Hill – 14, Wilson Smith – 1, William Lehman – 1). On December 3, 1822, he was elected speaker with a vote of 65 (other votes were John Gilmore – 23 and Jacob Holgate – 8). In the general election of 1820, he received 3,083 votes.

== United States Congress ==
He was elected as an Adams candidate to the Nineteenth and Twentieth Congresses. He was an unsuccessful candidate for reelection in 1828 to the Twenty-first Congress. He was again a member of the Pennsylvania House of Representatives from 1834 to 1836. He was nominated for the United States Senate in 1836, along with future President James Buchanan and others. He served as state treasurer in 1837. He was an unsuccessful candidate for election in 1838 to the Twenty-sixth Congress. He was elected as a Whig to the Twenty-seventh Congress and served until his death in Washington, D.C. He served as chairman of the United States House Committee on Roads and Canals during the Twenty-seventh Congress.

== Other political activities ==
Lawrence served as chairman of the Democratic convention of PA state legislators in 1824. At the Whig Convention at Wheeling (in Virginia at the time but now West Virginia) in 1840, Lawrence was president of the Pennsylvania delegation. He individually introduced all the soldiers who fought in the American Revolution who were present at the convention.

== Death ==
His death occurred shortly after 11 am. He had been ill for approximately two weeks prior to death; his eldest son and son's wife died weeks before him.

== Memorial ==
On Monday, April 18, 1842, William Wallace Irwin of Pennsylvania took to the floor of the House of Representatives to announce Lawrence's death. He followed with a eulogy. This was the only business transacted in the House on that day. After customary arrangements, the House adjourned for the day. Lawrence is interred in the Congressional Cemetery.

== See also ==
- Speaker of the Pennsylvania House of Representatives
- List of members of the United States Congress who died in office (1790–1899)

== Sources ==
Political offices
Preceded by Alexander Mahon	Treasurer of Pennsylvania; 1835–1836	Succeeded by Daniel Sturgeon
U.S. House of Representatives
Preceded by Thomas Patterson	Member of the U.S. House of Representatives from Pennsylvania's 15th congressional district 1825–1829	Succeeded by William McCreery
Preceded by Isaac Leet	Member of the U.S. House of Representatives from Pennsylvania's 21st congressional district 1841–1842	Succeeded by Thomas M. T. McKennan
