= John P. Glass =

American politician

46th Speaker of the Pennsylvania House of Representatives
- In office 1867–1868
- Preceded by: James R. Kelley
- Succeeded by: Elisha W. Davis

Personal details
- Born: 1821 Pennsylvania, U.S.
- Died: March 15, 1868 (aged 46–47)
- Party: Republican
- Spouse: Emma
- Children: 3

John P. Glass (1821–March 15, 1868) was a member of the Pennsylvania House of Representatives during the American Civil War, and was elected as that legislative body's Speaker in 1867.

== Background ==
Born in Pennsylvania in 1821, Glass was employed in various capacities during his professional life, including as manager of the Pittsburgh Post Office and with the fledgling telegraph industry, during which time he employed Andrew Carnegie as one of his messengers.

During the American Civil War, Glass was commissioned as a captain, and then later re-commissioned as colonel of the 74th Infantry, 5th Regiment of the Excelsior Brigade from Allegheny County.

A Republican, he was elected to the Pennsylvania House of Representatives in 1864, and served through 1867. During his tenure, he introduced legislation to ensure that soldiers and veterans were appropriately supported during and after their service. Nominated to become Speaker of the Pennsylvania House of Representatives for its 1867 session, he was endorsed for the post by Simon Cameron and his supporters while his opponent, Matthew Quay, was endorsed by the sitting governor at that time, Andrew Curtin. Glass ultimately prevailed, however, when Quay withdrew himself from consideration; he was elected as Speaker on January 1, 1867, defeating his other opponent, A. D. Markley, by a vote of 61 to 37.

== Family ==
Glass and his wife, Emma, were the parents of three children: William B., Robert A., and Clara E.

== See also ==
- Speaker of the Pennsylvania House of Representatives
