= Hiram G. Andrews =

American politician (1876–1968)

125th Speaker of the Pennsylvania House of Representatives

Member of the Pennsylvania House of Representatives
- In office January 6, 1959 – November 30, 1962
- Preceded by: Stuart Helm
- Succeeded by: Stuart Helm

Member of the Pennsylvania House of Representatives
- In office January 3, 1955 – November 30, 1956
- Preceded by: Charles Smith
- Succeeded by: Stuart Helm

Member of the Pennsylvania House of Representatives from the Cambria County district
- In office January 3, 1933 – November 30, 1936
- In office January 3, 1939 – November 30, 1940
- In office January 2, 1945 – November 30, 1962

Personal details
- Born: Hiram Gilbert Andrews; September 12, 1876 Troy Grove, Illinois, U.S.
- Died: March 30, 1968 Johnstown, Pennsylvania, U.S.
- Resting place: Grandview Cemetery; Johnstown, Pennsylvania, U.S.
- Party: Independent Citizens Party (before 1934); Democrat (1934 and after)
- Nickname: Hi

Hiram Gilbert Andrews (September 12, 1876 – March 30, 1968) was a Speaker of the Pennsylvania House of Representatives.

== Early life ==
Hiram Gilbert Andrews was born on September 12, 1876, in Troy Grove, Illinois.

== Career ==
Andrews worked as a reporter for 41 years. He worked for the Philadelphia North American newspaper. He covered the Pennsylvania Capitol Grift Scandal and the 1906 Pennsylvania State Capitol dedication. He was editorial director of Johnstown Democrat from 1928 to 1941.

In 1932, Andrews was elected to the Pennsylvania House of Representatives as a member of the Independent Citizens Party. By 1934, he was a Democrat. He served as a member of the house from 1933 to 1936, from 1939 to 1940 and from 1945 to 1962. He was chair of the Legislative Committee to Study the Public School System from 1935 to 1936. He was minority leader of the house from 1945 to 1954 and in 1958. From 1955 to 1956 and from 1959 to 1962, he served as house speaker. He served on the General State Authority from 1949 to 1950. He also served on the State Highway and Bridge Authority Commission from 1949 to 1950 and on the Commission on Interstate Cooperation from 1949 to 1956. He retired in November 1962, at the age of 86, following an unsuccessful bid for reelection. At the time, he retired as the oldest member in the House's history. He was an early supporter for Democratic presidential nominee John F. Kennedy. He was a legislative consultant for the Republican caucus for the Pennsylvania House from 1962 to 1963.

After his retirement from politics, he still attended the House sessions in the Capitol and wrote an editorial column for a Johnstown weekly paper.

== Personal life ==
Andrews was a bachelor. He went by the nickname "Hi".

Andrews died on March 30, 1968, at Lee Hospital in Johnstown. He was interred at Grandview Cemetery in Johnstown.

== Legacy ==
After his death, the Johnstown Rehabilitation Center in Johnstown was named after him. The college Hiram G. Andrews Center in Johnstown is named after him.

== See also ==
- List of Pennsylvania state legislatures
