= Thomas McKean Thompson McKennan =

American politician

Thomas McKennan
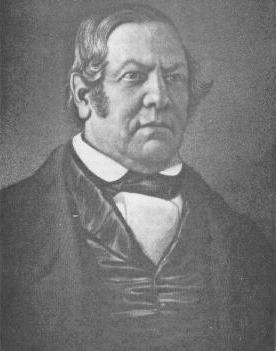

2nd United States Secretary of the Interior
- In office August 15, 1850 – August 26, 1850
- President: Millard Fillmore
- Preceded by: Thomas Ewing
- Succeeded by: Alexander Stuart

Member of the U.S. House of Representatives from Pennsylvania's 21st district
- In office May 30, 1842 – March 3, 1843
- Preceded by: Joseph Lawrence
- Succeeded by: William Wilkins
- In office March 4, 1833 – March 3, 1839
- Preceded by: Constituency established
- Succeeded by: Isaac Leet

Member of the U.S. House of Representatives from Pennsylvania's 15th district
- In office March 4, 1831 – March 3, 1833
- Preceded by: William McCreery
- Succeeded by: Andrew Beaumont

Personal details
- Born: Thomas McKean Thompson McKennan; March 31, 1794 New Castle, Delaware, U.S.
- Died: July 9, 1852 (aged 58) Reading, Pennsylvania, U.S.
- Party: Anti-Masonic (before 1842); Whig (1842–1852)
- Spouse: Matilda Bowman
- Children: 8
- Education: Washington and Jefferson College (BA)

Thomas McKean Thompson McKennan (March 31, 1794 – July 9, 1852) was a 19th-century politician and lawyer who served briefly as United States Secretary of the Interior under President Millard Fillmore.

== Early life ==
McKennan was born in New Castle, Delaware on March 31, 1794, the son of Col. William and Elizabeth Thompson McKennan. He later moved with his family to Washington, Pennsylvania. He graduated from Washington College in 1810 and was admitted to the bar in 1814, commencing practice in Washington.

== Career ==
=== Early career ===
He was a member of the Union Literary Society at Washington College. In a January 1811 speech to the Union Society, McKennan outlined the seven areas of study (Latin and Greek; Mathematics; Rhetoric; Logic; Geography and History; Natural Philosophy; and Moral Philosophy) that comprised the college's curriculum at the time.

He worked as a tutor at Washington College in 1813, as he was studying law. Later, he was a Trustee of the College and was often asked to be President of Washington College, but he refused every time.

=== Pennsylvania politics ===
He was deputy attorney general of Pennsylvania from 1815 to 1816, and served on the Town Council in Washington, Pennsylvania, from 1818 to 1830, and was elected to the twenty-second congress in 1830. He served in the United States House of Representatives from 1831 to 1839, where he made a protective tariff his top priority. McKennan refused to stand as a candidate again in the 1838 elections, and retired from Congress. He served again from 1842 to 1843 as both an Anti-Masonic and Whig to complete the term of his late successor Joseph Lawrence. (The special election was set for May 20, 1842.) He was the chairman of the Committee on Roads and Canals in the twenty-seventh congress.

Despite immense pressure from associates, friends, and the Washington County Whig Party, McKennan again refused to run for another term in Congress, declaring that he had done his duty by serving in public office, and it was time to return to Washington, Pennsylvania, and focus on his law practice. In 1844, his supporters in his hometown of Washington, Pennsylvania, unsuccessfully tried to stir up interest in McKennan as a running mate for Henry Clay, and there is no indication that McKennan himself approved of the idea. McKennan also resisted efforts to entice him to run for governor of Pennsylvania in the 1840s, but in 1848, he served as president of the Pennsylvania electoral college.

=== Secretary of the Interior ===
Upon Millard Fillmore becoming the President of the United States, McKennan was offered the position of the United States Secretary of the Interior, but was reluctant to accept; only after intense pressure from friends and associates did he relent. Almost immediately, he regretted his decision, and resigned after a tenure of only 11 days. McKennan cited his "peculiar nervous temperament" which responded to excitement and depression for his reason to resign. Contemporary accounts also cite disagreements with President Fillmore and Secretary of State Daniel Webster regarding the appointment and removal of attorneys, marshals, clerks, and heads of bureaus. During his brief time as Secretary, McKennan was the head of the 1850 Census, which was being conducted that summer, and he issued a remarkably foresighted statement on the importance of protecting individual privacy:

Information has been received at this office that in some cases unnecessary exposure has been made by the assistant marshals with reference to the business and pursuits, and other facts relating to individuals, merely to gratify curiosity, or the facts applied to the private use or pecuniary advantage of the assistant, to the injury of others. Such a use of the returns was neither contemplated by the act itself nor justified by the intentions and designs of those who enacted the law. No individual employed under sanction of the Government to obtain these facts has a right to promulgate or expose them without authority. ...all marshals and assistants are expected to consider the facts intrusted to them as if obtained exclusively for the use of the Government, and not to be used in any way to the gratification of curiosity, the exposure of any man's business or pursuits, or for the private emolument of the marshals or assistants, who, while employed in this service, act as the agents of the Government in the most confidential capacity.

=== Later career ===
Following his resignation, McKennan took on a less stressful job as the president of the Hempfield Railroad, which was then under construction between Wheeling, Virginia, and Greensburg, Pennsylvania, through his own town of Washington (in 1871, the Baltimore and Ohio Railroad purchased the financially hobbled Hempfield).

== Personal life ==
On December 6, 1815, McKennan married Matilda Lourie Bowman. They had eight children together:

- William McKennan
- Thomas McKennan
- Isabella McKennan
- Jacob Bowman McKennan
- Thomas McKean Thompson McKennan, Jr.
- Anne Elizabeth McKennan
- John Thompson McKennan
- Matilda Bowman McKennan

McKennan died on July 9, 1852, in Reading, Pennsylvania, while on Hempfield Railroad business, and was interred at the Washington Cemetery in his long-time home of Washington, Pennsylvania.

U.S. House of Representatives
Preceded by William McCreery	Member of the U.S. House of Representatives from Pennsylvania's 15th congressional district 1831–1833	Succeeded by Andrew Beaumont
New constituency	Member of the U.S. House of Representatives from Pennsylvania's 21st congressional district 1833–1839	Succeeded by Isaac Leet
Preceded by Joseph Lawrence	Member of the U.S. House of Representatives from Pennsylvania's 21st congressional district 1842–1843	Succeeded by William Wilkins
Political offices
Preceded by Thomas Ewing	United States Secretary of the Interior; 1850	Succeeded by Alexander Stuart
