= Leo C. Mundy =

American physician and politician

Leo C. Mundy (June 2, 1887 – June 11, 1944) was an American physician and politician who served as a Democratic member of the Pennsylvania Senate for the 21st district from 1939 to 1944.

== Early life and education ==
Mundy was born in Wilkes-Barre, Pennsylvania. He attended the public schools and Wyoming Seminary. He received his medical degree from the University of Pennsylvania in 1908.

Mundy served in the United States Army as a captain during World War I. He was placed in charge of a one-thousand-bed military hospital in France. In 1919, he was brevetted lieutenant-colonel and received the distinguished service citation from General John Pershing for heroism in treating and evacuating wounded soldiers under fire.

== Career ==
After the war, Mundy resumed his medical practice and entered politics by directing the campaign of his brother for city council. He became the chair of the Luzerne County Democratic Committee which gave him control over patronage jobs. In 1932, he was a delegate to the Chicago Democratic Convention and actively supported the nomination of Franklin Delano Roosevelt. As a reward for that support, he was appointed collector of internal revenue for the Middle District of Pennsylvania.

Mundy served in the Pennsylvania State Senate for the 21st district from 1939 until his death in 1944.

He died on June 11, 1944, in a hospital in Wilkes-Barre, Pennsylvania after a heart attack.

== Notes ==
Party political offices
Preceded by Thomas Kennedy	Democratic nominee for Lieutenant Governor of Pennsylvania; 1938	Succeeded by Elmer Kilroy
