= Nicholas More =

American lawyer

- Born: London, England
- Died: 1689; Philadelphia, Pennsylvania, U.S.
- Resting place: Philadelphia, Pennsylvania, U.S.
- Occupation: Judge
- Known for: First judge to be impeached in colonial America
- Spouse: Mary
- Children: four

Nicholas More (died 1689) was first chief justice of the colonial-era Province of Pennsylvania.

== Early life and education ==
More, also spelled "Moore" or "Moor", was born in London, England, where he married his wife Mary.

In 1682, More immigrated to the Thirteen Colonies along with William Penn, and lived in the colonial-era Province of Pennsylvania. More was trained in London as a medical physician, but he did not engage in that profession after immigrating to British America.

Soon after settling in the Society Hill section of Philadelphia, he set up "The Free Society of Traders", and became its president. Along with other English merchants, More obtained a parcel of land including just under ten thousand (9,815) acres from Penn for the society in 1684, which became known as the Manor of Moreland.

Part of the land was in Philadelphia County and part was in Montgomery County. More had a town house at the corner of Second and Spruce streets in Philadelphia. He also had a country house at Green Spring, near the Somerton section of Philadelphia.

== Career ==
More became the president or speaker of the first provincial assembly of freemen of Pennsylvania, which assembled on December 4, 1682 in Chester, Pennsylvania. He was secretary and clerk to the provincial council in 1683, and became a member of the assembly from 1684 to 1685.

More was the presiding judge of Philadelphia county courts from 1683 to 1684. He claimed he was an attorney in London, so Penn appointed him to become the first chief justice of the supreme court of the Province of Pennsylvania in 1684.

Because of his arrogant and contentious demeanor he was impeached on May 15, 1685 for "high crimes and misdemeanors", charged with abusing his powers. Ten charges were brought against him in what was the first case impeachment case of a judge in America.

A letter including More's impeachment was forwarded to Penn, who was then in England. He did not grant his official approval of More's impeachment, and expressed confidence in More's abilities. In 1686, Penn nominated him as one of the five commissioners for the executive branch of the Province of Pennsylvania's government. More was later given back his position as chief justice of the colony of Pennsylvania and his job as judge. More made a jail at his country home grounds at Green Spring, and developed a court for hearing cases for prisoners.

Even though More was elected a member of the board of five commissioners for the executive government, he was unable to serve the position because of his poor health.

== Death ==
More died in Philadelphia, in 1689. He was survived by his wife and four children.

== Bibliography ==
- Biographers, Distinguished (1936). The National Cyclopaedia of American biography. New York: James T. White editor.
- Buck, William Joseph (1884). History of Montgomery County, Pennsylvania. Unigraphic.
- Kane, Joseph Nathan; Anzovin, Steven; Podell, Janet (1997). Famous First Facts: Thousands of First Happenings, Discoveries and Inventions that Have Occurred Throughout American History from 10,000 B.C.E. the Date of the Earliest Human Artifacts Found in America, to 1997. H.W. Wilson Company.
- Malone, Dumas; American Council of Learned Societies (1934). Dictionary of American biography. Scribner's sons.
- Wilson, James Grant; Fiske, John (1898). Appletons' Cyclopaedia of American Biography. D. Appleton.
