= 1938 United States House of Representatives elections =

House elections for the 76th U.S. Congress

- November 8, 1938 (Note: September 12, 1938 in Maine)

All 435 seats in the United States House of Representatives 218 seats needed for a majority
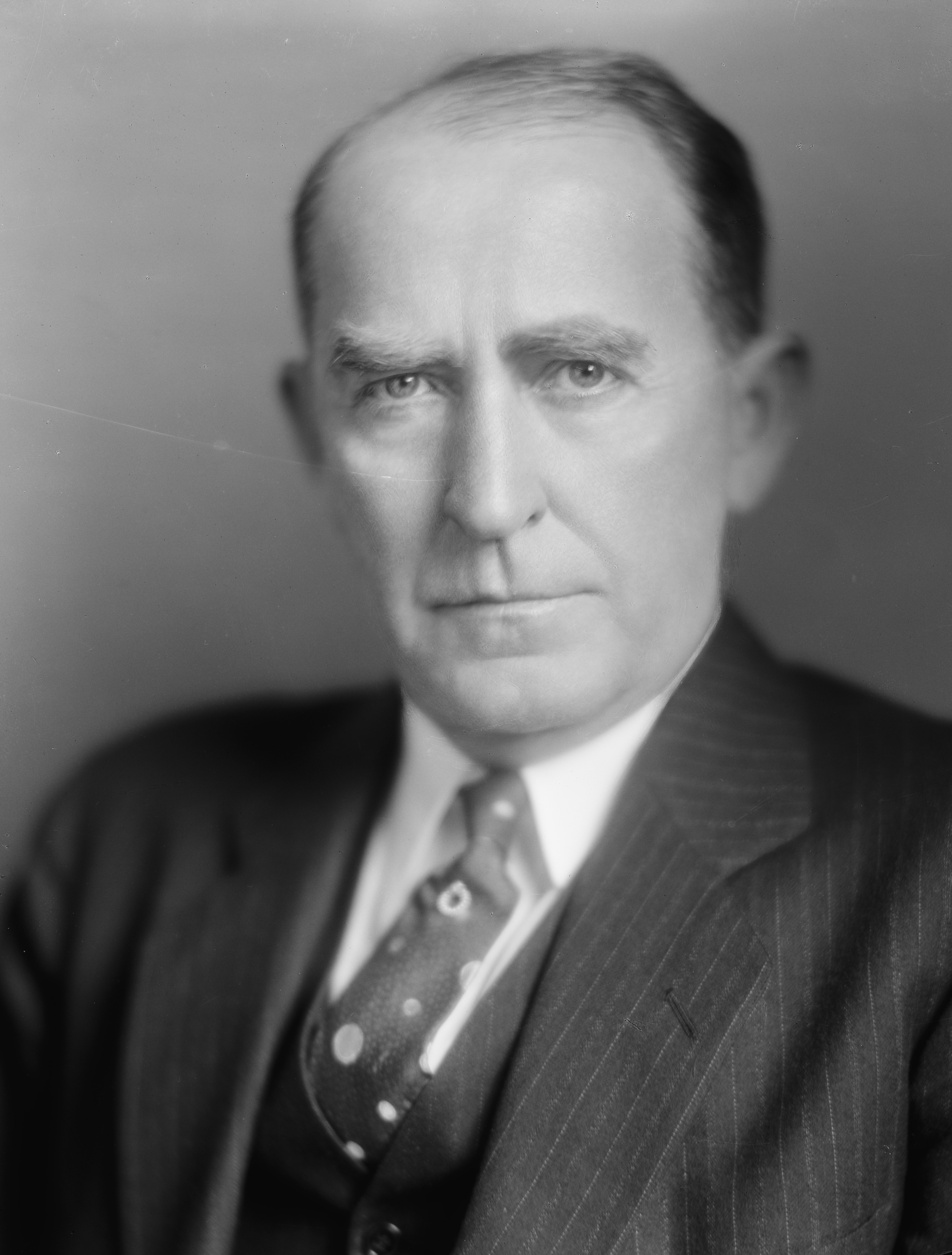

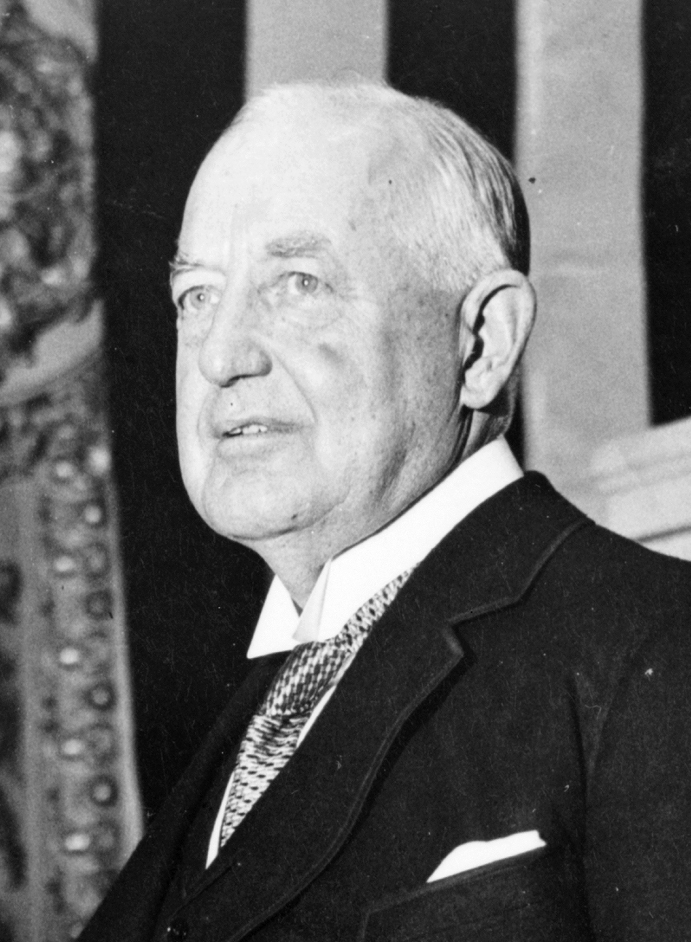
	Majority party	Minority party
Leader	William B. Bankhead	Bertrand Snell (retired)
Party	Democratic	Republican
Leader since	June 4, 1936	March 4, 1931
Leader's seat	Alabama 7th	New York 31st
Last election	334 seats	88 seats
Seats won	262	169
Seat change	▼72	▲81
Popular vote	17,715,450	17,274,585
Percentage	48.7%	47.5%
Swing	▼7.23pp	▲7.83pp
	Third party	Fourth party
Party	National Progressives of America	Farmer–Labor
Last election	8 seats	5 seats
Seats won	2	1
Seat change	▼6	▼4
Popular vote	350,346	342,530
Percentage	1.0%	0.9%
Swing	▼0.28pp	▼0.23pp
	Fifth party
Party	American Labor
Last election	0 seats
Seats won	1
Seat change	▲1
Popular vote	250,796
Percentage	0.7%
Speaker before election
William Bankhead
Democratic
Elected Speaker
William Bankhead
Democratic

The 1938 United States House of Representatives elections was an election for the United States House of Representatives were elections for the United States House of Representatives to elect members to serve in the 76th United States Congress. They were held for the most part on November 8, 1938, while Maine held theirs on September 12. They occurred in the middle of President Franklin D. Roosevelt's second term. Roosevelt's Democratic Party lost a net of 72 seats to the Republican Party, who also picked up seats from minor Progressive and Farmer–Labor Parties.

Multiple factors contributed to the Democratic decline. One main reason was the Recession of 1937. Unemployment soared, undercutting the Democrats' claim that the New Deal had ended the Great Depression. Democrats fought among themselves, especially over Roosevelt's "Court Packing" plan. In addition, there was backlash against Roosevelt's intervention in the Democratic primaries which angered conservative Democrats. The labor unions, which were emerging as a powerful grassroots factor in the New Deal Coalition, split bitterly as the American Federation of Labor and Congress of Industrial Organizations fought over membership. The emergence of the National Progressives of America out of the Wisconsin Progressive Party and the formation of the American Labor Party increased competition during the election and contributed to the Democratic decline.

Internal Democratic strains were exacerbated by an effort led by Roosevelt to purge certain conservative senators in Democratic primaries, including Walter George of Georgia, Millard Tydings of Maryland and Ellison Smith of South Carolina, along with the chairman of the House Rules Committee, John J. O'Connor of New York. All but the last were re-elected.

While a number of New Deal supporters won primary elections, such as Sen. Alben Barkley in Kentucky, who defeated Happy Chandler, in Idaho, Sen. James P. Pope, a prominent New Deal supporter, lost his bid for re-nomination, as did California senator William McAdoo. The many seats Democrats won in traditionally Republican districts in the 1930, 1932, 1934 and 1936 elections meant that they had to defend a large number of marginal seats.

Meanwhile, the Republicans were united; they had shed their weakest members in a series of defeats since 1930. Re-energized Republicans focused attention on strong fresh candidates in major states, especially Robert A. Taft, the conservative from Ohio, Earl Warren (future Chief Justice), the moderate who won both the Republican and the Democratic primaries in California, and Thomas Dewey, the crusading prosecutor from New York. The Republican resurgence in 1938 was made possible by carrying 50% of the vote outside the South, giving GOP leaders confidence it had a strong base for the 1940 presidential election.

== Effects ==
Overall, the Democrats lost 72 seats in the House, though with 262 seats, they retained a majority. The defeats were nearly all in the North, as the South resumed its historic role as the Democratic base in Congress. The Republicans gained 81 seats and none of their incumbents lost reelection.

President Franklin D. Roosevelt had faced opposition from conservative Democrats and the Republicans in Congress since the beginning of his presidency. Representatives Edward E. Cox, Howard W. Smith, and other Southern Democrats opposed Roosevelt's policies with the Republicans, but were in the minority. Vice President John Nance Garner pushed for Roosevelt to support more conservative policies. However, after the election the Democratic majority was maintained, but around forty Democratic representatives were unreliable votes for Roosevelt which allowed conservatives to block his policies.

== Overall results ==
↓
262	4	169
Democratic	(Note: American Labor had 1, Farmer–Labor had 1, and Progressives had 2.)	Republican

Party	Total seats (change)		Seat percentage	Vote percentage	Popular vote
Democratic Party	262	▼72	60.2%	48.7%	17,715,450
Republican Party	169	▲81	38.9%	47.5%	17,274,585
National Progressives of America	2	▼6	0.5%	1.0%	350,346
Farmer–Labor Party	1	▼4	0.2%	0.9%	342,530
American Labor Party	1	▲1	0.2%	0.7%	250,796
Socialist Party	0	Steady	0.0%	0.4%	141,575
Townsend Party	0	Steady	0.0%	0.3%	96,489
Independents	0	Steady	0.0%	0.2%	81,170
Communist Party	0	Steady	0.0%	0.1%	28,781
Royal Oak Party	0	Steady	0.0%	<0.1%	8,783
Prohibition Party	0	Steady	0.0%	<0.1%	8,499
Union Party	0	Steady	0.0%	<0.1%	5,905
Socialist Workers Party	0	Steady	0.0%	<0.1%	2,641
Liberal Labor Choice Party	0	Steady	0.0%	<0.1%	2,627
Constitutional Democrat Party	0	Steady	0.0%	<0.1%	971
Socialist Labor Party	0	Steady	0.0%	<0.1%	753
Kenney For Congress Party	0	Steady	0.0%	<0.1%	527
Freedom Party	0	Steady	0.0%	<0.1%	492
Create Steady Employment Party	0	Steady	0.0%	<0.1%	489
State Rights Party	0	Steady	0.0%	<0.1%	314
Pathfinders Party	0	Steady	0.0%	<0.1%	215
Commonwealth Party	0	Steady	0.0%	<0.1%	113
Others	0	Steady	0.0%	0.1%	45,368
Totals	435	Steady	100.0%	100.0%	36,359,419

Source: Election Statistics - Office of the Clerk

Popular vote
Democratic	48.72%
Republican	47.51%
Progressive	0.96%
Farmer–Labor	0.94%
American Labor	0.69%
Others	1.18%

House seats
Democratic	60.23%
Republican	38.85%
Progressive	0.46%
Farmer–Labor	0.23%
American Labor	0.23%

Results shaded according to winning candidate's share of the popular vote

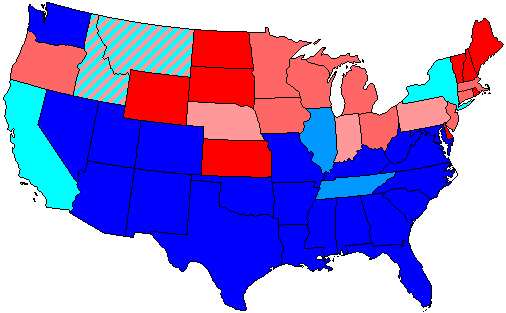
House seats by party holding plurality in state: 80%+ Democratic / 80%+ Republican; 60%+ to 80% Democratic / 60%+ to 80% Republican; Up to 60% Democratic / Up to 60% Republican

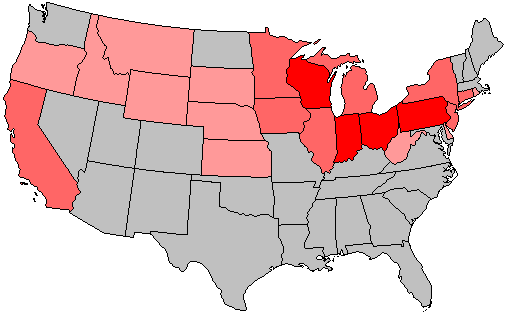
Net gain per state: 6+ Democratic gain / 6+ Republican gain; 3-5 Democratic gain / 3-5 Republican gain; 1-2 Democratic gain / 1-2 Republican gain; no net change

== Special elections ==
District	Incumbent			This race	
District	Member	Party	First elected	Results	Candidates
Kentucky 8	Fred M. Vinson	Democratic	1930	Incumbent resigned May 27, 1938 to become justice of the U.S. Court of Appeals for the D.C. Circuit. New member elected June 4, 1938. Democratic hold.	▌ ✓ Joe B. Bates (Democratic) 52.9%; ▌James C. Sparks (Republican) 47.1%
Alabama 2	J. Lister Hill	Democratic	1923 (special)	Incumbent resigned January 11, 1938 when appointed U.S. senator. New member elected June 14, 1938. Democratic hold.	▌ ✓ George M. Grant (Democratic) 100.0%
South Carolina 6	Allard H. Gasque	Democratic	1922	Incumbent died June 17, 1938. New member elected September 13, 1938. Democratic hold.	▌ ✓ Elizabeth H. Gasque (Democratic) 95.9%; ▌E. I. Reardon (Unknown) 2.3%; ▌J. C. Hayes (Unknown) 1.8%
Ohio 4	Frank L. Kloeb	Democratic	1932	Incumbent resigned August 19, 1937 when appointed judge of the U.S. District Court for the Northern District of Ohio. New member elected November 8, 1938. Republican gain.	▌ ✓ Walter H. Albaugh (Republican) 54.9%; ▌Roy E. Layton (Democratic) 45.1%

== Alabama ==
District	Incumbent	Party	First elected	Result	Candidates
Alabama 1	Frank W. Boykin	Democratic	1935 (special)	Incumbent re-elected.	▌ ✓ Frank W. Boykin (Democratic); Uncontested
Alabama 2	George M. Grant	Democratic	1938 (special)	Incumbent re-elected.	▌ ✓ George M. Grant (Democratic); Uncontested
Alabama 3	Henry B. Steagall	Democratic	1914	Incumbent re-elected.	▌ ✓ Henry B. Steagall (Democratic); Uncontested
Alabama 4	Sam Hobbs	Democratic	1934	Incumbent re-elected.	▌ ✓ Sam Hobbs (Democratic) 88.2%; ▌C. W. McKay (Republican) 11.8%
Alabama 5	Joe Starnes	Democratic	1934	Incumbent re-elected.	▌ ✓ Joe Starnes (Democratic) 99.7%; ▌Frank J. Payne (Independent) 0.3%
Alabama 6	Pete Jarman	Democratic	1936	Incumbent re-elected.	▌ ✓ Pete Jarman (Democratic); Uncontested
Alabama 7	William B. Bankhead	Democratic	1916	Incumbent re-elected.	▌ ✓ William B. Bankhead (Democratic) 71.3%; ▌E. M. Reed (Republican) 28.7%
Alabama 8	John Sparkman	Democratic	1936	Incumbent re-elected.	▌ ✓ John Sparkman (Democratic); Uncontested
Alabama 9	Luther Patrick	Democratic	1936	Incumbent re-elected.	▌ ✓ Luther Patrick (Democratic) 93.5%; ▌J. G. Bass (Republican) 6.5%

== Arizona ==
Results by county Murdock: 70–80% 80–90% >90%

District	Incumbent	Party	First elected	Result	Candidates
Arizona at-large	John R. Murdock	Democratic	1936	Incumbent re-elected.	▌ ✓ John R. Murdock (Democratic) 80.3%; ▌M. E. Cassidy (Republican) 19.7%

== Arkansas ==
District	Incumbent	Party	First elected	Result	Candidates
Arkansas 1	William J. Driver	Democratic	1920	Incumbent lost renomination. Democratic hold.	▌ ✓ Ezekiel C. Gathings (Democratic); Uncontested
Arkansas 2	Vacant		1930	John E. Miller (D) resigned November 14, 1937 when elected U.S. senator. Democratic hold.	▌ ✓ Wilbur Mills (Democratic); Uncontested
Arkansas 3	Claude Fuller	Democratic	1928	Incumbent lost renomination. Democratic hold.	▌ ✓ Clyde T. Ellis (Democratic); Uncontested
Arkansas 4	William B. Cravens	Democratic	1932	Incumbent re-elected.	▌ ✓ William B. Cravens (Democratic); Uncontested
Arkansas 5	David D. Terry	Democratic	1933 (special)	Incumbent re-elected.	▌ ✓ David D. Terry (Democratic); Uncontested
Arkansas 6	John L. McClellan	Democratic	1934	Retired to run for U.S. senator. Democratic hold.	▌ ✓ William F. Norrell (Democratic); Uncontested
Arkansas 7	Wade H. Kitchens	Democratic	1936	Incumbent re-elected.	▌ ✓ Wade H. Kitchens (Democratic); Uncontested

== California ==
District	Incumbent	Party	First elected	Result	Candidates
California 1	Clarence F. Lea	Democratic	1916	Incumbent re-elected.	▌ ✓ Clarence F. Lea (Democratic) 63.0%; ▌Ernest S. Mitchell (Townsend) 37.0%
California 2	Harry Lane Englebright	Republican	1926	Incumbent re-elected.	▌ ✓ Harry Lane Englebright (Republican); Uncontested
California 3	Frank H. Buck	Democratic	1932	Incumbent re-elected.	▌ ✓ Frank H. Buck (Democratic) 93.3%; ▌Nora Conklin (Communist) 6.5%; ▌George C. Kimber (Write-in) 0.3%
California 4	Franck R. Havenner	Progressive	1936	Incumbent re-elected as a Democrat. Democratic gain.	▌ ✓ Franck R. Havenner (Democratic) 61.2%; ▌Kennett B. Dawson (Republican) 38.8%
California 5	Richard J. Welch	Republican	1926	Incumbent re-elected.	▌ ✓ Richard J. Welch (Republican); Uncontested
California 6	Albert E. Carter	Republican	1924	Incumbent re-elected.	▌ ✓ Albert E. Carter (Republican) 94.4%; ▌Dave L. Saunders (Communist) 5.6%
California 7	John H. Tolan	Democratic	1934	Incumbent re-elected.	▌ ✓ John H. Tolan (Democratic) 55.3%; ▌Charles Wade Snook (Republican) 44.7%
California 8	John J. McGrath	Democratic	1932	Incumbent lost re-election. Republican gain.	▌ ✓ Jack Z. Anderson (Republican) 55.0%; ▌John J. McGrath (Democratic) 45.0%
California 9	Bertrand W. Gearhart	Republican	1934	Incumbent re-elected.	▌ ✓ Bertrand W. Gearhart (Republican) 96.3%; ▌George H. Sciaroni (Write-in) 3.7%
California 10	Alfred J. Elliott	Democratic	1937 (special)	Incumbent re-elected.	▌ ✓ Alfred J. Elliott (Democratic) 67.3%; ▌F. Fred Hoelscher (Republican) 32.7%
California 11	John S. McGroarty	Democratic	1934	Retired to run for Secretary of State of California. Republican gain.	▌ ✓ Carl Hinshaw (Republican) 47.0%; ▌Stuart Hamblen (Democratic) 41.1%; ▌Ralph D. Horton (Townsend) 8.7%; ▌John R. Grey (Progressive) 2.6%; ▌Orla E. Lair (Communist) 0.6%
California 12	Jerry Voorhis	Democratic	1936	Incumbent re-elected.	▌ ✓ Jerry Voorhis (Democratic) 60.8%; ▌Eugene W. Nixon (Republican) 32.8%; ▌Russell R. Hand (Townsend) 6.4%
California 13	Charles Kramer	Democratic	1932	Incumbent re-elected.	▌ ✓ Charles Kramer (Democratic) 65.9%; ▌K. L. Stockton (Republican) 30.7%; ▌Louis Baron (Communist) 3.5%
California 14	Thomas F. Ford	Democratic	1932	Incumbent re-elected.	▌ ✓ Thomas F. Ford (Democratic) 68.3%; ▌William D. Campbell (Republican) 31.7%
California 15	John M. Costello	Democratic	1934	Incumbent re-elected.	▌ ✓ John M. Costello (Democratic) 60.4%; ▌O. D. Thomas (Republican) 37.4%; ▌Emil Freed (Communist) 2.1%
California 16	John F. Dockweiler	Democratic	1932	Retired to run for Governor of California and then lost re-election as Independent. Republican gain.	▌ ✓ Leland M. Ford (Republican) 62.8%; ▌John F. Dockweiler (Write-in) 21.2%; ▌Ted E. Felt (Townsend) 10.3%; ▌J. Barton Hutchins (Progressive) 4.3%; ▌La Rue McCormick (Communist) 1.3%
California 17	Charles J. Colden	Democratic	1932	Incumbent died. Democratic hold.	▌ ✓ Lee E. Geyer (Democratic) 58.8%; ▌Clifton A. Hix (Republican) 28.0%; ▌Fred C. Wagner (Townsend) 9.2%; ▌Robert O. Bates (Progressive) 3.9%
California 18	Byron N. Scott	Democratic	1934	Incumbent lost re-election. Republican gain.	▌ ✓ Thomas M. Eaton (Republican) 48.6%; ▌Byron N. Scott (Democratic) 48.3%; ▌Solomon Carr (Progressive) 3.1%
California 19	Harry R. Sheppard	Democratic	1936	Incumbent re-elected.	▌ ✓ Harry R. Sheppard (Democratic) 53.3%; ▌C. T. Johnson (Republican) 46.7%
California 20	Edouard Izac	Democratic	1936	Incumbent re-elected.	▌ ✓ Edouard Izac (Democratic) 60.4%; ▌John L. Bacon (Republican) 39.6%

== Colorado ==
District	Incumbent	Party	First elected	Result	Candidates
Colorado 1	Lawrence Lewis	Democratic	1932	Incumbent re-elected.	▌ ✓ Lawrence Lewis (Democratic) 65.3%; ▌William I. Reilly (Republican) 33.4%; ▌Edgar P. Sherman (Socialist) 0.7%; ▌Oliver L. Barnes (Prohibition) 0.5%
Colorado 2	Fred N. Cummings	Democratic	1932	Incumbent re-elected.	▌ ✓ Fred N. Cummings (Democratic) 51.7%; ▌William S. Hill (Republican) 47.6%; ▌Charles R. Axelson (Socialist) 0.6%
Colorado 3	John Andrew Martin	Democratic	1932	Incumbent re-elected.	▌ ✓ John Andrew Martin (Democratic) 57.4%; ▌Henry Leonard (Republican) 42.6%
Colorado 4	Edward T. Taylor	Democratic	1908	Incumbent re-elected.	▌ ✓ Edward T. Taylor (Democratic) 63.7%; ▌John S. Woody (Republican) 36.3%

== Connecticut ==
District	Incumbent	Party	First elected	Result	Candidates
Connecticut 1	Herman P. Kopplemann	Democratic	1932	Incumbent lost re-election. Republican gain.	▌ ✓ William J. Miller (Republican) 43.5%; ▌Herman P. Kopplemann (Democratic) 40.8%; ▌Edward C. Roffler (Socialist) 15.7%
Connecticut 2	William J. Fitzgerald	Democratic	1936	Incumbent lost re-election. Republican gain.	▌ ✓ Thomas R. Ball (Republican) 48.4%; ▌William J. Fitzgerald (Democratic) 45.2%; ▌Thomas E. Bowman (Socialist) 6.4%
Connecticut 3	James A. Shanley	Democratic	1934	Incumbent re-elected.	▌ ✓ James A. Shanley (Democratic) 43.4%; ▌Ranulf Compton (Republican) 43.2%; ▌Harry Watstein (Socialist) 13.3%; ▌Ernest Castigliani (Labor) 0.1%
Connecticut 4	Alfred N. Phillips	Democratic	1936	Incumbent lost re-election. Republican gain.	▌ ✓ Albert E. Austin (Republican) 43.4%; ▌Alfred N. Phillips (Democratic) 31.4%; ▌Charles H. McLevy (Socialist) 24.9%; ▌Jack C. Bergen (Labor) 0.2%; ▌Clara Scala (Communist) 0.1%
Connecticut 5	J. Joseph Smith	Democratic	1934	Incumbent re-elected.	▌ ✓ J. Joseph Smith (Democratic) 42.0%; ▌Roy E. Rice (Republican) 41.8%.; ▌John W. Ring (Socialist) 16.2%
Connecticut at-large	William M. Citron	Democratic	1934	Incumbent lost re-election. Republican gain.	▌ ✓ B. J. Monkiewicz (Republican) 43.1%; ▌William M. Citron (Democratic) 39.7%; ▌Arthur F. King (Socialist) 15.8%; ▌Alfred Johnson (Socialist Labor) 1.1%; ▌F. Henry Sattler (Union) 0.2%; ▌Jacob Winnewisser (Labor) 0.1%

== Delaware ==
District	Incumbent	Party	First elected	Result	Candidates
Delaware at-large	William F. Allen	Democratic	1936	Incumbent lost re-election. Republican gain.	▌ ✓ George S. Williams (Republican) 55.9%; ▌William F. Allen (Democratic) 43.3%; ▌William J. Highfield (Ind. Republican) 0.8%; ▌Ralph L. Brown (Progressive) 0.10%

== Florida ==
District	Incumbent	Party	First elected	Result	Candidates
Florida 1	J. Hardin Peterson	Democratic	1932	Incumbent re-elected.	▌ ✓ J. Hardin Peterson (Democratic); Uncontested
Florida 2	Robert A. Green	Democratic	1932	Incumbent re-elected.	▌ ✓ Robert A. Green (Democratic); Uncontested
Florida 3	Millard Caldwell	Democratic	1932	Incumbent re-elected.	▌ ✓ Millard Caldwell (Democratic); Uncontested
Florida 4	J. Mark Wilcox	Democratic	1932	Retired to run for U.S. senator. Democratic hold.	▌ ✓ Pat Cannon (Democratic) 81.5%; ▌J. S. G. Gallagher (Republican) 18.5%
Florida 5	Joe Hendricks	Democratic	1936	Incumbent re-elected.	▌ ✓ Joe Hendricks (Democratic); Uncontested

== Georgia ==
District	Incumbent	Party	First elected	Result	Candidates
Georgia 1	Hugh Peterson	Democratic	1934	Incumbent re-elected.	▌ ✓ Hugh Peterson (Democratic) 99.3%; ▌H. W. Shepard (Republican) 0.7%
Georgia 2	Edward E. Cox	Democratic	1924	Incumbent re-elected.	▌ ✓ Edward E. Cox (Democratic); Uncontested
Georgia 3	Stephen Pace	Democratic	1936	Incumbent re-elected.	▌ ✓ Stephen Pace (Democratic) 100.0%; ▌Alexander Stephens Mitchell (Independent) 0.02%
Georgia 4	Emmett Marshall Owen	Democratic	1932	Incumbent re-elected.	▌ ✓ Emmett Marshall Owen (Democratic); Uncontested
Georgia 5	Robert Ramspeck	Democratic	1929 (special)	Incumbent re-elected.	▌ ✓ Robert Ramspeck (Democratic) 97.2%; ▌Henry A. Alexander (Republican) 2.8%
Georgia 6	Carl Vinson	Democratic	1914	Incumbent re-elected.	▌ ✓ Carl Vinson (Democratic) 99.9%; ▌H. W. Shepard (Republican) 0.1%
Georgia 7	Malcolm C. Tarver	Democratic	1926	Incumbent re-elected.	▌ ✓ Malcolm C. Tarver (Democratic) 100.0%; ▌Alexander Stephens Mitchell (Independent) 0.02%
Georgia 8	Braswell Deen	Democratic	1932	Incumbent retired. Democratic hold.	▌ ✓ W. Benjamin Gibbs (Democratic); Uncontested
Georgia 9	B. Frank Whelchel	Democratic	1934	Incumbent re-elected.	▌ ✓ B. Frank Whelchel (Democratic) 99.9%; ▌E. L. McCravey (Independent) 0.1%
Georgia 10	Paul Brown	Democratic	1933 (special)	Incumbent re-elected.	▌ ✓ Paul Brown (Democratic) 94.4%; ▌D. Talmadge Bowers (Independent) 4.6%; ▌Mrs. A. R. Shivers (Independent) 1.0%

== Idaho ==
District	Incumbent	Party	First elected	Result	Candidates
Idaho 1	Compton I. White	Democratic	1932	Incumbent re-elected.	▌ ✓ Compton I. White (Democratic) 62.8%; ▌Rex T. Hensen (Republican) 37.2%
Idaho 2	D. Worth Clark	Democratic	1934	Retired to run for U.S. senator. Republican gain.	▌ ✓ Henry Dworshak (Republican) 53.6%; ▌Bert H. Miller (Democratic) 46.4%

== Illinois ==
District	Incumbent	Party	First elected	Result	Candidates
Illinois 1	Arthur W. Mitchell	Democratic	1934	Incumbent re-elected.	▌ ✓ Arthur W. Mitchell (Democratic) 53.4%; ▌William L. Dawson (Republican) 46.6%
Illinois 2	Raymond S. McKeough	Democratic	1934	Incumbent re-elected.	▌ ✓ Raymond S. McKeough (Democratic) 54.4%; ▌Noble W. Lee (Republican) 45.6%
Illinois 3	Edward A. Kelly	Democratic	1930	Incumbent re-elected.	▌ ✓ Edward A. Kelly (Democratic) 56.0%; ▌Goodwin L. Dosland (Republican) 44.0%
Illinois 4	Harry P. Beam	Democratic	1930	Incumbent re-elected.	▌ ✓ Harry P. Beam (Democratic) 76.4%; ▌Dominic M. Janec Jr. (Republican) 23.6%
Illinois 5	Adolph J. Sabath	Democratic	1906	Incumbent re-elected.	▌ ✓ Adolph J. Sabath (Democratic) 74.8%; ▌Max Price (Republican) 25.2%
Illinois 6	Thomas J. O'Brien	Democratic	1932	Incumbent retired to run for sheriff of Cook County. Democratic hold.	▌ ✓ A. F. Maciejewski (Democratic) 58.7%; ▌Robert Isham Randolph (Republican) 41.3%
Illinois 7	Leonard W. Schuetz	Democratic	1930	Incumbent re-elected.	▌ ✓ Leonard W. Schuetz (Democratic) 54.3%; ▌James C. Moreland (Republican) 45.7%
Illinois 8	Leo Kocialkowski	Democratic	1932	Incumbent re-elected.	▌ ✓ Leo Kocialkowski (Democratic) 75.3%; ▌Rena E. Pikiel (Republican) 24.7%
Illinois 9	James McAndrews	Democratic	1934	Incumbent re-elected.	▌ ✓ James McAndrews (Democratic) 52.7%; ▌Charles S. Dewey (Republican) 47.3%
Illinois 10	Ralph E. Church	Republican	1934	Incumbent re-elected.	▌ ✓ Ralph E. Church (Republican) 58.1%; ▌Joseph F. Elward (Democratic) 41.9%
Illinois 11	Chauncey W. Reed	Republican	1934	Incumbent re-elected.	▌ ✓ Chauncey W. Reed (Republican) 65.9%; ▌William J. Bossingham (Democratic) 34.1%
Illinois 12	Noah M. Mason	Republican	1936	Incumbent re-elected.	▌ ✓ Noah M. Mason (Republican) 60.7%; ▌Edward C. Hunter (Democratic) 39.3%
Illinois 13	Leo E. Allen	Republican	1932	Incumbent re-elected.	▌ ✓ Leo E. Allen (Republican) 65.6%; ▌Theodore A. Secker (Democratic) 34.4%
Illinois 14	Chester Thompson	Democratic	1932	Incumbent lost re-election. Republican gain.	▌ ✓ Anton J. Johnson (Republican) 51.5%; ▌Chester Thompson (Democratic) 48.5%
Illinois 15	Lewis L. Boyer	Democratic	1936	Incumbent lost re-election. Republican gain.	▌ ✓ Robert B. Chiperfield (Republican) 54.5%; ▌Lewis L. Boyer (Democratic) 45.5%
Illinois 16	Everett Dirksen	Republican	1932	Incumbent re-elected.	▌ ✓ Everett Dirksen (Republican) 63.5%; ▌James C. Dillon (Democratic) 36.5%
Illinois 17	Leslie C. Arends	Republican	1934	Incumbent re-elected.	▌ ✓ Leslie C. Arends (Republican) 60.9%; ▌Thomas V. Watson (Democratic) 39.1%
Illinois 18	James A. Meeks	Democratic	1932	Incumbent lost re-election. Republican gain.	▌ ✓ Jessie Sumner (Republican) 55.3%; ▌James A. Meeks (Democratic) 44.7%
Illinois 19	Hugh M. Rigney	Democratic	1936	Incumbent lost re-election. Republican gain.	▌ ✓ William H. Wheat (Republican) 51.5%; ▌Hugh M. Rigney (Democratic) 48.5%
Illinois 20	Scott W. Lucas	Democratic	1934	Retired to run for U.S. senator. Democratic hold.	▌ ✓ James M. Barnes (Democratic) 55.4%; ▌Stuart E. Pierson (Republican) 44.6%
Illinois 21	Frank W. Fries	Democratic	1936	Incumbent re-elected.	▌ ✓ Frank W. Fries (Democratic) 50.3%; ▌Frank M. Ramey (Republican) 49.7%
Illinois 22	Edwin M. Schaefer	Democratic	1932	Incumbent re-elected.	▌ ✓ Edwin M. Schaefer (Democratic) 52.4%; ▌Jesse R. Brown (Republican) 47.6%
Illinois 23	Laurence F. Arnold	Democratic	1936	Incumbent re-elected.	▌ ✓ Laurence F. Arnold (Democratic) 53.8%; ▌O. A. James (Republican) 46.2%
Illinois 24	Claude V. Parsons	Democratic	1930	Incumbent re-elected.	▌ ✓ Claude V. Parsons (Democratic) 51.1%; ▌R. R. Randolph (Republican) 48.9%
Illinois 25	Kent E. Keller	Democratic	1930	Incumbent re-elected.	▌ ✓ Kent E. Keller (Democratic) 52.3%; ▌R. G. Crisenberry (Republican) 47.7%
Illinois at-large	Lewis M. Long	Democratic	1936	Incumbent lost renomination. Democratic hold.	▌ ✓ Thomas Vernor Smith (Democratic) 25.9%; ▌ ✓ John C. Martin (Democratic) 25.7%; ▌Stephen A. Day (Republican) 24.2%; ▌Simon E. Lantz (Republican) 24.0%; ▌Harmon W. Reed (Prohibition) 0.2%; ▌A. G. Carnine (Prohibition) 0.1%
Illinois at-large	Edwin V. Champion	Democratic	1936	Incumbent retired. Democratic hold.	▌ ✓ Thomas Vernor Smith (Democratic) 25.9%; ▌ ✓ John C. Martin (Democratic) 25.7%; ▌Stephen A. Day (Republican) 24.2%; ▌Simon E. Lantz (Republican) 24.0%; ▌Harmon W. Reed (Prohibition) 0.2%; ▌A. G. Carnine (Prohibition) 0.1%

== Indiana ==
District	Incumbent	Party	First elected	Result	Candidates
Indiana 1	William T. Schulte	Democratic	1932	Incumbent re-elected.	▌ ✓ William T. Schulte (Democratic) 54.9%; ▌M. Elliott Belshaw (Republican) 45.0%; ▌Ralph Logsdon (Socialist) 0.07%
Indiana 2	Charles A. Halleck	Republican	1935 (special)	Incumbent re-elected.	▌ ✓ Charles A. Halleck (Republican) 57.8%; ▌Homer Stonebraker (Democratic) 42.2%
Indiana 3	Samuel B. Pettengill	Democratic	1930	Incumbent retired. Republican gain.	▌ ✓ Robert A. Grant (Republican) 51.0%; ▌George N. Beamer (Democratic) 49.0%
Indiana 4	James I. Farley	Democratic	1932	Incumbent lost re-election. Republican gain.	▌ ✓ George W. Gillie (Republican) 58.1%; ▌James I. Farley (Democratic) 41.9%
Indiana 5	Glenn Griswold	Democratic	1930	Incumbent lost re-election. Republican gain.	▌ ✓ Forest Harness (Republican) 54.7%; ▌Glenn Griswold (Democratic) 45.3%
Indiana 6	Virginia E. Jenckes	Democratic	1932	Incumbent lost re-election. Republican gain.	▌ ✓ Noble J. Johnson (Republican) 50.6%; ▌Virginia E. Jenckes (Democratic) 49.4%
Indiana 7	Arthur H. Greenwood	Democratic	1922	Incumbent lost re-election. Republican gain.	▌ ✓ Gerald W. Landis (Republican) 51.1%; ▌Arthur H. Greenwood (Democratic) 48.9%
Indiana 8	John W. Boehne Jr.	Democratic	1930	Incumbent re-elected.	▌ ✓ John W. Boehne Jr. (Democratic) 56.4%; ▌Charles F. Werner (Republican) 43.6%
Indiana 9	Eugene B. Crowe	Democratic	1930	Incumbent re-elected.	▌ ✓ Eugene B. Crowe (Democratic) 52.1%; ▌Clifford H. Long (Republican) 47.9%
Indiana 10	Finly Hutchinson Gray	Democratic	1932	Incumbent lost re-election. Republican gain.	▌ ✓ Raymond S. Springer (Republican) 53.5%; ▌Finly Hutchinson Gray (Democratic) 46.5%
Indiana 11	William H. Larrabee	Democratic	1930	Incumbent re-elected.	▌ ✓ William H. Larrabee (Democratic) 51.6%; ▌William O. Nelson (Republican) 48.4%
Indiana 12	Louis Ludlow	Democratic	1928	Incumbent re-elected.	▌ ✓ Louis Ludlow (Democratic) 53.7%; ▌Charles W. Jewett (Republican) 46.3%

== Iowa ==
District	Incumbent	Party	First elected	Result	Candidates
Iowa 1	Edward C. Eicher	Democratic	1932	Incumbent retired. Republican gain.	▌ ✓ Thomas E. Martin (Republican) 57.7%; ▌James P. Goffney (Democratic) 41.8%; ▌Herman O. Hansen (Farmer–Labor) 0.5%
Iowa 2	William S. Jacobsen	Democratic	1936	Incumbent re-elected.	▌ ✓ William S. Jacobsen (Democratic) 50.3%; ▌Alfred C. Mueller (Republican) 49.7%
Iowa 3	John W. Gwynne	Republican	1934	Incumbent re-elected.	▌ ✓ John W. Gwynne (Republican) 59.7%; ▌W. F. Hayes (Democratic) 39.5%; ▌Alderdyce (Farmer–Labor) 0.5%; ▌Trickey (Progressive) 0.3%
Iowa 4	Fred Biermann	Democratic	1932	Incumbent lost re-election. Republican gain.	▌ ✓ Henry O. Talle (Republican) 51.9%; ▌Fred Biermann (Democratic) 47.6%; ▌Wilbur L. Peck (Farmer–Labor) 0.6%
Iowa 5	Lloyd Thurston	Republican	1924	Retired to run for U.S. senator. Republican hold.	▌ ✓ Karl M. LeCompte (Republican) 53.9%; ▌Ruth F. Hollingshead (Democratic) 46.1%
Iowa 6	Cassius C. Dowell	Republican	1936	Incumbent re-elected.	▌ ✓ Cassius C. Dowell (Republican) 58.5%; ▌Hubert Utterback (Democratic) 40.5%; ▌Pugh (Progressive) 0.4%; ▌Hugh Fagan (Farmer–Labor) 0.4%; ▌Tennant (Prohibition) 0.1%
Iowa 7	Otha D. Wearin	Democratic	1932	Retired to run for U.S. senator. Republican gain.	▌ ✓ Ben F. Jensen (Republican) 59.0%; ▌Roger F. Warin (Democratic) 40.8%; ▌G. L. Harrison (Farmer–Labor) 0.3%
Iowa 8	Fred C. Gilchrist	Republican	1930	Incumbent re-elected.	▌ ✓ Fred C. Gilchrist (Republican) 62.5%; ▌H. Lloyd Eveland (Democratic) 36.9%; ▌Lowe (Farmer–Labor) 0.6%
Iowa 9	Vincent F. Harrington	Democratic	1936	Incumbent re-elected.	▌ ✓ Vincent F. Harrington (Democratic) 49.7%; ▌Albert F. Swanson (Republican) 49.3%; ▌Charles F. Schrunk (Farmer–Labor) 1.1%

== Kansas ==
District	Incumbent	Party	First elected	Result	Candidates
Kansas 1	William P. Lambertson	Republican	1928	Incumbent re-elected.	▌ ✓ William P. Lambertson (Republican) 60.3%; ▌H. N. Hensley (Democratic) 39.7%
Kansas 2	Ulysses Samuel Guyer	Republican	1926	Incumbent re-elected.	▌ ✓ Ulysses Samuel Guyer (Republican) 56.4%; ▌W. F. Jackson (Democratic) 43.6%
Kansas 3	Edward White Patterson	Democratic	1934	Incumbent lost re-election. Republican gain.	▌ ✓ Thomas Daniel Winter (Republican) 53.4%; ▌Edward White Patterson (Democratic) 46.6%
Kansas 4	Edward Herbert Rees	Republican	1936	Incumbent re-elected.	▌ ✓ Edward Herbert Rees (Republican) 63.1%; ▌J. Donald Coffin (Democratic) 36.9%
Kansas 5	John Mills Houston	Democratic	1934	Incumbent re-elected.	▌ ✓ John Mills Houston (Democratic) 50.3%; ▌Stanley Taylor (Republican) 49.7%
Kansas 6	Frank Carlson	Republican	1934	Incumbent re-elected.	▌ ✓ Frank Carlson (Republican) 63.4%; ▌Roy L. Hamilton (Democratic) 36.6%
Kansas 7	Clifford R. Hope	Republican	1926	Incumbent re-elected.	▌ ✓ Clifford R. Hope (Republican) 65.5%; ▌Claude E. Main (Democratic) 34.5%

== Kentucky ==
District	Incumbent	Party	First elected	Result	Candidates
Kentucky 1	Noble Jones Gregory	Democratic	1936	Incumbent re-elected.	▌ ✓ Noble Jones Gregory (Democratic) 76.0%; ▌Alvin H. Schutz (Republican) 24.0%
Kentucky 2	Beverly M. Vincent	Democratic	1937 (special)	Incumbent re-elected.	▌ ✓ Beverly M. Vincent (Democratic) 63.8%; ▌Richard H. Slack (Republican) 36.2%
Kentucky 3	Emmet O'Neal	Democratic	1934	Incumbent re-elected.	▌ ✓ Emmet O'Neal (Democratic) 61.1%; ▌Frank A. Ropke (Republican) 38.9%
Kentucky 4	Edward W. Creal	Democratic	1935 (special)	Incumbent re-elected.	▌ ✓ Edward W. Creal (Democratic) 59.2%; ▌Harry H. Wilson (Republican) 40.8%
Kentucky 5	Brent Spence	Democratic	1930	Incumbent re-elected.	▌ ✓ Brent Spence (Democratic) 68.4%; ▌Joseph Arnold Kreke (Republican) 31.6%
Kentucky 6	Virgil Chapman	Democratic	1930	Incumbent re-elected.	▌ ✓ Virgil Chapman (Democratic) 64.8%; ▌Chester D. Silvers (Republican) 34.8%; ▌Thomas Anderson Brockman (Independent) 0.4%
Kentucky 7	Andrew J. May	Democratic	1930	Incumbent re-elected.	▌ ✓ Andrew J. May (Democratic) 53.2%; ▌Hillard H. Smith (Republican) 46.8%
Kentucky 8	Joe B. Bates	Democratic	1930	Incumbent re-elected.	▌ ✓ Joe B. Bates (Democratic) 58.8%; ▌H. Clell Hayes (Republican) 41.2%
Kentucky 9	John M. Robsion	Republican	1934	Incumbent re-elected.	▌ ✓ John M. Robsion (Republican) 66.8%; ▌Bert Rowland (Democratic) 33.2%

== Louisiana ==
District	Incumbent	Party	First elected	Result	Candidates
Louisiana 1	Joachim O. Fernández	Democratic	1930	Incumbent re-elected.	▌ ✓ Joachim O. Fernández (Democratic); Uncontested
Louisiana 2	Paul H. Maloney	Democratic	1930	Incumbent re-elected.	▌ ✓ Paul H. Maloney (Democratic); Uncontested
Louisiana 3	Robert L. Mouton	Democratic	1936	Incumbent re-elected.	▌ ✓ Robert L. Mouton (Democratic); Uncontested
Louisiana 4	Overton Brooks	Democratic	1936	Incumbent re-elected.	▌ ✓ Overton Brooks (Democratic) 99.6%; ▌Ben Neal (Independent) 0.4%
Louisiana 5	Newt V. Mills	Democratic	1936	Incumbent re-elected.	▌ ✓ Newt V. Mills (Democratic); Uncontested
Louisiana 6	John K. Griffith	Democratic	1936	Incumbent re-elected.	▌ ✓ John K. Griffith (Democratic); Uncontested
Louisiana 7	René L. De Rouen	Democratic	1927 (special)	Incumbent re-elected.	▌ ✓ René L. De Rouen (Democratic); Uncontested
Louisiana 8	A. Leonard Allen	Democratic	1936	Incumbent re-elected.	▌ ✓ A. Leonard Allen (Democratic); Uncontested

== Maine ==
District	Incumbent	Party	First elected	Result	Candidates
Maine 1	James C. Oliver	Republican	1936	Incumbent re-elected.	▌ ✓ James C. Oliver (Republican) 59.0%; ▌Harold B. Emery (Democratic) 41.0%
Maine 2	Clyde H. Smith	Republican	1936	Incumbent re-elected.	▌ ✓ Clyde H. Smith (Republican) 54.3%; ▌F. Harold Dubord (Democratic) 45.7%
Maine 3	Owen Brewster	Republican	1934	Incumbent re-elected.	▌ ✓ Owen Brewster (Republican) 63.4%; ▌Melvin P. Roberts (Democratic) 36.6%

== Maryland ==
District	Incumbent	Party	First elected	Result	Candidates
Maryland 1	T. Alan Goldsborough	Democratic	1920	Incumbent re-elected.	▌ ✓ T. Alan Goldsborough (Democratic) 62.8%; ▌Charles H. Gibson (Republican) 37.2%
Maryland 2	William P. Cole Jr.	Democratic	1930	Incumbent re-elected.	▌ ✓ William P. Cole Jr. (Democratic) 66.3%; ▌Irving H. Mezger (Republican) 32.5%; ▌Eric Arlt (Union) 1.2%
Maryland 3	Vincent L. Palmisano	Democratic	1926	Incumbent lost renomination. Democratic hold.	▌ ✓ Thomas D'Alesandro Jr. (Democratic) 56.6%; ▌John A. Janetzke Jr. (Republican) 43.4%
Maryland 4	Ambrose Jerome Kennedy	Democratic	1932	Incumbent re-elected.	▌ ✓ Ambrose Jerome Kennedy (Democratic) 50.2%; ▌Daniel Ellison (Republican) 49.8%
Maryland 5	Stephen W. Gambrill	Democratic	1924	Incumbent re-elected.	▌ ✓ Stephen W. Gambrill (Democratic) 68.0%; ▌A. Kingsley Love (Republican) 28.6%; ▌John N. Torvestad (Progressive) 2.0%; ▌David L. Elliott (Independent) 1.4%
Maryland 6	David John Lewis	Democratic	1930	Retired to run for U.S. senator. Democratic hold.	▌ ✓ William D. Byron (Democratic) 50.8%; ▌A. Charles Stewart (Republican) 49.2%

== Massachusetts ==
District	Incumbent	Party	First elected	Result	Candidates
Massachusetts 1	Allen T. Treadway	Republican	1912	Incumbent re-elected.	▌ ✓ Allen T. Treadway (Republican) 58.8%; ▌Owen Johnson (Democratic) 41.2%
Massachusetts 2	Charles R. Clason	Republican	1936	Incumbent re-elected.	▌ ✓ Charles R. Clason (Republican) 61.9%; ▌James F. Egan (Democratic) 38.1%
Massachusetts 3	Joseph E. Casey	Democratic	1934	Incumbent re-elected.	▌ ✓ Joseph E. Casey (Democratic) 51.8%; ▌J. Walton Tuttle (Republican) 48.2%
Massachusetts 4	Pehr G. Holmes	Republican	1930	Incumbent re-elected.	▌ ✓ Pehr G. Holmes (Republican) 54.1%; ▌Edward A. Ryan (Democratic) 45.9%
Massachusetts 5	Edith Nourse Rogers	Republican	1925 (special)	Incumbent re-elected.	▌ ✓ Edith Nourse Rogers (Republican) 74.8%; ▌Francis J. Roane (Democratic) 25.2%
Massachusetts 6	George J. Bates	Republican	1936	Incumbent re-elected.	▌ ✓ George J. Bates (Republican) 74.7%; ▌James D. Burns (Democratic) 25.3%
Massachusetts 7	Lawrence J. Connery	Democratic	1937 (special)	Incumbent re-elected.	▌ ✓ Lawrence J. Connery (Democratic) 63.8%; ▌George W. Eastman (Republican) 36.2%
Massachusetts 8	Arthur D. Healey	Democratic	1932	Incumbent re-elected.	▌ ✓ Arthur D. Healey (Democratic) 55.1%; ▌Rufus Bond (Republican) 44.9%
Massachusetts 9	Robert Luce	Republican	1936	Incumbent re-elected.	▌ ✓ Robert Luce (Republican) 50.7%; ▌Thomas H. Eliot (Democratic) 49.3%
Massachusetts 10	George H. Tinkham	Republican	1914	Incumbent re-elected.	▌ ✓ George H. Tinkham (Republican) 64.4%; ▌Martin J. Kelly (Democratic) 35.6%
Massachusetts 11	Thomas A. Flaherty	Democratic	1937 (special)	Incumbent re-elected.	▌ ✓ Thomas A. Flaherty (Democratic); Uncontested
Massachusetts 12	John W. McCormack	Democratic	1928	Incumbent re-elected.	▌ ✓ John William McCormack (Democratic) 77.1%; ▌Henry J. Allen (Republican) 22.9%
Massachusetts 13	Richard B. Wigglesworth	Republican	1928	Incumbent re-elected.	▌ ✓ Richard B. Wigglesworth (Republican) 68.4%; ▌Andrew T. Clancy (Democratic) 31.6%
Massachusetts 14	Joseph W. Martin Jr.	Republican	1924	Incumbent re-elected.	▌ ✓ Joseph William Martin Jr. (Republican) 58.7%; ▌Lawrence J. Bresnahan (Democratic) 40.5%; ▌Mortimer A. Sullivan (Progressive Labor) 0.8%
Massachusetts 15	Charles L. Gifford	Republican	1922	Incumbent re-elected.	▌ ✓ Charles L. Gifford (Republican) 59.0%; ▌John D. W. Bodfish (Democratic) 41.0%

== Michigan ==
District	Incumbent	Party	First elected	Result	Candidates
Michigan 1	George G. Sadowski	Democratic	1932	Incumbent lost renomination. Democratic hold.	▌ ✓ Rudolph G. Tenerowicz (Democratic) 80.4%; ▌Charles A. Roxborough (Republican) 18.8%; ▌Ben Fischer (Socialist) 0.4%; ▌John Johns (Const. Dem.) 0.3%; ▌Theos A. Grove (Socialist Labor) 0.07%
Michigan 2	Earl C. Michener	Republican	1934	Incumbent re-elected.	▌ ✓ Earl C. Michener (Republican) 64.4%; ▌Walter C. Averill, Jr. (Democratic) 35.5%; ▌Florence Howard (Commonwealth) 0.04%; ▌Edmund T. Taylor (Socialist Labor) 0.03%
Michigan 3	Paul W. Shafer	Republican	1936	Incumbent re-elected.	▌ ✓ Paul W. Shafer (Republican) 66.0%; ▌Gordon L. Stewart (Democratic) 33.9%; ▌Duly McCone (Commonwealth) 0.05%
Michigan 4	Clare E. Hoffman	Republican	1934	Incumbent re-elected.	▌ ✓ Clare E. Hoffman (Republican) 59.2%; ▌Felix Racette (Democratic) 40.8%
Michigan 5	Carl E. Mapes	Republican	1912	Incumbent re-elected.	▌ ✓ Carl E. Mapes (Republican) 59.1%; ▌Tunis Johnson (Democratic) 40.9%
Michigan 6	Andrew J. Transue	Democratic	1936	Incumbent lost re-election. Republican gain.	▌ ✓ William W. Blackney (Republican) 55.0%; ▌Andrew J. Transue (Democratic) 45.0%; ▌Arthur H. McMaster (Commonwealth) 0.02%
Michigan 7	Jesse P. Wolcott	Republican	1930	Incumbent re-elected.	▌ ✓ Jesse P. Wolcott (Republican) 69.0%; ▌Charles F. Mann (Democratic) 31.0%
Michigan 8	Fred L. Crawford	Republican	1934	Incumbent re-elected.	▌ ✓ Fred L. Crawford (Republican) 58.7%; ▌Louis C. Schwinger (Democratic) 41.3%
Michigan 9	Albert J. Engel	Republican	1934	Incumbent re-elected.	▌ ✓ Albert J. Engel (Republican) 58.2%; ▌Noel P. Fox (Democratic) 41.8%
Michigan 10	Roy O. Woodruff	Republican	1920	Incumbent re-elected.	▌ ✓ Roy O. Woodruff (Republican) 66.3%; ▌Harold C. Bellows (Democratic) 33.5%; ▌Charles B. Asselin (Const. Dem.) 0.2%
Michigan 11	John F. Luecke	Democratic	1936	Incumbent lost re-election. Republican gain.	▌ ✓ Frederick Van Ness Bradley (Republican) 51.4%; ▌John F. Luecke (Democratic) 48.6%
Michigan 12	Frank Eugene Hook	Democratic	1934	Incumbent re-elected.	▌ ✓ Frank Eugene Hook (Democratic) 51.7%; ▌John B. Bennett (Republican) 48.3%
Michigan 13	George D. O'Brien	Democratic	1936	Incumbent lost re-election. Republican gain.	▌ ✓ Clarence J. McLeod (Republican) 50.6%; ▌George D. O'Brien (Democratic) 48.9%; ▌Louis Busker (Socialist) 0.2%; ▌Edward A. Carey (Const. Dem.) 0.2%; ▌Theodore Gramaticoff (Socialist Labor) 0.05%
Michigan 14	Louis C. Rabaut	Democratic	1934	Incumbent re-elected.	▌ ✓ Louis C. Rabaut (Democratic) 57.6%; ▌O. Z. Ide (Republican) 42.1%; ▌Loren Walters (Socialist) 0.2%; ▌Stanley Romanski (Const. Dem.) 0.1%; ▌John Vonica (Socialist Labor) 0.02%
Michigan 15	John Dingell Sr.	Democratic	1932	Incumbent re-elected.	▌ ✓ John Dingell Sr. (Democratic) 54.0%; ▌Archie C. Fraser (Republican) 45.6%; ▌Francis King (Socialist) 0.2%; ▌Francis J. McDonald (Const. Dem.) 0.2%; ▌Edith Walzel (Socialist Labor) 0.04%
Michigan 16	John Lesinski Sr.	Democratic	1932	Incumbent re-elected.	▌ ✓ John Lesinski Sr. (Democratic) 55.1%; ▌John L. Carey (Republican) 44.5%; ▌J. G. Betz (Socialist) 0.2%; ▌Leonard R. Kolpacke (Const. Dem.) 0.2%; ▌Joseph Vers (Socialist) 0.08%
Michigan 17	George A. Dondero	Republican	1932	Incumbent re-elected.	▌ ✓ George A. Dondero (Republican) 61.4%; ▌Samuel G. Backus (Democratic) 38.3%; ▌Walter Allmendiger (Socialist) 0.2%; ▌W. Clifford Bentley (Socialist Labor) 0.09%

== Minnesota ==
District	Incumbent	Party	First elected	Result	Candidates
Minnesota 1	August H. Andresen	Republican	1934	Incumbent re-elected.	▌ ✓ August H. Andresen (Republican) 64.9%; ▌Ray G. Moonan (Democratic) 35.1%
Minnesota 2	Elmer Ryan	Democratic	1934	Incumbent re-elected.	▌ ✓ Elmer Ryan (Democratic) 43.6%; ▌Joseph P. O'Hara (Republican) 35.9%; ▌C. F. Gaarenstroom (Farmer–Labor) 20.5%
Minnesota 3	Henry Teigan	Farmer–Labor	1936	Incumbent lost re-election. Republican gain.	▌ ✓ John G. Alexander (Republican) 45.3%; ▌Henry Teigan (Farmer–Labor) 42.8%; ▌Martin A. Hogan (Democratic) 11.9%
Minnesota 4	Melvin Maas	Republican	1934	Incumbent re-elected.	▌ ✓ Melvin Maas (Republican) 53.1%; ▌Howard Y. Williams (Farmer–Labor) 35.8%; ▌A. B. C. Doherty (Democratic) 11.1%
Minnesota 5	Dewey Johnson	Farmer–Labor	1936	Incumbent lost re-election. Republican gain.	▌ ✓ Oscar Youngdahl (Republican) 54.7%; ▌Dewey Johnson (Farmer–Labor) 36.8%; ▌John L. Gleason (Democratic) 8.6%
Minnesota 6	Harold Knutson	Republican	1934	Incumbent re-elected.	▌ ✓ Harold Knutson (Republican) 63.2%; ▌Harry W. Christianson (Farmer–Labor) 28.5%; ▌Harold F. Deering (Democratic) 8.3%
Minnesota 7	Paul John Kvale	Farmer–Labor	1929 (special)	Incumbent lost re-election. Republican gain.	▌ ✓ H. Carl Andersen (Republican) 42.6%; ▌Paul John Kvale (Farmer–Labor) 36.7%; ▌J. L. O'Connor (Democratic) 16.7%; ▌Albert S. Falk (Independent) 4.1%
Minnesota 8	John Bernard	Farmer–Labor	1936	Incumbent lost re-election. Republican gain.	▌ ✓ William Alvin Pittenger (Republican) 51.8%; ▌John Bernard (Farmer–Labor) 41.4%; ▌Merle J. McKeon (Democratic) 6.8%
Minnesota 9	Rich T. Buckler	Farmer–Labor	1934	Incumbent re-elected.	▌ ✓ Rich T. Buckler (Farmer–Labor) 42.0%; ▌Ole O. Sageng (Republican) 38.5%; ▌Martin O. Brandon (Democratic) 19.5%

== Mississippi ==
District	Incumbent	Party	First elected	Result	Candidates
Mississippi 1	John E. Rankin	Democratic	1920	Incumbent re-elected.	▌ ✓ John E. Rankin (Democratic); Uncontested
Mississippi 2	Wall Doxey	Democratic	1928	Incumbent re-elected.	▌ ✓ Wall Doxey (Democratic); Uncontested
Mississippi 3	William Madison Whittington	Democratic	1924	Incumbent re-elected.	▌ ✓ William Madison Whittington (Democratic); Uncontested
Mississippi 4	Aaron L. Ford	Democratic	1934	Incumbent re-elected.	▌ ✓ Aaron L. Ford (Democratic); Uncontested
Mississippi 5	Ross A. Collins	Democratic	1936	Incumbent re-elected.	▌ ✓ Ross A. Collins (Democratic); Uncontested
Mississippi 6	William M. Colmer	Democratic	1932	Incumbent re-elected.	▌ ✓ William M. Colmer (Democratic); Uncontested
Mississippi 7	Dan R. McGehee	Democratic	1934	Incumbent re-elected.	▌ ✓ Dan R. McGehee (Democratic); Uncontested

== Missouri ==
District	Incumbent	Party	First elected	Result	Candidates
Missouri 1	Milton A. Romjue	Democratic	1922	Incumbent re-elected.	▌ ✓ Milton A. Romjue (Democratic) 54.7%; ▌James Grover Morgan (Republican) 45.2%; ▌R. D. Morrison (Socialist) 0.06%
Missouri 2	William L. Nelson	Democratic	1934	Incumbent re-elected.	▌ ✓ William L. Nelson (Democratic) 57.9%; ▌Mrs. George B. Simmons (Republican) 42.0%; ▌H. V. Ousley (Socialist) 0.05%
Missouri 3	Richard M. Duncan	Democratic	1932	Incumbent re-elected.	▌ ✓ Richard M. Duncan (Democratic) 55.3%; ▌Fred Maughmer (Republican) 44.7%
Missouri 4	C. Jasper Bell	Democratic	1934	Incumbent re-elected.	▌ ✓ C. Jasper Bell (Democratic) 80.4%; ▌George E. Kimball (Republican) 19.6%; ▌W. F. Rinck (Socialist) 0.01%; ▌Henke (Socialist Labor) 0.01%
Missouri 5	Joe Shannon	Democratic	1930	Incumbent re-elected.	▌ ✓ Joe Shannon (Democratic) 81.0%; ▌Leslie J. Lyons (Republican) 19.0%; ▌Hiltner (Socialist Labor) 0.001%
Missouri 6	Reuben T. Wood	Democratic	1932	Incumbent re-elected.	▌ ✓ Reuben T. Wood (Democratic) 50.3%; ▌Phil A. Bennett (Republican) 49.7%; ▌Umstead (Socialist Labor) 0.01%
Missouri 7	Dewey Short	Republican	1934	Incumbent re-elected.	▌ ✓ Dewey Short (Republican) 56.3%; ▌Frank H. Lee (Democratic) 43.6%; ▌Louise Carpenter (Socialist) 0.1%
Missouri 8	Clyde Williams	Democratic	1930	Incumbent re-elected.	▌ ✓ Clyde Williams (Democratic) 55.3%; ▌Homer S. Cotton (Republican) 44.7%; ▌Doyen (Socialist Labor) 0.02%
Missouri 9	Clarence Cannon	Democratic	1922	Incumbent re-elected.	▌ ✓ Clarence Cannon (Democratic) 60.5%; ▌F. B. Meyer (Republican) 39.4%; ▌Harry Shumaker (Socialist) 0.07%
Missouri 10	Orville Zimmerman	Democratic	1934	Incumbent re-elected.	▌ ✓ Orville Zimmerman (Democratic) 58.9%; ▌Ralph Hutchison (Republican) 41.0%; ▌Frank Jones (Socialist) 0.08%
Missouri 11	Thomas C. Hennings Jr.	Democratic	1934	Incumbent re-elected.	▌ ✓ Thomas C. Hennings Jr. (Democratic) 61.8%; ▌William E. Buder (Republican) 37.9%; ▌Paul W. Preisler (Socialist) 0.2%; ▌Wagoner (Socialist Labor) 0.06%
Missouri 12	Charles Arthur Anderson	Democratic	1936	Incumbent re-elected.	▌ ✓ Charles Arthur Anderson (Democratic) 52.0%; ▌Russell J. Horsefield (Republican) 47.6%; ▌Kovaka (Socialist) 0.4%; ▌Genck (Socialist Labor) 0.06%
Missouri 13	John J. Cochran	Democratic	1926	Incumbent re-elected.	▌ ✓ John J. Cochran (Democratic) 69.0%; ▌William Gray (Republican) 30.9%; ▌A. W. Nichols (Socialist) 0.1%; ▌Kochendorfer (Socialist Labor) 0.03%

== Montana ==
District	Incumbent	Party	First elected	Result	Candidates
Montana 1	Jerry J. O'Connell	Democratic	1936	Incumbent lost re-election. Republican gain.	▌ ✓ Jacob Thorkelson (Republican) 54.4%; ▌Jerry J. O'Connell (Democratic) 45.6%
Montana 2	James F. O'Connor	Democratic	1936	Incumbent re-elected.	▌ ✓ James F. O'Connor (Democratic) 53.8%; ▌W. C. Husband (Republican) 46.2%

== Nebraska ==
District	Incumbent	Party	First elected	Result	Candidates
Nebraska 1	Henry Carl Luckey	Democratic	1934	Incumbent lost re-election. Republican gain.	▌ ✓ George H. Heinke (Republican) 47.0%; ▌Henry Carl Luckey (Democratic) 46.6%; ▌Catherine F. McGerr (Independent) 6.4%
Nebraska 2	Charles F. McLaughlin	Democratic	1934	Incumbent re-elected.	▌ ✓ Charles F. McLaughlin (Democratic) 57.3%; ▌M. F. Mulvaney (Republican) 39.9%; ▌James Levi Nelson (Independent) 2.7%
Nebraska 3	Karl Stefan	Republican	1934	Incumbent re-elected.	▌ ✓ Karl Stefan (Republican) 75.3%; ▌Edgar Howard (Democratic) 24.7%
Nebraska 4	Charles Gustav Binderup	Democratic	1934	Incumbent lost re-election. Republican gain.	▌ ✓ Carl Curtis (Republican) 58.2%; ▌Charles Gustav Binderup (Democratic) 41.8%
Nebraska 5	Harry B. Coffee	Democratic	1934	Incumbent re-elected.	▌ ✓ Harry B. Coffee (Democratic) 62.4%; ▌William E. Shuman (Republican) 34.1%; ▌Milford Flood (Independent) 3.5%

== Nevada ==
District	Incumbent	Party	First elected	Result	Candidates
Nevada at-large	James G. Scrugham	Democratic	1932	Incumbent re-elected.	▌ ✓ James G. Scrugham (Democratic) 66.4%; ▌Harry E. Stewart (Republican) 33.6%

== New Hampshire ==
District	Incumbent	Party	First elected	Result	Candidates
New Hampshire 1	Alphonse Roy	Democratic	1936	Incumbent lost re-election. Republican gain.	▌ ✓ Arthur B. Jenks (Republican) 53.9%; ▌Alphonse Roy (Democratic) 46.1%
New Hampshire 2	Charles W. Tobey	Republican	1932	Retired to run for U.S. senator. Republican hold.	▌ ✓ Foster Waterman Stearns (Republican) 59.1%; ▌Alvin A. Lucier (Democratic) 40.9%

== New Jersey ==
District	Incumbent	Party	First elected	Result	Candidates
New Jersey 1	Charles A. Wolverton	Republican	1926	Incumbent re-elected.	▌ ✓ Charles A. Wolverton (Republican) 62.0%; ▌Thomas M. Madden (Democratic) 37.5%; ▌Samuel Josephson (Socialist) 0.3%; ▌Elizabeth S. Aceto (Prohibition) 0.2%; ▌John F. Norman (Communist) 0.06%
New Jersey 2	Elmer H. Wene	Democratic	1936	Incumbent lost re-election. Republican gain.	▌ ✓ Walter S. Jeffries (Republican) 50.6%; ▌Elmer H. Wene (Democratic) 49.1%; ▌Isaac Stalberg (Roosevelt Ind.) 0.2%; ▌Margaret V. Moody (Prohibition) 0.08%; ▌Anthon B. Ferretti (Peoples) 0.04%; ▌Frank B. Hubin (Roosevelt Ind.) 0.02%
New Jersey 3	William H. Sutphin	Democratic	1930	Incumbent re-elected.	▌ ✓ William H. Sutphin (Democratic) 50.5%; ▌James K. Allerdice (Republican) 49.5%
New Jersey 4	D. Lane Powers	Republican	1932	Incumbent re-elected.	▌ ✓ D. Lane Powers (Republican) 61.3%; ▌Richard J. Hughes (Democratic) 38.4%; ▌William C. Kauffman (Socialist) 0.1%; ▌Samuel E. Golder (Prohibition) 0.1%
New Jersey 5	Charles A. Eaton	Republican	1924	Incumbent re-elected.	▌ ✓ Charles A. Eaton (Republican) 56.7%; ▌Franklin W. Rice (Democratic) 43.2%; ▌Jeremiah Morse (Prohibition) 0.1%
New Jersey 6	Donald H. McLean	Republican	1932	Incumbent re-elected.	▌ ✓ Donald H. McLean (Republican) 61.4%; ▌Richard F. Green (Democratic) 37.4%; ▌Marion Douglas (Socialist) 1.0%; ▌Lillian Riker (Prohibition) 0.2%
New Jersey 7	J. Parnell Thomas	Republican	1936	Incumbent re-elected.	▌ ✓ J. Parnell Thomas (Republican) 64.0%; ▌Edward W. Wildrick (Democratic) 35.6%; ▌John L. Humbert (Farmer–Labor) 0.4%
New Jersey 8	George N. Seger	Republican	1922	Incumbent re-elected.	▌ ✓ George N. Seger (Republican) 59.2%; ▌Fred Hoelscher (Democratic) 40.1%; ▌Manuel Cantor (Communist) 0.3%; ▌Jacob H. Schmitter (Socialist Labor) 0.2%; ▌Arthur W. Collard (Prohibition) 0.08%
New Jersey 9	Edward A. Kenney	Democratic	1932	Incumbent died. Republican gain.	▌ ✓ Frank C. Osmers Jr. (Republican) 59.3%; ▌Vincent Clausen (Democratic) 39.9%; ▌Elizabeth Jane Kenney (Independent) 0.5%; ▌William F. Klemm (Ind. Progressive) 0.3%
New Jersey 10	Fred A. Hartley Jr.	Republican	1928	Incumbent re-elected.	▌ ✓ Fred A. Hartley Jr. (Republican) 55.6%; ▌Lindsay H. Rudd (Democratic) 39.5%; ▌Nicholas Fiore (Independent) 4.4%; ▌Rose Risk (Communist) 0.5%
New Jersey 11	Edward L. O'Neill	Democratic	1936	Incumbent lost re-election. Republican gain.	▌ ✓ Albert L. Vreeland (Republican) 50.3%; ▌Edward L. O'Neill (Democratic) 44.8%; ▌J. Roosevelt Womble (Liberal) 3.0%; ▌Reuben Plaskett (Socialist Workers) 0.7%; ▌Lillie Brewer (Communist) 0.6%; ▌John C. Privitera (Independent) 0.6%
New Jersey 12	Frank W. Towey Jr.	Democratic	1936	Incumbent lost re-election. Republican gain.	▌ ✓ Robert Kean (Republican) 55.0%; ▌Frank W. Towey Jr. (Democratic) 41.3%; ▌Irving Rosenberg (Socialist Workers) 2.3%; ▌Morris Friendal (Communist) 0.9%; ▌Rubye Smith (Socialist) 0.5%
New Jersey 13	Mary Teresa Norton	Democratic	1924	Incumbent re-elected.	▌ ✓ Mary Teresa Norton (Democratic) 79.8%; ▌T. Burton Coyle (Republican) 20.1%; ▌Jay Anyon (Communist) 0.1%
New Jersey 14	Edward J. Hart	Democratic	1934	Incumbent re-elected.	▌ ✓ Edward J. Hart (Democratic) 78.6%; ▌Henry T. Stuhr (Republican) 21.1%; ▌G. Darrell O'Neill (Socialist) 0.3%

== New Mexico ==
District	Incumbent	Party	First elected	Result	Candidates
New Mexico at-large	John J. Dempsey	Democratic	1934	Incumbent re-elected.	▌ ✓ John J. Dempsey (Democratic) 58.4%; ▌Pearce C. Rodney (Republican) 41.4%; ▌E. W. Fawkes (Citizens) 0.2%

== New York ==
District	Incumbent	Party	First elected	Result	Candidates
New York 1	Robert L. Bacon	Republican	1922	Incumbent died. Republican hold.	▌ ✓ Leonard W. Hall (Republican) 63.0%; ▌John F. Kiernan (Democratic) 34.0%; ▌Pierrepont E. Twitchell (American Labor) 2.7%; ▌Robert Koeppicus (Socialist) 0.3%
New York 2	William Bernard Barry	Democratic	1935 (special)	Incumbent re-elected.	▌ ✓ William Bernard Barry (Democratic) 67.6%; ▌George Archinal (Republican) 31.5%; ▌John Petrone (Socialist) 0.9%
New York 3	Joseph L. Pfeifer	Democratic	1934	Incumbent re-elected.	▌ ✓ Joseph L. Pfeifer (Democratic) 64.8%; ▌Philip Tirone (Republican) 23.3%; ▌Bernard Kleban (American Labor) 11.2%; ▌David Breslow (Socialist) 0.8%
New York 4	Thomas H. Cullen	Democratic	1918	Incumbent re-elected.	▌ ✓ Thomas H. Cullen (Democratic) 74.5%; ▌Edwin R. Kaprat (Republican) 24.8%; ▌David M. Cory (Socialist) 0.7%
New York 5	Marcellus H. Evans	Democratic	1934	Incumbent re-elected.	▌ ✓ Marcellus H. Evans (Democratic) 58.3%; ▌Francis H. Warland (Republican) 30.1%; ▌Joseph Dermody (American Labor) 10.7%; ▌Sam Baron (Socialist) 0.9%
New York 6	Andrew Lawrence Somers	Democratic	1924	Incumbent re-elected.	▌ ✓ Andrew Lawrence Somers (Democratic) 52.0%; ▌Gustav Drews (Republican) 46.3%; ▌Jacob Axelrod (Socialist) 1.6%
New York 7	John J. Delaney	Democratic	1931 (special)	Incumbent re-elected.	▌ ✓ John J. Delaney (Democratic) 59.6%; ▌John J. Blust (Republican) 19.8%; ▌Bernard Reswick (American Labor) 19.4%; ▌Joseph G. Glass (Socialist) 1.1%
New York 8	Donald L. O'Toole	Democratic	1936	Incumbent re-elected.	▌ ✓ Donald L. O'Toole (Democratic) 54.1%; ▌Dorothy J. Bellanca (Republican) 44.7%; ▌Alfred S. Belskin (Socialist) 1.2%
New York 9	Eugene James Keogh	Democratic	1936	Incumbent re-elected.	▌ ✓ Eugene James Keogh (Democratic) 54.1%; ▌Nelson S. Kirk (Republican) 34.0%; ▌Spencer K. Binyon (American Labor) 11.0%; ▌Simon L. Goldbloom (Communist) 0.9%
New York 10	Emanuel Celler	Democratic	1922	Incumbent re-elected.	▌ ✓ Emanuel Celler (Democratic) 73.5%; ▌Arthur H. J. Macmullen (Republican) 24.9%; ▌Jack Altman (Socialist) 1.6%
New York 11	James A. O'Leary	Democratic	1934	Incumbent re-elected.	▌ ✓ James A. O'Leary (Democratic) 58.9%; ▌Percy C. Ryder (Republican) 33.9%; ▌John V. Murphy (American Labor) 6.6%; ▌Ernest K. Barnard (Socialist) 0.6%
New York 12	Samuel Dickstein	Democratic	1922	Incumbent re-elected.	▌ ✓ Samuel Dickstein (Democratic) 89.0%; ▌Hyman Hecht (Republican) 9.6%; ▌Mary Fox (Socialist) 1.4%
New York 13	Christopher D. Sullivan	Democratic	1916	Incumbent re-elected.	▌ ✓ Christopher D. Sullivan (Democratic) 63.8%; ▌John Rosenberg (Republican) 18.2%; ▌Eugene P. Connolly (American Labor) 17.0%; ▌Joel Seidman (Socialist) 1.0%
New York 14	William I. Sirovich	Democratic	1926	Incumbent re-elected.	▌ ✓ William I. Sirovich (Democratic) 68.4%; ▌Maurice Wahl (Republican) 30.0%; ▌Daniel Glendenin (Socialist) 1.6%
New York 15	John J. Boylan	Democratic	1922	Incumbent died. Democratic hold.	▌ ✓ Michael J. Kennedy (Democratic) 67.3%; ▌John Kane Jr. (Republican) 22.6%; ▌Daniel L. McDonough (American Labor) 9.4%; ▌Meriweather Stuart (Socialist) 0.7%
New York 16	John J. O'Connor	Democratic	1923 (special)	Incumbent lost renomination and re-election as Republican. Democratic hold.	▌ ✓ James H. Fay (Democratic) 52.1%; ▌John J. O'Connor (Republican) 46.9%; ▌McAlister Coleman (Socialist) 1.1%
New York 17	Bruce Fairchild Barton	Republican	1937 (special)	Incumbent re-elected.	▌ ✓ Bruce Fairchild Barton (Republican) 55.0%; ▌Walter H. Liebman (Democratic) 36.2%; ▌George Backer (American Labor) 8.3%; ▌Clinton W. Keyes (Socialist) 0.4%
New York 18	Martin J. Kennedy	Democratic	1930	Incumbent re-elected.	▌ ✓ Martin J. Kennedy (Democratic) 60.8%; ▌Raymond S. Fanning (Republican) 30.5%; ▌Martin C. Kyne (American Labor) 8.1%; ▌Sidonia Fried Sugar (Socialist) 0.7%
New York 19	Sol Bloom	Democratic	1923 (special)	Incumbent re-elected.	▌ ✓ Sol Bloom (Democratic) 53.3%; ▌Robert P. Levis (Republican) 28.1%; ▌Joseph Schlossberg (American Labor) 18.6%
New York 20	James J. Lanzetta	Democratic	1936	Incumbent lost re-election. American Labor gain.	▌ ✓ Vito Marcantonio (American Labor) 59.7%; ▌James J. Lanzetta (Democratic) 39.0%; ▌Murray Cross (Socialist) 1.3%
New York 21	Joseph A. Gavagan	Democratic	1929 (special)	Incumbent re-elected.	▌ ✓ Joseph A. Gavagan (Democratic) 69.5%; ▌Lorenzo H. King (Republican) 29.6%; ▌Frank Crosswaith (Socialist) 1.0%
New York 22	Edward W. Curley	Democratic	1935 (special)	Incumbent re-elected.	▌ ✓ Edward W. Curley (Democratic) 64.5%; ▌Arthur D. Fisher (Republican) 23.0%; ▌Thomas C. O'Leary (American Labor) 11.6%; ▌Aaron Levenstein (Socialist) 0.9%
New York 23	Charles A. Buckley	Democratic	1934	Incumbent re-elected.	▌ ✓ Charles A. Buckley (Democratic) 50.8%; ▌Isidore Nagler (American Labor) 28.4%; ▌Robert H. Brennen (Republican) 20.8%
New York 24	James M. Fitzpatrick	Democratic	1926	Incumbent re-elected.	▌ ✓ James M. Fitzpatrick (Democratic) 48.7%; ▌Louis Goldrich (Republican) 33.2%; ▌Bartholomew F. Murphy (American Labor) 17.1%; ▌Fred Harwood (Socialist) 1.0%
New York 25	Ralph A. Gamble	Republican	1937 (special)	Incumbent re-elected.	▌ ✓ Ralph A. Gamble (Republican) 64.9%; ▌Homer A. Stebbins (Democratic) 32.0%; ▌Michael Cimbalo (American Labor) 2.8%; ▌Leonard Bright (Socialist) 0.4%
New York 26	Hamilton Fish III	Republican	1920	Incumbent re-elected.	▌ ✓ Hamilton Fish III (Republican) 64.3%; ▌Ben Martin (Democratic) 35.0%; ▌Edward J. Bowen (Freedom) 0.5%; ▌Hans Peters (Socialist) 0.3%
New York 27	Lewis K. Rockefeller	Republican	1937 (special)	Incumbent re-elected.	▌ ✓ Lewis K. Rockefeller (Republican) 61.0%; ▌George W. Markey (Democratic) 39.0%
New York 28	William T. Byrne	Democratic	1936	Incumbent re-elected.	▌ ✓ William T. Byrne (Democratic) 60.4%; ▌William B. Cornell (Republican) 37.5%; ▌Edward J. Addy (American Labor) 1.9%; ▌Frank A. Andrae (Socialist) 0.1%
New York 29	E. Harold Cluett	Republican	1936	Incumbent re-elected.	▌ ✓ E. Harold Cluett (Republican) 65.0%; ▌Harry M. Brooks (Democratic) 34.7%; ▌Coleman B. Cheney (Socialist) 0.2%
New York 30	Frank Crowther	Republican	1918	Incumbent re-elected.	▌ ✓ Frank Crowther (Republican) 60.1%; ▌C. Dorothea Greene (Democratic) 39.4%; ▌Herbert M. Poller (Socialist) 0.5%
New York 31	Bertrand Snell	Republican	1915 (special)	Incumbent retired. Republican hold.	▌ ✓ Wallace E. Pierce (Republican) 64.1%; ▌George C. Owens (Democratic) 25.7%; ▌Jesse W. Williams (Townsend) 9.9%; ▌Forrest Wallace (Socialist) 0.3%
New York 32	Francis D. Culkin	Republican	1928	Incumbent re-elected.	▌ ✓ Francis D. Culkin (Republican) 75.5%; ▌Virginia A. Spencer (Democratic) 24.3%; ▌Orley N. Tooley (Socialist) 0.2%
New York 33	Fred J. Douglas	Republican	1936	Incumbent re-elected.	▌ ✓ Fred J. Douglas (Republican) 61.2%; ▌Ralph A. Peters (Democratic) 35.7%; ▌Stanley C. Walewski (American Labor) 2.8%; ▌Albert R. Tully (Socialist) 0.3%
New York 34	Bert Lord	Republican	1934	Incumbent re-elected.	▌ ✓ Bert Lord (Republican) 65.3%; ▌John V. Johnson (Democratic) 34.4%; ▌Merle A. Wilson (Socialist) 0.3%
New York 35	Clarence E. Hancock	Republican	1927 (special)	Incumbent re-elected.	▌ ✓ Clarence E. Hancock (Republican) 64.1%; ▌Caleb C. Brown, Jr. (Democratic) 35.6%; ▌Thomas P. Shallcross (Socialist) 0.3%
New York 36	John Taber	Republican	1922	Incumbent re-elected.	▌ ✓ John Taber (Republican) 55.2%; ▌George F. Davie (Democratic) 23.1%; ▌Charles P. Russell (American Labor) 21.3%; ▌Walter O'Hagen (Socialist) 0.5%
New York 37	W. Sterling Cole	Republican	1934	Incumbent re-elected.	▌ ✓ W. Sterling Cole (Republican) 60.5%; ▌David Moses (Democratic) 39.1%; ▌Trevor Teele (Socialist) 0.4%
New York 38	George Bradshaw Kelly	Democratic	1936	Incumbent lost re-election. Republican gain.	▌ ✓ Joseph J. O'Brien (Republican) 55.8%; ▌George Bradshaw Kelly (Democratic) 43.7%; ▌James Oakes (Socialist) 0.5%
New York 39	James W. Wadsworth Jr.	Republican	1932	Incumbent re-elected.	▌ ✓ James W. Wadsworth Jr. (Republican) 65.8%; ▌J. Frank Gilligan (Democratic) 28.4%; ▌Edward J. Wagner (American Labor) 5.5%; ▌Clair Walbridge (Socialist) 0.3%
New York 40	Walter G. Andrews	Republican	1930	Incumbent re-elected.	▌ ✓ Walter G. Andrews (Republican) 62.6%; ▌John L. Beyer (Democratic) 34.4%; ▌August Hein (American Labor) 2.6%; ▌George Brickner (Socialist) 0.4%
New York 41	Alfred F. Beiter	Democratic	1932	Incumbent lost re-election. Republican gain.	▌ ✓ J. Francis Harter (Republican) 50.5%; ▌Alfred F. Beiter (Democratic) 49.1%; ▌Alice Lebert (Socialist) 0.4%
New York 42	James M. Mead	Democratic	1918	Incumbent retired to run for U.S. senator. Democratic hold.	▌ ✓ Pius Schwert (Democratic) 45.8%; ▌John C. Butler (Republican) 42.3%; ▌John A. Ulinski (Independent) 11.1%; ▌John E. Kralisz (Independent) 0.5%; ▌Connie Wilson (Socialist) 0.3%
New York 43	Daniel A. Reed	Republican	1918	Incumbent re-elected.	▌ ✓ Daniel A. Reed (Republican) 65.3%; ▌Samuel A. Carlson (Democratic) 34.7%
New York at-large	Caroline O'Day	Democratic	1934	Incumbent re-elected.	▌ ✓ Caroline O'Day (Democratic) 26.7%; ▌ ✓ Matthew J. Merritt (Democratic) 26.5%; ▌Helen Z. M. Rodgers (Republican) 22.6%; ▌Richard B. Scandrett, Jr. (Republican) 22.3%; ▌Israel Amter (Communist) 1.2%; ▌Edna Mitchell Blue (Socialist) 0.3%; ▌Brendan Sexton (Socialist) 0.3%; ▌Jeremiah D. Crowley (Industrial Government) 0.06%; ▌William Herlet (Industrial Government) 0.05%
New York at-large	Matthew J. Merritt	Democratic	1934	Incumbent re-elected.	▌ ✓ Caroline O'Day (Democratic) 26.7%; ▌ ✓ Matthew J. Merritt (Democratic) 26.5%; ▌Helen Z. M. Rodgers (Republican) 22.6%; ▌Richard B. Scandrett, Jr. (Republican) 22.3%; ▌Israel Amter (Communist) 1.2%; ▌Edna Mitchell Blue (Socialist) 0.3%; ▌Brendan Sexton (Socialist) 0.3%; ▌Jeremiah D. Crowley (Industrial Government) 0.06%; ▌William Herlet (Industrial Government) 0.05%

== North Carolina ==
District	Incumbent	Party	First elected	Result	Candidates
North Carolina 1	Lindsay C. Warren	Democratic	1924	Incumbent re-elected.	▌ ✓ Lindsay C. Warren (Democratic); Uncontested
North Carolina 2	John H. Kerr	Democratic	1923 (special)	Incumbent re-elected.	▌ ✓ John H. Kerr (Democratic); Uncontested
North Carolina 3	Graham Arthur Barden	Democratic	1934	Incumbent re-elected.	▌ ✓ Graham Arthur Barden (Democratic); Uncontested
North Carolina 4	Harold D. Cooley	Democratic	1934	Incumbent re-elected.	▌ ✓ Harold D. Cooley (Democratic) 63.9%; ▌Willis G. Briggs (Republican) 36.1%
North Carolina 5	Franklin Wills Hancock Jr.	Democratic	1930	Incumbent retired to run for U.S. senator. Democratic hold.	▌ ✓ Alonzo Dillard Folger (Democratic) 69.7%; ▌John W. Kurfees Jr. (Republican) 30.3%
North Carolina 6	William B. Umstead	Democratic	1932	Incumbent retired. Democratic hold.	▌ ✓ Carl T. Durham (Democratic) 75.2%; ▌Oscar G. Barker (Independent) 24.8%
North Carolina 7	J. Bayard Clark	Democratic	1928	Incumbent re-elected.	▌ ✓ J. Bayard Clark (Democratic) 75.7%; ▌Edgar C. Geddie (Republican) 24.3%
North Carolina 8	Walter Lambeth	Democratic	1930	Incumbent retired. Democratic hold.	▌ ✓ William O. Burgin (Democratic) 55.2%; ▌John R. Jones (Republican) 44.8%
North Carolina 9	Robert L. Doughton	Democratic	1910	Incumbent re-elected.	▌ ✓ Robert L. Doughton (Democratic) 60.9%; ▌Monroe Adams (Republican) 39.1%
North Carolina 10	Alfred L. Bulwinkle	Democratic	1930	Incumbent re-elected.	▌ ✓ Alfred L. Bulwinkle (Democratic) 56.5%; ▌Frank C. Patton (Republican) 43.5%
North Carolina 11	Zebulon Weaver	Democratic	1930	Incumbent re-elected.	▌ ✓ Zebulon Weaver (Democratic) 63.8%; ▌Vonno L. Gudger (Republican) 36.2%

== North Dakota ==
District	Incumbent	Party	First elected	Result	Candidates
North Dakota at-large	William Lemke	Republican-NPL	1932	Incumbent re-elected.	▌ ✓ William Lemke (Republican-NPL) 37.3%; ▌ ✓ Usher L. Burdick (Republican-NPL) 36.3%; ▌Howard I. Henry (Democratic) 13.4%; ▌Alfred S. Dale (Democratic) 10.9%; ▌J. B. Field (Independent) 2.0%
North Dakota at-large	Usher L. Burdick	Republican-NPL	1934	Incumbent re-elected.	▌ ✓ William Lemke (Republican-NPL) 37.3%; ▌ ✓ Usher L. Burdick (Republican-NPL) 36.3%; ▌Howard I. Henry (Democratic) 13.4%; ▌Alfred S. Dale (Democratic) 10.9%; ▌J. B. Field (Independent) 2.0%

== Ohio ==
District	Incumbent	Party	First elected	Result	Candidates
Ohio 1	Joseph A. Dixon	Democratic	1936	Incumbent lost re-election. Republican gain.	▌ ✓ Charles H. Elston (Republican) 58.2%; ▌Joseph A. Dixon (Democratic) 41.8%
Ohio 2	Herbert S. Bigelow	Democratic	1936	Incumbent lost re-election. Republican gain.	▌ ✓ William E. Hess (Republican) 59.0%; ▌Herbert S. Bigelow (Democratic) 41.0%
Ohio 3	Byron B. Harlan	Democratic	1930	Incumbent lost re-election. Republican gain.	▌ ✓ Harry N. Routzohn (Republican) 55.8%; ▌Byron B. Harlan (Democratic) 44.2%
Ohio 4	Vacant			Frank L. Kloeb (D) resigned August 19, 1937. Republican gain.	▌ ✓ Robert F. Jones (Republican) 59.8%; ▌William B. Swonger (Democratic) 35.3%; ▌John C. Fisher (Independent) 4.9%
Ohio 5	Frank C. Kniffin	Democratic	1930	Incumbent lost re-election. Republican gain.	▌ ✓ Cliff Clevenger (Republican) 56.8%; ▌Frank C. Kniffin (Democratic) 43.2%
Ohio 6	James G. Polk	Democratic	1930	Incumbent re-elected.	▌ ✓ James G. Polk (Democratic) 50.5%; ▌Emory F. Smith (Republican) 49.5%
Ohio 7	Arthur W. Aleshire	Democratic	1936	Incumbent lost re-election. Republican gain.	▌ ✓ Clarence J. Brown (Republican) 57.6%; ▌Arthur W. Aleshire (Democratic) 42.4%
Ohio 8	Thomas B. Fletcher	Democratic	1932	Incumbent lost re-election. Republican gain.	▌ ✓ Frederick C. Smith (Republican) 54.5%; ▌Thomas B. Fletcher (Democratic) 45.5%
Ohio 9	John F. Hunter	Democratic	1936	Incumbent re-elected.	▌ ✓ John F. Hunter (Democratic) 50.4%; ▌Homer A. Ramey (Republican) 49.6%
Ohio 10	Thomas A. Jenkins	Republican	1924	Incumbent re-elected.	▌ ✓ Thomas A. Jenkins (Republican) 66.0%; ▌Elsie Stanton (Democratic) 34.0%
Ohio 11	Harold K. Claypool	Democratic	1936	Incumbent re-elected.	▌ ✓ Harold K. Claypool (Democratic) 52.1%; ▌Tom P. White (Republican) 47.9%
Ohio 12	Arthur P. Lamneck	Democratic	1930	Incumbent lost re-election. Republican gain.	▌ ✓ John M. Vorys (Republican) 50.9%; ▌Arthur P. Lamneck (Democratic) 49.1%
Ohio 13	Dudley A. White	Republican	1936	Incumbent re-elected.	▌ ✓ Dudley A. White (Republican) 69.4%; ▌William L. Fiesinger (Democratic) 30.6%
Ohio 14	Dow W. Harter	Democratic	1932	Incumbent re-elected.	▌ ✓ Dow W. Harter (Democratic) 53.3%; ▌Edward S. Sheck (Republican) 46.7%
Ohio 15	Robert T. Secrest	Democratic	1932	Incumbent re-elected.	▌ ✓ Robert T. Secrest (Democratic) 52.3%; ▌P. W. Griffiths (Republican) 47.7%
Ohio 16	William R. Thom	Democratic	1932	Incumbent lost re-election. Republican gain.	▌ ✓ James Seccombe (Republican) 50.7%; ▌William R. Thom (Democratic) 49.3%
Ohio 17	William A. Ashbrook	Democratic	1934	Incumbent re-elected.	▌ ✓ William A. Ashbrook (Democratic) 52.6%; ▌Walter B. Woodward (Republican) 47.4%
Ohio 18	Lawrence E. Imhoff	Democratic	1932	Incumbent lost re-election. Republican gain.	▌ ✓ Earl R. Lewis (Republican) 50.3%; ▌Lawrence E. Imhoff (Democratic) 49.7%
Ohio 19	Michael J. Kirwan	Democratic	1936	Incumbent re-elected.	▌ ✓ Michael J. Kirwan (Democratic) 52.4%; ▌William P. Barnum (Republican) 47.6%
Ohio 20	Martin L. Sweeney	Democratic	1931 (special)	Incumbent re-elected.	▌ ✓ Martin L. Sweeney (Democratic) 70.4%; ▌Thomas F. McCafferty (Republican) 29.6%
Ohio 21	Robert Crosser	Democratic	1922	Incumbent re-elected.	▌ ✓ Robert Crosser (Democratic) 68.7%; ▌J. E. Chizek (Republican) 31.3%
Ohio 22	Anthony A. Fleger	Democratic	1936	Incumbent lost re-election. Republican gain.	▌ ✓ Chester C. Bolton (Republican) 55.5%; ▌Anthony A. Fleger (Democratic) 44.5%
Ohio at-large	Harold G. Mosier	Democratic	1936	Incumbent lost renomination. Republican gain.	▌ ✓ George H. Bender (Republican) 27.0%; ▌ ✓ L. L. Marshall (Republican) 25.2%; ▌Stephen M. Young (Democratic) 24.5%; ▌John McSweeney (Democratic) 23.3%
Ohio at-large	John McSweeney	Democratic	1936	Incumbent lost re-election. Republican gain.	▌ ✓ George H. Bender (Republican) 27.0%; ▌ ✓ L. L. Marshall (Republican) 25.2%; ▌Stephen M. Young (Democratic) 24.5%; ▌John McSweeney (Democratic) 23.3%

== Oklahoma ==
District	Incumbent	Party	First elected	Result	Candidates
Oklahoma 1	Wesley E. Disney	Democratic	1930	Incumbent re-elected.	▌ ✓ Wesley E. Disney (Democratic) 63.2%; ▌A. M. Armstrong (Republican) 36.3%; ▌Martha A. Morrison (Prohibition) 0.3%; ▌Philip J. Dickerson (Independent) 0.2%
Oklahoma 2	John Conover Nichols	Democratic	1934	Incumbent re-elected.	▌ ✓ John Conover Nichols (Democratic) 71.3%; ▌Bruce L. Keenan (Republican) 28.7%
Oklahoma 3	Wilburn Cartwright	Democratic	1926	Incumbent re-elected.	▌ ✓ Wilburn Cartwright (Democratic) 85.4%; ▌Frank D. McSherry (Republican) 14.6%
Oklahoma 4	Lyle Boren	Democratic	1936	Incumbent re-elected.	▌ ✓ Lyle Boren (Democratic) 71.6%; ▌Ed Ball (Republican) 28.4%
Oklahoma 5	Gomer Griffith Smith	Democratic	1937 (special)	Retired to run for U.S. senator. Democratic hold.	▌ ✓ Mike Monroney (Democratic) 71.9%; ▌Harlan Deupree (Republican) 27.6%; ▌Lizzie Varvil (Prohibition) 0.5%
Oklahoma 6	Jed Johnson	Democratic	1926	Incumbent re-elected.	▌ ✓ Jed Johnson (Democratic) 69.5%; ▌James F. Rowell (Republican) 30.1%; ▌Margaret E. W. Austin (Prohibition) 0.4%
Oklahoma 7	Sam C. Massingale	Democratic	1934	Incumbent re-elected.	▌ ✓ Sam C. Massingale (Democratic) 76.1%; ▌A. L. Smith (Republican) 23.9%
Oklahoma 8	Phil Ferguson	Democratic	1934	Incumbent re-elected.	▌ ✓ Phil Ferguson (Democratic) 50.2%; ▌Charles E. Knox (Republican) 49.2%; ▌H. P. Hunt (Prohibition) 0.7%
Oklahoma at-large	Will Rogers	Democratic	1932	Incumbent re-elected.	▌ ✓ Will Rogers (Democratic) 68.7%; ▌R. R. Wilson (Republican) 30.9%; ▌E. W. Fickinger (Prohibition) 0.4%

== Oregon ==
District	Incumbent	Party	First elected	Result	Candidates
Oregon 1	James W. Mott	Republican	1932	Incumbent re-elected.	▌ ✓ James W. Mott (Republican) 70.7%; ▌Andrew C. Burk (Democratic) 29.3%
Oregon 2	Walter M. Pierce	Democratic	1932	Incumbent re-elected.	▌ ✓ Walter M. Pierce (Democratic) 57.9%; ▌U.S. Ballentine (Republican) 42.1%
Oregon 3	Nan Wood Honeyman	Democratic	1936	Incumbent lost re-election. Republican gain.	▌ ✓ Homer D. Angell (Republican) 50.9%; ▌Nan Wood Honeyman (Democratic) 49.1%

== Pennsylvania ==
District	Incumbent	Party	First elected	Result	Candidates
Pennsylvania 1	Leon Sacks	Democratic	1936	Incumbent re-elected.	▌ ✓ Leon Sacks (Democratic) 53.5%; ▌John Alessandroni (Republican) 46.5%
Pennsylvania 2	James P. McGranery	Democratic	1936	Incumbent re-elected.	▌ ✓ James P. McGranery (Democratic) 52.4%; ▌Edward W. Henry (Republican) 47.0%; ▌Charles W. Drummond (Royal Oak) 0.4%; ▌Reginald B. Naugle (Independent) 0.2%
Pennsylvania 3	Michael J. Bradley	Democratic	1936	Incumbent re-elected.	▌ ✓ Michael J. Bradley (Democratic) 52.0%; ▌William T. Connor (Republican) 48.0%
Pennsylvania 4	J. Burrwood Daly	Democratic	1934	Incumbent re-elected.	▌ ✓ J. Burrwood Daly (Democratic) 53.8%; ▌Edward F. Roberts (Republican) 45.6%; ▌Frank A. Warner (Royal Oak) 0.4%; ▌Donato Di Iorio (State Rights) 0.2%
Pennsylvania 5	Frank J. G. Dorsey	Democratic	1934	Incumbent lost re-election. Republican gain.	▌ ✓ Fred C. Gartner (Republican) 52.5%; ▌Frank J. G. Dorsey (Democratic) 46.5%; ▌Edward M. Walsh (Royal Oak) 0.9%; ▌Anthony De Lisi (State Rights) 0.09%
Pennsylvania 6	Michael J. Stack	Democratic	1934	Incumbent lost renomination and re-election as Royal Oak. Democratic hold.	▌ ✓ Francis J. Myers (Democratic) 49.9%; ▌J. Howard Berry, Jr. (Republican) 47.5%; ▌Michael J. Stack (Royal Oak) 2.6%
Pennsylvania 7	Ira W. Drew	Democratic	1936	Incumbent lost re-election. Republican gain.	▌ ✓ George P. Darrow (Republican) 59.3%; ▌Ira W. Drew (Democratic) 40.2%; ▌John J. King (Royal Oak) 0.5%
Pennsylvania 8	James Wolfenden	Republican	1928	Incumbent re-elected.	▌ ✓ James Wolfenden (Republican) 67.6%; ▌C. Fenno Hoffman (Democratic) 32.4%
Pennsylvania 9	Oliver W. Frey	Democratic	1933	Incumbent lost re-election. Republican gain.	▌ ✓ Charles L. Gerlach (Republican) 56.7%; ▌Oliver W. Frey (Democratic) 43.1%; ▌B. H. Maybury (Prohibition) 0.2%
Pennsylvania 10	J. Roland Kinzer	Republican	1930	Incumbent re-elected.	▌ ✓ J. Roland Kinzer (Republican) 64.1%; ▌Thomas Jefferson McClelland (Democratic) 35.7%; ▌Harry P. Young (Royal Oak) 0.2%
Pennsylvania 11	Patrick J. Boland	Democratic	1930	Incumbent re-elected.	▌ ✓ Patrick J. Boland (Democratic) 52.5%; ▌William F. Hallstead (Republican) 47.5%
Pennsylvania 12	J. Harold Flannery	Democratic	1936	Incumbent re-elected.	▌ ✓ J. Harold Flannery (Democratic) 51.2%; ▌Michael A. Yeosock (Republican) 48.8%
Pennsylvania 13	James H. Gildea	Democratic	1934	Incumbent lost re-election. Republican gain.	▌ ✓ Ivor D. Fenton (Republican) 53.2%; ▌James H. Gildea (Democratic) 46.8%
Pennsylvania 14	Guy L. Moser	Democratic	1936	Incumbent re-elected.	▌ ✓ Guy L. Moser (Democratic) 46.7%; ▌John C. Evans (Republican) 41.9%; ▌Raymond S. Hofses (Socialist) 11.4%
Pennsylvania 15	Albert G. Rutherford	Republican	1936	Incumbent re-elected.	▌ ✓ Albert G. Rutherford (Republican) 61.6%; ▌Harry M. Turrell (Democratic) 37.9%; ▌Judson N. Bailey (Prohibition) 0.5%
Pennsylvania 16	Robert F. Rich	Republican	1930	Incumbent re-elected.	▌ ✓ Robert F. Rich (Republican) 61.5%; ▌Paul A. Rothfuss (Democratic) 37.8%; ▌Emma McNaughton (Prohibition) 0.5%; ▌George Rogers (Royal Oak) 0.2%
Pennsylvania 17	J. William Ditter	Republican	1932	Incumbent re-elected.	▌ ✓ J. William Ditter (Republican) 68.5%; ▌Carroll L. Rutter (Democratic) 31.2%; ▌Frank P. Klesichte (Royal Oak) 0.3%
Pennsylvania 18	Richard M. Simpson	Republican	1937 (special)	Incumbent re-elected.	▌ ✓ Richard M. Simpson (Republican) 60.5%; ▌Richard L. Schroyer (Democratic) 39.5%
Pennsylvania 19	Guy J. Swope	Democratic	1936	Incumbent lost re-election. Republican gain.	▌ ✓ John C. Kunkel (Republican) 55.0%; ▌Guy J. Swope (Democratic) 45.0%; ▌Frank Tate (Independent) 0.004%; ▌George I. Pieffer (Prohibition) 0.001%
Pennsylvania 20	Benjamin Jarrett	Republican	1936	Incumbent re-elected.	▌ ✓ Benjamin Jarrett (Republican) 61.1%; ▌Earl H. Beshlin (Democratic) 37.7%; ▌Maude G. Reynolds (Prohibition) 1.2%
Pennsylvania 21	Francis E. Walter	Democratic	1932	Incumbent re-elected.	▌ ✓ Francis E. Walter (Democratic) 50.2%; ▌Alonzo L. Reinhard (Republican) 48.4%; ▌Everett Kent (Royal Oak) 1.4%
Pennsylvania 22	Harry L. Haines	Democratic	1930	Incumbent lost re-election. Republican gain.	▌ ✓ Chester H. Gross (Republican) 50.3%; ▌Harry L. Haines (Democratic) 49.7%
Pennsylvania 23	Don Gingery	Democratic	1934	Incumbent lost re-election. Republican gain.	▌ ✓ James E. Van Zandt (Republican) 57.1%; ▌Don Gingery (Democratic) 42.5%; ▌Aaron N. Work (Prohibition) 0.4%
Pennsylvania 24	J. Buell Snyder	Democratic	1932	Incumbent re-elected.	▌ ✓ J. Buell Snyder (Democratic) 51.2%; ▌J. C. Glassburn (Republican) 48.5%; ▌Minnie B. Shaulis (Prohibition) 0.3%
Pennsylvania 25	Charles I. Faddis	Democratic	1932	Incumbent re-elected.	▌ ✓ Charles I. Faddis (Democratic) 53.1%; ▌Warren S. Burchinal (Republican) 46.9%
Pennsylvania 26	Charles R. Eckert	Democratic	1934	Incumbent lost re-election. Republican gain.	▌ ✓ Louis E. Graham (Republican) 52.4%; ▌Charles R. Eckert (Democratic) 46.8%; ▌Samuel R. Maitland (Prohibition) 0.8%
Pennsylvania 27	Joseph Anthony Gray	Democratic	1934	Incumbent lost re-election. Republican gain.	▌ ✓ Harve Tibbott (Republican) 55.8%; ▌Joseph Anthony Gray (Democratic) 43.6%; ▌James T. Malloy (Royal Oak) 0.4%; ▌Nathan Asbel (Socialist) 0.3%
Pennsylvania 28	Robert G. Allen	Democratic	1936	Incumbent re-elected.	▌ ✓ Robert G. Allen (Democratic) 53.9%; ▌Roy C. McKenna (Republican) 45.8%; ▌S. W. Bierer (Prohibition) 0.4%
Pennsylvania 29	Charles N. Crosby	Democratic	1932	Incumbent lost renomination. Republican gain.	▌ ✓ Robert L. Rodgers (Republican) 53.8%; ▌Norbert James Fitzgerald (Democratic) 45.6%; ▌Ira M. Ramsey (Prohibition) 0.6%
Pennsylvania 30	Peter J. De Muth	Democratic	1936	Incumbent lost re-election. Republican gain.	▌ ✓ Robert J. Corbett (Republican) 51.2%; ▌Peter J. De Muth (Democratic) 48.8%
Pennsylvania 31	James L. Quinn	Democratic	1934	Incumbent lost re-election. Republican gain.	▌ ✓ John McDowell (Republican) 50.7%; ▌James L. Quinn (Democratic) 48.8%; ▌M. J. Dibble (Prohibition) 0.5%
Pennsylvania 32	Herman P. Eberharter	Democratic	1936	Incumbent re-elected.	▌ ✓ Herman P. Eberharter (Democratic) 63.3%; ▌Jacob E. Klason (Republican) 36.1%; ▌Stanley K. Kazorski (Royal Oak) 0.6%
Pennsylvania 33	Henry Ellenbogen	Democratic	1932	Incumbent resigned when elected judge. Democratic hold.	▌ ✓ Joseph A. McArdle (Democratic) 51.6%; ▌James I. Marsh (Republican) 48.4%
Pennsylvania 34	Matthew A. Dunn	Democratic	1932	Incumbent re-elected.	▌ ✓ Matthew A. Dunn (Democratic) 50.0%; ▌Robert B. McKinley (Republican) 49.6%; ▌Walter L. Bouve, Jr. (Independent) 0.4%

== Rhode Island ==
District	Incumbent	Party	First elected	Result	Candidates
Rhode Island 1	Aime Forand	Democratic	1936	Incumbent lost re-election. Republican gain.	▌ ✓ Charles Risk (Republican) 50.3%; ▌Aime Forand (Democratic) 49.7%
Rhode Island 2	John M. O'Connell	Democratic	1932	Incumbent retired. Republican gain.	▌ ✓ Harry Sandager (Republican) 57.0%; ▌Edward J. Fenelon Jr. (Democratic) 43.0%

== South Carolina ==
District	Incumbent	Party	First elected	Result	Candidates
South Carolina 1	Thomas S. McMillan	Democratic	1924	Incumbent re-elected.	▌ ✓ Thomas S. McMillan (Democratic) 98.2%; ▌B. L. Hendrix (Republican) 1.7%; ▌J. E. D. Meyer (Independent) 0.04%
South Carolina 2	Hampton P. Fulmer	Democratic	1920	Incumbent re-elected.	▌ ✓ Hampton P. Fulmer (Democratic) 98.8%; ▌B. L. Hendrix (Republican) 0.8%; ▌S. J. Leaphart (Independent) 0.4%
South Carolina 3	John C. Taylor	Democratic	1932	Incumbent lost renomination. Democratic hold.	▌ ✓ Butler B. Hare (Democratic) 99.6%; ▌O. B. Menees (Republican) 0.4%
South Carolina 4	Gabriel H. Mahon Jr.	Democratic	1936	Incumbent lost renomination. Democratic hold.	▌ ✓ Joseph R. Bryson (Democratic) 99.4%; ▌H. A. Costner (Republican) 0.6%
South Carolina 5	James P. Richards	Democratic	1932	Incumbent re-elected.	▌ ✓ James P. Richards (Democratic) 99.8%; ▌A. B. McCraw (Republican) 0.2%
South Carolina 6	Elizabeth Hawley Gasque	Democratic	1938 (special)	Incumbent retired. Democratic hold.	▌ ✓ John L. McMillan (Democratic) 99.2%; ▌W. S. Thompson (Independent) 0.8%

== South Dakota ==
District	Incumbent	Party	First elected	Result	Candidates
South Dakota 1	Fred H. Hildebrandt	Democratic	1932	Retired to run for U.S. senator. Republican gain.	▌ ✓ Karl Mundt (Republican) 54.0%; ▌Emil Loriks (Democratic) 46.0%
South Dakota 2	Francis Case	Republican	1936	Incumbent re-elected.	▌ ✓ Francis Case (Republican) 61.4%; ▌Theodore B. Werner (Democratic) 38.6%

== Tennessee ==
District	Incumbent	Party	First elected	Result	Candidates
Tennessee 1	B. Carroll Reece	Republican	1932	Incumbent re-elected.	▌ ✓ B. Carroll Reece (Republican) 58.0%; ▌John A. Armstrong (Democratic) 26.5%; ▌James P. Kivett (Independent) 10.9%; ▌Charles W. Clark (Independent) 3.1%; ▌G. M. Smith (Independent) 1.5%
Tennessee 2	J. Will Taylor	Republican	1918	Incumbent re-elected.	▌ ✓ J. Will Taylor (Republican) 64.1%; ▌Judd Acuff (Independent) 32.0%; ▌Calvin Rutherford (Independent) 4.0%
Tennessee 3	Sam D. McReynolds	Democratic	1922	Incumbent re-elected.	▌ ✓ Sam D. McReynolds (Democratic) 73.9%; ▌Joe E. Benson (Republican) 26.1%
Tennessee 4	John Ridley Mitchell	Democratic	1930	Retired to run for U.S. senator. Democratic hold.	▌ ✓ Albert Gore Sr. (Democratic); Uncontested
Tennessee 5	Richard Merrill Atkinson	Democratic	1936	Incumbent lost renomination. Democratic hold.	▌ ✓ Joseph W. Byrns Jr. (Democratic) 90.6%; ▌William I. Love (Independent) 9.4%
Tennessee 6	Clarence W. Turner	Democratic	1932	Incumbent re-elected.	▌ ✓ Clarence W. Turner (Democratic) 82.2%; ▌John V. McDonough (Independent) 11.2%; ▌Maurice G. Riding (Independent) 6.6%
Tennessee 7	Herron C. Pearson	Democratic	1934	Incumbent re-elected.	▌ ✓ Herron C. Pearson (Democratic); Uncontested
Tennessee 8	Jere Cooper	Democratic	1928	Incumbent re-elected.	▌ ✓ Jere Cooper (Democratic) 95.4%; ▌David I. Nunn (Republican) 4.6%
Tennessee 9	Walter Chandler	Democratic	1936	Incumbent re-elected.	▌ ✓ Walter Chandler (Democratic) 98.4%; ▌Edgar L. Clark (Independent) 1.6%

== Texas ==
District	Incumbent	Party	First elected	Result	Candidates
Texas 1	Wright Patman	Democratic	1928	Incumbent re-elected.	▌ ✓ Wright Patman (Democratic) 98.8%; ▌Joe C. Hailey (Republican) 1.2%
Texas 2	Martin Dies Jr.	Democratic	1930	Incumbent re-elected.	▌ ✓ Martin Dies Jr. (Democratic); Uncontested
Texas 3	Morgan G. Sanders	Democratic	1920	Incumbent lost renomination. Democratic hold.	▌ ✓ Lindley Beckworth (Democratic); Uncontested
Texas 4	Sam Rayburn	Democratic	1912	Incumbent re-elected.	▌ ✓ Sam Rayburn (Democratic) 97.9%; ▌Ross E. Johnson (Republican) 2.1%
Texas 5	Hatton W. Sumners	Democratic	1914	Incumbent re-elected.	▌ ✓ Hatton W. Sumners (Democratic) 95.0%; ▌Heber Page (Republican) 4.7%; ▌H. T. Healey (Independent) 0.3%
Texas 6	Luther A. Johnson	Democratic	1922	Incumbent re-elected.	▌ ✓ Luther A. Johnson (Democratic); Uncontested
Texas 7	Nat Patton	Democratic	1934	Incumbent re-elected.	▌ ✓ Nat Patton (Democratic); Uncontested
Texas 8	Albert Thomas	Democratic	1936	Incumbent re-elected.	▌ ✓ Albert Thomas (Democratic) 98.3%; ▌John A. Deering (Republican) 1.7%
Texas 9	Joseph J. Mansfield	Democratic	1916	Incumbent re-elected.	▌ ✓ Joseph J. Mansfield (Democratic); Uncontested
Texas 10	Lyndon B. Johnson	Democratic	1937 (special)	Incumbent re-elected.	▌ ✓ Lyndon B. Johnson (Democratic); Uncontested
Texas 11	William R. Poage	Democratic	1936	Incumbent re-elected.	▌ ✓ William R. Poage (Democratic) 98.6%; ▌D. E. Wooley (Republican) 1.4%
Texas 12	Fritz G. Lanham	Democratic	1919 (special)	Incumbent re-elected.	▌ ✓ Fritz G. Lanham (Democratic); Uncontested
Texas 13	William D. McFarlane	Democratic	1932	Incumbent lost renomination. Democratic hold.	▌ ✓ Ed Gossett (Democratic) 98.6%; ▌Adolph Lohman (Republican) 1.4%
Texas 14	Richard M. Kleberg	Democratic	1931 (special)	Incumbent re-elected.	▌ ✓ Richard M. Kleberg (Democratic); Uncontested
Texas 15	Milton H. West	Democratic	1933 (special)	Incumbent re-elected.	▌ ✓ Milton H. West (Democratic); Uncontested
Texas 16	R. Ewing Thomason	Democratic	1930	Incumbent re-elected.	▌ ✓ R. Ewing Thomason (Democratic); Uncontested
Texas 17	Clyde L. Garrett	Democratic	1936	Incumbent re-elected.	▌ ✓ Clyde L. Garrett (Democratic); Uncontested
Texas 18	John Marvin Jones	Democratic	1916	Incumbent re-elected.	▌ ✓ John Marvin Jones (Democratic); Uncontested
Texas 19	George H. Mahon	Democratic	1934	Incumbent re-elected.	▌ ✓ George H. Mahon (Democratic); Uncontested
Texas 20	Maury Maverick	Democratic	1934	Incumbent lost renomination. Democratic hold.	▌ ✓ Paul J. Kilday (Democratic); Uncontested
Texas 21	Charles L. South	Democratic	1934	Incumbent re-elected.	▌ ✓ Charles L. South (Democratic) 93.0%; ▌Max J. Bierschwale (Republican) 7.0%

== Utah ==
District	Incumbent	Party	First elected	Result	Candidates
Utah 1	Abe Murdock	Democratic	1932	Incumbent re-elected.	▌ ✓ Abe Murdock (Democratic) 59.7%; ▌LeRoy B. Young (Republican) 40.3%
Utah 2	J. W. Robinson	Democratic	1932	Incumbent re-elected.	▌ ✓ J. W. Robinson (Democratic) 62.3%; ▌Dean F. Brayton (Republican) 37.7%

== Vermont ==
District	Incumbent	Party	First elected	Result	Candidates
Vermont at-large	Charles Albert Plumley	Republican	1934	Incumbent re-elected.	▌ ✓ Charles Albert Plumley (Republican) 64.0%; ▌James Patrick Leamy (Democratic) 36.0%

== Virginia ==
District	Incumbent	Party	First elected	Result	Candidates
Virginia 1	S. Otis Bland	Democratic	1918	Incumbent re-elected.	▌ ✓ S. Otis Bland (Democratic); Uncontested
Virginia 2	Norman R. Hamilton	Democratic	1936	Incumbent lost renomination. Democratic hold.	▌ ✓ Colgate Darden (Democratic) 87.7%; ▌Carl P. Spaeth (Independent) 12.3%
Virginia 3	Dave E. Satterfield Jr.	Democratic	1937 (special)	Incumbent re-elected.	▌ ✓ Dave E. Satterfield Jr. (Democratic); Uncontested
Virginia 4	Patrick H. Drewry	Democratic	1920	Incumbent re-elected.	▌ ✓ Patrick H. Drewry (Democratic); Uncontested
Virginia 5	Thomas G. Burch	Democratic	1930	Incumbent re-elected.	▌ ✓ Thomas G. Burch (Democratic); Uncontested
Virginia 6	Clifton A. Woodrum	Democratic	1922	Incumbent re-elected.	▌ ✓ Clifton A. Woodrum (Democratic) 55.9%; ▌Fred W. McWane (Republican) 44.1%
Virginia 7	A. Willis Robertson	Democratic	1932	Incumbent re-elected.	▌ ✓ A. Willis Robertson (Democratic) 63.9%; ▌Charles C. Leap (Republican) 36.1%
Virginia 8	Howard W. Smith	Democratic	1930	Incumbent re-elected.	▌ ✓ Howard W. Smith (Democratic); Uncontested
Virginia 9	John W. Flannagan Jr.	Democratic	1930	Incumbent re-elected.	▌ ✓ John W. Flannagan Jr. (Democratic) 66.7%; ▌L. E. Gulliford (Republican) 33.3%

== Washington ==
District	Incumbent	Party	First elected	Result	Candidates
Washington 1	Warren Magnuson	Democratic	1936	Incumbent re-elected.	▌ ✓ Warren Magnuson (Democratic) 61.7%; ▌Matthew W. Hill (Republican) 38.3%
Washington 2	Monrad Wallgren	Democratic	1932	Incumbent re-elected.	▌ ✓ Monrad Wallgren (Democratic) 61.5%; ▌Charles A. Sather (Republican) 38.5%
Washington 3	Martin F. Smith	Democratic	1932	Incumbent re-elected.	▌ ✓ Martin F. Smith (Democratic) 60.3%; ▌Walter S. Talbott (Republican) 39.7%
Washington 4	Knute Hill	Democratic	1932	Incumbent re-elected.	▌ ✓ Knute Hill (Democratic) 50.4%; ▌Frank Miller (Republican) 49.6%
Washington 5	Charles H. Leavy	Democratic	1936	Incumbent re-elected.	▌ ✓ Charles H. Leavy (Democratic) 57.1%; ▌Norman A. Ericson (Republican) 42.0%; ▌John F. McKay (Ind Soc) 0.9%
Washington 6	John M. Coffee	Democratic	1936	Incumbent re-elected.	▌ ✓ John M. Coffee (Democratic) 73.0%; ▌Willard V. Young (Republican) 27.0%

== West Virginia ==
District	Incumbent	Party	First elected	Result	Candidates
West Virginia 1	Robert L. Ramsay	Democratic	1932	Incumbent lost re-election. Republican gain.	▌ ✓ A. C. Schiffler (Republican) 54.8%; ▌Robert L. Ramsay (Democratic) 45.2%
West Virginia 2	Jennings Randolph	Democratic	1932	Incumbent re-elected.	▌ ✓ Jennings Randolph (Democratic) 54.6%; ▌Melvin C. Snyder (Republican) 45.4%
West Virginia 3	Andrew Edmiston Jr.	Democratic	1933 (special)	Incumbent re-elected.	▌ ✓ Andrew Edmiston Jr. (Democratic) 55.3%; ▌H. Roy Waugh (Republican) 44.7%
West Virginia 4	George W. Johnson	Democratic	1932	Incumbent re-elected.	▌ ✓ George W. Johnson (Democratic) 52.9%; ▌Raymond V. Humphreys (Republican) 47.1%
West Virginia 5	John Kee	Democratic	1932	Incumbent re-elected.	▌ ✓ John Kee (Democratic) 61.3%; ▌Hartley Sanders (Republican) 38.7%
West Virginia 6	Joe L. Smith	Democratic	1928	Incumbent re-elected.	▌ ✓ Joe L. Smith (Democratic) 62.3%; ▌R. E. O'Connor (Republican) 37.7%

== Wisconsin ==
District	Incumbent	Party	First elected	Result	Candidates
Wisconsin 1	Thomas Ryum Amlie	Progressive	1934	Retired to run for U.S. senator. Republican gain.	▌ ✓ Stephen Bolles (Republican) 49.1%; ▌Francis H. Wendt (Progressive) 32.0%; ▌Calvin Stewart (Democratic) 15.8%; ▌Harvey C. Hansen (Independent) 2.8%; ▌Thomas O. F. Randolph (Union) 0.2%
Wisconsin 2	Harry Sauthoff	Progressive	1934	Incumbent lost re-election. Republican gain.	▌ ✓ Charles Hawks Jr. (Republican) 44.8%; ▌Harry Sauthoff (Progressive) 43.3%; ▌Reinhold A. Gerth (Democratic) 11.9%
Wisconsin 3	Gardner R. Withrow	Progressive	1920	Incumbent lost re-election. Republican gain.	▌ ✓ Harry W. Griswold (Republican) 50.1%; ▌Gardner R. Withrow (Progressive) 42.0%; ▌Bart E. McGonigle (Democratic) 7.9%
Wisconsin 4	Raymond J. Cannon	Democratic	1932	Incumbent lost renomination and re-election as an Independent. Republican gain.	▌ ✓ John C. Schafer (Republican) 32.0%; ▌Thad F. Wasielewski (Democratic) 31.4%; ▌Paul Gauer (Progressive) 28.8%; ▌Raymond J. Cannon (Independent) 7.0%; ▌Robert Sprague (Union) 0.7%
Wisconsin 5	Thomas O'Malley	Democratic	1932	Incumbent lost re-election. Republican gain.	▌ ✓ Lewis D. Thill (Republican) 43.1%; ▌Thomas O'Malley (Democratic) 28.6%; ▌Alfred Benson (Progressive) 27.4%; ▌Henry W. Otto (Union) 0.9%
Wisconsin 6	Michael Reilly	Democratic	1930	Incumbent lost re-election. Republican gain.	▌ ✓ Frank B. Keefe (Republican) 53.6%; ▌Michael Reilly (Democratic) 30.1%; ▌Adam F. Poltl (Progressive) 15.4%; ▌Joseph Willihnganz (Union) 0.9%
Wisconsin 7	Gerald J. Boileau	Progressive	1930	Incumbent lost re-election. Republican gain.	▌ ✓ Reid F. Murray (Republican) 48.9%; ▌Gerald J. Boileau (Progressive) 38.0%; ▌James J. Cavanaugh (Democratic) 11.4%; ▌Herman H. Behm (Independent) 1.7%
Wisconsin 8	George J. Schneider	Progressive	1934	Incumbent lost re-election. Republican gain.	▌ ✓ Joshua L. Johns (Republican) 36.2%; ▌George J. Schneider (Progressive) 31.5%; ▌John E. Cashman (Democratic) 30.6%; ▌Peter J. Gloudemans (Union) 1.6%
Wisconsin 9	Merlin Hull	Progressive	1934	Incumbent re-elected.	▌ ✓ Merlin Hull (Progressive) 53.4%; ▌Hugh M. Jones (Republican) 40.3%; ▌William F. Crane (Democratic) 6.3%
Wisconsin 10	Bernard J. Gehrmann	Progressive	1934	Incumbent re-elected.	▌ ✓ Bernard J. Gehrmann (Progressive) 57.5%; ▌James H. Carroll (Republican) 42.5%

== Wyoming ==
District	Incumbent	Party	First elected	Result	Candidates
Wyoming at-large	Paul R. Greever	Democratic	1934	Incumbent lost re-election. Republican gain.	▌ ✓ Frank O. Horton (Republican) 52.9%; ▌Paul R. Greever (Democratic) 47.1%

== Non-voting delegates ==
=== Alaska Territory ===
Alaska Territory elected its non-voting delegate September 13, 1938.

District	Incumbent			This race	
District	Representative	Party	First elected	Results	Candidates
Alaska Territory at-large	Anthony Dimond	Democratic	1932	Incumbent re-elected.	▌ ✓ Anthony Dimond (Democratic) 63.71%; ▌George B. Grigsby (Independent) 19.68%; ▌Al White (Republican) 16.61%

== See also ==
- 1938 United States elections
  - 1938 United States Senate elections
- 75th United States Congress
- 76th United States Congress
