= Harry J. Davenport =

American politician

Henry J. Davenport

Member of the U.S. House of Representatives from Pennsylvania's 29th district
- In office January 3, 1949 – January 3, 1951
- Preceded by: John McDowell
- Succeeded by: Harmar D. Denny, Jr.

Personal details
- Born: August 22, 1902 Wilmerding, Pennsylvania, U.S.
- Died: December 19, 1977 (aged 75) Millvale, Pennsylvania, U.S.
- Party: Democratic

Harry James Davenport (August 22, 1902 – December 19, 1977) was a Democratic member of the U.S. House of Representatives from Pennsylvania.

== Biography ==
Harry J. Davenport was born in Wilmerding, Pennsylvania. He worked as a newspaper publisher. He was an unsuccessful candidate for nomination in 1946, but was elected as a Democrat to the Eighty-first Congress. He was an unsuccessful candidate for reelection in 1950 against Republican Harmar D. Denny, Jr. and 1960. He worked as a lecturer and book salesman, and resided in Millvale, Pennsylvania, until his death. He died on December 19, 1977.

== Sources ==
- United States Congress. "Harry J. Davenport (id: D000071)". Biographical Directory of the United States Congress.
- The Political Graveyard

U.S. House of Representatives
Preceded by John McDowell	Member of the U.S. House of Representatives from Pennsylvania's 29th congressional district 1949–1951	Succeeded by Harmar D. Denny, Jr.
