= Pennsylvania's 29th congressional district =

Former U.S. House district in Pennsylvania

Coordinates: 40°25′N 80°00′W

- Obsolete district
- Created: 1903
- Eliminated: 1960
- Years active: 1903-1963

Pennsylvania's 29th congressional district was one of Pennsylvania's districts of the United States House of Representatives.

== Geography ==
From 1903 to 1923, the district was located in western Pennsylvania near Pittsburgh. From 1923 to 1933, the district moved to northwest Pennsylvania near Erie. In 1933, the district returned to include portions of Pittsburgh. The district was eliminated in 1963.

== History ==
The 29th district was created in 1903 and eliminated in 1963.

== List of members representing the district ==
Member	Party	Years	Cong ress	Electoral history
District established March 4, 1903
George Shiras III (Allegheny City)	Independent; Republican	March 4, 1903 – March 3, 1905	58th	Elected in 1902. Retired.
William H. Graham (Allegheny City)	Republican	March 4, 1905 – March 3, 1911	59th 60th 61st	Elected in 1904. Re-elected in 1906. Re-elected in 1908. Lost renomination.
Stephen G. Porter (Pittsburgh)	Republican	March 4, 1911 – March 3, 1923	62nd 63rd 64th 65th 66th 67th	Elected in 1910. Re-elected in 1912. Re-elected in 1914. Re-elected in 1916. Re-elected in 1918; Re-elected in 1920. Redistricted to the 32nd district.
Milton W. Shreve (Erie)	Republican	March 4, 1923 – March 3, 1933	68th 69th 70th 71st 72nd	Redistricted from the 25th district and re-elected in 1922. Re-elected in 1924. Re-elected in 1926. Re-elected in 1928. Re-elected in 1930. Lost re-election.
Charles N. Crosby (Meadville)	Democratic	March 4, 1933 – January 3, 1939	73rd 74th 75th	Elected in 1932. Re-elected in 1934. Re-elected in 1936. Lost renomination.
Robert L. Rodgers (Erie)	Republican	January 3, 1939 – January 3, 1945	76th 77th 78th	Elected in 1938. Re-elected in 1940. Re-elected in 1942. Redistricted to the 28th district.
Howard E. Campbell (Pittsburgh)	Republican	January 3, 1945 – January 3, 1947	79th	Elected in 1944. Lost renomination.
John McDowell (Wilkinsburg)	Republican	January 3, 1947 – January 3, 1949	80th	Elected in 1946. Lost re-election.
Harry J. Davenport (Pittsburgh)	Democratic	January 3, 1949 – January 3, 1951	81st	Elected in 1948. Lost re-election.
Harmar D. Denny Jr. (Pittsburgh)	Republican	January 3, 1951 – January 3, 1953	82nd	Elected in 1950. Redistricted to the 28th district and lost re-election.
Robert J. Corbett (Pittsburgh)	Republican	January 3, 1953 – January 3, 1963	83rd 84th 85th 86th 87th	Redistricted from the 30th district and re-elected in 1952. Re-elected in 1954. Re-elected in 1956. Re-elected in 1958. Re-elected in 1960. Redistricted to the 18th district.
District dissolved January 3, 1963
