= John McDowell (Pennsylvania politician) =

American politician (1902–1957)

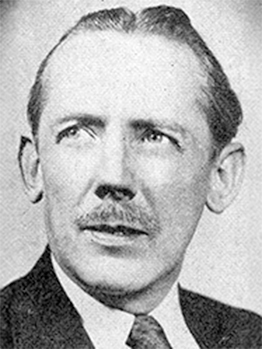

Member of the U.S. House of Representatives from Pennsylvania
- In office January 3, 1939 – January 3, 1941
- Preceded by: James L. Quinn
- Succeeded by: Samuel A. Weiss
- Constituency: 31st district
- In office January 3, 1947 – January 3, 1949
- Preceded by: Howard E. Campbell
- Succeeded by: Harry J. Davenport
- Constituency: 29th district

Personal details
- Born: John Ralph McDowell; November 6, 1902 Pitcairn, Pennsylvania, U.S.
- Died: December 11, 1957 (aged 55) Wilkinsburg, Pennsylvania, U.S.
- Party: Republican
- Spouse: Virginia McDowell
- Children: 1

John Ralph McDowell (November 6, 1902 – December 11, 1957) was an American politician. He was a member of the Republican Party and served two terms in the U.S. House of Representatives in the 29th district and 31st district of Pennsylvania.

== Early life and career ==
McDowell was born in Pitcairn, Pennsylvania. He graduated from Randolph-Macon Military Academy in Front Royal, Virginia, in 1923. He was employed as a reporter on the Pitcairn Express in 1923 and worked on various newspapers until 1929. He was magistrate of Pitcairn from 1925 to 1928. He became editor of the Wilkinsburg Gazette in 1929 and president of the Wilkinsburg Gazette Publishing Co. in 1933.

== Political career ==
In 1938, McDowell defeated incumbent James L. Quinn for a seat in the Seventy-sixth Congress, but was defeated after a single term by Samuel A. Weiss. He lost to Weiss in a rematch in 1942. In 1946, McDowell defeated Harry J. Davenport for a seat in the Eightieth Congress by just over 1,100 votes. It was a relatively narrow victory for a reliably Republican district.

McDowell served on the House Un-American Activities Committee (HUAC) in 1947 and 1948 and was acting chairman when J. Parnell Thomas was not presiding. He initially investigated suspected fascists on the committee. In early 1948, he argued against granting a visa to boxer Max Schmeling, who wanted to stage a comeback in the United States. The State Department later denied Schmeling the visa in that he did not meet any of the categories for granting visas to German citizens.

Later, he played a role in the Alger Hiss case. The key witness, Whittaker Chambers, was asked to provide details about Hiss that few people would know. He mentioned that Hiss was a birdwatcher and had bragged about seeing a prothonotary warbler. In the hearing Richard Nixon asked Hiss about his hobbies, to which he replied tennis and amateur ornithology. McDowell interjected with a question as to whether Hiss had ever seen a prothonotary warbler, to which Hiss gushed in the hearing that he had indeed, seen one, and described it to the committee. This helped persuade the committee that Chambers was being truthful.

On March 16, 1948, McDowell introduced a bill to grant the Speaker of the United States House of Representatives or the President of the United States Senate the power to obtain secret documents from any government agency.

McDowell stated:

The President, in an election year, is pulling down an iron curtain between Congress and information on the Government ... There would be protection in two ways–against some official who might attempt to suppress for political or personal reasons information Congress should have, and against some weird committee chairman who might go haywire and demand and make public all kinds of secret documents.

The day before, U.S. President Harry S. Truman issued an executive directive, which barred Congress from just that. The Washington Post praised the President in an editorial, arguing "Every consideration of common sense backs it up as well, of course. The loyalty program would be meaningless if suspect employees were to be tried in newspapers and before congressional committees."

In October 1948, after indictments against 12 suspected communists in what would become the Foley Square trials, US Attorney John F. X. McGohey called on McDowell to appear before a grand jury in the case after McDowell charged that prosecutors deliberately drew up the indictments in such a way that the charges would not result in a conviction. McDowell later called McGohey and Attorney General Ramsey Clark "inept" in producing the indictments.

In the 1948 election, Harry J. Davenport avenged his 1946 loss and defeated McDowell's bid for re-election.

== Personal life ==
He was married to Virginia McDowell and had one daughter, Patricia.

After leaving Congress, McDowell continued to publish the Wilkinsburg Gazette. On December 11, 1957, he shot himself on his front porch with a .32 caliber revolver. Media reports suggested that McDowell had been diagnosed with cancer.

== See also ==
- United States House of Representatives
- House Un-American Activities Committee
- List of members of the House Un-American Activities Committee

== External sources ==
- United States Congress. "John McDowell (id: M000422)". Biographical Directory of the United States Congress.
- The Political Graveyard

U.S. House of Representatives
Preceded by James L. Quinn	Member of the U.S. House of Representatives from Pennsylvania's 31st congressional district 1939–1941	Succeeded by Samuel A. Weiss
Preceded by Howard E. Campbell	Member of the U.S. House of Representatives from Pennsylvania's 29th congressional district 1947–1949	Succeeded by Harry J. Davenport
