= Pennsylvania's 31st congressional district =

Former U.S. House district in Pennsylvania

Coordinates: 40°20′N 80°00′W

- Obsolete district
- Created: 1903
- Eliminated: 1950
- Years active: 1903-1953

Pennsylvania's 31st congressional district was one of Pennsylvania's districts of the United States House of Representatives. It existed from 1903 to 1953.

== Geography ==
Created in 1903, the district served portions of the city of Pittsburgh. The district later expanded to serve portions of Allegheny County

=== Boundaries in 1903 ===
During the 58th Congress, the district served Pittsburgh Wards 1-19 and Ward 23.

=== Boundaries in 1950 ===
During the 81st Congress, the district served Wards 19, 20, 28, 29, 30, and 32 in Pittsburgh and the following portions of Allegheny County.

- Boroughs served by the 31st District
  - Brentwood
  - Bridgeville
  - Carnegie
  - Castle Shannon
  - Coraopolis
  - Crafton
  - Dormont
  - Green Tree
  - Heidelberg
  - Ingram
  - McDonald
    (5th election district)
  - McKees Rocks
  - Mount Oliver
  - Oakdale
  - Rosslyn Farms
  - Thornburg
- Townships served by the 31st District
  - Baldwin
  - Bethel
  - Collier
  - Crescent
  - Findlay
  - Kennedy
  - Moon
  - Mount Lebanon
  - Neville
  - North Fayette
  - Robinson
  - Scott
  - South Fayette
  - Stowe
  - Upper St. Clair

=== Population ===
- 188,099 (1900 census)
- 295,063 (1940 census)

== History ==
This district was created in 1903, then eliminated in 1953.

== List of representatives ==
Representative	Party	Years	Cong ress	Electoral history
District established March 4, 1903
Henry K. Porter (Pittsburgh)	Independent; Republican	March 4, 1903 – March 3, 1905	58th	Elected in 1902. Lost renomination.
James F. Burke (Pittsburgh)	Republican	March 4, 1905 – March 3, 1915	59th 60th 61st 62nd 63rd	Elected in 1904. Re-elected in 1906. Re-elected in 1908. Re-elected in 1910. Re-elected in 1912. Retired.
John M. Morin (Pittsburgh)	Republican	March 4, 1915 – March 3, 1923	64th 65th 66th 67th	Redistricted from the At-large district and re-elected in 1914. Re-elected in 1916. Re-elected in 1918; Re-elected in 1920. Redistricted to the 34th district.
Adam M. Wyant (Greensburg)	Republican	March 4, 1923 – March 3, 1933	68th 69th 70th 71st 72nd	Redistricted from the 22nd district and re-elected in 1922. Re-elected in 1924. Re-elected in 1926. Re-elected in 1928. Re-elected in 1930. Lost re-election.
M. Clyde Kelly (Edgewood)	Republican	March 3, 1933 – January 3, 1935	73rd	Redistricted from the 33rd district and re-elected in 1932. Lost re-election.
James L. Quinn (Braddock)	Democratic	January 3, 1935 – January 3, 1939	74th 75th	Elected in 1934. Re-elected in 1936. Lost re-election.
John McDowell (Wikinsburg)	Republican	January 3, 1939 – January 3, 1941	76th	Elected in 1938. Lost re-election.
Samuel A. Weiss (Glassport)	Democratic	January 3, 1941 – January 3, 1943	77th	Elected in 1940. Redistricted to the 33rd district.
Herman P. Eberharter (Pittsburgh)	Democratic	January 3, 1943 – January 3, 1945	78th	Redistricted from the 32nd district and re-elected in 1942. Redistricted to the 32nd district.
James G. Fulton (Pittsburgh)	Republican	January 3, 1945 – January 3, 1953	79th 80th 81st 82nd	Elected in 1944. Re-elected in 1946. Re-elected in 1948. Re-elected in 1950. Redistricted to the 27th district.
District dissolved January 3, 1953
