= Howard E. Campbell =

American politician (1890–1971)

Howard Edmond Campbell
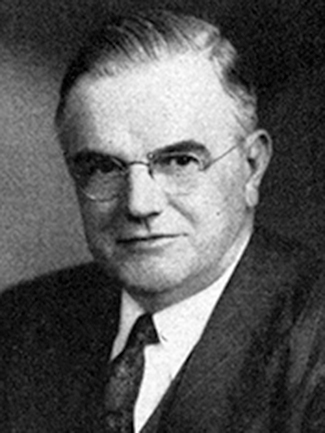

Member of the U.S. House of Representatives from Pennsylvania's 29th district
- In office January 3, 1945 – January 3, 1947
- Preceded by: Robert L. Rodgers
- Succeeded by: John McDowell

Personal details
- Born: January 4, 1890 Pittsburgh, Pennsylvania, US
- Died: January 6, 1971 (aged 81)
- Party: Republican

Howard Edmond Campbell (January 4, 1890 – January 6, 1971) was a Republican member of the U.S. House of Representatives from Pennsylvania.

== Biography ==
Howard E. Campbell was born on January 4, 1890, in Pittsburgh. He attended the public schools and the University of Pittsburgh. He was engaged in the real estate and insurance business in Pittsburgh in 1922, and president of the Pittsburgh Real Estate Board in 1943 and 1944.

Campbell was elected as a Republican to the Seventy-ninth Congress. He was unsuccessful in his bid for renomination to run as the Republican Party candidate for the 80th Congress during the 1946. He was President of East Liberty Chamber of Commerce in 1954 and 1955. He resided in Pittsburgh until his death there on January 6, 1971, aged 81.

== Sources ==
- United States Congress. "Howard E. Campbell (id: C000085)". Biographical Directory of the United States Congress.
- The Political Graveyard

U.S. House of Representatives
Preceded by Robert L. Rodgers	Member of the U.S. House of Representatives from Pennsylvania's 29th congressional district 1945–1947	Succeeded by John McDowell
