= Charles N. Crosby =

American politician and football coach (1876–1951)

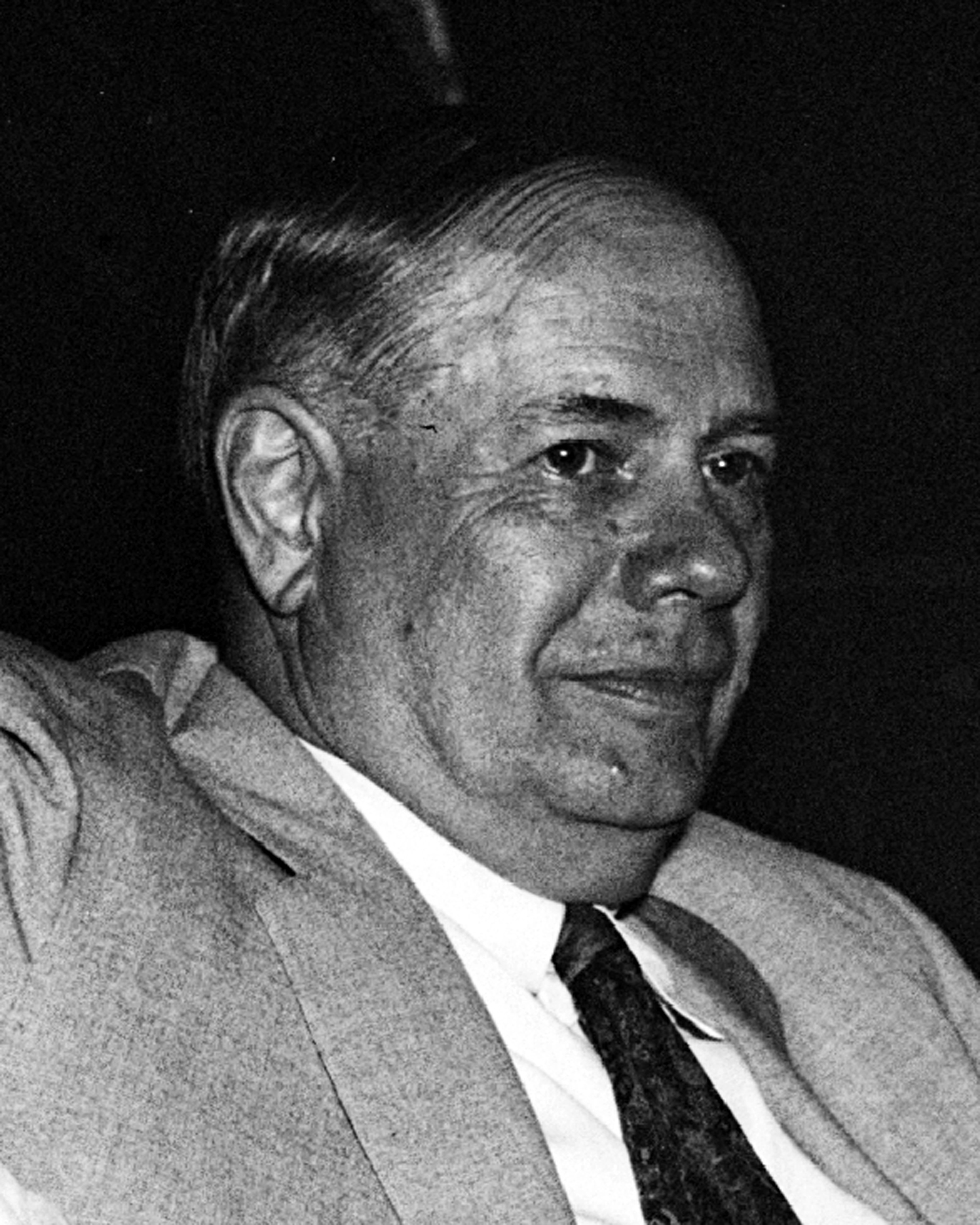
- Charles N. Crosby, US Representative from Pennsylvania

Biographical details
- Born: September 29, 1876; Cherry Valley, Ohio, U.S.
- Died: January 26, 1951 (aged 74); Frederick, Maryland, U.S.

Coaching career (HC unless noted)
- 1897: Allegheny

Head coaching record
- Overall: 0–3

Member of the U.S. House of Representatives from Pennsylvania's 29th district
- In office March 4, 1933 – January 3, 1939
- Preceded by: Milton W. Shreve
- Succeeded by: Robert L. Rodgers

Personal details
- Resting place: Columbia Gardens Cemetery; Arlington, Virginia, U.S.
- Party: Democratic

Charles Noel Crosby (September 29, 1876 – January 26, 1951) was an American politician and college football coach. He was a Democratic member of the U.S. House of Representatives from Pennsylvania.

== Early life ==
Crosby was born in a farming settlement named Cherry Valley, near Andover, Ohio. He attended the New Lyme Institute and Allegheny College in Meadville, Pennsylvania. He attended Western Reserve University in Cleveland, where he was a member for the football team before graduating in 1897. Crosby served as the head football coach at Allegheny College for one season, in 1897, compiling a record of 0–3.

Crosby moved to Linesville, Pennsylvania, in 1901, engaging in the manufacture of silos and in the lumber business. He became engaged in agricultural pursuits in 1914 He was a member of the Linesville and Meadville Boards of Education from 1920 to 1929, and served as president of the Meadville Chamber of Commerce from 1922 to 1924.

== Political career ==
Crosby was elected as a Democrat to the Seventy-third, Seventy-fourth, and Seventy-fifth Congresses representing Pennsylvania's 29th congressional district. He was an unsuccessful candidate for renomination in 1938. He moved to Montgomery County, Maryland, in 1940 and operated a large dairy farm near Clarksburg, Maryland.

He was one of the 53 supporters in Congress along with Fiorello La Guardia in favor of a United States Constitutional amendment giving congressional power to overturn United States Supreme Court decisions.

== Death ==
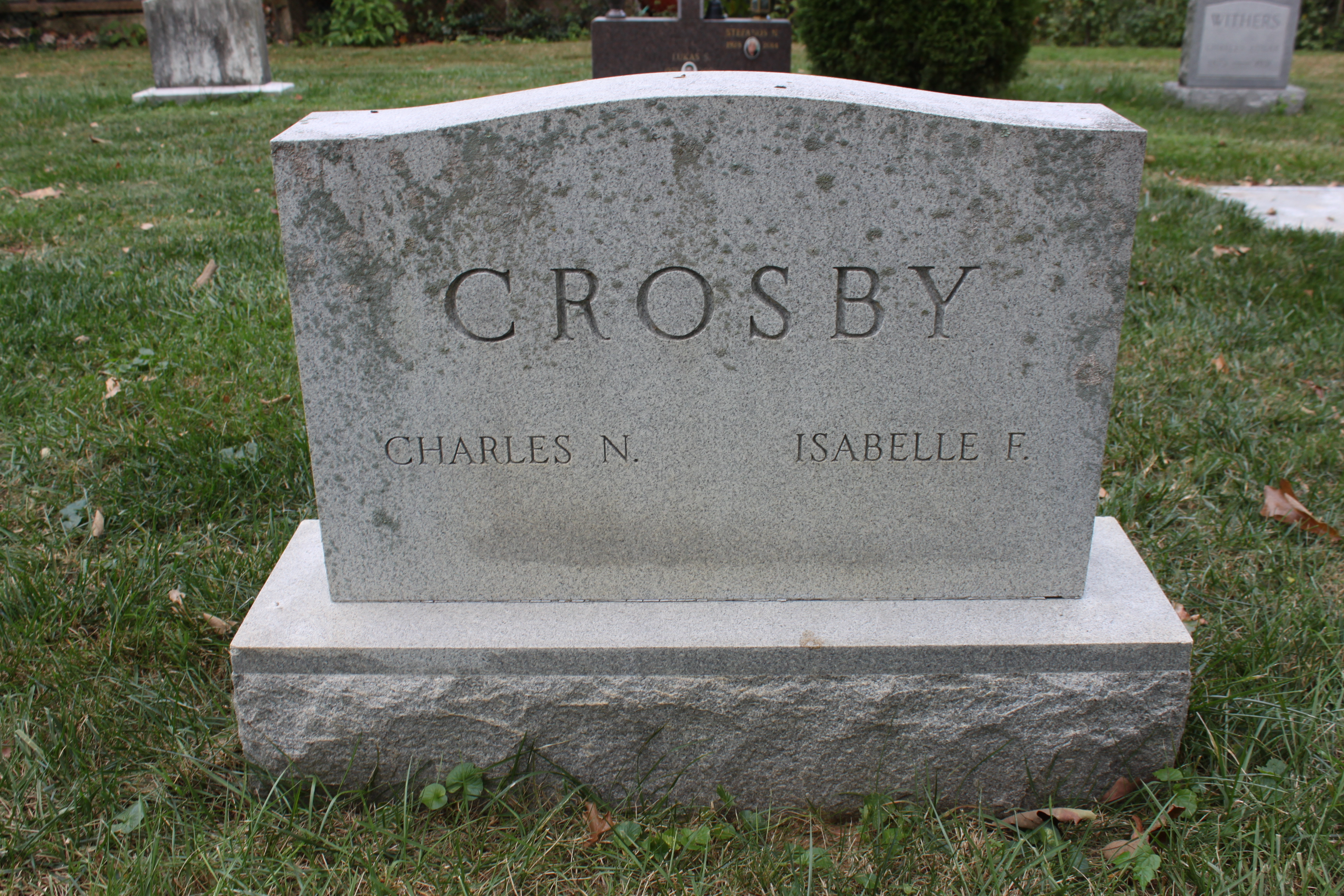
Grave of Crosby in Columbia Gardens Cemetery

Crosby died in Frederick, Maryland, and was interred in Columbia Gardens Cemetery in Arlington, Virginia.

== Head coaching record ==
Year	Team	Overall	Conference	Standing	Bowl/playoffs
Allegheny Gators (Independent) (1897)
1897	Allegheny	0–3			
Allegheny:		0–3			
Total:		0–3			

U.S. House of Representatives
Preceded by Milton W. Shreve	Member of the U.S. House of Representatives from Pennsylvania's 29th congressional district 1933–1939	Succeeded by Robert L. Rodgers
