= Robert L. Rodgers =

American politician

Robert Lewis Rodgers
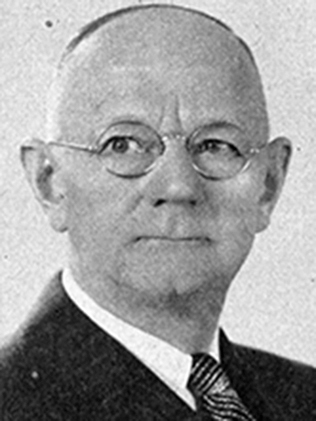

Member of the U.S. House of Representatives from Pennsylvania
- In office January 3, 1939 – January 3, 1947
- Preceded by: Charles N. Crosby (29th); Augustine B. Kelley (28th)
- Succeeded by: Howard E. Campbell (29th); Carroll D. Kearns (28th)
- Constituency: 29th district (1939-45); 28th district (1945-47)

Personal details
- Born: June 2, 1875 El Dorado, Kansas, US
- Died: May 9, 1960 (aged 84) Erie, Pennsylvania, US
- Party: Republican

Robert Lewis Rodgers (June 2, 1875 – May 9, 1960) was a Republican member of the U.S. House of Representatives from Pennsylvania.

Rodgers was born in El Dorado, Kansas. He was raised on a farm near Jamestown, Pennsylvania. During the war with Spain, he enlisted in Company K, Fifteenth Regiment of the Pennsylvania Volunteer Infantry. After his return from service he taught in the district schools and engaged in agricultural pursuits. He moved to Erie, Pennsylvania, in 1914 and engaged in the insurance, real estate, and mortgage business.

Rodgers was elected as a Republican to the Seventy-sixth and to the three succeeding Congresses. He was an unsuccessful candidate for renomination in 1946. He died in Erie Pennsylvania.

U.S. House of Representatives
Preceded by Charles N. Crosby	Member of the U.S. House of Representatives from Pennsylvania's 29th congressional district 1939–1945	Succeeded by Howard E. Campbell
Preceded by Augustine B. Kelley	Member of the U.S. House of Representatives from Pennsylvania's 28th congressional district 1945–1947	Succeeded by Carroll D. Kearns
