= James L. Quinn (politician) =

American politician (1875–1960)

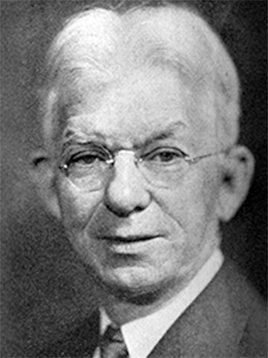

Member of the U.S. House of Representatives from Pennsylvania's 31st district
- In office January 3, 1935 – January 3, 1939
- Preceded by: M. Clyde Kelly
- Succeeded by: John McDowell

Personal details
- Born: James Leland Quinn; September 8, 1875 Emlenton, Pennsylvania, U.S.
- Died: November 12, 1960 (aged 85) Braddock, Pennsylvania, U.S.
- Party: Democratic

James Leland Quinn (September 8, 1875 – November 12, 1960) was an American newspaperman and politician who served two terms as a Democratic member of the U.S. House of Representatives from Pennsylvania from 1935 to 1939.

== Life and career ==
James L. Quinn was born in Emlenton, Pennsylvania. He moved to Braddock, Pennsylvania with his parents in 1880, and attended St. Thomas School.

He was employed as a newspaper reporter from 1891 to 1896, and became owner and publisher of the Braddock Journal in 1896.

=== Political career ===
He was a member of the Pennsylvania State House of Representatives from 1933 to 1935.

In 1934, Quinn was elected as a Democrat to the Seventy-fourth Congress and was re-elected to the Seventy-fifth Congress in 1936. He was an unsuccessful candidate for reelection in 1938.

=== Later career and death ===
After leaving Congress, he resumed the newspaper publishing business.

He died in Braddock, Pennsylvania, and is interred in Braddock Catholic Cemetery.

== Sources ==
- United States Congress. "James Leland Quinn (id: Q000017)". Biographical Directory of the United States Congress.
- The Political Graveyard

U.S. House of Representatives
Preceded by M. Clyde Kelly	Member of the U.S. House of Representatives from Pennsylvania's 31st congressional district 1935–1939	Succeeded by John McDowell
