= List of United States representatives in the 74th Congress =

This is a complete list of United States representatives during the 74th United States Congress listed by seniority.

As an historical article, the districts and party affiliations listed reflect those during the 74th Congress (January 3, 1935 – January 3, 1937). Seats and party affiliations on similar lists for other congresses will be different for certain members.

Seniority depends on the date on which members were sworn into office. Since many members are sworn in on the same day, subsequent ranking is based on previous congressional service of the individual and then by alphabetical order by the last name of the representative.

Committee chairmanship in the House is often associated with seniority. However, party leadership is typically not associated with seniority.

Note: The "*" indicates that the representative/delegate may have served one or more non-consecutive terms while in the House of Representatives of the United States Congress.

== U.S. House seniority list ==
U.S. House seniority
Rank	Representative	Party	District	Seniority date (Previous service, if any)	No.# of term(s)	Notes
1	Adolph J. Sabath	D	IL-05	March 4, 1907	15th term	Dean of the House
2	Joseph W. Byrns Sr.	D	TN-05	March 4, 1909	14th term	Speaker of the House; Died on June 4, 1936.
3	Edward T. Taylor	D	CO-04	March 4, 1909	14th term	
4	Robert L. Doughton	D	NC-09	March 4, 1911	13th term	
5	Carl E. Mapes	R	MI-05	March 4, 1913	12th term	
6	Andrew Jackson Montague	D	VA-03	March 4, 1913	12th term	
7	Sam Rayburn	D	TX-04	March 4, 1913	12th term	
8	Hatton W. Sumners	D	TX-05	March 4, 1913	12th term	
9	Allen T. Treadway	R	MA-01	March 4, 1913	12th term	
10	James P. Buchanan	D	TX-10	April 15, 1913	12th term	
11	Carl Vinson	D	GA-06	November 3, 1914	12th term	
12	Isaac Bacharach	R	NJ-02	March 4, 1915	11th term	Left the House in 1937.
13	John G. Cooper	R	OH-19	March 4, 1915	11th term	Left the House in 1937.
14	George P. Darrow	R	PA-07	March 4, 1915	11th term	Left the House in 1937.
15	George Huddleston	D	AL-09	March 4, 1915	11th term	Left the House in 1937.
16	Frederick R. Lehlbach	R	NJ-12	March 4, 1915	11th term	Left the House in 1937.
17	William Bacon Oliver	D	AL-06	March 4, 1915	11th term	Left the House in 1937.
18	Henry B. Steagall	D	AL-03	March 4, 1915	11th term	
19	George H. Tinkham	R	MA-10	March 4, 1915	11th term	
20	Riley J. Wilson	D	LA-05	March 4, 1915	11th term	Left the House in 1937.
21	Bertrand Snell	R	NY-31	November 2, 1915	11th term	
22	William B. Bankhead	D	AL-07	March 4, 1917	10th term	
23	John Marvin Jones	D	TX-18	March 4, 1917	10th term	
24	Harold Knutson	R	MN-06	March 4, 1917	10th term	
25	Clarence F. Lea	D	CA-01	March 4, 1917	10th term	
26	Joseph J. Mansfield	D	TX-09	March 4, 1917	10th term	
27	Christopher D. Sullivan	D	NY-13	March 4, 1917	10th term	
28	Anthony J. Griffin	D	NY-22	March 5, 1918	10th term	Died on January 13, 1935.
29	S. Otis Bland	D	VA-01	July 2, 1918	10th term	
30	Frank Crowther	R	NY-30	March 4, 1919	9th term	
31	Thomas H. Cullen	D	NY-04	March 4, 1919	9th term	
32	John McDuffie	D	AL-01	March 4, 1919	9th term	Resigned on March 2, 1935.
33	James M. Mead	D	NY-42	March 4, 1919	9th term	
34	Daniel A. Reed	R	NY-43	March 4, 1919	9th term	
35	J. Will Taylor	R	TN-02	March 4, 1919	9th term	
36	Fritz G. Lanham	D	TX-12	April 19, 1919	9th term	
37	Patrick H. Drewry	D	VA-04	April 27, 1920	9th term	
38	Hamilton Fish Jr.	R	NY-26	November 2, 1920	9th term	
39	Harry C. Ransley	R	PA-01	November 2, 1920	9th term	Left the House in 1937.
40	William J. Driver	D	AR-01	March 4, 1921	8th term	
41	Hampton P. Fulmer	D	SC-02	March 4, 1921	8th term	
42	Thomas Alan Goldsborough	D	MD-01	March 4, 1921	8th term	
43	John J. McSwain	D	SC-04	March 4, 1921	8th term	Died on August 6, 1936.
44	Tilman B. Parks	D	AR-07	March 4, 1921	8th term	Left the House in 1937.
45	Randolph Perkins	R	NJ-07	March 4, 1921	8th term	Died on May 25, 1936.
46	John E. Rankin	D	MS-01	March 4, 1921	8th term	
47	Morgan G. Sanders	D	TX-03	March 4, 1921	8th term	
48	John N. Sandlin	D	LA-04	March 4, 1921	8th term	Left the House in 1937.
49	Roy O. Woodruff	R	MI-10	March 4, 1921; Previous service, 1913–1915.	9th term*	
50	A. Piatt Andrew	R	MA-06	September 27, 1921	8th term	Died on June 3, 1936.
51	Charles L. Gifford	R	MA-15	November 7, 1922	8th term	
52	William W. Arnold	D	IL-23	March 4, 1923	7th term	Resigned on September 16, 1935.
53	Robert L. Bacon	R	NY-01	March 4, 1923	7th term	
54	Sol Bloom	D	NY-19	March 4, 1923	7th term	
55	John J. Boylan	D	NY-15	March 4, 1923	7th term	
56	Clarence Cannon	D	MO-09	March 4, 1923	7th term	
57	Emanuel Celler	D	NY-10	March 4, 1923	7th term	
58	William P. Connery Jr.	D	MA-07	March 4, 1923	7th term	
59	Parker Corning	D	NY-28	March 4, 1923	7th term	Left the House in 1937.
60	Robert Crosser	D	OH-21	March 4, 1923; Previous service, 1913–1919.	10th term*	
61	Samuel Dickstein	D	NY-12	March 4, 1923	7th term	
62	Allard H. Gasque	D	SC-06	March 4, 1923	7th term	
63	Arthur H. Greenwood	D	IN-07	March 4, 1923	7th term	
64	Luther Alexander Johnson	D	TX-06	March 4, 1923	7th term	
65	Clarence J. McLeod	R	MI-13	March 4, 1923; Previous service, 1920–1921.	8th term*	Left the House in 1937.
66	Samuel Davis McReynolds	D	TN-03	March 4, 1923	7th term	
67	Milton A. Romjue	D	MO-01	March 4, 1923; Previous service, 1917–1921.	9th term*	
68	George N. Seger	R	NJ-08	March 4, 1923	7th term	
69	John Taber	R	NY-36	March 4, 1923	7th term	
70	Mell G. Underwood	D	OH-11	March 4, 1923	7th term	Resigned on April 10, 1936.
71	Clifton A. Woodrum	D	VA-06	March 4, 1923	7th term	
72	J. Lister Hill	D	AL-02	August 14, 1923	7th term	
73	Samuel B. Hill	D	WA-05	September 25, 1923	7th term	Resigned on June 25, 1936.
74	John H. Kerr	D	NC-02	November 6, 1923	7th term	
75	John J. O'Connor	D	NY-16	November 6, 1923	7th term	
76	Stephen Warfield Gambrill	D	MD-05	November 4, 1924	7th term	
77	Albert E. Carter	R	CA-06	March 4, 1925	6th term	
78	Edward E. Cox	D	GA-02	March 4, 1925	6th term	
79	Charles Aubrey Eaton	R	NJ-05	March 4, 1925	6th term	
80	Robert A. Green	D	FL-02	March 4, 1925	6th term	
81	Thomas A. Jenkins	R	OH-10	March 4, 1925	6th term	
82	Florence Prag Kahn	R	CA-04	March 4, 1925	6th term	Left the House in 1937.
83	Joseph William Martin Jr.	R	MA-14	March 4, 1925	6th term	
84	Thomas S. McMillan	D	SC-01	March 4, 1925	6th term	
85	Mary Teresa Norton	D	NJ-13	March 4, 1925	6th term	
86	Andrew Lawrence Somers	D	NY-06	March 4, 1925	6th term	
87	Lloyd Thurston	R	IA-05	March 4, 1925	6th term	
88	Lindsay Carter Warren	D	NC-01	March 4, 1925	6th term	
89	William Madison Whittington	D	MS-03	March 4, 1925	6th term	
90	Edith Nourse Rogers	R	MA-05	June 30, 1925	6th term	
91	Harry Lane Englebright	R	CA-02	August 31, 1926	6th term	
92	Richard J. Welch	R	CA-05	August 31, 1926	6th term	
93	John J. Cochran	D	MO-13	November 2, 1926	6th term	
94	John T. Buckbee	R	IL-12	March 4, 1927	5th term	Died on April 23, 1936.
95	Wilburn Cartwright	D	OK-03	March 4, 1927	5th term	
96	Isaac Hoffer Doutrich	R	PA-19	March 4, 1927	5th term	Left the House in 1937.
97	James M. Fitzpatrick	D	NY-24	March 4, 1927	5th term	
98	William Voris Gregory	D	KY-01	March 4, 1927	5th term	Died on October 10, 1936.
99	Ulysses Samuel Guyer	R	KS-02	March 4, 1927; Previous service, 1924–1925.	6th term*	
100	Clifford R. Hope	R	KS-07	March 4, 1927	5th term	
101	Jed Johnson	D	OK-06	March 4, 1927	5th term	
102	Vincent Luke Palmisano	D	MD-03	March 4, 1927	5th term	
103	William I. Sirovich	D	NY-14	March 4, 1927	5th term	
104	Malcolm C. Tarver	D	GA-07	March 4, 1927	5th term	
105	Charles A. Wolverton	R	NJ-01	March 4, 1927	5th term	
106	René L. De Rouen	D	LA-07	August 23, 1927	5th term	
107	Clarence E. Hancock	R	NY-35	November 8, 1927	5th term	
108	Francis D. Culkin	R	NY-32	November 6, 1928	5th term	
109	John William McCormack	D	MA-12	November 6, 1928	5th term	
110	Richard B. Wigglesworth	R	MA-13	November 6, 1928	5th term	
111	James Wolfenden	R	PA-08	November 6, 1928	5th term	
112	Chester C. Bolton	R	OH-22	March 4, 1929	4th term	Left the House in 1937.
113	William F. Brunner	D	NY-02	March 4, 1929	4th term	Resigned on September 27, 1935.
114	J. Bayard Clark	D	NC-07	March 4, 1929	4th term	
115	Jere Cooper	D	TN-08	March 4, 1929	4th term	
116	Oliver H. Cross	D	TX-11	March 4, 1929	4th term	Left the House in 1937.
117	Wall Doxey	D	MS-02	March 4, 1929	4th term	
118	Claude A. Fuller	D	AR-03	March 4, 1929	4th term	
119	Fred A. Hartley	R	NJ-10	March 4, 1929	4th term	
120	William E. Hess	R	OH-02	March 4, 1929	4th term	Left the House in 1937.
121	William P. Lambertson	R	KS-01	March 4, 1929	4th term	
122	Louis Ludlow	D	IN-12	March 4, 1929	4th term	
123	Wright Patman	D	TX-01	March 4, 1929	4th term	
124	Joe L. Smith	D	WV-06	March 4, 1929	4th term	
125	Charles Murray Turpin	R	PA-12	June 4, 1929	4th term	Left the House in 1937.
126	Numa F. Montet	D	LA-03	August 6, 1929	4th term	Left the House in 1937.
127	Robert Ramspeck	D	GA-05	October 2, 1929	4th term	
128	Paul John Kvale	R	MN-07	October 16, 1929	4th term	
129	Joseph A. Gavagan	D	NY-21	November 5, 1929	4th term	
130	J. Roland Kinzer	R	PA-10	January 28, 1930	4th term	
131	William J. Granfield	D	MA-02	February 11, 1930	4th term	Left the House in 1937.
132	Martin J. Kennedy	D	NY-18	April 11, 1930	4th term	
133	Thomas L. Blanton	D	TX-17	May 20, 1930; Previous service, 1917–1929.	10th term*	Left the House in 1937.
134	Francis B. Condon	D	RI-01	November 4, 1930	4th term	Resigned on January 10, 1935.
135	Franklin Wills Hancock Jr.	D	NC-05	November 4, 1930	4th term	
136	Claude V. Parsons	D	IL-24	November 4, 1930	4th term	
137	Michael Reilly	D	WI-06	November 4, 1930; Previous service, 1913–1917.	6th term*	
138	Robert F. Rich	R	PA-16	November 4, 1930	4th term	
139	Stephen A. Rudd	D	NY-09	February 17, 1931	4th term	Died on March 31, 1936.
140	Walter G. Andrews	R	NY-40	March 4, 1931	3rd term	
141	Harry P. Beam	D	IL-04	March 4, 1931	3rd term	
142	John W. Boehne Jr.	D	IN-08	March 4, 1931	3rd term	
143	Gerald J. Boileau	P	WI-07	March 4, 1931	3rd term	
144	Patrick J. Boland	D	PA-11	March 4, 1931	3rd term	
145	Alfred L. Bulwinkle	D	NC-10	March 4, 1931; Previous service, 1921–1929.	7th term*	
146	Thomas G. Burch	D	VA-05	March 4, 1931	3rd term	
147	Cap R. Carden	D	KY-04	March 4, 1931	3rd term	Died on June 13, 1935.
148	Glover H. Cary	D	KY-02	March 4, 1931	3rd term	Died on December 5, 1936.
149	Peter Angelo Cavicchia	R	NJ-11	March 4, 1931	3rd term	Left the House in 1937.
150	Virgil Chapman	D	KY-07	March 4, 1931; Previous service, 1925–1929.	5th term*	
151	William Purington Cole Jr.	D	MD-02	March 4, 1931; Previous service, 1927–1929.	4th term*	
152	Eugene B. Crowe	D	IN-09	March 4, 1931	3rd term	
153	Martin Dies Jr.	D	TX-02	March 4, 1931	3rd term	
154	Wesley Ernest Disney	D	OK-01	March 4, 1931	3rd term	
155	Joachim O. Fernández	D	LA-01	March 4, 1931	3rd term	
156	William L. Fiesinger	D	OH-13	March 4, 1931	3rd term	Left the House in 1937.
157	John W. Flannagan Jr.	D	VA-09	March 4, 1931	3rd term	
158	Fred C. Gilchrist	R	IA-08	March 4, 1931	3rd term	
159	Glenn Griswold	D	IN-05	March 4, 1931	3rd term	
160	Harry L. Haines	D	PA-22	March 4, 1931	3rd term	
161	Byron B. Harlan	D	OH-03	March 4, 1931	3rd term	
162	Pehr G. Holmes	R	MA-04	March 4, 1931	3rd term	
163	Bernhard M. Jacobsen	D	IA-02	March 4, 1931	3rd term	Died on June 30, 1936.
164	Edward A. Kelly	D	IL-03	March 4, 1931	3rd term	
165	Kent E. Keller	D	IL-25	March 4, 1931	3rd term	
166	Frank C. Kniffin	D	OH-05	March 4, 1931	3rd term	
167	Walter Lambeth	D	NC-08	March 4, 1931	3rd term	
168	William Larrabee	D	IN-11	March 4, 1931	3rd term	
169	Arthur P. Lamneck	D	OH-12	March 4, 1931	3rd term	
170	David John Lewis	D	MD-06	March 4, 1931; Previous service, 1911–1917.	6th term*	
171	Paul H. Maloney	D	LA-02	March 4, 1931	3rd term	
172	Andrew J. May	D	KY-06	March 4, 1931	3rd term	
173	Charles D. Millard	R	NY-25	March 4, 1931	3rd term	
174	John E. Miller	D	AR-02	March 4, 1931	3rd term	
175	John Ridley Mitchell	D	TN-04	March 4, 1931	3rd term	
176	Samuel B. Pettengill	D	IN-03	March 4, 1931	3rd term	
177	James G. Polk	D	OH-06	March 4, 1931	3rd term	
178	Leonard W. Schuetz	D	IL-07	March 4, 1931	3rd term	
179	Joe Shannon	D	MO-05	March 4, 1931	3rd term	
180	Howard W. Smith	D	VA-08	March 4, 1931	3rd term	
181	Brent Spence	D	KY-05	March 4, 1931	3rd term	
182	William H. Sutphin	D	NJ-03	March 4, 1931	3rd term	
183	R. Ewing Thomason	D	TX-16	March 4, 1931	3rd term	
184	Fred M. Vinson	D	KY-08	March 4, 1931; Previous service, 1924–1929.	6th term*	
185	Zebulon Weaver	D	NC-11	March 4, 1931; Previous service, 1917–1919 and 1919–1929.	9th term**	
186	Clyde Williams	D	MO-08	March 4, 1931; Previous service, 1927–1929.	4th term*	
187	Gardner R. Withrow	R	WI-03	March 4, 1931	3rd term	
188	Jesse P. Wolcott	R	MI-07	March 4, 1931	3rd term	
189	John J. Delaney	D	NY-07	November 3, 1931; Previous service, 1918–1919.	4th term*	
190	John B. Hollister	R	OH-01	November 3, 1931	3rd term	Left the House in 1937.
191	Martin L. Sweeney	D	OH-20	November 3, 1931	3rd term	
192	Richard M. Kleberg	D	TX-14	November 24, 1931	3rd term	
193	William Nathaniel Rogers	D	NH-01	January 5, 1932; Previous service, 1923–1925.	4th term*	Left the House in 1937.
194	Bryant Thomas Castellow	D	GA-03	November 8, 1932	3rd term	Left the House in 1937.
195	Ambrose Jerome Kennedy	D	MD-04	November 8, 1932	3rd term	
196	Joe H. Eagle	D	TX-08	January 28, 1933; Previous service, 1913–1921.	7th term*	Left the House in 1937.
197	J. Leroy Adair	D	IL-15	March 4, 1933	2nd term	Left the House in 1937.
198	Leo E. Allen	R	IL-13	March 4, 1933	2nd term	
199	Roy E. Ayers	D	MT-02	March 4, 1933	2nd term	Left the House in 1937.
200	Alfred F. Beiter	D	NY-41	March 4, 1933	2nd term	
201	William M. Berlin	D	PA-28	March 4, 1933	2nd term	Left the House in 1937.
202	Fred Biermann	D	IA-04	March 4, 1933	2nd term	
203	Martin A. Brennan	D	IL	March 4, 1933	2nd term	Left the House in 1937.
204	J. Twing Brooks	D	PA-30	March 4, 1933	2nd term	Left the House in 1937.
205	Prentiss M. Brown	D	MI-11	March 4, 1933	2nd term	Resigned on November 18, 1936.
206	Frank H. Buck	D	CA-03	March 4, 1933	2nd term	
207	George Burnham	R	CA-20	March 4, 1933	2nd term	Left the House in 1937.
208	Millard F. Caldwell	D	FL-03	March 4, 1933	2nd term	
209	Raymond Joseph Cannon	D	WI-04	March 4, 1933	2nd term	
210	Randolph Carpenter	D	KS-04	March 4, 1933	2nd term	Left the House in 1937.
211	James Robert Claiborne	D	MO-12	March 4, 1933	2nd term	Left the House in 1937.
212	Theodore Christianson	D	MN-05	March 4, 1933	2nd term	Left the House in 1937.
213	Charles J. Colden	D	CA-17	March 4, 1933	2nd term	
214	Sam L. Collins	R	CA-19	March 4, 1933	2nd term	Left the House in 1937.
215	William M. Colmer	D	MS-06	March 4, 1933	2nd term	
216	William B. Cravens	D	AR-04	March 4, 1933; Previous service, 1907–1913.	5th term*	
217	Charles N. Crosby	D	PA-29	March 4, 1933	2nd term	
218	Fred N. Cummings	D	CO-02	March 4, 1933	2nd term	
219	Colgate Darden	D	VA-02	March 4, 1933	2nd term	Left the House in 1937.
220	Cleveland Dear	D	LA-08	March 4, 1933	2nd term	Left the House in 1937.
221	Braswell Deen	D	GA-08	March 4, 1933	2nd term	
222	John D. Dingell Sr.	D	MI-15	March 4, 1933	2nd term	
223	Everett Dirksen	R	IL-16	March 4, 1933	2nd term	
224	J. William Ditter	R	PA-17	March 4, 1933	2nd term	
225	Donald C. Dobbins	D	IL-19	March 4, 1933	2nd term	Left the House in 1937.
226	John F. Dockweiler	D	CA-16	March 4, 1933	2nd term	
227	George Anthony Dondero	R	MI-17	March 4, 1933	2nd term	
228	Warren J. Duffey	D	OH-09	March 4, 1933	2nd term	Died on July 7, 1936.
229	Richard M. Duncan	D	MO-03	March 4, 1933	2nd term	
230	Matthew A. Dunn	D	PA-34	March 4, 1933	2nd term	
231	Edward C. Eicher	D	IA-01	March 4, 1933	2nd term	
232	Henry Ellenbogen	D	PA-33	March 4, 1933	2nd term	
233	Charles I. Faddis	D	PA-25	March 4, 1933	2nd term	
234	James I. Farley	D	IN-04	March 4, 1933	2nd term	
235	Thomas B. Fletcher	D	OH-08	March 4, 1933; Previous service, 1925–1929.	4th term*	
236	Benjamin K. Focht	R	PA-18	March 4, 1933; Previous service, 1907–1913 and 1915–1923.	9th term**	
237	Thomas F. Ford	D	CA-14	March 4, 1933	2nd term	
238	Guy M. Gillette	D	IA-09	March 4, 1933	2nd term	Resigned on November 3, 1936.
239	Finly Hutchinson Gray	D	IN-10	March 4, 1933; Previous service, 1911–1917.	5th term*	
240	Philip A. Goodwin	R	NY-27	March 4, 1933	2nd term	
241	Dow W. Harter	D	OH-14	March 4, 1933	2nd term	
242	Arthur Daniel Healey	D	MA-08	March 4, 1933	2nd term	
243	William L. Higgins	R	CT-02	March 4, 1933	2nd term	Left the House in 1937.
244	Fred H. Hildebrandt	D	SD-01	March 4, 1933	2nd term	
245	Knute Hill	D	WA-04	March 4, 1933	2nd term	
246	John H. Hoeppel	D	CA-12	March 4, 1933	2nd term	Left the House in 1937.
247	Lawrence E. Imhoff	D	OH-18	March 4, 1933	2nd term	
248	Virginia E. Jenckes	D	IN-06	March 4, 1933	2nd term	
249	George W. Johnson	D	WV-04	March 4, 1933; Previous service, 1923–1925.	3rd term*	
250	John Kee	D	WV-05	March 4, 1933	2nd term	
251	Edward Aloysius Kenney	D	NJ-09	March 4, 1933	2nd term	
252	Leo Kocialkowski	D	IL-08	March 4, 1933	2nd term	
253	Herman P. Kopplemann	D	CT-01	March 4, 1933	2nd term	
254	Charles Kramer	D	CA-13	March 4, 1933	2nd term	
255	Frank Le Blond Kloeb	D	OH-04	March 4, 1933	2nd term	
256	William Lemke	R	ND	March 4, 1933	2nd term	
257	John Lesinski Sr.	D	MI-16	March 4, 1933	2nd term	
258	Lawrence Lewis	D	CO-01	March 4, 1933	2nd term	
259	Wesley Lloyd	D	WA-06	March 4, 1933	2nd term	Died on January 10, 1936.
260	Ernest Lundeen	R	MN-03	March 4, 1933; Previous service, 1917–1919.	3rd term*	Left the House in 1937.
261	Leroy T. Marshall	R	OH-07	March 4, 1933	2nd term	Left the House in 1937.
262	John Andrew Martin	D	CO-03	March 4, 1933; Previous service, 1909–1913.	4th term*	
263	William D. McFarlane	D	TX-13	March 4, 1933	2nd term	
264	John J. McGrath	D	CA-08	March 4, 1933	2nd term	
265	Donald H. McLean	R	NJ-06	March 4, 1933	2nd term	
266	James A. Meeks	D	IL-18	March 4, 1933	2nd term	
267	Schuyler Merritt	R	CT-04	March 4, 1933; Previous service, 1917–1931.	9th term*	Left the House in 1937.
268	Joseph P. Monaghan	D	MT-01	March 4, 1933	2nd term	Left the House in 1937.
269	Edward C. Moran Jr.	D	ME-02	March 4, 1933	2nd term	Left the House in 1937.
270	James W. Mott	R	OR-01	March 4, 1933	2nd term	
271	Orrice Abram Murdock Jr.	D	UT-01	March 4, 1933	2nd term	
272	Thomas J. O'Brien	D	IL-06	March 4, 1933	2nd term	
273	John Matthew O'Connell	D	RI-02	March 4, 1933	2nd term	
274	Thomas O'Malley	D	WI-05	March 4, 1933	2nd term	
275	Emmett Marshall Owen	D	GA-04	March 4, 1933	2nd term	
276	J. Hardin Peterson	D	FL-01	March 4, 1933	2nd term	
277	Theodore A. Peyser	D	NY-17	March 4, 1933	2nd term	
278	Walter M. Pierce	D	OR-02	March 4, 1933	2nd term	
279	D. Lane Powers	R	NJ-04	March 4, 1933	2nd term	
280	Robert L. Ramsay	D	WV-01	March 4, 1933	2nd term	
281	Jennings Randolph	D	WV-02	March 4, 1933	2nd term	
282	B. Carroll Reece	R	TN-01	March 4, 1933; Previous service, 1921–1931.	7th term*	
283	James P. Richards	D	SC-05	March 4, 1933	2nd term	
284	William Emanuel Richardson	D	PA-14	March 4, 1933	2nd term	Left the House in 1937.
285	Absalom Willis Robertson	D	VA-07	March 4, 1933	2nd term	
286	J. W. Robinson	D	UT-02	March 4, 1933	2nd term	
287	Will Rogers	D	OK	March 4, 1933	2nd term	
288	George G. Sadowski	D	MI-01	March 4, 1933	2nd term	
289	Edwin M. Schaefer	D	IL-22	March 4, 1933	2nd term	
290	William T. Schulte	D	IN-01	March 4, 1933	2nd term	
291	James G. Scrugham	D	NV	March 4, 1933	2nd term	
292	William J. Sears	D	FL	March 4, 1933; Previous service, 1915–1929.	9th term*	Left the House in 1937.
293	Robert T. Secrest	D	OH-15	March 4, 1933	2nd term	
294	Fred Sisson	D	NY-33	March 4, 1933	2nd term	Left the House in 1937.
295	J. Buell Snyder	D	PA-24	March 4, 1933	2nd term	
296	Martin F. Smith	D	WA-03	March 4, 1933	2nd term	
297	Henry E. Stubbs	D	CA-10	March 4, 1933	2nd term	
298	John C. Taylor	D	SC-03	March 4, 1933	2nd term	
299	William R. Thom	D	OH-16	March 4, 1933	2nd term	
300	Chester C. Thompson	D	IL-14	March 4, 1933	2nd term	
301	Charles W. Tobey	R	NH-02	March 4, 1933	2nd term	
302	Charles V. Truax	D	OH	March 4, 1933	2nd term	Died on August 9, 1935.
303	Clarence W. Turner	D	TN-06	March 4, 1933; Previous service, 1922–1923.	3rd term*	
304	William B. Umstead	D	NC-06	March 4, 1933	2nd term	
305	James Wolcott Wadsworth Jr.	R	NY-39	March 4, 1933	2nd term	
306	Monrad Wallgren	D	WA-02	March 4, 1933	2nd term	
307	Francis E. Walter	D	PA-21	March 4, 1933	2nd term	
308	Otha Wearin	D	IA-07	March 4, 1933	2nd term	
309	Theodore B. Werner	D	SD-02	March 4, 1933	2nd term	Left the House in 1937.
310	Compton I. White	D	ID-01	March 4, 1933	2nd term	
311	J. Mark Wilcox	D	FL-04	March 4, 1933	2nd term	
312	Reuben T. Wood	D	MO-06	March 4, 1933	2nd term	
313	Stephen M. Young	D	OH	March 4, 1933	2nd term	Left the House in 1937.
314	Marion Zioncheck	D	WA-01	March 4, 1933	2nd term	Died on August 7, 1936.
315	Milton H. West	D	TX-15	April 23, 1933	2nd term	
316	Paul Brown	D	GA-10	July 5, 1933	2nd term	
317	Isabella Greenway	D	AZ	October 3, 1933	2nd term	Left the House in 1937.
318	Oliver W. Frey	D	PA-09	November 7, 1933	2nd term	
319	Archibald Hill Carmichael	D	AL-08	November 14, 1933	2nd term	Left the House in 1937.
320	Andrew Edmiston Jr.	D	WV-03	November 28, 1933	2nd term	
321	David D. Terry	D	AR-05	December 19, 1933	2nd term	
322	Charles Albert Plumley	R	VT	January 16, 1934	2nd term	
323	William D. Thomas	R	NY-29	January 30, 1934	2nd term	Died on May 17, 1936.
324	Jared Y. Sanders Jr.	D	LA-06	May 1, 1934	2nd term	Left the House in 1937.
325	Harold D. Cooley	D	NC-04	July 7, 1934	2nd term	
326	Thomas Ryum Amlie	R	WI-01	January 3, 1935; Previous service, 1931–1933.	2nd term*	
327	August H. Andresen	R	MN-01	January 3, 1935; Previous service, 1925–1933.	5th term*	
328	Leslie C. Arends	R	IL-17	January 3, 1935	1st term	
329	William A. Ashbrook	D	OH-17	January 3, 1935; Previous service, 1907–1921.	8th term*	
330	Graham Arthur Barden	D	NC-03	January 3, 1935	1st term	
331	C. Jasper Bell	D	MO-04	January 3, 1935	1st term	
332	Charles Gustav Binderup	R	NE-04	January 3, 1935	1st term	
333	William W. Blackney	R	MI-06	January 3, 1935	1st term	Left the House in 1937.
334	Owen Brewster	R	ME-03	January 3, 1935	1st term	
335	Rich T. Buckler	D	MN-09	January 3, 1935	1st term	
336	Charles A. Buckley	D	NY-23	January 3, 1935	1st term	
337	Usher Burdick	R	ND	January 3, 1935	1st term	
338	Frank Carlson	R	KS-06	January 3, 1935	1st term	
339	Joseph E. Casey	D	MA-03	January 3, 1935	1st term	
340	Walter Chandler	D	TN-09	January 3, 1935	1st term	
341	Ralph E. Church	R	IL-10	January 3, 1935	1st term	
342	William M. Citron	D	CT	January 3, 1935	1st term	
343	David Worth Clark	D	ID-02	January 3, 1935	1st term	
344	Harry B. Coffee	D	NE-05	January 3, 1935	1st term	
345	W. Sterling Cole	R	NY-37	January 3, 1935	1st term	
346	John M. Costello	D	CA-15	January 3, 1935	1st term	
347	Fred L. Crawford	R	MI-08	January 3, 1935	1st term	
348	J. Burrwood Daly	D	PA-04	January 3, 1935	1st term	
349	John J. Dempsey	D	NM	January 3, 1935	1st term	
350	Charles E. Dietrich	D	PA-15	January 3, 1935	1st term	Left the House in 1937.
351	Frank Joseph Gerard Dorsey	D	PA-05	January 3, 1935	1st term	
352	Denis J. Driscoll	D	PA-20	January 3, 1935	1st term	Left the House in 1937.
353	James P.B. Duffy	D	NY-38	January 3, 1935	1st term	Left the House in 1937.
354	Aubert C. Dunn	D	MS-05	January 3, 1935	1st term	Left the House in 1937.
355	Charles R. Eckert	D	PA-26	January 3, 1935	1st term	
356	William A. Ekwall	R	OR-03	January 3, 1935	1st term	Left the House in 1937.
357	Albert J. Engel	D	MI-09	January 3, 1935	1st term	
358	Marcellus H. Evans	D	NY-05	January 3, 1935	1st term	
359	Clare G. Fenerty	R	PA-03	January 3, 1935	1st term	Left the House in 1937.
360	Phil Ferguson	D	OK-08	January 3, 1935	1st term	
361	Aaron L. Ford	D	MS-04	January 3, 1935	1st term	
362	Percy Lee Gassaway	D	OK-04	January 3, 1935	1st term	Left the House in 1937.
363	Bertrand W. Gearhart	R	CA-09	January 3, 1935	1st term	
364	Bernard J. Gehrmann	P	WI-10	January 3, 1935	1st term	
365	James H. Gildea	D	PA-13	January 3, 1935	1st term	
366	Don Hilary Gingery	D	PA-23	January 3, 1935	1st term	
367	Joseph Anthony Gray	D	PA-27	January 3, 1935	1st term	
368	Paul Ranous Greever	D	WY	January 3, 1935	1st term	
369	John W. Gwynne	R	IA-03	January 3, 1935	1st term	
370	Henry M. Kimball	R	MI-03	January 3, 1935	1st term	Died on October 19, 1935.
371	Simon M. Hamlin	D	ME-01	January 3, 1935	1st term	Left the House in 1937.
372	Edward J. Hart	D	NJ-14	January 3, 1935	1st term	
373	Thomas C. Hennings Jr.	D	MO-11	January 3, 1935	1st term	
374	John Patrick Higgins	D	MA-11	January 3, 1935	1st term	
375	Sam Hobbs	D	AL-04	January 3, 1935	1st term	
376	Clare Hoffman	R	MI-04	January 3, 1935	1st term	
377	Frank Eugene Hook	D	MI-12	January 3, 1935	1st term	
378	John Mills Houston	D	KS-05	January 3, 1935	1st term	
379	Merlin Hull	R	WI-09	January 3, 1935; Previous service, 1929–1931.	2nd term*	
380	Michael L. Igoe	D	IL	January 3, 1935	1st term	Resigned on June 2, 1935.
381	Joshua B. Lee	D	OK-05	January 3, 1935	1st term	Left the House in 1937.
382	Bert Lord	R	NY-34	January 3, 1935	1st term	
383	Scott W. Lucas	D	IL-20	January 3, 1935	1st term	
384	Henry Carl Luckey	D	NE-01	January 3, 1935	1st term	
385	Melvin Maas	R	MN-04	January 3, 1935; Previous service, 1927–1933.	4th term*	
386	Maury Maverick	D	TX-20	January 3, 1935	1st term	
387	Vito Marcantonio	R	NY-20	January 3, 1935	1st term	Left the House in 1937.
388	Sam C. Massingale	D	OK-07	January 3, 1935	1st term	
389	Harry H. Mason	D	IL-21	January 3, 1935	1st term	Left the House in 1937.
390	James McAndrews	D	IL-09	January 3, 1935; Previous service, 1901–1905 and 1913–1921.	7th term**	
391	George H. Mahon	D	TX-19	January 3, 1935	1st term	
392	John Little McClellan	D	AR-06	January 3, 1935	1st term	
393	Dan R. McGehee	D	MS-07	January 3, 1935	1st term	
394	John S. McGroarty	D	CA-11	January 3, 1935	1st term	
395	Raymond S. McKeough	D	IL-02	January 3, 1935	1st term	
396	Charles F. McLaughlin	D	NE-02	January 3, 1935	1st term	
397	Matthew J. Merritt	D	NY	January 3, 1935	1st term	
398	Earl C. Michener	R	MI-02	January 3, 1935; Previous service, 1919–1933.	8th term*	
399	Arthur W. Mitchell	D	IL-01	January 3, 1935	1st term	
400	Theodore L. Moritz	D	PA-32	January 3, 1935	1st term	Left the House in 1937.
401	William L. Nelson	D	MO-02	January 3, 1935; Previous service, 1919–1921 and 1925–1933.	6th term**	
402	John Conover Nichols	D	OK-02	January 3, 1935	1st term	
403	Caroline Love Goodwin O'Day	D	NY	January 3, 1935	1st term	
404	James A. O'Leary	D	NY-11	January 3, 1935	1st term	
405	Emmet O'Neal	D	KY-03	January 3, 1935	1st term	
406	Edward White Patterson	D	KS-03	January 3, 1935	1st term	
407	Nat Patton	D	TX-07	January 3, 1935	1st term	
408	Herron C. Pearson	D	TN-07	January 3, 1935	1st term	
409	Hugh Peterson	D	GA-01	January 3, 1935	1st term	
410	Joseph L. Pfeifer	D	NY-03	January 3, 1935	1st term	
411	William Alvin Pittenger	R	MN-08	January 3, 1935; Previous service, 1929–1933.	3rd term*	Left the House in 1937.
412	James L. Quinn	D	PA-31	January 3, 1935	1st term	
413	Louis C. Rabaut	D	MI-14	January 3, 1935	1st term	
414	Chauncey W. Reed	R	IL-11	January 3, 1935	1st term	
415	John M. Robsion	R	KY-09	January 3, 1935; Previous service, 1919–1930.	7th term*	
416	Richard M. Russell	D	MA-09	January 3, 1935	1st term	Left the House in 1937.
417	Elmer Ryan	D	MN-02	January 3, 1935	1st term	
418	Harry Sauthoff	P	WI-02	January 3, 1935	1st term	
419	George J. Schneider	P	WI-08	January 3, 1935; Previous service, 1923–1933.	6th term*	
420	Byron N. Scott	P	CA-18	January 3, 1935	1st term	
421	James A. Shanley	D	CT-03	January 3, 1935	1st term	
422	Dewey Jackson Short	R	MO-07	January 3, 1935; Previous service, 1929–1931.	2nd term*	
423	J. Joseph Smith	D	CT-05	January 3, 1935	1st term	
424	Charles L. South	D	TX-21	January 3, 1935	1st term	
425	Michael J. Stack	D	PA-06	January 3, 1935	1st term	
426	Joe Starnes	D	AL-05	January 3, 1935	1st term	
427	Karl Stefan	R	NE-03	January 3, 1935	1st term	
428	J. George Stewart	R	DE	January 3, 1935	1st term	Left the House in 1937.
429	John H. Tolan	D	CA-07	January 3, 1935	1st term	
430	Richard J. Tonry	D	NY-08	January 3, 1935	1st term	Left the House in 1937.
431	B. Frank Whelchel	D	GA-09	January 3, 1935	1st term	
432	Hubert Utterback	D	IA-10	January 3, 1935	1st term	Left the House in 1937.
433	William H. Wilson	R	PA-02	January 3, 1935	1st term	Left the House in 1937.
434	Orville Zimmerman	D	MO-10	January 3, 1935	1st term	
	Charles A. Halleck	R	IN-02	January 29, 1935	1st term	
	Frank W. Boykin	D	AL-01	July 30, 1935	1st term	
	Charles Risk	R	RI-01	August 6, 1935	1st term	Left the House in 1937.
	William Bernard Barry	D	NY-02	November 5, 1935	1st term	
	Edward W. Creal	D	KY-04	November 5, 1935	1st term	
	Edward W. Curley	D	NY-22	November 5, 1935	1st term	
	Verner Main	R	MI-03	December 17, 1935	1st term	Left the House in 1937.
	Daniel S. Earhart	D	OH	November 3, 1936	1st term	Left the House in 1937.
	Peter Francis Hammond	D	OH-11	November 3, 1936	1st term	Left the House in 1937.
	Gabriel H. Mahon Jr.	D	SC-04	November 3, 1936	1st term	

== Delegates ==
Rank	Delegate	Party	District	Seniority date (Previous service, if any)	No.# of term(s)	Notes
1	Pedro Guevara	Nac	PHL	March 4, 1923	7th term	
2	Anthony Dimond	D	AK	March 4, 1933	2nd term	
3	Santiago Iglesias	Coalitionist	PR	March 4, 1933	2nd term	
4	Francisco Afan Delgado	Nac	PHL	January 3, 1935	1st term	
5	Samuel Wilder King	R	HI	January 3, 1935	1st term	
	Quintin Paredes	Nac	PHL	February 14, 1936	1st term	

== See also ==
- 74th United States Congress
- List of United States congressional districts
- List of United States senators in the 74th Congress
