= List of United States representatives in the 77th Congress =

This is a complete list of United States representatives during the 77th United States Congress listed by seniority.

As an historical article, the districts and party affiliations listed reflect those during the 77th Congress (January 3, 1941 – January 3, 1943). Seats and party affiliations on similar lists for other congresses will be different for certain members.

Seniority depends on the date on which members were sworn into office. Since many members are sworn in on the same day, subsequent ranking is based on previous congressional service of the individual and then by alphabetical order by the last name of the representative.

Committee chairmanship in the House is often associated with seniority. However, party leadership is typically not associated with seniority.

Note: The "*" indicates that the representative/delegate may have served one or more non-consecutive terms while in the House of Representatives of the United States Congress.

== U.S. House seniority list ==
U.S. House seniority
Rank	Representative	Party	District	Seniority date (Previous service, if any)	No.# of term(s)	Notes
1	Adolph J. Sabath	D	IL-05	March 4, 1907	18th term	Dean of the House
2	Edward T. Taylor	D	CO-04	March 4, 1909	17th term	Died on September 3, 1941.
3	Robert L. Doughton	D	NC-09	March 4, 1911	16th term	
4	Sam Rayburn	D	TX-04	March 4, 1913	15th term	Speaker of the House
5	Hatton W. Sumners	D	TX-05	March 4, 1913	15th term	
6	Allen T. Treadway	R	MA-01	March 4, 1913	15th term	
7	Carl Vinson	D	GA-06	November 3, 1914	15th term	
8	Henry B. Steagall	D	AL-03	March 4, 1915	14th term	
9	George H. Tinkham	R	MA-10	March 4, 1915	14th term	Left the House in 1943.
10	Harold Knutson	R	MN-06	March 4, 1917	13th term	
11	Clarence F. Lea	D	CA-01	March 4, 1917	13th term	
12	Joseph J. Mansfield	D	TX-09	March 4, 1917	13th term	
13	S. Otis Bland	D	VA-01	July 2, 1918	13th term	
14	Frank Crowther	R	NY-30	March 4, 1919	12th term	Left the House in 1943.
15	Thomas H. Cullen	D	NY-04	March 4, 1919	12th term	
16	Daniel A. Reed	R	NY-43	March 4, 1919	12th term	
17	Fritz G. Lanham	D	TX-12	April 19, 1919	12th term	
18	Patrick H. Drewry	D	VA-04	April 27, 1920	12th term	
19	Hamilton Fish Jr.	R	NY-26	November 2, 1920	12th term	
20	Hampton P. Fulmer	D	SC-02	March 4, 1921	11th term	
21	John E. Rankin	D	MS-01	March 4, 1921	11th term	
22	Roy O. Woodruff	R	MI-10	March 4, 1921; Previous service, 1913–1915.	12th term*	
23	Charles L. Gifford	R	MA-15	November 7, 1922	11th term	
24	Sol Bloom	D	NY-19	March 4, 1923	10th term	
25	Clarence Cannon	D	MO-09	March 4, 1923	10th term	
26	Emanuel Celler	D	NY-10	March 4, 1923	10th term	
27	Robert Crosser	D	OH-21	March 4, 1923; Previous service, 1913–1919.	13th term*	
28	Samuel Dickstein	D	NY-12	March 4, 1923	10th term	
29	Luther Alexander Johnson	D	TX-06	March 4, 1923	10th term	
30	Milton A. Romjue	D	MO-01	March 4, 1923; Previous service, 1917–1921.	12th term*	Left the House in 1943.
31	John Taber	R	NY-36	March 4, 1923	10th term	
32	Clifton A. Woodrum	D	VA-06	March 4, 1923	10th term	
33	John H. Kerr	D	NC-02	November 6, 1923	10th term	
34	Albert E. Carter	R	CA-06	March 4, 1925	9th term	
35	Edward E. Cox	D	GA-02	March 4, 1925	9th term	
36	Charles Aubrey Eaton	R	NJ-05	March 4, 1925	9th term	
37	Robert A. Green	D	FL-02	March 4, 1925	9th term	
38	Thomas A. Jenkins	R	OH-10	March 4, 1925	9th term	
39	Joseph William Martin Jr.	R	MA-14	March 4, 1925	9th term	
40	Mary Teresa Norton	D	NJ-13	March 4, 1925	9th term	
41	Andrew Lawrence Somers	D	NY-06	March 4, 1925	9th term	
42	William Madison Whittington	D	MS-03	March 4, 1925	9th term	
43	Edith Nourse Rogers	R	MA-05	June 30, 1925	9th term	
44	Harry Lane Englebright	R	CA-02	August 31, 1926	9th term	
45	Richard J. Welch	R	CA-05	August 31, 1926	9th term	
46	John J. Cochran	D	MO-13	November 2, 1926	9th term	
47	Wilburn Cartwright	D	OK-03	March 4, 1927	8th term	Left the House in 1943.
48	James M. Fitzpatrick	D	NY-24	March 4, 1927	8th term	
49	Ulysses Samuel Guyer	R	KS-02	March 4, 1927; Previous service, 1924–1925.	9th term*	
50	Clifford R. Hope	R	KS-07	March 4, 1927	8th term	
51	Jed Johnson	D	OK-06	March 4, 1927	8th term	
52	Malcolm C. Tarver	D	GA-07	March 4, 1927	8th term	
53	Charles A. Wolverton	R	NJ-01	March 4, 1927	8th term	
54	Clarence E. Hancock	R	NY-35	November 8, 1927	8th term	
55	Francis D. Culkin	R	NY-32	November 6, 1928	8th term	
56	John William McCormack	D	MA-12	November 6, 1928	8th term	
57	Richard B. Wigglesworth	R	MA-13	November 6, 1928	8th term	
58	James Wolfenden	R	PA-08	November 6, 1928	8th term	
59	J. Bayard Clark	D	NC-07	March 4, 1929	7th term	
60	Jere Cooper	D	TN-08	March 4, 1929	7th term	
61	Wall Doxey	D	MS-02	March 4, 1929	7th term	Resigned on September 28, 1941.
62	Fred A. Hartley	R	NJ-10	March 4, 1929	7th term	
63	William P. Lambertson	R	KS-01	March 4, 1929	7th term	
64	Louis Ludlow	D	IN-12	March 4, 1929	7th term	
65	Wright Patman	D	TX-01	March 4, 1929	7th term	
66	Joe L. Smith	D	WV-06	March 4, 1929	7th term	
67	Robert Ramspeck	D	GA-05	October 2, 1929	7th term	
68	Joseph A. Gavagan	D	NY-21	November 5, 1929	7th term	
69	J. Roland Kinzer	R	PA-10	January 28, 1930	7th term	
70	Martin J. Kennedy	D	NY-18	April 11, 1930	7th term	
71	Robert F. Rich	R	PA-16	November 4, 1930	7th term	
72	Walter G. Andrews	R	NY-40	March 4, 1931	6th term	
73	Harry P. Beam	D	IL-04	March 4, 1931	6th term	Resigned on December 6, 1942.
74	John W. Boehne Jr.	D	IN-08	March 4, 1931	6th term	Left the House in 1943.
75	Patrick J. Boland	D	PA-11	March 4, 1931	6th term	Died on May 18, 1942.
76	Alfred L. Bulwinkle	D	NC-10	March 4, 1931; Previous service, 1921–1929.	10th term*	
77	Thomas G. Burch	D	VA-05	March 4, 1931	6th term	
78	Virgil Chapman	D	KY-07	March 4, 1931; Previous service, 1925–1929.	8th term*	
79	William Purington Cole Jr.	D	MD-02	March 4, 1931; Previous service, 1927–1929.	7th term*	Resigned on October 26, 1942.
80	Martin Dies Jr.	D	TX-02	March 4, 1931	6th term	
81	Wesley Ernest Disney	D	OK-01	March 4, 1931	6th term	
82	John W. Flannagan Jr.	D	VA-09	March 4, 1931	6th term	
83	Fred C. Gilchrist	R	IA-08	March 4, 1931	6th term	
84	Pehr G. Holmes	R	MA-04	March 4, 1931	6th term	
85	Edward A. Kelly	D	IL-03	March 4, 1931	6th term	Left the House in 1943.
86	William Larrabee	D	IN-11	March 4, 1931	6th term	Left the House in 1943.
87	Andrew J. May	D	KY-06	March 4, 1931	6th term	
88	Leonard W. Schuetz	D	IL-07	March 4, 1931	6th term	
89	Joe Shannon	D	MO-05	March 4, 1931	6th term	Left the House in 1943.
90	Brent Spence	D	KY-05	March 4, 1931	6th term	
91	Howard W. Smith	D	VA-08	March 4, 1931	6th term	
92	William H. Sutphin	D	NJ-03	March 4, 1931	6th term	Left the House in 1943.
93	R. Ewing Thomason	D	TX-16	March 4, 1931	6th term	
94	Zebulon Weaver	D	NC-11	March 4, 1931; Previous service, 1917–1919 and 1919–1929.	11th term**	
95	Clyde Williams	D	MO-08	March 4, 1931; Previous service, 1927–1929.	7th term*	Left the House in 1943.
96	Jesse P. Wolcott	R	MI-07	March 4, 1931	6th term	
97	John J. Delaney	D	NY-07	November 3, 1931; Previous service, 1918–1919.	7th term*	
98	Martin L. Sweeney	D	OH-20	November 3, 1931	6th term	Left the House in 1943.
99	Richard M. Kleberg	D	TX-14	November 24, 1931	6th term	
100	Leo E. Allen	R	IL-13	March 4, 1933	5th term	
101	Frank H. Buck	D	CA-03	March 4, 1933	5th term	Died on September 17, 1942.
102	William M. Colmer	D	MS-06	March 4, 1933	5th term	
103	John D. Dingell Sr.	D	MI-15	March 4, 1933	5th term	
104	Everett Dirksen	R	IL-16	March 4, 1933	5th term	
105	J. William Ditter	R	PA-17	March 4, 1933	5th term	
106	George Anthony Dondero	R	MI-17	March 4, 1933	5th term	
107	Richard M. Duncan	D	MO-03	March 4, 1933	5th term	Left the House in 1943.
108	Charles I. Faddis	D	PA-25	March 4, 1933	5th term	Resigned on December 4, 1942.
109	Thomas F. Ford	D	CA-14	March 4, 1933	5th term	
110	Dow W. Harter	D	OH-14	March 4, 1933	5th term	Left the House in 1943.
111	Arthur Daniel Healey	D	MA-08	March 4, 1933	5th term	Resigned on August 3, 1942.
112	Knute Hill	D	WA-04	March 4, 1933	5th term	Left the House in 1943.
113	George W. Johnson	D	WV-04	March 4, 1933; Previous service, 1923–1925.	6th term*	Left the House in 1943.
114	John Kee	D	WV-05	March 4, 1933	5th term	
115	Leo Kocialkowski	D	IL-08	March 4, 1933	5th term	Left the House in 1943.
116	Charles Kramer	D	CA-13	March 4, 1933	5th term	Left the House in 1943.
117	John Lesinski Sr.	D	MI-16	March 4, 1933	5th term	
118	Lawrence Lewis	D	CO-01	March 4, 1933	5th term	
119	Donald H. McLean	R	NJ-06	March 4, 1933	5th term	
120	James W. Mott	R	OR-01	March 4, 1933	5th term	
121	J. Hardin Peterson	D	FL-01	March 4, 1933	5th term	
122	Walter M. Pierce	D	OR-02	March 4, 1933	5th term	Left the House in 1943.
123	D. Lane Powers	R	NJ-04	March 4, 1933	5th term	
124	Jennings Randolph	D	WV-02	March 4, 1933	5th term	
125	B. Carroll Reece	R	TN-01	March 4, 1933; Previous service, 1921–1931.	10th term*	
126	James P. Richards	D	SC-05	March 4, 1933	5th term	
127	Absalom Willis Robertson	D	VA-07	March 4, 1933	5th term	
128	J. W. Robinson	D	UT-02	March 4, 1933	5th term	
129	Will Rogers	D	OK	March 4, 1933	5th term	Left the House in 1943.
130	Edwin M. Schaefer	D	IL-22	March 4, 1933	5th term	Left the House in 1943.
131	William T. Schulte	D	IN-01	March 4, 1933	5th term	Left the House in 1943.
132	James G. Scrugham	D	NV	March 4, 1933	5th term	Resigned on December 7, 1942.
133	Robert T. Secrest	D	OH-15	March 4, 1933	5th term	Resigned on August 3, 1942.
134	Martin F. Smith	D	WA-03	March 4, 1933	5th term	Left the House in 1943.
135	J. Buell Snyder	D	PA-24	March 4, 1933	5th term	
136	James Wolcott Wadsworth Jr.	R	NY-39	March 4, 1933	5th term	
137	Francis E. Walter	D	PA-21	March 4, 1933	5th term	
138	Compton I. White	D	ID-01	March 4, 1933	5th term	
139	Milton H. West	D	TX-15	April 23, 1933	5th term	
140	Paul Brown	D	GA-10	July 5, 1933	5th term	
141	Andrew Edmiston Jr.	D	WV-03	November 28, 1933	5th term	Left the House in 1943.
142	David D. Terry	D	AR-05	December 19, 1933	5th term	Left the House in 1943.
143	Charles Albert Plumley	R	VT	January 16, 1934	5th term	
144	Harold D. Cooley	D	NC-04	July 7, 1934	5th term	
145	August H. Andresen	R	MN-01	January 3, 1935; Previous service, 1925–1933.	8th term*	
146	Leslie C. Arends	R	IL-17	January 3, 1935	4th term	
147	Graham A. Barden	D	NC-03	January 3, 1935	4th term	
148	C. Jasper Bell	D	MO-04	January 3, 1935	4th term	
149	Rich T. Buckler	D	MN-09	January 3, 1935	4th term	Left the House in 1943.
150	Charles A. Buckley	D	NY-23	January 3, 1935	4th term	
151	Usher Burdick	R	ND	January 3, 1935	4th term	
152	Frank Carlson	R	KS-06	January 3, 1935	4th term	
153	Joseph E. Casey	D	MA-03	January 3, 1935	4th term	Left the House in 1943.
154	Harry B. Coffee	D	NE-05	January 3, 1935	4th term	Left the House in 1943.
155	W. Sterling Cole	R	NY-37	January 3, 1935	4th term	
156	John M. Costello	D	CA-15	January 3, 1935	4th term	
157	Fred L. Crawford	R	MI-08	January 3, 1935	4th term	
158	Albert J. Engel	D	MI-09	January 3, 1935	4th term	
159	Aaron L. Ford	D	MS-04	January 3, 1935	4th term	Left the House in 1943.
160	Bertrand W. Gearhart	R	CA-09	January 3, 1935	4th term	
161	Bernard J. Gehrmann	P	WI-10	January 3, 1935	4th term	Left the House in 1943.
162	John W. Gwynne	R	IA-03	January 3, 1935	4th term	
163	Edward J. Hart	D	NJ-14	January 3, 1935	4th term	
164	Sam Hobbs	D	AL-04	January 3, 1935	4th term	
165	Clare Hoffman	R	MI-04	January 3, 1935	4th term	
166	Frank Eugene Hook	D	MI-12	January 3, 1935	4th term	Left the House in 1943.
167	John Mills Houston	D	KS-05	January 3, 1935	4th term	Left the House in 1943.
168	Merlin Hull	R	WI-09	January 3, 1935; Previous service, 1929–1931.	5th term*	
169	Melvin Maas	R	MN-04	January 3, 1935; Previous service, 1927–1933.	7th term*	
170	George H. Mahon	D	TX-19	January 3, 1935	4th term	
171	Sam C. Massingale	D	OK-07	January 3, 1935	4th term	Died on January 17, 1941.
172	Dan R. McGehee	D	MS-07	January 3, 1935	4th term	
173	Raymond S. McKeough	D	IL-02	January 3, 1935	4th term	Left the House in 1943.
174	Charles F. McLaughlin	D	NE-02	January 3, 1935	4th term	Left the House in 1943.
175	Matthew J. Merritt	D	NY	January 3, 1935	4th term	
176	Earl C. Michener	R	MI-02	January 3, 1935; Previous service, 1919–1933.	11th term*	
177	Arthur W. Mitchell	D	IL-01	January 3, 1935	4th term	Left the House in 1943.
178	William L. Nelson	D	MO-02	January 3, 1935; Previous service, 1919–1921 and 1925–1933.	9th term**	Left the House in 1943.
179	John Conover Nichols	D	OK-02	January 3, 1935	4th term	
180	Caroline Love Goodwin O'Day	D	NY	January 3, 1935	4th term	Left the House in 1943.
181	James A. O'Leary	D	NY-11	January 3, 1935	4th term	
182	Emmet O'Neal	D	KY-03	January 3, 1935	4th term	
183	Nat Patton	D	TX-07	January 3, 1935	4th term	
184	Herron C. Pearson	D	TN-07	January 3, 1935	4th term	Left the House in 1943.
185	Hugh Peterson	D	GA-01	January 3, 1935	4th term	
186	Joseph L. Pfeifer	D	NY-03	January 3, 1935	4th term	
187	Louis C. Rabaut	D	MI-14	January 3, 1935	4th term	
188	Chauncey W. Reed	R	IL-11	January 3, 1935	4th term	
189	John M. Robsion	R	KY-09	January 3, 1935; Previous service, 1919–1930.	10th term*	
190	James A. Shanley	D	CT-03	January 3, 1935	4th term	Left the House in 1943.
191	Dewey Jackson Short	R	MO-07	January 3, 1935; Previous service, 1929–1931.	5th term*	
192	J. Joseph Smith	D	CT-05	January 3, 1935	4th term	Resigned on November 4, 1941.
193	Joe Starnes	D	AL-05	January 3, 1935	4th term	
194	Karl Stefan	R	NE-03	January 3, 1935	4th term	
195	Charles L. South	D	TX-21	January 3, 1935	4th term	Left the House in 1943.
196	John H. Tolan	D	CA-07	January 3, 1935	4th term	
197	B. Frank Whelchel	D	GA-09	January 3, 1935	4th term	
198	Orville Zimmerman	D	MO-10	January 3, 1935	4th term	
199	Charles A. Halleck	R	IN-02	January 29, 1935	4th term	
200	Frank W. Boykin	D	AL-01	July 30, 1935	4th term	
201	William Bernard Barry	D	NY-02	November 5, 1935	4th term	
202	Edward W. Creal	D	KY-04	November 5, 1935	4th term	
203	A. Leonard Allen	D	LA-08	January 3, 1937	3rd term	
204	Laurence F. Arnold	D	IL-23	January 3, 1937	3rd term	Left the House in 1943.
205	George J. Bates	R	MA-06	January 3, 1937	3rd term	
206	Lyle Boren	D	OK-04	January 3, 1937	3rd term	
207	Michael J. Bradley	D	PA-03	January 3, 1937	3rd term	
208	Overton Brooks	D	LA-04	January 3, 1937	3rd term	
209	William T. Byrne	D	NY-28	January 3, 1937	3rd term	
210	Francis Case	R	SD-02	January 3, 1937	3rd term	
211	Charles R. Clason	R	MA-02	January 3, 1937	3rd term	
212	Harold K. Claypool	D	OH-11	January 3, 1937	3rd term	Left the House in 1943.
213	E. Harold Cluett	R	NY-29	January 3, 1937	3rd term	Left the House in 1943.
214	John M. Coffee	D	WA-06	January 3, 1937	3rd term	
215	Ross A. Collins	D	MS-05	January 3, 1937; Previous service, 1921–1935.	10th term*	Left the House in 1943.
216	Fred J. Douglas	R	NY-33	January 3, 1937	3rd term	
217	Herman P. Eberharter	D	PA-32	January 3, 1937	3rd term	
218	J. Harold Flannery	D	PA-12	January 3, 1937	3rd term	Resigned on January 3, 1942.
219	Noble Jones Gregory	D	KY-01	January 3, 1937	3rd term	
220	Vincent F. Harrington	D	IA-09	January 3, 1937	3rd term	Resigned on September 5, 1942.
221	Joe Hendricks	D	FL-05	January 3, 1937	3rd term	
222	John F. Hunter	D	OH-09	January 3, 1937	3rd term	Left the House in 1943.
223	Edouard Izac	D	CA-20	January 3, 1937	3rd term	
224	William S. Jacobsen	D	IA-02	January 3, 1937	3rd term	Left the House in 1943.
225	Pete Jarman	D	AL-06	January 3, 1937	3rd term	
226	Benjamin Jarrett	R	PA-20	January 3, 1937	3rd term	Left the House in 1943.
227	Eugene James Keogh	D	NY-09	January 3, 1937	3rd term	
228	Michael J. Kirwan	D	OH-19	January 3, 1937	3rd term	
229	Charles H. Leavy	D	WA-05	January 3, 1937	3rd term	Resigned on August 1, 1942.
230	Warren Magnuson	D	WA-01	January 3, 1937	3rd term	
231	Noah M. Mason	R	IL-12	January 3, 1937	3rd term	
232	James P. McGranery	D	PA-02	January 3, 1937	3rd term	
233	Newt V. Mills	D	LA-05	January 3, 1937	3rd term	Left the House in 1943.
234	Guy L. Moser	D	PA-14	January 3, 1937	3rd term	Left the House in 1943.
235	John R. Murdock	D	AZ	January 3, 1937	3rd term	
236	James F. O'Connor	D	MT-02	January 3, 1937	3rd term	
237	James C. Oliver	R	ME-01	January 3, 1937	3rd term	Left the House in 1943.
238	Donald Lawrence O'Toole	D	NY-08	January 3, 1937	3rd term	
239	Stephen Pace	D	GA-03	January 3, 1937	3rd term	
240	Luther Patrick	D	AL-09	January 3, 1937	3rd term	Left the House in 1943.
241	William R. Poage	D	TX-11	January 3, 1937	3rd term	
242	Edward Herbert Rees	R	KS-04	January 3, 1937	3rd term	
243	Albert G. Rutherford	R	PA-15	January 3, 1937	3rd term	Died on August 10, 1941.
244	Leon Sacks	D	PA-01	January 3, 1937	3rd term	Left the House in 1943.
245	Paul W. Shafer	R	MI-03	January 3, 1937	3rd term	
246	Harry R. Sheppard	D	CA-19	January 3, 1937	3rd term	
247	John Sparkman	D	AL-08	January 3, 1937	3rd term	
248	Albert Thomas	D	TX-08	January 3, 1937	3rd term	
249	J. Parnell Thomas	R	NJ-07	January 3, 1937	3rd term	
250	Jerry Voorhis	D	CA-12	January 3, 1937	3rd term	
251	Beverly M. Vincent	D	KY-02	March 2, 1937	3rd term	
252	Lyndon B. Johnson	D	TX-10	April 10, 1937	3rd term	
253	Alfred J. Elliott	D	CA-10	May 4, 1937	3rd term	
254	Richard M. Simpson	R	PA-18	May 11, 1937	3rd term	
255	Lawrence J. Connery	D	MA-07	September 28, 1937	3rd term	Died on October 19, 1941.
256	Ralph A. Gamble	R	NY-25	November 2, 1937	3rd term	
257	Lewis K. Rockefeller	R	NY-27	November 2, 1937	3rd term	Left the House in 1943.
258	Dave E. Satterfield Jr.	D	VA-03	November 2, 1937	3rd term	
259	Thomas A. Flaherty	D	MA-11	December 14, 1937	3rd term	Left the House in 1943.
260	Joe B. Bates	D	KY-08	June 4, 1938	3rd term	
261	George M. Grant	D	AL-02	June 14, 1938	3rd term	
262	Herman Carl Andersen	R	MN-07	January 3, 1939	2nd term	
263	Jack Z. Anderson	R	CA-08	January 3, 1939	2nd term	
264	Homer D. Angell	R	OR-03	January 3, 1939	2nd term	
265	James M. Barnes	D	IL-20	January 3, 1939	2nd term	Left the House in 1943.
266	Lindley Beckworth	D	TX-03	January 3, 1939	2nd term	
267	George H. Bender	R	OH	January 3, 1939	2nd term	
268	William W. Blackney	R	MI-06	January 3, 1939; Previous service, 1935–1937.	3rd term*	
269	Stephen Bolles	R	WI-01	January 3, 1939	2nd term	Died on July 8, 1941.
270	Frederick Van Ness Bradley	R	MI-11	January 3, 1939	2nd term	
271	Clarence J. Brown	R	OH-07	January 3, 1939	2nd term	
272	Joseph R. Bryson	D	SC-04	January 3, 1939	2nd term	
273	William O. Burgin	D	NC-08	January 3, 1939	2nd term	
274	William D. Byron	D	MD-06	January 3, 1939	2nd term	Died on February 27, 1941.
275	Pat Cannon	D	FL-04	January 3, 1939	2nd term	
276	Robert B. Chiperfield	R	IL-15	January 3, 1939	2nd term	
277	Cliff Clevenger	R	OH-05	January 3, 1939	2nd term	
278	Carl Curtis	R	NE-04	January 3, 1939	2nd term	
279	Colgate Darden	D	VA-02	January 3, 1939; Previous service, 1933–1937.	4th term*	Resigned on March 1, 1941.
280	Thomas D'Alesandro Jr.	D	MD-03	January 3, 1939	2nd term	
281	Carl T. Durham	D	NC-06	January 3, 1939	2nd term	
282	Henry Dworshak	R	ID-02	January 3, 1939	2nd term	
283	Clyde T. Ellis	D	AR-03	January 3, 1939	2nd term	Left the House in 1943.
284	Charles H. Elston	R	OH-01	January 3, 1939	2nd term	
285	Ivor D. Fenton	R	PA-13	January 3, 1939	2nd term	
286	Alonzo Dillard Folger	D	NC-05	January 3, 1939	2nd term	Died on April 30, 1941.
287	Leland M. Ford	R	CA-16	January 3, 1939	2nd term	Left the House in 1943.
288	Ezekiel C. Gathings	D	AR-01	January 3, 1939	2nd term	
289	Charles L. Gerlach	R	PA-09	January 3, 1939	2nd term	
290	Lee E. Geyer	D	CA-17	January 3, 1939	2nd term	Died on October 11, 1941.
291	George W. Gillie	R	IN-04	January 3, 1939	2nd term	
292	Albert A. Gore Sr.	D	TN-04	January 3, 1939	2nd term	
293	Ed Gossett	D	TX-13	January 3, 1939	2nd term	
294	Louis E. Graham	R	PA-26	January 3, 1939	2nd term	
295	Robert A. Grant	R	IN-03	January 3, 1939	2nd term	
296	Leonard W. Hall	R	NY-01	January 3, 1939	2nd term	
297	Butler B. Hare	D	SC-03	January 3, 1939; Previous service, 1925–1933.	6th term*	
298	Forest Harness	R	IN-05	January 3, 1939	2nd term	
299	William E. Hess	R	OH-02	January 3, 1939; Previous service, 1929–1937.	6th term*	
300	John Carl Hinshaw	R	CA-11	January 3, 1939	2nd term	
301	Arthur B. Jenks	R	NH-01	January 3, 1939; Previous service, 1937–1938.	3rd term*	Left the House in 1943.
302	Ben F. Jensen	R	IA-07	January 3, 1939	2nd term	
303	Joshua L. Johns	R	WI-08	January 3, 1939	2nd term	Left the House in 1943.
304	Anton J. Johnson	R	IL-14	January 3, 1939	2nd term	
305	Noble J. Johnson	R	IN-06	January 3, 1939; Previous service, 1925–1931.	6th term*	
306	Robert Franklin Jones	R	OH-04	January 3, 1939	2nd term	
307	Robert Kean	R	NJ-12	January 3, 1939	2nd term	
308	Frank Bateman Keefe	R	WI-06	January 3, 1939	2nd term	
309	Michael J. Kennedy	D	NY-15	January 3, 1939	2nd term	Left the House in 1943.
310	Paul J. Kilday	D	TX-20	January 3, 1939	2nd term	
311	John C. Kunkel	R	PA-19	January 3, 1939	2nd term	
312	Gerald W. Landis	R	IN-07	January 3, 1939	2nd term	
313	Karl M. LeCompte	R	IA-05	January 3, 1939	2nd term	
314	A. F. Maciejewski	D	IL-06	January 3, 1939	2nd term	Resigned on December 8, 1942.
315	Vito Marcantonio	ALP	NY-20	January 3, 1939; Previous service, 1935–1937.	3rd term*	
316	Thomas E. Martin	R	IA-01	January 3, 1939	2nd term	
317	Joseph A. McArdle	D	PA-33	January 3, 1939	2nd term	Resigned on January 5, 1942.
318	John L. McMillan	D	SC-06	January 3, 1939	2nd term	
319	Wilbur Mills	D	AR-02	January 3, 1939	2nd term	
320	Mike Monroney	D	OK-05	January 3, 1939	2nd term	
321	Karl E. Mundt	R	SD-01	January 3, 1939	2nd term	
322	Reid F. Murray	R	WI-07	January 3, 1939	2nd term	
323	Francis J. Myers	D	PA-06	January 3, 1939	2nd term	
324	William F. Norrell	D	AR-06	January 3, 1939	2nd term	
325	Joseph J. O'Brien	R	NY-38	January 3, 1939	2nd term	
326	Frank C. Osmers Jr.	R	NJ-09	January 3, 1939	2nd term	Left the House in 1943.
327	William Alvin Pittenger	R	MN-08	January 3, 1939; Previous service, 1929–1933 and 1935–1937.	5th term**	
328	Robert L. Rodgers	R	PA-29	January 3, 1939	2nd term	
329	Pius L. Schwert	D	NY-42	January 3, 1939	2nd term	Died on March 11, 1941.
330	Frederick Cleveland Smith	R	OH-08	January 3, 1939	2nd term	
331	Raymond S. Springer	R	IN-10	January 3, 1939	2nd term	
332	Jessie Sumner	R	IL-18	January 3, 1939	2nd term	
333	Foster Waterman Stearns	R	NH-02	January 3, 1939	2nd term	
334	Henry O. Talle	R	IA-04	January 3, 1939	2nd term	
335	Rudolph G. Tenerowicz	D	MI-01	January 3, 1939	2nd term	Left the House in 1943.
336	Lewis D. Thill	R	WI-05	January 3, 1939	2nd term	Left the House in 1943.
337	Harve Tibbott	R	PA-27	January 3, 1939	2nd term	
338	James E. Van Zandt	R	PA-23	January 3, 1939	2nd term	
339	Albert L. Vreeland	R	NJ-11	January 3, 1939	2nd term	Left the House in 1943.
340	John Martin Vorys	R	OH-12	January 3, 1939	2nd term	
341	William H. Wheat	R	IL-19	January 3, 1939	2nd term	
342	Thomas Daniel Winter	R	KS-03	January 3, 1939	2nd term	
343	Oscar Youngdahl	R	MN-05	January 3, 1939	2nd term	Left the House in 1943.
344	Lansdale Ghiselin Sasscer	D	MD-05	February 3, 1939	2nd term	
345	W. Wirt Courtney	D	TN-06	May 11, 1939	2nd term	
346	David Jenkins Ward	D	MD-01	June 8, 1939	2nd term	
347	Albert Sidney Camp	D	GA-04	August 1, 1939	2nd term	
348	William Fadjo Cravens	D	AR-04	September 12, 1939	2nd term	
349	Estes Kefauver	D	TN-03	September 13, 1939	2nd term	
350	Edwin Arthur Hall	R	NY-34	November 7, 1939	2nd term	
351	John E. Sheridan	D	PA-04	November 7, 1939	2nd term	
352	John Jennings	R	TN-02	December 30, 1939	2nd term	
353	Morris Michael Edelstein	D	NY-14	February 6, 1940	2nd term	Died on June 4, 1941.
354	Clarence E. Kilburn	R	NY-31	February 13, 1940	2nd term	
355	Clifford Davis	D	TN-09	February 14, 1940	2nd term	
356	Bartel J. Jonkman	R	MI-05	February 19, 1940	2nd term	
357	Walter A. Lynch	D	NY-22	February 20, 1940	2nd term	
358	Frances P. Bolton	R	OH-22	February 27, 1940	2nd term	
359	J. Harry McGregor	R	OH-17	February 27, 1940	2nd term	
360	Margaret Chase Smith	R	ME-02	June 3, 1940	2nd term	
361	Herbert Covington Bonner	D	NC-01	November 5, 1940	2nd term	
362	Clinton Presba Anderson	D	NM	January 3, 1941	1st term	
363	Walter W. Bankhead	D	AL-07	January 3, 1941	1st term	Resigned on February 1, 1941.
364	Albert David Baumhart Jr.	R	OH-13	January 3, 1941	1st term	Resigned on September 2, 1942.
365	Alfred F. Beiter	D	NY-41	January 3, 1941; Previous service, 1933–1939.	4th term*	Left the House in 1943.
366	Philip Allen Bennett	R	MO-06	January 3, 1941	1st term	Died on December 7, 1942.
367	C. W. Bishop	R	IL-25	January 3, 1941	1st term	
368	Hale Boggs	D	LA-02	January 3, 1941	1st term	Left the House in 1943.
369	Gordon Canfield	R	NJ-08	January 3, 1941	1st term	
370	Louis Capozzoli	D	NY-13	January 3, 1941	1st term	
371	John Chenoweth	R	CO-03	January 3, 1941	1st term	
372	Oren S. Copeland	R	NE-01	January 3, 1941	1st term	Left the House in 1943.
373	Paul Cunningham	R	IA-06	January 3, 1941	1st term	
374	Jacob E. Davis	D	OH-06	January 3, 1941	1st term	Left the House in 1943.
375	Stephen A. Day	R	IL	January 3, 1941	1st term	
376	Charles S. Dewey	R	IL-09	January 3, 1941	1st term	
377	James R. Domengeaux	D	LA-03	January 3, 1941	1st term	
378	Le Roy D. Downs	D	CT-04	January 3, 1941	1st term	Left the House in 1943.
379	Thomas H. Eliot	D	MA-09	January 3, 1941	1st term	Left the House in 1943.
380	Frank Fellows	R	ME-03	January 3, 1941	1st term	
381	William J. Fitzgerald	D	CT-02	January 3, 1941; Previous service, 1937–1939.	2nd term*	Left the House in 1943.
382	John E. Fogarty	D	RI-02	January 3, 1941	1st term	
383	Aime Forand	D	RI-01	January 3, 1941; Previous service, 1937–1939.	2nd term*	
384	Richard Pillsbury Gale	R	MN-03	January 3, 1941	1st term	
385	John S. Gibson	D	GA-08	January 3, 1941	1st term	
386	Walter K. Granger	D	UT-01	January 3, 1941	1st term	
387	Harry L. Haines	D	PA-22	January 3, 1941; Previous service, 1931–1939.	5th term*	Left the House in 1943.
388	Oren Harris	D	AR-07	January 3, 1941	1st term	
389	Felix Edward Hébert	D	LA-01	January 3, 1941	1st term	
390	James J. Heffernan	D	NY-05	January 3, 1941	1st term	
391	James V. Heidinger	R	IL-24	January 3, 1941	1st term	
392	William S. Hill	R	CO-02	January 3, 1941	1st term	
393	Greg J. Holbrock	D	OH-03	January 3, 1941	1st term	Left the House in 1943.
394	George Evan Howell	R	IL-21	January 3, 1941	1st term	
395	Lawrence E. Imhoff	D	OH-18	January 3, 1941; Previous service, 1933–1939.	4th term*	Left the House in 1943.
396	Henry M. Jackson	D	WA-02	January 3, 1941	1st term	
397	William Ward Johnson	R	CA-18	January 3, 1941	1st term	
398	Augustine B. Kelley	D	PA-28	January 3, 1941	1st term	
399	Herman P. Kopplemann	D	CT-01	January 3, 1941; Previous service, 1933–1939.	4th term*	Left the House in 1943.
400	Lucien J. Maciora	D	CT	January 3, 1941	1st term	Left the House in 1943.
401	John J. McIntyre	D	WY	January 3, 1941	1st term	Left the House in 1943.
402	John Ambrose Meyer	D	MD-04	January 3, 1941	1st term	Left the House in 1943.
403	George D. O'Brien	D	MI-13	January 3, 1941; Previous service, 1937–1939.	2nd term*	
404	Joseph O'Hara	R	MN-02	January 3, 1941	1st term	
405	George A. Paddock	R	IL-10	January 3, 1941	1st term	Left the House in 1943.
406	William T. Pheiffer	R	NY-16	January 3, 1941	1st term	Left the House in 1943.
407	Vance Plauché	D	LA-07	January 3, 1941	1st term	Left the House in 1943.
408	Walter C. Ploeser	R	MO-12	January 3, 1941	1st term	
409	Percy Priest	D	TN-05	January 3, 1941	1st term	
410	Robert L. Ramsay	D	WV-01	January 3, 1941; Previous service, 1933–1939.	4th term*	Left the House in 1943.
411	Jeannette Rankin	R	MT-01	January 3, 1941; Previous service, 1917–1919.	2nd term*	Left the House in 1943.
412	L. Mendel Rivers	D	SC-01	January 3, 1941	1st term	
413	Ross Rizley	R	OK-08	January 3, 1941	1st term	
414	Charles R. Robertson	R	ND	January 3, 1941	1st term	Left the House in 1943.
415	Thomas Rolph	R	CA-04	January 3, 1941	1st term	
416	Sam M. Russell	D	TX-17	January 3, 1941	1st term	
417	Jared Y. Sanders Jr.	D	LA-06	January 3, 1941; Previous service, 1934–1937.	3rd term*	Left the House in 1943.
418	Harry Sauthoff	P	WI-02	January 3, 1941; Previous service, 1935–1939.	3rd term*	
419	Thomas E. Scanlon	D	PA-30	January 3, 1941	1st term	
420	Hugh Scott	R	PA-07	January 3, 1941	1st term	
421	Robert L. F. Sikes	D	FL-03	January 3, 1941	1st term	
422	Kenneth F. Simpson	R	NY-17	January 3, 1941	1st term	Died on January 25, 1941.
423	Francis R. Smith	D	PA-05	January 3, 1941	1st term	Left the House in 1943.
424	William H. Stevenson	R	WI-03	January 3, 1941	1st term	
425	William Stratton	R	IL	January 3, 1941	1st term	Left the House in 1943.
426	John B. Sullivan	D	MO-11	January 3, 1941	1st term	Left the House in 1943.
427	William R. Thom	D	OH-16	January 3, 1941; Previous service, 1933–1939.	4th term*	Left the House in 1943.
428	Philip A. Traynor	D	DE	January 3, 1941	1st term	Left the House in 1943.
429	Thaddeus Wasielewski	D	WI-04	January 3, 1941	1st term	
430	Samuel A. Weiss	D	PA-31	January 3, 1941	1st term	
431	Elmer H. Wene	D	NJ-02	January 3, 1941; Previous service, 1937–1939.	2nd term*	
432	Earl Wilson	R	IN-09	January 3, 1941	1st term	
433	Eugene Worley	D	TX-18	January 3, 1941	1st term	
434	James A. Wright	D	PA-34	January 3, 1941	1st term	
435	Stephen M. Young	D	OH	January 3, 1941; Previous service, 1933–1937.	3rd term*	Left the House in 1943.
	Joseph C. Baldwin	R	NY-17	March 11, 1941	1st term	
	Victor Wickersham	D	OK-07	April 1, 1941	1st term	
	Winder R. Harris	D	VA-02	April 8, 1941	1st term	
	John Cornelius Butler	R	NY-42	April 22, 1941	1st term	
	Katharine Byron	D	MD-06	May 27, 1941	1st term	Left the House in 1943.
	John Hamlin Folger	D	NC-05	June 14, 1941	1st term	
	Carter Manasco	D	AL-07	June 24, 1941	1st term	
	Arthur G. Klein	D	NY-14	July 29, 1941	1st term	
	Lawrence H. Smith	R	WI-01	August 29, 1941	1st term	
	Wilson D. Gillette	R	PA-15	November 4, 1941	1st term	
	Jamie Whitten	D	MS-02	November 4, 1941	1st term	
	Robert F. Rockwell	R	CO-04	December 9, 1941	1st term	
	Thomas J. Lane	D	MA-07	December 30, 1941	1st term	
	Joseph E. Talbot	R	CT-05	January 20, 1942	1st term	
	Elmer J. Holland	D	PA-33	May 19, 1942	1st term	Left the House in 1943.
	Thomas B. Miller	R	PA-12	May 19, 1942	1st term	
	Cecil R. King	D	CA-17	August 25, 1942	1st term	
	Veronica Grace Boland	D	PA-11	November 3, 1942	1st term	Left the House in 1943.
	Harry E. Narey	R	IA-09	November 3, 1942	1st term	Left the House in 1943.

== Delegates ==
Rank	Delegate	Party	District	Seniority date (Previous service, if any)	No.# of term(s)	Notes
1	Anthony Dimond	D	AK	March 4, 1933	5th term	
2	Samuel Wilder King	R	HI	January 3, 1935	4th term	
3	Joaquin Miguel Elizalde	Lib	PHL	September 29, 1938	3rd term	
4	Bolívar Pagán	Socialist	PR	December 26, 1939	2nd term	

== See also ==
- 77th United States Congress
- List of United States congressional districts
- List of United States senators in the 77th Congress
