= Eberharter =

Eberharter is a surname, originating from Tyrol, Austria. Notable people with the surname include:

- Herman P. Eberharter (1892–1958), Democratic member of the U.S. House of Representatives from Pennsylvania
- Stephan Eberharter (born 1969), Austrian alpine ski racer
