= Michael Joseph Muldowney =

American politician

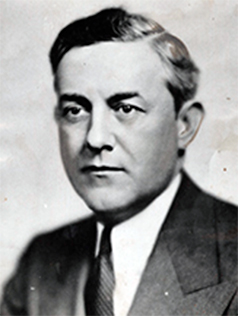

Member of the U.S. House of Representatives from Pennsylvania's 32nd district
- In office March 4, 1933 – January 3, 1935
- Preceded by: Edmund F. Erk
- Succeeded by: Theodore L. Moritz

Personal details
- Born: August 10, 1889 Philadelphia, Pennsylvania, U.S.
- Died: March 30, 1947 (aged 57) Pittsburgh, Pennsylvania, U.S.
- Party: Republican

Michael Joseph Muldowney (August 10, 1889 – March 30, 1947) was a Republican member of the U.S. House of Representatives from Pennsylvania.

He was born in Philadelphia, Pennsylvania. In 1894, he moved with his parents to Pittsburgh, Pennsylvania. He was graduated from Duquesne University in Pittsburgh in 1908. He was a member of the Pennsylvania State House of Representatives from 1925 to 1929. He served in the city council of Pittsburgh from 1930 to 1933.

Muldowney was elected as a Republican to the Seventy-third Congress, but was an unsuccessful candidate for reelection in 1934. He was a member of the State board of mercantile appraisers from 1935 to 1937. He was appointed as the State Unemployment Compensation Referee in 1940 and served in that capacity until his death in Pittsburgh. Muldowney was interred at Calvary Cemetery, Pittsburgh, Pennsylvania.

== Sources ==
- United States Congress. "Michael J. Muldowney (id: M001067)". Biographical Directory of the United States Congress.
- The Political Graveyard

U.S. House of Representatives
| Preceded by Edmund F. Erk | Member of the U.S. House of Representatives from Pennsylvania's 32nd congressional district 1933–1935 | Succeeded by Theodore L. Moritz |
