= James W. Brown =

American politician, Pennsylvania (1844–1909)

James W. Brown II
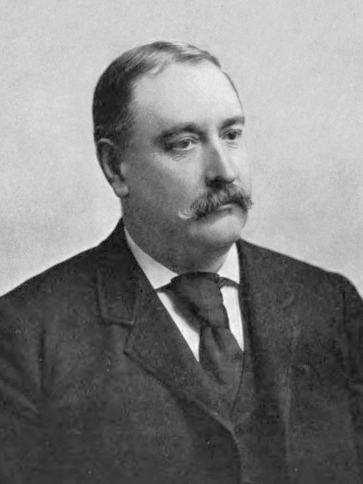

Member of the U.S. House of Representatives from Pennsylvania's 32nd district
- In office March 4, 1903 – March 3, 1905
- Preceded by: District created
- Succeeded by: Andrew J. Barchfeld

Personal details
- Born: July 14, 1844 Pittsburgh, Pennsylvania, U.S.
- Died: October 23, 1909 (aged 65) Pointe Mouillee, Michigan, U.S.
- Party: Republican

James W. Brown II (July 14, 1844 – October 23, 1909) was a Republican member of the U.S. House of Representatives from Pennsylvania. He was born in Pittsburgh, Pennsylvania. He worked in the iron and steel industry and served as vice president of the Crucible Steel Company. He was also engaged in banking, and was trustee of the Dollar Savings Bank.

James W. Brown II was a member of the South Fork Fishing and Hunting Club, whose earthen dam failed in May 1889, causing the Johnstown Flood. At the time of the Johnstown Flood, Brown was the secretary and treasurer of the Hussey, Howe and Company Steel Works Ltd. Soon after the disaster, Brown and several others of the Pittsburgh upper class bought summer vacation properties on Lake Muskoka, in Ontario, Canada, centered near the town of Beaumaris.

Brown was married to Clara Palmer Howe, the eighth child of U.S. Representative Thomas Marshall Howe and Mary Ann Palmer. James W. Brown II was the great-great-grandson of Fur Trader and Indian Agent/Interpreter Thomas McKee, who served under General Forbes at Fort Pitt circa 1758. He was a descendant of James McKee, whose mother, Margaret Tecumsepah Opessa was an older sister to Metheotashe Mary Opessa, the mother of Tecumseh, the great Shawnee leader and Tenskwatawa, the Shawnee Prophet. James W. Brown II was also brother-in-law to Pittsburgh Mayor and American ambassador to Japan, George W. Guthrie.

Brown was elected as an Independent Republican to the Fifty-eighth Congress. He declined to be a candidate for renomination in 1904. He resumed his former business pursuits and served as president of the Colonial Steel Company. Brown was a freemason and served as grand master of the Grand Lodge of Pennsylvania from 1904 to 1905. He died at Pointe Mouillee, Michigan. Interment in Allegheny Cemetery in Pittsburgh.

== Sources ==
- United States Congress. "James W. Brown II (id: B000923)". Biographical Directory of the United States Congress.
- The Political Graveyard

U.S. House of Representatives
Preceded by District created	Member of the U.S. House of Representatives from Pennsylvania's 32nd congressional district 1903–1905	Succeeded by Andrew J. Barchfeld
