= List of United States senators in the 74th Congress =

This is a complete list of United States senators during the 74th United States Congress listed by seniority from January 3, 1935, to January 3, 1937.

Order of service is based on the commencement of the senator's first term. Behind this is former service as a senator (only giving the senator seniority within their new incoming class), service as vice president, a House member, a cabinet secretary, or a governor of a state. The final factor is the population of the senator's state.

Senators who were sworn in during the middle of the Congress (up until the last senator who was not sworn in early after winning the November 1936 election) are listed at the end of the list with no number.

In this Congress, Park Trammel was the most senior junior senator until his death on May 8, 1936, after which it was Gerald Nye. Four senators held the distinction of most junior senior senator during this Congress: Homer Bone from January 3 to May 6, 1935; Carl Hatch from May 6, 1935 to June 17, 1936; Scott Loftin from June 17 to November 4, 1936; and Charles Andrews from November 4, 1936 to the end of this Congress.

== Terms of service ==
Class	Terms of service of senators that expired in years
Class 2	Terms of service of senators that expired in 1937 (AL, AR, CO, DE, GA, IA, ID, IL, KS, KY, LA, MA, ME, MI, MN, MS, MT, NC, NE, NH, NJ, NM, OK, OR, RI, SC, SD, TN, TX, VA, WV, and WY.)
Class 3	Terms of service of senators that expired in 1939 (AL, AR, AZ, CA, CO, CT, FL, GA, ID, IL, IN, IA, KS, KY, LA, MD, MO, NC, ND, NH, NV, NY, OH, OK, OR, PA, SC, SD, UT, VT, WA, and WI.)
Class 2	Terms of service of senators that expired in 1941 (AZ, CA, CT, DE, FL, IN, MA, MD, ME, MI, MN, MO, MS, MT, ND, NE, NJ, NM, NV, NY, OH, PA, RI, TN, TX, UT, VA, VT, WA, WI, WV, and WY.)

== U.S. Senate seniority list ==
U.S. Senate seniority
Rank	Senator (party-state)	Seniority date	Other factors
1	William Borah (R-ID)	March 4, 1907	
2	Ellison D. Smith (D-SC)	March 4, 1909	South Carolina 24th in population (1900)
3	Duncan U. Fletcher (D-FL)	March 4, 1909	Florida 33rd in population (1900)
4	Henry F. Ashurst (D-AZ)	April 2, 1912	
5	Key Pittman (D-NV)	January 29, 1913	
6	Morris Sheppard (D-TX)	February 3, 1913	
7	Joseph Robinson (D-AR)	March 4, 1913	Former representative (10 years), Former governor
8	George W. Norris (R-NE)	March 4, 1913	Former representative (10 years)
9	Kenneth McKellar (D-TN)	March 4, 1917	Former representative (6 years)
10	William H. King (D-UT)	March 4, 1917	Former representative (3 years)
11	Park Trammell (D-FL)	March 4, 1917	Former governor
12	Frederick Hale (R-ME)	March 4, 1917	
13	Hiram Johnson (R-CA)	March 16, 1917	
14	Charles L. McNary (R-OR)	December 18, 1918	
15	Arthur Capper (R-KS)	March 4, 1919	Former governor (4 years)
16	Henry W. Keyes (R-NH)	March 4, 1919	Former governor (2 years)
17	Pat Harrison (D-MS)	March 5, 1919	
18	Carter Glass (D-VA)	February 2, 1920	
19	Peter Norbeck (R-SD)	March 4, 1921	
20	Walter F. George (D-GA)	November 22, 1922	
21	James Couzens (R-MI)	November 29, 1922	
22	Lynn Frazier (R-ND)	March 4, 1923	Former governor
23	Royal S. Copeland (D-NY)	March 4, 1923	New York 1st in population (1920)
24	Henrik Shipstead (FL-MN)	March 4, 1923	Minnesota 17th in population (1920)
25	Burton K. Wheeler (D-MT)	March 4, 1923	Montana 39th in population (1920)
26	Jesse H. Metcalf (R-RI)	November 4, 1924	
27	Thomas D. Schall (R-MN)	March 4, 1925	
28	Robert M. La Follette, Jr. (WP-WI)	September 30, 1925	
29	Gerald Nye (R-ND)	November 14, 1925	
30	David I. Walsh (D-MA)	December 6, 1926	
31	Carl Hayden (D-AZ)	March 4, 1927	Former representative (15 years)
32	Alben W. Barkley (D-KY)	March 4, 1927	Former representative (14 years)
33	Elmer Thomas (D-OK)	March 4, 1927	Former representative (4 years), Oklahoma 21st in population (1920)
34	Millard Tydings (D-MD)	March 4, 1927	Former representative (4 years), Maryland 28th in population (1920)
35	Robert F. Wagner (D-NY)	March 4, 1927	New York 1st in population (1920)
36	Hugo Black (D-AL)	March 4, 1927	Alabama 18th in population (1920)
37	Frederick Steiwer (R-OR)	March 4, 1927	Oregon 34th in population (1920)
38	Arthur H. Vandenberg (R-MI)	March 31, 1928	
39	Daniel Hastings (R-DE)	December 10, 1928	
40	Bronson Cutting (R-NM)	March 4, 1929	Previously a senator
41	Tom Connally (D-TX)	March 4, 1929	Former representative
42	John G. Townsend, Jr. (R-DE)	March 4, 1929	Former governor
43	Robert J. Bulkley (D-OH)	December 1, 1930	Former representative
44	Robert D. Carey (R-WY)	December 1, 1930	Former governor
45	George McGill (D-KS)	December 1, 1930	
46	James J. Davis (R-PA)	December 2, 1930	
47	Thomas Gore (D-OK)	March 4, 1931	Previously a senator (14 years)
48	Matthew M. Neely (D-WV)	March 4, 1931	Previously a senator (6 years), former representative (8 years)
49	J. Hamilton Lewis (D-IL)	March 4, 1931	Previously a senator (6 years), former representative (2 years)
50	James F. Byrnes (D-SC)	March 4, 1931	Former representative (14 years), South Carolina 26th in population (1930)
51	Wallace H. White, Jr. (R-ME)	March 4, 1931	Former representative (14 years), Maine 35th in population (1930)
52	L. J. Dickinson (R-IA)	March 4, 1931	Former representative (12 years)
53	William J. Bulow (D-SD)	March 4, 1931	Former governor
54	Marcus A. Coolidge (D-MA)	March 4, 1931	Massachusetts 8th in population (1930)
55	Josiah W. Bailey (D-NC)	March 4, 1931	North Carolina 12th in population (1930)
56	John H. Bankhead II (D-AL)	March 4, 1931	Alabama 15th in population (1930)
57	Marvel M. Logan (D-KY)	March 4, 1931	Kentucky 17th in population (1930)
58	Edward Costigan (D-CO)	March 4, 1931	Colorado 33rd in population (1930)
59	Warren Austin (R-VT)	April 1, 1931	
60	Hattie Caraway (D-AR)	November 13, 1931	
61	William Warren Barbour (R-NJ)	December 1, 1931	
62	Huey Long (D-LA)	January 25, 1932	
63	Robert R. Reynolds (D-NC)	December 5, 1932	
64	Richard Russell, Jr. (D-GA)	January 12, 1933	
65	Bennett Champ Clark (D-MO)	February 4, 1933	
66	Alva B. Adams (D-CO)	March 4, 1933	Previously a senator
67	Augustine Lonergan (D-CT)	March 4, 1933	Former representative (8 years)
68	William H. Dieterich (D-IL)	March 4, 1933	Former representative (2 years), Illinois 3rd in population (1930)
69	John H. Overton (D-LA)	March 4, 1933	Former representative (2 years), Louisiana 22nd in population (1930)
70	Harry F. Byrd, Sr. (D-VA)	March 4, 1933	Former governor (4 years)
71	Fred H. Brown (D-NH)	March 4, 1933	Former governor (2 years)
72	William Gibbs McAdoo (D-CA)	March 4, 1933	California 6th in population (1930)
73	Frederick Van Nuys (D-IN)	March 4, 1933	Indiana 11th in population (1930)
74	F. Ryan Duffy (D-WI)	March 4, 1933	Wisconsin 13th in population (1930)
75	Nathan L. Bachman (D-TN)	March 4, 1933	Tennessee 16th in population (1930)
76	Louis Murphy (D-IA)	March 4, 1933	Iowa 19th in population (1930)
77	Homer T. Bone (D-WA)	March 4, 1933	Washington 30th in population (1930)
78	Elbert D. Thomas (D-UT)	March 4, 1933	Utah 40th in population (1930)
79	James Pope (D-ID)	March 4, 1933	Idaho 42nd in population (1930)
80	Pat McCarran (D-NV)	March 4, 1933	Nevada 48th in population (1930)
81	Carl Hatch (D-NM)	October 10, 1933	
82	Ernest W. Gibson (R-VT)	November 21, 1933	
83	Joseph C. O'Mahoney (D-WY)	January 1, 1934	
84	James Murray (D-MT)	November 7, 1934	
85	Peter G. Gerry (D-RI)	January 3, 1935	Previously a senator
86	Francis T. Maloney (D-CT)	January 3, 1935	Former representative (2 years), Connecticut 29th in population (1930)
87	Edward R. Burke (D-NE)	January 3, 1935	Former representative (2 years), Nebraska 32nd in population (1930)
88	Theodore G. Bilbo (D-MS)	January 3, 1935	Former governor (8 years)
89	Vic Donahey (D-OH)	January 3, 1935	Former governor (6 years), Ohio 4th in population (1930)
90	A. Harry Moore (D-NJ)	January 3, 1935	Former governor (6 years), New Jersey 9th in population (1930)
91	Joseph F. Guffey (D-PA)	January 3, 1935	Pennsylvania 2nd in population (1930)
92	Harry S. Truman (D-MO)	January 3, 1935	Missouri 10th in population (1930)
93	Sherman Minton (D-IN)	January 3, 1935	Indiana 11th in population (1930)
94	George L. P. Radcliffe (D-MD)	January 3, 1935	Maryland 28th in population (1930)
95	Lewis B. Schwellenbach (D-WA)	January 3, 1935	Washington 30th in population (1930)
	Dennis Chavez (D-NM)	May 11, 1935	
96	Rush D. Holt (D-WV)	June 21, 1935	
	Elmer Benson (FL-MN)	December 27, 1935	
	Rose McConnell Long (D-LA)	January 31, 1936	
	Scott Loftin (D-FL)	May 26, 1936	
	William L. Hill (D-FL)	July 1, 1936	
	Guy Mark Gillette (D-IA)	November 4, 1936	Former representative
	Guy Howard (R-MN)	November 4, 1936	Minnesota 18th in population (1930)
	Charles O. Andrews (D-FL)	November 4, 1936	Florida 31st in population (1930); "A" 1st in alphabet
	Claude Pepper (D-FL)	November 4, 1936	Florida 31st in population (1930); "P" 16th in alphabet
	Prentiss M. Brown (D-MI)	November 19, 1936	
	Herbert E. Hitchcock (D-SD)	December 29, 1936	

The most senior senators by class were Henry F. Ashurst (R-Arizona) from Class 1, William Borah (R-Idaho) from Class 2, and Ellison D. Smith (D-South Carolina) from Class 3.

== See also ==
- 74th United States Congress
- List of United States representatives in the 74th Congress
