= Andrew J. Barchfeld =

American politician from Pennsylvania

Andrew Jackson Barchfeld
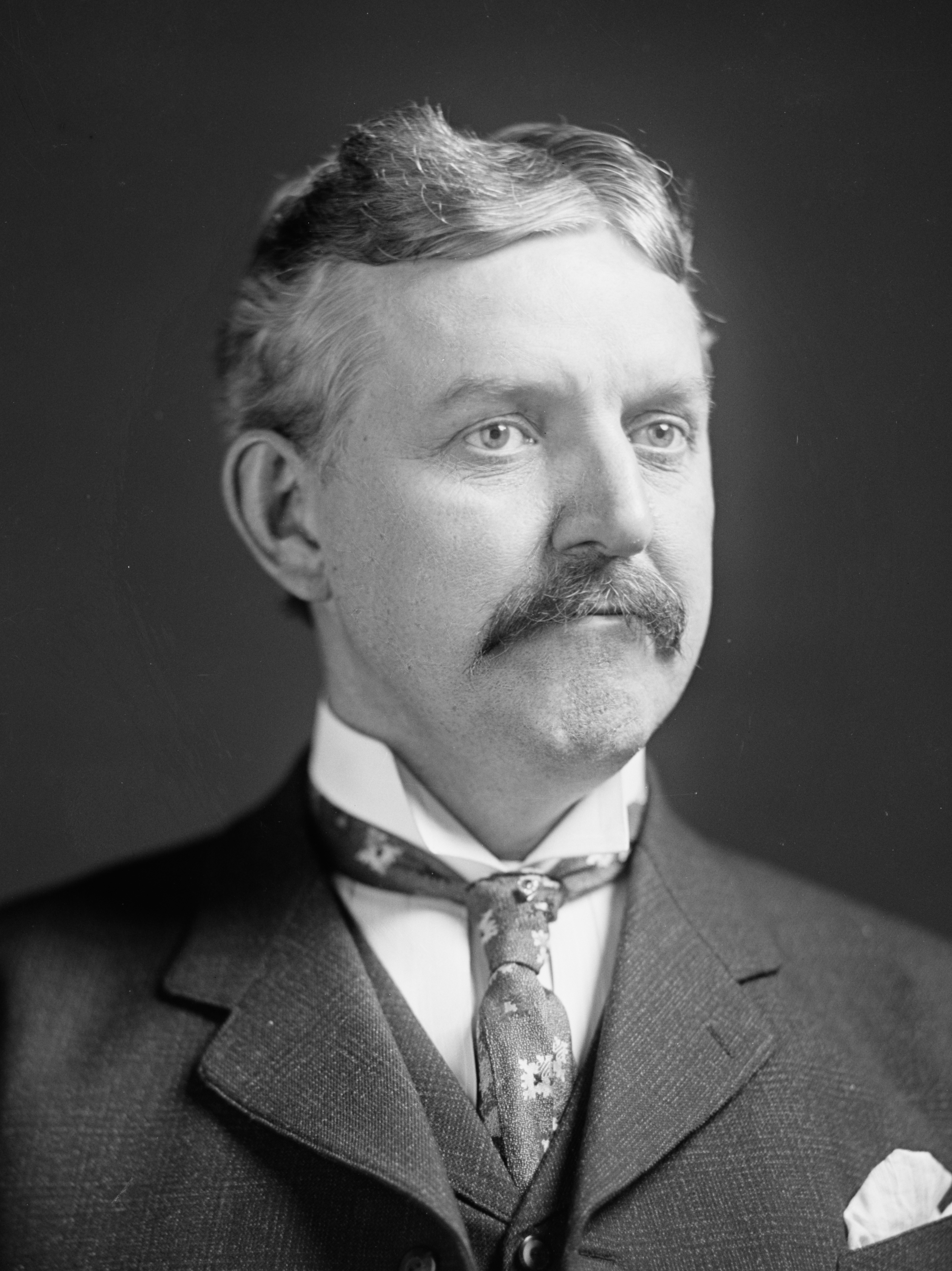

Member of the U.S. House of Representatives from Pennsylvania's 32nd district
- In office March 4, 1905 – March 3, 1917
- Preceded by: James W. Brown
- Succeeded by: Guy E. Campbell

Personal details
- Born: May 18, 1863 Pittsburgh, Pennsylvania, U.S.
- Died: January 28, 1922 (aged 58) Washington, D.C., U.S.
- Party: Republican

Andrew Jackson Barchfeld (May 18, 1863 – January 28, 1922) was a Republican member of the United States House of Representatives from Pennsylvania.

Barchfeld was born in Pittsburgh, Pennsylvania, to German immigrants from Prussia. He attended Pittsburgh Central High School and graduated from Jefferson Medical College in Philadelphia, Pennsylvania, in 1884. He was a physician, hospital executive, and member of the common council of Pittsburgh from 1886 to 1887. He was a member of the Republican State committee. He was an unsuccessful candidate for election to Congress in 1902.

Barchfeld was elected as a Republican to the Fifty-ninth and to the five succeeding Congresses, losing reelection in 1916. He was one of 14 representatives, all Republicans, to oppose the Sixteenth Amendment to the United States Constitution, which imposed a federal income tax.

Barchfeld was a delegate to the peace congress at Brussels in 1905. He was a member of the commission to the Philippine Islands in 1910, and a member of the Panama Canal Commission in 1912.

Barchfeld died on January 28, 1922, in the collapse of the Knickerbocker Theater in Washington, D.C. He is buried in South Side Cemetery in Pittsburgh.

== Sources ==
- United States Congress. "Andrew J. Barchfield (id: B000133)". Biographical Directory of the United States Congress.
- The Political Graveyard

U.S. House of Representatives
Preceded by James W. Brown	Member of the U.S. House of Representatives from Pennsylvania's 32nd congressional district 1905–1917	Succeeded by Guy E. Campbell
