= Edmund F. Erk =

American politician

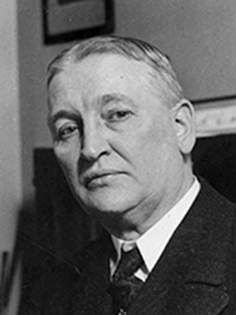

Member of the U.S. House of Representatives from Pennsylvania's 32nd district
- In office November 4, 1930 – March 3, 1933
- Preceded by: Stephen G. Porter
- Succeeded by: Michael Joseph Muldowney

Personal details
- Born: April 17, 1872 Allegheny, Pennsylvania, U.S.
- Died: December 14, 1953 (aged 81) Bethesda, Maryland, U.S.
- Party: Republican

Edmund Frederick Erk (April 17, 1872 – December 14, 1953) was a Republican member of the U.S. House of Representatives from Pennsylvania.

== Biography ==
Erk was born in Allegheny City, Pennsylvania (now the North Side of Pittsburgh) to German immigrants. He was engaged extensively in newspaper work in Pittsburgh, Pennsylvania. He served as secretary to Congressman Stephen G. Porter from 1911 to 1919 and as clerk of the United States House Committee on Foreign Affairs from June 1, 1919, to November 3, 1930. He was the Secretary of the American delegation to the League of Nations Conference at Geneva in 1924 and 1925.

Erk was elected as a Republican to the Seventy-first Congress to fill the vacancy caused by the death of Stephen G. Porter, at the same time being elected to the Seventy-second Congress. He was an unsuccessful candidate for reelection in 1932 and for election in 1934. He served as secretary to Congressman Michael J. Muldowney from March 4, 1933, to January 2, 1935, and as an author and compiler. He served as clerk to United States Senator James J. Davis of Pennsylvania from 1939 to 1945. He was a resident in Bethesda, Maryland, until his death there. Interment in St. John's Cemetery in Pittsburgh.

== Sources ==
- United States Congress. "Edmund F. Erk (id: E000203)". Biographical Directory of the United States Congress.
- The Political Graveyard

U.S. House of Representatives
Preceded by Stephen G. Porter	Member of the U.S. House of Representatives from Pennsylvania's 32nd congressional district 1930–1933	Succeeded by Michael J. Muldowney
