= List of United States senators in the 77th Congress =

This is a complete list of United States senators during the 77th United States Congress listed by seniority from January 3, 1941, to January 3, 1943.

Order of service is based on the commencement of the senator's first term. Behind this is former service as a senator (only giving the senator seniority within their new incoming class), service as vice president, a House member, a cabinet secretary, or a governor of a state. The final factor is the population of the senator's state.

Senators who were sworn in during the middle of the Congress (up until the last senator who was not sworn in early after winning the November 1942 election) are listed at the end of the list with no number.

In this Congress, Tom Connally was the most senior junior senator. The most junior senior senator was Robert Taft until January 12, 1941, after which Harley Kilgore became the most junior senior senator.

== Terms of service ==
Class	Terms of service of senators that expired in years
Class 2	Terms of service of senators that expired in 1943 (AL, AR, CO, DE, GA, IA, ID, IL, KS, KY, LA, MA, ME, MI, MN, MS, MT, NC, NE, NH, NJ, NM, OK, OR, RI, SC, SD, TN, TX, VA, WV, and WY.)
Class 3	Terms of service of senators that expired in 1945 (AL, AR, AZ, CA, CO, CT, FL, GA, ID, IL, IN, IA, KS, KY, LA, MD, MO, NC, ND, NH, NV, NY, OH, OK, OR, PA, SC, SD, UT, VT, WA, and WI.)
Class 1	Terms of service of senators that expired in 1947 (AZ, CA, CT, DE, FL, IN, MA, MD, ME, MI, MN, MO, MS, MT, ND, NE, NJ, NM, NV, NY, OH, PA, RI, TN, TX, UT, VA, VT, WA, WI, WV, and WY.)

== U.S. Senate seniority list ==
U.S. Senate seniority
Rank	Senator (party-state)	Seniority date	Other factors
1	Ellison D. Smith (D-SC)	March 4, 1909	
2	Morris Sheppard (D-TX)	February 3, 1913	
3	George W. Norris (I-NE)	March 4, 1913	
4	Kenneth McKellar (D-TN)	March 4, 1917	
5	Hiram Johnson (R-CA)	March 16, 1917	
6	Charles L. McNary (R-OR)	December 18, 1918	
7	Arthur Capper (R-KS)	March 4, 1919	
8	Pat Harrison (D-MS)	March 5, 1919	
9	Carter Glass (D-VA)	February 2, 1920	
10	Walter F. George (D-GA)	November 22, 1922	
11	Henrik Shipstead (R-MN)	March 4, 1923	Minnesota 17th in population (1920)
12	Burton K. Wheeler (D-MT)	March 4, 1923	Montana 39th in population (1920)
13	Robert M. La Follette Jr. (WP-WI)	September 30, 1925	
14	Gerald Nye (R-ND)	November 14, 1925	
15	David I. Walsh (D-MA)	December 6, 1926	
16	Carl Hayden (D-AZ)	March 4, 1927	Former representative (15 years)
17	Alben W. Barkley (D-KY)	March 4, 1927	Former representative (14 years)
18	Elmer Thomas (D-OK)	March 4, 1927	Former representative (4 years), Oklahoma 21st in population (1920)
19	Millard Tydings (D-MD)	March 4, 1927	Former representative (4 years), Maryland 28th in population (1920)
20	Robert F. Wagner (D-NY)	March 4, 1927	
21	Arthur H. Vandenberg (R-MI)	March 31, 1928	
22	Tom Connally (D-TX)	March 4, 1929	
23	James J. Davis (R-PA)	December 2, 1930	
24	Matthew M. Neely (D-WV)	March 4, 1931	Previously a senator
25	James F. Byrnes (D-SC)	March 4, 1931	Former representative (14 years)
26	Wallace H. White Jr. (R-ME)	March 4, 1931	Former representative (7 years)
27	William J. Bulow (D-SD)	March 4, 1931	Former governor
28	Josiah W. Bailey (D-NC)	March 4, 1931	North Carolina 12th in population (1930)
29	John H. Bankhead II (D-AL)	March 4, 1931	Alabama 15th in population (1930)
30	Warren Austin (R-VT)	April 1, 1931	
31	Hattie Caraway (D-AR)	November 13, 1931	
32	Robert R. Reynolds (D-NC)	December 5, 1932	
33	Richard Russell Jr. (D-GA)	January 12, 1933	
34	Bennett Champ Clark (D-MO)	February 4, 1933	
35	Alva B. Adams (D-CO)	March 4, 1933	Previously a senator
36	John H. Overton (D-LA)	March 4, 1933	Former representative
37	Harry F. Byrd Sr. (D-VA)	March 4, 1933	Former governor
38	Frederick Van Nuys (D-IN)	March 4, 1933	Indiana 11th in population (1930)
39	Homer T. Bone (D-WA)	March 4, 1933	Washington 30th in population (1930)
40	Elbert D. Thomas (D-UT)	March 4, 1933	Utah 40th in population (1930)
41	Pat McCarran (D-NV)	March 4, 1933	Nevada 48th in population (1930)
42	Carl Hatch (D-NM)	October 10, 1933	
43	Joseph C. O'Mahoney (D-WY)	January 1, 1934	
44	James Murray (D-MT)	November 7, 1934	
45	Peter G. Gerry (D-RI)	January 3, 1935	Previously a senator
46	Francis T. Maloney (D-CT)	January 3, 1935	Former representative
47	Theodore G. Bilbo (D-MS)	January 3, 1935	Former governor
48	Joseph F. Guffey (D-PA)	January 3, 1935	Pennsylvania 2nd in population (1930)
49	Harry S. Truman (D-MO)	January 3, 1935	Missouri 10th in population (1930)
50	George L. P. Radcliffe (D-MD)	January 3, 1935	Maryland 28th in population (1930)
51	Dennis Chavez (D-NM)	May 11, 1935	
52	Guy Mark Gillette (D-IA)	November 4, 1936	Former representative
53	Charles O. Andrews (D-FL)	November 4, 1936	"A" 1st in alphabet
54	Claude Pepper (D-FL)	November 4, 1936	"P" 16th in alphabet
55	Prentiss M. Brown (D-MI)	November 19, 1936	
56	Joshua B. Lee (D-OK)	January 3, 1937	Former representative
57	Clyde L. Herring (D-IA)	January 3, 1937	Former governor, Iowa 19th in population (1930)
58	Edwin C. Johnson (D-CO)	January 3, 1937	Former governor, Colorado 33rd in population (1930)
59	Theodore F. Green (D-RI)	January 3, 1937	Former governor, Rhode Island 37th in population (1930)
60	Styles Bridges (R-NH)	January 3, 1937	Former governor, New Hampshire 41st in population (1930)
61	Henry Cabot Lodge Jr. (R-MA)	January 3, 1937	Massachusetts 8th in population (1930)
62	Allen J. Ellender (D-LA)	January 3, 1937	Louisiana 22nd in population (1930)
63	James H. Hughes (D-DE)	January 3, 1937	Delaware 46th in population (1930)
64	Henry H. Schwartz (D-WY)	January 3, 1937	Wyoming 47th in population (1930)
65	William H. Smathers (D-NJ)	April 15, 1937	
66	John E. Miller (D-AR)	November 15, 1937	
67	Joseph L. Hill (D-AL)	January 11, 1938	
68	William Warren Barbour (R-NJ)	November 9, 1938	Previously a senator
69	Tom Stewart (D-TN)	November 9, 1938	
70	James M. Mead (D-NY)	December 3, 1938	
71	Charles W. Tobey (R-NH)	January 3, 1939	Former representative (6 years)
72	Scott W. Lucas (D-IL)	January 3, 1939	Former representative (4 years), Illinois 3rd in population (1930)
73	D. Worth Clark (D-ID)	January 3, 1939	Former representative (4 years), Idaho 42nd in population (1930)
74	Clyde M. Reed (R-KS)	January 3, 1939	Former governor
75	Robert A. Taft (R-OH)	January 3, 1939	Ohio 4th in population (1930)
76	Sheridan Downey (D-CA)	January 3, 1939	California 6th in population (1930)
77	Alexander Wiley (R-WI)	January 3, 1939	Wisconsin 13th in population (1930)
78	John A. Danaher (R-CT)	January 3, 1939	Connecticut 29th in population (1930)
79	Rufus C. Holman (R-OR)	January 3, 1939	Oregon 34th in population (1930)
80	John Chandler Gurney (R-SD)	January 3, 1939	South Dakota 36th in population (1930)
81	Albert B. Chandler (D-KY)	October 9, 1939	
82	John Thomas (R-ID)	January 27, 1940	
83	Joseph H. Ball (R-MN)	October 14, 1940	
84	C. Wayland Brooks (R-IL)	November 22, 1940	
85	Berkeley L. Bunker (D-NV)	November 27, 1940	
86	Monrad C. Wallgren (D-WA)	December 19, 1940	
87	Abe Murdock (D-UT)	January 3, 1941	Former representative (8 years)
88	Ralph Owen Brewster (R-ME)	January 3, 1941	Former representative (6 years)
89	William Langer (R-ND)	January 3, 1941	Former governor
90	Harold H. Burton (R-OH)	January 3, 1941	Ohio 4th in population (1940)
91	Raymond E. Willis (R-IN)	January 3, 1941	Indiana 12th in population (1940)
92	Harley M. Kilgore (D-WV)	January 3, 1941	West Virginia 24th in population (1940)
93	Hugh A. Butler (R-NE)	January 3, 1941	Nebraska 32nd in population (1940)
94	Ernest McFarland (D-AZ)	January 3, 1941	Arizona 43rd in population (1940)
95	James M. Tunnell (D-DE)	January 3, 1941	Delaware 47th in population (1940)
96	George Aiken (R-VT)	January 10, 1941	
	Joseph Rosier (D-WV)	January 13, 1941	
	G. Lloyd Spencer (D-AR)	April 1, 1941	
	Andrew Jackson Houston (D-TX)	April 21, 1941	
	James Eastland (D-MS)	June 30, 1941	
	Alva M. Lumpkin (D-SC)	July 22, 1941	
	W. Lee O'Daniel (D-TX)	August 4, 1941	
	Roger C. Peace (D-SC)	August 5, 1941	
	Wall Doxey (D-MS)	September 29, 1941	
	Burnet R. Maybank (D-SC)	November 5, 1941	
	Eugene D. Millikin (R-CO)	December 20, 1941	
	Arthur E. Nelson (R-MN)	November 18, 1942	Minnesota 18th in population (1940)
	Hugh I. Shott (R-WV)	November 18, 1942	West Virginia 24th in population (1940)
	James G. Scrugham (D-NV)	December 7, 1942	

The most senior senators by class were Kenneth McKellar (D-Tennessee) from Class 1, Morris Sheppard (D-Texas) from Class 2, and Ellison D. Smith (D-South Carolina) from Class 3.

== See also ==
- 77th United States Congress
- List of United States representatives in the 77th Congress
