= Patrick J. Sullivan (Pennsylvania politician) =

American politician

Patrick Joseph Sullivan (October 12, 1877 – December 31, 1946) was Republican member of the United States House of Representatives for Pennsylvania.

== Biography ==
Patrick Joseph Sullivan was born in Pittsburgh, Pennsylvania. He was employed in the Homestead Axle Works, Homestead, Pennsylvania, from 1890 to 1900, and in the steel mills at Pittsburgh from 1900 to 1909. He was a member of the city council from 1906 to 1909, and served as alderman from 1910 to 1929, police magistrate from 1916 to 1923, and member of the board of assessment and tax revision for Allegheny County, Pennsylvania from 1923 to 1929.

He was elected in 1928 as a Republican to the 71st and 72nd Congresses. He was an unsuccessful candidate for renomination in 1932. He was city police magistrate in Pittsburgh from 1936 until his death there. He was interred in Calvary Cemetery, Pittsburgh, Pennsylvania.

== Sources ==
- United States Congress. "Patrick J. Sullivan (id: S001059)". Biographical Directory of the United States Congress.

U.S. House of Representatives
Preceded by John M. Morin	Member of the U.S. House of Representatives from Pennsylvania's 34th congressional district 1929–1933	Succeeded by Matthew A. Dunn
