= Stephen G. Porter =

American politician (1869–1930)

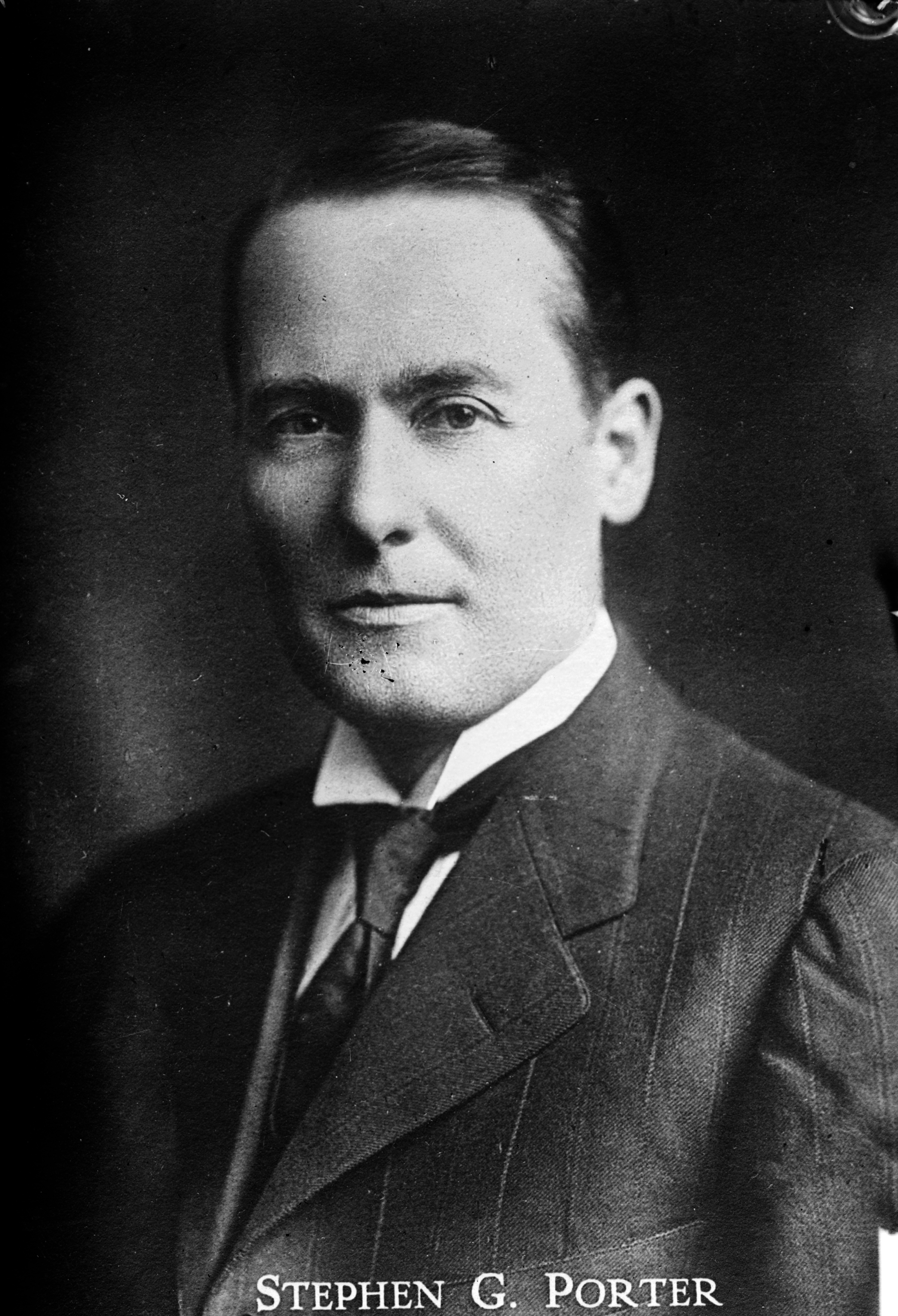

Member of the U.S. House of Representatives from Pennsylvania
- In office March 4, 1911 – June 27, 1930
- Preceded by: William H. Graham (29th); Guy E. Campbell (32nd)
- Succeeded by: Milton W. Shreve (29th); Edmund F. Erk (32nd)
- Constituency: 29th district (1911-23); 32nd district (1923-30)

Personal details
- Born: May 18, 1869 near Salem, Ohio, U.S.
- Died: June 27, 1930 (aged 61) Pittsburgh, Pennsylvania, U.S.
- Party: Republican

Stephen Geyer Porter (May 18, 1869 – June 27, 1930) was a Republican member of the U.S. House of Representatives from Pennsylvania.

== Biography ==
Porter was born near Salem, Ohio. In 1877, he moved to Pennsylvania with his parents, who settled in Allegheny, Pennsylvania (now part of Pittsburgh). He attended Allegheny High School and studied medicine for two years, after which he studied law. He was admitted to the bar in December 1893 and commenced practice in Pittsburgh. He was city solicitor of Allegheny from 1903 to 1906. He was chairman of the Republican State convention in 1912.

Porter was elected as a Republican to the Sixty-second and to the nine succeeding Congresses and served until his death. He was the Chairman of the United States House Committee on Foreign Affairs during the Sixty-sixth through Seventy-first Congresses. He was an unsuccessful candidate for Mayor of Pittsburgh in 1913. He was appointed in 1921 to represent the United States House of Representatives on the advisory committee to the Washington conference on armament limitations, and he represented the United States at the centennial of Brazil’s independence, in 1922. He was a member and chairman of the American delegation to the Second International Conference on Opium, at Geneva in 1924 and 1925, although he unexpectedly withdrew the American delegation prior to the Conference's conclusion. The American delegation's proposals for more stringent drug control were rejected.

Porter also served as chairman of the House Committee on Foreign Affairs, in which capacity he drafted the "Porter Resolution", passed by the House, which authorized the president to place the United States' relations with China on a footing of equality. He was also chairman of the Foreign Service Buildings Commission from 1926 to 1930. He died in Pittsburgh and was interred in Highwood Cemetery.

== See also ==
- List of members of the United States Congress who died in office (1900–1949)

== Sources ==
- United States Congress. "Stephen G. Porter (id: P000447)". Biographical Directory of the United States Congress.
- The Political Graveyard

U.S. House of Representatives
Preceded by William H. Graham	Member of the U.S. House of Representatives from Pennsylvania's 29th congressional district 1911–1923	Succeeded by Milton W. Shreve
Preceded by Guy E. Campbell	Member of the U.S. House of Representatives from Pennsylvania's 32nd congressional district 1923–1930	Succeeded by Edmund F. Erk
