= Matthew A. Dunn =

American politician

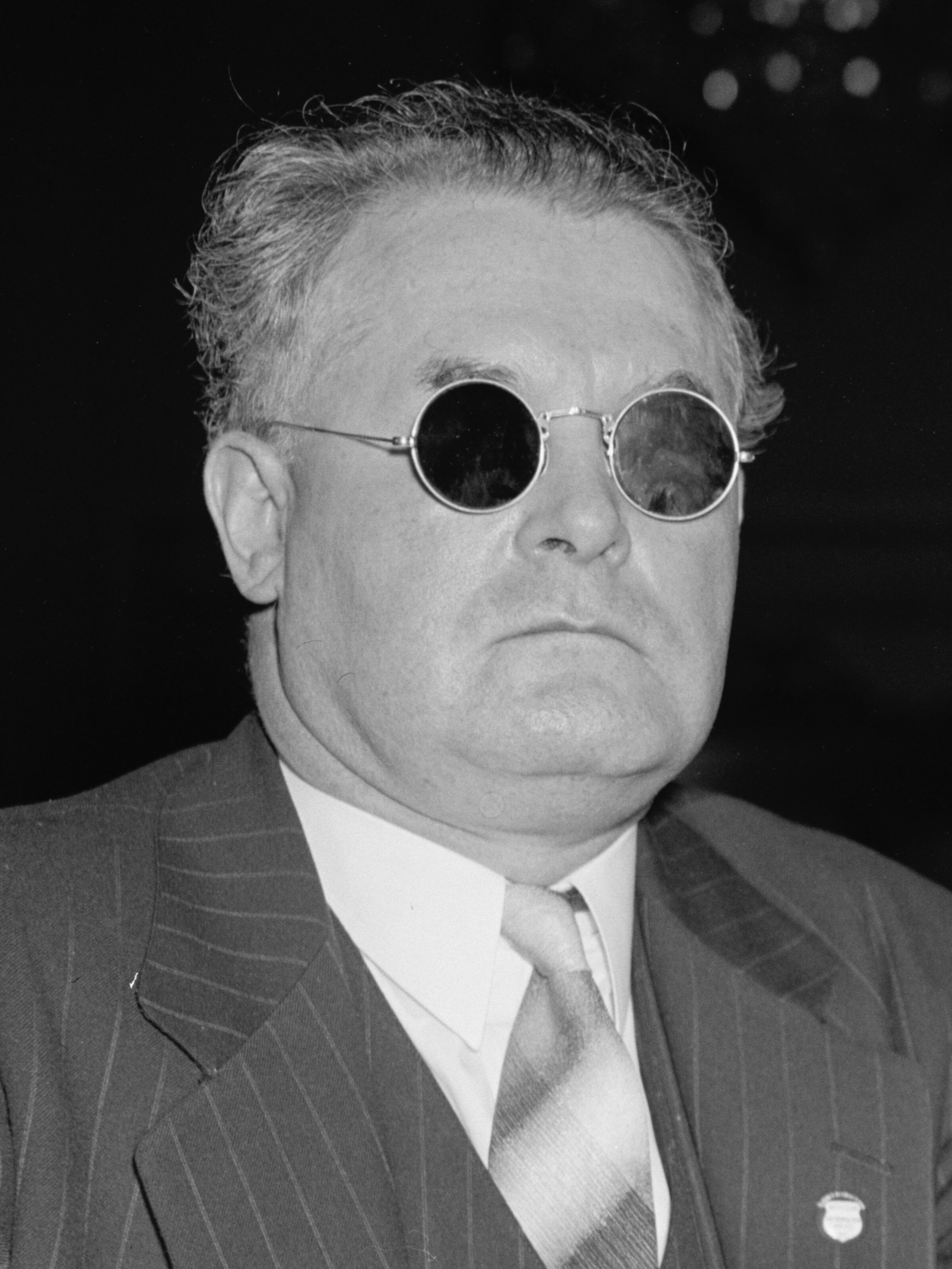
- Dunn in 1940

Member of the U.S. House of Representatives from Pennsylvania's 34th district
- In office March 4, 1933 – January 3, 1941
- Preceded by: Patrick J. Sullivan
- Succeeded by: James A. Wright

Member of the Pennsylvania House of Representatives
- In office 1926–1932

Personal details
- Born: Matthew Anthony Dunn; August 15, 1886 Braddock, Pennsylvania, U.S.
- Died: February 13, 1942 (aged 55) Pittsburgh, Pennsylvania, U.S.
- Party: Democratic

Matthew Anthony Dunn (August 15, 1886 – February 13, 1942) was a Democratic member of the U.S. House of Representatives from Pennsylvania.

== Biography ==
Matthew A. Dunn was born in Braddock, Pennsylvania. As a result of numerous accidents he lost the sight of his left eye at the age of twelve and that of his right eye at the age of twenty. He attended the School for the Blind in Pittsburgh and graduated from Overbrook School for the Blind in Overbrook, Philadelphia, Pennsylvania, in 1909. He was engaged in the sale of periodicals and newspapers in 1907 and 1908, and in the insurance brokerage business from 1920 to 1924. He was member of the Pennsylvania State House of Representatives from 1926 to 1932.

Dunn was elected as a Democrat to the Seventy-third and to the three succeeding Congresses. He served as Chairman of the United States House Committee on the Census during the Seventy-sixth Congress. He was not a candidate for renomination in 1940 due to ill health, and thus retired from active business. He died in Pittsburgh, Pennsylvania, and was interred in Homewood Cemetery.

U.S. House of Representatives
Preceded by Patrick J. Sullivan	Member of the U.S. House of Representatives from Pennsylvania's 34th congressional district 1933–1941	Succeeded by James A. Wright
