= James A. Wright (Pennsylvania politician) =

American lawyer and politician

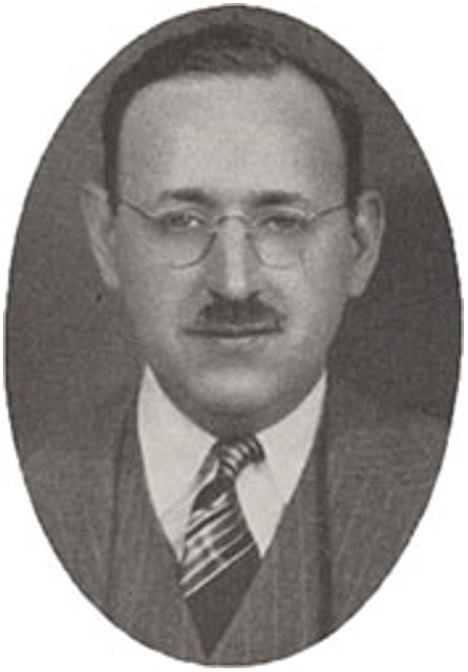

Member of the U.S. House of Representatives from Pennsylvania's 34th district
- In office January 3, 1941 – January 3, 1945
- Preceded by: Matthew A. Dunn
- Succeeded by: Herman P. Eberharter

Personal details
- Born: James Assion Wright; August 11, 1902 Carnegie, Pennsylvania, U.S.
- Died: November 7, 1963 (aged 61) Scott Township, Pennsylvania, U.S.
- Resting place: Holy Souls Cemetery in Carnegie
- Party: Republican
- Education: College of the Holy Cross (BA); University of Pittsburgh (LLB)

James Assion Wright (August 11, 1902 – November 7, 1963) was an American lawyer and politician from Pennsylvania who served two terms in the U.S. Congress from 1941 to 1945.

== Biography ==
Wright was born in Carnegie, Pennsylvania on August 11, 1902. He graduated from the College of the Holy Cross in Worcester, Massachusetts in 1923 and from the University of Pittsburgh School of Law in Pittsburgh, Pennsylvania in 1927.

He served as assistant county solicitor of Allegheny County, Pennsylvania from 1935 to 1941.

=== Congress ===
In 1940, Wright was elected as a Democrat to the 77th United States Congress, then reelected to the 78th United States Congress in 1942. He was an unsuccessful candidate for reelection in 1944.

== Death ==
Wright died in Scott Township on November 7, 1963, at the age of 61. His body was interred at Holy Souls Cemetery in Carnegie, Pennsylvania.

== Sources ==
- United States Congress. "James A. Wright (id: W000762)". Biographical Directory of the United States Congress.
- The Political Graveyard

U.S. House of Representatives
Preceded by Matthew A. Dunn	Member of the U.S. House of Representatives from Pennsylvania's 34th congressional district 1941–1943	Succeeded by District Eliminated
Preceded by Herman P. Eberharter	Member of the U.S. House of Representatives from Pennsylvania's 32nd congressional district 1943–1945	Succeeded by Herman P. Eberharter
