= Theodore L. Moritz =

American politician

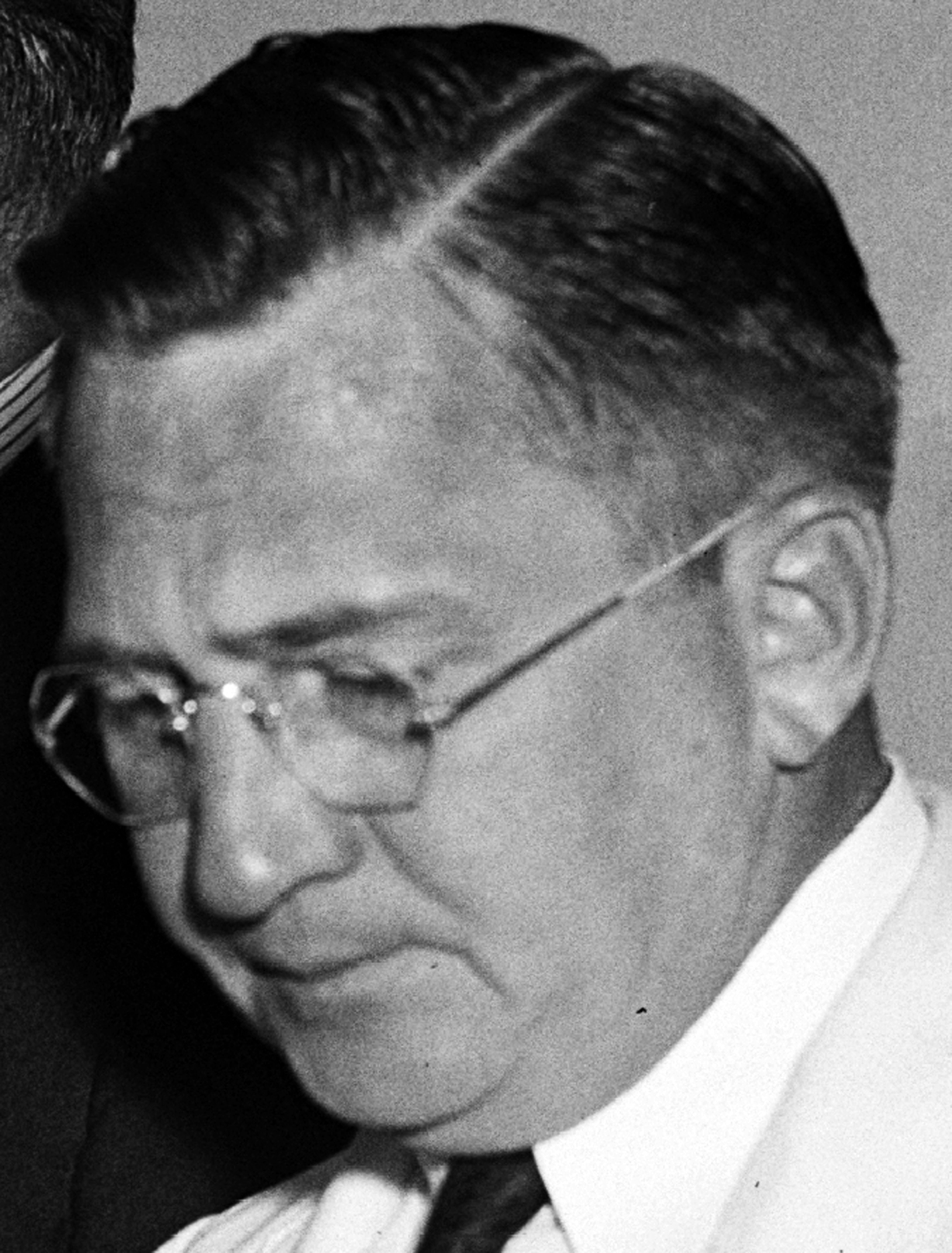
Moritz in 1935

Theodore Leo Moritz (February 10, 1892 – March 13, 1982) was a Democratic member of the U.S. House of Representatives from Pennsylvania.

He was born in Toledo, Ohio. He graduated from St. Mary's Institute in Dayton, Ohio, in 1913, and the University of Dayton in 1919. He attended the law department of the Duquesne University in Pittsburgh, Pennsylvania, from 1920 to 1923. He was engaged as a teacher in parochial schools in Dayton from 1910 to 1913, in Cleveland, Ohio, from 1913 to 1916, and in the Duquesne University Prep School in Pittsburgh from 1918 to 1923. He was admitted to the bar in 1924 and commenced practice in Pittsburgh in 1925. He served as secretary to the Mayor of Pittsburgh from 1933 to 1935.

Moritz was elected as a Democrat to the Seventy-fourth Congress. He did not seek renomination as a Democrat, but was an unsuccessful candidate for nomination as a Republican and ran for reelection as an Independent candidate in 1936.

== Sources ==
- United States Congress. "Theodore L. Moritz (id: M000962)". Biographical Directory of the United States Congress.
- The Political Graveyard

U.S. House of Representatives
| Preceded by Michael J. Muldowney | Member of the U.S. House of Representatives from Pennsylvania's 32nd congressional district 1935–1937 | Succeeded by Herman P. Eberharter |
