= Pennsylvania's 32nd congressional district =

Former U.S. House district in Pennsylvania

Coordinates: 40°30′N 80°00′W

- Obsolete district
- Created: 1903
- Eliminated: 1950
- Years active: 1903-1953

Pennsylvania's 32nd congressional district was one of Pennsylvania's districts of the United States House of Representatives.

== Geography ==
The district was located on the north side of Pittsburgh, Pennsylvania, in the area formerly known as Allegheny City, Pennsylvania.

== History ==
This district was created in 1903. The district was eliminated in 1953.

== List of representatives ==
Representative	Party	Years	Cong ress	Electoral history
District established March 4, 1903
James W. Brown (Pittsburgh)	Independent; Republican	March 4, 1903 – March 3, 1905	58th	Elected in 1902. Retired.
Andrew J. Barchfeld (Pittsburgh)	Republican	March 3, 1905 – March 3, 1917	59th 60th 61st 62nd 63rd 64th	Elected in 1904. Re-elected in 1906. Re-elected in 1908. Re-elected in 1910. Re-elected in 1912. Re-elected in 1914. Retired.
Guy E. Campbell (Crafton)	Democratic	March 4, 1917 – March 3, 1923	65th 66th 67th	Re-elected in 1916. Re-elected in 1918; Re-elected in 1920. Redistricted to the 36th district.
Stephen G. Porter (Pittsburgh)	Republican	March 4, 1923 – June 27, 1930	68th 69th 70th 71st	Redistricted from the 29th district and re-elected in 1922. Re-elected in 1924. Re-elected in 1926. Re-elected in 1928. Died.
Vacant		June 27, 1930 – November 4, 1930	71st	
Edmund F. Erk (Pittsburgh)	Republican	November 4, 1930 – March 3, 1933	71st 72nd	Elected to finish Porter's term. Re-elected in 1930. Lost renomination.
Michael J. Muldowney (Pittsburgh)	Republican	March 4, 1933 – January 3, 1935	73rd	Elected in 1932. Lost re-election.
Theodore L. Moritz (Pittsburgh)	Democratic	January 3, 1935 – January 3, 1937	74th	Elected in 1934. Lost renomination.
Herman P. Eberharter (Pittsburgh)	Democratic	January 3, 1937 – January 3, 1943	75th 76th 77th	Elected in 1936. Re-elected in 1938. Re-elected in 1940. Redistricted to the 31st district.
James A. Wright (Carnegie)	Democratic	January 3, 1943 – January 3, 1945	78th	Redistricted from the 34th district and re-elected in 1942. Lost re-election.
Herman P. Eberharter (Pittsburgh)	Democratic	January 3, 1945 – January 3, 1953	79th 80th 81st 82nd	Redistricted from the 31st district and re-elected in 1944. Re-elected in 1946. Re-elected in 1948. Re-elected in 1950. Redistricted to the 28th district.
District dissolved January 3, 1953
