= Herman P. Eberharter =

American politician

Herman Eberharter
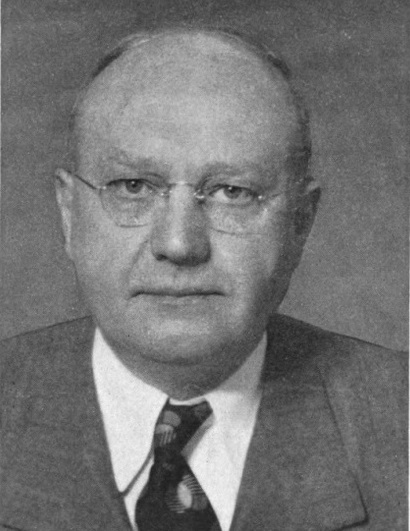

Member of the U.S. House of Representatives from Pennsylvania
- In office January 3, 1937 – September 9, 1958
- Preceded by: Theodore L. Moritz
- Succeeded by: William S. Moorhead
- Constituency: 32nd district (1937–1943); 31st district (1943–1945); 32nd district (1945–1953); 28th district (1953–1958)

Member of the Pennsylvania House of Representatives
- In office 1935–1936

Personal details
- Born: April 29, 1892 Pittsburgh, Pennsylvania, U.S.
- Died: September 9, 1958 (aged 66) Arlington, Virginia, U.S.
- Party: Democratic

Herman Peter Eberharter (April 29, 1892 – September 9, 1958) was a Democratic member of the U.S. House of Representatives from Pennsylvania.

== Biography ==
Eberharter was born in Pittsburgh, Pennsylvania; his father was an immigrant from Austria and his maternal grandparents were German immigrants. During the First World War, he served in the United States Army as a private in the 20th Infantry Regiment and was commissioned as a second lieutenant. He continued to serve in the military as a member of the Officers' Reserve Corps, and attained the rank of major. He graduated from Duquesne University Law School in 1925 and became an attorney in Pittsburgh. He became a member of the Pennsylvania House of Representatives in 1935 and 1936.

He was elected as a Democrat to the Seventy-fifth and to the ten succeeding Congresses. He served from January 3, 1937, until his death in Arlington, Virginia. He was buried at Mount Carmel Cemetery in Pittsburgh

In 1945, Ebeharter introduced the legislation that gave official Congressional approval of the Pledge of Allegiance. Beginning with the 78th United States Congress, he sat as a member of the United States House Committee on Ways and Means.

Eberharter was a member of the Dies Committee, which received the "Yellow Report" alleging Japanese-American espionage during World War II based on cultural traits such as Buddhist faith and a high proportion of fishermen among the population. Eberharter was the only member of the committee to openly express opposition to wartime internment of Japanese Americans.

A confidential 1943 analysis of the House Foreign Affairs Committee by Isaiah Berlin for the British Foreign Office described Eberharter as

A New Dealer from Pittsburg [sic] of Austrian origin; internationalist-minded, and perhaps inclined to go slightly faster and further than the Administration. His position is well indicated by the fact that recently he urged that in the renewal of Lend-Lease there should be no implication in the wording that repayment is expected from the recipients. A Catholic; age 50; interested in the Austrian Legion.

== See also ==
- List of members of the United States Congress who died in office (1950–1999)
- List of members of the House Un-American Activities Committee

U.S. House of Representatives
Preceded by Theodore L. Moritz	Member of the U.S. House of Representatives from Pennsylvania's 32nd congressional district 1937–1943	Succeeded by James A. Wright
Preceded by Samuel A. Weiss	Member of the U.S. House of Representatives from Pennsylvania's 31st congressional district 1943–1945	Succeeded by James G. Fulton
Preceded by James A. Wright	Member of the U.S. House of Representatives from Pennsylvania's 32nd congressional district 1945–1953	Succeeded by District eliminated
Preceded by Carroll D. Kearns	Member of the U.S. House of Representatives from Pennsylvania's 28th congressional district 1953–1958	Succeeded by William S. Moorhead
