= Pennsylvania's 34th congressional district =

Former U.S. House district in Pennsylvania

Coordinates: 40°30′N 79°55′W

- Obsolete district
- Created: 1920
- Eliminated: 1950
- Years active: 1923-1953

Pennsylvania's 34th congressional district was one of Pennsylvania's districts of the United States House of Representatives. It covered area north of the city of Pittsburgh, Pennsylvania.

== History ==
This district was created in 1913. Until 1923, the seat was held "at-large". The district was eliminated in 1943.

== List of members representing the district ==
Member	Party	Years	Cong ress	Electoral history
District established March 4, 1923
John M. Morin (Pittsburgh)	Republican	March 4, 1923 – March 3, 1929	68th 69th 70th	Redistricted from the 31st district and re-elected in 1922. Re-elected in 1924. Re-elected in 1926. Lost renomination.
Patrick J. Sullivan (Pittsburgh)	Republican	March 4, 1929 – March 3, 1933	71st 72nd	Elected in 1928. Re-elected in 1930. Lost renomination.
Matthew A. Dunn (Pittsburgh)	Democratic	March 4, 1933 – January 3, 1941	73rd 74th 75th 76th	Elected in 1932. Re-elected in 1934. Re-elected in 1936. Re-elected in 1938. Retired.
James A. Wright (Carnegie)	Democratic	January 3, 1941 – January 3, 1943	77th	Elected in 1940. Redistricted to the 32nd district.
District dissolved January 3, 1943
