= Arizona's at-large congressional district =

Historical U.S. House district in the state of Arizona

- Obsolete district
- Created: 1912
- Eliminated: 1949
- Years active: 1912-1949

When Arizona became a state in 1912, it was allocated a single seat in the United States House of Representatives, whose member was elected at-large, or statewide.

Arizona was represented by a single member of the House until the 1940 census gave Arizona a second seat. However, both members continued to be elected statewide (on a general ticket) until 1949.

== List of members representing the district ==
Years	Cong ress	Seat A			Seat B		
Years	Cong ress	Member	Party	Electoral history	Member	Party	Electoral history
District created in 1912					Second seat added in 1943		
February 19, 1912 – March 3, 1927	62nd 63rd 64th 65th 66th 67th 68th 69th	Carl Hayden (Phoenix)	Democratic	Elected December 12, 1911. Re-elected in 1912. Re-elected in 1914. Re-elected in 1916. Re-elected in 1918. Re-elected in 1920. Re-elected in 1922. Re-elected in 1924. Retired to run for U.S. senator.	Second seat added in 1943		
March 4, 1927 – March 4, 1933	70th 71st 72nd 73rd	Lewis W. Douglas (Phoenix)	Democratic	Elected in 1926. Re-elected in 1928. Re-elected in 1930. Re-elected in 1932. Resigned to become Director of U.S. Office of Management and Budget.	Second seat added in 1943		
March 4, 1933 – October 3, 1933	73rd	Vacant			Second seat added in 1943		
October 3, 1933 – January 3, 1937	73rd 74th	Isabella Greenway (Ajo)	Democratic	Elected to finish Douglas's term. Re-elected in 1934. Retired.	Second seat added in 1943		
January 3, 1937 – January 3, 1943	75th 76th 77th	John R. Murdock (Phoenix)	Democratic	Elected in 1936. Re-elected in 1938. Re-elected in 1940. Re-elected in 1942. Re-elected in 1944. Re-elected in 1946. Redistricted to 1st district and re-elected there.	Second seat added in 1943		
January 3, 1943 – January 3, 1949	78th 79th 80th	John R. Murdock (Phoenix)	Democratic	Elected in 1936. Re-elected in 1938. Re-elected in 1940. Re-elected in 1942. Re-elected in 1944. Re-elected in 1946. Redistricted to 1st district and re-elected there.	Richard F. Harless (Tempe)	Democratic	Elected in 1942. Re-elected in 1944. Re-elected in 1946. Retired to run for Governor of Arizona.
District eliminated January 3, 1949
