= Harless =

Harless is a surname. Notable people with the surname include:

- Gottlieb Christoph Adolf von Harless
- Gottlieb Christoph Harless
- James H. Harless (1919–2014), American business executive
- Meredith Howard Harless
- Patricia Harless, member of the Texas House of Representatives from Harris County
- Richard F. Harless
- William G. Harless
