= 1950 Arizona gubernatorial election =

- November 7, 1950
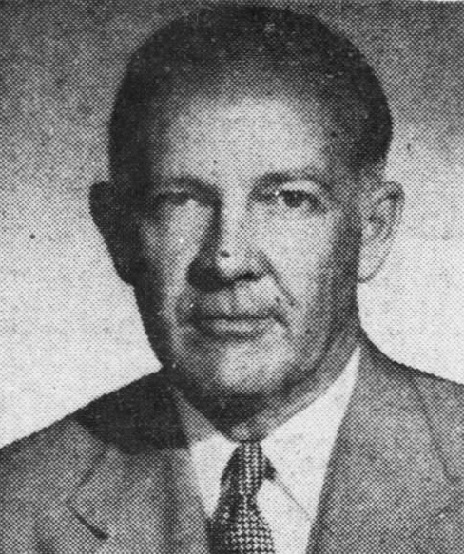

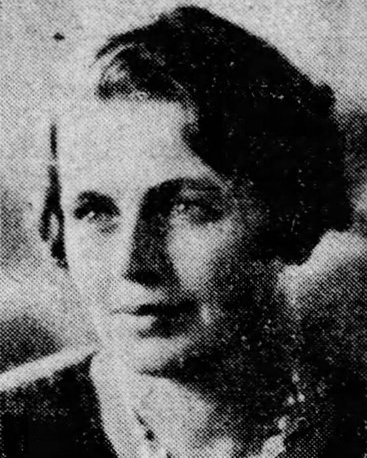
Nominee	John Howard Pyle	Ana Frohmiller
Party	Republican	Democratic
Popular vote	99,109	96,118
Percentage	50.77%	49.23%
- County results Pyle: 50–60% Frohmiller: 50–60% 60–70% 70–80%
Governor before election
Dan Edward Garvey
Democratic
Elected Governor
John Howard Pyle
Republican

The 1950 Arizona gubernatorial election took place on November 7, 1950. Incumbent governor Dan Edward Garvey, who originally ascended to the office of governor following the death of Sidney Preston Osborn and was later elected to a full term, lost the Democratic primary to state Auditor Ana Frohmiller. Frohmiller would become the first woman to be nominated by any party for governor in Arizona.

Following a shift in voters to the Republican Party in the past two election cycles, John Howard Pyle narrowly defeated Ana Frohmiller, becoming the first Republican governor of Arizona since John Calhoun Phillips was defeated for reelection and left office in 1931.

== Democratic primary ==
The Democratic primary took place on September 12, 1950. Incumbent governor Dan Edward Garvey, who ascended to the office of governor (as Secretary of State of Arizona) following the death of Governor Sidney Preston Osborn, and was subsequently elected to a full term in 1948, was defeated in the Democratic primary by State Auditor Ana Frohmiller. Frohmiller had served as state auditor since being elected in 1926, and was seen as a pioneer for women. U.S. Congressman Richard F. Harless also ran again after failing to win in 1948, as well as Jim Smith, Ralph Watkins, and perennial candidate Howard Sprouse.

=== Candidates ===
- Dan Edward Garvey, incumbent governor
- Ana Frohmiller, state auditor
- Richard F. Harless, U.S. Congressman
- Jim Smith
- Ralph Watkins
- Howard Sprouse, perennial candidate

=== Results ===
Democratic primary results
Party	Candidate	Votes	%
Democratic	Ana Frohmiller	42,143	29.24%
Democratic	Dan Edward Garvey (incumbent)	32,493	22.55%
Democratic	Richard F. Harless	31,118	21.59%
Democratic	Jim Smith	19,912	13.82%
Democratic	Ralph Watkins	17,931	12.44%
Democratic	Howard Sprouse	514	0.36%
Total votes		144,111	100.00%

== Republican primary ==
=== Candidates ===
- John Howard Pyle, radio program director, World War II correspondent

== General election ==
U.S. Senator and Republican Presidential candidate Barry Goldwater wrote in his memoir "With No Apologies" that Frohmiller was "an attractive lady [...] who had earned quite a following as a result of her long and excellent service as State Auditor." He also observed that the voters of Arizona weren't ready for a woman governor in 1950. Frohmiller lost the election to Pyle, who became the first Republican governor of Arizona since John Calhoun Phillips was elected in 1928, despite the fact that at the time of her nomination she seemed to be the front-runner.

=== Results ===
Arizona gubernatorial election, 1950 (Note: The Arizona State Library has digitized the original 1950 returns, but has not published them on AZ Memory, though it will provide a pdf upon request)
Party	Candidate	Votes	%	±%
Republican	John Howard Pyle	99,109	50.77%	+10.70%
Democratic	Ana Frohmiller	96,118	49.23%	−9.94%
Majority		2,991	1.54%	
Total votes		195,227	100.00%	
Republican gain from Democratic		Swing	+20.64%	

=== Results by county ===
County	John Howard Pyle Republican		Ana Frohmiller Democratic		Margin		Total votes cast
County	#	%	#	%	#	%	Total votes cast
Apache	1,058	44.32%	1,329	55.68%	-271	-11.35%	2,387
Cochise	3,676	35.33%	6,728	64.67%	-3,052	-29.33%	10,404
Coconino	2,524	54.05%	2,146	45.95%	378	8.09%	4,670
Gila	3,128	39.63%	4,765	60.37%	-1,637	-20.74%	7,893
Graham	1,852	47.89%	2,015	52.11%	-163	-4.22%	3,867
Greenlee	895	25.87%	2,564	74.13%	-1,669	-48.25%	3,459
Maricopa	48,798	53.45%	42,493	46.55%	6,305	6.91%	91,291
Mohave	1,192	47.25%	1,331	52.75%	-139	-5.51%	2,523
Navajo	2,488	52.09%	2,288	47.91%	200	4.19%	4,776
Pima	19,960	54.02%	16,990	45.98%	2,970	8.04%	36,950
Pinal	3,625	47.39%	4,024	52.61%	-399	-5.22%	7,649
Santa Cruz	1,114	42.37%	1,515	57.63%	-401	-15.25%	2,629
Yavapai	4,798	53.89%	4,106	46.11%	692	7.77%	8,904
Yuma	4,001	51.13%	3,824	48.87%	177	2.26%	7,825
Totals	99,109	50.77%	96,118	49.23%	2,991	1.53%	195,227

==== Counties that flipped from Democratic to Republican ====
- Coconino
- Maricopa
- Navajo
- Pima
- Yavapai
- Yuma
