= List of United States representatives in the 80th Congress =

This is a complete list of United States representatives during the 80th United States Congress listed by seniority.

As an historical article, the districts and party affiliations listed reflect those during the 80th Congress (January 3, 1947 – January 3, 1949). Seats and party affiliations on similar lists for other congresses will be different for certain members.

Seniority depends on the date on which members were sworn into office. Since many members are sworn in on the same day, subsequent ranking is based on previous congressional service of the individual and then by alphabetical order by the last name of the representative.

Committee chairmanship in the House is often associated with seniority. However, party leadership is typically not associated with seniority.

Note: The "*" indicates that the representative/delegate may have served one or more non-consecutive terms while in the House of Representatives of the United States Congress.

== U.S. House seniority list ==
U.S. House seniority
Rank	Representative	Party	District	Seniority date (Previous service, if any)	No.# of term(s)	Notes
1	Adolph J. Sabath	D	IL-05	March 4, 1907	21st term	Dean of the House
2	Robert L. Doughton	D	NC-09	March 4, 1911	19th term	
3	Sam Rayburn	D	TX-04	March 4, 1913	18th term	
4	Carl Vinson	D	GA-06	November 3, 1914	18th term	
5	Harold Knutson	R	MN-06	March 4, 1917	16th term	Left the House in 1949.
6	Clarence F. Lea	D	CA-01	March 4, 1917	16th term	Left the House in 1949.
7	Joseph J. Mansfield	D	TX-09	March 4, 1917	16th term	Died on July 12, 1947.
8	S. Otis Bland	D	VA-01	July 2, 1918	16th term	
9	Daniel A. Reed	R	NY-45	March 4, 1919	15th term	
10	Patrick H. Drewry	D	VA-04	April 27, 1920	15th term	Died on December 21, 1947.
11	John E. Rankin	D	MS-01	March 4, 1921	14th term	
12	Roy O. Woodruff	R	MI-10	March 4, 1921; Previous service, 1913–1915.	15th term*	
13	Charles L. Gifford	R	MA-09	November 7, 1922	14th term	Died on August 23, 1947.
14	Sol Bloom	D	NY-20	March 4, 1923	13th term	
15	Clarence Cannon	D	MO-09	March 4, 1923	13th term	
16	Emanuel Celler	D	NY-15	March 4, 1923	13th term	
17	Robert Crosser	D	OH-21	March 4, 1923; Previous service, 1913–1919.	16th term*	
18	John Taber	R	NY-38	March 4, 1923	13th term	
19	John H. Kerr	D	NC-02	November 6, 1923	13th term	
20	Edward E. Cox	D	GA-02	March 4, 1925	12th term	
21	Charles Aubrey Eaton	R	NJ-05	March 4, 1925	12th term	
22	Thomas A. Jenkins	R	OH-10	March 4, 1925	12th term	
23	Joseph William Martin Jr.	R	MA-14	March 4, 1925	12th term	Speaker of the House
24	Mary Teresa Norton	D	NJ-13	March 4, 1925	12th term	
25	Andrew Lawrence Somers	D	NY-10	March 4, 1925	12th term	
26	William Madison Whittington	D	MS-03	March 4, 1925	12th term	
27	Edith Nourse Rogers	R	MA-05	June 30, 1925	12th term	
28	Richard J. Welch	R	CA-05	August 31, 1926	12th term	
29	Clifford R. Hope	R	KS-05	March 4, 1927	11th term	
30	Charles A. Wolverton	R	NJ-01	March 4, 1927	11th term	
31	John William McCormack	D	MA-12	November 6, 1928	11th term	
32	Richard B. Wigglesworth	R	MA-13	November 6, 1928	11th term	
33	J. Bayard Clark	D	NC-07	March 4, 1929	10th term	Left the House in 1949.
34	Jere Cooper	D	TN-09	March 4, 1929	10th term	
35	Wright Patman	D	TX-01	March 4, 1929	10th term	
36	Fred A. Hartley	R	NJ-10	March 4, 1929	10th term	Left the House in 1949.
37	Louis Ludlow	D	IN-11	March 4, 1929	10th term	Left the House in 1949.
38	Walter G. Andrews	R	NY-42	March 4, 1931	9th term	Left the House in 1949.
39	Alfred L. Bulwinkle	D	NC-11	March 4, 1931; Previous service, 1921–1929.	13th term*	
40	Virgil Chapman	D	KY-06	March 4, 1931; Previous service, 1925–1929.	11th term*	Left the House in 1949.
41	John W. Flannagan Jr.	D	VA-09	March 4, 1931	9th term	Left the House in 1949.
42	Howard W. Smith	D	VA-08	March 4, 1931	9th term	
43	Brent Spence	D	KY-05	March 4, 1931	9th term	
44	R. Ewing Thomason	D	TX-16	March 4, 1931	9th term	Resigned on July 31, 1947.
45	Jesse P. Wolcott	R	MI-07	March 4, 1931	9th term	
46	John J. Delaney	D	NY-07	November 3, 1931; Previous service, 1918–1919.	10th term*	Died on November 18, 1948.
47	Leo E. Allen	R	IL-13	March 4, 1933	8th term	
48	William M. Colmer	D	MS-06	March 4, 1933	8th term	
49	John D. Dingell Sr.	D	MI-15	March 4, 1933	8th term	
50	Everett Dirksen	R	IL-16	March 4, 1933	8th term	Left the House in 1949.
51	George Anthony Dondero	R	MI-17	March 4, 1933	8th term	
52	John Kee	D	WV-05	March 4, 1933	8th term	
53	John Lesinski Sr.	D	MI-16	March 4, 1933	8th term	
54	J. Hardin Peterson	D	FL-01	March 4, 1933	8th term	
55	James P. Richards	D	SC-05	March 4, 1933	8th term	
56	James Wolcott Wadsworth Jr.	R	NY-41	March 4, 1933	8th term	
57	Francis E. Walter	D	PA-20	March 4, 1933	8th term	
58	Milton H. West	D	TX-15	April 23, 1933	8th term	Died on October 28, 1948.
59	Paul Brown	D	GA-10	July 5, 1933	8th term	
60	Charles Albert Plumley	R	VT	January 16, 1934	8th term	
61	Harold D. Cooley	D	NC-04	July 7, 1934	8th term	
62	August H. Andresen	R	MN-01	January 3, 1935; Previous service, 1925–1933.	11th term*	
63	Leslie C. Arends	R	IL-17	January 3, 1935	7th term	
64	Graham A. Barden	D	NC-03	January 3, 1935	7th term	
65	C. Jasper Bell	D	MO-04	January 3, 1935	7th term	Left the House in 1949.
66	Charles A. Buckley	D	NY-25	January 3, 1935	7th term	
67	W. Sterling Cole	R	NY-39	January 3, 1935	7th term	
68	Fred L. Crawford	R	MI-08	January 3, 1935	7th term	
69	Albert J. Engel	D	MI-09	January 3, 1935	7th term	
70	Bertrand W. Gearhart	R	CA-09	January 3, 1935	7th term	Left the House in 1949.
71	John W. Gwynne	R	IA-03	January 3, 1935	7th term	Left the House in 1949.
72	Edward J. Hart	D	NJ-14	January 3, 1935	7th term	
73	Sam Hobbs	D	AL-04	January 3, 1935	7th term	
74	Clare Hoffman	R	MI-04	January 3, 1935	7th term	
75	Merlin Hull	R	WI-09	January 3, 1935; Previous service, 1929–1931.	8th term*	
76	George H. Mahon	D	TX-19	January 3, 1935	7th term	
77	Earl C. Michener	R	MI-02	January 3, 1935; Previous service, 1919–1933.	14th term*	
78	Joseph L. Pfeifer	D	NY-08	January 3, 1935	7th term	
79	Chauncey W. Reed	R	IL-11	January 3, 1935	7th term	
80	John M. Robsion	R	KY-09	January 3, 1935; Previous service, 1919–1930.	13th term*	Died on February 17, 1948.
81	Dewey Jackson Short	R	MO-07	January 3, 1935; Previous service, 1929–1931.	8th term*	
82	Karl Stefan	R	NE-03	January 3, 1935	7th term	
83	Orville Zimmerman	D	MO-10	January 3, 1935	7th term	Died on April 7, 1948.
84	Charles A. Halleck	R	IN-02	January 29, 1935	7th term	
85	Frank W. Boykin	D	AL-01	July 30, 1935	7th term	
86	A. Leonard Allen	D	LA-08	January 3, 1937	6th term	
87	George J. Bates	R	MA-06	January 3, 1937	6th term	
88	Overton Brooks	D	LA-04	January 3, 1937	6th term	
89	William T. Byrne	D	NY-32	January 3, 1937	6th term	
90	Francis Case	R	SD-02	January 3, 1937	6th term	
91	Charles R. Clason	R	MA-02	January 3, 1937	6th term	Left the House in 1949.
92	Herman P. Eberharter	D	PA-32	January 3, 1937	6th term	
93	Noble Jones Gregory	D	KY-01	January 3, 1937	6th term	
94	Joe Hendricks	D	FL-05	January 3, 1937	6th term	Left the House in 1949.
95	Pete Jarman	D	AL-06	January 3, 1937	6th term	Left the House in 1949.
96	Eugene James Keogh	D	NY-09	January 3, 1937	6th term	
97	Michael J. Kirwan	D	OH-19	January 3, 1937	6th term	
98	Noah M. Mason	R	IL-12	January 3, 1937	6th term	
99	John R. Murdock	D	AZ	January 3, 1937	6th term	
100	Donald Lawrence O'Toole	D	NY-13	January 3, 1937	6th term	
101	Stephen Pace	D	GA-03	January 3, 1937	6th term	
102	William R. Poage	D	TX-11	January 3, 1937	6th term	
103	Edward Herbert Rees	R	KS-04	January 3, 1937	6th term	
104	Paul W. Shafer	R	MI-03	January 3, 1937	6th term	
105	Harry R. Sheppard	D	CA-21	January 3, 1937	6th term	
106	Albert Thomas	D	TX-08	January 3, 1937	6th term	
107	J. Parnell Thomas	R	NJ-07	January 3, 1937	6th term	
108	Lyndon B. Johnson	D	TX-10	April 10, 1937	6th term	Left the House in 1949.
109	Alfred J. Elliott	D	CA-10	May 4, 1937	6th term	Left the House in 1949.
110	Richard M. Simpson	R	PA-17	May 11, 1937	6th term	
111	Ralph A. Gamble	R	NY-28	November 2, 1937	6th term	
112	Joe B. Bates	D	KY-08	June 4, 1938	6th term	
113	George M. Grant	D	AL-02	June 14, 1938	6th term	
114	Herman Carl Andersen	R	MN-07	January 3, 1939	5th term	
115	Jack Z. Anderson	R	CA-08	January 3, 1939	5th term	
116	Homer D. Angell	R	OR-03	January 3, 1939	5th term	
117	Lindley Beckworth	D	TX-03	January 3, 1939	5th term	
118	George H. Bender	R	OH	January 3, 1939	5th term	Left the House in 1949.
119	William W. Blackney	R	MI-06	January 3, 1939; Previous service, 1935–1937.	6th term*	
120	Frederick Van Ness Bradley	R	MI-11	January 3, 1939	5th term	Died on May 24, 1947.
121	Clarence J. Brown	R	OH-07	January 3, 1939	5th term	
122	Joseph R. Bryson	D	SC-04	January 3, 1939	5th term	
123	Robert B. Chiperfield	R	IL-15	January 3, 1939	5th term	
124	Cliff Clevenger	R	OH-05	January 3, 1939	5th term	
125	Carl Curtis	R	NE-01	January 3, 1939	5th term	
126	Thomas D'Alesandro Jr.	D	MD-03	January 3, 1939	5th term	Resigned on May 16, 1947.
127	Carl T. Durham	D	NC-06	January 3, 1939	5th term	
128	Charles H. Elston	R	OH-01	January 3, 1939	5th term	
129	Ivor D. Fenton	R	PA-12	January 3, 1939	5th term	
130	Ezekiel C. Gathings	D	AR-01	January 3, 1939	5th term	
131	Charles L. Gerlach	R	PA-08	January 3, 1939	5th term	Died on May 5, 1947.
132	George W. Gillie	R	IN-04	January 3, 1939	5th term	Left the House in 1949.
133	Ed Gossett	D	TX-13	January 3, 1939	5th term	
134	Louis E. Graham	R	PA-25	January 3, 1939	5th term	
135	Robert A. Grant	R	IN-03	January 3, 1939	5th term	Left the House in 1949.
136	Leonard W. Hall	R	NY-02	January 3, 1939	5th term	
137	Forest Harness	R	IN-05	January 3, 1939	5th term	Left the House in 1949.
138	William E. Hess	R	OH-02	January 3, 1939; Previous service, 1929–1937.	9th term*	Left the House in 1949.
139	John Carl Hinshaw	R	CA-20	January 3, 1939	5th term	
140	Ben F. Jensen	R	IA-07	January 3, 1939	5th term	
141	Anton J. Johnson	R	IL-14	January 3, 1939	5th term	Left the House in 1949.
142	Noble J. Johnson	R	IN-06	January 3, 1939; Previous service, 1925–1931.	8th term*	Resigned on July 1, 1948.
143	Robert Franklin Jones	R	OH-04	January 3, 1939	5th term	Resigned on September 2, 1947.
144	Robert Kean	R	NJ-12	January 3, 1939	5th term	
145	Frank Bateman Keefe	R	WI-06	January 3, 1939	5th term	
146	Paul J. Kilday	D	TX-20	January 3, 1939	5th term	
147	John C. Kunkel	R	PA-18	January 3, 1939	5th term	
148	Gerald W. Landis	R	IN-07	January 3, 1939	5th term	Left the House in 1949.
149	Karl M. LeCompte	R	IA-04	January 3, 1939	5th term	
150	Vito Marcantonio	ALP	NY-18	January 3, 1939; Previous service, 1935–1937.	6th term*	
151	Thomas E. Martin	R	IA-01	January 3, 1939	5th term	
152	John L. McMillan	D	SC-06	January 3, 1939	5th term	
153	Wilbur Mills	D	AR-02	January 3, 1939	5th term	
154	Mike Monroney	D	OK-05	January 3, 1939	5th term	
155	Karl E. Mundt	R	SD-01	January 3, 1939	5th term	Resigned on December 30, 1948.
156	Reid F. Murray	R	WI-07	January 3, 1939	5th term	
157	William F. Norrell	D	AR-06	January 3, 1939	5th term	
158	Frederick Cleveland Smith	R	OH-08	January 3, 1939	5th term	
159	Raymond S. Springer	R	IN-10	January 3, 1939	5th term	Died on August 28, 1947.
160	Henry O. Talle	R	IA-02	January 3, 1939	5th term	
161	Harve Tibbott	R	PA-26	January 3, 1939	5th term	Left the House in 1949.
162	John Martin Vorys	R	OH-12	January 3, 1939	5th term	
163	Lansdale Ghiselin Sasscer	D	MD-05	February 3, 1939	5th term	
164	W. Wirt Courtney	D	TN-07	May 11, 1939	5th term	Left the House in 1949.
165	Albert Sidney Camp	D	GA-04	August 1, 1939	5th term	
166	William Fadjo Cravens	D	AR-04	September 12, 1939	5th term	Left the House in 1949.
167	Estes Kefauver	D	TN-03	September 13, 1939	5th term	Left the House in 1949.
168	Edwin Arthur Hall	R	NY-37	November 7, 1939	5th term	
169	John Jennings	R	TN-02	December 30, 1939	5th term	
170	Clarence E. Kilburn	R	NY-34	February 13, 1940	5th term	
171	Clifford Davis	D	TN-10	February 14, 1940	5th term	
172	Bartel J. Jonkman	R	MI-05	February 19, 1940	5th term	Left the House in 1949.
173	Walter A. Lynch	D	NY-23	February 20, 1940	5th term	
174	Frances P. Bolton	R	OH-22	February 27, 1940	5th term	
175	J. Harry McGregor	R	OH-17	February 27, 1940	5th term	
176	Margaret Chase Smith	R	ME-02	June 3, 1940	5th term	Left the House in 1949.
177	Herbert Covington Bonner	D	NC-01	November 5, 1940	5th term	
178	C. W. Bishop	R	IL-25	January 3, 1941	4th term	
179	Gordon Canfield	R	NJ-08	January 3, 1941	4th term	
180	John Chenoweth	R	CO-03	January 3, 1941	4th term	Left the House in 1949.
181	Paul Cunningham	R	IA-05	January 3, 1941	4th term	
182	Frank Fellows	R	ME-03	January 3, 1941	4th term	
183	Aime Forand	D	RI-01	January 3, 1941; Previous service, 1937–1939.	5th term*	
184	Walter K. Granger	D	UT-01	January 3, 1941	4th term	
185	Oren Harris	D	AR-07	January 3, 1941	4th term	
186	Felix Edward Hébert	D	LA-01	January 3, 1941	4th term	
187	James J. Heffernan	D	NY-11	January 3, 1941	4th term	
188	William S. Hill	R	CO-02	January 3, 1941	4th term	
189	George Evan Howell	R	IL-21	January 3, 1941	4th term	Resigned on October 5, 1947.
190	Henry M. Jackson	D	WA-02	January 3, 1941	4th term	
191	Augustine B. Kelley	D	PA-27	January 3, 1941	4th term	
192	Joseph O'Hara	R	MN-02	January 3, 1941	4th term	
193	Walter C. Ploeser	R	MO-12	January 3, 1941	4th term	Left the House in 1949.
194	Percy Priest	D	TN-06	January 3, 1941	4th term	
195	L. Mendel Rivers	D	SC-01	January 3, 1941	4th term	
196	Ross Rizley	R	OK-08	January 3, 1941	4th term	Left the House in 1949.
197	William H. Stevenson	R	WI-03	January 3, 1941	4th term	Left the House in 1949.
198	Earl Wilson	R	IN-09	January 3, 1941	4th term	
199	Eugene Worley	D	TX-18	January 3, 1941	4th term	
200	John Cornelius Butler	R	NY-44	April 22, 1941	4th term	Left the House in 1949.
201	John Hamlin Folger	D	NC-05	June 14, 1941	4th term	Left the House in 1949.
202	Carter Manasco	D	AL-07	June 24, 1941	4th term	Left the House in 1949.
203	Lawrence H. Smith	R	WI-01	August 29, 1941	4th term	
204	Wilson D. Gillette	R	PA-14	November 4, 1941	4th term	
205	Jamie Whitten	D	MS-02	November 4, 1941	4th term	
206	Robert F. Rockwell	R	CO-04	December 9, 1941	4th term	Left the House in 1949.
207	Thomas J. Lane	D	MA-07	December 30, 1941	4th term	
208	Cecil R. King	D	CA-17	August 25, 1942	4th term	
209	Thomas Abernethy	D	MS-04	January 3, 1943	3rd term	
210	Samuel W. Arnold	R	MO-01	January 3, 1943	3rd term	Left the House in 1949.
211	James C. Auchincloss	R	NJ-03	January 3, 1943	3rd term	
212	Frank A. Barrett	R	WY	January 3, 1943	3rd term	
213	James Glenn Beall	R	MD-06	January 3, 1943	3rd term	
214	Walter E. Brehm	R	OH-11	January 3, 1943	3rd term	
215	Howard Buffett	R	NE-02	January 3, 1943	3rd term	Left the House in 1949.
216	Ralph E. Church	R	IL-10	January 3, 1943; Previous service, 1935–1941.	6th term*	
217	William Clay Cole	R	MO-03	January 3, 1943	3rd term	Left the House in 1949.
218	William L. Dawson	D	IL-01	January 3, 1943	3rd term	
219	Hubert S. Ellis	R	WV-04	January 3, 1943	3rd term	Left the House in 1949.
220	Harris Ellsworth	R	OR-04	January 3, 1943	3rd term	
221	Michael A. Feighan	D	OH-20	January 3, 1943	3rd term	
222	Antonio M. Fernández	D	NM	January 3, 1943	3rd term	
223	O. C. Fisher	D	TX-21	January 3, 1943	3rd term	
224	Leon H. Gavin	R	PA-19	January 3, 1943	3rd term	
225	Angier Goodwin	R	MA-08	January 3, 1943	3rd term	
226	Thomas S. Gordon	D	IL-08	January 3, 1943	3rd term	
227	Martin Gorski	D	IL-04	January 3, 1943	3rd term	
228	Percy W. Griffiths	R	OH-15	January 3, 1943	3rd term	Left the House in 1949.
229	Chester H. Gross	R	PA-21	January 3, 1943; Previous service, 1939–1941.	4th term*	Left the House in 1949.
230	Harold Hagen	R	MN-09	January 3, 1943	3rd term	
231	Robert Hale	R	ME-01	January 3, 1943	3rd term	
232	Richard F. Harless	D	AZ	January 3, 1943	3rd term	Left the House in 1949.
233	Brooks Hays	D	AR-05	January 3, 1943	3rd term	
234	Christian Herter	R	MA-10	January 3, 1943	3rd term	
235	Charles B. Hoeven	R	IA-08	January 3, 1943	3rd term	
236	Chester E. Holifield	D	CA-19	January 3, 1943	3rd term	
237	Hal Holmes	R	WA-04	January 3, 1943	3rd term	
238	Walt Horan	R	WA-05	January 3, 1943	3rd term	
239	Justin L. Johnson	R	CA-03	January 3, 1943	3rd term	
240	Walter Judd	R	MN-05	January 3, 1943	3rd term	
241	Bernard W. Kearney	R	NY-31	January 3, 1943	3rd term	
242	Henry D. Larcade Jr.	D	LA-07	January 3, 1943	3rd term	
243	Earl R. Lewis	R	OH-18	January 3, 1943; Previous service, 1939–1941.	4th term*	Left the House in 1949.
244	Jay Le Fevre	R	NY-30	January 3, 1943	3rd term	
245	William Lemke	R	ND	January 3, 1943; Previous service, 1933–1941.	7th term*	
246	Ray Madden	D	IN-01	January 3, 1943	3rd term	
247	Mike Mansfield	D	MT-01	January 3, 1943	3rd term	
248	Edward Oscar McCowen	R	OH-06	January 3, 1943	3rd term	Left the House in 1949.
249	Chester Earl Merrow	R	NH-01	January 3, 1943	3rd term	
250	Arthur L. Miller	R	NE-04	January 3, 1943	3rd term	
251	James H. Morrison	D	LA-06	January 3, 1943	3rd term	
252	Tom J. Murray	D	TN-08	January 3, 1943	3rd term	
253	Thomas J. O'Brien	D	IL-06	January 3, 1943; Previous service, 1933–1939.	6th term*	
254	Alvin O'Konski	R	WI-10	January 3, 1943	3rd term	
255	Philip J. Philbin	D	MA-03	January 3, 1943	3rd term	
256	John J. Phillips	R	CA-22	January 3, 1943	3rd term	
257	Emory H. Price	D	FL-02	January 3, 1943	3rd term	Left the House in 1949.
258	Homer A. Ramey	R	OH-09	January 3, 1943	3rd term	Left the House in 1949.
259	George G. Sadowski	D	MI-01	January 3, 1943; Previous service, 1933–1939.	6th term*	
260	Max Schwabe	R	MO-02	January 3, 1943	3rd term	Left the House in 1949.
261	Sid Simpson	R	IL-20	January 3, 1943	3rd term	
262	Lowell Stockman	R	OR-02	January 3, 1943	3rd term	
263	Frank Sundstrom	R	NJ-11	January 3, 1943	3rd term	Left the House in 1949.
264	Dean P. Taylor	R	NY-33	January 3, 1943	3rd term	
265	Harry Lancaster Towe	R	NJ-09	January 3, 1943	3rd term	
266	Charles W. Vursell	R	IL-23	January 3, 1943	3rd term	
267	Alvin F. Weichel	R	OH-13	January 3, 1943	3rd term	
268	W. Arthur Winstead	D	MS-05	January 3, 1943	3rd term	
269	Marion T. Bennett	R	MO-06	January 12, 1943	3rd term	Left the House in 1949.
270	Clair Engle	D	CA-02	August 31, 1943	3rd term	
271	Errett P. Scrivner	R	KS-02	September 14, 1943	3rd term	
272	Hadwen C. Fuller	R	NY-35	November 2, 1943	3rd term	Left the House in 1949.
273	Samuel K. McConnell Jr.	R	PA-16	January 18, 1944	3rd term	
274	George W. Andrews	D	AL-03	March 14, 1944	3rd term	
275	William G. Stigler	D	OK-02	March 28, 1944	3rd term	
276	Ellsworth B. Buck	R	NY-16	June 6, 1944	3rd term	Left the House in 1949.
277	John J. Rooney	D	NY-12	June 6, 1944	3rd term	
278	Rolla C. McMillen	R	IL-19	June 13, 1944	3rd term	
279	James R. Domengeaux	D	LA-03	November 7, 1944; Previous service, 1941–1944.	4th term*	Left the House in 1949.
280	John W. Byrnes	R	WI-08	January 3, 1945	2nd term	
281	Clifford P. Case	R	NJ-06	January 3, 1945	2nd term	
282	Frank Chelf	D	KY-04	January 3, 1945	2nd term	
283	Earle C. Clements	D	KY-02	January 3, 1945	2nd term	Resigned on January 6, 1948.
284	Albert M. Cole	R	KS-01	January 3, 1945	2nd term	
285	Jesse M. Combs	D	TX-02	January 3, 1945	2nd term	
286	Robert J. Corbett	R	PA-30	January 3, 1945; Previous service, 1939–1941.	3rd term*	
287	James I. Dolliver	R	IA-06	January 3, 1945	2nd term	
288	Helen Gahagan Douglas	D	CA-14	January 3, 1945	2nd term	
289	Edward J. Elsaesser	R	NY-43	January 3, 1945	2nd term	Left the House in 1949.
290	George Hyde Fallon	D	MD-04	January 3, 1945	2nd term	
291	James G. Fulton	R	PA-31	January 3, 1945	2nd term	
292	Albert A. Gore Sr.	D	TN-04	January 3, 1945; Previous service, 1939–1944.	5th term*	
293	Ralph W. Gwinn	R	NY-27	January 3, 1945	2nd term	
294	T. Millet Hand	R	NJ-02	January 3, 1945	2nd term	
295	Franck R. Havenner	P	CA-04	January 3, 1945; Previous service, 1937–1941.	4th term*	
296	E. H. Hedrick	D	WV-06	January 3, 1945	2nd term	
297	John W. Heselton	R	MA-01	January 3, 1945	2nd term	
298	Walter B. Huber	D	OH-14	January 3, 1945	2nd term	
299	Henry J. Latham	R	NY-03	January 3, 1945	2nd term	
300	John E. Lyle Jr.	D	TX-14	January 3, 1945	2nd term	
301	Gordon L. McDonough	R	CA-15	January 3, 1945	2nd term	
302	George Paul Miller	D	CA-06	January 3, 1945	2nd term	
303	Thomas E. Morgan	D	PA-24	January 3, 1945	2nd term	
304	Tom Pickett	D	TX-07	January 3, 1945	2nd term	
305	Adam Clayton Powell Jr.	D	NY-22	January 3, 1945	2nd term	
306	Charles Melvin Price	D	IL-22	January 3, 1945	2nd term	
307	Benjamin J. Rabin	D	NY-24	January 3, 1945	2nd term	Resigned on December 31, 1947.
308	Albert Rains	D	AL-05	January 3, 1945	2nd term	
309	Leo F. Rayfiel	D	NY-14	January 3, 1945	2nd term	Resigned on September 13, 1947.
310	Robert F. Rich	R	PA-15	January 3, 1945; Previous service, 1930–1943.	9th term*	
311	John J. Riley	D	SC-02	January 3, 1945	2nd term	Left the House in 1949.
312	Charles R. Robertson	R	ND	January 3, 1945; Previous service, 1941–1943.	3rd term*	Left the House in 1949.
313	Dwight L. Rogers	D	FL-06	January 3, 1945	2nd term	
314	George B. Schwabe	R	OK-01	January 3, 1945	2nd term	Left the House in 1949.
315	Robert L. F. Sikes	D	FL-03	January 3, 1945; Previous service, 1941–1944.	4th term*	
316	James William Trimble	D	AR-03	January 3, 1945	2nd term	
317	John Stephens Wood	D	GA-09	January 3, 1945; Previous service, 1931–1935.	4th term*	
318	John E. Fogarty	D	RI-02	February 7, 1945; Previous service, 1941–1944	4th term*	
319	J. Vaughan Gary	D	VA-03	March 6, 1945	2nd term	
320	Wesley A. D'Ewart	R	MT-02	June 5, 1945	2nd term	
321	Roy Clippinger	R	IL-24	November 6, 1945	2nd term	Left the House in 1949.
322	Frank A. Mathews Jr.	R	NJ-04	November 6, 1945	2nd term	Left the House in 1949.
323	A. Walter Norblad	R	OR-01	January 18, 1946	2nd term	
324	J. Lindsay Almond	D	VA-06	January 22, 1946	2nd term	Resigned on April 17, 1948.
325	Arthur G. Klein	D	NY-19	February 19, 1946; Previous service, 1941–1945.	3rd term*	
326	Frank Buchanan	D	PA-33	May 21, 1946	2nd term	
327	Olin E. Teague	D	TX-06	August 24, 1946	2nd term	
328	Burr Harrison	D	VA-07	November 5, 1946	2nd term	
329	James P. Scoblick	R	PA-10	November 5, 1946	2nd term	Left the House in 1949.
330	Thomas B. Stanley	D	VA-05	November 5, 1946	2nd term	
331	Carl Albert	D	OK-03	January 3, 1947	1st term	
332	John J. Allen Jr.	R	CA-07	January 3, 1947	1st term	
333	Claude I. Bakewell	R	MO-11	January 3, 1947	1st term	Left the House in 1949.
334	Parke M. Banta	R	MO-08	January 3, 1947	1st term	Left the House in 1949.
335	Laurie C. Battle	D	AL-09	January 3, 1947	1st term	
336	John B. Bennett	R	MI-12	January 3, 1947; Previous service, 1943–1945.	2nd term*	
337	John Blatnik	D	MN-08	January 3, 1947	1st term	
338	Hale Boggs	D	LA-02	January 3, 1947; Previous service, 1941–1943.	2nd term*	
339	J. Caleb Boggs	R	DE	January 3, 1947	1st term	
340	Willis W. Bradley	R	CA-18	January 3, 1947	1st term	Left the House in 1949.
341	Ernest K. Bramblett	R	CA-11	January 3, 1947	1st term	
342	John C. Brophy	R	WI-04	January 3, 1947	1st term	Left the House in 1949.
343	Horace Seely-Brown Jr.	R	CT-02	January 3, 1947	1st term	Left the House in 1949.
344	Raymond H. Burke	R	OH-03	January 3, 1947	1st term	Left the House in 1949.
345	Omar Burleson	D	TX-17	January 3, 1947	1st term	
346	Fred E. Busbey	R	IL-03	January 3, 1947; Previous service, 1943–1945.	2nd term*	Left the House in 1949.
347	John A. Carroll	D	CO-01	January 3, 1947	1st term	
348	Henderson H. Carson	R	OH-16	January 3, 1947; Previous service, 1943–1945.	2nd term*	Left the House in 1949.
349	E. Wallace Chadwick	R	PA-07	January 3, 1947	1st term	Left the House in 1949.
350	Howard A. Coffin	R	MI-13	January 3, 1947	1st term	Left the House in 1949.
351	Norris Cotton	R	NH-02	January 3, 1947	1st term	
352	Frederic René Coudert Jr.	R	NY-17	January 3, 1947	1st term	
353	William J. Crow	R	PA-23	January 3, 1947	1st term	Left the House in 1949.
354	Paul B. Dague	R	PA-09	January 3, 1947	1st term	
355	James C. Davis	D	GA-05	January 3, 1947	1st term	
356	William A. Dawson	R	UT-02	January 3, 1947	1st term	Left the House in 1949.
357	Charles B. Deane	D	NC-08	January 3, 1947	1st term	
358	Edward Devitt	R	MN-04	January 3, 1947	1st term	Left the House in 1949.
359	Harold Donohue	D	MA-04	January 3, 1947	1st term	
360	William Jennings Bryan Dorn	D	SC-03	January 3, 1947	1st term	Left the House in 1949.
361	Joe L. Evins	D	TN-05	January 3, 1947	1st term	
362	Charles K. Fletcher	R	CA-23	January 3, 1947	1st term	Left the House in 1949.
363	Ellsworth Foote	R	CT-03	January 3, 1947	1st term	Left the House in 1949.
364	James A. Gallagher	R	PA-01	January 3, 1947; Previous service, 1943–1945.	2nd term*	Left the House in 1949.
365	Katharine St. George	R	NY-29	January 3, 1947	1st term	
366	Abe Goff	R	ID-01	January 3, 1947	1st term	Left the House in 1949.
367	Porter Hardy Jr.	D	VA-02	January 3, 1947	1st term	
368	Donald L. Jackson	R	CA-16	January 3, 1947	1st term	
369	Jacob K. Javits	R	NY-21	January 3, 1947	1st term	
370	Edward H. Jenison	R	IL-18	January 3, 1947	1st term	
371	Mitchell Jenkins	R	PA-11	January 3, 1947	1st term	Left the House in 1949.
372	Glen D. Johnson	D	OK-04	January 3, 1947	1st term	Left the House in 1949.
373	Hamilton C. Jones	D	NC-10	January 3, 1947	1st term	
374	Homer Jones	R	WA-01	January 3, 1947	1st term	Left the House in 1949.
375	Frank M. Karsten	D	MO-13	January 3, 1947	1st term	
376	Carroll D. Kearns	R	PA-28	January 3, 1947	1st term	
377	Kenneth Keating	R	NY-40	January 3, 1947	1st term	
378	Charles J. Kersten	R	WI-05	January 3, 1947	1st term	Left the House in 1949.
379	John F. Kennedy	D	MA-11	January 3, 1947	1st term	
380	Henderson Lovelace Lanham	D	GA-07	January 3, 1947	1st term	
381	John Davis Lodge	R	CT-04	January 3, 1947	1st term	
382	Francis J. Love	R	WV-01	January 3, 1947	1st term	Left the House in 1949.
383	Wingate H. Lucas	D	TX-12	January 3, 1947	1st term	
384	Georgia Lee Lusk	D	NM	January 3, 1947	1st term	Left the House in 1949.
385	George MacKinnon	R	MN-03	January 3, 1947	1st term	Left the House in 1949.
386	W. Kingsland Macy	R	NY-01	January 3, 1947	1st term	
387	Franklin J. Maloney	R	PA-04	January 3, 1947	1st term	Left the House in 1949.
388	John McDowell	R	PA-29	January 3, 1947; Previous service, 1939–1941.	2nd term*	Left the House in 1949.
389	Robert N. McGarvey	R	PA-02	January 3, 1947	1st term	Left the House in 1949.
390	Gregory McMahon	R	NY-04	January 3, 1947	1st term	Left the House in 1949.
391	Hugh Meade	D	MD-02	January 3, 1947	1st term	Left the House in 1949.
392	Wendell H. Meade	R	KY-07	January 3, 1947	1st term	Left the House in 1949.
393	Herbert Alton Meyer	R	KS-03	January 3, 1947	1st term	
394	Edward T. Miller	R	MD-01	January 3, 1947	1st term	
395	William J. Miller	R	CT-01	January 3, 1947; Previous service, 1939–1941 and 1943–1945.	3rd term**	Left the House in 1949.
396	E. A. Mitchell	R	IN-08	January 3, 1947	1st term	Left the House in 1949.
397	Toby Morris	D	OK-06	January 3, 1947	1st term	
398	Thurston Ballard Morton	R	KY-03	January 3, 1947	1st term	
399	Frederick Augustus Muhlenberg	R	PA-13	January 3, 1947	1st term	Left the House in 1949.
400	Richard Nixon	R	CA-12	January 3, 1947	1st term	
401	Robert Nodar Jr.	R	NY-06	January 3, 1947	1st term	Left the House in 1949.
402	Fred B. Norman	R	WA-03	January 3, 1947; Previous service, 1943–1945.	2nd term*	Died on April 18, 1947.
403	Thomas L. Owens	R	IL-07	January 3, 1947	1st term	Died on June 7, 1948.
404	Otto Passman	D	LA-05	January 3, 1947	1st term	
405	James T. Patterson	R	CT-05	January 3, 1947	1st term	
406	Preston E. Peden	D	OK-07	January 3, 1947	1st term	Left the House in 1949.
407	Dayton E. Phillips	R	TN-01	January 3, 1947	1st term	
408	David M. Potts	R	NY-26	January 3, 1947	1st term	Left the House in 1949.
409	Norris Poulson	R	CA-13	January 3, 1947; Previous service, 1943–1945.	2nd term*	
410	Prince Hulon Preston Jr.	D	GA-01	January 3, 1947	1st term	
411	Monroe Minor Redden	D	NC-12	January 3, 1947	1st term	
412	Albert L. Reeves Jr.	R	MO-05	January 3, 1947	1st term	Left the House in 1949.
413	R. Walter Riehlman	R	NY-36	January 3, 1947	1st term	
414	Edward G. Rohrbough	R	WV-03	January 3, 1947; Previous service, 1943–1945.	2nd term*	Left the House in 1949.
415	Robert Tripp Ross	R	NY-05	January 3, 1947	1st term	Left the House in 1949.
416	Charles H. Russell	R	NV	January 3, 1947	1st term	Left the House in 1949.
417	Antoni Sadlak	R	CT	January 3, 1947	1st term	
418	John C. Sanborn	R	ID-02	January 3, 1947	1st term	
419	George W. Sarbacher Jr.	R	PA-05	January 3, 1947	1st term	Left the House in 1949.
420	Hardie Scott	R	PA-03	January 3, 1947	1st term	
421	Hugh Scott	R	PA-06	January 3, 1947; Previous service, 1941–1945.	3rd term*	
422	George Smathers	D	FL-04	January 3, 1947	1st term	
423	Wint Smith	R	KS-06	January 3, 1947	1st term	
424	Melvin C. Snyder	R	WV-02	January 3, 1947	1st term	Left the House in 1949.
425	William Stratton	R	IL	January 3, 1947; Previous service, 1941–1943.	2nd term*	Left the House in 1949.
426	Thor C. Tollefson	R	WA-06	January 3, 1947	1st term	
427	Robert Twyman	R	IL-09	January 3, 1947	1st term	Left the House in 1949.
428	Richard B. Vail	R	IL-02	January 3, 1947	1st term	Left the House in 1949.
429	William M. Wheeler	D	GA-08	January 3, 1947	1st term	
430	John Bell Williams	D	MS-07	January 3, 1947	1st term	
431	Joseph Franklin Wilson	D	TX-05	January 3, 1947	1st term	
432	Harold F. Youngblood	R	MI-14	January 3, 1947	1st term	Left the House in 1949.
433	James E. Van Zandt	R	PA-22	January 3, 1947; Previous service, 1939–1943.	4th term*	
	Robert E. Jones Jr.	D	AL-08	January 28, 1947	1st term	
	Glenn Robert Davis	R	WI-02	April 22, 1947	1st term	
	Russell V. Mack	R	WA-03	July 7, 1947	1st term	
	Edward Garmatz	D	MD-03	July 15, 1947	1st term	
	Kenneth M. Regan	D	TX-16	August 23, 1947	1st term	
	Clark W. Thompson	D	TX-09	August 23, 1947; Previous service, 1933–1935.	2nd term*	
	Charles E. Potter	R	MI-11	August 26, 1947	1st term	
	Franklin H. Lichtenwalter	R	PA-08	September 9, 1947	1st term	
	Ralph Harvey	R	IN-10	November 4, 1947	1st term	
	William Moore McCulloch	R	OH-04	November 4, 1947	1st term	
	Abraham J. Multer	D	NY-14	November 4, 1947	1st term	
	Donald W. Nicholson	R	MA-09	November 18, 1947	1st term	
	Watkins Moorman Abbitt	D	VA-04	February 17, 1948	1st term	
	Leo Isacson	D	NY-24	February 17, 1948	1st term	Left the House in 1949.
	John A. Whitaker	D	KY-02	April 17, 1948	1st term	
	William Lewis	R	KY-09	April 24, 1948	1st term	Left the House in 1949.
	Clarence G. Burton	D	VA-06	November 2, 1948	1st term	
	Paul C. Jones	D	MO-10	November 2, 1948	1st term	
	Lloyd Bentsen	D	TX-15	December 4, 1948	1st term	

== Delegates ==
Rank	Delegate	Party	District	Seniority date (Previous service, if any)	No.# of term(s)	Notes
1	Joseph Rider Farrington	R	HI	January 3, 1943	3rd term	
2	Bob Bartlett	D	AK	January 3, 1945	2nd term	
3	Antonio Fernós-Isern	D	PR	September 11, 1946	2nd term	

== See also ==
- 80th United States Congress
- List of United States congressional districts
- List of United States senators in the 80th Congress
