= 1952 Arizona gubernatorial election =

- November 4, 1952
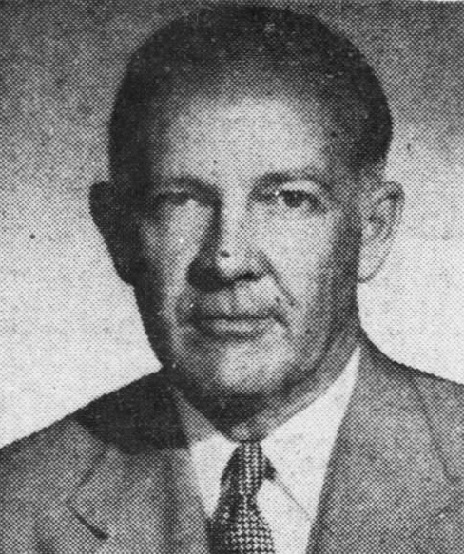
Nominee	John Howard Pyle	Joe C. Haldiman
Party	Republican	Democratic
Popular vote	156,592	103,693
Percentage	60.16%	39.84%
- County results Pyle: 50–60% 60–70% Haldiman: 50–60% 60–70%
Governor before election
John Howard Pyle
Republican
Elected Governor
John Howard Pyle
Republican

The 1952 Arizona gubernatorial election took place on November 4, 1952. Incumbent Governor John Howard Pyle, the first Republican elected to the office in two decades, ran for reelection to a second term.

John Howard Pyle defeated Democratic nominee Joe C. Haldiman by a wide margin, becoming only the second Republican to be reelected to a consecutive term as Governor of Arizona in the state's history.

== Republican primary ==
=== Candidates ===
- John Howard Pyle, incumbent Governor

== Democratic primary ==
=== Candidates ===
- Joe C. Haldiman, State Senator
- Sam J. Head, Yavapai County Attorney

=== Results ===
Democratic primary results
Party	Candidate	Votes	%
Democratic	Joe C. Haldiman	62,388	52.29%
Democratic	Sam J. Head	56,922	47.71%
Total votes		119,310	100.00%

== General election ==
=== Results ===
Arizona gubernatorial election, 1952
Party	Candidate	Votes	%	±%
Republican	John Howard Pyle (incumbent)	156,592	60.16%	+9.40%
Democratic	Joe C. Haldiman	103,693	39.84%	−9.40%
Majority		52,899	20.32%	
Total votes		260,285	100.00%	
Republican hold		Swing	+18.79%	

=== Results by county ===
County	John Howard Pyle Republican		Joe C. Haldiman Democratic		Margin		Total votes cast
County	#	%	#	%	#	%	Total votes cast
Apache	1,737	58.52%	1,231	41.48%	506	17.05%	2,968
Cochise	6,380	52.64%	5,739	47.36%	641	5.29%	12,119
Coconino	4,015	64.52%	2,208	35.48%	1,807	29.04%	6,223
Gila	3,715	42.39%	5,048	57.61%	-1,333	-15.21%	8,763
Graham	2,307	52.18%	2,114	47.82%	193	4.37%	4,421
Greenlee	1,376	31.62%	2,976	68.38%	-1,600	-36.76%	4,352
Maricopa	79,216	62.09%	48,362	37.91%	30,854	24.18%	127,578
Mohave	1,509	53.93%	1,289	46.07%	220	7.86%	2,798
Navajo	3,585	58.86%	2,506	41.14%	1,079	17.71%	6,091
Pima	34,232	64.79%	18,603	35.21%	15,629	29.58%	52,835
Pinal	5,255	55.12%	4,278	44.88%	977	10.25%	9,533
Santa Cruz	1,791	57.79%	1,308	42.21%	483	15.59%	3,099
Yavapai	6,253	60.60%	4,065	39.40%	2,188	21.21%	10,318
Yuma	5,221	56.83%	3,966	43.17%	1,255	13.66%	9,187
Totals	156,592	60.16%	103,693	39.84%	52,899	20.32%	260,285

==== Counties that flipped from Democratic to Republican ====
- Apache
- Cochise
- Graham
- Mohave
- Pinal
- Santa Cruz
