= Mary Rose Wilcox =

American politician

Member-elect of the Arizona House of Representatives from the 14th district
- Assuming office January 2027
- Succeeding: Laurin Hendrix

Personal details
- Party: Democratic
- Relations: Ana Frohmiller (great-niece)
- Education: Ottawa University
- Website: Campaign website

Mary Rose Wilcox is an American politician. A member of the Democratic Party, she is the member-elect for the 14th district of the Arizona House of Representatives. She was elected in the 2026 election.

== Biography ==
Wilcox is the great-niece of the politician Ana Frohmiller. She was born in Superior, Arizona. In August 1997, Maricopa County Supervisor Wilcox was shot and injured while leaving a county board meeting by Larry Naman, a homeless man, who attempted to argue in court that her support for the tax justified his attack. In May 1998, Naman was found guilty of attempted first-degree murder. Wilcox was the first Hispanic woman elected to Phoenix City Council. In 2014, she was a candidate for Arizona's 7th congressional district.

== See also ==
- List of representatives and senators of the Arizona Legislature by district, 2023–2033
