= Wiley E. Jones =

American politician (1856–1924)

2nd Arizona Attorney General
- In office December 7, 1914 – 1921
- Governor: Thomas E. Campbell
- Preceded by: George Purdy Bullard
- Succeeded by: W. J. Galbraith

County Attorney of Graham County
- In office 1893–1901
- Succeeded by: Lee Stratton

Personal details
- Born: October 19, 1856 Sangamon County, Illinois, US
- Died: January 23, 1924 (aged 67) Phoenix, Arizona, US
- Party: Democratic
- Profession: Attorney

Wiley E. Jones (October 19, 1856 – January 23, 1924) was an American lawyer and Democratic Party politician. Jones was the second Attorney General of Arizona after it gained statehood.

== Life and career ==
Jones was born in 1865 in Sangamon County, Illinois. His parents were Joshua W. and Polly A. Wills Jones, from Kentucky. Jones received his education in Illinois and studied law for four years with General John M. Palmer.

Jones practiced in Springfield, Illinois and was elected to the Illinois House of Representatives in 1886 and was chosen as speaker of the house. He was re-elected in 1888, but was defeated in his election for speaker. Jones moved to Arizona in April 1892. He served as the District Attorney of Graham County. First elected in 1892, he served until defeated in a disputed election in 1900.

In 1898, he was appointed as an officer in the Rough Riders, but his duties as District Attorney compelled him to decline the appointment. He did however, enlisted as a lieutenant in the 1st Territorial Volunteer Infantry.

Jones served as one of Arizona's three democratic electors in the 1912 United States Presidential Election.

Governor Hunt appointed Jones Attorney General on December 7, 1914, to fill the vacancy caused by the resignation of Attorney General George P. Ballard. Jones was elected to the position in 1915 and won two re-elections until he was defeated in 1920 by W. J. Galbraith.

== Trivia ==
In May 1921, Jones stayed at the Jones Hotel in Safford on a Friday evening. During the evening he wanted to impress some women there. For this he took a gila monster out of a box that he had with him. He held the reptile by the neck with his right hand and pat the head of the reptile with his left hand. Soon after, the gila monster had bitten into the end of his middle finger on the left hand. It took more than a minute for the reptile to release his hand. As a result of the bite, Jones' hand and tongue swelled. It took about five hours for the swelling in his tongue to reduce enough to speak again.

== Death ==
In 1924, Jones was fatally injured when he was struck by an automobile while riding his bicycle. He died four days later.

He is buried at the Greenwood Memory Lawn Cemetery in Phoenix.
