= List of United States senators in the 80th Congress =

This is a complete list of United States senators during the 80th United States Congress listed by seniority from January 3, 1947, to January 3, 1949.

Order of service is based on the commencement of the senator's first term. Behind this is former service as a senator (only giving the senator seniority within their new incoming class), service as vice president, a House member, a cabinet secretary, or a governor of a state. The final factor is the population of the senator's state.

Senators who were sworn in during the middle of the two-year congressional term (up until the last senator who was not sworn in early after winning the November 1948 election) are listed at the end of the list with no number.

In this congress, Richard Russell Jr. was the most senior junior senator and Leverett Saltonstall was the junior senior senator.

== Terms of service ==
Class	Terms of service of senators that expired in years
Class 2	Terms of service of senators that expired in 1949 (AL, AR, CO, DE, GA, IA, ID, IL, KS, KY, LA, MA, ME, MI, MN, MS, MT, NC, NE, NH, NJ, NM, OK, OR, RI, SC, SD, TN, TX, VA, WV, and WY.)
Class 3	Terms of service of senators that expired in 1951 (AL, AR, AZ, CA, CO, CT, FL, GA, ID, IL, IN, IA, KS, KY, LA, MD, MO, NC, ND, NH, NV, NY, OH, OK, OR, PA, SC, SD, UT, VT, WA, and WI.)
Class 1	Terms of service of senators that expired in 1953 (AZ, CA, CT, DE, FL, IN, MA, MD, ME, MI, MN, MO, MS, MT, ND, NE, NJ, NM, NV, NY, OH, PA, RI, TN, TX, UT, VA, VT, WA, WI, WV, and WY.)

== U.S. Senate seniority list ==
U.S. Senate seniority
Rank	Senator (party-state)	Seniority date	Other factors
1	Kenneth McKellar (D-TN)	March 4, 1917	
2	Arthur Capper (R-KS)	March 4, 1919	
3	Walter F. George (D-GA)	November 22, 1922	
4	Carl Hayden (D-AZ)	March 4, 1927	Former representative (15 years)
5	Alben W. Barkley (D-KY)	March 4, 1927	Former representative (14 years)
6	Elmer Thomas (D-OK)	March 4, 1927	Former representative (4 years), Oklahoma 21st in population (1920)
7	Millard Tydings (D-MD)	March 4, 1927	Former representative (4 years), Maryland 28th in population (1920)
8	Robert F. Wagner (D-NY)	March 4, 1927	
9	Arthur H. Vandenberg (R-MI)	March 31, 1928	
10	Tom Connally (D-TX)	March 4, 1929	
11	Wallace H. White Jr. (R-ME)	March 4, 1931	
12	Richard Russell Jr. (D-GA)	January 12, 1933	
13	John H. Overton (D-LA)	March 4, 1933	Former representative
14	Harry F. Byrd Sr. (D-VA)	March 4, 1933	Former governor
15	Elbert D. Thomas (D-UT)	March 4, 1933	Utah 40th in population (1930)
16	Pat McCarran (D-NV)	March 4, 1933	Nevada 48th in population (1930)
17	Carl Hatch (D-NM)	October 10, 1933	
18	Joseph C. O'Mahoney (D-WY)	January 1, 1934	
19	James Murray (D-MT)	November 7, 1934	
20	Theodore G. Bilbo (D-MS)	January 3, 1935	
21	Dennis Chavez (D-NM)	May 11, 1935	
22	Claude Pepper (D-FL)	November 4, 1936	
23	Edwin C. Johnson (D-CO)	January 3, 1937	Former governor, Colorado 33rd in population (1930)
24	Theodore F. Green (D-RI)	January 3, 1937	Former governor, Rhode Island 37th in population (1930)
25	Styles Bridges (R-NH)	January 3, 1937	Former governor, New Hampshire 41st in population (1930)
26	Allen J. Ellender (D-LA)	January 3, 1937	
27	Joseph L. Hill (D-AL)	January 11, 1938	
28	Tom Stewart (D-TN)	November 9, 1938	
29	Scott W. Lucas (D-IL)	January 3, 1939	Former representative (4 years)
30	Charles W. Tobey (R-NH)	January 3, 1939	Former representative (2 years)
31	Clyde M. Reed (R-KS)	January 3, 1939	Former governor
32	Robert A. Taft (R-OH)	January 3, 1939	Ohio 4th in population (1930)
33	Sheridan Downey (D-CA)	January 3, 1939	California 6th in population
34	Alexander Wiley (R-WI)	January 3, 1939	Wisconsin 13th in population (1930)
35	John Chandler Gurney (R-SD)	January 3, 1939	South Dakota 36th in population (1930)
36	C. Wayland Brooks (R-IL)	November 22, 1940	
37	Ralph Owen Brewster (R-ME)	January 3, 1941	Former governor, Maine 35th in population (1940)
38	William Langer (R-ND)	January 3, 1941	Former governor, North Dakota 38th in population (1940)
39	Harley M. Kilgore (D-WV)	January 3, 1941	West Virginia 27th in population (1930)
40	Hugh A. Butler (R-NE)	January 3, 1941	Nebraska 32nd in population (1930)
41	Ernest McFarland (D-AZ)	January 3, 1941	Arizona 43rd in population (1930)
42	George Aiken (R-VT)	January 10, 1941	
43	W. Lee O'Daniel (D-TX)	August 4, 1941	
44	Burnet R. Maybank (D-SC)	November 5, 1941	
45	Eugene D. Millikin (R-CO)	December 20, 1941	
46	Joseph H. Ball (R-MN)	January 3, 1943	Previously a senator (2 years)
47	James Eastland (D-MS)	January 3, 1943	Previously a senator (1 year)
48	John Little McClellan (D-AR)	January 3, 1943	Former representative
49	Harlan J. Bushfield (R-SD)	January 3, 1943	Former governor, South Dakota 37th in population (1940)
50	C. Douglass Buck (R-DE)	January 3, 1943	Former governor, Delaware 47th in population (1940)
51	Homer S. Ferguson (R-MI)	January 3, 1943	Michigan 7th in population (1940)
52	Albert W. Hawkes (R-NJ)	January 3, 1943	New Jersey 9th in population (1940)
53	Edward H. Moore (R-OK)	January 3, 1943	Oklahoma 22nd in population (1940)
54	W. Chapman Revercomb (R-WV)	January 3, 1943	West Virginia 24th in population (1940)
55	Kenneth S. Wherry (R-NE)	January 3, 1943	Nebraska 32nd in population (1940)
56	Edward V. Robertson (R-WY)	January 3, 1943	Wyoming 46th in population (1940)
57	George A. Wilson (R-IA)	January 14, 1943	
58	Guy Cordon (R-OR)	March 4, 1944	
59	Howard A. Smith (R-NJ)	December 7, 1944	
60	Warren G. Magnuson (D-WA)	December 14, 1944	
61	Francis J. Myers (D-PA)	January 3, 1945	Former representative (6 years)
62	J. William Fulbright (D-AR)	January 3, 1945	Former representative (2 years)
64	Clyde R. Hoey (D-NC)	January 3, 1945	Former representative (1 year, 2 months)
63	Forrest C. Donnell (R-MO)	January 3, 1945	Former governor, Missouri 10th in population (1940)
65	Bourke B. Hickenlooper (R-IA)	January 3, 1945	Former governor, Iowa 20th in population (1940)
66	Olin D. Johnston (D-SC)	January 3, 1945	Former governor, South Carolina 26th in population (1940)
67	Homer E. Capehart (R-IN)	January 3, 1945	Indiana 12th in population (1940)
68	Brien McMahon (D-CT)	January 3, 1945	Connecticut 31st in population (1940)
69	Wayne Morse (R-OR)	January 3, 1945	Oregon 34th in population (1940)
70	Glen H. Taylor (D-ID)	January 3, 1945	Idaho 42nd in population (1940)
71	Leverett Saltonstall (R-MA)	January 4, 1945	
72	Milton Young (R-ND)	March 12, 1945	
73	William F. Knowland (R-CA)	August 26, 1945	
74	Spessard Holland (D-FL)	September 24, 1946	
75	Ralph Flanders (R-VT)	November 1, 1946	
76	A. Willis Robertson (D-VA)	November 6, 1946	Former representative (13 years, 10 months)
77	John Sparkman (D-AL)	November 6, 1946	Former representative (9 years, 10 months)
78	Henry Dworshak (R-ID)	November 6, 1946	Former representative (8 years)
79	John Sherman Cooper (R-KY)	November 6, 1946	
80	William B. Umstead (D-NC)	December 18, 1946	
81	Harry P. Cain (R-WA)	December 26, 1946	
82	Raymond E. Baldwin (R-CT)	December 27, 1946	
83	Henry Cabot Lodge Jr. (R-MA)	January 3, 1947	Previously a senator (7 years, 1 month)
84	William E. Jenner (R-IN)	January 3, 1947	Previously a senator (2 months)
85	Edward Martin (R-PA)	January 3, 1947	Former governor, Pennsylvania 2nd in population (1940)
86	John W. Bricker (R-OH)	January 3, 1947	Former governor, Ohio 4th in population (1940)
87	Edward John Thye (R-MN)	January 3, 1947	Former governor, Minnesota 18th in population (1940)
88	Herbert O'Conor (D-MD)	January 3, 1947	Former governor, Maryland 28th in population (1940)
89	Irving Ives (R-NY)	January 3, 1947	New York 1st in population (1940)
90	James P. Kem (R-MO)	January 3, 1947	Missouri 10th in population (1940)
91	Joseph McCarthy (R-WI)	January 3, 1947	Wisconsin 13th in population (1940)
92	J. Howard McGrath (R-RI)	January 3, 1947	Rhode Island 36th in population (1940)
93	Zales Ecton (R-MT)	January 3, 1947	Montana 39th in population (1940)
94	Arthur Vivian Watkins (R-UT)	January 3, 1947	Utah 40th in population (1940)
95	John J. Williams (R-DE)	January 3, 1947	Delaware 47th in population (1940)
96	George W. Malone (R-NV)	January 3, 1947	Nevada 48th in population (1940)
—	John C. Stennis (D-MS)	November 17, 1947	
—	William C. Feazel (D-LA)	May 18, 1948	
—	Vera C. Bushfield (R-SD)	October 6, 1948	
—	Karl Mundt (R-SD)	December 31, 1948	Former representative
—	J. Melville Broughton (D-NC)	December 31, 1948	Former governor
—	Russell B. Long (D-LA)	December 31, 1948	

The most senior senators by class were Kenneth McKellar (D-Tennessee) from Class 1, Arthur Capper (R-Kansas) from Class 2, and Walter F. George (D-Georgia) from Class 3.

== See also ==
- 80th United States Congress
- List of United States representatives in the 80th Congress
