= W. J. Galbraith =

American lawyer and Republican politician (1872–1956)

3rd Arizona Attorney General
- In office 1921–1923
- Governor: Thomas E. Campbell
- Preceded by: Wiley E. Jones
- Succeeded by: John W. Murphy

Member of the Arizona House of Representatives
- In office 1919–1920
- Constituency: Maricopa County

Personal details
- Born: 1872 Susquehanna County, Pennsylvania
- Died: December 21, 1956 (aged 83–84) Sparta, Missouri
- Party: Republican
- Profession: Attorney

William James Galbraith (1872 – December 21, 1956) was an American lawyer and Republican politician. Galbraith was the third Attorney General of Arizona after it gained statehood.

== Life and career ==
Galbraith was born in 1872 in Susquehanna county, Pennsylvania, and moved to Arizona in 1901 and settled in Cochise County. He graduated from Stanford University and from the University of Chicago and was admitted to practice law in Arizona in 1909.

From 1909 to 1913 Galbraith lived in Tucson, taught law at the University of Arizona and was an assistant attorney general. While in Tucson he served as a scoutmaster for the first Boy Scout troop in Tucson.

He later moved to Maricopa County and served as a member of the Fourth Legislature of Arizona and was a member of the Uniform Law Commission of Arizona for two terms. He was elected Arizona Attorney General in 1920. In 1924, he was the Republican nominee for Arizona's only congressional district, but lost to Democrat Carl Hayden.
