= J. Howard Pyle =

American politician; 9th Governor of Arizona (1951–1955)

Howard Pyle
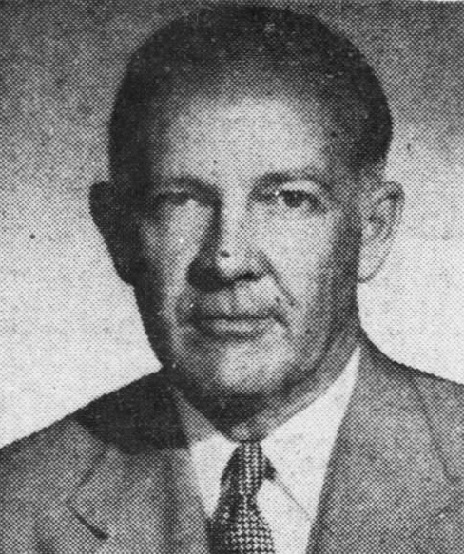
- Pyle in a 1954 campaign advertisement

9th Governor of Arizona
- In office January 1, 1951 – January 3, 1955
- Preceded by: Dan Edward Garvey
- Succeeded by: Ernest McFarland

Personal details
- Born: John Howard Pyle; March 25, 1906 Sheridan, Wyoming, U.S.
- Died: November 29, 1987 (aged 81) Tempe, Arizona, U.S.
- Party: Republican
- Spouse: Lucile Hanna
- Education: Arizona State University, Tempe (BA)

John Howard Pyle (March 25, 1906 – November 29, 1987) was an American broadcaster and politician who served as the ninth governor of the U.S. state of Arizona from 1951 to 1955. An opponent of polygamy, he authorized a raid on a Fundamentalist Church of Jesus Christ of Latter Day Saints compound. As a member of the Republican Party, Pyle also served as an official in the administration of President Dwight D. Eisenhower.

Pyle graduated from Arizona State University in 1930 and was a member of Lambda Chi Alpha fraternity. He was a program director for a radio station and served as a war correspondent during World War II. He was the first Governor of Arizona who was born in the 20th century.

== Biography ==
Born in 1906 in Sheridan, Wyoming, Pyle was the first governor of Arizona to be born in the 20th century and was the Program Director of KFAD (now KTAR) Radio in Phoenix from 1930 to 1951. He also served as a war correspondent during World War II and covered the surrender ceremony of the Japanese. Pyle defeated pioneering female politician Ana Frohmiller in his 1950 campaign for governor. He served as Governor of Arizona from 1951 to 1955.

In 1953, he attempted to break up a polygamous fundamentalist Mormon compound in Colorado City, Arizona, in what became known as the Short Creek Raid, which resulted in two dozen men arrested and 236 children placed in foster homes. This move alienated many voters in the state after photographs of tearful children being forcibly removed from their distraught mothers appeared in the newspapers. Later citing the negative reaction by the voters to the Short Creek raid as the cause, Pyle subsequently lost his 1954 re-election bid for a third term to his Democratic opponent, former Senate Majority Leader Ernest McFarland, and left office in January 1955.

After his governorship ended, Pyle joined the presidency of Dwight D. Eisenhower, appointed as director of the newly created Office of the Deputy Assistant to the President for Intergovernmental Relations on February 1, 1955. When president Dwight D. Eisenhower created a Joint Federal–State Action Committee on July 20, 1957, to address traffic safety, he appointed Pyle as one of the seven committee members, and Pyle spoke as a representative of the president at regional conferences on highway safety held in 1958. In 1959, he became president of the National Safety Council (NSC). Walter F. Carey, chair of the NSC's board of directors, called Pyle an "ideal successor to Ned H. Dearborn", Pyle's predecessor as NSC president.

The University of Redlands, Chapman University, Arizona State University, Lebanon College and Bradley University awarded honorary LL.D degrees to Pyle.

== Later life ==
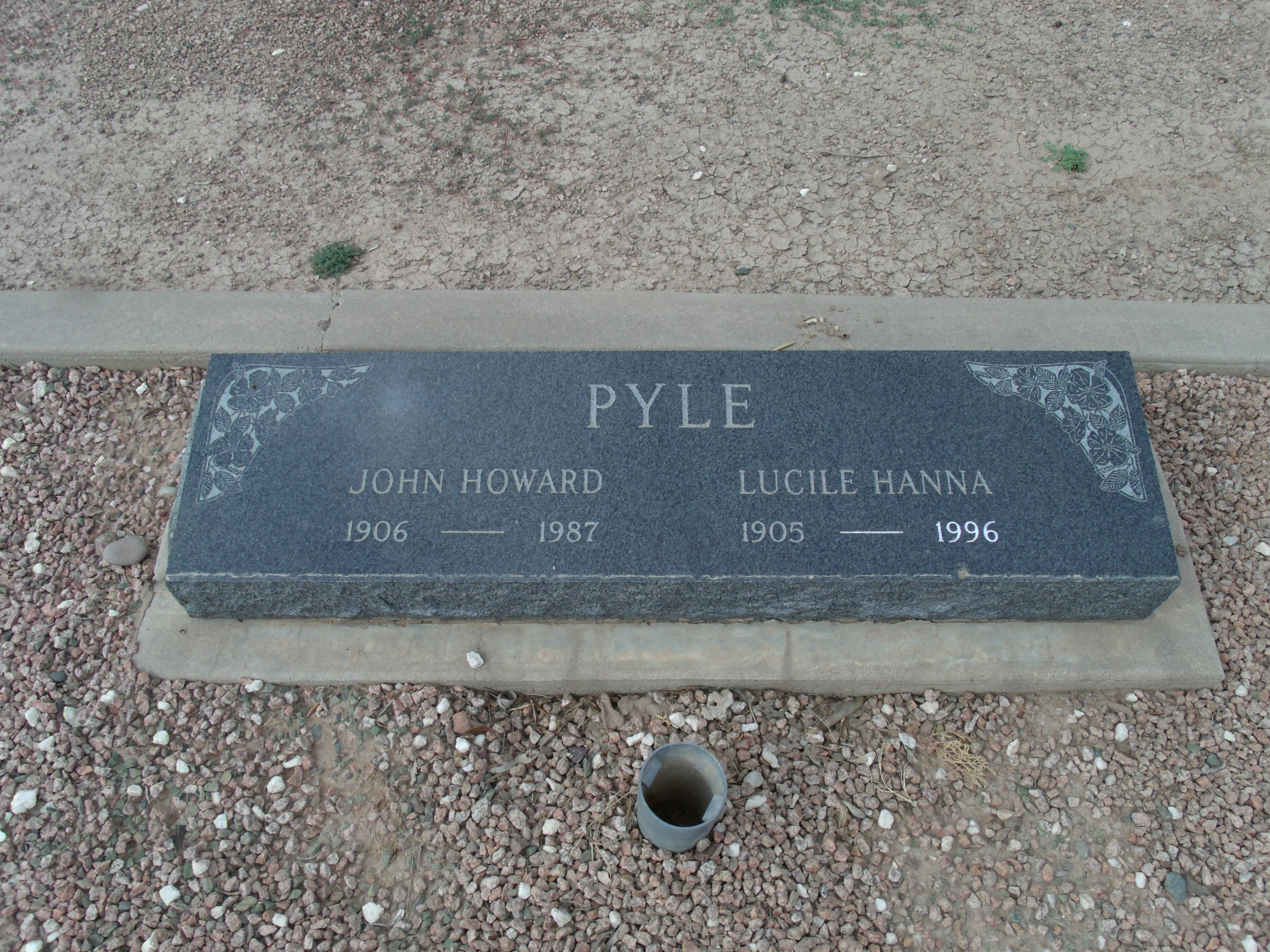
J. Howard Pyle's grave at Double Butte Cemetery in Tempe

The NSC elected Vincent L. Tofany as its new president on October 29, 1973, ending Pyle's tenure. Pyle retired and moved to Tempe, where he wrote columns for the Tempe Daily News-Tribune. After having a stroke, he was hospitalized on October 23, 1987. Pyle died on November 29, 1987, in Tempe, Arizona, survived by his wife, Lucile Hanna Pyle, and two daughters. Pyle's home, abandoned after his death, was later refurbished and preserved as a historic property called the Pyle House.

== Bibliography ==
=== Books ===
- Bradley, Martha Sonntag (1993). Kidnapped from that Land: The Government Raids on the Short Creek Polygamists. University of Utah Press. ISBN 0-87480-528-7.
- Critchlow, Donald T. (2018). Republican Character: From Nixon to Reagan. Haney Foundation Series. University of Pennsylvania Press. ISBN 978-0-8122-4977-4.
- Shermer, Elizabeth Tandy (2013). Sunbelt Capitalism: Phoenix and the Transformation of American Politics. Politics and Culture in Modern America. University of Pennsylvania Press. ISBN 978-0-8122-4470-0.
- Weingroff, Richard F. (2003). "Maintaining the Focus". President Dwight D. Eisenhower and the Federal Role in Highway Safety. With the assistance of Sonquela Seabron. Federal Highway Administration.
- Weingroff, Richard F. (2003b). "Epilogue: The Changing Federal Role". President Dwight D. Eisenhower and the Federal Role in Highway Safety. With the assistance of Sonquela Seabron. Federal Highway Administration.

=== Journals ===
- Patterson, Bradley H., Jr. (Spring 1994). "Teams and Staff: Dwight Eisenhower's Innovations in the Structure and Operations of the Modern White House". Presidential Studies Quarterly. 24 (2): 277–298. JSTOR 27551241.
- Smith, Thomas G. (Autumn 2012). "Worshipping at the Grand Canyon: The Shrine of the Ages Chapel Controversy". Journal of Arizona History. 53 (3): 221–252. JSTOR 41697526.
- Stever, James A. (Winter 1993). "The Growth and Decline of Executive-centered Intergovernmental Management". Publius: The Journal of Federalism. 23 (1): 71–84. JSTOR 3330800.

=== Newspapers and magazines ===
- "J. Howard Pyle Dead; Ex-Arizona Governor". The New York Times. December 1, 1987.
- Murr, Andrew (May 12, 2008). "Look Past Polygamy". Newsweek. Vol. 151, no. 19. p. 42.
- "New Safety Head to Widen Goals". Notes on People. The New York Times. October 30, 1973. p. 49.

=== Other ===
- "Arizona Centennial Series: 10 Historic Buildings Still Standing". AZ Big Media. August 1, 2011.
- "Arizona Gov. John Howard Pyle". National Governors Association. January 7, 2019.
- "Biographical Note". Prepared for the Arizona State Library, Phoenix, Arizona.
- "Governor Howard J. Pyle House". Facility Directory Formatted List. City of Tempe.

Party political offices
Preceded by Bruce Brockett	Republican nominee for Governor of Arizona; 1950, 1952, 1954	Succeeded by Horace B. Griffen
Political offices
Preceded by Dan Edward Garvey	Governor of Arizona; 1951–1955	Succeeded by Ernest W. McFarland
