= George Purdy Bullard =

American lawyer and politician

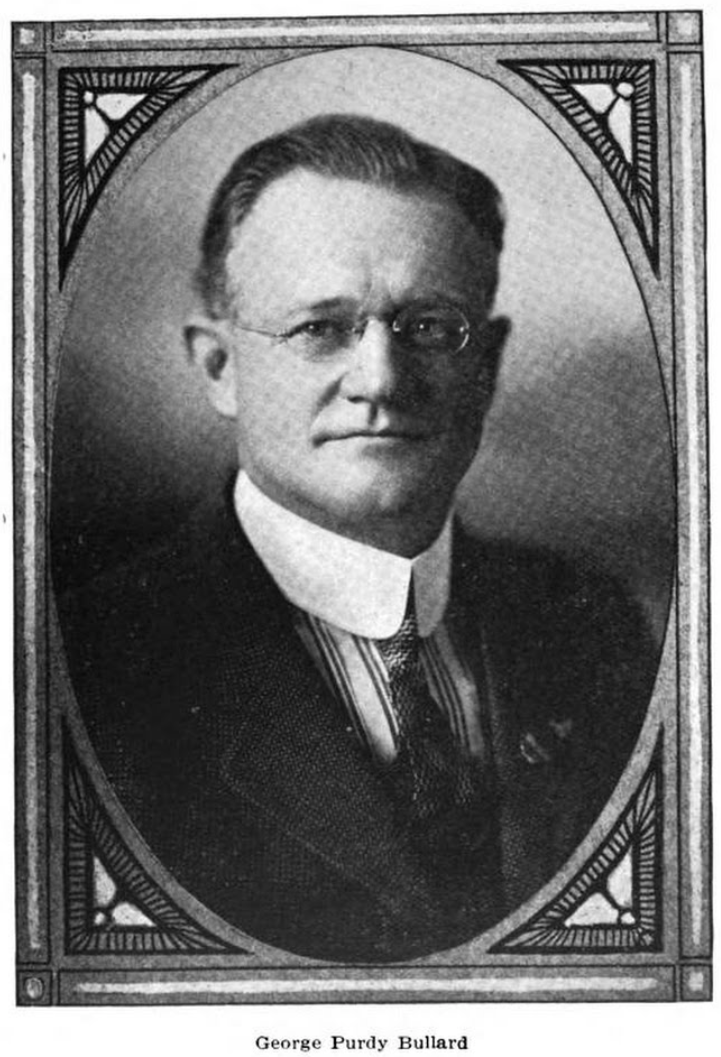

1st Arizona Attorney General
- In office 1912–1915
- Governor: George W. P. Hunt
- Succeeded by: Wiley E. Jones

Personal details
- Born: April 14, 1869; Portland, Oregon
- Died: July 25, 1924 (aged 55); Phoenix, Arizona
- Political party: Democratic
- Spouse: Pearl McHenry
- Profession: Attorney

George Purdy Bullard (April 14, 1869 – July 25, 1924) was an American lawyer and Democratic Party politician. Bullard was the first Attorney General of Arizona after it gained statehood.

== Life and career ==
George Purdy Bullard was born in 1869 in Portland, Oregon. His family moved to San Francisco, California during his childhood.

He studied law, was admitted to the bar in California and started practicing law at the age of 21. In 1899 he moved to the Arizona Territory and settled there in Phoenix, where he lived for the next 25 years. Bullard served as Maricopa County Attorney for five years. In 1911 he was elected Attorney General of Arizona . Bullard was the first person to hold this post after Arizona became a state. His term ended in 1915, after which he returned to practicing law.

He was president of the first automobile club founded in Arizona and participated in car racing. After the death of Eugene S. Ives (1859–1917), he was appointed Chief Counsel in Arizona by the railway company Southern Pacific Lines. He also worked as an attorney for the Arizona Power Company.

At the time of his death in 1924, Bullard was in Los Angeles because of the planned merger between Southern Pacific Lines and El Paso and Southwestern Lines . Bullard was buried at the Greenwood Memory Lawn Cemetery in Phoenix, Arizona.

He was married to Pearl S. McHenry (1879–1943).
