= Ana Frohmiller =

American politician (1891–1971)

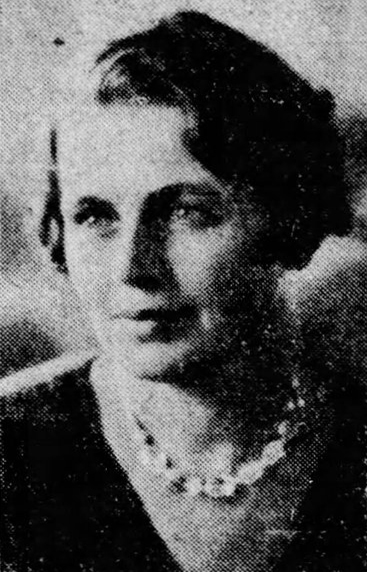

Arizona State Auditor
- In office 1927–1951
- Preceded by: Francis R. Duffy
- Succeeded by: Jewel W. Jordan

Personal details
- Born: Anastasia Collins; July 28, 1891 Burlington, Vermont, U.S.
- Died: November 25, 1971 (aged 80) Prescott, Arizona, U.S.
- Party: Democratic
- Relations: Mary Rose Wilcox (great-niece)

Anastasia Collins Frohmiller (July 28, 1891 – November 25, 1971), known as Ana, was a leading female politician in Arizona from the 1930s through the 1950s.

== Biography ==
Anastasia Collins was born to Irish Catholic parents on July 28, 1891, in Burlington, Vermont. Ana moved with her parents and siblings to Phoenix, Arizona in 1898. In 1908, her mother died giving birth to her eighth child. Ana left school to take care of her siblings. She worked several jobs and attended night classes to finish her education.

In 1916, Ana began working for Babbitt Brothers Trading Company in Flagstaff, Arizona as a bookkeeper. She married her coworker Joseph Frohmiller. Together, the couple managed the Babbitt Trading Post in Canyon Diablo. The Frohmillers divorced in 1926. In 1927, she married a friend, L. C. Stephenson, who she divorced in 1928.

In 1920, Frohmiller was elected deputy county treasurer of Coconino County. In 1922, she was appointed county treasurer. In this position, she collected more taxes than any previous county treasurer.

In 1926, Frohmiller became the first woman in the United States to serve as State Auditor. Over her tenure in the position, her diligence in the position gained her the reputation as the "Watchdog of the Arizona Treasury". Other states looked to Frohmiller to study her methods.

After being elected Auditor, Frohmiller enrolled in a law school correspondence course. She passed the State Bar, except for one section, but never retook the test. When Frohmiller, disagreeing with the state attorney general over an expense, filed suit with the Arizona Supreme Court, the court ruled that she was empowered to represent her office in court as a constitutional officer of the state.

Frohmiller was elected as Auditor eleven more times. In 1950, she withdrew from office to run for Governor of Arizona. Beating five male opponents, including the incumbent governor Dan Edward Garvey for the Democratic nomination. With a 9,000 vote margin over her nearest competitor, she became Arizona's first female gubernatorial nominee. She planned a campaign focused on the voters, with no campaign headquarters, posters, or billboards. The Democratic party did not provide funds or volunteers for her ensuing campaign. Though a bureau chief for the United Press, Dick Smith, managed Frohmiller's campaign, he died of a heart attack during a political rally for Frohmiller, and she decided not to replace him.

Ultimately, Frohmiller's campaign against Republican nominee Howard Pyle was unsuccessful. Arizona Senator and Republican presidential candidate Barry Goldwater (who ran Pyle's campaign) wrote in his memoir With No Apologies that Frohmiller was 'an attractive lady... who had earned quite a following as a result of her long and excellent service as state auditor'. He also observed that the voters of Arizona weren't ready for a woman governor in 1950. Frohmiller lost the election to Pyle by less than 3,000 votes– less than one percent. Pyle became the first Republican Governor of Arizona since John Calhoun Phillips in 1928, despite the fact that at the time of her nomination Frohmiller seemed to be the front-runner.

Following her loss, Frohmiller joined Arizona Savings and Loan as secretary and auditor. Two years later, she became the founding treasurer of Southwest Savings and Loan. She became the firm's comptroller in 1958. She was known as one of Arizona's leading figures in mortgage banking. In 1959, Superior Court Judge Lorna E. Lockwood appointed Frohmiller to serve as analyst to the receivership of the then-bankrupt Arizona Savings and Loan. Frohmiller served a year in this position, before retiring from public life.

She retired to Granite Dells, near Prescott, Yavapai County, Arizona. Frohmiller had many heart attacks before dying on November 25, 1971, aged 80.

== Legacy ==
A resolution in memory of Frohmiller was passed by the Arizona Senate and House of Representatives in February, 1972. The resolution provided a biography and extended condolences to her family.

In 1982, Frohmiller was inducted into the Arizona Women's Hall of Fame. Her great-niece Mary Rose Wilcox is an Arizona state politician.

Party political offices
Preceded by Dan Edward Garvey	Democratic nominee for Governor of Arizona; 1950	Succeeded by Joe Haldiman
