= 1948 Arizona gubernatorial election =

- November 2, 1948
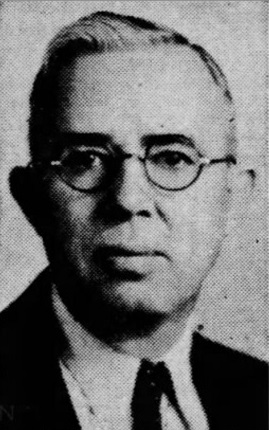

Nominee	Dan Edward Garvey	Bruce Brockett
Party	Democratic	Republican
Popular vote	104,008	70,419
Percentage	59.17%	40.06%
- County results Garvey: 50–60% 60–70% 80–90%
Governor before election
Dan Edward Garvey
Democratic
Elected Governor
Dan Edward Garvey
Democratic

The 1948 Arizona gubernatorial election took place on November 2, 1948. Following the death of Governor Sidney Preston Osborn while in office, Dan Edward Garvey, who was serving as Secretary of State of Arizona was ascended to the position of governor, and thus ran for a full term. Facing a crowded primary field, Garvey emerged successful as the Democratic party's nominee.

Dan Edward Garvey was challenged by Republican Bruce Brockett in the general election, who had run in 1946 against Osborn, and had previously signaled a shift in voters becoming more Republican, outperforming their past electoral failures significantly. Despite this, Garvey was elected to a full term, and was sworn in on January 4, 1949.

== Democratic primary ==
=== Candidates ===
- Dan Edward Garvey, incumbent Governor (ascended to Governor following the death of Sidney P. Osborn)
- Richard F. Harless, U.S. Congressman
- Jim Smith
- J. Melvin Goodson, state representative
- Thad M. Moore, Arizona State Tax Commission
- Marvin E. Smith, state senator
- Howard Sprouse, state senator

=== Results ===
Democratic primary results
Party	Candidate	Votes	%
Democratic	Dan Edward Garvey (incumbent)	34,756	28.04%
Democratic	Richard F. Harless	25,084	20.23%
Democratic	Jim Smith	19,723	15.91%
Democratic	J. Melvin Goodson	19,478	15.71%
Democratic	Thad M. Moore	13,091	10.56%
Democratic	Marvin E. Smith	11,219	9.05%
Democratic	Howard Sprouse	616	0.50%
Total votes		123,967	100.00%

== Republican primary ==
=== Candidates ===
- Bruce Brockett, cattleman and Republican nominee for governor in 1946
- William R. Bourden, state legislator

=== Results ===
Republican primary results
Party	Candidate	Votes	%
Republican	Bruce Brockett	10,562	58.17%
Republican	William R. Bourden	7,595	41.83%
Total votes		18,157	100.00%

== General election ==
Arizona gubernatorial election, 1948
Party	Candidate	Votes	%	±%
Democratic	Dan Edward Garvey (incumbent)	104,008	59.17%	−0.92%
Republican	Bruce Brockett	70,419	40.06%	+0.16%
Prohibition	Ernest Pohle	1,340	0.76%	+0.76%
Majority		33,589	19.11%	
Total votes		175,767	100.00%	
Democratic hold		Swing	-1.08%	

=== Results by county ===
County	Dan Edward Garvey Democratic		Bruce Brockett Republican		Ernest Pohle Prohibition		Margin		Total votes cast
County	#	%	#	%	#	%	#	%	Total votes cast
Apache	1,544	63.91%	862	35.68%	10	0.41%	682	28.23%	2,416
Cochise	7,121	68.84%	3,184	30.78%	39	0.38%	3,937	38.06%	10,344
Coconino	2,716	60.20%	1,779	39.43%	17	0.38%	937	20.77%	4,512
Gila	5,036	68.86%	2,235	30.56%	42	0.57%	2,801	38.30%	7,313
Graham	2,115	61.45%	1,310	38.06%	17	0.49%	805	23.39%	3,442
Greenlee	2,308	80.73%	539	18.85%	12	0.42%	1,769	61.87%	2,859
Maricopa	41,257	53.04%	35,672	45.86%	849	1.09%	5,585	7.18%	77,778
Mohave	1,858	67.88%	860	31.42%	19	0.69%	998	36.46%	2,737
Navajo	3,003	65.71%	1,556	34.05%	11	0.24%	1,447	31.66%	4,570
Pima	22,003	62.04%	13,297	37.50%	163	0.46%	8,706	24.55%	35,463
Pinal	3,755	63.55%	2,132	36.08%	22	0.37%	1,623	27.47%	5,909
Santa Cruz	1,736	68.11%	790	30.99%	23	0.90%	946	37.11%	2,549
Yavapai	4,909	54.92%	3,940	44.08%	90	1.01%	969	10.84%	8,939
Yuma	4,647	67.00%	2,263	32.63%	26	0.37%	2,384	34.37%	6,936
Totals	104,008	59.17%	70,419	40.06%	1,340	0.76%	33,589	19.11%	175,767
