= 1922 United States House of Representatives election in Arizona =

1922 United States House of Representatives elections in Arizona
- November 7, 1922
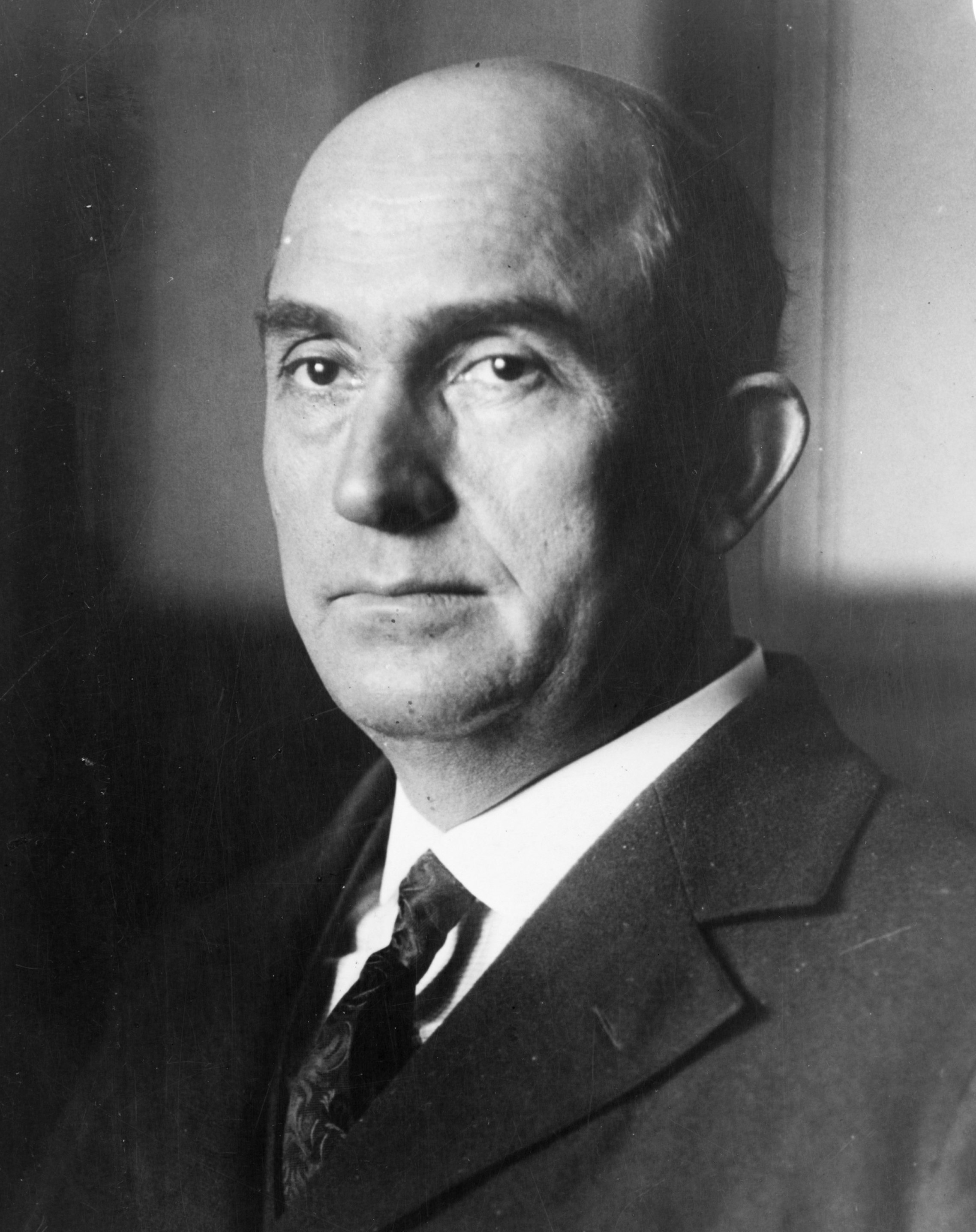

Nominee	Carl Hayden	Emma M. Guild
Party	Democratic	Republican
Popular vote	45,121	14,601
Percentage	75.6%	24.4%
- County results Hayden: 60–70% 70–80% 80–90%
Representative
At-large before election
Carl Hayden
Democratic
Elected Representative
At-large
Carl Hayden
Democratic

The 1922 United States House of Representatives elections in Arizona was held on Tuesday November 7, 1922 to elect the state's sole at-large representative. Incumbent democrat, Carl Hayden won re-election to a seventh term with 76 percent of the vote against Republican candidate, Emma Guild's 24 percent of the vote.

Both nominees were unopposed in their primary elections which were held on September 12, 1922.

== General Election ==
Arizona At-large congressional district election, 1922
Party	Candidate	Votes	%
Democratic	Carl Hayden (Incumbent)	45,121	75.55%
Republican	Emma M. Guild	14,601	24.45%
Total votes		59,722	100.00
