= 1920 United States House of Representatives election in Arizona =

1920 United States House of Representatives elections in Arizona
- November 2, 1920
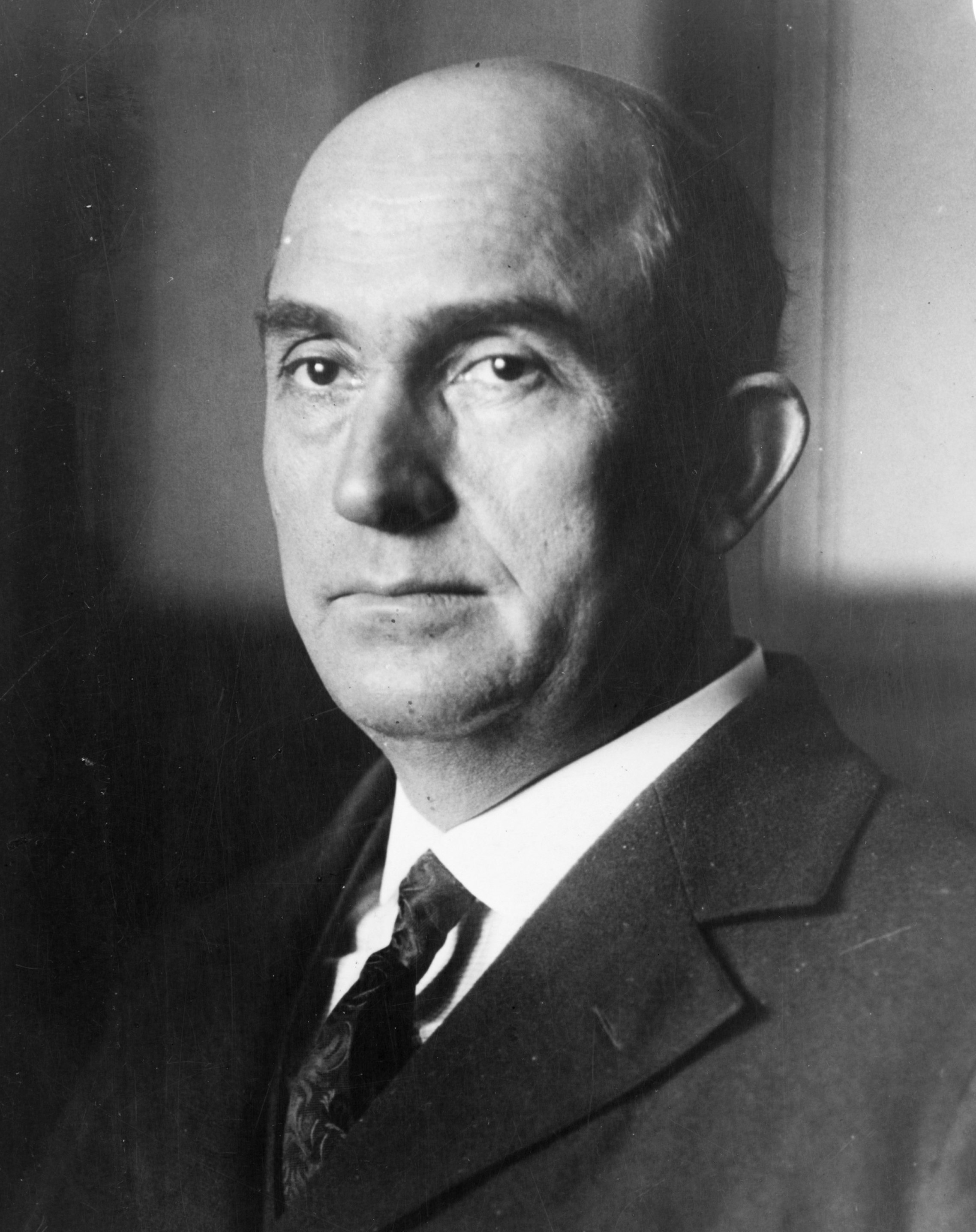

Nominee	Carl Hayden	James Dunseath
Party	Democratic	Republican
Popular vote	35,397	25,841
Percentage	57.8%	42.2%
- County results Hayden: 50–60% 60–70% Dunseath: 50–60%
Representative
At-large before election
Carl Hayden
Democratic
Elected Representative
At-large
Carl Hayden
Democratic

The 1920 United States House of Representatives elections in Arizona was held on Tuesday November 2, 1920 to elect the state's sole at-large representative. Incumbent democrat, Carl Hayden won re-election to a sixth term with 58 percent of the vote.

Both nominees were unopposed in their primary elections which were held on September 7, 1920.

== General Election ==
Arizona At-large congressional district election, 1916
Party	Candidate	Votes	%
Democratic	Carl Hayden (Incumbent)	35,397	57.80%
Republican	Thomas Maddock	25,841	42.20%
Total votes		44,381	100.00
