= 1914 United States House of Representatives election in Arizona =

1914 United States House of Representatives elections in Arizona
- November 2, 1914
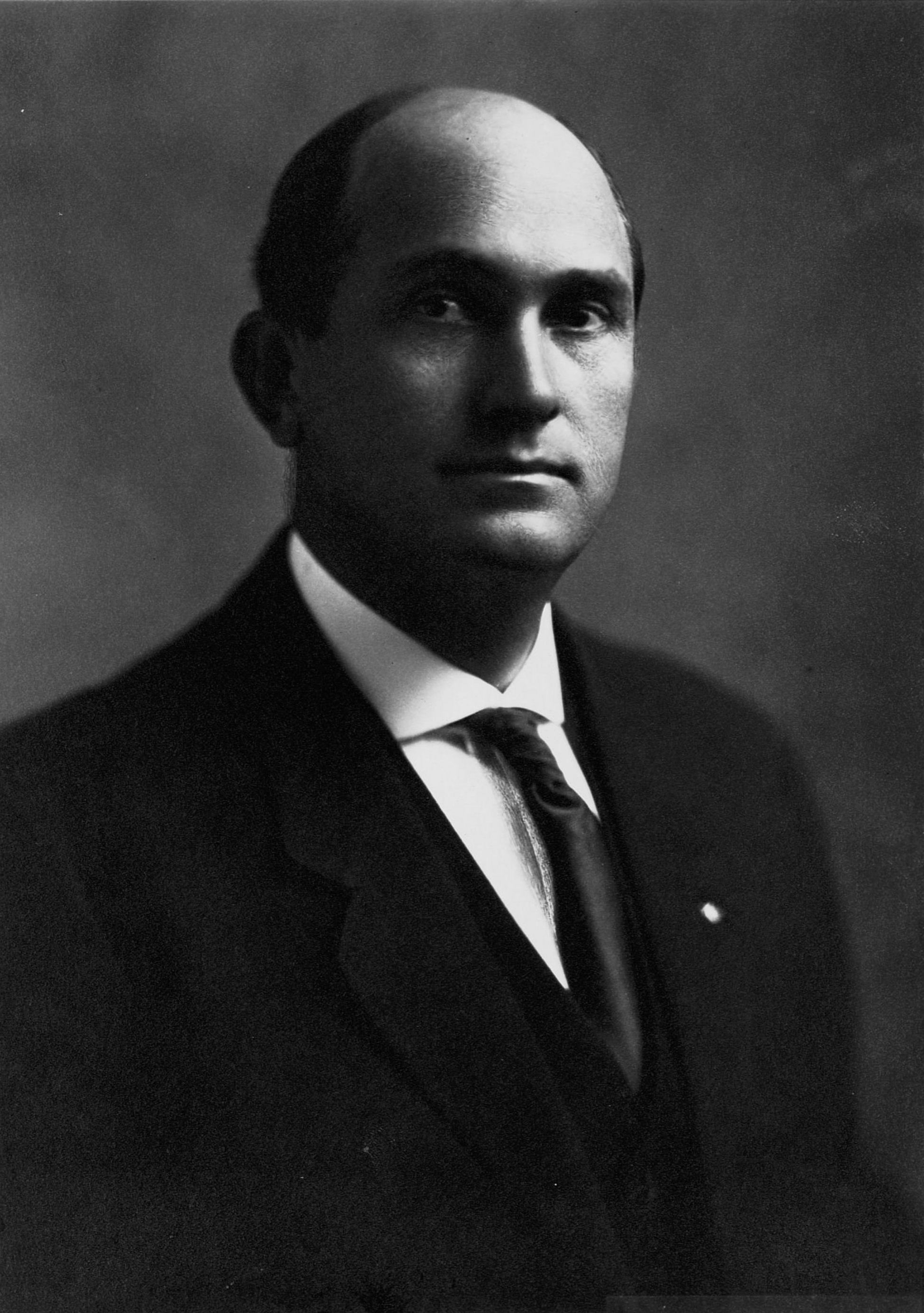

| Nominee | Carl Hayden | Henry L. Eads | Ulrich Grill |
| Party | Democratic | Republican | Socialist |
| Popular vote | 33,306 | 7,586 | 3,773 |
| Percentage | 74.57% | 16.98% | 8.45% |
- County results Hayden: 60–70% 70–80% 80–90%
Representative
At-large before election
Carl Hayden
Democratic
Elected Representative
At-large
Carl Hayden
Democratic

The 1914 United States House of Representatives elections in Arizona was held on Tuesday November 2, 1914 to elect the state's sole at-large representative. incumbent democrat, Carl Hayden won re-election by a landslide margin of 57.59%, winning every county in the state with over 60 percent of the vote.

Primary elections were held on September 8, 1914.

== General Election ==
Arizona At-large congressional district election, 1912
| Party | Candidate | Votes | % |
|---|---|---|---|
| Democratic | Carl Hayden (Incumbent) | 33,306 | 74.57% |
| Republican | Henry L. Eads | 7,586 | 16.98% |
| Socialist | A. Charles Smith | 3,773 | 8.45% |
| Total votes | | 44,665 | 100.00 |
