= 1916 United States House of Representatives election in Arizona =

1916 United States House of Representatives elections in Arizona
- November 7, 1916
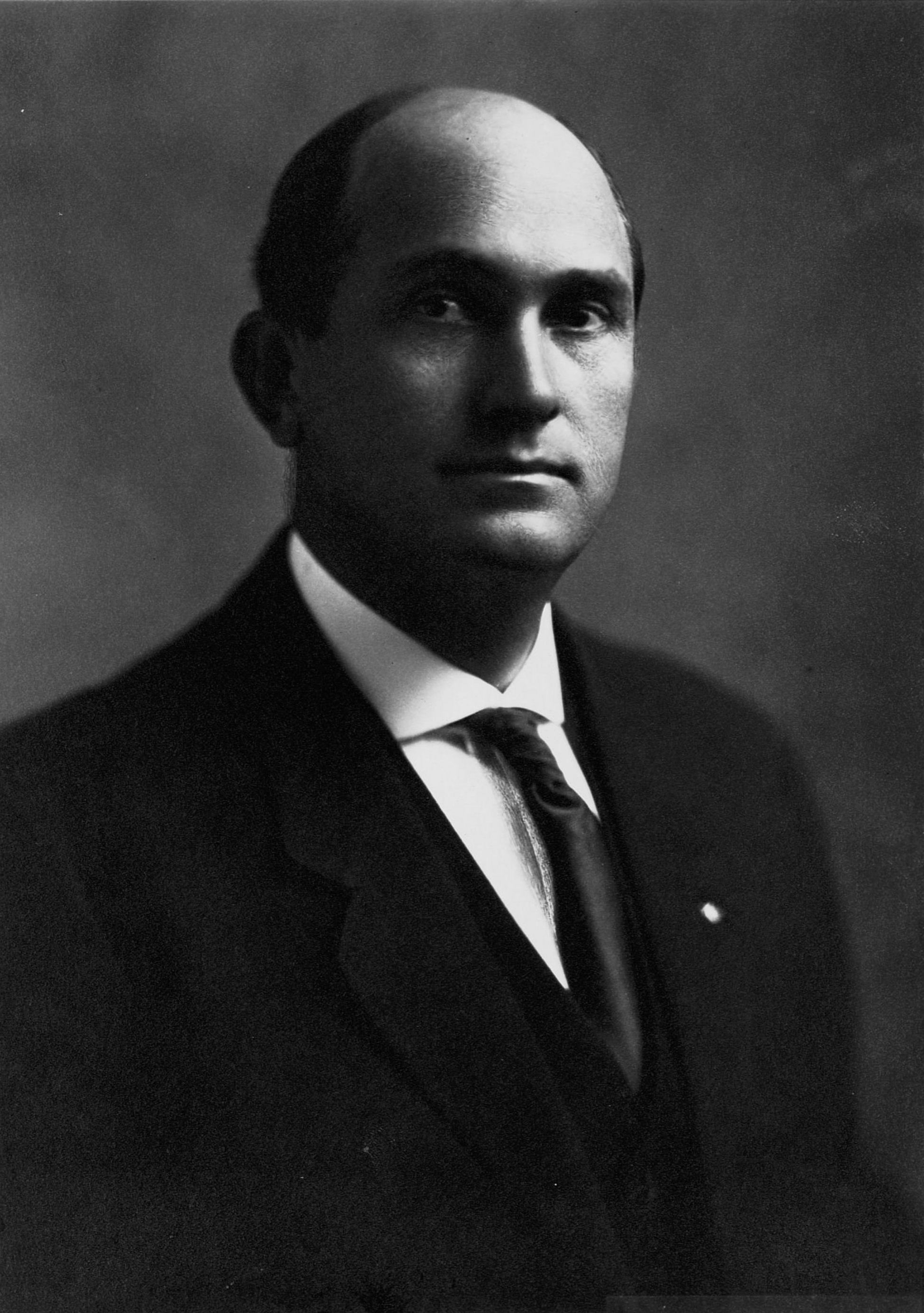

| Nominee | Carl Hayden | Henry L. Eads | Peter Robertson |
| Party | Democratic | Republican | Socialist |
| Popular vote | 34,377 | 14,907 | 3,060 |
| Percentage | 65.68% | 28.48% | 5.85% |
- County results Hayden: 50–60% 60–70% 70–80%
Representative
At-large before election
Carl Hayden
Democratic
Elected Representative
At-large
Carl Hayden
Democratic

The 1916 United States House of Representatives elections in Arizona was held on Tuesday November 7, 1916 to elect the state's one at-large representative. incumbent democrat, Carl Hayden won re-election to a fourth term with 66 percent of the vote.

Primary elections were held on September 12, 1916.

== Democratic primary ==
Democratic primary results
| Party | Candidate | Votes | % |
|---|---|---|---|
| Democratic | Carl Hayden | 19,518 | 71.49% |
| Democratic | L. A. Foraley | 7,784 | 28.51% |
| Total votes | | 27,302 | 100.00 |

== General Election ==
Arizona At-large congressional district election, 1916
| Party | Candidate | Votes | % |
|---|---|---|---|
| Democratic | Carl Hayden (Incumbent) | 34,377 | 65.68% |
| Republican | Henry L. Eads | 14,907 | 28.48% |
| Socialist | A. Charles Smith | 3,060 | 5.85% |
| Total votes | | 52,344 | 100.00 |
