= 1924 United States House of Representatives election in Arizona =

1922 United States House of Representatives elections in Arizona
- November 4, 1924
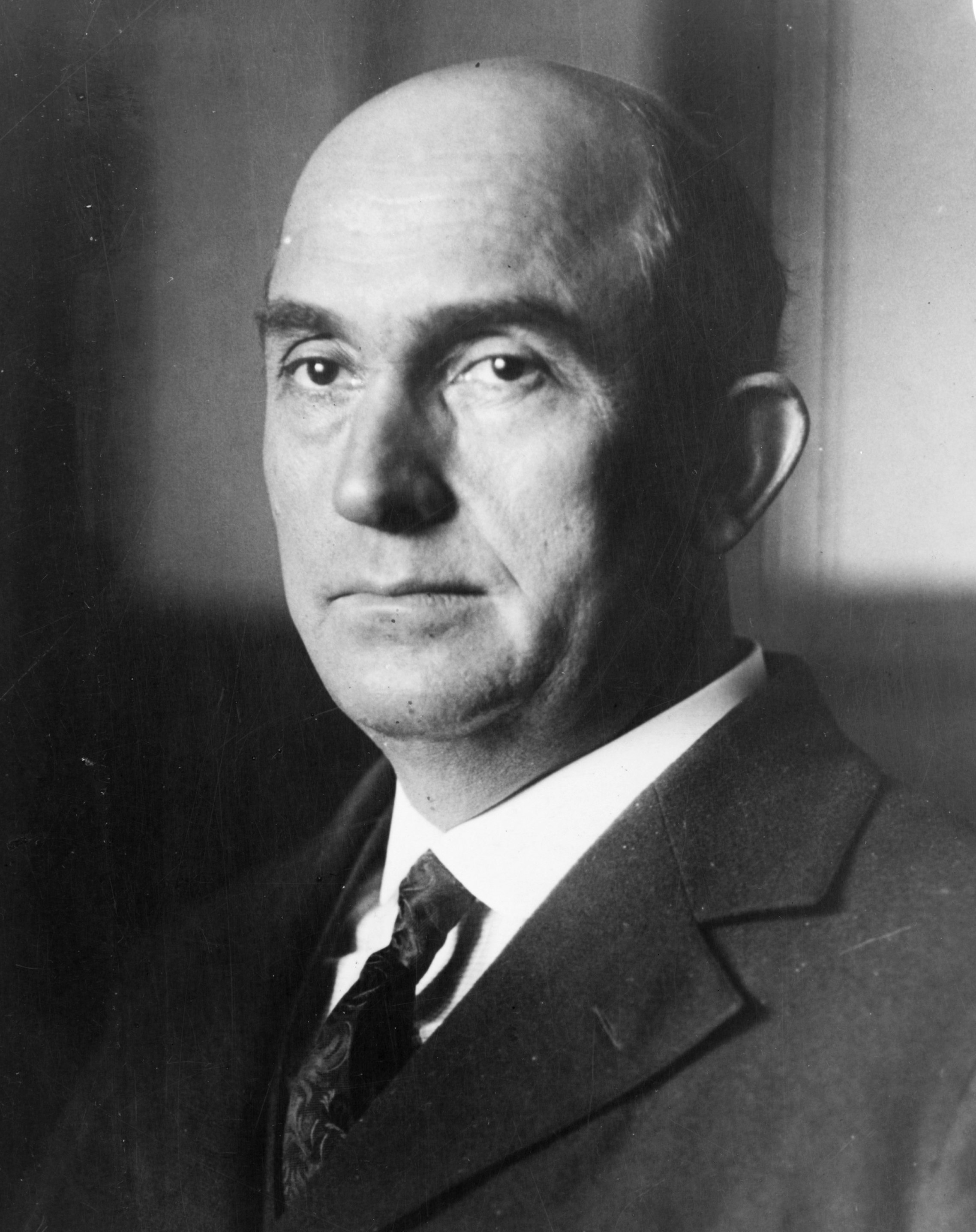

Nominee	Carl Hayden	W. J. Galbraith
Party	Democratic	Republican
Popular vote	40,329	8,628
Percentage	82.3%	17.6%
- County results Hayden: 60–70% 70–80% 80–90% >90%
Representative
At-large before election
Carl Hayden
Democratic
Elected Representative
At-large
Carl Hayden
Democratic

The 1924 United States House of Representatives elections in Arizona was held on Tuesday November 4, 1924 to elect the state's one at-large representative. Incumbent Democrat Carl Hayden won re-election to an eighth term with 82 percent of the vote against former Republican Attorney General W. J. Galbraith who got only 18% of the vote.

Primary elections were held on September 9, 1924.

== General election ==
Arizona At-large congressional district election, 1924
Party	Candidate	Votes	%
Democratic	Carl Hayden (Incumbent)	40,329	82.26%
Republican	W. J. Galbraith	8,628	17.60%
Independent	George H. Maxwell	72	0.15%
Total votes		49,026	100.00
