= Dan Edward Garvey =

Arizona politician (1886–1974)

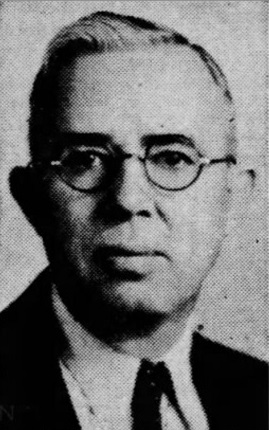

8th Governor of Arizona
- In office May 25, 1948 – January 1, 1951
- Preceded by: Sidney Preston Osborn
- Succeeded by: John Howard Pyle

10th Secretary of State of Arizona
- In office November 27, 1942 – May 25, 1948
- Governor: Sidney Preston Osborn
- Preceded by: Harry M. Moore
- Succeeded by: Curtis M. Williams

Personal details
- Born: June 19, 1886 Vicksburg, Mississippi, U.S.
- Died: February 5, 1974 (aged 87) Tucson, Arizona, U.S.
- Party: Democratic

Dan Edward Garvey (June 19, 1886 – February 5, 1974) was an American businessman, politician and the ninth secretary of state of Arizona from 1942 to 1948 under Sidney Preston Osborn and the eighth governor of Arizona from 1948 to 1951. He was the first of many people to ascend to the office of Governor from the Secretaryship.

== Early career ==
Born in Vicksburg, Mississippi, Garvey graduated from St. Aloysius High School and worked for the Illinois Central Railroad. In 1909, he moved to the Arizona Territory to work as a railroad accountant for Randolph Railroad Co., a company later absorbed by the Southern Pacific Railroad. Later, he entered the automobile business, but it failed during the Great Depression.

== Political career ==
Garvey was hired by the Pima County treasurer's office in 1931. He became Pima County treasurer in 1935 and Tucson city treasurer in 1938. Garvey became known throughout Arizona during the next two decades as a dedicated public servant. He moved to Phoenix in 1940 when he was hired as assistant to Secretary of State Harry M. Moore. Upon Moore's death in 1942, Garvey was appointed to succeed him by Governor Sidney P. Osborn, himself the first Secretary of State during most of the 1910s. Garvey was elected to the office twice, in 1944 and 1946.

Garvey assumed the governorship, in accordance with the Arizona Constitution, when Osborn died on May 25, 1948. That fall, Garvey won a full term on the Democratic ticket by a fair margin, despite winning only about 28.04% of the vote in a heavily splintered Democratic primary. He presided over one of the largest growth periods in Arizona history between 1948 and 1951.

A large majority of Arizona newcomers were Republicans and Arizona became a bona fide two-party state for the first time. Garvey was defeated in the Democratic primary in 1950 by State Auditor Ana Frohmiller in another cluttered primary: Garvey won only 22.55% of the vote compared to her 29.24%.

At the end of his elected term as governor, Garvey was appointed Arizona administrator for the federal Reconstruction Finance Corporation. In 1955, Governor Ernest W. McFarland appointed him state examiner, a position mandated by the state constitution which was responsible for reviewing and certifying the annual financial reports of the state government's agencies and offices. The position was eliminated by a statewide referendum in 1968, and Garvey retired in 1969.

Party political offices
Preceded by Sidney Preston Osborn	Democratic nominee for Governor of Arizona; 1948	Succeeded by Ana Frohmiller
Political offices
Preceded by Harry M. Moore	Secretary of State of Arizona; November 27, 1942 – May 25, 1948	Succeeded by Curtis M. Williams
Preceded by Sidney Preston Osborn	Governor of Arizona; May 25, 1948 – January 1, 1951	Succeeded by John Howard Pyle
