= 1918 United States House of Representatives election in Arizona =

1918 United States House of Representatives elections in Arizona
- November 5, 1918
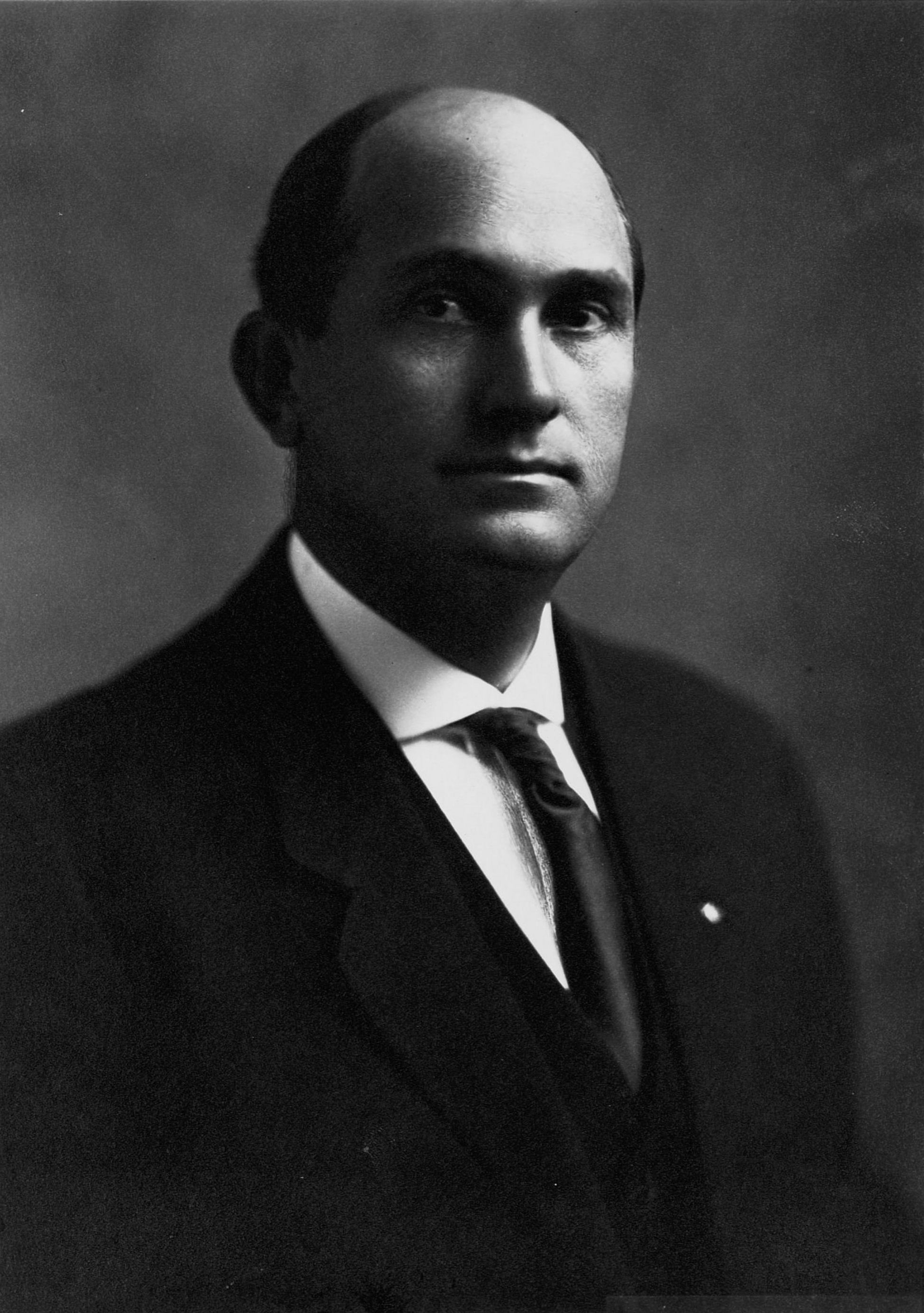

Nominee	Carl Hayden	Thomas Maddock
Party	Democratic	Republican
Popular vote	26,805	16,822
Percentage	60.4%	37.9%
- County results Hayden: 50–60% 60–70% 70–80%
Representative
At-large before election
Carl Hayden
Democratic
Elected Representative
At-large
Carl Hayden
Democratic

The 1918 United States House of Representatives elections in Arizona was held on Tuesday November 5, 1918 to elect the state's sole at-large representative. incumbent democrat, Carl Hayden won re-election to a fifth term with 60 percent of the vote.

Primary elections were held on September 10, 1918.

== General Election ==
Arizona At-large congressional district election, 1916
Party	Candidate	Votes	%
Democratic	Carl Hayden (Incumbent)	26,805	60.4%
Republican	Thomas Maddock	16,822	37.90%
Socialist	Peter T. Robertson	754	1.70%
Total votes		44,381	100.00
