= Richard F. Harless =

American politician (1905–1970)

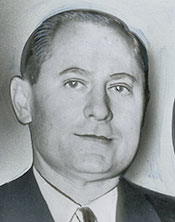

Member of the U.S. House of Representatives from Arizona's at-large district
- In office January 3, 1943 – January 3, 1949
- Preceded by: 2nd Seat created
- Succeeded by: Seat abolished

Personal details
- Born: August 6, 1905 Kelsey, Texas, US
- Died: November 24, 1970 (aged 65) Phoenix, Arizona
- Party: Democratic Party
- Education: University of Arizona

Richard Fielding Harless (August 6, 1905 – November 24, 1970) was a U.S. representative from Arizona.

== Life and career ==
Born in Kelsey, Texas, Harless moved to Thatcher, Arizona, in 1917 and attended the grade and high schools. He graduated from University of Arizona in 1928. He taught school at Marana, Arizona from 1928 to 1930. He graduated from the law school of the University of Arizona in 1933. He was admitted to the bar the same year and commenced practice in Phoenix, Arizona.

In Phoenix, Harless assumed the role of Assistant City Attorney and, in 1936, was elected to the position of Assistant Attorney General for the state of Arizona. From 1938 to 1942, Harless served as Maricopa County Attorney. He was married to Meredith Howard Harless, a writer and radio personality. They wed on November 28, 1948, in Alexandria, Virginia.

Harless was elected as a Democrat to the Seventy-eighth, Seventy-ninth, and Eightieth Congresses (January 3, 1943 – January 3, 1949). He was one of the main sponsors of the Indian Voting Rights Act of 1947.

Harless did not seek renomination in the 1948 House election, and was unsuccessful in an attempt to gain the gubernatorial nomination. He was an unsuccessful candidate for the Democratic nomination in 1954 for the Eighty-fourth Congress. He was Democratic nominee in 1960 for the Eighty-seventh Congress but was not elected. He resumed the practice of law.

He died in Phoenix on November 24, 1970, and was interred in Greenwood Memorial Park in that city.

U.S. House of Representatives
Preceded by Seat created	Member of the U.S. House of Representatives from Arizona's at-large congressional district 1943-1949	Succeeded by Seat abolished
