= List of United States representatives in the 78th Congress =

This is a complete list of United States representatives during the 78th United States Congress listed by seniority.

As an historical article, the districts and party affiliations listed reflect those during the 78th Congress (January 3, 1943 – January 3, 1945). Seats and party affiliations on similar lists for other congresses will be different for certain members.

Seniority depends on the date on which members were sworn into office. Since many members are sworn in on the same day, subsequent ranking is based on previous congressional service of the individual and then by alphabetical order by the last name of the representative.

Committee chairmanship in the House is often associated with seniority. However, party leadership is typically not associated with seniority.

Note: The "*" indicates that the representative/delegate may have served one or more non-consecutive terms while in the House of Representatives of the United States Congress.

== U.S. House seniority list ==
U.S. House seniority
Rank	Representative	Party	District	Seniority date (Previous service, if any)	No.# of term(s)	Notes
1	Adolph J. Sabath	D	IL-05	March 4, 1907	19th term	Dean of the House
2	Robert L. Doughton	D	NC-09	March 4, 1911	17th term	
3	Sam Rayburn	D	TX-04	March 4, 1913	16th term	Speaker of the House
4	Hatton W. Sumners	D	TX-05	March 4, 1913	16th term	
5	Allen T. Treadway	R	MA-01	March 4, 1913	16th term	Left the House in 1945.
6	Carl Vinson	D	GA-06	November 3, 1914	16th term	
7	Henry B. Steagall	D	AL-03	March 4, 1915	15th term	Died on November 22, 1943.
8	Harold Knutson	R	MN-06	March 4, 1917	14th term	
9	Clarence F. Lea	D	CA-01	March 4, 1917	14th term	
10	Joseph J. Mansfield	D	TX-09	March 4, 1917	14th term	
11	S. Otis Bland	D	VA-01	July 2, 1918	14th term	
12	Thomas H. Cullen	D	NY-04	March 4, 1919	13th term	Died on March 1, 1944.
13	Daniel A. Reed	R	NY-43	March 4, 1919	13th term	
14	Fritz G. Lanham	D	TX-12	April 19, 1919	13th term	
15	Patrick H. Drewry	D	VA-04	April 27, 1920	13th term	
16	Hamilton Fish Jr.	R	NY-26	November 2, 1920	13th term	Left the House in 1945.
17	Hampton P. Fulmer	D	SC-02	March 4, 1921	12th term	Died on October 19, 1944.
18	John E. Rankin	D	MS-01	March 4, 1921	12th term	
19	Roy O. Woodruff	R	MI-10	March 4, 1921; Previous service, 1913–1915.	13th term*	
20	Charles L. Gifford	R	MA-09	November 7, 1922	12th term	
21	Sol Bloom	D	NY-19	March 4, 1923	11th term	
22	Clarence Cannon	D	MO-09	March 4, 1923	11th term	
23	Emanuel Celler	D	NY-10	March 4, 1923	11th term	
24	Robert Crosser	D	OH-21	March 4, 1923; Previous service, 1913–1919.	14th term*	
25	Samuel Dickstein	D	NY-12	March 4, 1923	11th term	
26	Luther Alexander Johnson	D	TX-06	March 4, 1923	11th term	
27	John Taber	R	NY-36	March 4, 1923	11th term	
28	Clifton A. Woodrum	D	VA-06	March 4, 1923	11th term	
29	John H. Kerr	D	NC-02	November 6, 1923	11th term	
30	Albert E. Carter	R	CA-06	March 4, 1925	10th term	Left the House in 1945.
31	Edward E. Cox	D	GA-02	March 4, 1925	10th term	
32	Charles Aubrey Eaton	R	NJ-05	March 4, 1925	10th term	
33	Robert A. Green	D	FL	March 4, 1925	10th term	Resigned on November 25, 1944.
34	Thomas A. Jenkins	R	OH-10	March 4, 1925	10th term	
35	Joseph William Martin Jr.	R	MA-14	March 4, 1925	10th term	
36	Mary Teresa Norton	D	NJ-13	March 4, 1925	10th term	
37	Andrew Lawrence Somers	D	NY-06	March 4, 1925	10th term	
38	William Madison Whittington	D	MS-03	March 4, 1925	10th term	
39	Edith Nourse Rogers	R	MA-05	June 30, 1925	10th term	
40	Harry Lane Englebright	R	CA-02	August 31, 1926	10th term	Died on May 13, 1943.
41	Richard J. Welch	R	CA-05	August 31, 1926	10th term	
42	John J. Cochran	D	MO-13	November 2, 1926	10th term	
43	James M. Fitzpatrick	D	NY-24	March 4, 1927	9th term	Left the House in 1945.
44	Ulysses Samuel Guyer	R	KS-02	March 4, 1927; Previous service, 1924–1925.	10th term*	Died on June 5, 1943.
45	Clifford R. Hope	R	KS-05	March 4, 1927	9th term	
46	Jed Johnson	D	OK-06	March 4, 1927	9th term	
47	Malcolm C. Tarver	D	GA-07	March 4, 1927	9th term	
48	Charles A. Wolverton	R	NJ-01	March 4, 1927	9th term	
49	Clarence E. Hancock	R	NY-35	November 8, 1927	9th term	
50	Francis D. Culkin	R	NY-32	November 6, 1928	9th term	Died on August 4, 1943.
51	John William McCormack	D	MA-12	November 6, 1928	9th term	
52	Richard B. Wigglesworth	R	MA-13	November 6, 1928	9th term	
53	James Wolfenden	R	PA-08	November 6, 1928	9th term	
54	J. Bayard Clark	D	NC-07	March 4, 1929	8th term	
55	Jere Cooper	D	TN-09	March 4, 1929	8th term	
56	Fred A. Hartley	R	NJ-10	March 4, 1929	8th term	
57	William P. Lambertson	R	KS-01	March 4, 1929	8th term	Left the House in 1945.
58	Louis Ludlow	D	IN-11	March 4, 1929	8th term	
59	Wright Patman	D	TX-01	March 4, 1929	8th term	
60	Joe L. Smith	D	WV-06	March 4, 1929	8th term	Left the House in 1945.
61	Robert Ramspeck	D	GA-05	October 2, 1929	8th term	
62	Joseph A. Gavagan	D	NY-21	November 5, 1929	8th term	Resigned on December 30, 1943.
63	J. Roland Kinzer	R	PA-10	January 28, 1930	8th term	
64	Martin J. Kennedy	D	NY-18	April 11, 1930	8th term	Left the House in 1945.
65	Walter G. Andrews	R	NY-40	March 4, 1931	7th term	
66	Alfred L. Bulwinkle	D	NC-11	March 4, 1931; Previous service, 1921–1929.	11th term*	
67	Thomas G. Burch	D	VA-05	March 4, 1931	7th term	
68	Virgil Chapman	D	KY-07	March 4, 1931; Previous service, 1925–1929.	9th term*	
69	Martin Dies Jr.	D	TX-02	March 4, 1931	7th term	Left the House in 1945.
70	Wesley Ernest Disney	D	OK-01	March 4, 1931	7th term	Left the House in 1945.
71	John W. Flannagan Jr.	D	VA-09	March 4, 1931	7th term	
72	Fred C. Gilchrist	R	IA-06	March 4, 1931	7th term	Left the House in 1945.
73	Pehr G. Holmes	R	MA-04	March 4, 1931	7th term	
74	Andrew J. May	D	KY-06	March 4, 1931	7th term	
75	Leonard W. Schuetz	D	IL-07	March 4, 1931	7th term	Died on February 13, 1944.
76	Howard W. Smith	D	VA-08	March 4, 1931	7th term	
77	Brent Spence	D	KY-05	March 4, 1931	7th term	
78	R. Ewing Thomason	D	TX-16	March 4, 1931	7th term	
79	Zebulon Weaver	D	NC-12	March 4, 1931; Previous service, 1917–1919 and 1919–1929.	13th term**	
80	Jesse P. Wolcott	R	MI-07	March 4, 1931	7th term	
81	John J. Delaney	D	NY-07	November 3, 1931; Previous service, 1918–1919.	8th term*	
82	Richard M. Kleberg	D	TX-14	November 24, 1931	7th term	Left the House in 1945.
83	Leo E. Allen	R	IL-13	March 4, 1933	6th term	
84	William M. Colmer	D	MS-06	March 4, 1933	6th term	
85	John D. Dingell Sr.	D	MI-15	March 4, 1933	6th term	
86	Everett Dirksen	R	IL-16	March 4, 1933	6th term	
87	J. William Ditter	R	PA-17	March 4, 1933	6th term	Died on November 21, 1943.
88	George Anthony Dondero	R	MI-17	March 4, 1933	6th term	
89	Thomas F. Ford	D	CA-14	March 4, 1933	6th term	Left the House in 1945.
90	John Kee	D	WV-05	March 4, 1933	6th term	
91	John Lesinski Sr.	D	MI-16	March 4, 1933	6th term	
92	Lawrence Lewis	D	CO-01	March 4, 1933	6th term	Died on December 9, 1943.
93	Donald H. McLean	R	NJ-06	March 4, 1933	6th term	Left the House in 1945.
94	James W. Mott	R	OR-01	March 4, 1933	6th term	
95	J. Hardin Peterson	D	FL-01	March 4, 1933	6th term	
96	D. Lane Powers	R	NJ-04	March 4, 1933	6th term	
97	Jennings Randolph	D	WV-02	March 4, 1933	6th term	
98	B. Carroll Reece	R	TN-01	March 4, 1933; Previous service, 1921–1931.	11th term*	
99	James P. Richards	D	SC-05	March 4, 1933	6th term	
100	Absalom Willis Robertson	D	VA-07	March 4, 1933	6th term	
101	J. W. Robinson	D	UT-02	March 4, 1933	6th term	
102	J. Buell Snyder	D	PA-24	March 4, 1933	6th term	
103	James Wolcott Wadsworth Jr.	R	NY-39	March 4, 1933	6th term	
104	Francis E. Walter	D	PA-21	March 4, 1933	6th term	
105	Compton I. White	D	ID-01	March 4, 1933	6th term	
106	Milton H. West	D	TX-15	April 23, 1933	6th term	
107	Paul Brown	D	GA-10	July 5, 1933	6th term	
108	Charles Albert Plumley	R	VT	January 16, 1934	6th term	
109	Harold D. Cooley	D	NC-04	July 7, 1934	6th term	
110	August H. Andresen	R	MN-01	January 3, 1935; Previous service, 1925–1933.	9th term*	
111	Leslie C. Arends	R	IL-17	January 3, 1935	5th term	
112	Graham A. Barden	D	NC-03	January 3, 1935	5th term	
113	C. Jasper Bell	D	MO-04	January 3, 1935	5th term	
114	Charles A. Buckley	D	NY-23	January 3, 1935	5th term	
115	Usher Burdick	R	ND	January 3, 1935	5th term	Left the House in 1945.
116	Frank Carlson	R	KS-06	January 3, 1935	5th term	
117	John M. Costello	D	CA-15	January 3, 1935	5th term	Left the House in 1945.
118	W. Sterling Cole	R	NY-37	January 3, 1935	5th term	
119	Fred L. Crawford	R	MI-08	January 3, 1935	5th term	
120	Albert J. Engel	D	MI-09	January 3, 1935	5th term	
121	Bertrand W. Gearhart	R	CA-09	January 3, 1935	5th term	
122	John W. Gwynne	R	IA-03	January 3, 1935	5th term	
123	Edward J. Hart	D	NJ-14	January 3, 1935	5th term	
124	Sam Hobbs	D	AL-04	January 3, 1935	5th term	
125	Clare Hoffman	R	MI-04	January 3, 1935	5th term	
126	Merlin Hull	R	WI-09	January 3, 1935; Previous service, 1929–1931.	6th term*	
127	Melvin Maas	R	MN-04	January 3, 1935; Previous service, 1927–1933.	8th term*	Left the House in 1945.
128	George H. Mahon	D	TX-19	January 3, 1935	5th term	
129	Dan R. McGehee	D	MS-07	January 3, 1935	5th term	
130	Matthew J. Merritt	D	NY	January 3, 1935	5th term	Left the House in 1945.
131	Earl C. Michener	R	MI-02	January 3, 1935; Previous service, 1919–1933.	12th term*	
132	John Conover Nichols	D	OK-02	January 3, 1935	5th term	Resigned on July 3, 1943.
133	James A. O'Leary	D	NY-11	January 3, 1935	5th term	Died on March 16, 1944.
134	Emmet O'Neal	D	KY-03	January 3, 1935	5th term	
135	Nat Patton	D	TX-07	January 3, 1935	5th term	Left the House in 1945.
136	Hugh Peterson	D	GA-01	January 3, 1935	5th term	
137	Joseph L. Pfeifer	D	NY-03	January 3, 1935	5th term	
138	Louis C. Rabaut	D	MI-14	January 3, 1935	5th term	
139	Chauncey W. Reed	R	IL-11	January 3, 1935	5th term	
140	John M. Robsion	R	KY-09	January 3, 1935; Previous service, 1919–1930.	6th term*	
141	Dewey Jackson Short	R	MO-07	January 3, 1935; Previous service, 1929–1931.	6th term*	
142	Joe Starnes	D	AL-05	January 3, 1935	5th term	Left the House in 1945.
143	Karl Stefan	R	NE-03	January 3, 1935	5th term	
144	John H. Tolan	D	CA-07	January 3, 1935	5th term	
145	B. Frank Whelchel	D	GA-09	January 3, 1935	5th term	Left the House in 1945.
146	Orville Zimmerman	D	MO-10	January 3, 1935	5th term	
147	Charles A. Halleck	R	IN-02	January 29, 1935	5th term	
148	Frank W. Boykin	D	AL-01	July 30, 1935	5th term	
149	William Bernard Barry	D	NY-02	November 5, 1935	5th term	
150	Edward W. Creal	D	KY-04	November 5, 1935	5th term	Died on October 13, 1943.
151	A. Leonard Allen	D	LA-08	January 3, 1937	4th term	
152	George J. Bates	R	MA-06	January 3, 1937	4th term	
153	Lyle Boren	D	OK-04	January 3, 1937	4th term	
154	Michael J. Bradley	D	PA-03	January 3, 1937	4th term	
155	Overton Brooks	D	LA-04	January 3, 1937	4th term	
156	William T. Byrne	D	NY-28	January 3, 1937	4th term	
157	Francis Case	R	SD-02	January 3, 1937	4th term	
158	Charles R. Clason	R	MA-02	January 3, 1937	4th term	
159	John M. Coffee	D	WA-06	January 3, 1937	4th term	
160	Fred J. Douglas	R	NY-33	January 3, 1937	4th term	Left the House in 1945.
161	Herman P. Eberharter	D	PA-31	January 3, 1937	4th term	
162	Noble Jones Gregory	D	KY-01	January 3, 1937	4th term	
163	Joe Hendricks	D	FL-05	January 3, 1937	4th term	
164	Edouard Izac	D	CA-23	January 3, 1937	4th term	
165	Pete Jarman	D	AL-06	January 3, 1937	4th term	
166	Eugene James Keogh	D	NY-09	January 3, 1937	4th term	
167	Michael J. Kirwan	D	OH-19	January 3, 1937	4th term	
168	Warren Magnuson	D	WA-01	January 3, 1937	4th term	Resigned on December 14, 1944.
169	Noah M. Mason	R	IL-12	January 3, 1937	4th term	
170	James P. McGranery	D	PA-02	January 3, 1937	4th term	Resigned on November 17, 1943.
171	John R. Murdock	D	AZ	January 3, 1937	4th term	
172	James F. O'Connor	D	MT-02	January 3, 1937	4th term	
173	Donald Lawrence O'Toole	D	NY-08	January 3, 1937	4th term	
174	Stephen Pace	D	GA-03	January 3, 1937	4th term	
175	William R. Poage	D	TX-11	January 3, 1937	4th term	
176	Edward Herbert Rees	R	KS-04	January 3, 1937	4th term	
177	Paul W. Shafer	R	MI-03	January 3, 1937	4th term	
178	Harry R. Sheppard	D	CA-21	January 3, 1937	4th term	
179	John Sparkman	D	AL-08	January 3, 1937	4th term	
180	Albert Thomas	D	TX-08	January 3, 1937	4th term	
181	J. Parnell Thomas	R	NJ-07	January 3, 1937	4th term	
182	Jerry Voorhis	D	CA-12	January 3, 1937	4th term	
183	Beverly M. Vincent	D	KY-02	March 2, 1937	4th term	Left the House in 1945.
184	Lyndon B. Johnson	D	TX-10	April 10, 1937	4th term	
185	Alfred J. Elliott	D	CA-10	May 4, 1937	4th term	
186	Richard M. Simpson	R	PA-18	May 11, 1937	4th term	
187	Ralph A. Gamble	R	NY-25	November 2, 1937	4th term	
188	Dave E. Satterfield Jr.	D	VA-03	November 2, 1937	4th term	
189	Joe B. Bates	D	KY-08	June 4, 1938	4th term	
190	George M. Grant	D	AL-02	June 14, 1938	4th term	
191	Herman Carl Andersen	R	MN-07	January 3, 1939	3rd term	
192	Jack Z. Anderson	R	CA-08	January 3, 1939	3rd term	
193	Homer D. Angell	R	OR-03	January 3, 1939	3rd term	
194	Lindley Beckworth	D	TX-03	January 3, 1939	3rd term	
195	George H. Bender	R	OH	January 3, 1939	3rd term	
196	William W. Blackney	R	MI-06	January 3, 1939; Previous service, 1935–1937.	4th term*	
197	Frederick Van Ness Bradley	R	MI-11	January 3, 1939	3rd term	
198	Clarence J. Brown	R	OH-07	January 3, 1939	3rd term	
199	Joseph R. Bryson	D	SC-04	January 3, 1939	3rd term	
200	William O. Burgin	D	NC-08	January 3, 1939	3rd term	
201	Pat Cannon	D	FL-04	January 3, 1939	3rd term	
202	Robert B. Chiperfield	R	IL-15	January 3, 1939	3rd term	
203	Cliff Clevenger	R	OH-05	January 3, 1939	3rd term	
204	Carl Curtis	R	NE-01	January 3, 1939	3rd term	
205	Carl T. Durham	D	NC-06	January 3, 1939	3rd term	
206	Thomas D'Alesandro Jr.	D	MD-03	January 3, 1939	3rd term	
207	Henry Dworshak	R	ID-02	January 3, 1939	3rd term	
208	Charles H. Elston	R	OH-01	January 3, 1939	3rd term	
209	Ivor D. Fenton	R	PA-13	January 3, 1939	3rd term	
210	Ezekiel C. Gathings	D	AR-01	January 3, 1939	3rd term	
211	Charles L. Gerlach	R	PA-09	January 3, 1939	3rd term	
212	George W. Gillie	R	IN-04	January 3, 1939	3rd term	
213	Albert A. Gore Sr.	D	TN-04	January 3, 1939	3rd term	Resigned on December 4, 1944.
214	Ed Gossett	D	TX-13	January 3, 1939	3rd term	
215	Louis E. Graham	R	PA-26	January 3, 1939	3rd term	
216	Robert A. Grant	R	IN-03	January 3, 1939	3rd term	
217	Forest Harness	R	IN-05	January 3, 1939	3rd term	
218	Leonard W. Hall	R	NY-01	January 3, 1939	3rd term	
219	Butler B. Hare	D	SC-03	January 3, 1939; Previous service, 1925–1933.	7th term*	
220	William E. Hess	R	OH-02	January 3, 1939; Previous service, 1929–1937.	7th term*	
221	John Carl Hinshaw	R	CA-20	January 3, 1939	3rd term	
222	Ben F. Jensen	R	IA-07	January 3, 1939	3rd term	
223	Anton J. Johnson	R	IL-14	January 3, 1939	3rd term	
224	Noble J. Johnson	R	IN-06	January 3, 1939; Previous service, 1925–1931.	7th term*	
225	Robert Franklin Jones	R	OH-04	January 3, 1939	3rd term	
226	Robert Kean	R	NJ-12	January 3, 1939	3rd term	
227	Frank Bateman Keefe	R	WI-06	January 3, 1939	3rd term	
228	Paul J. Kilday	D	TX-20	January 3, 1939	3rd term	
229	John C. Kunkel	R	PA-19	January 3, 1939	3rd term	
230	Gerald W. Landis	R	IN-07	January 3, 1939	3rd term	
231	Karl M. LeCompte	R	IA-04	January 3, 1939	3rd term	
232	Vito Marcantonio	ALP	NY-20	January 3, 1939; Previous service, 1935–1937.	4th term*	
233	Thomas E. Martin	R	IA-01	January 3, 1939	3rd term	
234	John L. McMillan	D	SC-06	January 3, 1939	3rd term	
235	Wilbur Mills	D	AR-02	January 3, 1939	3rd term	
236	Mike Monroney	D	OK-05	January 3, 1939	3rd term	
237	Karl E. Mundt	R	SD-01	January 3, 1939	3rd term	
238	Reid F. Murray	R	WI-07	January 3, 1939	3rd term	
239	Francis J. Myers	D	PA-06	January 3, 1939	3rd term	Left the House in 1945.
240	William F. Norrell	D	AR-06	January 3, 1939	3rd term	
241	Joseph J. O'Brien	R	NY-38	January 3, 1939	3rd term	Left the House in 1945.
242	William Alvin Pittenger	R	MN-08	January 3, 1939; Previous service, 1929–1933 and 1935–1937.	6th term**	
243	Robert L. Rodgers	R	PA-29	January 3, 1939	3rd term	
244	Frederick Cleveland Smith	R	OH-08	January 3, 1939	3rd term	
245	Foster Waterman Stearns	R	NH-02	January 3, 1939	3rd term	Left the House in 1945.
246	Raymond S. Springer	R	IN-10	January 3, 1939	3rd term	
247	Jessie Sumner	R	IL-18	January 3, 1939	3rd term	
248	Henry O. Talle	R	IA-02	January 3, 1939	3rd term	
249	Harve Tibbott	R	PA-27	January 3, 1939	3rd term	
250	John Martin Vorys	R	OH-12	January 3, 1939	3rd term	
251	William H. Wheat	R	IL-19	January 3, 1939	3rd term	Died on January 16, 1944.
252	Thomas Daniel Winter	R	KS-03	January 3, 1939	3rd term	
253	James E. Van Zandt	R	PA-23	January 3, 1939	3rd term	Resigned on September 24, 1943.
254	Lansdale Ghiselin Sasscer	D	MD-05	February 3, 1939	3rd term	
255	W. Wirt Courtney	D	TN-07	May 11, 1939	3rd term	
256	David Jenkins Ward	D	MD-01	June 8, 1939	3rd term	Left the House in 1945.
257	Albert Sidney Camp	D	GA-04	August 1, 1939	3rd term	
258	William Fadjo Cravens	D	AR-04	September 12, 1939	3rd term	
259	Estes Kefauver	D	TN-03	September 13, 1939	3rd term	
260	Edwin Arthur Hall	R	NY-34	November 7, 1939	3rd term	
261	John E. Sheridan	D	PA-04	November 7, 1939	3rd term	
262	John Jennings	R	TN-02	December 30, 1939	3rd term	
263	Clarence E. Kilburn	R	NY-31	February 13, 1940	3rd term	
264	Clifford Davis	D	TN-10	February 14, 1940	3rd term	
265	Bartel J. Jonkman	R	MI-05	February 19, 1940	3rd term	
266	Walter A. Lynch	D	NY-22	February 20, 1940	3rd term	
267	Frances P. Bolton	R	OH-22	February 27, 1940	3rd term	
268	J. Harry McGregor	R	OH-17	February 27, 1940	3rd term	
269	Margaret Chase Smith	R	ME-02	June 3, 1940	3rd term	
270	Herbert Covington Bonner	D	NC-01	November 5, 1940	3rd term	
271	Clinton Presba Anderson	D	NM	January 3, 1941	2nd term	
272	C. W. Bishop	R	IL-25	January 3, 1941	2nd term	
273	Gordon Canfield	R	NJ-08	January 3, 1941	2nd term	
274	Louis Capozzoli	D	NY-13	January 3, 1941	2nd term	Left the House in 1945.
275	John Chenoweth	R	CO-03	January 3, 1941	2nd term	
276	Paul Cunningham	R	IA-05	January 3, 1941	2nd term	
277	Stephen A. Day	R	IL	January 3, 1941	2nd term	Left the House in 1945.
278	Charles S. Dewey	R	IL-09	January 3, 1941	2nd term	Left the House in 1945.
279	James R. Domengeaux	D	LA-03	January 3, 1941	2nd term	Resigned on April 15, 1944. Returned to the House on November 7, 1944.
280	Frank Fellows	R	ME-03	January 3, 1941	2nd term	
281	John E. Fogarty	D	RI-02	January 3, 1941	2nd term	Resigned on December 7, 1944.
282	Aime Forand	D	RI-01	January 3, 1941; Previous service, 1937–1939.	3rd term*	
283	Richard Pillsbury Gale	R	MN-03	January 3, 1941	2nd term	Left the House in 1945.
284	John S. Gibson	D	GA-08	January 3, 1941	2nd term	
285	Walter K. Granger	D	UT-01	January 3, 1941	2nd term	
286	Oren Harris	D	AR-07	January 3, 1941	2nd term	
287	Felix Edward Hébert	D	LA-01	January 3, 1941	2nd term	
288	James J. Heffernan	D	NY-05	January 3, 1941	2nd term	
289	James V. Heidinger	R	IL-24	January 3, 1941	2nd term	
290	William S. Hill	R	CO-02	January 3, 1941	2nd term	
291	George Evan Howell	R	IL-21	January 3, 1941	2nd term	
292	Henry M. Jackson	D	WA-02	January 3, 1941	2nd term	
293	William Ward Johnson	R	CA-18	January 3, 1941	2nd term	Left the House in 1945.
294	Augustine B. Kelley	D	PA-28	January 3, 1941	2nd term	
295	George D. O'Brien	D	MI-13	January 3, 1941; Previous service, 1937–1939.	3rd term*	
296	Joseph O'Hara	R	MN-02	January 3, 1941	2nd term	
297	Walter C. Ploeser	R	MO-12	January 3, 1941	2nd term	
298	Percy Priest	D	TN-06	January 3, 1941	2nd term	
299	L. Mendel Rivers	D	SC-01	January 3, 1941	2nd term	
300	Ross Rizley	R	OK-08	January 3, 1941	2nd term	
301	Thomas Rolph	R	CA-04	January 3, 1941	2nd term	Left the House in 1945.
302	Sam M. Russell	D	TX-17	January 3, 1941	2nd term	
303	Harry Sauthoff	P	WI-02	January 3, 1941; Previous service, 1935–1939.	4th term*	Left the House in 1945.
304	Thomas E. Scanlon	D	PA-16	January 3, 1941	2nd term	Left the House in 1945.
305	Hugh Scott	R	PA-07	January 3, 1941	2nd term	Left the House in 1945.
306	Robert L. F. Sikes	D	FL-03	January 3, 1941	2nd term	Resigned on October 19, 1944.
307	William H. Stevenson	R	WI-03	January 3, 1941	2nd term	
308	Thaddeus Wasielewski	D	WI-04	January 3, 1941	2nd term	
309	Samuel A. Weiss	D	PA-30	January 3, 1941	2nd term	
310	Elmer H. Wene	D	NJ-02	January 3, 1941; Previous service, 1937–1939.	3rd term*	Left the House in 1945.
311	Earl Wilson	R	IN-09	January 3, 1941	2nd term	
312	Eugene Worley	D	TX-18	January 3, 1941	2nd term	
313	James A. Wright	D	PA-32	January 3, 1941	2nd term	Left the House in 1945.
314	Joseph C. Baldwin	R	NY-17	March 11, 1941	2nd term	
315	Victor Wickersham	D	OK-07	April 1, 1941	2nd term	
316	Winder R. Harris	D	VA-02	April 8, 1941	2nd term	Resigned on September 15, 1944.
317	John Cornelius Butler	R	NY-42	April 22, 1941	2nd term	
318	John Hamlin Folger	D	NC-05	June 14, 1941	2nd term	
319	Carter Manasco	D	AL-07	June 24, 1941	2nd term	
320	Arthur G. Klein	D	NY-14	July 29, 1941	2nd term	Left the House in 1945.
321	Lawrence H. Smith	R	WI-01	August 29, 1941	2nd term	
322	Wilson D. Gillette	R	PA-15	November 4, 1941	2nd term	
323	Jamie Whitten	D	MS-02	November 4, 1941	2nd term	
324	Robert F. Rockwell	R	CO-04	December 9, 1941	2nd term	
325	Thomas J. Lane	D	MA-07	December 30, 1941	2nd term	
326	Joseph E. Talbot	R	CT-05	January 20, 1942	2nd term	
327	Thomas B. Miller	R	PA-12	May 19, 1942	2nd term	Left the House in 1945.
328	Cecil R. King	D	CA-17	August 25, 1942	2nd term	
329	Thomas Abernethy	D	MS-04	January 3, 1943	1st term	
330	Samuel W. Arnold	R	MO-01	January 3, 1943	1st term	
331	James C. Auchincloss	R	NJ-03	January 3, 1943	1st term	
332	Harry Streett Baldwin	D	MD-02	January 3, 1943	1st term	
333	Frank A. Barrett	R	WY	January 3, 1943	1st term	
334	James Glenn Beall	R	MD-06	January 3, 1943	1st term	
335	John B. Bennett	R	MI-12	January 3, 1943	1st term	Left the House in 1945.
336	Walter E. Brehm	R	OH-11	January 3, 1943	1st term	
337	Howard Buffett	R	NE-02	January 3, 1943	1st term	
338	Thomas F. Burchill	D	NY-15	January 3, 1943	1st term	Left the House in 1945.
339	Fred E. Busbey	R	IL-03	January 3, 1943	1st term	Left the House in 1945.
340	Henderson H. Carson	R	OH-16	January 3, 1943	1st term	Left the House in 1945.
341	Ralph E. Church	R	IL-10	January 3, 1943; Previous service, 1935–1941.	4th term*	
342	William Clay Cole	R	MO-03	January 3, 1943	1st term	
343	Ranulf Compton	R	CT-03	January 3, 1943	1st term	Left the House in 1945.
344	James Michael Curley	D	MA-11	January 3, 1943; Previous service, 1911–1914.	3rd term*	
345	William L. Dawson	D	IL-01	January 3, 1943	1st term	
346	LaVern Dilweg	D	WI-08	January 3, 1943	1st term	Left the House in 1945.
347	Daniel Ellison	R	MD-04	January 3, 1943	1st term	Left the House in 1945.
348	Hubert S. Ellis	R	WV-04	January 3, 1943	1st term	
349	Harris Ellsworth	R	OR-04	January 3, 1943	1st term	
350	William P. Elmer	R	MO-08	January 3, 1943	1st term	Left the House in 1945.
351	James H. Fay	D	NY-16	January 3, 1943; Previous service, 1939–1941.	2nd term*	Left the House in 1945.
352	Michael A. Feighan	D	OH-20	January 3, 1943	1st term	
353	Antonio M. Fernández	D	NM	January 3, 1943	1st term	
354	O. C. Fisher	D	TX-21	January 3, 1943	1st term	
355	J. William Fulbright	D	AR-03	January 3, 1943	1st term	Left the House in 1945.
356	Grant Furlong	D	PA-25	January 3, 1943	1st term	Left the House in 1945.
357	James A. Gallagher	R	PA-01	January 3, 1943	1st term	Left the House in 1945.
358	Leon H. Gavin	R	PA-20	January 3, 1943	1st term	
359	Angier Goodwin	R	MA-08	January 3, 1943	1st term	
360	Thomas S. Gordon	D	IL-08	January 3, 1943	1st term	
361	Martin Gorski	D	IL-04	January 3, 1943	1st term	
362	Percy W. Griffiths	R	OH-15	January 3, 1943	1st term	
363	Chester H. Gross	R	PA-22	January 3, 1943; Previous service, 1939–1941.	2nd term*	
364	Harold Hagen	R	MN-09	January 3, 1943	1st term	
365	Robert Hale	R	ME-01	January 3, 1943	1st term	
366	Richard F. Harless	D	AZ	January 3, 1943	1st term	
367	Brooks Hays	D	AR-05	January 3, 1943	1st term	
368	Christian Herter	R	MA-10	January 3, 1943	1st term	
369	Daniel K. Hoch	D	PA-14	January 3, 1943	1st term	
370	Charles B. Hoeven	R	IA-08	January 3, 1943	1st term	
371	Chester E. Holifield	D	CA-19	January 3, 1943	1st term	
372	Hal Holmes	R	WA-04	January 3, 1943	1st term	
373	Walt Horan	R	WA-05	January 3, 1943	1st term	
374	Harry P. Jeffrey	R	OH-03	January 3, 1943	1st term	Left the House in 1945.
375	Calvin D. Johnson	R	IL-22	January 3, 1943	1st term	Left the House in 1945.
376	Justin L. Johnson	R	CA-03	January 3, 1943	1st term	
377	Walter Judd	R	MN-05	January 3, 1943	1st term	
378	Bernard W. Kearney	R	NY-30	January 3, 1943	1st term	
379	Charles M. La Follette	R	IN-08	January 3, 1943	1st term	
380	Henry D. Larcade Jr.	D	LA-07	January 3, 1943	1st term	
381	William Lemke	R	ND	January 3, 1943; Previous service, 1933–1941.	6th term*	
382	Jay Le Fevre	R	NY-27	January 3, 1943	1st term	
383	Earl R. Lewis	R	OH-18	January 3, 1943; Previous service, 1939–1941.	2nd term*	
384	Clare Boothe Luce	R	CT-04	January 3, 1943	1st term	
385	Ray Madden	D	IN-01	January 3, 1943	1st term	
386	Paul H. Maloney	D	LA-02	January 3, 1943; Previous service, 1931–1940.	6th term*	
387	Mike Mansfield	D	MT-01	January 3, 1943	1st term	
388	Jim Nance McCord	D	TN-05	January 3, 1943	1st term	Left the House in 1945.
389	Edward Oscar McCowen	R	OH-06	January 3, 1943	1st term	
390	Charles E. McKenzie	D	LA-05	January 3, 1943	1st term	
391	Howard J. McMurray	D	WI-05	January 3, 1943	1st term	Left the House in 1945.
392	John D. McWilliams	R	CT-02	January 3, 1943	1st term	Left the House in 1945.
393	Chester Earl Merrow	R	NH-01	January 3, 1943	1st term	
394	Arthur L. Miller	R	NE-04	January 3, 1943	1st term	
395	Louis E. Miller	R	MO-11	January 3, 1943	1st term	Left the House in 1945.
396	William J. Miller	R	CT-01	January 3, 1943; Previous service, 1939–1941.	2nd term*	Left the House in 1945.
397	B. J. Monkiewicz	R	CT	January 3, 1943; Previous service, 1939–1941.	2nd term*	Left the House in 1945.
398	Cameron Morrison	D	NC-10	January 3, 1943	1st term	Left the House in 1945.
399	James H. Morrison	D	LA-06	January 3, 1943	1st term	
400	Joseph Mruk	R	NY-41	January 3, 1943	1st term	Left the House in 1945.
401	John W. Murphy	D	PA-11	January 3, 1943	1st term	
402	Tom J. Murray	D	TN-08	January 3, 1943	1st term	
403	John P. Newsome	D	AL-09	January 3, 1943	1st term	Left the House in 1945.
404	Fred B. Norman	R	WA-03	January 3, 1943	1st term	Left the House in 1945.
405	Thomas J. O'Brien	D	IL-06	January 3, 1943; Previous service, 1933–1939.	4th term*	
406	Alvin O'Konski	R	WI-10	January 3, 1943	1st term	
407	George E. Outland	D	CA-11	January 3, 1943	1st term	
408	Philip J. Philbin	D	MA-03	January 3, 1943	1st term	
409	John J. Phillips	R	CA-22	January 3, 1943	1st term	
410	Norris Poulson	R	CA-13	January 3, 1943	1st term	Left the House in 1945.
411	C. Frederick Pracht	R	PA-05	January 3, 1943	1st term	Left the House in 1945.
412	Emory H. Price	D	FL-02	January 3, 1943	1st term	
413	Homer A. Ramey	R	OH-09	January 3, 1943	1st term	
414	Will Rogers Jr.	D	CA-16	January 3, 1943	1st term	Resigned on May 23, 1944.
415	Edward G. Rohrbough	R	WV-03	January 3, 1943	1st term	Left the House in 1945.
416	William A. Rowan	D	IL-02	January 3, 1943	1st term	
417	Edmund Rowe	R	OH-14	January 3, 1943	1st term	Left the House in 1945.
418	George G. Sadowski	D	MI-01	January 3, 1943; Previous service, 1933–1939.	4th term*	
419	A. C. Schiffler	R	WV-01	January 3, 1943; Previous service, 1939–1941.	2nd term*	Left the House in 1945.
420	Max Schwabe	R	MO-02	January 3, 1943	1st term	
421	Sid Simpson	R	IL-20	January 3, 1943	1st term	
422	Roger C. Slaughter	D	MO-05	January 3, 1943	1st term	
423	Winifred C. Stanley	R	NY	January 3, 1943	1st term	Left the House in 1945.
424	Paul Stewart	D	OK-03	January 3, 1943	1st term	
425	Lowell Stockman	R	OR-02	January 3, 1943	1st term	
426	Maurice J. Sullivan	D	NV	January 3, 1943	1st term	Left the House in 1945.
427	Frank Sundstrom	R	NJ-11	January 3, 1943	1st term	
428	Dean P. Taylor	R	NY-29	January 3, 1943	1st term	
429	Harry Lancaster Towe	R	NJ-09	January 3, 1943	1st term	
430	William I. Troutman	R	PA	January 3, 1943	1st term	Resigned on January 2, 1945.
431	Charles W. Vursell	R	IL-23	January 3, 1943	1st term	
432	Alvin F. Weichel	R	OH-13	January 3, 1943	1st term	
433	Earle D. Willey	R	DE	January 3, 1943	1st term	Left the House in 1945.
434	W. Arthur Winstead	D	MS-05	January 3, 1943	1st term	
	Marion T. Bennett	R	MO-06	January 12, 1943	1st term	
	Clair Engle	D	CA-02	August 31, 1943	1st term	
	Errett P. Scrivner	R	KS-02	September 14, 1943	1st term	
	D. Emmert Brumbaugh	R	PA-23	November 2, 1943	1st term	
	Hadwen C. Fuller	R	NY-32	November 2, 1943	1st term	
	Chester O. Carrier	R	KY-04	November 30, 1943	1st term	Left the House in 1945.
	Joseph Marmaduke Pratt	R	PA-02	January 18, 1944	1st term	Left the House in 1945.
	Samuel K. McConnell Jr.	R	PA-17	January 18, 1944	1st term	
	James H. Torrens	D	NY-21	February 29, 1944	1st term	
	Dean M. Gillespie	R	CO-01	March 7, 1944	1st term	
	George W. Andrews	D	AL-03	March 14, 1944	1st term	
	William G. Stigler	D	OK-02	March 28, 1944	1st term	
	Ellsworth B. Buck	R	NY-11	June 6, 1944	1st term	
	John J. Rooney	D	NY-04	June 6, 1944	1st term	
	Rolla C. McMillen	R	IL-19	June 13, 1944	1st term	
	Ralph Hunter Daughton	D	VA-02	November 7, 1944	1st term	
	Willa L. Fulmer	D	SC-02	November 7, 1944	1st term	Left the House in 1945.

== Delegates ==
Rank	Delegate	Party	District	Seniority date (Previous service, if any)	No.# of term(s)	Notes
1	Anthony Dimond	D	AK	March 4, 1933	6th term	
2	Joaquin Miguel Elizalde	Lib	PHL	September 29, 1938	4th term	
3	Bolívar Pagán	Socialist	PR	December 26, 1939	3rd term	
4	Joseph Rider Farrington	R	HI	January 3, 1943	1st term	
	Carlos P. Romulo	Lib	PHL	August 10, 1944	1st term	

== See also ==
- 78th United States Congress
- List of United States congressional districts
- List of United States senators in the 78th Congress
