= Fenerty =

Fenerty is a surname. Notable people with the surname include:

- Gill Fenerty (born 1963), American gridiron football player
- Clare G. Fenerty (1895–1952), American politician
- Charles Fenerty (1821–1892), Canadian inventor and poet
