= Alfred Waldron =

Alfred Waldron may refer to:

- Alfred Waldron (footballer) (1857–1929), Australian rules footballer and cricketer
- Alfred M. Waldron (1865–1952), American Republican politician

== See also ==
- Alfred Waldron Smithers (1850–1924), British financier and parliamentarian
