= William A. Barrett =

American politician (1896–1976)

William A. "Bill" Barrett
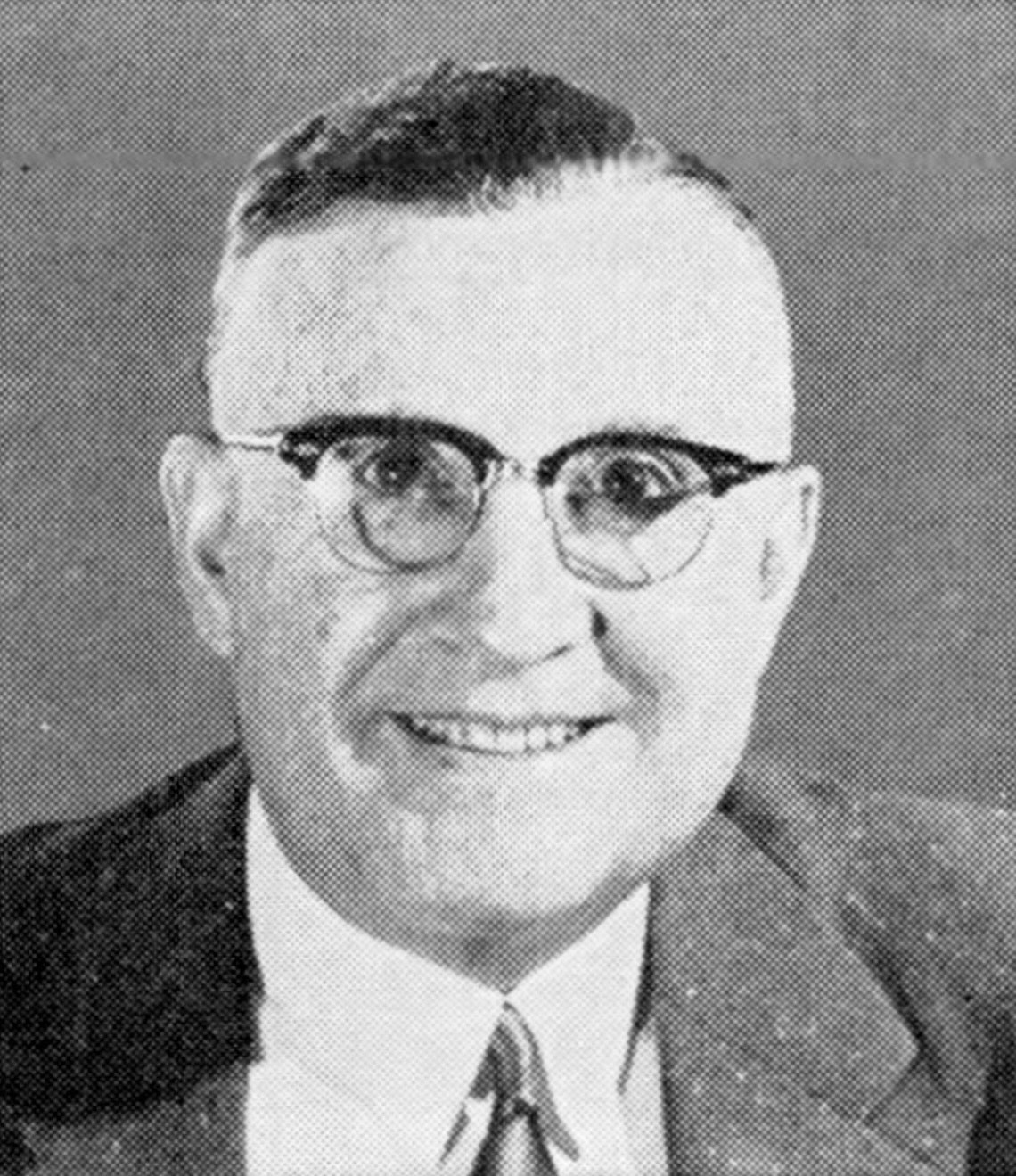

Member of the U.S. House of Representatives from Pennsylvania's 1st district
- In office January 3, 1949 – April 12, 1976
- Preceded by: James Gallagher
- Succeeded by: Ozzie Myers
- In office January 3, 1945 – January 3, 1947
- Preceded by: James Gallagher
- Succeeded by: James Gallagher

Personal details
- Born: William Aloysius Barrett; August 14, 1896 Philadelphia, Pennsylvania, US
- Died: April 12, 1976 (aged 79) Philadelphia, Pennsylvania, US
- Resting place: Holy Cross Cemetery, Yeadon, Pennsylvania
- Party: Democratic
- Spouse: Rose Timmins (died 1964)
- Children: Rosemary; Gertrude; Margaret
- Education: Brown Preparatory School; St. Joseph's College; South Jersey Law School
- Occupation: Politician; lawyer; boilermaker
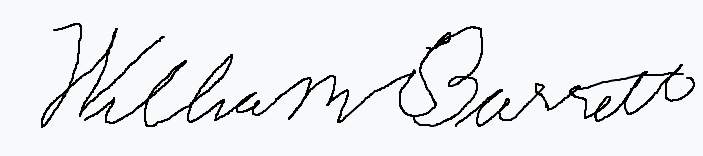
- Signature

William Aloysius Barrett (August 14, 1896 – April 12, 1976) was an American lawyer, politician, and member of the Democratic Party who served in the United States House of Representatives, representing Pennsylvania's South Philadelphia-based 1st district from 1945 to 1947 and again from 1949 until his death in 1976.

== Early life ==
William Aloysius Barrett was born on August 14, 1896, in Philadelphia, Pennsylvania, the son of Irish immigrants. He had thirteen siblings, and his father died when he was two years old, forcing his mother to scrub floors to support the family. Barrett initially went to school at Thomas Parochial School, but he left and sought work to support the family. He soon found employment as an apprentice boilermaker and welder at the Atlantic Refining Company's plant at Point Breeze, carrying a union card for the Boilermakers' Union until his death. Later, he resumed his education, attending the Brown Preparatory School in Philadelphia and St. Joseph's College. He subsequently studied law at the South Jersey Law School in Camden, New Jersey, before working in the real estate business. However, he found the most success in running a taproom.

Barrett married Rose Timmins, four years his junior, and the couple had three children: Rosemary in 1924, and Gertrude in 1925 and Margaret in 1928. His wife, Rose, died in 1964. By the time of Barrett's death in 1976, he had fifteen grandchildren. In his first forays into local politics, Barrett served on the Philadelphia Board of Mercantile Appraisers and the Democratic City Committee, but lost two Philadelphia City Council races in 1935 and 1939. However, Barrett persisted, serving as a legislative aide to Congressman James P. McGranery until McGranery resigned to become an assistant to the Attorney General in 1943. Barrett ran in the January 1944 special election to succeed McGranery, but lost to Republican Joseph M. Pratt.

== Congress ==
Barrett ran for Congress again in the 1944 November election, defeating incumbent Republican James A. Gallagher, but lost to him in a rematch during the Republican sweep of Congress two years later. Despite his loss, Barrett was dead set on returning to Congress, succeeding in November of 1948. He won re-election thirteen subsequent times.

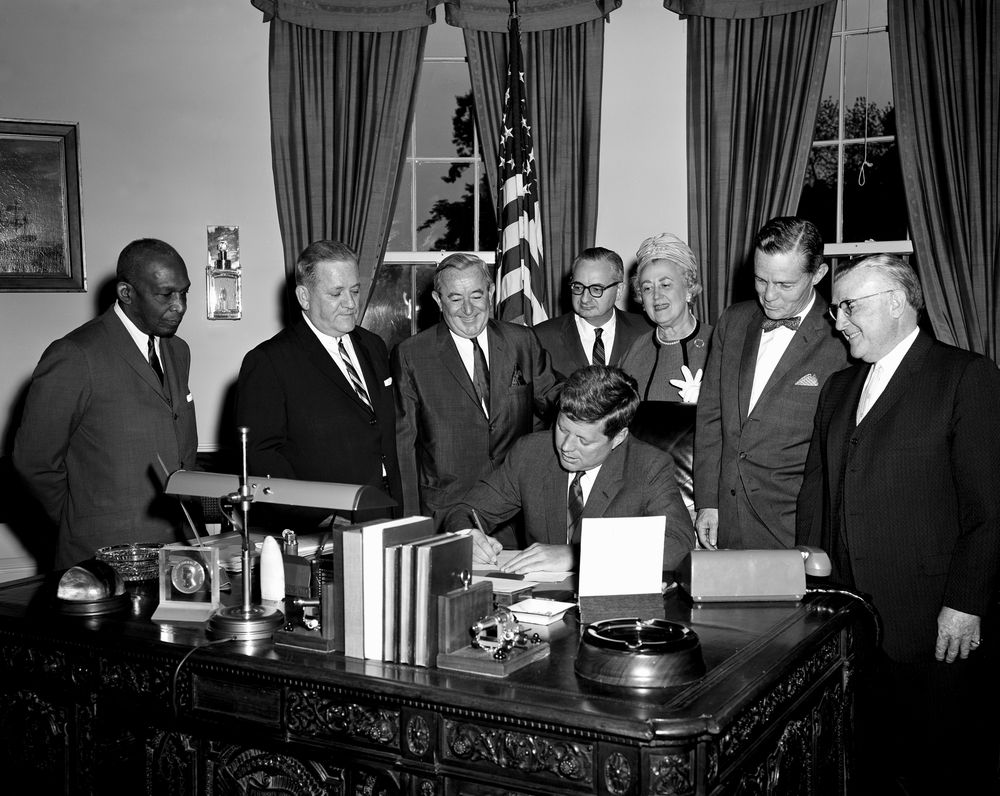
U.S. President John F. Kennedy meets with Barrett (furthest right) and other members of Pennsylvania's congressional delegation, 1961

In the House, Barrett quickly established himself as a mainstream liberal Democrat. However, the peak of his legislative career started in 1965, when he became the chairman of the Housing Subcommittee of the Banking, Currency and Housing, a position he excelled in due to his background in real estate and housing. Serving in this capacity, Barrett was instrumental in passing the Housing and Urban Development Acts of 1965, 1968, 1969, and 1970, the Emergency Home Finance Act of 1970, the Housing and Community Development Act of 1974 and many more pieces of significant housing legislation. He was also crucial in passing the Lead-Based Paint Poisoning Prevention Act of 1970 and the Federal Disaster Prevention Act of 1973. By the time of his death in 1976, he was also the ranking member of the larger Banking, Currency, and Housing committee, one of the most powerful committees in the House. According to fellow Pennsylvania congressman William J. Green, "The legislation for which Bill Barrett was responsible during his years as chairman of [the Housing Subcommittee on Banking, Currency and Housing] would form a proud legacy for any 10 Members of Congress." Barrett was also a staunch supporter of civil rights, voting for the 1957, 1960, 1964, and 1968 Civil Rights Acts. Barrett also introduced legislation to designate the birthday of Martin Luther King Jr. as a legal public holiday in January 1973, thirteen years before its first official observance in 1986. Due to his Catholic faith, Barrett was a strong opponent of abortion, unsuccessfully introducing a constitutional amendment to outlaw it in 1975.

During his tenure in Congress, he also acquired a reputation for being extremely devoted to his constituents. Most days, after working on Capitol Hill, he would fly back to Philadelphia to see his constituents in the evening, the only congressman to do so. "His interest in serving his constituents was unmatched," said Florida congressman Bob Sikes about Barrett. "Few people have worked harder for the people they represent." Russell W. Nigro, a Republican opponent of Barrett's in 1974, blamed his loss on all the favors Barrett did for various voters over the years. "He just called in a lot of IOUs," explained Nigro shortly after Barrett's death. "There aren't many people in the First Congressional District who aren't related to, or at least a close friend of, someone who has been helped out by Bill Barrett." Barrett himself, however, simply maintained: "I do this because I love people." But his devotion to his constituents sometimes earned him criticism. Ralph Nader's Congressional Study Group criticized Barrett for his provincialism, characterizing him as a "districter" who overlooked the affairs of state in concern for his district. Barrett embraced their description of him, explaining "I am very much pleased with what the book says. It hits on my activity most accurately. It is what my district needs. This is a procedure I've been following ever since I've been in public life."

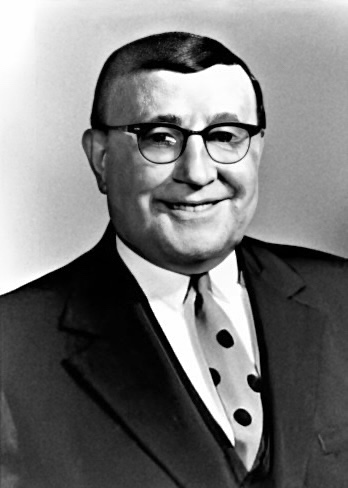
Portrait of Barrett taken later in his congressional career

In office, Barrett built his own political organization in Philadelphia politics. Local Republicans tried to defeat him, but never achieved success, so much so that it became a joke that the Republican Party had to "scour the voter rolls trying to find someone with the courage to run against him." After Barrett's death, rival ward leader Bill Black explained how influential he was, commenting "When I found out that a lot of my Republican committeemen had jobs through the Democratic party, then I knew why Bill Barrett was a giant in politics."

During the 1972 Democratic National Convention, one convention delegate voted for Barrett to be the Democratic vice-presidential nominee alongside Senator George McGovern, despite Barrett never seeking the office. Thomas Eagleton was nominated instead, winning 1,742 delegates.

As Barrett's time in office grew longer, the demographics of South Philadelphia neighborhoods changed. At the time of his death, his house was the only one on his block occupied by a white family. Even so, Barrett remained overwhelmingly popular with his constituents, never once falling below 60% of the vote in his re-election bids after 1950, sometimes winning well over 70% of the vote.

== Death ==
Barrett died from pneumonia at the Philadelphia Naval Hospital in Philadelphia, Pennsylvania on April 12, 1976, at age 79.

Barrett was eulogized greatly by his colleagues on the House floor immediately after his death. Congressman Robert Giaimo characterized Barrett as "a compassionate man, gentle and kind, sensitive to the feelings of others, a man who had a firm faith in the essential goodness of his fellow man," while Minnesota Senator and former Vice President Hubert H. Humphrey also applauded Barrett's service, stating that "the House of Representatives – and indeed this entire Congress – has lost one of its most outstanding Members." House Speaker Carl Albert also praised Barrett highly, stating that "No problem was too small, none too difficult to resolve, for this dedicated and diligent servant of the people."

Barrett's funeral was held on April 14, 1976, at the Philadelphia Cathedral of Saints Peter and Paul. He was interred at Holy Cross Cemetery in Yeadon, Pennsylvania.

At the time of his death, Barrett had already announced his intention to run for reelection. Fifteen days after his death, Philadelphia voters renominated him posthumously. He was replaced on the ballot by state representative Ozzie Myers.

== Electoral history ==
Pennsylvania's 2nd congressional district: January 1944 special election
Year	Subject	Party	Votes	%	Opponent	Party	Votes	%
1944	William A. Barrett	Democratic	19,168	43.41	Joseph M. Pratt	Republican	24,991	56.59

Pennsylvania's 1st congressional district: Results 1944-1974
Year	Subject	Party	Votes	%	Opponent	Party	Votes	%
1944	William A. Barrett	Democratic	73,289	58.42	James A. Gallagher (inc.)	Republican	52,159	41.58
1946	William A. Barrett (inc.)	Democratic	52,593	42.66	James A. Gallagher	Republican	70,680	57.34
1948	William A. Barrett	Democratic	70,165	53.43	John De Niro	Republican	61,165	46.57
1950	William A. Barrett (inc.)	Democratic	69,300	53.77	Robert M. Sebastian	Republican	59,593	46.23
1952	William A. Barrett (inc.)	Democratic	89,879	68.18	James Iannucci	Republican	41,948	31.82
1954	William A. Barrett (inc.)	Democratic	68,531	61.50	Joseph A. Graham	Republican	42,893	38.50
1956	William A. Barrett (inc.)	Democratic	74,511	62.70	A.J. Cammarota	Republican	44,333	37.30
1958	William A. Barrett (inc.)	Democratic	67,531	64.69	Gerard Iannelli	Republican	36,854	35.31
1960	William A. Barrett (inc.)	Democratic	88,505	76.89	Michael Grasso Jr.	Republican	26,601	23.11
1962	William A. Barrett (inc.)	Democratic	102,722	63.54	Winifred H. Malinowski	Republican	58,953	36.46
1964	William A. Barrett (inc.)	Democratic	129,471	71.83	Alvin J. Bello	Republican	50,780	28.17
1966	William A. Barrett (inc.)	Democratic	90,100	66.07	Beatrice K. Chernock	Republican	46,280	33.93
1968	William A. Barrett (inc.)	Democratic	113,696	74.74	Leslie J. Carson, Jr	Republican	38,432	25.26
1970	William A. Barrett (inc.)	Democratic	79,425	69.22	Joseph S. Ziccardi	Republican	34,649	30.20
1972	William A. Barrett (inc.)	Democratic	118,953	66.11	Gus A. Pedicone	Republican	59,807	33.24
1974	William A. Barrett (inc.)	Democratic	96,988	75.83	Russell M. Nigro	Republican	29,772	23.28

== See also ==
- List of members of the United States Congress who died in office (1950–1999)

== Sources ==
- United States Congress. "William A. Barrett (id: B000178)". Biographical Directory of the United States Congress.
- The Political Graveyard
- GovTrack
- Newspapers.com

U.S. House of Representatives
Preceded by James Gallagher	Member of the U.S. House of Representatives from Pennsylvania's 1st congressional district 1945–1947	Succeeded by James Gallagher
Preceded by James Gallagher	Member of the U.S. House of Representatives from Pennsylvania's 1st congressional district 1949–1976	Succeeded by Ozzie Myers
