= Joseph Pratt =

Joseph Pratt may refer to:

- Joseph Marmaduke Pratt (1891–1946), American politician
- Joseph Gaither Pratt (1910–1979), American parapsychologist

== See also ==
- Harcourt Joseph Pratt (1866–1934), American politician
