= William H. Wilson =

American politician (1877–1937)

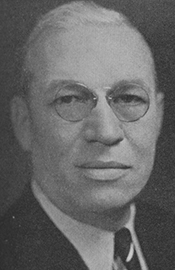

Member of the U.S. House of Representatives from Pennsylvania's 2nd district
- In office January 3, 1935 – January 3, 1937
- Preceded by: James M. Beck
- Succeeded by: James P. McGranery

Member of the Pennsylvania House of Representatives from the 5th Philadelphia County district
- In office January 6, 1913 – December 28, 1915
- Preceded by: Fredrick E. Keene
- Succeeded by: Edward W. Wells

Philadelphia Director of Public Safety
- In office 1916 – 1920

Personal details
- Born: William Henry Wilson; December 6, 1877 Philadelphia, Pennsylvania, U.S.
- Died: August 11, 1937 (aged 59) Santa Barbara, California, U.S.
- Resting place: Forest Lawn Memorial Park, Glendale, California
- Party: Republican
- Spouse: Florence Klauder (m. 1902)
- Children: Dorthea (born 1905)
- Education: University of Pennsylvania
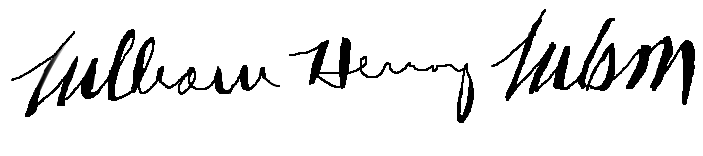
- Signature

William Henry Wilson (December 6, 1877 – August 11, 1937) was a Republican lawyer and member of the United States House of Representatives from Pennsylvania.

== Early life and career ==
William H. Wilson was born in Philadelphia, Pennsylvania on December 6, 1877. He graduated from the law department of the University of Pennsylvania in 1898 and was subsequently admitted to the bar in 1899. Wilson's first foray into politics was his tenure as assistant city solicitor from 1900 to 1909. He was then elected to two terms in the Pennsylvania House of Representatives and served from 1913 until his resignation on December 28, 1915. He served as director of public safety in Philadelphia from 1916 to 1920.

Wilson married Florence Klauder in 1902, and they had their only child, Dorthea, in 1905.

By 1930, Wilson had moved to Atlantic City, New Jersey with his wife and daughter. However, he moved back to Philadelphia and then ran for Congress in 1934.

== Congress ==
Wilson was elected to Congress in 1934, defeating Democrat James P. McGranery. The seat was open because its previous representative, Republican James M. Beck, resigned in protest of the New Deal. However, two years later, McGranery ran again and defeated Wilson, riding off the coattails of the very popular Franklin D. Roosevelt.

In Congress, Wilson cast 173 votes. During those votes, Wilson sided with his party 91 percent of the time, noticeably higher than his party's average during that Congress of 87 percent. He was rated as more conservative than 96 percent of the 74th Congress at-large, and more conservative than 87 percent of fellow Republicans in the House. Despite his conservatism, he voted for the Social Security Act of 1935, likely the most consequential vote of his legislative career.

Wilson had one committee assignment during his term, the House Committee on Coinage, Weights, and Measures.

== Later life and death ==
After leaving Congress in 1937, Wilson returned to practicing law. Later that year, he moved to Montecito, California, where he planned to build a new home. However, before the house was built, he had a sudden heart attack, dying at age 59.

Wilson was interred at Forest Lawn Memorial Park in Glendale, California.

== Electoral history ==
Pennsylvania's 2nd congressional district: Results 1934–1936
Year	Subject	Party	Votes	%	Opponent	Party	Votes	%
1934	William H. Wilson	Republican	44,478	54.71	James P. McGranery	Democratic	36,212	44.55
1936	William H. Wilson (inc.)	Republican	41,267	37.53	James P. McGranery	Democratic	65,779	59.82

U.S. House of Representatives
Preceded by James M. Beck	Member of the U.S. House of Representatives from Pennsylvania's 2nd congressional district 1935–1937	Succeeded by James P. McGranery
