= Harry C. Ransley =

American politician (1863–1941)

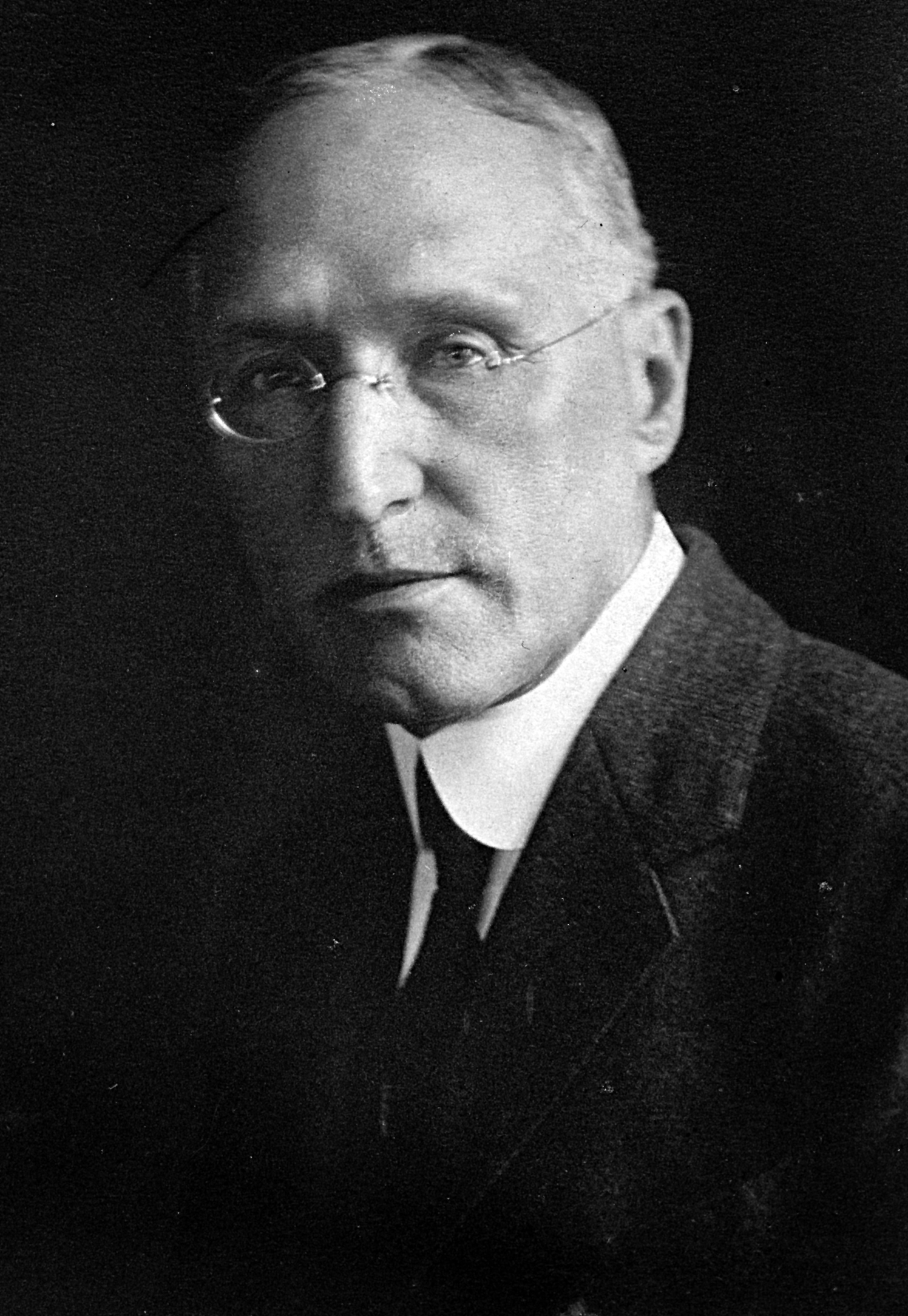
- Ransley in 1923

Member of the U.S. House of Representatives from Pennsylvania
- In office November 2, 1920 – January 3, 1937
- Preceded by: J. Hampton Moore (3rd); James M. Beck (1st)
- Succeeded by: Alfred M. Waldron (3rd); Leon Sacks (1st)
- Constituency: 3rd district (1920-33); 1st district (1933-37)

Personal details
- Born: February 5, 1863 Philadelphia, Pennsylvania, U.S.
- Died: November 7, 1941 (aged 78) Philadelphia, Pennsylvania, U.S.
- Resting place: West Laurel Hill Cemetery (Bala Cynwyd, Pennsylvania)
- Party: Republican

Harry Clay Ransley (February 5, 1863 – November 7, 1941) was a Republican member of the United States House of Representatives from Pennsylvania, serving eight terms from 1921 to 1937.

== Early life and career ==
Harry Ransley was born in Philadelphia, Pennsylvania. He served in the Pennsylvania State House of Representatives from 1891 to 1894. He was a member of the Select Council of Philadelphia for sixteen years and president for eight years. He was a delegate to the 1912 Republican National Convention. He served as sheriff of Philadelphia County from 1916 to 1920. He was chairman of the Republican city committee 1916 to 1919.

== Congress ==
Running as a Republican, in 1920, he sought election to the 66th United States Congress to fill the vacancy caused by the resignation of J. Hampton Moore. He won, and he was subsequently re-elected to the next seven sessions of Congress, serving from 1921 to 1937. He was an unsuccessful candidate for reelection in 1936, losing to Democrat Leon Sacks.

== Death ==
He died on November 7, 1941, and was interred at West Laurel Hill Cemetery in Bala Cynwyd, Pennsylvania.

== Sources ==
- United States Congress. "Harry C. Ransley (id: R000061)". Biographical Directory of the United States Congress.
- The Political Graveyard

U.S. House of Representatives
Preceded by J. Hampton Moore	Member of the U.S. House of Representatives from Pennsylvania's 3rd congressional district 1920 - 1933	Succeeded by Alfred M. Waldron
Preceded by James M. Beck	Member of the U.S. House of Representatives from Pennsylvania's 1st congressional district 1933 - 1937	Succeeded by Leon Sacks
