= James A. Byrne =

American politician

James Aloysius Byrne
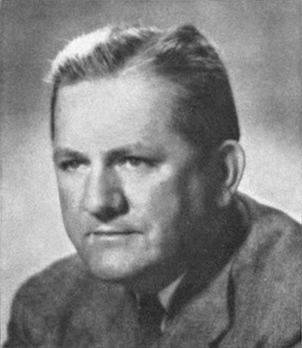

Member of the U.S. House of Representatives from Pennsylvania's 3rd district
- In office January 3, 1953 – January 3, 1973
- Preceded by: Hardie Scott
- Succeeded by: Bill Green III

Member of the Pennsylvania House of Representatives
- In office 1951–1952

Personal details
- Born: June 22, 1906 Philadelphia, Pennsylvania, U.S.
- Died: August 27, 1980 (aged 74) Philadelphia, Pennsylvania, U.S.
- Resting place: Holy Sepulchre Cemetery, Cheltenham Township, Pennsylvania, U.S.
- Party: Democratic

James Aloysius Byrne (June 22, 1906 – August 27, 1980) was an American politician who served as a Democratic member of the U.S. House of Representatives for Pennsylvania's 3rd congressional district from 1953 to 1973.

Jim Byrne was born in Philadelphia, Pennsylvania, to Katherine (née Foody) and James P. Byrne, all four of his grandparents were Irish immigrants. He attended St. Joseph's College in Philadelphia. He was engaged in business as a mortician from 1937 to 1950. He was the county registrar for the Bureau of Vital Statistics, 1934–1939. He served as chief deputy United States Marshal 1940–1943, and as United States marshal for eastern district of Pennsylvania from 1943 to 1945. He was the senior disbursing officer of the Pennsylvania State Treasury from 1945 to 1950. He was a delegate to the Democratic National Convention in 1936. He was a member of the Pennsylvania State House of Representatives in 1951 and 1952. He was elected in 1953 as a Democrat to the 83rd and to the nine succeeding Congresses. He was an unsuccessful candidate for renomination in 1972. Byrne and fellow congressman Bill Green III were put together by redistricting. Green won the primary.

He died on September 3, 1980, and was interred at Holy Sepulchre Cemetery in Cheltenham Township, Pennsylvania.

The James A. Byrne Courthouse in Philadelphia is named in his honor and the grand oak tree in the central courtyard at the University of Pennsylvania was renamed "Byrne's Oak".

U.S. House of Representatives
| Preceded by Hardie Scott | Member of the U.S. House of Representatives from Pennsylvania's 3rd congressional district 1953–1973 | Succeeded by Bill Green III |
