= List of United States senators in the 78th Congress =

This is a complete list of United States senators during the 78th United States Congress listed by seniority from January 3, 1943, to January 3, 1945.

Order of service is based on the commencement of the senator's first term. Behind this is former service as a senator (only giving the senator seniority within their new incoming class), service as vice president, a House member, a cabinet secretary, or a governor of a state. The final factor is the population of the senator's state.

Senators who were sworn in during the middle of the two-year congressional term (up until the last senator who was not sworn in early after winning the November 1944 election) are listed at the end of the list with no number.

In this Congress, the most senior junior senator was Robert Reynolds. The most junior senior senator was James Tunnell, until the death of W. Warren Barbour, after which Albert Hawkes held the distinction.

== Terms of service ==
Class	Terms of service of senators that expired in years
Class 3	Terms of service of senators that expired in 1945 (AL, AR, AZ, CA, CO, CT, FL, GA, ID, IL, IN, IA, KS, KY, LA, MD, MO, NC, ND, NH, NV, NY, OH, OK, OR, PA, SC, SD, UT, VT, WA, and WI.)
Class 1	Terms of service of senators that expired in 1947 (AZ, CA, CT, DE, FL, IN, MA, MD, ME, MI, MN, MO, MS, MT, ND, NE, NJ, NM, NV, NY, OH, PA, RI, TN, TX, UT, VA, VT, WA, WI, WV, and WY.)
Class 2	Terms of service of senators that expired in 1949 (AL, AR, CO, DE, GA, IA, ID, IL, KS, KY, LA, MA, ME, MI, MN, MS, MT, NC, NE, NH, NJ, NM, OK, OR, RI, SC, SD, TN, TX, VA, WV, and WY.)

== U.S. Senate seniority list ==
U.S. Senate seniority
Rank	Senator (party-state)	Seniority date	Other factors
1	Ellison D. Smith (D-SC)	March 4, 1909	
2	Kenneth McKellar (D-TN)	March 4, 1917	
3	Hiram Johnson (R-CA)	March 16, 1917	
4	Charles L. McNary (R-OR)	December 18, 1918	
5	Arthur Capper (R-KS)	March 4, 1919	
6	Carter Glass (D-VA)	February 2, 1920	
7	Walter F. George (D-GA)	November 22, 1922	
8	Henrik Shipstead (R-MN)	March 4, 1923	Minnesota 17th in population (1920)
9	Burton K. Wheeler (D-MT)	March 4, 1923	Montana 39th in population (1920)
10	Robert M. La Follette Jr. (WP-WI)	September 30, 1925	
11	Gerald Nye (R-ND)	November 14, 1925	
12	David I. Walsh (D-MA)	December 6, 1926	
13	Carl Hayden (D-AZ)	March 4, 1927	Former representative (15 years)
14	Alben W. Barkley (D-KY)	March 4, 1927	Former representative (14 years)
15	Elmer Thomas (D-OK)	March 4, 1927	Former representative (4 years), Oklahoma 21st in population (1920)
16	Millard Tydings (D-MD)	March 4, 1927	Former representative (4 years), Maryland 28th in population (1920)
17	Robert F. Wagner (D-NY)	March 4, 1927	
18	Arthur H. Vandenberg (R-MI)	March 31, 1928	
19	Tom Connally (D-TX)	March 4, 1929	
20	James J. Davis (R-PA)	December 2, 1930	
21	Wallace H. White Jr. (R-ME)	March 4, 1931	Former representative
22	Josiah W. Bailey (D-NC)	March 4, 1931	North Carolina 12th in population (1930)
23	John H. Bankhead II (D-AL)	March 4, 1931	Alabama 15th in population (1930)
24	Warren Austin (R-VT)	April 1, 1931	
25	Hattie Caraway (D-AR)	November 13, 1931	
26	Robert R. Reynolds (D-NC)	December 5, 1932	
27	Richard Russell Jr. (D-GA)	January 12, 1933	
28	Bennett Champ Clark (D-MO)	February 4, 1933	
29	John H. Overton (D-LA)	March 4, 1933	Former representative
30	Harry F. Byrd Sr. (D-VA)	March 4, 1933	Former governor
31	Frederick Van Nuys (D-IN)	March 4, 1933	Indiana 11th in population (1930)
32	Homer T. Bone (D-WA)	March 4, 1933	Washington 30th in population (1930)
33	Elbert D. Thomas (D-UT)	March 4, 1933	Utah 40th in population (1930)
34	Pat McCarran (D-NV)	March 4, 1933	Nevada 48th in population (1930)
35	Carl Hatch (D-NM)	October 10, 1933	
36	Joseph C. O'Mahoney (D-WY)	January 1, 1934	
37	James Murray (D-MT)	November 7, 1934	
38	Peter G. Gerry (D-RI)	January 3, 1935	Previously a senator
39	George L. P. Radcliffe (D-MD)	January 3, 1935	Former representative
40	Theodore G. Bilbo (D-MS)	January 3, 1935	Former governor
41	Joseph F. Guffey (D-PA)	January 3, 1935	Pennsylvania 2nd in population (1930)
42	Harry S. Truman (D-MO)	January 3, 1935	Missouri 10th in population (1930)
43	Francis T. Maloney (D-CT)	January 3, 1935	Connecticut 29th in population (1930)
44	Dennis Chavez (D-NM)	May 11, 1935	
45	Guy Mark Gillette (D-IA)	November 4, 1936	Former representative
46	Charles O. Andrews (D-FL)	November 4, 1936	"A" 1st in alphabet
47	Claude Pepper (D-FL)	November 4, 1936	"P" 16th in alphabet
48	Edwin C. Johnson (D-CO)	January 3, 1937	Former governor, Colorado 33rd in population (1930)
49	Theodore F. Green (D-RI)	January 3, 1937	Former governor, Rhode Island 37th in population (1930)
50	Styles Bridges (R-NH)	January 3, 1937	Former governor, New Hampshire 41st in population (1930)
51	Henry Cabot Lodge Jr. (R-MA)	January 3, 1937	Massachusetts 8th in population (1930)
52	Allen J. Ellender (D-LA)	January 3, 1937	Louisiana 22nd in population (1930)
53	Joseph L. Hill (D-AL)	January 11, 1938	
54	William Warren Barbour (R-NJ)	November 9, 1938	Previously a senator
55	Tom Stewart (D-TN)	November 9, 1938	
56	James M. Mead (D-NY)	December 3, 1938	
57	Scott W. Lucas (D-IL)	January 3, 1939	Former representative (4 years), Illinois 3rd in population (1930)
58	D. Worth Clark (D-ID)	January 3, 1939	Former representative (4 years), Idaho 42nd in population (1930)
59	Charles W. Tobey (R-NH)	January 3, 1939	Former representative (2 years)
60	Clyde M. Reed (R-KS)	January 3, 1939	Former governor
61	Robert A. Taft (R-OH)	January 3, 1939	Ohio 4th in population (1930)
62	Sheridan Downey (D-CA)	January 3, 1939	California 6th in population (1930)
63	Alexander Wiley (R-WI)	January 3, 1939	Wisconsin 13th in population (1930)
64	John A. Danaher (R-CT)	January 3, 1939	Connecticut 29th in population (1930)
65	Rufus C. Holman (R-OR)	January 3, 1939	Oregon 34th in population (1930)
66	John Chandler Gurney (R-SD)	January 3, 1939	South Dakota 36th in population (1930)
67	Albert B. Chandler (D-KY)	October 9, 1939	
68	John Thomas (R-ID)	January 27, 1940	
69	C. Wayland Brooks (R-IL)	November 22, 1940	
70	Monrad C. Wallgren (D-WA)	December 19, 1940	
71	Abe Murdock (D-UT)	January 3, 1941	Former representative (8 years)
72	Ralph Owen Brewster (R-ME)	January 3, 1941	Former representative (6 years)
73	William Langer (R-ND)	January 3, 1941	Former governor
74	Harold H. Burton (R-OH)	January 3, 1941	Ohio 4th in population (1940)
75	Raymond E. Willis (R-IN)	January 3, 1941	Indiana 12th in population (1940)
76	Harley M. Kilgore (D-WV)	January 3, 1941	West Virginia 24th in population (1940)
77	Hugh A. Butler (R-NE)	January 3, 1941	Nebraska 32nd in population (1940)
78	Ernest McFarland (D-AZ)	January 3, 1941	Arizona 43rd in population (1940)
79	James M. Tunnell (D-DE)	January 3, 1941	Delaware 47th in population (1940)
80	George Aiken (R-VT)	January 10, 1941	
81	W. Lee O'Daniel (D-TX)	August 4, 1941	
82	Burnet R. Maybank (D-SC)	November 5, 1941	
83	Eugene D. Millikin (R-CO)	December 20, 1941	
84	James G. Scrugham (D-NV)	December 7, 1942	
85	Joseph H. Ball (R-MN)	January 3, 1943	Former senator (2 years)
86	James Eastland (D-MS)	January 3, 1943	Former senator (1 year)
87	John Little McClellan (D-AR)	January 3, 1943	Former representative
88	Harlan J. Bushfield (R-SD)	January 3, 1943	Former governor, South Dakota 37th in population (1940)
89	C. Douglass Buck (R-DE)	January 3, 1943	Former governor, Delaware 47th in population (1940)
90	Homer S. Ferguson (R-MI)	January 3, 1943	Michigan 7th in population (1940)
91	Albert W. Hawkes (R-NJ)	January 3, 1943	New Jersey 9th in population (1940)
92	Edward H. Moore (R-OK)	January 3, 1943	Oklahoma 22nd in population (1940)
93	W. Chapman Revercomb (R-WV)	January 3, 1943	West Virginia 24th in population (1940)
94	Kenneth S. Wherry (R-NE)	January 3, 1943	Nebraska 32nd in population (1940)
95	Edward V. Robertson (R-WY)	January 3, 1943	Wyoming 46th in population (1940)
96	George A. Wilson (R-IA)	January 14, 1943	
	Arthur Walsh (R-NJ)	November 26, 1943	
	Samuel D. Jackson (D-IN)	January 28, 1944	
	Sinclair Weeks (R-MA)	February 8, 1944	
	Guy Cordon (R-OR)	March 4, 1944	
	William E. Jenner (R-IN)	November 14, 1944	
	Wilton E. Hall (D-SC)	November 20, 1944	
	Howard A. Smith (R-NJ)	December 7, 1944	
	Warren G. Magnuson (D-WA)	December 14, 1944	

The most senior senators by class were Kenneth McKellar (D-Tennessee) from Class 1, Charles L. McNary (R-Oregon) from Class 2, and Ellison D. Smith (D-South Carolina) from Class 3.

== See also ==
- 78th United States Congress
- List of United States representatives in the 78th Congress
