= Hardie Scott =

American politician (1907-1999)

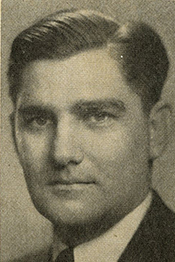

Member of the U.S. House of Representatives from Pennsylvania's 3rd district
- In office January 3, 1947 – January 3, 1953
- Preceded by: Michael J. Bradley
- Succeeded by: James A. Byrne

Personal details
- Born: June 7, 1907 Bala Cynwyd, Pennsylvania, U.S.
- Died: November 2, 1999 (aged 92) Edgmont Township, Pennsylvania, U.S.
- Party: Republican
- Education: Yale University; University of Pennsylvania Law School
- Occupation: Lawyer

Hardie Scott (June 7, 1907 – November 2, 1999) was an American politician who served as a Republican member of the United States House of Representatives for Pennsylvania's 3rd congressional district from 1947 to 1953.

== Early life ==
Hardie Scott, son of John Roger Kirkpatrick Scott, was born in Bala Cynwyd, Pennsylvania on June 7, 1907. He graduated from the Taft School in Watertown, Connecticut, in 1926. He attended Yale University, graduating in 1930. While at Yale, he was captain of the 1930 Yale Polo Team. That year, the team went on to win the intercollegiate polo championship. He was also a member of Psi Upsilon fraternity.

He graduated from the University of Pennsylvania Law School in 1934.

== Career ==
Scott was admitted to the Pennsylvania state bar in 1935 and practiced law with his father. He was the assistant city solicitor and a special duty attorney general.

During World War II, he served in the U.S. Army before being discharged for deafness.

Scott, like his father, had estates outside Philadelphia in the Delaware County horse country, but maintained residences in the City, where his father was a Republican ward leader. The Party designated Hardie Scott as the nominee for the third congressional district in 1944, but he withdrew. In 1946, again with organization support, he took the nomination with 94% of the vote. Scott was one of six Republicans who took Democratic districts in the City that November. Scott's vote for the Taft-Hartley Act lost him some organization support in 1948, but he still won nomination handily with 62%. The election was a narrower challenge; his 62% in 1946 dropped to 52%, but unlike three of the six victors in the previous election he held on. His election margin slipped a bit in 1950, but the victory was still Scott's. His falling margins did not impress the party organization; in 1952 Scott, now a 45-year-old bridegroom, retired from electoral politics. Scott served in the Eightieth, Eighty-first, and Eighty-second Congresses, from 1947 to 1953. In Congress, Scott introduced the bill that authorized the creation of what eventually became Independence National Historical Park.

Scott was then a counsel for the State Securities Commission. He was an associate counsel with Dechert, Price & Rhoads until his retirement.

== Personal life ==
Scott was married to Mrs. MacRoy Jackson (née Almira Geraldine Rockefeller.) in 1952. They bred and trained race horses.

Scott was a member of the Racquet Club, Radnor Hunt, and the Union League of Philadelphia.

He died at his home in Edgmont, Pennsylvania on November 2, 1999 at the age of 92. He was interred at West Laurel Hill Cemetery in Bala Cynwyd, Pennsylvania.

U.S. House of Representatives
Preceded by Michael J. Bradley	Member of the U.S. House of Representatives from Pennsylvania's 3rd congressional district 1947–1953	Succeeded by James A. Byrne
