= Leon Sacks =

American politician

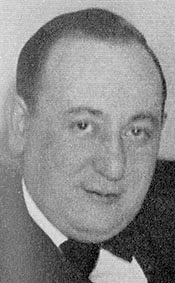

Member of the U.S. House of Representatives from Pennsylvania's 1st district
- In office January 3, 1937 – January 3, 1943
- Preceded by: Harry C. Ransley
- Succeeded by: James A. Gallagher

Personal details
- Born: October 7, 1902 Philadelphia, Pennsylvania, U.S.
- Died: March 11, 1972 (aged 69) Philadelphia, Pennsylvania, U.S.
- Party: Democratic

Military service
- Allegiance: United States
- Years of service: 1943–1946
- Rank: Lieutenant colonel
- Battles/wars: World War II

Leon Sacks (October 7, 1902 – March 11, 1972) was an American lawyer and politician who served three terms as a Democratic member of the U.S. House of Representatives from Pennsylvania from 1937 to 1943.

== Early life ==
Leon Sacks was born in Philadelphia, Pennsylvania, the son of Russian-Jewish immigrants. He graduated from the Wharton School of the University of Pennsylvania at Philadelphia in 1923, and from the law department of the University of Pennsylvania in 1926.

=== Early career ===
He commenced the practice of law in Philadelphia in 1926. He was appointed deputy Attorney General of Pennsylvania in February 1935 and served until January 1937. He was elected as a member of the Democratic State committee in 1936 and served until 1942.

== United States House of Representatives ==
He was elected in 1936 as a Democrat to the 75th United States Congress and to the two succeeding Congresses. He was an unsuccessful candidate for reelection in 1942.

== World War II and later life ==
Sacks served at Army Air Forces Eastern Flying Training Command, with the rank of lieutenant colonel, from January 4, 1943, to January 10, 1946, when resumed the practice of his profession.

He was a member of State Veterans Commission from 1951 to 1969, and the chairman of the registration commission of Philadelphia from 1952 to 1965. He was a member of Military Reservations Commission from 1957 to 1967.

== Death ==
On March 11, 1972, Sacks died in Philadelphia at the age of 69.

== See also ==
- List of Jewish members of the United States Congress

U.S. House of Representatives
Preceded by Harry C. Ransley	Member of the U.S. House of Representatives from Pennsylvania's 1st congressional district 1937 - 1943	Succeeded by James A. Gallagher
