= Alfred M. Waldron =

American politician

Alfred Marpole Waldron (September 21, 1865 – June 28, 1952) was a Republican member of the United States House of Representatives for Pennsylvania.

Alfred Waldron was born in Philadelphia, Pennsylvania. He became engaged in the insurance business. He was a member of the Philadelphia Select Council from 1911 to 1924, and a member of the Republican city committee from 1916 to 1936. He was a delegate to the Republican National Conventions in 1924, 1928, and 1932.

Waldron was elected as a Republican to the 73rd Congress but did not seek renomination in 1934.

== Sources ==
- United States Congress. "Alfred M. Waldron (id: W000040)". Biographical Directory of the United States Congress.

U.S. House of Representatives
Preceded by Harry C. Ransley	Member of the U.S. House of Representatives from Pennsylvania's 3rd congressional district 1933–1935	Succeeded by Clare G. Fenerty
