= Joseph Marmaduke Pratt =

American politician

Joseph M. Pratt
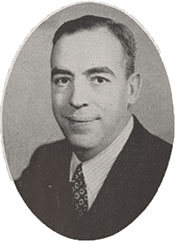
- Pratt in 1944

Member of the U.S. House of Representatives from Pennsylvania's 2nd district
- In office February 8, 1944 – January 3, 1945
- Preceded by: James P. McGranery
- Succeeded by: William T. Granahan

Personal details
- Born: Joseph Marmaduke Pratt; September 4, 1891 Paterson, New Jersey, United States
- Died: July 19, 1946 (aged 54) Washington, D.C., United States
- Resting place: Arlington Cemetery, Drexel Hill, Pennsylvania
- Party: Republican
- Spouse: Miriam Pratt
- Education: Temple University
- Occupation: Politician; businessman
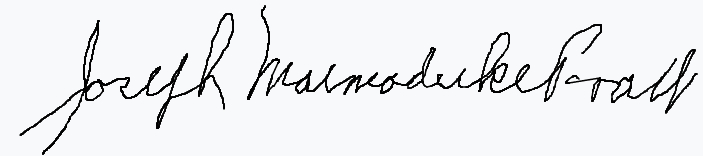
- Signature

Joseph Marmaduke Pratt (September 4, 1891 – July 19, 1946) was a Republican member of the U.S. House of Representatives from Pennsylvania.

== Early life ==
Joseph M. Pratt was born in Paterson, New Jersey, but moved with his parents to Philadelphia, Pennsylvania, in 1892. He graduated from Temple University in Philadelphia in 1919. He went into the business of manufacturing industrial and marine products. He was a member of the Republican City Committee of Philadelphia from 1937 to 1946.

== Congress ==
Pratt was elected as a Republican to Congress to fill the vacancy caused by the resignation of James P. McGranery, defeating future congressman William A. Barrett. He was inaugurated on February 8, 1944. During his term, he was redistricted to the third district, where he was pitted against Democratic incumbent Michael J. Bradley for a full term in 1944. He lost the election and left office on January 3, 1945.

Due to the nature of Pratt's tenure, he was in congress for less than a year, during which he participated in the 78th Congress. He voted 44 times, missing 10.7 percent of roll call votes. His voting record was generally conservative, but less so than the median Republican, as he voted with his party 84 percent of the time as opposed to the median Republican score of 88 percent. His most notable vote was in favor of the 1944 G.I. Bill, which was signed into law by President Franklin D. Roosevelt on June 22, 1944. During his tenure, Pratt served on one committee, the House War Claims Committee.

== Later life and death ==
He resumed his former business pursuits in Philadelphia, but jumped back into politics in 1946, receiving the Republican nomination for State Senator in Pennsylvania's second state senate district. However, he died in Washington, D.C., from a heart attack while on a business trip before the election was held. Pratt was interred in Arlington Cemetery in Upper Darby Township, Pennsylvania.

== Electoral history ==
Pennsylvania's 2nd congressional district: January 1944 special election
Year	Subject	Party	Votes	%	Opponent	Party	Votes	%
1944	Joseph M. Pratt	Republican	24,991	56.59	William A. Barrett	Democratic	19,168	43.41

Pennsylvania's 3rd congressional district: November 1944 general election
Year	Subject	Party	Votes	%	Opponent	Party	Votes	%
1944	Joseph M. Pratt (inc.)	Republican	57,856	41.69	Michael J. Bradley (inc.)	Democratic	80,920	58.31

== Sources ==
- United States Congress. "Joseph M. Pratt (id: P000503)". Biographical Directory of the United States Congress.
- The Political Graveyard

U.S. House of Representatives
Preceded by James P. McGranery	Member of the U.S. House of Representatives from Pennsylvania's 2nd congressional district 1944-1945	Succeeded by William T. Granahan
