= James A. Gallagher =

American politician (1869–1957)

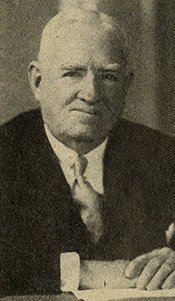

Member of the U.S. House of Representatives from Pennsylvania's 1st district
- In office January 3, 1947 – January 3, 1949
- Preceded by: William A. Barrett
- Succeeded by: William A. Barrett
- In office January 3, 1943 – January 3, 1945
- Preceded by: Leon Sacks
- Succeeded by: William A. Barrett

Personal details
- Born: January 16, 1869 Philadelphia, Pennsylvania, US
- Died: December 8, 1957 (aged 88) Philadelphia, Pennsylvania, US
- Resting place: Holy Cross Cemetery, Yeadon, Pennsylvania
- Party: Republican

James A. Gallagher (January 16, 1869 – December 8, 1957) was an American banker, businessman, and Republican member of the United States House of Representatives from Pennsylvania.

== Early life ==
James A. Gallagher was born in Philadelphia, Pennsylvania on January 16, 1869. He attended the public schools and Philadelphia's Pierce College from 1891 to 1893. Professionally, he began work in merchandise warehousing and transportation in 1886, and later worked in the banking industry.

== Congress ==
Gallagher was elected to Congress as a Republican in November 1942, defeating three-term Democratic incumbent Leon Sacks. In 1944, he lost his re-election bid to Democrat William A. Barrett, who rode to victory on the coattails of the very popular Franklin D. Roosevelt. Two years later, Gallagher returned to Washington during the Republican sweep of Congress in 1946, but would lose renomination in 1948 to Republican John De Nero, who went on to lose to Barrett in November, 53-47%. Barrett went on to represent Philadelphia in Congress for 26 more years until his death in 1976.

As a Congressman, Gallagher had a generally conservative voting record, voting with the Republican Party in 89 and 86 percent of his votes in the 78th and 80th Congresses, respectively. Some of Gallagher's most important votes included voting present on the 1944 G.I. Bill, voting for the Taft-Hartley Act, and voting to amend the United States Constitution to establish term limits. All three bills passed. Gallagher also supported strengthening the U.S. military during the opening stages of the Cold War and reducing inflation. Additionally, he also had a pro-civil rights voting record, voting for an anti-poll tax bill in 1947. During his tenures, Gallagher served on three committees - the Census, Pensions, and Printing committees during his first term, and the House Administration Committee during his second. Gallagher cast 182 total votes during his congressional career, 89 in his first term and 93 in his second. He missed 16 percent of roll call votes, significantly worse than the average of 3.5 percent.

== Death ==
After losing his congressional primary in 1948, Gallagher returned to private life in Philadelphia. He died on December 8, 1957, at age 88. He was interred at the Holy Cross Cemetery in Yeadon, Pennsylvania.

== Electoral history ==
Pennsylvania's 1st congressional district: Results 1942-1946
Year	Subject	Party	Votes	%	Opponent	Party	Votes	%
1942	James A. Gallagher	Republican	44,519	53.45	Leon Sacks (inc.)	Democratic	38,768	46.55
1944	James A. Gallagher (inc.)	Republican	52,159	41.58	William A. Barrett	Democratic	73,289	58.42
1946	James A. Gallagher	Republican	70,680	57.34	William A. Barrett (inc.)	Democratic	52,593	42.66

U.S. House of Representatives
Preceded by Leon Sacks	Member of the U.S. House of Representatives from Pennsylvania's 1st congressional district 1943 - 1945	Succeeded by William A. Barrett
Preceded by William A. Barrett	Member of the U.S. House of Representatives from Pennsylvania's 1st congressional district 1947 - 1949	Succeeded by William A. Barrett
