= Clare G. Fenerty =

American politician

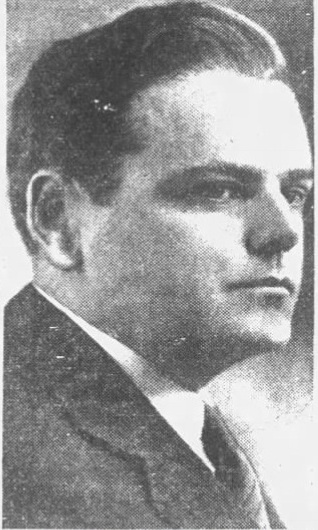
- Courier-Post (Camden, New Jersey), January 22, 1936

Member of the U.S. House of Representatives from Pennsylvania's 3rd district
- In office January 3, 1935 – January 3, 1937
- Preceded by: Alfred M. Waldron
- Succeeded by: Michael J. Bradley

Personal details
- Born: Clare Gerald Fenerty; July 25, 1895 Philadelphia, Pennsylvania, U.S.
- Died: July 1, 1952 (aged 56) Philadelphia, Pennsylvania, U.S.
- Resting place: Holy Sepulchre Cemetery, Cheltenham Township, Pennsylvania, U.S.
- Party: Republican
- Education: St. Joseph's College; University of Pennsylvania Law School

Clare Gerald Fenerty (July 25, 1895 – July 1, 1952) was a Republican member of the United States House of Representatives for Pennsylvania.

== Biography ==
Born in Philadelphia, Pennsylvania, all four of Fenerty's grandparents were Irish immigrants. He graduated from St. Joseph's College in Philadelphia in 1916 and from the law department of the University of Pennsylvania at Philadelphia in 1921. During the First World War, Fenerty served in the United States Navy in 1917 and 1918. He reentered the naval service as a lieutenant, senior grade, in 1933. He was a member of the law faculty at the Wharton School, University of Pennsylvania, 1924–1929; member of the Philadelphia Board of Law Examiners 1928–1940; assistant district attorney at Philadelphia, 1928–1935.

Fenerty was elected as a Republican to the 74th Congress. He was an unsuccessful candidate for reelection in 1936. He was appointed judge of Common Pleas Court No. 5 of Philadelphia in November 1939 and was elected for a ten-year term in November 1941. He was reelected in November 1951 and served until his death in Philadelphia.

He died on July 1, 1952, and was interred at Holy Sepulchre Cemetery in Cheltenham Township, Pennsylvania.

U.S. House of Representatives
Preceded by Alfred M. Waldron	Member of the U.S. House of Representatives from Pennsylvania's 3rd congressional district 1935-1937	Succeeded by Michael J. Bradley
