= Michael J. Bradley (politician) =

American politician

Michael Joseph Bradley
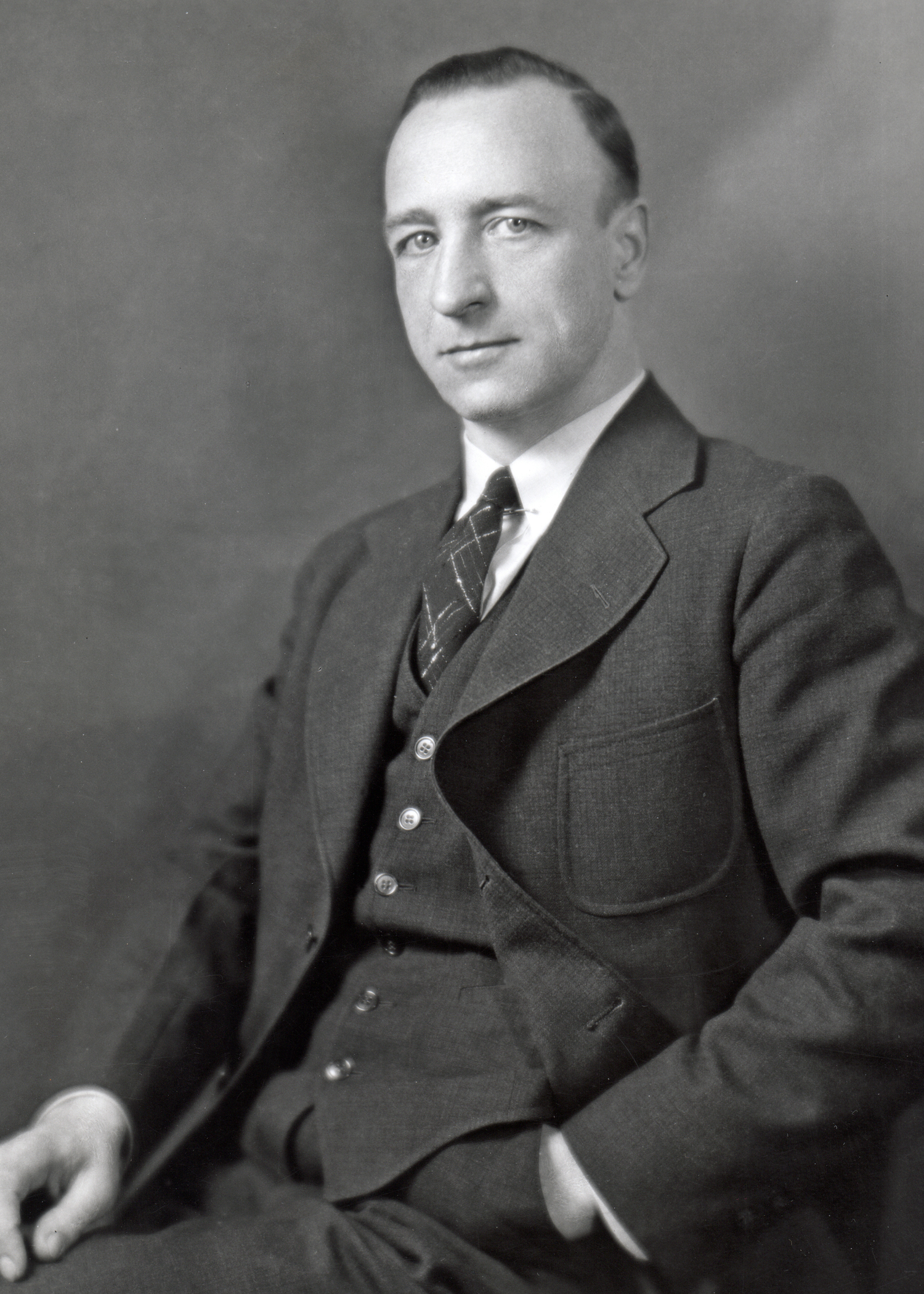

Member of the U.S. House of Representatives from Pennsylvania's 3rd district
- In office January 3, 1937 – January 3, 1947
- Preceded by: Clare G. Fenerty
- Succeeded by: Hardie Scott

Personal details
- Born: May 24, 1897 Philadelphia, Pennsylvania
- Died: November 27, 1979 (aged 82)
- Resting place: Holy Cross Cemetery, Yeadon, Pennsylvania
- Party: Democratic

Michael Joseph Bradley (May 24, 1897 – November 27, 1979) was a Democratic member of the United States House of Representatives for Pennsylvania.

He was born in Philadelphia, Pennsylvania, the son of Irish immigrants. He was engaged as a telegrapher from 1914 to 1917, during which time he was a personal telegrapher to Woodrow Wilson. During the First World War, Bradley served overseas as a chief radio electrician in the United States Navy from 1917 to 1919. He engaged in the security and brokerage business in Philadelphia, from 1921 to 1935, and was the deputy insurance commissioner of Pennsylvania from 1935 to 1937. He was an unsuccessful candidate for election in 1934.

Bradley was elected as a Democrat to the 75th Congress and to the four succeeding Congresses. He was not a candidate for renomination in 1946. After his time in Congress, he was chairman of the Democratic county executive committee of Philadelphia from 1946 to 1948, collector of customs for district No. 11, Port of Philadelphia, 1948–1953; deputy managing director, city of Philadelphia, 1953–1955; member of Pennsylvania Navigation Commission for the Delaware River, 1954–1964; chairman, Board of Fair Labor Standards, city of Philadelphia, 1954–1962.

He had four children (Raymond, Marian, Catharine, Edward) with his wife, Emilia. He became a member of Board of Revision of Taxes, city of Philadelphia, April 1955. He retired in 1976 and lived in Philadelphia, where he died in 1979. He is interred in the Holy Cross Cemetery in Yeadon, Pennsylvania.

== Sources ==
- United States Congress. "Michael J. Bradley (id: B000743)". Biographical Directory of the United States Congress.

U.S. House of Representatives
Preceded by Clare G. Fenerty	Member of the U.S. House of Representatives from Pennsylvania's 3rd congressional district 1937-1947	Succeeded by Hardie Scott
