= James P. McGranery =

American judge

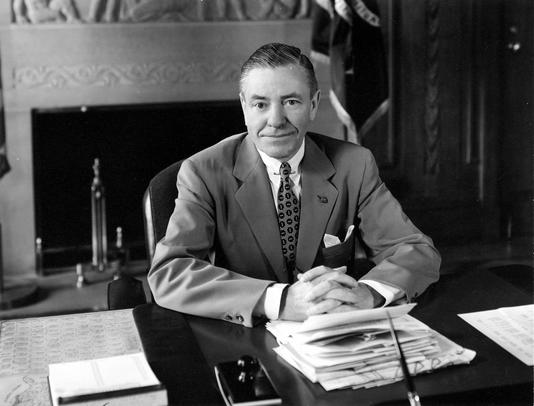

61st United States Attorney General
- In office April 4, 1952 – January 20, 1953
- President: Harry S. Truman
- Preceded by: J. Howard McGrath
- Succeeded by: Herbert Brownell Jr.

Judge of the United States District Court for the Eastern District of Pennsylvania
- In office August 7, 1946 – May 26, 1952
- Appointed by: Harry S. Truman
- Preceded by: Harry Ellis Kalodner
- Succeeded by: John W. Lord Jr.

Member of the U.S. House of Representatives from Pennsylvania's 2nd district
- In office January 3, 1937 – November 17, 1943
- Preceded by: William H. Wilson
- Succeeded by: Joseph Marmaduke Pratt

Personal details
- Born: James Patrick McGranery; July 8, 1895 Philadelphia, Pennsylvania, U.S.
- Died: December 23, 1962 (aged 67) Palm Beach, Florida, U.S.
- Resting place: Arlington National Cemetery
- Party: Democratic
- Education: Temple University Beasley School of Law (LL.B.)

Military service
- Branch/service: United States Army Air Corps
- Years of service: 1917-1919
- Unit: 111th Infantry Regiment
- Battles/wars: World War I

James Patrick McGranery (July 8, 1895 – December 23, 1962) was a United States representative from Pennsylvania, a United States district judge of the United States District Court for the Eastern District of Pennsylvania and Attorney General of the United States.

== Early life and career ==
Born in Philadelphia, Pennsylvania, the son of Patrick McGranery, and Bridget (née Gallagher), both Irish immigrants, McGranery attended parochial schools and graduated from Roman Catholic High School in 1916 and Maher Preparatory School. He was in the United States Army Air Corps as an observation pilot and as an adjutant in the 111th Infantry Regiment from 1917 to 1919. He received a Bachelor of Laws from Temple University Beasley School of Law in 1928 and was admitted to the Pennsylvania bar the same year. He entered the private practice of law in Philadelphia from 1928 to 1937. He was a member of the Democratic State Committee from 1928 to 1932. He was an unsuccessful candidate for District Attorney of Philadelphia County in 1931 and for election to the 74th United States Congress in 1934. He served as Chairman of the Registration Commission of the City of Philadelphia in 1935. He was a United States representative from Pennsylvania from 1937 to 1943. He was admitted to practice before the Supreme Court of the United States in 1939. He was an assistant to the United States Attorney General in the United States Department of Justice in Washington, D.C., from 1943 to 1946.

== Congressional service ==
McGranery was elected as a Democrat to the 75th United States Congress and to the three succeeding Congresses and served from January 3, 1937, until his resignation on November 17, 1943, to become an assistant to the United States Attorney General.

== Federal judicial service ==
In March, 1946, President Harry S. Truman awarded McGranery the Medal for Merit, at the time the highest civilian decoration in the United States. McGranery was nominated by President Truman on July 31, 1946, to a seat on the United States District Court for the Eastern District of Pennsylvania vacated by Judge Harry Ellis Kalodner. He was confirmed by the United States Senate on July 31, 1946, and received his commission on August 7, 1946. He took the oath of office on October 9, 1946. His service was terminated on May 26, 1952, due to his resignation.

== Post judicial service ==
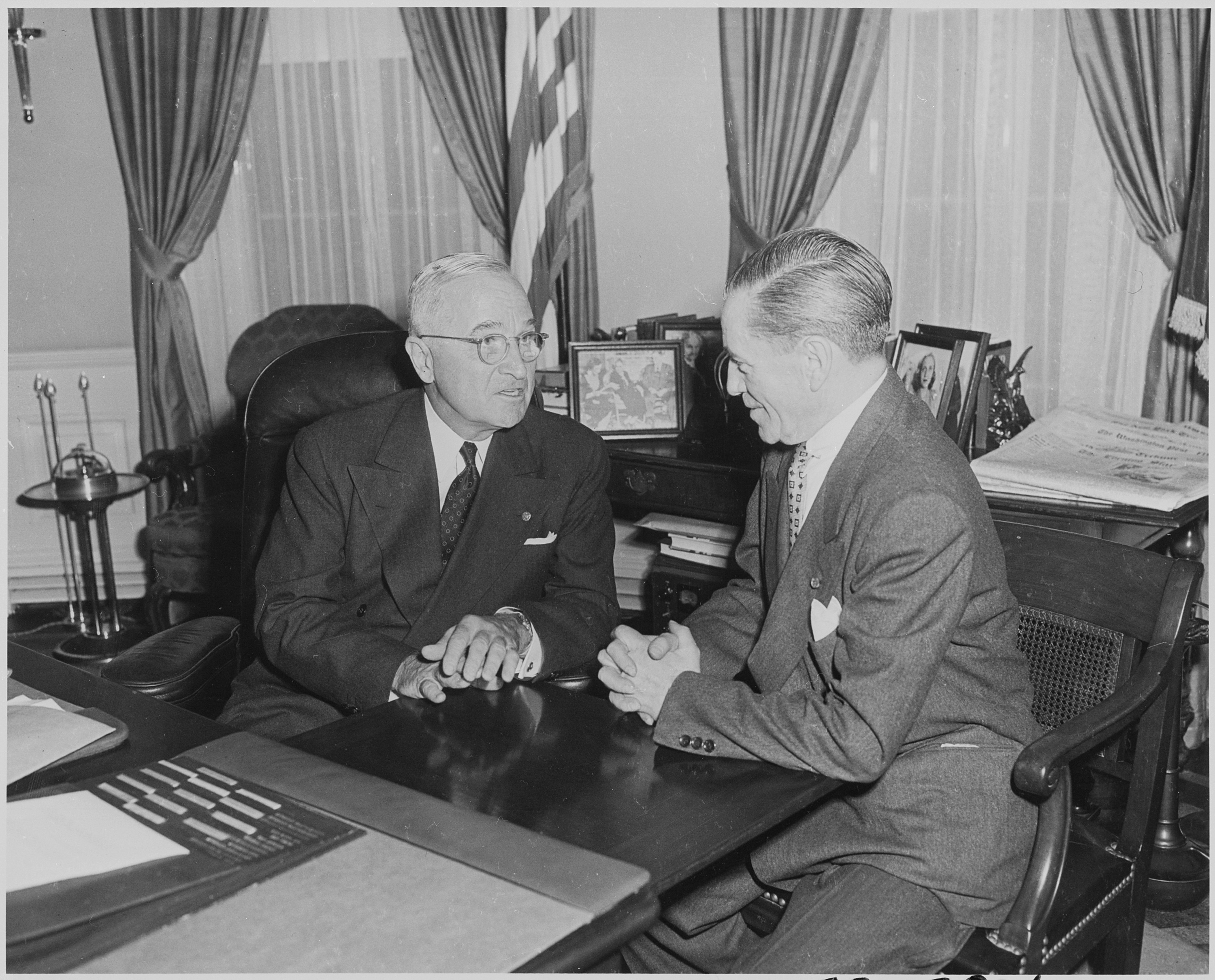
McGranery (right) and President Harry S. Truman at the Oval Office in 1952.

McGranery was the Attorney General of the United States from May 27, 1952, to January 20, 1953. In 1952, McGranery revoked the re-entry permit of Charlie Chaplin while the actor was voluntarily abroad, following concerns over communist sympathies. To re-enter the country, Chaplin was required by immigration law to answer questions regarding “moral turpitude,” and he instead chose to remain abroad for twenty years. McGranery returned to the private practice of law in Washington, D.C., from 1954 until his death.

== Death ==
McGranery died on December 23, 1962, in Palm Beach, Florida. He was interred in Arlington National Cemetery in Fort Myer, Virginia.

U.S. House of Representatives
Preceded by William H. Wilson	Member of the U.S. House of Representatives from Pennsylvania's 2nd congressional district 1937–1943	Succeeded by Joseph Marmaduke Pratt
Legal offices
Preceded by Harry Ellis Kalodner	Judge of the United States District Court for the Eastern District of Pennsylvania; 1946–1952	Succeeded by John W. Lord Jr.
Preceded by J. Howard McGrath	U.S. Attorney General; Served under: Harry S. Truman; 1952–1953	Succeeded by Herbert Brownell Jr.
