= 1944 United States House of Representatives elections =

House elections for the 79th U.S. Congress

- November 7, 1944 (Note: The Maine elections were held September 11, 1944 and the Alaska Territory election was held September 13, 1944.)

All 435 seats in the United States House of Representatives (Note: As well as special elections.) 218 seats needed for a majority
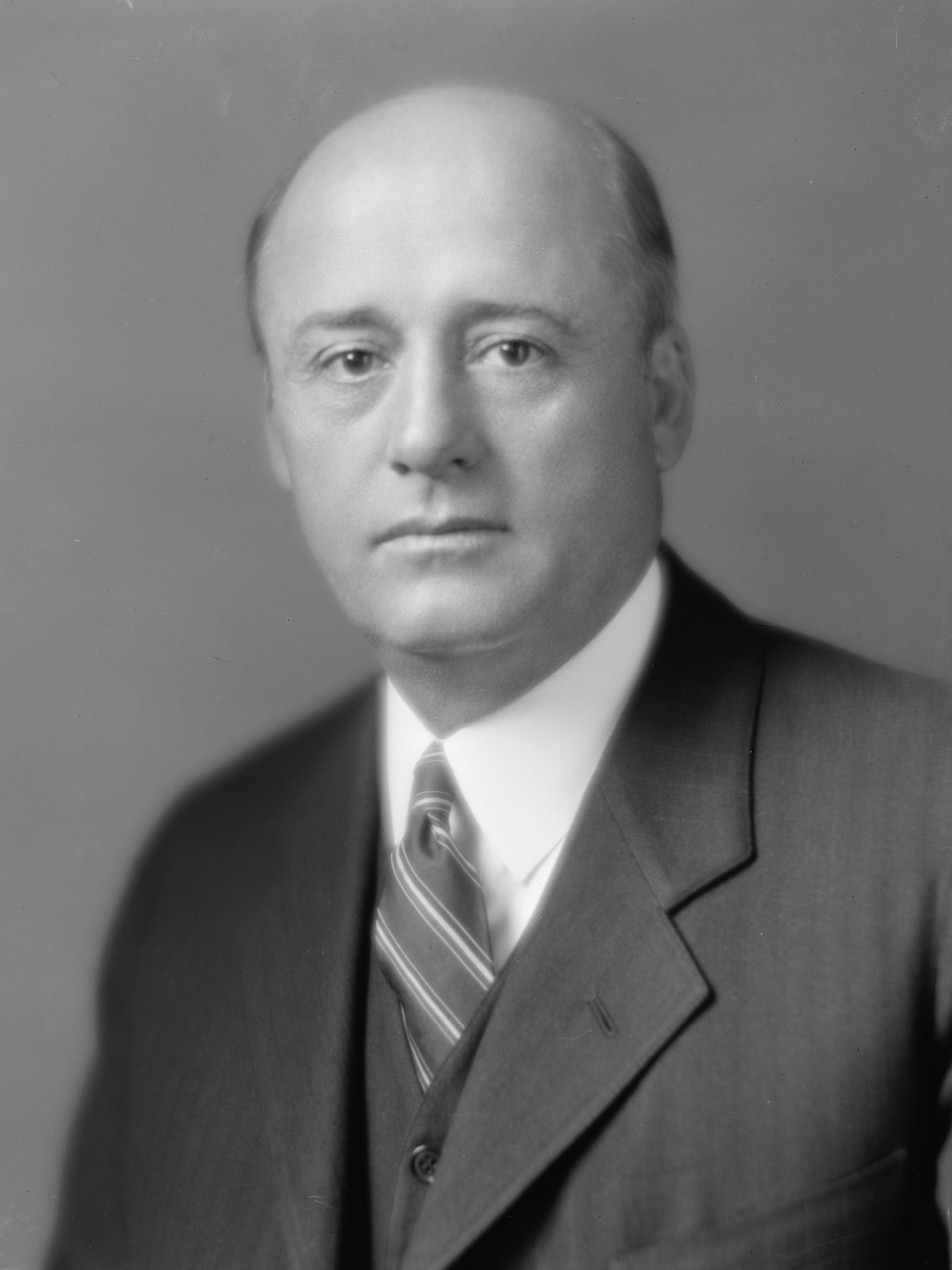

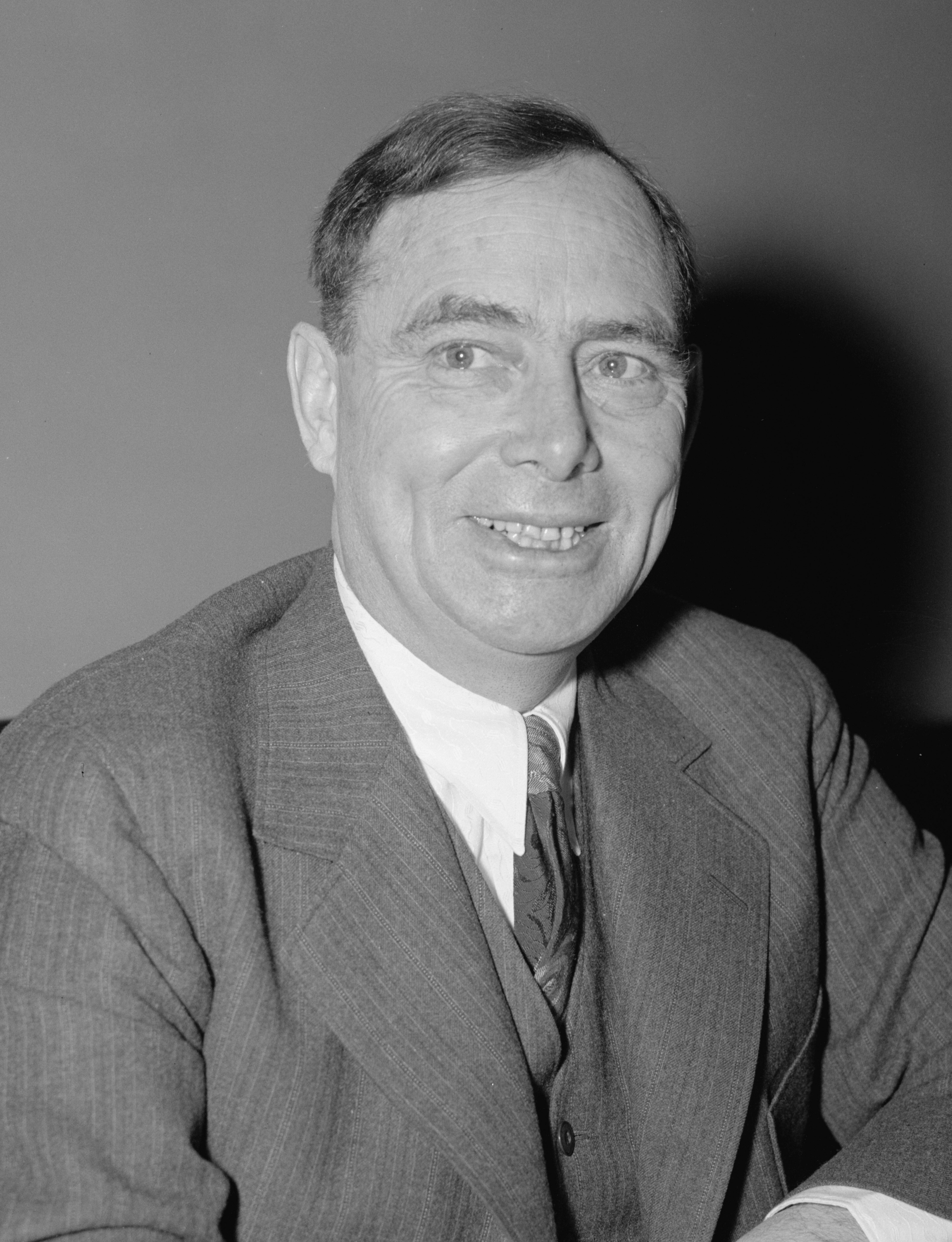
	Majority party	Minority party
Leader	Sam Rayburn	Joseph Martin
Party	Democratic	Republican
Leader since	September 16, 1940	January 3, 1939
Leader's seat	Texas 4th	Massachusetts 14th
Last election	222 seats	209 seats
Seats won	244	189
Seat change	▲22	▼20
Popular vote	23,380,045	21,256,035
Percentage	51.8%	47.1%
Swing	▲4.8pp	▼3.7pp
	Third party	Fourth party
Party	American Labor	Progressive
Last election	1 seat	2 seats
Seats won	1	1
Seat change	Steady	▼1
Popular vote	152,101	108,068
Percentage	0.3%	0.2%
Swing	Steady	▼0.pp
	Fifth party
Party	Farmer–Labor
Last election	1 seat
Seats won	0
Seat change	▼1
Popular vote	19,164
Percentage	0.1%
Swing	▼0.4pp
Speaker before election
Sam Rayburn
Democratic
Elected Speaker
Sam Rayburn
Democratic

The 1944 United States House of Representatives elections were elections for the United States House of Representatives to elect members to serve in the 79th United States Congress. They were held for the most part on November 7, 1944, while Maine held theirs on September 11. These elections coincided with President Franklin D. Roosevelt's re-election to a record fourth term.

Roosevelt's popularity allowed his Democratic Party to gain twenty seats from the Republicans and minor parties, cementing the Democratic majority. Also, Americans rallied behind Allied success in World War II, and in turn voted favorably for the administration's course of action.

As of 2026, this is the last time the House of Representatives was made up of four parties (in December 2020, House Republican Paul Mitchell became an independent, resulting in there being four partisan affiliations (Republican, Democratic, Independent, and Libertarian) though not four political parties).

== Special elections ==
Twelve special elections were held, sorted by election date.

District	Incumbent			This race	
District	Member	Party	First elected	Results	Candidates
Pennsylvania 2	James P. McGranery	Democratic	1936	Incumbent resigned November 17, 1943. New representative elected January 18, 1944. Republican gain. Winner was redistricted to the 3rd district and re-elected in November.	▌ ✓ Joseph M. Pratt (Republican) 56.59%; ▌William A. Barrett (Democratic) 43.41%
Pennsylvania 17	J. William Ditter	Republican	1932	Incumbent died November 21, 1943. New representative elected January 18, 1944. Republican hold. Winner was redistricted to the 16th district and re-elected in November.	▌ ✓ Samuel K. McConnell Jr. (Republican) 83.14%; ▌Marvin B. Brunner (Democratic) 16.86%
New York 21	Joseph A. Gavagan	Democratic	1929 (special)	Incumbent resigned December 30, 1943. New representative elected February 29, 1944. Democratic hold. Winner was re-elected in November.	▌ ✓ James H. Torrens (Democratic) 53.49%; ▌William S. Bennet (Republican) 46.51%
Colorado 1	Lawrence Lewis	Democratic	1932	Incumbent died December 9, 1943. New representative elected March 7, 1944. Republican gain. Winner was re-elected in November.	▌ ✓ Dean M. Gillespie (Republican) 51.55%; ▌Carl E. Wuertele (Democratic) 47.90%; ▌Edgar P. Sherman (Socialist) 0.29%; ▌George M. Phillips (Independent) 0.20%; ▌Frank H. Rice (Justice and The Poor) 0.06%
Alabama 3	Henry B. Steagall	Democratic	1914	Incumbent died November 22, 1943. New representative elected March 14, 1944. Democratic hold. Winner was re-elected in November.	▌ ✓ George W. Andrews (Democratic); Uncontested
Oklahoma 2	John C. Nichols	Democratic	1934	Incumbent resigned July 3, 1943. New representative elected March 28, 1944. Democratic hold. Winner was re-elected in November.	▌ ✓ William G. Stigler (Democratic) 54.36%; ▌E.O. Clark (Republican) 45.64%
New York 4	Thomas H. Cullen	Democratic	1918	Incumbent died March 1, 1944. New representative elected June 6, 1944. Democratic hold. Winner was redistricted to the 12th district and re-elected in November.	▌ ✓ John J. Rooney (Democratic) 71.67%; ▌William G. Nolan (Republican) 28.33%
New York 11	James A. O'Leary	Democratic	1934	Incumbent died March 16, 1944. New representative elected June 6, 1944. Republican gain. Winner was redistricted to the 16th district and re-elected in November.	▌ ✓ Ellsworth B. Buck (Republican) 57.0%; ▌Thomas V. Cantwell (Democratic) 43.0%
Illinois 19	William H. Wheat	Republican	1938	Incumbent died January 16, 1944. New representative elected June 13, 1944. Republican hold. Winner was re-elected in November.	▌ ✓ Rolla C. McMillen (Republican) 98.70%; Uncontested
Louisiana 3	James R. Domengeaux	Democratic	1940	Incumbent resigned April 15, 1944 to join the armed forces but was later medically discharged. Incumbent re-elected November 7, 1944 to fill his own vacancy.	▌ ✓ James R. Domengeaux (Democratic); Uncontested
South Carolina 2	Hampton P. Fulmer	Democratic	1932	Incumbent died October 19, 1944. New representative elected November 7, 1944; see Widow's succession. Democratic hold. Winner did not run for the next term; see below.	▌ ✓ Willa L. Fulmer (Democratic); Uncontested
Virginia 2	Winder R. Harris	Democratic	1941 (special)	Incumbent resigned September 15, 1944. New representative elected November 7, 1944. Democratic hold. Winner was also elected to the next term; see below.	▌ ✓ Ralph Hunter Daughton (Democratic) 54.5%; ▌Thomas L. Woodward (Republican) 26.7%; ▌W. B. Shafer (Independent) 18.9%

== Overall results ==
↓
242	2	191
Democratic	(Note: American Labor and Progressives each had 1 seat.)	Republican

Party	Total seats (change)		Seat percentage	Vote Percentage	Popular vote
Democratic	242	▲20	55.6%	51.8%	23,380,045
Republican	191	▼18	43.9%	47.1%	21,256,035
American Labor Party	1	Steady	0.2%	0.3%	152,101
Progressive	1	▼1	0.2%	0.2%	108,068
Independent	0	Steady	0.0%	0.2%	103,402
Prohibition	0	Steady	0.0%	0.1%	35,782
Socialist	0	Steady	0.0%	0.1%	28,294
Constitutional	0	Steady	0.0%	<0.1%	19,561
Fellowship	0	Steady	0.0%	<0.1%	3,014
Preserving American Independence	0	Steady	0.0%	<0.1%	1,833
Michigan Commonwealth Federation	0	Steady	0.0%	<0.1%	1,753
Socialist Labor	0	Steady	0.0%	<0.1%	340
Victory Without Hate	0	Steady	0.0%	<0.1%	252
Good Government	0	Steady	0.0%	<0.1%	102
Others	0	▼1	0.0%	<0.1%	19,164
Totals	435	+0	100.0%	100.0%	45,109,746

Source: Election Statistics - Office of the Clerk

Popular vote
American Labor	0.34%
Democratic	51.83%
Progressive	0.24%
Republican	47.12%
Others	0.47%

House seats
American Labor	0.23%
Democratic	55.63%
Progressive	0.23%
Republican	43.91%

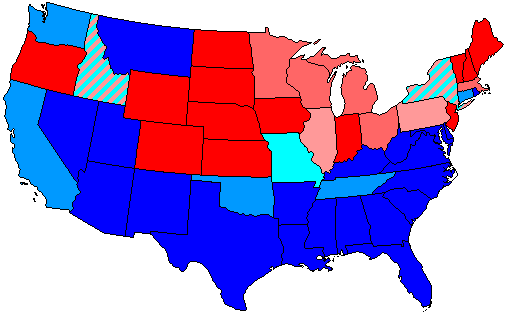
House seats by party holding plurality in state: 80+% Republican / 80+% Democratic; 60+% to 80% Republican / 60+% to 80% Democratic; Up to 60% Republican / Up to 60% Democratic; Striped: Even split

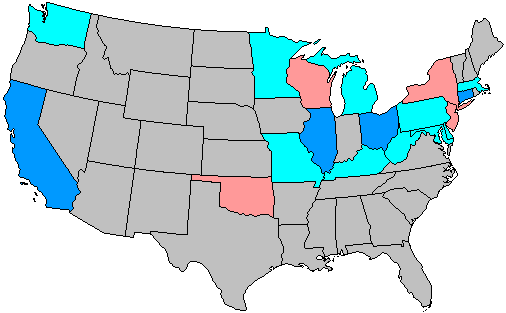
6+ Democratic gain / 6+ Republican gain; 3–5 Democratic gain / 3–5 Republican gain; 1–2 Democratic gain / 1–2 Republican gain; No net change

== Alabama ==
District	Incumbent			This race	
District	Member	Party	First elected	Results	Candidates
Alabama 1	Frank W. Boykin	Democratic	1935 (special)	Incumbent re-elected.	▌ ✓ Frank W. Boykin (Democratic); Uncontested
Alabama 2	George M. Grant	Democratic	1938	Incumbent re-elected.	▌ ✓ George M. Grant (Democratic); Uncontested
Alabama 3	George W. Andrews	Democratic	1944 (special)	Incumbent re-elected.	▌ ✓ George W. Andrews (Democratic); Uncontested
Alabama 4	Sam Hobbs	Democratic	1934	Incumbent re-elected.	▌ ✓ Sam Hobbs (Democratic) 84.5%; ▌O. D. Beard (Republican) 15.5%
Alabama 5	Joe Starnes	Democratic	1934	Incumbent lost renomination. Democratic hold.	▌ ✓ Albert Rains (Democratic); Uncontested
Alabama 6	Pete Jarman	Democratic	1936	Incumbent re-elected.	▌ ✓ Pete Jarman (Democratic); Uncontested
Alabama 7	Carter Manasco	Democratic	1941 (special)	Incumbent re-elected.	▌ ✓ Carter Manasco (Democratic) 65.9%; ▌I. B. Burdick (Republican) 34.1%
Alabama 8	John Sparkman	Democratic	1936	Incumbent re-elected.	▌ ✓ John Sparkman (Democratic); Uncontested
Alabama 9	John P. Newsome	Democratic	1942	Incumbent lost renomination. Democratic hold.	▌ ✓ Luther Patrick (Democratic) 81.7%; ▌H. H. Grooms (Republican) 18.3%

== Arizona ==
Results by county Murdock: 30–40% 40–50% Harless: 30–40% 40–50%

District	Incumbent			This race	
District	Member	Party	First elected	Results	Candidates
Arizona at-large	John R. Murdock	Democratic	1936	Incumbent re-elected.	▌ ✓ John R. Murdock (Democratic) 35.3%; ▌ ✓ Richard F. Harless (Democratic) 34.5%; ▌Margaret Adams Rockwell (Republican) 15.5%; ▌A. M. Ward (Republican) 14.5%; ▌A. Walter Gehres (Prohibition) 0.2%
Arizona at-large	Richard F. Harless	Democratic	1942	Incumbent re-elected.	▌ ✓ John R. Murdock (Democratic) 35.3%; ▌ ✓ Richard F. Harless (Democratic) 34.5%; ▌Margaret Adams Rockwell (Republican) 15.5%; ▌A. M. Ward (Republican) 14.5%; ▌A. Walter Gehres (Prohibition) 0.2%

== Arkansas ==
District	Incumbent			This race	
District	Member	Party	First elected	Results	Candidates
Arkansas 1	Ezekiel C. Gathings	Democratic	1938	Incumbent re-elected.	▌ ✓ Ezekiel C. Gathings (Democratic); Uncontested
Arkansas 2	Wilbur Mills	Democratic	1938	Incumbent re-elected.	▌ ✓ Wilbur Mills (Democratic); Uncontested
Arkansas 3	J. William Fulbright	Democratic	1942	Incumbent retired to run for U.S. senator. Democratic hold.	▌ ✓ James William Trimble (Democratic) 63.3%; ▌Tom Sullivan (Republican) 36.7%
Arkansas 4	William Fadjo Cravens	Democratic	1939 (special)	Incumbent re-elected.	▌ ✓ William Fadjo Cravens (Democratic); Uncontested
Arkansas 5	Brooks Hays	Democratic	1942	Incumbent re-elected.	▌ ✓ Brooks Hays (Democratic) 87.1%; ▌Lonzo A. Ross (Republican) 12.9%
Arkansas 6	William F. Norrell	Democratic	1938	Incumbent re-elected.	▌ ✓ William F. Norrell (Democratic); Uncontested
Arkansas 7	Oren Harris	Democratic	1940	Incumbent re-elected.	▌ ✓ Oren Harris (Democratic); Uncontested

== California ==
District	Incumbent			This race	
District	Member	Party	First elected	Results	Candidates
California 1	Clarence F. Lea	Democratic	1916	Incumbent re-elected.	▌ ✓ Clarence F. Lea (Democratic); Uncontested
California 2	Clair Engle	Democratic	1943 (special)	Incumbent re-elected.	▌ ✓ Clair Engle (Democratic) 63.8%; ▌Jesse M. Mayo (Republican) 36.2%
California 3	J. Leroy Johnson	Republican	1942	Incumbent re-elected.	▌ ✓ J. Leroy Johnson (Republican); Uncontested
California 4	Thomas Rolph	Republican	1940	Incumbent lost re-election. Democratic gain.	▌ ✓ Franck R. Havenner (Democratic) 50.1%; ▌Thomas Rolph (Republican) 49.9%
California 5	Richard J. Welch	Republican	1926	Incumbent re-elected.	▌ ✓ Richard J. Welch (Republican); Uncontested
California 6	Albert E. Carter	Republican	1924	Incumbent lost re-election. Democratic gain.	▌ ✓ George P. Miller (Democratic) 52.0%; ▌Albert E. Carter (Republican) 48.0%
California 7	John H. Tolan	Democratic	1934	Incumbent re-elected.	▌ ✓ John H. Tolan (Democratic) 57.9%; ▌Chesley M. Walter (Republican) 42.1%
California 8	Jack Z. Anderson	Republican	1938	Incumbent re-elected.	▌ ✓ Jack Z. Anderson (Republican) 56.5%; ▌Arthur L. Johnson (Democratic) 43.5%
California 9	Bertrand W. Gearhart	Republican	1934	Incumbent re-elected.	▌ ✓ Bertrand W. Gearhart (Republican); Uncontested
California 10	Alfred J. Elliott	Democratic	1937 (special)	Incumbent re-elected.	▌ ✓ Alfred J. Elliott (Democratic); Uncontested
California 11	George E. Outland	Democratic	1942	Incumbent re-elected.	▌ ✓ George E. Outland (Democratic) 56.0%; ▌Fred J. Hart (Republican) 44.0%
California 12	Jerry Voorhis	Democratic	1936	Incumbent re-elected.	▌ ✓ Jerry Voorhis (Democratic) 55.3%; ▌Roy P. McLaughlin (Republican) 44.7%
California 13	Norris Poulson	Republican	1942	Incumbent lost re-election. Democratic gain.	▌ ✓ Ned R. Healy (Democratic) 55.0%; ▌Norris Poulson (Republican) 45.0%
California 14	Thomas F. Ford	Democratic	1932	Incumbent retired. Democratic hold.	▌ ✓ Helen Gahagan Douglas (Democratic) 51.6%; ▌William D. Campbell (Republican) 48.4%
California 15	John M. Costello	Democratic	1934	Incumbent lost renomination. Republican gain.	▌ ✓ Gordon L. McDonough (Republican) 56.8%; ▌Hal Styles (Democratic) 41.7%; ▌Johannes Nielson-Lange (Prohibition) 1.5%
California 16	Will Rogers Jr.	Democratic	1942	Incumbent resigned May 23, 1944 to serve in U.S. Army. Democratic hold.	▌ ✓ Ellis E. Patterson (Democratic) 54.1%; ▌Jesse Randolph Kellems (Republican) 45.9%
California 17	Cecil R. King	Democratic	1942	Incumbent re-elected.	▌ ✓ Cecil R. King (Democratic); Uncontested
California 18	William Ward Johnson	Republican	1940	Incumbent lost re-election. Democratic gain.	▌ ✓ Clyde Doyle (Democratic) 55.7%; ▌William Ward Johnson (Republican) 44.3%
California 19	Chet Holifield	Democratic	1942	Incumbent re-elected.	▌ ✓ Chet Holifield (Democratic) 71.8%; ▌Carlton H. Casjens (Republican) 28.2%
California 20	John Carl Hinshaw	Republican	1938	Incumbent re-elected.	▌ ✓ John Carl Hinshaw (Republican) 51.8%; ▌Archibald B. Young (Democratic) 46.5%; ▌Charles H. Randall (Prohibition) 1.7%
California 21	Harry R. Sheppard	Democratic	1936	Incumbent re-elected.	▌ ✓ Harry R. Sheppard (Democratic) 58.5%; ▌Earl S. Webb (Republican) 41.5%
California 22	John J. Phillips	Republican	1942	Incumbent re-elected.	▌ ✓ John J. Phillips (Republican); Uncontested
California 23	Edouard Izac	Democratic	1936	Incumbent re-elected.	▌ ✓ Edouard Izac (Democratic) 55.1%; ▌James B. Abbey (Republican) 44.9%

== Colorado ==
District	Incumbent			This race	
District	Member	Party	First elected	Results	Candidates
Colorado 1	Dean M. Gillespie	Republican	1944 (special)	Incumbent re-elected.	▌ ✓ Dean M. Gillespie (Republican) 51.8%; ▌Charles A. Graham (Democratic) 47.8%; ▌Edgar P. Sherman (Socialist) 0.5%
Colorado 2	William S. Hill	Republican	1940	Incumbent re-elected.	▌ ✓ William S. Hill (Republican) 62.3%; ▌David J. Miller (Democratic) 36.7%; ▌Benjamin F. O'Brien (Independent) 0.6%; ▌William E. Randall (Socialist) 0.3%
Colorado 3	John Chenoweth	Republican	1940	Incumbent re-elected.	▌ ✓ John Chenoweth (Republican) 56.3%; ▌Arthur M. Wimmell (Democratic) 43.7%
Colorado 4	Robert F. Rockwell	Republican	1941 (special)	Incumbent re-elected.	▌ ✓ Robert F. Rockwell (Republican) 61.7%; ▌John L. Heuschkel (Democratic) 38.3%

== Connecticut ==
District	Incumbent			This race	
District	Member	Party	First elected	Results	Candidates
Connecticut 1	William J. Miller	Republican	1942	Incumbent lost re-election. Democratic gain.	▌ ✓ Herman P. Kopplemann (Democratic) 54.0%; ▌William J. Miller (Republican) 46.0%
Connecticut 2	John D. McWilliams	Republican	1942	Incumbent lost re-election. Democratic gain.	▌ ✓ Chase G. Woodhouse (Democratic) 51.2%; ▌John D. McWilliams (Republican) 48.8%
Connecticut 3	Ranulf Compton	Republican	1942	Incumbent lost re-election. Democratic gain.	▌ ✓ James P. Geelan (Democratic) 51.5%; ▌Ranulf Compton (Republican) 48.5%
Connecticut 4	Clare Boothe Luce	Republican	1942	Incumbent re-elected.	▌ ✓ Clare Boothe Luce (Republican) 49.9%; ▌Margaret Connor (Democratic) 48.9%; ▌Stanley W. Mahew (Socialist) 1.2%
Connecticut 5	Joseph E. Talbot	Republican	1942	Incumbent re-elected.	▌ ✓ Joseph E. Talbot (Republican) 52.3%; ▌Peter M. Higgins (Democratic) 47.7%
Connecticut at-large	B. J. Monkiewicz	Republican	1942	Incumbent lost re-election. Democratic gain.	▌ ✓ Joseph F. Ryter (Democratic) 51.2%; ▌B. J. Monkiewicz (Republican) 48.0%; ▌John W. Ring (Socialist) 0.7%

== Delaware ==
District	Incumbent			This race	
District	Member	Party	First elected	Results	Candidates
Delaware at-large	Earle D. Willey	Republican	1942	Incumbent lost re-election. Democratic gain.	▌ ✓ Philip A. Traynor (Democratic) 50.3%; ▌Earle D. Willey (Republican) 49.3%; ▌Harold H. Vigneulle (Prohibition) 0.3%

== Florida ==
Florida redistricted for this cycle, converting the 6th seat it had previously gained at reapportionment from an at-large seat to an additional district near Fort Lauderdale.

District	Incumbent			This race	
District	Member	Party	First elected	Results	Candidates
Florida 1	J. Hardin Peterson	Democratic	1932	Incumbent re-elected.	▌ ✓ J. Hardin Peterson (Democratic); Uncontested
Florida 2	Emory H. Price	Democratic	1942	Incumbent re-elected.	▌ ✓ Emory H. Price (Democratic); Uncontested
Florida 3	Bob Sikes	Democratic	1940	Incumbent re-elected.	▌ ✓ Bob Sikes (Democratic); Uncontested
Florida 4	Pat Cannon	Democratic	1938	Incumbent re-elected.	▌ ✓ Pat Cannon (Democratic) 72.0%; ▌Edith Shaffer Stearns (Republican) 28.0%
Florida 5	Joe Hendricks	Democratic	1936	Incumbent re-elected.	▌ ✓ Joe Hendricks (Democratic) 67.5%; ▌Emory Akerman (Republican) 32.5%
Florida 6	Robert A. Green; Redistricted from the at-large district	Democratic	1942	Incumbent retired to run for Governor of Florida. Democratic hold.	▌ ✓ Dwight L. Rogers (Democratic) 69.7%; ▌Edward W. Greb (Republican) 30.3%

== Georgia ==
District	Incumbent			This race	
District	Member	Party	First elected	Results	Candidates
Georgia 1	Hugh Peterson	Democratic	1934	Incumbent re-elected.	▌ ✓ Hugh Peterson (Democratic); Uncontested
Georgia 2	Edward E. Cox	Democratic	1924	Incumbent re-elected.	▌ ✓ Edward E. Cox (Democratic); Uncontested
Georgia 3	Stephen Pace	Democratic	1936	Incumbent re-elected.	▌ ✓ Stephen Pace (Democratic); Uncontested
Georgia 4	Albert Sidney Camp	Democratic	1939 (special)	Incumbent re-elected.	▌ ✓ Albert Sidney Camp (Democratic); Uncontested
Georgia 5	Robert Ramspeck	Democratic	1929 (special)	Incumbent re-elected.	▌ ✓ Robert Ramspeck (Democratic) 94.5%; ▌Henry A. Alexander (Independent) 5.5%
Georgia 6	Carl Vinson	Democratic	1914	Incumbent re-elected.	▌ ✓ Carl Vinson (Democratic); Uncontested
Georgia 7	Malcolm C. Tarver	Democratic	1926	Incumbent re-elected.	▌ ✓ Malcolm C. Tarver (Democratic); Uncontested
Georgia 8	John S. Gibson	Democratic	1940	Incumbent re-elected.	▌ ✓ John S. Gibson (Democratic); Uncontested
Georgia 9	B. Frank Whelchel	Democratic	1934	Incumbent retired. Democratic hold.	▌ ✓ John Stephens Wood (Democratic); Uncontested
Georgia 10	Paul Brown	Democratic	1933 (special)	Incumbent re-elected.	▌ ✓ Paul Brown (Democratic); Uncontested

== Idaho ==
District	Incumbent			This race	
District	Member	Party	First elected	Results	Candidates
Idaho 1	Compton I. White	Democratic	1932	Incumbent re-elected.	▌ ✓ Compton I. White (Democratic) 56.6%; ▌Robert L. Brainard (Republican) 43.4%
Idaho 2	Henry Dworshak	Republican	1938	Incumbent re-elected.	▌ ✓ Henry Dworshak (Republican) 52.3%; ▌Phil J. Evans (Democratic) 47.7%

== Illinois ==
District	Incumbent			This race	
District	Member	Party	First elected	Results	Candidates
Illinois 1	William L. Dawson	Democratic	1942	Incumbent re-elected.	▌ ✓ William L. Dawson (Democratic) 62.0%; ▌William E. King (Republican) 38.0%
Illinois 2	William A. Rowan	Democratic	1942	Incumbent re-elected.	▌ ✓ William A. Rowan (Democratic) 57.3%; ▌Thomas J. Downs (Republican) 42.7%
Illinois 3	Fred E. Busbey	Republican	1942	Incumbent lost re-election. Democratic gain.	▌ ✓ Edward A. Kelly (Democratic) 52.0%; ▌Fred E. Busbey (Republican) 48.0%
Illinois 4	Martin Gorski	Democratic	1942	Incumbent re-elected.	▌ ✓ Martin Gorski (Democratic) 80.4%; ▌Leo J. Kozicki (Republican) 19.6%
Illinois 5	Adolph J. Sabath	Democratic	1906	Incumbent re-elected.	▌ ✓ Adolph J. Sabath (Democratic) 76.3%; ▌Max Price (Republican) 23.7%
Illinois 6	Thomas J. O'Brien	Democratic	1942	Incumbent re-elected.	▌ ✓ Thomas J. O'Brien (Democratic) 59.9%; ▌Charles J. Anderson Jr. (Republican) 39.7%; ▌Iva J. Henderson (Independent) 0.4%
Illinois 7	Vacant			Leonard W. Schuetz (D) died February 13, 1944. Democratic hold.	▌ ✓ William W. Link (Democratic) 54.6%; ▌Charles H. Garland (Republican) 45.4%
Illinois 8	Thomas S. Gordon	Democratic	1942	Incumbent re-elected.	▌ ✓ Thomas S. Gordon (Democratic) 79.2%; ▌John F. Uczciwek (Republican) 20.8%
Illinois 9	Charles S. Dewey	Republican	1940	Incumbent lost re-election. Democratic gain.	▌ ✓ Alexander J. Resa (Democratic) 52.8%; ▌Charles S. Dewey (Republican) 47.2%
Illinois 10	Ralph E. Church	Republican	1942	Incumbent re-elected.	▌ ✓ Ralph E. Church (Republican) 55.8%; ▌Curtis D. MacDougall (Democratic) 44.2%
Illinois 11	Chauncey W. Reed	Republican	1934	Incumbent re-elected.	▌ ✓ Chauncey W. Reed (Republican) 66.2%; ▌Otto Joseph Hruby Jr. (Democratic) 33.8%
Illinois 12	Noah M. Mason	Republican	1936	Incumbent re-elected.	▌ ✓ Noah M. Mason (Republican) 61.0%; ▌Herbert J. Max (Democratic) 39.0%
Illinois 13	Leo E. Allen	Republican	1932	Incumbent re-elected.	▌ ✓ Leo E. Allen (Republican) 70.0%; ▌Garett J. Schutt (Democratic) 30.0%
Illinois 14	Anton J. Johnson	Republican	1938	Incumbent re-elected.	▌ ✓ Anton J. Johnson (Republican) 54.4%; ▌Carl M. Seaberg (Democratic) 45.6%
Illinois 15	Robert B. Chiperfield	Republican	1938	Incumbent re-elected.	▌ ✓ Robert B. Chiperfield (Republican) 59.3%; ▌Ray Simpkins (Democratic) 40.7%
Illinois 16	Everett Dirksen	Republican	1932	Incumbent re-elected.	▌ ✓ Everett Dirksen (Republican) 59.0%; ▌M. R. Clark (Democratic) 41.0%
Illinois 17	Leslie C. Arends	Republican	1934	Incumbent re-elected.	▌ ✓ Leslie C. Arends (Republican) 66.3%; ▌Ruth G. Fillingham (Democratic) 33.7%
Illinois 18	Jessie Sumner	Republican	1938	Incumbent re-elected.	▌ ✓ Jessie Sumner (Republican) 56.9%; ▌Carl B. Jewell (Democratic) 43.1%
Illinois 19	Rolla C. McMillen	Republican	1944 (special)	Incumbent re-elected.	▌ ✓ Rolla C. McMillen (Republican) 55.8%; ▌George M. Brown (Democratic) 44.2%
Illinois 20	Sid Simpson	Republican	1942	Incumbent re-elected.	▌ ✓ Sid Simpson (Republican) 55.6%; ▌Don Irving (Democratic) 44.4%
Illinois 21	George Evan Howell	Republican	1940	Incumbent re-elected.	▌ ✓ George Evan Howell (Republican) 55.7%; ▌Thomas L. Jarrett (Democratic) 44.3%
Illinois 22	Calvin D. Johnson	Republican	1942	Incumbent lost re-election. Democratic gain.	▌ ✓ Melvin Price (Democratic) 50.8%; ▌Calvin D. Johnson (Republican) 49.2%
Illinois 23	Charles W. Vursell	Republican	1942	Incumbent re-elected.	▌ ✓ Charles W. Vursell (Republican) 54.7%; ▌J. E. McMackin (Democratic) 45.3%
Illinois 24	James V. Heidinger	Republican	1940	Incumbent re-elected.	▌ ✓ James V. Heidinger (Republican) 58.2%; ▌Early C. Phelps (Democratic) 41.8%
Illinois 25	C. W. Bishop	Republican	1940	Incumbent re-elected.	▌ ✓ C. W. Bishop (Republican) 53.5%; ▌Kent E. Keller (Democratic) 46.5%
Illinois at-large	Stephen A. Day	Republican	1940	Incumbent lost re-election. Democratic gain.	▌ ✓ Emily Taft Douglas (Democratic) 52.3%; ▌Stephen A. Day (Republican) 47.4%; ▌Walter Klobuchar (Socialist Labor) 0.2%; ▌Elizabeth Stephens Carr (Prohibition) 0.1%

== Indiana ==
District	Incumbent			This race	
District	Member	Party	First elected	Results	Candidates
Indiana 1	Ray Madden	Democratic	1942	Incumbent re-elected.	▌ ✓ Ray Madden (Democratic) 61.3%; ▌Otto G. Fifield (Republican) 38.1%; ▌J. Ralston Miller (Prohibition) 0.3%; ▌Arthur B. Frame (Socialist) 0.3%
Indiana 2	Charles A. Halleck	Republican	1935 (special)	Incumbent re-elected.	▌ ✓ Charles A. Halleck (Republican) 61.6%; ▌James Otis Cox (Democratic) 37.9%; ▌John W. Root (Prohibition) 0.5%
Indiana 3	Robert A. Grant	Republican	1938	Incumbent re-elected.	▌ ✓ Robert A. Grant (Republican) 51.7%; ▌Marshall F. Kizer (Democratic) 47.7%; ▌Granville B. Leeke (Prohibition) 0.6%
Indiana 4	George W. Gillie	Republican	1938	Incumbent re-elected.	▌ ✓ George W. Gillie (Republican) 59.9%; ▌Robert W. Bushee (Democratic) 39.6%; ▌J. M. Dawson (Prohibition) 0.5%
Indiana 5	Forest Harness	Republican	1938	Incumbent re-elected.	▌ ✓ Forest Harness (Republican) 53.1%; ▌Bennett H. Rockey (Democratic) 45.1%; ▌Jasper A. Huffman (Prohibition) 1.8%
Indiana 6	Noble J. Johnson	Republican	1938	Incumbent re-elected.	▌ ✓ Noble J. Johnson (Republican) 55.2%; ▌Olis G. Jamison (Democratic) 44.4%; ▌Pliny Cox (Prohibition) 0.3%
Indiana 7	Gerald W. Landis	Republican	1938	Incumbent re-elected.	▌ ✓ Gerald W. Landis (Republican) 53.9%; ▌Arthur H. Greenwood (Democratic) 45.6%; ▌C. Manson Mood (Prohibition) 0.5%
Indiana 8	Charles M. La Follette	Republican	1942	Incumbent re-elected.	▌ ✓ Charles M. La Follette (Republican) 52.0%; ▌Charles J. Eichel (Democratic) 47.6%; ▌C. Dana Malpass (Prohibition) 0.4%
Indiana 9	Earl Wilson	Republican	1940	Incumbent re-elected.	▌ ✓ Earl Wilson (Republican) 55.6%; ▌George W. Elliott (Democratic) 43.7%; ▌Garnett Jewell (Prohibition) 0.7%
Indiana 10	Raymond S. Springer	Republican	1938	Incumbent re-elected.	▌ ✓ Raymond S. Springer (Republican) 54.3%; ▌Sidney E. Baker (Democratic) 44.5%; ▌Eugene S. Lewis (Prohibition) 1.1%
Indiana 11	Louis Ludlow	Democratic	1928	Incumbent re-elected.	▌ ✓ Louis Ludlow (Democratic) 51.1%; ▌Judson L. Stark (Republican) 48.6%; ▌Ralph E. Webber (Prohibition) 0.3%

== Iowa ==
District	Incumbent			This race	
District	Member	Party	First elected	Results	Candidates
Iowa 1	Thomas E. Martin	Republican	1938	Incumbent re-elected.	▌ ✓ Thomas E. Martin (Republican) 56.7%; ▌Clair A. Williams (Democratic) 43.3%
Iowa 2	Henry O. Talle	Republican	1938	Incumbent re-elected.	▌ ✓ Henry O. Talle (Republican) 55.9%; ▌George C. Classen (Democratic) 44.1%
Iowa 3	John W. Gwynne	Republican	1934	Incumbent re-elected.	▌ ✓ John W. Gwynne (Republican) 56.8%; ▌William D. Kearney (Democratic) 43.2%
Iowa 4	Karl M. LeCompte	Republican	1938	Incumbent re-elected.	▌ ✓ Karl M. LeCompte (Republican) 54.9%; ▌Harold J. Fleck (Democratic) 45.1%
Iowa 5	Paul Cunningham	Republican	1940	Incumbent re-elected.	▌ ✓ Paul Cunningham (Republican) 54.1%; ▌Ralph N. Lynch (Democratic) 45.8%; ▌Betty Ann Paddock (Socialist) 0.2%
Iowa 6	Fred C. Gilchrist	Republican	1930	Incumbent lost renomination. Republican hold.	▌ ✓ James I. Dolliver (Republican) 58.8%; ▌Charles Hanna (Democratic) 41.1%; ▌William F. Leonard (Socialist) 0.1%
Iowa 7	Ben F. Jensen	Republican	1938	Incumbent re-elected.	▌ ✓ Ben F. Jensen (Republican) 61.5%; ▌Albert McGinn (Democratic) 38.4%; ▌Carl O. Nelson (Socialist) 0.04%
Iowa 8	Charles B. Hoeven	Republican	1942	Incumbent re-elected.	▌ ✓ Charles B. Hoeven (Republican) 56.2%; ▌Lester S. Gillete (Democratic) 43.8%; ▌E. A. Donelson (Socialist) 0.03%

== Kansas ==
District	Incumbent			This race	
District	Member	Party	First elected	Results	Candidates
Kansas 1	William P. Lambertson	Republican	1928	Incumbent lost renomination. Republican hold.	▌ ✓ Albert M. Cole (Republican) 67.3%; ▌Ralph Ulm (Democratic) 32.7%
Kansas 2	Errett P. Scrivner	Republican	1943 (special)	Incumbent re-elected.	▌ ✓ Errett P. Scrivner (Republican) 59.1%; ▌Albert Baker (Democratic) 40.9%
Kansas 3	Thomas Daniel Winter	Republican	1938	Incumbent re-elected.	▌ ✓ Thomas Daniel Winter (Republican) 60.2%; ▌Herman L. Gees (Democratic) 39.8%
Kansas 4	Edward Herbert Rees	Republican	1936	Incumbent re-elected.	▌ ✓ Edward Herbert Rees (Republican) 58.6%; ▌William J. Kropp (Democratic) 41.4%
Kansas 5	Clifford R. Hope	Republican	1926	Incumbent re-elected.	▌ ✓ Clifford R. Hope (Republican) 69.0%; ▌A. E. Hawes (Democratic) 31.0%
Kansas 6	Frank Carlson	Republican	1934	Incumbent re-elected.	▌ ✓ Frank Carlson (Republican) 66.0%; ▌Dan M. McCarthy (Democratic) 34.0%

== Kentucky ==
District	Incumbent			This race	
District	Member	Party	First elected	Results	Candidates
Kentucky 1	Noble Jones Gregory	Democratic	1936	Incumbent re-elected.	▌ ✓ Noble Jones Gregory (Democratic) 69.3%; ▌A. R. Anderson (Republican) 29.9%; ▌Hubert H. Jones (Prohibition) 0.5%; ▌Joseph S. Freeland (Socialist) 0.2%
Kentucky 2	Beverly M. Vincent	Democratic	1937 (special)	Incumbent retired. Democratic hold.	▌ ✓ Earle Clements (Democratic) 57.3%; ▌Otis White (Republican) 42.3%; ▌Susie Puckett (Prohibition) 0.3%
Kentucky 3	Emmet O'Neal	Democratic	1934	Incumbent re-elected.	▌ ✓ Emmet O'Neal (Democratic) 57.3%; ▌Garland R. Hubbard (Republican) 42.5%; ▌Bessie Graham (Prohibition) 0.2%
Kentucky 4	Chester O. Carrier	Republican	1943 (special)	Incumbent lost re-election. Democratic gain.	▌ ✓ Frank Chelf (Democratic) 54.5%; ▌Chester O. Carrier (Republican) 45.2%; ▌E. C. Sidle (Prohibition) 0.3%
Kentucky 5	Brent Spence	Democratic	1930	Incumbent re-elected.	▌ ✓ Brent Spence (Democratic) 58.0%; ▌Olin W. Davis (Republican) 41.8%; ▌R. L. Grubbs (Prohibition) 0.2%
Kentucky 6	Virgil Chapman	Democratic	1930	Incumbent re-elected.	▌ ✓ Virgil Chapman (Democratic) 58.7%; ▌George W. Boner (Republican) 41.0%; ▌Carey T. Duckett (Prohibition) 0.3%
Kentucky 7	Andrew J. May	Democratic	1930	Incumbent re-elected.	▌ ✓ Andrew J. May (Democratic) 52.5%; ▌Elmer E. Gabbard (Republican) 47.4%; ▌K. E. Hill (Prohibition) 0.09%
Kentucky 8	Joe B. Bates	Democratic	1930	Incumbent re-elected.	▌ ✓ Joe B. Bates (Democratic) 54.3%; ▌Thomas S. Yates (Republican) 45.6%; ▌H. A. Mastin (Prohibition) 0.1%
Kentucky 9	John M. Robsion	Republican	1934	Incumbent re-elected.	▌ ✓ John M. Robsion (Republican) 68.8%; ▌H. F. Reed (Democratic) 31.0%; ▌Emily L. B. McCamy (Prohibition) 0.3%

== Louisiana ==
District	Incumbent			This race	
District	Member	Party	First elected	Results	Candidates
Louisiana 1	F. Edward Hébert	Democratic	1940	Incumbent re-elected.	▌ ✓ F. Edward Hébert (Democratic); Uncontested
Louisiana 2	Paul H. Maloney	Democratic	1942	Incumbent re-elected.	▌ ✓ Paul H. Maloney (Democratic); Uncontested
Louisiana 3	James R. Domengeaux	Democratic	1940	Incumbent re-elected.	▌ ✓ James R. Domengeaux (Democratic); Uncontested
Louisiana 4	Overton Brooks	Democratic	1936	Incumbent re-elected.	▌ ✓ Overton Brooks (Democratic); Uncontested
Louisiana 5	Charles E. McKenzie	Democratic	1942	Incumbent re-elected.	▌ ✓ Charles E. McKenzie (Democratic); Uncontested
Louisiana 6	James H. Morrison	Democratic	1942	Incumbent re-elected.	▌ ✓ James H. Morrison (Democratic); Uncontested
Louisiana 7	Henry D. Larcade Jr.	Democratic	1942	Incumbent re-elected.	▌ ✓ Henry D. Larcade Jr. (Democratic); Uncontested
Louisiana 8	A. Leonard Allen	Democratic	1936	Incumbent re-elected.	▌ ✓ A. Leonard Allen (Democratic); Uncontested

== Maine ==
District	Incumbent			This race	
District	Member	Party	First elected	Results	Candidates
Maine 1	Robert Hale	Republican	1942	Incumbent re-elected.	▌ ✓ Robert Hale (Republican) 68.8%; ▌Andrew A. Pettis (Democratic) 31.2%
Maine 2	Margaret Chase Smith	Republican	1940	Incumbent re-elected.	▌ ✓ Margaret Chase Smith (Republican) 67.8%; ▌David H. Staples (Democratic) 32.2%
Maine 3	Frank Fellows	Republican	1940	Incumbent re-elected.	▌ ✓ Frank Fellows (Republican) 77.9%; ▌Ralph E. Graham (Democratic) 22.1%

== Maryland ==
District	Incumbent			This race	
District	Member	Party	First elected	Results	Candidates
Maryland 1	David Jenkins Ward	Democratic	1939 (special)	Incumbent lost renomination. Democratic hold.	▌ ✓ Dudley Roe (Democratic) 50.8%; ▌Wilmer Fell Davis (Republican) 49.2%
Maryland 2	Harry Streett Baldwin	Democratic	1942	Incumbent re-elected.	▌ ✓ Harry Streett Baldwin (Democratic) 57.0%; ▌Wilfred T. McQuaid (Republican) 43.0%
Maryland 3	Thomas D'Alesandro Jr.	Democratic	1938	Incumbent re-elected.	▌ ✓ Thomas D'Alesandro Jr. (Democratic) 73.5%; ▌John W. Benson (Republican) 26.5%
Maryland 4	Daniel Ellison	Republican	1942	Incumbent lost re-election. Democratic gain.	▌ ✓ George Hyde Fallon (Democratic) 59.2%; ▌Daniel Ellison (Republican) 40.8%
Maryland 5	Lansdale Sasscer	Democratic	1939 (special)	Incumbent re-elected.	▌ ✓ Lansdale Sasscer (Democratic) 64.8%; ▌C. Maurice Weidemeyer (Republican) 35.2%
Maryland 6	J. Glenn Beall	Republican	1942	Incumbent re-elected.	▌ ✓ J. Glenn Beall (Republican) 57.9%; ▌Daniel F. McMullen (Democratic) 42.1%

== Massachusetts ==
District	Incumbent			This race	
District	Member	Party	First elected	Results	Candidates
Massachusetts 1	Allen T. Treadway	Republican	1912	Incumbent retired. Republican hold.	▌ ✓ John W. Heselton (Republican) 50.4%; ▌James P. McAndrews (Democratic) 49.6%
Massachusetts 2	Charles R. Clason	Republican	1936	Incumbent re-elected.	▌ ✓ Charles R. Clason (Republican) 55.7%; ▌Michael W. Albano (Democratic) 44.3%
Massachusetts 3	Philip J. Philbin	Democratic	1942	Incumbent re-elected.	▌ ✓ Philip J. Philbin (Democratic) 61.5%; ▌Wilfred P. Bazinet (Republican) 38.5%
Massachusetts 4	Pehr G. Holmes	Republican	1930	Incumbent re-elected.	▌ ✓ Pehr G. Holmes (Republican) 55.5%; ▌Frank J. McGrail (Democratic) 44.5%
Massachusetts 5	Edith Nourse Rogers	Republican	1925 (special)	Incumbent re-elected.	▌ ✓ Edith Nourse Rogers (Republican) 73.2%; ▌Milton A. Wesson (Democratic) 26.8%
Massachusetts 6	George J. Bates	Republican	1936	Incumbent re-elected.	▌ ✓ George J. Bates (Republican) 67.0%; ▌John M. Bresnahan (Democratic) 33.0%
Massachusetts 7	Thomas J. Lane	Democratic	1941 (special)	Incumbent re-elected.	▌ ✓ Thomas J. Lane (Democratic) 67.9%; ▌Ernest Bentley (Republican) 32.1%
Massachusetts 8	Angier Goodwin	Republican	1942	Incumbent re-elected.	▌ ✓ Angier Goodwin (Republican) 57.5%; ▌Frederick T. McDermott (Democratic) 42.5%
Massachusetts 9	Charles L. Gifford	Republican	1922	Incumbent re-elected.	▌ ✓ Charles L. Gifford (Republican) 58.5%; ▌William McAuliffe (Democratic) 41.5%
Massachusetts 10	Christian Herter	Republican	1942	Incumbent re-elected.	▌ ✓ Christian Herter (Republican) 55.8%; ▌William A. Carey (Democratic) 44.2%
Massachusetts 11	James Michael Curley	Democratic	1942	Incumbent re-elected.	▌ ✓ James Michael Curley (Democratic) 65.6%; ▌Lester W. Bowen (Republican) 34.4%
Massachusetts 12	John W. McCormack	Democratic	1928	Incumbent re-elected.	▌ ✓ John W. McCormack (Democratic) 75.8%; ▌Henry J. Allen (Republican) 24.2%
Massachusetts 13	Richard B. Wigglesworth	Republican	1928	Incumbent re-elected.	▌ ✓ Richard B. Wigglesworth (Republican) 65.8%; ▌Andrew T. Clancy (Democratic) 34.2%
Massachusetts 14	Joseph W. Martin Jr.	Republican	1924	Incumbent re-elected.	▌ ✓ Joseph W. Martin Jr. (Republican) 62.0%; ▌Edmond P. Talbot (Democratic) 38.0%

== Michigan ==
District	Incumbent			This race	
District	Member	Party	First elected	Results	Candidates
Michigan 1	George G. Sadowski	Democratic	1942	Incumbent re-elected.	▌ ✓ George G. Sadowski (Democratic) 80.6%; ▌John B. Sosnowski (Republican) 19.1%; ▌Benjamin R. Williams (Prohibition) 0.2%; ▌Anthony Zarczynski (Socialist) 0.2%
Michigan 2	Earl C. Michener	Republican	1934	Incumbent re-elected.	▌ ✓ Earl C. Michener (Republican) 64.8%; ▌Redmond M. Burr (Democratic) 35.0%; ▌Clarence DeCan (Prohibition) 0.3%
Michigan 3	Paul W. Shafer	Republican	1936	Incumbent re-elected.	▌ ✓ Paul W. Shafer (Republican) 62.5%; ▌Charles V. Hampton (Democratic) 36.6%; ▌Lawrence A. Ruble (Prohibition) 0.7%; ▌Effie Burnett (Socialist) 0.1%
Michigan 4	Clare Hoffman	Republican	1934	Incumbent re-elected.	▌ ✓ Clare Hoffman (Republican) 64.1%; ▌Bernard T. Foley (Democratic) 35.5%; ▌Orah H. Fox (Prohibition) 0.4%
Michigan 5	Bartel J. Jonkman	Republican	1940	Incumbent re-elected.	▌ ✓ Bartel J. Jonkman (Republican) 57.7%; ▌J. Neal Lamoreaux (Democratic) 42.3%
Michigan 6	William W. Blackney	Republican	1938	Incumbent re-elected.	▌ ✓ William W. Blackney (Republican) 55.2%; ▌Robert B. McLaughlin (Democratic) 44.5%; ▌William H. Morford (Prohibition) 0.3%
Michigan 7	Jesse P. Wolcott	Republican	1930	Incumbent re-elected.	▌ ✓ Jesse P. Wolcott (Republican) 65.8%; ▌Charles F. Mann (Democratic) 33.4%; ▌Gordon Phillips (Prohibition) 0.7%; ▌A. Elmer Graham (Socialist) 0.1%
Michigan 8	Fred L. Crawford	Republican	1934	Incumbent re-elected.	▌ ✓ Fred L. Crawford (Republican) 67.5%; ▌William A. Hemmer (Democratic) 32.1%; ▌Verdon Dunckel (Prohibition) 0.4%
Michigan 9	Albert J. Engel	Republican	1934	Incumbent re-elected.	▌ ✓ Albert J. Engel (Republican) 62.6%; ▌Arnold B. Coxhill (Democratic) 37.4%
Michigan 10	Roy O. Woodruff	Republican	1920	Incumbent re-elected.	▌ ✓ Roy O. Woodruff (Republican) 64.8%; ▌William J. Kelly (Democratic) 34.9%; ▌L. A. Wilson (Prohibition) 0.3%
Michigan 11	Frederick Van Ness Bradley	Republican	1938	Incumbent re-elected.	▌ ✓ Frederick Van Ness Bradley (Republican) 59.0%; ▌Cecil W. Bailey (Democratic) 40.7%; ▌Charles Swanson (Prohibition) 0.3%; ▌George Anderson (Socialist) 0.05%
Michigan 12	John B. Bennett	Republican	1942	Incumbent lost re-election. Democratic gain.	▌ ✓ Frank Eugene Hook (Democratic) 50.6%; ▌John B. Bennett (Republican) 49.4%
Michigan 13	George D. O'Brien	Democratic	1940	Incumbent re-elected.	▌ ✓ George D. O'Brien (Democratic) 57.9%; ▌Clarence J. McLeod (Republican) 41.8%; ▌William Jenkins (Socialist) 0.2%; ▌O. Lon Chaney (Prohibition) 0.1%
Michigan 14	Louis C. Rabaut	Democratic	1934	Incumbent re-elected.	▌ ✓ Louis C. Rabaut (Democratic) 56.4%; ▌Claude G. McDonald (Republican) 43.5%; ▌Lloyd H. Knox (Prohibition) 0.1%
Michigan 15	John Dingell Sr.	Democratic	1932	Incumbent re-elected.	▌ ✓ John Dingell Sr. (Democratic) 63.7%; ▌Harry Henderson (Republican) 36.0%; ▌H. R. McCrary (Socialist) 0.2%; ▌Elmer Myus (Prohibition) 0.08%
Michigan 16	John Lesinski Sr.	Democratic	1932	Incumbent re-elected.	▌ ✓ John Lesinski Sr. (Democratic) 61.4%; ▌Albert A. Riddering (Republican) 38.2%; ▌Charles W. Kingsley (Prohibition) 0.2%; ▌Mint Nauta (Socialist) 0.2%
Michigan 17	George A. Dondero	Republican	1932	Incumbent re-elected.	▌ ✓ George A. Dondero (Republican) 56.4%; ▌John W. L. Hicks (Democratic) 42.6%; ▌Matthew B. Hammond (Commonwealth) 0.9%; ▌Paul Kenworthy (Prohibition) 0.2%

== Minnesota ==
District	Incumbent			This race	
District	Member	Party	First elected	Results	Candidates
Minnesota 1	August H. Andresen	Republican	1934	Incumbent re-elected.	▌ ✓ August H. Andresen (Republican) 61.7%; ▌Andrew Meldahl (DFL) 38.3%
Minnesota 2	Joseph P. O'Hara	Republican	1940	Incumbent re-elected.	▌ ✓ Joseph P. O'Hara (Republican) 75.7%; ▌L. J. Kilbride (DFL) 24.3%
Minnesota 3	Richard P. Gale	Republican	1940	Incumbent lost re-election. Democratic (DFL) gain.	▌ ✓ William Gallagher (DFL) 50.9%; ▌Richard P. Gale (Republican) 49.1%
Minnesota 4	Melvin Maas	Republican	1934	Incumbent lost re-election. Democratic (DFL) gain.	▌ ✓ Frank Starkey (DFL) 51.8%; ▌Melvin Maas (Republican) 48.2%
Minnesota 5	Walter Judd	Republican	1942	Incumbent re-elected.	▌ ✓ Walter Judd (Republican) 56.6%; ▌Edgar T. Buckley (DFL) 43.4%
Minnesota 6	Harold Knutson	Republican	1934	Incumbent re-elected.	▌ ✓ Harold Knutson (Republican) 64.6%; ▌Harry J. O'Brien (DFL) 32.9%; ▌Edward L. Wurst (Fellowship) 2.5%
Minnesota 7	H. Carl Andersen	Republican	1938	Incumbent re-elected.	▌ ✓ H. Carl Andersen (Republican) 65.9%; ▌Arthur F. Nellermoe (DFL) 34.1%
Minnesota 8	William Alvin Pittenger	Republican	1938	Incumbent re-elected.	▌ ✓ William Alvin Pittenger (Republican) 51.9%; ▌William McKinnon (DFL) 48.1%
Minnesota 9	Harold Hagen	Farmer-Labor	1942	Incumbent re-elected as a Republican. Republican gain.	▌ ✓ Harold Hagen (Republican) 59.2%; ▌Halvor Langslet (DFL) 40.8%

== Mississippi ==
District	Incumbent			This race	
District	Member	Party	First elected	Results	Candidates
Mississippi 1	John E. Rankin	Democratic	1920	Incumbent re-elected.	▌ ✓ John E. Rankin (Democratic) 96.9%; ▌A. P. Wilkay (Republican) 3.1%
Mississippi 2	Jamie Whitten	Democratic	1941 (special)	Incumbent re-elected.	▌ ✓ Jamie Whitten (Democratic) 98.7%; ▌William McDonough (Republican) 1.3%
Mississippi 3	William Madison Whittington	Democratic	1924	Incumbent re-elected.	▌ ✓ William Madison Whittington (Democratic) 96.4%; ▌R. C. Patrick (Republican) 3.6%
Mississippi 4	Thomas Abernethy	Democratic	1942	Incumbent re-elected.	▌ ✓ Thomas Abernethy (Democratic); Uncontested
Mississippi 5	W. Arthur Winstead	Democratic	1942	Incumbent re-elected.	▌ ✓ W. Arthur Winstead (Democratic); Uncontested
Mississippi 6	William M. Colmer	Democratic	1932	Incumbent re-elected.	▌ ✓ William M. Colmer (Democratic) 95.7%; ▌Ruth L. Smith (Republican) 4.3%
Mississippi 7	Dan R. McGehee	Democratic	1934	Incumbent re-elected.	▌ ✓ Dan R. McGehee (Democratic) 92.8%; ▌L. R. Collins (Republican) 7.2%

== Missouri ==
District	Incumbent			This race	
District	Member	Party	First elected	Results	Candidates
Missouri 1	Samuel W. Arnold	Republican	1942	Incumbent re-elected.	▌ ✓ Samuel W. Arnold (Republican) 50.7%; ▌Edward M. Jayne (Democratic) 49.3%
Missouri 2	Max Schwabe	Republican	1942	Incumbent re-elected.	▌ ✓ Max Schwabe (Republican) 50.1%; ▌Lue C. Lozier (Democratic) 49.9%; ▌Fred Umstead (Socialist Labor) 0.009%
Missouri 3	William C. Cole	Republican	1942	Incumbent re-elected.	▌ ✓ William C. Cole (Republican) 50.6%; ▌Maurice Hoffman (Democratic) 49.4%
Missouri 4	C. Jasper Bell	Democratic	1934	Incumbent re-elected.	▌ ✓ C. Jasper Bell (Democratic) 57.2%; ▌John W. Mitchell (Republican) 42.8%; ▌Karl L. Oberhen (Socialist Labor) 0.01%
Missouri 5	Roger C. Slaughter	Democratic	1942	Incumbent re-elected.	▌ ✓ Roger C. Slaughter (Democratic) 52.5%; ▌Ralph B. Innis (Republican) 47.4%; ▌Walter S. Engel (Socialist Labor) 0.03%
Missouri 6	Marion T. Bennett	Republican	1943 (special)	Incumbent re-elected.	▌ ✓ Marion T. Bennett (Republican) 57.0%; ▌George A. Clason (Democratic) 43.0%
Missouri 7	Dewey Short	Republican	1934	Incumbent re-elected.	▌ ✓ Dewey Short (Republican) 64.0%; ▌A. L. McCawley (Democratic) 36.0%
Missouri 8	William P. Elmer	Republican	1942	Incumbent lost re-election. Democratic gain.	▌ ✓ A. S. J. Carnahan (Democratic) 50.5%; ▌William P. Elmer (Republican) 49.5%; ▌William Doyen (Socialist Labor) 0.01%
Missouri 9	Clarence Cannon	Democratic	1922	Incumbent re-elected.	▌ ✓ Clarence Cannon (Democratic) 53.2%; ▌William Barton (Republican) 46.8%
Missouri 10	Orville Zimmerman	Democratic	1934	Incumbent re-elected.	▌ ✓ Orville Zimmerman (Democratic) 56.7%; ▌Ralph Hutchison (Republican) 43.3%
Missouri 11	Louis E. Miller	Republican	1942	Incumbent lost re-election. Democratic gain.	▌ ✓ John B. Sullivan (Democratic) 58.9%; ▌Louis E. Miller (Republican) 41.1%; ▌Magalena Schmidt (Socialist Labor) 0.03%
Missouri 12	Walter C. Ploeser	Republican	1940	Incumbent re-elected.	▌ ✓ Walter C. Ploeser (Republican) 51.8%; ▌Phelim O'Toole (Democratic) 48.2%
Missouri 13	John J. Cochran	Democratic	1926	Incumbent re-elected.	▌ ✓ John J. Cochran (Democratic) 100.0%; ▌William McNaught (Socialist Labor) 0.05%

== Montana ==
District	Incumbent			This race	
District	Member	Party	First elected	Results	Candidates
Montana 1	Mike Mansfield	Democratic	1942	Incumbent re-elected.	▌ ✓ Mike Mansfield (Democratic) 67.9%; ▌M. S. Galasso (Republican) 31.1%; ▌Leverne Hamilton (Socialist) 1.0%
Montana 2	James F. O'Connor	Democratic	1936	Incumbent re-elected.	▌ ✓ James F. O'Connor (Democratic) 54.0%; ▌F. F. Haynes (Republican) 45.4%; ▌E. Spriggs (Socialist) 0.6%

== Nebraska ==
District	Incumbent			This race	
District	Member	Party	First elected	Results	Candidates
Nebraska 1	Carl Curtis	Republican	1938	Incumbent re-elected.	▌ ✓ Carl Curtis (Republican) 69.9%; ▌Charles A. Chappell (Democratic) 30.1%
Nebraska 2	Howard Buffett	Republican	1942	Incumbent re-elected.	▌ ✓ Howard Buffett (Republican) 59.5%; ▌Mabel Gillespie (Democratic) 40.5%
Nebraska 3	Karl Stefan	Republican	1934	Incumbent re-elected.	▌ ✓ Karl Stefan (Republican) 68.4%; ▌George Hally (Democratic) 27.8%; ▌W. B. Chili Brazda (Independent) 3.8%
Nebraska 4	Arthur L. Miller	Republican	1942	Incumbent re-elected.	▌ ✓ Arthur L. Miller (Republican) 63.1%; ▌Tom Lanigan (Democratic) 29.9%; ▌Willis B. Furman (Independent) 7.0%

== Nevada ==
District	Incumbent			This race	
District	Member	Party	First elected	Results	Candidates
Nevada at-large	Maurice J. Sullivan	Democratic	1942	Incumbent lost renomination. Democratic hold.	▌ ✓ Berkeley L. Bunker (Democratic) 63.1%; ▌Rex Bell (Republican) 36.9%

== New Hampshire ==
District	Incumbent			This race	
District	Member	Party	First elected	Results	Candidates
New Hampshire 1	Chester E. Merrow	Republican	1942	Incumbent re-elected.	▌ ✓ Chester E. Merrow (Republican) 50.9%; ▌Fortunat E. Normandin (Democratic) 49.1%
New Hampshire 2	Foster Waterman Stearns	Republican	1938	Incumbent retired to run for U.S. Senator. Republican hold.	▌ ✓ Sherman Adams (Republican) 54.4%; ▌Harry Carlson (Democratic) 45.6%; ▌Rita Collyer (Ind. Republican) 0.03%

== New Jersey ==
District	Incumbent			This race	
District	Member	Party	First elected	Results	Candidates
New Jersey 1	Charles A. Wolverton	Republican	1926	Incumbent re-elected.	▌ ✓ Charles A. Wolverton (Republican) 50.4%; ▌John F. Gorman (Democratic) 49.4%; ▌Edward J. Moss Jr. (Prohibition) 0.1%
New Jersey 2	Elmer H. Wene	Democratic	1940	Incumbent retired to run for U.S. Senator. Republican gain.	▌ ✓ T. Millet Hand (Republican) 54.4%; ▌Edison Hedges (Democratic) 45.6%
New Jersey 3	James C. Auchincloss	Republican	1942	Incumbent re-elected.	▌ ✓ James C. Auchincloss (Republican) 57.0%; ▌Arnold E. Ascherfeld (Democratic) 43.0%
New Jersey 4	D. Lane Powers	Republican	1932	Incumbent re-elected.	▌ ✓ D. Lane Powers (Republican) 55.6%; ▌Don Guinness (Democratic) 44.3%; ▌William C. Kauffman (Socialist) 0.03%
New Jersey 5	Charles A. Eaton	Republican	1924	Incumbent re-elected.	▌ ✓ Charles A. Eaton (Republican) 58.4%; ▌Andrew D. Desmond (Democratic) 41.0%; ▌Charles K. Ely (Prohibition) 0.6%
New Jersey 6	Donald H. McLean	Republican	1932	Incumbent retired. Republican hold.	▌ ✓ Clifford P. Case (Republican) 55.5%; ▌Walter H. Van Hoesen (Democratic) 43.1%; ▌Morris W. Scheffer (Amer. Independence) 1.2%; ▌Margaret Cameron Lowe (Prohibition) 0.2%
New Jersey 7	J. Parnell Thomas	Republican	1936	Incumbent re-elected.	▌ ✓ J. Parnell Thomas (Republican) 66.0%; ▌James J. Cannon (Democratic) 33.8%; ▌Harold T. Van Iderstine (Prohibition) 0.1%
New Jersey 8	Gordon Canfield	Republican	1940	Incumbent re-elected.	▌ ✓ Gordon Canfield (Republican) 58.5%; ▌Harry Smith (Democratic) 41.2%; ▌Savilla K. Dormida (Prohibition) 0.2%; ▌Harry Santhouse (Socialist Labor) 0.2%
New Jersey 9	Harry L. Towe	Republican	1942	Incumbent re-elected.	▌ ✓ Harry L. Towe (Republican) 63.5%; ▌Elmer I. Zabriskie (Democratic) 36.5%
New Jersey 10	Fred A. Hartley Jr.	Republican	1928	Incumbent re-elected.	▌ ✓ Fred A. Hartley Jr. (Republican) 52.9%; ▌Luke A. Kiernan Jr. (Democratic) 45.8%; ▌Albert R. Bowden (Prohibition) 1.3%
New Jersey 11	Frank Sundstrom	Republican	1942	Incumbent re-elected.	▌ ✓ Frank Sundstrom (Republican) 51.7%; ▌John J. Francis (Democratic) 46.2%; ▌Wesley U. Morris (Prohibition) 1.8%; ▌Gertrude Lubin (Socialist) 0.3%
New Jersey 12	Robert Kean	Republican	1938	Incumbent re-elected.	▌ ✓ Robert Kean (Republican) 50.6%; ▌John W. Suling (Democratic) 47.2%; ▌Ira V. Smith (Prohibition) 1.8%; ▌Rubye Smith (Socialist) 0.4%
New Jersey 13	Mary Teresa Norton	Democratic	1924	Incumbent re-elected.	▌ ✓ Mary Teresa Norton (Democratic) 69.9%; ▌Frank J. V. Gimino (Republican) 29.9%; ▌William S. Dowd (Victory Without Hate) 0.2%
New Jersey 14	Edward J. Hart	Democratic	1934	Incumbent re-elected.	▌ ✓ Edward J. Hart (Democratic) 63.2%; ▌Otto A. Trankler (Republican) 36.8%

== New Mexico ==
District	Incumbent			This race	
District	Member	Party	First elected	Results	Candidates
New Mexico at-large	Clinton Anderson	Democratic	1940	Incumbent re-elected.	▌ ✓ Clinton Anderson (Democratic) 28.5%; ▌ ✓ Antonio M. Fernández (Democratic) 27.0%; ▌Manuel Lujan Sr. (Republican) 22.3%; ▌Ben F. Meyer (Republican) 22.2%
New Mexico at-large	Antonio M. Fernández	Democratic	1942	Incumbent re-elected.	▌ ✓ Clinton Anderson (Democratic) 28.5%; ▌ ✓ Antonio M. Fernández (Democratic) 27.0%; ▌Manuel Lujan Sr. (Republican) 22.3%; ▌Ben F. Meyer (Republican) 22.2%

== New York ==
New York, after having used 2 at-large districts to avoid redistricting at the last reapportionment, redistricted into 45 districts for this election, with substantial boundary changes across the state. Manhattan went from 10 districts to 6, with Long Island, Brooklyn and Queens going from 10 to 15.

District	Incumbent			This race	
District	Member	Party	First elected	Results	Candidates
New York 1	None (new district)			New seat. Republican gain.	▌ ✓ Edgar A. Sharp (Republican) 69.6%; ▌Edward Hudson (Democratic) 30.4%
New York 2	Leonard W. Hall; Redistricted from the 1st district	Republican	1938	Incumbent re-elected.	▌ ✓ Leonard W. Hall (Republican) 67.9%; ▌John S. Thorp (Democratic) 32.1%
New York 3	None (new district)			New seat. Republican gain.	▌ ✓ Henry J. Latham (Republican) 60.6%; ▌George H. Bruns (Democratic) 39.4%
New York 4	William Bernard Barry; Redistricted from the 2nd district	Democratic	1935 (special)	Incumbent re-elected.	▌ ✓ William Bernard Barry (Democratic) 52.8%; ▌Alfred J. Phillips (Republican) 47.2%
New York 5	None (new district)			New seat. Democratic gain.	▌ ✓ James A. Roe (Democratic) 54.3%; ▌Raymond S. Richmond (Republican) 45.7%
New York 6	None (new district)			New seat. Democratic gain.	▌ ✓ James J. Delaney (Democratic) 55.2%; ▌Otto Schuler (Republican) 44.8%
New York 7	John J. Delaney	Democratic	1931 (special)	Incumbent re-elected.	▌ ✓ John J. Delaney (Democratic) 63.4%; ▌Roy M. D. Richardson (Republican) 36.6%
New York 8	Joseph L. Pfeifer; Redistricted from the 3rd district	Democratic	1934	Incumbent re-elected.	▌ ✓ Joseph L. Pfeifer (Democratic) 59.5%; ▌Frank W. Porcaro (Republican) 40.5%
New York 9	Eugene Keogh	Democratic	1936	Incumbent re-elected.	▌ ✓ Eugene Keogh (Democratic) 55.4%; ▌Harry Chiert (Republican) 30.2%; ▌Jacob A. Salzman (American Labor) 14.4%
New York 10	Andrew Lawrence Somers; Redistricted from the 6th district	Democratic	1924	Incumbent re-elected.	▌ ✓ Andrew Lawrence Somers (Democratic) 57.8%; ▌Philip Kahaner (Republican) 27.0%; ▌Louis P. Goldberg (Liberal) 15.2%
New York 11	James J. Heffernan; Redistricted from the 5th district	Democratic	1940	Incumbent re-elected.	▌ ✓ James J. Heffernan (Democratic) 65.8%; ▌John Patrick Devery (Republican) 34.2%
New York 12	John J. Rooney; Redistricted from the 4th district	Democratic	1944 (special)	Incumbent re-elected.	▌ ✓ John J. Rooney (Democratic) 55.0%; ▌William G. Nolan (Republican) 45.0%
New York 13	Donald Lawrence O'Toole; Redistricted from the 8th district	Democratic	1936	Incumbent re-elected.	▌ ✓ Donald Lawrence O'Toole (Democratic) 60.3%; ▌Clarence W. Archibald (Republican) 39.7%
New York 14	None (new district)			New seat. Democratic gain.	▌ ✓ Leo F. Rayfiel (Democratic) 58.3%; ▌Bernard P. Levy (Republican) 22.1%; ▌James V. King (American Labor) 19.6%
New York 15	Emanuel Celler; Redistricted from the 10th district	Democratic	1922	Incumbent re-elected.	▌ ✓ Emanuel Celler (Democratic) 81.1%; ▌Nathan J. Paulson (Republican) 18.9%
New York 16	Ellsworth B. Buck; Redistricted from the 11th district	Republican	1944 (special)	Incumbent re-elected.	▌ ✓ Ellsworth B. Buck (Republican) 53.5%; ▌Rae L. Egbert (Democratic) 46.5%
New York 17	Joseph C. Baldwin	Republican	1941 (special)	Incumbent re-elected.	▌ ✓ Joseph C. Baldwin (Republican) 52.4%; ▌Max Waterman (Democratic) 39.2%; ▌Seon Felshin (American Labor) 8.3%
New York 17	James H. Fay; Redistricted from the 16th district	Democratic	1942	Incumbent retired. Democratic loss.	▌ ✓ Joseph C. Baldwin (Republican) 52.4%; ▌Max Waterman (Democratic) 39.2%; ▌Seon Felshin (American Labor) 8.3%
New York 18	Martin J. Kennedy	Democratic	1930	Incumbent lost renomination. Democratic loss.	▌ ✓ Vito Marcantonio (American Labor); Uncontested
New York 18	Vito Marcantonio; Redistricted from the 20th district	Labor (Note: In New York's 18th congressional district, Vito Marcantonio (American Labor) won the Republican and Democratic nominations as well.)	1938	Incumbent re-elected.	▌ ✓ Vito Marcantonio (American Labor); Uncontested
New York 19	Samuel Dickstein; Redistricted from the 12th district	Democratic	1922	Incumbent re-elected.	▌ ✓ Samuel Dickstein (Democratic) 73.3%; ▌Hyman Hecht (Republican) 26.7%
New York 19	Louis Capozzoli; Redistricted from the 13th district	Democratic	1940	Incumbent retired. Democratic loss.	▌ ✓ Samuel Dickstein (Democratic) 73.3%; ▌Hyman Hecht (Republican) 26.7%
New York 19	Arthur G. Klein; Redistricted from the 14th district	Democratic	1941 (special)	Incumbent retired. Democratic loss.	▌ ✓ Samuel Dickstein (Democratic) 73.3%; ▌Hyman Hecht (Republican) 26.7%
New York 20	Thomas F. Burchill; Redistricted from the 15th district	Democratic	1942	Incumbent retired. Democratic loss.	▌ ✓ Sol Bloom (Democratic) 70.8%; ▌Lawrence S. Mayers (Republican) 29.2%
New York 20	Sol Bloom; Redistricted from the 19th district	Democratic	1923 (special)	Incumbent re-elected.	▌ ✓ Sol Bloom (Democratic) 70.8%; ▌Lawrence S. Mayers (Republican) 29.2%
New York 21	James H. Torrens	Democratic	1944 (special)	Incumbent re-elected.	▌ ✓ James H. Torrens (Democratic) 69.3%; ▌Herbert Malkin (Republican) 30.7%
New York 22	None (new district)			New seat. Democratic gain.	▌ ✓ Adam Clayton Powell Jr. (Democratic); Uncontested
New York 23	Walter A. Lynch; Redistricted from the 22nd district	Democratic	1940	Incumbent re-elected.	▌ ✓ Walter A. Lynch (Democratic) 79.5%; ▌William J. Waterman (Republican) 20.5%
New York 24	None (new district)			New seat. Democratic gain.	▌ ✓ Benjamin J. Rabin (Democratic) 84.8%; ▌Morris Schaeffer (Republican) 15.2%
New York 25	Charles A. Buckley; Redistricted from the 23rd district	Democratic	1934	Incumbent re-elected.	▌ ✓ Charles A. Buckley (Democratic) 62.1%; ▌Roderick Stephens (Republican) 27.3%; ▌John A. Devany Jr. (Constitutional) 10.6%
New York 26	James M. Fitzpatrick; Redistricted from the 24th district	Democratic	1926	Incumbent retired. Democratic hold.	▌ ✓ Peter A. Quinn (Democratic) 56.4%; ▌Samuel T. Shay (Republican) 43.6%
New York 27	None (new district)			New seat. Republican gain.	▌ ✓ Ralph W. Gwinn (Republican) 61.9%; ▌Joseph E. Venuti (Democratic) 38.1%
New York 28	Ralph A. Gamble; Redistricted from the 25th district	Republican	1937 (special)	Incumbent re-elected.	▌ ✓ Ralph A. Gamble (Republican) 65.5%; ▌John H. Jackson (Democratic) 34.5%
New York 29	Hamilton Fish III; Redistricted from the 26th district	Republican	1920	Incumbent lost re-election. Republican hold. (Note: Bennet, after losing in the Republican primary, ran on the Democratic, American Labor, and Liberal lines, but immediately caucused with the Republicans on election.)	▌ ✓ Augustus W. Bennet (Republican) 53.0%; ▌Hamilton Fish III (Republican) 47.0%
New York 30	Jay Le Fevre; Redistricted from the 27th district	Republican	1942	Incumbent re-elected.	▌ ✓ Jay Le Fevre (Republican) 63.0%; ▌Sharon J. Mauhs (Democratic) 37.0%
New York 31	Bernard W. Kearney; Redistricted from the 30th district	Republican	1942	Incumbent re-elected.	▌ ✓ Bernard W. Kearney (Republican) 60.0%; ▌Alexander Grasso (Democratic) 40.0%
New York 32	William T. Byrne; Redistricted from the 28th district	Democratic	1936	Incumbent re-elected.	▌ ✓ William T. Byrne (Democratic) 57.2%; ▌Miles A. McGrane Jr. (Republican) 42.8%
New York 33	Dean P. Taylor; Redistricted from the 29th district	Republican	1942	Incumbent re-elected.	▌ ✓ Dean P. Taylor (Republican) 62.6%; ▌Thomas P. McLoughlin (Democratic) 34.4%; ▌Henry G. Bell (American Labor) 3.0%
New York 34	Clarence E. Kilburn; Redistricted from the 31st district	Republican	1940	Incumbent re-elected.	▌ ✓ Clarence E. Kilburn (Republican) 62.9%; ▌John D. Van Kennen (Democratic) 37.1%
New York 35	Hadwen C. Fuller; Redistricted from the 32nd district	Republican	1943 (special)	Incumbent re-elected.	▌ ✓ Hadwen C. Fuller (Republican) 52.3%; ▌Samuel H. Miller Jr. (Democratic) 47.7%
New York 35	Fred J. Douglas; Redistricted from the 33rd district	Republican	1936	Incumbent lost renomination. Republican loss.	▌ ✓ Hadwen C. Fuller (Republican) 52.3%; ▌Samuel H. Miller Jr. (Democratic) 47.7%
New York 36	Clarence E. Hancock; Redistricted from the 35th district	Republican	1927 (special)	Incumbent re-elected.	▌ ✓ Clarence E. Hancock (Republican) 53.2%; ▌George M. Haight (Democratic) 46.8%
New York 37	Edwin Arthur Hall; Redistricted from the 34th district	Republican	1939 (special)	Incumbent re-elected.	▌ ✓ Edwin Arthur Hall (Republican) 69.2%; ▌James S. Byrne (Democratic) 30.8%
New York 38	John Taber; Redistricted from the 36th district	Republican	1922	Incumbent re-elected.	▌ ✓ John Taber (Republican) 65.6%; ▌Frank J. Erwin (Democratic) 31.6%; ▌Walter O'Hagan (American Labor) 2.9%
New York 39	W. Sterling Cole; Redistricted from the 37th district	Republican	1934	Incumbent re-elected.	▌ ✓ W. Sterling Cole (Republican) 68.1%; ▌Charlotte D. Curren (Democratic) 28.0%; ▌Julian P. Bretz (American Labor) 4.0%
New York 40	Joseph J. O'Brien; Redistricted from the 38th district	Republican	1938	Incumbent lost re-election. Democratic gain.	▌ ✓ George F. Rogers (Democratic) 50.4%; ▌Joseph J. O'Brien (Republican) 49.6%
New York 41	James W. Wadsworth Jr. Redistricted from the 39th district	Republican	1932	Incumbent re-elected.	▌ ✓ James W. Wadsworth Jr. (Republican) 63.2%; ▌Jean Walrath (Democratic) 36.8%
New York 42	Walter G. Andrews; Redistricted from the 40th district	Republican	1930	Incumbent re-elected.	▌ ✓ Walter G. Andrews (Republican) 57.2%; ▌William Haeseler Jr. (Democratic) 42.8%
New York 43	Joseph Mruk; Redistricted from the 41st district	Republican	1942	Incumbent lost renomination. Republican hold.	▌ ✓ Edward J. Elsaesser (Republican) 51.1%; ▌Raymond J. Barnes (Democratic) 48.9%
New York 44	John Cornelius Butler; Redistricted from the 42nd district	Republican	1941 (special)	Incumbent re-elected.	▌ ✓ John Cornelius Butler (Republican) 50.1%; ▌Leon A. Dombrowski (Democratic) 49.9%
New York 45	Daniel A. Reed; Redistricted from the 43rd district	Republican	1918	Incumbent re-elected.	▌ ✓ Daniel A. Reed (Republican) 64.1%; ▌Orrin H. Parner (Democratic) 35.9%
	Winifred C. Stanley; Redistricted from the at-large seat	Republican	1942	Incumbent retired. Republican loss.	
	Matthew J. Merritt; Redistricted from the at-large seat	Democratic	1934	Incumbent retired. Democratic loss.	

== North Carolina ==
District	Incumbent			This race	
District	Member	Party	First elected	Results	Candidates
North Carolina 1	Herbert Covington Bonner	Democratic	1940	Incumbent re-elected.	▌ ✓ Herbert Covington Bonner (Democratic) 90.6%; ▌R. Clarence Dozier (Republican) 9.4%
North Carolina 2	John H. Kerr	Democratic	1923 (special)	Incumbent re-elected.	▌ ✓ John H. Kerr (Democratic) 95.9%; ▌Thomas J. Moore (Republican) 4.1%
North Carolina 3	Graham Arthur Barden	Democratic	1934	Incumbent re-elected.	▌ ✓ Graham Arthur Barden (Democratic) 71.6%; ▌H. B. Kornegay (Republican) 28.4%
North Carolina 4	Harold D. Cooley	Democratic	1934	Incumbent re-elected.	▌ ✓ Harold D. Cooley (Democratic) 74.7%; ▌J. Ira Lee (Republican) 25.3%
North Carolina 5	John Hamlin Folger	Democratic	1941 (special)	Incumbent re-elected.	▌ ✓ John Hamlin Folger (Democratic) 66.5%; ▌John J. Ingle (Republican) 33.5%
North Carolina 6	Carl T. Durham	Democratic	1938	Incumbent re-elected.	▌ ✓ Carl T. Durham (Democratic) 73.3%; ▌Worth T. Henderson (Republican) 26.7%
North Carolina 7	J. Bayard Clark	Democratic	1928	Incumbent re-elected.	▌ ✓ J. Bayard Clark (Democratic) 79.3%; ▌Josiah A. Maultsby (Republican) 20.7%
North Carolina 8	William O. Burgin	Democratic	1938	Incumbent re-elected.	▌ ✓ William O. Burgin (Democratic) 59.8%; ▌B. C. Brock (Republican) 40.2%
North Carolina 9	Robert L. Doughton	Democratic	1910	Incumbent re-elected.	▌ ✓ Robert L. Doughton (Democratic) 58.8%; ▌Emory C. McCall (Republican) 41.2%
North Carolina 10	Cameron A. Morrison	Democratic	1942	Incumbent retired. Democratic hold.	▌ ✓ Joseph Wilson Ervin (Democratic) 65.4%; ▌Loomis F. Kluttz (Republican) 34.6%
North Carolina 11	Alfred L. Bulwinkle	Democratic	1930	Incumbent re-elected.	▌ ✓ Alfred L. Bulwinkle (Democratic) 65.6%; ▌C. V. Moss (Republican) 34.4%
North Carolina 12	Zebulon Weaver	Democratic	1930	Incumbent re-elected.	▌ ✓ Zebulon Weaver (Democratic) 64.2%; ▌Lewis P. Hamlin (Republican) 35.8%

== North Dakota ==
District	Incumbent			This race	
District	Member	Party	First elected	Results	Candidates
North Dakota at-large	William Lemke	Republican-NPL	1942	Incumbent re-elected.	▌ ✓ William Lemke (Republican-NPL) 29.7%; ▌ ✓ Charles R. Robertson (Republican) 26.9%; ▌Halvor L. Halvorson (Democratic) 16.7%; ▌J. R. Kennedy (Democratic) 13.3%; ▌Usher L. Burdick (Ind. Republican) 11.7%; ▌George McClellan (Ind. Republican) 0.9%; ▌Arthur C. Townley (Ind. Republican) 0.7%
North Dakota at-large	Usher L. Burdick	Republican-NPL	1934	Incumbent retired to run for U.S. senator, but lost the nomination and then lost re-election as an independent. Republican hold.	▌ ✓ William Lemke (Republican-NPL) 29.7%; ▌ ✓ Charles R. Robertson (Republican) 26.9%; ▌Halvor L. Halvorson (Democratic) 16.7%; ▌J. R. Kennedy (Democratic) 13.3%; ▌Usher L. Burdick (Ind. Republican) 11.7%; ▌George McClellan (Ind. Republican) 0.9%; ▌Arthur C. Townley (Ind. Republican) 0.7%

== Ohio ==
District	Incumbent			This race	
District	Member	Party	First elected	Results	Candidates
Ohio 1	Charles H. Elston	Republican	1938	Incumbent re-elected.	▌ ✓ Charles H. Elston (Republican) 56.8%; ▌Frank J. Richter (Democratic) 43.2%
Ohio 2	William E. Hess	Republican	1938	Incumbent re-elected.	▌ ✓ William E. Hess (Republican) 56.0%; ▌J. Harry Moore (Democratic) 44.0%
Ohio 3	Harry P. Jeffrey	Republican	1942	Incumbent lost re-election. Democratic gain.	▌ ✓ Edward J. Gardner (Democratic) 52.6%; ▌Harry P. Jeffrey (Republican) 47.4%
Ohio 4	Robert Franklin Jones	Republican	1938	Incumbent re-elected.	▌ ✓ Robert Franklin Jones (Republican) 61.2%; ▌Earl Ludwig (Democratic) 38.8%
Ohio 5	Cliff Clevenger	Republican	1938	Incumbent re-elected.	▌ ✓ Cliff Clevenger (Republican) 68.1%; ▌T. Walter Williams (Democratic) 31.9%
Ohio 6	Edward O. McCowen	Republican	1942	Incumbent re-elected.	▌ ✓ Edward O. McCowen (Republican) 51.8%; ▌John W. Bush (Democratic) 48.2%
Ohio 7	Clarence J. Brown	Republican	1938	Incumbent re-elected.	▌ ✓ Clarence J. Brown (Republican) 61.7%; ▌John L. Cashin (Democratic) 38.1%; ▌Carl H. Ehl (W/I) 0.2%
Ohio 8	Frederick C. Smith	Republican	1938	Incumbent re-elected.	▌ ✓ Frederick C. Smith (Republican) 59.8%; ▌Roy Warren Roof (Democratic) 40.2%
Ohio 9	Homer A. Ramey	Republican	1942	Incumbent re-elected.	▌ ✓ Homer A. Ramey (Republican) 51.6%; ▌John F. Hunter (Democratic) 48.4%
Ohio 10	Thomas A. Jenkins	Republican	1924	Incumbent re-elected.	▌ ✓ Thomas A. Jenkins (Republican) 64.4%; ▌Elsie Stanton (Democratic) 35.6%
Ohio 11	Walter E. Brehm	Republican	1942	Incumbent re-elected.	▌ ✓ Walter E. Brehm (Republican) 53.6%; ▌Mell G. Underwood Jr. (Democratic) 46.4%
Ohio 12	John M. Vorys	Republican	1938	Incumbent re-elected.	▌ ✓ John M. Vorys (Republican) 54.3%; ▌Forrest F. Smith (Democratic) 45.7%
Ohio 13	Alvin F. Weichel	Republican	1942	Incumbent re-elected.	▌ ✓ Alvin F. Weichel (Republican); Uncontested
Ohio 14	Edmund Rowe	Republican	1942	Incumbent lost re-election. Democratic gain.	▌ ✓ Walter B. Huber (Democratic) 50.6%; ▌Edmund Rowe (Republican) 49.4%
Ohio 15	Percy W. Griffiths	Republican	1942	Incumbent re-elected.	▌ ✓ Percy W. Griffiths (Republican) 60.0%; ▌Olney R. Gillogly (Democratic) 40.0%
Ohio 16	Henderson H. Carson	Republican	1942	Incumbent lost re-election. Democratic gain.	▌ ✓ William R. Thom (Democratic) 52.7%; ▌Henderson H. Carson (Republican) 46.6%; ▌Harry T. Whiteleather (Independent) 0.7%
Ohio 17	J. Harry McGregor	Republican	1940	Incumbent re-elected.	▌ ✓ J. Harry McGregor (Republican) 62.9%; ▌Thomas A. Wilson (Democratic) 37.1%
Ohio 18	Earl R. Lewis	Republican	1942	Incumbent re-elected.	▌ ✓ Earl R. Lewis (Republican) 51.1%; ▌Ross Michener (Democratic) 48.9%
Ohio 19	Michael J. Kirwan	Democratic	1936	Incumbent re-elected.	▌ ✓ Michael J. Kirwan (Democratic) 63.4%; ▌Herschel Hunt (Republican) 36.6%
Ohio 20	Michael A. Feighan	Democratic	1942	Incumbent re-elected.	▌ ✓ Michael A. Feighan (Democratic) 75.9%; ▌A. R. McNamara (Republican) 24.1%
Ohio 21	Robert Crosser	Democratic	1922	Incumbent re-elected.	▌ ✓ Robert Crosser (Democratic) 77.7%; ▌Harry C. Gahn (Republican) 22.3%
Ohio 22	Frances P. Bolton	Republican	1940	Incumbent re-elected.	▌ ✓ Frances P. Bolton (Republican) 57.4%; ▌Don O. Cameron (Democratic) 42.6%
Ohio at-large	George H. Bender	Republican	1938	Incumbent re-elected.	▌ ✓ George H. Bender (Republican) 53.1%; ▌William Glass (Democratic) 46.9%

== Oklahoma ==
District	Incumbent			This race	
District	Member	Party	First elected	Results	Candidates
Oklahoma 1	Wesley E. Disney	Democratic	1930	Incumbent retired to run for U.S. Senator. Republican gain.	▌ ✓ George B. Schwabe (Republican) 51.1%; ▌Dennis Bushyhead (Democratic) 48.9%
Oklahoma 2	William G. Stigler	Democratic	1944 (special)	Incumbent re-elected.	▌ ✓ William G. Stigler (Democratic) 58.0%; ▌E. O. Clark (Republican) 42.0%
Oklahoma 3	Paul Stewart	Democratic	1942	Incumbent re-elected.	▌ ✓ Paul Stewart (Democratic) 76.1%; ▌Russell Overstreet (Republican) 23.9%
Oklahoma 4	Lyle Boren	Democratic	1936	Incumbent re-elected.	▌ ✓ Lyle Boren (Democratic) 61.7%; ▌Ralph R. Kirchner (Republican) 38.3%
Oklahoma 5	Mike Monroney	Democratic	1938	Incumbent re-elected.	▌ ✓ Mike Monroney (Democratic) 62.7%; ▌Howard B. Hopps (Republican) 37.0%; ▌Cora C. Schott (Prohibition) 0.3%
Oklahoma 6	Jed Johnson	Democratic	1926	Incumbent re-elected.	▌ ✓ Jed Johnson (Democratic) 60.0%; ▌Ted R. Fisher (Republican) 40.0%
Oklahoma 7	Victor Wickersham	Democratic	1941 (special)	Incumbent re-elected.	▌ ✓ Victor Wickersham (Democratic) 70.8%; ▌J. Warren White (Republican) 29.2%
Oklahoma 8	Ross Rizley	Republican	1940	Incumbent re-elected.	▌ ✓ Ross Rizley (Republican) 57.6%; ▌Phillip C. Ferguson (Democratic) 41.6%; ▌Harold Abbott (Independent) 0.8%

== Oregon ==
District	Incumbent			This race	
District	Member	Party	First elected	Results	Candidates
Oregon 1	James W. Mott	Republican	1932	Incumbent re-elected.	▌ ✓ James W. Mott (Republican) 66.7%; ▌O. Henry Oleen (Democratic) 33.3%
Oregon 2	Lowell Stockman	Republican	1942	Incumbent re-elected.	▌ ✓ Lowell Stockman (Republican) 65.7%; ▌C. J. Shorb (Democratic) 34.3%
Oregon 3	Homer D. Angell	Republican	1938	Incumbent re-elected.	▌ ✓ Homer D. Angell (Republican) 55.1%; ▌Lester Sheeley (Democratic) 44.9%
Oregon 4	Harris Ellsworth	Republican	1942	Incumbent re-elected.	▌ ✓ Harris Ellsworth (Republican) 64.0%; ▌Floyd K. Dover (Democratic) 36.0%

== Pennsylvania ==
Pennsylvania redistricted from 32 districts and an at-large seat to 33 districts.

District	Incumbent			This race	
District	Member	Party	First elected	Results	Candidates
Pennsylvania 1	James A. Gallagher	Republican	1942	Incumbent lost re-election. Democratic gain.	▌ ✓ William A. Barrett (Democratic) 58.4%; ▌James A. Gallagher (Republican) 41.6%
Pennsylvania 2	Francis J. Myers; Redistricted from the 6th district	Democratic	1938	Incumbent retired to run for U.S. Senator. Democratic hold.	▌ ✓ William T. Granahan (Democratic) 62.7%; ▌Charles M. Mosser (Republican) 37.3%
Pennsylvania 3	Michael J. Bradley	Democratic	1936	Incumbent re-elected.	▌ ✓ Michael J. Bradley (Democratic) 58.3%; ▌Joseph Marmaduke Pratt (Republican) 41.7%
Pennsylvania 3	Joseph Marmaduke Pratt; Redistricted from the 2nd district	Republican	1944 (special)	Incumbent lost re-election. Republican loss.	▌ ✓ Michael J. Bradley (Democratic) 58.3%; ▌Joseph Marmaduke Pratt (Republican) 41.7%
Pennsylvania 4	John E. Sheridan	Democratic	1939 (special)	Incumbent re-elected.	▌ ✓ John E. Sheridan (Democratic) 66.2%; ▌Franklin J. Maloney (Republican) 33.8%
Pennsylvania 5	C. Frederick Pracht	Republican	1942	Incumbent lost re-election. Democratic gain.	▌ ✓ William J. Green Jr. (Democratic) 54.2%; ▌C. Frederick Pracht (Republican) 45.8%
Pennsylvania 6	Hugh Scott; Redistricted from the 7th district	Republican	1940	Incumbent lost re-election. Democratic gain.	▌ ✓ Herbert J. McGlinchey (Democratic) 50.7%; ▌Hugh Scott (Republican) 49.2%; ▌Joseph N. Cameron (Democratic) 0.09%
Pennsylvania 7	James Wolfenden; Redistricted from the 8th district	Republican	1928	Incumbent re-elected.	▌ ✓ James Wolfenden (Republican) 51.5%; ▌Vernon O'Rourke (Democratic) 48.5%
Pennsylvania 8	Charles L. Gerlach; Redistricted from the 9th district	Republican	1938	Incumbent re-elected.	▌ ✓ Charles L. Gerlach (Republican) 58.0%; ▌Marie M. Bickert (Democratic) 42.0%
Pennsylvania 9	J. Roland Kinzer; Redistricted from the 10th district	Republican	1930	Incumbent re-elected.	▌ ✓ J. Roland Kinzer (Republican) 61.3%; ▌H. Clay Burkholder (Democratic) 38.7%
Pennsylvania 10	John W. Murphy; Redistricted from the 11th district	Democratic	1942	Incumbent re-elected.	▌ ✓ John W. Murphy (Democratic) 56.4%; ▌Walter W. Kohler (Republican) 43.6%
Pennsylvania 11	Thomas B. Miller; Redistricted from the 12th district	Republican	1942	Incumbent lost re-election. Democratic gain.	▌ ✓ Daniel Flood (Democratic) 52.1%; ▌Thomas B. Miller (Republican) 47.9%
Pennsylvania 12	Ivor D. Fenton; Redistricted from the 13th district	Republican	1938	Incumbent re-elected.	▌ ✓ Ivor D. Fenton (Republican) 56.8%; ▌Charles E. Klinger (Democratic) 43.2%
Pennsylvania 13	Daniel K. Hoch; Redistricted from the 14th district	Democratic	1942	Incumbent re-elected.	▌ ✓ Daniel K. Hoch (Democratic) 54.1%; ▌Randolph Stauffer (Republican) 41.6%; ▌Raymond S. Hofses (Socialist) 4.4%
Pennsylvania 14	Wilson D. Gillette; Redistricted from the 15th district	Republican	1941 (special)	Incumbent re-elected.	▌ ✓ Wilson D. Gillette (Republican) 65.0%; ▌Clement J. Reap (Democratic) 35.0%
Pennsylvania 15	None (new district)			New seat. Republican gain.	▌ ✓ Robert F. Rich (Republican) 61.0%; ▌Richard F. Hartzell (Democratic) 39.0%
Pennsylvania 16	Samuel K. McConnell Jr. Redistricted from the 17th district	Republican	1944 (special)	Incumbent re-elected.	▌ ✓ Samuel K. McConnell Jr. (Republican) 63.7%; ▌Marvin B. Brunner (Democratic) 36.3%
Pennsylvania 17	Richard M. Simpson; Redistricted from the 18th district	Republican	1937 (special)	Incumbent re-elected.	▌ ✓ Richard M. Simpson (Republican) 64.5%; ▌John W. Mann (Democratic) 35.5%
Pennsylvania 18	John C. Kunkel; Redistricted from the 19th district	Republican	1938	Incumbent re-elected.	▌ ✓ John C. Kunkel (Republican) 62.5%; ▌Howard K. Beard (Democratic) 37.5%
Pennsylvania 19	Leon H. Gavin; Redistricted from the 20th district	Republican	1942	Incumbent re-elected.	▌ ✓ Leon H. Gavin (Republican) 63.3%; ▌John C. Brecht (Democratic) 35.2%; ▌Robert G. Burnham (Prohibition) 1.5%
Pennsylvania 20	Francis E. Walter; Redistricted from the 21st district	Democratic	1932	Incumbent re-elected.	▌ ✓ Francis E. Walter (Democratic) 57.3%; ▌Charles A. P. Bartlett (Republican) 42.7%
Pennsylvania 21	Chester H. Gross; Redistricted from the 22nd district	Republican	1942	Incumbent re-elected.	▌ ✓ Chester H. Gross (Republican) 52.6%; ▌Josiah W. Gitt (Democratic) 47.4%
Pennsylvania 22	D. Emmert Brumbaugh; Redistricted from the 23rd district	Republican	1943 (special)	Incumbent re-elected.	▌ ✓ D. Emmert Brumbaugh (Republican) 57.8%; ▌Bernard J. Clark (Democratic) 42.2%
Pennsylvania 23	J. Buell Snyder; Redistricted from the 24th district	Democratic	1932	Incumbent re-elected.	▌ ✓ J. Buell Snyder (Democratic) 54.6%; ▌Carl H. Hoffman (Republican) 45.4%
Pennsylvania 24	Grant Furlong; Redistricted from the 25th district	Democratic	1942	Incumbent lost renomination. Democratic hold.	▌ ✓ Thomas E. Morgan (Democratic) 62.2%; ▌Gilbert E. Koedel (Republican) 37.8%
Pennsylvania 25	Louis E. Graham; Redistricted from the 26th district	Republican	1938	Incumbent re-elected.	▌ ✓ Louis E. Graham (Republican) 50.4%; ▌Samuel G. Neff (Democratic) 49.6%
Pennsylvania 26	Harve Tibbott; Redistricted from the 27th district	Republican	1938	Incumbent re-elected.	▌ ✓ Harve Tibbott (Republican) 52.6%; ▌Eddie McCloskey (Democratic) 47.4%
Pennsylvania 27	Augustine B. Kelley; Redistricted from the 28th district	Democratic	1940	Incumbent re-elected.	▌ ✓ Augustine B. Kelley (Democratic) 59.7%; ▌Edward J. Howard (Republican) 40.3%
Pennsylvania 28	Robert L. Rodgers; Redistricted from the 29th district	Republican	1938	Incumbent re-elected.	▌ ✓ Robert L. Rodgers (Republican) 54.6%; ▌James F. Lavery (Democratic) 45.4%
Pennsylvania 29	None (new district)			New seat. Republican gain.	▌ ✓ Howard E. Campbell (Republican) 50.2%; ▌John F. Lowers (Democratic) 49.8%
Pennsylvania 30	Thomas E. Scanlon; Redistricted from the 16th district	Democratic	1940	Incumbent lost re-election. Republican gain.	▌ ✓ Robert J. Corbett (Republican) 51.7%; ▌Thomas E. Scanlon (Democratic) 48.3%
Pennsylvania 31	James A. Wright; Redistricted from the 32nd district	Democratic	1940	Incumbent lost re-election. Republican gain.	▌ ✓ James G. Fulton (Republican) 53.8%; ▌James A. Wright (Democratic) 46.2%
Pennsylvania 32	Herman P. Eberharter; Redistricted from the 31st district	Democratic	1936	Incumbent re-elected.	▌ ✓ Herman P. Eberharter (Democratic) 71.6%; ▌Gregory Žatkovich (Republican) 28.4%
Pennsylvania 33	Samuel A. Weiss; Redistricted from the 30th district	Democratic	1940	Incumbent re-elected.	▌ ✓ Samuel A. Weiss (Democratic) 69.3%; ▌Ray A. Liddle (Republican) 30.7%
	William I. Troutman; Redistricted from the at-large district	Republican	1942	Incumbent retired. District eliminated. Republican loss.	

== Rhode Island ==
District	Incumbent			This race	
District	Member	Party	First elected	Results	Candidates
Rhode Island 1	Aime Forand	Democratic	1940	Incumbent re-elected.	▌ ✓ Aime Forand (Democratic) 61.9%; ▌Charles A. Curran (Republican) 38.1%; ▌Charles R. Napier (Good Government) 0.07%
Rhode Island 2	John E. Fogarty	Democratic	1940	Incumbent re-elected.	▌ ✓ John E. Fogarty (Democratic) 57.8%; ▌Charles T. Algren (Republican) 42.2%

== South Carolina ==
District	Incumbent			This race	
District	Member	Party	First elected	Results	Candidates
South Carolina 1	L. Mendel Rivers	Democratic	1940	Incumbent re-elected.	▌ ✓ L. Mendel Rivers (Democratic) 92.8%; ▌O. H. Wilcox (Republican) 7.2%
South Carolina 2	Vacant			Hampton P. Fulmer (D) died October 19, 1944. Democratic hold.	▌ ✓ John J. Riley (Democratic) 98.0%; ▌H. G. Willingham (Republican) 2.0%
South Carolina 3	Butler B. Hare	Democratic	1938	Incumbent re-elected.	▌ ✓ Butler B. Hare (Democratic) 97.0%; ▌D. F. Merrill (Republican) 3.0%
South Carolina 4	Joseph R. Bryson	Democratic	1938	Incumbent re-elected.	▌ ✓ Joseph R. Bryson (Democratic) 95.7%; ▌J. G. Jones (Republican) 4.3%
South Carolina 5	James P. Richards	Democratic	1932	Incumbent re-elected.	▌ ✓ James P. Richards (Democratic) 98.1%; ▌W. I. Bost (Republican) 1.9%
South Carolina 6	John L. McMillan	Democratic	1938	Incumbent re-elected.	▌ ✓ John L. McMillan (Democratic) 98.0%; ▌C. B. Ruffin (Republican) 2.0%

== South Dakota ==
District	Incumbent			This race	
District	Member	Party	First elected	Results	Candidates
South Dakota 1	Karl Mundt	Republican	1938	Incumbent re-elected.	▌ ✓ Karl Mundt (Republican) 64.0%; ▌Grover Lothrop (Democratic) 36.0%
South Dakota 2	Francis Case	Republican	1936	Incumbent re-elected.	▌ ✓ Francis Case (Republican) 69.0%; ▌H. W. Clarkson (Democratic) 31.0%

== Tennessee ==
District	Incumbent			This race	
District	Member	Party	First elected	Results	Candidates
Tennessee 1	B. Carroll Reece	Republican	1932	Incumbent re-elected.	▌ ✓ B. Carroll Reece (Republican); Uncontested
Tennessee 2	John Jennings	Republican	1939 (special)	Incumbent re-elected.	▌ ✓ John Jennings (Republican) 55.5%; ▌Lowell Blanchard (Democratic) 44.5%
Tennessee 3	Estes Kefauver	Democratic	1939 (special)	Incumbent re-elected.	▌ ✓ Estes Kefauver (Democratic) 67.8%; ▌Foster Johnson (Republican) 24.1%; ▌Ernest W. Forstner (Independent) 8.1%
Tennessee 4	Albert Gore Sr.	Democratic	1938	Incumbent re-elected.	▌ ✓ Albert Gore Sr. (Democratic) 65.1%; ▌E. M. Shelley (Republican) 30.4%; ▌E. H. McLean (Independent) 4.5%
Tennessee 5	Jim Nance McCord	Democratic	1942	Incumbent retired to run for Governor of Tennessee. Democratic hold.	▌ ✓ Harold Earthman (Democratic) 85.5%; ▌W. H. Crowell (Republican) 14.5%
Tennessee 6	Percy Priest	Democratic	1940	Incumbent re-elected.	▌ ✓ Percy Priest (Democratic) 97.0%; ▌D. C. Loftis (Independent) 3.0%
Tennessee 7	W. Wirt Courtney	Democratic	1939 (special)	Incumbent re-elected.	▌ ✓ W. Wirt Courtney (Democratic); Uncontested
Tennessee 8	Tom J. Murray	Democratic	1942	Incumbent re-elected.	▌ ✓ Tom J. Murray (Democratic) 63.3%; ▌A. Bradley Frazier (Republican) 36.7%
Tennessee 9	Jere Cooper	Democratic	1928	Incumbent re-elected.	▌ ✓ Jere Cooper (Democratic) 87.8%; ▌Homer Latum (Independent) 12.2%
Tennessee 10	Clifford Davis	Democratic	1940	Incumbent re-elected.	▌ ✓ Clifford Davis (Democratic); Uncontested

== Texas ==
District	Incumbent			This race	
District	Member	Party	First elected	Results	Candidates
Texas 1	Wright Patman	Democratic	1928	Incumbent re-elected.	▌ ✓ Wright Patman (Democratic); Uncontested
Texas 2	Martin Dies Jr.	Democratic	1930	Incumbent retired. Democratic hold.	▌ ✓ Jesse M. Combs (Democratic) 94.0%; ▌Lamar Cecil (Republican) 6.0%
Texas 3	Lindley Beckworth	Democratic	1938	Incumbent re-elected.	▌ ✓ Lindley Beckworth (Democratic) 93.2%; ▌O. P. Stephens (Republican) 6.8%
Texas 4	Sam Rayburn	Democratic	1912	Incumbent re-elected.	▌ ✓ Sam Rayburn (Democratic); Uncontested
Texas 5	Hatton W. Sumners	Democratic	1914	Incumbent re-elected.	▌ ✓ Hatton W. Sumners (Democratic) 71.4%; ▌Charles D. Turner (Republican) 28.6%
Texas 6	Luther A. Johnson	Democratic	1922	Incumbent re-elected.	▌ ✓ Luther A. Johnson (Democratic) 100.0%; ▌Charles W. Beck (Republican) 0.02%
Texas 7	Nat Patton	Democratic	1934	Incumbent lost renomination. Democratic hold.	▌ ✓ Tom Pickett (Democratic) 96.1%; ▌J. Perrin Willis (Republican) 3.9%
Texas 8	Albert Thomas	Democratic	1936	Incumbent re-elected.	▌ ✓ Albert Thomas (Democratic) 92.3%; ▌Lester B. Robinson (Republican) 7.7%
Texas 9	Joseph J. Mansfield	Democratic	1916	Incumbent re-elected.	▌ ✓ Joseph J. Mansfield (Democratic) 93.4%; ▌Lewis Allen (Republican) 6.6%
Texas 10	Lyndon B. Johnson	Democratic	1937 (special)	Incumbent re-elected.	▌ ✓ Lyndon B. Johnson (Democratic) 93.2%; ▌Arthur H. Bartelt (Republican) 6.8%
Texas 11	William R. Poage	Democratic	1936	Incumbent re-elected.	▌ ✓ William R. Poage (Democratic) 94.9%; ▌Charles R. Nelson (Republican) 5.1%
Texas 12	Fritz G. Lanham	Democratic	1919 (special)	Incumbent re-elected.	▌ ✓ Fritz G. Lanham (Democratic); Uncontested
Texas 13	Ed Gossett	Democratic	1938	Incumbent re-elected.	▌ ✓ Ed Gossett (Democratic) 95.4%; ▌L. C. Harper (Republican) 4.6%
Texas 14	Richard M. Kleberg	Democratic	1931 (special)	Incumbent lost renomination. Democratic hold.	▌ ✓ John E. Lyle Jr. (Democratic); Uncontested
Texas 15	Milton H. West	Democratic	1933 (special)	Incumbent re-elected.	▌ ✓ Milton H. West (Democratic); Uncontested
Texas 16	R. Ewing Thomason	Democratic	1930	Incumbent re-elected.	▌ ✓ R. Ewing Thomason (Democratic); Uncontested
Texas 17	Sam M. Russell	Democratic	1940	Incumbent re-elected.	▌ ✓ Sam M. Russell (Democratic) 96.8%; ▌Clifton Woody (Republican) 3.2%
Texas 18	Eugene Worley	Democratic	1940	Incumbent re-elected.	▌ ✓ Eugene Worley (Democratic) 93.1%; ▌McD. Bybee (Republican) 6.9%
Texas 19	George H. Mahon	Democratic	1934	Incumbent re-elected.	▌ ✓ George H. Mahon (Democratic); Uncontested
Texas 20	Paul J. Kilday	Democratic	1938	Incumbent re-elected.	▌ ✓ Paul J. Kilday (Democratic); Uncontested
Texas 21	O. C. Fisher	Democratic	1942	Incumbent re-elected.	▌ ✓ O. C. Fisher (Democratic) 89.7%; ▌Maurice J. Lehman (Republican) 10.3%

== Utah ==
District	Incumbent			This race	
District	Member	Party	First elected	Results	Candidates
Utah 1	Walter K. Granger	Democratic	1940	Incumbent re-elected.	▌ ✓ Walter K. Granger (Democratic) 57.8%; ▌B. H. Stringham (Republican) 42.2%
Utah 2	J. W. Robinson	Democratic	1932	Incumbent re-elected.	▌ ✓ J. W. Robinson (Democratic) 62.3%; ▌Quayle Cannon Jr. (Republican) 37.7%

== Vermont ==
District	Incumbent			This race	
District	Member	Party	First elected	Results	Candidates
Vermont at-large	Charles A. Plumley	Republican	1934	Incumbent re-elected.	▌ ✓ Charles A. Plumley (Republican) 62.4%; ▌Robert W. Ready (Democratic) 37.6%

== Virginia ==
District	Incumbent			This race	
District	Member	Party	First elected	Results	Candidates
Virginia 1	S. Otis Bland	Democratic	1918	Incumbent re-elected.	▌ ✓ S. Otis Bland (Democratic) 81.2%; ▌Walter Johnson (Republican) 18.8%
Virginia 2	Vacant			Winder R. Harris (D) resigned September 15, 1944. Democratic hold.	▌ ✓ Ralph Hunter Daughton (Democratic) 57.7%; ▌Thomas L. Woodward (Republican) 25.2%; ▌W. B. Schafer Jr. (Independent) 17.1%
Virginia 3	Dave E. Satterfield Jr.	Democratic	1937 (special)	Incumbent re-elected.	▌ ✓ Dave E. Satterfield Jr. (Democratic); Uncontested
Virginia 4	Patrick H. Drewry	Democratic	1920	Incumbent re-elected.	▌ ✓ Patrick H. Drewry (Democratic); Uncontested
Virginia 5	Thomas G. Burch	Democratic	1930	Incumbent re-elected.	▌ ✓ Thomas G. Burch (Democratic) 84.6%; ▌Howard H. Carwile (Independent) 15.4%
Virginia 6	Clifton A. Woodrum	Democratic	1922	Incumbent re-elected.	▌ ✓ Clifton A. Woodrum (Democratic) 68.7%; ▌John Strickler (Republican) 30.8%; ▌Ruby Mae Wilkes (Socialist) 0.5%
Virginia 7	A. Willis Robertson	Democratic	1932	Incumbent re-elected.	▌ ✓ A. Willis Robertson (Democratic) 59.9%; ▌D. Wampler Earman (Republican) 40.1%
Virginia 8	Howard W. Smith	Democratic	1930	Incumbent re-elected.	▌ ✓ Howard W. Smith (Democratic) 60.1%; ▌Elizabeth Chilton Murray (Ind. Democratic) 21.0%; ▌Lawrence Michael (Ind. Republican) 17.2%; ▌Clarke T. Robb (Socialist) 1.8%
Virginia 9	John W. Flannagan Jr.	Democratic	1930	Incumbent re-elected.	▌ ✓ John W. Flannagan Jr. (Democratic) 56.3%; ▌Ralph L. Lincoln (Republican) 43.7%

== Washington ==
District	Incumbent			This race	
District	Member	Party	First elected	Results	Candidates
Washington 1	Warren Magnuson	Democratic	1936	Incumbent retired to run for U.S. senator. Democratic hold.	▌ ✓ Hugh De Lacy (Democratic) 53.1%; ▌Robert H. Harlin (Republican) 46.2%; ▌Jack R. Hopkins (Socialist) 0.4%; ▌Herbert W. Brougham (Prohibition) 0.3%
Washington 2	Henry M. Jackson	Democratic	1940	Incumbent re-elected.	▌ ✓ Henry M. Jackson (Democratic) 60.4%; ▌Payson Peterson (Republican) 39.6%
Washington 3	Fred B. Norman	Republican	1942	Incumbent lost re-election. Democratic gain.	▌ ✓ Charles R. Savage (Democratic) 52.0%; ▌Fred B. Norman (Republican) 48.0%
Washington 4	Hal Holmes	Republican	1942	Incumbent re-elected.	▌ ✓ Hal Holmes (Republican) 60.2%; ▌Al McCoy (Democratic) 39.8%
Washington 5	Walt Horan	Republican	1942	Incumbent re-elected.	▌ ✓ Walt Horan (Republican) 52.3%; ▌Edward J. Reilly (Democratic) 47.7%
Washington 6	John M. Coffee	Democratic	1936	Incumbent re-elected.	▌ ✓ John M. Coffee (Democratic) 61.2%; ▌Thor C. Tollefson (Republican) 38.8%

== West Virginia ==
District	Incumbent			This race	
District	Member	Party	First elected	Results	Candidates
West Virginia 1	A. C. Schiffler	Republican	1942	Incumbent lost re-election. Democratic gain.	▌ ✓ Matthew M. Neely (Democratic) 50.4%; ▌A. C. Schiffler (Republican) 49.6%
West Virginia 2	Jennings Randolph	Democratic	1932	Incumbent re-elected.	▌ ✓ Jennings Randolph (Democratic) 54.1%; ▌Melvin C. Muntzing (Republican) 45.9%
West Virginia 3	Edward G. Rohrbough	Republican	1942	Incumbent lost re-election. Democratic gain.	▌ ✓ Cleveland M. Bailey (Democratic) 52.5%; ▌Edward G. Rohrbough (Republican) 47.5%
West Virginia 4	Hubert S. Ellis	Republican	1942	Incumbent re-elected.	▌ ✓ Hubert S. Ellis (Republican) 51.2%; ▌E. B. Pennybacker (Democratic) 48.8%
West Virginia 5	John Kee	Democratic	1932	Incumbent re-elected.	▌ ✓ John Kee (Democratic) 61.7%; ▌Hartley Sanders (Republican) 38.3%
West Virginia 6	Joe L. Smith	Democratic	1928	Incumbent retired. Democratic hold.	▌ ✓ E. H. Hedrick (Democratic) 58.3%; ▌J. W. Maxwell (Republican) 41.7%

== Wisconsin ==
District	Incumbent			This race	
District	Member	Party	First elected	Results	Candidates
Wisconsin 1	Lawrence H. Smith	Republican	1941 (special)	Incumbent re-elected.	▌ ✓ Lawrence H. Smith (Republican) 74.8%; ▌John K. Kyle (Progressive) 24.2%; ▌Victor Cooks (Social-Democratic) 1.0%
Wisconsin 2	Harry Sauthoff	Progressive	1940	Incumbent retired to run for U.S. senator. Republican gain.	▌ ✓ Robert Kirkland Henry (Republican) 56.8%; ▌John W. Nash (Democratic) 25.9%; ▌Herbert C. Schenk (Progressive) 16.7%; ▌Margaret D. Gray (Social-Democratic) 0.6%
Wisconsin 3	William H. Stevenson	Republican	1940	Incumbent re-elected.	▌ ✓ William H. Stevenson (Republican) 69.9%; ▌William D. Carroll (Democratic) 25.4%; ▌Olaf H. Johnson (Independent) 4.3%; ▌Fred A. Dahir (Social-Democratic) 0.3%
Wisconsin 4	Thad F. Wasielewski	Democratic	1940	Incumbent re-elected.	▌ ✓ Thad F. Wasielewski (Democratic) 63.5%; ▌Robert Blackwood (Republican) 33.9%; ▌Stanley Budny (Social-Democratic) 2.6%
Wisconsin 5	Howard J. McMurray	Democratic	1942	Incumbent retired to run for U.S. senator. Democratic hold.	▌ ✓ Andrew Biemiller (Democratic) 50.8%; ▌Lewis D. Thill (Republican) 45.2%; ▌Edwin W. Knappe (Social-Democratic) 2.7%; ▌Irvin I. Aaron (Independent) 1.2%
Wisconsin 6	Frank B. Keefe	Republican	1938	Incumbent re-elected.	▌ ✓ Frank B. Keefe (Republican) 66.5%; ▌Henry Danes (Democratic) 32.3%; ▌John C. Boll (Social-Democratic) 1.1%
Wisconsin 7	Reid F. Murray	Republican	1938	Incumbent re-elected.	▌ ✓ Reid F. Murray (Republican) 69.3%; ▌William H. Ludwig (Democratic) 30.1%; ▌Lewis Frick (Social-Democratic) 0.6%
Wisconsin 8	LaVern Dilweg	Democratic	1942	Incumbent lost re-election. Republican gain.	▌ ✓ John W. Byrnes (Republican) 51.1%; ▌LaVern Dilweg (Democratic) 45.5%; ▌Frederick W. Giese (Progressive) 3.4%
Wisconsin 9	Merlin Hull	Progressive	1934	Incumbent re-elected.	▌ ✓ Merlin Hull (Progressive) 98.5%; ▌Adolph Maassen (Social-Democratic) 1.5%
Wisconsin 10	Alvin O'Konski	Republican	1942	Incumbent re-elected.	▌ ✓ Alvin O'Konski (Republican) 57.8%; ▌Elizabeth Hawkes (Democratic) 31.4%; ▌Harry P. Van Guilder (Progressive) 10.1%; ▌Adolph F. Kreie (Social-Democratic) 0.6%

== Wyoming ==
District	Incumbent			This race	
District	Member	Party	First elected	Results	Candidates
Wyoming at-large	Frank A. Barrett	Republican	1942	Incumbent re-elected.	▌ ✓ Frank A. Barrett (Republican) 55.7%; ▌Charles E. Norris (Democratic) 44.3%

== Non-voting delegates ==
District	Incumbent			This race	
District	Delegate	Party	First elected	Results	Candidates
Alaska Territory at-large	Anthony Dimond	Democratic	1932	Incumbent retired to become a judge. New member elected September 13, 1944. Democratic hold.	▌ ✓ Bob Bartlett (Democratic) 65.84%; ▌John E. Manders (Republican) 34.16%
Hawaii Territory at-large	Joseph R. Farrington	Republican	1942	Incumbent re-elected.	▌ ✓ Joseph R. Farrington (Republican); Uncontested
Philippines at-large	Joaquín Miguel Elizalde	Nonpartisan	Appointed 1938	Incumbent resigned August 9, 1944. New Resident commissioner appointed. Liberal gain. Successor was to hold office at the pleasure of the President of the Philippines.	▌ ✓ Carlos P. Romulo (Liberal)

== See also ==
- 1944 United States elections
  - 1944 United States Senate elections
  - 1944 United States presidential election
- 78th United States Congress
- 79th United States Congress
