= 1942 United States House of Representatives elections in Florida =

- November 3, 1942

All 6 Florida seats to the United States House of Representatives
	Majority party	Minority party
Party	Democratic	Republican
Last election	5	0
Seats won	6	0
Popular vote	94,459	12,631
Percentage	88.18%	11.79%
- Results by district Democratic: 70–80% 80–90% >90%

The 1942 United States House of Representatives Elections in Florida were held on November 3, 1942, to determine who would represent the state of Florida in the United States House of Representatives. Representatives are elected for two-year terms; those elected served in the 78th Congress from January 1943 until January 1945. Florida had 6 seats including one at-large district due to redistricting.

The Democratic party held on to all their seats in Florida. The Republican Party only ran candidates in two districts the 4th and 5th districts.

== Statewide ==
Popular vote
Democratic	88.18%
Republican	11.79%
Other	0.03%

House seats
Democratic	100%

== First District ==
Florida's 1st congressional district, 1942
Party	Candidate	Votes	%
Democratic	J. Hardin Peterson (Incumbent)	25,037	99.94
Independent	Scattering	14	0.06
Total votes		25,051	100.00
Democratic hold			

== Second District ==
Florida's 2nd congressional district, 1942
Party	Candidate	Votes	%
Democratic	Emory H. Price	15,777	99.97
Independent	Scattering	5	0.03
Total votes		15,782	100.00
Democratic hold			

=== Democratic primary ===
Democratic primary results
Party	Candidate	Votes	%
Democratic	Jim Cary	16,506	28.72
Democratic	Emory H. Price	15,435	26.85
Democratic	Zach H. Douglas	12,766	22.21
Democratic	James R. Boyd, Jr.	8,923	15.52
Democratic	Helen Hunt West	2,142	3.73
Democratic	T. W. Parsons, Jr.	1,707	2.97
Total votes		57,479	100.00

=== Democratic primary runoff ===
Democratic primary results
Party	Candidate	Votes	%
Democratic	Emory H. Price	24,143	50.60
Democratic	Jim Cary	23,575	49.41
Total votes		47,718	100.00

== Third District ==
Florida's 3rd congressional district, 1942
Party	Candidate	Votes	%
Democratic	Bob Sikes (Incumbent)	11,739	100.00
Total votes		11,739	100.00
Democratic hold			

=== Democratic primary ===
Democratic primary results
Party	Candidate	Votes	%
Democratic	Bob Sikes (Incumbent)	37,641	75.28
Democratic	J. B. Lahan	12,362	24.72
Total votes		50,003	100.00

== Fourth District ==
Florida's 4th congressional district, 1942
Party	Candidate	Votes	%
Democratic	Pat Cannon (Incumbent)	25,056	81.40
Republican	Bert L. Acker	5,725	18.60
Total votes		30,781	100.00
Democratic hold			

=== Democratic primary ===
4th district primary results Cannon: 50–60% 60–70% 80–90% Paty: 40–50% Hamilton: 40–50%

Democratic primary results
Party	Candidate	Votes	%
Democratic	Pat Cannon (Incumbent)	37,366	54.14
Democratic	B. F. Paty	20,058	29.06
Democratic	Edgar G. Hamilton	5,669	8.21
Democratic	Louis F. Maire	4,369	6.33
Democratic	Lew Sevier	1,554	2.25
Total votes		69,016	100.00

== Fifth District ==
Florida's 5th congressional district, 1942
Party	Candidate	Votes	%
Democratic	Joe Hendricks (Incumbent)	16,850	70.93
Republican	Emory S. Akerman	6,906	29.07
Total votes		31,962	100.00
Democratic hold			

=== Democratic primary ===
Democratic primary results
Party	Candidate	Votes	%
Democratic	Joe Hendricks (Incumbent)	37,366	66.92
Democratic	John R. Parkinson	20,058	27.35
Democratic	Ed Sims	2,639	5.73
Total votes		46,044	100.00

== At-Large District ==
Florida's at-large congressional district, 1942
Party	Candidate	Votes	%
Democratic	Robert A. Green	91,120	100.00
Total votes		91,120	100.00
Democratic hold			

=== Democratic primary ===
Results by county: Green: 40–50%; 50–60%; 60–70%; 70–80%; 80–90%; Overstreet: 40–50%; 50–60%; 70–80%; Tervin: 40–50%

Democratic primary results
Party	Candidate	Votes	%
Democratic	Robert A. Green	133,347	51.55
Democratic	Earnest Overstreet	87,708	33.91
Democratic	Wallace Tervin	19,599	7.58
Democratic	Barney Cohen	18,014	6.96
Total votes		258,668	100.00
