= Joseph Hendricks =

Joseph Hendricks may refer to:

- Joe Hendricks (1903–1974), U.S. Representative from Florida
- Joseph Hendricks (footballer) (born 1979), Ghanaian footballer
- Joseph M. Hendricks, professor of Christian ethics at Mercer University
