= Lex Green =

Lex Green may refer to:

- Robert A. Green (1892–1973) — "Lex" Green, Florida Democratic U.S. Congressman and judge
- Lex Green (Illinois politician) (born 1954) — Illinois Libertarian politician and unelected candidate for governor
