= James J. Murphy =

American politician

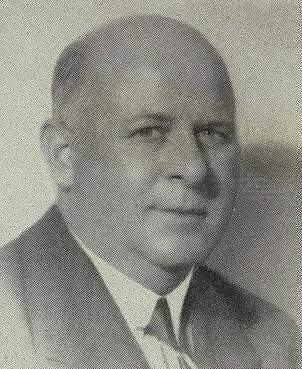

Member of the U.S. House of Representatives from New York's 16th district
- In office January 3, 1949 – January 3, 1953
- Preceded by: Ellsworth B. Buck
- Succeeded by: Adam Clayton Powell Jr.

Personal details
- Born: James Joseph Murphy; November 3, 1898 Brooklyn, New York, US
- Died: October 19, 1962 (aged 63) Staten Island, New York, US
- Resting place: St. Peter's Cemetery on Staten Island, New York
- Party: Democratic
- Profession: Businessman

James Joseph Murphy (November 3, 1898 – October 19, 1962) was an American businessman, World War I veteran, and politician who served two terms as a United States representative from New York from 1949 to 1953.

== Biography ==
He was born in Brooklyn, and educated in the public schools of Staten Island.

=== Military service ===
Murphy served as a noncommissioned officer with the 1st New York Cavalry on the Mexican border during the Pancho Villa Expedition in 1916. During World War I, he was a sergeant with the 104th Machine Gun Battalion, 27th Division, and served in France and Belgium.

=== Business ===
After the war, Murphy engaged in the import and export shipping business in New York City.

=== Political career ===
In 1948, Murphy was elected as a Democrat to the 81st Congress. He was reelected in 1950, and served from January 3, 1949 to January 3, 1953. He was an unsuccessful candidate for reelection in 1952.

Murphy served on the New York City Council from 1954 to 1957.

=== Later career and death ===
He was a freight and shipping broker and resided in the Grymes Hill area of Staten Island.

He died on Staten Island in 1962, and was buried at Saint Peter's Cemetery on Staten Island.

U.S. House of Representatives
Preceded by Ellsworth B. Buck	Member of the U.S. House of Representatives from New York's 16th congressional district 1949–1953	Succeeded by Adam Clayton Powell Jr.
Political offices
Preceded by Albert Maniscalco	New York City Council, 17th District; 1954–1958	Succeeded by Morris Stein
