= Frank Clark (politician) =

American politician

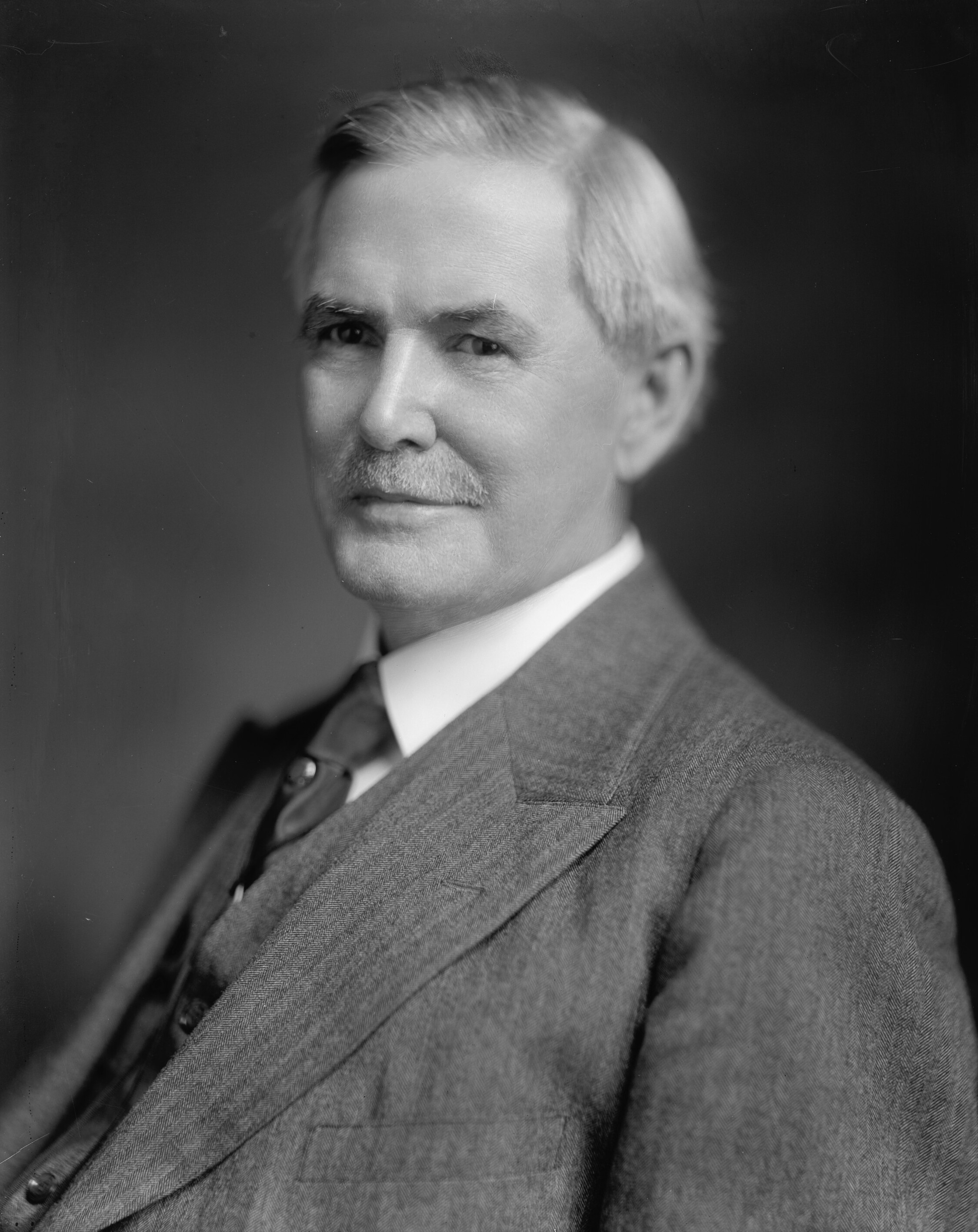
- Born: Frank A. Clark; March 28, 1860; Eufaula, Alabama, U.S.
- Died: April 14, 1936 (aged 76); Washington, D.C., U.S.

Frank Clark (March 28, 1860 – April 14, 1936) was an American lawyer and politician who served in public and private practice for some 50 years, including 20 years in the United States Congress.

Born in Eufaula, Alabama, Clark attended law school in Georgia and was admitted to the bar there in 1881, beginning in private practice in Newnan.

In 1884 he moved to Florida, where he spent most of his life as a politician and lawyer in public and private practice. One year later, Clark was elected city attorney of Bartow, Polk County, Florida, for 1885-86. He returned to private practicing for three years until winning the first of two two-year terms - ten years apart - in the Florida House of Representatives.

Between the end of his first term in 1891 and his re-election in 1899, Clark worked at his law practice in-between his 1893 appointed to a four-year term as assistant U.S. attorney for Southern Florida. He then moved to Jacksonville, Florida and resumed his law practice until being re-elected to the State House. In 1900, he was elected chair of the Florida Democratic Party.

When his second term ended in 1901, Clark spent four years in private practice before being elected to the U.S. House of Representatives. The highlight of his 20-year tenure was chairing the Committee on Public Buildings and Grounds from 1913 through 1919.

In 1908, Clark gave a speech voicing his strong support for a bill to segregate the streetcars in Washington, D.C., during which he praised segregation and espoused numerous racial stereotypes of African Americans which he believed made them inferior to whites, including that God had created them with "low brow, low order of intelligence, and repulsive features", that "The average negro is perfectly happy when he finds himself eating a watermelon or going on a railroad excursion.", and that while "the [railroad] cars furnished for negro passengers are just as good as those furnished for white passengers" they do not remain that way because "Imagine a nice, new passenger coach, packed with dirty, greasy, filthy negroes, down South, in midsummer, and you can readily understand why that car does not long remain as good, as clean, and as desirable as a similar car occupied exclusively by white travelers."

Clark ended his speech by saying that:

"This is our country, as it was the country of our fathers. The country of the white man, not the home of the mongrel. It will always be the white man's country. If the black man and the yellow man each desire to remain with us, occupying the sphere in life for which God Almighty intended each, let them do so. If not content with that, then let them go elsewhere."

In 1911, Clark proposed H.R. 2582, which read: "To prohibit the intermarriage of persons of the white and Negro races within the District of Columbia; to declare such contracts of marriage null and void; to prescribe punishments for violations and attempts to violate its provisions."

His congressional career ended in 1925 when, despite his history as state chairman, he failed to win his party's nomination to run.

Once again Clark resumed his law practice, this time in Miami. Three years later, in 1928, President Calvin Coolidge appointed him to the U.S. Tariff Commission, where he served for two years.

In 1930, at the age of 70, Clark remained in the nation's capital and returned to practicing law, but in 1933 he became attorney for the Bureau of Internal Revenue (predecessor to the Internal Revenue Service), serving until his death at age 76.

He was returned and interred in Bartow, Florida.

U.S. House of Representatives
Preceded by Robert Wyche Davis	U.S. Representative; Florida's 2nd congressional district 1905–1925	Succeeded by Robert A. Green
