= Joseph M. Hendricks =

Joseph Millard Hendricks was a Columbus Roberts Professor of Christian ethics at Mercer University in Georgia, United States. He attended Mercer University as an undergraduate, obtained a Master of Divinity degree at Southern Baptist Theological Seminary, a Doctor of Law degree at Atlanta Law School and a Doctor of Philosophy degree at Emory University. An American Civil rights activist, humanitarian and philanthropist, Hendricks served as the university marshal, dean of students and professor emeritus of Christianity at Mercer University at its Macon campus in Georgia. Hendricks, or "Papa Joe" as he is affectionately known, was instrumental in achieving desegregation at Mercer University and contributed immensely to efforts that advanced racial justice in Macon and Middle Georgia.
