= 1942 United States House of Representatives election in New Mexico =

1942 United States House of Representatives elections in New Mexico
- November 3, 1942
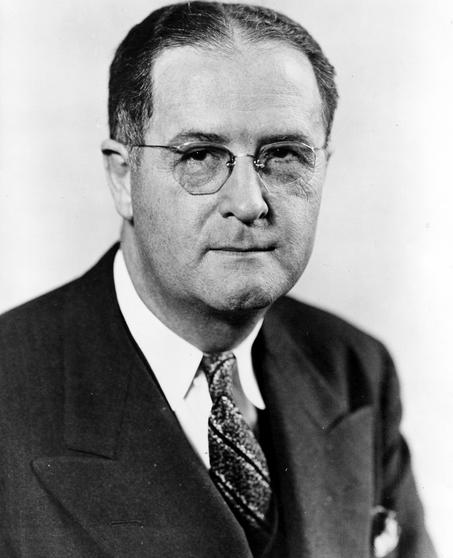

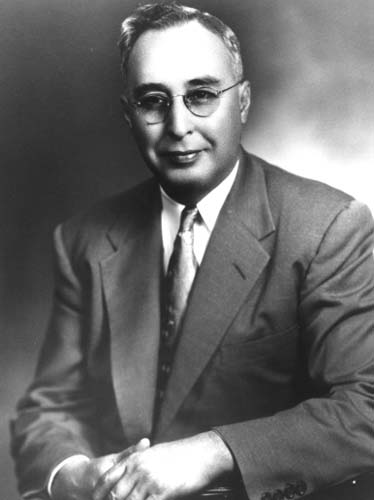

Nominee	Clinton Anderson	Antonio M. Fernández
Party	Democratic	Democratic
Popular vote	62,320	57,474
Percentage	30.2%	27.8%
Nominee	William A. Sutherland	Reese P. Fullerton
Party	Republican	Republican
Popular vote	43,627	43,071
Percentage	21.1%	20.9%
- County results Anderson: 30–40% 40–50% 50–60% Fernández: 20–30% Sutherland: 20–30% Fullerton: 20–30%

The 1942 United States House of Representatives election in New Mexico was held on Tuesday November 3, 1942 to elect the states two at-large representatives. New Mexico got another district due to the 1940 Census. Both representatives were elected at large. Democrats won both at large districts, making the state's delegation solely Democratic.

== Overview ==
United States House of Representatives elections in New Mexico, 1942
Party	Votes	Percentage	Seats	+/–
Democratic	119,794	58.18%	2	+1
Republican	86,098	41.82%	0	—
Totals	205,892	100.00%	2	—

== District 1 ==
New Mexico Seat A Results

New Mexico's 1st At-large congressional district election, 1942
Party	Candidate	Votes	%
Democratic	Clinton Anderson (incumbent)	62,320	58.82
Republican	William A. Sutherland	43,627	41.18
Total votes		105,947	100.00
Democratic hold			

== District 2 ==
New Mexico Seat B Results

New Mexico's 2nd At-large congressional district election, 1942
Party	Candidate	Votes	%
Democratic	Antonio M. Fernández	57,474	57.16
Republican	Reese P. Fullerton	43,071	42.84
Total votes		100,545	100.00
