= James A. O'Leary =

American politician

James A. O’Leary
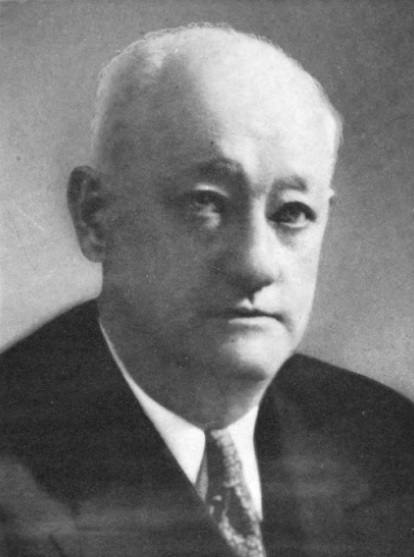

Member of the U.S. House of Representatives from New York's 11th district
- In office January 3, 1935 – March 16, 1944
- Preceded by: Anning Smith Prall
- Succeeded by: Ellsworth B. Buck

Personal details
- Born: James Aloysius O'Leary; April 23, 1889 Staten Island, New York, US
- Died: March 16, 1944 (aged 54) Staten Island, New York, US
- Party: Democratic

James Aloysius O'Leary (April 23, 1889 – March 16, 1944) was an American lawyer and businessman who served five terms as a Democratic member of the United States House of Representatives from New York from 1935 to 1944.

== Early life and career ==
O'Leary was born in New Brighton, Staten Island. He attended St. Peter's Academy, Augustinian Academy, and Westerleigh Collegiate Institute, and also studied law. He became active in the real estate and insurance businesses, and in 1917 he joined the North Shore Ice Company, of which he was general manager and vice president from 1920 to 1934.

== Political career ==
He unsuccessfully ran for a New York State Senate seat in 1930. He was elected to Congress in 1934 and served from January 3, 1935, until his death in 1944 in West New Brighton, Staten Island.

== Family ==
His great-grandson, Vito J. Fossella Jr., served as a Republican member of the United States House of Representatives representing New York's 13th congressional district from 1997 to 2009.

== See also ==
- List of members of the United States Congress who died in office (1900–1949)

== Sources ==
- United States Congress. "James A. O'Leary (id: O000065)". Biographical Directory of the United States Congress.
- James Aloysius O'Leary, Late a Representative. Washington, DC: US Government Printing Office. 1946.

U.S. House of Representatives
Preceded by Anning S. Prall	Member of the U.S. House of Representatives from New York's 11th congressional district 1935–1944	Succeeded by Ellsworth B. Buck
