= Ellsworth B. Buck =

American politician

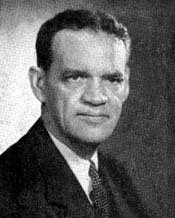

Member of the U.S. House of Representatives from New York
- In office June 6, 1944 – January 3, 1949
- Preceded by: James A. O'Leary
- Succeeded by: James J. Murphy
- Constituency: 11th district (1944–45); 16th district (1945–49)

Personal details
- Born: Ellsworth Brewer Buck; July 3, 1892 Chicago, Illinois
- Died: August 14, 1970 (aged 78) Stephenson, Wisconsin
- Resting place: Thunder Mountain Ranch Cemetery
- Party: Republican
- Spouse: Constance Tyler
- Education: Dartmouth College

Ellsworth Brewer Buck (July 3, 1892 – August 14, 1970) was an American businessman and educator who served three terms as a Republican member of the United States House of Representatives from New York during the 1940s.

== Early years ==
Buck was born in Chicago, Illinois and attended Morgan Park Academy. He graduated from Dartmouth College in 1914 and enlisted in the United States Naval Reserve in 1917. He became a meteorology instructor following his training at the Massachusetts Institute of Technology.

=== Early career ===
He moved to Staten Island in 1919 where he served as chairman of the board of L.A. Dreyfus Co. (before that chewing gum company moved to Edison, New Jersey and was subsequently purchased by Wrigley) Buck served as chairman of the Chewing Gum Code Authority from 1934 to 1935 and became a member of the New York City Board of Education in 1935. He was vice president of the New York City Board of Education from 1938 until 1942, and president from 1942 until 1944.

== Political career ==
Buck was elected to Congress in 1944 to fill the vacancy caused by the death of James A. O'Leary. He served from June 6, 1944 until January 3, 1949, serving in the Seventy-eighth United States Congress, Seventy-ninth United States Congress and Eightieth United States Congress. While in Congress, Buck strongly backed the Taft-Hartley Act, opposed by organized labor; and voted in favor of a proposal to ban the poll tax, a device which kept southern blacks from voting. He did not run for reelection in 1948. Also, while representing Staten Island, he was an opponent of the establishment of the Fresh Kills Landfill.

== Retirement ==
On April 5, 1949, months following his retirement from Congress, Buck was shot and seriously wounded by a gunman while crossing the street on Stuyvesant Place outside Staten Island Borough Hall. The assailant, Charles Van Newkirk, was a dismissed Merchant Marine engineer who was disgruntled after Buck, as chairman of a House Education and Labor subcommittee, denied his appeal to regain his position.

Following his recovery, Buck served as a delegate to the 1952 Republican National Convention. He was director of the Office of Trade Investment and Monetary Affairs in 1954, and was public advisor of the United States delegation to the United Nations Economic and Social Council in Geneva, Switzerland in 1955.

== Death and burial ==
Buck died at his home in Stephenson, Wisconsin in 1970 and was cremated. His ashes were placed in Thunder Mountain Ranch Cemetery.

U.S. House of Representatives
Preceded by James A. O'Leary	Member of the U.S. House of Representatives from New York's 11th congressional district 1944–1945	Succeeded by James J. Heffernan
Preceded by James H. Fay	Member of the U.S. House of Representatives from New York's 16th congressional district 1945–1949	Succeeded by James J. Murphy
