= Emory H. Price =

American politician

Emory Hilliard Price
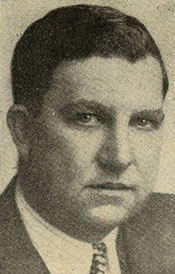

Member of the U.S. House of Representatives from Florida's 2nd district
- In office January 3, 1943 – January 3, 1949
- Preceded by: Robert A. Green
- Succeeded by: Charles Edward Bennett

Personal details
- Born: December 3, 1899 Bostwick, Florida, U.S.
- Died: February 11, 1976 (aged 76) Jacksonville, Florida, U.S.
- Party: Democratic

Emory Hilliard Price (December 3, 1899 – February 11, 1976) was a U.S. representative from Florida.

== Biography ==
Born in Bostwick, Florida, Price attended the public schools of Duval County, Florida. He graduated from Jacksonville (Florida) Law College in 1936. He was admitted to the bar the same year and commenced practice in Jacksonville, Florida.

== Political career ==
He served as member of the city council of Jacksonville from 1929 to 1932. Price was the Supervisor of Registration of Duval County from 1932 to 1942.

=== Congress ===
Price was elected as a Democrat to the Seventy-eighth and to the two succeeding Congresses (January 3, 1943 – January 3, 1949). He was an unsuccessful candidate for renomination in 1948 to the Eighty-first Congress. After leaving Congress, he resumed the practice of law and real estate pursuits.

== Death ==
He died in Jacksonville on February 11, 1976, and was buried in Greenlawn Cemetery.

U.S. House of Representatives
Preceded by Robert A. Green	Member of the U.S. House of Representatives from Florida's 2nd congressional district 1943 – 1949	Succeeded by Charles E. Bennett
