= Joe Hendricks =

American politician

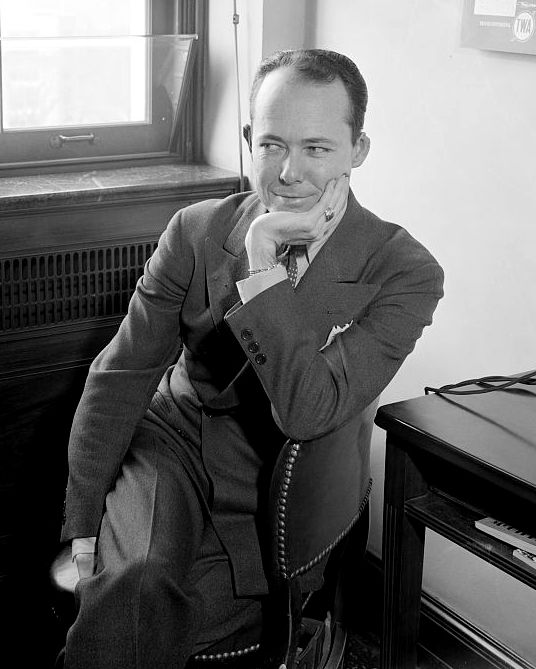

Member of the U.S. House of Representatives from Florida's 5th district
- In office January 3, 1937 – January 3, 1949
- Preceded by: District established
- Succeeded by: Syd Herlong

Personal details
- Born: Joseph Edward Hendricks; September 24, 1903 Lake Butler, Union County, Florida
- Died: October 20, 1974 (aged 71) Lakeland, Florida
- Resting place: Lakeland Memorial Cemetery
- Party: Democratic
- Profession: Lawyer

Joseph Edward Hendricks (September 24, 1903 – October 20, 1974) was an American lawyer and politician who served six terms as a United States representative from Florida from 1937 to 1949.

== Early life and career ==
Joe Hendricks was born at Lake Butler, Union County, Florida, where he attended the rural schools and Montverde School. He also attended Stetson University in DeLand, Florida, and graduated with an undergraduate degree in 1930 and a graduate degree from its law department in 1934. Hendricks was admitted to the bar in 1934 and commenced practice in DeLand, Florida.

Hendricks was an attorney for the legal tax survey of Florida in 1934.

== Congress ==
He was elected as a Democrat to the Seventy-fifth and to the five succeeding Congresses (January 3, 1937 – January 3, 1949) and was not a candidate for renomination in 1948 to the Eighty-first Congress.

== Later career and death ==
After leaving Congress, he was president of Hendricks Homes, Inc. and chairman of the Planning Board, Plant City, Florida. He was also a member of the County Planning Commission, Hillsborough County, Florida.

He resided in Plant City, Florida until his death in Lakeland, Florida, in 1974. He was buried in Lakeland Memorial Cemetery.

U.S. House of Representatives
Preceded by New district	Member of the U.S. House of Representatives from Florida's 5th congressional district 1937-1949	Succeeded by Syd Herlong
