= Robert A. Green =

American politician

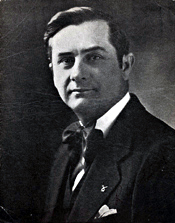

Member of the U.S. House of Representatives from Florida
- In office March 4, 1925 – November 25, 1944
- Preceded by: Frank Clark
- Succeeded by: Vacant until seat abolished
- Constituency: 2nd district (1925–43); At-large (1943–44)

Member of the Florida House of Representatives
- In office 1918–1920

Personal details
- Born: February 10, 1892
- Died: February 9, 1973 (aged 80)
- Party: Democratic

Robert Alexis (Lex) Green (February 10, 1892 – February 9, 1973) was an American educator, lawyer, jurist, and politician who served as a U.S. representative from Florida from 1925 to 1944.

== Early life and career ==
Green was born near Lake Butler, Bradford County (now Union County), Florida, where he attended the rural schools. He commenced teaching in the Liberty Public School at the age of 16. He was graduated from the high school at Lake Butler in 1913.

He served as a messenger in the State house of representatives from 1913 to 1915, then was an assistant chief clerk of the State house of representatives from 1915 to 1917 and chief clerk in 1917 and 1918.

He attended the University of Florida at Gainesville in 1916, then studied accounting and business administration at Howard College [now Samford University].

He returned to Florida to become a principal at Suwannee High School in 1916 and 1917.

He served as vice president of the Florida Educational Association in 1918, then as a member of the State house of representatives from 1918 to 1920, serving as speaker pro tempore in 1918.

He studied law at Yale University and was admitted to the bar in 1921 and commenced practice in Starke, Fla.

Green was elected judge of Bradford County, Florida in 1921 and served until 1924, when he resigned, having been elected to Congress.

== Congress ==
Green was elected as a Democrat to the Sixty-ninth Congress. He was reelected to the nine succeeding Congresses and served from March 4, 1925, until his resignation on November 25, 1944, to enter the United States Navy.

He served as chairman of the Committee on Territories (Seventy-third through Seventy-eighth Congresses). He was not a candidate for renomination in 1944 to the Seventy-ninth Congress, but was an unsuccessful candidate for the Florida gubernatorial nomination.

== Military service and later career ==
Green served as a lieutenant commander in the United States Navy from November 25, 1944, to November 2, 1945, and resumed the practice of law at Starke, Florida, and served as county prosecuting attorney and as city attorney for the city of Starke. He was member of the Democratic Executive committee, Bradford County, and State Democratic Executive committee.

== Death ==
Green died February 9, 1973, in Gainesville, Florida and was interred in New River Cemetery in Bradford County near the community of New River, Florida.

U.S. House of Representatives
| Preceded by Frank Clark | Member of the U.S. House of Representatives from Florida's 2nd congressional district 1925 – 1943 | Succeeded by Emory H. Price |
| Preceded by Seat inactive | Member of the U.S. House of Representatives from Florida's at-large congressional district 1943 – 1944 | Succeeded by Seat eliminated |
