= 1950 United States House of Representatives elections =

House elections for the 82nd U.S. Congress

- November 7, 1950 (Note: September 11, 1950 in Maine)

All 435 seats in the United States House of Representatives 218 seats needed for a majority
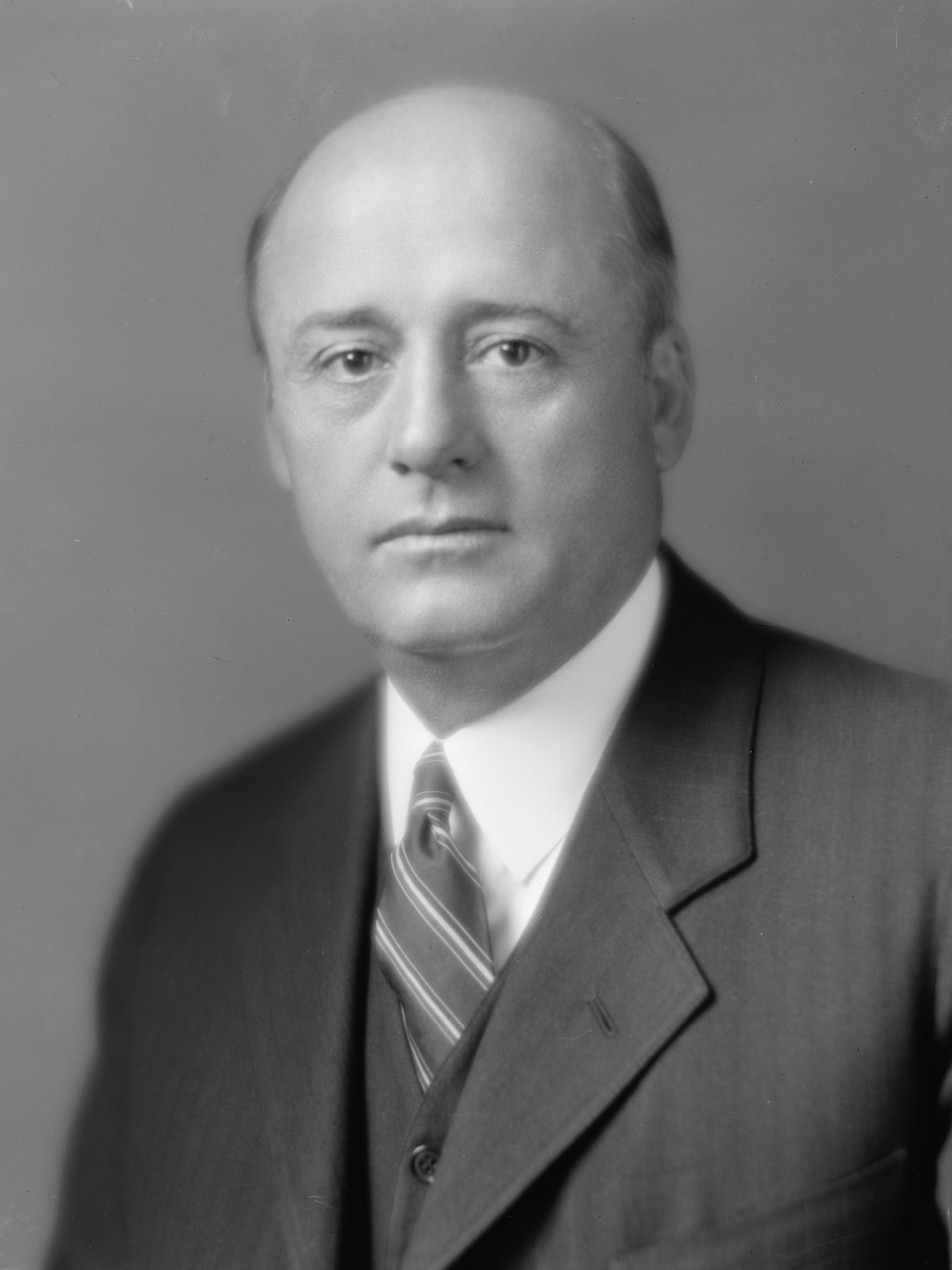

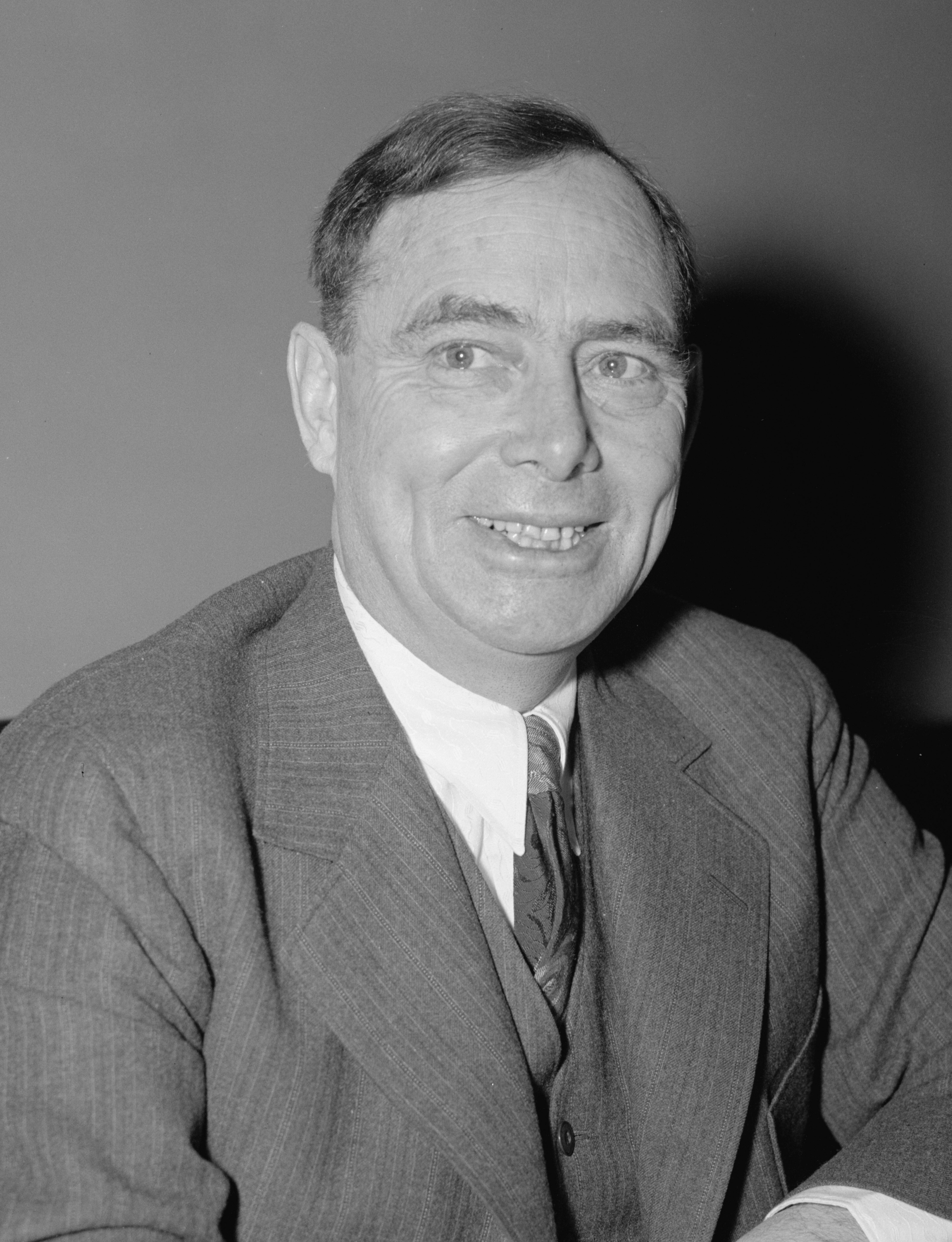
	Majority party	Minority party
Leader	Sam Rayburn	Joseph Martin
Party	Democratic	Republican
Leader since	September 16, 1940	January 3, 1939
Leader's seat	Texas 4th	Massachusetts 14th
Last election	263 seats	171 seats
Seats won	235	199
Seat change	▼28	▲28
Popular vote	19,991,683	19,735,173
Percentage	49.6%	48.9%
Swing	▼3.0pp	▲3.5pp
	Third party	Fourth party
Party	Independent	American Labor
Last election	0 seats	1 seat
Seats won	1	0
Seat change	▲1	▼1
Popular vote	119,634	225,368
Percentage	0.3%	0.6%
Swing	▲0.2pp	▼0.3pp
Speaker before election
Sam Rayburn
Democratic
Elected Speaker
Sam Rayburn
Democratic

The 1950 United States House of Representatives elections was an election for the United States House of Representatives to elect members to serve in the 82nd United States Congress. They were held for the most part on November 7, 1950, while Maine held theirs on September 11. These elections occurred in the middle of President Harry S. Truman's second term.

As the Korean War began and Truman's personal popularity plummeted for a second time during his presidency, his Democratic Party lost a net 28 seats to the Republican Party. This was the first election since 1908 where no third parties acquired any seats in the House.

== Special elections ==
There were six special elections throughout the year, listed here by date and district.

District	Incumbent			This race	
District	Representative	Party	First elected	Results	Candidates
New Jersey 7	J. Parnell Thomas	Republican	1936	Incumbent resigned January 2, 1950. New member elected February 6, 1950. Republican hold. Successor was re-elected in November.	▌ ✓ William B. Widnall (Republican) 67.5%; ▌John T. English (Democratic) 32.5%
Massachusetts 6	George J. Bates	Republican	1936	Incumbent died November 1, 1949. New member elected February 14, 1950. Republican hold. Winner was later re-elected to the next term; see below.	▌ ✓ William H. Bates (Republican) 72.7%; ▌Richard M. Russell (Democratic) 27.1%; ▌Others (write-in) 0.2%
Virginia 1	S. Otis Bland	Democratic	1918 (special)	Incumbent died February 16, 1950. New member elected May 2, 1950. Democratic hold. Winner was later re-elected to the next term; see below.	▌ ✓ Edward J. Robeson Jr. (Democratic) 42.5%; ▌ William A. Wright (Democratic) 29.6%; ▌ Blake T. Newton (Democratic) 21.0%; ▌ William A. Wright (Republican) 6.9%
Texas 18	Eugene Worley	Democratic	1940	Incumbent resigned April 3, 1950. New member elected May 6, 1950. Republican gain. Winner later lost re-election to the next term; see below.	▌ ✓ Ben H. Guill (Republican) 23.2%; ▌Alvatene Clark (Democratic) 17.1%; ▌J. Blake Timmons (Democratic) 15.3%; ▌Walter E. Rogers (Democratic) 14.9%; ▌LeRoy LeMaster (Democratic) 9.9%; ▌Ronald Davis (Democratic) 9.9%; ▌E. T. Burke (Democratic) 6.6%; ▌Talma Smith (Democratic) 3.2%; Others: ▌Ben Pickel (Democratic) 1.3%; ▌Woodrow W. Montgomery (Democratic) 0.6%; ▌Hule H. Bice (Democratic) 0.3%
Kansas 3	Herbert A. Meyer	Democratic	1946	Incumbent died August 31, 1950. New member elected November 7, 1950. Republican hold. Winner was also elected to the next term; see below.	▌ ✓ Myron V. George (Republican) 54.5%; ▌Barnes Griffith (Democratic) 45.5%
North Carolina 11	Alfred L. Bulwinkle	Democratic	1920; 1928 (lost); 1930	Incumbent died August 31, 1950. New member elected November 7, 1950. Democratic hold. Winner was also elected to the next term; see below.	▌ ✓ Woodrow W. Jones (Democratic) 67.3%; ▌A. W. Whitehurst (Republican) 32.7%

== Overall results ==
↓
235	1	199
Democratic	I	Republican

Party	Total seats	Change	Seat percentage	Vote percentage	Popular vote
Democratic Party	235	-28	54.0%	49.6%	19,991,683
Republican Party	199	+28	45.7%	48.9%	19,735,173
American Labor Party	0	-1	0.0%	0.6%	225,368
Progressive Party	0	-	0.0%	0.3%	127,715
Independents	1	+1	0.2%	0.3%	119,634
Liberal Party	0	-1	0.0%	0.2%	87,827
Prohibition Party	0	-	0.0%	0.1%	34,761
Independent People's Choice Party	0	-	0.0%	<0.1%	7,072
Socialist Party	0	-	0.0%	<0.1%	4,626
Socialist Workers Party	0	-	0.0%	<0.1%	2,484
Social Democratic Party	0	-	0.0%	<0.1%	1,803
Constitutional Party	0	-	0.0%	<0.1%	865
Christian Nationalist Party	0	-	0.0%	<0.1%	594
Fusion Party	0	-	0.0%	<0.1%	426
States' Rights Democratic Party	0	-	0.0%	<0.1%	147
Others	0	-	0.0%	<0.1%	1,705
Totals	435	+0	100.0%	100.0%	40,341,883

Source: Election Statistics - Office of the Clerk

Popular vote
Democratic	49.56%
Republican	48.92%
American Labor	0.56%
Others	0.96%

House seats
Democratic	54.02%
Republican	45.75%
Others	0.23%

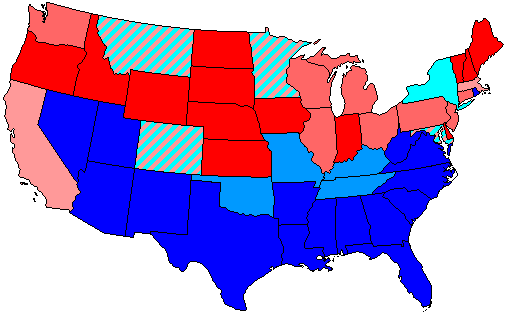
House seats by party holding plurality in state: 80+ to 100% Democratic / 80+ to 100% Republican; 60+ to 80% Democratic / 60+ to 80% Republican; Up to 60% Democratic / Up to 60% Republican

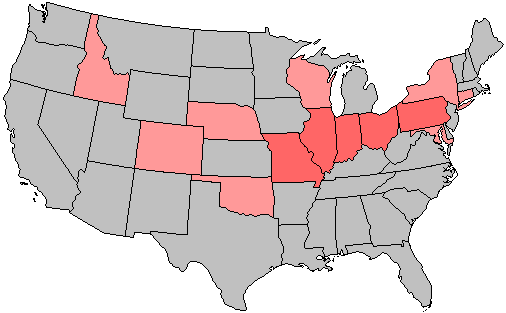
Net change in representation by state: 6+ Democratic gain / 6+ Republican gain; 3-5 Democratic gain / 3-5 Republican gain; 1-2 Democratic gain / 1-2 Republican gain; no net change

== Alabama ==
District	Incumbent	Party	First elected	Result	Candidates
Alabama 1	Frank W. Boykin	Democratic	1935 (special)	Incumbent re-elected.	▌ ✓ Frank W. Boykin (Democratic); Uncontested
Alabama 2	George M. Grant	Democratic	1938	Incumbent re-elected.	▌ ✓ George M. Grant (Democratic); Uncontested
Alabama 3	George W. Andrews	Democratic	1944	Incumbent re-elected.	▌ ✓ George W. Andrews (Democratic); Uncontested
Alabama 4	Sam Hobbs	Democratic	1934	Incumbent retired. Democratic hold.	▌ ✓ Kenneth A. Roberts (Democratic) 93.7%; ▌J. P. Carter (Republican) 6.3%
Alabama 5	Albert Rains	Democratic	1944	Incumbent re-elected.	▌ ✓ Albert Rains (Democratic); Uncontested
Alabama 6	Edward deGraffenried	Democratic	1948	Incumbent re-elected.	▌ ✓ Edward deGraffenried (Democratic); Uncontested
Alabama 7	Carl Elliott	Democratic	1948	Incumbent re-elected.	▌ ✓ Carl Elliott (Democratic); Uncontested
Alabama 8	Robert E. Jones Jr.	Democratic	1947 (special)	Incumbent re-elected.	▌ ✓ Robert E. Jones Jr. (Democratic); Uncontested
Alabama 9	Laurie C. Battle	Democratic	1946	Incumbent re-elected.	▌ ✓ Laurie C. Battle (Democratic); Uncontested

== Arizona ==
District	Incumbent	Party	First elected	Result	Candidates
Arizona 1	John R. Murdock	Democratic	1936	Incumbent re-elected.	▌ ✓ John R. Murdock (Democratic) 60.6%; ▌Carl W. Divelbliss (Republican) 39.4%
Arizona 2	Harold Patten	Democratic	1948	Incumbent re-elected.	▌ ✓ Harold Patten (Democratic) 69.1%; ▌John H. Curnutte (Republican) 30.9%

== Arkansas ==
District	Incumbent	Party	First elected	Result	Candidates
Arkansas 1	Ezekiel C. Gathings	Democratic	1938	Incumbent re-elected.	▌ ✓ Ezekiel C. Gathings (Democratic); Uncontested
Arkansas 2	Wilbur Mills	Democratic	1938	Incumbent re-elected.	▌ ✓ Wilbur Mills (Democratic); Uncontested
Arkansas 3	James William Trimble	Democratic	1944	Incumbent re-elected.	▌ ✓ James William Trimble (Democratic); Uncontested
Arkansas 4	Boyd Anderson Tackett	Democratic	1948	Incumbent re-elected.	▌ ✓ Boyd Anderson Tackett (Democratic); Uncontested
Arkansas 5	Brooks Hays	Democratic	1942	Incumbent re-elected.	▌ ✓ Brooks Hays (Democratic); Uncontested
Arkansas 6	William F. Norrell	Democratic	1938	Incumbent re-elected.	▌ ✓ William F. Norrell (Democratic); Uncontested
Arkansas 7	Oren Harris	Democratic	1940	Incumbent re-elected.	▌ ✓ Oren Harris (Democratic); Uncontested

== California ==
District	Incumbent	Party	First elected	Result	Candidates
California 1	Hubert B. Scudder	Republican	1948	Incumbent re-elected.	▌ ✓ Hubert B. Scudder (Republican) 54.0%; ▌Roger Kent (Democratic) 46.0%
California 2	Clair Engle	Democratic	1943 (special)	Incumbent re-elected.	▌ ✓ Clair Engle (Democratic); Uncontested
California 3	J. Leroy Johnson	Republican	1942	Incumbent re-elected.	▌ ✓ J. Leroy Johnson (Republican); Uncontested
California 4	Franck R. Havenner	Democratic	1944	Incumbent re-elected.	▌ ✓ Franck R. Havenner (Democratic) 67.2%; ▌Raymond D. Smith (Republican) 32.8%
California 5	John F. Shelley	Democratic	1949 (special)	Incumbent re-elected.	▌ ✓ John F. Shelley (Democratic); Uncontested
California 6	George P. Miller	Democratic	1944	Incumbent re-elected.	▌ ✓ George P. Miller (Democratic); Uncontested
California 7	John J. Allen Jr.	Republican	1946	Incumbent re-elected.	▌ ✓ John J. Allen Jr. (Republican) 55.3%; ▌Lyle E. Cook (Democratic) 44.7%
California 8	Jack Z. Anderson	Republican	1938	Incumbent re-elected.	▌ ✓ Jack Z. Anderson (Republican) 83.1%; ▌John A. Peterson (Ind. Progressive) 16.9%
California 9	Cecil F. White	Democratic	1948	Incumbent lost re-election. Republican gain.	▌ ✓ Allan O. Hunter (Republican) 52.0%; ▌Cecil F. White (Democratic) 48.0%
California 10	Thomas H. Werdel	Republican	1948	Incumbent re-elected.	▌ ✓ Thomas H. Werdel (Republican) 53.6%; ▌Ardis M. Walker (Democratic) 46.4%
California 11	Ernest K. Bramblett	Republican	1946	Incumbent re-elected.	▌ ✓ Ernest K. Bramblett (Republican) 52.1%; ▌Marion R. Walker (Democratic) 47.9%
California 12	Richard Nixon	Republican	1946	Incumbent retired to run for U.S. senator. Republican hold.	▌ ✓ Patrick J. Hillings (Republican) 60.1%; ▌Steve Zetterberg (Democratic) 39.9%
California 13	Norris Poulson	Republican	1932; 1946	Incumbent re-elected.	▌ ✓ Norris Poulson (Republican) 84.9%; ▌Ellen P. Davidson (Ind. Progressive) 15.1%
California 14	Helen Gahagan Douglas	Democratic	1944	Incumbent retired to run for U.S. senator. Democratic hold.	▌ ✓ Sam Yorty (Democratic) 49.4%; ▌Jack W. Hardy (Republican) 36.8%; ▌Charlotta Bass (Ind. Progressive) 13.8%
California 15	Gordon L. McDonough	Republican	1944	Incumbent re-elected.	▌ ✓ Gordon L. McDonough (Republican) 87.2%; ▌Jeanne Cole (Ind. Progressive) 12.8%
California 16	Donald L. Jackson	Republican	1946	Incumbent re-elected.	▌ ✓ Donald L. Jackson (Republican) 59.3%; ▌Esther Murray (Democratic) 40.7%
California 17	Cecil R. King	Democratic	1942	Incumbent re-elected.	▌ ✓ Cecil R. King (Democratic); Uncontested
California 18	Clyde Doyle	Democratic	1948	Incumbent re-elected.	▌ ✓ Clyde Doyle (Democratic) 50.5%; ▌Craig Hosmer (Republican) 49.5%
California 19	Chet Holifield	Democratic	1942	Incumbent re-elected.	▌ ✓ Chet Holifield (Democratic) 90.9%; ▌Myra Tanner Weiss (Independent) 9.1%
California 20	John Carl Hinshaw	Republican	1938	Incumbent re-elected.	▌ ✓ John Carl Hinshaw (Republican) 85.1%; ▌William B. Esterman (Ind. Progressive) 10.7%; ▌Frank Nelson (Prohibition) 4.2%
California 21	Harry R. Sheppard	Democratic	1936	Incumbent re-elected.	▌ ✓ Harry R. Sheppard (Democratic) 57.4%; ▌Roy E. Reynolds (Republican) 42.6%
California 22	John Phillips	Republican	1942	Incumbent re-elected.	▌ ✓ John Phillips (Republican); Uncontested
California 23	Clinton D. McKinnon	Democratic	1948	Incumbent re-elected.	▌ ✓ Clinton D. McKinnon (Democratic) 51.0%; ▌Leslie E. Gehres (Republican) 49.0%

== Colorado ==
District	Incumbent	Party	First elected	Result	Candidates
Colorado 1	John A. Carroll	Democratic	1946	Incumbent retired to run for U.S. senator. Democratic hold.	▌ ✓ Byron G. Rogers (Democratic) 50.3%; ▌Richard G. Luxford (Republican) 48.4%; ▌Tillman H. Erb (Independent) 0.9%; ▌Carle Whitehead (Socialist) 0.4%
Colorado 2	William S. Hill	Republican	1940	Incumbent re-elected.	▌ ✓ William S. Hill (Republican) 57.5%; ▌George L. Bickel (Democratic) 42.0%; ▌Hugh M. Fickle (Socialist) 0.5%
Colorado 3	John H. Marsalis	Democratic	1948	Incumbent lost re-election. Republican gain.	▌ ✓ John Chenoweth (Republican) 51.6%; ▌John H. Marsalis (Democratic) 48.4%
Colorado 4	Wayne N. Aspinall	Democratic	1948	Incumbent re-elected.	▌ ✓ Wayne N. Aspinall (Democratic) 57.3%; ▌Jack Evans (Republican) 42.7%

== Connecticut ==
District	Incumbent	Party	First elected	Result	Candidates
Connecticut 1	Abraham Ribicoff	Democratic	1948	Incumbent re-elected.	▌ ✓ Abraham Ribicoff (Democratic) 58.2%; ▌Harry Schwolsky (Republican) 41.8%
Connecticut 2	Chase G. Woodhouse	Democratic	1948	Incumbent lost re-election. Republican gain.	▌ ✓ Horace Seely-Brown Jr. (Republican) 50.8%; ▌Chase G. Woodhouse (Democratic) 49.2%
Connecticut 3	John A. McGuire	Democratic	1948	Incumbent re-elected.	▌ ✓ John A. McGuire (Democratic) 52.1%; ▌Ellsworth Foote (Republican) 47.9%
Connecticut 4	John Davis Lodge	Republican	1946	Incumbent retired to run for Governor of Connecticut. Republican hold.	▌ ✓ Albert P. Morano (Republican) 55.8%; ▌Dennis M. Carroll (Democratic) 44.2%
Connecticut 5	James T. Patterson	Republican	1946	Incumbent re-elected.	▌ ✓ James T. Patterson (Republican) 53.7%; ▌J. Gregory Lynch (Democratic) 46.3%
Connecticut at-large	Antoni Sadlak	Republican	1946	Incumbent re-elected.	▌ ✓ Antoni Sadlak (Republican) 50.4%; ▌Joseph W. Bogdanski (Democratic) 49.6%

== Delaware ==
District	Incumbent	Party	First elected	Result	Candidates
Delaware at-large	J. Caleb Boggs	Republican	1946	Incumbent re-elected.	▌ ✓ J. Caleb Boggs (Republican) 56.7%; ▌Henry M. Winchester (Democratic) 43.3%

== Florida ==
District	Incumbent	Party	First elected	Result	Candidates
Florida 1	J. Hardin Peterson	Democratic	1932	Incumbent retired. Democratic hold.	▌ ✓ Chester B. McMullen (Democratic); Uncontested
Florida 2	Charles E. Bennett	Democratic	1948	Incumbent re-elected.	▌ ✓ Charles E. Bennett (Democratic); Uncontested
Florida 3	Bob Sikes	Democratic	1940; 1944 (resigned); 1974	Incumbent re-elected.	▌ ✓ Bob Sikes (Democratic); Uncontested
Florida 4	George Smathers	Democratic	1946	Incumbent retired to run for U.S. senator. Democratic hold.	▌ ✓ Bill Lantaff (Democratic) 82.1%; ▌Joseph Edward Worton (Republican) 17.9%
Florida 5	Syd Herlong	Democratic	1948	Incumbent re-elected.	▌ ✓ Syd Herlong (Democratic) 76.5%; ▌Carl K. Landes (Republican) 23.5%
Florida 6	Dwight L. Rogers	Democratic	1944	Incumbent re-elected.	▌ ✓ Dwight L. Rogers (Democratic); Uncontested

== Georgia ==
District	Incumbent	Party	First elected	Result	Candidates
Georgia 1	Prince Preston	Democratic	1946	Incumbent re-elected.	▌ ✓ Prince Preston (Democratic); Uncontested
Georgia 2	E. Eugene Cox	Democratic	1924	Incumbent re-elected.	▌ ✓ E. Eugene Cox (Democratic); Uncontested
Georgia 3	Stephen Pace	Democratic	1936	Incumbent retired. Democratic hold.	▌ ✓ Tic Forrester (Democratic); Uncontested
Georgia 4	Albert Sidney Camp	Democratic	1939	Incumbent re-elected.	▌ ✓ Albert Sidney Camp (Democratic); Uncontested
Georgia 5	James C. Davis	Democratic	1946	Incumbent re-elected.	▌ ✓ James C. Davis (Democratic); Uncontested
Georgia 6	Carl Vinson	Democratic	1914	Incumbent re-elected.	▌ ✓ Carl Vinson (Democratic); Uncontested
Georgia 7	Henderson Lovelace Lanham	Democratic	1946	Incumbent re-elected.	▌ ✓ Henderson Lovelace Lanham (Democratic); Uncontested
Georgia 8	William M. Wheeler	Democratic	1946	Incumbent re-elected.	▌ ✓ William M. Wheeler (Democratic); Uncontested
Georgia 9	John Stephens Wood	Democratic	1944	Incumbent re-elected.	▌ ✓ John Stephens Wood (Democratic); Uncontested
Georgia 10	Paul Brown	Democratic	1933	Incumbent re-elected.	▌ ✓ Paul Brown (Democratic); Uncontested

== Idaho ==
District	Incumbent	Party	First elected	Result	Candidates
Idaho 1	Compton I. White	Democratic	1948	Incumbent retired to run for U.S. senator. Republican gain.	▌ ✓ John Travers Wood (Republican) 50.5%; ▌Gracie Pfost (Democratic) 49.5%
Idaho 2	John C. Sanborn	Republican	1946	Incumbent retired to run for U.S. senator. Republican hold.	▌ ✓ Hamer H. Budge (Republican) 57.1%; ▌James H. Hawley Jr. (Democratic) 42.9%

== Illinois ==
District	Incumbent	Party	First elected	Result	Candidates
Illinois 1	William L. Dawson	Democratic	1942	Incumbent re-elected.	▌ ✓ William L. Dawson (Democratic) 61.7%; ▌Archibald James Carey Jr. (Republican) 37.3%; ▌Samuel J. Parks (Progressive) 1.0%
Illinois 2	Barratt O'Hara	Democratic	1948	Incumbent lost re-election. Republican gain.	▌ ✓ Richard B. Vail (Republican) 53.6%; ▌Barratt O'Hara (Democratic) 46.4%
Illinois 3	Neil J. Linehan	Democratic	1948	Incumbent lost re-election. Republican gain.	▌ ✓ Fred E. Busbey (Republican) 57.2%; ▌Neil J. Linehan (Democratic) 42.8%
Illinois 4	James V. Buckley	Democratic	1948	Incumbent lost re-election. Republican gain.	▌ ✓ William E. McVey (Republican) 55.8%; ▌James V. Buckley (Democratic) 44.2%
Illinois 5	Martin Gorski	Democratic	1942	Incumbent died. Democratic hold.	▌ ✓ John C. Kluczynski (Democratic) 65.6%; ▌Edward M. Gaynor (Republican) 34.4%
Illinois 6	Thomas J. O'Brien	Democratic	1942	Incumbent re-elected.	▌ ✓ Thomas J. O'Brien (Democratic) 64.6%; ▌John M. Fay (Republican) 35.4%
Illinois 7	Adolph J. Sabath	Democratic	1906	Incumbent re-elected.	▌ ✓ Adolph J. Sabath (Democratic) 71.8%; ▌Henry E. Hayes (Republican) 28.2%
Illinois 8	Thomas S. Gordon	Democratic	1942	Incumbent re-elected.	▌ ✓ Thomas S. Gordon (Democratic) 59.3%; ▌Philip Grontkowski (Republican) 40.7%
Illinois 9	Sidney R. Yates	Democratic	1948	Incumbent re-elected.	▌ ✓ Sidney R. Yates (Democratic) 51.8%; ▌Maxwell A. Goodwin (Republican) 48.2%
Illinois 10	Richard W. Hoffman	Republican	1948	Incumbent re-elected.	▌ ✓ Richard W. Hoffman (Republican) 66.5%; ▌Charles J. Michal (Democratic) 33.5%
Illinois 11	Chester A. Chesney	Democratic	1948	Incumbent lost re-election. Republican gain.	▌ ✓ Timothy P. Sheehan (Republican) 56.7%; ▌Chester A. Chesney (Democratic) 43.3%
Illinois 12	Edgar A. Jonas	Republican	1948	Incumbent re-elected.	▌ ✓ Edgar A. Jonas (Republican) 56.2%; ▌Charles J. Komaiko (Democratic) 43.8%
Illinois 13	Ralph E. Church	Republican	1942	Incumbent died. Republican hold.	▌ ✓ Marguerite S. Church (Republican) 74.1%; ▌Thomas F. Dolan (Democratic) 25.9%
Illinois 14	Chauncey W. Reed	Republican	1934	Incumbent re-elected.	▌ ✓ Chauncey W. Reed (Republican) 74.2%; ▌Homer R. McElroy (Democratic) 25.8%
Illinois 15	Noah M. Mason	Republican	1936	Incumbent re-elected.	▌ ✓ Noah M. Mason (Republican) 63.3%; ▌Wayne F. Caskey (Democratic) 36.7%
Illinois 16	Leo E. Allen	Republican	1932	Incumbent re-elected.	▌ ✓ Leo E. Allen (Republican) 67.3%; ▌Russell J. Goldman (Democratic) 32.7%
Illinois 17	Leslie C. Arends	Republican	1934	Incumbent re-elected.	▌ ✓ Leslie C. Arends (Republican) 66.8%; ▌Joe W. Russell (Democratic) 33.2%
Illinois 18	Harold H. Velde	Republican	1948	Incumbent re-elected.	▌ ✓ Harold H. Velde (Republican) 61.6%; ▌Walter Durley Boyle (Democratic) 38.4%
Illinois 19	Robert B. Chiperfield	Republican	1938	Incumbent re-elected.	▌ ✓ Robert B. Chiperfield (Republican) 59.0%; ▌John Michael Kerwin Jr. (Democratic) 41.0%
Illinois 20	Sid Simpson	Republican	1942	Incumbent re-elected.	▌ ✓ Sid Simpson (Republican) 59.3%; ▌Howard Manning (Democratic) 40.7%
Illinois 21	Peter F. Mack Jr.	Democratic	1948	Incumbent re-elected.	▌ ✓ Peter F. Mack Jr. (Democratic) 52.8%; ▌Benjamin S. DeBoice (Republican) 47.2%
Illinois 22	Rolla C. McMillen	Republican	1944	Incumbent retired. Republican hold.	▌ ✓ William L. Springer (Republican) 60.7%; ▌Robert B. Borchers (Democratic) 39.3%
Illinois 23	Edward H. Jenison	Republican	1946	Incumbent re-elected.	▌ ✓ Edward H. Jenison (Republican) 55.9%; ▌Laurence F. Arnold (Democratic) 44.1%
Illinois 24	Charles W. Vursell	Republican	1942	Incumbent re-elected.	▌ ✓ Charles W. Vursell (Republican) 55.3%; ▌John David Upchurch (Democratic) 44.7%
Illinois 25	Melvin Price	Democratic	1944	Incumbent re-elected.	▌ ✓ Melvin Price (Democratic) 64.9%; ▌Roger D. Jones (Republican) 35.1%
Illinois 26	C. W. Bishop	Republican	1940	Incumbent re-elected.	▌ ✓ C. W. Bishop (Republican) 51.2%; ▌Kent E. Keller (Democratic) 48.8%

== Indiana ==
District	Incumbent	Party	First elected	Result	Candidates
Indiana 1	Ray Madden	Democratic	1942	Incumbent re-elected.	▌ ✓ Ray Madden (Democratic) 52.6%; ▌Paul Cyr (Republican) 47.0%; ▌Harry Beamer (Prohibition) 0.4%
Indiana 2	Charles A. Halleck	Republican	1935	Incumbent re-elected.	▌ ✓ Charles A. Halleck (Republican) 57.2%; ▌Dale E. Beck (Democratic) 42.2%; ▌Lee R. Cory (Prohibition) 0.6%
Indiana 3	Thurman C. Crook	Democratic	1948	Incumbent lost re-election. Republican gain.	▌ ✓ Shepard Crumpacker (Republican) 52.8%; ▌Thurman C. Crook (Democratic) 46.4%; ▌Everett Mishler (Prohibition) 0.7%
Indiana 4	Edward H. Kruse	Democratic	1948	Incumbent lost re-election. Republican gain.	▌ ✓ E. Ross Adair (Republican) 56.2%; ▌Edward H. Kruse (Democratic) 43.1%; ▌Lewis Black (Prohibition) 0.7%
Indiana 5	John R. Walsh	Democratic	1948	Incumbent lost re-election. Republican gain.	▌ ✓ John V. Beamer (Republican) 54.1%; ▌John R. Walsh (Democratic) 45.3%; ▌Ralph G. Stallsmith (Prohibition) 0.6%
Indiana 6	Cecil M. Harden	Republican	1948	Incumbent re-elected.	▌ ✓ Cecil M. Harden (Republican) 52.4%; ▌Jack H. Mankin (Democratic) 47.2%; ▌Ernie Beck (Prohibition) 0.4%
Indiana 7	James E. Noland	Democratic	1948	Incumbent lost re-election. Republican gain.	▌ ✓ William G. Bray (Republican) 50.0%; ▌James E. Noland (Democratic) 49.3%; ▌Graydon E. Terbush (Prohibition) 0.7%
Indiana 8	Winfield K. Denton	Democratic	1948	Incumbent re-elected.	▌ ✓ Winfield K. Denton (Democratic) 51.0%; ▌Herman L. McCray (Republican) 48.3%; ▌Raymond Morris (Prohibition) 0.6%
Indiana 9	Earl Wilson	Republican	1940	Incumbent re-elected.	▌ ✓ Earl Wilson (Republican) 54.9%; ▌Charles W. Long (Democratic) 44.6%; ▌Elmer D. Riggs (Prohibition) 0.4%
Indiana 10	Ralph Harvey	Republican	1947	Incumbent re-elected.	▌ ✓ Ralph Harvey (Republican) 58.7%; ▌Vernon J. Dwyer (Democratic) 40.5%; ▌Carl W. Thompson (Prohibition) 0.9%
Indiana 11	Andrew Jacobs Sr.	Democratic	1948	Incumbent lost re-election. Republican gain.	▌ ✓ Charles B. Brownson (Republican) 56.5%; ▌Andrew Jacobs Sr. (Democratic) 43.0%; ▌Alston E. Wrentmore (Prohibition) 0.5%

== Iowa ==
District	Incumbent	Party	First elected	Result	Candidates
Iowa 1	Thomas E. Martin	Republican	1938	Incumbent re-elected.	▌ ✓ Thomas E. Martin (Republican) 61.7%; ▌James D. France (Democratic) 38.0%; ▌F. A. Oliver (Prohibition) 0.3%
Iowa 2	Henry O. Talle	Republican	1938	Incumbent re-elected.	▌ ✓ Henry O. Talle (Republican) 58.8%; ▌Eugene J. Kean (Democratic) 41.2%
Iowa 3	H. R. Gross	Republican	1948	Incumbent re-elected.	▌ ✓ H. R. Gross (Republican) 64.0%; ▌James O. Babcock (Democratic) 35.5%; Others: ▌Paul Kindschi (Prohibition) 0.3%; ▌[FNU] Baker (State Rights) 0.1%
Iowa 4	Karl M. LeCompte	Republican	1938	Incumbent re-elected.	▌ ✓ Karl M. LeCompte (Republican) 56.7%; ▌Steven V. Carter (Democratic) 42.8%; ▌Benson B. Compton (Prohibition) 0.5%
Iowa 5	Paul Cunningham	Republican	1940	Incumbent re-elected.	▌ ✓ Paul Cunningham (Republican) 56.9%; ▌Gibson C. Holliday (Democratic) 42.7%; ▌Richard DeCamp (Prohibition) 0.3%
Iowa 6	James I. Dolliver	Republican	1944	Incumbent re-elected.	▌ ✓ James I. Dolliver (Republican) 64.6%; ▌Maurice O'Reilly (Democratic) 35.0%; ▌[FNU] Nelson (Prohibition) 0.4%
Iowa 7	Ben F. Jensen	Republican	1938	Incumbent re-elected.	▌ ✓ Ben F. Jensen (Republican) 62.0%; ▌James A. Hart (Democratic) 37.7%; ▌[FNU] Young (Prohibition) 0.2%
Iowa 8	Charles B. Hoeven	Republican	1942	Incumbent re-elected.	▌ ✓ Charles B. Hoeven (Republican) 64.1%; ▌L. J. McGivern (Democratic) 35.7%; ▌Roy V. Bishop (Prohibition) 0.2%

== Kansas ==
District	Incumbent	Party	First elected	Result	Candidates
Kansas 1	Albert M. Cole	Republican	1944	Incumbent re-elected.	▌ ✓ Albert M. Cole (Republican) 66.5%; ▌Ewell Stewart (Democratic) 33.5%
Kansas 2	Errett P. Scrivner	Republican	1943	Incumbent re-elected.	▌ ✓ Errett P. Scrivner (Republican) 52.2%; ▌Milton Sullivant (Democratic) 47.8%
Kansas 3	Herbert A. Meyer	Republican	1946	Incumbent died October 2, 1950. Republican hold.	▌ ✓ Myron V. George (Republican) 54.7%; ▌Barnes Griffith (Democratic) 45.3%
Kansas 4	Edward Herbert Rees	Republican	1936	Incumbent re-elected.	▌ ✓ Edward Herbert Rees (Republican) 58.9%; ▌Louis A. Donnell (Democratic) 41.1%
Kansas 5	Clifford R. Hope	Republican	1926	Incumbent re-elected.	▌ ✓ Clifford R. Hope (Republican) 61.8%; ▌Robert L. Bock (Democratic) 38.2%
Kansas 6	Wint Smith	Republican	1946	Incumbent re-elected.	▌ ✓ Wint Smith (Republican) 59.5%; ▌F. F. Wasinger (Democratic) 40.5%

== Kentucky ==
District	Incumbent	Party	First elected	Result	Candidates
Kentucky 1	Noble Jones Gregory	Democratic	1936	Incumbent re-elected.	▌ ✓ Noble Jones Gregory (Democratic); Uncontested
Kentucky 2	John A. Whitaker	Democratic	1948	Incumbent re-elected.	▌ ✓ John A. Whitaker (Democratic); Uncontested
Kentucky 3	Thruston Ballard Morton	Republican	1946	Incumbent re-elected.	▌ ✓ Thruston Ballard Morton (Republican) 55.5%; ▌Alex P. Humphrey (Democratic) 44.5%
Kentucky 4	Frank Chelf	Democratic	1944	Incumbent re-elected.	▌ ✓ Frank Chelf (Democratic); Uncontested
Kentucky 5	Brent Spence	Democratic	1930	Incumbent re-elected.	▌ ✓ Brent Spence (Democratic) 63.3%; ▌Thomas W. Hardesty (Republican) 36.7%
Kentucky 6	Thomas R. Underwood	Democratic	1948	Incumbent re-elected.	▌ ✓ Thomas R. Underwood (Democratic); Uncontested
Kentucky 7	Carl D. Perkins	Democratic	1948	Incumbent re-elected.	▌ ✓ Carl D. Perkins (Democratic) 56.1%; ▌O. W. Thompson (Republican) 43.9%
Kentucky 8	Joe B. Bates	Democratic	1930	Incumbent re-elected.	▌ ✓ Joe B. Bates (Democratic) 60.5%; ▌Elmer C. Roberts (Republican) 39.5%
Kentucky 9	James S. Golden	Republican	1948	Incumbent re-elected.	▌ ✓ James S. Golden (Republican); Uncontested

== Louisiana ==
District	Incumbent	Party	First elected	Result	Candidates
Louisiana 1	F. Edward Hébert	Democratic	1940	Incumbent re-elected.	▌ ✓ F. Edward Hébert (Democratic); Uncontested
Louisiana 2	Hale Boggs	Democratic	1940; 1942 (lost); 1946	Incumbent re-elected.	▌ ✓ Hale Boggs (Democratic); Uncontested
Louisiana 3	Edwin E. Willis	Democratic	1948	Incumbent re-elected.	▌ ✓ Edwin E. Willis (Democratic); Uncontested
Louisiana 4	Overton Brooks	Democratic	1936	Incumbent re-elected.	▌ ✓ Overton Brooks (Democratic); Uncontested
Louisiana 5	Otto Passman	Democratic	1946	Incumbent re-elected.	▌ ✓ Otto Passman (Democratic); Uncontested
Louisiana 6	James H. Morrison	Democratic	1942	Incumbent re-elected.	▌ ✓ James H. Morrison (Democratic); Uncontested
Louisiana 7	Henry D. Larcade Jr.	Democratic	1942	Incumbent re-elected.	▌ ✓ Henry D. Larcade Jr. (Democratic); Uncontested
Louisiana 8	A. Leonard Allen	Democratic	1936	Incumbent re-elected.	▌ ✓ A. Leonard Allen (Democratic); Uncontested

== Maine ==
District	Incumbent	Party	First elected	Result	Candidates
Maine 1	Robert Hale	Republican	1942	Incumbent re-elected.	▌ ✓ Robert Hale (Republican) 54.0%; ▌Lucia M. Cormier (Democratic) 46.0%
Maine 2	Charles P. Nelson	Republican	1948	Incumbent re-elected.	▌ ✓ Charles P. Nelson (Republican) 57.7%; ▌John J. Malone Jr. (Democratic) 42.3%
Maine 3	Frank Fellows	Republican	1940	Incumbent re-elected.	▌ ✓ Frank Fellows (Republican) 62.9%; ▌John V. Keenan (Democratic) 37.1%

== Maryland ==
District	Incumbent	Party	First elected	Result	Candidates
Maryland 1	Edward T. Miller	Republican	1946	Incumbent re-elected.	▌ ✓ Edward T. Miller (Republican) 57.0%; ▌Thomas F. Johnson (Democratic) 43.0%
Maryland 2	William P. Bolton	Democratic	1948	Incumbent lost re-election. Republican gain.	▌ ✓ James Devereux (Republican) 50.2%; ▌William P. Bolton (Democratic) 48.7%; ▌Thelma Gerende (Progressive) 1.1%
Maryland 3	Edward Garmatz	Democratic	1947	Incumbent re-elected.	▌ ✓ Edward Garmatz (Democratic) 65.7%; ▌Louis R. Milio (Republican) 34.3%
Maryland 4	George Hyde Fallon	Democratic	1944	Incumbent re-elected.	▌ ✓ George Hyde Fallon (Democratic) 56.8%; ▌James W. Miller (Republican) 41.3%; ▌Marshall Jones (Progressive) 1.8%
Maryland 5	Lansdale Sasscer	Democratic	1939	Incumbent re-elected.	▌ ✓ Lansdale Sasscer (Democratic) 57.5%; ▌Thomas S. Carr (Republican) 42.5%
Maryland 6	J. Glenn Beall	Republican	1942	Incumbent re-elected.	▌ ✓ J. Glenn Beall (Republican) 61.9%; ▌Russell P. Hartle (Democratic) 38.1%

== Massachusetts ==
District	Incumbent	Party	First elected	Result	Candidates
Massachusetts 1	John W. Heselton	Republican	1944	Incumbent re-elected.	▌ ✓ John W. Heselton (Republican) 68.9%; ▌Anna Sullivan (Democratic) 31.1%
Massachusetts 2	Foster Furcolo	Democratic	1948	Incumbent re-elected.	▌ ✓ Foster Furcolo (Democratic) 54.6%; ▌Chester T. Skibinski (Republican) 45.4%
Massachusetts 3	Philip J. Philbin	Democratic	1942	Incumbent re-elected.	▌ ✓ Philip J. Philbin (Democratic) 71.5%; ▌John F. Fuller (Republican) 28.5%
Massachusetts 4	Harold Donohue	Democratic	1946	Incumbent re-elected.	▌ ✓ Harold Donohue (Democratic) 56.9%; ▌John Winslow (Republican) 42.6%; ▌Victoria M. Beckett (Prohibition) 0.5%
Massachusetts 5	Edith Nourse Rogers	Republican	1925	Incumbent re-elected.	▌ ✓ Edith Nourse Rogers (Republican) 76.1%; ▌Clement Gregory McDonough (Democratic) 23.9%
Massachusetts 6	William H. Bates	Republican	1950	Incumbent re-elected.	▌ ✓ William H. Bates (Republican) 73.7%; ▌Richard M. Russell (Democratic) 26.3%
Massachusetts 7	Thomas J. Lane	Democratic	1941	Incumbent re-elected.	▌ ✓ Thomas J. Lane (Democratic) 78.5%; ▌Laurence A. Doyle (Republican) 20.8%; ▌E. Frank Searle (Prohibition) 0.8%
Massachusetts 8	Angier Goodwin	Republican	1942	Incumbent re-elected.	▌ ✓ Angier Goodwin (Republican) 53.9%; ▌John B. Carr (Democratic) 46.1%
Massachusetts 9	Donald W. Nicholson	Republican	1947	Incumbent re-elected.	▌ ✓ Donald W. Nicholson (Republican) 58.1%; ▌August J. Cormier (Democratic) 41.3%; ▌Grace Farnsworth Luder (Prohibition) 0.6%
Massachusetts 10	Christian Herter	Republican	1942	Incumbent re-elected.	▌ ✓ Christian Herter (Republican) 57.8%; ▌Francis X. Hurley (Democratic) 41.5%; ▌Katherine L. S. Goddard (Prohibition) 0.7%
Massachusetts 11	John F. Kennedy	Democratic	1946	Incumbent re-elected.	▌ ✓ John F. Kennedy (Democratic) 82.3%; ▌Vincent J. Celeste (Republican) 17.2%; ▌Martha E. Geer (Prohibition) 0.5%
Massachusetts 12	John W. McCormack	Democratic	1928	Incumbent re-elected.	▌ ✓ John W. McCormack (Democratic) 84.0%; ▌John J. Biggins (Republican) 13.7%; ▌Florence Luscomb (Progressive) 1.8%; ▌Anna B. Campbell (Prohibition) 0.5%
Massachusetts 13	Richard B. Wigglesworth	Republican	1928	Incumbent re-elected.	▌ ✓ Richard B. Wigglesworth (Republican) 62.2%; ▌David J. Concannon (Democratic) 37.3%; ▌William R. Ferry (Prohibition) 0.5%
Massachusetts 14	Joseph W. Martin Jr.	Republican	1924	Incumbent re-elected.	▌ ✓ Joseph W. Martin Jr. (Republican) 64.3%; ▌Edward P. Grace (Democratic) 35.3%; ▌Paul D. Campbell (Prohibition) 0.4%

== Michigan ==
District	Incumbent	Party	First elected	Result	Candidates
Michigan 1	George G. Sadowski	Democratic	1942	Incumbent lost renomination. Democratic hold.	▌ ✓ Thaddeus M. Machrowicz (Democratic) 82.2%; ▌Rudolph G. Tenerowicz (Republican) 15.9%; Others: ▌Dorothy Knight (Progressive) 1.6%; ▌Norman Frazier (Prohibition) 0.3%
Michigan 2	Earl C. Michener	Republican	1934	Incumbent retired. Republican hold.	▌ ✓ George Meader (Republican) 60.4%; ▌John P. Dawson (Democratic) 39.0%; ▌Walter S. Haynes (Prohibition) 0.5%
Michigan 3	Paul W. Shafer	Republican	1936	Incumbent re-elected.	▌ ✓ Paul W. Shafer (Republican) 61.4%; ▌Thomas B. Woodworth (Democratic) 37.6%; ▌Lawrence A. Ruble (Prohibition) 1.0%
Michigan 4	Clare Hoffman	Republican	1934	Incumbent re-elected.	▌ ✓ Clare Hoffman (Republican) 68.6%; ▌Forest A. Schoonard (Democratic) 30.8%; ▌Ralph C. March (Prohibition) 0.7%
Michigan 5	Gerald Ford	Republican	1948	Incumbent re-elected.	▌ ✓ Gerald Ford (Republican) 66.7%; ▌James H. McLaughlin (Democratic) 32.9%; ▌Ella Fruin (Prohibition) 0.3%
Michigan 6	William W. Blackney	Republican	1938	Incumbent re-elected.	▌ ✓ William W. Blackney (Republican) 52.8%; ▌Herbert W. Devine (Democratic) 46.3%; Others: ▌Howard E. Winters (Prohibition) 0.5%; ▌Shirley O. Foster (Progressive) 0.3%; ▌Genora Dollinger (Socialist Workers) 0.04%
Michigan 7	Jesse P. Wolcott	Republican	1930	Incumbent re-elected.	▌ ✓ Jesse P. Wolcott (Republican) 63.0%; ▌Roy E. Visnaw (Democratic) 36.6%; ▌Clarence Dykehouse (Prohibition) 0.4%
Michigan 8	Fred L. Crawford	Republican	1934	Incumbent re-elected.	▌ ✓ Fred L. Crawford (Republican) 60.5%; ▌Leland S. Jennings (Democratic) 38.7%; ▌D. Ruth Larson (Prohibition) 0.8%
Michigan 9	Albert J. Engel	Republican	1934	Incumbent retired to run for Governor of Michigan. Republican hold.	▌ ✓ Ruth Thompson (Republican) 54.5%; ▌Noel P. Fox (Democratic) 45.0%; ▌Seth A. Davey (Prohibition) 0.5%
Michigan 10	Roy O. Woodruff	Republican	1920	Incumbent re-elected.	▌ ✓ Roy O. Woodruff (Republican) 66.2%; ▌William J. Kelly (Democratic) 33.8%
Michigan 11	Charles E. Potter	Republican	1947	Incumbent re-elected.	▌ ✓ Charles E. Potter (Republican) 66.5%; ▌Fred L. Hanscom (Democratic) 33.2%; ▌Benjamin G. Roberts (Prohibition) 0.3%
Michigan 12	John B. Bennett	Republican	1946	Incumbent re-elected.	▌ ✓ John B. Bennett (Republican) 61.7%; ▌John Sabol (Democratic) 38.3%
Michigan 13	George D. O'Brien	Democratic	1948	Incumbent re-elected.	▌ ✓ George D. O'Brien (Democratic) 61.4%; ▌Clarence J. McLeod (Republican) 38.3%; ▌Karl V. Kurtz (Prohibition) 0.2%
Michigan 14	Louis C. Rabaut	Democratic	1948	Incumbent re-elected.	▌ ✓ Louis C. Rabaut (Democratic) 51.5%; ▌Richard Durant (Republican) 48.3%; ▌Herman G. Ottmer (Prohibition) 0.2%
Michigan 15	John Dingell Sr.	Democratic	1932	Incumbent re-elected.	▌ ✓ John Dingell Sr. (Democratic) 64.1%; ▌Robert L. Berry (Republican) 35.7%; ▌Harold Drake (Prohibition) 0.2%
Michigan 16	John Lesinski Sr.	Democratic	1932	Incumbent died. Democratic hold.	▌ ✓ John Lesinski Jr. (Democratic) 60.7%; ▌Kirby L. Wilson Jr. (Republican) 38.5%; Others: ▌O. Don Christie (Progressive) 0.5%; ▌Earl A. Johnson (Prohibition) 0.3%
Michigan 17	George A. Dondero	Republican	1932	Incumbent re-elected.	▌ ✓ George A. Dondero (Republican) 55.6%; ▌Eugene G. Donohoe (Democratic) 44.1%; ▌A. J. Nellis (Prohibition) 0.3%

== Minnesota ==
District	Incumbent	Party	First elected	Result	Candidates
Minnesota 1	August H. Andresen	Republican	1934	Incumbent re-elected.	▌ ✓ August H. Andresen (Republican) 67.1%; ▌Burton Chambers (DFL) 32.9%
Minnesota 2	Joseph P. O'Hara	Republican	1940	Incumbent re-elected.	▌ ✓ Joseph P. O'Hara (Republican) 59.9%; ▌Harry Sieben Sr. (DFL) 40.1%
Minnesota 3	Roy Wier	Democratic (DFL)	1948	Incumbent re-elected.	▌ ✓ Roy Wier (DFL) 51.7%; ▌Alfred D. Lindley (Republican) 48.3%
Minnesota 4	Eugene McCarthy	Democratic (DFL)	1948	Incumbent re-elected.	▌ ✓ Eugene McCarthy (DFL) 60.4%; ▌Ward Fleming (Republican) 39.6%
Minnesota 5	Walter Judd	Republican	1942	Incumbent re-elected.	▌ ✓ Walter Judd (Republican) 58.7%; ▌Marcella F. Killen (DFL) 40.2%; ▌Grace Carlson (Socialist Workers) 1.1%
Minnesota 6	Fred Marshall	Democratic (DFL)	1948	Incumbent re-elected.	▌ ✓ Fred Marshall (DFL) 56.2%; ▌Robert F. Lee (Republican) 43.8%
Minnesota 7	H. Carl Andersen	Republican	1938	Incumbent re-elected.	▌ ✓ H. Carl Andersen (Republican) 61.7%; ▌Carl J. Eastvold (DFL) 38.3%
Minnesota 8	John Blatnik	Democratic (DFL)	1946	Incumbent re-elected.	▌ ✓ John Blatnik (DFL) 62.9%; ▌William A. Pittenger (Republican) 37.1%
Minnesota 9	Harold Hagen	Republican	1944	Incumbent re-elected.	▌ ✓ Harold Hagen (Republican) 61.9%; ▌Curtiss Olson (DFL) 33.5%; ▌August J. Duren (Independent) 4.6%

== Mississippi ==
District	Incumbent	Party	First elected	Result	Candidates
Mississippi 1	John E. Rankin	Democratic	1920	Incumbent re-elected.	▌ ✓ John E. Rankin (Democratic) 92.5%; ▌Glenn Hayes (Republican) 7.5%
Mississippi 2	Jamie Whitten	Democratic	1941	Incumbent re-elected.	▌ ✓ Jamie Whitten (Democratic); Uncontested
Mississippi 3	William Madison Whittington	Democratic	1924	Incumbent retired. Democratic hold.	▌ ✓ Frank Ellis Smith (Democratic) 92.5%; ▌Nelson E. Taylor (Republican) 7.5%
Mississippi 4	Thomas Abernethy	Democratic	1942	Incumbent re-elected.	▌ ✓ Thomas Abernethy (Democratic) 95.8%; ▌G. O. Deaton (Republican) 4.2%
Mississippi 5	W. Arthur Winstead	Democratic	1942	Incumbent re-elected.	▌ ✓ W. Arthur Winstead (Democratic) 97.6%; ▌J. Clay Erwin (Republican) 2.4%
Mississippi 6	William M. Colmer	Democratic	1932	Incumbent re-elected.	▌ ✓ William M. Colmer (Democratic) 87.9%; ▌Frank H. Harper (Independent) 12.1%
Mississippi 7	John Bell Williams	Democratic	1946	Incumbent re-elected.	▌ ✓ John Bell Williams (Democratic) 96.4%; ▌James A. White (Republican) 3.6%

== Missouri ==
District	Incumbent	Party	First elected	Result	Candidates
Missouri 1	Clare Magee	Democratic	1948	Incumbent re-elected.	▌ ✓ Clare Magee (Democratic) 54.4%; ▌Samuel W. Arnold (Republican) 45.6%
Missouri 2	Morgan M. Moulder	Democratic	1948	Incumbent re-elected.	▌ ✓ Morgan M. Moulder (Democratic) 53.0%; ▌Max Schwabe (Republican) 47.0%
Missouri 3	Phil J. Welch	Democratic	1948	Incumbent re-elected.	▌ ✓ Phil J. Welch (Democratic) 51.1%; ▌William C. Cole (Republican) 48.9%
Missouri 4	Leonard Irving	Democratic	1948	Incumbent re-elected.	▌ ✓ Leonard Irving (Democratic) 61.6%; ▌Vernon D. Fulcrut (Republican) 38.4%
Missouri 5	Richard Walker Bolling	Democratic	1948	Incumbent re-elected.	▌ ✓ Richard Walker Bolling (Democratic) 54.5%; ▌Richard C. Jensen (Republican) 45.5%
Missouri 6	George H. Christopher	Democratic	1948	Incumbent lost re-election. Republican gain.	▌ ✓ Orland K. Armstrong (Republican) 50.7%; ▌George H. Christopher (Democratic) 49.3%
Missouri 7	Dewey Jackson Short	Republican	1934	Incumbent re-elected.	▌ ✓ Dewey Jackson Short (Republican) 58.7%; ▌Daniel J. Leary (Democratic) 41.3%
Missouri 8	A. S. J. Carnahan	Democratic	1948	Incumbent re-elected.	▌ ✓ A. S. J. Carnahan (Democratic) 54.6%; ▌Parke M. Banta (Republican) 45.4%
Missouri 9	Clarence Cannon	Democratic	1922	Incumbent re-elected.	▌ ✓ Clarence Cannon (Democratic) 61.4%; ▌John H. Fahien (Republican) 38.6%
Missouri 10	Paul C. Jones	Democratic	1948	Incumbent re-elected.	▌ ✓ Paul C. Jones (Democratic); Uncontested
Missouri 11	John B. Sullivan	Democratic	1948	Incumbent re-elected.	▌ ✓ John B. Sullivan (Democratic) 64.5%; ▌Sidney R. Redmond (Republican) 35.1%; ▌Don Lohbeck (Christian Nationalist) 0.3%
Missouri 12	Raymond W. Karst	Democratic	1948	Incumbent lost re-election. Republican gain.	▌ ✓ Thomas B. Curtis (Republican) 50.9%; ▌Raymond W. Karst (Democratic) 49.0%; ▌Joseph Intaliata (Christian Nationalist) 0.1%
Missouri 13	Frank M. Karsten	Democratic	1946	Incumbent re-elected.	▌ ✓ Frank M. Karsten (Democratic) 68.2%; ▌Hal A. Hamilton (Republican) 31.7%; ▌Edward Abshier (Christian Nationalist) 0.1%

== Montana ==
District	Incumbent	Party	First elected	Result	Candidates
Montana 1	Mike Mansfield	Democratic	1942	Incumbent re-elected.	▌ ✓ Mike Mansfield (Democratic) 60.2%; ▌Ralph Y. McGinnis (Republican) 38.7%; ▌Leverne Hamilton (Socialist) 1.0%
Montana 2	Wesley A. D'Ewart	Republican	1945 (special)	Incumbent re-elected.	▌ ✓ Wesley A. D'Ewart (Republican) 54.1%; ▌John J. Holmes (Democratic) 44.8%; ▌Chester L. Kinsey (Progressive) 1.2%

== Nebraska ==
District	Incumbent	Party	First elected	Result	Candidates
Nebraska 1	Carl Curtis	Republican	1938	Incumbent re-elected.	▌ ✓ Carl Curtis (Republican) 54.5%; ▌Clarence G. Miles (Democratic) 45.5%
Nebraska 2	Eugene D. O'Sullivan	Democratic	1948	Incumbent lost re-election. Republican gain.	▌ ✓ Howard Buffett (Republican) 63.5%; ▌Eugene D. O'Sullivan (Democratic) 36.5%
Nebraska 3	Karl Stefan	Republican	1934	Incumbent re-elected.	▌ ✓ Karl Stefan (Republican) 66.9%; ▌Duane K. Peterson (Democratic) 33.1%
Nebraska 4	Arthur L. Miller	Republican	1942	Incumbent re-elected.	▌ ✓ Arthur L. Miller (Republican) 65.8%; ▌Hans J. Holtorf Jr. (Democratic) 34.2%

== Nevada ==
District	Incumbent	Party	First elected	Result	Candidates
Nevada at-large	Walter S. Baring Jr.	Democratic	1948	Incumbent re-elected.	▌ ✓ Walter S. Baring Jr. (Democratic) 52.8%; ▌A. E. MacKenzie (Republican) 47.2%

== New Hampshire ==
District	Incumbent	Party	First elected	Result	Candidates
New Hampshire 1	Chester Earl Merrow	Republican	1942	Incumbent re-elected.	▌ ✓ Chester Earl Merrow (Republican) 57.5%; ▌Frank L. Sullivan (Democratic) 42.5%
New Hampshire 2	Norris Cotton	Republican	1946	Incumbent re-elected.	▌ ✓ Norris Cotton (Republican) 64.5%; ▌George Brummer (Democratic) 35.5%

== New Jersey ==
District	Incumbent	Party	First elected	Result	Candidates
New Jersey 1	Charles A. Wolverton	Republican	1926	Incumbent re-elected.	▌ ✓ Charles A. Wolverton (Republican) 56.7%; ▌John J. Crean (Democratic) 43.3%
New Jersey 2	T. Millet Hand	Republican	1944	Incumbent re-elected.	▌ ✓ T. Millet Hand (Republican) 54.3%; ▌Elmer H. Wene (Democratic) 45.7%
New Jersey 3	James C. Auchincloss	Republican	1942	Incumbent re-elected.	▌ ✓ James C. Auchincloss (Republican) 62.4%; ▌John C. Applegate (Democratic) 37.0%; ▌Frances Leber (Progressive) 0.6%
New Jersey 4	Charles R. Howell	Democratic	1948	Incumbent re-elected.	▌ ✓ Charles R. Howell (Democratic) 52.2%; ▌Gill Robb Wilson (Republican) 47.8%
New Jersey 5	Charles A. Eaton	Republican	1924	Incumbent re-elected.	▌ ✓ Charles A. Eaton (Republican) 61.6%; ▌Thomas Chabrak (Democratic) 38.4%
New Jersey 6	Clifford P. Case	Republican	1944	Incumbent re-elected.	▌ ✓ Clifford P. Case (Republican) 62.2%; ▌Harry Mopsick (Democratic) 37.8%
New Jersey 7	William B. Widnall	Republican	1950	Incumbent re-elected.	▌ ✓ William B. Widnall (Republican) 69.7%; ▌Emil M. Wulster (Democratic) 30.3%
New Jersey 8	Gordon Canfield	Republican	1940	Incumbent re-elected.	▌ ✓ Gordon Canfield (Republican) 63.6%; ▌Charles H. Roemer (Democratic) 36.0%; ▌Joseph Carie (Fusion) 0.4%
New Jersey 9	Harry L. Towe	Republican	1942	Incumbent re-elected.	▌ ✓ Harry L. Towe (Republican) 57.8%; ▌Karl D. Van Wagner (Democratic) 32.8%; ▌Carl E. Ring (Independent) 9.3%
New Jersey 10	Peter W. Rodino	Democratic	1948	Incumbent re-elected.	▌ ✓ Peter W. Rodino (Democratic) 61.0%; ▌William H. Rawson (Republican) 39.0%
New Jersey 11	Hugh J. Addonizio	Democratic	1948	Incumbent re-elected.	▌ ✓ Hugh J. Addonizio (Democratic) 51.6%; ▌Albert L. Vreeland (Republican) 47.5%; ▌William E. Bohannon (Socialist Workers) 0.9%
New Jersey 12	Robert Kean	Republican	1938	Incumbent re-elected.	▌ ✓ Robert Kean (Republican) 53.1%; ▌Harry Dudkin (Democratic) 44.7%; ▌Katherine A. Van Orden (Progressive) 2.2%
New Jersey 13	Mary Teresa Norton	Democratic	1924	Incumbent retired. Democratic hold.	▌ ✓ Alfred Sieminski (Democratic) 51.9%; ▌Edward S. Binkowski (Republican) 41.4%; ▌Michael A. Fiore (Independent) 6.7%
New Jersey 14	Edward J. Hart	Democratic	1934	Incumbent re-elected.	▌ ✓ Edward J. Hart (Democratic) 59.2%; ▌Michael Bongiovanni (Republican) 40.8%

== New Mexico ==
District	Incumbent	Party	First elected	Result	Candidates
New Mexico at-large	Antonio M. Fernández	Democratic	1942	Incumbent re-elected.	▌ ✓ Antonio M. Fernández (Democratic) 28.8%; ▌ ✓ John J. Dempsey (Democratic) 28.7%; ▌Steiner Mason (Republican) 22.3%; ▌Jose E. Armijo (Republican) 20.3%
New Mexico at-large	John E. Miles	Democratic	1948	Incumbent retired. Democratic hold.	▌ ✓ Antonio M. Fernández (Democratic) 28.8%; ▌ ✓ John J. Dempsey (Democratic) 28.7%; ▌Steiner Mason (Republican) 22.3%; ▌Jose E. Armijo (Republican) 20.3%

== New York ==
District	Incumbent	Party	First elected	Result	Candidates
New York 1	W. Kingsland Macy	Republican	1946	Incumbent lost re-election. Democratic gain.	▌ ✓ Ernest Greenwood (Democratic) 49.2%; ▌W. Kingsland Macy (Republican) 49.1%; ▌Otto Skottedal (American Labor) 1.7%
New York 2	Leonard W. Hall	Republican	1938	Incumbent re-elected.	▌ ✓ Leonard W. Hall (Republican) 67.1%; ▌Lawrence W. McKeown (Democratic) 31.2%; ▌Henry Dolimer (American Labor) 1.7%
New York 3	Henry J. Latham	Republican	1944	Incumbent re-elected.	▌ ✓ Henry J. Latham (Republican) 56.3%; ▌James Pasta (Democratic) 33.6%; ▌Mark Starr (Liberal) 6.8%; ▌Arnold J. Olenick (American Labor) 3.3%
New York 4	L. Gary Clemente	Democratic	1948	Incumbent re-elected.	▌ ✓ L. Gary Clemente (Democratic) 54.2%; ▌Gregory McMahon (Republican) 41.8%; ▌Mary Murphy (American Labor) 4.0%
New York 5	T. Vincent Quinn	Democratic	1948	Incumbent re-elected.	▌ ✓ T. Vincent Quinn (Democratic) 48.4%; ▌Robert Tripp Ross (Republican) 41.1%; ▌Bernard Brown (Liberal) 6.0%; ▌Joseph Shill (American Labor) 4.5%
New York 6	James J. Delaney	Democratic	1944; 1946 (lost); 1948	Incumbent re-elected.	▌ ✓ James J. Delaney (Democratic) 56.8%; ▌Herbert Suppan (Republican) 38.9%; ▌Rose Podmaka (American Labor) 4.3%
New York 7	Louis B. Heller	Democratic	1949	Incumbent re-elected.	▌ ✓ Louis B. Heller (Democratic) 57.0%; ▌Francis E. Dorn (Republican) 36.5%; ▌Lester Zirin (American Labor) 6.5%
New York 8	Joseph L. Pfeifer	Democratic	1934	Incumbent lost renomination. Democratic hold.	▌ ✓ Victor Anfuso (Democratic) 61.9%; ▌Joseph R. Fontanetta (Republican) 27.2%; ▌Antonio Iandiorio (American Labor) 6.0%; ▌August Claessens (Liberal) 4.9%
New York 9	Eugene James Keogh	Democratic	1936	Incumbent re-elected.	▌ ✓ Eugene James Keogh (Democratic) 91.0%; ▌Helen Wishnofsky (American Labor) 9.0%
New York 10	Edna F. Kelly	Democratic	1949	Incumbent re-elected.	▌ ✓ Edna F. Kelly (Democratic) 67.1%; ▌David L. Damuels (Republican) 25.6%; ▌Gerald Root (American Labor) 7.4%
New York 11	James J. Heffernan	Democratic	1940	Incumbent re-elected.	▌ ✓ James J. Heffernan (Democratic) 62.9%; ▌Alfred C. McKenzie (Republican) 29.4%; ▌Blanche K. Katz (American Labor) 7.7%
New York 12	John J. Rooney	Democratic	1944	Incumbent re-elected.	▌ ✓ John J. Rooney (Democratic) 61.6%; ▌Joseph J. Petito (Republican) 33.1%; ▌Vincent J. Longhi (American Labor) 5.3%
New York 13	Donald L. O'Toole	Democratic	1936	Incumbent re-elected.	▌ ✓ Donald L. O'Toole (Democratic) 56.9%; ▌James F. O'Hara (Republican) 36.7%; ▌Ralph Shapiro (American Labor) 6.5%
New York 14	Abraham J. Multer	Democratic	1947	Incumbent re-elected.	▌ ✓ Abraham J. Multer (Democratic) 70.6%; ▌P. Vincent Landi (Republican) 20.1%; ▌Helen Phillips (American Labor) 9.3%
New York 15	Emanuel Celler	Democratic	1922	Incumbent re-elected.	▌ ✓ Emanuel Celler (Democratic) 72.8%; ▌Louis H. Heiger (Republican) 17.2%; ▌William Podell (American Labor) 10.0%
New York 16	James J. Murphy	Democratic	1948	Incumbent re-elected.	▌ ✓ James J. Murphy (Democratic) 50.5%; ▌Edward J. McCormick (Republican) 44.4%; ▌Frank Cremonesi (American Labor) 5.2%
New York 17	Frederic René Coudert Jr.	Republican	1946	Incumbent re-elected.	▌ ✓ Frederic René Coudert Jr. (Republican) 53.4%; ▌Irving M. Engel (Democratic) 41.5%; ▌Robert T. Leicester (American Labor) 5.1%
New York 18	Vito Marcantonio	American; Labor	1938	Incumbent lost re-election. Democratic gain.	▌ ✓ James G. Donovan (Democratic) 57.8%; ▌Vito Marcantonio (American Labor) 42.2%
New York 19	Arthur George Klein	Democratic	1946	Incumbent re-elected.	▌ ✓ Arthur George Klein (Democratic) 66.4%; ▌Edward I. Goldberg (Republican) 23.8%; ▌Bernard Harkavy (American Labor) 9.7%
New York 20	Franklin D. Roosevelt Jr.	Liberal	1949	Incumbent re-elected as a Democrat. Democratic gain.	▌ ✓ Franklin D. Roosevelt Jr. (Democratic) 62.1%; ▌Henry V. Poor (Republican) 31.7%; ▌John W. Darr Jr. (American Labor) 6.2%
New York 21	Jacob K. Javits	Republican	1946	Incumbent re-elected.	▌ ✓ Jacob K. Javits (Republican) 61.8%; ▌Bennett I. Schlessel (Democratic) 32.9%; ▌William Mandel (American Labor) 5.3%
New York 22	Adam Clayton Powell Jr.	Democratic	1944	Incumbent re-elected.	▌ ✓ Adam Clayton Powell Jr. (Democratic) 63.5%; ▌Elmer A. Carter (Republican) 27.4%; ▌John Quillian (American Labor) 9.1%
New York 23	Walter A. Lynch	Democratic	1940	Incumbent retired to run for Governor of New York. Democratic hold.	▌ ✓ Sidney A. Fine (Democratic) 56.3%; ▌William J. Waterman (Republican) 19.4%; ▌Harold Bauman (Liberal) 15.7%; ▌Robert Diamond (Liberal) 8.6%
New York 24	Isidore Dollinger	Democratic	1948	Incumbent re-elected.	▌ ✓ Isidore Dollinger (Democratic) 62.5%; ▌Barnett Levy (Republican) 12.9%; ▌Herman Woskow (Liberal) 12.3%; ▌Stephen J. White (American Labor) 12.3%
New York 25	Charles A. Buckley	Democratic	1934	Incumbent re-elected.	▌ ✓ Charles A. Buckley (Democratic) 46.8%; ▌Solon S. Kane (Republican) 29.5%; ▌Max Bloom (Liberal) 15.2%; ▌Charles J. Hendley (American Labor) 8.5%
New York 26	Christopher C. McGrath	Democratic	1948	Incumbent re-elected.	▌ ✓ Christopher C. McGrath (Democratic) 51.4%; ▌Fred E. Schiemann (Republican) 33.1%; ▌Ernest Doerfler (Liberal) 8.6%; ▌August Buhr (American Labor) 6.9%
New York 27	Ralph W. Gwinn	Republican	1944	Incumbent re-elected.	▌ ✓ Ralph W. Gwinn (Republican) 55.9%; ▌George A. Brenner (Democratic) 42.7%; ▌Michele Cimbalo (American Labor) 1.4%
New York 28	Ralph A. Gamble	Republican	1937	Incumbent re-elected.	▌ ✓ Ralph A. Gamble (Republican) 67.5%; ▌Morris E. Lasker (Democratic) 29.8%; ▌Walter Luftman (Liberal) 1.4%; ▌William K. Maloney (American Labor) 1.4%
New York 29	Katharine St. George	Republican	1946	Incumbent re-elected.	▌ ✓ Katharine St. George (Republican) 61.8%; ▌Harry O. Prince (Democratic) 36.8%; ▌Harold Meredith Chown (American Labor) 1.4%
New York 30	Jay Le Fevre	Republican	1942	Incumbent retired. Republican hold.	▌ ✓ J. Ernest Wharton (Republican) 65.8%; ▌James R. Bourne (Democratic) 32.0%; ▌James F. Green (American Labor) 1.3%; ▌Clarence Silvernail (Liberal) 1.0%
New York 31	Bernard W. Kearney	Republican	1942	Incumbent re-elected.	▌ ✓ Bernard W. Kearney (Republican) 64.1%; ▌John H. Peterson (Democratic) 33.8%; ▌Paul F. Hacko (American Labor) 1.5%; ▌Herbert M. Merrill (Liberal) 0.6%
New York 32	William T. Byrne	Democratic	1936	Incumbent re-elected.	▌ ✓ William T. Byrne (Democratic) 58.8%; ▌John T. Casey (Republican) 39.1%; ▌Janet Scott (American Labor) 2.1%
New York 33	Dean P. Taylor	Republican	1942	Incumbent re-elected.	▌ ✓ Dean P. Taylor (Republican) 68.9%; ▌Joseph T. Hammer (Democratic) 29.3%; ▌George LaFortune (American Labor) 1.3%; ▌John H. Sullivan (Liberal) 0.5%
New York 34	Clarence E. Kilburn	Republican	1940	Incumbent re-elected.	▌ ✓ Clarence E. Kilburn (Republican) 66.4%; ▌Mildred McGill (Democratic) 31.8%; ▌Carl H. Bogardus (American Labor) 1.3%; ▌William J. Delo Jr. (Liberal) 0.6%
New York 35	John C. Davies II	Democratic	1948	Incumbent lost re-election. Republican gain.	▌ ✓ William R. Williams (Republican) 51.6%; ▌John C. Davies II (Democratic) 46.2%; ▌Ross Maracchion (American Labor) 2.2%
New York 36	R. Walter Riehlman	Republican	1946	Incumbent re-elected.	▌ ✓ R. Walter Riehlman (Republican) 61.9%; ▌Alfred W. Haight (Democratic) 38.1%
New York 37	Edwin Arthur Hall	Republican	1939	Incumbent re-elected.	▌ ✓ Edwin Arthur Hall (Republican) 64.6%; ▌John J. Burns (Democratic) 35.4%
New York 38	John Taber	Republican	1922	Incumbent re-elected.	▌ ✓ John Taber (Republican) 68.8%; ▌Robert G. Gordon (Democratic) 31.2%
New York 39	W. Sterling Cole	Republican	1934	Incumbent re-elected.	▌ ✓ W. Sterling Cole (Republican) 66.3%; ▌Donald J. O'Connor (Democratic) 32.6%; ▌Grace W. Hill (American Labor) 1.1%
New York 40	Kenneth B. Keating	Republican	1946	Incumbent re-elected.	▌ ✓ Kenneth B. Keating (Republican) 65.8%; ▌A. Roger Clarke (Democratic) 33.2%; ▌Marie D'Amico (American Labor) 1.0%
New York 41	James W. Wadsworth Jr.	Republican	1932	Incumbent retired. Republican hold.	▌ ✓ Harold C. Ostertag (Republican) 64.1%; ▌Bernard E. Hart (Democratic) 35.0%; ▌Helen Lopez (American Labor) 0.9%
New York 42	William L. Pfeiffer	Republican	1948	Incumbent retired. Republican hold.	▌ ✓ William E. Miller (Republican) 58.6%; ▌Mary Louise Nice (Democratic) 41.4%
New York 43	Anthony F. Tauriello	Democratic	1948	Incumbent lost re-election. Republican gain.	▌ ✓ Edmund P. Radwan (Republican) 50.8%; ▌Anthony F. Tauriello (Democratic) 48.0%; ▌Michael Clune (American Labor) 1.2%
New York 44	Chester C. Gorski	Democratic	1948	Incumbent lost re-election. Republican gain.	▌ ✓ John Cornelius Butler (Republican) 50.2%; ▌Chester C. Gorski (Democratic) 48.3%; ▌Rufus Frasier (American Labor) 1.5%
New York 45	Daniel A. Reed	Republican	1918	Incumbent re-elected.	▌ ✓ Daniel A. Reed (Republican) 66.0%; ▌Frederick S. Buck (Democratic) 33.1%; ▌Elmer Olson (Liberal) 0.9%

== North Carolina ==
District	Incumbent	Party	First elected	Result	Candidates
North Carolina 1	Herbert C. Bonner	Democratic	1940	Incumbent re-elected.	▌ ✓ Herbert C. Bonner (Democratic) 92.8%; ▌Zeno O. Ratcliff (Republican) 7.2%
North Carolina 2	John H. Kerr	Democratic	1923	Incumbent re-elected.	▌ ✓ John H. Kerr (Democratic); Uncontested
North Carolina 3	Graham Arthur Barden	Democratic	1934	Incumbent re-elected.	▌ ✓ Graham Arthur Barden (Democratic); Uncontested
North Carolina 4	Harold D. Cooley	Democratic	1934	Incumbent re-elected.	▌ ✓ Harold D. Cooley (Democratic) 72.8%; ▌Ray F. Swain (Republican) 27.2%
North Carolina 5	R. Thurmond Chatham	Democratic	1948	Incumbent re-elected.	▌ ✓ R. Thurmond Chatham (Democratic); Uncontested
North Carolina 6	Carl T. Durham	Democratic	1938	Incumbent re-elected.	▌ ✓ Carl T. Durham (Democratic) 75.4%; ▌A. A. McDonald (Republican) 24.6%
North Carolina 7	Frank Ertel Carlyle	Democratic	1948	Incumbent re-elected.	▌ ✓ Frank Ertel Carlyle (Democratic) 84.0%; ▌Irvin B. Tucker Jr. (Republican) 16.0%
North Carolina 8	Charles B. Deane	Democratic	1946	Incumbent re-elected.	▌ ✓ Charles B. Deane (Democratic) 59.6%; ▌T. E. Story (Republican) 40.4%
North Carolina 9	Robert L. Doughton	Democratic	1910	Incumbent re-elected.	▌ ✓ Robert L. Doughton (Democratic) 61.1%; ▌Fate J. Beal (Republican) 38.9%
North Carolina 10	Hamilton C. Jones	Democratic	1946	Incumbent re-elected.	▌ ✓ Hamilton C. Jones (Democratic) 52.3%; ▌Louis G. Rogers (Republican) 47.7%
North Carolina 11	Alfred L. Bulwinkle	Democratic	1930	Incumbent died. Democratic hold.	▌ ✓ Woodrow W. Jones (Democratic) 68.9%; ▌A. W. Whitehurst (Republican) 31.1%
North Carolina 12	Monroe Minor Redden	Democratic	1946	Incumbent re-elected.	▌ ✓ Monroe Minor Redden (Democratic) 63.7%; ▌John A. Wagner (Republican) 36.3%

== North Dakota ==
District	Incumbent	Party	First elected	Result	Candidates
North Dakota at-large	Usher L. Burdick	Republican-NPL	1948	Incumbent re-elected.	▌ ✓ Fred G. Aandahl (Republican) 36.6%; ▌ ✓ Usher L. Burdick (Republican-NPL) 34.0%; ▌Ervin Schumacher (Democratic) 19.2%; ▌E. A. Johansson (Democratic) 10.1%
North Dakota at-large	William Lemke	Republican-NPL	1942	Incumbent died. Republican hold.	▌ ✓ Fred G. Aandahl (Republican) 36.6%; ▌ ✓ Usher L. Burdick (Republican-NPL) 34.0%; ▌Ervin Schumacher (Democratic) 19.2%; ▌E. A. Johansson (Democratic) 10.1%

== Ohio ==
District	Incumbent	Party	First elected	Result	Candidates
Ohio 1	Charles H. Elston	Republican	1938	Incumbent re-elected.	▌ ✓ Charles H. Elston (Republican) 59.0%; ▌Rollin H. Everett (Democratic) 41.0%
Ohio 2	Earl T. Wagner	Democratic	1948	Incumbent lost re-election. Republican gain.	▌ ✓ William E. Hess (Republican) 52.7%; ▌Earl T. Wagner (Democratic) 47.3%
Ohio 3	Edward G. Breen	Democratic	1948	Incumbent re-elected.	▌ ✓ Edward G. Breen (Democratic) 54.5%; ▌Paul F. Schenck (Republican) 45.5%
Ohio 4	William Moore McCulloch	Republican	1947	Incumbent re-elected.	▌ ✓ William Moore McCulloch (Republican) 66.8%; ▌Carleton Carl Reiser (Democratic) 33.2%
Ohio 5	Cliff Clevenger	Republican	1938	Incumbent re-elected.	▌ ✓ Cliff Clevenger (Republican) 57.5%; ▌Dan Batt (Democratic) 42.5%
Ohio 6	James G. Polk	Democratic	1948	Incumbent re-elected.	▌ ✓ James G. Polk (Democratic) 50.8%; ▌Edward O. McCowen (Republican) 49.2%
Ohio 7	Clarence J. Brown	Republican	1938	Incumbent re-elected.	▌ ✓ Clarence J. Brown (Republican) 68.4%; ▌Ben J. Goldman (Democratic) 31.6%
Ohio 8	Frederick Cleveland Smith	Republican	1938	Incumbent retired. Republican hold.	▌ ✓ Jackson Edward Betts (Republican) 62.7%; ▌W. Dexter Hazen (Democratic) 37.3%
Ohio 9	Thomas Henry Burke	Democratic	1948	Incumbent lost re-election. Independent gain.	▌ ✓ Frazier Reams (Independent) 36.6%; ▌Thomas Henry Burke (Democratic) 32.4%; ▌Homer A. Ramey (Republican) 31.0%
Ohio 10	Thomas A. Jenkins	Republican	1924	Incumbent re-elected.	▌ ✓ Thomas A. Jenkins (Republican) 65.2%; ▌William J. Curry (Democratic) 34.8%
Ohio 11	Walter E. Brehm	Republican	1942	Incumbent re-elected.	▌ ✓ Walter E. Brehm (Republican) 53.1%; ▌Mell G. Underwood Jr. (Democratic) 46.9%
Ohio 12	John Martin Vorys	Republican	1938	Incumbent re-elected.	▌ ✓ John Martin Vorys (Republican) 64.1%; ▌John W. Guy (Democratic) 35.9%
Ohio 13	Alvin F. Weichel	Republican	1942	Incumbent re-elected.	▌ ✓ Alvin F. Weichel (Republican) 70.9%; ▌Dwight A. Blackmore (Democratic) 29.1%
Ohio 14	Walter B. Huber	Democratic	1944	Incumbent lost re-election. Republican gain.	▌ ✓ William Hanes Ayres (Republican) 48.7%; ▌Walter B. Huber (Democratic) 47.8%; ▌Robert G. Brenneman (Independent) 3.4%
Ohio 15	Robert T. Secrest	Democratic	1948	Incumbent re-elected.	▌ ✓ Robert T. Secrest (Democratic) 61.6%; ▌Holland M. Gary (Republican) 38.4%
Ohio 16	John McSweeney	Democratic	1948	Incumbent lost re-election. Republican gain.	▌ ✓ Frank T. Bow (Republican) 50.7%; ▌John McSweeney (Democratic) 49.3%
Ohio 17	J. Harry McGregor	Republican	1940	Incumbent re-elected.	▌ ✓ J. Harry McGregor (Republican) 64.2%; ▌Robert W. Levering (Democratic) 35.8%
Ohio 18	Wayne Hays	Democratic	1948	Incumbent re-elected.	▌ ✓ Wayne Hays (Democratic) 50.8%; ▌Robert L. Quinn (Republican) 49.2%
Ohio 19	Michael J. Kirwan	Democratic	1936	Incumbent re-elected.	▌ ✓ Michael J. Kirwan (Democratic) 63.8%; ▌Henry P. Kosling (Republican) 36.2%
Ohio 20	Michael A. Feighan	Democratic	1942	Incumbent re-elected.	▌ ✓ Michael A. Feighan (Democratic) 74.2%; ▌Paul W. Cassidy (Republican) 25.8%
Ohio 21	Robert Crosser	Democratic	1922	Incumbent re-elected.	▌ ✓ Robert Crosser (Democratic) 75.4%; ▌William Hodge (Republican) 24.6%
Ohio 22	Frances P. Bolton	Republican	1940	Incumbent re-elected.	▌ ✓ Frances P. Bolton (Republican) 62.7%; ▌Chat Paterson (Democratic) 37.3%
Ohio at-large	Stephen M. Young	Democratic	1948	Incumbent lost re-election. Republican gain.	▌ ✓ George H. Bender (Republican) 53.9%; ▌Stephen M. Young (Democratic) 46.1%

== Oklahoma ==
District	Incumbent	Party	First elected	Result	Candidates
Oklahoma 1	Dixie Gilmer	Democratic	1948	Incumbent lost re-election. Republican gain.	▌ ✓ George B. Schwabe (Republican) 52.9%; ▌Dixie Gilmer (Democratic) 47.1%
Oklahoma 2	William G. Stigler	Democratic	1944	Incumbent re-elected.	▌ ✓ William G. Stigler (Democratic) 66.2%; ▌Cleo Crain (Republican) 33.8%
Oklahoma 3	Carl Albert	Democratic	1946	Incumbent re-elected.	▌ ✓ Carl Albert (Democratic) 82.8%; ▌Charles Powell (Republican) 17.2%
Oklahoma 4	Tom Steed	Democratic	1948	Incumbent re-elected.	▌ ✓ Tom Steed (Democratic) 68.1%; ▌Glenn O. Young (Republican) 31.9%
Oklahoma 5	Mike Monroney	Democratic	1938	Incumbent retired to run for U.S. senator. Democratic hold.	▌ ✓ John Jarman (Democratic) 58.8%; ▌C. E. Barnes (Republican) 41.2%
Oklahoma 6	Toby Morris	Democratic	1946	Incumbent re-elected.	▌ ✓ Toby Morris (Democratic) 67.1%; ▌George Campbell (Republican) 32.9%
Oklahoma 7	Victor Wickersham	Democratic	1948	Incumbent re-elected.	▌ ✓ Victor Wickersham (Democratic) 67.1%; ▌K. B. Cornell (Republican) 32.9%
Oklahoma 8	George H. Wilson	Democratic	1948	Incumbent lost re-election. Republican gain.	▌ ✓ Page Belcher (Republican) 53.4%; ▌George H. Wilson (Democratic) 46.6%

== Oregon ==
District	Incumbent	Party	First elected	Result	Candidates
Oregon 1	A. Walter Norblad	Republican	1946	Incumbent re-elected.	▌ ✓ A. Walter Norblad (Republican) 66.5%; ▌Roy R. Hewitt (Democratic) 33.5%
Oregon 2	Lowell Stockman	Republican	1942	Incumbent re-elected.	▌ ✓ Lowell Stockman (Republican) 55.4%; ▌Vernon Bull (Democratic) 44.6%
Oregon 3	Homer D. Angell	Republican	1938	Incumbent re-elected.	▌ ✓ Homer D. Angell (Republican) 50.7%; ▌Carl C. Donaugh (Democratic) 43.6%; ▌A. W. Lafferty (Independent) 4.1%; ▌Vaughn S. Albertson (Progressive) 1.6%
Oregon 4	Harris Ellsworth	Republican	1942	Incumbent re-elected.	▌ ✓ Harris Ellsworth (Republican) 59.5%; ▌David C. Shaw (Democratic) 40.5%

== Pennsylvania ==
District	Incumbent	Party	First elected	Result	Candidates
Pennsylvania 1	William A. Barrett	Democratic	1944; 1946 (lost); 1948	Incumbent re-elected.	▌ ✓ William A. Barrett (Democratic) 53.8%; ▌Robert M. Sebastian (Republican) 46.2%
Pennsylvania 2	William T. Granahan	Democratic	1948	Incumbent re-elected.	▌ ✓ William T. Granahan (Democratic) 57.0%; ▌Max Slepin (Republican) 43.0%
Pennsylvania 3	Hardie Scott	Republican	1946	Incumbent re-elected.	▌ ✓ Hardie Scott (Republican) 50.3%; ▌Maurice S. Osser (Democratic) 49.7%
Pennsylvania 4	Earl Chudoff	Democratic	1948	Incumbent re-elected.	▌ ✓ Earl Chudoff (Democratic) 57.5%; ▌Theodore O. Spaulding (Republican) 42.5%
Pennsylvania 5	William J. Green Jr.	Democratic	1948	Incumbent re-elected.	▌ ✓ William J. Green Jr. (Democratic) 55.5%; ▌George W. Sarbacher Jr. (Republican) 44.5%
Pennsylvania 6	Hugh Scott	Republican	1946	Incumbent re-elected.	▌ ✓ Hugh Scott (Republican) 50.0%; ▌Ethan Allen Doty (Democratic) 49.7%; ▌Kenneth R. Forbes (Progressive) 0.3%
Pennsylvania 7	Benjamin F. James	Republican	1948	Incumbent re-elected.	▌ ✓ Benjamin F. James (Republican) 62.7%; ▌Hubert P. Earle (Democratic) 37.3%
Pennsylvania 8	Franklin H. Lichtenwalter	Republican	1947	Incumbent retired. Republican hold.	▌ ✓ Albert C. Vaughn (Republican) 58.2%; ▌George F. Kane (Democratic) 41.8%
Pennsylvania 9	Paul B. Dague	Republican	1946	Incumbent re-elected.	▌ ✓ Paul B. Dague (Republican) 67.2%; ▌Philip Ragan (Democratic) 32.8%
Pennsylvania 10	Harry P. O'Neill	Democratic	1948	Incumbent re-elected.	▌ ✓ Harry P. O'Neill (Democratic) 51.5%; ▌Fraser P. Donlan (Republican) 48.5%
Pennsylvania 11	Daniel Flood	Democratic	1944; 1946 (lost); 1948	Incumbent re-elected.	▌ ✓ Daniel Flood (Democratic) 54.4%; ▌Elwood H. Jones (Republican) 45.6%
Pennsylvania 12	Ivor D. Fenton	Republican	1938	Incumbent re-elected.	▌ ✓ Ivor D. Fenton (Republican) 56.8%; ▌James H. Gildea (Democratic) 43.2%
Pennsylvania 13	George M. Rhodes	Democratic	1948	Incumbent re-elected.	▌ ✓ George M. Rhodes (Democratic) 49.8%; ▌James W. Bertolet (Republican) 47.5%; ▌Darlington Hoopes (Socialist) 2.7%
Pennsylvania 14	Wilson D. Gillette	Republican	1941	Incumbent re-elected.	▌ ✓ Wilson D. Gillette (Republican) 60.9%; ▌John E. Snedeker (Democratic) 39.1%
Pennsylvania 15	Robert F. Rich	Republican	1944	Incumbent retired. Republican hold.	▌ ✓ Alvin Bush (Republican) 60.7%; ▌Paul A. Rothfuss (Democratic) 36.6%; ▌A. Monroe Hall (Progressive) 2.7%
Pennsylvania 16	Samuel K. McConnell Jr.	Republican	1944	Incumbent re-elected.	▌ ✓ Samuel K. McConnell Jr. (Republican) 66.1%; ▌Leon C. MacMullen (Democratic) 33.9%
Pennsylvania 17	Richard M. Simpson	Republican	1937	Incumbent re-elected.	▌ ✓ Richard M. Simpson (Republican) 62.8%; ▌James L. Gatins (Democratic) 37.2%
Pennsylvania 18	John C. Kunkel	Republican	1938	Incumbent retired to run for U.S. senator. Republican hold.	▌ ✓ Walter M. Mumma (Republican) 63.7%; ▌James M. Quigley (Democratic) 36.3%
Pennsylvania 19	Leon H. Gavin	Republican	1942	Incumbent re-elected.	▌ ✓ Leon H. Gavin (Republican) 62.8%; ▌Fred C. Barr (Democratic) 37.2%
Pennsylvania 20	Francis E. Walter	Democratic	1932	Incumbent re-elected.	▌ ✓ Francis E. Walter (Democratic) 58.3%; ▌George M. Berg (Republican) 41.7%
Pennsylvania 21	James F. Lind	Democratic	1948	Incumbent re-elected.	▌ ✓ James F. Lind (Democratic) 52.2%; ▌Francis Worley (Republican) 47.8%
Pennsylvania 22	James E. Van Zandt	Republican	1946	Incumbent re-elected.	▌ ✓ James E. Van Zandt (Republican) 59.5%; ▌Arthur H. Reede (Democratic) 40.5%
Pennsylvania 23	Anthony Cavalcante	Democratic	1948	Incumbent lost re-election. Republican gain.	▌ ✓ Edward L. Sittler Jr. (Republican) 51.8%; ▌Anthony Cavalcante (Democratic) 48.2%
Pennsylvania 24	Thomas E. Morgan	Democratic	1944	Incumbent re-elected.	▌ ✓ Thomas E. Morgan (Democratic) 59.1%; ▌John J. Cairns Jr. (Republican) 40.9%
Pennsylvania 25	Louis E. Graham	Republican	1938	Incumbent re-elected.	▌ ✓ Louis E. Graham (Republican) 52.4%; ▌Samuel Gunnett Neff (Democratic) 47.6%
Pennsylvania 26	John P. Saylor	Republican	1949	Incumbent re-elected.	▌ ✓ John P. Saylor (Republican) 52.5%; ▌Lewis E. Evans (Democratic) 47.5%
Pennsylvania 27	Augustine B. Kelley	Democratic	1940	Incumbent re-elected.	▌ ✓ Augustine B. Kelley (Democratic) 57.1%; ▌George E. Berry Jr. (Republican) 42.9%
Pennsylvania 28	Carroll D. Kearns	Republican	1946	Incumbent re-elected.	▌ ✓ Carroll D. Kearns (Republican) 57.0%; ▌Steve Filipkowski (Democratic) 43.0%
Pennsylvania 29	Harry J. Davenport	Democratic	1948	Incumbent lost re-election. Republican gain.	▌ ✓ Harmar D. Denny Jr. (Republican) 52.6%; ▌Harry J. Davenport (Democratic) 46.9%; ▌Herbert Glickman (Progressive) 0.5%
Pennsylvania 30	Robert J. Corbett	Republican	1938; 1940 (lost); 1944	Incumbent re-elected.	▌ ✓ Robert J. Corbett (Republican) 56.5%; ▌J. R. Montgomery (Democratic) 43.5%
Pennsylvania 31	James G. Fulton	Republican	1944	Incumbent re-elected.	▌ ✓ James G. Fulton (Republican) 67.5%; ▌Wilber I. Newstetter Jr. (Democratic) 32.5%
Pennsylvania 32	Herman P. Eberharter	Democratic	1936	Incumbent re-elected.	▌ ✓ Herman P. Eberharter (Democratic) 68.7%; ▌James P. Dougherty (Republican) 31.3%
Pennsylvania 33	Frank Buchanan	Democratic	1946	Incumbent re-elected.	▌ ✓ Frank Buchanan (Democratic) 65.8%; ▌Cornelius McLaughlin Sr. (Republican) 34.2%

== Rhode Island ==
District	Incumbent	Party	First elected	Result	Candidates
Rhode Island 1	Aime Forand	Democratic	1940	Incumbent re-elected.	▌ ✓ Aime Forand (Democratic) 63.2%; ▌Francis R. Foley (Republican) 36.8%
Rhode Island 2	John E. Fogarty	Democratic	1940	Incumbent re-elected.	▌ ✓ John E. Fogarty (Democratic) 60.6%; ▌Wilford S. Budlong (Republican) 39.4%

== South Carolina ==
District	Incumbent	Party	First elected	Result	Candidates
South Carolina 1	L. Mendel Rivers	Democratic	1940	Incumbent re-elected.	▌ ✓ L. Mendel Rivers (Democratic); Uncontested
South Carolina 2	Hugo S. Sims Jr.	Democratic	1948	Incumbent lost renomination. Democratic hold.	▌ ✓ John J. Riley (Democratic); Uncontested
South Carolina 3	James Butler Hare	Democratic	1948	Incumbent lost renomination. Democratic hold.	▌ ✓ William Jennings Bryan Dorn (Democratic); Uncontested
South Carolina 4	Joseph R. Bryson	Democratic	1938	Incumbent re-elected.	▌ ✓ Joseph R. Bryson (Democratic); Uncontested
South Carolina 5	James P. Richards	Democratic	1932	Incumbent re-elected.	▌ ✓ James P. Richards (Democratic); Uncontested
South Carolina 6	John L. McMillan	Democratic	1938	Incumbent re-elected.	▌ ✓ John L. McMillan (Democratic); Uncontested

== South Dakota ==
District	Incumbent	Party	First elected	Result	Candidates
South Dakota 1	Harold Lovre	Republican	1948	Incumbent re-elected.	▌ ✓ Harold Lovre (Republican) 60.8%; ▌Merton B. Tice (Democratic) 39.2%
South Dakota 2	Francis H. Case	Republican	1936	Incumbent retired to run for U.S. senator. Republican hold.	▌ ✓ Ellis Yarnal Berry (Republican) 60.3%; ▌Sam H. Bober (Democratic) 39.7%

== Tennessee ==
District	Incumbent	Party	First elected	Result	Candidates
Tennessee 1	Dayton E. Phillips	Republican	1946	Incumbent lost renomination; defeated as an independent. Republican hold.	▌ ✓ B. Carroll Reece (Republican) 46.5%; ▌Dayton E. Phillips (Independent) 28.1%; ▌Kyle K. King (Democratic) 25.5%
Tennessee 2	John Jennings	Republican	1939	Incumbent lost renomination. Republican hold.	▌ ✓ Howard Baker Sr. (Republican) 52.2%; ▌Frank W. Wilson (Democratic) 47.8%
Tennessee 3	James B. Frazier Jr.	Democratic	1948	Incumbent re-elected.	▌ ✓ James B. Frazier Jr. (Democratic); Uncontested
Tennessee 4	Albert Gore Sr.	Democratic	1938	Incumbent re-elected.	▌ ✓ Albert Gore Sr. (Democratic); Uncontested
Tennessee 5	Joe L. Evins	Democratic	1946	Incumbent re-elected.	▌ ✓ Joe L. Evins (Democratic); Uncontested
Tennessee 6	Percy Priest	Democratic	1940	Incumbent re-elected.	▌ ✓ Percy Priest (Democratic) 65.9%; ▌James W. Perkins (Independent) 34.1%
Tennessee 7	James Patrick Sutton	Democratic	1948	Incumbent re-elected.	▌ ✓ James Patrick Sutton (Democratic); Uncontested
Tennessee 8	Tom J. Murray	Democratic	1942	Incumbent re-elected.	▌ ✓ Tom J. Murray (Democratic); Uncontested
Tennessee 9	Jere Cooper	Democratic	1928	Incumbent re-elected.	▌ ✓ Jere Cooper (Democratic); Uncontested
Tennessee 10	Clifford Davis	Democratic	1940	Incumbent re-elected.	▌ ✓ Clifford Davis (Democratic); Uncontested

== Texas ==
District	Incumbent	Party	First elected	Result	Candidates
Texas 1	Wright Patman	Democratic	1928	Incumbent re-elected.	▌ ✓ Wright Patman (Democratic); Uncontested
Texas 2	Jesse M. Combs	Democratic	1944	Incumbent re-elected.	▌ ✓ Jesse M. Combs (Democratic); Uncontested
Texas 3	Lindley Beckworth	Democratic	1938	Incumbent re-elected.	▌ ✓ Lindley Beckworth (Democratic) 91.1%; ▌R. E. Kennedy (Republican) 8.9%
Texas 4	Sam Rayburn	Democratic	1912	Incumbent re-elected.	▌ ✓ Sam Rayburn (Democratic); Uncontested
Texas 5	Joseph Franklin Wilson	Democratic	1946	Incumbent re-elected.	▌ ✓ Joseph Franklin Wilson (Democratic); Uncontested
Texas 6	Olin E. Teague	Democratic	1946	Incumbent re-elected.	▌ ✓ Olin E. Teague (Democratic) 98.1%; ▌Mose R. Blumrosen (Republican) 1.9%
Texas 7	Tom Pickett	Democratic	1944	Incumbent re-elected.	▌ ✓ Tom Pickett (Democratic); Uncontested
Texas 8	Albert Thomas	Democratic	1936	Incumbent re-elected.	▌ ✓ Albert Thomas (Democratic) 77.8%; ▌B. F. Hanna (Republican) 22.2%
Texas 9	Clark W. Thompson	Democratic	1947	Incumbent re-elected.	▌ ✓ Clark W. Thompson (Democratic); Uncontested
Texas 10	Homer Thornberry	Democratic	1948	Incumbent re-elected.	▌ ✓ Homer Thornberry (Democratic); Uncontested
Texas 11	William R. Poage	Democratic	1936	Incumbent re-elected.	▌ ✓ William R. Poage (Democratic); Uncontested
Texas 12	Wingate H. Lucas	Democratic	1946	Incumbent re-elected.	▌ ✓ Wingate H. Lucas (Democratic) 80.6%; ▌Harold G. Neely (Republican) 19.4%
Texas 13	Ed Gossett	Democratic	1938	Incumbent re-elected.	▌ ✓ Ed Gossett (Democratic); Uncontested
Texas 14	John E. Lyle Jr.	Democratic	1944	Incumbent re-elected.	▌ ✓ John E. Lyle Jr. (Democratic); Uncontested
Texas 15	Lloyd Bentsen	Democratic	1948	Incumbent re-elected.	▌ ✓ Lloyd Bentsen (Democratic); Uncontested
Texas 16	Kenneth M. Regan	Democratic	1947	Incumbent re-elected.	▌ ✓ Kenneth M. Regan (Democratic); Uncontested
Texas 17	Omar Burleson	Democratic	1946	Incumbent re-elected.	▌ ✓ Omar Burleson (Democratic); Uncontested
Texas 18	Ben H. Guill	Republican	1950	Incumbent lost re-election. Democratic gain.	▌ ✓ Walter E. Rogers (Democratic) 52.5%; ▌Ben H. Guill (Republican) 47.5%
Texas 19	George H. Mahon	Democratic	1934	Incumbent re-elected.	▌ ✓ George H. Mahon (Democratic) 93.9%; ▌Mohler D. Temple (Republican) 6.1%
Texas 20	Paul J. Kilday	Democratic	1938	Incumbent re-elected.	▌ ✓ Paul J. Kilday (Democratic); Uncontested
Texas 21	O. C. Fisher	Democratic	1942	Incumbent re-elected.	▌ ✓ O. C. Fisher (Democratic); Uncontested

== Utah ==
District	Incumbent	Party	First elected	Result	Candidates
Utah 1	Walter K. Granger	Democratic	1940	Incumbent re-elected.	▌ ✓ Walter K. Granger (Democratic) 51.1%; ▌Preston L. Jones (Republican) 48.9%
Utah 2	Reva Beck Bosone	Democratic	1948	Incumbent re-elected.	▌ ✓ Reva Beck Bosone (Democratic) 53.4%; ▌Ivy Baker Priest (Republican) 46.6%

== Vermont ==
District	Incumbent	Party	First elected	Result	Candidates
Vermont at-large	Charles Albert Plumley	Republican	1934	Incumbent retired. Republican hold.	▌ ✓ Winston L. Prouty (Republican) 73.5%; ▌Herbert B. Comings (Democratic) 25.6%; ▌Birney F. Combs (Constitutional) 1.0%

== Virginia ==
District	Incumbent	Party	First elected	Result	Candidates
Virginia 1	Edward J. Robeson Jr.	Democratic	1950 (special)	Incumbent re-elected.	▌ ✓ Edward J. Robeson Jr. (Democratic) 81.0%; ▌Nile Straughan (Republican) 10.9%; ▌Stanley S. Garner (Independent) 8.1%
Virginia 2	Porter Hardy Jr.	Democratic	1946	Incumbent re-elected.	▌ ✓ Porter Hardy Jr. (Democratic); Uncontested
Virginia 3	J. Vaughan Gary	Democratic	1945	Incumbent re-elected.	▌ ✓ J. Vaughan Gary (Democratic) 89.7%; ▌Phronia A. McNeill (Progressive) 6.4%; ▌Kathryn Berstein (Social Democratic) 3.9%
Virginia 4	Watkins Abbitt	Democratic	1948	Incumbent re-elected.	▌ ✓ Watkins Abbitt (Democratic); Uncontested
Virginia 5	Thomas B. Stanley	Democratic	1946	Incumbent re-elected.	▌ ✓ Thomas B. Stanley (Democratic); Uncontested
Virginia 6	Clarence G. Burton	Democratic	1948	Incumbent re-elected.	▌ ✓ Clarence G. Burton (Democratic); Uncontested
Virginia 7	Burr Harrison	Democratic	1946	Incumbent re-elected.	▌ ✓ Burr Harrison (Democratic) 69.4%; ▌J. A. Garber (Republican) 30.6%
Virginia 8	Howard W. Smith	Democratic	1930	Incumbent re-elected.	▌ ✓ Howard W. Smith (Democratic) 57.2%; ▌Tyrrell Krum (Republican) 40.6%; ▌Clarke T. Robb (Social Democratic) 2.2%
Virginia 9	Thomas B. Fugate	Democratic	1948	Incumbent re-elected.	▌ ✓ Thomas B. Fugate (Democratic) 58.4%; ▌George C. Sutherland (Republican) 41.6%

== Washington ==
District	Incumbent	Party	First elected	Result	Candidates
Washington 1	Hugh Mitchell	Democratic	1948	Incumbent re-elected.	▌ ✓ Hugh Mitchell (Democratic) 51.4%; ▌F. F. Powell (Republican) 47.9%; Others: ▌Paul M. Bowen (Independent) 0.5%; ▌Daniel Roberts (Socialist Workers) 0.2%
Washington 2	Henry M. Jackson	Democratic	1940	Incumbent re-elected.	▌ ✓ Henry M. Jackson (Democratic) 61.2%; ▌Herb Wilson (Republican) 38.2%; ▌Verle F. Hemeke (Progressive) 0.6%
Washington 3	Russell V. Mack	Republican	1947	Incumbent re-elected.	▌ ✓ Russell V. Mack (Republican) 52.9%; ▌Gordon M. Quarnstrom (Democratic) 46.8%; ▌L. C. Huntamer (Progressive) 0.3%
Washington 4	Hal Holmes	Republican	1942	Incumbent re-elected.	▌ ✓ Hal Holmes (Republican) 64.3%; ▌Ted Little (Democratic) 35.7%
Washington 5	Walt Horan	Republican	1942	Incumbent re-elected.	▌ ✓ Walt Horan (Republican) 54.8%; ▌Robert Dellwo (Democratic) 45.2%
Washington 6	Thor C. Tollefson	Republican	1946	Incumbent re-elected.	▌ ✓ Thor C. Tollefson (Republican) 60.5%; ▌John M. Coffee (Democratic) 38.9%; ▌Baba Jean Decker (Progressive) 0.6%

== West Virginia ==
District	Incumbent	Party	First elected	Result	Candidates
West Virginia 1	Robert L. Ramsay	Democratic	1948	Incumbent re-elected.	▌ ✓ Robert L. Ramsay (Democratic) 51.7%; ▌Francis J. Love (Republican) 48.3%
West Virginia 2	Harley Orrin Staggers	Democratic	1948	Incumbent re-elected.	▌ ✓ Harley Orrin Staggers (Democratic) 54.3%; ▌Melvin C. Snyder (Republican) 45.7%
West Virginia 3	Cleveland M. Bailey	Democratic	1948	Incumbent re-elected.	▌ ✓ Cleveland M. Bailey (Democratic) 54.4%; ▌Rush Holt Sr. (Republican) 45.6%
West Virginia 4	Maurice G. Burnside	Democratic	1948	Incumbent re-elected.	▌ ✓ Maurice G. Burnside (Democratic) 51.6%; ▌Hubert S. Ellis (Republican) 48.4%
West Virginia 5	John Kee	Democratic	1932	Incumbent re-elected.	▌ ✓ John Kee (Democratic) 65.7%; ▌Arnold G. Porterfield (Republican) 34.3%
West Virginia 6	E. H. Hedrick	Democratic	1944	Incumbent re-elected.	▌ ✓ E. H. Hedrick (Democratic) 61.6%; ▌Latelle M. LaFollette Jr. (Republican) 38.4%

== Wisconsin ==
District	Incumbent	Party	First elected	Result	Candidates
Wisconsin 1	Lawrence H. Smith	Republican	1941	Incumbent re-elected.	▌ ✓ Lawrence H. Smith (Republican) 57.2%; ▌Jack Harvey (Democratic) 42.8%
Wisconsin 2	Glenn Robert Davis	Republican	1947	Incumbent re-elected.	▌ ✓ Glenn Robert Davis (Republican) 57.6%; ▌Horace W. Wilkie (Democratic) 42.2%; ▌Nathan Sadowsky (Social-Democratic) 0.2%
Wisconsin 3	Gardner R. Withrow	Republican	1948	Incumbent re-elected.	▌ ✓ Gardner R. Withrow (Republican) 58.8%; ▌Patrick Lucey (Democratic) 41.0%; ▌Walter Alexander (Social-Democratic) 0.2%
Wisconsin 4	Clement J. Zablocki	Democratic	1948	Incumbent re-elected.	▌ ✓ Clement J. Zablocki (Democratic) 60.9%; ▌John C. Brophy (Republican) 39.1%
Wisconsin 5	Andrew Biemiller	Democratic	1948	Incumbent lost re-election. Republican gain.	▌ ✓ Charles J. Kersten (Republican) 51.6%; ▌Andrew Biemiller (Democratic) 48.4%
Wisconsin 6	Frank Bateman Keefe	Republican	1938	Incumbent retired. Republican hold.	▌ ✓ William Van Pelt (Republican) 65.0%; ▌Kenneth Kunde (Democratic) 35.0%
Wisconsin 7	Reid F. Murray	Republican	1938	Incumbent re-elected.	▌ ✓ Reid F. Murray (Republican) 68.3%; ▌Edward G. Gilbertson (Democratic) 31.7%
Wisconsin 8	John W. Byrnes	Republican	1944	Incumbent re-elected.	▌ ✓ John W. Byrnes (Republican) 62.0%; ▌John W. Reynolds Jr. (Democratic) 37.9%; ▌Lee M. Schaal (Social-Democratic) 0.1%
Wisconsin 9	Merlin Hull	Republican	1934	Incumbent re-elected.	▌ ✓ Merlin Hull (Republican) 70.8%; ▌Arthur L. Henning (Democratic) 29.2%
Wisconsin 10	Alvin O'Konski	Republican	1942	Incumbent re-elected.	▌ ✓ Alvin O'Konski (Republican) 57.0%; ▌Rodney J. Edwards (Democratic) 43.0%

== Wyoming ==
District	Incumbent	Party	First elected	Result	Candidates
Wyoming at-large	Frank A. Barrett	Republican	1942	Incumbent retired to run for Governor of Wyoming. Republican hold.	▌ ✓ William Henry Harrison III (Republican) 54.5%; ▌John B. Clark (Democratic) 45.5%

== Non-voting delegates ==
=== Alaska Territory ===
District	Incumbent			This race	
District	Representative	Party	First elected	Results	Candidates
Alaska Territory at-large	Bob Bartlett	Democratic	1944	Incumbent re-elected.	▌ ✓ Bob Bartlett (Democratic) 72.56%; ▌Almer J. Peterson (Republican) 27.44%

=== Hawaii Territory ===
District	Incumbent			This race	
District	Member	Party	First elected	Results	Candidates
Hawaii Territory at-large	Joseph Rider Farrington	Republican	1942	Incumbent re-elected.	▌ ✓ Joseph Rider Farrington (Republican) 63.70%; ▌William B. Cobb (Democratic) 36.30%

== See also ==
- 1950 United States elections
  - 1950 United States Senate elections
- 81st United States Congress
- 82nd United States Congress
