= J. Mitchell Chase =

American politician

James Mitchell Chase
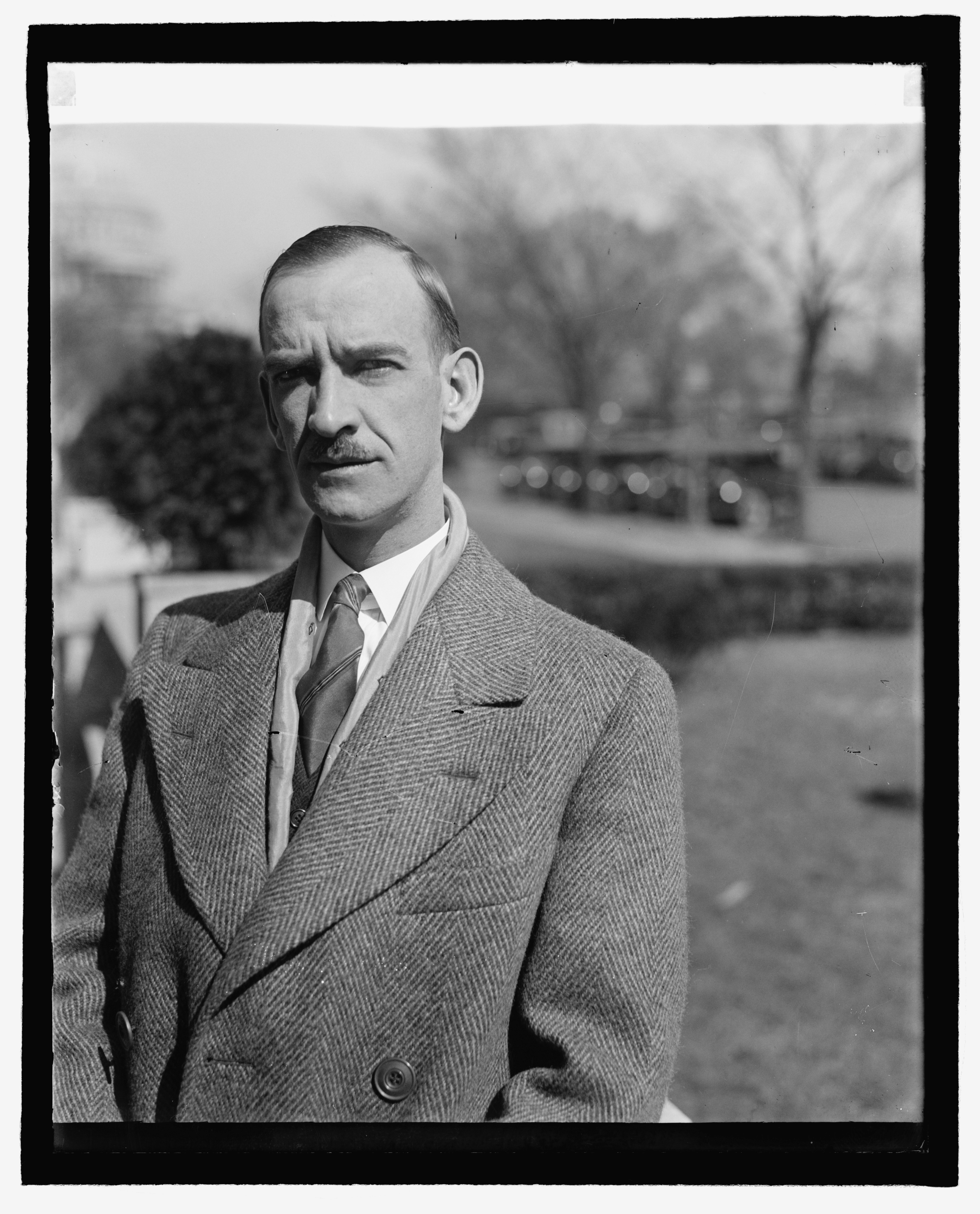

Member of the U.S. House of Representatives from Pennsylvania's 23rd district
- In office March 4, 1927 – March 3, 1933
- Preceded by: William I. Swoope
- Succeeded by: J. Banks Kurtz

Personal details
- Born: December 19, 1891 Glen Richey, Pennsylvania
- Died: January 1, 1945 (aged 53)
- Party: Republican

James Mitchell Chase (December 19, 1891 – January 1, 1945) was a Republican member of the U.S. House of Representatives from Pennsylvania.

== Biography ==
J. Mitchell Chase was born in Glen Richey, Pennsylvania. He graduated from the Dickinson School of Law in Carlisle, Pennsylvania, in 1916. He was admitted to the bar in 1919 and commenced practice in Clearfield, Pennsylvania. During the First World War, he enlisted in the Air Service and served with the American Expeditionary Forces from 1917 to 1919. He served as commander of the American Legion, Department of Pennsylvania, in 1924 and 1925.

Chase was elected as a Republican to the Seventieth, Seventy-first, and Seventy-second Congresses. He was an unsuccessful candidate for renomination in 1932. He resumed the practice of law and died in Clearfield. Interment in Hillcrest Cemetery.

U.S. House of Representatives
Preceded by William I. Swoope	Member of the U.S. House of Representatives from Pennsylvania's 23rd congressional district 1927–1933	Succeeded by J. Banks Kurtz
