= J. Buell Snyder =

American politician (1877–1946)

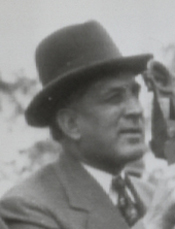
J. Buell Snyder

John Buell Snyder (July 30, 1877 – February 24, 1946) was a Democratic Party member of the U.S. House of Representatives from Pennsylvania.

== Formative years ==
J. Buell Snyder was born on a farm in Upper Turkeyfoot Township, Pennsylvania on July 30, 1877. He attended summer sessions of Harvard University, and Columbia University in New York City before graduating from the Lock Haven Teachers College in Lock Haven, Pennsylvania.

== Career ==
Snyder worked as principal of schools at Stoystown, Rockwood, and Berlin in Somerset County, Pennsylvania, from 1901 to 1906, and of Perry Township Union High School from 1906 to 1912.

He was the western Pennsylvania manager for an educational publisher from 1912 to 1932, and a member of the board of education of Perry Township in Pennsylvania, from 1922 to 1932. He was legislative representative for Pennsylvania school directors during sessions of the Pennsylvania General Assembly from 1921 to 1923, and a member of the National Commission of One Hundred for Study and Survey of Rural Schools in the United States from 1922 to 1924.

Snyder was elected from the 24th district of Pennsylvania as a Democrat to the Seventy-third and to the six succeeding Congresses. He served from March 4, 1933, until his death.

== Death ==
Snyder died in Pittsburgh at the age of sixty-nine on February 24, 1946.

== See also ==
- List of members of the United States Congress who died in office (1900–1949)

== Sources ==
- United States Congress. "J. Buell Snyder (id: S000668)". Biographical Directory of the United States Congress.
- The Political Graveyard

U.S. House of Representatives
Preceded by Samuel A. Kendall	Member of the U.S. House of Representatives from Pennsylvania's 24th congressional district March 4, 1933 – January 3, 1945	Succeeded by Thomas E. Morgan
Preceded by James E. Van Zandt	Member of the U.S. House of Representatives from Pennsylvania's 23rd congressional district January 3, 1945 – February 24, 1946	Succeeded by Carl H. Hoffman
