= Samuel A. Kendall =

American politician

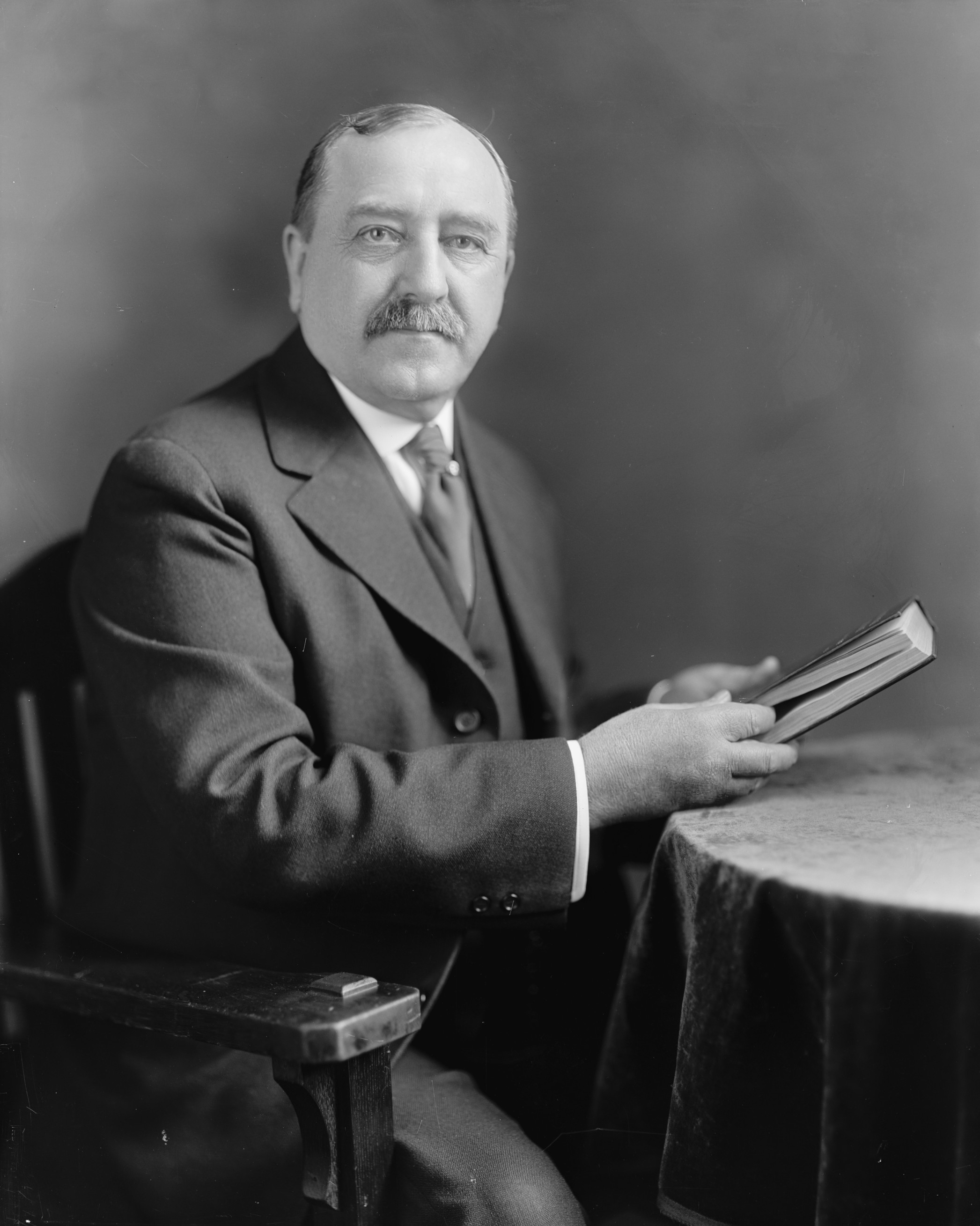

Member of the U.S. House of Representatives from Pennsylvania
- In office March 4, 1919 – January 8, 1933
- Preceded by: Bruce F. Sterling (23rd); Henry W. Temple (24th)
- Succeeded by: William I. Swoope (23rd); J. Buell Snyder (24th)
- Constituency: 23rd district (1919-23); 24th district (1923-33)

Member of the Pennsylvania House of Representatives
- In office 1899–1903

Personal details
- Born: November 1, 1859 Greenville Township, Pennsylvania, U.S.
- Died: January 8, 1933 (aged 73) Washington, D.C., U.S.
- Party: Republican
- Education: Mount Union College

Samuel Austin Kendall (November 1, 1859 – January 8, 1933) was a Republican member of the U.S. House of Representatives from Pennsylvania.

== Biography ==
Samuel A. Kendall was born in Greenville Township, Pennsylvania, in 1859. After attending public school in the Greenville area, he studied at Valparaiso College and Mount Union College. In 1876, he began working as a teacher, eventually serving for five years as public school superintendent Jefferson, Iowa. After leaving teaching in 1890, he returned to Somerset County, Pennsylvania, where he worked in the coal and lumber business. He served as vice president of the Kendall Lumber Co. of Pittsburgh, and president of the Preston Railroad Co. From 1899 to 1903, he served as member of the Pennsylvania State House of Representatives.

In 1919, Kendall was elected as a Republican to the 66th U.S. Congress. He was re-elected to the six succeeding Congresses, serving until his death. While he had lost his bid for reelection in 1932, following the sudden death of his wife that same year, he died of a self-inflicted gunshot wound in the House Office Building in Washington, D.C., in January 1933, before his successor J. Buell Snyder was sworn in. He is interred in Greenville's Hochstetler Cemetery.

== See also ==
- List of members of the United States Congress who died in office (1900–1949)

== Sources ==
- United States Congress. "Samuel A. Kendall (id: K000097)". Biographical Directory of the United States Congress.
- The Political Graveyard

U.S. House of Representatives
Preceded by Bruce F. Sterling	Member of the U.S. House of Representatives from Pennsylvania's 23rd congressional district 1919–1923	Succeeded by William I. Swoope
Preceded by Henry W. Temple	Member of the U.S. House of Representatives from Pennsylvania's 24th congressional district 1923–1933	Succeeded by J. Buell Snyder
