= Anthony Cavalcante =

American politician

Member of the U.S. House of Representatives from Pennsylvania's 23rd district
- In office January 3, 1949 – January 3, 1951
- Preceded by: William J. Crow
- Succeeded by: Edward L. Sittler, Jr.

Member of the Pennsylvania Senate
- In office 1935–1943

Personal details
- Born: February 6, 1897 Vanderbilt, Pennsylvania, U.S.
- Died: October 29, 1966 (aged 69)
- Party: Democratic

Anthony Cavalcante (February 6, 1897 – October 29, 1966) was a United States representative for Pennsylvania.

Anthony Cavalcante was born in Vanderbilt, Pennsylvania. He served overseas with Company D, One Hundred and Tenth Infantry, Twenty-eighth Division, from May 3, 1918, to May 6, 1919, and was awarded the Purple Heart. He was a student at Bucknell University in Lewisburg, Pennsylvania, in 1920 and 1921 and Penn State College in 1921.

He graduated from the law school of Dickinson College in Carlisle, Pennsylvania, in 1924. He was a member of the Pennsylvania State Senate from 1935 to 1943. He worked as chief counsel for United Mine Workers of America, District Four of German Township School District, German Township Road Supervisors, and South Union Township Road Supervisors.

Cavalcante was elected as a Democrat to the 81st Congress in 1948, defeating incumbent Republican Congressman William J. Crow. He was an unsuccessful candidate for reelection in 1950, defeated by Republican Edward L. Sittler. After his time in Congress he was engaged in the practice of law, and died in Uniontown, Pennsylvania, aged 69.

U.S. House of Representatives
Preceded by William J. Crow	Member of the U.S. House of Representatives from Pennsylvania's 23rd congressional district 1949–1951	Succeeded by Edward L. Sittler, Jr.
