= Edward L. Sittler Jr. =

American politician

Edward Lewis Sittler Jr. (April 21, 1908 – December 26, 1978) was a Republican member of the U.S. House of Representatives from Pennsylvania.

Edward Sittler was born in Greensburg, Pennsylvania, and moved with his parents to Uniontown, Pennsylvania while still an infant.

He graduated from Brown University in 1930. He worked as a salesman for an ice cream company from 1931 to 1937. He was elected to the Uniontown School Board in 1934 and served as president of the board in 1936 and 1937. He became a became field underwriter for Mutual Life Insurance Company of New York in 1937. He enlisted as a private in the United States Army in February 1943 and served in the Ordnance Corps in the European Theatre of World War II until released to the Inactive Reserve as a captain in August 1946. He was mayor of Uniontown from 1948 to 1951.

In 1950, he was elected as a Republican to the 82nd United States Congress in the Pennsylvania 23rd district, defeating incumbent Democratic Congressman Anthony Cavalcante, but was an unsuccessful candidate for reelection in 1952 when re-districting forced him into an election against incumbent Democratic Congressman Thomas E. Morgan in the 26th district. He served as Republican State committeeman for Fayette County, Pennsylvania from 1960 to 1972. He was the minority Fayette County Commissioner from 1968 to 1971.

U.S. House of Representatives
Preceded by Anthony Cavalcante	Member of the U.S. House of Representatives from Pennsylvania's 23rd congressional district 1951–1953	Succeeded by Leon H. Gavin
