= Pennsylvania's 23rd congressional district =

Former U.S. House district in Pennsylvania

Coordinates: 41°50′N 79°05′W

- Obsolete district
- Created: 1830
- Eliminated: 1990
- Years active: 1833-1993

Pennsylvania's 23rd congressional district was one of Pennsylvania's districts of the United States House of Representatives.

== History ==
This district was created in 1833. The district was eliminated in 1993.

== List of members representing the district ==
Representative	Party	Years	Congress	Electoral history
District established March 4, 1833
Samuel S. Harrison (Kittanning)	Jacksonian	March 4, 1833 – March 3, 1837	23rd 24th	Elected in 1832. Re-elected in 1834. [data missing]
William Beatty (Butler)	Democratic	March 4, 1837 – March 3, 1841	25th 26th	Elected in 1836. Re-elected in 1838. [data missing]
William Jack (Brookville)	Democratic	March 4, 1841 – March 3, 1843	27th	Elected in 1840. [data missing]
Charles M. Reed (Erie)	Whig	March 4, 1843 – March 3, 1845	28th	Elected in 1843. Lost re-election.
James Thompson (Erie)	Democratic	March 4, 1845 – March 3, 1851	29th 30th 31st	Elected in 1844. Re-elected in 1846. Re-elected in 1848. Retired.
Carlton B. Curtis (Warren)	Democratic	March 4, 1851 – March 3, 1853	32nd	Elected in 1850. Redistricted to the 24th district.
Michael Carver Trout (Sharon)	Democratic	March 4, 1853 – March 3, 1855	33rd	Elected in 1852. Lost re-election.
John Allison (New Brighton)	Opposition	March 4, 1855 – March 3, 1857	34th	Elected in 1854. Retired from the House in 1856.
William Stewart (Mercer)	Republican	March 4, 1857 – March 3, 1861	35th 36th	Elected in 1856. Re-elected in 1858. [data missing]
John W. Wallace (New Castle)	Republican	March 4, 1861 – March 3, 1863	37th	Elected in 1860. Lost re-election.
Thomas Williams (Allegheny City)	Republican	March 4, 1863 – March 3, 1869	38th 39th 40th	Elected in 1862. Re-elected in 1864. Re-elected in 1866. [data missing]
Darwin Phelps (Kittanning)	Republican	March 4, 1869 – March 3, 1871	41st	Elected in 1868. Not candidate for renomination in 1870
Ebenezer McJunkin (Butler)	Republican	March 4, 1871 – 1874	42nd 43rd	Elected in 1870. Re-elected in 1872. Resigned to become presiding judge of the 17th Judicial Circuit of Pennsylvania
John M. Thompson (Butler)	Republican	December 22, 1874 – March 3, 1875	43rd	Elected to finish McJunkin's term. [data missing]
Alexander G. Cochran (Allegheny City)	Democratic	March 4, 1875 – March 3, 1877	44th	Elected in 1874. Lost re-election.
Thomas M. Bayne (Allegheny City)	Republican	March 4, 1877 – March 3, 1891	45th 46th 47th 48th 49th 50th 51st	Elected in 1876. Re-elected in 1878. Re-elected in 1880. Re-elected in 1882. Re-elected in 1884. Re-elected in 1886. Re-elected in 1888. Declined nomination in 1890
William A. Stone (Allegheny City)	Republican	March 4, 1891 – November 9, 1898	52nd 53rd 54th 55th	Elected in 1890. Re-elected in 1892. Re-elected in 1894. Re-elected in 1896. Resigned to become Governor of Pennsylvania.
Vacant		November 9, 1898 – November 29, 1898	55th	
William H. Graham (Allegheny City)	Republican	November 29, 1898 – March 3, 1903	55th 56th 57th	Elected to finish Stone's term. Re-elected in 1898. Re-elected in 1900. Lost re-election.
Allen F. Cooper (Uniontown)	Republican	March 4, 1903 – March 3, 1911	58th 59th 60th 61st	Elected in 1902. Re-elected in 1904. Re-elected in 1906. Re-elected in 1908. [data missing]
Thomas S. Crago (Waynesburg)	Republican	March 4, 1911 – March 3, 1913	62nd	Elected in 1910. Lost re-election.
Wooda N. Carr (Uniontown)	Democratic	March 4, 1913 – March 3, 1915	63rd	Elected in 1912. Lost re-election.
Robert F. Hopwood (Uniontown)	Republican	March 4, 1915 – March 3, 1917	64th	Elected in 1914. Lost re-election.
Bruce F. Sterling (Uniontown)	Democratic	March 4, 1917 – March 3, 1919	65th	Elected in 1916. Lost re-election.
Samuel A. Kendall (Meyersdale)	Republican	March 4, 1919 – March 3, 1923	66th 67th	Elected in 1918. Re-elected in 1920. Redistricted to the 24th district.
William I. Swoope (Clearfield)	Republican	March 4, 1923 – March 3, 1927	68th 69th	Elected in 1922. Re-elected in 1924. Retired.
J. Mitchell Chase (Clearfield)	Republican	March 4, 1927 – March 3, 1933	70th 71st 72nd	Elected in 1926. Re-elected in 1928. Re-elected in 1930. Retired.
J. Banks Kurtz (Altoona)	Republican	March 4, 1933 – January 3, 1935	73rd	Redistricted from the 21st district and re-elected in 1932. Lost re-election.
Don Gingery (Clearfield)	Democratic	January 3, 1935 – January 3, 1939	74th 75th	Elected in 1934. Re-elected in 1936. Lost re-election.
James E. Van Zandt (Altoona)	Republican	January 3, 1939 – September 24, 1943	76th 77th 78th	Elected in 1938. Re-elected in 1940. Re-elected in 1942. Resigned to rejoin the United States Navy.
Vacant		September 24, 1943 – November 2, 1943	78th	
D. Emmert Brumbaugh (Claysburg)	Republican	November 2, 1943 – January 3, 1945	78th	Elected to finish Van Zandt's term. Redistricted to the 22nd district.
J. Buell Snyder (Perryopolis)	Democratic	January 3, 1945 – February 24, 1946	79th	Redistricted from the 24th district and re-elected in 1944. Died.
Vacant		February 24, 1946 – May 21, 1946	79th	
Carl H. Hoffman (Somerset)	Republican	May 21, 1946 – January 3, 1947	79th	Elected to finish Snyder's term. Retired.
William J. Crow (Uniontown)	Republican	January 3, 1947 – January 3, 1949	80th	Elected in 1946. Lost re-election.
Anthony Cavalcante (Uniontown)	Democratic	January 3, 1949 – January 3, 1951	81st	Elected in 1948. Lost re-election.
Edward L. Sittler Jr. (Uniontown)	Republican	January 3, 1951 – January 3, 1953	82nd	Elected in 1950. Lost re-election.
Leon H. Gavin (Oil City)	Republican	January 3, 1953 – September 15, 1963	83rd 84th 85th 86th 87th 88th	Redistricted from the 19th district and re-elected in 1952. Re-elected in 1954. Re-elected in 1956. Re-elected in 1958. Re-elected in 1960. Re-elected in 1962. Died.
Vacant		September 15, 1963 – November 5, 1963	88th	
Albert W. Johnson (Smethport)	Republican	November 5, 1963 – January 3, 1977	88th 89th 90th 91st 92nd 93rd 94th	Elected to finish Gavin's term. Re-elected in 1964. Re-elected in 1966. Re-elected in 1968. Re-elected in 1970. Re-elected in 1972. Re-elected in 1974. Lost re-election.
Joseph S. Ammerman (Curwensville)	Democratic	January 3, 1977 – January 3, 1979	95th	Elected in 1976. Lost re-election.
William F. Clinger Jr. (Warren)	Republican	January 3, 1979 – January 3, 1993	96th 97th 98th 99th 100th 101st 102nd	Elected in 1978. Re-elected in 1980. Re-elected in 1982. Re-elected in 1984. Re-elected in 1986. Re-elected in 1988. Re-elected in 1990. Redistricted to the 5th district.
District dissolved January 3, 1993
