= William J. Crow =

American politician

William Josiah Crow

Member of the U.S. House of Representatives from Pennsylvania's 23rd district
- In office January 3, 1947 – January 3, 1949
- Preceded by: Carl H. Hoffman
- Succeeded by: Anthony Cavalcante

Personal details
- Born: January 22, 1902 Uniontown, Pennsylvania, U.S.
- Died: October 13, 1974 (aged 72) Carlisle, Pennsylvania, U.S.
- Party: Republican

William Josiah Crow (January 22, 1902 – October 13, 1974) was a Republican member of the U.S. House of Representatives from Pennsylvania.

William J. Crow was the son of United States Senator William E. Crow. He was born in Uniontown, Pennsylvania. He graduated from the Pennsylvania Military College at Chester, Pennsylvania in 1922 and from Dickinson School of Law in Carlisle, Pennsylvania in 1925. He was a member of the Phi Kappa Psi fraternity. He was assistant district attorney of Fayette County, Pennsylvania, from 1928 to 1932. He was elected mayor of Uniontown in 1938 and reelected in 1940 for a four-year term and served until called into active service from the Reserves as a Major of Ordnance on June 4, 1941. He served forty-one months overseas in the Pacific theater.

Crow was elected as a Republican to the Eightieth Congress, replacing an interim Republican in a seat vacated by death. Crow and his short-term predecessor interrupted a succession of Democrats in the district, who returned by ousting Crow in 1948. His one-term tenure was noteworthy for his activity in veterans legislation and in the debate to reinstitute military conscription.

Crow was recalled to active duty with the Ordnance Corps in 1951 and served as chief of legislative coordination branch until 1956. In January 1957, he became a regional administrator for the Securities and Exchange Commission in Washington, D.C. He moved to Carlisle, Pennsylvania, after retiring in 1964, and served on the Zoning Board and the Parks Commission.

U.S. House of Representatives
Preceded by Carl H. Hoffman	Member of the U.S. House of Representatives from Pennsylvania's 23rd congressional district 1947–1949	Succeeded by Anthony Cavalcante
