= William I. Swoope =

American politician

William Irvin Swoope
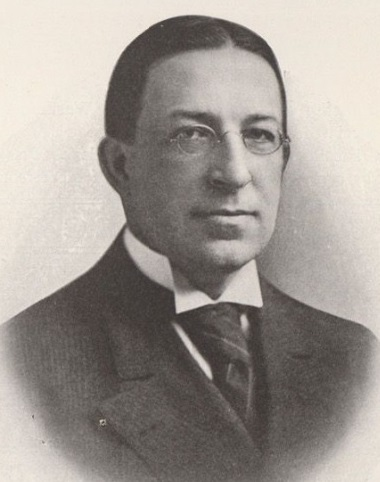
- From a 1914 pamphlet advertising Swoope as a Chautauqua lecturer

Member of the United States House of Representatives
- In office Match 4, 1923 – March 3, 1927
- Preceded by: Samuel A. Kendall
- Succeeded by: J. Mitchell Chase
- Constituency: Pennsylvania's 23rd congressional district

District Attorney of Clearfield County, Pennsylvania
- In office 1901–1907
- Preceded by: Americus H. Woodward.
- Succeeded by: James H. Kelley

Personal details
- Born: October 3, 1862 Clearfield, Pennsylvania, U.S.
- Died: October 9, 1930 (aged 68) Clearfield, Pennsylvania, U.S.
- Resting place: Hillcrest Cemetery, Clearfield, Pennsylvania, U.S.
- Party: Republican
- Spouse: Elizabeth Susan Hartswick (m. 1899)
- Children: 1
- Education: Harvard Law School
- Profession: Attorney

William Irvin Swoope (October 3, 1862 – October 9, 1930) was an attorney and politician from Clearfield, Pennsylvania. A Republican, he served as a member of the United States House of Representatives from 1923 to 1927.

== Early life ==
William I. Swoope was born in Clearfield, Pennsylvania on October 3, 1862, the son of attorney Henry Bucher Swoope and Susanna P. (Irwin) Swoope. He attended The Hill School in Pottstown, PA and Phillips Academy in Andover, Massachusetts, then attended Harvard Law School. He graduated in 1886, then studied law in the Curwensville office of his uncle Roland D. Swoope. He attained admission to the bar later that year, and practiced law in Minnesota, Nebraska, and Bellefonte, Pennsylvania. While living in Bellefonte, he was elected to a term as town burgess.

== Career ==
In 1892, Swoope returned to Clearfield and continued the practice of law. He was elected county Republican committee chairman on two occasions, and served as district attorney for Clearfield County from 1901 to 1907. He was a delegate to the 1916 Republican National Convention. He served as deputy attorney general for Pennsylvania from 1919 to 1923.

== Member of Congress ==
In 1922, Swoope was elected as a Republican to the 68th Congress. He was reelected to the 69th Congress, and served March 4, 1923 to March 3, 1927. During his second term, Swoope served as chairman of the United States House Committee on Invalid Pensions. He declined to run for reelection in 1926.

== Death and burial ==
After leaving Congress, Swoope resumed the practice of law in Clearfield. He died in Clearfield on October 9, 1930. Swoope was buried at Hillcrest Cemetery in Clearfield.

== Family ==
In 1899, Swoope married Elizabeth Susan Hartswick. They were married until his death. The Swoopes were the parents of a daughter, Priscilla.

Swoope was the nephew of U.S. Representative John Patton and the uncle of USS Arizona captain Franklin Van Valkenburgh.

U.S. House of Representatives
Preceded by Samuel A. Kendall	Member of the U.S. House of Representatives from Pennsylvania's 23rd congressional district 1923–1927	Succeeded by J. Mitchell Chase
