= Carl Henry Hoffman =

American politician

Carl H. Hoffman
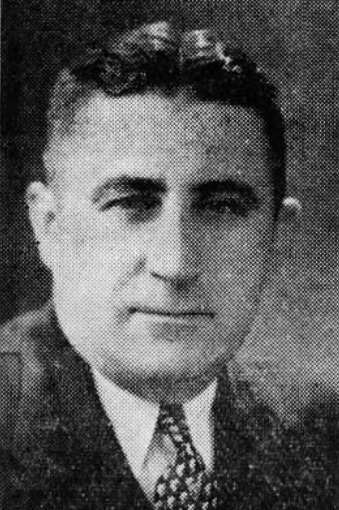
- Meyersdale Republican (Meyersdale, Pennsylvania), April 18, 1940

Member of the U.S. House of Representatives from Pennsylvania's 23rd district
- In office May 21, 1946 – January 3, 1947
- Preceded by: J. Buell Snyder
- Succeeded by: William J. Crow

Personal details
- Born: August 12, 1896 Bangor, Pennsylvania, U.S.
- Died: November 30, 1980 (aged 84) Somerset, Pennsylvania, U.S.
- Party: Republican
- Education: Juniata College

Carl Henry Hoffman (August 12, 1896 – November 30, 1980) was a Republican member of the U.S. House of Representatives from Pennsylvania.

== Biography ==
Carl H. Hoffman graduated from Juniata College in Huntingdon, Pennsylvania, in 1922. He served during the First World War as a candidate in Officers' Training School for Infantry. He taught school and was a coach of athletics at Juniata College in 1922. He was engaged in the lumber, oil, and banking businesses in Somerset, Pennsylvania from 1923 to 1946.

Hoffman was elected as a Republican to the Seventy-ninth Congress to fill the vacancy caused by the death of J. Buell Snyder and served from May 21, 1946, to January 3, 1947. He was not a candidate for renomination in 1946 to the Eightieth Congress. He resumed his former business pursuits at Somerset where he resided until his death in 1980. Interment in Husband Cemetery.

U.S. House of Representatives
| Preceded by J. Buell Snyder | Member of the U.S. House of Representatives from Pennsylvania's 23rd congressional district 1946–1947 | Succeeded by William J. Crow |
