= Bruce F. Sterling =

American politician

Bruce Foster Sterling
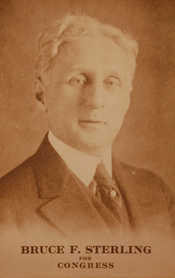
- Bruce Sterling campaign card, 1916–1918

Member of the U.S. House of Representatives from Pennsylvania's 23rd district
- In office March 4, 1917 – March 3, 1919
- Preceded by: Robert F. Hopwood
- Succeeded by: Samuel A. Kendall

Personal details
- Born: September 28, 1870 Masontown, Pennsylvania, U.S.
- Died: April 26, 1945 (aged 74) Uniontown, Pennsylvania, U.S.
- Party: Democratic Party
- Education: California State Normal School; West Virginia University

Bruce Foster Sterling (September 28, 1870 – April 26, 1945) was a Democratic member of the U.S. House of Representatives from Pennsylvania.

== Biography ==
Bruce Foster Sterling was born in Masontown, Pennsylvania. He attended the public schools of Masontown and the California State Normal School in California, Pennsylvania.

He graduated from West Virginia University in Morgantown, West Virginia, in 1895. He studied law, was admitted to the bar in 1896 and commenced practice in Uniontown, Pennsylvania. He served as a member of the Pennsylvania State House of Representatives in 1906 and was a delegate to the Democratic National Conventions in 1912, 1920 and 1924.

Sterling was elected as a Democrat to the Sixty-fifth Congress. He was an unsuccessful candidate for reelection in 1918. He resumed the practice of law. He was elected register of wills and clerk of the orphans court of Fayette County, Pennsylvania, in 1935, 1939, and 1943.

He died at Uniontown, aged 75, and was interred in Oak Grove Cemetery.

== Sources ==
- United States Congress. "Bruce F. Sterling (id: S000869)". Biographical Directory of the United States Congress.
- The Political Graveyard

U.S. House of Representatives
Preceded by Robert F. Hopwood	Member of the U.S. House of Representatives from Pennsylvania's 23rd congressional district March 4, 1917 – March 3, 1919	Succeeded by Samuel A. Kendall
