= Glen Richey, Pennsylvania =

Unincorporated community in Pennsylvania, US

- Unincorporated community
- Location within Pennsylvania
- Coordinates: 40°56′56″N 78°28′40″W
- Country: United States
- State: Pennsylvania
- County: Clearfield
- Elevation: 1,388 ft (423 m)
- Time zone: UTC-5 (Eastern (EST))
  - Summer (DST): UTC-4 (EDT)
- ZIP code: 16837
- Area code: 814
- GNIS feature ID: 1175702

Glen Richey is an unincorporated community in Clearfield County, Pennsylvania, United States. The community is 3.1 miles (5.0 km) southeast of Curwensville. Glen Richey has a post office with ZIP code 16837.

== Demographics ==
Historical population
Census	Pop.	Note	%±

The United States Census Bureau defined Glen Richey as a census designated place (CDP) in 2023.
