= Leon H. Gavin =

American politician

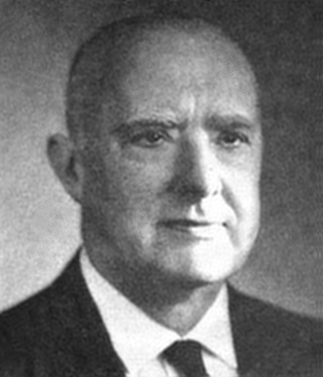

Member of the U.S. House of Representatives from Pennsylvania
- In office January 3, 1943 – September 15, 1963
- Preceded by: Benjamin Jarrett
- Succeeded by: Albert W. Johnson
- Constituency: 20th district (1943–1945); 19th district (1945–1953); 23rd district (1953–1963)

Personal details
- Born: February 25, 1893 Buffalo, New York, U.S.
- Died: September 15, 1963 (aged 70) Washington, D.C., U.S.
- Party: Republican

Leon Harry Gavin (February 25, 1893 – September 15, 1963) was a Republican member of the U.S. House of Representatives from Pennsylvania.

== Biography ==
Leon H. Gavin was born in Buffalo, New York, and moved to Oil City, Pennsylvania, in 1915. During the First World War he served in the United States Army as a sergeant in the Fifty-first Infantry Regiment of the 6th Infantry Division. He served on the Defense Council of Venango County, Pennsylvania. He was a member of the State Board of Appeals of the Selective Service System, the executive secretary of the Oil City Chamber of Commerce, and a member of the National Migratory Bird Conservation Commission from 1958 to 1963.

He was elected as a Republican to the 78th United States Congress and to the ten succeeding Congresses and served from January 3, 1943, until his death from a cerebral hemorrhage in Washington, D.C., on September 15, 1963. He is interred in Arlington National Cemetery. Gavin voted in favor of the Civil Rights Acts of 1957 and 1960, as well as the 24th Amendment to the U.S. Constitution.

== See also ==
- List of members of the United States Congress who died in office (1950–1999)

U.S. House of Representatives
Preceded by Benjamin Jarrett	Member of the U.S. House of Representatives from Pennsylvania's 20th congressional district 1943–1945	Succeeded by Francis E. Walter
Preceded by John C. Kunkel	Member of the U.S. House of Representatives from Pennsylvania's 19th congressional district 1945–1953	Succeeded by S. Walter Stauffer
Preceded by Edward L. Sittler, Jr.	Member of the U.S. House of Representatives from Pennsylvania's 23rd congressional district 1953–1963	Succeeded by Albert W. Johnson
