= Thomas E. Morgan =

American politician

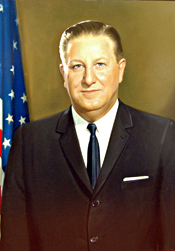

Member of the U.S. House of Representatives from Pennsylvania
- In office January 3, 1945 – January 3, 1977
- Preceded by: J. Buell Snyder
- Succeeded by: Austin Murphy
- Constituency: 24th district (1945–1953); 26th district (1953–1973); 22nd district (1973–1977)

Chair of the House Committee on International Relations
- In office January 3, 1959 – January 3, 1977
- Preceded by: Thomas S. Gordon
- Succeeded by: Clement J. Zablocki

Personal details
- Born: October 13, 1906 Ellsworth, Pennsylvania, U.S.
- Died: July 31, 1995 (aged 88)
- Resting place: Beallsville Cemetery; 40.06906°N 80.02546°W
- Party: Democratic
- Spouse: Winifred Stait
- Education: Waynesburg University; Wayne State University School of Medicine; Wayne State University

Thomas Ellsworth Morgan (October 13, 1906 – July 31, 1995) was a Democratic member of the U.S. House of Representatives from Pennsylvania.

Thomas E. Morgan was born in Ellsworth, Pennsylvania; his mother was an immigrant from England and his father was from Wales. He graduated from Waynesburg College in 1930, the Detroit College of Medicine and Surgery in 1933, and Wayne University in Detroit, Michigan, in 1934. He began the practice of medicine and surgery at Fredericktown, Pennsylvania, in 1935.

He was elected as a Democrat to the 79th and to the fifteen succeeding Congresses (January 3, 1945 – January 3, 1977). He was the Chairman of the United States House Committee on Foreign Affairs (86th through 93rd Congresses), and the United States House Committee on International Relations during the 94th Congress. He was not a candidate for reelection in 1976.

U.S. House of Representatives
Preceded by J. Buell Snyder	Member of the U.S. House of Representatives from Pennsylvania's 24th congressional district 1945–1953	Succeeded by Carroll D. Kearns
Preceded by John P. Saylor	Member of the U.S. House of Representatives from Pennsylvania's 26th congressional district 1953–1973	Succeeded by District Eliminated
Preceded by John P. Saylor	Member of the U.S. House of Representatives from Pennsylvania's 22nd congressional district 1973–1977	Succeeded by Austin J. Murphy
Political offices
Preceded by Thomas S. Gordon; Illinois	Chairman of the United States House Committee on Foreign Affairs; 1959–1977	Succeeded by Clement J. Zablocki; Wisconsin
