= 1948 United States House of Representatives elections =

House elections for the 81st U.S. Congress

- November 2, 1948

All 435 seats in the United States House of Representatives 218 seats needed for a majority
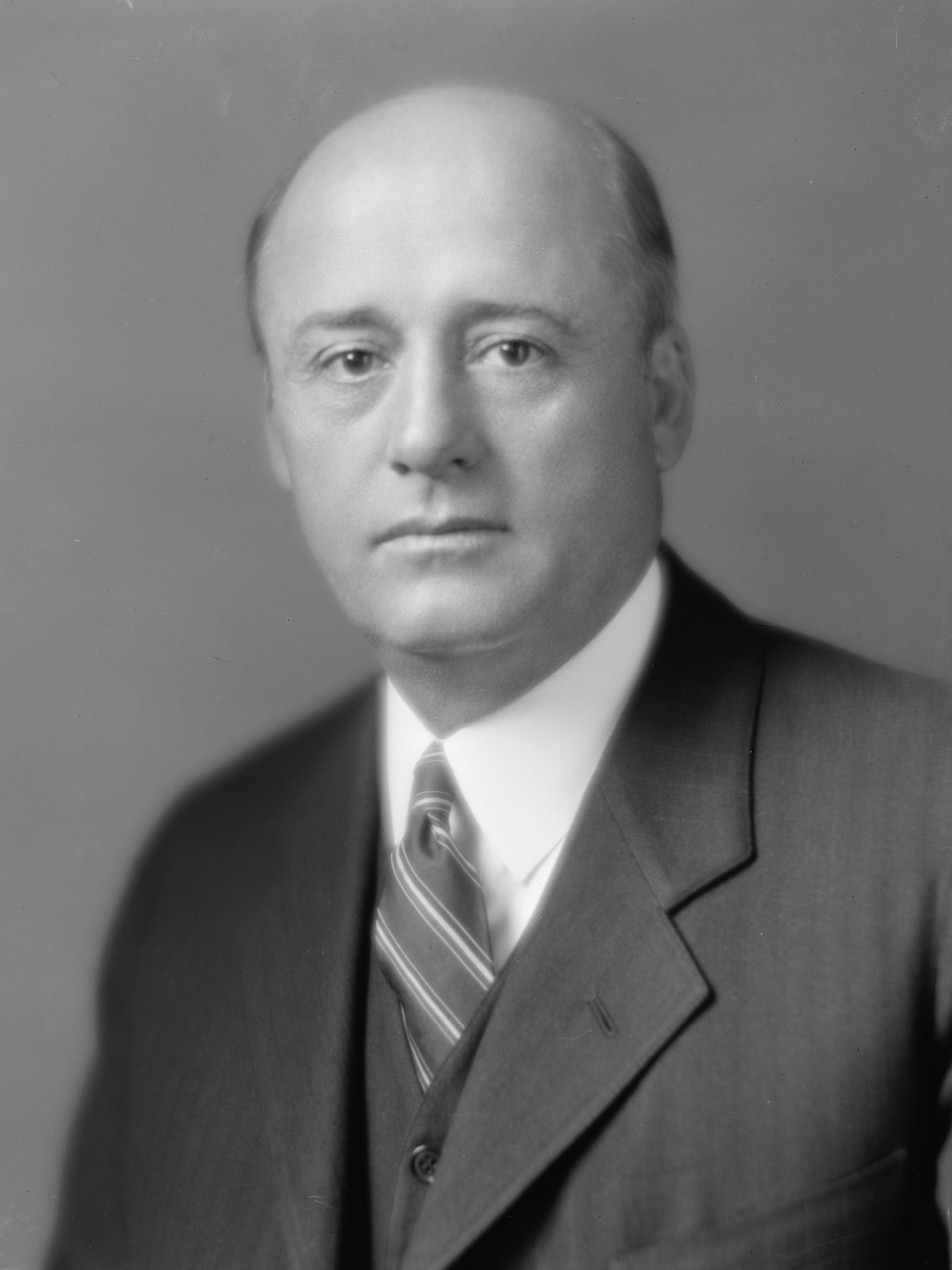

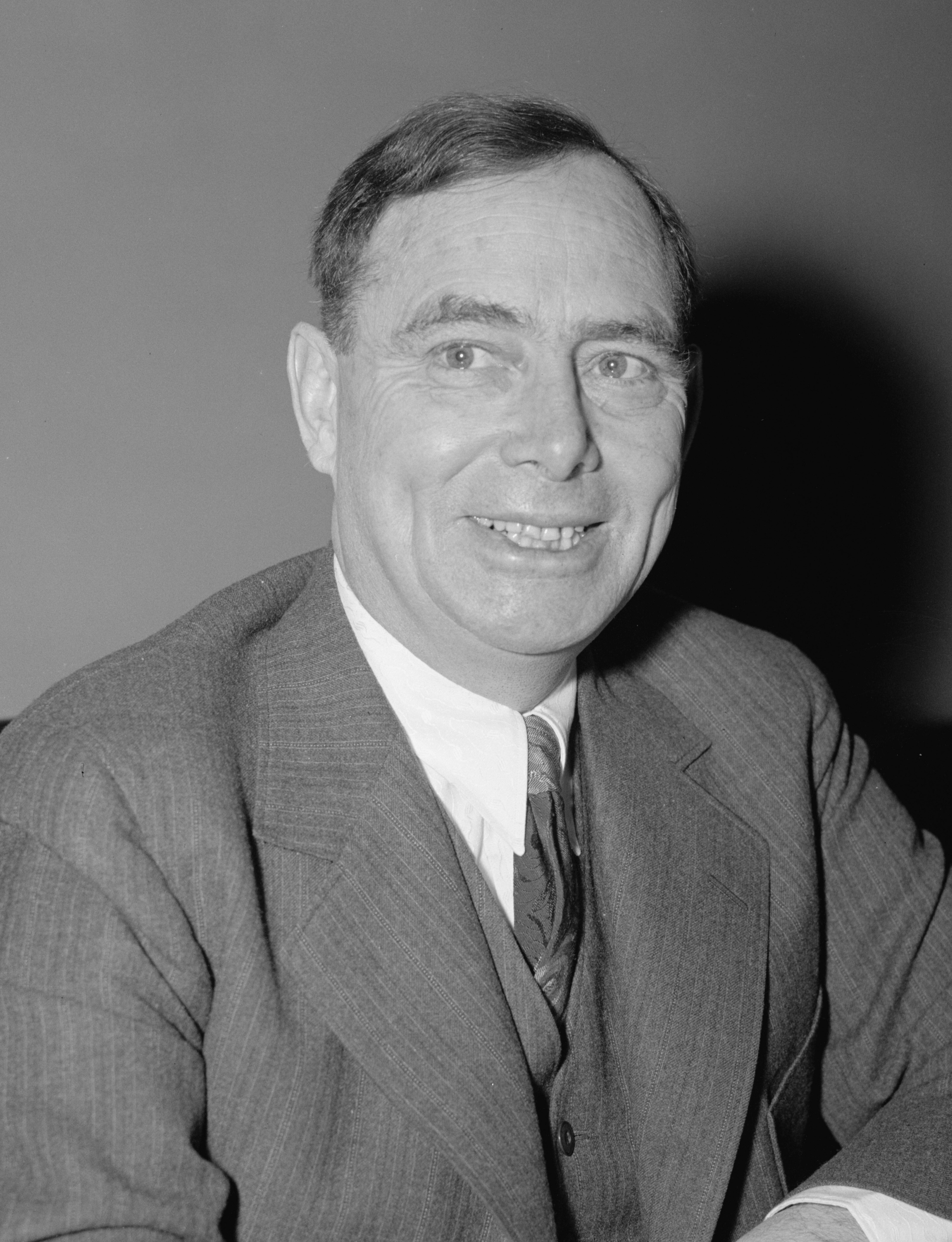
| | Majority party | Minority party |
|---|---|---|
| Leader | Sam Rayburn | Joseph Martin |
| Party | Democratic | Republican |
| Leader since | September 16, 1940 | January 3, 1939 |
| Leader's seat | Texas 4th | Massachusetts 14th |
| Last election | 188 seats | 246 seats |
| Seats won | 263 | 171 |
| Seat change | ▲75 | ▼75 |
| Popular vote | 24,217,516 | 20,894,960 |
| Percentage | 52.6% | 45.4% |
| Swing | ▲7.6pp | ▼8.1pp |
| | Third party |
| Party | American Labor |
| Last election | 1 seat |
| Seats won | 1 |
| Seat change | Steady |
| Popular vote | 409,789 |
| Percentage | 0.9% |
| Swing | ▲0.3pp |
Speaker before election
Joseph Martin
Republican
Elected Speaker
Sam Rayburn
Democratic

The 1948 United States House of Representatives elections were elections for the United States House of Representatives to elect members to serve in the 81st United States Congress. They were held for the most part on November 2, 1948, while Maine held theirs on September 13. These elections coincided with President Harry S. Truman's election to a full term. Truman had campaigned against a "do-nothing"' Republican Party Congress that had opposed his initiatives and was seen as counterproductive. The Democratic Party regained control of both the House and Senate in this election. For Democrats, this was their largest gain since 1932.

These were the last elections until 1980 when a member of a political party other than the Democrats, Republicans, or an independent had one or more seats in the chamber. To date, this is the last time the Democrats gained more than 50 seats in a U.S. House election.

== Overall results ==
↓
| 263 | 1 | 171 |
| Democratic | (Note: The American Labor party had 1 seat.) | Republican |

| Party | Total seats | Change | Seat percentage | Vote percentage | Popular vote |
|---|---|---|---|---|---|
| Democratic Party | 263 | ▲75 | 60.5% | 52.6% | 24,217,516 |
| Republican Party | 171 | ▼75 | 39.3% | 45.4% | 20,894,960 |
| American Labor Party | 1 | Steady | 0.2% | 0.9% | 409,789 |
| Progressive Party | 0 | Steady | 0.0% | 0.8% | 362,514 |
| Prohibition Party | 0 | Steady | 0.0% | 0.1% | 32,648 |
| Independent | 0 | Steady | 0.0% | 0.1% | 29,419 |
| Liberal Party | 0 | Steady | 0.0% | 0.1% | 27,394 |
| Socialist Party | 0 | Steady | 0.0% | <0.1% | 20,473 |
| Socialist Workers Party | 0 | Steady | 0.0% | <0.1% | 2,496 |
| Communist Party | 0 | Steady | 0.0% | <0.1% | 775 |
| Socialist Labor Party | 0 | Steady | 0.0% | <0.1% | 48 |
| Others | 0 | Steady | 0.0% | <0.1% | 12,593 |
| Totals | 435 | Steady | 100.0% | 100.0% | 46,010,625 |

Popular vote
| American Labor | 0.89% |
| Democratic | 52.63% |
| Republican | 45.41% |
| Others | 1.07% |

House seats
| American Labor | 0.23% |
| Democratic | 60.46% |
| Republican | 39.31% |

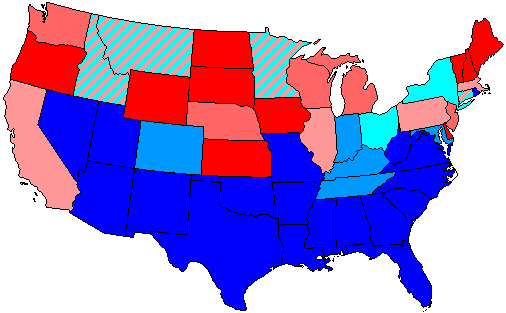
House seats by party holding plurality in state: 80+% Democratic / 80+% Republican; 60+% to 80% Democratic / 60+% to 80% Republican; Up to 60% Democratic / Up to 60% Republican

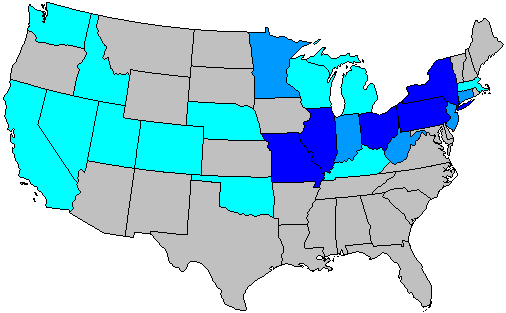
6+ Democratic net gain 3-5 Democratic net gain 1-2 Democratic net gain no net change

== Special elections ==
Sorted by election date, then by district.

| District | Vacated by | | | Reason for Vacancy | Candidates |
| District | Representative | Party | First elected | Reason for Vacancy | Candidates |
|---|---|---|---|---|---|
| New York 24 | Benjamin J. Rabin | Democratic | 1944 | Incumbent resigned December 31, 1947 to become a New York Supreme Court justice. New member elected February 17, 1948. American Labor gain. Winner later lost re-election; see below. | ▌ ✓ Leo Isacson (American Labor) 55.88%; ▌Karl Propper (Democratic) 31.01%; ▌Dean Alfange (Liberal) 9.46%; ▌Joseph DeNigris (Republican) 3.65% |
| Virginia 4 | Patrick H. Drewry | Democratic | 1920 (special) | Incumbent died December 21, 1947. New member elected February 17, 1948. Democratic hold. Winner later re-elected to the next term; see below. | ▌ ✓ Watkins Abbitt (Democratic) 49.03%; ▌Morton G. Goode (Democratic) 39.11%; ▌Robert W. Arnold (Democratic) 8.76%; ▌T. Robert Cocks (Republican) 3.10% |
| Kentucky 2 | Earle Clements | Democratic | 1944 | Incumbent resigned January 6, 1948 to become Governor of Kentucky. New member elected April 17, 1948. Democratic hold. Winner later re-elected to the next term; see below. | ▌ ✓ John Whitaker (Democratic) 97.73%; Scattering 2.27% |
| Kentucky 9 | John Robsion | Republican | 1918 | Incumbent died February 17, 1948. New member elected April 24, 1948. Republican hold. Winner later re-elected to the next term; see below. | ▌ ✓ William Lewis (Republican) 96.18%; Scattering 3.82% |
| Missouri 10 | Orville Zimmerman | Democratic | 1934 | Incumbent died April 7, 1948. New member elected November 2, 1948. Democratic hold. Winner also elected to the next term; see below. | ▌ ✓ Paul C. Jones (Democratic) 71.40%; ▌W. K. Dillon (Republican) 28.60% |
| Virginia 6 | J. Lindsay Almond | Democratic | 1946 (special) | Incumbent resigned April 17, 1948 to become Attorney General of Virginia. New member elected November 2, 1948. Democratic hold. Winner also elected to the next term; see below. | ▌ ✓ Clarence G. Burton (Democratic) 65.24%; ▌John Strickler (Republican) 34.76% |
| Texas 15 | Milton H. West | Democratic | 1933 (special) | Incumbent announced retirement but then died October 28, 1948. New member elected December 4, 1948. Democratic hold. Winner had already been elected to the next term; see below. | ▌ ✓ Lloyd Bentsen (Democratic); Uncontested |

== Alabama ==
| District | Incumbent | Party | First elected | Result | Candidates |
|---|---|---|---|---|---|
| Alabama 1 | Frank W. Boykin | Democratic | 1935 (special) | Incumbent re-elected. | ▌ ✓ Frank W. Boykin (Democratic); Uncontested |
| Alabama 2 | George M. Grant | Democratic | 1938 | Incumbent re-elected. | ▌ ✓ George M. Grant (Democratic); Uncontested |
| Alabama 3 | George W. Andrews | Democratic | 1944 | Incumbent re-elected. | ▌ ✓ George W. Andrews (Democratic); Uncontested |
| Alabama 4 | Sam Hobbs | Democratic | 1934 | Incumbent re-elected. | ▌ ✓ Sam Hobbs (Democratic) 85.0%; ▌H. Hogan Stewart (Republican) 15.0% |
| Alabama 5 | Albert Rains | Democratic | 1944 | Incumbent re-elected. | ▌ ✓ Albert Rains (Democratic); Uncontested |
| Alabama 6 | Pete Jarman | Democratic | 1936 | Incumbent lost renomination. Democratic hold. | ▌ ✓ Edward deGraffenried (Democratic) 82.3%; ▌William P. Ivey (Republican) 17.7% |
| Alabama 7 | Carter Manasco | Democratic | 1941 (special) | Incumbent lost renomination. Democratic hold. | ▌ ✓ Carl Elliott (Democratic); Uncontested |
| Alabama 8 | Robert E. Jones Jr. | Democratic | 1947 (special) | Incumbent re-elected. | ▌ ✓ Robert E. Jones Jr. (Democratic) 88.4%; ▌Harry J. Frahn (Republican) 11.6% |
| Alabama 9 | Laurie C. Battle | Democratic | 1946 | Incumbent re-elected. | ▌ ✓ Laurie C. Battle (Democratic) 87.1%; ▌Hiram Dodd (Republican) 12.9% |

== Arizona ==
| District | Incumbent | Party | First elected | Result | Candidates |
|---|---|---|---|---|---|
| Arizona 1 | John R. Murdock; Redistricted from the at-large district | Democratic | 1936 | Incumbent re-elected. | ▌ ✓ John R. Murdock (Democratic) 58.4%; ▌John Hunt Udall (Republican) 41.0%; ▌A. E. Templin (Prohibition) 0.7% |
| Arizona 2 | Richard F. Harless; Redistricted from the at-large district | Democratic | 1942 | Incumbent retired to run for Governor of Arizona. Democratic hold. | ▌ ✓ Harold Patten (Democratic) 62.8%; ▌Albert R. Buehman (Republican) 35.0%; Others: ▌John P. Foley (Progressive) 1.7%; ▌T. C. Abbott (Prohibition) 0.4% |

== Arkansas ==
| District | Incumbent | Party | First elected | Result | Candidates |
|---|---|---|---|---|---|
| Arkansas 1 | Ezekiel C. Gathings | Democratic | 1938 | Incumbent re-elected. | ▌ ✓ Ezekiel C. Gathings (Democratic); Uncontested |
| Arkansas 2 | Wilbur Mills | Democratic | 1938 | Incumbent re-elected. | ▌ ✓ Wilbur Mills (Democratic); Uncontested |
| Arkansas 3 | James William Trimble | Democratic | 1944 | Incumbent re-elected. | ▌ ✓ James William Trimble (Democratic); Uncontested |
| Arkansas 4 | William Fadjo Cravens | Democratic | 1939 (special) | Incumbent retired. Democratic hold. | ▌ ✓ Boyd Anderson Tackett (Democratic); Uncontested |
| Arkansas 5 | Brooks Hays | Democratic | 1942 | Incumbent re-elected. | ▌ ✓ Brooks Hays (Democratic); Uncontested |
| Arkansas 6 | William F. Norrell | Democratic | 1938 | Incumbent re-elected. | ▌ ✓ William F. Norrell (Democratic); Uncontested |
| Arkansas 7 | Oren Harris | Democratic | 1940 | Incumbent re-elected. | ▌ ✓ Oren Harris (Democratic); Uncontested |

== California ==
| District | Incumbent | Party | First elected | Result | Candidates |
|---|---|---|---|---|---|
| California 1 | Clarence F. Lea | Democratic | 1916 | Incumbent retired. Republican gain. | ▌ ✓ Hubert B. Scudder (Republican) 54.5%; ▌Sterling J. Norgard (Democratic) 45.3%; ▌Roger Kent (Write-in) 0.2% |
| California 2 | Clair Engle | Democratic | 1943 (special) | Incumbent re-elected. | ▌ ✓ Clair Engle (Democratic); Uncontested |
| California 3 | J. Leroy Johnson | Republican | 1942 | Incumbent re-elected. | ▌ ✓ J. Leroy Johnson (Republican) 84.4%; ▌James B. Willard (Ind. Progressive) 15.6% |
| California 4 | Franck R. Havenner | Democratic | 1944 | Incumbent re-elected. | ▌ ✓ Franck R. Havenner (Democratic) 51.0%; ▌William S. Mailliard (Republican) 47.7%; ▌Francis J. McTernan Jr. (Ind. Progressive) 1.3% |
| California 5 | Richard J. Welch | Republican | 1926 | Incumbent re-elected. | ▌ ✓ Richard J. Welch (Republican); Uncontested |
| California 6 | George P. Miller | Democratic | 1944 | Incumbent re-elected. | ▌ ✓ George P. Miller (Democratic); Uncontested |
| California 7 | John J. Allen Jr. | Republican | 1946 | Incumbent re-elected. | ▌ ✓ John J. Allen Jr. (Republican) 51.4%; ▌Buell G. Gallagher (Democratic) 48.6% |
| California 8 | Jack Z. Anderson | Republican | 1938 | Incumbent re-elected. | ▌ ✓ Jack Z. Anderson (Republican) 79.9%; ▌Paul Taylor (Ind. Progressive) 20.1% |
| California 9 | Bertrand W. Gearhart | Republican | 1934 | Incumbent lost re-election. Democratic gain. | ▌ ✓ Cecil F. White (Democratic) 51.3%; ▌Bertrand W. Gearhart (Republican) 46.9%; ▌Josephine F. Daniels (Ind. Progressive) 1.8% |
| California 10 | Alfred J. Elliott | Democratic | 1937 (special) | Incumbent retired. Republican gain. | ▌ ✓ Thomas H. Werdel (Republican) 71.3%; ▌Sam James Miller (Ind. Progressive) 28.7% |
| California 11 | Ernest K. Bramblett | Republican | 1946 | Incumbent re-elected. | ▌ ✓ Ernest K. Bramblett (Republican) 80.8%; ▌Cole Weston (Ind. Progressive) 13.5%; ▌George E. Outland (Write-in) 5.7% |
| California 12 | Richard Nixon | Republican | 1946 | Incumbent re-elected. | ▌ ✓ Richard Nixon (Republican) 87.8%; ▌Una W. Rice (Ind. Progressive) 12.2% |
| California 13 | Norris Poulson | Republican | 1946 | Incumbent re-elected. | ▌ ✓ Norris Poulson (Republican) 52.6%; ▌Ned R. Healy (Democratic) 47.4% |
| California 14 | Helen Gahagan Douglas | Democratic | 1944 | Incumbent re-elected. | ▌ ✓ Helen Gahagan Douglas (Democratic) 65.3%; ▌W. Wallace Braden (Republican) 32.5%; ▌Sidney Moore (Ind. Progressive) 2.1% |
| California 15 | Gordon L. McDonough | Republican | 1944 | Incumbent re-elected. | ▌ ✓ Gordon L. McDonough (Republican) 83.0%; ▌Maynard J. Omerberg (Ind. Progressive) 17.0% |
| California 16 | Donald L. Jackson | Republican | 1946 | Incumbent re-elected. | ▌ ✓ Donald L. Jackson (Republican) 57.0%; ▌Ellis E. Patterson (Democratic) 43.0% |
| California 17 | Cecil R. King | Democratic | 1942 | Incumbent re-elected. | ▌ ✓ Cecil R. King (Democratic); Uncontested |
| California 18 | Willis W. Bradley | Republican | 1946 | Incumbent lost re-election. Democratic gain. | ▌ ✓ Clyde Doyle (Democratic) 51.1%; ▌Willis W. Bradley (Republican) 44.9%; ▌Stanley Moffatt (Ind. Progressive) 4.0% |
| California 19 | Chet Holifield | Democratic | 1942 | Incumbent re-elected. | ▌ ✓ Chet Holifield (Democratic) 69.7%; ▌Joseph Francis Quigley (Republican) 27.5%; ▌Jacob Berman (Ind. Progressive) 1.8%; ▌Myra Tanner Weiss (Independent) 1.0% |
| California 20 | John Carl Hinshaw | Republican | 1938 | Incumbent re-elected. | ▌ ✓ John Carl Hinshaw (Republican) 81.6%; ▌William B. Esterman (Ind. Progressive) 18.4% |
| California 21 | Harry R. Sheppard | Democratic | 1936 | Incumbent re-elected. | ▌ ✓ Harry R. Sheppard (Democratic) 55.2%; ▌Lowell E. Lathrop (Republican) 42.6%; ▌Howard G. Louks (Ind. Progressive) 2.2% |
| California 22 | John Phillips | Republican | 1942 | Incumbent re-elected. | ▌ ✓ John Phillips (Republican); Uncontested |
| California 23 | Charles K. Fletcher | Republican | 1946 | Incumbent lost re-election. Democratic gain. | ▌ ✓ Clinton D. McKinnon (Democratic) 55.8%; ▌Charles K. Fletcher (Republican) 43.2%; ▌Harry C. Steinmetz (Ind. Progressive) 1.0% |

== Colorado ==
| District | Incumbent | Party | First elected | Result | Candidates |
|---|---|---|---|---|---|
| Colorado 1 | John A. Carroll | Democratic | 1946 | Incumbent re-elected. | ▌ ✓ John A. Carroll (Democratic) 64.8%; ▌Christopher F. Cusack (Republican) 35.2% |
| Colorado 2 | William S. Hill | Republican | 1940 | Incumbent re-elected. | ▌ ✓ William S. Hill (Republican) 51.9%; ▌George L. Bickel (Democratic) 48.1% |
| Colorado 3 | John Chenoweth | Republican | 1940 | Incumbent lost re-election. Democratic gain. | ▌ ✓ John H. Marsalis (Democratic) 50.7%; ▌John Chenoweth (Republican) 49.3% |
| Colorado 4 | Robert F. Rockwell | Republican | 1941 (special) | Incumbent lost re-election. Democratic gain. | ▌ ✓ Wayne N. Aspinall (Democratic) 51.9%; ▌Robert F. Rockwell (Republican) 48.1% |

== Connecticut ==
| District | Incumbent | Party | First elected | Result | Candidates |
|---|---|---|---|---|---|
| Connecticut 1 | William J. Miller | Republican | 1946 | Incumbent lost re-election. Democratic gain. | ▌ ✓ Abraham Ribicoff (Democratic) 54.7%; ▌William J. Miller (Republican) 44.2%; ▌Harold Conroy (People's) 1.1% |
| Connecticut 2 | Horace Seely-Brown Jr. | Republican | 1946 | Incumbent lost re-election. Democratic gain. | ▌ ✓ Chase G. Woodhouse (Democratic) 51.6%; ▌Horace Seely-Brown Jr. (Republican) 48.4% |
| Connecticut 3 | Ellsworth Foote | Republican | 1946 | Incumbent lost re-election. Democratic gain. | ▌ ✓ John A. McGuire (Democratic) 49.7%; ▌Ellsworth Foote (Republican) 49.0%; ▌John Marsalka (People's) 1.3% |
| Connecticut 4 | John Davis Lodge | Republican | 1946 | Incumbent re-elected. | ▌ ✓ John Davis Lodge (Republican) 55.2%; ▌William Gaston (Democratic) 43.4%; ▌Stanley W. Mayhew (Socialist) 1.5% |
| Connecticut 5 | James T. Patterson | Republican | 1946 | Incumbent re-elected. | ▌ ✓ James T. Patterson (Republican) 51.1%; ▌Vincent P. Kiernan (Democratic) 47.4%; Others: ▌Charles E. Didsbury (People's) 1.0%; ▌William A. Sherman (Socialist) 0.5% |
| Connecticut at-large | Antoni Sadlak | Republican | 1946 | Incumbent re-elected. | ▌ ✓ Antoni Sadlak (Republican) 49.3%; ▌Fred Trotta (Democratic) 48.8%; Others: ▌Nicholas Tomassetti (People's) 1.2%; ▌Ralph M. Waterman (Socialist) 0.7% |

== Delaware ==
| District | Incumbent | Party | First elected | Result | Candidates |
|---|---|---|---|---|---|
| Delaware at-large | J. Caleb Boggs | Republican | 1946 | Incumbent re-elected. | ▌ ✓ J. Caleb Boggs (Republican) 50.6%; ▌J. Carl McGuigan (Democratic) 49.0%; Others: ▌Edward C. Graham (Prohibition) 0.3%; ▌Le Roy B. Jones (Socialist) 0.07% |

== Florida ==
| District | Incumbent | Party | First elected | Result | Candidates |
|---|---|---|---|---|---|
| Florida 1 | J. Hardin Peterson | Democratic | 1932 | Incumbent re-elected. | ▌ ✓ J. Hardin Peterson (Democratic); Uncontested |
| Florida 2 | Emory H. Price | Democratic | 1942 | Incumbent lost renomination. Democratic hold. | ▌ ✓ Charles E. Bennett (Democratic) 91.4%; ▌Camille Geneau (Republican) 8.6% |
| Florida 3 | Bob Sikes | Democratic | 1940; 1944 (resigned); 1974 | Incumbent re-elected. | ▌ ✓ Bob Sikes (Democratic); Uncontested |
| Florida 4 | George Smathers | Democratic | 1946 | Incumbent re-elected. | ▌ ✓ George Smathers (Democratic) 81.0%; ▌J. L. Wambaugh (Republican) 19.0% |
| Florida 5 | Joe Hendricks | Democratic | 1936 | Incumbent retired. Democratic hold. | ▌ ✓ Syd Herlong (Democratic) 70.6%; ▌M. J. Moss Jr. (Republican) 29.4% |
| Florida 6 | Dwight L. Rogers | Democratic | 1944 | Incumbent re-elected. | ▌ ✓ Dwight L. Rogers (Democratic) 66.7%; ▌Rolf Kaltenborn (Republican) 33.3% |

== Georgia ==
| District | Incumbent | Party | First elected | Result | Candidates |
|---|---|---|---|---|---|
| Georgia 1 | Prince Preston | Democratic | 1946 | Incumbent re-elected. | ▌ ✓ Prince Preston (Democratic); Uncontested |
| Georgia 2 | E. Eugene Cox | Democratic | 1924 | Incumbent re-elected. | ▌ ✓ E. Eugene Cox (Democratic); Uncontested |
| Georgia 3 | Stephen Pace | Democratic | 1936 | Incumbent re-elected. | ▌ ✓ Stephen Pace (Democratic); Uncontested |
| Georgia 4 | A. Sidney Camp | Democratic | 1939 (special) | Incumbent re-elected. | ▌ ✓ A. Sidney Camp (Democratic); Uncontested |
| Georgia 5 | James C. Davis | Democratic | 1946 | Incumbent re-elected. | ▌ ✓ James C. Davis (Democratic); Uncontested |
| Georgia 6 | Carl Vinson | Democratic | 1914 | Incumbent re-elected. | ▌ ✓ Carl Vinson (Democratic); Uncontested |
| Georgia 7 | Henderson L. Lanham | Democratic | 1946 | Incumbent re-elected. | ▌ ✓ Henderson L. Lanham (Democratic); Uncontested |
| Georgia 8 | William M. Wheeler | Democratic | 1946 | Incumbent re-elected. | ▌ ✓ William M. Wheeler (Democratic); Uncontested |
| Georgia 9 | John Stephens Wood | Democratic | 1944 | Incumbent re-elected. | ▌ ✓ John Stephens Wood (Democratic); Uncontested |
| Georgia 10 | Paul Brown | Democratic | 1933 | Incumbent re-elected. | ▌ ✓ Paul Brown (Democratic); Uncontested |

== Idaho ==
| District | Incumbent | Party | First elected | Result | Candidates |
|---|---|---|---|---|---|
| Idaho 1 | Abe Goff | Republican | 1946 | Incumbent lost re-election. Democratic gain. | ▌ ✓ Compton I. White (Democratic) 51.8%; ▌Abe Goff (Republican) 45.7%; ▌Thomas B. Wood (Progressive) 2.4%; ▌Richard M. Shaefer (Socialist) 0.1% |
| Idaho 2 | John C. Sanborn | Republican | 1946 | Incumbent re-elected. | ▌ ✓ John C. Sanborn (Republican) 50.7%; ▌Asael Lyman (Democratic) 48.5%; ▌C. W. Dill (Progressive) 0.8% |

== Illinois ==
Illinois redistricted its at-large seat into an additional geographical district for a total of 26, changing boundaries across the state and moving several seats from downstate into the Chicago suburbs.

| District | Incumbent | Party | First elected | Result | Candidates |
|---|---|---|---|---|---|
| Illinois 1 | William L. Dawson | Democratic | 1942 | Incumbent re-elected. | ▌ ✓ William L. Dawson (Democratic) 67.0%; ▌William E. King (Republican) 29.2%; ▌Earl B. Dickerson (Progressive) 3.8% |
| Illinois 2 | Richard B. Vail | Republican | 1946 | Incumbent lost re-election. Democratic gain. | ▌ ✓ Barratt O'Hara (Democratic) 50.5%; ▌Richard B. Vail (Republican) 46.9%; ▌Maynard C. Krueger (Independent) 2.5% |
| Illinois 3 | Fred E. Busbey | Republican | 1946 | Incumbent lost re-election. Democratic gain. | ▌ ✓ Neil J. Linehan (Democratic) 52.9%; ▌Fred E. Busbey (Republican) 47.1% |
| Illinois 4 | None (new district) | | | New seat. Democratic gain. | ▌ ✓ James V. Buckley (Democratic) 52.1%; ▌Leslie E. Salter (Republican) 47.9% |
| Illinois 5 | Martin Gorski; Redistricted from the 4th district | Democratic | 1942 | Incumbent re-elected. | ▌ ✓ Martin Gorski (Democratic) 72.4%; ▌John L. Waner (Republican) 27.6% |
| Illinois 6 | Thomas J. O'Brien | Democratic | 1942 | Incumbent re-elected. | ▌ ✓ Thomas J. O'Brien (Democratic) 68.4%; ▌John M. Coan (Republican) 28.6%; ▌Sidney L. Ordower (Progressive) 3.0% |
| Illinois 7 | Adolph J. Sabath; Redistricted from the 5th district | Democratic | 1906 | Incumbent re-elected. | ▌ ✓ Adolph J. Sabath (Democratic) 73.7%; ▌Francis C. Sperry (Republican) 26.3% |
| Illinois 8 | Thomas S. Gordon | Democratic | 1942 | Incumbent re-elected. | ▌ ✓ Thomas S. Gordon (Democratic) 65.1%; ▌Herbert F. Geisler (Republican) 34.9% |
| Illinois 9 | Robert Twyman | Republican | 1946 | Incumbent lost re-election. Democratic gain. | ▌ ✓ Sidney R. Yates (Democratic) 54.5%; ▌Robert Twyman (Republican) 43.8%; ▌Dorothy Bushnell Cole (Progressive) 1.7% |
| Illinois 10 | None (new district) | | | New seat. Republican gain. | ▌ ✓ Richard W. Hoffman (Republican) 58.1%; ▌Marvin J. Peters (Democratic) 41.9% |
| Illinois 11 | None (new district) | | | New seat. Democratic gain. | ▌ ✓ Chester A. Chesney (Democratic) 50.8%; ▌James C. Moreland (Republican) 49.2% |
| Illinois 12 | None (new district) | | | New seat. Republican gain. | ▌ ✓ Edgar A. Jonas (Republican) 51.3%; ▌Blair L. Varnes (Democratic) 46.1%; ▌Irving G. Steinberg (Progressive) 2.6% |
| Illinois 13 | Ralph E. Church; Redistricted from the 10th district | Republican | 1942 | Incumbent re-elected. | ▌ ✓ Ralph E. Church (Republican) 68.0%; ▌Willard C. Walters (Democratic) 32.0% |
| Illinois 13 | Thomas L. Owens; Redistricted from the 7th district | Republican | 1946 | Incumbent died. Republican loss. | ▌ ✓ Ralph E. Church (Republican) 68.0%; ▌Willard C. Walters (Democratic) 32.0% |
| Illinois 14 | Chauncey W. Reed; Redistricted from the 11th district | Republican | 1934 | Incumbent re-elected. | ▌ ✓ Chauncey W. Reed (Republican) 68.3%; ▌Richard Plum (Democratic) 31.7% |
| Illinois 15 | Noah M. Mason; Redistricted from the 12th district | Republican | 1936 | Incumbent re-elected. | ▌ ✓ Noah M. Mason (Republican) 56.4%; ▌G. M. Wells (Democratic) 43.6% |
| Illinois 16 | Leo E. Allen; Redistricted from the 13th district | Republican | 1932 | Incumbent re-elected. | ▌ ✓ Leo E. Allen (Republican) 58.5%; ▌Albert H. Manus Jr. (Democratic) 41.5% |
| Illinois 17 | Leslie C. Arends | Republican | 1934 | Incumbent re-elected. | ▌ ✓ Leslie C. Arends (Republican) 62.8%; ▌Carl Vrooman (Democratic) 37.2% |
| Illinois 18 | Everett Dirksen; Redistricted from the 16th district | Republican | 1932 | Incumbent retired. Republican hold. | ▌ ✓ Harold H. Velde (Republican) 52.1%; ▌Dale E. Sutton (Democratic) 47.9% |
| Illinois 19 | Robert B. Chiperfield; Redistricted from the 15th district | Republican | 1938 | Incumbent re-elected. | ▌ ✓ Robert B. Chiperfield (Republican) 54.0%; ▌Fred J. Brown (Democratic) 46.0% |
| Illinois 20 | Sid Simpson | Republican | 1942 | Incumbent re-elected. | ▌ ✓ Sid Simpson (Republican) 53.1%; ▌Henry D. Sullivan (Democratic) 46.9% |
| Illinois 20 | Anton J. Johnson; Redistricted from the 14th district | Republican | 1938 | Incumbent retired. Republican loss. | ▌ ✓ Sid Simpson (Republican) 53.1%; ▌Henry D. Sullivan (Democratic) 46.9% |
| Illinois 21 | George Evan Howell | Republican | 1940 | Incumbent resigned when appointed judge. Democratic gain. | ▌ ✓ Peter F. Mack Jr. (Democratic) 53.1%; ▌Joseph L. Moore (Republican) 46.9% |
| Illinois 22 | Rolla C. McMillen; Redistricted from the 19th district | Republican | 1944 | Incumbent re-elected. | ▌ ✓ Rolla C. McMillen (Republican) 53.2%; ▌Olive Remington Goldman (Democratic) 46.8% |
| Illinois 23 | Edward H. Jenison; Redistricted from the 18th district | Republican | 1946 | Incumbent re-elected. | ▌ ✓ Edward H. Jenison (Republican) 51.8%; ▌Wayne R. Cook (Democratic) 48.2% |
| Illinois 23 | Roy Clippinger; Redistricted from the 24th district | Republican | 1945 | Incumbent retired. Republican loss. | ▌ ✓ Edward H. Jenison (Republican) 51.8%; ▌Wayne R. Cook (Democratic) 48.2% |
| Illinois 24 | Charles W. Vursell; Redistricted from the 23rd district | Republican | 1942 | Incumbent re-elected. | ▌ ✓ Charles W. Vursell (Republican) 50.6%; ▌John David Upchurch (Democratic) 49.4% |
| Illinois 25 | Melvin Price; Redistricted from the 22nd district | Democratic | 1944 | Incumbent re-elected. | ▌ ✓ Melvin Price (Democratic) 69.5%; ▌Russell H. Classen (Republican) 30.5% |
| Illinois 26 | C. W. Bishop; Redistricted from the 25th district | Republican | 1940 | Incumbent re-elected. | ▌ ✓ C. W. Bishop (Republican) 51.9%; ▌Kent E. Keller (Democratic) 48.1% |
| Illinois at-large (defunct) | William Stratton | Republican | 1946 | Incumbent retired. District eliminated. Republican loss. | |

== Indiana ==
| District | Incumbent | Party | First elected | Result | Candidates |
|---|---|---|---|---|---|
| Indiana 1 | Ray Madden | Democratic | 1942 | Incumbent re-elected. | ▌ ✓ Ray Madden (Democratic) 60.7%; ▌Theodore L. Sendak (Republican) 38.6%; Others: ▌J. Ralston Miller (Prohibition) 0.6%; ▌Harvey E. Taylor (Socialist) 0.2% |
| Indiana 2 | Charles A. Halleck | Republican | 1935 | Incumbent re-elected. | ▌ ✓ Charles A. Halleck (Republican) 55.2%; ▌Theodore J. Smith (Democratic) 44.0%; ▌F. W. Lough (Prohibition) 0.8% |
| Indiana 3 | Robert A. Grant | Republican | 1938 | Incumbent lost re-election. Democratic gain. | ▌ ✓ Thurman C. Crook (Democratic) 51.9%; ▌Robert A. Grant (Republican) 47.4%; ▌Bristol Oesch (Prohibition) 0.6% |
| Indiana 4 | George W. Gillie | Republican | 1938 | Incumbent lost re-election. Democratic gain. | ▌ ✓ Edward H. Kruse (Democratic) 50.8%; ▌George W. Gillie (Republican) 48.3%; ▌Lewis Black (Prohibition) 0.9% |
| Indiana 5 | Forest Harness | Republican | 1938 | Incumbent lost re-election. Democratic gain. | ▌ ✓ John R. Walsh (Democratic) 51.9%; ▌Forest Harness (Republican) 46.8%; ▌Ralph G. Stallsmith (Prohibition) 1.3% |
| Indiana 6 | Noble J. Johnson | Republican | 1938 | Incumbent resigned when appointed to the CCPA. Republican hold. | ▌ ✓ Cecil M. Harden (Republican) 49.9%; ▌Jack J. O'Grady (Democratic) 49.5%; ▌Ernie Beck (Prohibition) 0.6% |
| Indiana 7 | Gerald W. Landis | Republican | 1938 | Incumbent lost re-election. Democratic gain. | ▌ ✓ James E. Noland (Democratic) 53.7%; ▌Gerald W. Landis (Republican) 45.3%; ▌Graydon E. Terbush (Prohibition) 1.0% |
| Indiana 8 | E. A. Mitchell | Republican | 1946 | Incumbent lost re-election. Democratic gain. | ▌ ✓ Winfield K. Denton (Democratic) 55.4%; ▌E. A. Mitchell (Republican) 44.1%; ▌Raymond Morris (Prohibition) 0.6% |
| Indiana 9 | Earl Wilson | Republican | 1940 | Incumbent re-elected. | ▌ ✓ Earl Wilson (Republican) 51.6%; ▌Christopher D. Moritz (Democratic) 47.7%; ▌Garnet Jewell (Prohibition) 0.7% |
| Indiana 10 | Ralph Harvey | Republican | 1947 | Incumbent re-elected. | ▌ ✓ Ralph Harvey (Republican) 52.5%; ▌Robert C. Oliver (Democratic) 46.3%; ▌LeRoy Mills (Prohibition) 1.2% |
| Indiana 11 | Louis Ludlow | Democratic | 1928 | Incumbent retired. Democratic hold. | ▌ ✓ Andrew Jacobs Sr. (Democratic) 50.6%; ▌George L. Denny (Republican) 48.4%; Others: ▌Willard B. Benson (Progressive) 0.5%; ▌Alston E. Wrentmore (Prohibition) 0.5% |

== Iowa ==
| District | Incumbent | Party | First elected | Result | Candidates |
|---|---|---|---|---|---|
| Iowa 1 | Thomas E. Martin | Republican | 1938 | Incumbent re-elected. | ▌ ✓ Thomas E. Martin (Republican) 53.5%; ▌James D. France (Democratic) 45.9%; Others: ▌Charles E. Dengler (Progressive) 0.5%; ▌Graydon R. Figg (Socialist) 0.06% |
| Iowa 2 | Henry O. Talle | Republican | 1938 | Incumbent re-elected. | ▌ ✓ Henry O. Talle (Republican) 57.4%; ▌T. W. Mullaney (Democratic) 42.1%; ▌Allen Heald (Progressive) 0.5% |
| Iowa 3 | John W. Gwynne | Republican | 1934 | Incumbent lost renomination. Republican hold. | ▌ ✓ H. R. Gross (Republican) 58.3%; ▌Dan J. P. Ryan (Democratic) 41.4%; ▌Paul Kindschi (Prohibition) 0.3% |
| Iowa 4 | Karl M. LeCompte | Republican | 1938 | Incumbent re-elected. | ▌ ✓ Karl M. LeCompte (Republican) 51.5%; ▌Steven V. Carter (Democratic) 48.2%; ▌Benson B. Compton (Prohibition) 0.3% |
| Iowa 5 | Paul Cunningham | Republican | 1940 | Incumbent re-elected. | ▌ ✓ Paul Cunningham (Republican) 50.8%; ▌Vince L. Browner (Democratic) 48.5%; Others: ▌William F. Martin (Progressive) 0.4%; ▌Richard DeCamp (Prohibition) 0.3% |
| Iowa 6 | James I. Dolliver | Republican | 1944 | Incumbent re-elected. | ▌ ✓ James I. Dolliver (Republican) 55.8%; ▌James E. Irwin (Democratic) 44.2% |
| Iowa 7 | Ben F. Jensen | Republican | 1938 | Incumbent re-elected. | ▌ ✓ Ben F. Jensen (Republican) 56.9%; ▌W. A. Byers (Democratic) 43.1% |
| Iowa 8 | Charles B. Hoeven | Republican | 1942 | Incumbent re-elected. | ▌ ✓ Charles B. Hoeven (Republican) 55.2%; ▌L. J. McGivern (Democratic) 44.4%; Others: ▌Simon Tjossem (Progressive) 0.3%; ▌Roy V. Bishop (Prohibition) 0.1% |

== Kansas ==
| District | Incumbent | Party | First elected | Result | Candidates |
|---|---|---|---|---|---|
| Kansas 1 | Albert M. Cole | Republican | 1944 | Incumbent re-elected. | ▌ ✓ Albert M. Cole (Republican) 60.5%; ▌James L. Quinn (Democratic) 39.5% |
| Kansas 2 | Errett P. Scrivner | Republican | 1943 (special) | Incumbent re-elected. | ▌ ✓ Errett P. Scrivner (Republican) 51.9%; ▌Philip A. Dergance (Democratic) 48.1% |
| Kansas 3 | Herbert A. Meyer | Republican | 1946 | Incumbent re-elected. | ▌ ✓ Herbert A. Meyer (Republican) 55.0%; ▌Marcus C. Black (Democratic) 45.0% |
| Kansas 4 | Edward H. Rees | Republican | 1936 | Incumbent re-elected. | ▌ ✓ Edward H. Rees (Republican) 55.6%; ▌William J. Kropp (Democratic) 44.4% |
| Kansas 5 | Clifford R. Hope | Republican | 1926 | Incumbent re-elected. | ▌ ✓ Clifford R. Hope (Republican) 65.0%; ▌Henry D. Parkinson (Democratic) 35.0% |
| Kansas 6 | Wint Smith | Republican | 1946 | Incumbent re-elected. | ▌ ✓ Wint Smith (Republican) 57.6%; ▌Leslie E. Davis (Democratic) 42.4% |

== Kentucky ==
| District | Incumbent | Party | First elected | Result | Candidates |
|---|---|---|---|---|---|
| Kentucky 1 | Noble Jones Gregory | Democratic | 1936 | Incumbent re-elected. | ▌ ✓ Noble Jones Gregory (Democratic); Uncontested |
| Kentucky 2 | John A. Whitaker | Democratic | 1948 (special) | Incumbent re-elected. | ▌ ✓ John A. Whitaker (Democratic) 63.4%; ▌Mallam Lake (Republican) 36.6% |
| Kentucky 3 | Thruston Ballard Morton | Republican | 1946 | Incumbent re-elected. | ▌ ✓ Thruston Ballard Morton (Republican) 53.0%; ▌Ralph H. Logan (Democratic) 46.3%; Others: ▌Alfred M. Carroll (Progressive) 0.5%; ▌Robert Jack Garrison (Prohibition) 0.2% |
| Kentucky 4 | Frank Chelf | Democratic | 1944 | Incumbent re-elected. | ▌ ✓ Frank Chelf (Democratic) 59.4%; ▌Stanley Jaggers (Republican) 40.6% |
| Kentucky 5 | Brent Spence | Democratic | 1930 | Incumbent re-elected. | ▌ ✓ Brent Spence (Democratic) 66.2%; ▌George T. Smith (Republican) 33.8% |
| Kentucky 6 | Virgil Chapman | Democratic | 1930 | Incumbent retired to run for U.S. senator. Democratic hold. | ▌ ✓ Thomas R. Underwood (Democratic) 60.7%; ▌John N. Menefee (Republican) 39.3% |
| Kentucky 7 | Wendell H. Meade | Republican | 1946 | Incumbent lost re-election. Democratic gain. | ▌ ✓ Carl D. Perkins (Democratic) 60.5%; ▌Wendell H. Meade (Republican) 39.5% |
| Kentucky 8 | Joe B. Bates | Democratic | 1930 | Incumbent re-elected. | ▌ ✓ Joe B. Bates (Democratic) 58.6%; ▌Hubert Counts (Republican) 38.2%; ▌Evelyn Jarvis (Write-in) 3.2% |
| Kentucky 9 | William Lewis | Republican | 1948 (special) | Incumbent retired. Republican hold. | ▌ ✓ James S. Golden (Republican); Uncontested |

== Louisiana ==
| District | Incumbent | Party | First elected | Result | Candidates |
|---|---|---|---|---|---|
| Louisiana 1 | F. Edward Hébert | Democratic | 1940 | Incumbent re-elected. | ▌ ✓ F. Edward Hébert (Democratic); Uncontested |
| Louisiana 2 | Hale Boggs | Democratic | 1940; 1942 (lost); 1946 | Incumbent re-elected. | ▌ ✓ Hale Boggs (Democratic); Uncontested |
| Louisiana 3 | James R. Domengeaux | Democratic | 1940 | Incumbent retired to run for U.S. senator. Democratic hold. | ▌ ✓ Edwin E. Willis (Democratic) 66.6%; ▌J. Paulin Duhe (Republican) 33.4% |
| Louisiana 4 | Overton Brooks | Democratic | 1936 | Incumbent re-elected. | ▌ ✓ Overton Brooks (Democratic); Uncontested |
| Louisiana 5 | Otto Passman | Democratic | 1946 | Incumbent re-elected. | ▌ ✓ Otto Passman (Democratic); Uncontested |
| Louisiana 6 | James H. Morrison | Democratic | 1942 | Incumbent re-elected. | ▌ ✓ James H. Morrison (Democratic); Uncontested |
| Louisiana 7 | Henry D. Larcade Jr. | Democratic | 1942 | Incumbent re-elected. | ▌ ✓ Henry D. Larcade Jr. (Democratic); Uncontested |
| Louisiana 8 | A. Leonard Allen | Democratic | 1936 | Incumbent re-elected. | ▌ ✓ A. Leonard Allen (Democratic); Uncontested |

== Maine ==
| District | Incumbent | Party | First elected | Result | Candidates |
|---|---|---|---|---|---|
| Maine 1 | Robert Hale | Republican | 1942 | Incumbent re-elected. | ▌ ✓ Robert Hale (Republican) 62.5%; ▌James A. McVicar (Democratic) 37.5% |
| Maine 2 | Margaret Chase Smith | Republican | 1940 | Incumbent retired to run for U.S. senator. Republican hold. | ▌ ✓ Charles P. Nelson (Republican) 67.2%; ▌Benjamin J. Arena (Democratic) 32.8% |
| Maine 3 | Frank Fellows | Republican | 1940 | Incumbent re-elected. | ▌ ✓ Frank Fellows (Republican) 70.9%; ▌F. Davis Clark (Democratic) 29.1% |

== Maryland ==
| District | Incumbent | Party | First elected | Result | Candidates |
|---|---|---|---|---|---|
| Maryland 1 | Edward Tylor Miller | Republican | 1946 | Incumbent re-elected. | ▌ ✓ Edward Tylor Miller (Republican) 52.4%; ▌S. Scott Beck Jr. (Democratic) 47.6% |
| Maryland 2 | Hugh Meade | Democratic | 1946 | Incumbent lost renomination. Democratic hold. | ▌ ✓ William P. Bolton (Democratic) 55.2%; ▌A. Earl Shipley (Republican) 42.5%; ▌Michael J. Clifford (Progressive) 2.3% |
| Maryland 3 | Edward Garmatz | Democratic | 1947 | Incumbent re-elected. | ▌ ✓ Edward Garmatz (Democratic) 68.8%; ▌John A. Janetzke Jr. (Republican) 28.1%; ▌Philip C. Kulinski (Progressive) 3.1% |
| Maryland 4 | George Hyde Fallon | Democratic | 1944 | Incumbent re-elected. | ▌ ✓ George Hyde Fallon (Democratic) 58.2%; ▌James W. Miller (Republican) 31.9%; ▌John E. T. Camper (Progressive) 9.9% |
| Maryland 5 | Lansdale Sasscer | Democratic | 1939 (special) | Incumbent re-elected. | ▌ ✓ Lansdale Sasscer (Democratic) 59.7%; ▌C. Maurice Weidemeyer (Republican) 40.3% |
| Maryland 6 | J. Glenn Beall | Republican | 1942 | Incumbent re-elected. | ▌ ✓ J. Glenn Beall (Republican) 55.3%; ▌F. Byrne Austin (Democratic) 44.7% |

== Massachusetts ==
| District | Incumbent | Party | First elected | Result | Candidates |
|---|---|---|---|---|---|
| Massachusetts 1 | John W. Heselton | Republican | 1944 | Incumbent re-elected. | ▌ ✓ John W. Heselton (Republican) 57.2%; ▌Patrick J. O'Malley (Democratic) 42.8% |
| Massachusetts 2 | Charles R. Clason | Republican | 1936 | Incumbent lost re-election. Democratic gain. | ▌ ✓ Foster Furcolo (Democratic) 54.9%; ▌Charles R. Clason (Republican) 45.1% |
| Massachusetts 3 | Philip J. Philbin | Democratic | 1942 | Incumbent re-elected. | ▌ ✓ Philip J. Philbin (Democratic) 73.9%; ▌Carroll H. Balcom (Republican) 26.1% |
| Massachusetts 4 | Harold Donohue | Democratic | 1946 | Incumbent re-elected. | ▌ ✓ Harold Donohue (Democratic) 59.2%; ▌John J. Maginnis (Republican) 40.8% |
| Massachusetts 5 | Edith Nourse Rogers | Republican | 1925 | Incumbent re-elected. | ▌ ✓ Edith Nourse Rogers (Republican); Uncontested |
| Massachusetts 6 | George J. Bates | Republican | 1936 | Incumbent re-elected. | ▌ ✓ George J. Bates (Republican); Uncontested |
| Massachusetts 7 | Thomas J. Lane | Democratic | 1941 | Incumbent re-elected. | ▌ ✓ Thomas J. Lane (Democratic) 79.2%; ▌A. Prescott Barker (Republican) 20.8% |
| Massachusetts 8 | Angier Goodwin | Republican | 1942 | Incumbent re-elected. | ▌ ✓ Angier Goodwin (Republican) 51.1%; ▌Anthony M. Roche (Democratic) 48.9% |
| Massachusetts 9 | Donald W. Nicholson | Republican | 1947 | Incumbent re-elected. | ▌ ✓ Donald W. Nicholson (Republican) 56.7%; ▌Jacinto F. Diniz (Democratic) 43.3% |
| Massachusetts 10 | Christian Herter | Republican | 1942 | Incumbent re-elected. | ▌ ✓ Christian Herter (Republican) 69.5%; ▌Walter A. O'Brien Jr. (Democratic) 30.5% |
| Massachusetts 11 | John F. Kennedy | Democratic | 1946 | Incumbent re-elected. | ▌ ✓ John F. Kennedy (Democratic); Uncontested |
| Massachusetts 12 | John W. McCormack | Democratic | 1928 | Incumbent re-elected. | ▌ ✓ John W. McCormack (Democratic); Uncontested |
| Massachusetts 13 | Richard B. Wigglesworth | Republican | 1928 | Incumbent re-elected. | ▌ ✓ Richard B. Wigglesworth (Republican) 56.6%; ▌David J. Concannon (Democratic) 43.4% |
| Massachusetts 14 | Joseph W. Martin Jr. | Republican | 1924 | Incumbent re-elected. | ▌ ✓ Joseph W. Martin Jr. (Republican) 61.4%; ▌Joseph M. Mendonca (Democratic) 38.6% |

== Michigan ==
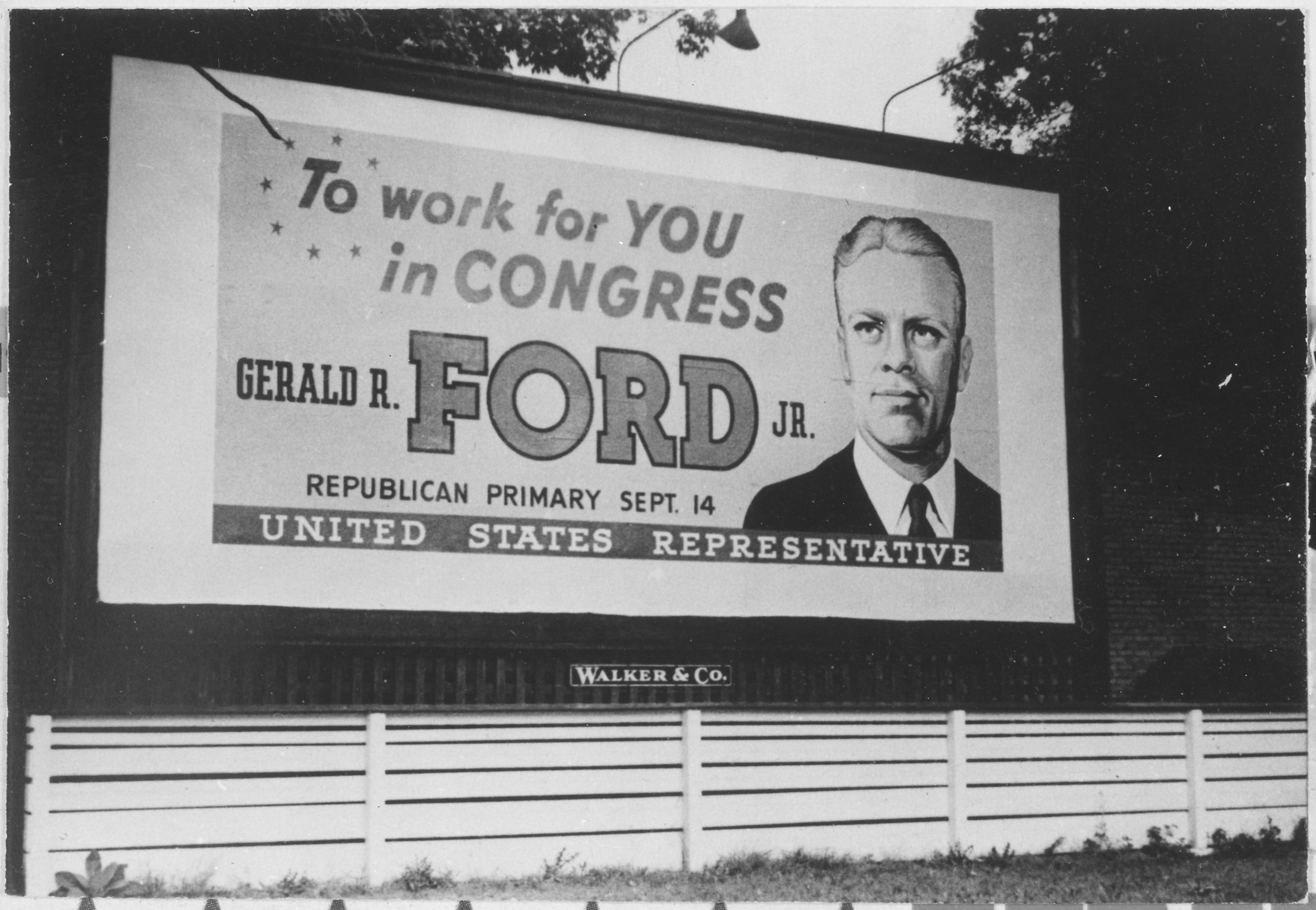
A billboard for challenger Gerald R. Ford Jr., seeking voter support over incumbent U.S. Representative Bartel J. Jonkman in the September 14, 1948 Michigan Republican primary. Ford won the primary and the general elections.

| District | Incumbent | Party | First elected | Result | Candidates |
|---|---|---|---|---|---|
| Michigan 1 | George G. Sadowski | Democratic | 1942 | Incumbent re-elected. | ▌ ✓ George G. Sadowski (Democratic) 83.4%; ▌Rudolph G. Tenerowicz (Republican) 16.0%; Others: ▌Norman Frazier (Prohibition) 0.3%; ▌Anthony Wojsowski (Socialist) 0.2% |
| Michigan 2 | Earl C. Michener | Republican | 1934 | Incumbent re-elected. | ▌ ✓ Earl C. Michener (Republican) 55.8%; ▌Preston W. Slossen (Democratic) 43.0%; Others: ▌Glenn Winters (Prohibition) 0.7%; ▌J. M. Geist (Progressive) 0.4%; ▌W. L. Miller (Socialist) 0.07% |
| Michigan 3 | Paul W. Shafer | Republican | 1936 | Incumbent re-elected. | ▌ ✓ Paul W. Shafer (Republican) 59.4%; ▌Leeman J. McCarty (Democratic) 38.7%; Others: ▌George L. Granger (Prohibition) 1.7%; ▌Nahum Burnett (Socialist) 0.1% |
| Michigan 4 | Clare E. Hoffman | Republican | 1934 | Incumbent re-elected. | ▌ ✓ Clare E. Hoffman (Republican) 64.9%; ▌Tom Surprise (Democratic) 33.4%; Others: ▌Ralph C. March (Prohibition) 1.1%; ▌Walter Mahnke (Progressive) 0.5%; ▌Frank Hayden (Socialist) 0.1% |
| Michigan 5 | Bartel J. Jonkman | Republican | 1940 | Incumbent lost renomination. Republican hold. | ▌ ✓ Gerald Ford (Republican) 60.5%; ▌Fred J. Barr Jr. (Democratic) 38.3%; Others: ▌William H. Bartlette (Prohibition) 0.7%; ▌Theodore Theodore (Progressive) 0.4%; ▌Eugene Ten Brink Sr. (Socialist) 0.08% |
| Michigan 6 | William W. Blackney | Republican | 1938 | Incumbent re-elected. | ▌ ✓ William W. Blackney (Republican) 49.8%; ▌George D. Stevens (Democratic) 49.3%; Others: ▌Howard E. Winters (Prohibition) 0.9%; ▌Seth Whitmore (Socialist) 0.1% |
| Michigan 7 | Jesse P. Wolcott | Republican | 1930 | Incumbent re-elected. | ▌ ✓ Jesse P. Wolcott (Republican) 59.0%; ▌Harvey C. Whetzel (Democratic) 40.3%; Others: ▌Clarence Dykehouse (Prohibition) 0.7%; ▌Meta Riseman (Socialist) 0.07% |
| Michigan 8 | Fred L. Crawford | Republican | 1934 | Incumbent re-elected. | ▌ ✓ Fred L. Crawford (Republican) 61.3%; ▌Louis C. Schwinger (Democratic) 37.1%; Others: ▌Rolland M. Severance (Prohibition) 1.3%; ▌Arthur J. Parent (Progressive) 0.2%; ▌Roy K. Nutson (Socialist) 0.07% |
| Michigan 9 | Albert J. Engel | Republican | 1934 | Incumbent re-elected. | ▌ ✓ Albert J. Engel (Republican) 58.5%; ▌John George Hosko (Democratic) 40.4%; Others: ▌William Meadows (Prohibition) 1.0%; ▌Alfred King (Socialist) 0.1% |
| Michigan 10 | Roy O. Woodruff | Republican | 1920 | Incumbent re-elected. | ▌ ✓ Roy O. Woodruff (Republican) 63.3%; ▌Edward J. Daugherty (Democratic) 35.7%; Others: ▌Harold E. Rice (Prohibition) 1.0%; ▌Thomas Vernon (Socialist) 0.1% |
| Michigan 11 | Charles E. Potter | Republican | 1947 | Incumbent re-elected. | ▌ ✓ Charles E. Potter (Republican) 63.6%; ▌Violet LaVergne Patterson (Democratic) 35.6%; Others: ▌Charles J. Swanson (Prohibition) 0.8%; ▌Woodrow Ingram (Socialist) 0.04% |
| Michigan 12 | John B. Bennett | Republican | 1946 | Incumbent re-elected. | ▌ ✓ John B. Bennett (Republican) 56.6%; ▌Gene A. Saari (Democratic) 42.8%; Others: ▌Olga Anderson (Prohibition) 0.6%; ▌Arthur Juntunen (Socialist) 0.1% |
| Michigan 13 | Howard A. Coffin | Republican | 1946 | Incumbent lost re-election. Democratic gain. | ▌ ✓ George D. O'Brien (Democratic) 62.5%; ▌Howard A. Coffin (Republican) 37.1%; Others: ▌H. C. Doane (Prohibition) 0.2%; ▌John Panzer (Socialist) 0.2% |
| Michigan 14 | Harold F. Youngblood | Republican | 1946 | Incumbent lost re-election. Democratic gain. | ▌ ✓ Louis C. Rabaut (Democratic) 56.9%; ▌Harold F. Youngblood (Republican) 42.7%; Others: ▌A. L. Leach (Prohibition) 0.2%; ▌A. H. Suppus (Socialist) 0.1% |
| Michigan 15 | John Dingell Sr. | Democratic | 1932 | Incumbent re-elected. | ▌ ✓ John Dingell Sr. (Democratic) 65.0%; ▌Charles G. Burns (Republican) 34.6%; Others: ▌Harold Drake (Prohibition) 0.2%; ▌Meyer Schneider (Socialist) 0.2% |
| Michigan 16 | John Lesinski Sr. | Democratic | 1932 | Incumbent re-elected. | ▌ ✓ John Lesinski Sr. (Democratic) 62.5%; ▌Kirby L. Wilson Jr. (Republican) 36.9%; Others: ▌Earl A. Johnson (Prohibition) 0.4%; ▌Paul Kerber (Socialist) 0.2% |
| Michigan 17 | George A. Dondero | Republican | 1932 | Incumbent re-elected. | ▌ ✓ George A. Dondero (Republican) 52.7%; ▌John J. Brown (Democratic) 46.8%; Others: ▌O. Lon Chaney (Prohibition) 0.3%; ▌Paul Oldenburg (Socialist) 0.1% |

== Minnesota ==
| District | Incumbent | Party | First elected | Result | Candidates |
|---|---|---|---|---|---|
| Minnesota 1 | August H. Andresen | Republican | 1934 | Incumbent re-elected. | ▌ ✓ August H. Andresen (Republican) 61.4%; ▌Karl Rolvaag (DFL) 38.6% |
| Minnesota 2 | Joseph P. O'Hara | Republican | 1940 | Incumbent re-elected. | ▌ ✓ Joseph P. O'Hara (Republican) 63.9%; ▌Milton F. Maxwell (DFL) 36.1% |
| Minnesota 3 | George MacKinnon | Republican | 1946 | Incumbent lost re-election. Democratic (DFL) gain. | ▌ ✓ Roy Wier (DFL) 54.6%; ▌George MacKinnon (Republican) 45.4% |
| Minnesota 4 | Edward Devitt | Republican | 1946 | Incumbent lost re-election. Democratic (DFL) gain. | ▌ ✓ Eugene McCarthy (DFL) 59.4%; ▌Edward Devitt (Republican) 40.6% |
| Minnesota 5 | Walter Judd | Republican | 1942 | Incumbent re-elected. | ▌ ✓ Walter Judd (Republican) 54.0%; ▌Marcella F. Killen (DFL) 46.0% |
| Minnesota 6 | Harold Knutson | Republican | 1934 | Incumbent lost re-election. Democratic (DFL) gain. | ▌ ✓ Fred Marshall (DFL) 51.7%; ▌Harold Knutson (Republican) 48.3% |
| Minnesota 7 | Herman Carl Andersen | Republican | 1938 | Incumbent re-elected. | ▌ ✓ Herman Carl Andersen (Republican) 52.5%; ▌James M. Youngdale (DFL) 47.5% |
| Minnesota 8 | John Blatnik | Democratic (DFL) | 1946 | Incumbent re-elected. | ▌ ✓ John Blatnik (DFL) 66.6%; ▌William A. Berlin (Republican) 33.4% |
| Minnesota 9 | Harold Hagen | Republican | 1944 | Incumbent re-elected. | ▌ ✓ Harold Hagen (Republican) 54.6%; ▌Oscar A. Johnson (DFL) 45.4% |

== Mississippi ==
| District | Incumbent | Party | First elected | Result | Candidates |
|---|---|---|---|---|---|
| Mississippi 1 | John E. Rankin | Democratic | 1920 | Incumbent re-elected. | ▌ ✓ John E. Rankin (Democratic); Uncontested |
| Mississippi 2 | Jamie Whitten | Democratic | 1941 | Incumbent re-elected. | ▌ ✓ Jamie Whitten (Democratic); Uncontested |
| Mississippi 3 | William Madison Whittington | Democratic | 1924 | Incumbent re-elected. | ▌ ✓ William Madison Whittington (Democratic); Uncontested |
| Mississippi 4 | Thomas Abernethy | Democratic | 1942 | Incumbent re-elected. | ▌ ✓ Thomas Abernethy (Democratic) 98.4%; ▌W. B. Smith (Republican) 1.6% |
| Mississippi 5 | W. Arthur Winstead | Democratic | 1942 | Incumbent re-elected. | ▌ ✓ W. Arthur Winstead (Democratic); Uncontested |
| Mississippi 6 | William M. Colmer | Democratic | 1932 | Incumbent re-elected. | ▌ ✓ William M. Colmer (Democratic); Uncontested |
| Mississippi 7 | John Bell Williams | Democratic | 1946 | Incumbent re-elected. | ▌ ✓ John Bell Williams (Democratic); Uncontested |

== Missouri ==
| District | Incumbent | Party | First elected | Result | Candidates |
|---|---|---|---|---|---|
| Missouri 1 | Samuel W. Arnold | Republican | 1942 | Incumbent lost re-election. Democratic gain. | ▌ ✓ Clare Magee (Democratic) 57.6%; ▌Samuel W. Arnold (Republican) 42.4% |
| Missouri 2 | Max Schwabe | Republican | 1942 | Incumbent lost re-election. Democratic gain. | ▌ ✓ Morgan M. Moulder (Democratic) 56.7%; ▌Max Schwabe (Republican) 43.2%; ▌Bruce D. Watkins (Progressive) 0.08% |
| Missouri 3 | William Clay Cole | Republican | 1942 | Incumbent lost re-election. Democratic gain. | ▌ ✓ Phil J. Welch (Democratic) 58.8%; ▌William Clay Cole (Republican) 41.2% |
| Missouri 4 | C. Jasper Bell | Democratic | 1934 | Incumbent retired. Democratic hold. | ▌ ✓ Leonard Irving (Democratic) 64.1%; ▌Richard A. Erickson (Republican) 35.7%; Others: ▌R. D. Farnsworth (Progressive) 0.2%; ▌Karl Oberheu (Socialist Labor) 0.01% |
| Missouri 5 | Albert L. Reeves Jr. | Republican | 1946 | Incumbent lost re-election. Democratic gain. | ▌ ✓ Richard W. Bolling (Democratic) 55.9%; ▌Albert L. Reeves Jr. (Republican) 44.1% |
| Missouri 6 | Marion T. Bennett | Republican | 1943 | Incumbent lost re-election. Democratic gain. | ▌ ✓ George H. Christopher (Democratic) 51.4%; ▌Marion T. Bennett (Republican) 48.6% |
| Missouri 7 | Dewey Short | Republican | 1934 | Incumbent re-elected. | ▌ ✓ Dewey Short (Republican) 54.0%; ▌Thomas A. Johnson (Democratic) 46.0% |
| Missouri 8 | Parke M. Banta | Republican | 1946 | Incumbent lost re-election. Democratic gain. | ▌ ✓ A. S. J. Carnahan (Democratic) 57.2%; ▌Parke M. Banta (Republican) 42.8%; ▌Clara (Mrs. Anthony) Hayes (Soc. Labor) 0.01% |
| Missouri 9 | Clarence Cannon | Democratic | 1922 | Incumbent re-elected. | ▌ ✓ Clarence Cannon (Democratic) 61.7%; ▌Robert V. Niedner (Republican) 38.3% |
| Missouri 10 | Orville Zimmerman | Democratic | 1934 | Incumbent died April 7, 1948. Democratic hold. Winner also elected to finish the current term; see above. | ▌ ✓ Paul C. Jones (Democratic) 71.6%; ▌Walter K. Dillon (Republican) 28.4% |
| Missouri 11 | Claude I. Bakewell | Republican | 1946 | Incumbent lost re-election. Democratic gain. | ▌ ✓ John B. Sullivan (Democratic) 64.6%; ▌Claude I. Bakewell (Republican) 33.7%; ▌Margaret Bush Wilson (Progressive) 1.7% |
| Missouri 12 | Walter C. Ploeser | Republican | 1940 | Incumbent lost re-election. Democratic gain. | ▌ ✓ Raymond W. Karst (Democratic) 55.0%; ▌Walter C. Ploeser (Republican) 44.6%; Others: ▌Clarence Bingaman (Progressive) 0.3%; ▌Berta O'Meara (Socialist) 0.1% |
| Missouri 13 | Frank M. Karsten | Democratic | 1946 | Incumbent re-elected. | ▌ ✓ Frank M. Karsten (Democratic) 70.6%; ▌Charles P. McBride (Republican) 29.4%; ▌William McNaught (Socialist Labor) 0.02% |

== Montana ==
| District | Incumbent | Party | First elected | Result | Candidates |
|---|---|---|---|---|---|
| Montana 1 | Mike Mansfield | Democratic | 1942 | Incumbent re-elected. | ▌ ✓ Mike Mansfield (Democratic) 67.9%; ▌Albert H. Angstman (Republican) 31.6%; ▌Floyd P. Jones (Socialist) 0.5% |
| Montana 2 | Wesley A. D'Ewart | Republican | 1945 (special) | Incumbent re-elected. | ▌ ✓ Wesley A. D'Ewart (Republican) 51.0%; ▌Willard E. Fraser (Democratic) 49.0% |

== Nebraska ==
| District | Incumbent | Party | First elected | Result | Candidates |
|---|---|---|---|---|---|
| Nebraska 1 | Carl Curtis | Republican | 1938 | Incumbent re-elected. | ▌ ✓ Carl Curtis (Republican) 57.2%; ▌Frank B. Morrison (Democratic) 42.8% |
| Nebraska 2 | Howard Buffett | Republican | 1942 | Incumbent lost re-election. Democratic gain. | ▌ ✓ Eugene D. O'Sullivan (Democratic) 51.4%; ▌Howard Buffett (Republican) 48.6% |
| Nebraska 3 | Karl Stefan | Republican | 1934 | Incumbent re-elected. | ▌ ✓ Karl Stefan (Republican) 64.8%; ▌Duane K. Peterson (Democratic) 35.2% |
| Nebraska 4 | Arthur L. Miller | Republican | 1942 | Incumbent re-elected. | ▌ ✓ Arthur L. Miller (Republican) 63.6%; ▌C. Edgar Leafdale (Democratic) 36.4% |

== Nevada ==
| District | Incumbent | Party | First elected | Result | Candidates |
|---|---|---|---|---|---|
| Nevada at-large | Charles H. Russell | Republican | 1946 | Incumbent lost re-election. Democratic gain. | ▌ ✓ Walter S. Baring Jr. (Democratic) 50.6%; ▌Charles H. Russell (Republican) 49.4% |

== New Hampshire ==
| District | Incumbent | Party | First elected | Result | Candidates |
|---|---|---|---|---|---|
| New Hampshire 1 | Chester Earl Merrow | Republican | 1942 | Incumbent re-elected. | ▌ ✓ Chester Earl Merrow (Republican) 55.5%; ▌Peter R. Poirier (Democratic) 43.9%; ▌Alexander Karanikas (Progressive) 0.6% |
| New Hampshire 2 | Norris Cotton | Republican | 1946 | Incumbent re-elected. | ▌ ✓ Norris Cotton (Republican) 57.4%; ▌Richard W. Leonard (Democratic) 41.8%; ▌Harold H. Horne (Progressive) 0.8% |

== New Jersey ==
| District | Incumbent | Party | First elected | Result | Candidates |
|---|---|---|---|---|---|
| New Jersey 1 | Charles A. Wolverton | Republican | 1926 | Incumbent re-elected. | ▌ ✓ Charles A. Wolverton (Republican) 53.0%; ▌John W. Donges (Democratic) 45.8%; Others: ▌Philip H. Van Gelder (Progressive) 0.9%; ▌Morris Stempa (Socialist) 0.3% |
| New Jersey 2 | T. Millet Hand | Republican | 1944 | Incumbent re-elected. | ▌ ✓ T. Millet Hand (Republican) 61.7%; ▌William E. Stringer (Democratic) 37.5%; ▌Thomas F. Ogilvie (Progressive) 0.8% |
| New Jersey 3 | James C. Auchincloss | Republican | 1942 | Incumbent re-elected. | ▌ ✓ James C. Auchincloss (Republican) 58.5%; ▌Charles F. Sullivan (Democratic) 40.0%; Others: ▌Sidney Stolberg (Progressive) 1.3%; ▌James S. Pemberton (Prohibition) 0.2% |
| New Jersey 4 | Frank A. Mathews Jr. | Republican | 1945 (special) | Incumbent retired. Democratic gain. | ▌ ✓ Charles R. Howell (Democratic) 61.5%; ▌Albert C. Jones (Republican) 38.5% |
| New Jersey 5 | Charles A. Eaton | Republican | 1924 | Incumbent re-elected. | ▌ ✓ Charles A. Eaton (Republican) 57.4%; ▌George C. Miller (Democratic) 41.3%; Others: ▌John Schein (Progressive) 1.3%; ▌Emily R. G. Klein (Prohibition) 0.09% |
| New Jersey 6 | Clifford P. Case | Republican | 1944 | Incumbent re-elected. | ▌ ✓ Clifford P. Case (Republican) 55.3%; ▌H. Frank Pettit (Democratic) 40.8%; ▌Daniel Wagner (Progressive) 2.8%; ▌Margaret Cameron Lowe (Prohibition) 1.1% |
| New Jersey 7 | J. Parnell Thomas | Republican | 1936 | Incumbent re-elected. | ▌ ✓ J. Parnell Thomas (Republican) 56.2%; ▌John J. Carlin (Democratic) 43.2%; ▌McAlister Coleman (Socialist) 0.6% |
| New Jersey 8 | Gordon Canfield | Republican | 1940 | Incumbent re-elected. | ▌ ✓ Gordon Canfield (Republican) 47.5%; ▌Charles S. Joelson (Democratic) 47.4%; ▌Peter J. Toth (Independent) 3.8%; ▌Joseph Carie (Independent) 1.3% |
| New Jersey 9 | Harry L. Towe | Republican | 1942 | Incumbent re-elected. | ▌ ✓ Harry L. Towe (Republican) 62.2%; ▌James S. Brown (Democratic) 37.8% |
| New Jersey 10 | Fred A. Hartley Jr. | Republican | 1928 | Incumbent retired. Democratic gain. | ▌ ✓ Peter W. Rodino (Democratic) 50.7%; ▌Anthony Guiliano (Republican) 45.7%; ▌John V. Laddey (Independent) 3.3%; ▌William H. Schafer (Prohibition) 0.3% |
| New Jersey 11 | Frank Sundstrom | Republican | 1942 | Incumbent lost re-election. Democratic gain. | ▌ ✓ Hugh J. Addonizio (Democratic) 47.7%; ▌Frank Sundstrom (Republican) 46.2%; ▌Ulysses Campbell (Progressive) 2.8%; Others: ▌William E. Bohannon (Socialist Workers) 2.2%; ▌Wesley U. Morris (Prohibition) 0.8%; ▌Gerald Harris (Socialist) 0.4% |
| New Jersey 12 | Robert Kean | Republican | 1938 | Incumbent re-elected. | ▌ ✓ Robert Kean (Republican) 50.8%; ▌Harry Dudkin (Democratic) 47.0%; Others: ▌Katherine A. Van Orden (Progressive) 1.9%; ▌William H. Farrell (Prohibition) 0.2% |
| New Jersey 13 | Mary Teresa Norton | Democratic | 1924 | Incumbent re-elected. | ▌ ✓ Mary Teresa Norton (Democratic) 68.1%; ▌Leon Banach (Republican) 31.9% |
| New Jersey 14 | Edward J. Hart | Democratic | 1934 | Incumbent re-elected. | ▌ ✓ Edward J. Hart (Democratic) 62.8%; ▌Michael Bongiovanni (Republican) 37.2% |

== New Mexico ==
| District | Incumbent | Party | First elected | Result | Candidates |
|---|---|---|---|---|---|
| New Mexico at-large | Antonio M. Fernández | Democratic | 1942 | Incumbent re-elected. | ▌ ✓ John E. Miles (Democratic) 29.8%; ▌ ✓ Antonio M. Fernández (Democratic) 28.9%; ▌Ben F. Meyer (Republican) 21.1%; ▌Herman G. Baca (Republican) 20.2% |
| New Mexico at-large | Georgia Lee Lusk | Democratic | 1946 | Incumbent lost renomination. Democratic hold. | ▌ ✓ John E. Miles (Democratic) 29.8%; ▌ ✓ Antonio M. Fernández (Democratic) 28.9%; ▌Ben F. Meyer (Republican) 21.1%; ▌Herman G. Baca (Republican) 20.2% |

== New York ==
| District | Incumbent | Party | First elected | Result | Candidates |
|---|---|---|---|---|---|
| New York 1 | W. Kingsland Macy | Republican | 1946 | Incumbent re-elected. | ▌ ✓ W. Kingsland Macy (Republican) 66.0%; ▌Harold W. Worzel (Democratic) 31.6%; ▌Marjorie Viemeister (American Labor) 2.4% |
| New York 2 | Leonard W. Hall | Republican | 1938 | Incumbent re-elected. | ▌ ✓ Leonard W. Hall (Republican) 68.1%; ▌Richard T. Mayes (Democratic) 31.9% |
| New York 3 | Henry J. Latham | Republican | 1944 | Incumbent re-elected. | ▌ ✓ Henry J. Latham (Republican) 56.5%; ▌George J. Gross (Democratic) 35.3%; ▌Herbert A. Shingler (American Labor) 4.9%; ▌Bertram H. Siegeltuch (Liberal) 3.3% |
| New York 4 | Gregory McMahon | Republican | 1946 | Incumbent lost re-election. Democratic gain. | ▌ ✓ L. Gary Clemente (Democratic) 46.9%; ▌Gregory McMahon (Republican) 43.8%; ▌Thomas J. McCabe (American Labor) 5.8%; ▌Mark Starr (Liberal) 3.5% |
| New York 5 | Robert Tripp Ross | Republican | 1946 | Incumbent lost re-election. Democratic gain. | ▌ ✓ T. Vincent Quinn (Democratic) 49.8%; ▌Robert Tripp Ross (Republican) 43.1%; ▌Morris Pottish (American Labor) 7.2% |
| New York 6 | Robert Nodar Jr. | Republican | 1946 | Incumbent lost re-election. Democratic gain. | ▌ ✓ James J. Delaney (Democratic) 57.2%; ▌Robert Nodar Jr. (Republican) 36.8%; ▌Irma Lindheim (American Labor) 6.0% |
| New York 7 | John J. Delaney | Democratic | 1931 | Incumbent re-elected. | ▌ ✓ John J. Delaney (Democratic) 60.0%; ▌Francis E. Dorn (Republican) 40.0% |
| New York 8 | Joseph L. Pfeifer | Democratic | 1934 | Incumbent re-elected. | ▌ ✓ Joseph L. Pfeifer (Democratic) 67.7%; ▌Benjamin F. Westervelt Jr. (Republican) 28.6%; ▌August Claessens (Liberal) 3.7% |
| New York 9 | Eugene James Keogh | Democratic | 1936 | Incumbent re-elected. | ▌ ✓ Eugene James Keogh (Democratic) 56.2%; ▌Philip Hodes (Republican) 25.1%; ▌Murray Rosof (American Labor) 18.6% |
| New York 10 | Andrew Lawrence Somers | Democratic | 1924 | Incumbent re-elected. | ▌ ✓ Andrew Lawrence Somers (Democratic) 56.1%; ▌Arthur S. Hirsch (Republican) 26.1%; ▌Ada B. Jackson (American Labor) 17.8% |
| New York 11 | James J. Heffernan | Democratic | 1940 | Incumbent re-elected. | ▌ ✓ James J. Heffernan (Democratic) 54.9%; ▌Alfred C. McKenzie (Republican) 30.2%; ▌Frank Serri (American Labor) 14.9% |
| New York 12 | John J. Rooney | Democratic | 1944 | Incumbent re-elected. | ▌ ✓ John J. Rooney (Democratic) 60.4%; ▌John J. Miller (Republican) 31.9%; ▌Vincent J. Longhi (American Labor) 7.7% |
| New York 13 | Donald L. O'Toole | Democratic | 1936 | Incumbent re-elected. | ▌ ✓ Donald L. O'Toole (Democratic) 52.8%; ▌Charles A. Fisher (Republican) 35.7%; ▌James Griesi (American Labor) 11.5% |
| New York 14 | Abraham J. Multer | Democratic | 1947 | Incumbent re-elected. | ▌ ✓ Abraham J. Multer (Democratic) 77.8%; ▌Lee Pressman (American Labor) 22.2% |
| New York 15 | Emanuel Celler | Democratic | 1922 | Incumbent re-elected. | ▌ ✓ Emanuel Celler (Democratic) 81.4%; ▌Henry D. Dorfman (Republican) 18.6% |
| New York 16 | Ellsworth B. Buck | Republican | 1944 | Incumbent retired. Democratic gain. | ▌ ✓ James J. Murphy (Democratic) 49.3%; ▌Frank A. Pavis (Republican) 44.0%; ▌Frank Cremonesi (American Labor) 6.7% |
| New York 17 | Frederic René Coudert Jr. | Republican | 1946 | Incumbent re-elected. | ▌ ✓ Frederic René Coudert Jr. (Republican) 53.2%; ▌Arthur T. Sawyer (Democratic) 37.2%; ▌Alvin Udell (American Labor) 9.6% |
| New York 18 | Vito Marcantonio | American Labor | 1938 | Incumbent re-elected. | ▌ ✓ Vito Marcantonio (American Labor) 36.9%; ▌John P. Morrissey (Democratic) 31.7%; ▌John Ellis (Republican) 31.4% |
| New York 19 | Arthur George Klein | Democratic | 1946 | Incumbent re-elected. | ▌ ✓ Arthur George Klein (Democratic) 74.4%; ▌Herbert Lasky (Republican) 19.9%; ▌Stephen C. Vladeck (Liberal) 5.7%; ▌Emanuel Geltman (Socialist Workers) 0.1% |
| New York 20 | Sol Bloom | Democratic | 1923 | Incumbent re-elected. | ▌ ✓ Sol Bloom (Democratic) 59.4%; ▌Jules J. Justin (Republican) 28.0%; ▌Eugene P. Connolly (American Labor) 12.6% |
| New York 21 | Jacob K. Javits | Republican | 1946 | Incumbent re-elected. | ▌ ✓ Jacob K. Javits (Republican) 50.9%; ▌Paul O'Dwyer (Democratic) 49.1% |
| New York 22 | Adam Clayton Powell Jr. | Democratic | 1944 | Incumbent re-elected. | ▌ ✓ Adam Clayton Powell Jr. (Democratic) 76.4%; ▌Harold C. Burton (Republican) 16.9%; ▌Edna O. Moseley (Liberal) 6.7% |
| New York 23 | Walter A. Lynch | Democratic | 1940 | Incumbent re-elected. | ▌ ✓ Walter A. Lynch (Democratic) 83.0%; ▌Leon Straus (American Labor) 17.0% |
| New York 24 | Leo Isacson | American Labor | 1948 (special) | Incumbent lost re-election. Democratic gain. | ▌ ✓ Isidore Dollinger (Democratic) 63.1%; ▌Leo Isacson (American Labor) 36.9% |
| New York 25 | Charles A. Buckley | Democratic | 1934 | Incumbent re-elected. | ▌ ✓ Charles A. Buckley (Democratic) 82.2%; ▌Albert E. Kahn (American Labor) 17.8% |
| New York 26 | David M. Potts | Republican | 1946 | Incumbent lost re-election. Democratic gain. | ▌ ✓ Christopher C. McGrath (Democratic) 54.8%; ▌David M. Potts (Republican) 34.2%; ▌Nicholas Carnes (American Labor) 11.0% |
| New York 27 | Ralph W. Gwinn | Republican | 1944 | Incumbent re-elected. | ▌ ✓ Ralph W. Gwinn (Republican) 52.1%; ▌Richard W. McSpedon (Democratic) 43.4%; ▌Francis X. Nulty (American Labor) 4.6% |
| New York 28 | Ralph A. Gamble | Republican | 1937 | Incumbent re-elected. | ▌ ✓ Ralph A. Gamble (Republican) 62.7%; ▌Charles J. Nager (Democratic) 32.7%; ▌Pasquale Barile (American Labor) 4.7% |
| New York 29 | Katharine St. George | Republican | 1946 | Incumbent re-elected. | ▌ ✓ Katharine St. George (Republican) 60.1%; ▌William G. Pendergast (Democratic) 36.5%; ▌Harold Meredith Chown (American Labor) 3.4% |
| New York 30 | Jay Le Fevre | Republican | 1942 | Incumbent re-elected. | ▌ ✓ Jay Le Fevre (Republican) 64.8%; ▌Robert R. Decormier (Democratic) 35.2% |
| New York 31 | Bernard W. Kearney | Republican | 1942 | Incumbent re-elected. | ▌ ✓ Bernard W. Kearney (Republican) 55.3%; ▌William M. Murphy (Democratic) 41.4%; ▌Andrew Peterson (American Labor) 3.3% |
| New York 32 | William T. Byrne | Democratic | 1936 | Incumbent re-elected. | ▌ ✓ William T. Byrne (Democratic) 55.6%; ▌Lawrence J. Collins (Republican) 41.1%; ▌Margaret L. Wheeler (American Labor) 3.4% |
| New York 33 | Dean P. Taylor | Republican | 1942 | Incumbent re-elected. | ▌ ✓ Dean P. Taylor (Republican) 63.7%; ▌Joseph T. Hammer (Democratic) 33.6%; ▌Rockwell Kent (American Labor) 2.7% |
| New York 34 | Clarence E. Kilburn | Republican | 1940 | Incumbent re-elected. | ▌ ✓ Clarence E. Kilburn (Republican) 60.7%; ▌Francis K. Purcell (Democratic) 37.6%; ▌Raymond Bull (American Labor) 1.8% |
| New York 35 | Hadwen C. Fuller | Republican | 1943 | Incumbent lost re-election. Democratic gain. | ▌ ✓ John C. Davies II (Democratic) 48.9%; ▌Hadwen C. Fuller (Republican) 48.8%; ▌Max Meyers (American Labor) 2.3% |
| New York 36 | R. Walter Riehlman | Republican | 1946 | Incumbent re-elected. | ▌ ✓ R. Walter Riehlman (Republican) 50.5%; ▌Richard T. Mosher (Democratic) 46.3%; ▌Sidney H. Greenburg (American Labor) 3.1% |
| New York 37 | Edwin Arthur Hall | Republican | 1939 (special) | Incumbent re-elected. | ▌ ✓ Edwin Arthur Hall (Republican) 63.4%; ▌Myron C. Sloat (Democratic) 34.2%; ▌John Mushock (American Labor) 1.8%; ▌Pierre De Nio (Liberal) 0.6% |
| New York 38 | John Taber | Republican | 1922 | Incumbent re-elected. | ▌ ✓ John Taber (Republican) 58.0%; ▌Francis J. Souhan (Democratic) 42.0% |
| New York 39 | W. Sterling Cole | Republican | 1934 | Incumbent re-elected. | ▌ ✓ W. Sterling Cole (Republican) 64.3%; ▌Donald J. O'Connor (Democratic) 33.9%; ▌Harold Slingerland (American Labor) 1.8% |
| New York 40 | Kenneth B. Keating | Republican | 1946 | Incumbent re-elected. | ▌ ✓ Kenneth B. Keating (Republican) 51.4%; ▌George F. Rogers (Democratic) 48.6% |
| New York 41 | James W. Wadsworth Jr. | Republican | 1932 | Incumbent re-elected. | ▌ ✓ James W. Wadsworth Jr. (Republican) 59.1%; ▌Bernard E. Hart (Democratic) 39.3%; ▌Helen Lopez (American Labor) 1.6% |
| New York 42 | Walter G. Andrews | Republican | 1930 | Incumbent retired. Republican hold. | ▌ ✓ William L. Pfeiffer (Republican) 51.1%; ▌Mary Louise Nice (Democratic) 46.6%; ▌Emanuel Fried (American Labor) 2.3% |
| New York 43 | Edward J. Elsaesser | Republican | 1944 | Incumbent lost re-election. Democratic gain. | ▌ ✓ Anthony F. Tauriello (Democratic) 50.8%; ▌Edward J. Elsaesser (Republican) 46.8%; ▌George Provost (American Labor) 2.3% |
| New York 44 | John Cornelius Butler | Republican | 1941 | Incumbent lost re-election. Democratic gain. | ▌ ✓ Chester C. Gorski (Democratic) 51.8%; ▌John Cornelius Butler (Republican) 46.2%; ▌Robert Williams (American Labor) 2.0% |
| New York 45 | Daniel A. Reed | Republican | 1918 | Incumbent re-elected. | ▌ ✓ Daniel A. Reed (Republican) 60.1%; ▌Hubert D. Bliss (Democratic) 36.5%; ▌Lewis King (American Labor) 2.2%; ▌Elmer Olson (Liberal) 1.2% |

== North Carolina ==
| District | Incumbent | Party | First elected | Result | Candidates |
|---|---|---|---|---|---|
| North Carolina 1 | Herbert Covington Bonner | Democratic | 1940 | Incumbent re-elected. | ▌ ✓ Herbert Covington Bonner (Democratic) 92.7%; ▌Zeno O. Ratcliff (Republican) 7.3% |
| North Carolina 2 | John H. Kerr | Democratic | 1923 | Incumbent re-elected. | ▌ ✓ John H. Kerr (Democratic) 96.0%; ▌J. H. Satterthwaite (Republican) 3.7%; ▌Robert Lathan (Progressive) 0.3% |
| North Carolina 3 | Graham A. Barden | Democratic | 1934 | Incumbent re-elected. | ▌ ✓ Graham A. Barden (Democratic) 78.8%; ▌Perry G. Crumpler (Republican) 21.2% |
| North Carolina 4 | Harold D. Cooley | Democratic | 1934 | Incumbent re-elected. | ▌ ✓ Harold D. Cooley (Democratic) 78.1%; ▌Joel A. Johnson (Republican) 21.5%; ▌James H. Wright (Progressive) 0.4% |
| North Carolina 5 | John Hamlin Folger | Democratic | 1941 | Incumbent retired. Democratic hold. | ▌ ✓ R. Thurmond Chatham (Democratic) 72.7%; ▌John Tucker Day (Republican) 26.1%; ▌Harvey A. Cox Jr. (Progressive) 1.2% |
| North Carolina 6 | Carl T. Durham | Democratic | 1938 | Incumbent re-elected. | ▌ ✓ Carl T. Durham (Democratic) 72.1%; ▌Ralph O. Smith (Republican) 25.5%; ▌M. H. Ross (Progressive) 2.4% |
| North Carolina 7 | J. Bayard Clark | Democratic | 1928 | Incumbent retired. Democratic hold. | ▌ ✓ F. Ertel Carlyle (Democratic) 84.3%; ▌J. O. West (Republican) 15.3%; ▌Robert E. Davis (Progressive) 0.4% |
| North Carolina 8 | Charles B. Deane | Democratic | 1946 | Incumbent re-elected. | ▌ ✓ Charles B. Deane (Democratic) 62.7%; ▌Lafayette Williams (Republican) 37.3% |
| North Carolina 9 | Robert L. Doughton | Democratic | 1910 | Incumbent re-elected. | ▌ ✓ Robert L. Doughton (Democratic) 59.6%; ▌Clyde R. Greene (Republican) 40.4% |
| North Carolina 10 | Hamilton C. Jones | Democratic | 1946 | Incumbent re-elected. | ▌ ✓ Hamilton C. Jones (Democratic) 59.6%; ▌Roy A. Harmon (Republican) 40.1%; ▌Ralph Lael (Progressive) 0.3% |
| North Carolina 11 | Alfred L. Bulwinkle | Democratic | 1930 | Incumbent re-elected. | ▌ ✓ Alfred L. Bulwinkle (Democratic) 64.9%; ▌Calvin R. Edney (Republican) 35.1% |
| North Carolina 12 | Monroe M. Redden | Democratic | 1946 | Incumbent re-elected. | ▌ ✓ Monroe M. Redden (Democratic) 63.1%; ▌W. W. Candler (Republican) 36.9% |

== North Dakota ==
| District | Incumbent | Party | First elected | Result | Candidates |
|---|---|---|---|---|---|
| North Dakota at-large | William Lemke | Republican-NPL | 1942 | Incumbent re-elected. | ▌ ✓ William Lemke (Republican-NPL) 41.5%; ▌ ✓ Usher L. Burdick (Republican-NPL) 40.2%; ▌Alfred Dale (Democratic) 17.8%; ▌John M. Weiler (Progressive) 0.6% |
| North Dakota at-large | Charles R. Robertson | Republican | 1944 | Incumbent lost renomination. Republican hold. | ▌ ✓ William Lemke (Republican-NPL) 41.5%; ▌ ✓ Usher L. Burdick (Republican-NPL) 40.2%; ▌Alfred Dale (Democratic) 17.8%; ▌John M. Weiler (Progressive) 0.6% |

== Ohio ==
| District | Incumbent | Party | First elected | Result | Candidates |
|---|---|---|---|---|---|
| Ohio 1 | Charles H. Elston | Republican | 1938 | Incumbent re-elected. | ▌ ✓ Charles H. Elston (Republican) 51.6%; ▌Morse Johnson (Democratic) 48.4% |
| Ohio 2 | William E. Hess | Republican | 1938 | Incumbent lost re-election. Democratic gain. | ▌ ✓ Earl T. Wagner (Democratic) 52.8%; ▌William E. Hess (Republican) 47.2% |
| Ohio 3 | Raymond H. Burke | Republican | 1946 | Incumbent lost re-election. Democratic gain. | ▌ ✓ Edward G. Breen (Democratic) 58.2%; ▌Raymond H. Burke (Republican) 41.8% |
| Ohio 4 | William Moore McCulloch | Republican | 1947 | Incumbent re-elected. | ▌ ✓ William Moore McCulloch (Republican) 55.7%; ▌Earl Ludwig (Democratic) 44.3% |
| Ohio 5 | Cliff Clevenger | Republican | 1938 | Incumbent re-elected. | ▌ ✓ Cliff Clevenger (Republican) 52.1%; ▌Dan Batt (Democratic) 47.9% |
| Ohio 6 | Edward O. McCowen | Republican | 1942 | Incumbent lost re-election. Democratic gain. | ▌ ✓ James G. Polk (Democratic) 53.1%; ▌Edward O. McCowen (Republican) 46.9% |
| Ohio 7 | Clarence J. Brown | Republican | 1938 | Incumbent re-elected. | ▌ ✓ Clarence J. Brown (Republican); Uncontested |
| Ohio 8 | Frederick C. Smith | Republican | 1938 | Incumbent re-elected. | ▌ ✓ Frederick C. Smith (Republican) 54.5%; ▌Andrew T. Durbin (Democratic) 45.5% |
| Ohio 9 | Homer A. Ramey | Republican | 1942 | Incumbent lost re-election. Democratic gain. | ▌ ✓ Thomas Henry Burke (Democratic) 53.8%; ▌Homer A. Ramey (Republican) 46.2% |
| Ohio 10 | Thomas A. Jenkins | Republican | 1924 | Incumbent re-elected. | ▌ ✓ Thomas A. Jenkins (Republican) 57.9%; ▌Delmar A. Canaday (Democratic) 42.1% |
| Ohio 11 | Walter E. Brehm | Republican | 1942 | Incumbent re-elected. | ▌ ✓ Walter E. Brehm (Republican) 50.8%; ▌Joseph C. Allen (Democratic) 49.2% |
| Ohio 12 | John M. Vorys | Republican | 1938 | Incumbent re-elected. | ▌ ✓ John M. Vorys (Republican) 52.1%; ▌Robert M. Draper (Democratic) 47.9% |
| Ohio 13 | Alvin F. Weichel | Republican | 1942 | Incumbent re-elected. | ▌ ✓ Alvin F. Weichel (Republican) 59.2%; ▌Dwight A. Blackmore (Democratic) 40.8% |
| Ohio 14 | Walter B. Huber | Democratic | 1944 | Incumbent re-elected. | ▌ ✓ Walter B. Huber (Democratic) 57.2%; ▌Ed Rowe (Republican) 42.2%; ▌Harry Hurtt Jr. (Independent) 0.6% |
| Ohio 15 | Percy W. Griffiths | Republican | 1942 | Incumbent lost re-election. Democratic gain. | ▌ ✓ Robert T. Secrest (Democratic) 56.4%; ▌Percy W. Griffiths (Republican) 43.6% |
| Ohio 16 | Henderson H. Carson | Republican | 1946 | Incumbent lost re-election. Democratic gain. | ▌ ✓ John McSweeney (Democratic) 52.6%; ▌Henderson H. Carson (Republican) 47.4% |
| Ohio 17 | J. Harry McGregor | Republican | 1940 | Incumbent re-elected. | ▌ ✓ J. Harry McGregor (Republican) 52.9%; ▌Robert W. Levering (Democratic) 47.1% |
| Ohio 18 | Earl R. Lewis | Republican | 1942 | Incumbent lost re-election. Democratic gain. | ▌ ✓ Wayne Hays (Democratic) 54.1%; ▌Earl R. Lewis (Republican) 45.9% |
| Ohio 19 | Michael J. Kirwan | Democratic | 1936 | Incumbent re-elected. | ▌ ✓ Michael J. Kirwan (Democratic) 68.1%; ▌William Bacon (Republican) 31.9% |
| Ohio 20 | Michael A. Feighan | Democratic | 1942 | Incumbent re-elected. | ▌ ✓ Michael A. Feighan (Democratic); Uncontested |
| Ohio 21 | Robert Crosser | Democratic | 1922 | Incumbent re-elected. | ▌ ✓ Robert Crosser (Democratic) 75.9%; ▌Harry W. Mitchell (Republican) 24.1% |
| Ohio 22 | Frances P. Bolton | Republican | 1940 | Incumbent re-elected. | ▌ ✓ Frances P. Bolton (Republican) 54.7%; ▌Jack G. Day (Democratic) 45.3% |
| Ohio at-large | George H. Bender | Republican | 1938 | Incumbent lost re-election. Democratic gain. | ▌ ✓ Stephen M. Young (Democratic) 52.0%; ▌George H. Bender (Republican) 48.0% |

== Oklahoma ==
| District | Incumbent | Party | First elected | Result | Candidates |
|---|---|---|---|---|---|
| Oklahoma 1 | George B. Schwabe | Republican | 1944 | Incumbent lost re-election. Democratic gain. | ▌ ✓ Dixie Gilmer (Democratic) 53.3%; ▌George B. Schwabe (Republican) 46.7% |
| Oklahoma 2 | William G. Stigler | Democratic | 1944 | Incumbent re-elected. | ▌ ✓ William G. Stigler (Democratic) 69.7%; ▌George T. Balch (Republican) 30.3% |
| Oklahoma 3 | Carl Albert | Democratic | 1946 | Incumbent re-elected. | ▌ ✓ Carl Albert (Democratic) 83.9%; ▌Russell Overstreet (Republican) 16.1% |
| Oklahoma 4 | Glen D. Johnson | Democratic | 1946 | Incumbent retired to run for U.S. senator. Democratic hold. | ▌ ✓ Tom Steed (Democratic) 72.1%; ▌Clyde T. Patrick (Republican) 27.9% |
| Oklahoma 5 | Mike Monroney | Democratic | 1938 | Incumbent re-elected. | ▌ ✓ Mike Monroney (Democratic) 67.4%; ▌Carmon C. Harris (Republican) 32.6% |
| Oklahoma 6 | Toby Morris | Democratic | 1946 | Incumbent re-elected. | ▌ ✓ Toby Morris (Democratic) 73.7%; ▌George E. Young (Republican) 26.3% |
| Oklahoma 7 | Preston E. Peden | Democratic | 1946 | Incumbent lost renomination. Democratic hold. | ▌ ✓ Victor Wickersham (Democratic) 79.4%; ▌J. Warren White (Republican) 20.6% |
| Oklahoma 8 | Ross Rizley | Republican | 1940 | Incumbent retired to run for U.S. senator. Democratic gain. | ▌ ✓ George H. Wilson (Democratic) 58.0%; ▌Martin Garber (Republican) 42.0% |

== Oregon ==
| District | Incumbent | Party | First elected | Result | Candidates |
|---|---|---|---|---|---|
| Oregon 1 | A. Walter Norblad | Republican | 1946 | Incumbent re-elected. | ▌ ✓ A. Walter Norblad (Republican) 63.2%; ▌Edward E. Gideon (Democratic) 32.8%; ▌Theodore Wolcott (Progressive) 4.0% |
| Oregon 2 | Lowell Stockman | Republican | 1942 | Incumbent re-elected. | ▌ ✓ Lowell Stockman (Republican) 58.2%; ▌C. J. Shorb (Democratic) 41.8% |
| Oregon 3 | Homer D. Angell | Republican | 1938 | Incumbent re-elected. | ▌ ✓ Homer D. Angell (Republican) 55.5%; ▌Roland C. Bartlett (Democratic) 37.1%; ▌Peggy T. Carlson (Progressive) 7.4% |
| Oregon 4 | Harris Ellsworth | Republican | 1942 | Incumbent re-elected. | ▌ ✓ Harris Ellsworth (Republican) 66.6%; ▌William F. Tanton (Democratic) 33.4% |

== Pennsylvania ==
| District | Incumbent | Party | First elected | Result | Candidates |
|---|---|---|---|---|---|
| Pennsylvania 1 | James A. Gallagher | Republican | 1946 | Incumbent lost renomination. Democratic gain. | ▌ ✓ William A. Barrett (Democratic) 53.4%; ▌John De Nero (Republican) 46.6% |
| Pennsylvania 2 | Robert N. McGarvey | Republican | 1946 | Incumbent lost re-election. Democratic gain. | ▌ ✓ William T. Granahan (Democratic) 54.3%; ▌Robert N. McGarvey (Republican) 45.7% |
| Pennsylvania 3 | Hardie Scott | Republican | 1946 | Incumbent re-elected. | ▌ ✓ Hardie Scott (Republican) 52.0%; ▌Maurice S. Osser (Democratic) 48.0% |
| Pennsylvania 4 | Franklin J. Maloney | Republican | 1946 | Incumbent lost re-election. Democratic gain. | ▌ ✓ Earl Chudoff (Democratic) 55.7%; ▌Franklin J. Maloney (Republican) 39.9%; ▌Joseph H. Rainey (Progressive) 4.5% |
| Pennsylvania 5 | George W. Sarbacher Jr. | Republican | 1946 | Incumbent lost re-election. Democratic gain. | ▌ ✓ William J. Green Jr. (Democratic) 50.7%; ▌George W. Sarbacher Jr. (Republican) 49.3% |
| Pennsylvania 6 | Hugh Scott | Republican | 1946 | Incumbent re-elected. | ▌ ✓ Hugh Scott (Republican) 57.0%; ▌Herbert J. McGlinchey (Democratic) 43.0% |
| Pennsylvania 7 | E. Wallace Chadwick | Republican | 1946 | Incumbent lost renomination. Republican hold. | ▌ ✓ Benjamin F. James (Republican) 61.3%; ▌Arnold M. Snyder (Democratic) 37.8%; ▌John C. Wolf (Progressive) 0.9% |
| Pennsylvania 8 | Franklin H. Lichtenwalter | Republican | 1947 | Incumbent re-elected. | ▌ ✓ Franklin H. Lichtenwalter (Republican) 59.2%; ▌Wynne James Jr. (Democratic) 40.8% |
| Pennsylvania 9 | Paul B. Dague | Republican | 1946 | Incumbent re-elected. | ▌ ✓ Paul B. Dague (Republican) 67.1%; ▌W. Roger Simpson (Democratic) 32.9% |
| Pennsylvania 10 | James P. Scoblick | Republican | 1946 | Incumbent lost renomination. Democratic gain. | ▌ ✓ Harry P. O'Neill (Democratic) 58.5%; ▌Nelson Nichols (Republican) 41.5% |
| Pennsylvania 11 | Mitchell Jenkins | Republican | 1946 | Incumbent retired. Democratic gain. | ▌ ✓ Daniel Flood (Democratic) 51.8%; ▌Robert H. Stroh (Republican) 48.2% |
| Pennsylvania 12 | Ivor D. Fenton | Republican | 1938 | Incumbent re-elected. | ▌ ✓ Ivor D. Fenton (Republican) 60.6%; ▌John Oshinskie (Democratic) 39.4% |
| Pennsylvania 13 | Frederick Augustus Muhlenberg | Republican | 1946 | Incumbent lost re-election. Democratic gain. | ▌ ✓ George M. Rhodes (Democratic) 50.3%; ▌Frederick Augustus Muhlenberg (Republican) 46.4%; ▌Raymond S. Hofses (Socialist) 3.3% |
| Pennsylvania 14 | Wilson D. Gillette | Republican | 1941 | Incumbent re-elected. | ▌ ✓ Wilson D. Gillette (Republican) 65.2%; ▌David Burchell (Democratic) 34.8% |
| Pennsylvania 15 | Robert F. Rich | Republican | 1944 | Incumbent re-elected. | ▌ ✓ Robert F. Rich (Republican) 61.6%; ▌Patrick A. McGowan (Democratic) 38.4% |
| Pennsylvania 16 | Samuel K. McConnell Jr. | Republican | 1944 | Incumbent re-elected. | ▌ ✓ Samuel K. McConnell Jr. (Republican) 66.9%; ▌Henry Hellar Kelly (Democratic) 33.1% |
| Pennsylvania 17 | Richard M. Simpson | Republican | 1937 | Incumbent re-elected. | ▌ ✓ Richard M. Simpson (Republican) 64.5%; ▌Ira Garman (Democratic) 35.5% |
| Pennsylvania 18 | John C. Kunkel | Republican | 1938 | Incumbent re-elected. | ▌ ✓ John C. Kunkel (Republican) 63.7%; ▌Theodore C. Frederick Jr. (Democratic) 36.3% |
| Pennsylvania 19 | Leon H. Gavin | Republican | 1942 | Incumbent re-elected. | ▌ ✓ Leon H. Gavin (Republican) 63.7%; ▌Francis J. Manno (Democratic) 36.3% |
| Pennsylvania 20 | Francis E. Walter | Democratic | 1932 | Incumbent re-elected. | ▌ ✓ Francis E. Walter (Democratic) 58.8%; ▌Roy E. James (Republican) 41.2% |
| Pennsylvania 21 | Chester H. Gross | Republican | 1942 | Incumbent lost re-election. Democratic gain. | ▌ ✓ James F. Lind (Democratic) 53.7%; ▌Chester H. Gross (Republican) 46.3% |
| Pennsylvania 22 | James E. Van Zandt | Republican | 1946 | Incumbent re-elected. | ▌ ✓ James E. Van Zandt (Republican) 60.4%; ▌Julia Luigia Maietta (Democratic) 39.6% |
| Pennsylvania 23 | William J. Crow | Republican | 1946 | Incumbent lost re-election. Democratic gain. | ▌ ✓ Anthony Cavalcante (Democratic) 54.3%; ▌William J. Crow (Republican) 45.7% |
| Pennsylvania 24 | Thomas E. Morgan | Democratic | 1944 | Incumbent re-elected. | ▌ ✓ Thomas E. Morgan (Democratic) 65.4%; ▌Roy A. Purviance (Republican) 34.6% |
| Pennsylvania 25 | Louis E. Graham | Republican | 1938 | Incumbent re-elected. | ▌ ✓ Louis E. Graham (Republican) 52.6%; ▌Andrew G. Katcher (Democratic) 47.4% |
| Pennsylvania 26 | Harve Tibbott | Republican | 1938 | Incumbent lost re-election. Democratic gain. | ▌ ✓ Robert L. Coffey Jr. (Democratic) 55.4%; ▌Harve Tibbott (Republican) 44.6% |
| Pennsylvania 27 | Augustine B. Kelley | Democratic | 1940 | Incumbent re-elected. | ▌ ✓ Augustine B. Kelley (Democratic) 62.2%; ▌W. Urban Gillespie (Republican) 37.8% |
| Pennsylvania 28 | Carroll D. Kearns | Republican | 1946 | Incumbent re-elected. | ▌ ✓ Carroll D. Kearns (Republican) 54.5%; ▌James A. Kennedy (Democratic) 45.5% |
| Pennsylvania 29 | John McDowell | Republican | 1946 | Incumbent lost re-election. Democratic gain. | ▌ ✓ Harry J. Davenport (Democratic) 54.2%; ▌John McDowell (Republican) 45.8% |
| Pennsylvania 30 | Robert J. Corbett | Republican | 1938; 1940 (lost); 1944 | Incumbent re-elected. | ▌ ✓ Robert J. Corbett (Republican) 50.3%; ▌J. R. Montgomery (Democratic) 49.7% |
| Pennsylvania 31 | James G. Fulton | Republican | 1944 | Incumbent re-elected. | ▌ ✓ James G. Fulton (Republican) 56.4%; ▌John J. Kane Jr. (Democratic) 43.6% |
| Pennsylvania 32 | Herman P. Eberharter | Democratic | 1936 | Incumbent re-elected. | ▌ ✓ Herman P. Eberharter (Democratic) 72.7%; ▌Albert J. Weilersbacher (Republican) 27.3% |
| Pennsylvania 33 | Frank Buchanan | Democratic | 1946 | Incumbent re-elected. | ▌ ✓ Frank Buchanan (Democratic) 69.2%; ▌Albert G. Brown (Republican) 30.8% |

== Rhode Island ==
| District | Incumbent | Party | First elected | Result | Candidates |
|---|---|---|---|---|---|
| Rhode Island 1 | Aime Forand | Democratic | 1940 | Incumbent re-elected. | ▌ ✓ Aime Forand (Democratic) 61.9%; ▌Oscar J. V. Hurteau (Republican) 38.1% |
| Rhode Island 2 | John E. Fogarty | Democratic | 1940 | Incumbent re-elected. | ▌ ✓ John E. Fogarty (Democratic) 59.7%; ▌Thomas J. Paolino (Republican) 40.3% |

== South Carolina ==
| District | Incumbent | Party | First elected | Result | Candidates |
|---|---|---|---|---|---|
| South Carolina 1 | L. Mendel Rivers | Democratic | 1940 | Incumbent re-elected. | ▌ ✓ L. Mendel Rivers (Democratic) 89.1%; ▌W. Tate Baggott (Republican) 10.9% |
| South Carolina 2 | John J. Riley | Democratic | 1944 | Incumbent lost renomination. Democratic hold. | ▌ ✓ Hugo S. Sims Jr. (Democratic) 96.4%; ▌W. Edward Moore (Republican) 3.6% |
| South Carolina 3 | William Jennings Bryan Dorn | Democratic | 1946 | Incumbent retired to run for U.S. senator. Democratic hold. | ▌ ✓ James Butler Hare (Democratic) 97.9%; ▌D. F. Merill (Republican) 2.1% |
| South Carolina 4 | Joseph R. Bryson | Democratic | 1938 | Incumbent re-elected. | ▌ ✓ Joseph R. Bryson (Democratic) 94.9%; ▌James B. Gaston (Republican) 5.1% |
| South Carolina 5 | James P. Richards | Democratic | 1932 | Incumbent re-elected. | ▌ ✓ James P. Richards (Democratic) 97.1%; ▌J. D. Hambright (Republican) 2.9% |
| South Carolina 6 | John L. McMillan | Democratic | 1938 | Incumbent re-elected. | ▌ ✓ John L. McMillan (Democratic) 97.1%; ▌Frank L. Bradfield (Republican) 2.9% |

== South Dakota ==
| District | Incumbent | Party | First elected | Result | Candidates |
|---|---|---|---|---|---|
| South Dakota 1 | Karl Mundt | Republican | 1938 | Incumbent retired to run for U.S. senator. Republican hold. | ▌ ✓ Harold Lovre (Republican) 53.5%; ▌Merton B. Tice (Democratic) 46.5% |
| South Dakota 2 | Francis Case | Republican | 1936 | Incumbent re-elected. | ▌ ✓ Francis Case (Republican) 65.9%; ▌Jessie E. Sanders (Democratic) 34.1% |

== Tennessee ==
| District | Incumbent | Party | First elected | Result | Candidates |
|---|---|---|---|---|---|
| Tennessee 1 | Dayton E. Phillips | Republican | 1946 | Incumbent re-elected. | ▌ ✓ Dayton E. Phillips (Republican) 84.7%; ▌Arthur W. Bright (Independent) 15.3% |
| Tennessee 2 | John Jennings | Republican | 1939 (special) | Incumbent re-elected. | ▌ ✓ John Jennings (Republican) 58.0%; ▌Thomas P. Fowler (Democratic) 42.0% |
| Tennessee 3 | Estes Kefauver | Democratic | 1939 (special) | Incumbent retired to run for U.S. senator. Democratic hold. | ▌ ✓ James B. Frazier Jr. (Democratic) 67.3%; ▌W. E. Michael (Republican) 31.3%; ▌J. B. Stoner (Independent) 1.4% |
| Tennessee 4 | Albert Gore Sr. | Democratic | 1938 | Incumbent re-elected. | ▌ ✓ Albert Gore Sr. (Democratic) 64.3%; ▌Tom T. Tucker Jr. (Republican) 35.7% |
| Tennessee 5 | Joe L. Evins | Democratic | 1946 | Incumbent re-elected. | ▌ ✓ Joe L. Evins (Democratic); Uncontested |
| Tennessee 6 | Percy Priest | Democratic | 1940 | Incumbent re-elected. | ▌ ✓ Percy Priest (Democratic) 81.4%; ▌Jesse L. Perry (Republican) 17.0%; ▌E. C. Loftis (Independent) 1.5% |
| Tennessee 7 | W. Wirt Courtney | Democratic | 1939 (special) | Incumbent lost renomination. Democratic hold. | ▌ ✓ James Patrick Sutton (Democratic); Uncontested |
| Tennessee 8 | Tom J. Murray | Democratic | 1942 | Incumbent re-elected. | ▌ ✓ Tom J. Murray (Democratic) 69.2%; ▌J. Sam Johnson Jr. (Republican) 30.8% |
| Tennessee 9 | Jere Cooper | Democratic | 1928 | Incumbent re-elected. | ▌ ✓ Jere Cooper (Democratic) 91.1%; ▌S. Homer Tatum (Republican) 8.9% |
| Tennessee 10 | Clifford Davis | Democratic | 1940 | Incumbent re-elected. | ▌ ✓ Clifford Davis (Democratic) 93.1%; ▌Dwight V. Kyle (Progressive) 6.9% |

== Texas ==
| District | Incumbent | Party | First elected | Result | Candidates |
|---|---|---|---|---|---|
| Texas 1 | Wright Patman | Democratic | 1928 | Incumbent re-elected. | ▌ ✓ Wright Patman (Democratic); Uncontested |
| Texas 2 | Jesse M. Combs | Democratic | 1944 | Incumbent re-elected. | ▌ ✓ Jesse M. Combs (Democratic) 93.3%; ▌Don Parker (Republican) 6.7% |
| Texas 3 | Lindley Beckworth | Democratic | 1938 | Incumbent re-elected. | ▌ ✓ Lindley Beckworth (Democratic) 88.7%; ▌R. E. Kennedy (Republican) 11.3% |
| Texas 4 | Sam Rayburn | Democratic | 1912 | Incumbent re-elected. | ▌ ✓ Sam Rayburn (Democratic); Uncontested |
| Texas 5 | Joseph Franklin Wilson | Democratic | 1946 | Incumbent re-elected. | ▌ ✓ Joseph Franklin Wilson (Democratic) 98.4%; ▌Joe Bailey Irwin (Progressive) 1.6% |
| Texas 6 | Olin E. Teague | Democratic | 1946 | Incumbent re-elected. | ▌ ✓ Olin E. Teague (Democratic) 99.8%; ▌J. Hayden Moore Sr. (Progressive) 0.2% |
| Texas 7 | Tom Pickett | Democratic | 1944 | Incumbent re-elected. | ▌ ✓ Tom Pickett (Democratic); Uncontested |
| Texas 8 | Albert Thomas | Democratic | 1936 | Incumbent re-elected. | ▌ ✓ Albert Thomas (Democratic) 85.5%; ▌Joe Ingraham (Republican) 14.5% |
| Texas 9 | Clark W. Thompson | Democratic | 1947 | Incumbent re-elected. | ▌ ✓ Clark W. Thompson (Democratic); Uncontested |
| Texas 10 | Lyndon B. Johnson | Democratic | 1937 | Incumbent retired to run for U.S. senator. Democratic hold. | ▌ ✓ Homer Thornberry (Democratic); Uncontested |
| Texas 11 | William R. Poage | Democratic | 1936 | Incumbent re-elected. | ▌ ✓ William R. Poage (Democratic) 96.3%; ▌A. A. Warrington (Democratic) 3.7% |
| Texas 12 | Wingate H. Lucas | Democratic | 1946 | Incumbent re-elected. | ▌ ✓ Wingate H. Lucas (Democratic) 89.1%; ▌Elton M. Hyder (Republican) 10.9% |
| Texas 13 | Ed Gossett | Democratic | 1938 | Incumbent re-elected. | ▌ ✓ Ed Gossett (Democratic); Uncontested |
| Texas 14 | John E. Lyle Jr. | Democratic | 1944 | Incumbent re-elected. | ▌ ✓ John E. Lyle Jr. (Democratic) 88.9%; ▌James M. Swafford (Republican) 10.9%; ▌Tom Neal (Progressive) 0.2% |
| Texas 15 | Milton H. West | Democratic | 1933 | Incumbent retired. Democratic hold. | ▌ ✓ Lloyd Bentsen (Democratic); Uncontested |
| Texas 16 | Kenneth M. Regan | Democratic | 1947 | Incumbent re-elected. | ▌ ✓ Kenneth M. Regan (Democratic) 99.5%; ▌J. B. Chavez (Progressive) 0.5% |
| Texas 17 | Omar Burleson | Democratic | 1946 | Incumbent re-elected. | ▌ ✓ Omar Burleson (Democratic); Uncontested |
| Texas 18 | Eugene Worley | Democratic | 1940 | Incumbent re-elected. | ▌ ✓ Eugene Worley (Democratic) 88.7%; ▌J. Evetts Haley (Republican) 11.3% |
| Texas 19 | George H. Mahon | Democratic | 1934 | Incumbent re-elected. | ▌ ✓ George H. Mahon (Democratic) 95.6%; ▌Mohler D. Temple (Republican) 4.4% |
| Texas 20 | Paul J. Kilday | Democratic | 1938 | Incumbent re-elected. | ▌ ✓ Paul J. Kilday (Democratic) 75.3%; ▌J. P. Ledvina (Republican) 24.7% |
| Texas 21 | O. C. Fisher | Democratic | 1942 | Incumbent re-elected. | ▌ ✓ O. C. Fisher (Democratic); Uncontested |

== Utah ==
| District | Incumbent | Party | First elected | Result | Candidates |
|---|---|---|---|---|---|
| Utah 1 | Walter K. Granger | Democratic | 1940 | Incumbent re-elected. | ▌ ✓ Walter K. Granger (Democratic) 59.0%; ▌David J. Wilson (Republican) 41.0% |
| Utah 2 | William A. Dawson | Republican | 1946 | Incumbent lost re-election. Democratic gain. | ▌ ✓ Reva Beck Bosone (Democratic) 57.5%; ▌William A. Dawson (Republican) 42.5% |

== Vermont ==
| District | Incumbent | Party | First elected | Result | Candidates |
|---|---|---|---|---|---|
| Vermont at-large | Charles Albert Plumley | Republican | 1934 | Incumbent re-elected. | ▌ ✓ Charles Albert Plumley (Republican) 60.8%; ▌Robert W. Ready (Democratic) 39.2% |

== Virginia ==
| District | Incumbent | Party | First elected | Result | Candidates |
|---|---|---|---|---|---|
| Virginia 1 | S. Otis Bland | Democratic | 1918 | Incumbent re-elected. | ▌ ✓ S. Otis Bland (Democratic) 80.0%; ▌Stanley G. Adams (Republican) 18.6%; ▌J. Luther Kibler (Socialist) 1.4% |
| Virginia 2 | Porter Hardy Jr. | Democratic | 1946 | Incumbent re-elected. | ▌ ✓ Porter Hardy Jr. (Democratic) 61.2%; ▌Walter E. Hoffman (Republican) 34.4%; ▌Jerry O. Gilliam (Progressive) 4.2%; ▌Sidney Moore (Socialist) 0.3% |
| Virginia 3 | J. Vaughan Gary | Democratic | 1945 (special) | Incumbent re-elected. | ▌ ✓ J. Vaughan Gary (Democratic) 72.9%; ▌Richard C. Poage (Republican) 24.3%; Others: ▌David P. Bennett (Communist) 1.7%; ▌Mary D. Fleet (Socialist) 1.1% |
| Virginia 4 | Watkins Abbitt | Democratic | 1948 (special) | Incumbent re-elected. | ▌ ✓ Watkins Abbitt (Democratic); Uncontested |
| Virginia 5 | Thomas B. Stanley | Democratic | 1946 | Incumbent re-elected. | ▌ ✓ Thomas B. Stanley (Democratic) 99.5%; ▌Gene Graybeal (Write-in) 0.5% |
| Virginia 6 | J. Lindsay Almond | Democratic | 1946 (special) | Incumbent resigned April 17, 1948 to become Attorney General of Virginia. Democratic hold. Winner was also elected to finish the current term; see above. | ▌ ✓ Clarence G. Burton (Democratic) 64.7%; ▌John Strickler (Republican) 34.7%; ▌J. B. Brayman (Socialist) 0.7% |
| Virginia 7 | Burr Harrison | Democratic | 1946 | Incumbent re-elected. | ▌ ✓ Burr Harrison (Democratic) 60.4%; ▌Stephen D. Timberlake (Republican) 39.6% |
| Virginia 8 | Howard W. Smith | Democratic | 1930 | Incumbent re-elected. | ▌ ✓ Howard W. Smith (Democratic) 54.8%; ▌Tyrrell Krum (Republican) 41.5%; Others: ▌Frank M. Hurst (Independent) 1.9%; ▌Sarah H. Davila (Progressive) 1.8% |
| Virginia 9 | John W. Flannagan Jr. | Democratic | 1930 | Incumbent retired. Democratic hold. | ▌ ✓ Thomas B. Fugate (Democratic) 52.4%; ▌T. Eugene Worrell (Republican) 47.6% |

== Washington ==
| District | Incumbent | Party | First elected | Result | Candidates |
|---|---|---|---|---|---|
| Washington 1 | Homer Jones | Republican | 1946 | Incumbent lost re-election. Democratic gain. | ▌ ✓ Hugh Mitchell (Democratic) 50.8%; ▌Homer Jones (Republican) 46.8%; ▌William J. Pennock (Progressive) 2.4% |
| Washington 2 | Henry M. Jackson | Democratic | 1940 | Incumbent re-elected. | ▌ ✓ Henry M. Jackson (Democratic) 61.6%; ▌Payson Peterson (Republican) 35.6%; ▌Elmer D. Needham (Progressive) 2.8% |
| Washington 3 | Russell V. Mack | Republican | 1947 | Incumbent re-elected. | ▌ ✓ Russell V. Mack (Republican) 52.1%; ▌Charles R. Savage (Democratic) 47.9% |
| Washington 4 | Hal Holmes | Republican | 1942 | Incumbent re-elected. | ▌ ✓ Hal Holmes (Republican) 53.2%; ▌John F. Eubank (Democratic) 46.8% |
| Washington 5 | Walt Horan | Republican | 1942 | Incumbent re-elected. | ▌ ✓ Walt Horan (Republican) 54.6%; ▌John F. McKay (Democratic) 45.4% |
| Washington 6 | Thor C. Tollefson | Republican | 1946 | Incumbent re-elected. | ▌ ✓ Thor C. Tollefson (Republican) 55.1%; ▌Jack E. Knudsen (Democratic) 40.9%; ▌Ernest Thor Olson (Progressive) 4.0% |

== West Virginia ==
| District | Incumbent | Party | First elected | Result | Candidates |
|---|---|---|---|---|---|
| West Virginia 1 | Francis J. Love | Republican | 1946 | Incumbent lost re-election. Democratic gain. | ▌ ✓ Robert L. Ramsay (Democratic) 57.3%; ▌Francis J. Love (Republican) 42.7% |
| West Virginia 2 | Melvin C. Snyder | Republican | 1946 | Incumbent lost re-election. Democratic gain. | ▌ ✓ Harley Orrin Staggers (Democratic) 54.7%; ▌Melvin C. Snyder (Republican) 45.3% |
| West Virginia 3 | Edward G. Rohrbough | Republican | 1946 | Incumbent lost re-election. Democratic gain. | ▌ ✓ Cleveland M. Bailey (Democratic) 57.1%; ▌Edward G. Rohrbough (Republican) 42.9% |
| West Virginia 4 | Hubert S. Ellis | Republican | 1942 | Incumbent lost re-election. Democratic gain. | ▌ ✓ Maurice G. Burnside (Democratic) 53.1%; ▌Hubert S. Ellis (Republican) 46.9% |
| West Virginia 5 | John Kee | Democratic | 1932 | Incumbent re-elected. | ▌ ✓ John Kee (Democratic) 65.1%; ▌Hartley Sanders (Republican) 34.9% |
| West Virginia 6 | E. H. Hedrick | Democratic | 1944 | Incumbent re-elected. | ▌ ✓ E. H. Hedrick (Democratic) 62.5%; ▌D. L. Salisbury (Republican) 37.5% |

== Wisconsin ==
| District | Incumbent | Party | First elected | Result | Candidates |
|---|---|---|---|---|---|
| Wisconsin 1 | Lawrence H. Smith | Republican | 1941 | Incumbent re-elected. | ▌ ✓ Lawrence H. Smith (Republican) 51.9%; ▌Jack Harvey (Democratic) 47.6%; ▌John C. Spence (Social-Democratic) 0.5% |
| Wisconsin 2 | Glenn Robert Davis | Republican | 1947 | Incumbent re-elected. | ▌ ✓ Glenn Robert Davis (Republican) 53.9%; ▌Horace W. Wilkie (Democratic) 45.6%; ▌Mary Jo Uphoff (Social-Democratic) 0.5% |
| Wisconsin 3 | William H. Stevenson | Republican | 1940 | Incumbent lost renomination. Republican hold. | ▌ ✓ Gardner R. Withrow (Republican) 69.2%; ▌Frank J. Antoine (Democratic) 30.4%; ▌Clarence J. Habelman (Social-Democratic) 0.4% |
| Wisconsin 4 | John C. Brophy | Republican | 1946 | Incumbent lost re-election. Democratic gain. | ▌ ✓ Clement J. Zablocki (Democratic) 55.9%; ▌John C. Brophy (Republican) 39.5%; ▌Edmund V. Bobrowicz (Progressive) 3.2%; ▌Clement Stachowiak (Social-Democratic) 1.5% |
| Wisconsin 5 | Charles J. Kersten | Republican | 1946 | Incumbent lost re-election. Democratic gain. | ▌ ✓ Andrew Biemiller (Democratic) 53.1%; ▌Charles J. Kersten (Republican) 44.8%; ▌Edwin W. Knappe (Social-Democratic) 2.1% |
| Wisconsin 6 | Frank B. Keefe | Republican | 1938 | Incumbent re-elected. | ▌ ✓ Frank B. Keefe (Republican) 55.5%; ▌Kenneth Kunde (Democratic) 43.8%; ▌Rudolph Renn (Social-Democratic) 0.7% |
| Wisconsin 7 | Reid F. Murray | Republican | 1938 | Incumbent re-elected. | ▌ ✓ Reid F. Murray (Republican) 62.5%; ▌Ralph E. Kronenwetter (Democratic) 36.1%; Others: ▌Emil Muelver (Progressive) 0.9%; ▌John A. Pearson Jr. (Social-Democratic) 0.4% |
| Wisconsin 8 | John W. Byrnes | Republican | 1944 | Incumbent re-elected. | ▌ ✓ John W. Byrnes (Republican) 56.6%; ▌Martin J. Young (Democratic) 42.7%; Others: ▌Oliver Rasmussen (Progressive) 0.5%; ▌Lee M. Schaal (Social-Democratic) 0.2% |
| Wisconsin 9 | Merlin Hull | Republican | 1934 | Incumbent re-elected. | ▌ ✓ Merlin Hull (Republican) 98.1%; ▌Linton Jahr (Progressive) 1.0%; ▌Howard C. Hendricks (Social-Democratic) 0.9% |
| Wisconsin 10 | Alvin O'Konski | Republican | 1942 | Incumbent re-elected. | ▌ ✓ Alvin O'Konski (Republican) 54.8%; ▌Daniel Hoan (Democratic) 41.6%; ▌Charles N. Polich (Progressive) 3.2%; ▌Adolph F. Kreie (Social-Democratic) 0.5% |

== Wyoming ==
| District | Incumbent | Party | First elected | Result | Candidates |
|---|---|---|---|---|---|
| Wyoming at-large | Frank A. Barrett | Republican | 1942 | Incumbent re-elected. | ▌ ✓ Frank A. Barrett (Republican) 51.5%; ▌L. G. Flannery (Democratic) 48.5% |

== Non-voting delegates ==
=== Alaska Territory ===
| District | Incumbent | | | This race | |
| District | Representative | Party | First elected | Results | Candidates |
|---|---|---|---|---|---|
| Alaska Territory at-large | Bob Bartlett | Democratic | 1944 | Incumbent re-elected. | ▌ ✓ Bob Bartlett (Democratic) 78.5%; ▌R. H. Stock (Republican) 21.5% |

== See also ==
- 1948 United States elections
  - 1948 United States Senate elections
  - 1948 United States presidential election
- 80th United States Congress
- 81st United States Congress
