= Peter A. Quinn =

American politician

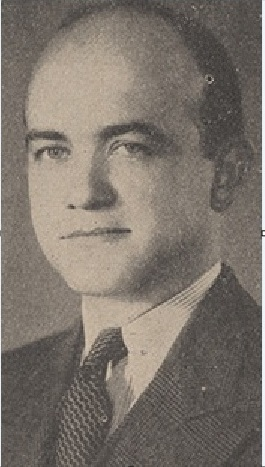
- Quinn as a US representative in 1945

Member of the U.S. House of Representatives from New York's 26th district
- In office January 3, 1945 – January 3, 1947
- Preceded by: Hamilton Fish III
- Succeeded by: David M. Potts

Member of the New York State Assembly from the 6th Bronx County district
- In office January 1, 1936 – December 31, 1944
- Preceded by: Christopher C. McGrath
- Succeeded by: Julius J. Gans

Personal details
- Born: Peter Anthony Quinn; May 10, 1904 New York City, U.S.
- Died: December 23, 1974 (aged 70) New York City, U.S.
- Party: Democratic
- Spouse: Viola Murphy
- Education: Manhattan College (BS); Fordham University (LLB)

Peter Anthony Quinn (May 10, 1904 – December 23, 1974) of New York City was a Democratic U.S. representative from New York from 1945 to 1947. Quinn was a justice of the New York Supreme Court from 1955 to 1974.

== Biography ==
Peter A. Quinn was born in New York City on May 10, 1904. He attended the St. Brigid’s and St. Raymond’s School, and graduated from Manhattan Preparatory School in 1922. He graduated from Manhattan College in 1926; and from Fordham University School of Law in 1929. He was admitted to the bar in 1931, and practiced in New York City.

=== Political career ===
Quinn was a member of the New York State Assembly (Bronx Co., 6th D.) from 1936 to 1944.

==== Congress ====
He was elected as a Democrat to the 79th United States Congress, holding office from January 3, 1945, to January 3, 1947. He ran unsuccessfully for reelection in 1946. After his defeat by Republican candidate David M. Potts, Quinn resumed his law practice.

In January 1949, Quinn became a Judge on New York City's Municipal Court. From 1955 to 1960 he was a Judge on the City Court, and Chief Judge beginning in 1957. In 1960, Quinn was elected a justice of the New York Supreme Court, and remained on the bench until his death.

=== Death ===
Quinn died on December 23, 1974, in the Bronx; and was buried at St. Joseph’s Cemetery in Hackensack, New Jersey.

=== Family ===
His son Peter Quinn is an author whose works include 2007's Looking for Jimmy: A Search for Irish America.

New York State Assembly
| Preceded by Christopher C. McGrath | New York State Assembly; Bronx County, 6th District; 1936–1944 | Succeeded by Julius J. Gans |
U.S. House of Representatives
| Preceded by Hamilton Fish III | Member of the U.S. House of Representatives from New York's 26th congressional district 1945–1947 | Succeeded by David M. Potts |
