= 1946 United States House of Representatives elections in Virginia =

The 1946 United States House of Representatives elections in Virginia were held on November 5, 1946, to determine who will represent the Commonwealth of Virginia in the United States House of Representatives. Virginia had nine seats in the House, apportioned according to the 1940 United States census. Representatives are elected for two-year terms.

== Overview ==
United States House of Representatives elections in Virginia, 1946
Party	Votes	Percentage	Seats	+/–
Democratic	167,919	66.15%	9	-
Republican	81,626	32.15%	0	-
Prohibition	2,012	0.79%	0	-
Socialist	272	0.11%	0	-
Independents/Write-ins	2,035	0.80%	0	-
Totals	253,864	100.00%	9	-

== Results ==
Final results from the Clerk of the House of Representatives:

=== District 1 ===
Virginia's 1st congressional district, 1946
Party	Candidate	Votes	%
Democratic	Schuyler Otis Bland (incumbent)	13,863	75.0
Republican	Walter Johnson	4,628	25.0
n/a	Write-ins	1	0.0
Total votes		18,492	100.0
Democratic hold			

=== District 2 ===
Virginia's 2nd congressional district, 1946
Party	Candidate	Votes	%
Democratic	Porter Hardy Jr. (incumbent)	19,267	65.7
Republican	Sidney H. Kelsey	10,078	34.3
Total votes		29,345	100.0
Democratic hold			

=== District 3 ===
Virginia's 3rd congressional district, 1946
Party	Candidate	Votes	%
Democratic	J. Vaughan Gary (incumbent)	21,947	73.3
Republican	Earle Lutz	7,974	26.7
n/a	Write-ins	2	0.0
Total votes		29,923	100.0
Democratic hold			

=== District 4 ===
Virginia's 4th congressional district, 1946
Party	Candidate	Votes	%
Democratic	Patrick H. Drewry (incumbent)	13,636	87.1
Prohibition	Andrew S. Condrey	2,012	12.9
n/a	Write-ins	2	0.0
Total votes		15,650	100.0
Democratic hold			

=== District 5 ===
Virginia's 5th congressional district, 1946
Party	Candidate	Votes	%
Democratic	Thomas B. Stanley (incumbent)	17,741	73.5
Republican	William L. Creasy	6,390	26.5
Total votes		24,131	100.0
Democratic hold			

=== District 6 ===
Virginia's 6th congressional district, 1946
Party	Candidate	Votes	%
Democratic	J. Lindsay Almond (incumbent)	20,068	64.8
Republican	Frank R. Angell	10,641	34.3
Socialist	Ruby Mae Wilkes	272	0.9
n/a	Write-ins	1	0.0
Total votes		30,982	100.0
Democratic hold			

=== District 7 ===
Virginia's 7th congressional district, 1946
Party	Candidate	Votes	%
Democratic	Burr P. Harrison (incumbent)	19,535	62.3
Republican	Karl Jenkins	11,813	37.7
Total votes		31,348	100.0
Democratic hold			

=== District 8 ===
Virginia's 8th congressional district, 1946
Party	Candidate	Votes	%
Democratic	Howard W. Smith (incumbent)	21,252	62.1
Republican	Lawrence Michael	12,950	37.9
n/a	Write-ins	3	0.0
Total votes		34,205	100.0
Democratic hold			

=== District 9 ===
Virginia's 9th congressional district, 1946
Party	Candidate	Votes	%
Democratic	John W. Flannagan Jr. (incumbent)	20,610	51.8
Republican	S. H. Sutherland	17,152	43.1
Independent	John Albert Goodpasture Jr.	2,026	5.1
Total votes		39,788	100.0
Democratic hold			

== See also ==
- 1946 United States House of Representatives elections
