= Christopher C. McGrath =

American politician

Christopher McGrath
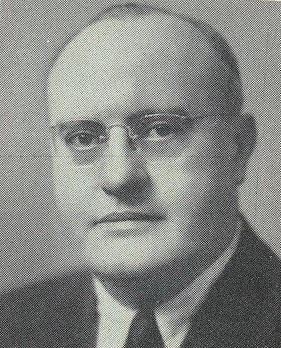

Member of the U.S. House of Representatives from New York's 26th district
- In office January 3, 1949 – January 3, 1953
- Preceded by: David M. Potts
- Succeeded by: Ralph A. Gamble

Personal details
- Born: Christopher Columbus McGrath; May 15, 1902 New York City, US
- Died: July 7, 1986 (aged 84) New York City, US
- Resting place: Gate of Heaven Cemetery in Hawthorne, New York
- Party: Democratic Party
- Education: Fordham University School of Law

Christopher Columbus McGrath (May 15, 1902 – July 7, 1986) was an American lawyer and politician from New York. From 1949 to 1953, he served two terms in the U.S. House of Representatives.

== Early life and education ==
McGrath was born in New York City. He graduated from Clason Military Academy in the Bronx in 1921 and from Fordham University School of Law in 1924. He was admitted to the bar in 1927, and commenced the practice of law in New York City.

== Political career ==
He was a member of the New York State Assembly (Bronx Co., 6th D.) from 1928 through 1935.

He was elected as a municipal judge of New York City in 1935, was re-elected in 1945, and remained on the bench until his resignation on December 31, 1948.

=== Congress ===
McGrath was elected as a Democrat to the 81st and 82nd United States Congresses, holding office from January 3, 1949, to January 3, 1953.

== Later career and death ==
He was elected Surrogate of Bronx County in 1952, and was re-elected in 1966.

He was a member of faculty of Fordham University School of Law, and was a resident of New York City until his death there in 1986.

He was buried at Gate of Heaven Cemetery in Hawthorne, New York.

New York State Assembly
Preceded by Thomas J. McDonald	New York State Assembly; Bronx County, 6th District; 1928–1935	Succeeded by Peter A. Quinn
U.S. House of Representatives
Preceded by David M. Potts	Member of the U.S. House of Representatives from New York's 26th congressional district 1949–1953	Succeeded by Ralph A. Gamble
