= David M. Potts (politician) =

American politician

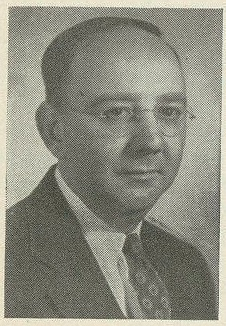

Member of the U.S. House of Representatives from New York's 26th district
- In office January 3, 1947 – January 3, 1949
- Preceded by: Peter A. Quinn
- Succeeded by: Christopher McGrath

Personal details
- Born: David Matthew Potts; March 12, 1906 New York City
- Died: September 11, 1976 (aged 70) Bronxville
- Resting place: Ferncliff Mausoleum, Hartsdale
- Party: Republican
- Education: College of the City of New York; St. Lawrence University

David Matthew Potts (March 12, 1906 – September 11, 1976) was an American lawyer and politician who served one term as a Republican member of the United States House of Representatives from New York from 1947 to 1949.

== Biography ==
Born in New York City, he attended the public schools and the College of the City of New York from 1927 to 1929. He graduated from Brooklyn Law School of St. Lawrence University in 1932, was admitted to the New York bar in 1933 and commenced practice in New York City.

=== Career ===
He was counsel to the New York Senate Committee on Affairs of the City of New York during the 1945 session,

==== Congress ====
The endorsement of the Bronx Republican organization insured the House nomination for Potts in 1946, and the falling out of the more liberal parties ensured the election. The Democratic incumbent, Representative Peter A. Quinn, had been elected in 1944 with American Labor Party support. Now the Laborites ran their own candidate as did the new Liberal Party. Potts won with 44% of the vote. He served in the Eightieth Congress, holding office from January 3, 1947, to January 3, 1949. In 1948, while Laborites continued to nominate their own candidate, both Democrats and Liberals chose the same fresh opponent. Potts's vote dropped ten points and he was defeated by Democratic Party candidate Christopher McGrath. Potts was not designated by the Party in 1950. His two years in the House produced one public enactment, this about Panama Canal builders, but he was often on the floor as an objector (designated by his party to monitor bills under suspension of the rules).

=== Later career and death ===
He resumed the practice of law.

Potts was appointed surrogate of Bronx County by Governor Dewey and held that office from November 1951 to January 1953. He was a special referee of the Appellate Division, First Department, Supreme Court of State of New York during the June 1953 term and was a senior partner of Kadel, Wilson & Potts, until his death in 1976 in Bronxville.

Interment was in Ferncliff Mausoleum, Hartsdale.

U.S. House of Representatives
Preceded by Peter A. Quinn	Member of the U.S. House of Representatives from New York's 26th congressional district 1947–1949	Succeeded by Christopher C. McGrath
