= 1946 United States House of Representatives election in New Mexico =

1946 United States House of Representatives elections in New Mexico
- November 5, 1946
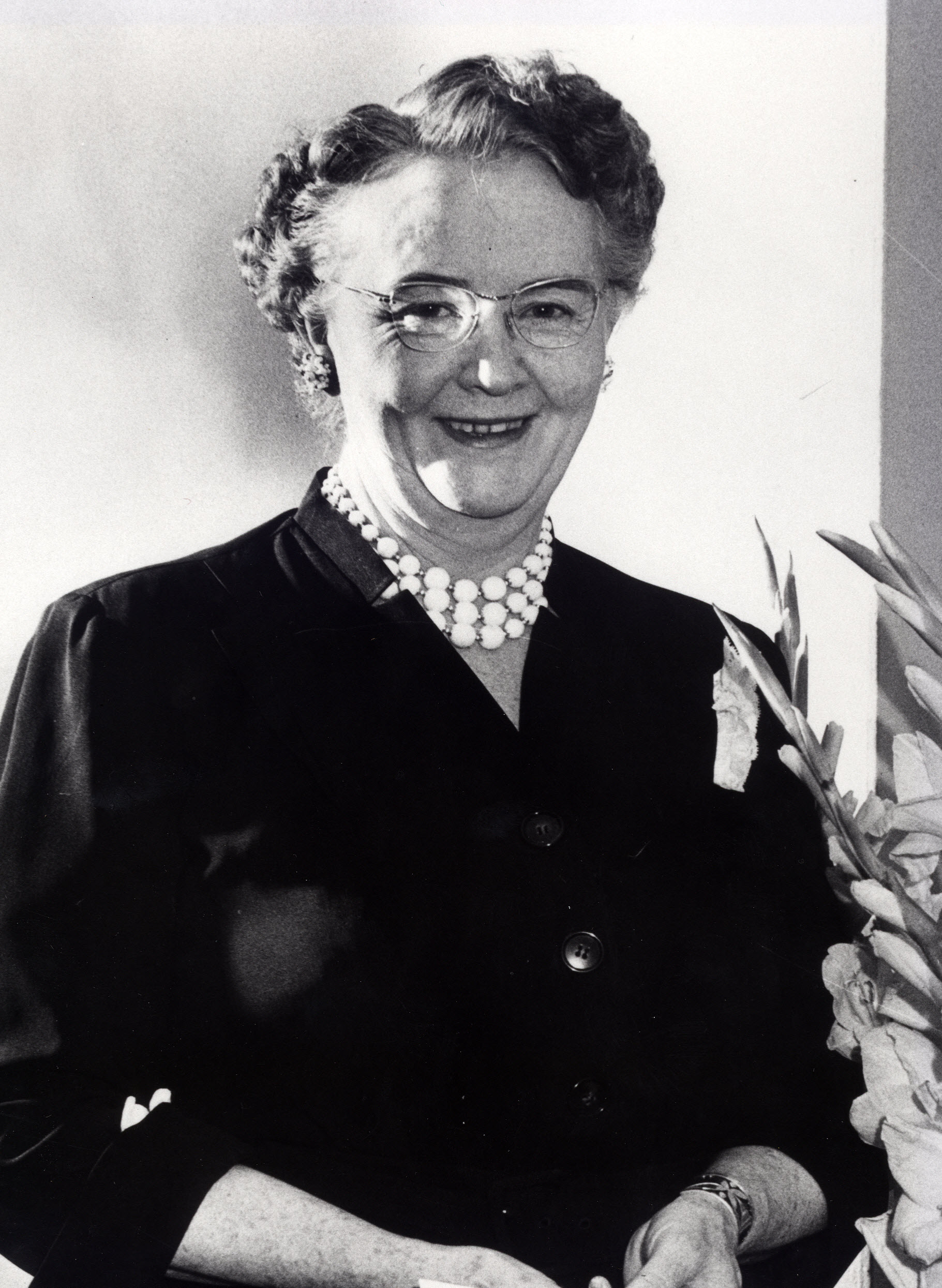

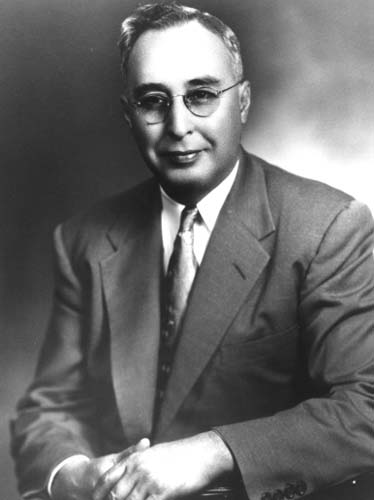

Nominee	Georgia Lee Lusk	Antonio M. Fernández
Party	Democratic	Democratic
Popular vote	66,420	65,242
Percentage	26.4%	26.0%
Nominee	Earl Douglas	Herman G. Baca
Party	Republican	Republican
Popular vote	60,519	58,938
Percentage	24.1%	23.5%

The 1946 United States House of Representatives election in New Mexico was held on Tuesday November 5, 1946 to elect the states two at-large representatives. Due to the 1940 Census New Mexico has 2 representatives, both elected at-large. Incumbent Democrat Clinton Anderson resigned to become United States Secretary of Agriculture.

== Overview ==
United States House of Representatives elections in New Mexico, 1946
Party	Votes	Percentage	Seats	+/–
Democratic	131,662	52.43%	2	-
Republican	119,457	47.57%	0	—
Totals	251,119	100.00%	2	—

=== Results ===
New Mexico At-large congressional district election, 1944
Party	Candidate	Votes	%
Democratic	Georgia Lee Lusk	66,420	28.52
Democratic	Antonio M. Fernández (Incumbent)	65,242	27.01
Republican	Earl Douglas	60,519	22.29
Republican	Herman G. Baca	58,938	22.18
Total votes		251,119	100.00
