= Pennsylvania's 22nd congressional district =

Former U.S. House district in Pennsylvania

Coordinates: 40°00′N 79°40′W

- Obsolete district
- Created: 1830
- Eliminated: 1990
- Years active: 1833-1993

Pennsylvania's 22nd congressional district was one of Pennsylvania's districts of the United States House of Representatives.

== Geography ==
Created in 1833, the district served portions of the city of Pittsburgh. In 1843, the district moved to northwest Pennsylvania. In 1853, the district returned to Pittsburgh. In 1903, the district included many of the counties around Pittsburgh. In 1923, the district was moved to York.

== History ==
This district was created in 1833. The district was eliminated in 1993.

== List of members representing the district ==
Representative	Party	Years	Cong ress	Electoral history
District established March 4, 1833
Harmar Denny (Pittsburgh)	Anti-Masonic	March 4, 1833 – March 3, 1837	23rd 24th	Redistricted from the 16th district and re-elected in 1832. Re-elected in 1834. Retired.
Richard Biddle (Tarentum)	Anti-Masonic	March 4, 1837 – July 21, 1840	25th 26th	Elected in 1836. Re-elected in 1838. Resigned.
Vacant		July 21, 1840 – October 13, 1840	26th	
Henry Marie Brackenridge (Pittsburgh)	Whig	October 13, 1840 – March 3, 1841	26th	Elected to finish Biddle's term. Lost renomination.
William W. Irwin (Pittsburgh)	Whig	March 4, 1841 – March 3, 1843	27th	Elected in 1840. Retired.
Samuel Hays (Franklin)	Democratic	March 4, 1843 – March 3, 1845	28th	Elected in 1843. Retired.
William Swan Garvin (Mercer)	Democratic	March 4, 1845 – March 3, 1847	29th	Elected in 1844. [data missing]
John Wilson Farrelly (Meadville)	Whig	March 4, 1847 – March 3, 1849	30th	Elected in 1846. Retired.
John W. Howe (Allegheny City)	Free Soil	March 4, 1849 – March 3, 1851	31st 32nd	Elected in 1848. Re-elected in 1850. [data missing]
John W. Howe (Allegheny City)	Whig	March 4, 1851 – March 3, 1853	31st 32nd	Elected in 1848. Re-elected in 1850. [data missing]
Thomas M. Howe (Allegheny City)	Whig	March 4, 1853 – March 3, 1855	33rd	Redistricted from the 21st district and re-elected in 1852. Retired.
Samuel A. Purviance (Butler)	Opposition	March 4, 1855 – March 3, 1857	34th 35th	Elected in 1854. Re-elected in 1856. Lost renomination.
Samuel A. Purviance (Butler)	Republican	March 4, 1857 – March 3, 1859	34th 35th	Elected in 1854. Re-elected in 1856. Lost renomination.
Robert McKnight (Pittsburgh)	Republican	March 4, 1859 – March 3, 1863	36th 37th	Elected in 1858. Re-elected in 1860. [data missing]
James K. Moorhead (Pittsburgh)	Republican	March 4, 1863 – March 3, 1869	38th 39th 40th	Redistricted from the 21st district and re-elected in 1862. Re-elected in 1864. Re-elected in 1866. [data missing]
James S. Negley (Pittsburgh)	Republican	March 4, 1869 – March 3, 1875	41st 42nd 43rd	Elected in 1868. Re-elected in 1870. Re-elected in 1872. Lost re-election.
James H. Hopkins (Pittsburgh)	Democratic	March 4, 1875 – March 3, 1877	44th	Elected in 1874. Lost re-election.
Russell Errett (Pittsburgh)	Republican	March 4, 1877 – March 3, 1883	45th 46th 47th	Elected in 1876. Re-elected in 1878. Re-elected in 1880. Lost re-election.
James H. Hopkins (Pittsburgh)	Democratic	March 4, 1883 – March 3, 1885	48th	Elected in 1882. Lost re-election.
James S. Negley (Pittsburgh)	Republican	March 4, 1885 – March 3, 1887	49th	Elected in 1884. Lost re-election.
John Dalzell (Pittsburgh)	Republican	March 4, 1887 – March 3, 1903	50th 51st 52nd 53rd 54th 55th 56th 57th	Elected in 1886. Re-elected in 1888. Re-elected in 1890. Re-elected in 1892. Re-elected in 1894. Re-elected in 1896. Re-elected in 1898. Re-elected in 1900. Redistricted to the 30th district.
George F. Huff (Greensburg)	Republican	March 4, 1903 – March 3, 1911	58th 59th 60th 61st	Elected in 1902. Re-elected in 1904. Re-elected in 1906. Re-elected in 1908. Retired.
Curtis H. Gregg (Greensburg)	Democratic	March 4, 1911 – March 3, 1913	62nd	Elected in 1910. Lost renomination.
Abraham L. Keister (Scottdale)	Republican	March 4, 1913 – March 3, 1917	63rd 64th	Elected in 1912. Re-elected in 1914. Lost renomination.
Edward E. Robbins (Greensburg)	Republican	March 4, 1917 – January 25, 1919	65th	Elected in 1916. Re-elected in 1918 but died before the term began.
Vacant		January 25, 1919 – March 3, 1919	65th	
John H. Wilson (Butler)	Democratic	March 4, 1919 – March 3, 1921	66th	Elected to finish Robbins's term. Lost re-election.
Adam M. Wyant (Greensburg)	Republican	March 4, 1921 – March 3, 1923	67th	Elected in 1920. Redistricted to the 31st district.
Samuel F. Glatfelter (York)	Democratic	March 4, 1923 – March 3, 1925	68th	Elected in 1922. Lost re-election.
Franklin Menges (York)	Republican	March 4, 1925 – March 3, 1931	69th 70th 71st	Elected in 1924. Re-elected in 1926. Re-elected in 1928. Lost re-election.
Harry L. Haines (Red Lion)	Democratic	March 4, 1931 – January 3, 1939	72nd 73rd 74th 75th	Elected in 1930. Re-elected in 1932. Re-elected in 1934. Re-elected in 1936. Lost re-election.
Chester H. Gross (Manchester)	Republican	January 3, 1939 – January 3, 1941	76th	Elected in 1938. Lost re-election.
Harry L. Haines (Red Lion)	Democratic	January 3, 1941 – January 3, 1943	77th	Elected in 1940. Lost re-election.
Chester H. Gross (Manchester)	Republican	January 3, 1943 – January 3, 1945	78th	Redistricted from the 21st district and re-elected in 1942. [data missing]
D. Emmert Brumbaugh (Claysburg)	Republican	January 3, 1945 – January 3, 1947	79th	Redistricted from the 23rd district and re-elected in 1944. Retired.
James E. Van Zandt (Altoona)	Republican	January 3, 1947 – January 3, 1953	80th 81st 82nd	Elected in 1946. Re-elected in 1948. Re-elected in 1950. Redistricted to the 20th district.
John P. Saylor (Johnstown)	Republican	January 3, 1953 – January 3, 1973	83rd 84th 85th 86th 87th 88th 89th 90th 91st 92nd	Redistricted from the 26th district and re-elected in 1952. Re-elected in 1954. Re-elected in 1956. Re-elected in 1958. Re-elected in 1960. Re-elected in 1962. Re-elected in 1964. Re-elected in 1966. Re-elected in 1968. Re-elected in 1970. Redistricted to the 12th district.
Thomas E. Morgan (Fredericktown)	Democratic	January 3, 1973 – January 3, 1977	93rd 94th	Redistricted from the 26th district and re-elected in 1972. Re-elected in 1974. Retired.
Austin Murphy (Monongahela)	Democratic	January 3, 1977 – January 3, 1993	95th 96th 97th 98th 99th 100th 101st 102nd	Elected in 1976. Re-elected in 1978. Re-elected in 1980. Re-elected in 1982. Re-elected in 1984. Re-elected in 1986. Re-elected in 1988. Re-elected in 1990. Redistricted to the 20th district.
District dissolved January 3, 1993
