= Free Soil, Michigan =

- Village
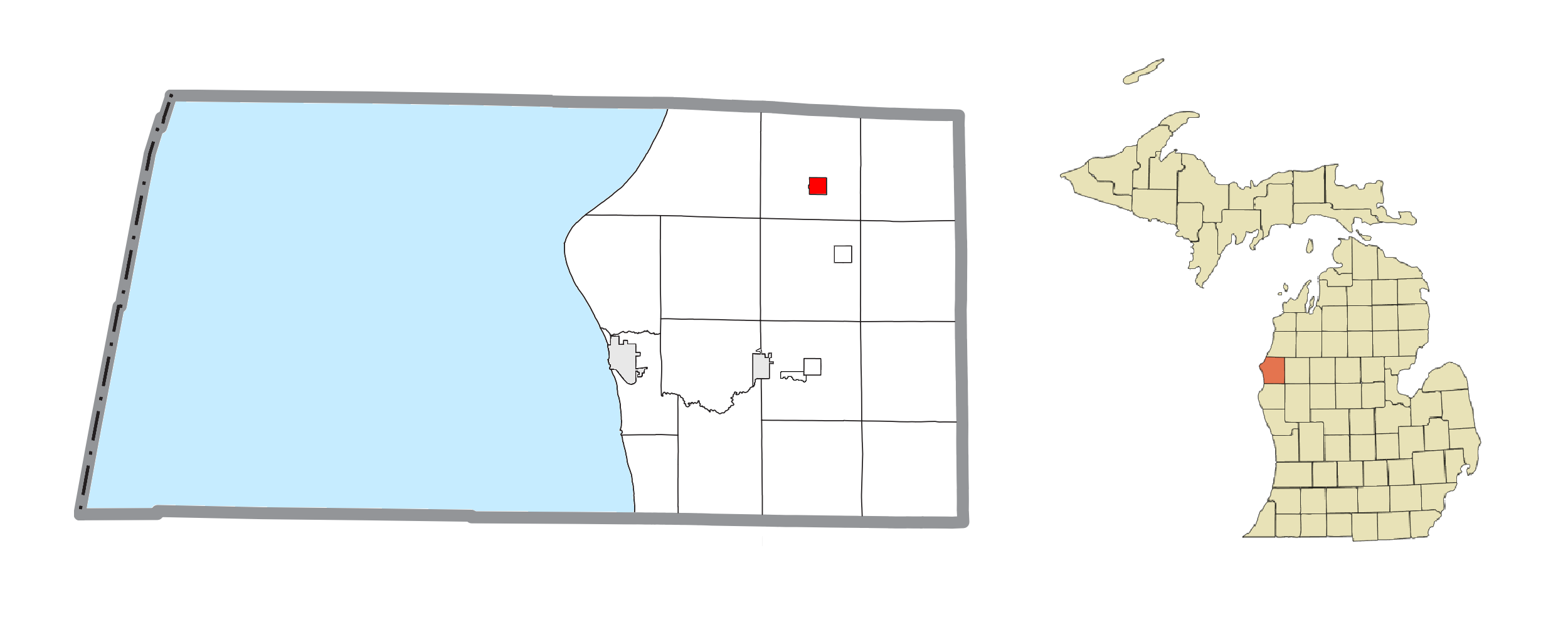
- Location within Mason County

- Location within Michigan Location within the United States
- Coordinates: 44°06′28″N 86°12′57″W
- Country: United States
- State: Michigan
- County: Mason
- Township: Free Soil
- Incorporated: 1912

Area
  - Total: 1.04 sq mi (2.69 km^{2})
  - Land: 1.04 sq mi (2.69 km^{2})
  - Water: 0 sq mi (0.00 km^{2})
- Elevation: 686 ft (209 m)

Population (2020)
  - Total: 158
  - Density: 152.2/sq mi (58.78/km^{2})
- Time zone: UTC-5 (Eastern (EST))
  - Summer (DST): UTC-4 (EDT)
- ZIP Code: 49411
- Area code: 231
- FIPS code: 26-30600
- GNIS feature ID: 1617399

Free Soil is a village in Mason County in the U.S. state of Michigan. The population was 158 at the 2020 census. The village is located within Free Soil Township.

== History ==
The current village is actually the second settlement in Mason County to be named Free Soil. There are still a few homes in the area now known as "Old Freesoil".

The railroad was extended to Free Soil around 1882, and the village was incorporated in 1912. The community derives its name from the Free Soil Party.

== Geography ==
Free Soil is in northern Mason County, 15 miles (24 km) northeast of Ludington, the county seat (20 miles (32 km) by road), and 13 miles (21 km) southeast of Manistee. According to the United States Census Bureau, the village has a total area of 1.04 square miles (2.69 km^{2}), all land. The village is close to the intersection of Free Soil and Custer Roads, and the Big Sable River runs just north of the village limits.

== Demographics ==
Historical population
Census	Pop.	Note	%±
1890	306		—
1920	210		—
1930	239		13.8%
1940	236		−1.3%
1950	208		−11.9%
1960	209		0.5%
1970	186		−11.0%
1980	212		14.0%
1990	148		−30.2%
2000	177		19.6%
2010	144		−18.6%
2020	158		9.7%
U.S. Decennial Census

=== 2010 census ===
As of the census of 2010, there were 144 people, 64 households, and 41 families residing in the village. The population density was 138.5 inhabitants per square mile (53.5/km^{2}). There were 84 housing units at an average density of 80.8 per square mile (31.2/km^{2}). The racial makeup of the village was 95.8% White, 1.4% African American, and 2.8% Native American.

There were 64 households, of which 23.4% had children under the age of 18 living with them, 46.9% were married couples living together, 15.6% had a female householder with no husband present, 1.6% had a male householder with no wife present, and 35.9% were non-families. 31.3% of all households were made up of individuals, and 12.5% had someone living alone who was 65 years of age or older. The average household size was 2.25 and the average family size was 2.76.

The median age in the village was 44.9 years. 20.8% of residents were under the age of 18; 6.5% were between the ages of 18 and 24; 23.7% were from 25 to 44; 28.5% were from 45 to 64; and 20.8% were 65 years of age or older. The gender makeup of the village was 51.4% male and 48.6% female.

=== 2000 census ===
As of the census of 2000, there were 177 people, 75 households, and 48 families residing in the village. The population density was 171.2 inhabitants per square mile (66.1/km^{2}). There were 93 housing units at an average density of 90.0 per square mile (34.7/km^{2}). The racial makeup of the village was 93.22% White, 2.26% African American, 0.56% Native American, and 3.95% from two or more races.

There were 75 households, out of which 25.3% had children under the age of 18 living with them, 53.3% were married couples living together, 6.7% had a female householder with no husband present, and 36.0% were non-families. 36.0% of all households were made up of individuals, and 16.0% had someone living alone who was 65 years of age or older. The average household size was 2.36 and the average family size was 3.02.

In the village, the population was spread out, with 22.6% under the age of 18, 9.6% from 18 to 24, 27.7% from 25 to 44, 22.6% from 45 to 64, and 17.5% who were 65 years of age or older. The median age was 40 years. For every 100 females, there were 98.9 males. For every 100 females age 18 and over, there were 98.6 males.

The median income for a household in the village was $27,083, and the median income for a family was $36,000. Males had a median income of $28,750 versus $20,833 for females. The per capita income for the village was $13,329. About 5.6% of families and 9.8% of the population were below the poverty line, including 9.8% of those under the age of eighteen and 11.4% of those 65 or over.

== Education ==
Free Soil previously operated a two-building K-12 school district, with the high school closing in 2007 and elementary closing in 2011. The school had been in operation since 1913.
