= John W. Farrelly =

American politician (1809–1860)

Member of the U.S. House of Representatives from Pennsylvania's 22nd district
- In office March 4, 1847 – March 3, 1849
- Preceded by: William Swan Garvin
- Succeeded by: John W. Howe

Member of the Pennsylvania House of Representatives
- In office 1837

Member of the Pennsylvania Senate for the 21st district
- In office 1841-1842

Member of the Pennsylvania Senate for the 26th district
- In office 1843-1844

Personal details
- Born: July 7, 1809 Meadville, Pennsylvania, US
- Died: December 20, 1860 (aged 51) Meadville, Pennsylvania, US
- Party: Whig

John Wilson Farrelly (July 7, 1809 – December 20, 1860) was an American politician from Pennsylvania who served as a Whig member of the U.S. House of Representatives for Pennsylvania's 22nd congressional district from 1847 to 1849.

== Biography ==
John Wilson Farrelly (son of Patrick Farrelly) was born in Meadville, Pennsylvania. He received a limited schooling and graduated from Allegheny College at Meadville in 1826. He studied law, was admitted to the bar in 1828 and commenced practice in Meadville. He served as a member of the Pennsylvania House of Representatives in 1837. He served as a member of the Pennsylvania State Senate for the 21st district from 1841 to 1842 and for the 26th district from 1843 to 1844.

Farrelly was elected as a Whig to the Thirtieth Congress. He served as chairman of the United States House Committee on Patents during the Thirtieth Congress. He was not a candidate for renomination in 1848. He was appointed Sixth Auditor of the Treasury by President Zachary Taylor and served from November 5, 1849, until April 9, 1853, when he resigned. He engaged in the practice of law in Meadville until his death in 1860.

== Sources ==
- United States Congress. "John W. Farrelly (id: F000031)". Biographical Directory of the United States Congress.
- The Political Graveyard

Pennsylvania House of Representatives
Preceded by	Member of the Pennsylvania House of Representatives; 1837	Succeeded by
Pennsylvania State Senate
Preceded by Joseph M. Sterrett	Member of the Pennsylvania Senate, 21st district 1841-1842	Succeeded by John Hill
Preceded by	Member of the Pennsylvania Senate, 26th district 1843-1844	Succeeded by
U.S. House of Representatives
Preceded by William S. Garvin	Member of the U.S. House of Representatives from Pennsylvania's 22nd congressional district 1847 - 1849	Succeeded by John W. Howe
