= Free Soil Township, Michigan =

- Civil township
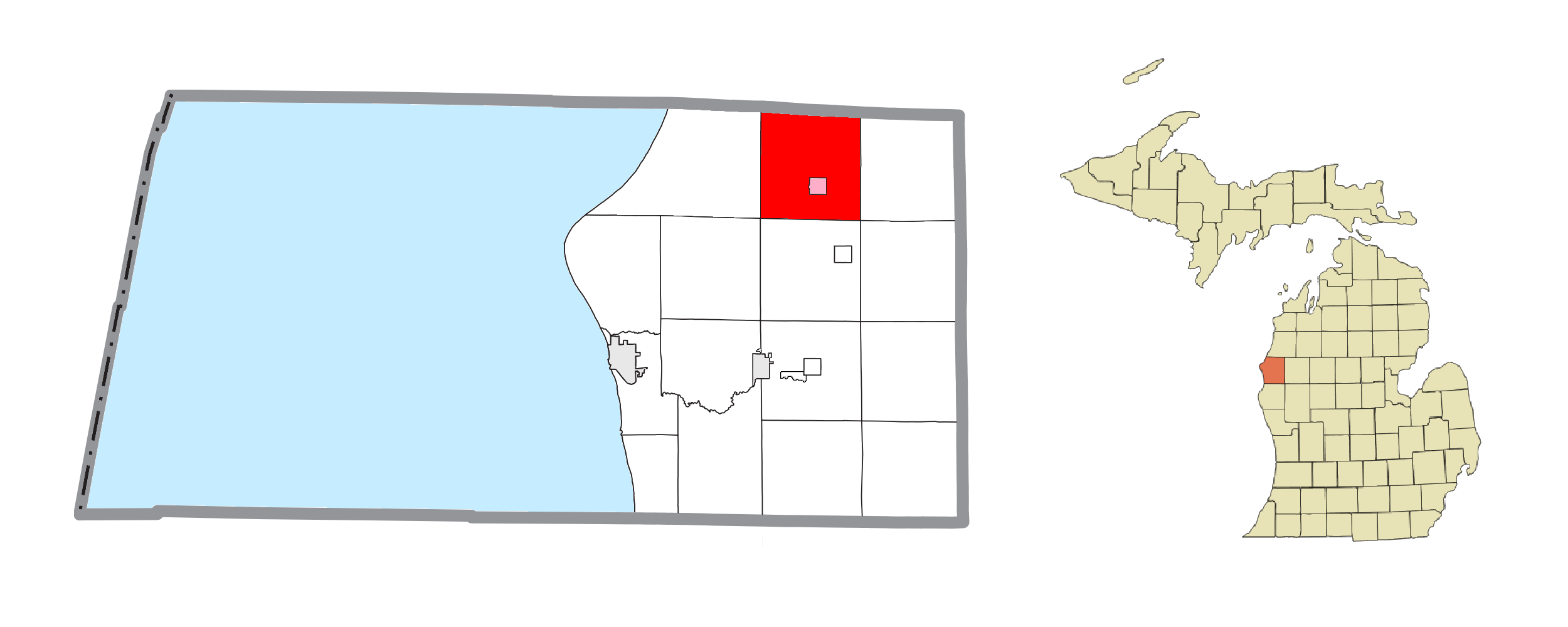
- Location within Mason County (red) and the administered village of Free Soil (pink)

- Location within Michigan Location within the United States
- Coordinates: 44°07′11″N 86°13′15″W
- Country: United States
- State: Michigan
- County: Mason
- Organized: 1848

Government
  - Supervisor: Gregg Surma
  - Clerk: Lynda Papes

Area
  - Total: 39.06 sq mi (101.2 km^{2})
  - Land: 38.64 sq mi (100.1 km^{2})
  - Water: 0.42 sq mi (1.1 km^{2})
- Elevation: 690 ft (210 m)

Population (2020)
  - Total: 842
  - Density: 21.8/sq mi (8.4/km^{2})
- Time zone: UTC-5 (Eastern (EST))
  - Summer (DST): UTC-4 (EDT)
- ZIP Code: 49411 (Free Soil)
- Area code: 231
- FIPS code: 26-105-30620
- GNIS feature ID: 1626315
- Website: freesoiltownship.org

Free Soil Township is a civil township of Mason County in the U.S. state of Michigan. The population was 842 at the 2020 census. The village of Free Soil is located within the township.

Free Soil Township was named in 1848 after the Free Soil Party.

== Geography ==
The township is in northern Mason County and is bordered to the north by Manistee County. The village of Free Soil is in the south-central part of the township, and U.S. Route 31 runs north-south along the township's western border. According to the U.S. Census Bureau, the township has a total area of 39.06 square miles (101.16 km^{2}), of which 38.64 square miles (100.08 km^{2}) are land and 0.42 square miles (1.09 km^{2}), or 1.08%, are water. The Big Sable River flows east to west across the center of the township, passing north of the village of Free Soil.

== Demographics ==
As of the census of 2000, there were 809 people, 335 households, and 233 families residing in the township. The population density was 20.9 inhabitants per square mile (8.1/km^{2}). There were 552 housing units at an average density of 14.3 per square mile (5.5/km^{2}). The racial makeup of the township was 96.91% White, 0.74% African American, 0.49% Native American, 0.25% Asian, 0.49% from other races, and 1.11% from two or more races. Hispanic or Latino of any race were 1.11% of the population.

There were 335 households, out of which 27.8% had children under the age of 18 living with them, 60.9% were married couples living together, 5.4% had a female householder with no husband present, and 30.4% were non-families. 27.8% of all households were made up of individuals, and 13.4% had someone living alone who was 65 years of age or older. The average household size was 2.41 and the average family size was 2.93.

In the township the population was spread out, with 23.2% under the age of 18, 5.7% from 18 to 24, 25.2% from 25 to 44, 28.6% from 45 to 64, and 17.3% who were 65 years of age or older. The median age was 42 years. For every 100 females, there were 104.8 males. For every 100 females age 18 and over, there were 101.6 males.

The median income for a household in the township was $34,375, and the median income for a family was $40,795. Males had a median income of $37,000 versus $20,417 for females. The per capita income for the township was $15,318. About 4.8% of families and 8.0% of the population were below the poverty line, including 8.3% of those under age 18 and 9.0% of those age 65 or over.
