= Francis E. Walter =

American politician (1894–1963)

Francis Walter
- Walter as a congressman in 1939

Member of the U.S. House of Representatives from Pennsylvania
- In office March 4, 1933 – May 31, 1963
- Preceded by: J. Banks Kurtz
- Succeeded by: Fred B. Rooney
- Constituency: 21st district (1933–1945); 20th district (1945–1953); 15th district (1953–1963)

Personal details
- Born: Francis Eugene Walter; May 26, 1894 Easton, Pennsylvania, U.S.
- Died: May 31, 1963 (aged 69) Washington, D.C., U.S.
- Resting place: Arlington National Cemetery
- Party: Democratic
- Education: Lehigh University (attended); George Washington University (attended); Georgetown University (attended)

Francis Eugene Walter (May 26, 1894 – May 31, 1963) was a Democratic member of the U.S. House of Representatives from Pennsylvania. He was a member of the House Un-American Activities Committee from 1951 to 1963, serving as chair of that committee for the last nine of those years. He wanted to minimize immigration and was largely responsible for the McCarran–Walter Act of 1952, which kept the old quotas but also opened up many new opportunities for legal immigration to the United States.

== Background ==
Francis E. Walter was born in Easton, Pennsylvania. He attended Lehigh University, George Washington University and Georgetown University.

== Career ==
During both World Wars I and II, Walter was in the air service of the United States Navy. He was the director of the Broad Street Trust Company in Philadelphia, Pennsylvania, and of the Easton National Bank in Easton. From 1928 to 1933 he was the Solicitor of Northampton County, Pennsylvania. He was a delegate to the 1928 Democratic National Convention. He was elected as a Democrat to the 73rd United States Congress and served until his death in Washington, D.C. In 1947–8, he served on the Herter Committee.

Walter is best known for the McCarran-Walter Act, passed over President Truman's veto in 1952, which, while it opened naturalization to Asian immigrants for the first time, continued the immigration quota system based on national origin introduced in 1924, and allowed the U.S. government to deport and/or bar from re-entry those identified as subversives, particularly members and former members of the Communist Party. In 1944, he presented President Roosevelt with a letter opener made of an arm bone of a fallen Japanese soldier. Roosevelt later returned it and asked that it be given a proper burial.

Walter's views were regarded by some as "reactionary and racist" and this was highlighted in his exchanges with Paul Robeson's HUAC meeting. A staunch anti-Communist, he served as chairman of the House Un-American Activities Committee during the 84th through 88th Congresses. Walter also served as a director of the Pioneer Fund, a foundation best known for its advocacy of IQ variation among races.

Walter appeared in a central role in the 1960s-era U.S. government anti-Communist propaganda film Operation Abolition. Historical footage of Walter also appears in the 1990 documentary film Berkeley in the Sixties.

== Death ==
Walter died in 1963, aged 69, from leukemia and was interred at Arlington National Cemetery.

== See also ==
- List of members of the United States Congress who died in office (1950–1999)
- List of members of the House Un-American Activities Committee

== Footnotes ==
U.S. House of Representatives
Preceded by J. Banks Kurtz	Member of the U.S. House of Representatives from Pennsylvania's 21st congressional district 1933–1945	Succeeded by Chester H. Gross
Preceded by Leon H. Gavin	Member of the U.S. House of Representatives from Pennsylvania's 20th congressional district 1945–1953	Succeeded by James E. Van Zandt
Preceded by Alvin Bush	Member of the U.S. House of Representatives from Pennsylvania's 15th congressional district 1953–1963	Succeeded by Fred B. Rooney
