= J. Banks Kurtz =

American politician

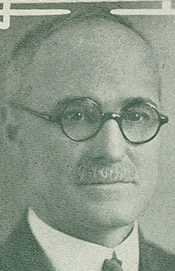

Member of the U.S. House of Representatives from Pennsylvania
- In office March 4, 1923 – January 3, 1935
- Preceded by: Evan J. Jones (21st); J. Mitchell Chase (23rd)
- Succeeded by: Francis E. Walter (21st); Don Gingery (23rd)
- Constituency: 21st district (1923-33); 23rd district (1933-35)

Personal details
- Born: October 31, 1867 Delaware Township, Pennsylvania
- Died: September 18, 1960 (aged 92) Altoona, Pennsylvania
- Party: Republican
- Education: Dickinson College; Dickinson School of Law

Jacob Banks Kurtz (October 31, 1867 – September 18, 1960) was a Republican member of the U.S. House of Representatives from Pennsylvania.

== Biography ==
J. Banks Kurtz was born in Delaware Township, Juniata County, Pennsylvania. He graduated from Dickinson College in Carlisle, Pennsylvania, and from Dickinson School of Law in 1893. While at school, Kurtz was a member of the Union Philosophical Society as well as the Phi Delta Theta and Delta Chi fraternities. He was admitted to the bar and commenced practice in Altoona, Pennsylvania. He served as district attorney of Blair County, Pennsylvania from 1905 to 1912. He was chairman of the committee of public safety and council of national defense for Blair County during the First World War.

Kurtz was elected as a Republican to the sixty-eighth United States Congress and to the five succeeding Congresses. He represented Pennsylvania's 21st congressional district (first 5 terms) and 23rd congressional district (final term). He was an unsuccessful candidate for reelection in 1934. He resumed the practice of law, and was a delegate to the Republican National Conventions in 1936, 1940, and 1948. He served as city solicitor of Altoona from 1944 to 1946. He died in Altoona, with interment in Alto Reste Burial Park.

== Personal life ==
In September 1895, Kurtz married Jennie Stockton and they had a daughter, Dorothy. J. Banks Kurtz.

== Sources ==
- United States Congress. "J. Banks Kurtz (id: K000344)". Biographical Directory of the United States Congress.
- The Political Graveyard

U.S. House of Representatives
Preceded by Evan J. Jones	Member of the U.S. House of Representatives from Pennsylvania's 21st congressional district 1923–1933	Succeeded by Francis E. Walter
Preceded by J. Mitchell Chase	Member of the U.S. House of Representatives from Pennsylvania's 23rd congressional district 1933–1935	Succeeded by Don Gingery
