= 1840 Pennsylvania's 22nd congressional district special election =

On October 13, 1840, the same day as the general elections for the 27th Congress, a special election was held in Pennsylvania's 22nd congressional district to fill a vacancy caused by the resignation of Richard Biddle (AM).

== Election results ==
Candidate	Party	Votes	Percent
Henry M. Brackenridge	Whig	6,858	61.5%
William Wilkins	Democratic	4,297	38.5%

Brackenridge took office on December 10, 1840.

== See also ==
- List of special elections to the United States House of Representatives
