= Evan John Jones (politician) =

American politician (1872–1952)

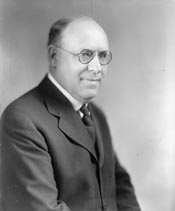

Member of the U.S. House of Representatives from Pennsylvania's 21st district
- In office March 4, 1919 – March 3, 1923
- Preceded by: Charles H. Rowland
- Succeeded by: Jacob B. Kurtz

Personal details
- Born: October 23, 1872 Shamokin, Pennsylvania
- Died: January 9, 1952 (aged 79) Bradford, Pennsylvania
- Party: Republican Party
- Education: Clarion Normal School; Dickinson School of Law
- Occupation: Attorney

Evan John Jones (October 23, 1872 – January 9, 1952) was a Republican member of the U.S. House of Representatives from Pennsylvania.

== Biography ==
Jones was born in Shamokin, Pennsylvania. He graduated from Clarion Normal School in Clarion, Pennsylvania, in 1892. He taught school. He graduated from the Dickinson School of Law in 1896. He was admitted to the bar in 1896 and commenced practice at St. Marys, Pennsylvania.

Jones was elected as a Republican to the Sixty-sixth and Sixty-seventh Congresses. He was an unsuccessful candidate for renomination in 1922. He resumed the practice of law in Bradford, Pennsylvania.

He served as vice president and general manager of the Emporium Forestry Co. and as director and general counsel of the Grasse River Railroad Corp. He died at the age of seventy-nine in Bradford, Pennsylvania, and was buried in the Willow Dale Cemetery.

U.S. House of Representatives
Preceded by Charles H. Rowland	Member of the U.S. House of Representatives from Pennsylvania's 21st congressional district 1919–1923	Succeeded by J. Banks Kurtz
