= Don Hilary Gingery =

American politician

Don H. Gingery
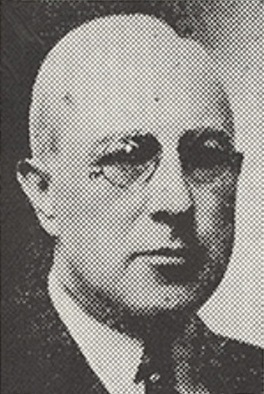

Member of the U.S. House of Representatives from Pennsylvania's 23rd district
- In office January 3, 1935 – January 3, 1939
- Preceded by: Jacob Banks Kurtz
- Succeeded by: James E. Van Zandt

Personal details
- Born: February 19, 1884 Woodland, Pennsylvania
- Died: October 15, 1961 (aged 77) Clearfield, Pennsylvania
- Party: Democratic
- Education: Ohio Northern University

Don Hilary Gingery (February 19, 1884 – October 15, 1961) was a Democratic member of the U.S. House of Representatives from Pennsylvania.

== Biography ==
Don Gingery was born in Woodland, Pennsylvania, and moved to Clearfield, Pennsylvania, in 1892. He attended the Mercersburg Academy, and the Ohio Northern University at Ada, Ohio. He was engaged in the hardware and mine-supply business from 1902 to 1934, and also as a civil engineer in 1903. Gingery was a member of the Pennsylvania State House of Representatives in 1915 and 1916. He served in the Pennsylvania National Guard, in grades from private to captain from 1902 to 1906. He was chairman of the Clearfield County, Pennsylvania, Democratic committee in 1916 and 1917, and a member of the Democratic State committee in 1919 and 1920. He was a member of the official delegation attending the inauguration of President Manuel L. Quezon of the Philippines at Manila, in 1935.

Gingery was elected as a Democrat to the Seventy-fourth and Seventy-fifth Congresses. He was an unsuccessful candidate for reelection in 1938. He was associated with the Bituminous Coal Division of the Coal Mines Administration, and the Solid Fuels Administration for War of the United States Department of the Interior, at Altoona, Pennsylvania, from 1939 to 1946. He was a delegate to 1948 Democratic National Convention from Pennsylvania. He died in Clearfield and is buried in Hillcrest Cemetery.

U.S. House of Representatives
Preceded by J. Banks Kurtz	Member of the U.S. House of Representatives from Pennsylvania's 23rd congressional district 1935–1939	Succeeded by James E. Van Zandt
