= William Swan Garvin =

American politician

Member of the U.S. House of Representatives from Pennsylvania's 22nd district
- In office March 4, 1845 – March 3, 1847
- Preceded by: Samuel Hays
- Succeeded by: John Wilson Farrelly

Personal details
- Born: July 25, 1806 Mercer, Pennsylvania
- Died: February 20, 1883 (aged 76)
- Resting place: Mercer Citizens’ Cemetery, Mercer, Pennsylvania
- Party: Jacksonian
- Other political affiliations: Democratic
- Occupation: Newspaper proprietor, postmaster, flour inspector
- Committees: House Committee on Expenditures on Public Buildings

William Swan Garvin (July 25, 1806 – February 20, 1883) was a western Pennsylvania newspaper proprietor who is most widely known for his term as a Jacksonian and Democratic member of the U.S. House of Representatives.

== Early years ==
Garvin was born in Mercer, Pennsylvania on July 25, 1806. At the age of thirteen, he became an apprentice for Mercer County's Western Press, a Democratic newspaper.

== Career ==
After a time as a wandering journeyman printer, he returned to the Western Press as its proprietor in 1830. He held that position off and on for the rest of his life.

Garvin was postmaster of Mercer from 1837 to 1841.

Garvin was elected as a Democrat to the Twenty-ninth Congress. He served as chairman of the United States House Committee on Expenditures on Public Buildings during that session.

He also served as a flour inspector in Pittsburgh during the early 1850s, and was again appointed postmaster of Mercer in 1867 and served until 1869.

== Death and interment ==
Garvin died on February 20, 1883, and was buried in the Mercer Citizens’ Cemetery.

U.S. House of Representatives
Preceded by Samuel Hays	Member of the U.S. House of Representatives from Pennsylvania's 22nd congressional district 1845 - 1847	Succeeded by John W. Farrelly
