= Harry L. Haines =

American politician

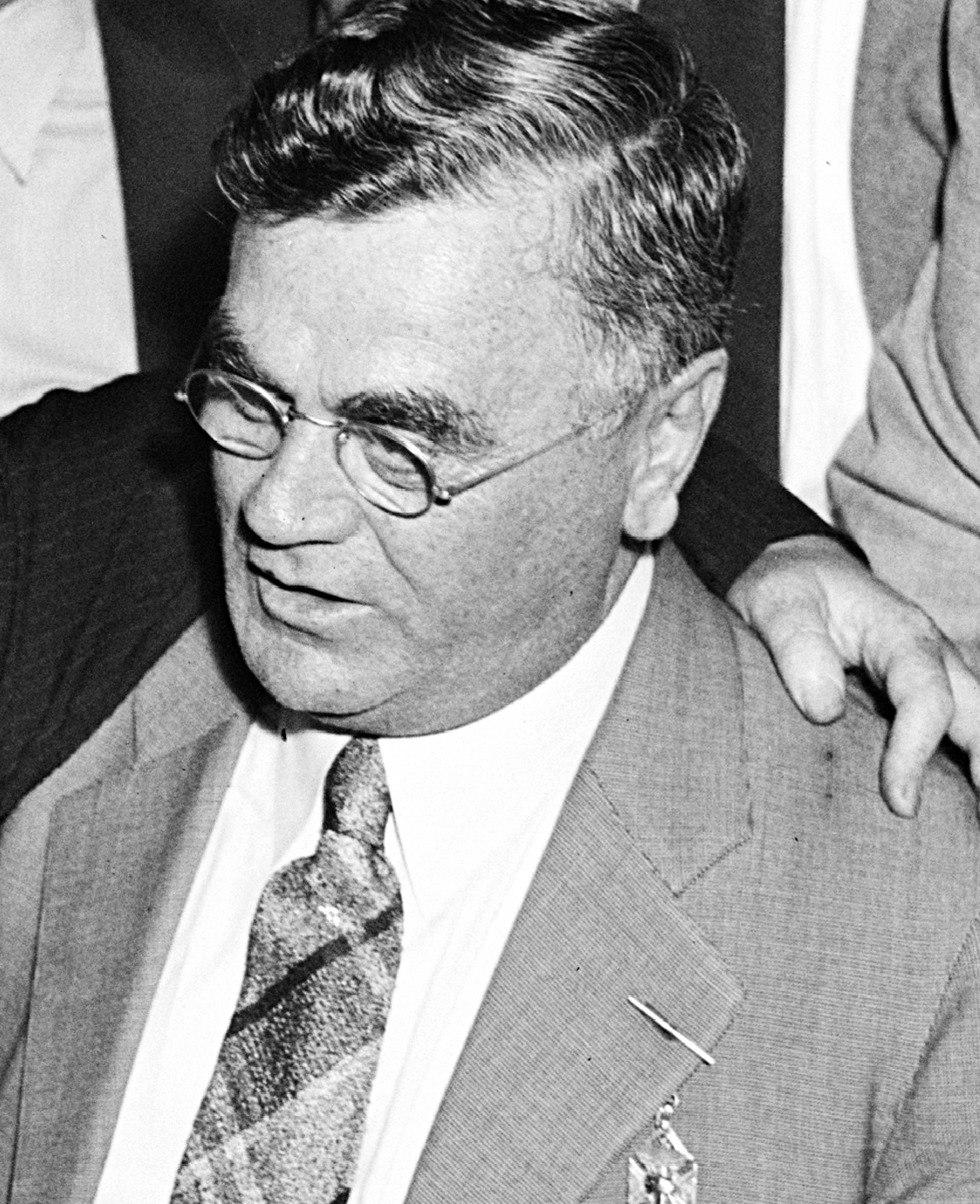
- Haines in August 1935

Member of the U.S. House of Representatives from Pennsylvania's 22nd district
- In office January 3, 1941 – January 3, 1943
- Preceded by: Chester H. Gross
- Succeeded by: Chester H. Gross
- In office March 4, 1931 – January 3, 1939
- Preceded by: Franklin Menges
- Succeeded by: Chester H. Gross

Personal details
- Born: February 1, 1880 Red Lion, Pennsylvania
- Died: March 29, 1947 (aged 67) Red Lion, Pennsylvania
- Resting place: Red Lion Cemetery
- Party: Democratic

Harry Luther Haines (February 1, 1880 in Red Lion, Pennsylvania – March 29, 1947) was an American businessman who served five terms as a Democratic member of the U.S. House of Representatives from Pennsylvania from 1931 to 1943.

== Biography ==
Born in Red Lion, Pennsylvania on February 1, 1880, Haines attended the State Normal School in Lock Haven, Pennsylvania and Patrick's Business College at York, Pennsylvania.

=== Business career ===
He was engaged in the manufacture and brokerage of cigars from 1906 to 1934, and was a burgess of Red Lion from 1921 to 1930, as well as a delegate to the Democratic State Convention in 1918.

=== Political career ===
Haines was elected as a Democrat to the Seventy-second and to the three succeeding Congresses. He was an unsuccessful candidate for reelection in 1938.

He then served in the office of the Pennsylvania State Treasurer in 1939 and 1940.

He was again elected in 1940 to the Seventy-seventh Congress, but was an unsuccessful candidate for reelection in 1942.

=== After Congress ===
After his time in Congress, he briefly worked as editor of the plant magazine of the York Safe & Lock Co. from 1943 to 1944.

== Death and interment ==
Haines died in Red Lion on March 29, 1947, and was interred in the Red Lion Cemetery.

U.S. House of Representatives
Preceded by Franklin Menges	Member of the U.S. House of Representatives from Pennsylvania's 22nd congressional district 1931–1939	Succeeded by Chester H. Gross
Preceded by Chester H. Gross	Member of the U.S. House of Representatives from Pennsylvania's 22nd congressional district 1941–1943	Succeeded by Chester H. Gross
