= Samuel F. Glatfelter =

American politician

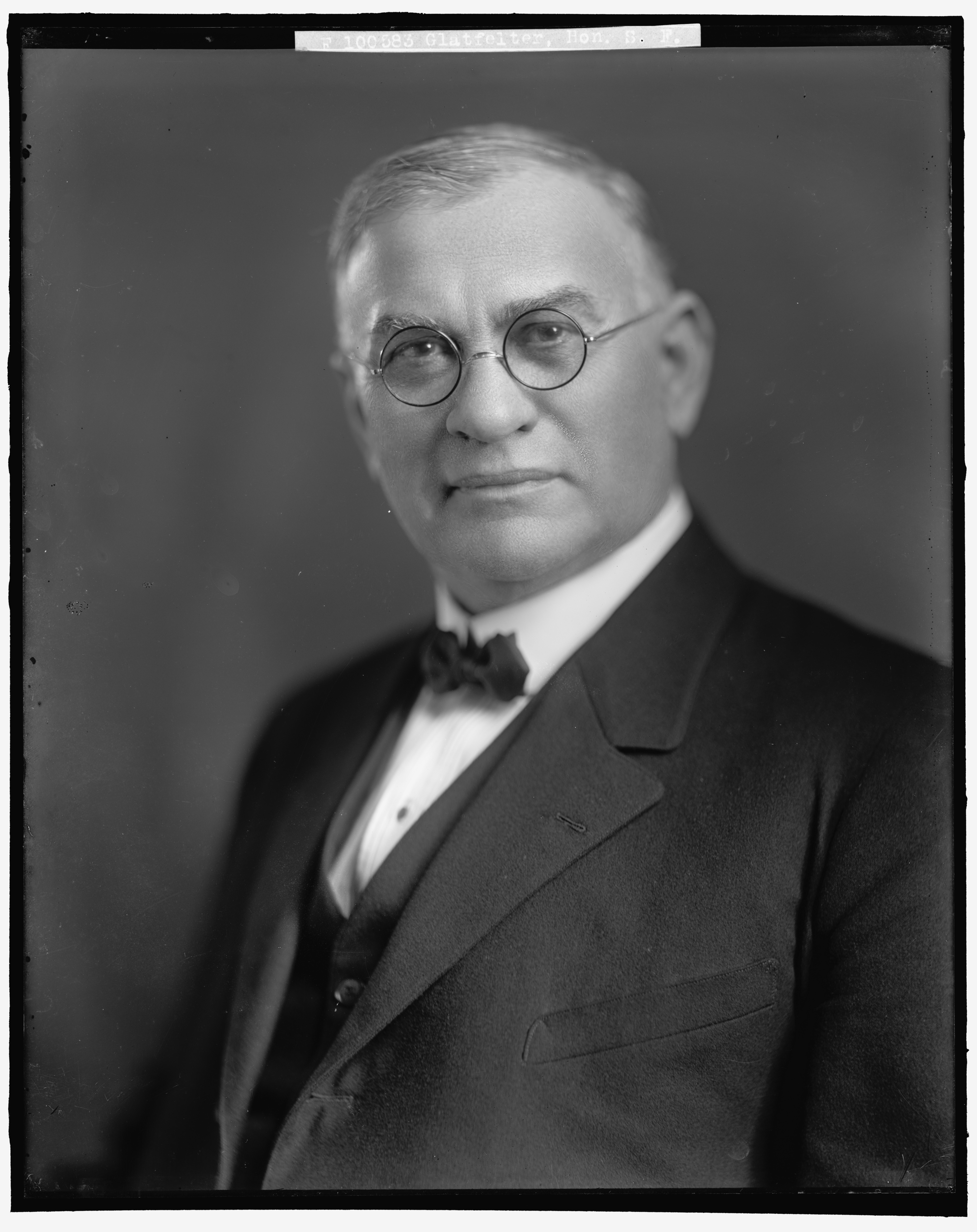
- Harris & Ewing photo, circa 1925

Member of the U.S. House of Representatives from Pennsylvania's 22nd district
- In office March 4, 1923 – March 3, 1925
- Preceded by: Adam Martin Wyant
- Succeeded by: Franklin Menges

Personal details
- Born: Samuel Feiser Glatfelter; April 7, 1858 Loganville, Pennsylvania, U.S.
- Died: April 27, 1927 (aged 69) York, Pennsylvania, U.S.
- Resting place: Prospect Hill Cemetery
- Party: Democratic
- Education: Pennsylvania College

Samuel Feiser Glatfelter (April 7, 1858 – April 23, 1927) was a Democratic member of the U.S. House of Representatives from Pennsylvania.

== Early life ==
Samuel F. Glatfelter was born near Loganville, Pennsylvania. He attended the York County Academy and Pennsylvania College at Gettysburg, Pennsylvania. He was engaged in teaching for several years, and later became a building contractor and also interested in banking.

== Career ==
Glatfelter was elected as a Democrat to the Sixty-eighth Congress, defeating three other candidates including Republican Mahlon Haines, but was an unsuccessful candidate for reelection in 1924. He resumed his business as a building contractor.

== Died ==
Glatfelter died in York, Pennsylvania, aged 69. He was interred in Prospect Hill Cemetery. Cause of death according to the coroner's records was carcinoma of the intestines. He was survived by his wife, Ida A. Glatfelter.

Various properties and lots of land he owned at the time of his death were sold or auctioned off on September 22, 1927.

U.S. House of Representatives
Preceded by Adam M. Wyant	Member of the U.S. House of Representatives from Pennsylvania's 22nd congressional district 1923–1925	Succeeded by Franklin Menges
