= D. Emmert Brumbaugh =

American politician

David Emmert Brumbaugh
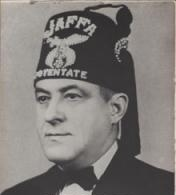
- Brumbaugh as Potentate of Altoona, Pennsylvania's Jaffa Shrine, 1952

Member of the U.S. House of Representatives from Pennsylvania
- In office November 2, 1943 – January 3, 1947
- Preceded by: James E. Van Zandt
- Succeeded by: James E. Van Zandt
- Constituency: 23rd district (1943–1945); 22nd district (1945–1947)

Member of the Pennsylvania State Senate
- In office 1963-1967

Personal details
- Born: October 8, 1894 Martinsburg, Pennsylvania, US
- Died: April 22, 1977 (aged 82) Claysburg, Pennsylvania, US
- Party: Republican

David Emmert Brumbaugh (October 8, 1894 – April 22, 1977) was an American politician. He was a Republican member of the U.S. House of Representatives from Pennsylvania.

D. Emmert Brumbaugh was born in Martinsburg, Pennsylvania. He was a student of the International Correspondence Schools of Scranton, Pennsylvania, and in 1914 he became interested in banking at Claysburg, Pennsylvania. During the First World War, he served as a private in the Thirty-third Division, Fifty-eighth Brigade Headquarters, serving overseas in 1918 and 1919, where he served with his cousin, Dr. David Brumbaugh. In 1921, he became interested in the lumber business and later established an insurance agency. He was a trustee of the Pennsylvania Industrial School in Huntingdon, Pennsylvania, from 1939 to 1943.

The Republican Party elected Brumbaugh to the Seventy-eighth Congress to fill the vacancy caused by the resignation of James E. Van Zandt. He was reelected to the Seventy-ninth Congress. He was not a candidate for renomination in 1946. He served as Secretary of Banking for the Commonwealth of Pennsylvania in Harrisburg, Pennsylvania, from 1947 to 1951. He resumed his banking interests as president of the First National Bank of Claysburg. He was a delegate to the 1956 Republican National Convention from Pennsylvania. He served in the Pennsylvania State Senate from 1963 to 1967.

U.S. House of Representatives
Preceded by James E. Van Zandt	Member of the U.S. House of Representatives from Pennsylvania's 23rd congressional district 1943–1945	Succeeded by J. Buell Snyder
Preceded by Chester H. Gross	Member of the U.S. House of Representatives from Pennsylvania's 22nd congressional district 1945–1947	Succeeded by James E. Van Zandt
