= 1962 United States Senate election in Pennsylvania =

- November 6, 1962
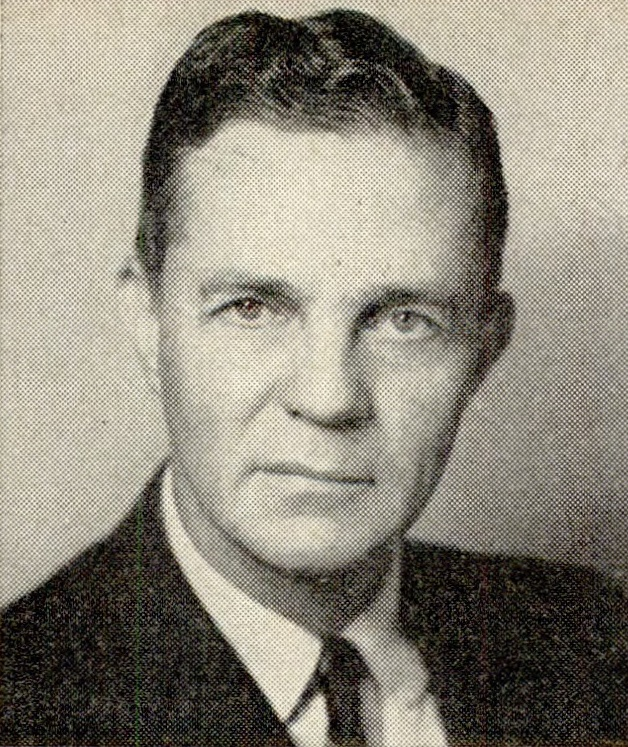

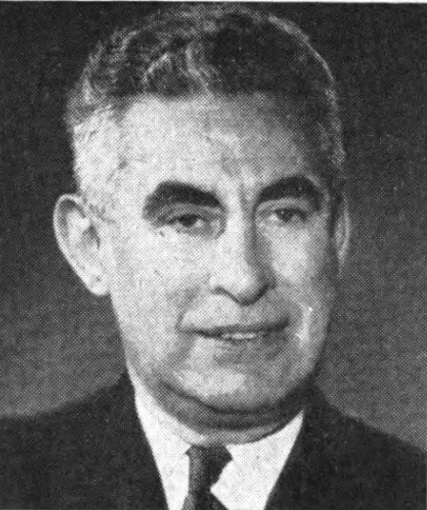
Nominee	Joseph S. Clark Jr.	James E. Van Zandt
Party	Democratic	Republican
Popular vote	2,238,383	2,134,649
Percentage	51.07%	48.70%
- County results Clark: 40–50% 50–60% 60–70% Zandt: 50–60% 60–70% 70–80%
U.S. senator before election
Joseph S. Clark, Jr.
Democratic
Elected U.S. Senator
Joseph S. Clark, Jr.
Democratic

The 1962 United States Senate election in Pennsylvania was held on November 6, 1962. Incumbent Democratic U.S. Senator Joseph S. Clark, Jr. successfully sought re-election to another term, defeating Republican nominee James E. Van Zandt.

A Democratic U.S. Senator would not be elected in Pennsylvania until 1991, and not again in a regular election until 2006. This was the last time the Democrats won the Class 3 Senate seat from Pennsylvania until John Fetterman's victory in 2022. (Note: Arlen Specter, who was elected to the seat as a Republican in 1980, switched to the Democratic Party in 2009 before being defeated for re-nomination in 2010.)

== General election ==
=== Candidates ===
- Arla A. Albaugh (Socialist Labor)
- Joseph S. Clark Jr., incumbent U.S. Senator since 1957 (Democratic)
- James E. Van Zandt, U.S. Representative from Altoona (Republican)

=== Campaign ===
The 1962 Senate race took place alongside a gubernatorial race that garnered most of the media's attention. Van Zandt criticized Clark for being an idealistic liberal and stressed an anti-communist platform. He also attacked Clark for Clark's support of the Kennedy administration's foreign policy towards both China and Cuba. In return, Clark portrayed Van Zandt as a proponent of McCarthyism who would be "trigger happy" as a Senator.

In the end, Clark was re-elected to the United States Senate, winning his second term. He beat Van Zandt in the nine-county area of Southwestern Pennsylvania surrounding Pittsburgh by nearly 200,000 votes, but lost Central Pennsylvania and the Philadelphia suburbs to Van Zandt. Clark increased his margin of victory in the Southwest from 1956, and his 108,000 vote margin in Allegheny County was an important factor in his victory.

=== Results ===
General election results
Party	Candidate	Votes	%	±%
Democratic	Joseph S. Clark, Jr. (incumbent)	2,238,383	51.07%	
Republican	James E. Van Zandt	2,134,649	48.70%	
Socialist Labor	Arla A. Albaugh	10,387	0.24%	
N/A	Other	2	0.00%	
Democratic hold				
