= Samuel Hays (Pennsylvania politician) =

American politician

Member of the U.S. House of Representatives from Pennsylvania's 22nd district
- In office March 4, 1843 – March 3, 1845
- Preceded by: William W. Irwin
- Succeeded by: William Swan Garvin

Member of the Pennsylvania Senate for the 22nd district
- In office 1839–1842

Member of the Pennsylvania House of Representatives
- In office 1813; 1816; 1823; 1825

Personal details
- Born: September 10, 1783 County Donegal, Ireland
- Died: July 1, 1868 (aged 84) Franklin, Pennsylvania, U.S.
- Party: Democratic

Samuel Hays (September 10, 1783 – July 1, 1868) was an American politician who served as a Democratic member of the U.S. House of Representatives for Pennsylvania's 22nd congressional district from 1843 to 1845.

== Biography ==
Samuel Hays was born in County Donegal, Ireland. In 1792, he emigrated to the United States with his mother, and settled in Franklin, Pennsylvania. He served as treasurer of Venango County, Pennsylvania in 1808. He was elected sheriff of Venango County in 1808, 1820, 1829, and in 1833. He was a member of the Pennsylvania House of Representatives in 1813, 1816; 1823, and 1825, and served in the Pennsylvania State Senate for the 22nd district from 1839 to 1842. He was a member of the board of trustees of Allegheny College in Meadville, Pennsylvania, from 1837 to 1861. He served as brigadier general, commanding the First Brigade, Seventeenth Division, Pennsylvania Militia, from 1841 to 1843.

Hays was elected as a Democrat to the Twenty-eighth Congress. He was not a candidate for renomination in 1844. He was engaged in iron manufactures, operating furnaces on French Creek, near Franklin. In 1847, he was appointed marshal for the western district of Pennsylvania. He served as associate judge of the district court in 1856. He died in Franklin in 1868, interment in Old Town Cemetery and reinterment in Franklin Cemetery.

Hays's son, Major General Alexander Hays, was a noteworthy Union Army officer during the US Civil War and close personal friend of Ulysses S. Grant.

== Sources ==
- United States Congress. "Samuel Hays (id: H000406)". Biographical Directory of the United States Congress.
- The Political Graveyard

Pennsylvania House of Representatives
Preceded by	Member of the Pennsylvania House of Representatives; 1813, 1816, 1823, 1825	Succeeded by
Pennsylvania State Senate
Preceded by Henry Humbert Fore	Member of the Pennsylvania Senate, 22nd district 1839-1842	Succeeded by Charles Alexander Black
U.S. House of Representatives
Preceded by William W. Irwin	Member of the U.S. House of Representatives from Pennsylvania's 22nd congressional district 1843 - 1845	Succeeded by William S. Garvin
