= Franklin Menges =

American politician

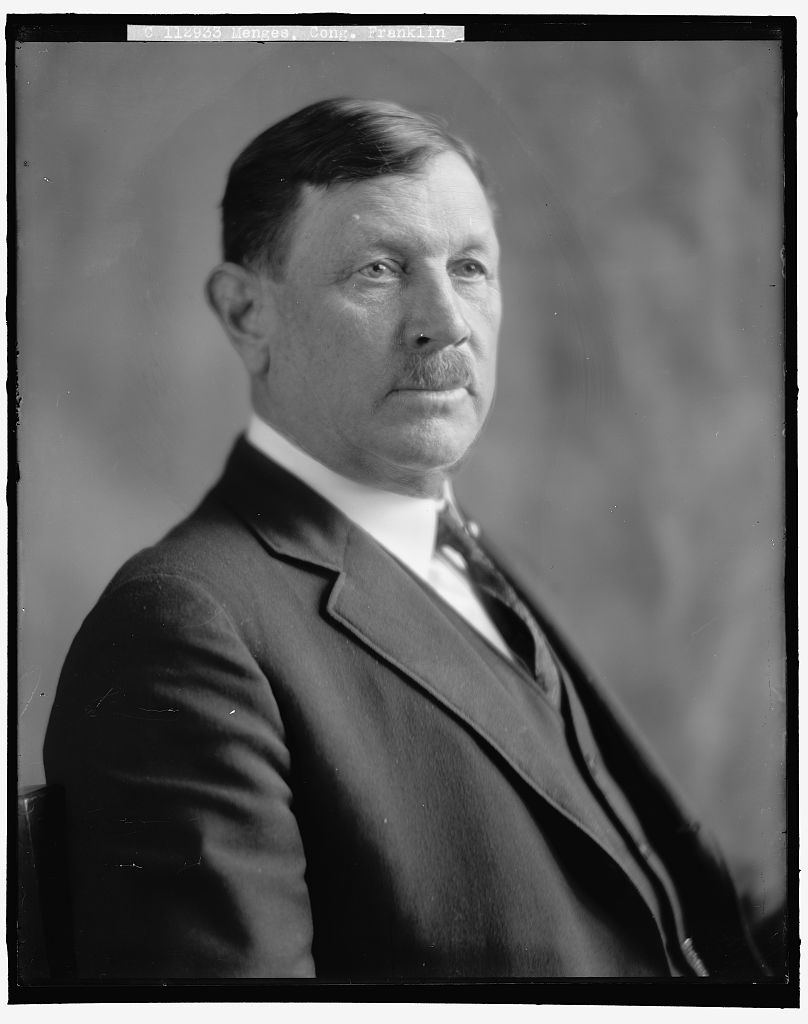

Member of the U.S. House of Representatives from Pennsylvania's 22nd district
- In office March 4, 1925 – March 3, 1931
- Preceded by: Samuel F. Glatfelter
- Succeeded by: Harry L. Haines

Personal details
- Born: October 26, 1858 Menges Mills, Pennsylvania
- Died: May 12, 1956 (aged 97) Arlington, Virginia
- Party: Republican
- Education: Gettysburg College
- Profession: educator

Franklin Menges (October 26, 1858 – May 12, 1956) was a Republican member of the U.S. House of Representatives from Pennsylvania.

== Early life and career ==
Franklin Menges was born at Menges Mills, York County, Pennsylvania. He attended Baugher Academy Preparatory School in Hanover, Pennsylvania, and graduated from Gettysburg College in 1886.

He became an instructor in chemistry and physics at Gettysburg College from 1886 to 1896, and then head of the science department of York High School from 1897 to 1903.

He was a lecturer at farmers' institutes in Pennsylvania and other states from 1898 to 1918, and represented the Pennsylvania Department of Agriculture at the Louisiana Purchase Exposition at the World's Fair in 1904.

He made a soil survey of the State of Pennsylvania, and was the author of numerous articles on scientific agriculture. In 1914, his book, Soils of Pennsylvania was published.

Menges was elected as a Republican to the Sixty-ninth, Seventieth, and Seventy-first Congresses. He was an unsuccessful candidate for reelection in 1930.

He was engaged in agricultural pursuits on his farm near York, Pennsylvania, until his retirement in 1947. He moved to Arlington, Virginia, where he died; interred at Evergreen Cemetery, Gettysburg, Pennsylvania.

U.S. House of Representatives
Preceded by Samuel F. Glatfelter	Member of the U.S. House of Representatives from Pennsylvania's 22nd congressional district 1925–1931	Succeeded by Harry L. Haines
