= James F. Lind =

American politician

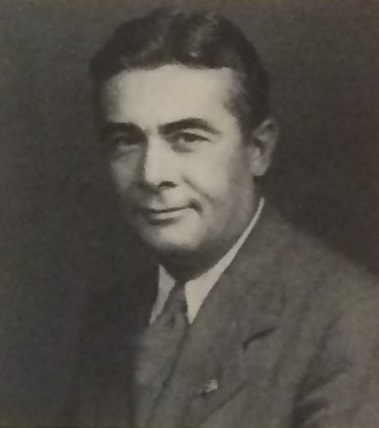
- Lind, c. 1949

Member of the U.S. House of Representatives from Pennsylvania's 21st district
- In office January 3, 1949 – January 3, 1953
- Preceded by: Chester H. Gross
- Succeeded by: Augustine B. Kelley

Personal details
- Born: October 17, 1900 York, Pennsylvania, U.S.
- Died: April 11, 1975 (aged 74) York, Pennsylvania, U.S.
- Party: Democratic
- Spouse: Grace Elizabeth Stahl (m. 1922)
- Children: 1
- Parents: William E. Lind (father); Alice E. Shanabrough (mother)
- Education: Pennsylvania State University
- Occupation: Accountant; politician

Military service
- Allegiance: United States
- Branch: United States Army (1917–1920, 1941–1946, 1953); United States Army Reserve (1934–1941); Pennsylvania National Guard (1934–1941)
- Years of service: 1917–1920; 1934–1946; 1953
- Rank: colonel
- Conflicts: World War I World War II; Korean War

James Francis Lind (October 17, 1900 – April 11, 1975) was a Democratic member of the U.S. House of Representatives from Pennsylvania.

== Early life and career ==
James F. Lind was born in York, Pennsylvania, the son of William E. and Alice E. (née Shanabrough) Lind. He graduated from a Penn State branch campus as an accountant. He served in the United States Army from 1917 to 1920, 1941 to 1946, and in 1953. He also served in the United States Army Reserve from 1934 to 1941, and the Pennsylvania National Guard from 1934 to 1941. He served on the Veterans’ Administration of York County, Pennsylvania, from 1946 to 1947, and as chief clerk to the York County Board of Commissioners in 1948.

He married Grace Elizabeth Stahl in 1922, and they had one son, R. James Lind.

== Tenure ==
Lind was elected as a Democrat to the 81st Congress in 1948, defeating incumbent Republican Congressman Chester H. Gross, and was re-elected to the 82nd Congress in 1950. He was an unsuccessful candidate for reelection in 1952, defeated by Republican S. Walter Stauffer.

== Retirement and death ==
After his time in Congress, he served as controller of York County. He died on April 11, 1975, in York and is interred in Arlington National Cemetery.

U.S. House of Representatives
Preceded by Chester H. Gross	Member of the U.S. House of Representatives from Pennsylvania's 21st congressional district 1949–1953	Succeeded by Augustine B. Kelley
