= James E. Van Zandt =

American politician

James Van Zandt
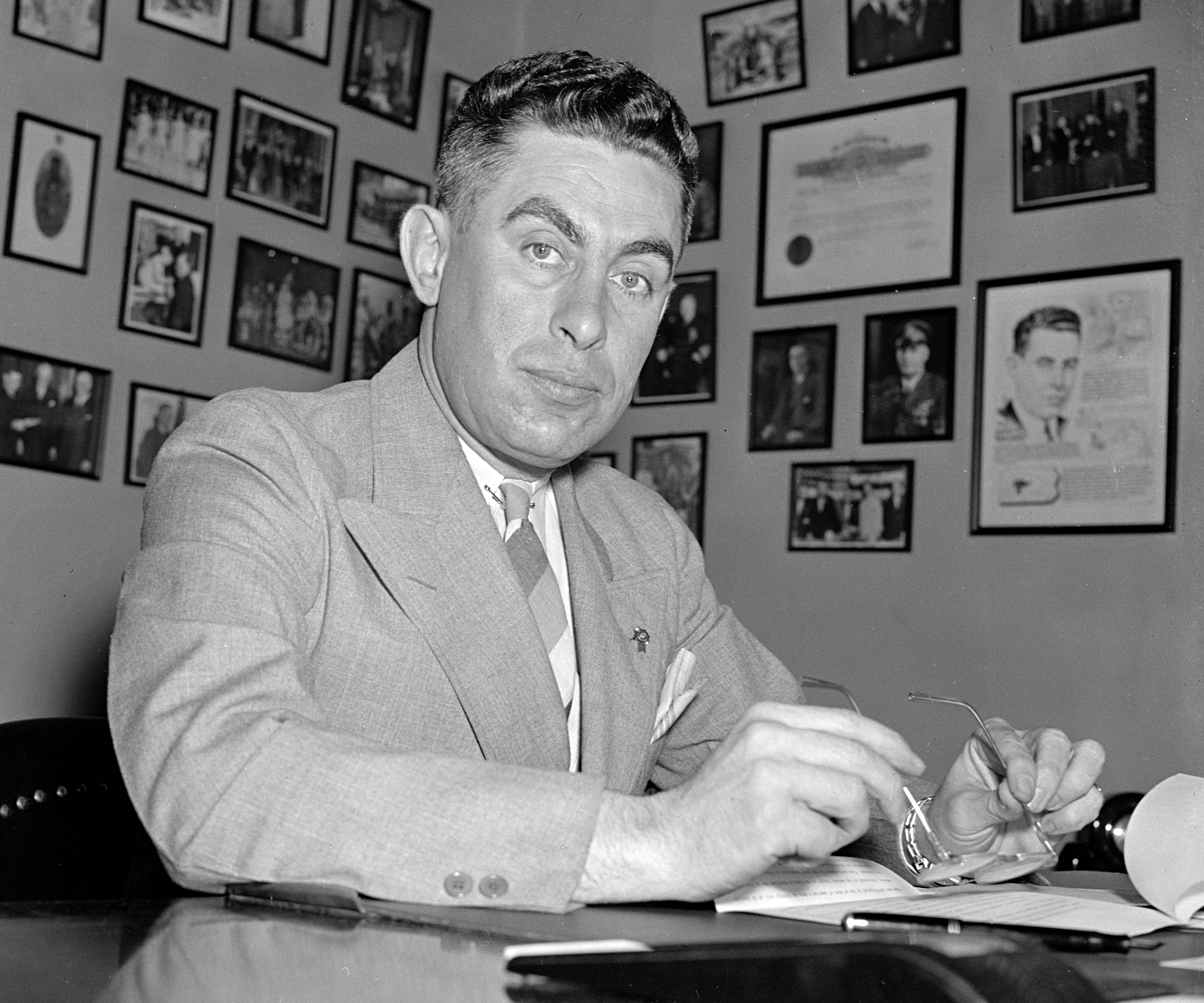

Member of the U.S. House of Representatives from Pennsylvania
- In office January 3, 1947 – January 3, 1963
- Preceded by: D. Emmert Brumbaugh
- Succeeded by: J. Irving Whalley (redistricted)
- Constituency: 22nd district (1947–1953); 20th district (1953–1963)
- In office January 3, 1939 – September 24, 1943
- Preceded by: Don Gingery
- Succeeded by: D. Emmert Brumbaugh
- Constituency: 23rd district

Personal details
- Born: James Edward Van Zandt; December 18, 1898 Altoona, Pennsylvania, U.S.
- Died: January 6, 1986 (aged 87) Arlington, Virginia, U.S.
- Party: Republican

Military service
- Branch/service: United States Navy
- Years of service: 1917–1959
- Rank: Rear Admiral

James Edward Van Zandt (December 18, 1898 – January 6, 1986) was an American Republican Party politician who represented Altoona, Pennsylvania in the U.S. House of Representatives for eleven terms from 1939 to 1963.

== Biography ==
James Van Zandt was born in Altoona, Pennsylvania; his maternal grandparents were Irish immigrants. In 1917 he enlisted as an apprentice seaman in the United States Navy and served two years. He was a member of the United States Naval Reserve from 1919 to 1943, rising to the rank of lieutenant. In December 1933 he toured the country with Smedley Butler to recruit members for the Veterans of Foreign Wars (VFW). He was the national commander of the Veterans of Foreign Wars from 1934 to 1936. He later corroborated Butler's testimony regarding the Business Plot, stating that 'agents of Wall Street' had also attempted to recruit him for a planned coup to overthrow Franklin Delano Roosevelt, shortly after Butler warned him against them.

He was elected in 1938 as a Republican to the 76th, 77th, and 78th United States Congresses, and served from January 3, 1939, until his resignation September 24, 1943, when he re-entered the service. While a Member of Congress he was called to active duty in September 1941 and served until January 1942 with the Pacific Fleet and in escort convoy duty in the North Atlantic. He reentered the service in September 1943 as a lieutenant commander and was assigned to the Pacific area until discharged as a captain in 1946, and retired as rear admiral in United States Naval Reserve in 1959.

He was elected to the 80th and to the seven succeeding Congresses. Van Zandt, while a member of the House Armed Services Committee, made an impassioned speech on the House floor leveling charges against Secretary of Defense Louis A. Johnson and Air Force Secretary Stuart Symington in regard to the procurement of the B-36 bomber. This speech brought into public view the "Revolt of the Admirals". The basis of these charges was a bogus document from Cedric Worth who was the special assistant to the Under Secretary of the Navy Dan Kimball. On June 9, 1948, the HASC voted to investigate the charges.

In the 1954 attack on the House of Representatives by Puerto Rican nationalists, he tackled and disarmed one of the shooters. Van Zandt voted in favor of the Civil Rights Acts of 1957 and 1960, as well as the 24th Amendment to the U.S. Constitution. In 1962, he unsuccessfully challenged United States Senator Joe Clark, who won re-election to a second term by a 51 to 49 percent margin. He was a Special Representative of the Governor of Pennsylvania until 1971. He is buried at Arlington National Cemetery.

== See also ==
- Business Plot

== Sources ==
- United States Congress. "James E. Van Zandt (id: V000069)". Biographical Directory of the United States Congress. Retrieved on 2008-02-07
- The Political Graveyard

U.S. House of Representatives
Preceded by Don Gingery	Member of the U.S. House of Representatives from Pennsylvania's 23rd congressional district 1939–1943	Succeeded by J. Buell Snyder
Preceded by D. Emmert Brumbaugh	Member of the U.S. House of Representatives from Pennsylvania's 22nd congressional district 1947–1953	Succeeded by John Saylor
Preceded by Francis Walter	Member of the U.S. House of Representatives from Pennsylvania's 20th congressional district 1953–1963	Succeeded by Elmer Holland
Party political offices
Preceded by James Duff	Republican nominee for U.S. Senator from Pennsylvania (Class 3); 1962	Succeeded by Richard Schweiker
