= Charles H. Rowland =

American politician

Charles Hedding Rowland
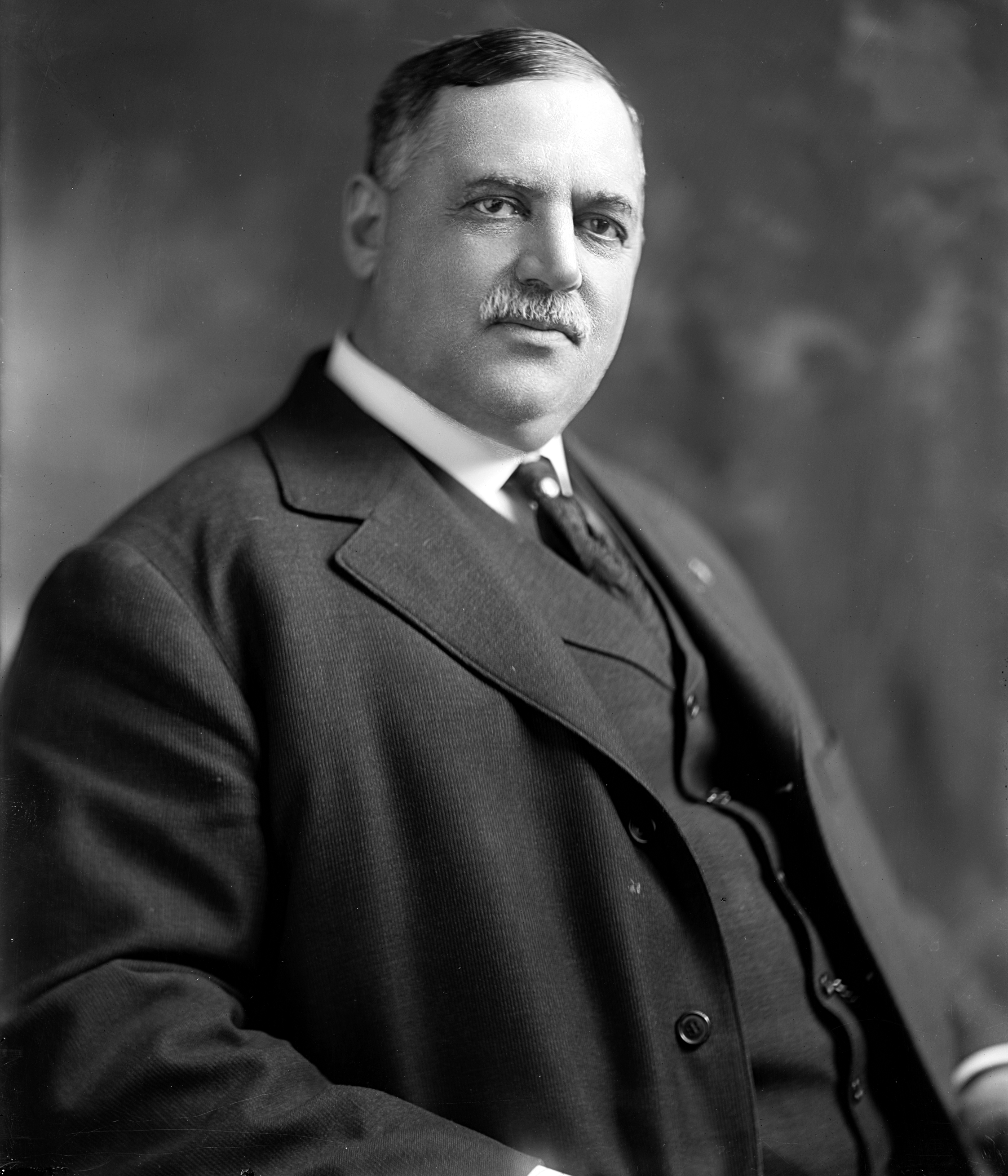

Member of the U.S. House of Representatives from Pennsylvania's 21st district
- In office March 4, 1915 – March 3, 1919
- Preceded by: Charles E. Patton
- Succeeded by: Evan J. Jones

Personal details
- Born: December 20, 1860 Hancock, Maryland
- Died: November 24, 1921 (aged 60) Philipsburg, Centre County, Pennsylvania
- Resting place: 40.8864°N 78.2114°W
- Party: Republican

Charles Hedding Rowland (December 20, 1860 – November 24, 1921) was a Republican member of the U.S. House of Representatives from Pennsylvania.

== Biography ==
Rowland was born in Hancock, Maryland. He moved to Huntingdon County, Pennsylvania, in 1866 and to Houtzdale, Pennsylvania, in 1874. He was president of the Moshannon Coal Mining Company and of the Pittsburgh & Susquehanna Railroad Company.

He was elected as a Republican to the Sixty-fourth and Sixty-fifth Congresses from Pennsylvania's twenty-first district. He declined to be a candidate for renomination in 1918.

Rowland died in Philipsburg, Pennsylvania, aged 60, and was interred in the Philipsburg Cemetery.

== The Rowland Theater ==
In 1910, fire destroyed the Pierce Opera House, as well as a number of other Front Street buildings, in Philipsburg. Five years later, on December 31, 1915, Rowland's family purchased the site and began plans to construct a new building suitable to the needs of the local community.

Upon its completion in June 1917, Rowland released the following statement, printed on the brochure distributed to the public on opening night:

The people of Philipsburg have long indulged the hope of a comfortable and commodious place of amusement and entertainment. For years we have had no suitable place for public meetings, entertaining conventions, or any auditorium large enough for the varied necessities of a community as large as ours. Such a building is a public necessity. The town needs it in order to keep pace with out [sic?] sister communities. Community growth would be retarded without such a public convenience.

I have felt that we should have a theatre building in Philipsburg of size, safety and perfection of appointment that would anticipate the future, maintain our best past traditions, reflect a progressive spirit, while affording us a place to spend a delightful evening at home. It is proposed to stage only plays and moving pictures of class and quality. I trust the people of Philipsburg, together with those who come from surrounding towns, may enjoy the playhouse now dedicated to their use and pleasure. I wish to take this occasion to say to the theatre going public that it has been a source of some gratification to have been the one permitted to open to the general public a place for its comfort and entertainment.

Today, the Rowland Theater remains open to the public for motion pictures, stage plays, orchestras, and more. It is listed on the National Register of Historic Places.

U.S. House of Representatives
| Preceded by Charles E. Patton | Member of the U.S. House of Representatives from Pennsylvania's 21st congressional district 1915–1919 | Succeeded by Evan J. Jones |
