= Chester H. Gross =

American politician

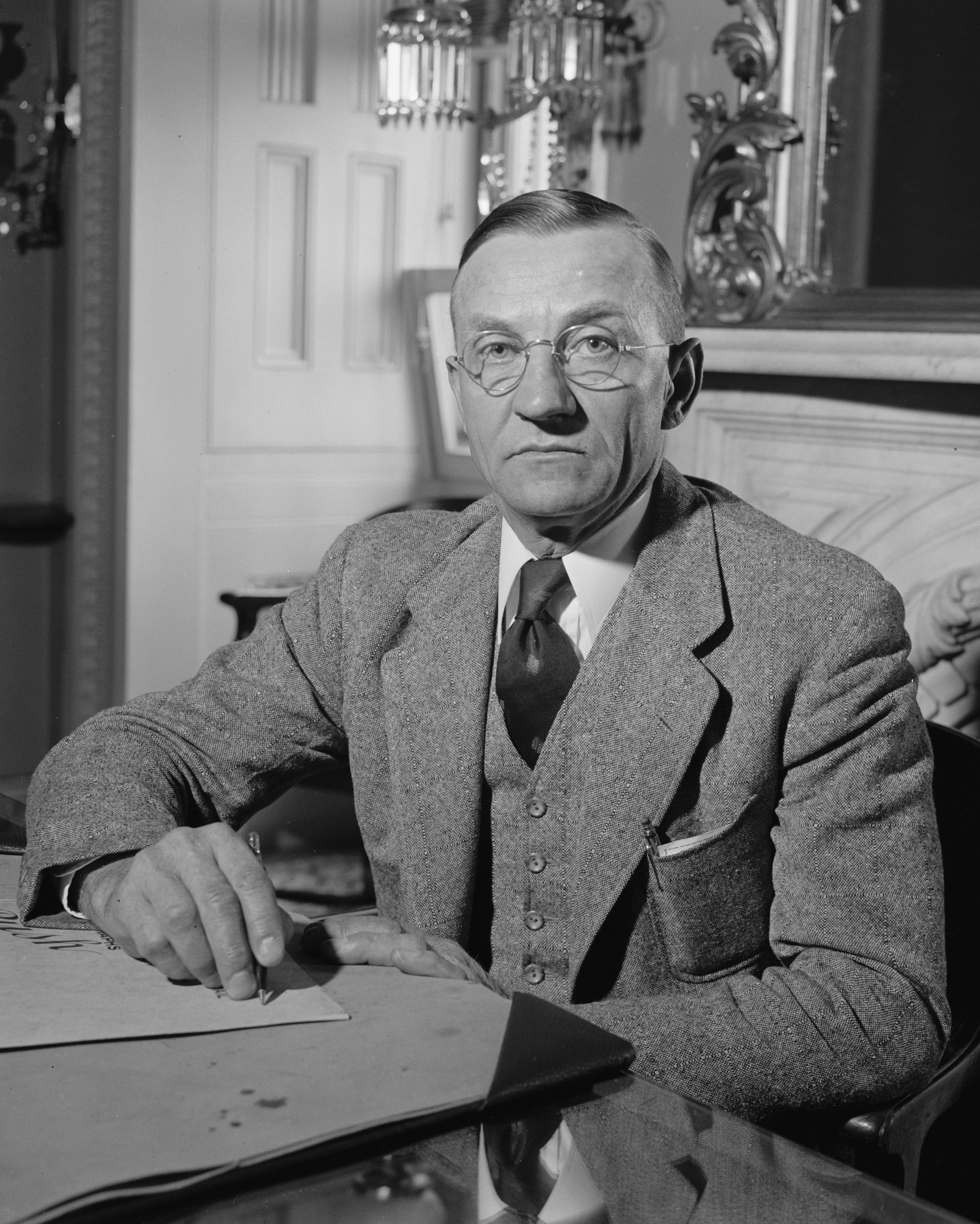
- Harris & Ewing photo, 1939

Member of the U.S. House of Representatives from Pennsylvania
- In office January 3, 1943 – January 3, 1949
- Preceded by: Harry L. Haines
- Succeeded by: James F. Lind
- Constituency: 22nd district (1943–1945); 21st district (1945–1949)
- In office January 3, 1939 – January 3, 1941
- Preceded by: Harry L. Haines
- Succeeded by: Harry L. Haines
- Constituency: 22nd district

Member of the Pennsylvania House of Representatives
- In office 1929–1930

Personal details
- Born: October 13, 1888 East Manchester Township, Pennsylvania
- Died: January 9, 1973 (aged 84) York County, Pennsylvania
- Party: Republican
- Education: Pennsylvania State College

Chester Heilman Gross (October 13, 1888 – January 9, 1973) was an American politician. He was a Republican member of the United States House of Representatives from Pennsylvania.

== Biography ==
Chester H. Gross was born on a farm in East Manchester Township, York County, Pennsylvania on October 13, 1888. He attended Pennsylvania State College at State College, Pennsylvania.

He served as township supervisor from 1918 to 1922, as a member of the Pennsylvania State House of Representatives in 1929 and 1930, as school board director from 1931 to 1940, and as president of the State School Directors Association in 1939 and 1940.

Gross was elected as a Republican to the Seventy-sixth Congress, but was an unsuccessful candidate for reelection in 1940.

He returned to farming until he was elected to the Seventy-eighth and to the two succeeding Congresses, but was an unsuccessful candidate for reelection in 1948, defeated by Democrat James F. Lind.

He was then an unsuccessful candidate for the Republican nomination in 1954 and 1956.

After his time in Congress he worked as a real estate salesman until his retirement.

== Death and interment ==
He died in York, Pennsylvania on January 9, 1973, and was interred in the Manchester Lutheran Cemetery in Manchester, Pennsylvania.

U.S. House of Representatives
Preceded by Harry L. Haines	Member of the U.S. House of Representatives from Pennsylvania's 22nd congressional district 1939–1941	Succeeded by Harry L. Haines
Preceded by Harry L. Haines	Member of the U.S. House of Representatives from Pennsylvania's 22nd congressional district 1943–1945	Succeeded by D. Emmert Brumbaugh
Preceded by Francis E. Walter	Member of the U.S. House of Representatives from Pennsylvania's 21st congressional district 1945–1949	Succeeded by James F. Lind
