= John W. Howe (politician) =

American politician

Member of the U.S. House of Representatives from Pennsylvania's 22nd district
- In office March 4, 1849 – March 3, 1853
- Preceded by: John Wilson Farrelly
- Succeeded by: Thomas Marshall Howe

Personal details
- Born: March 11, 1801 District of Maine, Massachusetts
- Died: November 30, 1873 (aged 72) Rochester, New York
- Party: Free Soil; Whig

John W. Howe (March 11, 1801 – November 30, 1873) was a Free Soil and Whig member of the U.S. House of Representatives from Pennsylvania.

== Biography ==
Howe was born in Massachusetts' District of Maine in 1801. He studied law and was admitted to the bar. He moved to Smethport, Pennsylvania, and then to Franklin, Pennsylvania, in 1829 and commenced the practice of law. He also served as justice of the peace.

Howe was elected as a Free Soil candidate to the Thirty-first Congress and reelected as a Whig to the Thirty-second Congress. He moved to Meadville, Pennsylvania, and later to Rochester, New York, where he died in 1873. Interment in Greendale Cemetery in Meadville, Pennsylvania.

== Sources ==
- United States Congress. "John W. Howe (id: H000853)". Biographical Directory of the United States Congress.
- The Political Graveyard

U.S. House of Representatives
Preceded by John W. Farrelly	Member of the U.S. House of Representatives from Pennsylvania's 22nd congressional district 1849 - 1853	Succeeded by Thomas M. Howe
