= Illinois's congressional delegations =

Since Illinois became a U.S. state in 1818, it has sent congressional delegations to the United States Senate and United States House of Representatives. Each state elects two senators to serve for six years, and members of the House to two-year terms. Before becoming a state, the Illinois Territory elected a non-voting delegate at-large to Congress from 1812 to 1818.

These are tables of congressional delegations from Illinois to the United States Senate and the United States House of Representatives.

== Current delegation ==
Current U.S. senators from Illinois
Illinois CPVI (2025): D+6	Class II senator	Class III senator
Illinois CPVI (2025): D+6	Dick Durbin (Senior senator) (Springfield)	Tammy Duckworth (Junior senator) (Hoffman Estates)
Party	Democratic	Democratic
Incumbent since	January 3, 1997	January 3, 2017

Illinois's current congressional delegation in the 119th Congress consists of its two senators, both of whom are Democrats, and its 17 representatives: 14 Democrats and 3 Republicans.

The current dean of the Illinois delegation is Senator Dick Durbin, having served in the Senate since 1997 and in Congress since 1983.

Current U.S. representatives from Illinois
District	Member (Residence)	Party	Incumbent since	CPVI (2025)	District map
1st	Jonathan Jackson (Chicago)	Democratic	January 3, 2023	D+18	
2nd	Robin Kelly (Matteson)	Democratic	April 11, 2013	D+18	
3rd	Delia Ramirez (Chicago)	Democratic	January 3, 2023	D+17	
4th	Chuy García (Chicago)	Democratic	January 3, 2019	D+17	
5th	Mike Quigley (Chicago)	Democratic	April 7, 2009	D+19	
6th	Sean Casten (Downers Grove)	Democratic	January 3, 2019	D+3	
7th	Danny Davis (Chicago)	Democratic	January 3, 1997	D+34	
8th	Raja Krishnamoorthi (Schaumburg)	Democratic	January 3, 2017	D+5	
9th	Jan Schakowsky (Evanston)	Democratic	January 3, 1999	D+19	
10th	Brad Schneider (Highland Park)	Democratic	January 3, 2017	D+12	
11th	Bill Foster (Naperville)	Democratic	January 3, 2013	D+6	
12th	Mike Bost (Murphysboro)	Republican	January 3, 2015	R+22	
13th	Nikki Budzinski (Springfield)	Democratic	January 3, 2023	D+5	
14th	Lauren Underwood (Naperville)	Democratic	January 3, 2019	D+3	
15th	Mary Miller (Oakland)	Republican	January 3, 2021	R+20	
16th	Darin LaHood (Peoria)	Republican	September 10, 2015	R+11	
17th	Eric Sorensen (Moline)	Democratic	January 3, 2023	D+3	

== United States Senate ==
Class II senator	Congress	Class III senator
Jesse B. Thomas (DR)	15th (1817–1819)	Ninian Edwards (DR)
Jesse B. Thomas (DR)	16th (1819–1821)	Ninian Edwards (DR)
Jesse B. Thomas (DR)	17th (1821–1823)	Ninian Edwards (DR)
Jesse B. Thomas (DR)	18th (1823–1825)	Ninian Edwards (DR)
Jesse B. Thomas (DR)	18th (1823–1825)	John McLean (DR)
Jesse B. Thomas (NR)	19th (1825–1827)	Elias Kane (J)
Jesse B. Thomas (NR)	20th (1827–1829)	Elias Kane (J)
John McLean (J)	21st (1829–1831)	Elias Kane (J)
David J. Baker (J)	21st (1829–1831)	Elias Kane (J)
John M. Robinson (J)	21st (1829–1831)	Elias Kane (J)
John M. Robinson (J)	22nd (1831–1833)	Elias Kane (J)
John M. Robinson (J)	23rd (1833–1835)	Elias Kane (J)
John M. Robinson (J)	24th (1835–1837)	Elias Kane (J)
John M. Robinson (J)	24th (1835–1837)	William Lee D. Ewing (J)
John M. Robinson (D)	25th (1837–1839)	Richard M. Young (D)
John M. Robinson (D)	26th (1839–1841)	Richard M. Young (D)
Samuel McRoberts (D)	27th (1841–1843)	Richard M. Young (D)
Samuel McRoberts (D)	28th (1843–1845)	Sidney Breese (D)
James Semple (D)	28th (1843–1845)	Sidney Breese (D)
James Semple (D)	29th (1845–1847)	Sidney Breese (D)
Stephen A. Douglas (D)	30th (1847–1849)	Sidney Breese (D)
Stephen A. Douglas (D)	31st (1849–1851)	James Shields (D)
Stephen A. Douglas (D)	32nd (1851–1853)	James Shields (D)
Stephen A. Douglas (D)	33rd (1853–1855)	James Shields (D)
Stephen A. Douglas (D)	34th (1855–1857)	Lyman Trumbull (D)
Stephen A. Douglas (D)	35th (1857–1859)	Lyman Trumbull (R)
Stephen A. Douglas (D)	36th (1859–1861)	Lyman Trumbull (R)
Stephen A. Douglas (D)	37th (1861–1863)	Lyman Trumbull (R)
Orville Browning (R)	37th (1861–1863)	Lyman Trumbull (R)
William A. Richardson (D)	37th (1861–1863)	Lyman Trumbull (R)
William A. Richardson (D)	38th (1863–1865)	Lyman Trumbull (R)
Richard Yates (R)	39th (1865–1867)	Lyman Trumbull (R)
Richard Yates (R)	40th (1867–1869)	Lyman Trumbull (R)
Richard Yates (R)	41st (1869–1871)	Lyman Trumbull (R)
John A. Logan (R)	42nd (1871–1873)	Lyman Trumbull (LR)
John A. Logan (R)	43rd (1873–1875)	Richard J. Oglesby (R)
John A. Logan (R)	44th (1875–1877)	Richard J. Oglesby (R)
David Davis (I)	45th (1877–1879)	Richard J. Oglesby (R)
David Davis (I)	46th (1879–1881)	John A. Logan (R)
David Davis (I)	47th (1881–1883)	John A. Logan (R)
Shelby M. Cullom (R)	48th (1883–1885)	John A. Logan (R)
Shelby M. Cullom (R)	49th (1885–1887)	John A. Logan (R)
Shelby M. Cullom (R)	49th (1885–1887)	Charles B. Farwell (R)
Shelby M. Cullom (R)	50th (1887–1889)	Charles B. Farwell (R)
Shelby M. Cullom (R)	51st (1889–1891)	Charles B. Farwell (R)
Shelby M. Cullom (R)	52nd (1891–1893)	John M. Palmer (D)
Shelby M. Cullom (R)	53rd (1893–1895)	John M. Palmer (D)
Shelby M. Cullom (R)	54th (1895–1897)	John M. Palmer (D)
Shelby M. Cullom (R)	55th (1897–1899)	William E. Mason (R)
Shelby M. Cullom (R)	56th (1899–1901)	William E. Mason (R)
Shelby M. Cullom (R)	57th (1901–1903)	William E. Mason (R)
Shelby M. Cullom (R)	58th (1903–1905)	Albert J. Hopkins (R)
Shelby M. Cullom (R)	59th (1905–1907)	Albert J. Hopkins (R)
Shelby M. Cullom (R)	60th (1907–1909)	Albert J. Hopkins (R)
Shelby M. Cullom (R)	61st (1909–1911)	William Lorimer (R)
Shelby M. Cullom (R)	62nd (1911–1913)	William Lorimer (R)
J. Hamilton Lewis (D)	63rd (1913–1915)	Lawrence Y. Sherman (R)
J. Hamilton Lewis (D)	64th (1915–1917)	Lawrence Y. Sherman (R)
J. Hamilton Lewis (D)	65th (1917–1919)	Lawrence Y. Sherman (R)
Medill McCormick (R)	66th (1919–1921)	Lawrence Y. Sherman (R)
Medill McCormick (R)	67th (1921–1923)	William B. McKinley (R)
Medill McCormick (R)	68th (1923–1925)	William B. McKinley (R)
Charles S. Deneen (R)	68th (1923–1925)	William B. McKinley (R)
Charles S. Deneen (R)	69th (1925–1927)	William B. McKinley (R)
Charles S. Deneen (R)	69th (1925–1927)	Frank L. Smith (R)
Charles S. Deneen (R)	70th (1927–1929)	Frank L. Smith (R)
Charles S. Deneen (R)	70th (1927–1929)	Otis F. Glenn (R)
Charles S. Deneen (R)	71st (1929–1931)	Otis F. Glenn (R)
J. Hamilton Lewis (D)	72nd (1931–1933)	Otis F. Glenn (R)
J. Hamilton Lewis (D)	73rd (1933–1935)	William H. Dieterich (D)
J. Hamilton Lewis (D)	74th (1935–1937)	William H. Dieterich (D)
J. Hamilton Lewis (D)	75th (1937–1939)	William H. Dieterich (D)
J. Hamilton Lewis (D)	76th (1939–1941)	Scott W. Lucas (D)
James M. Slattery (D)	76th (1939–1941)	Scott W. Lucas (D)
C. Wayland Brooks (R)	76th (1939–1941)	Scott W. Lucas (D)
C. Wayland Brooks (R)	77th (1941–1943)	Scott W. Lucas (D)
C. Wayland Brooks (R)	78th (1943–1945)	Scott W. Lucas (D)
C. Wayland Brooks (R)	79th (1945–1947)	Scott W. Lucas (D)
C. Wayland Brooks (R)	80th (1947–1949)	Scott W. Lucas (D)
Paul Douglas (D)	81st (1949–1951)	Scott W. Lucas (D)
Paul Douglas (D)	82nd (1951–1953)	Everett Dirksen (R)
Paul Douglas (D)	83rd (1953–1955)	Everett Dirksen (R)
Paul Douglas (D)	84th (1955–1957)	Everett Dirksen (R)
Paul Douglas (D)	85th (1957–1959)	Everett Dirksen (R)
Paul Douglas (D)	86th (1959–1961)	Everett Dirksen (R)
Paul Douglas (D)	87th (1961–1963)	Everett Dirksen (R)
Paul Douglas (D)	88th (1963–1965)	Everett Dirksen (R)
Paul Douglas (D)	89th (1965–1967)	Everett Dirksen (R)
Charles H. Percy (R)	90th (1967–1969)	Everett Dirksen (R)
Charles H. Percy (R)	91st (1969–1971)	Everett Dirksen (R)
Charles H. Percy (R)	91st (1969–1971)	Ralph Tyler Smith (R)
Charles H. Percy (R)	91st (1969–1971)	Adlai Stevenson III (D)
Charles H. Percy (R)	92nd (1971–1973)	Adlai Stevenson III (D)
Charles H. Percy (R)	93rd (1973–1975)	Adlai Stevenson III (D)
Charles H. Percy (R)	94th (1975–1977)	Adlai Stevenson III (D)
Charles H. Percy (R)	95th (1977–1979)	Adlai Stevenson III (D)
Charles H. Percy (R)	96th (1979–1981)	Adlai Stevenson III (D)
Charles H. Percy (R)	97th (1981–1983)	Alan J. Dixon (D)
Charles H. Percy (R)	98th (1983–1985)	Alan J. Dixon (D)
Paul Simon (D)	99th (1985–1987)	Alan J. Dixon (D)
Paul Simon (D)	100th (1987–1989)	Alan J. Dixon (D)
Paul Simon (D)	101st (1989–1991)	Alan J. Dixon (D)
Paul Simon (D)	102nd (1991–1993)	Alan J. Dixon (D)
Paul Simon (D)	103rd (1993–1995)	Carol Moseley Braun (D)
Paul Simon (D)	104th (1995–1997)	Carol Moseley Braun (D)
Dick Durbin (D)	105th (1997–1999)	Carol Moseley Braun (D)
Dick Durbin (D)	106th (1999–2001)	Peter Fitzgerald (R)
Dick Durbin (D)	107th (2001–2003)	Peter Fitzgerald (R)
Dick Durbin (D)	108th (2003–2005)	Peter Fitzgerald (R)
Dick Durbin (D)	109th (2005–2007)	Barack Obama (D)
Dick Durbin (D)	110th (2007–2009)	Barack Obama (D)
Dick Durbin (D)	111th (2009–2011)	Roland Burris (D)
Dick Durbin (D)	111th (2009–2011)	Mark Kirk (R)
Dick Durbin (D)	112th (2011–2013)	Mark Kirk (R)
Dick Durbin (D)	113th (2013–2015)	Mark Kirk (R)
Dick Durbin (D)	114th (2015–2017)	Mark Kirk (R)
Dick Durbin (D)	115th (2017–2019)	Tammy Duckworth (D)
Dick Durbin (D)	116th (2019–2021)	Tammy Duckworth (D)
Dick Durbin (D)	117th (2021–2023)	Tammy Duckworth (D)
Dick Durbin (D)	118th (2023–2025)	Tammy Duckworth (D)
Dick Durbin (D)	119th (2025–2027)	Tammy Duckworth (D)
Juliana Stratton (D)	120th (2027–2029)	Tammy Duckworth (D)

== United States House of Representatives ==
=== 1812–1818: 1 non-voting delegate ===
Starting on December 3, 1812, Illinois Territory sent a non-voting delegate to the House.

Years	Delegate from Territory's at-large district
December 3, 1812 – August 2, 1813	Shadrach Bond (DR)
November 14, 1814 – March 3, 1817	Benjamin Stephenson (DR)
March 4, 1817 – November 30, 1818	Nathaniel Pope (DR)

Part of the area of Illinois Territory became the State of Illinois on December 3, 1818.

=== 1818–1833: 1 seat ===
Following statehood on December 3, 1818, Illinois had one seat in the House.

Congress	At-large district
15th (1818–1819)	John McLean (DR)
16th (1819–1821)	Daniel Pope Cook (DR) (Note: Supported the Adams-Clay faction in the 1824 United States presidential election.)
17th (1821–1823)	Daniel Pope Cook (DR)
18th (1823–1825)	Daniel Pope Cook (DR)
19th (1825–1827)	Daniel Pope Cook (NR)
20th (1827–1829)	Joseph Duncan (J)
21st (1829–1831)	Joseph Duncan (J)
22nd (1831–1833)	Joseph Duncan (J)

=== 1833–1843: 3 seats ===
Following the 1830 census, Illinois was apportioned three seats, all elected via single-member districts.

Congress	1st district	2nd district	3rd district
23rd (1833–1835)	Charles Slade (J)	Zadok Casey (J)	Joseph Duncan (J)
23rd (1833–1835)	John Reynolds (J)	Zadok Casey (J)	William L. May (J)
24th (1835–1837)	John Reynolds (J)	Zadok Casey (J)	William L. May (J)
25th (1837–1839)	Adam W. Snyder (D)	Zadok Casey (D)	William L. May (D)
26th (1839–1841)	John Reynolds (D)	Zadok Casey (D)	John T. Stuart (W)
27th (1841–1843)	John Reynolds (D)	Zadok Casey (ID)	John T. Stuart (W)

=== 1843–1853: 7 seats ===
Following the 1840 census, Illinois was apportioned seven seats.

Congress	1st district	2nd district	3rd district	4th district	5th district	6th district	7th district
28th (1843–1845)	Robert Smith (D)	John A. McClernand (D)	Orlando B. Ficklin (D)	John Wentworth (D)	Stephen A. Douglas (D)	Joseph P. Hoge (D)	John J. Hardin (W)
29th (1845–1847)	Robert Smith (D)	John A. McClernand (D)	Orlando B. Ficklin (D)	John Wentworth (D)	Stephen A. Douglas (D)	Joseph P. Hoge (D)	Edward D. Baker (W)
29th (1845–1847)	Robert Smith (D)	John A. McClernand (D)	Orlando B. Ficklin (D)	John Wentworth (D)	Stephen A. Douglas (D)	Joseph P. Hoge (D)	John Henry (W)
30th (1847–1849)	Robert Smith (ID)	John A. McClernand (D)	Orlando B. Ficklin (D)	John Wentworth (D)	William Alexander; Richardson (D)	Thomas J. Turner (D)	Abraham Lincoln (W)
31st (1849–1851)	William Henry; Bissell (D)	John A. McClernand (D)	Timothy R. Young (D)	John Wentworth (D)	William Alexander; Richardson (D)	Edward D. Baker (W)	Thomas L. Harris (D)
32nd (1851–1853)	William Henry; Bissell (D)	Willis Allen (D)	Orlando B. Ficklin (D)	Richard S. Molony (D)	William Alexander; Richardson (D)	Thompson Campbell (D)	Richard Yates (W)

=== 1853–1863: 9 seats ===
Following the 1850 census, Illinois was apportioned nine seats.

Congress	District								
Congress	1st	2nd	3rd	4th	5th	6th	7th	8th	9th
33rd (1853–1855)	Elihu Washburne (W)	John Wentworth (D)	Jesse O. Norton (W)	James Knox (W)	William Alexander; Richardson (D)	Richard Yates (W)	James C. Allen (D)	William H. Bissell (ID)	Willis Allen (D)
34th (1855–1857)	Elihu Washburne (R)	James H. Woodworth (R)	Jesse O. Norton (O)	James Knox (O)	William Alexander; Richardson (D)	Thomas L. Harris (D)	James C. Allen (D)	James L. D. Morrison (D)	Samuel S. Marshall (D)
34th (1855–1857)	Elihu Washburne (R)	James H. Woodworth (R)	Jesse O. Norton (O)	James Knox (O)	Jacob C. Davis (D)	Thomas L. Harris (D)	James C. Allen (D)	James L. D. Morrison (D)	Samuel S. Marshall (D)
35th (1857–1859)	Elihu Washburne (R)	John F. Farnsworth (R)	Owen Lovejoy (R)	William; Kellogg (R)	Isaac N. Morris (D)	Thomas L. Harris (D)	Aaron Shaw (D)	Robert Smith (D)	Samuel S. Marshall (D)
35th (1857–1859)	Elihu Washburne (R)	John F. Farnsworth (R)	Owen Lovejoy (R)	William; Kellogg (R)	Isaac N. Morris (D)	Charles D. Hodges (D)	Aaron Shaw (D)	Robert Smith (D)	Samuel S. Marshall (D)
36th (1859–1861)	Elihu Washburne (R)	John F. Farnsworth (R)	Owen Lovejoy (R)	William; Kellogg (R)	Isaac N. Morris (D)	John A. McClernand (D)	James Carroll; Robinson (D)	Philip B. Fouke (D)	John A. Logan (D)
37th (1861–1863)	Elihu Washburne (R)	Isaac N. Arnold (R)	Owen Lovejoy (R)	William; Kellogg (R)	William Alexander; Richardson (D)	John A. McClernand (D)	James Carroll; Robinson (D)	Philip B. Fouke (D)	John A. Logan (D)
37th (1861–1863)	Elihu Washburne (R)	Isaac N. Arnold (R)	Owen Lovejoy (R)	William; Kellogg (R)	William Alexander; Richardson (D)	Anthony L. Knapp (D)	James Carroll; Robinson (D)	Philip B. Fouke (D)	William J. Allen (D)

=== 1863–1873: 14 seats ===
Following the 1860 census, Illinois was apportioned 14 seats, 13 of which were elected from single member districts and 1 elected at-large statewide.

Congress	District													At-large
Congress	1st	2nd	3rd	4th	5th	6th	7th	8th	9th	10th	11th	12th	13th	At-large
38th (1863–1865)	Isaac N. Arnold (R)	John F. Farnsworth (R)	Elihu B. Washburne (R)	Charles M. Harris (D)	Owen; Lovejoy (R)	Jesse O. Norton (R)	John R. Eden (D)	John T. Stuart (D)	Lewis W. Ross (D)	Anthony L. Knapp (D)	James Carroll; Robinson (D)	William Ralls; Morrison (D)	William J. Allen (D)	James C. Allen (D)
38th (1863–1865)	Isaac N. Arnold (R)	John F. Farnsworth (R)	Elihu B. Washburne (R)	Charles M. Harris (D)	Ebon C. Ingersoll (R)	Jesse O. Norton (R)	John R. Eden (D)	John T. Stuart (D)	Lewis W. Ross (D)	Anthony L. Knapp (D)	James Carroll; Robinson (D)	William Ralls; Morrison (D)	William J. Allen (D)	James C. Allen (D)
39th (1865–1867)	John; Wentworth (R)	John F. Farnsworth (R)	Elihu B. Washburne (R)	Abner C. Harding (R)	Ebon C. Ingersoll (R)	Burton C. Cook (R)	Henry P. H. Bromwell (R)	Shelby M. Cullom (R)	Lewis W. Ross (D)	Anthony; Thornton (D)	Samuel S. Marshall (D)	Jehu; Baker (R)	Andrew J. Kuykendall (R)	Samuel W. Moulton (R)
40th (1867–1869)	Norman B. Judd (R)	John F. Farnsworth (R)	Elihu B. Washburne (R)	Abner C. Harding (R)	Ebon C. Ingersoll (R)	Burton C. Cook (R)	Henry P. H. Bromwell (R)	Shelby M. Cullom (R)	Lewis W. Ross (D)	Albert G. Burr (D)	Samuel S. Marshall (D)	Jehu; Baker (R)	Green B. Raum (R)	John A. Logan (R)
41st (1869–1871)	Norman B. Judd (R)	John F. Farnsworth (R)	Horatio C. Burchard (R)	John B. Hawley (R)	Ebon C. Ingersoll (R)	Burton C. Cook (R)	Jesse H. Moore (R)	Shelby M. Cullom (R)	Thompson W. McNeely (D)	Albert G. Burr (D)	Samuel S. Marshall (D)	John B. Hay (R)	John M. Crebs (D)	John A. Logan (R)
42nd (1871–1873)	Charles B. Farwell (R)	John F. Farnsworth (R)	Horatio C. Burchard (R)	John B. Hawley (R)	Bradford N. Stevens (D)	Henry; Snapp (R)	Jesse H. Moore (R)	James Carroll; Robinson (D)	Thompson W. McNeely (D)	Edward Y. Rice (D)	Samuel S. Marshall (D)	John B. Hay (R)	John M. Crebs (D)	John Lourie; Beveridge (R)

=== 1873–1883: 19 seats ===
Following the 1870 census, Illinois was apportioned 19 seats, all elected via single member districts.

Congress	District										District								
Congress	1st	2nd	3rd	4th	5th	6th	7th	8th	9th	10th	11th	12th	13th	14th	15th	16th	17th	18th	19th
43rd (1873–1875)	John Blake Rice (R)	Jasper D. Ward (R)	Charles B. Farwell (R)	Stephen A. Hurlbut (R)	Horatio C. Burchard (R)	John B. Hawley (R)	Franklin Corwin (R)	Greenbury L. Fort (R)	Granville Barrere (R)	William H. Ray (R)	Robert M. Knapp (D)	James Carroll; Robinson (D)	John McNulta (R)	Joe Cannon (R)	John R. Eden (D)	James S. Martin (R)	William Ralls; Morrison (D)	Isaac Clements (R)	Samuel S. Marshall (D)
44th (1875–1877)	Bernard G. Caulfield (D)	Carter Harrison III (D)	Charles B. Farwell (R)	Stephen A. Hurlbut (R)	Horatio C. Burchard (R)	Thomas J. Henderson (R)	Alexander Campbell (I)	Greenbury L. Fort (R)	Richard H. Whiting (R)	John C. Bagby (D)	Scott Wike (D)	William; Springer (D)	Adlai Stevenson I (D)	Joe Cannon (R)	John R. Eden (D)	William A. J. Sparks (D)	William Ralls; Morrison (D)	William Hartzell (D)	William B. Anderson (I)
44th (1875–1877)	Bernard G. Caulfield (D)	Carter Harrison III (D)	John V. Le Moyne (D)	Stephen A. Hurlbut (R)	Horatio C. Burchard (R)	Thomas J. Henderson (R)	Alexander Campbell (I)	Greenbury L. Fort (R)	Richard H. Whiting (R)	John C. Bagby (D)	Scott Wike (D)	William; Springer (D)	Adlai Stevenson I (D)	Joe Cannon (R)	John R. Eden (D)	William A. J. Sparks (D)	William Ralls; Morrison (D)	William Hartzell (D)	William B. Anderson (I)
45th (1877–1879)	William Aldrich (R)	Carter Harrison III (D)	Lorenzo Brentano (R)	William Lathrop (R)	Horatio C. Burchard (R)	Thomas J. Henderson (R)	Philip C. Hayes (R)	Greenbury L. Fort (R)	Thomas A. Boyd (R)	Benjamin F. Marsh (R)	Robert M. Knapp (D)	William; Springer (D)	Thomas F. Tipton (R)	Joe Cannon (R)	John R. Eden (D)	William A. J. Sparks (D)	William Ralls; Morrison (D)	William Hartzell (D)	Richard W. Townshend (D)
46th (1879–1881)	William Aldrich (R)	George R. Davis (R)	Hiram Barber Jr. (R)	John C. Sherwin (R)	Robert M. A. Hawk (R)	Thomas J. Henderson (R)	Philip C. Hayes (R)	Greenbury L. Fort (R)	Thomas A. Boyd (R)	Benjamin F. Marsh (R)	James W. Singleton (D)	William; Springer (D)	Adlai Stevenson I (D)	Joe Cannon (R)	Albert P. Forsythe (GB)	William A. J. Sparks (D)	William Ralls; Morrison (D)	John R. Thomas (R)	Richard W. Townshend (D)
47th (1881–1883)	William Aldrich (R)	George R. Davis (R)	Charles B. Farwell (R)	John C. Sherwin (R)	Robert M. A. Hawk (R)	Thomas J. Henderson (R)	William Cullen (R)	Lewis E. Payson (R)	John H. Lewis (R)	Benjamin F. Marsh (R)	James W. Singleton (D)	William; Springer (D)	Dietrich C. Smith (R)	Joe Cannon (R)	Samuel W. Moulton (D)	William A. J. Sparks (D)	William Ralls; Morrison (D)	John R. Thomas (R)	Richard W. Townshend (D)
47th (1881–1883)	William Aldrich (R)	George R. Davis (R)	Charles B. Farwell (R)	John C. Sherwin (R)	Robert R. Hitt (R)	Thomas J. Henderson (R)	William Cullen (R)	Lewis E. Payson (R)	John H. Lewis (R)	Benjamin F. Marsh (R)	James W. Singleton (D)	William; Springer (D)	Dietrich C. Smith (R)	Joe Cannon (R)	Samuel W. Moulton (D)	William A. J. Sparks (D)	William Ralls; Morrison (D)	John R. Thomas (R)	Richard W. Townshend (D)

=== 1883–1893: 20 seats ===
Following the 1860 census, Illinois was apportioned 20 seats.

Congress	District										District									
Congress	1st	2nd	3rd	4th	5th	6th	7th	8th	9th	10th	11th	12th	13th	14th	15th	16th	17th	18th	19th	20th
48th (1883–1885)	Ransom W. Dunham (R)	John F. Finerty (ID)	George R. Davis (R)	George E. Adams (R)	Reuben Ellwood (R)	Robert R. Hitt (R)	Thomas J. Henderson (R)	William Cullen (R)	Lewis E. Payson (R)	Nicholas E. Worthington (D)	William H. Neece (D)	James M. Riggs (D)	William Springer (D)	Jonathan H. Rowell (R)	Joe Cannon (R)	Aaron Shaw (D)	Samuel W. Moulton (D)	William Ralls Morrison (D)	Richard W. Townshend (D)	John R. Thomas (R)
49th (1885–1887)	Ransom W. Dunham (R)	Frank Lawler (D)	James Hugh Ward (D)	George E. Adams (R)	Albert J. Hopkins (R)	Robert R. Hitt (R)	Thomas J. Henderson (R)	Ralph Plumb (R)	Lewis E. Payson (R)	Nicholas E. Worthington (D)	William H. Neece (D)	James M. Riggs (D)	William Springer (D)	Jonathan H. Rowell (R)	Joe Cannon (R)	Silas Z. Landes (D)	John R. Eden (D)	William Ralls Morrison (D)	Richard W. Townshend (D)	John R. Thomas (R)
50th (1887–1889)	Ransom W. Dunham (R)	Frank Lawler (D)	William E. Mason (R)	George E. Adams (R)	Albert J. Hopkins (R)	Robert R. Hitt (R)	Thomas J. Henderson (R)	Ralph Plumb (R)	Lewis E. Payson (R)	Philip S. Post (R)	William H. Gest (R)	George A. Anderson (D)	William Springer (D)	Jonathan H. Rowell (R)	Joe Cannon (R)	Silas Z. Landes (D)	Edward Lane (D)	Jehu Baker (R)	Richard W. Townshend (D)	John R. Thomas (R)
51st (1889–1891)	Abner Taylor (R)	Frank Lawler (D)	William E. Mason (R)	George E. Adams (R)	Albert J. Hopkins (R)	Robert R. Hitt (R)	Thomas J. Henderson (R)	Charles A. Hill (R)	Lewis E. Payson (R)	Philip S. Post (R)	William H. Gest (R)	Scott Wike (D)	William Springer (D)	Jonathan H. Rowell (R)	Joe Cannon (R)	George W. Fithian (D)	Edward Lane (D)	William S. Forman (D)	James R. Williams (D)	George W. Smith (R)
52nd (1891–1893)	Abner Taylor (R)	Lawrence McGann (D)	Allan C. Durborow Jr. (D)	Walter C. Newberry (D)	Albert J. Hopkins (R)	Robert R. Hitt (R)	Thomas J. Henderson (R)	Lewis Steward (D)	Herman W. Snow (D)	Philip S. Post (R)	Benjamin T. Cable (D)	Scott Wike (D)	William Springer (D)	Owen Scott (D)	Samuel T. Busey (D)	George W. Fithian (D)	Edward Lane (D)	William S. Forman (D)	James R. Williams (D)	George W. Smith (R)

=== 1893–1903: 22 seats ===
Following the 1890 census, Illinois was apportioned 22 seats. Until 1895, 20 seats were elected from single member districts and 2 were elected at-large statewide. In 1895, Illinois redistricted all of its seats.

Congress	District										District										At-large	
Congress	1st	2nd	3rd	4th	5th	6th	7th	8th	9th	10th	11th	12th	13th	14th	15th	16th	17th	18th	19th	20th	Seat A	Seat B
53rd (1893–1895)	J. Frank Aldrich (R)	Lawrence McGann (D)	Allan C. Durborow Jr. (D)	Julius Goldzier (D)	Albert J. Hopkins (R)	Robert R. Hitt (R)	Thomas J. Henderson (R)	Robert A. Childs (R)	Hamilton K. Wheeler (R)	Philip S. Post (R)	Benjamin F. Marsh (R)	John J. McDannold (D)	William Springer (D)	Benjamin F. Funk (R)	Joe Cannon (R)	George W. Fithian (D)	Edward Lane (D)	William S. Forman (D)	James R. Williams (D)	George W. Smith (R)	John C. Black (D)	Andrew J. Hunter (D)
54th (1895–1897)	J. Frank Aldrich (R)	William Lorimer (R)	Lawrence McGann (D)	Charles W. Woodman (R)	George E. White (R)	Edward D. Cooke (R)	George E. Foss (R)	Albert J. Hopkins (R)	Robert R. Hitt (R)	George W. Prince (R)	Walter Reeves (R)	Joe Cannon (R)	Vespasian Warner (R)	Joseph V. Graff (R)	Benjamin F. Marsh (R)	Finis E. Downing (D)	James A. Connolly (R)	Frederick Remann (R)	Benson Wood (R)	Orlando Burrell (R)	21st district	22nd district
54th (1895–1897)	J. Frank Aldrich (R)	William Lorimer (R)	Hugh R. Belknap (R)	Charles W. Woodman (R)	George E. White (R)	Edward D. Cooke (R)	George E. Foss (R)	Albert J. Hopkins (R)	Robert R. Hitt (R)	George W. Prince (R)	Walter Reeves (R)	Joe Cannon (R)	Vespasian Warner (R)	Joseph V. Graff (R)	Benjamin F. Marsh (R)	John I. Rinaker (R)	James A. Connolly (R)	William Hadley (R)	Benson Wood (R)	Orlando Burrell (R)	Everett Murphy (R)	George W. Smith (R)
55th (1897–1899)	James Robert Mann (R)	William Lorimer (R)	Hugh R. Belknap (R)	Daniel W. Mills (R)	George E. White (R)	Henry S. Boutell (R)	George E. Foss (R)	Albert J. Hopkins (R)	Robert R. Hitt (R)	George W. Prince (R)	Walter Reeves (R)	Joe Cannon (R)	Vespasian Warner (R)	Joseph V. Graff (R)	Benjamin F. Marsh (R)	William H. Hinrichsen (D)	James A. Connolly (R)	Thomas M. Jett (D)	Andrew J. Hunter (D)	James R. Campbell (D)	Jehu Baker (D)	George W. Smith (R)
56th (1899–1901)	James Robert Mann (R)	William Lorimer (R)	George Peter Foster (D)	Thomas Cusack (D)	Edward T. Noonan (D)	Henry S. Boutell (R)	George E. Foss (R)	Albert J. Hopkins (R)	Robert R. Hitt (R)	George W. Prince (R)	Walter Reeves (R)	Joe Cannon (R)	Vespasian Warner (R)	Joseph V. Graff (R)	Benjamin F. Marsh (R)	William E. Williams (D)	Ben F. Caldwell (D)	Thomas M. Jett (D)	Joseph B. Crowley (D)	James R. Williams (D)	William Rodenberg (R)	George W. Smith (R)
57th (1901–1903)	James Robert Mann (R)	John J. Feely (D)	George Peter Foster (D)	James McAndrews (D)	William F. Mahoney (D)	Henry S. Boutell (R)	George E. Foss (R)	Albert J. Hopkins (R)	Robert R. Hitt (R)	George W. Prince (R)	Walter Reeves (R)	Joe Cannon (R)	Vespasian Warner (R)	Joseph V. Graff (R)	J. Ross Mickey (D)	Thomas J. Selby (D)	Ben F. Caldwell (D)	Thomas M. Jett (D)	Joseph B. Crowley (D)	James R. Williams (D)	Fred J. Kern (D)	George W. Smith (R)

=== 1903–1913: 25 seats ===
Following the 1900 census, Illinois was apportioned 25 seats.

Congress
58th
(1903–1905)
59th
(1905–1907)
60th
(1907–1909)
61st
(1909–1911)
62nd
(1911–1913)

District										District										District					Congress
1st	2nd	3rd	4th	5th	6th	7th	8th	9th	10th	11th	12th	13th	14th	15th	16th	17th	18th	19th	20th	21st	22nd	23rd	24th	25th	Congress
Martin; Emerich (D)	James; R. Mann (R)	William; W. Wilson (R)	George P. Foster (D)	James; McAndrews (D)	William; Lorimer (R)	Philip; Knopf (R)	William F. Mahoney (D)	Henry; S. Boutell (R)	George; E. Foss (R)	Howard M. Snapp (R)	Charles; E. Fuller (R)	Robert R. Hitt (R)	Benjamin F. Marsh (R)	George; W. Prince (R)	Joseph V. Graff (R)	John; A. Sterling (R)	Joe; Cannon (R)	Vespasian; Warner (R)	Henry; T. Rainey (D)	Ben F. Caldwell (D)	William A. Rodenberg (R)	Joseph B. Crowley (D)	James R. Williams (D)	George W. Smith (R)	58th (1903–1905)
Martin B. Madden (R)	James; R. Mann (R)	William; W. Wilson (R)	Charles S. Wharton (R)	Anthony; Michalek (R)	William; Lorimer (R)	Philip; Knopf (R)	Charles; McGavin (R)	Henry; S. Boutell (R)	George; E. Foss (R)	Howard M. Snapp (R)	Charles; E. Fuller (R)	Robert R. Hitt (R)	James; McKinney (R)	George; W. Prince (R)	Joseph V. Graff (R)	John; A. Sterling (R)	Joe; Cannon (R)	William B. McKinley (R)	Henry; T. Rainey (D)	Zeno J. Rives (R)	William A. Rodenberg (R)	Frank S. Dickson (R)	Pleasant T. Chapman (R)	George W. Smith (R)	59th (1905–1907)
Martin B. Madden (R)	James; R. Mann (R)	William; W. Wilson (R)	James T. McDermott (D)	Adolph J. Sabath (D)	William; Lorimer (R)	Philip; Knopf (R)	Charles; McGavin (R)	Henry; S. Boutell (R)	George; E. Foss (R)	Howard M. Snapp (R)	Charles; E. Fuller (R)	Frank O. Lowden (R)	James; McKinney (R)	George; W. Prince (R)	Joseph V. Graff (R)	John; A. Sterling (R)	Joe; Cannon (R)	William B. McKinley (R)	Henry; T. Rainey (D)	Ben F. Caldwell (D)	William A. Rodenberg (R)	Martin D. Foster (D)	Pleasant T. Chapman (R)	George W. Smith (R)	60th (1907–1909)
Martin B. Madden (R)	James; R. Mann (R)	William; W. Wilson (R)	James T. McDermott (D)	Adolph J. Sabath (D)	William; Lorimer (R)	Philip; Knopf (R)	Charles; McGavin (R)	Henry; S. Boutell (R)	George; E. Foss (R)	Howard M. Snapp (R)	Charles; E. Fuller (R)	Frank O. Lowden (R)	James; McKinney (R)	George; W. Prince (R)	Joseph V. Graff (R)	John; A. Sterling (R)	Joe; Cannon (R)	William B. McKinley (R)	Henry; T. Rainey (D)	Ben F. Caldwell (D)	William A. Rodenberg (R)	Martin D. Foster (D)	Pleasant T. Chapman (R)	Napoleon B. Thistlewood (R)	60th (1907–1909)
Martin B. Madden (R)	James; R. Mann (R)	William; W. Wilson (R)	James T. McDermott (D)	Adolph J. Sabath (D)	William; Moxley (R)	Frederick; Lundin (R)	Thomas; Gallagher (D)	Henry; S. Boutell (R)	George; E. Foss (R)	Howard M. Snapp (R)	Charles; E. Fuller (R)	Frank O. Lowden (R)	James; McKinney (R)	George; W. Prince (R)	Joseph V. Graff (R)	John; A. Sterling (R)	Joe; Cannon (R)	William B. McKinley (R)	Henry; T. Rainey (D)	James M. Graham (D)	William A. Rodenberg (R)	Martin D. Foster (D)	Pleasant T. Chapman (R)	Napoleon B. Thistlewood (R)	61st (1909–1911)
Martin B. Madden (R)	James; R. Mann (R)	William; W. Wilson (R)	James T. McDermott (D)	Adolph J. Sabath (D)	Edmund J. Stack (D)	Frank; Buchanan (D)	Thomas; Gallagher (D)	Lynden; Evans (D)	George; E. Foss (R)	Ira C. Copley (R)	Charles; E. Fuller (R)	John C. McKenzie (R)	James; McKinney (R)	George; W. Prince (R)	Claude U. Stone (D)	John; A. Sterling (R)	Joe; Cannon (R)	William B. McKinley (R)	Henry; T. Rainey (D)	James M. Graham (D)	William A. Rodenberg (R)	Martin D. Foster (D)	H. Robert; Fowler (D)	Napoleon B. Thistlewood (R)	62nd (1911–1913)

=== 1913–1943: 27 seats ===
Following the 1910 census, Illinois was apportioned 27 seats, 25 of which were elected from single member districts and 2 were elected at-large statewide.

Congress
63rd
(1913–1915)
64th
(1915–1917)
65th
(1917–1919)
66th
(1919–1921)
67th
(1921–1923)
68th
(1923–1925)
69th
(1925–1927)
70th
(1927–1929)
71st
(1929–1931)
72nd
(1931–1933)
73rd
(1933–1935)
74th
(1935–1937)
75th
(1937–1939)
76th
(1939–1941)
77th
(1941–1943)
Congress

District										District										District					At-large		Congress
1st	2nd	3rd	4th	5th	6th	7th	8th	9th	10th	11th	12th	13th	14th	15th	16th	17th	18th	19th	20th	21st	22nd	23rd	24th	25th	Seat A	Seat B	Congress
Martin; B. Madden (R)	James; Robert; Mann (R)	George E. Gorman (D)	James T. McDermott (D)	Adolph; J. Sabath (D)	James; McAndrews (D)	Frank; Buchanan (D)	Thomas; Gallagher (D)	Frederick; A. Britten (R)	Charles Thom- son (Prog)	Ira C. Copley (R)	William Hine- baugh (Prog)	John C. McKenzie (R)	Clyde H. Tavenner (D)	Stephen A. Hoxworth (D)	Claude; U. Stone (D)	Louis; FitzHenry (D)	Frank T. O'Hair (D)	Charles M. Borchers (D)	Henry; T. Rainey (D)	James M. Graham (D)	William N. Baltz (D)	Martin; D. Foster (D)	H. Robert; Fowler (D)	Robert P. Hill (D)	Lawrence B. Stringer (D)	William E. Williams (D)	63rd (1913–1915)
Martin; B. Madden (R)	James; Robert; Mann (R)	William; Warfield; Wilson (R)	James T. McDermott (D)	Adolph; J. Sabath (D)	James; McAndrews (D)	Frank; Buchanan (D)	Thomas; Gallagher (D)	Frederick; A. Britten (R)	George; E. Foss (R)	Ira C. Copley (Prog)	Charles; Eugene; Fuller (R)	John C. McKenzie (R)	Clyde H. Tavenner (D)	Edward; John; King (R)	Claude; U. Stone (D)	John A. Sterling (R)	Joe; Cannon (R)	William B. McKinley (R)	Henry; T. Rainey (D)	Loren E. Wheeler (R)	William A. Rodenberg (R)	Martin; D. Foster (D)	Thomas; Sutler; Williams (R)	Edward E. Denison (R)	Burnett M. Chiperfield (R)	William E. Williams (D)	64th (1915–1917)
Martin; B. Madden (R)	James; Robert; Mann (R)	William; Warfield; Wilson (R)	C. Martin (D)	Adolph; J. Sabath (D)	James; McAndrews (D)	Niels; Juul (R)	Thomas; Gallagher (D)	Frederick; A. Britten (R)	George; E. Foss (R)	Ira C. Copley (R)	Charles; Eugene; Fuller (R)	John C. McKenzie (R)	William J. Graham (R)	Edward; John; King (R)	Clifford; C. Ireland (R)	John A. Sterling (R)	Joe; Cannon (R)	William B. McKinley (R)	Henry; T. Rainey (D)	Loren E. Wheeler (R)	William A. Rodenberg (R)	Martin; D. Foster (D)	Thomas; Sutler; Williams (R)	Edward E. Denison (R)	Medill; McCormick (R)	William E. Mason (R)	65th (1917–1919)
Martin; B. Madden (R)	James; Robert; Mann (R)	William; Warfield; Wilson (R)	John W. Rainey (D)	Adolph; J. Sabath (D)	James; McAndrews (D)	Niels; Juul (R)	Thomas; Gallagher (D)	Frederick; A. Britten (R)	George; E. Foss (R)	Ira C. Copley (R)	Charles; Eugene; Fuller (R)	John C. McKenzie (R)	William J. Graham (R)	Edward; John; King (R)	Clifford; C. Ireland (R)	John A. Sterling (R)	Joe; Cannon (R)	William B. McKinley (R)	Henry; T. Rainey (D)	Loren E. Wheeler (R)	William A. Rodenberg (R)	Martin; D. Foster (D)	Thomas; Sutler; Williams (R)	Edward E. Denison (R)	Medill; McCormick (R)	William E. Mason (R)	65th (1917–1919)
Martin; B. Madden (R)	James; Robert; Mann (R)	William; Warfield; Wilson (R)	John W. Rainey (D)	Adolph; J. Sabath (D)	James; McAndrews (D)	Niels; Juul (R)	Thomas; Gallagher (D)	Frederick; A. Britten (R)	Carl R. Chindblom (R)	Ira C. Copley (R)	Charles; Eugene; Fuller (R)	John C. McKenzie (R)	William J. Graham (R)	Edward; John; King (R)	Clifford; C. Ireland (R)	Frank L. Smith (R)	Joe; Cannon (R)	William B. McKinley (R)	Henry; T. Rainey (D)	Loren E. Wheeler (R)	William A. Rodenberg (R)	Edwin B. Brooks (R)	Thomas; Sutler; Williams (R)	Edward E. Denison (R)	Richard; Yates Jr. (R)	William E. Mason (R)	66th (1919–1921)
Martin; B. Madden (R)	James; Robert; Mann (R)	Elliott W. Sproul (R)	John W. Rainey (D)	Adolph; J. Sabath (D)	John J. Gorman (R)	M. Alfred; Michaelson (R)	Stanley H. Kunz (D)	Frederick; A. Britten (R)	Carl R. Chindblom (R)	Ira C. Copley (R)	Charles; Eugene; Fuller (R)	John C. McKenzie (R)	William J. Graham (R)	Edward; John; King (R)	Clifford; C. Ireland (R)	Frank H. Funk (R)	Joe; Cannon (R)	Allen F. Moore (R)	Guy L. Shaw (R)	Loren E. Wheeler (R)	William A. Rodenberg (R)	Edwin B. Brooks (R)	Thomas; Sutler; Williams (R)	Edward E. Denison (R)	Richard; Yates Jr. (R)	Winnifred; Mason Huck (R)	67th (1921–1923)
Martin; B. Madden (R)	Morton D. Hull (R)	Elliott W. Sproul (R)	Thomas A. Doyle (D)	Adolph; J. Sabath (D)	James R. Buckley (D)	M. Alfred; Michaelson (R)	Stanley H. Kunz (D)	Frederick; A. Britten (R)	Carl R. Chindblom (R)	Frank R. Reid (R)	Charles; Eugene; Fuller (R)	John C. McKenzie (R)	William J. Graham (R)	Edward; John; King (R)	William; E. Hull (R)	Frank H. Funk (R)	William P. Holaday (R)	Allen F. Moore (R)	Henry; T. Rainey (D)	James Earl; Major (D)	Edward E. Miller (R)	William; W. Arnold (D)	Thomas; Sutler; Williams (R)	Edward E. Denison (R)	Richard; Yates Jr. (R)	Henry R. Rathbone (R)	68th (1923–1925)
Martin; B. Madden (R)	Morton D. Hull (R)	Elliott W. Sproul (R)	Thomas A. Doyle (D)	Adolph; J. Sabath (D)	John J. Gorman (R)	M. Alfred; Michaelson (R)	Stanley H. Kunz (D)	Frederick; A. Britten (R)	Carl R. Chindblom (R)	Frank R. Reid (R)	Charles; Eugene; Fuller (R)	William; Richard; Johnson (R)	John; Clayton; Allen (R)	Edward; John; King (R)	William; E. Hull (R)	Frank H. Funk (R)	William P. Holaday (R)	Charles; Adkins (R)	Henry; T. Rainey (D)	Loren E. Wheeler (R)	Edward M. Irwin (R)	William; W. Arnold (D)	Thomas; Sutler; Williams (R)	Edward E. Denison (R)	Richard; Yates Jr. (R)	Henry R. Rathbone (R)	69th (1925–1927)
Martin; B. Madden (R)	Morton D. Hull (R)	Elliott W. Sproul (R)	Thomas A. Doyle (D)	Adolph; J. Sabath (D)	James T. Igoe (D)	M. Alfred; Michaelson (R)	Stanley H. Kunz (D)	Frederick; A. Britten (R)	Carl R. Chindblom (R)	Frank R. Reid (R)	John T. Buckbee (R)	William; Richard; Johnson (R)	John; Clayton; Allen (R)	Edward; John; King (R)	William; E. Hull (R)	Homer W. Hall (R)	William P. Holaday (R)	Charles; Adkins (R)	Henry; T. Rainey (D)	James Earl; Major (D)	Edward M. Irwin (R)	William; W. Arnold (D)	Thomas; Sutler; Williams (R)	Edward E. Denison (R)	Richard; Yates Jr. (R)	Henry R. Rathbone (R)	70th (1927–1929)
Oscar; Stanton; De; Priest (R)	Morton D. Hull (R)	Elliott W. Sproul (R)	Thomas A. Doyle (D)	Adolph; J. Sabath (D)	James T. Igoe (D)	M. Alfred; Michaelson (R)	Stanley H. Kunz (D)	Frederick; A. Britten (R)	Carl R. Chindblom (R)	Frank R. Reid (R)	John T. Buckbee (R)	William; Richard; Johnson (R)	John; Clayton; Allen (R)	Burnett M. Chiperfield (R)	William; E. Hull (R)	Homer W. Hall (R)	William P. Holaday (R)	Charles; Adkins (R)	Henry; T. Rainey (D)	Frank M. Ramey (R)	Edward M. Irwin (R)	William; W. Arnold (D)	Thomas; Sutler; Williams (R)	Edward E. Denison (R)	Richard; Yates Jr. (R)	Ruth Hanna; McCormick (R)	71st (1929–1931)
Oscar; Stanton; De; Priest (R)	Morton D. Hull (R)	Edward A. Kelly (D)	Harry P. Beam (D)	Adolph; J. Sabath (D)	James T. Igoe (D)	Leonard W. Schuetz (D)	P. C. Granata (R)	Frederick; A. Britten (R)	Carl R. Chindblom (R)	Frank R. Reid (R)	John T. Buckbee (R)	William; Richard; Johnson (R)	John; Clayton; Allen (R)	Burnett M. Chiperfield (R)	William; E. Hull (R)	Homer W. Hall (R)	William P. Holaday (R)	Charles; Adkins (R)	Henry; T. Rainey (D)	James; Earl; Major (D)	Charles A. Karch (D)	William; W. Arnold (D)	Claude V. Parsons (D)	Kent E. Keller (D)	Richard; Yates Jr. (R)	William H. Dieterich (D)	72nd (1931–1933)
Oscar; Stanton; De; Priest (R)	Morton D. Hull (R)	Edward A. Kelly (D)	Harry P. Beam (D)	Adolph; J. Sabath (D)	James T. Igoe (D)	Leonard W. Schuetz (D)	S. H. Kunz (D)	Frederick; A. Britten (R)	Carl R. Chindblom (R)	Frank R. Reid (R)	John T. Buckbee (R)	William; Richard; Johnson (R)	John; Clayton; Allen (R)	Burnett M. Chiperfield (R)	William; E. Hull (R)	Homer W. Hall (R)	William P. Holaday (R)	Charles; Adkins (R)	Henry; T. Rainey (D)	James; Earl; Major (D)	Charles A. Karch (D)	William; W. Arnold (D)	Claude V. Parsons (D)	Kent E. Keller (D)	Richard; Yates Jr. (R)	William H. Dieterich (D)	72nd (1931–1933)
Oscar; Stanton; De; Priest (R)	P. H. Moynihan (R)	Edward A. Kelly (D)	Harry P. Beam (D)	Adolph; J. Sabath (D)	Thomas J. O'Brien (D)	Leonard W. Schuetz (D)	Leo; Kocialkowski (D)	Frederick; A. Britten (R)	James; Simpson Jr. (R)	Frank R. Reid (R)	John T. Buckbee (R)	Leo E. Allen (R)	Chester C. Thompson (D)	J. Leroy; Adair (D)	Everett; Dirksen (R)	Frank; Gillespie (D)	James A. Meeks (D)	Donald C. Dobbins (D)	Henry; T. Rainey (D)	James; Earl; Major (D)	Edwin M. Schaefer (D)	William; W. Arnold (D)	Claude V. Parsons (D)	Kent E. Keller (D)	Martin A. Brennan (D)	Walter; Nesbit (D)	73rd (1933–1935)
Arthur; Wergs; Mitchell (D)	Raymond S. McKeough (D)	Edward A. Kelly (D)	Harry P. Beam (D)	Adolph; J. Sabath (D)	Thomas J. O'Brien (D)	Leonard W. Schuetz (D)	Leo; Kocialkowski (D)	James; McAndrews (D)	Ralph E. Church (R)	Chauncey W. Reed (R)	John T. Buckbee (R)	Leo E. Allen (R)	Chester C. Thompson (D)	J. Leroy; Adair (D)	Everett; Dirksen (R)	Leslie C. Arends (R)	James A. Meeks (D)	Donald C. Dobbins (D)	Scott W. Lucas (D)	Harry H. Mason (D)	Edwin M. Schaefer (D)	William; W. Arnold (D)	Claude V. Parsons (D)	Kent E. Keller (D)	Martin A. Brennan (D)	Michael L. Igoe (D)	74th (1935–1937)
Arthur; Wergs; Mitchell (D)	Raymond S. McKeough (D)	Edward A. Kelly (D)	Harry P. Beam (D)	Adolph; J. Sabath (D)	Thomas J. O'Brien (D)	Leonard W. Schuetz (D)	Leo; Kocialkowski (D)	James; McAndrews (D)	Ralph E. Church (R)	Chauncey W. Reed (R)	Noah M. Mason (R)	Leo E. Allen (R)	Chester C. Thompson (D)	Lewis L. Boyer (D)	Everett; Dirksen (R)	Leslie C. Arends (R)	James A. Meeks (D)	Hugh M. Rigney (D)	Scott W. Lucas (D)	Frank W. Fries (D)	Edwin M. Schaefer (D)	William; W. Arnold (D)	Claude V. Parsons (D)	Kent E. Keller (D)	Edwin V. Champion (D)	Lewis M. Long (D)	75th (1937–1939)
Arthur; Wergs; Mitchell (D)	Raymond S. McKeough (D)	Edward A. Kelly (D)	Harry P. Beam (D)	Adolph; J. Sabath (D)	A. F. Maciejewski (D)	Leonard W. Schuetz (D)	Leo; Kocialkowski (D)	James; McAndrews (D)	Ralph E. Church (R)	Chauncey W. Reed (R)	Noah M. Mason (R)	Leo E. Allen (R)	Anton J. Johnson (R)	Robert B. Chiperfield (R)	Everett; Dirksen (R)	Leslie C. Arends (R)	Jessie; Sumner (R)	Bill; Wheat (R)	James M. Barnes (D)	Frank W. Fries (D)	Edwin M. Schaefer (D)	Laurence; F. Arnold (D)	Claude V. Parsons (D)	Kent E. Keller (D)	John C. Martin (D)	T. V. Smith (D)	76th (1939–1941)
Arthur; Wergs; Mitchell (D)	Raymond S. McKeough (D)	Edward A. Kelly (D)	Harry P. Beam (D)	Adolph; J. Sabath (D)	A. F. Maciejewski (D)	Leonard W. Schuetz (D)	Leo; Kocialkowski (D)	Charles S. Dewey (R)	George A. Paddock (R)	Chauncey W. Reed (R)	Noah M. Mason (R)	Leo E. Allen (R)	Anton J. Johnson (R)	Robert B. Chiperfield (R)	Everett; Dirksen (R)	Leslie C. Arends (R)	Jessie; Sumner (R)	Bill; Wheat (R)	James M. Barnes (D)	George Evan; Howell (R)	Edwin M. Schaefer (D)	Laurence; F. Arnold (D)	James V. Heidinger (R)	C. W. Bishop (R)	Stephen A. Day (R)	William; Stratton (R)	77th (1941–1943)
1st	2nd	3rd	4th	5th	6th	7th	8th	9th	10th	11th	12th	13th	14th	15th	16th	17th	18th	19th	20th	21st	22nd	23rd	24th	25th	Seat A	Seat B	Congress
District										District										District					At-large		Congress

=== 1943–1953: 26 seats ===
Following the 1940 census, Illinois was apportioned 26 seats. Until 1949, 25 seats were elected from single member districts and 1 was elected at-large statewide. From 1949, all 26 seats were redistricted.

Congress
78th
(1943–1945)
79th
(1945–1947)
80th
(1947–1949)
81st
(1949–1951)
82nd
(1951–1953)

District										District										District						Congress
1st	2nd	3rd	4th	5th	6th	7th	8th	9th	10th	11th	12th	13th	14th	15th	16th	17th	18th	19th	20th	21st	22nd	23rd	24th	25th	At-large	Congress
William; L. Dawson (D)	William; A. Rowan (D)	Fred E. Busbey (R)	Martin; Gorski (D)	Adolph J. Sabath (D)	Thomas; J. O'Brien (D)	Leonard W. Schuetz (D)	Thomas; S. Gordon (D)	Charles S. Dewey (R)	Ralph E. Church (R)	Chauncey; W. Reed (R)	Noah M. Mason (R)	Leo E. Allen (R)	Anton J. Johnson (R)	Robert B. Chiperfield (R)	Everett; Dirksen (R)	Leslie; C. Arends (R)	Jessie; Sumner (R)	William H. Wheat (R)	Sid; Simpson (R)	George; Evan; Howell (R)	Calvin D. Johnson (R)	Charles; W. Vursell (R)	James V. Heidinger (R)	C. W. Bishop (R)	Stephen A. Day (R)	78th (1943–1945)
William; L. Dawson (D)	William; A. Rowan (D)	Edward A. Kelly (D)	Martin; Gorski (D)	Adolph J. Sabath (D)	Thomas; J. O'Brien (D)	William W. Link (D)	Thomas; S. Gordon (D)	Alexander J. Resa (D)	Ralph E. Church (R)	Chauncey; W. Reed (R)	Noah M. Mason (R)	Leo E. Allen (R)	Anton J. Johnson (R)	Robert B. Chiperfield (R)	Everett; Dirksen (R)	Leslie; C. Arends (R)	Jessie; Sumner (R)	Rolla C. McMillen (R)	Sid; Simpson (R)	George; Evan; Howell (R)	Melvin; Price (D)	Charles; W. Vursell (R)	James V. Heidinger (R)	C. W. Bishop (R)	Emily Taft; Douglas (D)	79th (1945–1947)
William; L. Dawson (D)	Richard B. Vail (R)	Fred E. Busbey (R)	Martin; Gorski (D)	Adolph J. Sabath (D)	Thomas; J. O'Brien (D)	Thomas L. Owens (R)	Thomas; S. Gordon (D)	Robert; Twyman (R)	Ralph E. Church (R)	Chauncey; W. Reed (R)	Noah M. Mason (R)	Leo E. Allen (R)	Anton J. Johnson (R)	Robert B. Chiperfield (R)	Everett; Dirksen (R)	Leslie; C. Arends (R)	Edward H. Jenison (R)	Rolla C. McMillen (R)	Sid; Simpson (R)	George; Evan; Howell (R)	Melvin; Price (D)	Charles; W. Vursell (R)	Roy; Clippinger (R)	C. W. Bishop (R)	William; Stratton (R)	80th (1947–1949)
William; L. Dawson (D)	Barratt; O'Hara (D)	Neil J. Linehan (D)	James V. Buckley (D)	Martin; Gorski (D)	Thomas; J. O'Brien (D)	Adolph J. Sabath (D)	Thomas; S. Gordon (D)	Sidney R. Yates (D)	Richard; W. Hoffman (R)	Chester A. Chesney (D)	Edgar; A. Jonas (R)	Ralph E. Church (R)	Chauncey; W. Reed (R)	Noah M. Mason (R)	Leo E. Allen (R)	Leslie; C. Arends (R)	Harold H. Velde (R)	Robert B. Chiperfield (R)	Sid; Simpson (R)	Peter F. Mack Jr. (D)	Rolla C. McMillen (R)	Edward; H. Jenison (R)	Charles W. Vursell (R)	Melvin; Price (D)	26th	81st (1949–1951)
William; L. Dawson (D)	Barratt; O'Hara (D)	Neil J. Linehan (D)	James V. Buckley (D)	Martin; Gorski (D)	Thomas; J. O'Brien (D)	Adolph J. Sabath (D)	Thomas; S. Gordon (D)	Sidney R. Yates (D)	Richard; W. Hoffman (R)	Chester A. Chesney (D)	Edgar; A. Jonas (R)	Ralph E. Church (R)	Chauncey; W. Reed (R)	Noah M. Mason (R)	Leo E. Allen (R)	Leslie; C. Arends (R)	Harold H. Velde (R)	Robert B. Chiperfield (R)	Sid; Simpson (R)	Peter F. Mack Jr. (D)	Rolla C. McMillen (R)	Edward; H. Jenison (R)	Charles W. Vursell (R)	Melvin; Price (D)	C. W. Bishop (R)	81st (1949–1951)
William; L. Dawson (D)	Richard B. Vail (R)	Fred E. Busbey (R)	William E. McVey (R)	John C. Kluczynski (D)	Thomas; J. O'Brien (D)	Adolph J. Sabath (D)	Thomas; S. Gordon (D)	Sidney R. Yates (D)	Richard; W. Hoffman (R)	Timothy P. Sheehan (R)	Edgar; A. Jonas (R)	Marguerite; Church (R)	Chauncey; W. Reed (R)	Noah M. Mason (R)	Leo E. Allen (R)	Leslie; C. Arends (R)	Harold H. Velde (R)	Robert B. Chiperfield (R)	Sid; Simpson (R)	Peter F. Mack Jr. (D)	William L. Springer (R)	Edward; H. Jenison (R)	Charles W. Vursell (R)	Melvin; Price (D)	C. W. Bishop (R)	82nd (1951–1953)

=== 1953–1963: 25 seats ===
Following the 1950 census, Illinois was apportioned 25 seats, all of which were elected from single-member districts.

Congress
83rd
(1953–1955)
84th
(1955–1957)
85th
(1957–1959)
86th
(1959–1961)
87th
(1961–1963)

District										District										District					Congress
1st	2nd	3rd	4th	5th	6th	7th	8th	9th	10th	11th	12th	13th	14th	15th	16th	17th	18th	19th	20th	21st	22nd	23rd	24th	25th	Congress
William; L. Dawson (D)	Barratt; O'Hara (D)	Fred E. Busbey (R)	William; E. McVey (R)	John C. Kluczynski (D)	Thomas; J. O'Brien (D)	James; Bowler (D)	Thomas; S. Gordon (D)	Sidney; R. Yates (D)	Richard; W. Hoffman (R)	Timothy; P. Sheehan (R)	Edgar A. Jonas (R)	Marguerite; Church (R)	Chauncey; W. Reed (R)	Noah; M. Mason (R)	Leo E. Allen (R)	Leslie; C. Arends (R)	Harold; H. Velde (R)	Robert B. Chiperfield (R)	Sid; Simpson (R)	Peter; F. Mack; Jr. (D)	William; L. Springer (R)	Charles; W. Vursell (R)	Melvin; Price (D)	C. W. Bishop (R)	83rd (1953–1955)
William; L. Dawson (D)	Barratt; O'Hara (D)	James C. Murray (D)	William; E. McVey (R)	John C. Kluczynski (D)	Thomas; J. O'Brien (D)	James; Bowler (D)	Thomas; S. Gordon (D)	Sidney; R. Yates (D)	Richard; W. Hoffman (R)	Timothy; P. Sheehan (R)	Charles A. Boyle (D)	Marguerite; Church (R)	Chauncey; W. Reed (R)	Noah; M. Mason (R)	Leo E. Allen (R)	Leslie; C. Arends (R)	Harold; H. Velde (R)	Robert B. Chiperfield (R)	Sid; Simpson (R)	Peter; F. Mack; Jr. (D)	William; L. Springer (R)	Charles; W. Vursell (R)	Melvin; Price (D)	Ken; Gray (D)	84th (1955–1957)
William; L. Dawson (D)	Barratt; O'Hara (D)	Emmet; Byrne (R)	William; E. McVey (R)	John C. Kluczynski (D)	Thomas; J. O'Brien (D)	James; Bowler (D)	Thomas; S. Gordon (D)	Sidney; R. Yates (D)	Harold; R. Collier (R)	Timothy; P. Sheehan (R)	Charles A. Boyle (D)	Marguerite; Church (R)	Russell W. Keeney (R)	Noah; M. Mason (R)	Leo E. Allen (R)	Leslie; C. Arends (R)	Bob; Michel (R)	Robert B. Chiperfield (R)	Sid; Simpson (R)	Peter; F. Mack; Jr. (D)	William; L. Springer (R)	Charles; W. Vursell (R)	Melvin; Price (D)	Ken; Gray (D)	85th (1957–1959)
William; L. Dawson (D)	Barratt; O'Hara (D)	William T. Murphy (D)	Ed; Derwinski (R)	John C. Kluczynski (D)	Thomas; J. O'Brien (D)	Roland; V. Libonati (D)	Dan; Rosten- kowski (D)	Sidney; R. Yates (D)	Harold; R. Collier (R)	Roman; Pucinski (D)	Charles A. Boyle (D)	Marguerite; Church (R)	Elmer; Hoffman (R)	Noah; M. Mason (R)	Leo E. Allen (R)	Leslie; C. Arends (R)	Bob; Michel (R)	Robert B. Chiperfield (R)	Edna O. Simpson (R)	Peter; F. Mack; Jr. (D)	William; L. Springer (R)	George; E. Shipley (D)	Melvin; Price (D)	Ken; Gray (D)	86th (1959–1961)
William; L. Dawson (D)	Barratt; O'Hara (D)	William T. Murphy (D)	Ed; Derwinski (R)	John C. Kluczynski (D)	Thomas; J. O'Brien (D)	Roland; V. Libonati (D)	Dan; Rosten- kowski (D)	Sidney; R. Yates (D)	Harold; R. Collier (R)	Roman; Pucinski (D)	Edward R. Finnegan (D)	Marguerite; Church (R)	Elmer; Hoffman (R)	Noah; M. Mason (R)	John B. Anderson (R)	Leslie; C. Arends (R)	Bob; Michel (R)	Robert B. Chiperfield (R)	Paul; Findley (R)	Peter; F. Mack; Jr. (D)	William; L. Springer (R)	George; E. Shipley (D)	Melvin; Price (D)	Ken; Gray (D)	87th (1961–1963)

=== 1963–1983: 24 seats ===
Following the 1960 census, Illinois was apportioned 24 seats.

Congress
88th
(1963–1965)
89th
(1965–1967)
90th
(1967–1969)
91st
(1969–1971)
92nd
(1971–1973)
93rd
(1973–1975)
94th
(1975–1977)
95th
(1977–1979)
96th
(1979–1981)
97th
(1981–1983)

District										District										District				Congress
1st	2nd	3rd	4th	5th	6th	7th	8th	9th	10th	11th	12th	13th	14th	15th	16th	17th	18th	19th	20th	21st	22nd	23rd	24th	Congress
William L. Dawson (D)	Barratt; O'Hara (D)	William T. Murphy (D)	Ed; Derwinski (R)	John C. Kluczynski (D)	Thomas J. O'Brien (D)	Roland V. Libonati (D)	Dan; Rosten- kowski (D)	Edward R. Finnegan (D)	Harold R. Collier (R)	Roman; Pucinski (D)	Bob; McClory (R)	Donald; Rumsfeld (R)	Elmer; Hoffman (R)	Charlotte; Thompson; Reid (R)	John B. Anderson (R)	Leslie; C. Arends (R)	Bob; Michel (R)	Robert T. McLoskey (R)	Paul; Findley (R)	Ken; Gray (D)	William; L. Springer (R)	George; E. Shipley (D)	Melvin; Price (D)	88th (1963–1965)
William L. Dawson (D)	Barratt; O'Hara (D)	William T. Murphy (D)	Ed; Derwinski (R)	John C. Kluczynski (D)	Daniel J. Ronan (D)	Frank; Annunzio (D)	Dan; Rosten- kowski (D)	Sidney R. Yates (D)	Harold R. Collier (R)	Roman; Pucinski (D)	Bob; McClory (R)	Donald; Rumsfeld (R)	John; Erlenborn (R)	Charlotte; Thompson; Reid (R)	John B. Anderson (R)	Leslie; C. Arends (R)	Bob; Michel (R)	Gale; Schisler (D)	Paul; Findley (R)	Ken; Gray (D)	William; L. Springer (R)	George; E. Shipley (D)	Melvin; Price (D)	89th (1965–1967)
William L. Dawson (D)	Barratt; O'Hara (D)	William T. Murphy (D)	Ed; Derwinski (R)	John C. Kluczynski (D)	Daniel J. Ronan (D)	Frank; Annunzio (D)	Dan; Rosten- kowski (D)	Sidney R. Yates (D)	Harold R. Collier (R)	Roman; Pucinski (D)	Bob; McClory (R)	Donald; Rumsfeld (R)	John; Erlenborn (R)	Charlotte; Thompson; Reid (R)	John B. Anderson (R)	Leslie; C. Arends (R)	Bob; Michel (R)	Tom; Railsback (R)	Paul; Findley (R)	Ken; Gray (D)	William; L. Springer (R)	George; E. Shipley (D)	Melvin; Price (D)	90th (1967–1969)
William L. Dawson (D)	Abner; Mikva (D)	William T. Murphy (D)	Ed; Derwinski (R)	John C. Kluczynski (D)	Daniel J. Ronan (D)	Frank; Annunzio (D)	Dan; Rosten- kowski (D)	Sidney R. Yates (D)	Harold R. Collier (R)	Roman; Pucinski (D)	Bob; McClory (R)	Phil; Crane (R)	John; Erlenborn (R)	Charlotte; Thompson; Reid (R)	John B. Anderson (R)	Leslie; C. Arends (R)	Bob; Michel (R)	Tom; Railsback (R)	Paul; Findley (R)	Ken; Gray (D)	William; L. Springer (R)	George; E. Shipley (D)	Melvin; Price (D)	91st (1969–1971)
Ralph; Metcalfe (D)	Abner; Mikva (D)	Morgan F. Murphy (D)	Ed; Derwinski (R)	John C. Kluczynski (D)	George W. Collins (D)	Frank; Annunzio (D)	Dan; Rosten- kowski (D)	Sidney R. Yates (D)	Harold R. Collier (R)	Roman; Pucinski (D)	Bob; McClory (R)	Phil; Crane (R)	John; Erlenborn (R)	Cliffard D. Carlson (R)	John B. Anderson (R)	Leslie; C. Arends (R)	Bob; Michel (R)	Tom; Railsback (R)	Paul; Findley (R)	Ken; Gray (D)	William; L. Springer (R)	George; E. Shipley (D)	Melvin; Price (D)	92nd (1971–1973)
Ralph; Metcalfe (D)	Morgan; F. Murphy (D)	Robert P. Hanrahan (R)	Ed; Derwinski (R)	John C. Kluczynski (D)	Harold R. Collier (R)	Cardiss; Collins (D)	Dan; Rosten- kowski (D)	Sidney R. Yates (D)	Samuel H. Young (R)	Frank; Annunzio (D)	Phil; Crane (R)	Bob; McClory (R)	John; Erlenborn (R)	Leslie C. Arends (R)	John B. Anderson (R)	George; M. O'Brien (R)	Bob; Michel (R)	Tom; Railsback (R)	Paul; Findley (R)	Ed; Madigan (R)	George; E. Shipley (D)	Melvin; Price (D)	Ken; Gray (D)	93rd (1973–1975
Ralph; Metcalfe (D)	Morgan; F. Murphy (D)	Marty; Russo (D)	Ed; Derwinski (R)	John C. Kluczynski (D)	Henry; Hyde (R)	Cardiss; Collins (D)	Dan; Rosten- kowski (D)	Sidney R. Yates (D)	Abner; Mikva (D)	Frank; Annunzio (D)	Phil; Crane (R)	Bob; McClory (R)	John; Erlenborn (R)	Tim Lee; Hall (D)	John B. Anderson (R)	George; M. O'Brien (R)	Bob; Michel (R)	Tom; Railsback (R)	Paul; Findley (R)	Ed; Madigan (R)	George; E. Shipley (D)	Melvin; Price (D)	Paul; Simon (D)	94th (1975–1977)
Ralph; Metcalfe (D)	Morgan; F. Murphy (D)	Marty; Russo (D)	Ed; Derwinski (R)	John G. Fary (D)	Henry; Hyde (R)	Cardiss; Collins (D)	Dan; Rosten- kowski (D)	Sidney R. Yates (D)	Abner; Mikva (D)	Frank; Annunzio (D)	Phil; Crane (R)	Bob; McClory (R)	John; Erlenborn (R)	Tom; Corcoran (R)	John B. Anderson (R)	George; M. O'Brien (R)	Bob; Michel (R)	Tom; Railsback (R)	Paul; Findley (R)	Ed; Madigan (R)	George; E. Shipley (D)	Melvin; Price (D)	Paul; Simon (D)	95th (1977–1979)
Bennett; Stewart (D)	Morgan; F. Murphy (D)	Marty; Russo (D)	Ed; Derwinski (R)	John G. Fary (D)	Henry; Hyde (R)	Cardiss; Collins (D)	Dan; Rosten- kowski (D)	Sidney R. Yates (D)	Abner; Mikva (D)	Frank; Annunzio (D)	Phil; Crane (R)	Bob; McClory (R)	John; Erlenborn (R)	Tom; Corcoran (R)	John B. Anderson (R)	George; M. O'Brien (R)	Bob; Michel (R)	Tom; Railsback (R)	Paul; Findley (R)	Ed; Madigan (R)	Dan; Crane (R)	Melvin; Price (D)	Paul; Simon (D)	96th (1979–1981)
Harold; Washington (D)	Gus; Savage (D)	Marty; Russo (D)	Ed; Derwinski (R)	John G. Fary (D)	Henry; Hyde (R)	Cardiss; Collins (D)	Dan; Rosten- kowski (D)	Sidney R. Yates (D)	John; Porter (R)	Frank; Annunzio (D)	Phil; Crane (R)	Bob; McClory (R)	John; Erlenborn (R)	Tom; Corcoran (R)	Lynn M. Martin (R)	George; M. O'Brien (R)	Bob; Michel (R)	Tom; Railsback (R)	Paul; Findley (R)	Ed; Madigan (R)	Dan; Crane (R)	Melvin; Price (D)	Paul; Simon (D)	97th (1981–1983)

=== 1983–1993: 22 seats ===
Following the 1980 census, Illinois was apportioned 22 seats.

Congress	District																					
Congress	1st	2nd	3rd	4th	5th	6th	7th	8th	9th	10th	11th	12th	13th	14th	15th	16th	17th	18th	19th	20th	21st	22nd
98th (1983–1985)	Harold; Washington (D)	Gus; Savage (D)	Marty; Russo (D)	George M. O'Brien (R)	Bill; Lipinski (D)	Henry; Hyde (R)	Cardiss; Collins (D)	Dan; Rostenkowski (D)	Sidney; Yates (D)	John; Porter (R)	Frank; Annunzio (D)	Phil; Crane (R)	John; Erlenborn (R)	Tom; Corcoran (R)	Ed; Madigan (R)	Lynn M. Martin (R)	Lane; Evans (D)	Bob; Michel (R)	Dan; Crane (R)	Dick; Durbin (D)	Melvin; Price (D)	Paul; Simon (D)
99th (1985–1987)	Charles; Hayes (D)	Gus; Savage (D)	Marty; Russo (D)	George M. O'Brien (R)	Bill; Lipinski (D)	Henry; Hyde (R)	Cardiss; Collins (D)	Dan; Rostenkowski (D)	Sidney; Yates (D)	John; Porter (R)	Frank; Annunzio (D)	Phil; Crane (R)	Harris; Fawell (R)	John; Grotberg (R)	Ed; Madigan (R)	Lynn M. Martin (R)	Lane; Evans (D)	Bob; Michel (R)	Terry L. Bruce (D)	Dick; Durbin (D)	Melvin; Price (D)	Ken; Gray (D)
100th (1987–1989)	Charles; Hayes (D)	Gus; Savage (D)	Marty; Russo (D)	Jack; Davis (R)	Bill; Lipinski (D)	Henry; Hyde (R)	Cardiss; Collins (D)	Dan; Rostenkowski (D)	Sidney; Yates (D)	John; Porter (R)	Frank; Annunzio (D)	Phil; Crane (R)	Harris; Fawell (R)	Dennis; Hastert (R)	Ed; Madigan (R)	Lynn M. Martin (R)	Lane; Evans (D)	Bob; Michel (R)	Terry L. Bruce (D)	Dick; Durbin (D)	Melvin; Price (D)	Ken; Gray (D)
101st (1989–1991)	Charles; Hayes (D)	Gus; Savage (D)	Marty; Russo (D)	George; Sangmeister (D)	Bill; Lipinski (D)	Henry; Hyde (R)	Cardiss; Collins (D)	Dan; Rostenkowski (D)	Sidney; Yates (D)	John; Porter (R)	Frank; Annunzio (D)	Phil; Crane (R)	Harris; Fawell (R)	Dennis; Hastert (R)	Ed; Madigan (R)	Lynn M. Martin (R)	Lane; Evans (D)	Bob; Michel (R)	Terry L. Bruce (D)	Dick; Durbin (D)	Jerry; Costello (D)	Glenn; Poshard (D)
102nd (1991–1993)	Charles; Hayes (D)	Gus; Savage (D)	Marty; Russo (D)	George; Sangmeister (D)	Bill; Lipinski (D)	Henry; Hyde (R)	Cardiss; Collins (D)	Dan; Rostenkowski (D)	Sidney; Yates (D)	John; Porter (R)	Frank; Annunzio (D)	Phil; Crane (R)	Harris; Fawell (R)	Dennis; Hastert (R)	Ed; Madigan (R)	John; Cox (D)	Lane; Evans (D)	Bob; Michel (R)	Terry L. Bruce (D)	Dick; Durbin (D)	Jerry; Costello (D)	Glenn; Poshard (D)

=== 1993–2003: 20 seats ===
Following the 1990 census, Illinois was apportioned 20 seats.

Congress	District																			
Congress	1st	2nd	3rd	4th	5th	6th	7th	8th	9th	10th	11th	12th	13th	14th	15th	16th	17th	18th	19th	20th
103rd (1993–1995)	Bobby; Rush (D)	Mel; Reynolds (D)	Bill; Lipinski (D)	Luis; Gutiérrez (D)	Dan; Rostenkowski (D)	Henry; Hyde (R)	Cardiss; Collins (D)	Phil; Crane (R)	Sidney; Yates (D)	John; Porter (R)	George; Sangmeister (D)	Jerry; Costello (D)	Harris; Fawell (R)	Dennis; Hastert (R)	Tom; Ewing (R)	Don; Manzullo (R)	Lane; Evans (D)	Bob; Michel (R)	Glenn; Poshard (D)	Dick; Durbin (D)
104th (1995–1997)	Bobby; Rush (D)	Mel; Reynolds (D)	Bill; Lipinski (D)	Luis; Gutiérrez (D)	Michael; Flanagan (R)	Henry; Hyde (R)	Cardiss; Collins (D)	Phil; Crane (R)	Sidney; Yates (D)	John; Porter (R)	Jerry; Weller (R)	Jerry; Costello (D)	Harris; Fawell (R)	Dennis; Hastert (R)	Tom; Ewing (R)	Don; Manzullo (R)	Lane; Evans (D)	Ray; LaHood (R)	Glenn; Poshard (D)	Dick; Durbin (D)
105th (1997–1999)	Bobby; Rush (D)	Jesse; Jackson; Jr. (D)	Bill; Lipinski (D)	Luis; Gutiérrez (D)	Rod; Blagojevich (D)	Henry; Hyde (R)	Danny; Davis (D)	Phil; Crane (R)	Sidney; Yates (D)	John; Porter (R)	Jerry; Weller (R)	Jerry; Costello (D)	Harris; Fawell (R)	Dennis; Hastert (R)	Tom; Ewing (R)	Don; Manzullo (R)	Lane; Evans (D)	Ray; LaHood (R)	Glenn; Poshard (D)	John; Shimkus (R)
106th (1999–2001)	Bobby; Rush (D)	Jesse; Jackson; Jr. (D)	Bill; Lipinski (D)	Luis; Gutiérrez (D)	Rod; Blagojevich (D)	Henry; Hyde (R)	Danny; Davis (D)	Phil; Crane (R)	Jan; Schakowsky (D)	John; Porter (R)	Jerry; Weller (R)	Jerry; Costello (D)	Judy; Biggert (R)	Dennis; Hastert (R)	Tom; Ewing (R)	Don; Manzullo (R)	Lane; Evans (D)	Ray; LaHood (R)	David; Phelps (D)	John; Shimkus (R)
107th (2001–2003)	Bobby; Rush (D)	Jesse; Jackson; Jr. (D)	Bill; Lipinski (D)	Luis; Gutiérrez (D)	Rod; Blagojevich (D)	Henry; Hyde (R)	Danny; Davis (D)	Phil; Crane (R)	Jan; Schakowsky (D)	Mark; Kirk (R)	Jerry; Weller (R)	Jerry; Costello (D)	Judy; Biggert (R)	Dennis; Hastert (R)	Tim; Johnson (R)	Don; Manzullo (R)	Lane; Evans (D)	Ray; LaHood (R)	David; Phelps (D)	John; Shimkus (R)

=== 2003–2013: 19 seats ===
Following the 2000 census, Illinois was apportioned 19 seats.

Congress	District																		
Congress	1st	2nd	3rd	4th	5th	6th	7th	8th	9th	10th	11th	12th	13th	14th	15th	16th	17th	18th	19th
108th (2003–2005)	Bobby; Rush (D)	Jesse; Jackson; Jr. (D)	Bill; Lipinski (D)	Luis; Gutiérrez (D)	Rahm; Emanuel (D)	Henry; Hyde (R)	Danny; Davis (D)	Phil; Crane (R)	Jan; Schakowsky (D)	Mark; Kirk (R)	Jerry; Weller (R)	Jerry; Costello (D)	Judy; Biggert (R)	Dennis; Hastert (R)	Tim; Johnson (R)	Don; Manzullo (R)	Lane; Evans (D)	Ray; LaHood (R)	John; Shimkus (R)
109th (2005–2007)	Bobby; Rush (D)	Jesse; Jackson; Jr. (D)	Dan; Lipinski (D)	Luis; Gutiérrez (D)	Rahm; Emanuel (D)	Henry; Hyde (R)	Danny; Davis (D)	Melissa; Bean (D)	Jan; Schakowsky (D)	Mark; Kirk (R)	Jerry; Weller (R)	Jerry; Costello (D)	Judy; Biggert (R)	Dennis; Hastert (R)	Tim; Johnson (R)	Don; Manzullo (R)	Lane; Evans (D)	Ray; LaHood (R)	John; Shimkus (R)
110th (2007–2009)	Bobby; Rush (D)	Jesse; Jackson; Jr. (D)	Dan; Lipinski (D)	Luis; Gutiérrez (D)	Rahm; Emanuel (D)	Peter; Roskam (R)	Danny; Davis (D)	Melissa; Bean (D)	Jan; Schakowsky (D)	Mark; Kirk (R)	Jerry; Weller (R)	Jerry; Costello (D)	Judy; Biggert (R)	Dennis; Hastert (R)	Tim; Johnson (R)	Don; Manzullo (R)	Phil; Hare (D)	Ray; LaHood (R)	John; Shimkus (R)
111th (2009–2011)	Bobby; Rush (D)	Jesse; Jackson; Jr. (D)	Dan; Lipinski (D)	Luis; Gutiérrez (D)	Mike; Quigley (D)	Peter; Roskam (R)	Danny; Davis (D)	Melissa; Bean (D)	Jan; Schakowsky (D)	Mark; Kirk (R)	Debbie; Halvorson (D)	Jerry; Costello (D)	Judy; Biggert (R)	Bill; Foster (D)	Tim; Johnson (R)	Don; Manzullo (R)	Phil; Hare (D)	Aaron; Schock (R)	John; Shimkus (R)
112th (2011–2013)	Bobby; Rush (D)	Jesse; Jackson; Jr. (D)	Dan; Lipinski (D)	Luis; Gutiérrez (D)	Mike; Quigley (D)	Peter; Roskam (R)	Danny; Davis (D)	Joe; Walsh (R)	Jan; Schakowsky (D)	Bob; Dold (R)	Adam; Kinzinger (R)	Jerry; Costello (D)	Judy; Biggert (R)	Randy; Hultgren (R)	Tim; Johnson (R)	Don; Manzullo (R)	Bobby; Schilling (R)	Aaron; Schock (R)	John; Shimkus (R)

=== 2013–2023: 18 seats ===
Following the 2010 census, Illinois was apportioned 18 seats.

Congress	District																	
Congress	1st	2nd	3rd	4th	5th	6th	7th	8th	9th	10th	11th	12th	13th	14th	15th	16th	17th	18th
113th (2013–2015)	Bobby; Rush (D)	Robin; Kelly (D)	Dan; Lipinski (D)	Luis; Gutiérrez (D)	Mike; Quigley (D)	Peter; Roskam (R)	Danny; Davis (D)	Tammy; Duckworth (D)	Jan; Schakowsky (D)	Brad; Schneider (D)	Bill; Foster (D)	William; Enyart (D)	Rodney; Davis (R)	Randy; Hultgren (R)	John; Shimkus (R)	Adam; Kinzinger (R)	Cheri; Bustos (D)	Aaron; Schock (R)
114th (2015–2017)	Bobby; Rush (D)	Robin; Kelly (D)	Dan; Lipinski (D)	Luis; Gutiérrez (D)	Mike; Quigley (D)	Peter; Roskam (R)	Danny; Davis (D)	Tammy; Duckworth (D)	Jan; Schakowsky (D)	Bob; Dold (R)	Bill; Foster (D)	Mike; Bost (R)	Rodney; Davis (R)	Randy; Hultgren (R)	John; Shimkus (R)	Adam; Kinzinger (R)	Cheri; Bustos (D)	Aaron; Schock (R)
114th (2015–2017)	Bobby; Rush (D)	Robin; Kelly (D)	Dan; Lipinski (D)	Luis; Gutiérrez (D)	Mike; Quigley (D)	Peter; Roskam (R)	Danny; Davis (D)	Tammy; Duckworth (D)	Jan; Schakowsky (D)	Bob; Dold (R)	Bill; Foster (D)	Mike; Bost (R)	Rodney; Davis (R)	Randy; Hultgren (R)	John; Shimkus (R)	Adam; Kinzinger (R)	Cheri; Bustos (D)	Darin; LaHood (R)
115th (2017–2019)	Bobby; Rush (D)	Robin; Kelly (D)	Dan; Lipinski (D)	Luis; Gutiérrez (D)	Mike; Quigley (D)	Peter; Roskam (R)	Danny; Davis (D)	Raja; Krishnamoorthi (D)	Jan; Schakowsky (D)	Brad; Schneider (D)	Bill; Foster (D)	Mike; Bost (R)	Rodney; Davis (R)	Randy; Hultgren (R)	John; Shimkus (R)	Adam; Kinzinger (R)	Cheri; Bustos (D)	Darin; LaHood (R)
116th (2019–2021)	Bobby; Rush (D)	Robin; Kelly (D)	Dan; Lipinski (D)	Chuy; García (D)	Mike; Quigley (D)	Sean; Casten (D)	Danny; Davis (D)	Raja; Krishnamoorthi (D)	Jan; Schakowsky (D)	Brad; Schneider (D)	Bill; Foster (D)	Mike; Bost (R)	Rodney; Davis (R)	Lauren; Underwood (D)	John; Shimkus (R)	Adam; Kinzinger (R)	Cheri; Bustos (D)	Darin; LaHood (R)
117th (2021–2023)	Bobby; Rush (D)	Robin; Kelly (D)	Marie; Newman (D)	Chuy; García (D)	Mike; Quigley (D)	Sean; Casten (D)	Danny; Davis (D)	Raja; Krishnamoorthi (D)	Jan; Schakowsky (D)	Brad; Schneider (D)	Bill; Foster (D)	Mike; Bost (R)	Rodney; Davis (R)	Lauren; Underwood (D)	Mary; Miller (R)	Adam; Kinzinger (R)	Cheri; Bustos (D)	Darin; LaHood (R)

=== 2023–present: 17 seats ===
Following the 2020 census, Illinois was apportioned 17 seats.

Congress	District																
Congress	1st	2nd	3rd	4th	5th	6th	7th	8th	9th	10th	11th	12th	13th	14th	15th	16th	17th
118th (2023–2025)	Jonathan; Jackson (D)	Robin; Kelly (D)	Delia; Ramirez (D)	Chuy; García (D)	Mike; Quigley (D)	Sean; Casten (D)	Danny; Davis (D)	Raja; Krishnamoorthi (D)	Jan; Schakowsky (D)	Brad; Schneider (D)	Bill; Foster (D)	Mike; Bost (R)	Nikki; Budzinski (D)	Lauren; Underwood (D)	Mary; Miller (R)	Darin; LaHood (R)	Eric; Sorensen (D)
119th (2025–2027)	Jonathan; Jackson (D)	Robin; Kelly (D)	Delia; Ramirez (D)	Chuy; García (D)	Mike; Quigley (D)	Sean; Casten (D)	Danny; Davis (D)	Raja; Krishnamoorthi (D)	Jan; Schakowsky (D)	Brad; Schneider (D)	Bill; Foster (D)	Mike; Bost (R)	Nikki; Budzinski (D)	Lauren; Underwood (D)	Mary; Miller (R)	Darin; LaHood (R)	Eric; Sorensen (D)
120th (2027–2029)	Jonathan; Jackson (D)	Donna; Miller (D)	Delia; Ramirez (D)	Patty; Garía (D)	Mike; Quigley (D)	Sean; Casten (D)	La Shawn; Ford (D)	Melissa; Bean (D)	Daniel; Biss (D)	Brad; Schneider (D)	Bill; Foster (D)	Mike; Bost (R)	Nikki; Budzinski (D)	Lauren; Underwood (D)	Mary; Miller (R)	Darin; LaHood (R)	Eric; Sorensen (D)

== Key ==
Democratic (D)
Democratic-Republican (DR)
Greenback (GB)
Independent Democrat (ID)
Jacksonian (J)
Liberal Republican (LR)
National Republican (NR)
Opposition Northern (O)
Progressive (Bull Moose) (Prog)
Republican (R)
Whig (W)
Independent (I)

== See also ==
- List of United States congressional districts
- Illinois's congressional districts
- Political party strength in Illinois
