= John R. Eden =

American lawyer and politician from Illinois (1826–1909)

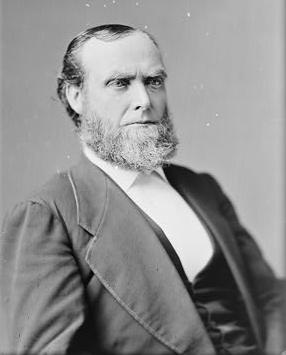

Member of the United States House of Representatives from Illinois
- In office March 4, 1863 – March 3, 1865
- Preceded by: James Carroll Robinson
- Succeeded by: Henry P. H. Bromwell
- Constituency: 7th district
- In office March 4, 1873 – March 3, 1879
- Preceded by: District created
- Succeeded by: Albert P. Forsythe
- Constituency: 15th district
- In office March 4, 1885 – March 3, 1887
- Preceded by: Samuel W. Moulton
- Succeeded by: Edward Lane
- Constituency: 17th district

Personal details
- Born: February 1, 1826 Bath County, Kentucky, U.S.
- Died: June 9, 1909 (aged 83) Sullivan, Illinois, U.S.
- Resting place: Greenhill Cemetery
- Party: Democratic

John Rice Eden (February 1, 1826 – June 9, 1909) was an American lawyer and politician who a total of five terms served as a U.S. Representative from Illinois during three non-consecutive stints between 1863 and 1887.

== Early life and career ==
Born in Bath County, Kentucky, Eden moved with his parents to Indiana. He attended public schools, and later studied law. He was admitted to the bar in 1853 at Shelbyville, Illinois and commenced practice in Sullivan, Illinois.

He served as prosecuting attorney for the seventeenth judicial district of Illinois 1856–1860.

== Congress ==
Eden was elected as a Democrat to the Thirty-eighth Congress (March 4, 1863 – March 3, 1865). He was an unsuccessful candidate for reelection in 1864 to the Thirty-ninth Congress. He was an unsuccessful Democratic nominee for Governor of Illinois in 1868.

Eden was elected to the Forty-third, Forty-fourth, and Forty-fifth Congresses (March 4, 1873 – March 3, 1879). He served as chairman of the Committee on War Claims (Forty-fourth and Forty-fifth Congresses). He was an unsuccessful candidate for renomination in 1878. He resumed the practice of law in Sullivan, Illinois.

Eden was elected to the Forty-ninth Congress (March 4, 1885 – March 3, 1887). He was an unsuccessful candidate for renomination in 1886.

== Later career and death ==
He again engaged in the practice of law.

He died in Sullivan, Illinois, June 9, 1909. He was interred in Greenhill Cemetery.

Party political offices
Preceded by James Carroll Robinson	Democratic nominee for Governor of Illinois; 1868	Vacant Title next held by Lewis Steward
U.S. House of Representatives
Preceded by James C. Robinson	Member of the U.S. House of Representatives from Illinois's 7th congressional district 1863-1865	Succeeded by Henry P. H. Bromwell
Preceded by District created	Member of the U.S. House of Representatives from Illinois's 15th congressional district 1873-1879	Succeeded by Albert P. Forsythe
Preceded by Samuel W. Moulton	Member of the U.S. House of Representatives from Illinois's 17th congressional district 1885-1887	Succeeded by Edward Lane
