= William A. J. Sparks =

American politician

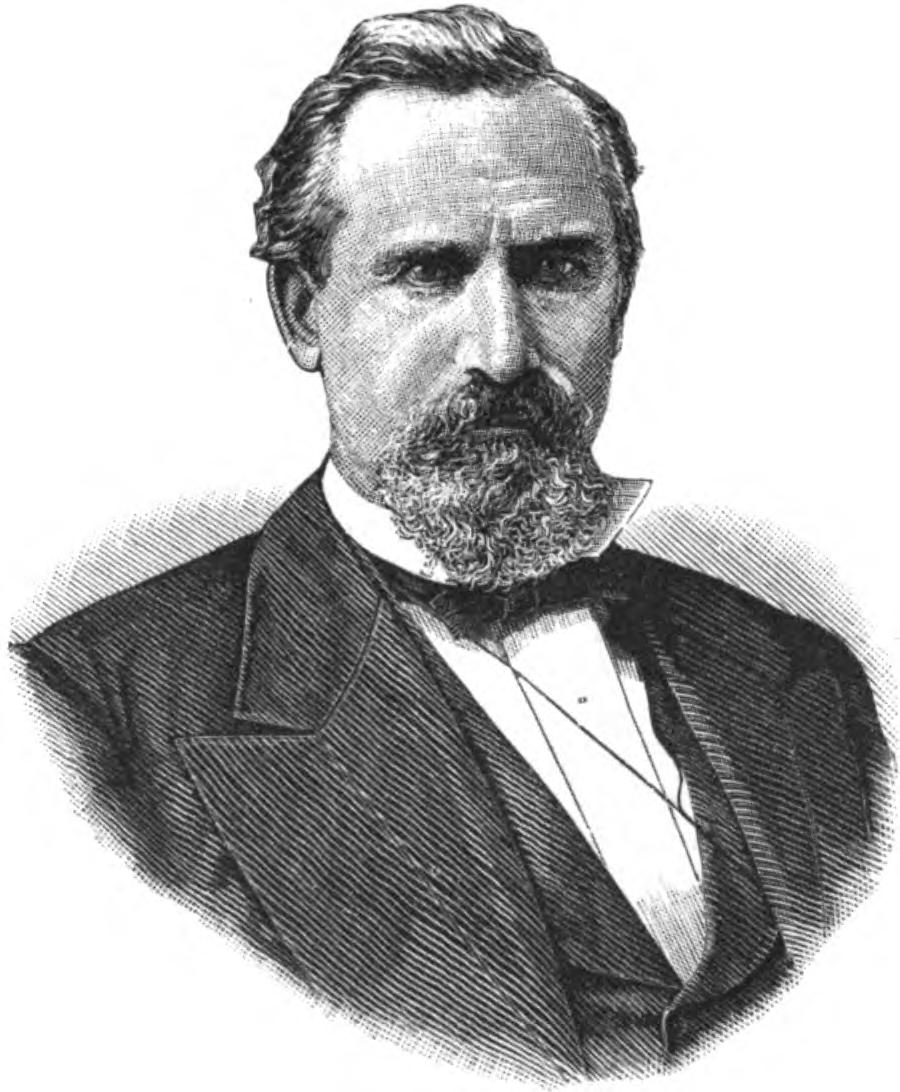

Member of the U.S. House of Representatives from Illinois's 16th district
- In office March 4, 1875 – March 3, 1883
- Preceded by: James S. Martin
- Succeeded by: Aaron Shaw

Member of the Illinois House of Representatives
- In office 1856-1857

Member of the Illinois Senate
- In office 1863-1864

Personal details
- Born: November 19, 1828 New Albany, Indiana, U.S.
- Died: May 7, 1904 (aged 75) St. Louis, Missouri, U.S.
- Resting place: St. Mary's Catholic Cemetery, Carlyle, Illinois
- Party: Democratic
- Education: McKendree College
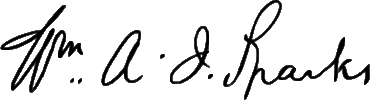
- Signature

William Andrew Jackson Sparks (November 19, 1828 – May 7, 1904) was a U.S. representative from Illinois.

== Biography ==
Born near New Albany, Indiana, Sparks moved with his parents to Illinois in 1836. He attended the public schools and graduated from McKendree College in 1850. He taught school for a time and studied law. He was admitted to the bar in 1851 and commenced practice in Carlyle, Illinois. United States land receiver for the Edwardsville (Illinois) land office 1853–1856. He served as member of the State house of representatives in 1856 and 1857. He served in the State senate in 1863 and 1864. He served as delegate to the Democratic National Convention in 1868.

Sparks was elected as a Democrat to the Forty-fourth and to the three succeeding Congresses (March 4, 1875 – March 3, 1883). He served as chairman of the Committee on Expenditures in the Department of the Interior (Forty-fifth Congress), Committee on Military Affairs (Forty-sixth Congress). He did not seek renomination in 1882 and resumed the practice of law. He was appointed by President Cleveland as Commissioner of the United States General Land Office and served from March 26, 1885, to March 26, 1888. He resumed the practice of law at Carlyle and Springfield, Illinois. He died in St. Louis, Missouri, May 7, 1904. He was interred in St. Mary's Catholic Cemetery, Carlyle, Illinois.

U.S. House of Representatives
Preceded by James S. Martin	Member of the U.S. House of Representatives from Illinois's 16th congressional district 1875–1883	Succeeded by Aaron Shaw
Political offices
Preceded by Noah C. McFarland	Commissioner of the General Land Office; March 26, 1885 – March 27, 1888	Succeeded by Strother M. Stockslager
