= James Carroll Robinson =

American politician (1823–1886)

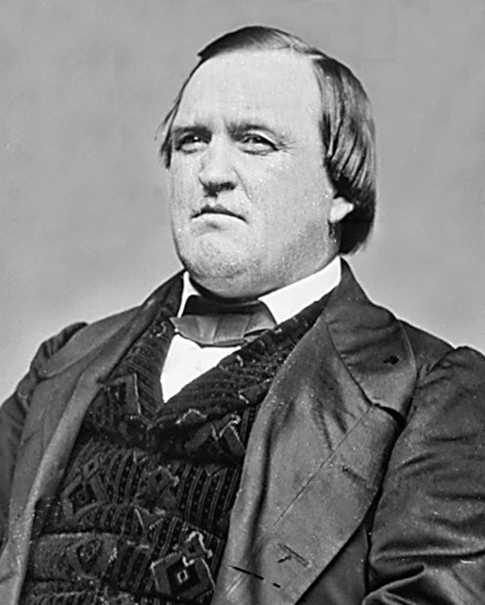

Member of the U.S. House of Representatives from Illinois
- In office March 4, 1859 – March 3, 1865
- Preceded by: Aaron Shaw
- Succeeded by: Samuel S. Marshall
- Constituency: 7th district (1859–63); 11th district (1863–65)
- In office March 4, 1871 – March 3, 1875
- Preceded by: Shelby Moore Cullom
- Succeeded by: William McKendree Springer
- Constituency: 8th district (1871–73); 12th district (1873–75)

Personal details
- Born: August 19, 1823 Paris, Illinois, U.S.
- Died: November 3, 1886 (aged 63) Springfield, Illinois, U.S.
- Party: Democratic

James Carroll Robinson (August 19, 1823 – November 3, 1886) was a U.S. Representative from Illinois.

Born near Paris, Illinois, Robinson moved to Clark County, Illinois, with his parents in 1825. He received a limited schooling. He engaged in agricultural pursuits. He served as a corporal during the Mexican War. He studied law. He was admitted to the bar in 1850 and commenced practice in Marshall, Illinois.

Robinson was elected as a Democrat to the Thirty-sixth, Thirty-seventh, and Thirty-eighth Congresses (March 4, 1859 – March 3, 1865). His vote on the Thirteenth Amendment is recorded as nay. He did not seek renomination in 1864, but was an unsuccessful candidate for Governor of Illinois. He resumed the practice of law in Marshall. He moved to Sangamon County, Illinois, in 1869 and continued the practice of law in Springfield.

Robinson was elected to the Forty-second and Forty-third Congresses (March 4, 1871 – March 3, 1875). He served as chairman of the Committee on Mileage (Thirty-seventh and Thirty-eighth Congresses). He declined to be a candidate for renomination in 1874 to the Forty-fourth Congress. He resumed the practice of law. He was appointed a member of the Illinois Board of Livestock Commissioners in 1886. He died in Springfield, Illinois, on November 3, 1886, and was interred in Oak Ridge Cemetery.

Party political offices
Preceded by James C. Allen	Democratic nominee for Governor of Illinois; 1864	Succeeded by John R. Eden
U.S. House of Representatives
Preceded by Aaron Shaw	Member of the U.S. House of Representatives from Illinois's 7th congressional district 1859-1863	Succeeded by John R. Eden
Preceded by District created	Member of the U.S. House of Representatives from Illinois's 11th congressional district 1863-1865	Succeeded by Samuel S. Marshall
Preceded by Shelby M. Cullom	Member of the U.S. House of Representatives from Illinois's 8th congressional district 1871-1873	Succeeded by Greenbury L. Fort
Preceded by John B. Hay	Member of the U.S. House of Representatives from Illinois's 12th congressional district 1873-1875	Succeeded by William M. Springer
