= Albert P. Forsythe =

American politician

Member of the U.S. House of Representatives from Illinois's 15th district
- In office March 4, 1879 – March 3, 1881
- Preceded by: John R. Eden
- Succeeded by: Samuel W. Moulton

Personal details
- Born: May 24, 1830 New Richmond, Ohio, U.S.
- Died: September 2, 1906 (aged 76) Independence, Kansas, U.S.
- Party: Greenback

Albert Palaska Forsythe (May 24, 1830 – September 2, 1906) was a U.S. representative from Illinois.

== Biography ==
Born in New Richmond, Ohio, Forsythe attended the common schools and Indiana Asbury College (now DePauw University), Greencastle, Indiana. He was admitted into the Indiana conference of the Methodist Church as a traveling preacher in 1853 and served eight years. During the Civil War, Forsythe served in the Union Army as first lieutenant of Company I, Ninety-seventh Regiment, Indiana Volunteer Infantry. He moved to Illinois in 1865 and settled on a farm west of Paris, Edgar County. He took an active part in the Grange movement and served six years as master of the State Grange of Illinois.

Forsythe was elected as a Greenback to the Forty-sixth Congress (March 4, 1879 – March 3, 1881). He was an unsuccessful candidate for reelection in 1880 to the Forty-seventh Congress. He moved to Kansas in 1882 and engaged in agricultural pursuits near Liberty, Montgomery County. He served as Regent of the Kansas State Agricultural College (now Kansas State University) 1886-1892. He moved to Independence, Kansas, where he died September 2, 1906. He was interred in Liberty Cemetery, Liberty, Kansas.

U.S. House of Representatives
Preceded by John R. Eden	Member of the U.S. House of Representatives from Illinois's 15th congressional district 1879-1881	Succeeded by Samuel W. Moulton
