= Edward Lane (Illinois politician) =

American politician

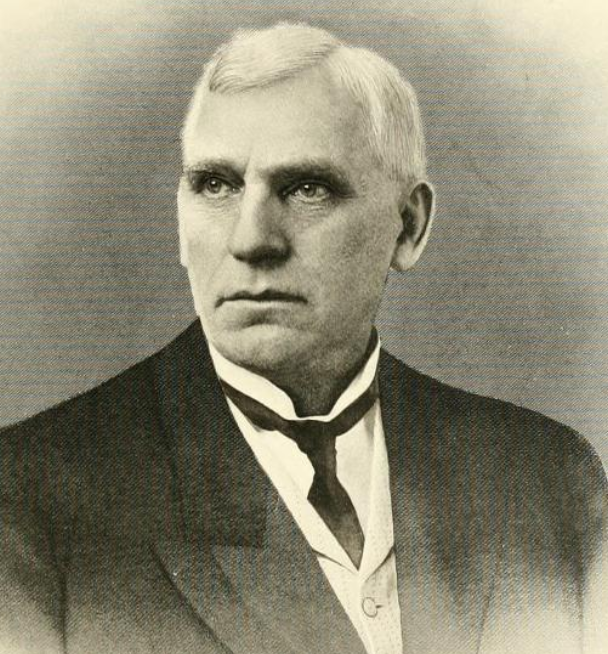
- From 1904's Past and Present of Montgomery County, Illinois

Member of the U.S. House of Representatives from Illinois's 17th district
- In office March 4, 1887 – March 3, 1895
- Preceded by: John R. Eden
- Succeeded by: James A. Connolly

Personal details
- Born: March 27, 1842 Cleveland, Ohio, U.S.
- Died: October 30, 1912 (aged 70) Hillsboro, Illinois, U.S.
- Resting place: Oak Grave Cemetery
- Party: Democratic

Edward Lane (March 27, 1842 – October 30, 1912) was an American teacher, lawyer, judge, and Democratic politician who served four terms in the United States House of Representatives from Illinois from 1887 to 1895.

== Biography ==
Born in Cleveland, Ohio, on March 27, 1842, he moved to Illinois in May 1858 with his parents, who settled in Hillsboro, Montgomery County. Lane attended local schools and graduated from Hillsboro Academy before becoming a schoolteacher for several years.

=== Early career ===
Lane then studied law and was admitted to the Illinois bar in February 1865, after which he began his legal practice in Hillsboro and served as the city attorney for three years. Local voters elected him judge of the Montgomery County Court in November 1869, a position he held until 1873.

=== Congress ===
Lane was elected as a Democrat to the Fiftieth and to the three succeeding Congresses (March 4, 1887 – March 3, 1895). He served as chairman of the Committee on Militia (Fifty-second Congress). He lost his campaign for reelection in 1894 to the Fifty-fourth Congress to Republican James A. Connolly.

=== Later career ===
Lane resumed his legal practice in Hillsboro.

=== Death and burial ===
Lane died at his home in Hillsboro on October 30, 1912, and was interred in Oak Grove Cemetery.

U.S. House of Representatives
Preceded by John R. Eden	Member of the U.S. House of Representatives from Illinois's 17th congressional district 1887-1895	Succeeded by James A. Connolly
