= Illinois's 7th congressional district =

U.S. House district for Illinois

- Interactive map of district boundaries since January 3, 2023
- Representative: Danny Davis; D–Chicago
- Area: 69.3 mi^{2} (179 km^{2})
- Distribution: 100.0% urban; 0.0% rural
- Population (2025): 763,117
- Median household income: $90,557
- Ethnicity: 42.8% Black; 29.5% White; 15.7% Hispanic; 8.6% Asian; 2.5% Two or more races; 0.5% other
- Cook PVI: D+34

The 7th congressional district of Illinois covers parts of Cook County, as of the 2023 redistricting that followed the 2020 census. All or parts of Broadview, Bellwood, Chicago, Forest Park, Hillside, Oak Park, La Grange Park, Maywood, River Forest, Berkeley, and Westchester are included. Democrat Danny K. Davis has represented the district since January 1997. With a Cook Partisan Voting Index rating of D+36, it is the most Democratic district in Illinois.

Due to reapportionment every ten years, the 7th district like other districts has relocated in Illinois throughout its history. In the mid-1800s, Abraham Lincoln represented the 7th district before being elected president, although his home now lies within Illinois's 13th congressional district and most of his district's former territory is now located in the 15th district.

In 1846, the 7th district was the only one in Illinois (among seven at the time) with a comfortably safe majority for the Whig Party.

== Recent election results from statewide races ==
Year	Office	Results
2008	President	Obama 89% - 10%
2012	President	Obama 88% - 12%
2016	President	Clinton 86% - 10%
2016	Senate	Duckworth 81% - 15%
2016	Comptroller (Spec.)	Mendoza 76% - 18%
2018	Governor	Pritzker 83% - 14%
2018	Attorney General	Raoul 83% - 15%
2018	Secretary of State	White 89% - 9%
2018	Comptroller	Mendoza 85% - 12%
2018	Treasurer	Frerichs 84% - 13%
2020	President	Biden 86% - 13%
2020	Senate	Durbin 75% - 12%
2022	Senate	Duckworth 86% - 13%
2022	Governor	Pritzker 85% - 13%
2022	Attorney General	Raoul 84% - 14%
2022	Secretary of State	Giannoulias 84% - 13%
2022	Comptroller	Mendoza 85% - 13%
2022	Treasurer	Frerichs 84% - 14%
2024	President	Harris 81% - 17%

== Composition ==
For the 118th and successive Congresses (based on redistricting following the 2020 census), the district contains all or portions of the following counties, townships, and municipalities:

Cook County (19)

Bellwood, Berkeley (part, also 4th), Broadview, Chicago (part, also 1st, 2nd, 3rd, 4th, 5th, 6th, 8th, and 9th; shared with DuPage County), Elmhurst (part, also 4th), Elmwood Park, Forest Park, Hillside, La Grange Park (part, also 4th), Leyden Township (part, also 3rd and 4th), Maywood (part, also 4th), North Riverside (part, also 4th), Oak Park, Oak Park Township, Proviso Township (part, also 4th), River Forest, River Forest Township, Riverside Township (part, also 4th), Westchester

Chicago neighborhoods in the 7th district include:

- Armour Square
- Austin (part)
- Chicago Lawn (part)
- Douglas (part)
- East Garfield Park
- Englewood (part)
- Fuller Park
- Grand Boulevard (part)
- Humboldt Park (part)
- The Loop
- Near North Side (part)
- Near South Side (part)
- Near West Side
- North Lawndale
- West Englewood
- West Garfield Park
- West Town (part)

== List of members representing the district ==
Member	Party	Years	Cong ress	Electoral history	District location
District created March 4, 1843
John J. Hardin (Jacksonville)	Whig	March 4, 1843 – March 3, 1845	28th	Elected in 1842. [data missing]	
Edward D. Baker (Springfield)	Whig	March 4, 1845 – January 15, 1847	29th	Elected in 1844. Resigned early to join the Illinois Volunteer Infantry.	
Vacant		January 15, 1847 – February 5, 1847	29th		
John Henry (Springfield)	Whig	February 5, 1847 – March 3, 1847	29th	Elected to finish Baker's term. Was not a candidate for the next term.	
Abraham Lincoln (Springfield)	Whig	March 4, 1847 – March 3, 1849	30th	Elected in 1846. Retired, having pledged to serve only one term.	
Thomas L. Harris (Petersburg)	Democratic	March 4, 1849 – March 3, 1851	31st	Elected in 1848. [data missing]	
Richard Yates (Jacksonville)	Whig	March 4, 1851 – March 3, 1853	32nd	Elected in 1850. Redistricted to the 6th district.	
James C. Allen (Palestine)	Democratic	March 4, 1853 – July 18, 1856	33rd 34th	Elected in 1852. Re-elected in 1854. Disqualified.	
Vacant		July 18, 1856 – November 4, 1856	34th		
James C. Allen (Palestine)	Democratic	November 4, 1856 – March 3, 1857	34th	Re-elected to finish his own term. [data missing]	
Aaron Shaw (Lawrenceville)	Democratic	March 4, 1857 – March 3, 1859	35th	Elected in 1856. [data missing]	
James C. Robinson (Marshall)	Democratic	March 4, 1859 – March 3, 1863	36th 37th	Elected in 1858; Re-elected in 1860. Redistricted to the 11th district.	
John R. Eden (Sullivan)	Democratic	March 4, 1863 – March 3, 1865	38th	Elected in 1862. [data missing]	
Henry P. H. Bromwell (Charleston)	Republican	March 4, 1865 – March 3, 1869	39th 40th	Elected in 1864. Re-elected in 1866. [data missing]	
Jesse H. Moore (Decatur)	Republican	March 4, 1869 – March 3, 1873	41st 42nd	Elected in 1868. Re-elected in 1870. [data missing]	
Franklin Corwin (Peru)	Republican	March 4, 1873 – March 3, 1875	43rd	Elected in 1872. [data missing]	
Alexander Campbell (La Salle)	Independent	March 4, 1875 – March 3, 1877	44th	Elected in 1874. [data missing]	
Philip C. Hayes (Morris)	Republican	March 4, 1877 – March 3, 1881	45th 46th	Elected in 1876. Re-elected in 1878. [data missing]	
William Cullen (Ottawa)	Republican	March 4, 1881 – March 3, 1883	47th	Elected in 1880. Redistricted to the 8th district.	
Thomas J. Henderson (Princeton)	Republican	March 4, 1883 – March 3, 1895	48th 49th 50th 51st 52nd 53rd	Redistricted from the 6th district and re-elected in 1882. Re-elected in 1884. Re-elected in 1886. Re-elected in 1888. Re-elected in 1890. Re-elected in 1892. [data missing]	
George E. Foss (Chicago)	Republican	March 4, 1895 – March 3, 1903	54th 55th 56th 57th	Elected in 1894. Re-elected in 1896. Re-elected in 1898. Re-elected in 1900. Redistricted to the 10th district.	
Philip Knopf (Chicago)	Republican	March 4, 1903 – March 3, 1909	58th 59th 60th	Elected in 1902. Re-elected in 1904. Re-elected in 1906. [data missing]	
Frederick Lundin (Chicago)	Republican	March 4, 1909 – March 3, 1911	61st	Elected in 1908. [data missing]	
Frank Buchanan (Chicago)	Democratic	March 4, 1911 – March 3, 1917	62nd 63rd 64th	Elected in 1910. Re-elected in 1912. Re-elected in 1914. Lost re-election.	
Niels Juul (Chicago)	Republican	March 4, 1917 – March 3, 1921	65th 66th	Elected in 1916. Re-elected in 1918. Lost renomination.	
M. Alfred Michaelson (Chicago)	Republican	March 4, 1921 – March 3, 1931	67th 68th 69th 70th 71st	Elected in 1920. Re-elected in 1922. Re-elected in 1924. Re-elected in 1926. Re-elected in 1928. Lost renomination.	
Leonard W. Schuetz (Chicago)	Democratic	March 4, 1931 – February 13, 1944	72nd 73rd 74th 75th 76th 77th 78th	Elected in 1930. Re-elected in 1932. Re-elected in 1934. Re-elected in 1936. Re-elected in 1938. Re-elected in 1940. Re-elected in 1942. Died.	
Vacant		February 13, 1944 – January 3, 1945	78th		
William W. Link (Chicago)	Democratic	January 3, 1945 – January 3, 1947	79th	Elected in 1944. Lost re-election.	
Thomas L. Owens (Chicago)	Republican	January 3, 1947 – June 7, 1948	80th	Elected in 1946. Died.	
Vacant		June 7, 1948 – January 3, 1949	80th		
Adolph J. Sabath (Chicago)	Democratic	January 3, 1949 – November 6, 1952	81st 82nd	Redistricted from the 5th district and re-elected in 1948. Re-elected in 1950. Re-elected in 1952. Died.	
Vacant		November 6, 1952 – July 7, 1953	82nd 83rd		
James Bowler (Chicago)	Democratic	July 7, 1953 – July 18, 1957	83rd 84th 85th	Elected to finish Sabath's term. Re-elected in 1954. Re-elected in 1956. Died.	
Vacant		July 18, 1957 – December 31, 1957	85th		
Roland V. Libonati (Chicago)	Democratic	December 31, 1957 – January 3, 1965	85th 86th 87th 88th	Elected to finish Bowler's term. Re-elected in 1958. Re-elected in 1960. Re-elected in 1962. [data missing]	
Frank Annunzio (Chicago)	Democratic	January 3, 1965 – January 3, 1973	89th 90th 91st 92nd	Elected in 1964. Re-elected in 1966. Re-elected in 1968. Re-elected in 1970. Redistricted to the 11th district.	
Vacant		January 3, 1973 – June 5, 1973	93rd	George W. Collins redistricted from the 6th district and re-elected in 1972, but died on December 8, 1972.	
Cardiss Collins (Chicago)	Democratic	June 5, 1973 – January 3, 1997	93rd 94th 95th 96th 97th 98th 99th 100th 101st 102nd 103rd 104th	Elected to finish her husband's term. Re-elected in 1974. Re-elected in 1976. Re-elected in 1978. Re-elected in 1980. Re-elected in 1982. Re-elected in 1984. Re-elected in 1986. Re-elected in 1988. Re-elected in 1990. Re-elected in 1992. Re-elected in 1994. Retired.	
Danny K. Davis (Chicago)	Democratic	January 3, 1997 – present	105th 106th 107th 108th 109th 110th 111th 112th 113th 114th 115th 116th 117th 118th 119th	Elected in 1996. Re-elected in 1998. Re-elected in 2000. Re-elected in 2002. Re-elected in 2004. Re-elected in 2006. Re-elected in 2008. Re-elected in 2010. Re-elected in 2012. Re-elected in 2014. Re-elected in 2016. Re-elected in 2018. Re-elected in 2020. Re-elected in 2022. Re-elected in 2024. Retiring at the end of term.	
Danny K. Davis (Chicago)	Democratic	January 3, 1997 – present	105th 106th 107th 108th 109th 110th 111th 112th 113th 114th 115th 116th 117th 118th 119th	Elected in 1996. Re-elected in 1998. Re-elected in 2000. Re-elected in 2002. Re-elected in 2004. Re-elected in 2006. Re-elected in 2008. Re-elected in 2010. Re-elected in 2012. Re-elected in 2014. Re-elected in 2016. Re-elected in 2018. Re-elected in 2020. Re-elected in 2022. Re-elected in 2024. Retiring at the end of term.	2003–2013
Danny K. Davis (Chicago)	Democratic	January 3, 1997 – present	105th 106th 107th 108th 109th 110th 111th 112th 113th 114th 115th 116th 117th 118th 119th	Elected in 1996. Re-elected in 1998. Re-elected in 2000. Re-elected in 2002. Re-elected in 2004. Re-elected in 2006. Re-elected in 2008. Re-elected in 2010. Re-elected in 2012. Re-elected in 2014. Re-elected in 2016. Re-elected in 2018. Re-elected in 2020. Re-elected in 2022. Re-elected in 2024. Retiring at the end of term.	2013–2023
Danny K. Davis (Chicago)	Democratic	January 3, 1997 – present	105th 106th 107th 108th 109th 110th 111th 112th 113th 114th 115th 116th 117th 118th 119th	Elected in 1996. Re-elected in 1998. Re-elected in 2000. Re-elected in 2002. Re-elected in 2004. Re-elected in 2006. Re-elected in 2008. Re-elected in 2010. Re-elected in 2012. Re-elected in 2014. Re-elected in 2016. Re-elected in 2018. Re-elected in 2020. Re-elected in 2022. Re-elected in 2024. Retiring at the end of term.	2023–present
La Shawn Ford (Chicago)	Democratic	Assuming office on January 3, 2027		Elected in 2026.	2023–present

== Election results ==
=== 2012 ===
Illinois's 7th congressional district, 2012
Party	Candidate	Votes	%
Democratic	Danny K. Davis (incumbent)	242,439	84.6
Republican	Rita Zak	31,466	11.0
Independent	John Monaghan	12,523	4.4
Independent	Phil Collins (write-in)	5	0.0
Independent	Dennis Richter (write-in)	2	0.0
Total votes		286,435	100.0
Democratic hold			

=== 2014 ===
Illinois's 7th congressional district, 2014
Party	Candidate	Votes	%
Democratic	Danny K. Davis (incumbent)	155,110	85.1
Republican	Robert Bumpers	27,168	14.9
Total votes		182,278	100.0
Democratic hold			

=== 2016 ===
Illinois's 7th congressional district, 2016
Party	Candidate	Votes	%
Democratic	Danny K. Davis (incumbent)	250,584	84.2
Republican	Jeffrey Leef	46,882	15.8
Total votes		297,466	100.0
Democratic hold			

=== 2018 ===
Illinois's 7th congressional district, 2018
Party	Candidate	Votes	%
Democratic	Danny K. Davis (incumbent)	215,746	87.6
Republican	Craig Cameron	30,497	12.4
Total votes		246,243	100.0
Democratic hold			

=== 2020 ===
Illinois's 7th congressional district, 2020
Party	Candidate	Votes	%	±%
Democratic	Danny K. Davis (incumbent)	249,383	80.41	−7.21%
Republican	Craig Cameron	41,390	13.35	+0.97%
Independent	Tracy Jennings	19,355	6.24	N/A
Total votes		310,128	100.0	
Democratic hold				

=== 2022 ===
Illinois's 7th congressional district, 2022
Party	Candidate	Votes	%
Democratic	Danny K. Davis (incumbent)	167,650	99.94
Write-in		96	0.06
Total votes		167,746	100.0
Democratic hold			

=== 2024 ===
Illinois's 7th congressional district, 2024
Party	Candidate	Votes	%
Democratic	Danny K. Davis (incumbent)	222,408	83.25
Republican	Chad Koppie	44,598	16.69
Write-in		146	0.06
Total votes		267,152	100.0
Democratic hold			

== See also ==
- Illinois's congressional districts
- List of United States congressional districts
