= William B. Anderson =

American politician

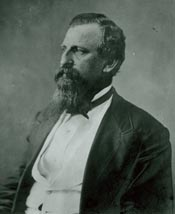

Member of the U.S. House of Representatives from Illinois's 19th district
- In office March 4, 1875 – March 3, 1877
- Preceded by: Samuel S. Marshall
- Succeeded by: Richard W. Townshend

Member of the Illinois Senate
- In office 1871-1875

Personal details
- Born: April 2, 1830 Mount Vernon, Illinois
- Died: August 28, 1901 (aged 71) Chicago, Illinois
- Party: Independent

William Black Anderson (April 2, 1830 – August 28, 1901) was a member of the United States House of Representatives from Illinois.

Anderson was born April 2, 1830, in Mount Vernon, Illinois to Stinson Anderson who would serve as Lt. Governor of Illinois. He attended McKendree College and studied law. Despite being admitted to the bar, he never practiced law, instead pursuing agricultural work as a farmer and surveyor. He was elected Jefferson County Surveyor in 1851. He was elected to the Illinois House of Representatives in 1856 and 1858. He also passed the Illinois bar in 1858.

During the American Civil War, Anderson entered the Union Army as a private, eventually rising to the rank of colonel of the 60th Illinois Volunteer Infantry Regiment. Anderson resigned from the army on December 26, 1864. On January 13, 1866, President Andrew Johnson nominated Anderson for appointment to the grade of brevet brigadier general of volunteers to rank from March 13, 1865, and the United States Senate confirmed the appointment on March 12, 1866.

In 1869, Anderson was a member of the Illinois Constitutional Convention. In 1871, Anderson was elected to the Illinois Senate. In 1874, he was elected to the U.S. House of Representatives as an independent. After one term, he left politics, eventually taking a job with the Internal Revenue Service in 1885–1889 and as a United States pension agent from December 1893 to January 1898.

William Black Anderson died in Chicago, Illinois, on August 28, 1901. He was buried in Oakwood Cemetery, Mount Vernon, Illinois.

== Notes ==
- United States Congress. "William B. Anderson (id: A000236)". Biographical Directory of the United States Congress.
- Eicher, John H., and David J. Eicher, Civil War High Commands. Stanford: Stanford University Press, 2001. ISBN 978-0-8047-3641-1.

U.S. House of Representatives
Preceded by Samuel S. Marshall	Member of the U.S. House of Representatives from Illinois's 19th congressional district 1875-1877	Succeeded by Richard W. Townshend
