= James C. Allen =

American politician (1822–1912)

James Cameron Allen
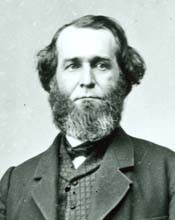

Clerk of the United States House of Representatives
- In office 1857–1860
- Speaker: James Lawrence Orr
- Preceded by: William Cullom
- Succeeded by: John W. Forney

Member of the U.S. House of Representatives from Illinois's at-large district
- In office March 4, 1863 – March 3, 1865
- Preceded by: District created
- Succeeded by: Samuel W. Moulton

Member of the U.S. House of Representatives from Illinois's 7th district
- In office March 4, 1853 – July 18, 1856
- Preceded by: Richard Yates
- Succeeded by: Vacant
- In office November 4, 1856 – March 3, 1857
- Preceded by: Vacant
- Succeeded by: Aaron Shaw

Member of the Illinois House of Representatives from the 10th district
- In office January 6, 1851 – January 3, 1853
- Preceded by: Richard G. Morris
- Succeeded by: William H. Sterrett

Personal details
- Born: January 29, 1822 Shelby County, Kentucky, U.S.
- Died: January 30, 1912 (aged 90) Olney, Illinois, U.S.
- Party: Democratic Party
- Spouse(s): Ellen Kitchell; Julia Kitchell
- Children: 3 children by his first marriage, 7 by his second
- Occupation: Attorney, Judge

James Cameron Allen (January 29, 1822 – January 30, 1912) was a U.S. representative from Illinois.

Born in Shelby County, Kentucky to Benjamin and Margaret (née Youel) Allen, the seventh of ten children. His family moved to Parke County, Indiana in 1830.

Allen read law in the office of Howard & Wright in Rockville, Indiana, and in August, 1843, he was admitted to the bar and began to practice in Sullivan, Indiana. He served as prosecuting attorney for the seventh judicial district of Indiana 1846–1848 before moving to Palestine, Illinois, where he continued to practice law. He served as a member of the Illinois House of Representatives from the 10th district from 1851 to 1853.

Allen was elected as a Democrat to the Thirty-third Congress (March 4, 1853 – March 3, 1855). When he presented his credentials as a Member-elect to the Thirty-fourth Congress and served from March 4, 1855, to July 18, 1856, the House decided he was not entitled to the seat due to a challenge by Colonel William B. Archer, who claimed there were irregularities in the election.

Allen was subsequently elected to fill the vacancy thus caused and was allowed to serve from November 4, 1856, to March 3, 1857. He was not a candidate for renomination in 1856. Following his term in office, he served as the Clerk of the House of Representatives in the Thirty-fifth Congress from 1857 to 1859. He was an unsuccessful candidate for Illinois Governor in 1860, losing to Richard Yates.

In 1861 Governor Yates offered Allen the command of the 21st Illinois Infantry Regiment. Allen declined, claiming no military experiences and recommended that the command be offered to Ulysses S. Grant.

Allen was elected circuit court judge in April 1861 and served until he resigned in 1863 to serve a second term in Congress during the Thirty-eighth Congress (March 4, 1863 – March 3, 1865). He was an unsuccessful candidate for reelection in 1864, losing to Shelbyville, Illinois state legislator Samuel W. Moulton. He returned to Illinois to practice law.

He was reelected circuit court judge in 1873 and upon the establishment of the appellate court was appointed its judge, occupying both positions and serving from 1873 to 1879.

== Private life ==
Allen married Ellen Kitchell on January 22, 1845, to Ellen Kitchell, the daughter of Joseph Kitchell. They had three children. Ellen Allen died in May, 1852. In June, 1857, Allen married Julia Kitchell, the daughter of Harvey Kitchell. He had seven more children with his second wife.

He moved to Olney, Illinois, in 1876 and practiced law until he retired in 1907.

He died in Olney on January 30, 1912, the day after his 90th birthday, and is buried in Olney Cemetery.

Party political offices
Preceded by William Alexander Richardson	Democratic nominee for Governor of Illinois; 1860	Succeeded by James Carroll Robinson
U.S. House of Representatives
Preceded by Richard Yates	Member of the U.S. House of Representatives from Illinois's 7th congressional district March 4, 1853 – July 18, 1856	Succeeded by Vacant
Preceded by Vacant	Member of the U.S. House of Representatives from Illinois's 7th congressional district November 4, 1856 – March 3, 1857	Succeeded by Aaron Shaw
Preceded by District elections	Member of the U.S. House of Representatives from Illinois's at-large congressional district March 4, 1863 – March 3, 1865	Succeeded by Samuel W. Moulton
Government offices
Preceded by William Cullom	Clerk of the United States House of Representatives; 1857–1860	Succeeded by John W. Forney
