= John B. Hay =

American politician (1834–1916)

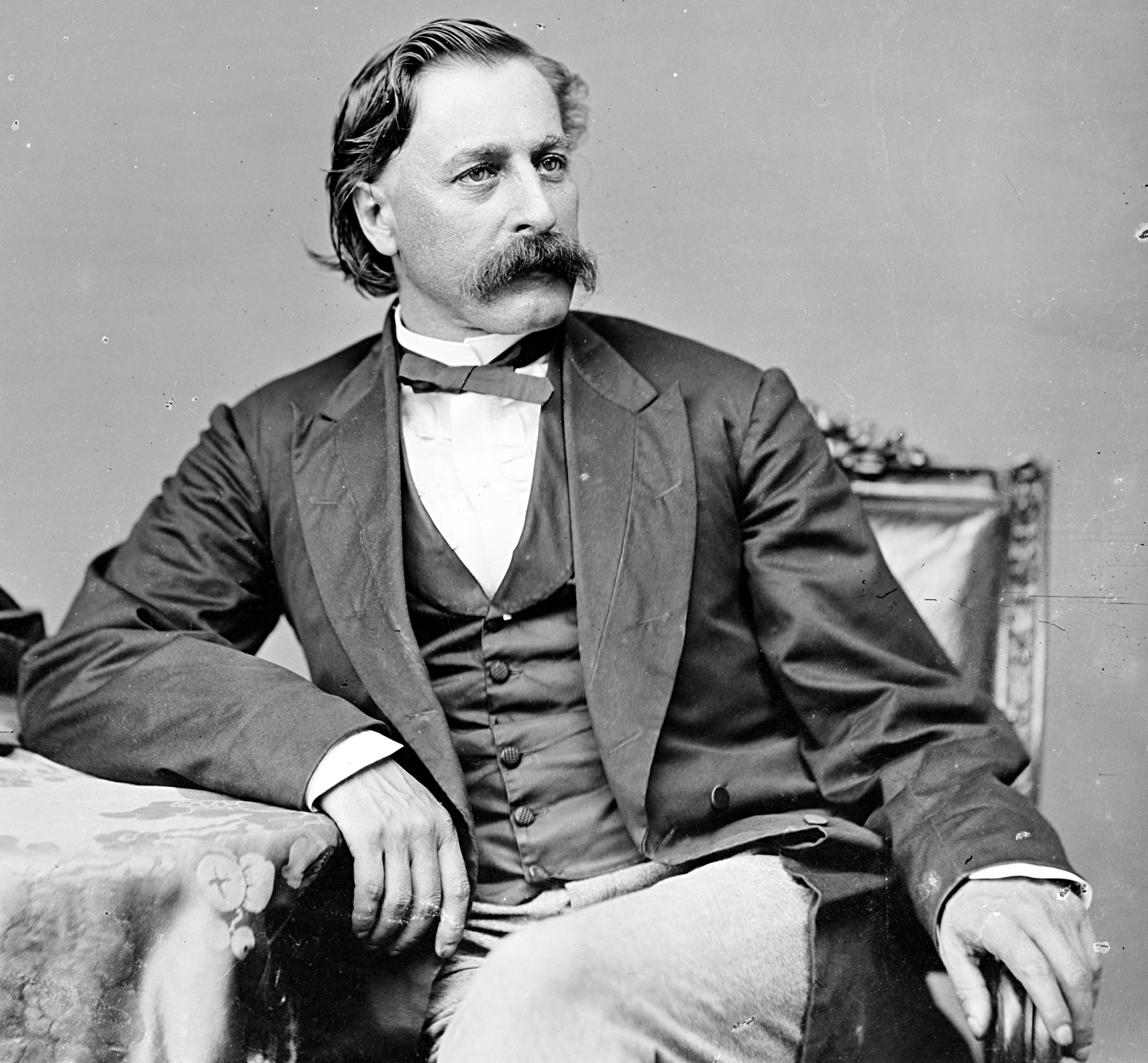

Member of the U.S. House of Representatives from Illinois's 12th district
- In office March 4, 1869 – March 3, 1873
- Preceded by: Jehu Baker
- Succeeded by: James Carroll Robinson

Personal details
- Born: January 8, 1834 Belleville, Illinois, U.S.
- Died: June 29, 1916 (aged 82) Chicago, Illinois, U.S.
- Party: Republican
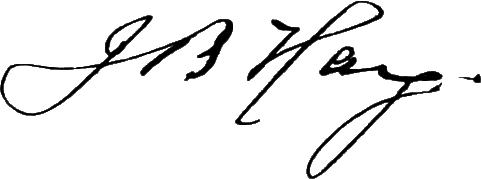
- Signature

John Breese Hay (January 8, 1834 – June 29, 1916) was an American politician who served as a U.S. representative from Illinois.

== Biography ==
John B. Hay was born in Belleville, St. Clair County, Illinois on January 8, 1834. He received a common school education, worked on a farm, and as a printer, after which he studied law.

He was admitted to the bar in 1851 and commenced practice in Belleville. He served as prosecuting attorney for the twenty-fourth judicial district of Illinois from1860-1868. He served as a delegate to the Republican State convention in 1860. He served in the Union Army during the Civil War in the 130th Illinois Infantry Regiment.

Hay was elected as a Republican to the Forty-first and Forty-second Congress (March 4, 1869 – March 3, 1873). He was an unsuccessful candidate for reelection in 1872 to the Forty-third Congress and for election in 1880 to the Forty-seventh Congress. He resumed the practice of law in Belleville, and served as postmaster there from 1881 to 1885. He served as judge of St. Clair County Court from 1886-1900. He served as mayor of Belleville from 1901 to 1905, when he resigned, after being re-elected county judge, and served until 1914. He died at his son's home in Chicago on June 29, 1916. He was interred in Green Mount Cemetery.

U.S. House of Representatives
Preceded by Jehu Baker	Member of the U.S. House of Representatives from Illinois's 12th congressional district 1869-1873	Succeeded by James C. Robinson
