= Samuel W. Moulton =

American politician

Samuel Wheeler Moulton
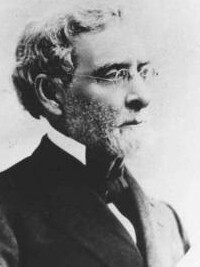
- S. W. Moulton (1821-1905)

Member of the U.S. House of Representatives from Illinois
- In office March 4, 1883 – March 3, 1885
- Preceded by: William Ralls Morrison
- Succeeded by: John R. Eden
- Constituency: 17th district
- In office March 4, 1881 – March 3, 1883
- Preceded by: Albert P. Forsythe
- Succeeded by: Joseph Gurney Cannon
- Constituency: 15th district
- In office March 4, 1865 – March 3, 1867
- Preceded by: James C. Allen
- Succeeded by: John A. Logan
- Constituency: at-large district

President of the Illinois State Board of Education
- In office July 1, 1859 – 1876

Member of the Illinois House of Representatives
- In office 1852–1859

Personal details
- Born: January 20, 1821 Wenham, Essex County, Massachusetts, U.S.
- Died: June 3, 1905 (aged 84) Shelbyville, Illinois, U.S.
- Resting place: Glenwood Cemetery
- Party: Democratic
- Other political affiliations: Republican (after 1867)

Samuel Wheeler Moulton (January 20, 1821 – June 3, 1905) was an educator, university trustee, attorney, state legislator, and U.S. representative from Illinois.

== Early life ==
Samuel Wheeler Moulton was born in Wenham, Essex County, Massachusetts, the son of William Moulton (1775–1858) and Mary Lunt Moulton (1776–1850). The Moulton family was one of old Massachusetts stock, with Samuel descending from James Moulton, who likely arrived in Essex County from Norfolk, England in the early 1630s.

Moulton attended public schools in Essex County. After completing his primary and secondary education, he moved to Kentucky, where he taught school for several years, and then to Mississippi where he continued to teach. While teaching in Mississippi, Samuel met Mary H. Affleck, and they married in 1844. Census records show they were married in 1844, but the 1776-1935 Mississippi Marriage Index does not show a marriage between the two. Similarly, the 1763-1900 Illinois Marriage Index does not show a record of marriage between Samuel and Mary. In that same year in Yazoo City, he cast his first vote for president for the Whig candidate James Knox Polk.

== Legal, military and political career ==
The newly married Moultons moved to Illinois in 1845 and settled in Oakland, Coles County. Mrs. Moulton's parents had moved north to Illinois eight years prior, and this was likely an influence for them to start their young lives in the Prairie State. Once settled in, he commenced the study of law. He was admitted to the bar in 1847 and started a practice in Sullivan, Illinois, and also was raised as a Mason that same year. He moved to Shelbyville, Illinois, in 1849 and continued the practice of law. Moulton was a contemporary of another Central Illinois circuit-riding attorney named Abraham Lincoln.

Moulton and Lincoln were co-counsel on a legal case on May 25, 1852, in Shelbyville. In Shelby County Circuit Court, Lincoln and Moulton appeared in the slander case Johnson v. Hardy, with Hardy being jointly-defended by Lincoln and Moulton. With Circuit Judge, future United States Senator, and future United States Supreme Court Justice David Davis hearing the case, a jury was empaneled, and Hardy was found guilty of slander and fined $50.00, with an additional $9.85 for court costs.

Moulton's first venture into electoral politics was when he ran for and won a seat in the Illinois House of Representatives, serving representing his adopted hometown from 1852 through 1859. Despite a relatively short tenure in that chamber, he spearheaded free public education for all Illinois residents and the establishment of teaching college, now known as Illinois State University. He was also a presidential elector on the Democratic ticket in 1856, won by James Buchanan.

Moulton additionally served as the inaugural president of the Illinois State Board of Education from 1859 through 1876, taking office July 1, 1859, after being voted as the board's president by the board members.

Although not widely documented, Moulton served during the Civil War in the United States Army Provost Marshal General as the enrollment commissioner for the 10th District of Illinois, at Shelbyville. He was not clearly a well-regarded member of this organization, as President Lincoln personally wrote to Moulton on July 31, 1863. Lincoln wrote that he had been "strongly urged on the ground of persistent disobedience of orders and neglect of duty" to remove Moulton from his position. Lincoln further wrote that he was ". . . unwilling to do anything in your case which may seem unnecessarily harsh, or at variance with the feelings of personal respect and esteem, with which I have always regarded you." He concluded by writing, "[i]t is unnecessary for me to state however, that when differences of opinion arise between officers of the Government, the ranking officer must be obeyed. You of course recognize as clearly as I do the importance of this rule. I hope you will conclude to go on in your present position under the regulations of the Department. I wish you would write to me. I am very truly your friend and Obt Servt. A Lincoln"

Moulton responded to his old friend, the President, "Your very kind favor of the 31st Ultimo was missent & was not received until to day ... I regret very much that my superior officers have had case to complain of my seeming neglect of duty. I confess that I have not been constantly at my post on account of sickness in my family & some matters of business that I could not possibly neglect ... My heart is in the work & I want to act honorably ... Would it not be better for me to resign & have another appointed who can better discharge his duty by more constant attendance ... I therefore . . . enclose . . . my resignation." He officially tendered his resignation August 11, 1863.

He was an unsuccessful candidate for election in 1862 to the Thirty-eighth Congress, and was elected as an at-large Republican to the Thirty-ninth Congress (March 4, 1865 – March 3, 1867) over his opponent Hon. James C. Allen by a large plurality. Of note, during the Thirty-ninth Congress, Moulton and fellow Shelbyville attorney Anthony Thornton served as contemporaries in the same chamber. Given that the population of Shelby County had only reached 25,476 residents by 1870, having two of the State's 14 members of the U.S. House of Representatives from 1865 to 1867 was quite impressive. Moulton, highly regarded by many in the Illinois Republican establishment, had his name entered into nomination for another congressional term at the state convention, but "after a meeting of the delegates, and comparison of views had taken place, it was ascertained that the best interests of the party required General Logan. . . Mr. Moulton cheerfully declined being a candidate, and extended General Logan a warm and enthusiastic support." Moulton and Logan were both former Democrats who turned Republican at the outbreak of the war and both served together in the Illinois House of Representatives in the 1850s.

Moulton ran for Governor of Illinois in 1868, "but having no war record, he was shelved by the military element in the convention." He was defeated by John Palmer, who went on to win the general election.

Sometime after Moulton left federal elected office in 1867, he disaffiliated with the Republican Party. He was elected as a Democrat to the Forty-seventh and Forty-eighth Congresses (March 4, 1881 – March 3, 1885) and served as chairman of the Committee on Mileage (Forty-eighth Congress).

He was not a candidate for renomination in 1884.

== Post-Congressional life ==
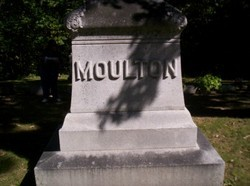

After his final stint in Congress, Moulton then resumed the practice of law in Shelbyville. He was affiliated with the Republican Party after 1896.

The Moulton home, an Italianate mansion built in 1875, is located at 607 South Broadway Street in Shelbyville and is part of the Lincoln Memorial History Tour.

Samuel Moutlon died at his home in Shelbyville on June 3, 1905, at the age of 84 and was buried in Glenwood Cemetery. An elaborate funeral was held in Shelbyville, with full Masonic honors. Mrs. Moulton followed her husband in death in 1921. They are interred aside each other.

== Legacy ==
Built in 1920, Moulton Hall at Illinois State University in Normal, Illinois, is named after Moulton and houses various administrative offices for the university as well as the Department of Physics. In order to keep the fledgling institution afloat during the Civil War, Moulton mortgaged his own property.

During his lifetime, a small settlement in Rose Township, directly southwest of Shelbyville, was also named Moulton. In 1850, there were over 100 residents, and at a gathering there, Michael Gregory, Moulton, and Anthony Thornton drew straws. Moulton drew the long straw, and the town was named for him. It was annexed by City of Shelbyville in 1877 and became known as the Citizens Addition. In Shelbyville, the middle school, the former Moulton United Methodist Church and Moulton Drive are all named in his honor.

A large oil portrait of Moulton, painted by famous Shelbyville artist Robert Marshall Root, hangs in the large circuit courtroom in the historic Shelby County Courthouse where he practiced for decades.

U.S. House of Representatives
Preceded by James C. Allen	Member of the U.S. House of Representatives from Illinois's at-large congressional district March 4, 1865 – March 3, 1867	Succeeded by John A. Logan
Preceded by Albert P. Forsythe	Member of the U.S. House of Representatives from Illinois's 15th congressional district March 4, 1881 – March 3, 1883	Succeeded by Joseph G. Cannon
Preceded by William R. Morrison	Member of the U.S. House of Representatives from Illinois's 17th congressional district March 4, 1883 – March 3, 1885	Succeeded by John R. Eden
