= Aaron Shaw =

American politician (1811–1887)

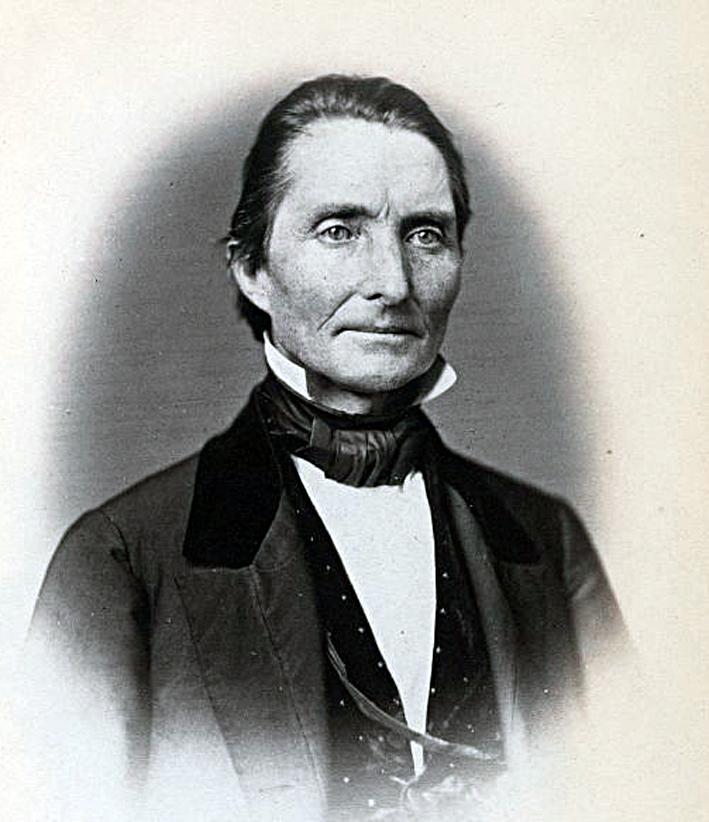

Member of the U.S. House of Representatives from Illinois's 16th district
- In office March 4, 1883 – March 3, 1885
- Preceded by: James C. Allen
- Succeeded by: James C. Robinson

Member of the U.S. House of Representatives from Illinois's 7th district
- In office March 4, 1857 – March 3, 1859
- Preceded by: William A. J. Sparks
- Succeeded by: Silas Z. Landes

Member of the Illinois House of Representatives
- In office 1850

Personal details
- Born: December 19, 1811 near Goshen, New York, U.S.
- Died: January 7, 1887 (aged 75) Olney, Illinois, U.S.
- Party: Democratic
- Occupation: Lawyer, judge

Aaron Shaw (December 19, 1811 – January 7, 1887) was a U.S. representative from Illinois.

Born near Goshen, New York, Shaw attended Montgomery Academy, New York. He studied law in Goshen. He was admitted to the bar in 1833 and commenced practice in Lawrenceville, Illinois. He served as a delegate to Illinois' first Internal Improvement Convention.

Shaw was elected State's attorney by the Legislature of Illinois in 1842. He served as a member of the Illinois House of Representatives in 1850.

Shaw was elected as a Democrat to the Thirty-fifth Congress (March 4, 1857 – March 3, 1859). He was not a candidate for renomination in 1858. He was again a member of the Illinois House of Representatives in 1860, and served as circuit judge of the fourth judicial district of Illinois from 1863 to 1869.

Shaw was elected to the Forty-eighth Congress (March 4, 1883 – March 3, 1885). He was not a candidate for renomination in 1884, and subsequently resumed the practice of law. He died in Olney, Illinois, on January 7, 1887. He was interred in Haven Hill Cemetery.

U.S. House of Representatives
Preceded by James C. Allen	Member of the U.S. House of Representatives from Illinois's 7th congressional district 1857-1859	Succeeded by James C. Robinson
Preceded by William A. J. Sparks	Member of the U.S. House of Representatives from Illinois's 16th congressional district 1883-1885	Succeeded by Silas Z. Landes
