= Samuel S. Marshall =

American politician (1821–1890)

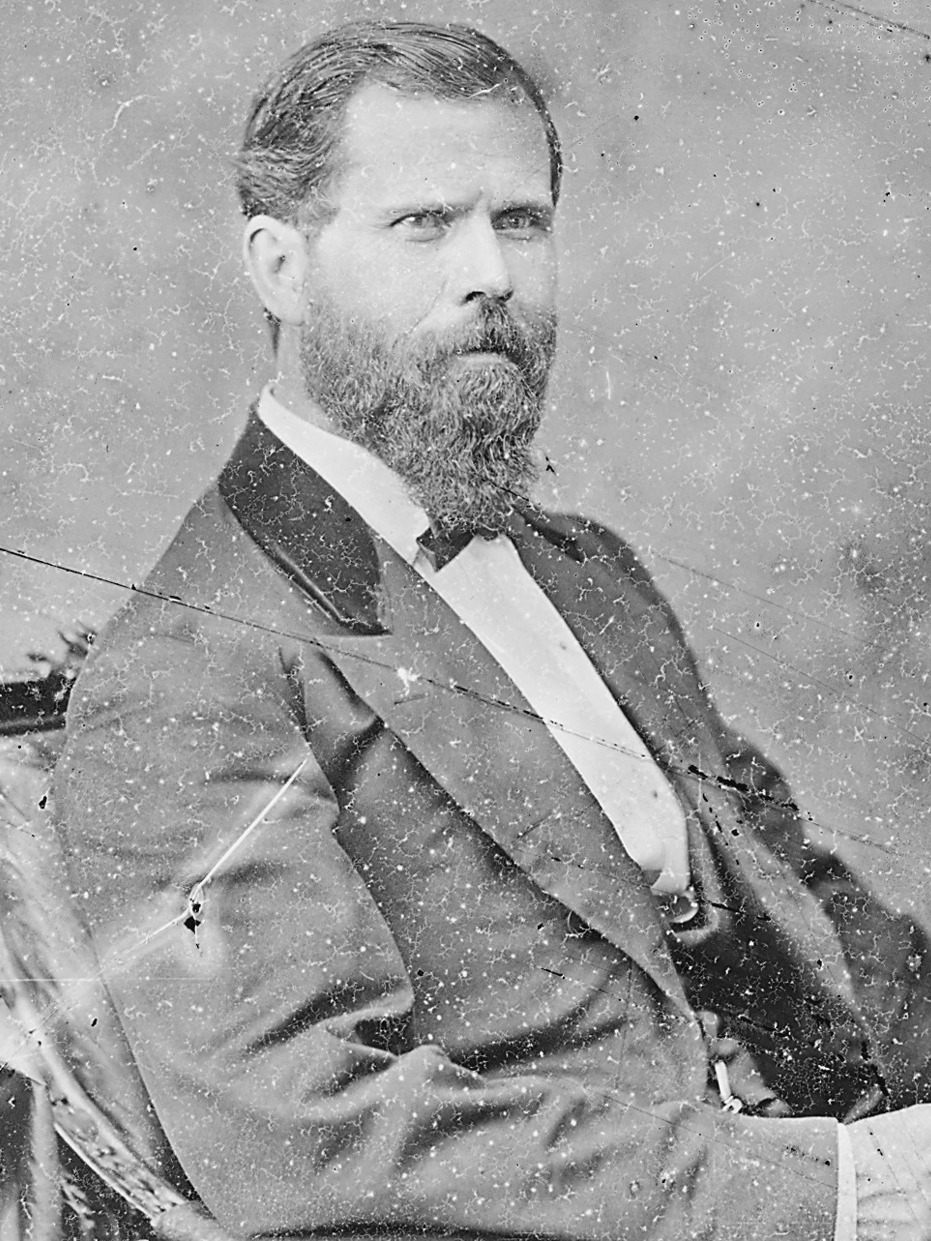

Member of the U.S. House of Representatives from Illinois
- In office March 4, 1865 – March 3, 1875
- Preceded by: James Carroll Robinson
- Succeeded by: William B. Anderson
- Constituency: 11th district (1865–1873); 19th district (1873–1875)
- In office March 4, 1855 – March 4, 1859
- Preceded by: Willis Allen
- Succeeded by: John A. Logan
- Constituency: 9th district

Member of the Illinois House of Representatives
- In office 1846–1847

Personal details
- Born: March 12, 1821 Shawneetown, Illinois, U.S.
- Died: July 26, 1890 (aged 69) McLeansboro, Illinois, U.S.
- Party: Democratic

Samuel Scott Marshall (March 12, 1821 – July 26, 1890) was an American politician and attorney who served a total of seven terms as a U.S. representative from Illinois. He was a member of the Democratic Party.

== Early life and education ==
Born near Shawneetown, Illinois, Marshall attended public and private schools in McLeansboro, Illinois, and Cumberland College in Kentucky. He studied law, was admitted to the bar in 1845, and commenced practice in McLeansboro.

== Political career ==
Marshall served as member of the Illinois House of Representatives in 1846 and 1847. He then served as State's Attorney for the third judicial circuit of Illinois in 1847 and 1848, and as an Illinois circuit court judge from 1851 until 1854.

=== First tenure in the U.S. House of Representatives (1855–1859) ===
Marshall was elected as a Democrat to the 34th and 35th United States Congresses, serving consecutively from 1855 to 1859. He served as chairman of the Committee on Claims during the 35th Congress.

=== 1861 U.S. Senate candidacy ===
He was the candidate of his party for United States Senator in 1861, but lost to incumbent Republican Lyman Trumbull, with Trumbull receiving 54 votes in the Illinois House of Representatives to Marshall's 46 votes on January 9, 1861.

Marshall again served as an Illinois Circuit Court judge from 1861 until 1864. He served as a delegate to 1860 and 1864 Democratic National Conventions.

=== Second tenure in the U.S. House of Representatives (1865–1875) ===
Marshall was elected to the 39th United States Congress and to the four following Congresses (serving March 4, 1865 – March 4, 1875), and was the candidate of his party for Speaker of the House in 1867. He represented Illinois's 11th district for four terms and, after redistricting, represented the 19th district for his final term. Marshall was a delegate to the 1866 National Union Convention.

During the 40th Congress, Marshall served on the House Committee on the Judiciary, which was conducting the first impeachment inquiry against President Andrew Johnson. On November 25, 1867, the committee voted 5–4 to recommend impeachment. Hinds was on the minority side opposing impeachment, along with the one other Democrat on the committee and two Republicans. On December 7, 1867, Marshall was joined by 108 other congressmen (including 66 members of the Republican Party in a full House vote which defeated the resolution put forward to impeach Johnson by 57–108.

On January 28, 1868, Marshall voted against a resolution launching the second impeachment inquiry against Johnson, but the resolution passed 99–31. On December 7, 1867, Marshall voted against the impeachment of Andrew Johnson, which the house passed 126–47. On March 2 and 3, 1968, Marshall voted against all eleven articles of impeachment. When it came time, on March 2, 1868, to vote on who to appoint as the House's impeachment managers (those House members that would prosecutors during the trial), Speaker Shuyler Colfax initially appointed Marshall to act as a teller to tally the vote. However, Marshall requested to be excused from this role, and he, along with the rest of the Democrats, ultimately abstained from voting on impeachment managers.

He was an unsuccessful candidate for reelection in 1874 to the 44th Congress.

=== Later career ===
Marshall served as president of the board of managers of Hamilton College from 1875 through 1880. He again served as a delegate to the Democratic National Convention in 1880.

== Death ==
He died in McLeansboro, Illinois, on July 26, 1890. He was interred in Odd Fellows Cemetery.

U.S. House of Representatives
Preceded by Willis Allen	Member of the U.S. House of Representatives from Illinois's 9th congressional district 1855–1859	Succeeded by John A. Logan
Preceded by James C. Robinson	Member of the U.S. House of Representatives from Illinois's 11th congressional district 1865–1873	Succeeded by Robert M. Knapp
Preceded by District created	Member of the U.S. House of Representatives from Illinois's 19th congressional district 1873–1875	Succeeded by William B. Anderson
