= List of United States representatives from Illinois =

The following is an alphabetical list of United States representatives from the state of Illinois. For chronological tables of members of both houses of the United States Congress from the state (through the present day), see Illinois's congressional delegations. The list of names should be complete as of January 3, 2019, but other data may be incomplete. Illinois became the 21st state on December 3, 1818.

== Current representatives ==
- 1st district: Jonathan Jackson (D) (since 2023)
- 2nd district: Robin Kelly (D) (since 2013)
- 3rd district: Delia Ramirez (D) (since 2023)
- 4th district: Jesús "Chuy" García (D) (since 2019)
- 5th district: Mike Quigley (D) (since 2009)
- 6th district: Sean Casten (D) (since 2019)
- 7th district: Danny K. Davis (D) (since 1997)
- 8th district: Raja Krishnamoorthi (D) (since 2017)
- 9th district: Jan Schakowsky (D) (since 1999)
- 10th district: Brad Schneider (D) (2013–2015, since 2017)
- 11th district: Bill Foster (D) (14th 2008–2011, since 2013)
- 12th district: Mike Bost (R) (since 2015)
- 13th district: Nikki Budzinski (D) (since 2023)
- 14th district: Lauren Underwood (D) (since 2019)
- 15th district: Mary Miller (R) (since 2021)
- 16th district: Darin LaHood (R) (since 2015)
- 17th district: Eric Sorensen (D) (since 2023)

== List of members and delegates ==
Member / Delegate	Party	District	Years	Electoral history
J. Leroy Adair	Democratic	15th	March 4, 1933 – January 3, 1937	[data missing]
George E. Adams	Republican	4th	March 4, 1883 – March 4, 1891	[data missing]
Charles Adkins	Republican	19th	March 4, 1925 – March 4, 1933	[data missing]
J. Frank Aldrich	Republican	1st	March 4, 1893 – March 4, 1897	[data missing]
William Aldrich	Republican	1st	March 4, 1877 – March 4, 1883	[data missing]
James C. Allen	Democratic	7th	March 4, 1853 – July 18, 1856	House declared not entitled to seat
James C. Allen	Democratic	7th	November 4, 1856 – March 4, 1857	Re-elected to fill own vacancy
James C. Allen	Democratic	At-large	March 4, 1863 – March 4, 1865	[data missing]
John Clayton Allen	Republican	14th	March 4, 1925 – March 4, 1933	[data missing]
Leo E. Allen	Republican	13th	March 4, 1933 – January 3, 1949	[data missing]
Leo E. Allen	Republican	16th	January 3, 1949 – January 3, 1961	[data missing]
William J. Allen	Democratic	9th	June 2, 1862 – March 4, 1863	[data missing]
William J. Allen	Democratic	13th	March 4, 1863 – March 4, 1865	[data missing]
Willis Allen	Democratic	2nd	March 4, 1851 – March 4, 1853	[data missing]
Willis Allen	Democratic	9th	March 4, 1853 – March 4, 1855	[data missing]
George A. Anderson	Democratic	12th	March 4, 1887 – March 4, 1889	[data missing]
John B. Anderson	Republican	16th	January 3, 1961 – January 3, 1981	[data missing]
William B. Anderson	Independent	19th	March 4, 1875 – March 4, 1877	[data missing]
Frank Annunzio	Democratic	7th	January 3, 1965 – January 3, 1973	[data missing]
Frank Annunzio	Democratic	11th	January 3, 1973 – January 3, 1993	[data missing]
Leslie C. Arends	Republican	17th	January 3, 1935 – January 3, 1973	[data missing]
Leslie C. Arends	Republican	15th	January 3, 1973 – December 31, 1974	Resigned
Isaac N. Arnold	Republican	2nd	March 4, 1861 – March 4, 1863	[data missing]
Isaac N. Arnold	Republican	1st	March 4, 1863 – March 4, 1865	[data missing]
Laurence F. Arnold	Democratic	23rd	January 3, 1937 – January 3, 1943	[data missing]
William W. Arnold	Democratic	23rd	March 4, 1923 – September 16, 1935	Resigned to become a member of the US Board of Tax Appeals
John C. Bagby	Democratic	10th	March 4, 1875 – March 4, 1877	[data missing]
Edward Dickinson Baker	Whig	7th	March 4, 1845 – January 15, 1847	Resigned after being commissioned colonel of the 4th Regiment of the Illinois Volunteer Infantry
Edward Dickinson Baker	Whig	6th	March 4, 1849 – March 4, 1851	[data missing]
Jehu Baker	Republican	12th	March 4, 1865 – March 4, 1869	[data missing]
Jehu Baker	Republican	18th	March 4, 1887 – March 4, 1889	[data missing]
Jehu Baker	Democratic	21st	March 4, 1897 – March 4, 1899	[data missing]
William N. Baltz	Democratic	22nd	March 4, 1913 – March 4, 1915	[data missing]
Hiram Barber Jr.	Republican	3rd	March 4, 1879 – March 4, 1881	[data missing]
James M. Barnes	Democratic	20th	January 3, 1939 – January 3, 1943	[data missing]
Granville Barrere	Republican	9th	March 4, 1873 – March 4, 1875	[data missing]
Harry P. Beam	Democratic	4th	March 4, 1931 – December 6, 1942	Resigned after being elected judge of the Municipal Court of Chicago
Melissa Bean	Democratic	8th	January 3, 2005 – January 3, 2011	[data missing]
Hugh R. Belknap	Republican	3rd	December 27, 1895 – March 4, 1899	Won contested election
John Lourie Beveridge	Republican	At-large	November 7, 1871 – January 4, 1873	Resigned to become Lieutenant Governor
Judy Biggert	Republican	13th	January 3, 1999 – January 3, 2013	[data missing]
C. W. Bishop	Republican	25th	January 3, 1941 – January 3, 1949	[data missing]
C. W. Bishop	Republican	26th	January 3, 1949 – January 3, 1953	[data missing]
C. W. Bishop	Republican	25th	January 3, 1953 – January 3, 1955	[data missing]
William H. Bissell	Democratic	1st	March 4, 1849 – March 4, 1853	[data missing]
William H. Bissell	Independent Democratic	8th	March 4, 1853 – March 4, 1855	[data missing]
John C. Black	Democratic	At-large	March 4, 1893 – January 12, 1895	Resigned to become U.S. Attorney
Rod R. Blagojevich	Democratic	5th	January 3, 1997 – January 3, 2003	[data missing]
Shadrach Bond	Democratic-Republican	Territory	December 3, 1812 – August 2, 1813	[data missing]
Charles M. Borchers	Democratic	19th	March 4, 1913 – March 4, 1915	[data missing]
Mike Bost	Republican	12th	January 3, 2015 – present	Incumbent
Henry S. Boutell	Republican	6th	November 23, 1897 – March 4, 1903	[data missing]
Henry S. Boutell	Republican	9th	March 4, 1903 – March 4, 1911	[data missing]
James B. Bowler	Democratic	7th	July 7, 1953 – July 18, 1957	Died
Thomas A. Boyd	Republican	9th	March 4, 1877 – March 4, 1881	[data missing]
Lewis L. Boyer	Democratic	15th	January 3, 1937 – January 3, 1939	[data missing]
Charles A. Boyle	Democratic	12th	January 3, 1955 – November 4, 1959	Died
Martin A. Brennan	Democratic	At-large	March 4, 1933 – January 3, 1937	[data missing]
Lorenzo Brentano	Republican	3rd	March 4, 1877 – March 4, 1879	[data missing]
Frederick A. Britten	Republican	9th	March 4, 1913 – January 3, 1935	[data missing]
Henry P.H. Bromwell	Republican	7th	March 4, 1865 – March 4, 1869	[data missing]
Edwin B. Brooks	Republican	23rd	March 4, 1919 – March 4, 1923	[data missing]
Terry L. Bruce	Democratic	19th	January 3, 1985 – January 3, 1993	[data missing]
Frank Buchanan	Democratic	7th	March 4, 1911 – March 4, 1917	[data missing]
John T. Buckbee	Republican	12th	March 4, 1927 – April 23, 1936	Died
James R. Buckley	Democratic	6th	March 4, 1923 – March 4, 1925	[data missing]
James V. Buckley	Democratic	4th	January 3, 1949 – January 3, 1951	[data missing]
Nikki Budzinski	Democratic	13th	January 3, 2023 – present	Incumbent
Horatio C. Burchard	Republican	3rd	December 6, 1869 – March 4, 1873	[data missing]
Horatio C. Burchard	Republican	5th	March 4, 1873 – March 4, 1879	[data missing]
Albert G. Burr	Democratic	10th	March 4, 1867 – March 4, 1871	[data missing]
Orlando Burrell	Republican	20th	March 4, 1895 – March 4, 1897	[data missing]
Fred E. Busbey	Republican	3rd	January 3, 1943 – January 3, 1945	[data missing]
Samuel T. Busey	Democratic	15th	March 4, 1891 – March 4, 1893	[data missing]
Cheri Bustos	Democratic	17th	January 3, 2013 – January 3, 2023	Retired.
Emmet F. Byrne	Republican	3rd	January 3, 1957 – January 3, 1959	[data missing]
Benjamin T. Cable	Democratic	11th	March 4, 1891 – March 4, 1893	[data missing]
Ben F. Caldwell	Democratic	17th	March 4, 1899 – March 4, 1903	[data missing]
Ben F. Caldwell	Democratic	21st	March 4, 1903 – March 4, 1905	[data missing]
Ben F. Caldwell	Democratic	21st	March 4, 1907 – March 4, 1909	[data missing]
Alexander Campbell	Independent	7th	March 4, 1875 – March 4, 1877	[data missing]
James R. Campbell	Democratic	20th	March 4, 1897 – March 4, 1899	[data missing]
Thompson Campbell	Democratic	6th	March 4, 1851 – March 4, 1853	[data missing]
Joseph G. Cannon	Republican	14th	March 4, 1873 – March 4, 1883	[data missing]
Joseph G. Cannon	Republican	15th	March 4, 1883 – March 4, 1891	[data missing]
Joseph G. Cannon	Republican	15th	March 4, 1893 – March 4, 1895	[data missing]
Joseph G. Cannon	Republican	12th	March 4, 1895 – March 4, 1903	[data missing]
Joseph G. Cannon	Republican	18th	March 4, 1903 – March 4, 1913	[data missing]
Joseph G. Cannon	Republican	18th	March 4, 1915 – March 4, 1923	[data missing]
Cliffard D. Carlson	Republican	15th	April 4, 1972 – January 3, 1973	[data missing]
Zadok Casey	Jacksonian	2nd	March 4, 1833 – March 4, 1837	[data missing]
Zadok Casey	Democratic	2nd	March 4, 1837 – March 4, 1841	[data missing]
Zadok Casey	Independent Democratic	2nd	March 4, 1841 – March 4, 1843	[data missing]
Sean Casten	Democratic	6th	January 3, 2019 – present	Incumbent
Bernard G. Caulfield	Democratic	1st	February 1, 1875 – March 4, 1877	[data missing]
Edwin V. Champion	Democratic	At-large	January 3, 1937 – January 3, 1939	[data missing]
Pleasant T. Chapman	Republican	24th	March 4, 1905 – March 4, 1911	[data missing]
Chester A. Chesney	Democratic	11th	January 3, 1949 – January 3, 1951	[data missing]
Robert A. Childs	Republican	8th	March 4, 1893 – March 4, 1895	[data missing]
Carl R. Chindblom	Republican	10th	March 4, 1919 – March 4, 1933	[data missing]
Burnett M. Chiperfield	Republican	At-large	March 4, 1915 – March 4, 1917	[data missing]
Burnett M. Chiperfield	Republican	15th	November 4, 1930 – March 4, 1933	[data missing]
Robert B. Chiperfield	Republican	15th	January 3, 1939 – January 3, 1949	[data missing]
Robert B. Chiperfield	Republican	19th	January 3, 1949 – January 3, 1963	[data missing]
Marguerite S. Church	Republican	13th	January 3, 1951 – January 3, 1963	[data missing]
Ralph E. Church	Republican	10th	January 3, 1935 – January 3, 1941	[data missing]
Ralph E. Church	Republican	10th	January 3, 1943 – January 3, 1949	[data missing]
Ralph E. Church	Republican	13th	January 3, 1949 – March 21, 1950	Died
Isaac Clements	Republican	18th	March 4, 1873 – March 4, 1875	[data missing]
Roy Clippinger	Republican	24th	November 6, 1945 – January 3, 1949	[data missing]
Harold R. Collier	Republican	10th	January 3, 1957 – January 3, 1973	[data missing]
Harold R. Collier	Republican	6th	January 3, 1973 – January 3, 1975	[data missing]
Cardiss Collins	Democratic	7th	June 5, 1973 – January 3, 1997	[data missing]
George W. Collins	Democratic	6th	November 3, 1970 – December 8, 1972	Died
James A. Connolly	Republican	17th	March 4, 1895 – March 4, 1899	[data missing]
Burton C. Cook	Republican	6th	March 4, 1865 – August 26, 1871	Resigned
Daniel Pope Cook	Democratic-Republican	At-large	March 4, 1819 – March 4, 1825	[data missing]
Daniel Pope Cook	Anti-Jacksonian	At-large	March 4, 1825 – March 4, 1827	[data missing]
Edward D. Cooke	Republican	6th	March 4, 1895 – June 24, 1897	Died
Ira C. Copley	Republican	11th	March 4, 1911 – March 4, 1915	[data missing]
Ira C. Copley	Progressive	11th	March 4, 1915 – March 4, 1917	[data missing]
Ira C. Copley	Republican	11th	March 4, 1917 – March 4, 1923	[data missing]
Tom Corcoran	Republican	15th	January 3, 1977 – January 3, 1983	[data missing]
Tom Corcoran	Republican	14th	January 3, 1983 – November 28, 1984	Resigned to run for the US Senate
Franklin Corwin	Republican	7th	March 4, 1873 – March 4, 1875	[data missing]
Jerry F. Costello	Democratic	21st	August 9, 1988 – January 3, 1993	[data missing]
Jerry F. Costello	Democratic	12th	January 3, 1993 – January 3, 2013	[data missing]
John W. Cox Jr.	Democratic	16th	January 3, 1991 – January 3, 1993	[data missing]
Dan Crane	Republican	22nd	January 3, 1979 – January 3, 1983	[data missing]
Dan Crane	Republican	19th	January 3, 1983 – January 3, 1985	[data missing]
Philip M. Crane	Republican	13th	November 25, 1969 – January 3, 1973	[data missing]
Philip M. Crane	Republican	12th	January 3, 1973 – January 3, 1993	[data missing]
Philip M. Crane	Republican	8th	January 3, 1993 – January 3, 2005	[data missing]
John M. Crebs	Democratic	13th	March 4, 1869 – March 4, 1873	[data missing]
Joseph B. Crowley	Democratic	19th	March 4, 1899 – March 4, 1903	[data missing]
Joseph B. Crowley	Democratic	23rd	March 4, 1903 – March 4, 1905	[data missing]
William Cullen	Republican	7th	March 4, 1881 – March 4, 1883	[data missing]
William Cullen	Republican	8th	March 4, 1883 – March 4, 1885	[data missing]
Shelby M. Cullom	Republican	8th	March 4, 1865 – March 4, 1871	[data missing]
Thomas Cusack	Democratic	4th	March 4, 1899 – March 4, 1901	[data missing]
Danny K. Davis	Democratic	7th	January 3, 1997 – present	Incumbent
George R. Davis	Republican	2nd	March 4, 1879 – March 4, 1883	[data missing]
George R. Davis	Republican	3rd	March 4, 1883 – March 4, 1885	[data missing]
Jack Davis	Republican	4th	January 3, 1987 – January 3, 1989	[data missing]
Jacob C. Davis	Democratic	5th	November 4, 1856 – March 4, 1857	[data missing]
Rodney Davis	Republican	13th	January 3, 2013 – January 3, 2023	Redistricted to the 13th district and lost renomination to Mary Miller
William L. Dawson	Democratic	1st	January 3, 1943 – November 9, 1970	Died
Stephen A. Day	Republican	At-large	January 3, 1941 – January 3, 1945	[data missing]
Oscar De Priest	Republican	1st	March 4, 1929 – January 3, 1935	[data missing]
Edward E. Denison	Republican	25th	March 4, 1915 – March 4, 1931	[data missing]
Edward J. Derwinski	Republican	4th	January 3, 1959 – January 3, 1983	[data missing]
Charles S. Dewey	Republican	9th	January 3, 1941 – January 3, 1945	[data missing]
Frank S. Dickson	Republican	23rd	March 4, 1905 – March 4, 1907	[data missing]
William H. Dieterich	Democratic	At-large	March 4, 1931 – March 4, 1933	[data missing]
Everett M. Dirksen	Republican	16th	March 4, 1933 – January 3, 1949	[data missing]
Donald C. Dobbins	Democratic	19th	March 4, 1933 – January 3, 1937	[data missing]
Robert Dold	Republican	10th	January 3, 2011 – January 3, 2013	[data missing]
Robert Dold	Republican	10th	January 3, 2015 – January 3, 2017	[data missing]
Emily Taft Douglas	Democratic	At-large	January 3, 1945 – January 3, 1947	[data missing]
Stephen A. Douglas	Democratic	5th	March 4, 1843 – March 3, 1847	Resigned at close of Congress after being elected to the US Senate
Finis E. Downing	Democratic	16th	March 4, 1895 – June 5, 1896	Lost contested election
Thomas A. Doyle	Democratic	4th	November 6, 1923 – March 4, 1931	[data missing]
Tammy Duckworth	Democratic	8th	January 3, 2013 – January 3, 2017	Elected to US Senate
Joseph Duncan	Jacksonian	At-large	March 4, 1827 – March 4, 1833	[data missing]
Joseph Duncan	Jacksonian	3rd	March 4, 1833 – September 21, 1834	Resigned to become Governor of Illinois
Ransom W. Dunham	Republican	1st	March 4, 1883 – March 4, 1889	[data missing]
Richard J. Durbin	Democratic	20th	January 3, 1983 – January 3, 1997	[data missing]
Allan C. Durborow Jr.	Democratic	3rd	March 4, 1891 – March 4, 1895	[data missing]
John R. Eden	Democratic	7th	March 4, 1863 – March 4, 1865	[data missing]
John R. Eden	Democratic	15th	March 4, 1873 – March 4, 1879	[data missing]
John R. Eden	Democratic	17th	March 4, 1885 – March 4, 1887	[data missing]
Reuben Ellwood	Republican	5th	March 4, 1883 – July 1, 1885	Died
Rahm Emanuel	Democratic	5th	January 3, 2003 – January 2, 2009	Resigned to become White House Chief of Staff
Martin Emerich	Democratic	1st	March 4, 1903 – March 4, 1905	[data missing]
William Enyart	Democratic	12th	January 3, 2013 – January 3, 2015	[data missing]
John N. Erlenborn	Republican	14th	January 3, 1965 – January 3, 1983	[data missing]
John N. Erlenborn	Republican	13th	January 3, 1983 – January 3, 1985	[data missing]
Lane Evans	Democratic	17th	January 3, 1983 – January 3, 2007	[data missing]
Lynden Evans	Democratic	9th	March 4, 1911 – March 4, 1913	[data missing]
Thomas W. Ewing	Republican	15th	July 2, 1991 – January 3, 2001	[data missing]
John F. Farnsworth	Republican	2nd	March 4, 1857 – March 4, 1861	[data missing]
John F. Farnsworth	Republican	2nd	March 4, 1863 – March 4, 1873	[data missing]
Charles B. Farwell	Republican	1st	March 4, 1871 – March 4, 1873	[data missing]
Charles B. Farwell	Republican	3rd	March 4, 1873 – May 6, 1876	Lost contested election
Charles B. Farwell	Republican	3rd	March 4, 1881 – March 4, 1883	[data missing]
John G. Fary	Democratic	5th	July 8, 1975 – January 3, 1983	[data missing]
Harris W. Fawell	Republican	13th	January 3, 1985 – January 3, 1999	[data missing]
John J. Feely	Democratic	2nd	March 4, 1901 – March 4, 1903	[data missing]
Orlando B. Ficklin	Democratic	3rd	March 4, 1843 – March 4, 1849	[data missing]
Orlando B. Ficklin	Democratic	3rd	March 4, 1851 – March 4, 1853	[data missing]
Paul Findley	Republican	20th	January 3, 1961 – January 3, 1983	[data missing]
John F. Finerty	Independent Democratic	2nd	March 4, 1883 – March 4, 1885	[data missing]
Edward R. Finnegan	Democratic	12th	January 3, 1961 – January 3, 1963	[data missing]
Edward R. Finnegan	Democratic	9th	January 3, 1963 – December 6, 1964	Resigned to become Judge of the Circuit Court of Cook County, Illinois
George W. Fithian	Democratic	16th	March 4, 1889 – March 4, 1895	[data missing]
Louis Fitzhenry	Democratic	17th	March 4, 1913 – March 4, 1915	[data missing]
Michael Patrick Flanagan	Republican	5th	January 3, 1995 – January 3, 1997	[data missing]
William St. John Forman	Democratic	18th	March 4, 1889 – March 4, 1895	[data missing]
Albert P. Forsythe	Greenback	15th	March 4, 1879 – March 4, 1881	[data missing]
Greenbury L. Fort	Republican	8th	March 4, 1873 – March 4, 1881	[data missing]
George E. Foss	Republican	7th	March 4, 1895 – March 4, 1903	[data missing]
George E. Foss	Republican	10th	March 4, 1903 – March 4, 1913	[data missing]
George E. Foss	Republican	10th	March 4, 1915 – March 4, 1919	[data missing]
Bill Foster	Democratic	14th	March 8, 2008 – January 3, 2011	[data missing]
Bill Foster	Democratic	11th	January 3, 2013 – present	Incumbent
George Peter Foster	Democratic	3rd	March 4, 1899 – March 4, 1903	[data missing]
George Peter Foster	Democratic	4th	March 4, 1903 – March 4, 1905	[data missing]
Martin D. Foster	Democratic	23rd	March 4, 1907 – March 4, 1919	[data missing]
Philip B. Fouke	Democratic	8th	March 4, 1859 – March 4, 1863	[data missing]
H. Robert Fowler	Democratic	24th	March 4, 1911 – March 4, 1915	[data missing]
Frank W. Fries	Democratic	21st	January 3, 1937 – January 3, 1941	[data missing]
Charles Eugene Fuller	Republican	12th	March 4, 1903 – March 4, 1913	[data missing]
Charles Eugene Fuller	Republican	12th	March 4, 1915 – June 25, 1926	Died
Benjamin F. Funk	Republican	14th	March 4, 1893 – March 4, 1895	[data missing]
Frank H. Funk	Republican	17th	March 4, 1921 – March 4, 1927	[data missing]
Thomas Gallagher	Democratic	8th	March 4, 1909 – March 4, 1921	[data missing]
Jesús "Chuy" García	Democratic	4th	January 3, 2019 – present	Incumbent
William H. Gest	Republican	11th	March 4, 1887 – March 4, 1891	[data missing]
Frank Gillespie	Democratic	17th	March 4, 1933 – January 3, 1935	[data missing]
Julius Goldzier	Democratic	4th	March 4, 1893 – March 4, 1895	[data missing]
Thomas S. Gordon	Democratic	8th	January 3, 1943 – January 3, 1959	[data missing]
George E. Gorman	Democratic	3rd	March 4, 1913 – March 4, 1915	[data missing]
John J. Gorman	Republican	6th	March 4, 1921 – March 4, 1923	[data missing]
John J. Gorman	Republican	6th	March 4, 1925 – March 4, 1927	[data missing]
Martin Gorski	Democratic	4th	January 3, 1943 – January 3, 1949	Died
Martin Gorski	Democratic	5th	January 3, 1949 – December 4, 1949	Died
Joseph V. Graff	Republican	14th	March 4, 1895 – March 4, 1903	[data missing]
Joseph V. Graff	Republican	16th	March 4, 1903 – March 4, 1911	[data missing]
James M. Graham	Democratic	21st	March 4, 1909 – March 4, 1915	[data missing]
William J. Graham	Republican	14th	March 4, 1917 – June 7, 1924	Resigned to become presiding judge of the US Court of Appeals
Peter C. Granata	Republican	8th	March 4, 1931 – April 5, 1932	Lost contested election
Kenneth J. Gray	Democratic	25th	January 3, 1955 – January 3, 1963	[data missing]
Kenneth J. Gray	Democratic	21st	January 3, 1963 – January 3, 1973	[data missing]
Kenneth J. Gray	Democratic	24th	January 3, 1973 – December 31, 1974	Resigned
Kenneth J. Gray	Democratic	22nd	January 3, 1985 – January 3, 1989	[data missing]
John E. Grotberg	Republican	14th	January 3, 1985 – November 15, 1986	Died
Luis V. Gutierrez	Democratic	4th	January 3, 1993 – January 3, 2019	[data missing]
William F.L. Hadley	Republican	18th	December 2, 1895 – March 4, 1897	[data missing]
Homer W. Hall	Republican	17th	March 4, 1927 – March 4, 1933	[data missing]
Tim Lee Hall	Democratic	15th	January 3, 1975 – January 3, 1977	[data missing]
Debbie Halvorson	Democratic	11th	January 3, 2009 – January 3, 2011	[data missing]
Robert P. Hanrahan	Republican	3rd	January 3, 1973 – January 3, 1975	[data missing]
John J. Hardin	Whig	7th	March 4, 1843 – March 4, 1845	[data missing]
Abner C. Harding	Republican	4th	March 4, 1865 – March 4, 1869	[data missing]
Phil Hare	Democratic	17th	January 3, 2007 – January 3, 2011	[data missing]
Charles M. Harris	Democratic	4th	March 4, 1863 – March 4, 1865	[data missing]
Thomas L. Harris	Democratic	7th	March 4, 1849 – March 4, 1851	[data missing]
Thomas L. Harris	Democratic	6th	March 4, 1855 – November 24, 1858	Died
Carter Harrison Sr.	Democratic	2nd	March 4, 1875 – March 4, 1879	[data missing]
William Hartzell	Democratic	18th	March 4, 1875 – March 4, 1879	[data missing]
J. Dennis Hastert	Republican	14th	January 3, 1987 – November 26, 2007	Resigned
Robert M. A. Hawk	Republican	5th	March 4, 1879 – June 29, 1882	Died
John B. Hawley	Republican	4th	March 4, 1869 – March 4, 1873	[data missing]
John B. Hawley	Republican	6th	March 4, 1873 – March 4, 1875	[data missing]
John B. Hay	Republican	12th	March 4, 1869 – March 4, 1873	[data missing]
Charles Hayes	Democratic	1st	August 23, 1983 – January 3, 1993	Lost renomination to Bobby Rush
Philip C. Hayes	Republican	7th	March 4, 1877 – March 4, 1881	[data missing]
James V. Heidinger	Republican	24th	January 3, 1941 – March 22, 1945	Died
Thomas J. Henderson	Republican	6th	March 4, 1875 – March 4, 1883	[data missing]
Thomas J. Henderson	Republican	7th	March 4, 1883 – March 4, 1895	[data missing]
John Henry	Whig	7th	February 5, 1847 – March 4, 1847	[data missing]
Charles A. Hill	Republican	8th	March 4, 1889 – March 4, 1891	[data missing]
Robert P. Hill	Democratic	25th	March 4, 1913 – March 4, 1915	[data missing]
William H. Hinebaugh	Progressive	12th	March 4, 1913 – March 4, 1915	[data missing]
William H. Hinrichsen	Democratic	16th	March 4, 1897 – March 4, 1899	[data missing]
Robert R. Hitt	Republican	5th	November 7, 1882 – March 4, 1883	Died
Robert R. Hitt	Republican	6th	March 4, 1883 – March 4, 1895	Died
Robert R. Hitt	Republican	9th	March 4, 1895 – March 4, 1903	Died
Robert R. Hitt	Republican	13th	March 4, 1903 – September 20, 1906	Died
Charles D. Hodges	Democratic	6th	January 4, 1859 – March 4, 1859	[data missing]
Elmer J. Hoffman	Republican	14th	January 3, 1959 – January 3, 1965	[data missing]
Richard W. Hoffman	Republican	10th	January 3, 1949 – January 3, 1957	[data missing]
Joseph P. Hoge	Democratic	6th	March 4, 1843 – March 4, 1847	[data missing]
William P. Holaday	Republican	18th	March 4, 1923 – March 4, 1933	[data missing]
Albert J. Hopkins	Republican	5th	December 7, 1885 – March 4, 1895	[data missing]
Albert J. Hopkins	Republican	8th	March 4, 1895 – March 4, 1903	[data missing]
George Evan Howell	Republican	21st	January 3, 1941 – October 5, 1947	Resigned after becoming judge of the US Court of Claims
Stephen A. Hoxworth	Democratic	15th	March 4, 1913 – March 4, 1915	[data missing]
Winnifred Huck	Republican	At-large	November 7, 1922 – March 4, 1923	[data missing]
Morton D. Hull	Republican	2nd	April 23, 1923 – March 4, 1933	[data missing]
William E. Hull	Republican	16th	March 4, 1923 – March 4, 1933	[data missing]
Randy Hultgren	Republican	14th	January 3, 2011 – January 3, 2019	[data missing]
Andrew J. Hunter	Democratic	At-large	March 4, 1893 – March 4, 1895	[data missing]
Andrew J. Hunter	Democratic	19th	March 4, 1897 – March 4, 1899	[data missing]
Stephen A. Hurlbut	Republican	4th	March 4, 1873 – March 4, 1877	[data missing]
Henry J. Hyde	Republican	6th	January 3, 1975 – January 3, 2007	[data missing]
James T. Igoe	Democratic	6th	March 4, 1927 – March 4, 1933	[data missing]
Michael L. Igoe	Democratic	At-large	January 3, 1935 – June 2, 1935	Resigned to become U.S. Attorney
Ebon C. Ingersoll	Republican	5th	May 20, 1864 – March 4, 1871	[data missing]
Clifford C. Ireland	Republican	16th	March 4, 1917 – March 4, 1923	[data missing]
Edward M. Irwin	Republican	22nd	March 4, 1925 – March 4, 1931	[data missing]
Jesse Jackson, Jr.	Democratic	2nd	December 12, 1995 – November 21, 2012	Resigned
Jonathan Jackson	Democratic	1st	January 3, 2023 – present	Incumbent
Edward H. Jenison	Republican	18th	January 3, 1947 – January 3, 1949	[data missing]
Edward H. Jenison	Republican	23rd	January 3, 1949 – January 3, 1953	[data missing]
Thomas M. Jett	Democratic	18th	March 4, 1897 – March 4, 1903	[data missing]
Anton J. Johnson	Republican	14th	January 3, 1939 – January 3, 1949	[data missing]
Calvin D. Johnson	Republican	22nd	January 3, 1943 – January 3, 1945	[data missing]
Tim Johnson	Republican	15th	January 3, 2001 – January 3, 2013	[data missing]
William Richard Johnson	Republican	13th	March 4, 1925 – March 4, 1933	[data missing]
Edgar A. Jonas	Republican	12th	January 3, 1949 – January 3, 1955	[data missing]
Norman B. Judd	Republican	1st	March 4, 1867 – March 4, 1871	[data missing]
Niels Juul	Republican	7th	March 4, 1917 – March 4, 1921	[data missing]
Charles A. Karch	Democratic	22nd	March 4, 1931 – November 6, 1932	Died
Russell W. Keeney	Republican	14th	January 3, 1957 – January 11, 1958	Died
Kent E. Keller	Democratic	25th	March 4, 1931 – January 3, 1941	[data missing]
William Kellogg	Republican	4th	March 4, 1857 – March 4, 1863	[data missing]
Edward A. Kelly	Democratic	3rd	March 4, 1931 – January 3, 1943	[data missing]
Edward A. Kelly	Democratic	3rd	January 3, 1945 – January 3, 1947	[data missing]
Robin Kelly	Democratic	2nd	April 9, 2013 – present	Incumbent
Fred J. Kern	Democratic	21st	March 4, 1901 – March 4, 1903	[data missing]
Edward John King	Republican	15th	March 4, 1915 – February 17, 1929	Died
Adam Kinzinger	Republican	11th	January 3, 2011 – January 3, 2013	[data missing]
Adam Kinzinger	Republican	16th	January 3, 2013 – January 3, 2023	Retired.
Mark Kirk	Republican	10th	January 3, 2001 – November 29, 2010	Resigned after being elected to the U.S. Senate
John C. Kluczynski	Democratic	5th	January 3, 1951 – January 26, 1975	Died
Anthony L. Knapp	Democratic	6th	December 12, 1861 – March 4, 1863	[data missing]
Anthony L. Knapp	Democratic	10th	March 4, 1863 – March 4, 1865	[data missing]
Robert M. Knapp	Democratic	11th	March 4, 1873 – March 4, 1875	[data missing]
Robert M. Knapp	Democratic	11th	March 4, 1877 – March 4, 1879	[data missing]
Philip Knopf	Republican	7th	March 4, 1903 – March 4, 1909	[data missing]
James Knox	Whig	4th	March 4, 1853 – March 4, 1855	[data missing]
James Knox	Opposition	4th	March 4, 1855 – March 4, 1857	[data missing]
Leo Kocialkowski	Democratic	8th	March 4, 1933 – January 3, 1943	[data missing]
Raja Krishnamoorthi	Democratic	8th	January 3, 2017 – present	Incumbent
Stanley H. Kunz	Democratic	8th	March 4, 1921 – March 4, 1931	[data missing]
Stanley H. Kunz	Democratic	8th	April 5, 1932 – March 4, 1933	Won contested election
Andrew J. Kuykendall	Republican	13th	March 4, 1865 – March 4, 1867	[data missing]
Darin LaHood	Republican	18th	September 10, 2015 – January 3, 2023	Elected to finish Aaron Schock's term.
Darin LaHood	Republican	16th	January 3, 2023 – present	Incumbent.
Ray LaHood	Republican	18th	January 3, 1995 – January 3, 2009	[data missing]
Silas Z. Landes	Democratic	16th	March 4, 1885 – March 4, 1889	[data missing]
Edward Lane	Democratic	17th	March 4, 1887 – March 4, 1895	[data missing]
William Lathrop	Republican	4th	March 4, 1877 – March 4, 1879	[data missing]
Frank Lawler	Democratic	2nd	March 4, 1885 – March 4, 1891	[data missing]
John V. Le Moyne	Democratic	3rd	May 6, 1876 – March 4, 1877	Won contested election
John H. Lewis	Republican	9th	March 4, 1881 – March 4, 1883	[data missing]
Roland V. Libonati	Democratic	7th	December 31, 1957 – January 3, 1965	[data missing]
Abraham Lincoln	Whig	7th	March 4, 1847 – March 4, 1849	Retired to private sector.
Neil J. Linehan	Democratic	3rd	January 3, 1949 – January 3, 1951	[data missing]
William W. Link	Democratic	7th	January 3, 1945 – January 3, 1947	[data missing]
Bill Lipinski	Democratic	5th	January 3, 1983 – January 3, 1993	[data missing]
Bill Lipinski	Democratic	3rd	January 3, 1993 – January 3, 2005	[data missing]
Dan Lipinski	Democratic	3rd	January 3, 2005 – January 3, 2021	Lost renomination to Marie Newman
John A. Logan	Democratic	9th	March 4, 1859 – April 2, 1862	Resigned to accept commission as a brigadier general in the Union Army
John A. Logan	Republican	At-large	March 4, 1867 – March 3, 1871	Resigned to become a US Senator
Lewis M. Long	Democratic	At-large	January 3, 1937 – January 3, 1939	[data missing]
William Lorimer	Republican	2nd	March 4, 1895 – March 4, 1901	[data missing]
William Lorimer	Republican	6th	March 4, 1903 – June 17, 1909	Resigned after being elected to the US Senate
Owen Lovejoy	Republican	3rd	March 4, 1857 – March 4, 1863	[data missing]
Owen Lovejoy	Republican	5th	March 4, 1863 – March 25, 1864	Died
Frank O. Lowden	Republican	13th	November 6, 1906 – March 4, 1911	[data missing]
Scott W. Lucas	Democratic	20th	January 3, 1935 – January 3, 1939	[data missing]
Frederick Lundin	Republican	7th	March 4, 1909 – March 4, 1911	[data missing]
A. F. Maciejewski	Democratic	6th	January 3, 1939 – December 8, 1942	Resigned
Peter F. Mack Jr.	Democratic	21st	January 3, 1949 – January 3, 1963	[data missing]
Martin B. Madden	Republican	1st	March 4, 1905 – April 27, 1928	Died
Edward Rell Madigan	Republican	21st	January 3, 1973 – January 3, 1983	[data missing]
Edward Rell Madigan	Republican	15th	January 3, 1983 – March 8, 1991	Resigned to become U.S. Secretary of Agriculture
William F. Mahoney	Democratic	5th	March 4, 1901 – March 4, 1903	[data missing]
William F. Mahoney	Democratic	8th	March 4, 1903 – December 27, 1904	Died
J. Earl Major	Democratic	21st	March 4, 1923 – March 4, 1925	[data missing]
J. Earl Major	Democratic	21st	March 4, 1927 – March 4, 1929	[data missing]
J. Earl Major	Democratic	21st	March 4, 1931 – October 6, 1933	Resigned after becoming judge of the US District Court for the Southern District of Illinois
James R. Mann	Republican	1st	March 4, 1897 – March 4, 1903	[data missing]
James R. Mann	Republican	2nd	March 4, 1903 – November 30, 1922	Died
Donald A. Manzullo	Republican	16th	January 3, 1993 – January 3, 2013	[data missing]
Benjamin F. Marsh	Republican	10th	March 4, 1877 – March 4, 1883	[data missing]
Benjamin F. Marsh	Republican	11th	March 4, 1893 – March 4, 1895	[data missing]
Benjamin F. Marsh	Republican	15th	March 4, 1895 – March 4, 1901	[data missing]
Benjamin F. Marsh	Republican	14th	March 4, 1903 – June 2, 1905	Died
Samuel S. Marshall	Democratic	9th	March 4, 1855 – March 4, 1859	[data missing]
Samuel S. Marshall	Democratic	11th	March 4, 1865 – March 4, 1873	[data missing]
Samuel S. Marshall	Democratic	19th	March 4, 1873 – March 4, 1875	[data missing]
Charles Martin	Democratic	4th	March 4, 1917 – October 28, 1917	Died
James Stewart Martin	Republican	16th	March 4, 1873 – March 4, 1875	[data missing]
John C. Martin	Democratic	At-large	January 3, 1939 – January 3, 1941	[data missing]
Lynn Morley Martin	Republican	16th	January 3, 1981 – January 3, 1991	[data missing]
Harry H. Mason	Democratic	21st	January 3, 1935 – January 3, 1937	[data missing]
Noah M. Mason	Republican	12th	January 3, 1937 – January 3, 1949	[data missing]
Noah M. Mason	Republican	15th	January 3, 1949 – January 3, 1963	[data missing]
William E. Mason	Republican	3rd	March 4, 1887 – March 4, 1891	[data missing]
William E. Mason	Republican	At-large	March 4, 1917 – June 16, 1921	Died
William L. May	Democratic	3rd	December 1, 1834 – March 4, 1837	[data missing]
William L. May	Democratic	3rd	March 4, 1837 – March 4, 1839	[data missing]
James McAndrews	Democratic	4th	March 4, 1901 – March 4, 1903	[data missing]
James McAndrews	Democratic	5th	March 4, 1903 – March 4, 1905	[data missing]
James McAndrews	Democratic	6th	March 4, 1913 – March 4, 1921	[data missing]
James McAndrews	Democratic	9th	January 3, 1935 – January 3, 1941	[data missing]
John A. McClernand	Democratic	2nd	March 4, 1843 – March 4, 1851	[data missing]
John A. McClernand	Democratic	6th	November 8, 1859 – October 28, 1861	Resigned to accept commission as brigadier general of volunteers for service in the Civil War
Robert McClory	Republican	12th	January 3, 1963 – January 3, 1973	[data missing]
Robert McClory	Republican	13th	January 3, 1973 – January 3, 1983	[data missing]
Joseph M. McCormick	Republican	At-large	March 4, 1917 – March 4, 1919	[data missing]
Ruth H. McCormick	Republican	At-large	March 4, 1929 – March 4, 1931	[data missing]
John J. McDannold	Democratic	12th	March 4, 1893 – March 4, 1895	[data missing]
James T. McDermott	Democratic	4th	March 4, 1907 – July 21, 1914	Resigned
James T. McDermott	Democratic	4th	March 4, 1915 – March 4, 1917	Elected to fill his own seat
Lawrence E. McGann	Democratic	2nd	March 4, 1891 – March 4, 1895	[data missing]
Lawrence E. McGann	Democratic	3rd	March 4, 1895 – December 27, 1895	Lost contested election
Charles McGavin	Republican	8th	March 4, 1905 – March 4, 1909	[data missing]
John C. McKenzie	Republican	13th	March 4, 1911 – March 4, 1925	[data missing]
Raymond S. McKeough	Democratic	2nd	January 3, 1935 – January 3, 1943	[data missing]
William B. McKinley	Republican	19th	March 4, 1905 – March 4, 1913	[data missing]
William B. McKinley	Republican	19th	March 4, 1915 – March 4, 1921	[data missing]
James McKinney	Republican	14th	November 7, 1905 – March 4, 1913	[data missing]
John McLean	Democratic-Republican	At-large	December 3, 1818 – March 4, 1819	[data missing]
Robert T. McLoskey	Republican	19th	January 3, 1963 – January 3, 1965	[data missing]
Rolla C. McMillen	Republican	19th	June 13, 1944 – January 3, 1949	[data missing]
Rolla C. McMillen	Republican	22nd	January 3, 1949 – January 3, 1951	[data missing]
Thompson W. McNeely	Democratic	9th	March 4, 1869 – March 4, 1873	[data missing]
John McNulta	Republican	13th	March 4, 1873 – March 4, 1875	[data missing]
William E. McVey	Republican	4th	January 3, 1951 – August 10, 1958	Died
James A. Meeks	Democratic	18th	March 4, 1933 – January 3, 1939	[data missing]
Ralph Metcalfe	Democratic	1st	January 3, 1971 – October 10, 1978	Died
M. Alfred Michaelson	Republican	7th	March 4, 1921 – March 4, 1931	[data missing]
Anthony Michalek	Republican	5th	March 4, 1905 – March 4, 1907	[data missing]
Robert H. Michel	Republican	18th	January 3, 1957 – January 3, 1995	[data missing]
J. Ross Mickey	Democratic	15th	March 4, 1901 – March 4, 1903	[data missing]
Abner J. Mikva	Democratic	2nd	January 3, 1969 – January 3, 1973	[data missing]
Abner J. Mikva	Democratic	10th	January 3, 1975 – September 26, 1979	Resigned to become judge of U.S. Court of Appeals
Edward E. Miller	Republican	22nd	March 4, 1923 – March 4, 1925	[data missing]
Mary Miller	Republican	15th	January 3, 2021 – present	Incumbent
Daniel W. Mills	Republican	4th	March 4, 1897 – March 4, 1899	[data missing]
Arthur W. Mitchell	Democratic	1st	January 3, 1935 – January 3, 1943	[data missing]
Richard S. Molony	Democratic	4th	March 4, 1851 – March 4, 1853	[data missing]
Allen F. Moore	Republican	19th	March 4, 1921 – March 4, 1925	[data missing]
Jesse Hale Moore	Republican	7th	March 4, 1869 – March 4, 1873	[data missing]
Isaac N. Morris	Democratic	5th	March 4, 1857 – March 4, 1861	[data missing]
James L. D. Morrison	Democratic	8th	November 4, 1856 – March 4, 1857	[data missing]
William Ralls Morrison	Democratic	12th	March 4, 1863 – March 4, 1865	[data missing]
William Ralls Morrison	Democratic	17th	March 4, 1873 – March 4, 1883	[data missing]
William Ralls Morrison	Democratic	18th	March 4, 1883 – March 4, 1887	[data missing]
Samuel W. Moulton	Republican	At-large	March 4, 1865 – March 4, 1867	[data missing]
Samuel W. Moulton	Democratic	15th	March 4, 1881 – March 4, 1883	[data missing]
Samuel W. Moulton	Democratic	17th	March 4, 1883 – March 4, 1885	[data missing]
William J. Moxley	Republican	6th	November 23, 1909 – March 4, 1911	[data missing]
P. H. Moynihan	Republican	2nd	March 4, 1933 – January 3, 1935	[data missing]
Everett J. Murphy	Republican	21st	March 4, 1895 – March 4, 1897	[data missing]
Morgan F. Murphy	Democratic	3rd	January 3, 1971 – January 3, 1973	[data missing]
Morgan F. Murphy	Democratic	2nd	January 3, 1973 – January 3, 1981	[data missing]
William T. Murphy	Democratic	3rd	January 3, 1959 – January 3, 1971	[data missing]
James C. Murray	Democratic	3rd	January 3, 1955 – January 3, 1957	[data missing]
William H. Neece	Democratic	11th	March 4, 1883 – March 4, 1887	[data missing]
Walter Nesbit	Democratic	At-large	March 4, 1933 – January 3, 1935	[data missing]
Walter C. Newberry	Democratic	4th	March 4, 1891 – March 4, 1893	[data missing]
Marie Newman	Democratic	3rd	January 3, 2021 – January 3, 2023	Redistricted to the 6th district and lost renomination to Sean Casten
Edward T. Noonan	Democratic	5th	March 4, 1899 – March 4, 1901	[data missing]
Jesse O. Norton	Whig	3rd	March 4, 1853 – March 4, 1855	[data missing]
Jesse O. Norton	Opposition	3rd	March 4, 1855 – March 4, 1857	[data missing]
Jesse O. Norton	Republican	6th	March 4, 1863 – March 4, 1865	[data missing]
George M. O'Brien	Republican	17th	January 3, 1973 – January 3, 1983	Died
George M. O'Brien	Republican	4th	January 3, 1983 – July 17, 1986	Died
Thomas J. O'Brien	Democratic	6th	March 4, 1933 – January 3, 1939	[data missing]
Thomas J. O'Brien	Democratic	6th	January 3, 1943 – April 14, 1964	Died
Frank T. O'Hair	Democratic	18th	March 4, 1913 – March 4, 1915	[data missing]
Barratt O'Hara	Democratic	2nd	January 3, 1949 – January 3, 1951	[data missing]
Barratt O'Hara	Democratic	2nd	January 3, 1953 – January 3, 1969	[data missing]
Thomas L. Owens	Republican	7th	January 3, 1947 – June 7, 1948	Died
George A. Paddock	Republican	10th	January 3, 1941 – January 3, 1943	[data missing]
Claude V. Parsons	Democratic	24th	November 4, 1930 – January 3, 1941	[data missing]
Lewis E. Payson	Republican	8th	March 4, 1881 – March 4, 1883	[data missing]
Lewis E. Payson	Republican	9th	March 4, 1883 – March 4, 1891	[data missing]
David D. Phelps	Democratic	19th	January 3, 1999 – January 3, 2003	[data missing]
Ralph Plumb	Republican	8th	March 4, 1885 – March 4, 1889	[data missing]
Nathaniel Pope	Democratic-Republican	Territory	March 4, 1817 – November 30, 1818	[data missing]
John Edward Porter	Republican	10th	January 22, 1980 – January 3, 2001	[data missing]
Glenn Poshard	Democratic	22nd	January 3, 1989 – January 3, 1993	[data missing]
Glenn Poshard	Democratic	19th	January 3, 1993 – January 3, 1999	[data missing]
Philip S. Post	Republican	10th	March 4, 1887 – January 6, 1895	Died
Melvin Price	Democratic	22nd	January 3, 1945 – January 3, 1949	[data missing]
Melvin Price	Democratic	25th	January 3, 1949 – January 3, 1953	[data missing]
Melvin Price	Democratic	24th	January 3, 1953 – January 3, 1973	[data missing]
Melvin Price	Democratic	23rd	January 3, 1973 – January 3, 1983	[data missing]
Melvin Price	Democratic	21st	January 3, 1983 – April 22, 1988	Died
George W. Prince	Republican	10th	December 2, 1895 – March 4, 1903	[data missing]
George W. Prince	Republican	15th	March 4, 1903 – March 4, 1913	[data missing]
Roman C. Pucinski	Democratic	11th	January 3, 1959 – January 3, 1973	[data missing]
Mike Quigley	Democratic	5th	April 7, 2009 – present	Incumbent
Tom Railsback	Republican	19th	January 3, 1967 – January 3, 1983	[data missing]
Henry T. Rainey	Democratic	20th	March 4, 1903 – March 4, 1921	[data missing]
Henry T. Rainey	Democratic	20th	March 4, 1923 – August 19, 1934	Died
John W. Rainey	Democratic	4th	April 2, 1918 – May 4, 1923	Died
Frank M. Ramey	Republican	21st	March 4, 1929 – March 4, 1931	[data missing]
Delia Ramirez	Democratic	3rd	January 3, 2023 – present	Incumbent
Henry Riggs Rathbone	Republican	At-large	March 4, 1923 – July 15, 1928	Died
Green B. Raum	Republican	13th	March 4, 1867 – March 4, 1869	[data missing]
William H. Ray	Republican	10th	March 4, 1873 – March 4, 1875	[data missing]
Chauncey W. Reed	Republican	11th	January 3, 1935 – January 3, 1949	[data missing]
Chauncey W. Reed	Republican	14th	January 3, 1949 – February 9, 1956	Died
Walter Reeves	Republican	11th	March 4, 1895 – March 4, 1903	[data missing]
Charlotte T. Reid	Republican	15th	January 3, 1963 – October 7, 1971	Resigned to become member of the Federal Communications Commission
Frank R. Reid	Republican	11th	March 4, 1923 – January 3, 1935	[data missing]
Frederick Remann	Republican	18th	March 4, 1895 – July 14, 1895	Died
Alexander J. Resa	Democratic	9th	January 3, 1945 – January 3, 1947	[data missing]
John Reynolds	Jacksonian	1st	December 1, 1834 – March 4, 1837	[data missing]
John Reynolds	Democratic	1st	March 4, 1839 – March 4, 1843	[data missing]
Mel Reynolds	Democratic	2nd	January 3, 1993 – October 1, 1995	Resigned
Edward Y. Rice	Democratic	10th	March 4, 1871 – March 4, 1873	[data missing]
John Blake Rice	Republican	1st	March 4, 1873 – December 17, 1874	Died
William A. Richardson	Democratic	5th	December 6, 1847 – August 25, 1856	Resigned
William A. Richardson	Democratic	5th	March 4, 1861 – January 29, 1863	Resigned after being elected to the US Senate
James M. Riggs	Democratic	12th	March 4, 1883 – March 4, 1887	[data missing]
Hugh M. Rigney	Democratic	19th	January 3, 1937 – January 3, 1939	[data missing]
John I. Rinaker	Republican	16th	June 5, 1896 – March 4, 1897	Won contested election
Zeno J. Rives	Republican	21st	March 4, 1905 – March 4, 1907	[data missing]
James Carroll Robinson	Democratic	7th	March 4, 1859 – March 4, 1863	[data missing]
James Carroll Robinson	Democratic	11th	March 4, 1863 – March 4, 1865	[data missing]
James Carroll Robinson	Democratic	8th	March 4, 1871 – March 4, 1873	[data missing]
James Carroll Robinson	Democratic	12th	March 4, 1873 – March 4, 1875	[data missing]
William A. Rodenberg	Republican	21st	March 4, 1899 – March 4, 1901	[data missing]
William A. Rodenberg	Republican	22nd	March 4, 1903 – March 4, 1913	[data missing]
William A. Rodenberg	Republican	22nd	March 4, 1915 – March 4, 1923	[data missing]
Daniel J. Ronan	Democratic	6th	January 3, 1965 – August 13, 1969	Died
Peter Roskam	Republican	6th	January 3, 2007 – January 3, 2019	[data missing]
Lewis Winans Ross	Democratic	9th	March 4, 1863 – March 4, 1869	[data missing]
Dan Rostenkowski	Democratic	8th	January 3, 1959 – January 3, 1993	[data missing]
Dan Rostenkowski	Democratic	5th	January 3, 1993 – January 3, 1995	[data missing]
William A. Rowan	Democratic	2nd	January 3, 1943 – January 3, 1947	[data missing]
Jonathan H. Rowell	Republican	14th	March 4, 1883 – March 4, 1891	[data missing]
Donald Rumsfeld	Republican	13th	January 3, 1963 – May 25, 1969	Resigned to become Director of the Office of Economic Opportunity
Bobby Rush	Democratic	1st	January 3, 1993 – January 3, 2023	Retired.
Marty Russo	Democratic	3rd	January 3, 1975 – January 3, 1993	[data missing]
Adolph J. Sabath	Democratic	5th	March 4, 1907 – January 3, 1949	[data missing]
Adolph J. Sabath	Democratic	7th	January 3, 1949 – November 6, 1952	Died
George E. Sangmeister	Democratic	4th	January 3, 1989 – January 3, 1993	[data missing]
George E. Sangmeister	Democratic	11th	January 3, 1993 – January 3, 1995	[data missing]
Gus Savage	Democratic	2nd	January 3, 1981 – January 3, 1993	[data missing]
Edwin M. Schaefer	Democratic	22nd	March 4, 1933 – January 3, 1943	[data missing]
Janice D. Schakowsky	Democratic	9th	January 3, 1999 – present	Incumbent
Bobby Schilling	Republican	17th	January 3, 2011 – January 3, 2013	[data missing]
Gale Schisler	Democratic	19th	January 3, 1965 – January 3, 1967	[data missing]
Brad Schneider	Democratic	10th	January 3, 2013 – January 3, 2015	[data missing]
Brad Schneider	Democratic	10th	January 3, 2017 – present	Incumbent
Aaron Schock	Republican	18th	January 3, 2009 – March 31, 2015	[data missing]
Leonard W. Schuetz	Democratic	7th	March 4, 1931 – February 13, 1944	Died
Owen Scott	Democratic	14th	March 4, 1891 – March 4, 1893	[data missing]
Thomas J. Selby	Democratic	16th	March 4, 1901 – March 4, 1903	[data missing]
Aaron Shaw	Democratic	7th	March 4, 1857 – March 4, 1859	[data missing]
Aaron Shaw	Democratic	16th	March 4, 1883 – March 4, 1885	[data missing]
Guy L. Shaw	Republican	20th	March 4, 1921 – March 4, 1923	[data missing]
Timothy P. Sheehan	Republican	11th	January 3, 1951 – January 3, 1959	[data missing]
John C. Sherwin	Republican	4th	March 4, 1879 – March 4, 1883	[data missing]
John Shimkus	Republican	20th	January 3, 1997 – January 3, 2003	[data missing]
John Shimkus	Republican	19th	January 3, 2003 – January 3, 2013	[data missing]
John Shimkus	Republican	15th	January 3, 2013 – January 3, 2021	Retired
George E. Shipley	Democratic	23rd	January 3, 1959 – January 3, 1973	[data missing]
George E. Shipley	Democratic	22nd	January 3, 1973 – January 3, 1979	[data missing]
Paul Simon	Democratic	24th	January 3, 1975 – January 3, 1983	[data missing]
Paul Simon	Democratic	22nd	January 3, 1983 – January 3, 1985	[data missing]
Edna O. Simpson	Republican	20th	January 3, 1959 – January 3, 1961	[data missing]
James Simpson Jr.	Republican	10th	March 4, 1933 – January 3, 1935	[data missing]
Sid Simpson	Republican	20th	January 3, 1943 – October 26, 1958	Died
James W. Singleton	Democratic	11th	March 4, 1879 – March 4, 1883	[data missing]
Charles Slade	Jacksonian	1st	March 4, 1833 – July 26, 1834	Died
Dietrich C. Smith	Republican	13th	March 4, 1881 – March 4, 1883	[data missing]
Frank L. Smith	Republican	17th	March 4, 1919 – March 4, 1921	[data missing]
George W. Smith	Republican	20th	March 4, 1889 – March 4, 1895	[data missing]
George W. Smith	Republican	22nd	March 4, 1895 – March 4, 1903	[data missing]
George W. Smith	Republican	25th	March 4, 1903 – November 30, 1907	Died
Robert Smith	Democratic	1st	March 4, 1843 – March 4, 1847	[data missing]
Robert Smith	Independent Democratic	1st	March 4, 1847 – March 4, 1849	[data missing]
Robert Smith	Democratic	8th	March 4, 1857 – March 4, 1859	[data missing]
Thomas V. Smith	Democratic	At-large	January 3, 1939 – January 3, 1941	[data missing]
Henry Snapp	Republican	6th	December 4, 1871 – March 4, 1873	[data missing]
Howard M. Snapp	Republican	11th	March 4, 1903 – March 4, 1911	[data missing]
Herman W. Snow	Democratic	9th	March 4, 1891 – March 4, 1893	[data missing]
Adam W. Snyder	Democratic	1st	March 4, 1837 – March 4, 1839	[data missing]
Eric Sorensen	Democratic	17th	January 3, 2023 – present	Incumbent
William A.J. Sparks	Democratic	16th	March 4, 1875 – March 4, 1883	[data missing]
William L. Springer	Republican	22nd	January 3, 1951 – January 3, 1973	
William M. Springer	Democratic	12th	March 4, 1875 – March 4, 1883	[data missing]
William M. Springer	Democratic	13th	March 4, 1883 – March 4, 1895	[data missing]
Elliott W. Sproul	Republican	3rd	March 4, 1921 – March 4, 1931	[data missing]
Edmund J. Stack	Democratic	6th	March 4, 1911 – March 4, 1913	[data missing]
Benjamin Stephenson	Democratic-Republican	Territory	November 14, 1814 – March 4, 1817	[data missing]
John A. Sterling	Republican	17th	March 4, 1903 – March 4, 1913	[data missing]
John A. Sterling	Republican	17th	March 4, 1915 – October 17, 1918	Died
Bradford N. Stevens	Democratic	5th	March 4, 1871 – March 4, 1873	[data missing]
Adlai E. Stevenson I	Democratic	13th	March 4, 1875 – March 4, 1877	[data missing]
Adlai E. Stevenson I	Democratic	13th	March 4, 1879 – March 4, 1881	[data missing]
Lewis Steward	Democratic	8th	March 4, 1891 – March 4, 1893	[data missing]
Bennett M. Stewart	Democratic	1st	January 3, 1979 – January 3, 1981	Lost renomination to Harold Washington
Claude U. Stone	Democratic	16th	March 4, 1911 – March 4, 1917	[data missing]
William Stratton	Republican	At-large	January 3, 1941 – January 3, 1943	[data missing]
William Stratton	Republican	At-large	January 3, 1947 – January 3, 1949	[data missing]
Lawrence B. Stringer	Democratic	At-large	March 4, 1913 – March 4, 1915	[data missing]
John T. Stuart	Whig	3rd	March 4, 1839 – March 4, 1843	[data missing]
John T. Stuart	Democratic	8th	March 4, 1863 – March 4, 1865	[data missing]
Jessie Sumner	Republican	18th	January 3, 1939 – January 3, 1947)	[data missing]
Clyde H. Tavenner	Democratic	14th	March 4, 1913 – March 4, 1917	[data missing]
Abner Taylor	Republican	1st	March 4, 1889 – March 4, 1893	[data missing]
Napoleon B. Thistlewood	Republican	25th	February 15, 1908 – March 4, 1913	[data missing]
John R. Thomas	Republican	18th	March 4, 1879 – March 4, 1883	[data missing]
John R. Thomas	Republican	20th	March 4, 1883 – March 4, 1889	[data missing]
Chester Thompson	Democratic	14th	March 4, 1933 – January 3, 1939	[data missing]
Charles M. Thomson	Progressive	10th	March 4, 1913 – March 4, 1915	[data missing]
Anthony Thornton	Democratic	10th	March 4, 1865 – March 4, 1867	[data missing]
Thomas F. Tipton	Republican	13th	March 4, 1877 – March 4, 1879	[data missing]
Richard W. Townshend	Democratic	19th	March 4, 1877 – March 9, 1889	Died
Thomas J. Turner	Democratic	6th	March 4, 1847 – March 4, 1849	[data missing]
Robert J. Twyman	Republican	9th	January 3, 1947 – January 3, 1949	[data missing]
Lauren Underwood	Democratic	14th	January 3, 2019 – present	Incumbent
Richard B. Vail	Republican	2nd	January 3, 1947 – January 3, 1949	[data missing]
Richard B. Vail	Republican	2nd	January 3, 1951 – January 3, 1953	[data missing]
Harold H. Velde	Republican	18th	January 3, 1949 – January 3, 1957	[data missing]
Charles W. Vursell	Republican	23rd	January 3, 1943 – January 3, 1949	[data missing]
Charles W. Vursell	Republican	24th	January 3, 1949 – January 3, 1953	[data missing]
Charles W. Vursell	Republican	23rd	January 3, 1953 – January 3, 1959	[data missing]
Joe Walsh	Republican	8th	January 3, 2011 – January 3, 2013	[data missing]
James H. Ward	Democratic	3rd	March 4, 1885 – March 4, 1887	[data missing]
Jasper D. Ward	Republican	2nd	March 4, 1873 – March 4, 1875	[data missing]
Vespasian Warner	Republican	13th	March 4, 1895 – March 4, 1903	[data missing]
Vespasian Warner	Republican	19th	March 4, 1903 – March 4, 1905	[data missing]
Elihu B. Washburne	Whig	1st	March 4, 1853 – March 4, 1855	[data missing]
Elihu B. Washburne	Republican	1st	March 4, 1855 – March 4, 1863	[data missing]
Elihu B. Washburne	Republican	3rd	March 4, 1863 – March 6, 1869	Resigned to become United States Secretary of State
Harold Washington	Democratic	1st	January 3, 1981 – April 30, 1983	Resigned to become Mayor of Chicago
Jerry Weller	Republican	11th	January 3, 1995 – January 3, 2009	[data missing]
John Wentworth	Democratic	4th	March 4, 1843 – March 4, 1851	[data missing]
John Wentworth	Democratic	2nd	March 4, 1853 – March 4, 1855	[data missing]
John Wentworth	Republican	1st	March 4, 1865 – March 4, 1867	[data missing]
Charles S. Wharton	Republican	4th	March 4, 1905 – March 4, 1907	[data missing]
William H. Wheat	Republican	19th	January 3, 1939 – January 16, 1944	Died
Hamilton K. Wheeler	Republican	9th	March 4, 1893 – March 4, 1895	[data missing]
Loren E. Wheeler	Republican	21st	March 4, 1915 – March 4, 1923	[data missing]
Loren E. Wheeler	Republican	21st	March 4, 1925 – March 4, 1927	[data missing]
George E. White	Republican	5th	March 4, 1895 – March 4, 1899	[data missing]
Richard H. Whiting	Republican	9th	March 4, 1875 – March 4, 1877	[data missing]
Scott Wike	Democratic	11th	March 4, 1875 – March 4, 1877	[data missing]
Scott Wike	Democratic	12th	March 4, 1889 – March 4, 1893	[data missing]
James R. Williams	Democratic	19th	December 2, 1889 – March 4, 1895	[data missing]
James R. Williams	Democratic	20th	March 4, 1899 – March 4, 1903	[data missing]
James R. Williams	Democratic	24th	March 4, 1903 – March 4, 1905	[data missing]
Thomas Sutler Williams	Republican	24th	March 4, 1915 – November 11, 1929	Resigned to become a judge to the United States Court of Claims
William E. Williams	Democratic	16th	March 4, 1899 – March 4, 1901	[data missing]
William E. Williams	Democratic	At-large	March 4, 1913 – March 4, 1917	[data missing]
William Warfield Wilson	Republican	3rd	March 4, 1903 – March 4, 1913	[data missing]
William Warfield Wilson	Republican	3rd	March 4, 1915 – March 4, 1921	[data missing]
Benson Wood	Republican	19th	March 4, 1895 – March 4, 1897	[data missing]
Charles W. Woodman	Republican	4th	March 4, 1895 – March 4, 1897	[data missing]
James Hutchinson Woodworth	Republican	2nd	March 4, 1855 – March 4, 1857	[data missing]
Nicholas E. Worthington	Democratic	10th	March 4, 1883 – March 4, 1887	[data missing]
Richard Yates	Whig	7th	March 4, 1851 – March 4, 1853	[data missing]
Richard Yates	Whig	6th	March 4, 1853 – March 4, 1855	[data missing]
Richard Yates Jr.	Republican	At-large	March 4, 1919 – March 4, 1933	[data missing]
Sidney R. Yates	Democratic	9th	January 3, 1949 – January 3, 1963	[data missing]
Sidney R. Yates	Democratic	9th	January 3, 1965 – January 3, 1999	[data missing]
Samuel H. Young	Republican	10th	January 3, 1973 – January 3, 1975	[data missing]
Timothy R. Young	Democratic	3rd	March 4, 1849 – March 4, 1851	[data missing]

== See also ==
- Illinois's congressional delegations
- Illinois's congressional districts
- List of United States senators from Illinois
