= Illinois's congressional districts =

U.S. House districts in the state of Illinois

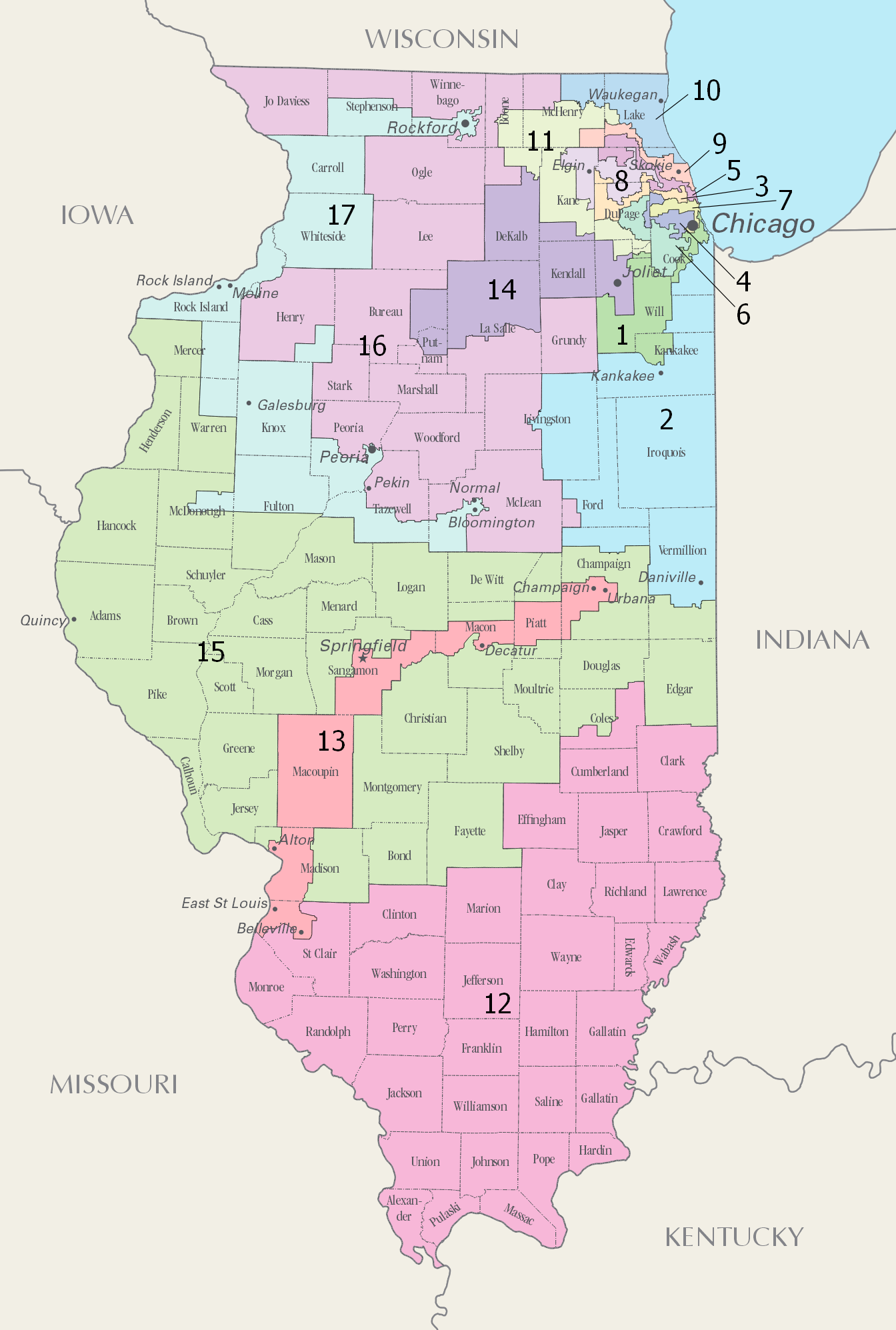
Map of Illinois's congressional districts since 2023 Interactive map version

Illinois is divided into 17 congressional districts, each represented by a member of the United States House of Representatives. The majority of Illinois's districts are located in the Chicago area.

The Illinois General Assembly has the primary responsibility of redrawing congressional district lines following each decennial census. The governor of Illinois has the power to veto proposed congressional district maps, but the General Assembly has the power to override that veto with the support of three-fifths of both chambers. In 1971, 1981, and 1991, the General Assembly was unable to come to an agreement, and the map was drawn up by a panel of three federal judges chosen by both Democrats and Republicans.

In 2001, the General Assembly was again unable to reach an agreement, and the task of redrawing district boundaries was given to the Illinois congressional delegation. With unified Democratic control of the General Assembly and governor's office during the 2011 and 2021 redistricting cycles, Democrats have been able to redistrict without input from Republicans, leading to districts gerrymandered to favor the Democratic Party that are among the most gerrymandered in the country.

In the 2022 midterm elections, per the 2020 United States census, Illinois lost a congressional seat. From a high of 27 congressional seats apportioned to Illinois following the 1910 and 1930 censuses, the state has lost one to two seats in every re-apportionment cycle since 1940, with the exception of the cycle following the 1970 census.

== Current districts and representatives ==
This is a list of United States representatives from Illinois, their terms, district maps, and the district political ratings according to the CPVI. The delegation in the 118th United States Congress has a total of 17 members, with 14 Democrats and 3 Republicans as of 2023.

Current U.S. representatives from Illinois
District	Member (Residence)	Party	Incumbent since	CPVI (2025)	District map
1st	Jonathan Jackson (Chicago)	Democratic	January 3, 2023	D+18	
2nd	Robin Kelly (Matteson)	Democratic	April 11, 2013	D+18	
3rd	Delia Ramirez (Chicago)	Democratic	January 3, 2023	D+17	
4th	Chuy García (Chicago)	Democratic	January 3, 2019	D+17	
5th	Mike Quigley (Chicago)	Democratic	April 7, 2009	D+19	
6th	Sean Casten (Downers Grove)	Democratic	January 3, 2019	D+3	
7th	Danny Davis (Chicago)	Democratic	January 3, 1997	D+34	
8th	Raja Krishnamoorthi (Schaumburg)	Democratic	January 3, 2017	D+5	
9th	Jan Schakowsky (Evanston)	Democratic	January 3, 1999	D+19	
10th	Brad Schneider (Highland Park)	Democratic	January 3, 2017	D+12	
11th	Bill Foster (Naperville)	Democratic	January 3, 2013	D+6	
12th	Mike Bost (Murphysboro)	Republican	January 3, 2015	R+22	
13th	Nikki Budzinski (Springfield)	Democratic	January 3, 2023	D+5	
14th	Lauren Underwood (Naperville)	Democratic	January 3, 2019	D+3	
15th	Mary Miller (Oakland)	Republican	January 3, 2021	R+20	
16th	Darin LaHood (Peoria)	Republican	September 10, 2015	R+11	
17th	Eric Sorensen (Moline)	Democratic	January 3, 2023	D+3	

== Historical and present district boundaries ==
Table of United States congressional district boundary maps in the State of Illinois, presented chronologically. All redistricting events that took place in Illinois from statehood in 1818 to 2013 are shown. During the periods of 1863-1873, 1893-1895, and 1903-1948, voters in Illinois elected an additional one to two at-large representatives.

Year	Statewide map	Chicago highlight
1818-1833	From 1818-1833 Illinois was represented by a single at-large member of Congress.	
1833-1843		
1843-1853		
1853-1863		
1863-1873		
1873-1883		
1883-1895		
1895-1903		
1903-1948		
1949-1952		
1953-1962		
1963-1966		
1967-1972		
1973–1982		
1983–1992		
1993–2002		
2003–2013		
2013–2023		

== Obsolete districts ==
- Illinois Territory's at-large congressional district
- Illinois's at-large congressional district
- Illinois's 18th congressional district
- Illinois's 19th congressional district
- Illinois's 20th congressional district
- Illinois's 21st congressional district
- Illinois's 22nd congressional district
- Illinois's 23rd congressional district
- Illinois's 24th congressional district
- Illinois's 25th congressional district
- Illinois's 26th congressional district

== See also ==
- Illinois's congressional delegations
- List of United States congressional districts
- Gerrymandering
