= George Washington Smith (politician) =

American politician

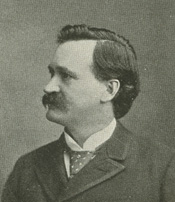

Member of the U.S. House of Representatives from Illinois
- In office March 4, 1889 – November 30, 1907
- Preceded by: John R. Thomas (20th); District established (22nd & 25th)
- Succeeded by: Orlando Burrell (20th); William A. Rodenberg (22nd); Napoleon B. Thistlewood (25th)
- Constituency: 20th district (1889-95); 22nd district (1895-1903); 25th district (1903-07)

Personal details
- Born: August 18, 1846 Putnam County, Ohio, U.S.
- Died: November 30, 1907 (aged 61) Murphysboro, Illinois, U.S.
- Education: McKendree College; Indiana University School of Law
- Occupation: Attorney

George Washington Smith (August 18, 1846 – November 30, 1907) was a U.S. representative from Illinois.

Born in Putnam County, Ohio, Smith moved with his father to Wayne County, Illinois, in 1850. Learned the blacksmith trade. He also attended the common schools. In 1868 he graduated from the literary department of McKendree College. After this he studied law in Fairfield, Illinois.

He then went to Indiana University where he received a law degree in 1870. He was admitted to the bar the same year and commenced practice in Murphysboro, Illinois. He served as master in chancery 1880–1888.

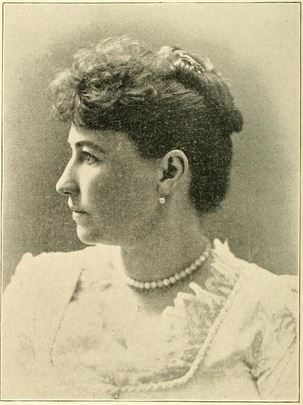
M. Alice Dailey

He married M. Alice Dailey. She was born at Murphysboro, Illinois, where she lived with her parents until her marriage with George W. Smith, then a brilliant young lawyer.

Smith was elected as a Republican to the Fifty-first and to the nine succeeding Congresses and served from March 4, 1889, until his death in Murphysboro, Illinois, November 30, 1907, before the convening of the Sixtieth Congress. He served as chairman of the Committee on Private Land Claims (Fifty-fourth through Fifty-ninth Congresses). He was interred in the City Cemetery.

== See also ==
- List of members of the United States Congress who died in office (1900–1949)

U.S. House of Representatives
Preceded by John R. Thomas	Member of the U.S. House of Representatives from Illinois's 20th congressional district 1889–1895	Succeeded by Orlando Burrell
Preceded by District created	Member of the U.S. House of Representatives from Illinois's 22nd congressional district 1895–1903	Succeeded by William A. Rodenberg
Preceded by District created	Member of the U.S. House of Representatives from Illinois's 25th congressional district 1903–1907	Succeeded by Napoleon B. Thistlewood
