= James M. Barnes (politician) =

American politician

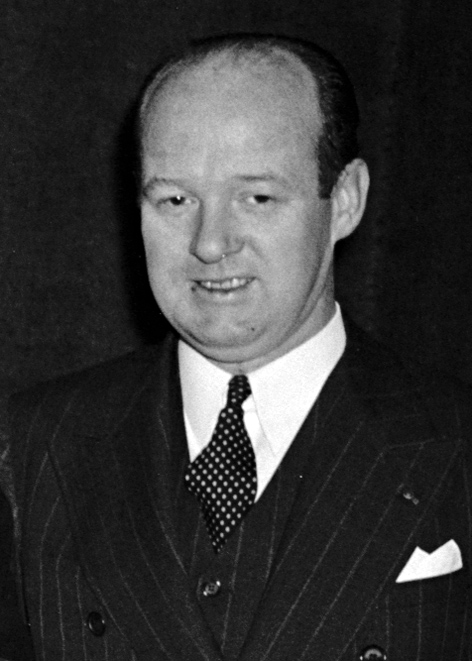

Member of the U.S. House of Representatives from Illinois's 20th district
- In office January 3, 1939 – January 3, 1943
- Preceded by: Scott W. Lucas
- Succeeded by: Sid Simpson

Personal details
- Born: January 9, 1899 Jacksonville, Illinois, US
- Died: June 8, 1958 (aged 59) Washington, D.C., US
- Party: Democratic

James Martin Barnes (January 9, 1899 – June 8, 1958) was a member of the U.S. House of Representatives from Illinois and administrative assistant to Presidents Franklin D. Roosevelt and Harry S. Truman.

== Early life ==
James Martin Barnes was born on January 9, 1899, in Jacksonville, Illinois. He attended the local schools and served in the United States Marine Corps during World War I.

== Career ==
Barnes graduated from Illinois College in 1921 and Harvard Law School in 1924. He was admitted to the bar in 1924 and practiced in Jacksonville. He was also active in business, and served on the boards of directors of the Ideal Baking Company, the Jacksonville Farm Supply Company and other companies.

A Democrat, he served as Morgan County Judge from 1926 to 1934, afterwards resuming the practice of law.

Barnes was elected to the Seventy-sixth and Seventy-seventh Congresses and served from January 3, 1939, to January 3, 1943. He was an unsuccessful candidate for reelection in 1942.

In March 1943, Barnes was appointed as administrative assistant to President Roosevelt. He continued in the position under President Truman following Roosevelt's death, serving from March 1, 1943, to July 15, 1945. In 1944 he was a delegate to the Democratic National Convention.

After leaving the White House Barnes practiced law in Washington, D.C.

== Death and burial ==
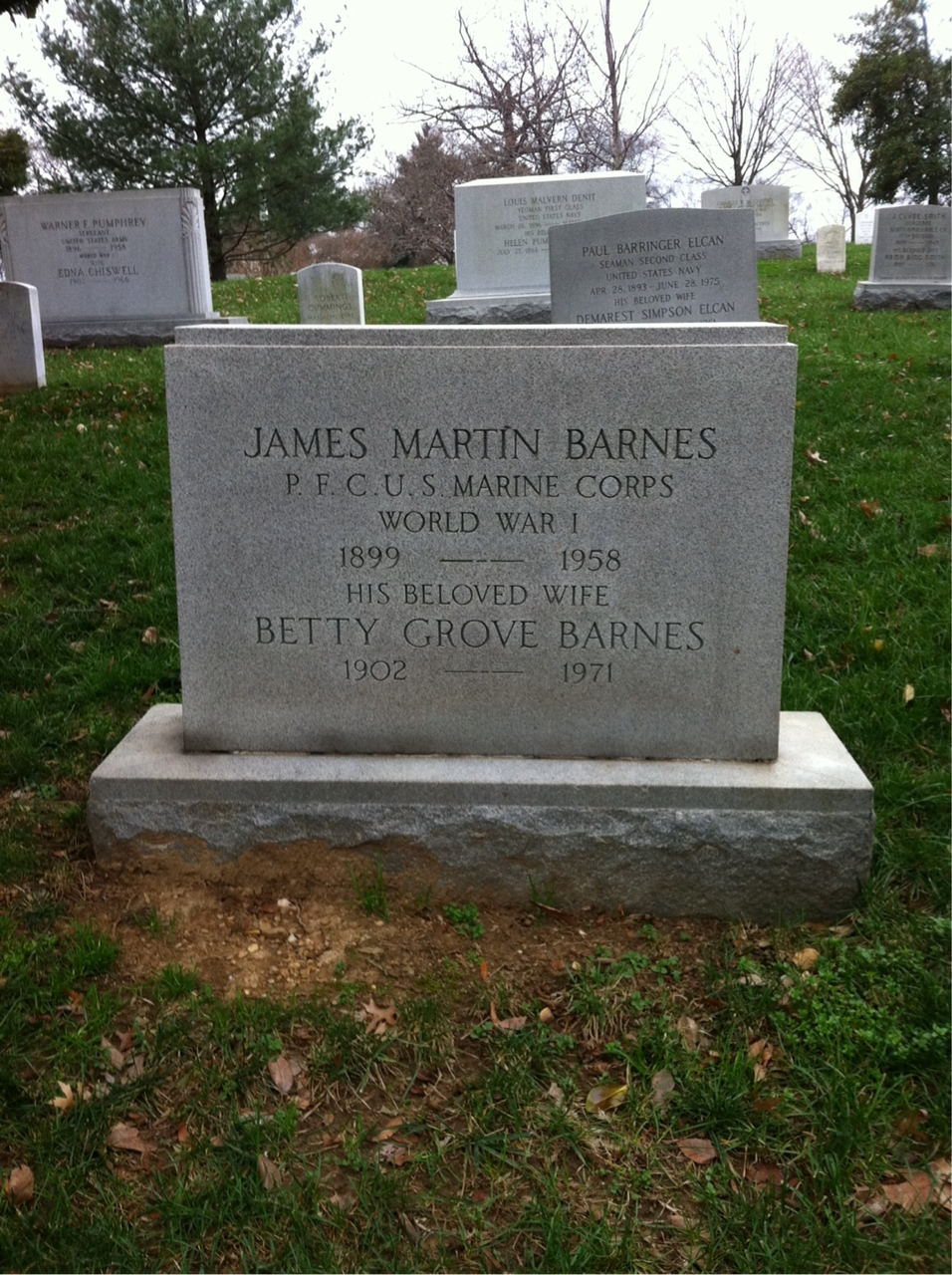
Grave at Arlington National Cemetery

Barnes died in Washington, D.C., on June 8, 1958. He was buried at Arlington National Cemetery, Section 13, Grave 14684–22–23. His gravesite is near the intersections of Farragut and Wilson Drives.

U.S. House of Representatives
Preceded by Scott W. Lucas	Member of the U.S. House of Representatives from Illinois's 20th congressional district 1939–1943	Succeeded by Sid Simpson
