= Edna O. Simpson =

American politician (1891–1984)

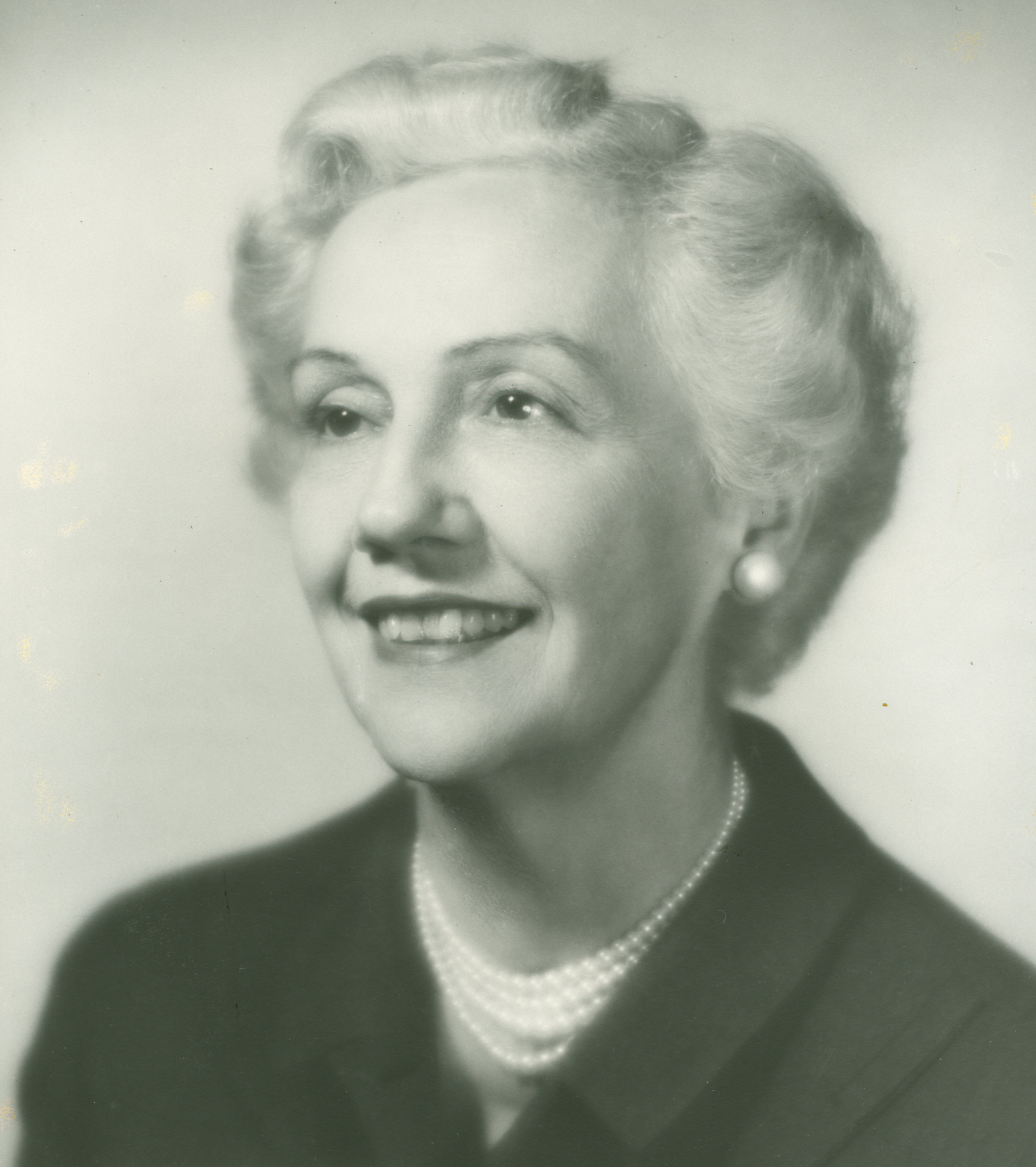

Member of the U.S. House of Representatives from Illinois's 20th district
- In office January 3, 1959 – January 3, 1961
- Preceded by: Sid Simpson
- Succeeded by: Paul Findley

Personal details
- Born: October 26, 1891 Carrollton, Illinois, U.S.
- Died: May 15, 1984 (aged 92) Alton, Illinois, U.S.
- Party: Republican
- Spouse: Sid Simpson

Edna Oakes Simpson (October 26, 1891 – May 15, 1984) was a U.S. representative from Illinois, wife of Sidney E. Simpson.

Born in Carrollton, Illinois, Edna Simpson was elected as a Republican to the Eighty-sixth Congress (January 3, 1959 – January 3, 1961). Simpson voted in favor of the Civil Rights Act of 1960. She did not seek renomination in 1960. She was a resident of Carrollton, Illinois, until her death in Alton, Illinois, on May 15, 1984.

== See also ==
- Women in the United States House of Representatives

U.S. House of Representatives
Preceded by Sid Simpson	Member of the U.S. House of Representatives from Illinois's 20th congressional district 1959–1961	Succeeded by Paul Findley
