= Kenneth J. Gray =

American businessman and politician (1924–2014)

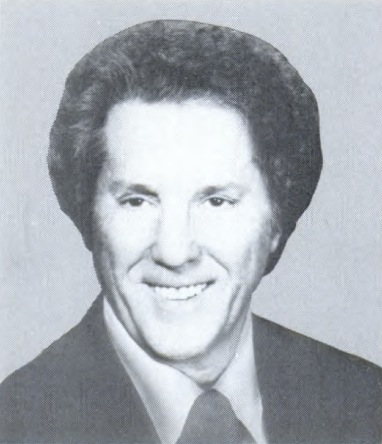
- Gray in 1987

Member of the U.S. House of Representatives from Illinois
- In office January 3, 1985 – January 3, 1989
- Preceded by: Paul Simon
- Succeeded by: Glenn Poshard
- Constituency: 22nd District (1985-1989)
- In office January 3, 1955 – December 31, 1974
- Preceded by: C. W. Bishop
- Succeeded by: Paul Simon
- Constituency: 25th District (1955–1963); 21st District (1963–1973); 24th District (1973–1974)

Personal details
- Born: November 14, 1924 West Frankfort, Illinois, U.S.
- Died: July 12, 2014 (aged 89) Herrin, Illinois, U.S.
- Party: Democratic
- Spouse(s): Gwendolyn June Croslin (1927–1995); Margaret "Toedy" Holley-Gray
- Children: 3

Kenneth James Gray (November 14, 1924 – July 12, 2014) was an American businessman and politician. He was a veteran of World War II, and represented Illinois in the United States House of Representatives from 1955 to 1974, and again from 1985 to 1989.

== Early life and education ==
Born in West Frankfort, Illinois, Gray attended the West Frankfort and Pope County elementary schools and graduated from Frankfort Community High School. At age 13 Gray started a business, Gray's Roller Rink at which he performed almost every job alone, from floor manager to concession stand cashier to janitor. At age 16, he became an auctioneer, and at age 18 he became the owner of the Gray Motors car dealership, which he operated until 1954.

== World War II ==
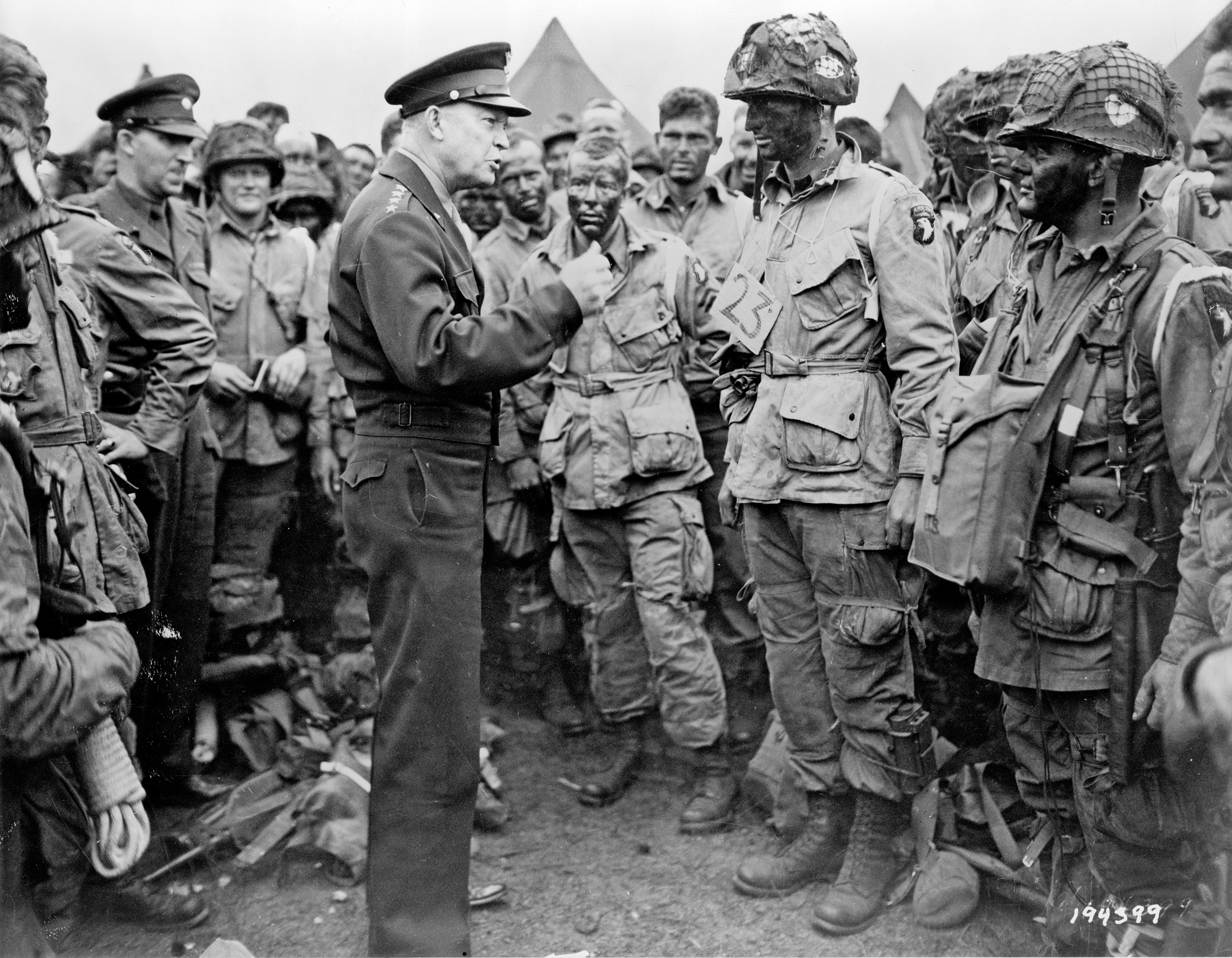
General Eisenhower addresses soldiers preparing for D-Day assault. According to Gray's biographers, he is the soldier in visored cap (not helmet) at far left.

In January, 1943 Gray enlisted in the Army Air Forces for World War II. He served with the Twelfth Air Force in North Africa, with the combat engineers of the Fifth Army in Italy, and again with the Twelfth Air Force in Southern France and elsewhere in Europe. Gray was an aircraft crew chief and attained the rank of first sergeant before being discharged in December 1945.

According to the authors of Pass the Plate, a 2009 biography of Gray, he was at the Greenham Common air base in June, 1944 and was assigned as Dwight D. Eisenhower's driver when Eisenhower met with Company E, 502nd Infantry Regiment shortly before the unit boarded planes and departed for the assault on Normandy. The authors also indicate that Gray can be seen in the well-known photo of Eisenhower speaking with soldiers including First Lieutenant Wallace C. Strobel.

Gray's awards included the European-African-Middle Eastern Campaign Medal and World War II Victory Medal.

== Post-World War II ==
After the war Gray was active in the American Legion, and was commander of the Southern Illinois region. In addition he served as Vice President of the Illinois Jaycees, and he credited these experiences with giving him the contacts and name recognition to mount a race for Congress.

Gray also completed training as an airplane and helicopter pilot and operated an air service at Benton, Illinois from 1948 to 1952.

In 1950 Gray campaigned for a seat in the U.S. House. He lost the Democratic nomination to Kent E. Keller, who lost the general election to incumbent C. W. Bishop. Gray opted not to run again in 1952.

In 1953 Gray was one of the founders of the Walking Dog Foundation for the Blind, a charitable organization to provide guide dogs to individuals who are blind or visually impaired.

== Congress ==
Gray was the successful Democratic nominee against Bishop in 1954 and won election to the 84th Congress. He was reelected nine times, and served from January 3, 1955, until his resignation on December 31, 1974. In Congress, Gray eventually decided to stand out from his peers by adopting out of the ordinary clothing and hairstyles, and became known for his flamboyant appearance, including permed hair dyed bright blonde or red, and unusual attire, such as white sport coats and shoes, bright suits, and wide, colorful patterned bow ties. In a deadpan joke frequently repeated by Glenn Poshard, when Poshard met Jim Wright in 1989 and introduced himself as Gray's successor, Speaker Wright joked about Gray's appearance by looking the conservatively dressed Poshard up and down and saying "I didn't know you could buy a pinstriped suit in southern Illinois."

Gray was known as the primary backer of converting Washington, D.C.'s Union Station into the National Visitor Center for the United States Bicentennial. The center was open in time for the 1976 Bicentennial celebrations, but was plagued with poor design and workmanship, and cost overruns. It was closed again after the Bicentennial, and in the late 1980s it was redeveloped again to serve as a train station and retail center.

He was also well known as an advocate of federal spending for his district, and used his post as a senior member of the Public Works Committee to obtain approval of projects including interstate highways, dams, housing, and the Marion Penitentiary. Dubbed the "Prince of Pork" for his securing of over $7 billion for projects in his area, Gray countered by pointing out that the Army Corps of Engineers estimated that the dam that created Rend Lake saved hundreds of millions of dollars in property losses by limiting damage during floods of the Big Muddy River, saying "If that is pork, pass me the plate, because I'll take another heaping serving."

Gray was an amateur magician and performed for civic groups and youth organizations in his district. In a 1956 House speech on the creation of the proposed Interstate Highway System, Gray carried a bouquet of red roses to the lectern to illustrate the "rosy" prospects for the road network as originally conceived. As he described the lobbyists and special interests who were "killing" the program piecemeal, Gray dramatized the point by snapping flowers off each stem of the bouquet until all the blossoms were gone. Then, as Gray reached the conclusion of his speech—that the lobbyists were going to fail and that the prospects for the Interstate Highway bill looked "rosy" again—white roses bloomed from the bare stems, and Gray earned an ovation from his colleagues. Another example of Gray's abilities came during a private show, when Senator Estes Kefauver and he successfully performed the body levitation trick using Senator J. Allen Frear Jr. as the subject. In 1959, Gray appeared on the TV game show To Tell the Truth. Two panelists -- Polly Bergen and Tom Poston—correctly guessed that Gray was a member of Congress, auctioneer, and magician, but the other two panelists -- Ralph Bellamy and Monique van Vooren—did not. In 1966, Gray appeared as a guest challenger on the TV game show I've Got a Secret. Introduced as a magician and pilot, he successfully stumped the panel, which did not guess that he was a member of Congress.

Gray resided on a houseboat while serving in Congress. In the mid-1970s there were several media accounts indicating that he had employed Elizabeth Ray and was involved in a lifestyle of wild parties and sex involving members of Congress and Congressional staff members. Gray denied wrongdoing, but was not a candidate for reelection in 1974 to the 94th Congress. He was succeeded by Paul Simon. After leaving Congress, Gray was active in several business ventures, including Ken Gray's Antique Car Museum.

== Return to Congress ==
In 1984 Simon ran for the United States Senate. Gray ran again for the U.S. House and was elected to the 99th and 100th Congresses (January 3, 1985 – January 3, 1989). As with the later years of his first tenure, during his return to Congress Gray was commended for using his knowledge of parliamentary procedure and House rules, along with the public speaking and gavel-wielding skills he had developed as an auctioneer to frequently preside over the House, and members of both parties praised him for his tact and fairness.

Gray indicated that he was not running for reelection in 1988 because of a muscular disorder caused by a tick bite that happened while Gray was on a congressional visit to Brazil.

== Retirement and death ==
In retirement, Gray was a resident of West Frankfort, and he opened a museum to showcase his political memorabilia and other mementos and souvenirs. In 1999, he suffered a stroke that left his speech slurred and his right side paralyzed.

He died on July 12, 2014, in Herrin, Illinois, at the age of 89. He was buried at East Fork Cemetery in West Frankfort.

== Family ==
During World War II Gray married Gwendolyn June Croslin. They were the parents of three children, Diann, Becky, and James; Gray's son James predeceased him. Gwendolyn Gray died in 1995; Gray's second wife was the Reverend Margaret "Toedy" Holley-Gray, who survived him.

== Legacy ==
The United States court house and post office in Benton, Illinois is the Kenneth Gray Federal Building.

In 2008, the post office in West Frankfort was named for him.

Also in 2008, Governor Rod Blagojevich designated Interstate 57 between Mile Post 0 at the Illinois State Line and Mile Post 106 at the Marion/Jefferson County Line as the "Ken Gray Expressway."

The Ken Gray Scholarship was created at John A. Logan College (JALC) in 2008. The scholarship is awarded to JALC students from Franklin County who are in their second year and plan to attend Southern Illinois University.

Gray was the subject of a biography, 2009's Pass the Plate: The Legend & Legacy of United States Congressman Kenneth J. Gray, by Maxine Pyle and Marleis Trover.

In 2016 Gray's wife closed the Ken Gray Museum and donated Gray's collection of memorabilia and other items to Morthland College. The college closed in 2018, and as of September 2018 the whereabouts of the collection is unknown. The college's attorney indicated in news accounts that the building the collection was housed in was robbed and an FBI investigation was opened.

U.S. House of Representatives
Preceded by C. W. Bishop	U.S. Representative of Illinois' 25th congressional district 1955–1963	Succeeded by District eliminated
Preceded by Peter F. Mack Jr.	U.S. Representative of Illinois' 21st congressional district 1963–1973	Succeeded by Ed Madigan
Preceded by Melvin Price	U.S. Representative of Illinois' 24th congressional district 1973–1974	Succeeded by Paul Simon
Preceded by Paul Simon	U.S. Representative of Illinois' 22nd congressional district 1985–1989	Succeeded by Glenn Poshard
