= Edward E. Denison =

American politician

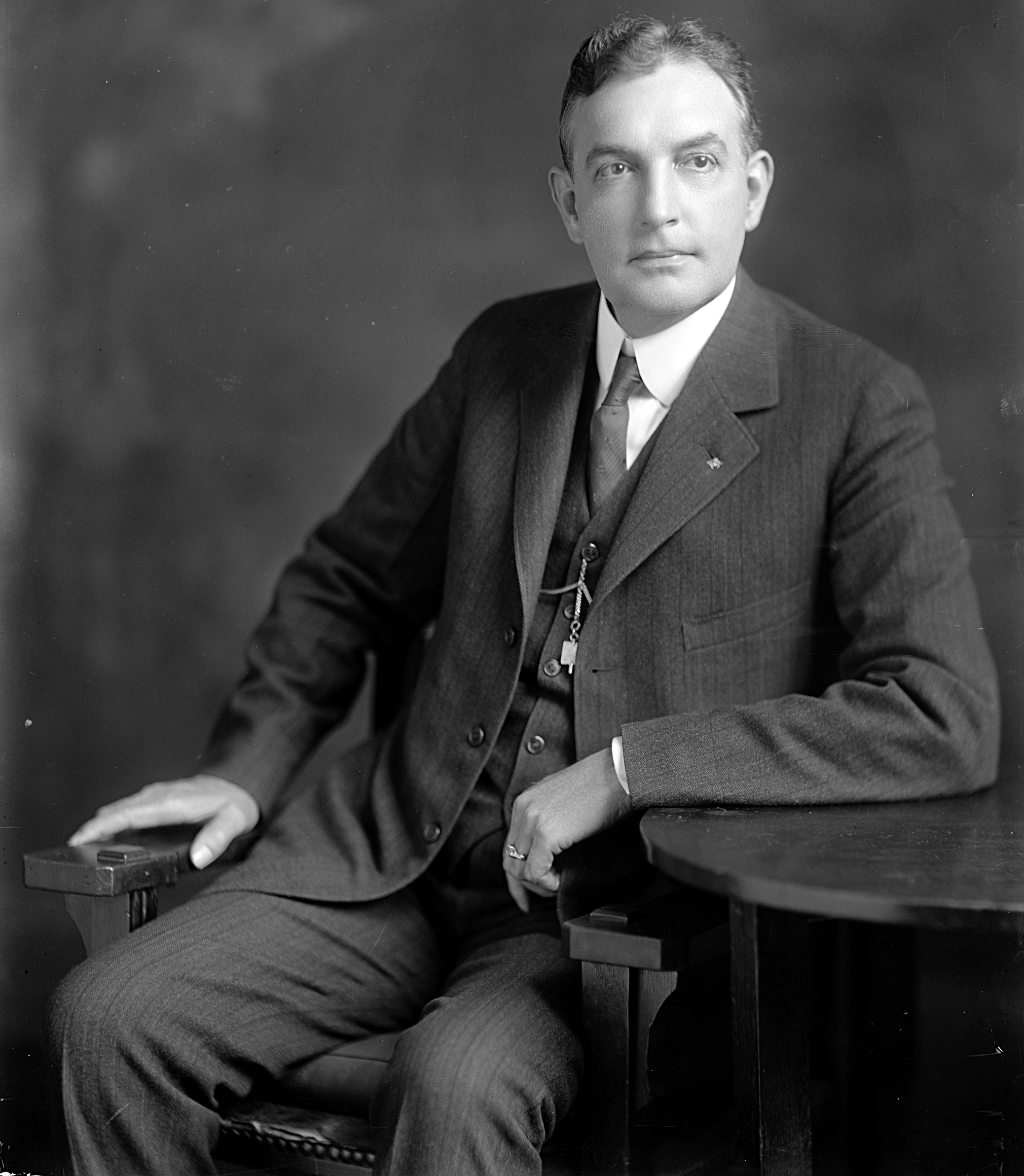

Member of the U.S. House of Representatives from Illinois's 25th district
- In office March 4, 1915 – March 3, 1931
- Preceded by: Robert P. Hill
- Succeeded by: Kent E. Keller

Personal details
- Born: August 28, 1873 Marion, Illinois, U.S.
- Died: June 17, 1953 (aged 79) Carbondale, Illinois, U.S.
- Party: Republican

Edward Everett Denison (August 28, 1873 – June 17, 1953) was a U.S. representative from Illinois.

== Early life ==
Born in Marion, Illinois, Denison attended the public schools. He was graduated from Baylor University, Waco, Texas, in 1895, from Yale University, in 1896, and from Columbian University (now George Washington University), Washington, D.C., in 1899. He was admitted to the bar in 1899 and commenced practice in Marion in 1900. He engaged in the banking business for one year.

== Career ==
Denison was elected as a Republican to the Sixty-fourth and to the seven succeeding Congresses (March 4, 1915 – March 3, 1931). He was an unsuccessful candidate for reelection in 1930 to the Seventy-second Congress and for election in 1932 to the Seventy-third Congress.

He resumed the general practice of law in Marion. He was an unsuccessful candidate for circuit judge of the first judicial circuit of Illinois in 1939.

== Death ==
He died in Carbondale, Illinois on June 17, 1953. He was interred in Maplewood Cemetery in Marion.

U.S. House of Representatives
Preceded by Robert P. Hill	Member of the U.S. House of Representatives from Illinois's 25th congressional district March 4, 1915 – March 3, 1931	Succeeded by Kent E. Keller
