= C. W. Bishop =

American politician

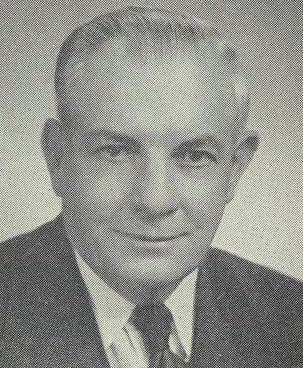
- Bishop in 1951

Member of the U.S. House of Representatives from Illinois
- In office January 3, 1941 – January 3, 1955
- Preceded by: Kent E. Keller
- Succeeded by: Kenneth J. Gray
- Constituency: 25th district (1941–1949); 26th district (1949–1953); 25th district (1953–1955)

Personal details
- Born: Cecil William Bishop; June 29, 1890 West Vienna, Illinois, U.S.
- Died: September 21, 1971 (aged 81) Marion, Illinois, U.S.
- Resting place: Oakwood Cemetery, Carterville, Illinois
- Party: Republican

Cecil William Bishop (June 29, 1890 – September 21, 1971) was an American politician who was a member of the United States House of Representatives from Illinois for seven terms, from 1941 to 1955.

== Biography ==
Bishop was born on a farm near West Vienna, Illinois. After attending the public schools and Union Academy in Anna, Illinois, he became a tailor. As quarterback on an elementary school football team he weighed less than 90 pounds, giving rise to the nickname "Runt."

Bishop was engaged in the cleaning and tailoring business from 1910 to 1922. He later worked as a coal miner, a telephone lineman, and a player for and manager of professional football and baseball teams. He became city clerk of Carterville, Illinois in 1915, and served until 1918. He was town postmaster from 1923 to 1933.

=== Congress ===
Bishop was elected as a Republican to the Seventy-seventh Congress and to six succeeding Congresses, serving from January 3, 1941, to January 3, 1955. He served as chairman of the Special Committee on Campaign Expenditures in the Eighty-third Congress. He ran unsuccessfully for reelection to the Eighty-fourth Congress in 1954, and was succeeded by Kenneth J. Gray.

=== Later career ===
After serving in Congress, Bishop held several other positions, including congressional liaison assistant, Post Office Department (1955-57, superintendent, Illinois State Division of Industrial Planning and Development (1957-58), and Department of Labor conciliator for the State of Illinois (1958-60).

=== Death and burial ===
Bishop died in Marion, Illinois on September 21, 1971. He was interred in Oakwood Cemetery in Carterville.

U.S. House of Representatives
Preceded by Kent E. Keller	Illinois's 25th congressional district 1941–1949	Succeeded by Melvin Price
Preceded by District created	Illinois's 26th congressional district 1949–1953	Succeeded by District abolished
Preceded by Melvin Price	Illinois's 25th congressional district 1953–1955	Succeeded by Kenneth J. Gray
