= Sid Simpson =

American politician (1894–1958)

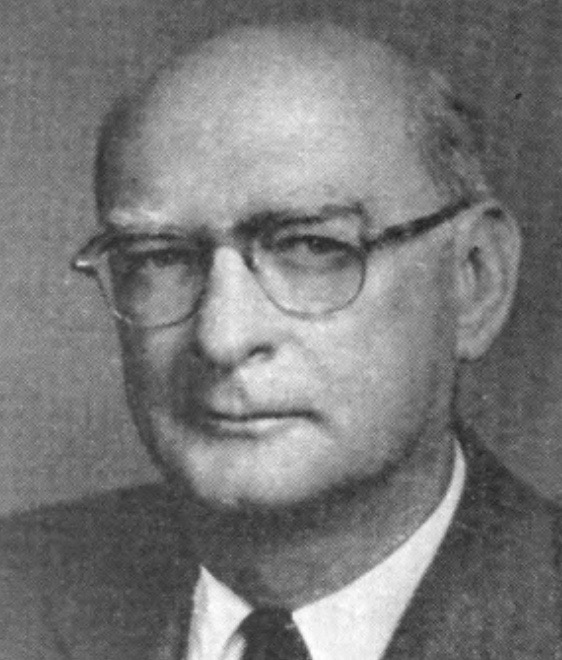

Member of the U.S. House of Representatives from Illinois's 20th district
- In office January 3, 1943 – October 26, 1958
- Preceded by: James M. Barnes
- Succeeded by: Edna O. Simpson

Personal details
- Born: Sidney Elmer Simpson; September 20, 1894 Carrollton, Illinois, U.S.
- Died: October 26, 1958 (aged 64) Pittsfield, Illinois, U.S.
- Party: Republican
- Spouse: Edna O. Simpson

Sidney Elmer Simpson (September 20, 1894 – October 26, 1958) was an American politician who served as a U.S. representative from Illinois from 1943 to 1958. He was a member of the Republican Party.

Born in Carrollton, Illinois, Simpson attended the public schools and graduated from Carrollton High School. During the First World War he served in the United States Army, with overseas service. He was owner of Simpson Motor Co. and Simpson Bus Co. He served as chairman of the Greene County Republican Committee. Simpson also served as member of the executive committee of the County Chairman's Association of Illinois, and as city treasurer of Carrollton for one term. He also served as a member of the Carrollton Board of Education.

Simpson was elected as a Republican to the Seventy-eighth and to the seven succeeding Congresses and served from January 3, 1943, until his death. He served as chairman of the Committee on the District of Columbia (Eighty-third Congress). Simpson voted present on the Civil Rights Act of 1957. Simpson had been renominated to the Eighty-sixth Congress. He died of a heart attack in Pittsfield, Illinois on October 26, 1958. He was succeeded in Congress by his wife Edna O. Simpson.

He was interred in Carrollton City Cemetery in Carrollton, Illinois.

== See also ==
- List of members of the United States Congress who died in office (1950–1999)

U.S. House of Representatives
Preceded by James M. Barnes	Member of the U.S. House of Representatives from Illinois's 20th congressional district 1943-1958	Succeeded by Edna O. Simpson
