= Napoleon B. Thistlewood =

American politician

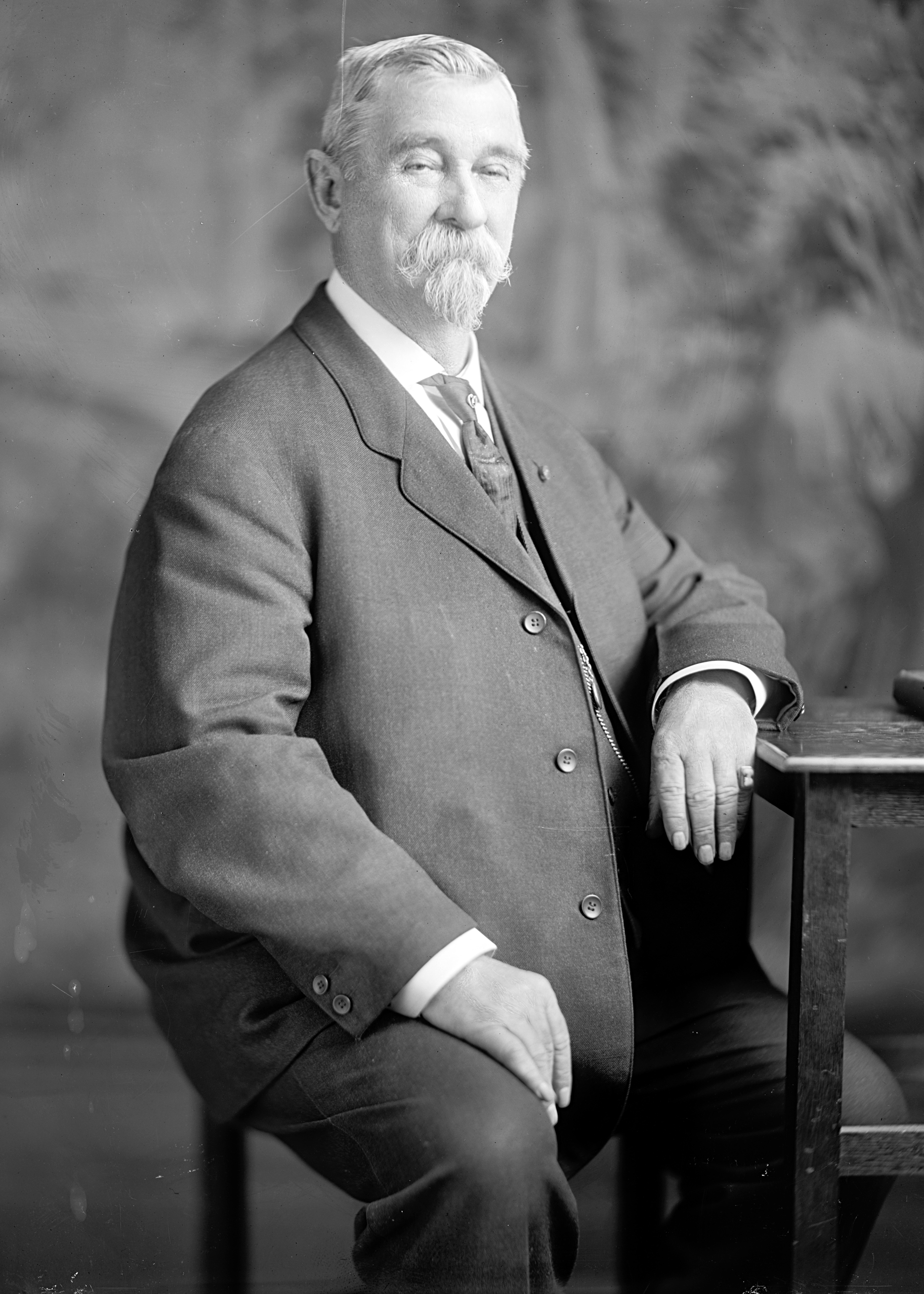

Member of the U.S. House of Representatives from Illinois's 25th district
- In office February 15, 1908 – March 3, 1913
- Preceded by: George Washington Smith
- Succeeded by: Robert P. Hill

Personal details
- Born: March 30, 1837 Kent County, Delaware, U.S.
- Died: September 15, 1915 (aged 78) Cairo, Illinois, U.S.
- Party: Republican

Napoleon Bonaparte Thistlewood (March 30, 1837 – September 15, 1915) was a veteran of the American Civil War who served as a U.S. Representative from the state of Illinois from 1908 to 1913.

== Early life and career ==
Napoleon Thistlewood was born in Kent County, Delaware, near the town of Harrington. He attended the public schools in that area. In 1858 he moved to Mason, Illinois, and engaged in mercantile pursuits.

Thistlewood served in the Union Army during the American Civil War.

After the war he returned to Mason and resumed business pursuits. He later moved to Cairo, Illinois, where he served two terms as that city's mayor, 1879-1883 and 1897-1901.

== Military and government service ==
Thistlewood enlisted in the Union Army in 1862 and served as captain of Company C, Ninety-eighth Regiment, Illinois Volunteer Infantry. He served in the Army of the Cumberland, in Wilder's Brigade, and with Wilson's Cavalry Corps.

At the conclusion of his second mayoral term in Cairo, Thistlewood was named Department Commander of the Grand Army of the Republic for Illinois (1901).

== Congress ==
Thistlewood was elected as a Republican to the Sixtieth Congress to fill the vacancy caused by the 1907 death of George W. Smith. He was elected to the Sixty-first and Sixty-second Congresses and served from February 1908 to March 1913. He was an unsuccessful candidate for reelection in 1912 to the Sixty-third Congress.

In April 1909, Thistlewood made a lengthy speech in Congress about tariffs which no one could hear.

== Retirement and death. ==
He retired and was a resident of Cairo, Illinois, where he died on September 15, 1915. He was interred in Beech Grove Cemetery, Mounds, Illinois.

U.S. House of Representatives
Preceded by George W. Smith	Member of the U.S. House of Representatives from Illinois's 25th congressional district 1908–1913	Succeeded by Robert P. Hill
