= Orlando Burrell =

American politician

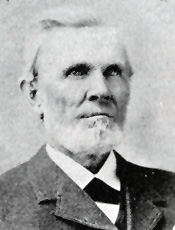

Member of the U.S. House of Representatives from Illinois's 20th district
- In office March 4, 1895 – March 3, 1897
- Preceded by: George W. Smith
- Succeeded by: James R. Campbell

Personal details
- Born: Orlando Burrell; July 26, 1826 Newton, Pennsylvania, U.S.
- Died: June 7, 1921 (aged 94) Carmi, Illinois, U.S.
- Resting place: Maple Ridge Cemetery
- Party: Republican

Orlando Burrell (July 26, 1826 – June 7, 1921) was an American Civil War veteran who served as a U.S. representative from Illinois for one term from 1895 to 1897.

== Life and career ==
Born in Newton, Pennsylvania, Burrell moved with his parents to White County, Illinois, in 1834. He attended the common schools. He engaged in agricultural pursuits.

=== Civil War ===
During the Civil War he raised a company of Cavalry in June 1861, and was elected its captain, and was attached to the First Regiment, Illinois Volunteer Cavalry.

=== After the war ===
He served as judge of White County 1873-1881. Sheriff of White County 1892-1894. He served as delegate to the Republican National Convention at Minneapolis in 1892.

=== Congress ===
Burrell was elected as a Republican to the Fifty-fourth Congress (March 4, 1895 – March 3, 1897). He was an unsuccessful candidate for reelection in 1896 to the Fifty-fifth Congress. He retired from public life and resumed his agricultural pursuits.

== Death ==
He died in Carmi, Illinois, June 7, 1921. He was interred in Maple Ridge Cemetery.

U.S. House of Representatives
Preceded by George W. Smith	Member of the U.S. House of Representatives from Illinois's 20th congressional district 1895–1897	Succeeded by James R. Campbell
