= Robert P. Hill =

American politician

Robert Potter Hill
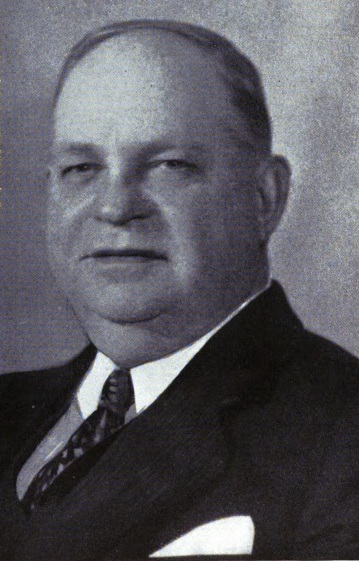
- Hill in 1937

Member of the U.S. House of Representatives
- In office January 3, 1937 – October 29, 1937
- Preceded by: Joshua B. Lee
- Succeeded by: Gomer Griffith Smith
- Constituency: Oklahoma 5th
- In office March 4, 1913 – March 3, 1915
- Preceded by: Napoleon B. Thistlewood
- Succeeded by: Edward E. Denison
- Constituency: Illinois 25th

Member of the Illinois House of Representatives from the 50th district
- In office January 4, 1911 – January 1913

Personal details
- Born: April 18, 1874 near Ewing, Illinois, U.S.
- Died: October 29, 1937 (aged 63) Oklahoma City, Oklahoma, U.S.
- Party: Democratic
- Spouse: Lora Corder Hill
- Children: Robert Potter Hill
- Education: Ewing College
- Profession: Attorney, politician, judge

Robert Potter Hill (April 18, 1874 – October 29, 1937) was an American politician and a U.S. representative from Illinois and from Oklahoma.

== Biography ==
Born near Ewing, Illinois, Hill was the son of James B. and Rebecca Spilman Hill, and attended the public schools. With a two-year interruption during which he taught school in Franklin County from 1891 to 1893; he graduated with a bachelor's degree from Ewing College in 1896. In 1899 he moved to Marion, Illinois, where he studied law and was a Justice of the Peace. A year later, he married Lora Corder. The Hills had one son, Robert Potter.

== Career ==
Hill was admitted to the bar in 1902 and commenced practice in Marion. He was Police magistrate of Marion in 1903 and City attorney of Marion from 1908 to 1910.

In the 1910 general election, Hill won one of the three seats in the Illinois House of Representatives from the 50th district. The 50th district included Franklin, Williamson, Union, Alexander, and Pulaski counties. Hill, a Democrat, was sworn into office on January 4, 1911, alongside Republicans R. D. Kirkpatrick and Hall Whiteaker.

In 1912, he was elected to Congress from Illinois to the 63rd United States Congress, Hill served from March 4, 1913, to March 3, 1915. An unsuccessful candidate for reelection in 1914 to the Sixty-fourth Congress, he resumed the practice of law.

Hill moved to Oklahoma City, Oklahoma, in 1918 and continued the practice of law. He was appointed assistant county attorney, Oklahoma County, in 1925 and served until 1929. He served as district judge of the thirteenth judicial district from 1931 until his resignation on December 15, 1936, having been elected to Congress.

Elected as a Democrat from Oklahoma to the Seventy-fifth Congress, he served from January 3, 1937, until his death.

== Death ==
Hill died in Oklahoma City, Oklahoma County, Oklahoma, on October 29, 1937 (age 63 years, 194 days). He is interred at Memorial Park Cemetery in Oklahoma City.

== See also ==
- List of members of the United States Congress who died in office (1900–1949)

U.S. House of Representatives
Preceded by Napoleon B. Thistlewood	Member of the U.S. House of Representatives from Illinois's 25th congressional district 1913-1915	Succeeded by Edward E. Denison
Preceded by Joshua B. Lee	Member of the U.S. House of Representatives from Oklahoma's 1st congressional district 1937	Succeeded by Gomer G. Smith
