= James R. Campbell (Illinois politician) =

American politician

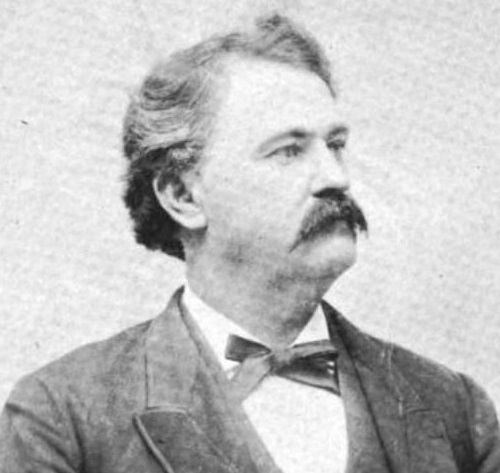
- From Volume I of 1899's Autobiographies and Portraits of the President, Cabinet, Supreme Court and Fifty-fifth Congress

Member of the U.S. House of Representatives from Illinois's 20th district
- In office March 4, 1897 – March 3, 1899
- Preceded by: Orlando Burrell
- Succeeded by: James R. Williams

Member of the Illinois Senate
- In office 1888-1896

Member of the Illinois House of Representatives
- In office 1884-1888

Personal details
- Born: May 4, 1853 McLeansboro, Illinois, U.S.
- Died: August 12, 1924 (aged 71) McLeansboro, Illinois, U.S.
- Party: Democratic

James Romulus Campbell (May 4, 1853 – August 12, 1924) was a U.S. representative from Illinois.

== Biography ==
Born near McLeansboro, Illinois, to John L. and Mary Ainsworth (Coker) Campbell, he attended the local public schools, and later, the University of Notre Dame, where he studied law. He was admitted to the bar in 1877 and commenced practice in McLeansboro. He owned and edited the McLeansboro Times from 1870-1898. He served as a member of the State House of Representatives from 1884-1888. He served in the State Senate from 1888-1896.

Campbell was elected as a Democrat to the 55th Congress (March 4, 1897 – March 3, 1899), but did not run for reelection to the 56th Congress, instead serving in the war with Spain in the Ninth Regiment, Illinois Volunteer Infantry as he was commissioned colonel June 28, 1898. After the muster out of that regiment, he was appointed lieutenant colonel of the Thirtieth Regiment, United States Volunteers, on July 5, 1899, and assigned to service in the Philippine Islands. Commissioned brigadier general of Volunteers January 3, 1901, and was honorably discharged March 25, 1901. He engaged in milling and banking in McLeansboro, Illinois, and died there on August 12, 1924. He was interred in Odd Fellows Cemetery.

Political offices
U.S. House of Representatives
Preceded by Orlando Burrell	United States Representative for the 20th congressional district of Illinois; 1897 – 1899	Succeeded by James R. Williams
