= Illinois's 26th congressional district =

Former U.S. House district in Illinois

- Obsolete district
- Created: 1949
- Eliminated: 1950
- Years active: 1949–1953

The 26th congressional district of Illinois was a congressional district for the United States House of Representatives in Illinois. The district was created in 1949 and was eliminated as a result of the 1950 census. Its only representative was C. W. Bishop who was redistricted from and into the 25th district.

== List of members representing the district ==
Member	Party	Years	Cong ress	Electoral history	District location
District established January 3, 1949
C. W. Bishop (Carterville)	Republican	January 3, 1949 – January 3, 1953	81st 82nd	Redistricted from the 25th district and re-elected in 1948. Re-elected in 1950. Redistricted to the 25th district.	1949–1953; Alexander, Franklin, Jackson, Monroe, Perry, Pulaski, Randolph, Union, and Williamson
District eliminated January 3, 1953

== Electoral history ==
=== 1948 ===
1948 United States House of Representatives general election
Party	Candidate	Votes	%
Republican	C. W. "Runt" Bishop	54,993	51.87
Democratic	Kent E. Keller	51,028	48.13
Write-in		1	0.00
Total votes		106,022	100.0

=== 1950 ===
1950 United States House of Representatives general election
Party	Candidate	Votes	%	±%
Republican	C. W. "Runt" Bishop (incumbent)	53,207	51.18	−0.69%
Democratic	Kent E. Keller	50,759	48.82	+0.69%
Total votes		103,966	100.0	
