= West Vienna, Illinois =

- Unincorporated community
- Location within Illinois Location within the United States
- Coordinates: 37°25′43″N 88°58′10″W
- Country: United States
- State: Illinois
- County: Johnson
- Elevation: 394 ft (120 m)
- Time zone: UTC-6 (Central (CST))
  - Summer (DST): UTC-5 (CDT)
- ZIP code: 62909
- Area code: 618
- GNIS feature ID: 420941

West Vienna, also known as Boles, is an unincorporated community in Johnson County, Illinois, United States. West Vienna is located at the junction of Illinois Route 37 and Illinois Route 146, west of Vienna. West Vienna has a post office with ZIP code 62909, though the post office uses the name Boles.
