= Illinois's 25th congressional district =

Former U.S. House district in Illinois

- Obsolete district
- Created: 1900
- Eliminated: 1960
- Years active: 1903-1963

The 25th congressional district of Illinois was a congressional district for the United States House of Representatives in Illinois. It was eliminated as a result of the 1960 census. It was last represented by Kenneth J. Gray who was redistricted into the 21st district.

== List of members representing the district ==
Member	Party	Years	Cong ress	Electoral history
District created March 4, 1903
George W. Smith (Murphysboro)	Republican	March 4, 1903 – November 30, 1907	58th 59th 60th	Redistricted from the 22nd district and re-elected in 1902. Re-elected in 1904. Re-elected in 1906. Died.
Vacant		November 30, 1907 – February 15, 1908	60th	
Napoleon B. Thistlewood (Cairo)	Republican	February 15, 1908 – March 3, 1913	60th 61st 62nd	Elected to finish Smith's term. Re-elected in 1908. Re-elected in 1910. Lost re-election.
Robert P. Hill (Marion)	Democratic	March 4, 1913 – March 3, 1915	63rd	Elected in 1912. Lost re-election.
Edward E. Denison (Marion)	Republican	March 4, 1915 – March 3, 1931	64th 65th 66th 67th 68th 69th 70th 71st	Elected in 1914. Re-elected in 1916. Re-elected in 1918. Re-elected in 1920. Re-elected in 1922. Re-elected in 1924. Re-elected in 1926. Re-elected in 1928. Lost re-election.
Kent E. Keller (Ava)	Democratic	March 4, 1931 – January 3, 1941	72nd 73rd 74th 75th 76th	Elected in 1930. Re-elected in 1932. Re-elected in 1934. Re-elected in 1936. Re-elected in 1938. Lost re-election.
C. W. Bishop (Carterville)	Republican	January 3, 1941 – January 3, 1949	77th 78th 79th 80th	Elected in 1940. Re-elected in 1942. Re-elected in 1944. Re-elected in 1946. Redistricted to the 26th district.
Melvin Price (East St. Louis)	Democratic	January 3, 1949 – January 3, 1953	81st 82nd	Redistricted from the 22nd district and re-elected in 1948. Re-elected in 1950. Redistricted to the 24th district.
C. W. Bishop (Carterville)	Republican	January 3, 1953 – January 3, 1955	83rd	Redistricted from the 26th district and re-elected in 1952. Lost re-election.
Kenneth J. Gray (West Frankfort)	Democratic	January 3, 1955 – January 3, 1963	84th 85th 86th 87th	Elected in 1954. Re-elected in 1956. Re-elected in 1958. Re-elected in 1960. Redistricted to the 21st district.
District eliminated January 3, 1963

== Electoral history ==
=== 1902 ===
1902 United States House of Representatives General Election
Party	Candidate	Votes	%
Republican	George W. Smith	18,743	51.86
Democratic	James Lingle	16,444	45.49
Prohibition	Clark Braden	958	2.65
Total votes		36,145	100.0

=== 1904 ===
1904 United States House of Representatives General Election
Party	Candidate	Votes	%	±%
Republican	George W. Smith (incumbent)	22,527	55.59	+3.73%
Democratic	Charles L. Otrich	14,668	36.20	−9.29%
Prohibition	Charles F. Kiest	2,306	5.69	+3.04%
Socialist	Daniel W. Boone	1,023	2.52	N/A
Total votes		40,524	100.0	

=== 1906 ===
1906 United States House of Representatives General Election
Party	Candidate	Votes	%	±%
Republican	George W. Smith (incumbent)	17,835	52.64	−2.95%
Democratic	James M. Joplin	14,240	42.03	+5.83%
Prohibition	Rebert H. Robertson	1,411	4.16	−1.53%
Socialist	C. E. Ingraham	394	1.16	−1.36%
Total votes		33,880	100.0	

=== 1908 (special) ===
1908 United States House of Representatives Special Election
Party	Candidate	Votes	%	±%
Republican	Napoleon B. Thistlewood	12,263	47.17	−5.47%
Democratic	William H. Warder	8,620	33.16	−8.87%
Independent Republican	Samuel T. Brush	3,987	15.34	N/A
Socialist	Daniel W. Boone	1,125	4.33	+3.17%
Total votes		25,995	100.0	

=== 1908 (regular) ===
1908 United States House of Representatives General Election
Party	Candidate	Votes	%	±%
Republican	Napoleon B. Thistlewood	12,263	47.17	−5.47%
Democratic	William H. Warder	8,620	33.16	−8.87%
Independent Republican	Samuel T. Brush	3,987	15.34	N/A
Socialist	Daniel W. Boone	1,125	4.33	+3.17%
Total votes		25,995	100.0	

=== 1910 ===
1910 United States House of Representatives General Election
Party	Candidate	Votes	%	±%
Republican	N. B. Thistlewood (incumbent)	18,233	49.06	−2.57%
Democratic	William D. Lyerle	16,442	44.24	+0.64%
Socialist	Daniel Boone	1,815	4.88	+2.78%
Prohibition	J. H. Davis	675	1.82	−0.86%
Total votes		37,165	100.0	

=== 1912 ===
1912 United States House of Representatives General Election
Party	Candidate	Votes	%	±%
Democratic	Robert P. Hill	19,992	43.31	−0.93%
Republican	Napoleon B. Thistlewood (incumbent)	16,706	36.19	−12.87%
Progressive	Robert T. Cook	6,545	14.18	N/A
Socialist	Paul H. Castle	2,063	4.47	−0.41%
Prohibition	Charles F. Stalker	859	1.86	+0.04%
Total votes		46,165	100.0	

=== 1914 ===
1914 United States House of Representatives General Election
Party	Candidate	Votes	%	±%
Republican	E. E. Denison	20,271	47.94	+11.75%
Democratic	Robert P. Hill (incumbent)	17,922	42.38	−0.93%
Progressive	George W. Dowell	2,468	5.84	−8.34%
Socialist	Paul H. Castle	1,176	2.78	−1.69%
Write-in		1	0.00	N/A
Total votes		42,288	100.0	

=== 1916 ===
1916 United States House of Representatives General Election
Party	Candidate	Votes	%	±%
Republican	Edward E. Denison (incumbent)	27,905	52.16	+4.22%
Democratic	Andrew J. Rendleman	24,034	44.93	+2.55%
Socialist	R. E. Baty	1,536	2.87	+0.09%
Write-in		23	0.04	+0.04%
Total votes		53,498	100.0	

=== 1918 ===
1918 United States House of Representatives General Election
Party	Candidate	Votes	%	±%
Republican	Edward E. Denison (incumbent)	22,886	60.41	+8.25%
Democratic	D. T. Woodard	15,000	39.59	−5.34%
Write-in		1	0.00	-0.04%
Total votes		37,887	100.0	

=== 1920 ===
1920 United States House of Representatives General Election
Party	Candidate	Votes	%	±%
Republican	Edward E. Denison (incumbent)	49,145	58.18	−2.23%
Democratic	J. Herman Clayton	28,444	33.67	−5.92%
Farmer–Labor	John H. Reed	5,690	6.74	N/A
Socialist	Daniel Weldy	1,198	1.42	N/A
Total votes		84,477	100.0	

=== 1922 ===
1922 United States House of Representatives General Election
Party	Candidate	Votes	%	±%
Republican	Edward E. Denison (incumbent)	37,907	54.37	−3.81%
Democratic	A. S. Caldwell	28,697	41.16	+7.49%
Farmer–Labor	James McCollum	1,943	2.79	−3.95%
Socialist	Norman M. Harris	1,170	1.68	+0.26%
Total votes		69,717	100.0	

=== 1924 ===
1924 United States House of Representatives General Election
Party	Candidate	Votes	%	±%
Republican	Edward E. Denison (incumbent)	47,080	58.11	+3.74%
Democratic	Philip N. Lewis	33,638	41.52	+0.36%
Socialist	David W. Kennedy	304	0.38	−1.30%
Total votes		81,022	100.0	

=== 1926 ===
1926 United States House of Representatives General Election
Party	Candidate	Votes	%	±%
Republican	Edward E. Denison (incumbent)	36,644	59.59	+1.48%
Democratic	A. F. Gourley	24,849	40.41	−1.11%
Total votes		61,493	100.0	

=== 1928 ===
1928 United States House of Representatives General Election
Party	Candidate	Votes	%	±%
Republican	Edward E. Denison (incumbent)	51,025	54.38	−5.21%
Democratic	A. F. Gourley	42,799	45.62	+5.21%
Total votes		93,824	100.0	

=== 1930 ===
1930 United States House of Representatives General Election
Party	Candidate	Votes	%	±%
Democratic	Kent E. Keller	38,796	52.62	+7.00%
Republican	Edward E. Denison (incumbent)	34,927	47.38	−7.00%
Total votes		73,723	100.0	

=== 1932 ===
1932 United States House of Representatives General Election
Party	Candidate	Votes	%	±%
Democratic	Kent E. Keller (incumbent)	64,286	59.60	+6.98%
Republican	Edward E. Denison	43,580	40.40	−6.98%
Total votes		107,866	100.0	

=== 1934 ===
1934 United States House of Representatives General Election
Party	Candidate	Votes	%	±%
Democratic	Kent E. Keller (incumbent)	55,824	54.84	−4.76%
Republican	J. Lester Buford	45,955	45.15	+4.75%
Write-in		15	0.01	N/A
Total votes		101,794	100.0	

=== 1936 ===
1936 United States House of Representatives General Election
Party	Candidate	Votes	%	±%
Democratic	Kent E. Keller (incumbent)	68,995	53.86	−0.98%
Republican	J. Lester Buford	59,101	46.14	+0.99%
Total votes		128,096	100.0	

=== 1938 ===
1938 United States House of Representatives General Election
Party	Candidate	Votes	%	±%
Democratic	Kent E. Keller (incumbent)	59,203	52.30	−1.56%
Republican	R. G. Crisenberry	53,999	47.70	+1.56%
Total votes		113,202	100.0	

=== 1940 ===
1940 United States House of Representatives General Election
Party	Candidate	Votes	%	±%
Republican	C. W. (Runt) Bishop	69,165	50.46	+2.76%
Democratic	Kent E. Keller (incumbent)	67,891	49.54	−2.76%
Total votes		137,056	100.0	

=== 1942 ===
1942 United States House of Representatives General Election
Party	Candidate	Votes	%	±%
Republican	C. W. (Runt) Bishop (incumbent)	49,965	55.07	+4.61%
Democratic	Kent E. Keller	40,762	44.93	−4.61%
Total votes		90,727	100.0	

=== 1944 ===
1944 United States House of Representatives General Election
Party	Candidate	Votes	%	±%
Republican	C. W. (Runt) Bishop (incumbent)	57,672	53.49	−1.58%
Democratic	Kent E. Keller	50,140	46.51	+1.58%
Total votes		107,812	100.0	

=== 1946 ===
1946 United States House of Representatives General Election
Party	Candidate	Votes	%	±%
Republican	C. W. (Runt) Bishop (incumbent)	53,831	59.78	+6.29%
Democratic	Sherman S. Carr	36,217	40.22	−6.29%
Total votes		90,048	100.0	

=== 1948 ===
1948 United States House of Representatives General Election
Party	Candidate	Votes	%	±%
Democratic	Melvin Price	101,927	69.50	+29.28%
Republican	Russell H. Classen	44,728	30.50	−29.28%
Total votes		146,655	100.0	

=== 1950 ===
1950 United States House of Representatives General Election
Party	Candidate	Votes	%	±%
Democratic	Melvin Price (incumbent)	78,812	64.86	−4.64%
Republican	Roger D. Jones	42,696	35.14	+4.64%
Total votes		121,508	100.0	

=== 1952 ===
1952 United States House of Representatives General Election
Party	Candidate	Votes	%	±%
Republican	C. W. "Runt" Bishop	88,810	56.19	+21.05%
Democratic	C. Edwin Hair	69,245	43.81	−21.05%
Total votes		158,055	100.0	

=== 1954 ===
1954 United States House of Representatives General Election
Party	Candidate	Votes	%	±%
Democratic	Kenneth J. Gray	69,562	52.61	+8.80%
Republican	C. W. "Runt" Bishop (incumbent)	62,659	47.39	−8.80%
Total votes		132,221	100.0	

=== 1956 ===
1956 United States House of Representatives General Election
Party	Candidate	Votes	%	±%
Democratic	Kenneth J. Gray (incumbent)	82,845	53.83	+1.22%
Republican	Samuel J. Scott	71,048	46.17	−1.22%
Total votes		153,893	100.0	

=== 1958 ===
1958 United States House of Representatives General Election
Party	Candidate	Votes	%	±%
Democratic	Kenneth J. Gray (incumbent)	78,385	58.22	+4.39%
Republican	Carl D. Sneed	56,257	41.78	−4.39%
Total votes		134,642	100.0	

=== 1960 ===
1960 United States House of Representatives General Election
Party	Candidate	Votes	%	±%
Democratic	Kenneth J. Gray (incumbent)	92,227	57.90	−0.32%
Republican	Gordon E. Kerr	67,067	42.10	+0.32%
Total votes		159,294	100.0	
