= Kent E. Keller =

American politician

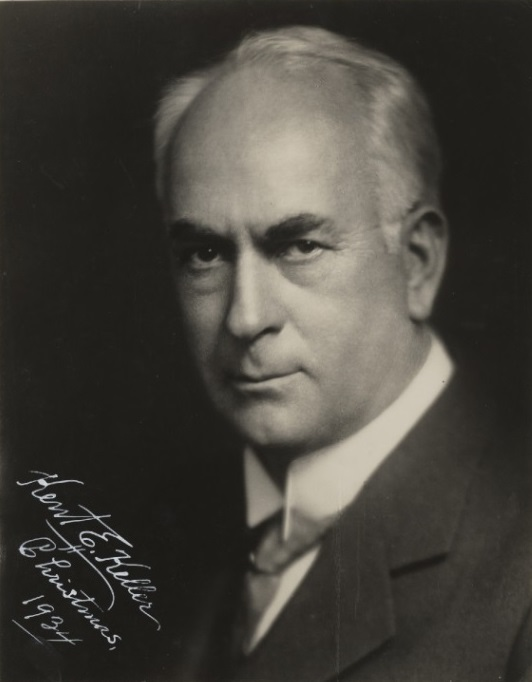
- Keller in 1934

Member of the U.S. House of Representatives from Illinois's 25th district
- In office March 4, 1931 – January 3, 1941
- Preceded by: Edward E. Denison
- Succeeded by: C. W. Bishop

Personal details
- Born: June 4, 1867 Campbell Hill, Illinois
- Died: September 3, 1954 (aged 87) Ava, Illinois
- Party: Democratic

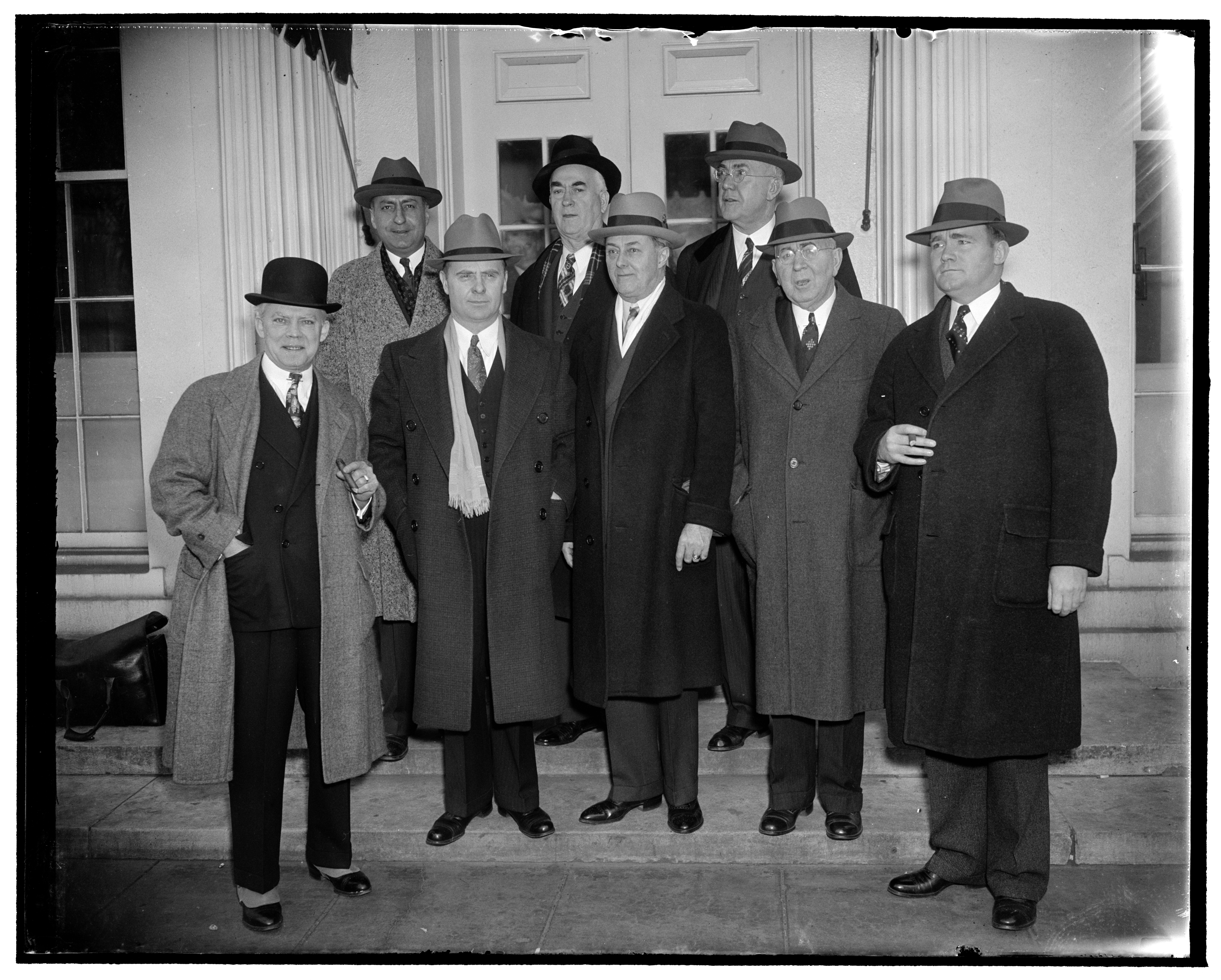
Group of legislators leaves White House after asking Franklin D. Roosevelt for $80,000,000 for flood control in Ohio Valley, March 7, 1938. Front (L–R): Joseph A. Dixon, James G. Polk, Eugene B. Crowe, G W Johnson, and Lawrence E. Imhoff. Rear (L–R) : Peter J. De Muth, Keller, and Brent Spence.

Kent Ellsworth Keller (June 4, 1867 – September 3, 1954) was a U.S. representative from Illinois.

Born on a farm near Campbell Hill, Illinois, Keller attended the public schools in Ava, Illinois, and graduated from Southern Illinois Normal University at Carbondale in 1890. About this time, he founded Ava Community High School.

Keller worked in the newspaper business, including as an editor, in 1890-91. Resuming his education, he attended Heidelberg University, Germany, in 1891–92, and graduated from St. Louis (Missouri) Law School in 1896. During this time, he taught school in Ava in 1893–94, and at Duckwater, Nevada, in 1894–95. He was admitted to the bar in 1896 and commenced practice in Ava.

Keller went to Mexico in 1899, where he later engaged in mining. He returned to Ava in 1912 and engaged in literary work. Keller served in the Illinois State Senate from 1913 to 1917, and served as a delegate to the 1916 Democratic National Convention in St. Louis.

He was elected as a Democrat to the Seventy-second and to the four succeeding Congresses (March 4, 1931 – January 3, 1941). Keller was unsuccessful for re-election to Congress in 1940, and for election to Congress in 1942 and 1944. He returned to literary work and also was a lecturer. From June 1945 to August 1946, he served as special adviser to the United States Ambassador at Mexico City. Keller again was unsuccessful for election to Congress in 1948 and 1950.

He died in Ava on September 3, 1954, and was interred in Ava Evergreen Cemetery.

U.S. House of Representatives
Preceded by Edward E. Denison	Member of the U.S. House of Representatives from Illinois's 25th congressional district March 4, 1931 – January 3, 1941	Succeeded by C. W. Bishop
