= Illinois's 20th congressional district =

Former U.S. House district in Illinois

- Obsolete district
- Created: 1880
- Eliminated: 2000
- Years active: 1883-2003

The 20th congressional district of Illinois was a congressional district for the United States House of Representatives in Illinois. It was eliminated as a result of the 2000 census. It was last represented by John Shimkus who was redistricted into the 19th district.

== List of members representing the district ==
Member	Party	Years	Cong ress	Electoral history
District created March 4, 1883
John R. Thomas (Metropolis)	Republican	March 4, 1883 – March 3, 1889	48th 49th 50th	Redistricted from the 18th district and re-elected in 1882. Re-elected in 1884. Re-elected in 1886. Retired.
George W. Smith (Murphysboro)	Republican	March 4, 1889 – March 3, 1895	51st 52nd 53rd	Elected in 1888. Re-elected in 1890. Re-elected in 1892. Redistricted to the 22nd district.
Orlando Burrell (Carmi)	Republican	March 4, 1895 – March 3, 1897	54th	Elected in 1894. Lost re-election.
James R. Campbell (McLeansboro)	Democratic	March 4, 1897 – March 3, 1899	55th	Elected in 1896. Retired.
James R. Williams (Carmi)	Democratic	March 4, 1899 – March 3, 1903	56th 57th	Elected in 1898. Re-elected in 1900. Redistricted to the 24th district.
Henry T. Rainey (Carrollton)	Democratic	March 4, 1903 – March 3, 1921	58th 59th 60th 61st 62nd 63rd 64th 65th 66th	Elected in 1902. Re-elected in 1904. Re-elected in 1906. Re-elected in 1908. Re-elected in 1910. Re-elected in 1912. Re-elected in 1914. Re-elected in 1916. Re-elected in 1918. Lost re-election.
Guy L. Shaw (Beardstown)	Republican	March 4, 1921 – March 3, 1923	67th	Elected in 1920. Lost re-election.
Henry T. Rainey (Carrollton)	Democratic	March 4, 1923 – August 19, 1934	68th 69th 70th 71st 72nd 73rd	Elected in 1922. Re-elected in 1924. Re-elected in 1926. Re-elected in 1928. Re-elected in 1930. Re-elected in 1932. Died.
Vacant		August 19, 1934 – January 3, 1935	73rd	
Scott W. Lucas (Havana)	Democratic	January 3, 1935 – January 3, 1939	74th 75th	Elected in 1934. Re-elected in 1936. Retired to run for U.S. Senator.
James M. Barnes (Jacksonville)	Democratic	January 3, 1939 – January 3, 1943	76th 77th	Elected in 1938. Re-elected in 1940. Lost re-election.
Sid Simpson (Carrollton)	Republican	January 3, 1943 – October 26, 1958	78th 79th 80th 81st 82nd 83rd 84th 85th	Elected in 1942. Re-elected in 1944. Re-elected in 1946. Re-elected in 1948. Re-elected in 1950. Re-elected in 1952. Re-elected in 1954. Re-elected in 1956. Died.
Vacant		October 26, 1958 – January 3, 1959	85th	
Edna O. Simpson (Carrollton)	Republican	January 3, 1959 – January 3, 1961	86th	Elected in 1958. Retired.
Paul Findley (Pittsfield)	Republican	January 3, 1961 – January 3, 1983	87th 88th 89th 90th 91st 92nd 93rd 94th 95th 96th 97th	Elected in 1960. Re-elected in 1962. Re-elected in 1964. Re-elected in 1966. Re-elected in 1968. Re-elected in 1970. Re-elected in 1972. Re-elected in 1974; Re-elected in 1976. Re-elected in 1978. Re-elected in 1980. Lost re-election.
Dick Durbin (Springfield)	Democratic	January 3, 1983 – January 3, 1997	98th 99th 100th 101st 102nd 103rd 104th	Elected in 1982. Re-elected in 1984. Re-elected in 1986. Re-elected in 1988. Re-elected in 1990. Re-elected in 1992. Re-elected in 1994. Retired to run for U.S. Senator.
John Shimkus (Collinsville)	Republican	January 3, 1997 – January 3, 2003	105th 106th 107th	Elected in 1996. Re-elected in 1998. Re-elected in 2000; Redistricted to the 19th district.
District eliminated January 3, 2003

U.S. House of Representatives
Preceded by Texas's 15th congressional district	Home district of the speaker of the House; March 9, 1933 – August 19, 1934	Succeeded by Tennessee's 5th congressional district
