= Illinois's 1st congressional district =

U.S. House district for Illinois

Coordinates: 41°32′42″N 87°50′09″W

- Interactive map of district boundaries since January 3, 2023
- Representative: Jonathan Jackson; D–Chicago
- Area: 621.6 mi^{2} (1,610 km^{2})
- Population (2025): 766,856
- Median household income: $77,887
- Ethnicity: 49.7% Black; 36.1% White; 9.2% Hispanic; 2.7% Two or more races; 2.0% Asian; 0.4% other
- Cook PVI: D+18

Illinois's first congressional district is a congressional district in the U.S. state of Illinois. Based in Cook County, the district includes much of the South Side of Chicago and continues southwest to Joliet.

From 2003 to early 2013 it extended into the city's southwest suburbs until reaching the border of Will County, and covered 97.84 square miles (253.4 km^{2}), making it one of the 40 smallest districts in the U.S. (although there are four smaller districts in Illinois). The district had a population that was 65% African American, the highest percentage of any congressional district in the nation, but with redistricting that percentage has now declined to 49%. It includes the home of former President Barack Obama, who ran unsuccessfully for the seat in the 2000 primary.

The 1st is a majority-minority district, and has been since at least the 1920s. In 1929, it became the first district in the 20th century to send an African American to Congress when Republican Oscar Stanton De Priest was elected to represent the district. The 1st has been represented by an African American Member of Congress ever since, the longest ongoing stretch of black representation for any seat in the House of Representatives. It has been held by a Democrat since 1935 when Arthur Mitchell, the first African American Democrat elected to Congress, took the seat as part of the New Deal Coalition. In 1949, district representative William Dawson became the first African American to chair a congressional committee.

The district is currently represented by Jonathan Jackson who was elected to succeed longtime incumbent Bobby Rush in 2022.

== Composition ==
For the 118th and successive Congresses (based on redistricting following the 2020 census), the district contains all or portions of the following counties, townships, and municipalities:

Cook County (26)

Alsip (part, also 6th), Blue Island (part, also 2nd), Bremen Township (part, also 2nd and 6th), Calumet Park (part, also 2nd), Calumet Township (part, also 2nd), Chicago (part, also 2nd, 3rd, 4th, 5th, 6th, 7th, 8th, and 9th; shared with DuPage County), Country Club Hills (part, also 2nd), Crestwood (part, also 6th), Dixmoor (part, also 6th), Evergreen Park (part, also 6th), Harvey (part, also 2nd), Lemont (part, also 11th, shared with DuPage and Will counties), Lemont Township (part, also 6th), Markham (part, also 2nd), Matteson (part, also 2nd), Midlothian, Oak Forest (part, also 6th), Orland Park (part, also 6th; shared with Will County), Palos Park, Posen, Rich Township (part, also 2nd), Riverdale (part, also 6th), Robbins, Thornton Township (part, also 2nd), Tinley Park (part, also 6th; shared with Will County), Worth Township (part, also 4th and 6th)

Kankakee County (6)

Bourbonnais (part, also 2nd), Bourbonnais Township (part, also 2nd), Bradley (part, also 2nd), Manteno, Manteno Township (part, also 2nd), Rockville Township

Will County (32)

Braceville (part, also 16th; shared with Grundy County), Braidwood (part, also 16th; shared with Grundy County), Channahon, Channahon Township, Coal City, Custer Township, Diamond (part, also 16th; shared with Grundy County), Elwood (part, also 14th), Florence Township, Frankfort, Frankfort Township, Godley (part, also 16th; shared with Grundy County), Green Garden Township, Homer Glen, Homer Township, Joliet (part, also 14th), Lockport (part, also 14th), Lockport Township (part, also 14th; includes Bonnie Brae and part of Lockport Heights), Manhattan, Manhattan Township, Minooka (part, also 14th; shared with Grundy County), Mokena, New Lenox, New Lenox Township, Orland Park (part, also 6th; shared with Cook County), Peotone Township (part, also 2nd; includes Andres), Reed Township, Troy Township (part, also 14th), Wesley Township, Wilmington, Wilmington Township, Wilton Township

Chicago neighborhoods in the 1st district include:

- Ashburn (part)
- Auburn Gresham
- Burnham Park
- Burnside
- Calumet Heights (part)
- Chatham
- Chicago Lawn (part)
- Douglas (part)
- Greater Grand Crossing
- Hyde Park (part)
- Kenwood (part)
- Morgan Park (part)
- Mt. Greenwood (part)
- Near South Side (part)
- Oakland
- Roseland (part)
- South Chicago (part)
- South Deering (part)
- South Shore (part)
- Washington Heights
- Washington Park (part)
- Woodlawn (part)

=== Economy ===
The departure of the steel industry, along with other manufacturing jobs from the South Side in recent decades, has created economic difficulties which the area is still trying to overcome. The district's median household income as of 2000, $37,222, trailed the national average by 11.4%. The unemployment rate (7.6%) was more than double the national rate, and nearly 20% of district residents were living in poverty. These problems are more pronounced within the Chicago portion of the district – 14 of the district's 18 suburbs had median household incomes over $40,000 as of 1999, with the six most affluent grouped in the southwest corner of the district. But black middle-class Chicago neighborhoods, such as Avalon Park and Chatham, have remained more stable, along with the more upscale Hyde Park-Kenwood area. Health care and higher education now constitute major economic sectors in the region.

Hospitals in the district include Oak Forest Hospital in Oak Forest and Provident Hospital of Cook County in Grand Boulevard, both part of the Cook County Bureau of Health Services; as well as the University of Chicago Hospitals in Hyde Park, Little Company of Mary Hospital in Evergreen Park, Holy Cross Hospital in Chicago Lawn, St. Francis Hospital in Blue Island, Jackson Park Hospital in South Shore and St. Bernard Hospital in Englewood.

Local educational institutions include the University of Chicago in Hyde Park, Illinois Institute of Technology (IIT) in Douglas, Trinity Christian College in Palos Heights and Kennedy-King College, a Chicago city college, in Englewood, and Chicago State University in Roseland is located directly outside the district at its southern edge; in addition, there are five seminaries in Hyde Park: Catholic Theological Union, Chicago Theological Seminary, Lutheran School of Theology, McCormick Theological Seminary and Meadville Lombard Theological School.

Rate Field, home of the Chicago White Sox, is less than 1,000 feet (300 m) west of the district's northwestern border. Other area cultural and entertainment attractions include the DuSable Museum of African American History in Chicago's Washington Park, and First Midwest Bank Amphitheatre in Tinley Park; several square miles of Cook County Forest Preserves can be found on three sides of Oak Forest, and Oak Forest's Chicago Gaelic Park Chicago Gaelic Park is home to Irish Fest, held annually on Memorial Day weekend. Business and industrial presences in the district include Panduit Corporation Network Infrastructure and Industrial Electrical Wiring, an electrical manufacturer in Tinley Park; Parco Foods Startup Domains | Valuable Domains. Invaluable Brands 4 Sale, a cookie manufacturer in Blue Island; and Midwest Suburban Publishing, publisher of the SouthtownStar, in Tinley Park.

In addition to Washington Park and those sites associated with the University of Chicago and IIT, district locations on the National Register of Historic Places include:

- Chicago Beach Hotel, Hyde Park
- Arthur H. Compton House National Historic Landmark, Hyde Park
- East Park Towers, Hyde Park
- Eighth Regiment Armory, Douglas
- Four Nineteen Building, Chatham
- Garden Homes Historic District, Chatham
- Grand Crossing Park, Greater Grand Crossing
- Hamilton Park, Englewood
- Anton E. Hanson House, South Shore
- Isadore H. Heller House National Historic Landmark, Hyde Park
- Hotel Windermere East, Hyde Park
- Hyde Park-Kenwood Historic District
- Jackson Park Historic Landscape District and Midway Plaisance,
  Hyde Park/Washington Park
- Kehilath Anshe Ma'ariv Synagogue, Douglas
- Frank R. Lillie House National Historic Landmark, Hyde Park
- Mayfair Apartments, Hyde Park
- Robert A. Millikan House National Historic Landmark, Hyde Park
- The Narragansett, Kenwood
- Overton Hygienic Building, Douglas
- Poinsettia Apartments, Hyde Park
- Frederick C. Robie House National Historic Landmark, Hyde Park
- Martin Roche-John Tait House, Douglas
- Robert Roloson Houses, Douglas
- St. Thomas Church and Convent, Hyde Park
- South Park Manor Historic District, Greater Grand Crossing
- Lorado Taft Midway Studios National Historic Landmark, Woodlawn
- George R. Thorne House, Midlothian
- Unity Hall, Douglas
- Victory Monument, Douglas
- Karl Vogt Building, Tinley Park
- Ida B. Wells-Barnett House National Historic Landmark, Douglas
- The Yale, Englewood
- Joshua P. Young House, Blue Island

== Recent election results from statewide races ==
Year	Office	Results
2008	President	Obama 79% - 20%
2012	President	Obama 78% - 22%
2016	President	Clinton 72% - 24%
2016	Senate	Duckworth 72% - 23%
2016	Comptroller (Spec.)	Mendoza 66% - 28%
2018	Governor	Pritzker 71% - 24%
2018	Attorney General	Raoul 71% - 27%
2018	Secretary of State	White 80% - 18%
2018	Comptroller	Mendoza 74% - 23%
2018	Treasurer	Frerichs 72% - 25%
2020	President	Biden 70% - 28%
2020	Senate	Durbin 61% - 25%
2022	Senate	Duckworth 69% - 29%
2022	Governor	Pritzker 68% - 30%
2022	Attorney General	Raoul 68% - 30%
2022	Secretary of State	Giannoulias 68% - 30%
2022	Comptroller	Mendoza 70% - 29%
2022	Treasurer	Frerichs 67% - 31%
2024	President	Harris 65% - 33%

=== Presidential election results ===
This table indicates how the district has voted in U.S. presidential elections; election results reflect voting in the district as it was configured at the time of the election, not as it is configured today. The candidate who received the most votes in the district is listed first; the candidate who won the election nationally is in CAPS, and the candidate who won the state of Illinois is indicated with a †.

Election	District winner	Runner up	Other candidates
1852	Scott (W), 6,992 (42%)	PIERCE† (D), 6,948 (41%)	Hale (Free Soil), 2,885 (17%)
1856	Frémont (R), 18,247 (73%)	BUCHANAN† (D), 5,991 (24%)	Fillmore (American), 677 (3%)
1860	LINCOLN† (R), 21,436 (70%)	Douglas (D), 8,940 (29%)	Bell (Constitutional Union), 99 (0.3%); Breckinridge (D), 62 (0.2%)
1864	LINCOLN† (R), 18,667 (81%)	McClellan (D), 4,351 (19%)	
1868	GRANT† (R), 27,527 (59%)	Seymour (D), 19,104 (41%)	
1872... 1948	[data missing]		
1952	Stevenson (D), 99,224 (75%)	EISENHOWER† (R), 33,805 (25%)	
1956	Stevenson (D), 68,266 (64%)	EISENHOWER† (R), 38,827 (36%)	
1960	KENNEDY† (D), 75,938 (77.80%)	Nixon (R), 21,660 (22.19%)}	
1964	JOHNSON† (D), 150,953 (84.91%)	Goldwater (R), 26,823 (15.08%)	
1968	Humphrey (D), 138,835 (93%)	NIXON† (R), 10,081 (7%)	Wallace (AIP), 1,010 (1%)
1972	McGovern (D), 145,003 (90%)	NIXON† (R), 16,998 (10%)	
1976	CARTER (D), 130,882 (90%)	Ford† (R), 13,817 (10%)	
1980	Carter (D), 128,426 (91%)	REAGAN† (R), 6,633 (5%)	Anderson (Indep.), 3,092 (2%)
1984	Mondale (D), 196,351 (95%)	REAGAN† (R), 10,153 (5%)	
1988	Dukakis (D), 174,793 (95%)	G. H. W. BUSH† (R), 7,168 (4%)	
1992	CLINTON† (D), 214,104 (81%)	G. H. W. Bush (R), 32,803 (12%)	Perot (Indep.), 17,355 (7%)
1996	CLINTON† (D), 179,767 (85%)	Dole (R), 22,914 (11%)	Perot (Reform), 6,378 (3%)
2000	Gore† (D), 194,432 (87%)	G. W. BUSH (R), 24,276 (11%)	Nader (Green), 2,867 (1%)
2004	Kerry† (D), 234,086 (83%)	G. W. BUSH (R), 47,533 (17%)	
2008	OBAMA† (D) 287,240 (81%)	McCain (R) 66,840 (19%)	
2012	OBAMA† (D) 262,836 (79%)	Romney (R) 67,557 (20%)	
2016	Clinton† (D) 262,836 (79%)	TRUMP (R) 67,557 (20%)	
2020	BIDEN† (D) 246,946 (74%)	Trump (R) 82,594 (25%)	
2024	Harris† (D) 214,073 (65%)	TRUMP (R) 109,242 (33%)	

== History ==
Democrats routinely dominate politics in the district, with the main focus of competition being the party primary. Only twice since 1966 has a Republican candidate for Congress received over 20% of the vote, and the Democratic nominee has topped 80% in every presidential race during that time. The district's expansion into the suburbs in the 1990s has incorporated a population that has voted Republican more often; Republican support has passed the 10% mark, and George W. Bush received 17% of the vote here in 2004. His was the best showing by a Republican presidential candidate in the district in over 40 years.

The district has since the early 1970s elected representatives who dissented from the city's Democratic establishment. William L. Dawson, U.S. Representative from 1943 to 1970, maintained the district's loyalty to Mayor Richard J. Daley. His successor Ralph Metcalfe initially continued that stance but publicly broke with Daley over an incident of police brutality in 1972, establishing a rift that persists. When Metcalfe died less than one month before the election in 1978, Democratic party officials named loyalist Bennett M. Stewart to take his place on the ballot, and Republicans replaced their candidate with A.A. "Sammy" Rayner, a former Democratic alderman. Despite the campaign support of Jackson for Rayner, Stewart won the election, although Rayner did get over 40% of the vote.

Stewart served only one term and lost the 1980 Democratic primary to reform candidate Harold Washington. He left Congress in 1983 upon being elected mayor, after winning a contentious three-way primary with 37% of the vote. His successor in Congress was union organizer Charles Hayes. Hayes lost the 1992 primary to Bobby Rush by a 42–39% margin following the House banking scandal, in which it was revealed that Hayes had 716 overdrafts on his congressional checking account. Rush had previously lost the 1988 and 1990 primaries to Hayes.

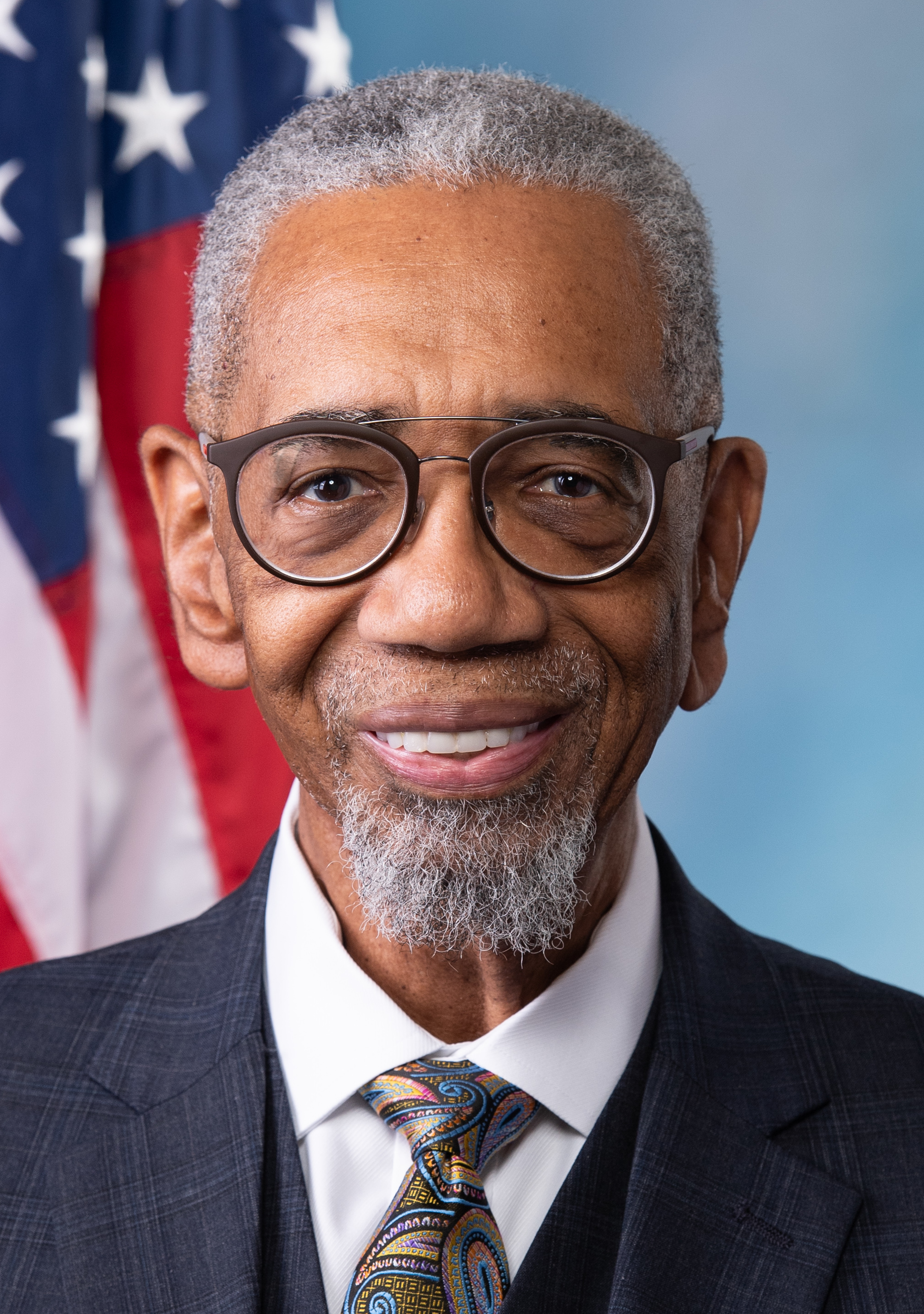
Rep. Bobby Rush

Rush was a co-founder of the Illinois Black Panthers in 1968, establishing a program for free breakfasts for poor children and a clinic for sickle cell anemia screenings. He served as a Chicago alderman from 1983 until his election to Congress in 1993, and he was an ally of Mayor Washington in the Council Wars of the 1980s. While in Congress, Rush consistently voted with the Democratic position over 90% of the time. When he did break from the party, he usually took positions more liberal than other Democrats, rather than taking positions held by Republicans. Rush ran against incumbent Richard M. Daley in the 1999 election for Mayor of Chicago. Despite the support of fellow congressmen Jesse Jackson Jr. and Danny Davis, he was backed by only three out of 50 aldermen and lost the election by a margin of 72–28%. He had a 55–45% advantage among black voters. In the 2000 congressional primary Rush emerged with a 61–30% win over challenger Barack Obama resulting in Obama's only electoral defeat.

In Congress, Rush focused on urban revitalization issues, and he was a staunch supporter of gun control efforts before his adult son Huey (named for Black Panther leader Huey Newton) was killed in a 1999 mugging. Following his son's murder, Rush remained a strong supporter of gun control. During his congressional tenure, Rush generally received perfect ratings of 100 from labor groups including the AFL-CIO and AFSCME, and occasionally also from Americans for Democratic Action, the ACLU and the National Abortion Rights Action League. His lifetime rating from the American Conservative Union is 3.93 on a 0 to 100 scale.

=== Prominent representatives ===
Representative	Notes
John Reynolds	Associate Justice of the Illinois Supreme Court (1818–1824); Elected the 4th governor of Illinois (1830–1834)
William Henry Bissell	Elected the 11th governor of Illinois (1857–1860)
John Wentworth	Elected the 21st mayor of Chicago (1860–1861)
Elihu B. Washburne	Served as Dean of the U.S. House of Representatives (1863–1869); Appointed the 25th U.S. Secretary of State (1869); Appointed the U.S. minister to France (1869–1877)
John Blake Rice	Elected the 24th mayor of Chicago (1865–1869)
Norman B. Judd	Appointed the U.S. envoy to Prussia (1867–1871)
Charles B. Farwell	Elected U.S. Senator from Illinois (1887–1891)
James Robert Mann	Served as U.S. House Minority Leader (1911–1919)
William L. Dawson	Served as a first lieutenant in the U.S. Army during World War I (1917–1919); First African-American to chair a congressional committee.
Ralph Metcalfe	Olympian (1932, 1936); Served as a first lieutenant in the U.S. Army during World War II (1942–1945)
Harold Washington	Elected the 51st mayor of Chicago (1983–1987); First African-American mayor of Chicago

=== Historical boundaries ===
The district was adjacent to the 2nd district to the east and south, the 7th district to the north, and the 3rd and 13th districts to the west, and also bordered the 11th district at its southwest corner. The district's northeast border followed Lake Michigan's shoreline for almost a mile.

The district was created following the 1830 U.S. census and came into existence in 1833, five months before Chicago was organized as a town; the state was previously represented in the U.S. House of Representatives with representative elected on an at-large basis. The district included Southwestern Illinois until 1853. It included the state's northern edge until 1863. Since that time, the district has included all or part of Cook County; since 1883 the population of the district has been primarily residing on Chicago's South Side. Historical populations reflected waves of immigration into the area: previous majority populations were ethnic Irish, German, and east European. Beginning in the mid-19th century, the Irish were the first to establish their physical and political control of the area within the city's South Side.

The current 1st district has a minority-majority population: 51.3% of the residents are African-American. It has been represented in Congress by African Americans since 1929. Tens of thousands of African Americans moved to Chicago from the rural South in the Great Migration. They were confined by discrimination to the South Side of Chicago and gradually replaced ethnic whites who moved out to suburbs. At one point during the 1980s, more than 90% of the district's residents were black.

While successive redistrictings have given the district a larger percentage of white voters, it is still one of the most reliably Democratic districts in the country; with a Cook Partisan Voting Index of D+28, it is the fourth most Democratic district of the eight that divide Chicago. The district has not sent a Republican to the U.S. House of Representatives since 1935. After the civil rights movement gained support from national Democratic Party for major legislation to restore constitutional rights, including the franchise in the South, most African Americans shifted to support the Democratic Party. Democratic congressional candidates routinely receive over 80% of the vote here. The Democratic trend runs right through to the national level; since the 1950s, Democratic presidential candidates have usually carry the district with well over 70 percent of the vote, and have done no worse than 64 percent.

In 2011, following the 2010 census, the state legislature redistricted. It expanded the district to cover parts of Cook and Will Counties. After redistricting, all or parts of Alsip, Blue Island, Calumet Park, Chicago, Country Club Hills, Crestwood, Dixmoor, Elwood, Evergreen Park, Frankfort, Frankfort Square, Harvey, Manhattan, Markham, Merrionette Park, Midlothian, Mokena, New Lenox, Oak Forest, Oak Lawn, Orland Hills, Orland Park, Palos Heights, Posen, Riverdale, Robbins, Tinley Park, and Worth are included. The representative for these districts were elected in the 2012 primary and general elections, and the boundaries became effective on January 3, 2013.

=== Demographics ===
In the twentieth century after the Great Migration from the South and concentration of blacks on the South Side due to de facto residential segregation, the district became the nation's first with a black-majority population. Since the 1920s, it has included the central area of Chicago's South Side African-American community. Over 85% of the district's residents were black during the period from the 1950s through the 1980s, but redistricting since that time – which redrew the district lines with the goal of maintaining three Chicago districts with black populations exceeding 60% – has reduced the percentage of black residents in the district to 70% in the 1990s. The current figure is 65%. Outward migration has caused the South Side's population to decrease over the years, and the district was expanded geographically to the southwest to gain residents, particularly as the state's congressional delegation has been reduced in numbers due to population changes and reapportionment. The district, which covered only nine square miles in the 1950s, is now more than ten times that size. Nearly half its current area was added for the 2000s.

The district's population dropped by 27% in the 1950s, and by 20% in both the 1970s and 1980s, due to outward migration for suburbanization and because of people leaving the area due to loss of jobs. In redistricting after the 1990 U.S. census, the district was extended into the suburbs for the first time in 90 years. Chicago is home to 70% of the district's residents (down from 90% in the 1990s), although roughly 60% of the district's area is outside the city border. The district's white population (almost 30% of its residents) is concentrated in the suburban areas and in a few Chicago neighborhoods such as Hyde Park. The district's largest white ethnic groups are Irish (7.1%), German (6.2%), Polish (4.5%) and Italian (3.2%), mirroring the demographics of the neighboring third and thirteenth congressional districts. There are also sizable Dutch, Swedish, Czech, Palestinian, Greek and Lithuanian populations in the area of Oak Forest, Orland Park and Tinley Park, the district's three largest suburbs. The Kenwood-Hyde Park area for several decades had a significant Jewish community. Existing buildings attest to its history, as the former Kehilath Anshe Ma'ariv temple (its second location) has been the headquarters of Jesse Jackson's Operation PUSH/Rainbow Coalition since 1971. The area also includes a notable presence of Black Muslims and is the home of Nation of Islam leader Louis Farrakhan in Kenwood.

Pope Leo XIV, who retains his American citizenship, is a registered voter under his legal and baptismal name Robert Francis Prevost in New Lenox. He voted in the 2026 United States midterm elections by mailing his mail-in ballot from the Vatican, making him the first pontiff to vote in secular elections after ascension to the papacy.

== List of members representing the district ==
Member	Party	Years	Cong ress	Electoral history	District location
District created March 4, 1833
Charles Slade (Carlyle)	Jacksonian	March 4, 1833 – July 26, 1834	23rd	Elected in 1832. Died.	1833–1843; Included the sixteen counties in the state's southwestern section: Alexander, Bond, Clinton, Franklin, Gallatin, Jackson, Johnson, Macoupin, Madison, Monroe, Perry, Pope, Randolph, St. Clair, Union and Washington counties (five additional counties were later created within this area).
Vacant		July 26, 1834 – December 1, 1834	23rd		1833–1843; Included the sixteen counties in the state's southwestern section: Alexander, Bond, Clinton, Franklin, Gallatin, Jackson, Johnson, Macoupin, Madison, Monroe, Perry, Pope, Randolph, St. Clair, Union and Washington counties (five additional counties were later created within this area).
John Reynolds (Belleville)	Jacksonian	December 1, 1834 – March 3, 1837	23rd 24th	Elected to finish Slade's term Re-elected in 1834. Lost re-election.	1833–1843; Included the sixteen counties in the state's southwestern section: Alexander, Bond, Clinton, Franklin, Gallatin, Jackson, Johnson, Macoupin, Madison, Monroe, Perry, Pope, Randolph, St. Clair, Union and Washington counties (five additional counties were later created within this area).
Adam W. Snyder (Belleville)	Democratic	March 4, 1837 – March 3, 1839	25th	Elected in 1836. Retired.	1833–1843; Included the sixteen counties in the state's southwestern section: Alexander, Bond, Clinton, Franklin, Gallatin, Jackson, Johnson, Macoupin, Madison, Monroe, Perry, Pope, Randolph, St. Clair, Union and Washington counties (five additional counties were later created within this area).
John Reynolds (Belleville)	Democratic	March 4, 1839 – March 3, 1843	26th 27th	Elected in 1838. Re-elected in 1840. [data missing]	1833–1843; Included the sixteen counties in the state's southwestern section: Alexander, Bond, Clinton, Franklin, Gallatin, Jackson, Johnson, Macoupin, Madison, Monroe, Perry, Pope, Randolph, St. Clair, Union and Washington counties (five additional counties were later created within this area).
Robert Smith (Alton)	Democratic	March 4, 1843 – March 3, 1847	28th 29th	Elected in 1842. Re-elected in 1844. Re-elected in 1846. [data missing]	1843–1853; Reduced in size, and now included eleven counties: Alexander, Bond, Clinton, Jackson, Madison, Monroe, Perry, Randolph, St. Clair, Union and Washington counties.
Robert Smith (Alton)	Independent Democratic	March 4, 1847 – March 3, 1849	30th	Elected in 1842. Re-elected in 1844. Re-elected in 1846. [data missing]	1843–1853; Reduced in size, and now included eleven counties: Alexander, Bond, Clinton, Jackson, Madison, Monroe, Perry, Randolph, St. Clair, Union and Washington counties.
William H. Bissell (Belleville)	Democratic	March 4, 1849 – March 3, 1853	31st 32nd	Elected in 1848. Re-elected in 1850. [data missing]	1843–1853; Reduced in size, and now included eleven counties: Alexander, Bond, Clinton, Jackson, Madison, Monroe, Perry, Randolph, St. Clair, Union and Washington counties.
Elihu B. Washburne (Galena)	Whig	March 4, 1853 – March 3, 1855	33rd	Elected in 1852. Re-elected in 1854. Re-elected in 1856. Re-elected in 1858. Re-elected in 1860. [data missing]	1853–1863; Shifted north to cover the eight counties along the state's northern edge: Boone, Carroll, Jo Daviess, Lake, McHenry, Ogle, Stephenson and Winnebago counties. Ulysses S. Grant was a district resident in 1860–61 during the period when he was out of the Army, working in his family's store in Galena, and he became acquainted with Congressman Elihu B. Washburne; Washburne became his political mentor and sponsor, and eventually became Grant's first Secretary of State.
Elihu B. Washburne (Galena)	Republican	March 4, 1855 – March 3, 1863	34th 35th 36th 37th	Elected in 1852. Re-elected in 1854. Re-elected in 1856. Re-elected in 1858. Re-elected in 1860. [data missing]	1853–1863; Shifted north to cover the eight counties along the state's northern edge: Boone, Carroll, Jo Daviess, Lake, McHenry, Ogle, Stephenson and Winnebago counties. Ulysses S. Grant was a district resident in 1860–61 during the period when he was out of the Army, working in his family's store in Galena, and he became acquainted with Congressman Elihu B. Washburne; Washburne became his political mentor and sponsor, and eventually became Grant's first Secretary of State.
Isaac N. Arnold (Chicago)	Republican	March 4, 1863 – March 3, 1865	38th	Elected in 1862. [data missing]	1863–1873; During this decade, beginning during the Civil War, consisted of all of Cook County. Industrialist Cyrus McCormick lost the 1864 House election as the Democratic candidate. Later during this period, the district was devastated by the Great Chicago Fire in October 1871.
John Wentworth (Chicago)	Republican	March 4, 1865 – March 3, 1867	39th	Elected in 1864. [data missing]	1863–1873; During this decade, beginning during the Civil War, consisted of all of Cook County. Industrialist Cyrus McCormick lost the 1864 House election as the Democratic candidate. Later during this period, the district was devastated by the Great Chicago Fire in October 1871.
Norman B. Judd (Chicago)	Republican	March 4, 1867 – March 3, 1871	40th 41st	Elected in 1866. Re-elected in 1868. Retired.	1863–1873; During this decade, beginning during the Civil War, consisted of all of Cook County. Industrialist Cyrus McCormick lost the 1864 House election as the Democratic candidate. Later during this period, the district was devastated by the Great Chicago Fire in October 1871.
Charles B. Farwell (Chicago)	Republican	March 4, 1871 – March 3, 1873	42nd	Elected in 1870. [data missing]	1863–1873; During this decade, beginning during the Civil War, consisted of all of Cook County. Industrialist Cyrus McCormick lost the 1864 House election as the Democratic candidate. Later during this period, the district was devastated by the Great Chicago Fire in October 1871.
John B. Rice (Chicago)	Republican	March 4, 1873 – December 17, 1874	43rd	Elected in 1872. Retired and then died.	1873–1883; Restructured and now included DuPage County, the thirteen townships comprising the southern half of Cook County (Bloom, Bremen, Calumet, Hyde Park, Lake, Lemont, Lyons, Orland, Palos, Rich, Riverside, Thornton, Worth), and the entire South Side and part of the West side of Chicago. The Chicago portion of the district began downtown and extended south to 39th Street (now Pershing Road) east of the Chicago River and south of the river and the Illinois and Michigan Canal, with its western boundary being Western Avenue; on the west side, the district included the area between 16th Street on the north and the river and canal on the south, with the city's western boundary then being Crawford Avenue (now Pulaski Road).
Vacant		December 17, 1874 – February 1, 1875	43rd		
Bernard G. Caulfield (Chicago)	Democratic	February 1, 1875 – March 3, 1877	43rd 44th	Elected to finish Rice's term. Re-elected in 1874. Retired.	
William Aldrich (Chicago)	Republican	March 4, 1877 – March 3, 1883	45th 46th 47th	Elected in 1876. Re-elected in 1878. Re-elected in 1880. Lost renomination.	
Ransom W. Dunham (Chicago)	Republican	March 4, 1883 – March 3, 1889	48th 49th 50th	Elected in 1882. Re-elected in 1884. Re-elected in 1886. Retired.	1883–1895; Remained identical to its previous configuration, except that it no longer included DuPage County or the portion of Chicago west of Clark Street between 16th and 39th Streets. Illinois gained two additional representatives following the 1890 census, but they were elected on an at-large basis for the 1893–1895 term before redistricting occurred, and the previous decade's districting remained in effect.
Abner Taylor (Chicago)	Republican	March 4, 1889 – March 3, 1893	51st 52nd	Elected in 1888. Re-elected in 1890. Retired.	1883–1895; Remained identical to its previous configuration, except that it no longer included DuPage County or the portion of Chicago west of Clark Street between 16th and 39th Streets. Illinois gained two additional representatives following the 1890 census, but they were elected on an at-large basis for the 1893–1895 term before redistricting occurred, and the previous decade's districting remained in effect.
J. Frank Aldric (Chicago)	Republican	March 4, 1893 – March 3, 1897	53rd 54th	Elected in 1892. Re-elected in 1894. Retired.	1883–1895; Remained identical to its previous configuration, except that it no longer included DuPage County or the portion of Chicago west of Clark Street between 16th and 39th Streets. Illinois gained two additional representatives following the 1890 census, but they were elected on an at-large basis for the 1893–1895 term before redistricting occurred, and the previous decade's districting remained in effect.
J. Frank Aldric (Chicago)	Republican	March 4, 1893 – March 3, 1897	53rd 54th	Elected in 1892. Re-elected in 1894. Retired.	1895–1903; Included the seven townships in southeastern Cook County (Bloom, Bremen, Calumet, Orland, Rich, Thornton, Worth), and the portion of Chicago's South Side bordered on the north by 26th Street, and on the west by Wentworth Avenue from 26th to 39th Streets and by State Street from 39th to 63rd Streets before following 63rd Street west to the city's border with Lyons Township (then at Cicero Avenue).
James Robert Mann (Chicago)	Republican	March 4, 1897 – March 3, 1903	55th 56th 57th	Elected in 1896. Re-elected in 1898. Re-elected in 1900. Redistricted to the 2nd district.	1895–1903; Included the seven townships in southeastern Cook County (Bloom, Bremen, Calumet, Orland, Rich, Thornton, Worth), and the portion of Chicago's South Side bordered on the north by 26th Street, and on the west by Wentworth Avenue from 26th to 39th Streets and by State Street from 39th to 63rd Streets before following 63rd Street west to the city's border with Lyons Township (then at Cicero Avenue).
Martin Emerich (Chicago)	Democratic	March 4, 1903 – March 3, 1905	58th	Elected in 1902. Retired.	1903–1949; Confined to the city of Chicago for the first time, and included downtown and the area east of Wentworth to 43rd Street, also reaching west to include Armour Square as well as most of Bridgeport northeast of 33rd and Halsted Streets. Illinois's districts were not redrawn until 1947, taking effect for the 1948 elections. In 1928, Oscar De Priest became the first African American elected to Congress in the 20th century.
Martin B. Madden (Chicago)	Republican	March 4, 1905 – April 27, 1928	59th 60th 61st 62nd 63rd 64th 65th 66th 67th 68th 69th 70th	Elected in 1902. Re-elected in 1904. Re-elected in 1906. Re-elected in 1908. Re-elected in 1910. Re-elected in 1912. Re-elected in 1914. Re-elected in 1916. Re-elected in 1918. Re-elected in 1920. Re-elected in 1922. Re-elected in 1924. Re-elected in 1926. Died.	1903–1949; Confined to the city of Chicago for the first time, and included downtown and the area east of Wentworth to 43rd Street, also reaching west to include Armour Square as well as most of Bridgeport northeast of 33rd and Halsted Streets. Illinois's districts were not redrawn until 1947, taking effect for the 1948 elections. In 1928, Oscar De Priest became the first African American elected to Congress in the 20th century.
Vacant		April 27, 1928 – March 3, 1929	70th		1903–1949; Confined to the city of Chicago for the first time, and included downtown and the area east of Wentworth to 43rd Street, also reaching west to include Armour Square as well as most of Bridgeport northeast of 33rd and Halsted Streets. Illinois's districts were not redrawn until 1947, taking effect for the 1948 elections. In 1928, Oscar De Priest became the first African American elected to Congress in the 20th century.
Oscar S. De Priest (Chicago)	Republican	March 4, 1929 – January 3, 1935	71st 72nd 73rd	Elected in 1928. Re-elected in 1930. Re-elected in 1932. Lost re-election.	1903–1949; Confined to the city of Chicago for the first time, and included downtown and the area east of Wentworth to 43rd Street, also reaching west to include Armour Square as well as most of Bridgeport northeast of 33rd and Halsted Streets. Illinois's districts were not redrawn until 1947, taking effect for the 1948 elections. In 1928, Oscar De Priest became the first African American elected to Congress in the 20th century.
Arthur W. Mitchell (Chicago)	Democratic	January 3, 1935 – January 3, 1943	74th 75th 76th 77th	Elected in 1934. Re-elected in 1936. Re-elected in 1938. Re-elected in 1940. Retired.	1903–1949; Confined to the city of Chicago for the first time, and included downtown and the area east of Wentworth to 43rd Street, also reaching west to include Armour Square as well as most of Bridgeport northeast of 33rd and Halsted Streets. Illinois's districts were not redrawn until 1947, taking effect for the 1948 elections. In 1928, Oscar De Priest became the first African American elected to Congress in the 20th century.
William L. Dawson (Chicago)	Democratic	January 3, 1943 – November 9, 1970	78th 79th 80th 81st 82nd 83rd 84th 85th 86th 87th 88th 89th 90th 91st	Elected in 1942. Re-elected in 1944. Re-elected in 1946. Re-elected in 1948. Re-elected in 1950. Re-elected in 1952. Re-elected in 1954. Re-elected in 1956. Re-elected in 1958. Re-elected in 1960. Re-elected in 1962. Re-elected in 1964. Re-elected in 1966. Re-elected in 1968. Re-elected in 1970. Died.	1903–1949; Confined to the city of Chicago for the first time, and included downtown and the area east of Wentworth to 43rd Street, also reaching west to include Armour Square as well as most of Bridgeport northeast of 33rd and Halsted Streets. Illinois's districts were not redrawn until 1947, taking effect for the 1948 elections. In 1928, Oscar De Priest became the first African American elected to Congress in the 20th century.
William L. Dawson (Chicago)	Democratic	January 3, 1943 – November 9, 1970	78th 79th 80th 81st 82nd 83rd 84th 85th 86th 87th 88th 89th 90th 91st	Elected in 1942. Re-elected in 1944. Re-elected in 1946. Re-elected in 1948. Re-elected in 1950. Re-elected in 1952. Re-elected in 1954. Re-elected in 1956. Re-elected in 1958. Re-elected in 1960. Re-elected in 1962. Re-elected in 1964. Re-elected in 1966. Re-elected in 1968. Re-elected in 1970. Died.	1949–1963; Included that part of Chicago bounded on the north by the river; on the east by the lake to Pershing Road and by Cottage Grove Avenue from Pershing to 71st Street and South Chicago Avenue; on the south by Marquette Road from State Street to South Chicago Avenue, following that southeast to 71st and Cottage Grove; and on the west by Wallace Street (from the river to 25th Street), Canal Street (25th to 31st Street), Wentworth (31st to 43rd Street), the railroad between State and Wentworth (43rd to 59th Street) and State Street (59th to Marquette). The same boundaries were maintained in the redistricting after 1950.
William L. Dawson (Chicago)	Democratic	January 3, 1943 – November 9, 1970	78th 79th 80th 81st 82nd 83rd 84th 85th 86th 87th 88th 89th 90th 91st	Elected in 1942. Re-elected in 1944. Re-elected in 1946. Re-elected in 1948. Re-elected in 1950. Re-elected in 1952. Re-elected in 1954. Re-elected in 1956. Re-elected in 1958. Re-elected in 1960. Re-elected in 1962. Re-elected in 1964. Re-elected in 1966. Re-elected in 1968. Re-elected in 1970. Died.	1963–1967; Included that part of Chicago between 31st and 99th Streets bounded on the west by Wentworth (31st to Garfield Boulevard), the railroad 1/4-mile east of Halsted (Garfield to 59th), Halsted (59th to 63rd), State Street (63rd to 83rd) and Stewart Avenue (83rd to 99th), and bounded on the east by the lake (31st to 46th), Cottage Grove (46th to 65th) and Stony Island Avenue (65th to 99th).
William L. Dawson (Chicago)	Democratic	January 3, 1943 – November 9, 1970	78th 79th 80th 81st 82nd 83rd 84th 85th 86th 87th 88th 89th 90th 91st	Elected in 1942. Re-elected in 1944. Re-elected in 1946. Re-elected in 1948. Re-elected in 1950. Re-elected in 1952. Re-elected in 1954. Re-elected in 1956. Re-elected in 1958. Re-elected in 1960. Re-elected in 1962. Re-elected in 1964. Re-elected in 1966. Re-elected in 1968. Re-elected in 1970. Died.	1967–1973; Additional redistricting for the 1967–1969 term. All of the district's previous territory was retained, but it was extended further north as far as Cermak Road, with its western boundary being the railroad between State and Wentworth (Cermak to 28th Street) and then Wentworth (28th to Garfield). In addition, a small area east of Woodlawn Avenue between 46th and 47th Streets was added.
Vacant		November 9, 1970 – January 3, 1971	91st		1967–1973; Additional redistricting for the 1967–1969 term. All of the district's previous territory was retained, but it was extended further north as far as Cermak Road, with its western boundary being the railroad between State and Wentworth (Cermak to 28th Street) and then Wentworth (28th to Garfield). In addition, a small area east of Woodlawn Avenue between 46th and 47th Streets was added.
Ralph Metcalfe (Chicago)	Democratic	January 3, 1971 – October 10, 1978	92nd 93rd 94th 95th	Elected to finish Dawson's term. Re-elected in 1972. Re-elected in 1974. Re-elected in 1976. Died.	1967–1973; Additional redistricting for the 1967–1969 term. All of the district's previous territory was retained, but it was extended further north as far as Cermak Road, with its western boundary being the railroad between State and Wentworth (Cermak to 28th Street) and then Wentworth (28th to Garfield). In addition, a small area east of Woodlawn Avenue between 46th and 47th Streets was added.
Ralph Metcalfe (Chicago)	Democratic	January 3, 1971 – October 10, 1978	92nd 93rd 94th 95th	Elected to finish Dawson's term. Re-elected in 1972. Re-elected in 1974. Re-elected in 1976. Died.	1973–1983; Included that part of Chicago between 31st and 103rd Streets bounded on the west by King Drive (31st to 35th), State (35th to Pershing), the railroad 1/4-mile west of State (Pershing to Garfield), King Drive (Garfield to Marquette), Yale Avenue (Marquette to 69th), Harvard Avenue (69th to 70th), Stewart (70th to 71st), Halsted (71st to 95th), the railroad 1/2-mile east of Halsted (95th to 99th) and State (99th to 103rd), and on the east by the lake (31st to 71st Street/South Shore Drive), Yates Boulevard (71st to 73rd), Jeffery Boulevard (73rd to 75th) and Stony Island, continuing onto the Calumet Expressway (75th to 103rd, with minor variation at 95th).
Vacant		October 10, 1978 – January 3, 1979	95th		
Bennett M. Stewart (Chicago)	Democratic	January 3, 1979 – January 3, 1981	96th	Elected in 1978. Lost renomination.	
Harold Washington (Chicago)	Democratic	January 3, 1981 – April 30, 1983	97th 98th	Elected in 1980. Re-elected in 1982. Resigned to become Mayor of Chicago.	
Harold Washington (Chicago)	Democratic	January 3, 1981 – April 30, 1983	97th 98th	Elected in 1980. Re-elected in 1982. Resigned to become Mayor of Chicago.	1983–1993; The only remaining district entirely within the city of Chicago, and included that area between Cermak Road and 103rd Street bounded on the west by Federal Street (Cermak to 25th), the railroad 1/4-mile west of State (25th to 35th), the railroad 1/2-mile east of Halsted (35th to 42nd and 43rd to 47th), Stewart (42nd to 43rd), Morgan Street (47th to 48th), Racine Avenue (48th to Garfield), Peoria Street (Garfield to 56th), Green Street (56th to 57th) and Halsted (57th to 103rd), and on the east by the lake (Cermak to 73rd) and Yates (73rd to 103rd).
Vacant		April 30, 1983 – August 23, 1983	98th		
Charles A. Hayes (Chicago)	Democratic	August 23, 1983 – January 3, 1993	98th 99th 100th 101st 102nd	Elected to finish Washington's term Re-elected in 1984. Re-elected in 1986. Re-elected in 1988. Re-elected in 1990. Lost renomination.	
Bobby Rush (Chicago)	Democratic	January 3, 1993 – January 3, 2023	103rd 104th 105th 106th 107th 108th 109th 110th 111th 112th 113th 114th 115th 116th 117th	Elected in 1992. Re-elected in 1994. Re-elected in 1996. Re-elected in 1998. Re-elected in 2000. Re-elected in 2002. Re-elected in 2004. Re-elected in 2006. Re-elected in 2008. Re-elected in 2010. Re-elected in 2012. Re-elected in 2014. Re-elected in 2016. Re-elected in 2018. Re-elected in 2020. Retired.	1993–2003; Expanded into the suburbs for the first time in 90 years, increasing its total area from 32 to 56 square miles (150 km^{2}). It now included: the Chicago communities of Douglas, Oakland, Kenwood, Hyde Park, Woodlawn, Greater Grand Crossing, Avalon Park, Burnside, Chatham and Mount Greenwood; those portions of Auburn Gresham and Washington Heights east of Halsted, those portions of Roseland and Pullman north of 103rd Street, and those portions of Calumet Heights and South Chicago west of Yates Boulevard; the portion of South Deering northwest of 103rd and Yates; South Shore, excepting the area southeast of 71st and Yates; Washington Park, excepting the area northwest of 57th and King Drive; the part of Grand Boulevard north of 43rd Street, as well as most of the area east of Vincennes Avenue; the portion of Armour Square southeast of 35th Street and Princeton Avenue; most of Englewood north of 63rd or east of Halsted; the portion of West Englewood north of 63rd; most of New City southwest of 49th and May Streets; most of Brighton Park southeast of 40th and Kedzie Avenue; portions of Gage Park east of Kedzie, most of Chicago Lawn east of Kedzie, and the portion of Ashburn east of Kedzie; Beverly, excepting the area southeast of 103rd and Prospect Avenue; and most of Morgan Park west of Vincennes. In the suburbs, the district included the villages of Evergreen Park and Merrionette Park, the portion of Alsip east of Cicero Avenue, the portion of Blue Island in Worth Township north of the Calumet Sag Channel, and, with minor variations, the portion of Oak Lawn southeast of 101st and Cicero.
Bobby Rush (Chicago)	Democratic	January 3, 1993 – January 3, 2023	103rd 104th 105th 106th 107th 108th 109th 110th 111th 112th 113th 114th 115th 116th 117th	Elected in 1992. Re-elected in 1994. Re-elected in 1996. Re-elected in 1998. Re-elected in 2000. Re-elected in 2002. Re-elected in 2004. Re-elected in 2006. Re-elected in 2008. Re-elected in 2010. Re-elected in 2012. Re-elected in 2014. Re-elected in 2016. Re-elected in 2018. Re-elected in 2020. Retired.	2003–2013
Bobby Rush (Chicago)	Democratic	January 3, 1993 – January 3, 2023	103rd 104th 105th 106th 107th 108th 109th 110th 111th 112th 113th 114th 115th 116th 117th	Elected in 1992. Re-elected in 1994. Re-elected in 1996. Re-elected in 1998. Re-elected in 2000. Re-elected in 2002. Re-elected in 2004. Re-elected in 2006. Re-elected in 2008. Re-elected in 2010. Re-elected in 2012. Re-elected in 2014. Re-elected in 2016. Re-elected in 2018. Re-elected in 2020. Retired.	2013–2023
Jonathan Jackson (Chicago)	Democratic	January 3, 2023 – present	118th 119th	Elected in 2022. Re-elected in 2024. Re-elected in 2026.	2023–present

== Election results ==
=== 1832–1840 ===
1832 Illinois's 1st congressional district general election
Party	Candidate	Votes	%
Democratic	Charles Slade	2,470	31.28
Democratic-Republican	Ninian Edwards	2,078	26.31
Democratic	Sidney Breese	1,770	22.41
Total votes		7,897	100.0

1834 Illinois's 1st congressional district general election
Party	Candidate	Votes	%
Democratic	John Reynolds	4,136	41.98
Democratic	Adam W. Snyder	3,723	37.79
Unknown	Edward Humphreys	1,990	20.20
Write-in		3	0.03
Total votes		9,852	100.0

1834 Illinois's 1st congressional district special election
Party	Candidate	Votes	%
Democratic	John Reynolds	1,721	47.99
Democratic-Republican	Pierre Menard	871	24.29
Unknown	William Orr	501	13.97
Unknown	Henry L. Webb	490	13.66
Write-in		3	0.08
Total votes		3,586	100.0

1836 Illinois's 1st congressional district general election
Party	Candidate	Votes	%
Democratic	Adam W. Snyder	4,552	40.06
Democratic	John Reynolds (incumbent)	4,441	39.08
Whig	William J. Gatewood	2,370	20.86
Total votes		11,363	100.0

1838 Illinois's 1st congressional district general election
Party	Candidate	Votes	%	±%
Democratic	John Reynolds	8,032	61.16	+22.08%
Whig	John Hogan	5100	38.84	+17.98%
Total votes		13,132	100.0	

=== 1841–1850 ===
1841 Illinois's 1st congressional district general election
Party	Candidate	Votes	%	±%
Democratic	John Reynolds (incumbent)	8,046	59.44	−1.72%
Whig	Henry L. Webb	5,313	39.25	+0.41%
John Tyler Supporter	Stephen R. Rowan	171	1.26	N/A
Write-in		14	0.10	N/A
Total votes		13,537	100.0	

1843 Illinois's 1st congressional district general election
Party	Candidate	Votes	%	±%
Democratic	Robert Smith	7,347	56.11	−3.33%
Whig	James L. D. Morrison	5,568	42.53	+3.28%
Liberty	Robert W. Marshall	176	1.34	N/A
Write-in		2	0.02	-0.08%
Total votes		13,093	100.0	

1844 Illinois's 1st congressional district general election
Party	Candidate	Votes	%	±%
Democratic	Robert Smith (incumbent)	7,966	64.65	+8.54%
Democratic	John Reynolds	4,146	33.65	N/A
Liberty	Robert W. Marshall	191	1.55	+0.21%
Write-in		36	0.29	+0.27%
Total votes		12,321	100.0	

1846 Illinois's 1st congressional district general election
Party	Candidate	Votes	%	±%
Independent Democrat	Robert Smith (incumbent)	7,068	58.13	−6.52%
Democratic	Lyman Trumbull	5,019	41.28	N/A
Liberty	B. Marshall	62	0.51	−1.04%
Write-in		10	0.08	-0.21%
Total votes		12,159	100.0	

1848 Illinois's 1st congressional district general election
Party	Candidate	Votes	%	±%
Democratic	William H. Bissell	9,892	97.74	+56.46%
Liberty	Charles W. Hunter	229	2.26	+1.75%
Total votes		10,121	100.0	

1850 Illinois's 1st congressional district general election
Party	Candidate	Votes	%	±%
Democratic	William H. Bissell (incumbent)	12,841	99.99	+2.25%
Write-in		1	0.01	N/A
Total votes			100.0	

=== 1852–1860 ===
1852 Illinois's 1st congressional district general election
Party	Candidate	Votes	%	±%
Whig	Elihu B. Washburne	7,392	43.93	N/A
Democratic	Thompson Campbell	7,106	42.23	−57.76%
Free Soil	Newman Campbell	2,245	13.34	N/A
Write-in		85	0.51	+0.50%
Total votes		16,828	100.0	

1854 Illinois's 1st congressional district general election
Party	Candidate	Votes	%	±%
Republican	Elihu B. Washburne (incumbent)	8,372	69.33	+25.40%
Democratic	William M. Jackson	2,776	22.99	−19.24%
Anti-Nebraska	E. P. Ferry	927	7.68	N/A
Total votes		12,075	100.0	

1856 Illinois's 1st congressional district general election
Party	Candidate	Votes	%	±%
Republican	Elihu B. Washburne (incumbent)	18,070	72.61	+3.28%
Democratic	Richard S. Molony	6,227	25.02	+2.03%
Unknown	Elisha B. Washburne	331	1.33	N/A
Know Nothing	B. D. Eastman	257	1.03	N/A
Total votes		24,885	100.0	

1858 Illinois's 1st congressional district general election
Party	Candidate	Votes	%	±%
Republican	Elihu B. Washburne (incumbent)	15,811	69.84	−2.77%
Democratic	Hiram Bright	6,457	28.52	+3.50%
Democratic Party (Anti-Lecompton)	Richard H. Jackson	370	1.63	N/A
Total votes		22,638	100.0	

1860 Illinois's 1st congressional district general election
Party	Candidate	Votes	%	±%
Republican	Elihu B. Washburne (incumbent)	21,436	70.56	+0.72%
Democratic	Theodore A. C. Beard	8,929	29.39	+0.87%
Write-in		14	0.05	N/A
Total votes		30,379	100.0	

=== 1862–1870 ===
1862 Illinois's 1st congressional district general election
Party	Candidate	Votes	%	±%
Republican	Isaac N. Arnold	10,025	54.45	−16.11%
Democratic	Francis Cornwall Sherman	8,387	45.55	+16.16%
Total votes		18,412	100.0	

1864 Illinois's 1st congressional district general election
Party	Candidate	Votes	%	±%
National Union	John Wentworth	18,557	56.52	+2.07%
Democratic	Cyrus McCormick	14,277	43.48	−2.07%
Total votes		32,834	100.0	

1866 Illinois's 1st congressional district general election
Party	Candidate	Votes	%	±%
Republican	Norman B. Judd	15,247	72.90	+16.38%
Democratic	Martin R. M. Wallace	5,667	27.10	−16.38%
Total votes		41,828	100.0	

1868 Illinois's 1st congressional district general election
Party	Candidate	Votes	%	±%
Republican	Norman B. Judd (incumbent)	27,414	58.77	−14.13%
Democratic	Martin R. M. Wallace	19,233	41.23	+14.13%
Total votes		46,647	100.0	

1870 Illinois's 1st congressional district general election
Party	Candidate	Votes	%	±%
Republican	Charles B. Farwell	40,684	57.52	−1.25%
Democratic	John Wentworth	15,025	42.48	+1.25%
Total votes		70,734	100.0	

=== 1872–1880 ===
1872 Illinois's 1st congressional district general election
Party	Candidate	Votes	%	±%
Republican	John Blake Rice	12,870	64.01	+6.49%
Liberal Republican	Lucien B. Otis	7,235	35.99	N/A
Total votes		20,105	100.0	

1874 Illinois's 1st congressional district general election
Party	Candidate	Votes	%	±%
Democratic	Bernard G. Caulfield	10,211	51.02	N/A
Republican	Sidney Smith	9,803	48.98	−15.03%
Total votes		20,014	100.0	

1875 Illinois's 1st congressional district special election
Party	Candidate	Votes	%	±%
Democratic	Bernard G. Caulfield	3,461	81.96	+30.94%
Unknown	H. Eddy	454	10.75	N/A
Unknown	Henry Vallettee	308	7.29	N/A
Total votes		4,223	100.0	

1876 Illinois's 1st congressional district general election
Party	Candidate	Votes	%	±%
Republican	William Aldrich	16,587	53.21	N/A
Democratic	John Randolph Hoxie	14,101	45.23	−36.73%
Greenback	George S. Bowen	486	1.56	N/A
Total votes		31,174	100.0	

1878 Illinois's 1st congressional district general election
Party	Candidate	Votes	%	±%
Republican	William Aldrich (incumbent)	12,165	51.84	−1.37%
Democratic	James Rood Doolittle	7,136	30.41	−14.82%
Socialist Labor	John McAuliff	2,322	9.90	N/A
Greenback	William V. Barr	1,844	7.86	+6.30%
Total votes		23,467	100.0	

1880 Illinois's 1st congressional district general election
Party	Candidate	Votes	%	±%
Republican	William Aldrich (incumbent)	22,307	53.79	+1.95%
Democratic	John Mattocks	18,024	43.47	+13.06%
Socialist Labor	J. J. Altpeter	605	1.46	−8.44%
Greenback	Richard Powers	532	1.28	−6.58%
Total votes		41,468	100.0	

=== 1882–1890 ===
1882 Illinois's 1st congressional district general election
Party	Candidate	Votes	%	±%
Republican	Ransom W. Dunham	11,571	50.86	−2.93%
Democratic	John W. Downes	10,534	46.31	+2.84%
Greenback	Alonzo J. Glover	644	2.83	+1.55%
Total votes		22,749	100.0	

1884 Illinois's 1st congressional district general election
Party	Candidate	Votes	%	±%
Republican	Ransom W. Dunham (incumbent)	20,245	56.73	+5.87%
Democratic	William M. Tilden	14,655	41.06	−5.25%
Greenback	Jno. B. Clark	501	1.40	−1.43%
Unknown	William B. Clark	288	0.81	N/A
Total votes		35,689	100.0	

1886 Illinois's 1st congressional district general election
Party	Candidate	Votes	%	±%
Republican	Ransom W. Dunham (incumbent)	12,321	46.89	−9.84%
Democratic	Edgar Terhune	7,258	27.62	−13.44%
Labor	Harvey Sheldon, Jr.	6,358	24.20	N/A
Prohibition	George C. Christian	337	1.28	N/A
Total votes		26,274	100.0	

1888 Illinois's 1st congressional district general election
Party	Candidate	Votes	%	±%
Republican	Abner Taylor	26,553	52.86	+5.97%
Democratic	James F. Todd	22,697	45.19	+17.57%
Prohibition	Harry S. Taylor	981	1.95	+0.67%
Total votes		50,231	100.0	

1890 Illinois's 1st congressional district general election
Party	Candidate	Votes	%	±%
Republican	Abner Taylor (incumbent)	22,235	49.95	−2.91%
Democratic	William G. Ewing	21,796	48.96	+3.77%
Prohibition	Isaac H. Pedrick	483	1.09	−0.86%
Total votes		44,514	100.0	

=== 1892–1900 ===
1892 Illinois's 1st congressional district general election
Party	Candidate	Votes	%	±%
Republican	J. Frank Aldrich	39,726	49.68	−0.27%
Democratic	Edwin B. Smith	37,904	47.40	−1.56%
Prohibition	Winfield S. McComas	1,738	2.17	+1.08%
Populist	Alfred Clark	566	0.71	N/A
Labor	P. J. Weldon	32	0.04	N/A
Total votes		79,966	100.0	

1894 Illinois's 1st congressional district general election
Party	Candidate	Votes	%	±%
Republican	J. Frank Aldrich (incumbent)	33,902	63.15	+13.47%
Democratic	Max Dembufsky	12,854	23.94	−23.46%
Populist	Howard S. Taylor	5,996	11.17	+10.46%
Prohibition	William H. Craig	667	1.24	−0.93%
Independent American Citizen	Winfield S. McComas	269	0.50	N/A
Total votes		53,688	100.0	

1896 Illinois's 1st congressional district general election
Party	Candidate	Votes	%	±%
Republican	James Robert Mann	51,582	67.64	+4.49%
Democratic	James H. Teller	23,123	30.32	+6.38%
Populist	Benjamin J. Werthermer	957	1.25	−9.92%
Unknown	Thomas R. Strobridge	595	0.78	N/A
Total votes		76,257	100.0	

1898 Illinois's 1st congressional district general election
Party	Candidate	Votes	%	±%
Republican	James Robert Mann (incumbent)	37,500	63.23	−4.41%
Democratic	Rollin B. Organ	20,424	34.43	+4.11%
Socialist Labor	Bernard Berlyn	568	0.96	N/A
Prohibition	Theodore L. Neff	414	0.70	N/A
Populist	James Hogan	404	0.68	−0.57%
Total votes		59,310	100.0	

1900 Illinois's 1st congressional district general election
Party	Candidate	Votes	%	±%
Republican	James Robert Mann (incumbent)	52,775	63.02	−0.21%
Democratic	Leon Hornstein	28,858	34.46	+0.03%
Social Democratic	William H. Collins	1,208	1.44	N/A
Prohibition	William P. Ferguson	899	1.07	+0.37%
Total votes		83,740	100.0	

=== 1902–1910 ===
1902 Illinois's 1st congressional district general election
Party	Candidate	Votes	%	±%
Democratic	Martin Emerich	16,591	51.29	+16.83%
Republican	Martin B. Madden	15,339	47.42	−15.60%
Prohibition	Howard T. Wilcoxon	415	1.28	+0.21%
Total votes		32,345	100.0	

1904 Illinois's 1st congressional district general election
Party	Candidate	Votes	%	±%
Republican	Martin B. Madden	24,097	58.00	+10.58%
Democratic	John S. Oehman	9,166	22.06	−29.23%
Independent Republican	David S. Geer	5,175	12.46	N/A
Socialist	Edward Loewenthal	2,334	5.62	N/A
Prohibition	William H. Craig	416	1.00	−0.28%
Populist	Charles Roberts	234	0.56	N/A
Continental Party	J. P. Lynch	127	0.31	N/A
Total votes		41,549	100.0	

1906 Illinois's 1st congressional district general election
Party	Candidate	Votes	%	±%
Republican	Martin B. Madden (incumbent)	17,015	59.32	+1.32%
Democratic	Martin Emerich	10,015	34.92	+12.86%
Socialist	J. H. Greer	1,402	4.89	−0.73%
Prohibition	Amasa Orelup	251	0.88	−0.12%
Total votes		28,683	100.0	

1908 Illinois's 1st congressional district general election
Party	Candidate	Votes	%	±%
Republican	Martin B. Madden (incumbent)	23,370	60.92	+1.60%
Democratic	Matthew L. Mandable	13,692	35.69	+0.77%
Socialist	Joseph N. Greer	825	2.15	−2.74%
Independent	Henry W. Young	469	1.22	N/A
Independent	Charles McCormick	7	0.02	N/A
Total votes		38,363	100.0	

1910 Illinois's 1st congressional district general election
Party	Candidate	Votes	%	±%
Republican	Martin B. Madden (incumbent)	14,920	49.99	−10.93%
Democratic	Michael E. Maher	13,466	45.12	+9.43%
Socialist	Joseph H. Greer	1,165	3.90	+1.75%
Prohibition	H. E. Eckles	293	0.98	N/A
Total votes		29,844	100.0	

=== 1912 ===
1912 Illinois's 1st congressional district general election
Party	Candidate	Votes	%	±%
Republican	Martin B. Madden (incumbent)	13,608	52.16	+2.17%
Democratic	Andrew Donovan	9,967	38.20	−6.92%
Socialist	William F. Barnard	2,217	8.50	+4.60%
Prohibition	W. H. Rogers	299	1.15	+0.17%
Total votes		26,091	100.0	

=== 1914 ===
1914 Illinois's 1st congressional district general election
Party	Candidate	Votes	%	±%
Republican	Martin B. Madden (incumbent)	13,063	53.22	+1.06%
Democratic	James M. Quinlan	9,060	36.91	−1.29%
Progressive	Henry M. Ashton	1,758	7.16	N/A
Socialist	Charles Leffler	662	2.70	−5.80%
Total votes		24,543	100.0	

=== 1916 ===
1916 Illinois's 1st congressional district general election
Party	Candidate	Votes	%	±%
Republican	Martin B. Madden (incumbent)	20,380	59.06	+5.84%
Democratic	William J. Hennessey	13,380	38.77	+1.86%
Socialist	Robert H. Howe	749	2.17	−0.53%
Total votes		34,509	100.0	

=== 1918 ===
1918 Illinois's 1st congressional district general election
Party	Candidate	Votes	%	±%
Republican	Martin B. Madden (incumbent)	12,580	55.33	−3.73%
Democratic	George Mayer	9,776	43.00	+4.23%
Socialist	G. J. Carlisle	381	1.68	−0.49%
Total votes		22,737	100.0	

=== 1920 ===
1920 Illinois's 1st congressional district general election
Party	Candidate	Votes	%	±%
Republican	Martin B. Madden (incumbent)	41,907	75.91	+20.58%
Democratic	James A. Gorman	12,398	22.46	−20.54%
Socialist	Willis E. Davis	899	1.63	−0.05%
Total votes		55,204	100.0	

=== 1922 ===
1922 Illinois's 1st congressional district general election
Party	Candidate	Votes	%	±%
Republican	Martin B. Madden (incumbent)	23,895	59.09	−16.82%
Democratic	George Mayer	15,999	39.56	+17.10%
Socialist	Charles Hallbeck	427	1.06	−0.57%
Farmer–Labor	John H. Kennedy	120	0.30	N/A
Total votes		40,441	100.0	

=== 1924 ===
1924 Illinois's 1st congressional district general election
Party	Candidate	Votes	%	±%
Republican	Martin B. Madden (incumbent)	43,661	73.05	+13.96%
Democratic	James F. Doyle	13,623	22.79	−16.77%
Independent	Samuel A. T. Watkins	2,232	3.73	N/A
Socialist	Elmer Whitmore	220	0.37	−0.69%
Independent	Gordon Owens	32	0.05	N/A
Total votes		59,768	100.0	

=== 1926 ===
1926 Illinois's 1st congressional district general election
Party	Candidate	Votes	%	±%
Republican	Martin B. Madden (incumbent)	26,559	68.20	−4.85%
Democratic	James F. Doyle	12,283	31.54	+8.75%
Progressive	G. Victor Cools	101	0.26	N/A
Total votes		38,943	100.0	

=== 1928 ===
1928 Illinois's 1st congressional district general election
Party	Candidate	Votes	%	±%
Republican	Oscar DePriest	24,479	47.79	−20.41%
Democratic	Harry Baker	20,664	40.34	+8.80%
Independent	William Harrison	5,861	11.44	N/A
Independent	Benjamin W. Clayton	123	0.24	N/A
Independent	Edward L. Doty	100	0.20	N/A
Total votes		51,227	100.0	

=== 1930 ===
1930 Illinois's 1st congressional district general election
Party	Candidate	Votes	%	±%
Republican	Oscar DePriest (incumbent)	23,719	58.36	+10.57%
Democratic	Harry Baker	16,747	41.21	+0.87%
Independent	George W. Harts	68	0.17	N/A
Independent	T. W. Chavers	64	0.16	N/A
Independent	Edward Turner	44	0.11	N/A
Total votes		40,642	100.0	

=== 1932 ===
1932 Illinois's 1st congressional district general election
Party	Candidate	Votes	%	±%
Republican	Oscar DePriest (incumbent)	33,672	54.77	−3.59%
Democratic	Harry Baker	26,959	43.85	+2.64%
Independent	Herbert Newton	843	1.37	N/A
Total votes		61,474	100.0	

=== 1934 ===
1934 Illinois's 1st congressional district general election
Party	Candidate	Votes	%	±%
Democratic	Arthur W. Mitchell	27,963	52.97	+9.12%
Republican	Oscar DePriest (incumbent)	24,829	47.03	−7.74%
Total votes		52,792	100.0	

=== 1936 ===
1936 Illinois's 1st congressional district general election
Party	Candidate	Votes	%	±%
Democratic	Arthur W. Mitchell (incumbent)	35,376	55.10	+2.13%
Republican	Oscar DePriest	28,640	44.61	−2.42%
Independent	Harry Haywood	192	0.30	N/A
Total votes		64,208	100.0	

=== 1938 ===
1938 Illinois's 1st congressional district general election
Party	Candidate	Votes	%	±%
Democratic	Arthur W. Mitchell (incumbent)	30,207	53.37	−1.73%
Republican	William L. Dawson	26,396	46.63	+2.02%
Total votes		56,603	100.0	

=== 1940 ===
1940 Illinois's 1st congressional district general election
Party	Candidate	Votes	%	±%
Democratic	Arthur W. Mitchell (incumbent)	34,641	53.02	−0.35%
Republican	William E. King	30,698	46.98	+0.35%
Total votes		65,339	100.0	

=== 1942–1950 ===
1942 Illinois's 1st congressional district general election
Party	Candidate	Votes	%	±%
Democratic	William L. Dawson	26,280	52.75	−0.27%
Republican	William E. King	23,537	47.25	+0.27%
Total votes		49,817	100.0	

1944 Illinois's 1st congressional district general election
Party	Candidate	Votes	%	±%
Democratic	William L. Dawson (incumbent)	42,713	61.98	+9.23%
Republican	William E. King	26,204	38.02	−9.23%
Total votes		68,917	100.0	

1946 Illinois's 1st congressional district general election
Party	Candidate	Votes	%	±%
Democratic	William L. Dawson (incumbent)	38,040	56.79	−5.19%
Republican	William E. King	28,945	43.21	+5.19%
Total votes		66,985	100.0	

1948 Illinois's 1st congressional district general election
Party	Candidate	Votes	%	±%
Democratic	William L. Dawson (incumbent)	98,690	66.96	+10.17%
Republican	William E. King	43,034	29.20	−14.01%
Progressive	Earl B. Dickerson	5,669	3.85	N/A
Total votes		147,393	100.0	

1950 Illinois's 1st congressional district general election
Party	Candidate	Votes	%	±%
Democratic	William L. Dawson (incumbent)	69,506	61.74	−5.22%
Republican	Archibald James Carey, Jr.	41,944	37.26	+8.06%
Progressive	Samuel J. Parks	1,135	1.01	−2.84%
Total votes		112,585	100.0	

=== 1952–1960 ===
1952 Illinois's 1st congressional district general election
Party	Candidate	Votes	%	±%
Democratic	William L. Dawson (incumbent)	95,899	73.50	+11.76%
Republican	Edgar G. Brown	34,571	26.50	−10.76%
Total votes		130,470	100.0	

1954 Illinois's 1st congressional district general election
Party	Candidate	Votes	%	±%
Democratic	William L. Dawson (incumbent)	71,472	75.28	+1.78%
Republican	Genoa S. Washington	23,470	24.72	−1.78%
Total votes		94,942	100.0	

1956 Illinois's 1st congressional district general election
Party	Candidate	Votes	%	±%
Democratic	William L. Dawson (incumbent)	66,704	64.42	−10.86%
Republican	George W. Lawrence	36,847	35.58	+10.86%
Total votes		103,551	100.0	

1958 Illinois's 1st congressional district general election
Party	Candidate	Votes	%	±%
Democratic	William L. Dawson (incumbent)	60,778	72.22	+7.80%
Republican	Dr. Theodore R. M. Howard	23,384	27.78	−7.80%
Total votes		84,162	100.0	

1960 Illinois's 1st congressional district general election
Party	Candidate	Votes	%	±%
Democratic	William L. Dawson (incumbent)	75,938	77.81	+5.59%
Republican	Genoa S. Washington	21,660	22.19	−5.59%
Total votes		97,598	100.0	

=== 1962–1970 ===
1962 Illinois's 1st congressional district general election
Party	Candidate	Votes	%	±%
Democratic	William L. Dawson (incumbent)	98,305	74.09	−3.72%
Republican	Benjamin C. Duster	34,379	25.91	+3.72%
Total votes		132,684	100.0	

1964 Illinois's 1st congressional district general election
Party	Candidate	Votes	%	±%
Democratic	William L. Dawson (incumbent)	150,953	84.91	+10.82%
Republican	Wilbur N. Daniel	26,823	15.09	−10.82%
Total votes		177,776	100.0	

1966 Illinois's 1st congressional district general election
Party	Candidate	Votes	%	±%
Democratic	William L. Dawson (incumbent)	91,119	72.58	−12.33%
Republican	David R. Reed	34,421	27.42	+12.33%
Total votes		125,540	100.0	

1968 Illinois's 1st congressional district general election
Party	Candidate	Votes	%	±%
Democratic	William L. Dawson (incumbent)	119,207	84.56	+11.98%
Republican	Janet Roberts Jennings	21,758	15.44	−11.98%
Total votes		140,965	100.0	

1970 Illinois's 1st congressional district general election
Party	Candidate	Votes	%	±%
Democratic	Ralph H. Metcalfe	93,272	90.96	+6.40%
Republican	Janet Roberts Jennings	9,267	9.04	−6.40%
Total votes		102,539	100.0	

=== 1972–1980 ===
1972 Illinois's 1st congressional district general election
Party	Candidate	Votes	%	±%
Democratic	Ralph H. Metcalfe (incumbent)	136,755	91.39	+0.43%
Republican	Louis H. Coggs	12,877	8.61	−0.43%
Write-in		2	0.00	N/A
Total votes		149,634	100.0	

1974 Illinois's 1st congressional district general election
Party	Candidate	Votes	%	±%
Democratic	Ralph H. Metcalfe (incumbent)	75,206	93.74	+2.35%
Republican	Oscar H. Haynes	4,399	5.48	−3.13%
Socialist Workers	Willie Mae Reid	620	0.77	N/A
Total votes		80,225	100.0	

=== 2002 ===
Illinois's 1st Congressional District Election (2002)
Party	Candidate	Votes	%
Democratic	Bobby Rush*	149,068	81.17
Republican	Raymond G. Wardingley	29,776	16.21
Libertarian	Dorothy Tsatsos	4,812	2.62
Total votes		183,656	100.00
Turnout			
Democratic hold			

=== 2004 ===
Illinois's 1st Congressional District Election (2004)
Party	Candidate	Votes	%
Democratic	Bobby Rush*	211,115	84.82
Republican	Raymond G. Wardingley	37,793	15.18
Total votes		248,908	100.00
Turnout			
Democratic hold			

=== 2006 ===
Illinois's 1st Congressional District Election (2006)
Party	Candidate	Votes	%
Democratic	Bobby Rush*	146,623	84.06
Republican	Jason E. Tabour	27,804	15.94
Total votes		174,427	100.00
Turnout			
Democratic hold			

=== 2008 ===
Illinois's 1st Congressional District Election (2008)
Party	Candidate	Votes	%
Democratic	Bobby Rush*	233,036	85.87
Republican	Antoine Members	38,361	14.13
Total votes		271,397	100.00
Turnout			
Democratic hold			

=== 2010 ===
Illinois's 1st Congressional District Election (2010)
Party	Candidate	Votes	%
Democratic	Bobby Rush*	148,170	80.36
Republican	Raymond G. Wardingley	29,253	15.87
Green	Jeff Adams	6,963	3.78
Total votes		184,386	100.00
Turnout			
Democratic hold			

=== 2012 ===
Illinois's 1st congressional district, 2012
Party	Candidate	Votes	%
Democratic	Bobby Rush (incumbent)	236,854	73.8
Republican	Donald Peloquin	83,989	26.2
Independent	John Hawkins (write-in)	1	0.0
Total votes		320,844	100.0
Democratic hold			

=== 2014 ===
Illinois's 1st congressional district, 2014
Party	Candidate	Votes	%
Democratic	Bobby Rush (incumbent)	162,268	73.1
Republican	Jimmy Lee Tillman	59,749	26.9
Total votes		222,017	100.0
Democratic hold			

=== 2016 ===
Illinois's 1st congressional district, 2016
Party	Candidate	Votes	%
Democratic	Bobby Rush (incumbent)	234,037	74.1
Republican	August Deuser	81,817	25.9
Independent	Tabitha Carson (write-in)	8	0.0
Total votes		315,862	100.0
Democratic hold			

=== 2018 ===
Illinois's 1st congressional district, 2018
Party	Candidate	Votes	%
Democratic	Bobby Rush (incumbent)	189,560	73.5
Republican	Jimmy Lee Tillman, II	50,960	19.8
Independent	Thomas Rudbeck	17,365	6.7
Total votes		257,885	100.0
Democratic hold			

=== 2020 ===
Illinois's 1st congressional district, 2020
Party	Candidate	Votes	%	±%
Democratic	Bobby Rush (incumbent)	239,943	73.80	+0.29%
Republican	Philanise White	85,027	26.15	+6.39%
Write-in		153	0.05	N/A
Total votes		325,123	100.0	
Democratic hold				

=== 2022 ===
Illinois's 1st congressional district, 2022
Party	Candidate	Votes	%
Democratic	Jonathan Jackson	159,142	67.03
Republican	Eric Carlson	78,258	32.96
Write-in		25	0.01
Total votes		237,425	100.0
Democratic hold			

=== 2024 ===
Illinois's 1st congressional district, 2024
Party	Candidate	Votes	%	±%
Democratic	Jonathan Jackson (incumbent)	208,398	65.84	−1.19%
Republican	Marcus Lewis	108,064	34.14	+1.18%
Write-in		45	0.02	N/A
Total votes		316,507	100.0	
Democratic hold				

== See also ==
- Illinois's congressional districts
- List of United States congressional districts

Preceded by Texas's 17th congressional district	Home district of the president of the United States; January 20, 2009 – January 20, 2017	Succeeded by New York's 12th congressional district
