= Hamilton Park =

Hamilton Park may refer to:

== United Kingdom ==
- Hamilton Park Racecourse, Scotland, a horse racing venue

== United States ==
- Hamilton Park (New Haven), Connecticut, a former sports venue
- Hamilton Park (Waterbury, Connecticut), a public park
- Hamilton Park (Chicago), Illinois, a public park
- Hamilton Park, Jersey City, New Jersey, a neighborhood
- Hamilton Park, a public park in Weehawken, New Jersey
- Hamilton Park, Staten Island, New York, a neighborhood
- Hamilton Park, Dallas, Texas, a neighborhood

== New Zealand ==
- Hamilton Park cemetery and statistical area, Newstead, Waikato

== See also ==
- Hamilton Park Historic District (disambiguation)
