= Martin B. Madden =

American politician

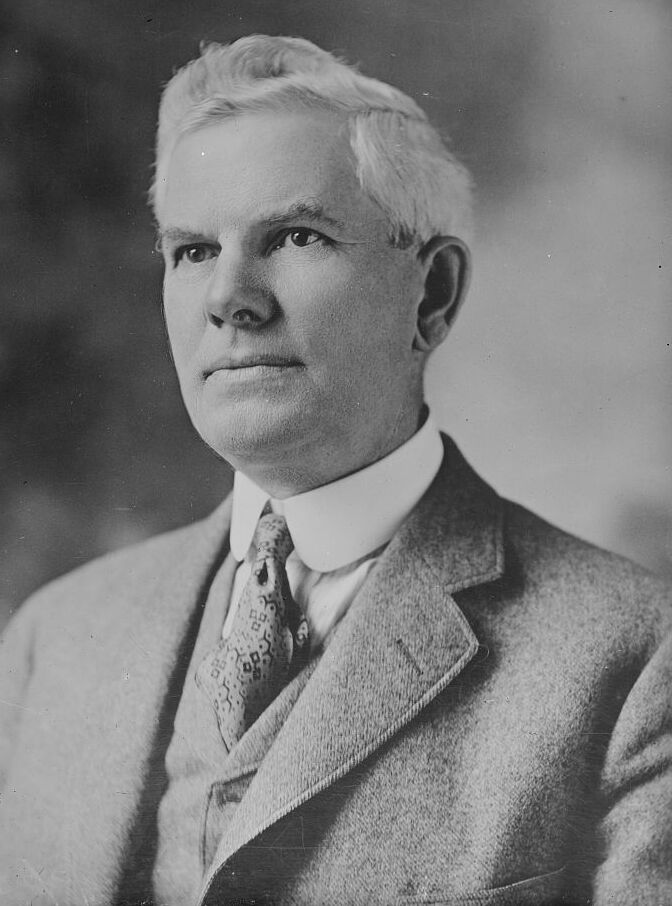
- 1918 photograph of Madden

Member of the U.S. House of Representatives from Illinois's 1st district
- In office March 4, 1905 – April 27, 1928
- Preceded by: Martin Emerich
- Succeeded by: Oscar S. De Priest

Chicago Alderman from the 4th ward
- In office 1889–1897 Serving with John W. Hepburn (1889–1896); William S. Jackson (1896–1897)
- Preceded by: Harry D. Hammer
- Succeeded by: Abraham A. Ballenberg

Personal details
- Born: March 21, 1855 Wolviston, County Durham, England
- Died: April 27, 1928 (aged 73) Washington, D.C.
- Party: Republican
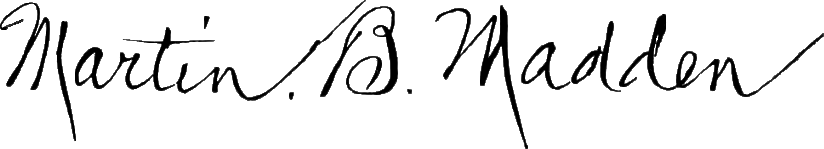
- Signature

Martin Barnaby Madden (March 21, 1855 – April 27, 1928) was a U.S. representative from Illinois. He belonged to the Republican Party. As of 2025, he is the last non-African American to serve as a representative for Illinois's 1st congressional district.

== Biography ==
Born in 1855 in Wolviston, County Durham, England, Madden immigrated to the United States in 1869 with his parents, who were born in Ireland. They settled near Lemont, Illinois. He attended public school in Chicago and graduated from Bryant and Stratton Business College in 1873. He also graduated from an engineering trade school.

Madden served as president of the Quarry Owners' Association of the United States 1885–1889. He served as vice president and director of the Builders' and Traders' Exchange of Chicago in 1886 and 1887.

Illustration of Madden, circa 1893

A member of the Republican Party, he was elected and served several years as a member of the Chicago City Council 1889–1897. He served as presiding officer of that body 1891–1893 and chairman of the finance committee for seven years. He served as chairman of the Republican Committee of Chicago 1890–1896.

Photograph of Madden, circa 1896

Gaining greater influence, he was chosen as a delegate to the Republican National Conventions in 1896, 1900, 1912, 1916 and 1924. In 1902 he was an unsuccessful candidate for election to the Fifty-eighth Congress.

Madden continued to serve in several leadership positions in business: as president of the Western Stone Co. 1895–1915. He served as a director of the Metropolitan Trust & Savings Bank of Chicago 1895–1910.

In 1904 Madden was elected as a Republican to the 59th Congress. He was re-elected to the eleven succeeding Congresses, serving from March 4, 1905, until his death. He served as chairman of the influential Committee on Appropriations (Sixty-eighth through Seventieth Congresses).

1923 photograph of Madden

After being nominated for re-election in 1928, Madden died at age 73 in the Committee on Appropriations meeting room of the House of Representatives in the U.S. Capitol in Washington, D.C. He was buried at Cass Cemetery, near Hinsdale, Illinois, as was his wife Josephine six years later. Today Cass Cemetery is located in incorporated Darien, Illinois.

== Legacy ==
In 1935, the Madden Dam on the Chagres River in the Panama Canal water system was named after him, as was the reservoir behind it, Madden Lake. That was renamed by Panama as Lake Alajuela.

== Electoral history ==
Illinois's 1st congressional district general election, 1902
Party	Candidate	Votes	%
Democratic	Martin Emerich	16,591	51.29
Republican	Martin B. Madden	15,339	47.42
Prohibition	Howard T. Wilcoxon	415	1.28
Total votes		32,345	100.0

Illinois's 1st congressional district general election, 1904
Party	Candidate	Votes	%
Republican	Martin B. Madden	24,097	58.00
Democratic	John S. Oehman	9,166	22.06
Independent Republican	David S. Geer	5,175	12.46
Socialist	Edward Loewenthal	2,334	5.62
Prohibition	William H. Craig	416	1.00
Populist	Charles Roberts	234	0.56
Continental Party	J. P. Lynch	127	0.31
Total votes		41,549	100.0

Illinois's 1st congressional district general election, 1906
Party	Candidate	Votes	%
Republican	Martin B. Madden (incumbent)	17,015	59.32
Democratic	Martin Emerich	10,015	34.92
Socialist	J. H. Greer	1,402	4.89
Prohibition	Amasa Orelup	251	0.88
Total votes		28,683	100.0

Illinois's 1st congressional district general election, 1908
Party	Candidate	Votes	%
Republican	Martin B. Madden (incumbent)	23,370	60.92
Democratic	Matthew L. Mandable	13,692	35.69
Socialist	Joseph N. Greer	825	2.15
Independent	Henry W. Young	469	1.22
Independent	Charles McCormick	7	0.02
Total votes		38,363	100.0

Illinois's 1st congressional district general election, 1910
Party	Candidate	Votes	%
Republican	Martin B. Madden (incumbent)	14,920	49.99
Democratic	Michael E. Maher	13,466	45.12
Socialist	Joseph H. Greer	1,165	3.90
Prohibition	H. E. Eckles	293	0.98
Total votes		29,844	100.0

Illinois's 1st congressional district general election, 1912
Party	Candidate	Votes	%
Republican	Martin B. Madden (incumbent)	13,608	52.16
Democratic	Andrew Donovan	9,967	38.20
Socialist	William F. Barnard	2,217	8.50
Prohibition	W. H. Rogers	299	1.15
Total votes		26,091	100.0

Illinois's 1st congressional district general election, 1914
Party	Candidate	Votes	%
Republican	Martin B. Madden (incumbent)	13,063	53.22
Democratic	James M. Quinlan	9,060	36.91
Progressive	Henry M. Ashton	1,758	7.16
Socialist	Charles Leffler	662	2.70
Total votes		24,543	100.0

Illinois’s 1st congressional district Republican primary, 1916
Party	Candidate	Votes	%
Republican	Martin B. Madden (incumbent)	8,070	90.67
Republican	Andrew B. Hulit	536	6.02
Republican	Robert Brand	294	3.30
Total votes		8,900	100.0

Illinois's 1st congressional district general election, 1916
Party	Candidate	Votes	%
Republican	Martin B. Madden (incumbent)	20,380	59.06
Democratic	William J. Hennessey	13,380	38.77
Socialist	Robert H. Howe	749	2.17
Total votes		34,509	100.0

Illinois’s 1st congressional district Republican primary, 1918
Party	Candidate	Votes	%
Republican	Martin B. Madden (incumbent)	7,621	68.44
Republican	James A. Scott	3,514	31.56
Total votes		11,135	100.0

Illinois's 1st congressional district general election, 1918
Party	Candidate	Votes	%
Republican	Martin B. Madden (incumbent)	12,580	55.33
Democratic	George Mayer	9,776	43.00
Socialist	G. J. Carlisle	381	1.68
Total votes		22,737	100.0

Illinois’s 1st congressional district Republican primary, 1920
Party	Candidate	Votes	%
Republican	Martin B. Madden (incumbent)	18,138	73.91
Republican	W. A. Blackwell	4,204	17.13
Republican	Richard E. Parker	2,198	8.96
Total votes		24,540	100.0

Illinois's 1st congressional district general election, 1920
Party	Candidate	Votes	%
Republican	Martin B. Madden (incumbent)	41,907	75.91
Democratic	James A. Gorman	12,398	22.46
Socialist	Willis E. Davis	899	1.63
Total votes		55,204	100.0

Illinois’s 1st congressional district Republican primary, 1922
Party	Candidate	Votes	%
Republican	Martin B. Madden (incumbent)	14,193	83.32
Republican	Richard E. Parker	2,842	16.68
Total votes		17,035	100.0

Illinois's 1st congressional district general election, 1922
Party	Candidate	Votes	%
Republican	Martin B. Madden (incumbent)	23,895	59.09
Democratic	George Mayer	15,999	39.56
Socialist	Charles Hallbeck	427	1.06
Farmer–Labor	John H. Kennedy	120	0.30
Total votes		40,441	100.0

Illinois’s 1st congressional district Republican primary, 1924
Party	Candidate	Votes	%
Republican	Martin B. Madden (incumbent)	12,796	60.78
Republican	Nathan S. Taylor	8,258	39.22
Total votes		21,054	100.0

Illinois's 1st congressional district general election, 1924
Party	Candidate	Votes	%
Republican	Martin B. Madden (incumbent)	43,661	73.05
Democratic	James F. Doyle	13,623	22.79
Independent	Samuel A. T. Watkins	2,232	3.73
Socialist	Elmer Whitmore	220	0.37
Independent	Gordon Owens	32	0.05
Total votes		59,768	100.0

Illinois’s 1st congressional district Republican primary, 1926
Party	Candidate	Votes	%
Republican	Martin B. Madden (incumbent)	17,698	78.56
Republican	P. W. Chavers	4,831	21.44
Total votes		22,529	100.0

Illinois's 1st congressional district general election, 1926
Party	Candidate	Votes	%
Republican	Martin B. Madden (incumbent)	26,559	68.20
Democratic	James F. Doyle	12,283	31.54
Progressive	G. Victor Cools	101	0.26
Total votes		38,943	100.0

Illinois's 1st congressional district Republican primary, 1928
Party	Candidate	Votes	%
Republican	Martin B. Madden (incumbent)	22,427	68.15
Republican	William L. Dawson	9,424	28.64
Republican	George J. Witt	541	1.64
Republican	Chandler Owen	315	0.96
Republican	T. W. Shavers	200	0.61
Total votes		32,907	100.0

== See also ==
- List of members of the United States Congress who died in office (1900–1949)
- List of Speaker of the United States House of Representatives elections § December 1923

U.S. House of Representatives
Preceded by Martin Emerich	Member of the U.S. House of Representatives from Illinois's 1st congressional district 1905–1928	Succeeded by Oscar S. De Priest
