= J. Frank Aldrich =

American politician

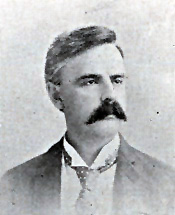

Member of the U.S. House of Representatives from Illinois's 1st district
- In office March 4, 1893 – March 3, 1897
- Preceded by: Abner Taylor
- Succeeded by: James Robert Mann

President of the Cook County Board of Commissioners
- In office 1886–1887
- Preceded by: George C. Klehm
- Succeeded by: Henry C. Senne

Member of the Cook County Board of Commissioners
- In office 1886–1888

Personal details
- Born: James Franklin Aldrich; April 6, 1853 Two Rivers, Wisconsin
- Died: March 8, 1933 (aged 79) Chicago, Illinois
- Party: Republican
- Spouse(s): Lulu M. Sherman (m. 1878; died 1897) Mariska Aldrich (m. 1901; div. 1915)

James Franklin Aldrich (April 6, 1853 – March 8, 1933) was an American politician and civil engineer. From 1893-1897 he served as a United States representative from Illinois.

== Biography ==
The son of William Aldrich and Anna Mary Aldrich (née Howard), James Franklin Aldrich was born on April 6, 1853, in Two Rivers, Wisconsin. He moved with his parents to Chicago, Illinois, in April 1861 where he attended the public schools. Later, he attended Chicago University and graduated from Rensselaer Polytechnic Institute, Troy, New York, in 1877 with a degree in civil engineering. In 1878 he was elected a member of the Civil Engineers' Club of the Midwest. He initially was engaged in the manufacturing of linseed oil, and later worked in the gas business.

On November 13, 1878 Aldrich married his first wife, Lulu M. Sherman, in Chicago. Lulu was the daughter of American Civil War general Francis Trowbridge Sherman. They remained married until Lulu's death in 1897. They had three children, Eleanor, Martha, and Sherman.

Aldrich was a member of the Cook County Board of Commissioners from 1886 to 1888, serving as president in 1887. He declined to seek re-election to the board in 1888. Aldrich was also a member of the county board of education in 1887 and commissioner of public works of Chicago from May 1, 1891, to January 1, 1893. Aldrich was elected as a Republican to the Fifty-third and Fifty-fourth Congresses (March 4, 1893 – March 3, 1897) and served as chairman, Committee on Accounts (Fifty-fourth Congress). He was not a candidate for renomination in 1896; deciding to retire at the end of the 54th United States Congress.

After leaving Congress, Aldrich was appointed Consul General at Havana, Cuba in 1897, but did not reach his post to serve owing to the sinking of the battleship Maine and to the war with Spain which followed. He was the receiver of national banks, and railroad appraiser, from 1898 until 1923.

On April 18, 1901, Aldrich married opera singer Mariska Agan (known on the stage under her married name as Mariska Aldrich). They divorced on October 21, 1915. They had two children, Meeka and Fred. Meeka had a career as a stage and film actress.

Aldrich died on March 8, 1933 at the King Home For Old Men in Chicago, Illinois, at age 79. He was buried in Rosehill Cemetery in Chicago, Illinois.

U.S. House of Representatives
Preceded by Abner Taylor	Member of the U.S. House of Representatives from Illinois's 1st congressional district 1893–1897	Succeeded by James Robert Mann
