= Hamilton Park Historic District =

Hamilton Park Historic District may refer to:

- Hamilton Park Historic District (Jersey City, New Jersey), listed on the National Register of Historic Places in Hudson County
- Hamilton Park Historic District (Columbus, Ohio), listed on the National and Columbus historic registers

== See also ==
- Hamilton Park (disambiguation)
