= James Robert Mann (Illinois politician) =

American politician and attorney (1856–1922)

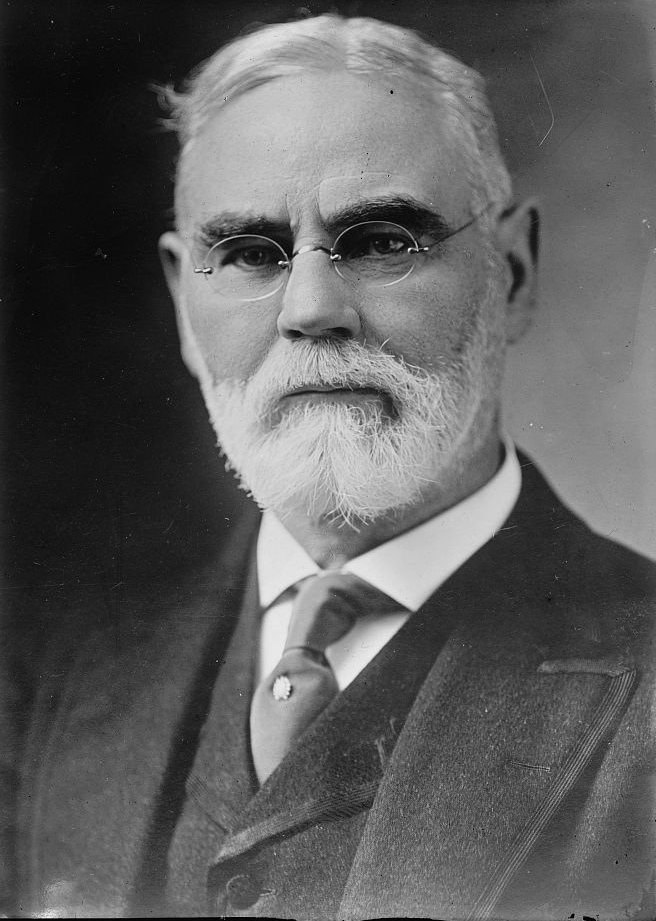
- Mann in 1916

House Minority Leader
- In office March 4, 1911 – March 3, 1919
- Preceded by: Champ Clark
- Succeeded by: Champ Clark

Leader of the House Republican Conference
- In office March 4, 1911 – March 3, 1919
- Preceded by: Joseph Gurney Cannon
- Succeeded by: Frederick H. Gillett

Member of the U.S. House of Representatives from Illinois
- In office March 4, 1897 – November 30, 1922
- Preceded by: J. Frank Aldrich
- Succeeded by: Morton D. Hull
- Constituency: 1st district (1897–1903); 2nd district (1903–22)

Chicago Alderman from the 32nd Ward
- In office 1892–1896

Personal details
- Born: October 20, 1856 Bloomington, Illinois, US
- Died: November 30, 1922 (aged 66) Washington, D.C., US
- Resting place: Oak Woods Cemetery
- Party: Republican
- Education: University of Illinois; Union College of Law

James Robert Mann (October 20, 1856 – November 30, 1922) was an American politician and attorney who served as a member of the United States House of Representatives from Illinois from 1897 to 1922. He was a member of the Republican Party, and served as House Minority Leader from 1911 to 1919.

== Early life and education ==
James Robert Mann was born near Bloomington, McLean County, Illinois, on October 20, 1856. His older brother was Frank Irving Mann (1854–1937) farmer, editor of the Prairie Farmer news publication, and author of The Farmers Creed.

Mann attended University of Illinois and graduated in 1876. He graduated from Union College of Law in 1881 and became a lawyer in Chicago. Mann held several local political offices before serving in the House of Representatives.

== Career ==
He was admitted to the Illinois bar in 1881 and commenced his practice in Chicago. He held several local offices before being elected as a congressman:

- Member of the Oakland Board of Education in Chicago (1887)
- Attorney for Hyde Park and the South Park commissioners of Chicago
- Chairman of the Illinois State Republican convention (1894)
- Member of the City Council of Chicago (1892–1896)
- Master in chancery of the Superior Court of Cook County
- Chairman of the Republican county conventions at Chicago (1895, 1902)
- Elected as Republican (1896) to the 55th Congress with 13 successive terms

=== Service in the House ===
- Chairman, Committee on Elections No. 1 (58th–60th Congresses)
- Committee on Interstate and Foreign Commerce (61st Congress)
- Committee on Women Suffrage (66th Congress)
- Minority Leader (62nd–65th Congresses)

=== Notable legislation ===
James Mann (right) with Speaker of the House Champ Clark. 1911–1919

Congressman Mann was one of the sponsors of the Mann-Elkins Act, which gave more power to the Interstate Commerce Commission to regulate railroad rates. He is probably best known for his authorship of the Mann Act of 1910, which was a reaction to the "white slavery" issue and prohibited transportation of women between states for purposes of prostitution. He introduced legislation that became the Pure Food and Drugs Act of 1906.

He was considered to be a leader in the cause of amending the United States Constitution to grant suffrage to women. However, he was quoted as saying, "'They should have been at home where they belonged,' referring to the women in the pageant." He was a leading opponent of the Harrison Narcotics Tax Act and Prohibition, despite the popularity of such legislation amongst his fellow Midwestern progressives.

== Death ==
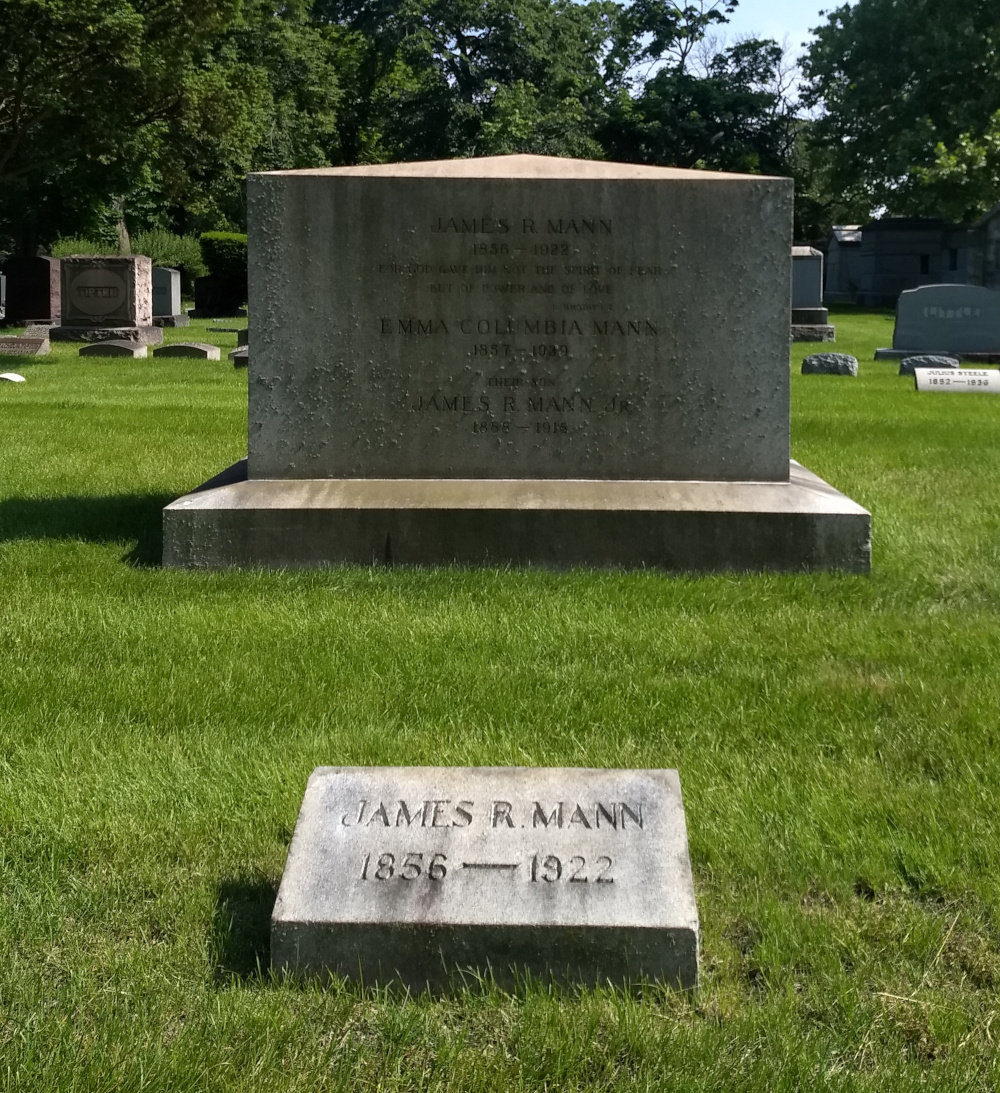
Mann's grave at Oak Woods Cemetery

Mann died in Washington, D.C., of pneumonia on November 30, 1922, at age 66 before the close of the 67th United States Congress. He was interred in Oak Woods Cemetery in Chicago.

== Electoral history ==
Illinois's 1st congressional district general election, 1896
Party	Candidate	Votes	%
Republican	James Robert Mann	51,582	68.17
Democratic	James H. Teller	23,123	30.56
Populist	Benjamin J. Werthermer	957	1.27
Total votes		75,662	100.0

Illinois's 1st congressional district general election, 1898
Party	Candidate	Votes	%
Republican	James Robert Mann (incumbent)	37,506	63.22
Democratic	Rollin B. Organ	20,424	34.43
Socialist Labor	Bernard Berlyn	568	0.96
Prohibition	Theodore L. Neff	424	0.72
Populist	James Hogan	404	0.68
Total votes		59,326	100.0

Illinois's 1st congressional district general election, 1900
Party	Candidate	Votes	%
Republican	James Robert Mann (incumbent)	52,775	63.02
Democratic	Leon Hornstein	28,858	34.46
Social Democratic	William H. Collins	1,208	1.44
Prohibition	William P. Ferguson	899	1.07
Total votes		83,740	100.0

== See also ==
- List of members of the United States Congress who died in office (1900–1949)

U.S. House of Representatives
Preceded by J. Frank Aldrich	Member of the U.S. House of Representatives from Illinois's 1st congressional district 1897–1903	Succeeded by Martin Emerich
Preceded by John J. Feely	Member of the U.S. House of Representatives from Illinois's 2nd congressional district 1903–1922	Succeeded by Morton D. Hull
