= Martin Emerich =

American politician (1846–1922)

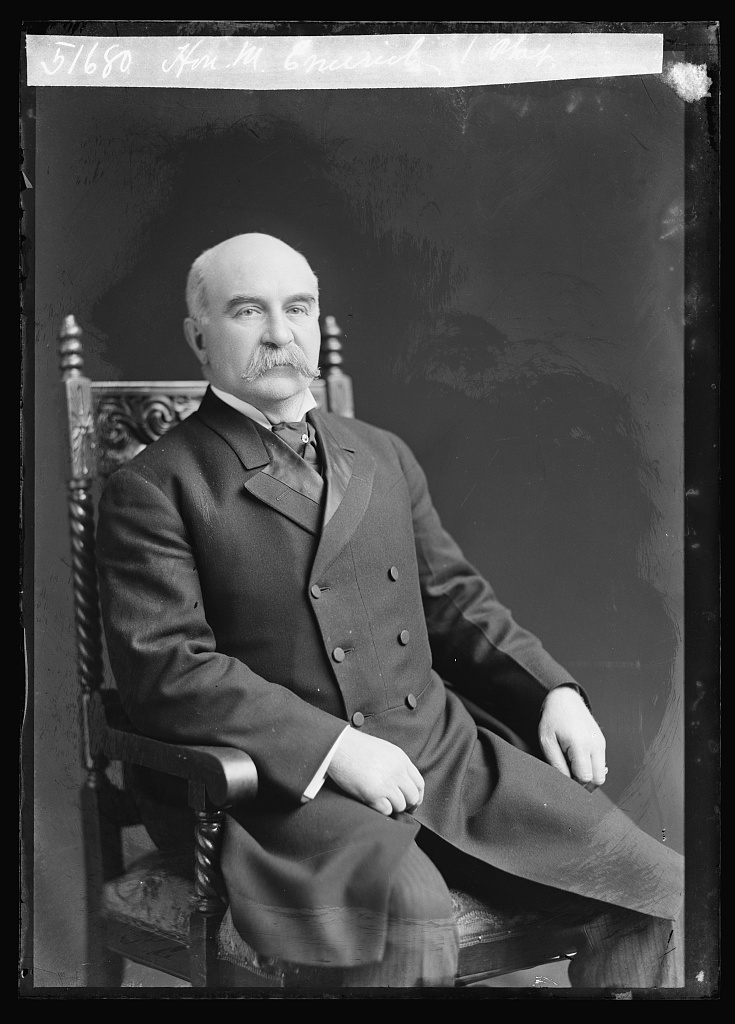

Member of the U.S. House of Representatives from Illinois's 1st district
- In office March 4, 1903 – March 3, 1905
- Preceded by: James Robert Mann
- Succeeded by: Martin B. Madden

Member of the Cook County Board of Commissioners
- In office 1892-1894

Member of the Maryland House of Delegates
- In office 1881-1883

Personal details
- Born: April 27, 1846 Baltimore, Maryland, US
- Died: September 25, 1922 (aged 76) New York City, US
- Party: Democratic

Martin Emerich (April 27, 1846 – September 25, 1922) was a U.S. representative from Illinois.

Born in Baltimore, Maryland, Emerich attended the public schools. He engaged in the importing business. He was appointed ward commissioner of the poor of Baltimore in 1870. He served as member of the Maryland House of Delegates 1881–1883. He served as aide-de-camp to Governor William T. Hamilton 1880–1884, and to Governor Elihu E. Jackson 1884–1887. He moved to Chicago, Illinois in 1887 and engaged in mercantile pursuits until 1896, when he engaged in the manufacture of bricks. He served as member of the Board of Commissioners of Cook County 1892–1894. He served as assessor of South Chicago 1897.

Emerich was elected as a Democrat to the Fifty-eighth Congress (March 4, 1903 – March 3, 1905). He was not a candidate for renomination in 1904. He retired in 1905. He died while on a visit in New York City on September 25, 1922, at age 76, and was interred in Rosehill Cemetery in Chicago.

== Electoral history ==
Illinois's 1st congressional district general election, 1902
Party	Candidate	Votes	%
Democratic	Martin Emerich	16,591	51.29
Republican	Martin B. Madden	15,339	47.42
Prohibition	Howard T. Wilcoxon	415	1.28
Total votes		32,345	100.0

== See also ==
- List of Jewish members of the United States Congress

U.S. House of Representatives
Preceded by James Robert Mann	Member of the U.S. House of Representatives from Illinois's 1st congressional district 1903–1905	Succeeded by Martin B. Madden
