= Abner Taylor =

American politician

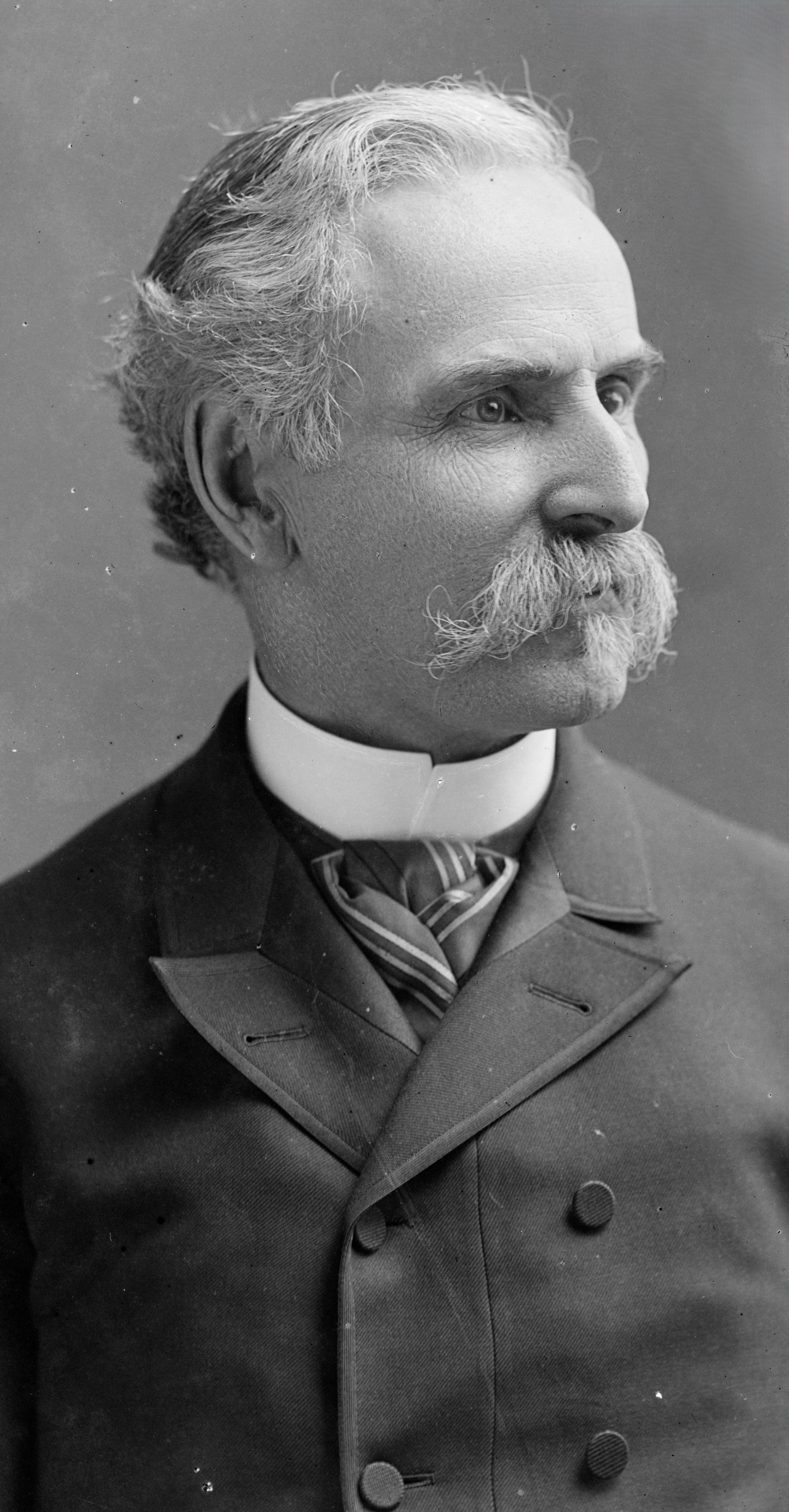
- C. M. Bell Collection, Library of Congress

Member of the U.S. House of Representatives from Illinois's 1st district
- In office March 4, 1889 – March 3, 1893
- Preceded by: Ransom W. Dunham
- Succeeded by: J. Frank Aldrich

Member of the Illinois House of Representatives
- In office 1884-1886

Personal details
- Born: January 19, 1829 Bangor, Maine, U.S.
- Died: April 13, 1903 (aged 74) Washington, D.C., U.S.
- Resting place: Rock Creek Cemetery; Washington, D.C., U.S.
- Party: Republican
- Spouse: Clara Babcock (m. 1889)

Military service
- Allegiance: Union
- Branch/service: Army
- Rank: General's deputy; United States Treasury agent
- Battles/wars: American Civil War

Abner Taylor (January 19, 1829 – April 13, 1903) was a U.S. representative from Illinois.

Born in Bangor, Maine, Taylor moved with his parents to Champaign County, Ohio, in 1832, thence to Fort Dodge, Iowa, and subsequently to Chicago, Illinois, in 1860. He served the Union the American Civil War as a general's deputy, and later a colonel and United States Treasury agent. As a business man, Taylor engaged in extensive contracting, building, and mercantile pursuits, and participated in the construction of the Texas State Capitol. In exchange for the construction of the Texas State House, Taylor was awarded three million acres of land in northwest Texas in 1882. He served as a delegate to the 1884 Republican National Convention. Further, Taylor served as a member of the Illinois House of Representatives from 1884 to 1886.

Taylor was elected as a Republican to the Fifty-first and Fifty-second Congresses (March 4, 1889 – March 3, 1893). He married Clara Babcock, a daughter of business associate Colonel A C Babcock on September 9, 1889, in Cassopolis, Michigan. Clara was nearly thirty-two years his junior. The millionaire and his lively bride were well known in Congress. Clara made international news when she announced that rather than keeping Congressmen's signatures in an autograph book, she would have them embroidered onto a petticoat in silk to keep as a record of the 52nd Congress.

Taylor did not campaign in 1892, he instead resumed the building and contracting business. He died in Washington, D.C., in 1903, and was interred in Rock Creek Cemetery.

== See also ==
- XIT Ranch

U.S. House of Representatives
Preceded by Ransom W. Dunham	Member of the U.S. House of Representatives from Illinois's 1st congressional district 1889–1893	Succeeded by J. Frank Aldrich
