= Ransom W. Dunham =

American politician

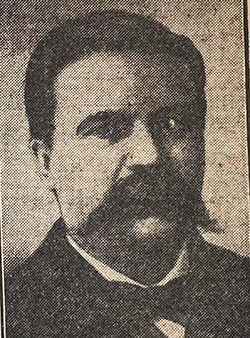
- 1882 portrait photograph

Member of the U.S. House of Representatives from Illinois's 1st district
- In office March 4, 1883 – March 3, 1889
- Preceded by: William Aldrich
- Succeeded by: Abner Taylor

President of the Chicago Board of Trade
- In office 1882
- Preceded by: Henry W. Rodgers Jr.
- Succeeded by: James B. Hobbs

First Vice-President of the Chicago Board of Trade
- In office 1881
- Preceded by: Henry W. Rodgers Jr.
- Succeeded by: William E. McHenry

Second Vice-President of the Chicago Board of Trade
- In office 1880
- Preceded by: Henry W. Rodgers Jr.
- Succeeded by: William E. McHenry

Personal details
- Born: March 21, 1838 Savoy, Massachusetts, US
- Died: August 19, 1896 (aged 58) Springfield, Massachusetts, US
- Resting place: Mount Hope Cemetery, Chicago, Illinois, US
- Party: Republican
- Occupation: Grain and provision merchant

Ransom Williams Dunham (March 21, 1838 – August 19, 1896) was an American businessman and politician from Chicago. A Republican, from 1883 to 1889 he served as a U.S. representative from Illinois. He also served on the Chicago Board of Trade, including as its president.

== Early life, education, and career ==
Dunham was born in Savoy, Massachusetts on March 21, 1838. He attended the local schools and the high school in Springfield. After completing his education, Dunham worked as a clerk for the MassMutual life insurance company from 1855 to 1857.

== Chicago mercantile career and Chicago Board of Trade ==
In 1857, Dunham moved to Chicago, where he became a grain and provision merchant.

In 1880 he served as the Chicago Board of Trade's second vice-president. In 1881, he served as its first vice-president. In 1882, he served an elected term as its president. During his presidency of the board, the cornerstone was laid for a new building for the board, construction of which was ultimately completed in 1885.

== U.S. House of Representatives ==
Chicago Tribune illustration of Dunham at the 1888 Cook County Republican Party convention

In 1882 Dunham was elected to the United States House of Representatives as a Republican. He was reelected in 1884 and 1886, and served in the 48th, 49th, and 50th United States Congress (March 4, 1883 to March 3, 1889). He represented Illinois's 1st congressional district.

== Later life and death ==
After leaving Congress, Dunham retired from politics and business. He died in Springfield, Massachusetts on August 19, 1896, while en route to attend Savoy's centennial celebration. He was buried at Mount Hope Cemetery in Chicago.

U.S. House of Representatives
Preceded by William Aldrich	Member of the U.S. House of Representatives from Illinois's 1st congressional district 1883–1889	Succeeded by Abner Taylor
