= George R. Thorne House =

Historic house in Illinois, United States

- U.S. National Register of Historic Places
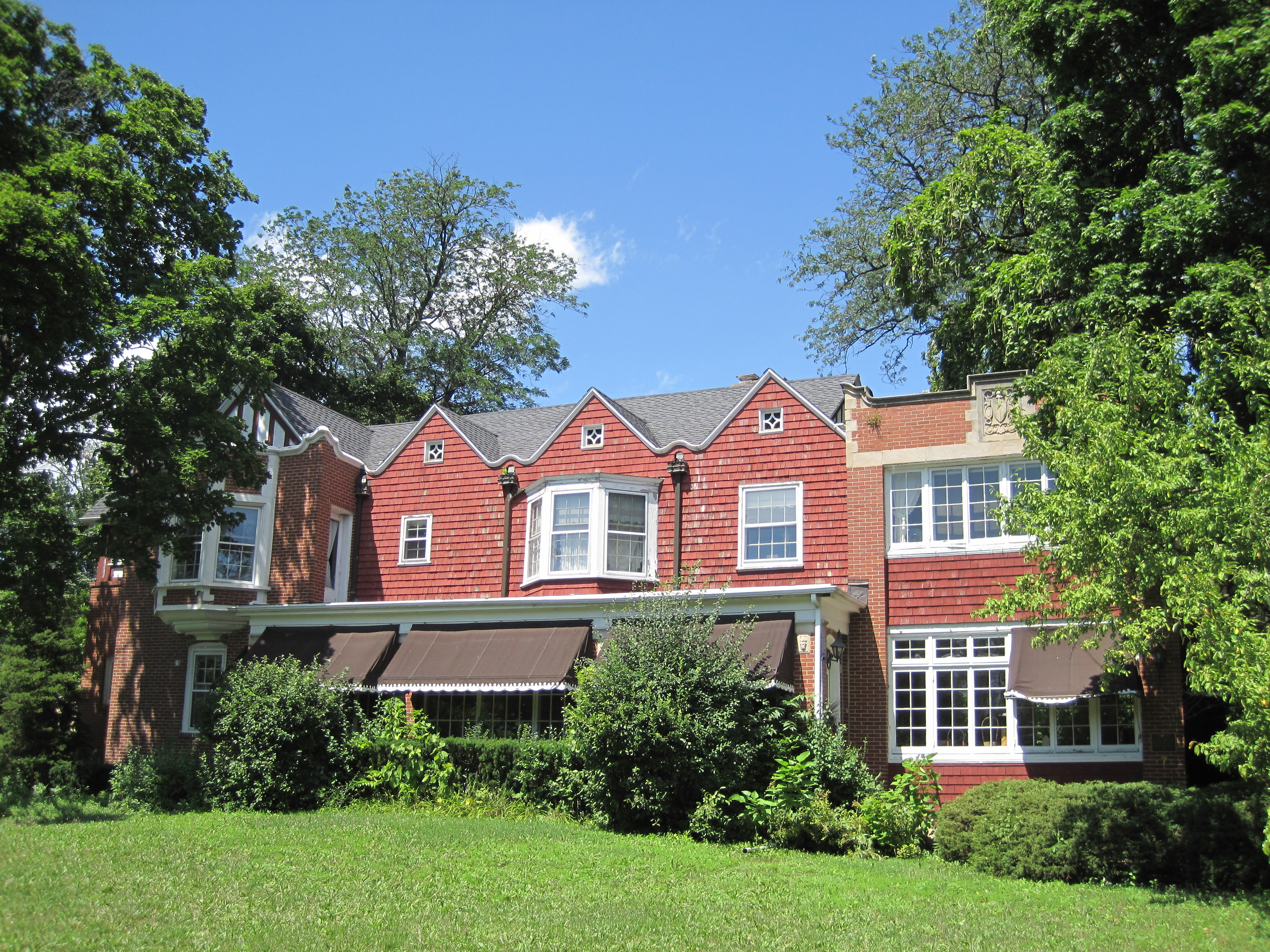

- Location within Chicago metropolitan area Location within Illinois Location within the United States
- Location: 7 Cottage Row, Midlothian, Illinois
- Coordinates: 41°37′58″N 87°45′03″W
- Area: less than one acre
- Built: 1899
- Architect: Howard Van Doren Shaw, N. Max Dunning
- Architectural style: Tudor Revival, Shingle Style, Arts & Crafts
- NRHP reference No.: 97000381
- Added to NRHP: May 2, 1997

The George R. Thorne House is a historic house at 7 Cottage Row in Midlothian, Illinois. The house was built in 1899 as a summer home for George R. Thorne, who co-founded Montgomery Ward and founded the adjacent Midlothian Country Club. Howard Van Doren Shaw, a Chicago architect known for designing large homes for wealthy and prominent people, designed the house. The house's exterior blends the Tudor Revival and Shingle styles, while its interior is inspired by the Arts and Crafts Movement. Its design features three shingled gables above the long front porch, a brick parapet in front of a half-timbered gable at the southwest corner, and a shingled block with brick piers and limestone detailing at the southeast corner. Architect N. Max Dunning renovated the house in 1914 to convert it to a year-round residence.

The house was added to the National Register of Historic Places on May 2, 1997.
