= Joshua P. Young House =

Historic house in Illinois, United States

- U.S. National Register of Historic Places
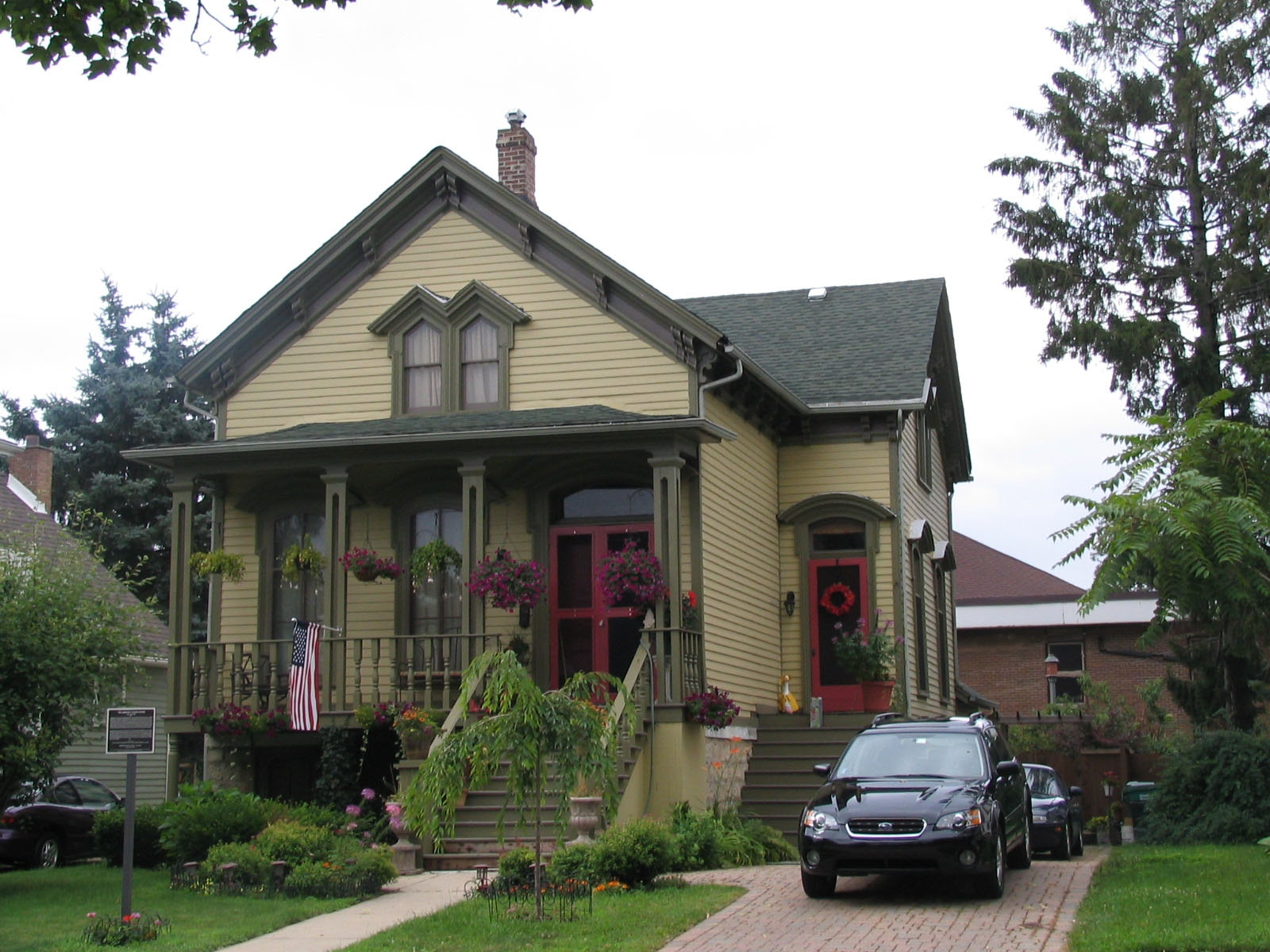

- Location within Chicago metropolitan area Location within Illinois Location within the United States
- Location: 2445 High St., Blue Island, Illinois
- Coordinates: 41°39′09″N 87°40′30″W
- Area: 0.1 acres (0.040 ha)
- Built: 1852
- Architectural style: Chicago Cottage
- NRHP reference No.: 82002525
- Added to NRHP: August 12, 1982

The Joshua P. Young House, also known as the McGee House, is a historic house at 2445 High Street in Blue Island, Illinois. The house was built in 1852 for land developer Joshua P. Young, who led the development of both Blue Island and many neighborhoods on Chicago's South Side. Young also helped bring the Rock Island Railroad through Blue Island and led the city's Board of Trustees for two years. The house has a Chicago Cottage plan, a style of balloon framing popular in mid-nineteenth century Chicago; as the style was banned in Chicago after the Great Chicago Fire burned through many of the homes, surviving examples are relatively uncommon. The house's detailing is eclectic, incorporating elements of Greek Revival, Italianate, and Gothic architecture.

The house was added to the National Register of Historic Places on August 12, 1982.
