= Grand Crossing Park =

- U.S. National Register of Historic Places
- U.S. Historic district
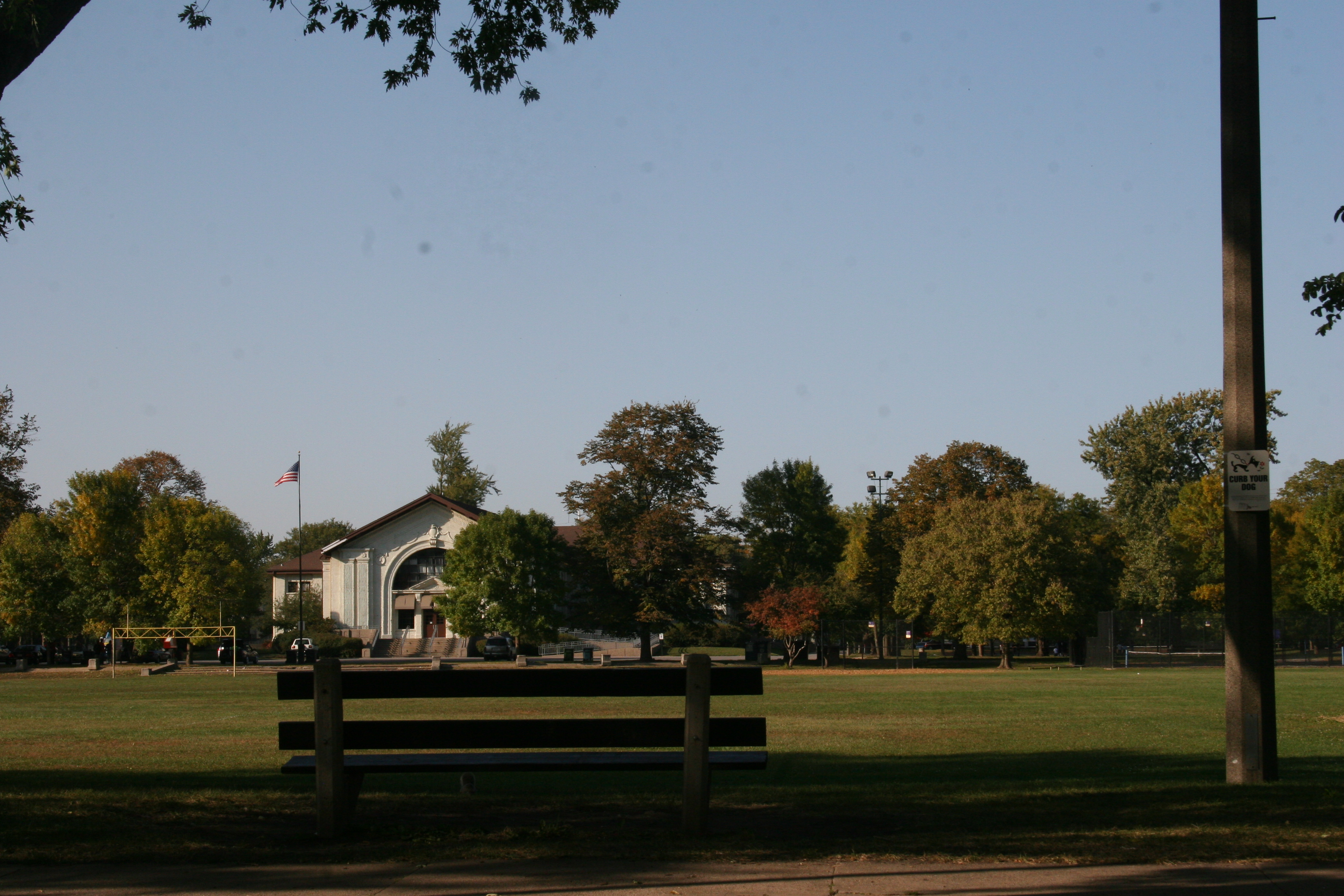

- Location within Chicago metropolitan area Location within Illinois Location within the United States
- Location: 7655 S. Ingleside Ave., Chicago, Illinois
- Coordinates: 41°45′25″N 87°36′01″W
- Area: 10.5 acres (4.2 ha)
- Architect: South Park Commission
- Architectural style: Beaux Arts
- MPS: Chicago Park District MPS
- NRHP reference No.: 06000678
- Added to NRHP: August 8, 2006

Grand Crossing Park is a public park at 7655 S. Ingleside Avenue in the Greater Grand Crossing neighborhood of Chicago, Illinois. Opened in 1915, the park was planned by the South Park Commission, which was responsible for adding several parks in dense, poor South Side neighborhoods. While the South Park Commission designed the park and its facilities in-house, its designs were heavily influenced by the work of the Olmsted Brothers and D. H. Burnham and Company in its earlier parks. The park originally included a Beaux-Arts fieldhouse, a swimming pool, outdoor gymnasiums, a baseball field, tennis courts, and running and walking paths. The fieldhouse includes indoor gymnasiums, meeting rooms, and a series of murals titled An Allegory of Recreation.

The park was added to the National Register of Historic Places on August 8, 2006. The park in 2010 added a $250k community build play lot, assisted by Friends of the Parks and Grand Crossing Park advisory council, CeCe Edwards President, Ted Seals, Parliamentarian.
