= Karl Vogt Building =

- U.S. National Register of Historic Places
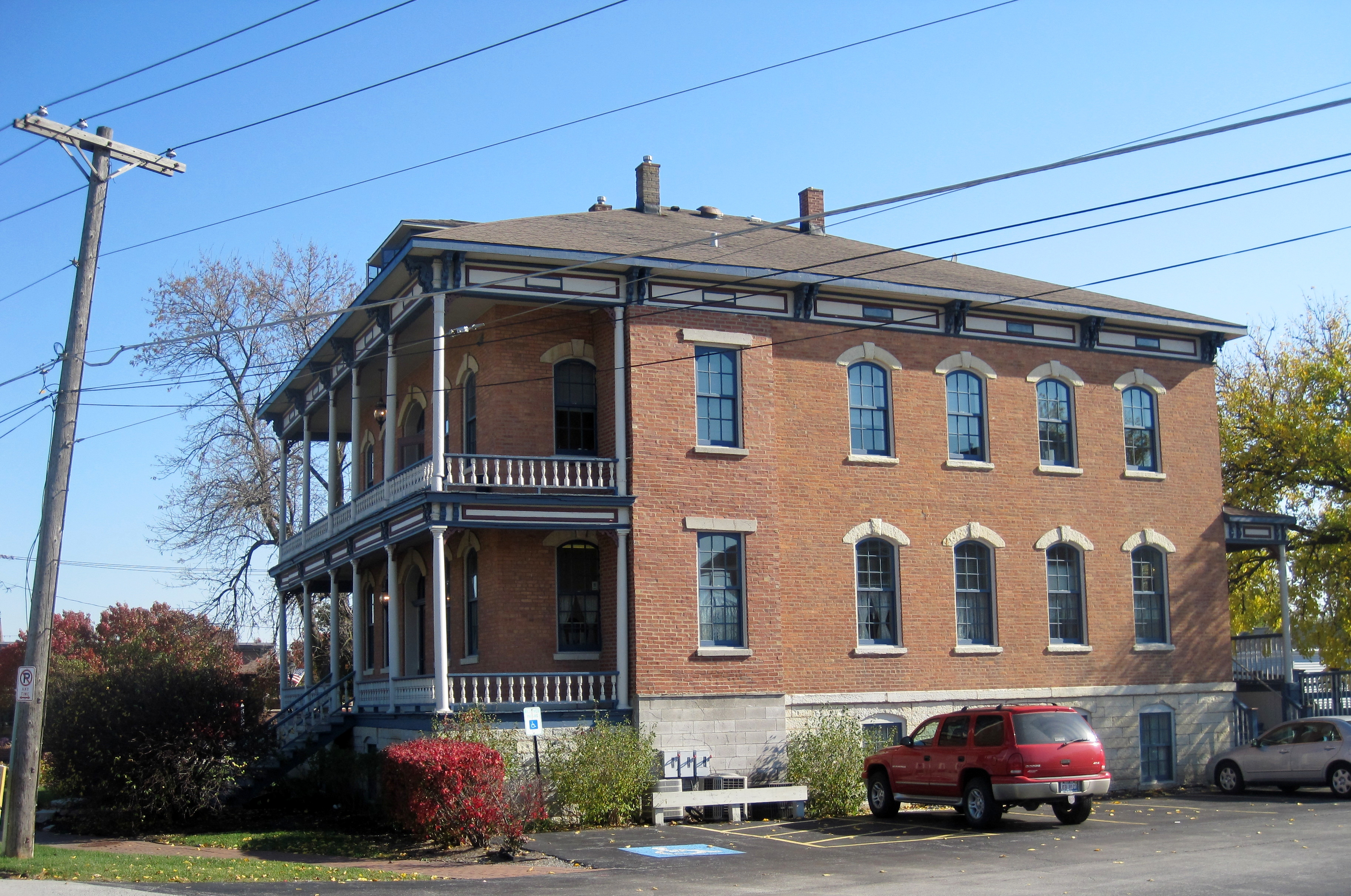
- Karl Vogt Building in 2010

- Location within Chicago metropolitan area Location within Illinois Location within the United States
- Location: 6811 Hickory St., Tinley Park, Illinois
- Coordinates: 41°34′29″N 87°47′04″W
- Area: 0.5 acres (0.20 ha)
- Built: 1865
- Architectural style: Italianate
- NRHP reference No.: 87002499
- Added to NRHP: January 21, 1988

The Karl Vogt Building is a historic building at 6811 Hickory Street in Tinley Park, Illinois.

Merchant and German immigrant Karl Vogt, the brother of future village president Henry Vogt, built the building in 1872. While Vogt expected the building would house workers on a planned Rock Island Railroad junction in Tinley Park, the junction was canceled after the Great Chicago Fire, and the building's construction costs bankrupted Vogt.

The building has an Italianate design, a popular choice in the mid-to-late nineteenth century; it is the only example of the style in Tinley Park. Its design includes a two-story porch with balustrades on each floor, tall windows with limestone lintels and keystones, and a cornice with ornamental brackets and moldings.

The building was added to the National Register of Historic Places on January 21, 1988.

In December 2023, after completely renovating the house, Banging Gavel Brews opened a brewery and restaurant in the building.

A historical marker (calling it the Carl Vogt Building) can be found near the building.

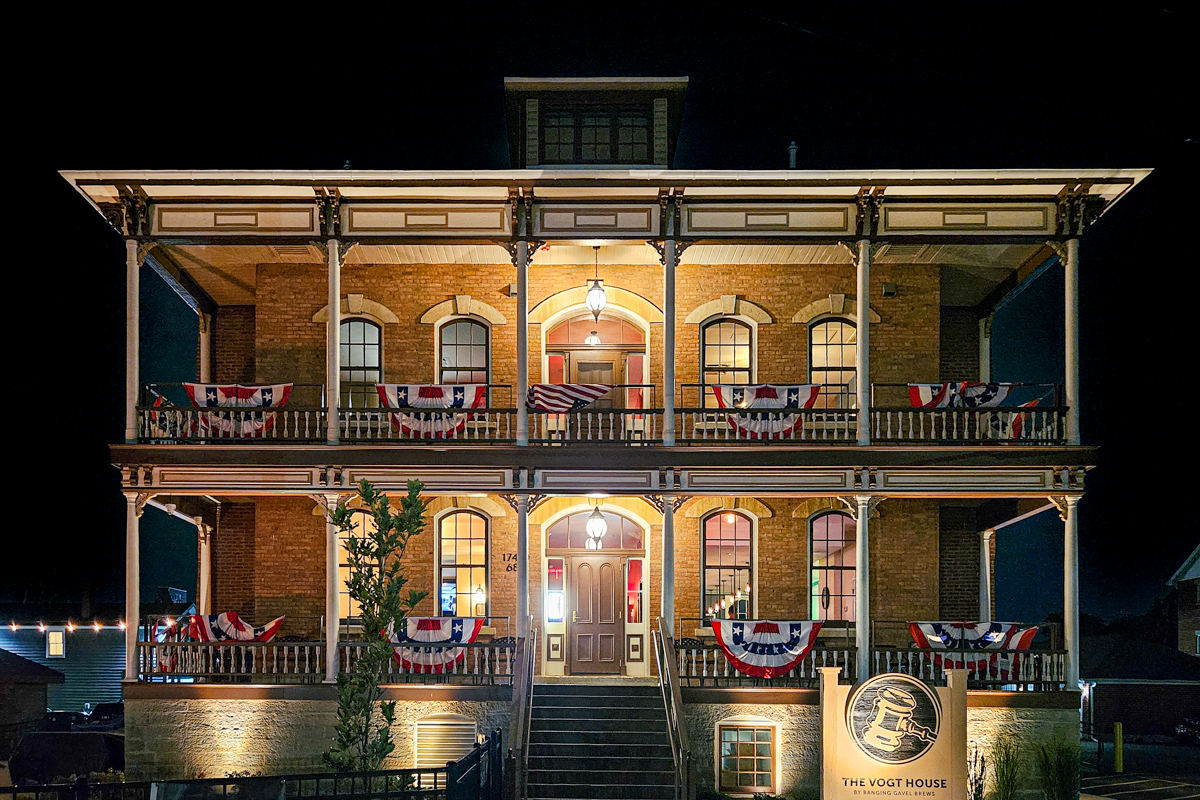
The Vogt House in 2024
