= Poinsettia Apartments =

- U.S. National Register of Historic Places
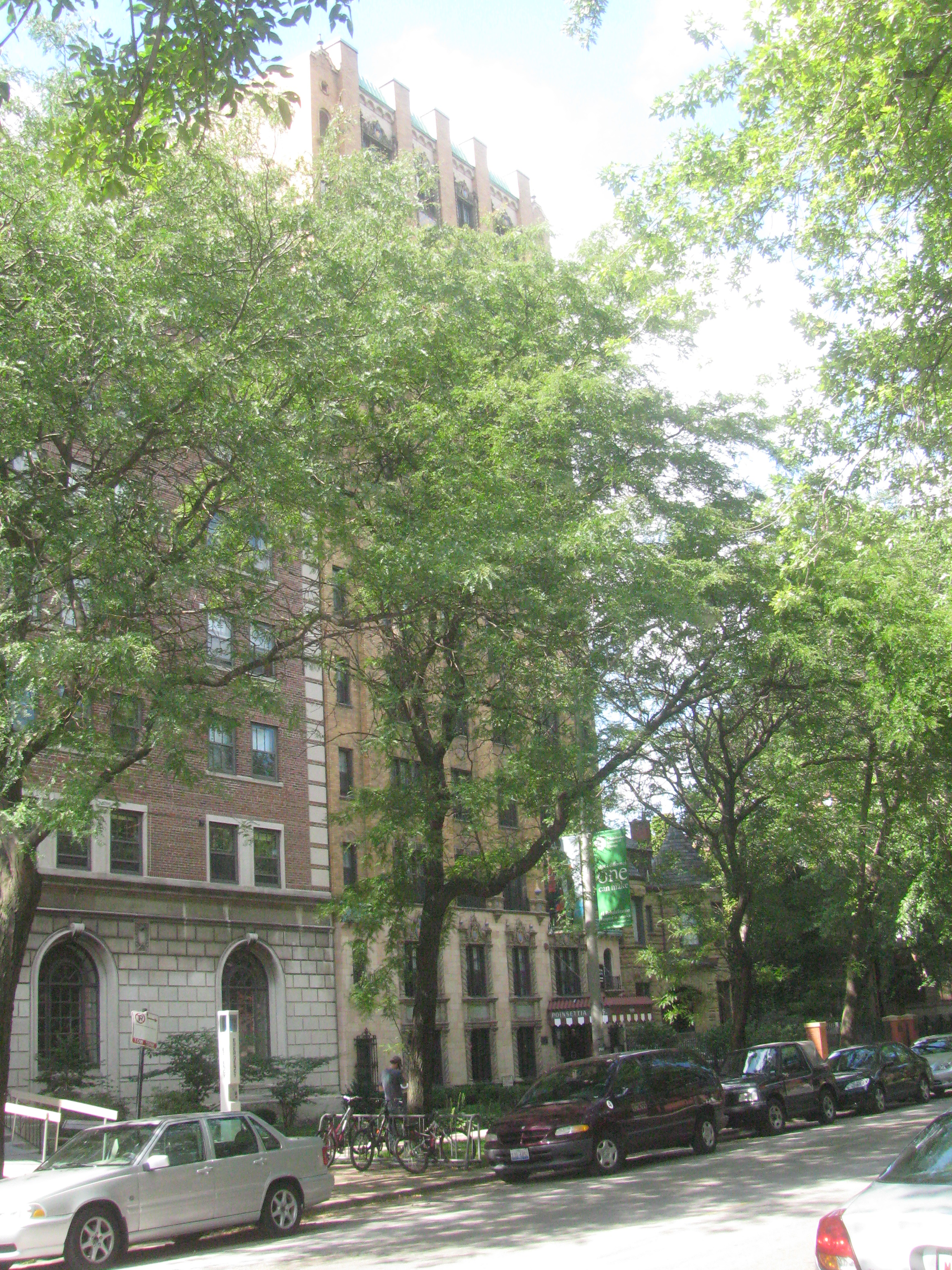

- Location within Chicago metropolitan area Location within Illinois Location within the United States
- Location: 5528 S. Hyde Park Blvd., Chicago, Illinois
- Coordinates: 41°47′39″N 87°35′03″W
- Area: 0.2 acres (0.081 ha)
- Built: 1929
- Architectural style: Spanish Colonial Revival
- MPS: Hyde Park Apartment Hotels TR
- NRHP reference No.: 86001199
- Added to NRHP: May 14, 1986

The Poinsettia Apartments (also spelled the Poinsetta Apartments) are an apartment hotel at 5528 S. Hyde Park Boulevard in the Hyde Park neighborhood of Chicago, Illinois. Built in 1929, the building was the last of several apartment hotels built in Hyde Park during a period of residential development in the late 1910s and 1920s. Apartment hotels were popular among wealthier workers in the city at the time, as they combined the amenities and prestige of hotels with the affordability of apartments. The Poinsettia Apartments were both the smallest of the Hyde Park apartment hotels and the only building designed in the Spanish Colonial Revival style. Its design features pilasters spanning the height of the building, terra cotta ornamentation, and decorative window surrounds on the first two floors.

The building was added to the National Register of Historic Places on May 14, 1986.
