= Hamilton Park (Chicago) =

- U.S. National Register of Historic Places
- U.S. Historic district
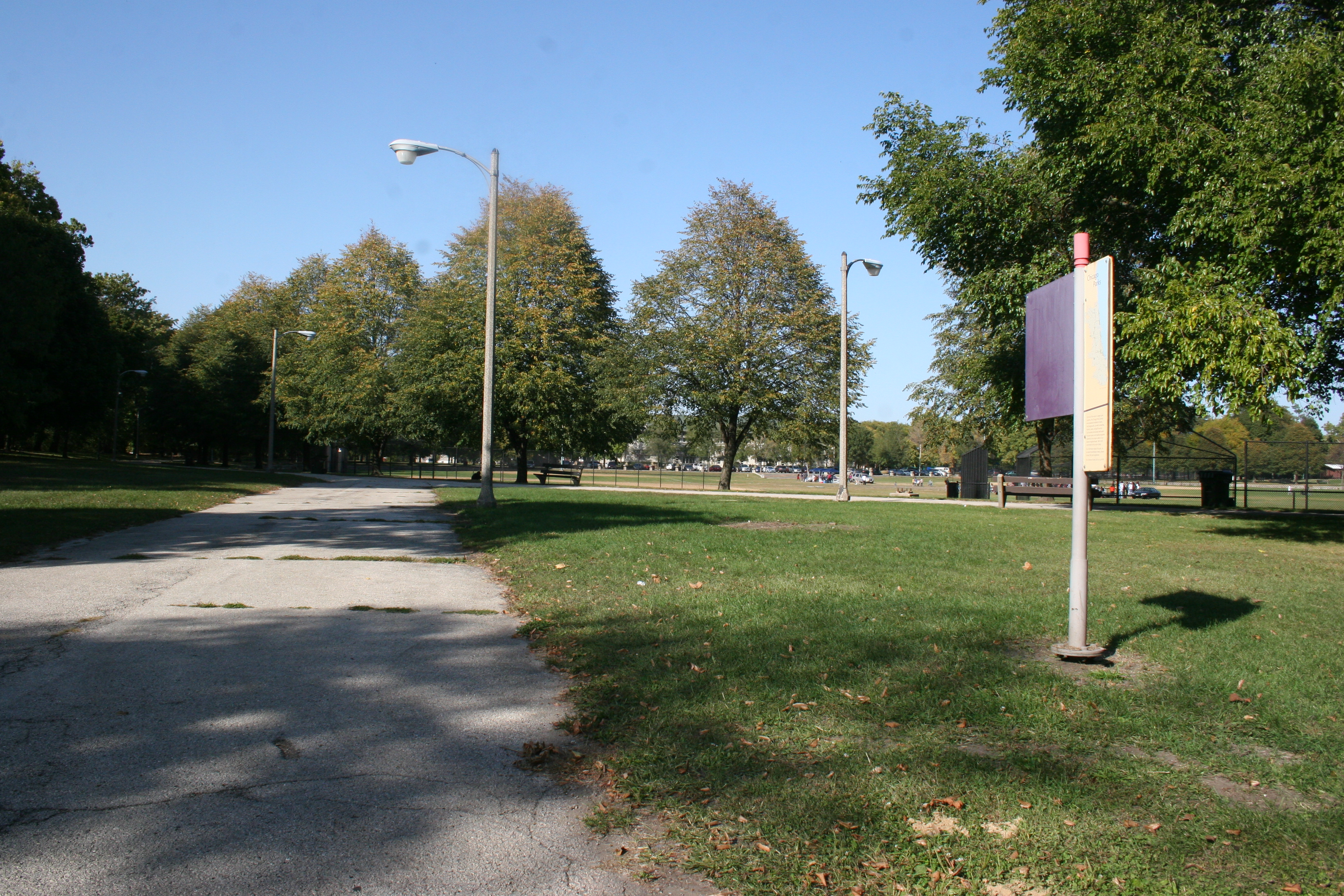

- Location within Chicago metropolitan area Location within Illinois Location within the United States
- Location: 513 W. 72nd St., Chicago, Illinois
- Coordinates: 41°45′42″N 87°38′14″W
- Area: 30 acres (12 ha)
- Architect: Olmsted Brothers, D. H. Burnham and Company
- Architectural style: Beaux Arts, Art Deco
- MPS: Chicago Park District MPS
- NRHP reference No.: 95000487
- Added to NRHP: April 20, 1995

Hamilton Park is a public park at 513 W. 72nd Street in the Englewood neighborhood of Chicago, Illinois. The park opened in 1904 as part of a plan led by the South Park Commission to add small neighborhood parks on Chicago's South Side. It was the first public park in Englewood. Landscape designers the Olmsted Brothers and architecture firm D. H. Burnham & Company collaborated on the park's design. The park opened with a fieldhouse, baseball field, wading pool, and walkways; within the decade, the designers added gymnasiums, a playground, and tennis courts. The fieldhouse has a Beaux-Arts design, and its inside features several murals of prominent figures in American history. The park was heavily used after it opened, and the fieldhouse in particular was booked so consistently that it was expanded in the 1920s.

The park was added to the National Register of Historic Places on April 20, 1995.
