= Raney House =

Raney House may refer to:

- Raney House (Rogers, Arkansas), listed on the National Register of Historic Places listings in Benton County, Arkansas
- David G. Raney House, Apalachicola, Florida, listed on the National Register of Historic Places in Florida

== See also ==
- Rainey House (disambiguation)
