= 2010 United States federal budget =

United States budget request

2010 Budget of the United States federal government
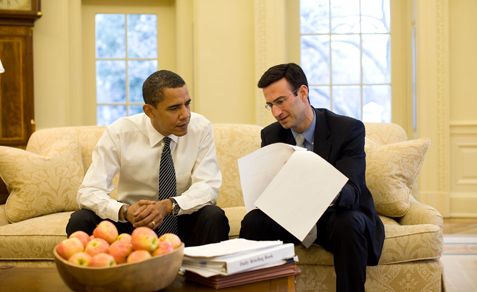
- President Barack Obama with OMB Director Peter Orszag.
- Submitted: February 26, 2009
- Submitted by: Barack Obama
- Submitted to: 111th Congress
- Country: United States
- Total revenue: $2.381 trillion (requested) $2.163 trillion (actual); 14.6% of GDP (actual)
- Total expenditures: $3.552 trillion (requested) $3.456 trillion (actual); 23.4% of GDP (actual)
- Deficit: $1.171 trillion (requested) $1.294 trillion (actual); 8.7% of GDP (actual)
- Debt: $13.53 trillion (at fiscal end); 91.4% of GDP
- GDP: $14.799 trillion
- Website: Office of Management and Budget

The United States Federal Budget for Fiscal Year 2010, titled A New Era of Responsibility: Renewing America's Promise, is a spending request by President Barack Obama to fund government operations for October 2009–September 2010. Figures shown in the spending request do not reflect the actual appropriations for Fiscal Year 2010, which must be authorized by Congress.

The government was initially funded through two temporary continuing resolutions. Final funding for the government was enacted as an omnibus spending bill, the Consolidated Appropriations Act, 2010, on December 16, 2009.

== Total spending ==
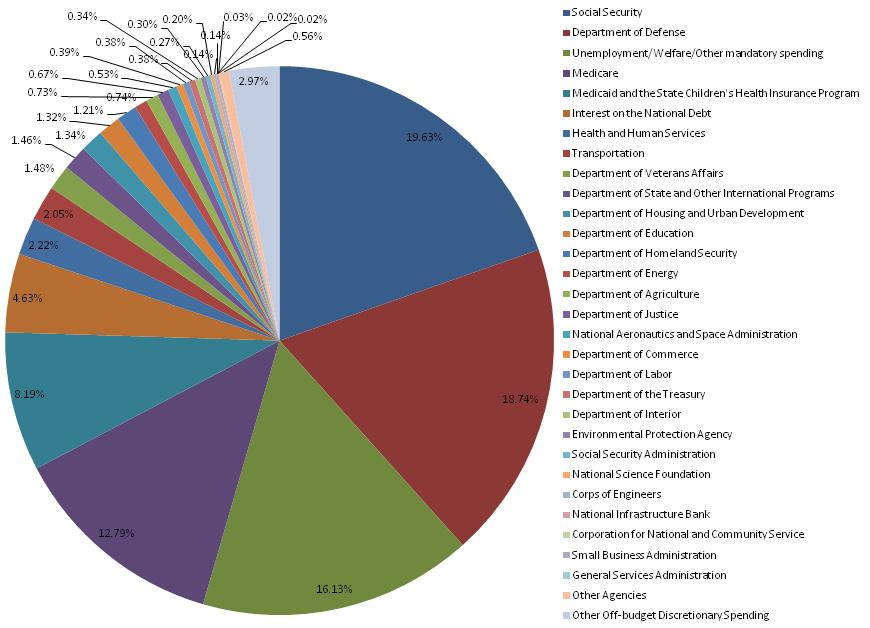
A pie chart representing spending by category for the US budget for 2010

Incoming President Barack Obama's budget request for FY 2010 totaled $3.55 trillion and was passed by Congress on April 29, 2009. Percentages in parentheses indicate percentage changes compared to FY 2009. A breakdown of Obama's budget request includes the following expenditures:

- Mandatory spending: $2.173 trillion (+14.9%)
  - $695 billion (+4.9%) – Social Security
  - $571 billion (+58.6%) – Other mandatory spending
  - $453 billion (+6.6%) – Medicare
  - $290 billion (+12.0%) – Medicaid
  - $164 billion (+18.0%) – Interest on National Debt

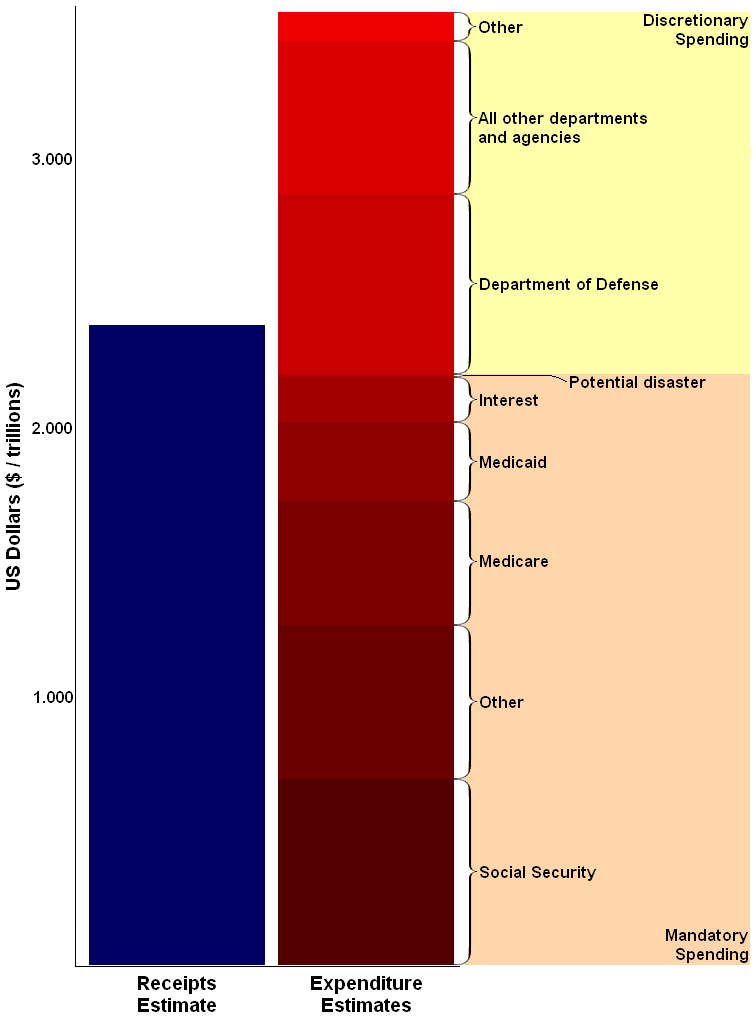
US receipt and expenditure estimates for fiscal year 2010.

- Discretionary spending: $1.378 trillion (+13.8%)
  - $663.7 billion (+12.7%) – Department of Defense (including Overseas Contingency Operations)
  - $78.7 billion (−1.7%) – Department of Health and Human Services
  - $72.5 billion (+2.8%) – Department of Transportation
  - $52.5 billion (+10.3%) – Department of Veterans Affairs
  - $51.7 billion (+40.9%) – Department of State and Other International Programs
  - $47.5 billion (+18.5%) – Department of Housing and Urban Development
  - $46.7 billion (+12.8%) – Department of Education
  - $42.7 billion (+1.2%) – Department of Homeland Security
  - $26.3 billion (−0.4%) – Department of Energy
  - $26.0 billion (+8.8%) – Department of Agriculture
  - $23.9 billion (−6.3%) – Department of Justice
  - $18.7 billion (+5.1%) – National Aeronautics and Space Administration
  - $13.8 billion (+48.4%) – Department of Commerce
  - $13.3 billion (+4.7%) – Department of Labor
  - $13.3 billion (+4.7%) – Department of the Treasury
  - $12.0 billion (+6.2%) – Department of the Interior
  - $10.5 billion (+34.6%) – Environmental Protection Agency
  - $9.7 billion (+10.2%) – Social Security Administration
  - $7.0 billion (+1.4%) – National Science Foundation
  - $5.1 billion (−3.8%) – Corps of Engineers
  - $5.0 billion (+100%-NA) – National Infrastructure Bank
  - $1.1 billion (+22.2%) – Corporation for National and Community Service
  - $0.7 billion (0.0%) – Small Business Administration
  - $0.6 billion (−14.3%) – General Services Administration
  - $0 billion (−100%-NA) – Troubled Asset Relief Program (TARP)
  - $0 billion (−100%-NA) – Financial stabilization efforts
  - $11 billion (+275%-NA) – Potential disaster costs
  - $19.8 billion (+3.7%) – Other Agencies
  - $105 billion – Other

== Total revenue ==
2010 Actual Receipts by Source
1. Individual income tax (43.2%)
2. Social Security/other payroll tax (40.4%)
3. Corporate income tax (7.30%)
4. Deposits of earnings and Federal Reserve System (3.60%)
5. Excise tax (3.40%)
6. Customs duties (1.10%)
7. Estate and gift taxes (0.80%)
8. Other miscellaneous receipts (0.80%)

(in billions of dollars):

Source	Requested	Enacted	Actual
Individual income tax	1,061	936	899
Corporate income tax	222	157	191
Social Security and other payroll tax	940	875	865
Excise tax	77	73	67
Estate and gift taxes	20	17	19
Customs duties	23	24	25
Deposits of earnings and Federal Reserve System	22	77	76
Allowance for jobs initiatives	-	−12	-
Other miscellaneous receipts	16	18	21
Total	2,381	2,165	2,163

== Deficit ==
The total deficit for fiscal year 2010 was $1.293 trillion.
