= Rainey House =

Rainey House may refer to:

in the United States (by state)

- Rainey's Cabin, College, Alaska, listed on the NRHP in Fairbanks North Star Borough, Alaska
- Matthew Rainey House, El Dorado, Arkansas, listed on the NRHP in Union County, Arkansas
- Gertrude Ma Pridgett Rainey House, Columbus, Georgia, listed on the NRHP in Muscogee County, Georgia
- Henry T. Rainey Farm, Carrollton, Illinois, listed on the NRHP in Greene County, Illinois
- Joseph H. Rainey House, Georgetown, South Carolina, listed on the NRHP in Georgetown County, South Carolina
- Rainey House (Franklin, Tennessee), listed on the National Register of Historic Places in Williamson County, Tennessee

== See also ==
- Raney House (disambiguation)
