= National Infrastructure Reinvestment Bank =

The creation of a National Infrastructure Reinvestment Bank was first proposed by United States Senator Christopher J. Dodd and Senator Chuck Hagel in 2007. However, several other iterations of a National Infrastructure Bank have been proposed and considered and it is likely that implementing legislation for the Bank will look quite different from that which was proposed in the original legislation.

Barack Obama backed the proposed legislation in February 2008 and repeated his call in September 2010, although he did not provide specifics about how the Bank should operate. In 2008, Obama suggested that the Bank would borrow US$60 billion of federal funding to invest in infrastructure over 10 years, while leveraging "up to $500 billion" of private investment. It would invest in high-speed trains to provide an alternative to air travel, energy efficiency, and clean energy, among other kinds of public infrastructure. According to Obama, the bank's "work will be determined by what will maximize our safety and security and ability to compete" and it would "create nearly two million new jobs", mainly in the construction industry. According to the text of the proposed legislation, funding for the bank would be taken from borrowed funds not to exceed one percent.

The Bank would complement existing federal programs to fund infrastructure, such as the Highway Trust Fund or State Revolving Funds. It is expected to invest primarily in surface transport infrastructure, which is likely to include highways and mass transit. Obama did not mention investments in water supply and sanitation as an area of activity for the new Bank. The American Water Works Association (AWWA) estimates that investment in water supply and sanitation in the United States will have to be "over $250 billion above current levels of spending in the next 20 to 30 years" to replace aging infrastructure. The original version of the bill expired with the 110th Congress; a different version of the bill was introduced into the 112th Congress by U.S. Representative Rosa L. DeLauro (D - Connecticut 3rd District) as H.R. 402.

== Summary of the proposed legislation ==
The original version of the proposed legislation was introduced in the United States Senate as Senate Bill 1926 (S. 1926). A similar bill has been introduced into the United States House of Representatives. The status of the bill can be tracked on THOMAS.

The original proposed legislation states that the "Bank" is actually "an independent establishment of the Federal Government, as defined in section 104 of Title 5, United States Code." As explained in 5 US Code 104, an independent establishment of the Federal Government is "(1) an establishment in the executive branch (other than the United States Postal Service or the Postal Regulatory Commission) which is not an Executive department, military department, Government corporation, or part thereof, or part of an independent establishment; and (2) the Government Accountability Office."

According to the proposed legislation, the "Bank" would be administratively similar to the Federal Deposit Insurance Corporation (FDIC). The "Bank" would have the power to conduct hearings, issue subpoenas, obtain information from any other federal agency, accept for funding any infrastructure project with a potential Federal commitment of $75 million or more, authority to determine the appropriate Federal share of spending for each project, to act as a centralized entity to provide financing for qualified infrastructure projects; to issue general purpose infrastructure bonds, and to provide direct subsidies to qualified infrastructure projects from amounts made available from the issuance of such bonds; to issue project-based infrastructure bonds for the financing of specific qualified infrastructure projects; to provide loan guarantees to State or local governments issuing debt to finance qualified infrastructure projects; to issue loans, at varying interest rates, including very low interest rates, to qualified project sponsors for qualified projects; to leverage resources and stimulate public and private investment in infrastructure; and to encourage States to create additional opportunities for the financing of infrastructure projects.

The revised bill "Makes the Bank's Board of Directors responsible for monitoring and overseeing energy, environmental, telecommunications, and transportation infrastructure projects. Authorizes the Board to: (1) issue public benefit bonds and provide direct subsidies to infrastructure projects; (2) borrow on the global capital market and lend to entities and commercial banks for funding infrastructure projects; and (3) purchase, pool, and sell infrastructure-related loans and securities on such market. Requires the Board to establish criteria for determining project eligibility for financial assistance under this Act."

Under the 2011 bill, the bank’s board members would be appointed by the president and confirmed by the Senate. This led to some concerns about the bank being subject to undue political influence. The 2011 bill, along with the rest of President Obama’s $447 billion American Jobs Act of 2011, in which the bill was embedded was not passed.

== Update ==
Since that time, development of an institution to promote investment in infrastructure has remained a goal of many elected officials in the U.S. Investment in U.S. infrastructure was a significant issue in the 2016 U.S. presidential campaign. Hillary Clinton proposed an infrastructure improvement program of $275 billion; Donald Trump set a goal of $550 billion, pledging to "build the next generation of roads, bridges, railways, tunnels, seaports, and airports."

In 2017 Oregon Democrat Peter DeFazio proposed $500 billion in federal bonds, in H.R. 1664, the “Investing in America: A Penny for Progress Act but it was not approved and died in Congress.

Also in 2017, New York Republican John Faso introduced a bill, H.R. 3977: The Infrastructure Bank for America Act of 2017, which would have established a federally chartered bank to invest in infrastructure projects throughout the country. The legislation would have created a privately funded and managed entity to attract private investors and lend to worthy projects across the nation.

H.R. 1664 and H.R. 3977 both expired without passage in January 2017 upon the termination of the 115th Session of Congress.

On January 17, 2019, Legislation H. R. 658 was introduced by Rep. Rosa DeLauro to establish the National Infrastructure Development Bank, which would have been a federal government corporation, and similar to previous proposals, its board of directors would have been appointed by the President in consultation with and approval of the Senate.

On June 15, 2020, Legislation H.R. 7231 was introduced in the U.S. House of Representatives to create the Infrastructure Bank for America. The lead sponsors are Rep. Daniel Webster (R, FL-11), Rep. Dan Meuser (R, PA-9), Rep. Doug LaMalfa (R, CA-1), and Rep. Tom Reed (R, NY-23). If this bill passes, the new Infrastructure Bank for America will be a trillion-dollar wholesale bank designed to invest in U.S. infrastructure, modeled after the Federal Home Loan Banks (FHLB).

== See also ==
- Transportation in the United States
- National Highway System
- Toll road
- Energy policy of the United States
- Water supply and sanitation in the United States
