= Guy L. Shaw =

American politician and farmer (1881–1950)

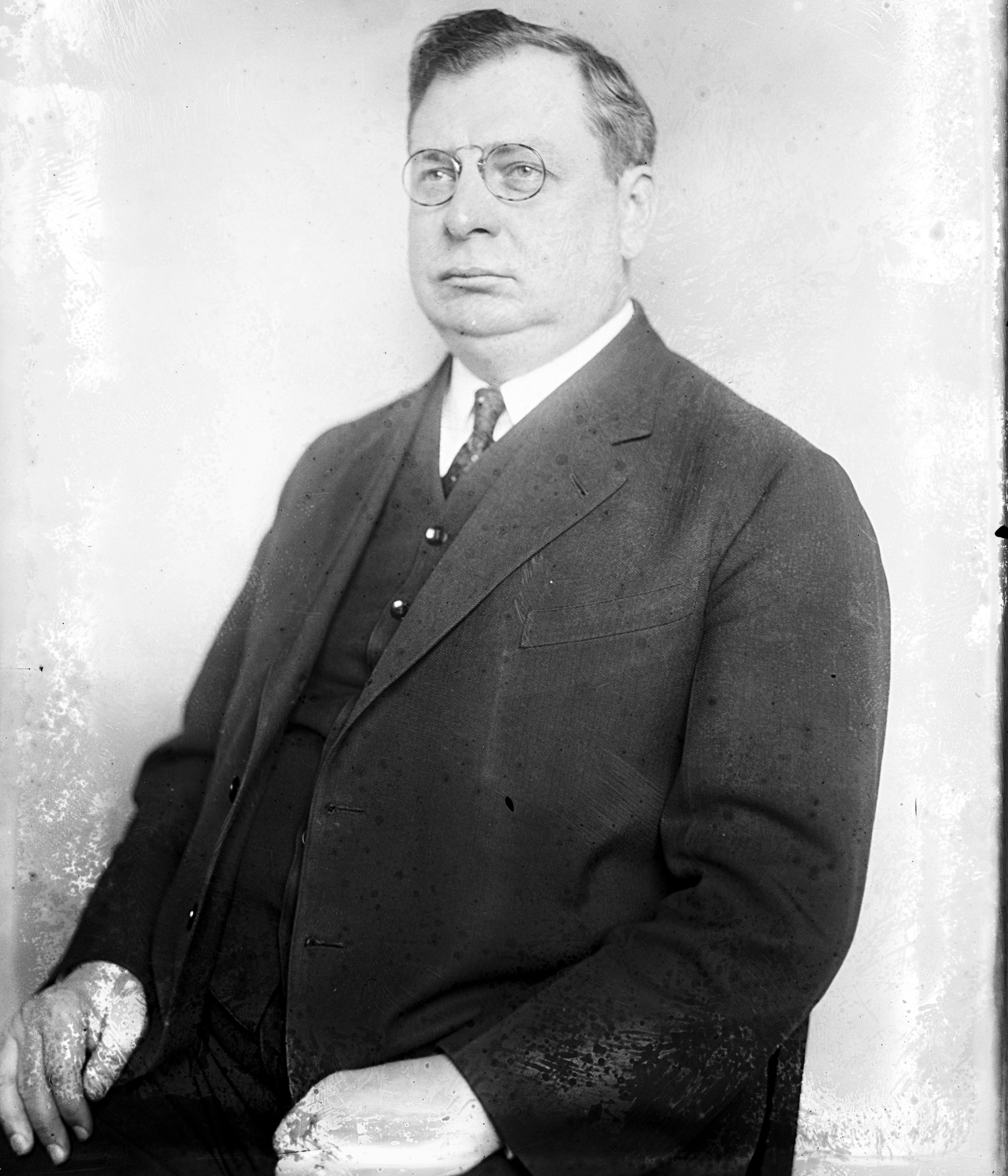
- Shaw, between 1921 and 1922

Member of the U.S. House of Representatives from Illinois's 20th district
- In office March 4, 1921 – March 3, 1923
- Preceded by: Henry Thomas Rainey
- Succeeded by: Henry Thomas Rainey

Personal details
- Born: Guy Loren Shaw; May 16, 1881 Summer Hill, Illinois, US
- Died: May 19, 1950 (aged 69) Normal, Illinois, US
- Resting place: Evergreen Cemetery
- Party: Republican
- Occupation: Politician, farmer

Guy Loren Shaw (May 16, 1881 – May 19, 1950) was an American politician and farmer. A Republican, he was a member of the United States House of Representatives from Illinois.

== Biography ==
Shaw was born on May 16, 1881, on a farm near Summer Hill, Illinois, the son of Fred Shaw and Clara (née Sanderson) Shaw. Educated at public schools, he studied at the College of Agricultural, Consumer and Environmental Sciences. He worked as a farmer and helped develop the Illinois River floodplain. During World War I, he volunteered to donate the crops he grew in Cass and Schuyler Counties to the United States Department of Agriculture.

Shaw was a Republican. He was a delegate to the 1920 and 1922 Illinois Constitutional Convention, from the 30th district. He was a member of the United States House of Representatives from March 4, 1921, to March 3, 1923, representing Illinois's 20th district. While serving, he was a member of the Committees on Agriculture, on Industrial Affairs, on Labor, and on Qualifications and Election of Delegates. He lost the following election, then lost the election in 1924. Politically, he was conservative.

After serving in Congress, Shaw moved to Normal. He worked as a real estate agent in Beardstown, Normal, and Urbana, and also returned to farming. On September 14, 1910, he married Bessie Dillon, with whom he had two children. He was Christian, as well as a member of the Freemasons, the Scottish Rite, and the Shriners. He died on May 19, 1950, aged 69, in Normal, and was buried at the Evergreen Cemetery, in Bloomington.

U.S. House of Representatives
Preceded by Henry T. Rainey	Member of the U.S. House of Representatives from Illinois's 20th congressional district March 4, 1921 - March 3, 1923	Succeeded by Henry T. Rainey
