= List of United States Congresses =

This is a list of the several United States Congresses, since their beginning in 1789, including their beginnings, endings, and the dates of their individual sessions. Each elected bicameral Congress (of the two chambers of the Senate and the House of Representatives) lasts for two years and begins on January 3 of odd-numbered years.

Before the Twentieth Amendment to the United States Constitution (ratified January 23, 1933), which moved and fixed new Congressional dates, on which an American Congress began and ended, designated from the original provisions of the Constitution of 1787, was previously either March 3 or March 4, (in tandem then with dates of presidential inaugurations every fourth year which were moved by the same constitutional amendment to January 20).

== List of previous Congresses ==
Congress	Session	Session dates	House		Senate		President	Trifecta
Congress	Session	Session dates	House control	Speaker	Senate control	Vice President	President	Trifecta
1st Congress	Start	March 4, 1789	Pro-Administration	Frederick Muhlenberg	Pro-Administration	John Adams	George Washington	Yes
1st Congress	1st session	March 4, 1789 – September 29, 1789	Pro-Administration	Frederick Muhlenberg	Pro-Administration	John Adams	George Washington	Yes
1st Congress	2nd session	January 4, 1790 – August 12, 1790	Pro-Administration	Frederick Muhlenberg	Pro-Administration	John Adams	George Washington	Yes
1st Congress	3rd session	December 6, 1790 – March 3, 1791	Pro-Administration	Frederick Muhlenberg	Pro-Administration	John Adams	George Washington	Yes
1st Congress	End	March 3, 1791	Pro-Administration	Frederick Muhlenberg	Pro-Administration	John Adams	George Washington	Yes
2nd Congress	Start	March 4, 1791	Pro-Administration	Jonathan Trumbull Jr.	Pro-Administration	John Adams	George Washington	Yes
2nd Congress	Special session	March 4, 1791 – March 4, 1791	Pro-Administration	Jonathan Trumbull Jr.	Pro-Administration	John Adams	George Washington	Yes
2nd Congress	1st session	October 24, 1791 – May 8, 1792	Pro-Administration	Jonathan Trumbull Jr.	Pro-Administration	John Adams	George Washington	Yes
2nd Congress	2nd session	November 5, 1792 – March 2, 1793	Pro-Administration	Jonathan Trumbull Jr.	Pro-Administration	John Adams	George Washington	Yes
2nd Congress	End	March 3, 1793	Pro-Administration	Jonathan Trumbull Jr.	Pro-Administration	John Adams	George Washington	Yes
3rd Congress	Start	March 4, 1793	Anti-Administration	Frederick Muhlenberg	Pro-Administration	John Adams	George Washington	No
3rd Congress	Special session	March 4, 1793 – March 4, 1793	Anti-Administration	Frederick Muhlenberg	Pro-Administration	John Adams	George Washington	No
3rd Congress	1st session	December 2, 1793 – June 9, 1794	Anti-Administration	Frederick Muhlenberg	Pro-Administration	John Adams	George Washington	No
3rd Congress	2nd session	November 3, 1794 – March 3, 1795	Anti-Administration	Frederick Muhlenberg	Pro-Administration	John Adams	George Washington	No
3rd Congress	End	March 3, 1795	Anti-Administration	Frederick Muhlenberg	Pro-Administration	John Adams	George Washington	No
4th Congress	Start	March 4, 1795	Democratic-Republican	Jonathan Dayton	Federalist	John Adams	George Washington	No
4th Congress	Special session	June 8, 1795 – June 26, 1795	Democratic-Republican	Jonathan Dayton	Federalist	John Adams	George Washington	No
4th Congress	1st session	December 7, 1795 – June 1, 1796	Democratic-Republican	Jonathan Dayton	Federalist	John Adams	George Washington	No
4th Congress	2nd session	December 5, 1796 – March 3, 1797	Democratic-Republican	Jonathan Dayton	Federalist	John Adams	George Washington	No
4th Congress	End	March 3, 1797	Democratic-Republican	Jonathan Dayton	Federalist	John Adams	George Washington	No
5th Congress	Start	March 4, 1797	Federalist	Jonathan Dayton	Federalist	Thomas Jefferson	John Adams	Yes
5th Congress	Special session	March 4, 1797 – March 4, 1797	Federalist	Jonathan Dayton	Federalist	Thomas Jefferson	John Adams	Yes
5th Congress	1st session	May 15, 1797 – July 10, 1797	Federalist	Jonathan Dayton	Federalist	Thomas Jefferson	John Adams	Yes
5th Congress	2nd session	November 13, 1797 – July 16, 1798	Federalist	Jonathan Dayton	Federalist	Thomas Jefferson	John Adams	Yes
5th Congress	Special session	July 17, 1798 – July 19, 1798	Federalist	Jonathan Dayton	Federalist	Thomas Jefferson	John Adams	Yes
5th Congress	3rd session	December 3, 1798 – March 3, 1799	Federalist	Jonathan Dayton	Federalist	Thomas Jefferson	John Adams	Yes
5th Congress	End	March 3, 1799	Federalist	Jonathan Dayton	Federalist	Thomas Jefferson	John Adams	Yes
6th Congress	Start	March 4, 1799	Federalist	Theodore Sedgwick	Federalist	Thomas Jefferson	John Adams	Yes
6th Congress	1st session	December 2, 1799 – May 14, 1800	Federalist	Theodore Sedgwick	Federalist	Thomas Jefferson	John Adams	Yes
6th Congress	2nd session	November 17, 1800 – March 3, 1801	Federalist	Theodore Sedgwick	Federalist	Thomas Jefferson	John Adams	Yes
6th Congress	End	March 3, 1801	Federalist	Theodore Sedgwick	Federalist	Thomas Jefferson	John Adams	Yes
7th Congress	Start	March 4, 1801	Democratic-Republican	Nathaniel Macon	Democratic-Republican	Aaron Burr	Thomas Jefferson	No/Yes
7th Congress	Special session	March 4, 1801 – March 5, 1801	Democratic-Republican	Nathaniel Macon	Democratic-Republican	Aaron Burr	Thomas Jefferson	No/Yes
7th Congress	1st session	December 7, 1801 – May 3, 1802	Democratic-Republican	Nathaniel Macon	Democratic-Republican	Aaron Burr	Thomas Jefferson	No/Yes
7th Congress	2nd session	December 6, 1802 – March 3, 1803	Democratic-Republican	Nathaniel Macon	Democratic-Republican	Aaron Burr	Thomas Jefferson	No/Yes
7th Congress	End	March 3, 1803	Democratic-Republican	Nathaniel Macon	Democratic-Republican	Aaron Burr	Thomas Jefferson	No/Yes
8th Congress	Start	March 4, 1803	Democratic-Republican	Nathaniel Macon	Democratic-Republican	Aaron Burr	Thomas Jefferson	Yes
8th Congress	1st session	October 17, 1803 – March 27, 1804	Democratic-Republican	Nathaniel Macon	Democratic-Republican	Aaron Burr	Thomas Jefferson	Yes
8th Congress	2nd session	November 5, 1804 – March 3, 1805	Democratic-Republican	Nathaniel Macon	Democratic-Republican	Aaron Burr	Thomas Jefferson	Yes
8th Congress	End	March 3, 1805	Democratic-Republican	Nathaniel Macon	Democratic-Republican	Aaron Burr	Thomas Jefferson	Yes
9th Congress	Start	March 4, 1805	Democratic-Republican	Nathaniel Macon	Democratic-Republican	George Clinton	Thomas Jefferson	Yes
9th Congress	1st session	December 2, 1805 – April 21, 1806	Democratic-Republican	Nathaniel Macon	Democratic-Republican	George Clinton	Thomas Jefferson	Yes
9th Congress	2nd session	December 1, 1806 – March 3, 1807	Democratic-Republican	Nathaniel Macon	Democratic-Republican	George Clinton	Thomas Jefferson	Yes
9th Congress	End	March 3, 1807	Democratic-Republican	Nathaniel Macon	Democratic-Republican	George Clinton	Thomas Jefferson	Yes
10th Congress	Start	March 4, 1807	Democratic-Republican	Joseph Bradley Varnum	Democratic-Republican	George Clinton	Thomas Jefferson	Yes
10th Congress	1st session	October 26, 1807 – April 25, 1808	Democratic-Republican	Joseph Bradley Varnum	Democratic-Republican	George Clinton	Thomas Jefferson	Yes
10th Congress	2nd session	November 7, 1808 – March 3, 1809	Democratic-Republican	Joseph Bradley Varnum	Democratic-Republican	George Clinton	Thomas Jefferson	Yes
10th Congress	End	March 3, 1809	Democratic-Republican	Joseph Bradley Varnum	Democratic-Republican	George Clinton	Thomas Jefferson	Yes
11th Congress	Start	March 4, 1809	Democratic-Republican	Joseph Bradley Varnum	Democratic-Republican	George Clinton	Thomas Jefferson	Yes
11th Congress	Special session	March 4, 1809 – March 7, 1809	Democratic-Republican	Joseph Bradley Varnum	Democratic-Republican	George Clinton	James Madison	Yes
11th Congress	1st session	May 22, 1809 – June 28, 1809	Democratic-Republican	Joseph Bradley Varnum	Democratic-Republican	George Clinton	James Madison	Yes
11th Congress	2nd session	November 27, 1809 – May 1, 1810	Democratic-Republican	Joseph Bradley Varnum	Democratic-Republican	George Clinton	James Madison	Yes
11th Congress	3rd session	December 3, 1810 – March 3, 1811	Democratic-Republican	Joseph Bradley Varnum	Democratic-Republican	George Clinton	James Madison	Yes
11th Congress	End	March 3, 1811	Democratic-Republican	Joseph Bradley Varnum	Democratic-Republican	George Clinton	James Madison	Yes
12th Congress	Start	March 4, 1811	Democratic-Republican	Henry Clay	Democratic-Republican	George Clinton	James Madison	Yes
12th Congress	1st session	November 4, 1811 – July 6, 1812	Democratic-Republican	Henry Clay	Democratic-Republican	Vacant (Note: Vacancy due to Death)	James Madison	Yes
12th Congress	2nd session	November 2, 1812 – March 3, 1813	Democratic-Republican	Henry Clay	Democratic-Republican	Vacant	James Madison	Yes
12th Congress	End	March 3, 1813	Democratic-Republican	Henry Clay	Democratic-Republican	Vacant	James Madison	Yes
13th Congress	Start	March 4, 1813	Democratic-Republican	Henry Clay	Democratic-Republican	Elbridge Gerry	James Madison	Yes
13th Congress	1st session	May 24, 1813 – August 2, 1813	Democratic-Republican	Henry Clay	Democratic-Republican	Vacant (Note: Vacancy due to Death)	James Madison	Yes
13th Congress	2nd session	December 6, 1813 – April 18, 1814	Democratic-Republican	Henry Clay	Democratic-Republican	Vacant	James Madison	Yes
13th Congress	3rd session	September 19, 1814 – March 3, 1815	Democratic-Republican	Langdon Cheves	Democratic-Republican	Vacant	James Madison	Yes
13th Congress	End	March 3, 1815	Democratic-Republican	Langdon Cheves	Democratic-Republican	Vacant	James Madison	Yes
14th Congress	Start	March 4, 1815	Democratic-Republican	Henry Clay (Note: Resigned from Office and left Congress)	Democratic-Republican	Vacant	James Madison	Yes
14th Congress	1st session	December 4, 1815 – April 30, 1816	Democratic-Republican	Henry Clay	Democratic-Republican	Vacant	James Madison	Yes
14th Congress	2nd session	December 2, 1816 – March 3, 1817	Democratic-Republican	Henry Clay	Democratic-Republican	Vacant	James Madison	Yes
14th Congress	End	March 3, 1817	Democratic-Republican	Henry Clay	Democratic-Republican	Vacant	James Madison	Yes
15th Congress	Start	March 4, 1817	Democratic-Republican	Henry Clay	Democratic-Republican	Daniel D. Tompkins	James Monroe	Yes
15th Congress	Special session	March 4, 1817 – March 6, 1817	Democratic-Republican	Henry Clay	Democratic-Republican	Daniel D. Tompkins	James Monroe	Yes
15th Congress	1st session	December 1, 1817 – April 20, 1818	Democratic-Republican	Henry Clay	Democratic-Republican	Daniel D. Tompkins	James Monroe	Yes
15th Congress	2nd session	November 16, 1818 – March 3, 1819	Democratic-Republican	Henry Clay	Democratic-Republican	Daniel D. Tompkins	James Monroe	Yes
15th Congress	End	March 3, 1819	Democratic-Republican	Henry Clay	Democratic-Republican	Daniel D. Tompkins	James Monroe	Yes
16th Congress	Start	March 4, 1819	Democratic-Republican	Henry Clay	Democratic-Republican	Daniel D. Tompkins	James Monroe	Yes
16th Congress	1st session	December 6, 1819 – May 15, 1820	Democratic-Republican	Henry Clay	Democratic-Republican	Daniel D. Tompkins	James Monroe	Yes
16th Congress	2nd session	November 13, 1820 – March 3, 1821	Democratic-Republican	John W. Taylor	Democratic-Republican	Daniel D. Tompkins	James Monroe	Yes
16th Congress	End	March 3, 1821	Democratic-Republican	John W. Taylor	Democratic-Republican	Daniel D. Tompkins	James Monroe	Yes
17th Congress	Start	March 4, 1821	Democratic-Republican	Philip P. Barbour	Democratic-Republican	Daniel D. Tompkins	James Monroe	Yes
17th Congress	1st session	December 3, 1821 – May 8, 1822	Democratic-Republican	Philip P. Barbour	Democratic-Republican	Daniel D. Tompkins	James Monroe	Yes
17th Congress	2nd session	December 2, 1822 – March 3, 1823	Democratic-Republican	Philip P. Barbour	Democratic-Republican	Daniel D. Tompkins	James Monroe	Yes
17th Congress	End	March 3, 1823	Democratic-Republican	Philip P. Barbour	Democratic-Republican	Daniel D. Tompkins	James Monroe	Yes
18th Congress	Start	March 4, 1823	Democratic-Republican	Henry Clay (Note: Resigned from Office and left Congress)	Democratic-Republican	Daniel D. Tompkins	James Monroe	Yes
18th Congress	1st session	December 1, 1823 – May 27, 1824	Democratic-Republican	Henry Clay	Democratic-Republican	Daniel D. Tompkins	James Monroe	Yes
18th Congress	2nd session	December 6, 1824 – March 3, 1825	Democratic-Republican	Henry Clay	Democratic-Republican	Daniel D. Tompkins	James Monroe	Yes
18th Congress	End	March 3, 1825	Democratic-Republican	Henry Clay	Democratic-Republican	Daniel D. Tompkins	James Monroe	Yes
19th Congress	Start	March 4, 1825	Anti-Jacksonian	John W. Taylor	Jacksonian	John C. Calhoun	John Quincy Adams	No
19th Congress	Special session	March 4, 1825 – March 9, 1825	Anti-Jacksonian	John W. Taylor	Jacksonian	John C. Calhoun	John Quincy Adams	No
19th Congress	1st session	December 5, 1825 – May 22, 1826	Anti-Jacksonian	John W. Taylor	Jacksonian	John C. Calhoun	John Quincy Adams	No
19th Congress	2nd session	December 4, 1826 – March 3, 1827	Anti-Jacksonian	John W. Taylor	Jacksonian	John C. Calhoun	John Quincy Adams	No
19th Congress	End	March 3, 1827	Anti-Jacksonian	John W. Taylor	Jacksonian	John C. Calhoun	John Quincy Adams	No
20th Congress	Start	March 4, 1827	Jacksonian	Andrew Stevenson (Note: Resigned from Office and left Congress)	Jacksonian	John C. Calhoun	John Quincy Adams	No
20th Congress	1st session	December 3, 1827 – May 26, 1828	Jacksonian	Andrew Stevenson	Jacksonian	John C. Calhoun	John Quincy Adams	No
20th Congress	2nd session	December 1, 1828 – March 3, 1829	Jacksonian	Andrew Stevenson	Jacksonian	John C. Calhoun	John Quincy Adams	No
20th Congress	End	March 3, 1829	Jacksonian	Andrew Stevenson	Jacksonian	John C. Calhoun	John Quincy Adams	No
21st Congress	Start	March 4, 1829	Jacksonian	Andrew Stevenson	Jacksonian	John C. Calhoun	Andrew Jackson	Yes
21st Congress	Special session	March 4, 1829 – March 17, 1829	Jacksonian	Andrew Stevenson	Jacksonian	Vacant (Note: Vacancy due to Resignation)	Andrew Jackson	Yes
21st Congress	1st session	December 7, 1829 – May 31, 1830	Jacksonian	Andrew Stevenson	Jacksonian	Vacant	Andrew Jackson	Yes
21st Congress	2nd session	December 6, 1830 – March 3, 1831	Jacksonian	Andrew Stevenson	Jacksonian	Vacant	Andrew Jackson	Yes
21st Congress	End	March 3, 1831	Jacksonian	Andrew Stevenson	Jacksonian	Vacant	Andrew Jackson	Yes
22nd Congress	Start	March 4, 1831	Jacksonian	Andrew Stevenson	Jacksonian	Vacant	Andrew Jackson	Yes
22nd Congress	1st session	December 5, 1831 – July 16, 1832	Jacksonian	Andrew Stevenson	Jacksonian	Vacant	Andrew Jackson	Yes
22nd Congress	2nd session	December 3, 1832 – March 2, 1833	Jacksonian	Andrew Stevenson	Jacksonian	Vacant	Andrew Jackson	Yes
22nd Congress	End	March 3, 1833	Jacksonian	Andrew Stevenson	Jacksonian	Vacant	Andrew Jackson	Yes
23rd Congress	Start	March 4, 1833	Jacksonian	Andrew Stevenson	National Republican	Martin Van Buren	Andrew Jackson	No
23rd Congress	1st session	December 2, 1833 – June 30, 1834	Jacksonian	Andrew Stevenson	National Republican	Martin Van Buren	Andrew Jackson	No
23rd Congress	2nd session	December 1, 1834 – March 3, 1835	Jacksonian	John Bell	National Republican	Martin Van Buren	Andrew Jackson	No
23rd Congress	End	March 3, 1835	Jacksonian	John Bell	National Republican	Martin Van Buren	Andrew Jackson	No
24th Congress	Start	March 4, 1835	Jacksonian	James K. Polk	National Republican	Martin Van Buren	Andrew Jackson	No/Yes
24th Congress	1st session	December 7, 1835 – July 4, 1836	Jacksonian	James K. Polk	National Republican	Martin Van Buren	Andrew Jackson	No/Yes
24th Congress	2nd session	December 5, 1836 – March 3, 1837	Jacksonian	James K. Polk	National Republican	Martin Van Buren	Andrew Jackson	No/Yes
24th Congress	End	March 3, 1837	Jacksonian	James K. Polk	National Republican	Martin Van Buren	Andrew Jackson	No/Yes
25th Congress	Start	March 4, 1837	Democratic	James K. Polk	Democratic	Richard Mentor Johnson	Martin Van Buren	Yes
25th Congress	Special session	March 4, 1837 – March 10, 1837	Democratic	James K. Polk	Democratic	Richard Mentor Johnson	Martin Van Buren	Yes
25th Congress	1st session	September 4, 1837 – October 16, 1837	Democratic	James K. Polk	Democratic	Richard Mentor Johnson	Martin Van Buren	Yes
25th Congress	2nd session	December 4, 1837 – July 9, 1838	Democratic	James K. Polk	Democratic	Richard Mentor Johnson	Martin Van Buren	Yes
25th Congress	3rd session	December 3, 1838 – March 3, 1839	Democratic	James K. Polk	Democratic	Richard Mentor Johnson	Martin Van Buren	Yes
25th Congress	End	March 3, 1839	Democratic	James K. Polk	Democratic	Richard Mentor Johnson	Martin Van Buren	Yes
26th Congress	Start	March 4, 1839	Democratic	Robert M. T. Hunter	Democratic	Richard Mentor Johnson	Martin Van Buren	Yes
26th Congress	1st session	December 2, 1839 – July 21, 1840	Democratic	Robert M. T. Hunter	Democratic	Richard Mentor Johnson	Martin Van Buren	Yes
26th Congress	2nd session	December 7, 1840 – March 3, 1841	Democratic	Robert M. T. Hunter	Democratic	Richard Mentor Johnson	Martin Van Buren	Yes
26th Congress	End	March 3, 1841	Democratic	Robert M. T. Hunter	Democratic	Richard Mentor Johnson	Martin Van Buren	Yes
27th Congress	Start	March 4, 1841	Whig	John White	Whig	John Tyler	William Henry Harrison (Note: Succession of Presidency due to Death)	Yes/No
27th Congress	Special session	March 4, 1841 – March 15, 1841	Whig	John White	Whig	Vacant (Note: Vacancy due to the death of a President)	John Tyler	Yes/No
27th Congress	1st session	May 31, 1841 – September 13, 1841	Whig	John White	Whig	Vacant	John Tyler	Yes/No
27th Congress	2nd session	December 6, 1841 – August 31, 1842	Whig	John White	Whig	Vacant	John Tyler	Yes/No
27th Congress	3rd session	December 5, 1842 – March 3, 1843	Whig	John White	Whig	Vacant	John Tyler	Yes/No
27th Congress	End	March 3, 1843	Whig	John White	Whig	Vacant	John Tyler	Yes/No
28th Congress	Start	March 4, 1843	Democratic	John Winston Jones	Whig	Vacant	John Tyler	No
28th Congress	1st session	December 4, 1843 – June 17, 1844	Democratic	John Winston Jones	Whig	Vacant	John Tyler	No
28th Congress	2nd session	December 2, 1844 – March 3, 1845	Democratic	John Winston Jones	Whig	Vacant	John Tyler	No
28th Congress	End	March 3, 1845	Democratic	John Winston Jones	Whig	Vacant	John Tyler	No
29th Congress	Start	March 4, 1845	Democratic	John Wesley Davis	Democratic	George M. Dallas	James K. Polk	Yes
29th Congress	Special session	March 4, 1845 – March 20, 1845	Democratic	John Wesley Davis	Democratic	George M. Dallas	James K. Polk	Yes
29th Congress	1st session	December 1, 1845 – August 10, 1846	Democratic	John Wesley Davis	Democratic	George M. Dallas	James K. Polk	Yes
29th Congress	2nd session	December 7, 1846 – March 3, 1847	Democratic	John Wesley Davis	Democratic	George M. Dallas	James K. Polk	Yes
29th Congress	End	March 3, 1847	Democratic	John Wesley Davis	Democratic	George M. Dallas	James K. Polk	Yes
30th Congress	Start	March 4, 1847	Whig	Robert Charles Winthrop	Democratic	George M. Dallas	James K. Polk	No
30th Congress	1st session	December 6, 1847 – August 14, 1848	Whig	Robert Charles Winthrop	Democratic	George M. Dallas	James K. Polk	No
30th Congress	2nd session	December 4, 1848 – March 3, 1849	Whig	Robert Charles Winthrop	Democratic	George M. Dallas	James K. Polk	No
30th Congress	End	March 3, 1849	Whig	Robert Charles Winthrop	Democratic	George M. Dallas	James K. Polk	No
31st Congress	Start	March 4, 1849	Democratic	Howell Cobb	Democratic	Millard Fillmore	Zachary Taylor (Note: Succession of Presidency due to Death)	No
31st Congress	Special session	March 5, 1849 – March 23, 1849	Democratic	Howell Cobb	Democratic	Vacant (Note: Vacancy due to the death of a President)	Millard Fillmore	No
31st Congress	1st session	December 3, 1849 – September 30, 1850	Democratic	Howell Cobb	Democratic	Vacant	Millard Fillmore	No
31st Congress	2nd session	December 2, 1850 – March 3, 1851	Democratic	Howell Cobb	Democratic	Vacant	Millard Fillmore	No
31st Congress	End	March 3, 1851	Democratic	Howell Cobb	Democratic	Vacant	Millard Fillmore	No
32nd Congress	Start	March 4, 1851	Democratic	Linn Boyd	Democratic	Vacant	Millard Fillmore	No
32nd Congress	Special session	March 4, 1851 – March 13, 1851	Democratic	Linn Boyd	Democratic	Vacant	Millard Fillmore	No
32nd Congress	1st session	December 1, 1851 – August 31, 1852	Democratic	Linn Boyd	Democratic	Vacant	Millard Fillmore	No
32nd Congress	2nd session	December 6, 1852 – March 3, 1853	Democratic	Linn Boyd	Democratic	Vacant	Millard Fillmore	No
32nd Congress	End	March 3, 1853	Democratic	Linn Boyd	Democratic	Vacant	Millard Fillmore	No
33rd Congress	Start	March 4, 1853	Democratic	Linn Boyd	Democratic	William R. King	Franklin Pierce	Yes
33rd Congress	Special session	March 4, 1853 – April 11, 1853	Democratic	Linn Boyd	Democratic	Vacant (Note: Vacancy due to Death)	Franklin Pierce	Yes
33rd Congress	1st session	December 5, 1853 – August 7, 1854	Democratic	Linn Boyd	Democratic	Vacant	Franklin Pierce	Yes
33rd Congress	2nd session	December 4, 1854 – March 3, 1855	Democratic	Linn Boyd	Democratic	Vacant	Franklin Pierce	Yes
33rd Congress	End	March 3, 1855	Democratic	Linn Boyd	Democratic	Vacant	Franklin Pierce	Yes
34th Congress	Start	March 4, 1855	Opposition Coalition: Free Soil; Know Nothing; Whig; Republican; Anti-Nebraska; Indiana People's Party; Independent; Independent Democrat	Nathaniel P. Banks	Democratic	Vacant	Franklin Pierce	No
34th Congress	1st session	December 3, 1855 – August 18, 1856	Opposition Coalition: Free Soil; Know Nothing; Whig; Republican; Anti-Nebraska; Indiana People's Party; Independent; Independent Democrat	Nathaniel P. Banks	Democratic	Vacant	Franklin Pierce	No
34th Congress	2nd session	August 21, 1856 – August 30, 1856	Opposition Coalition: Free Soil; Know Nothing; Whig; Republican; Anti-Nebraska; Indiana People's Party; Independent; Independent Democrat	Nathaniel P. Banks	Democratic	Vacant	Franklin Pierce	No
34th Congress	3rd session	December 1, 1856 – March 3, 1857	Opposition Coalition: Free Soil; Know Nothing; Whig; Republican; Anti-Nebraska; Indiana People's Party; Independent; Independent Democrat	Nathaniel P. Banks	Democratic	Vacant	Franklin Pierce	No
34th Congress	End	March 3, 1857	Opposition Coalition: Free Soil; Know Nothing; Whig; Republican; Anti-Nebraska; Indiana People's Party; Independent; Independent Democrat	Nathaniel P. Banks	Democratic	Vacant	Franklin Pierce	No
35th Congress	Start	March 4, 1857	Democratic	James Lawrence Orr	Democratic	John C. Breckinridge	James Buchanan	Yes
35th Congress	Special session	March 4, 1857 – March 14, 1857	Democratic	James Lawrence Orr	Democratic	John C. Breckinridge	James Buchanan	Yes
35th Congress	1st session	December 7, 1857 – June 14, 1858	Democratic	James Lawrence Orr	Democratic	John C. Breckinridge	James Buchanan	Yes
35th Congress	Special session	June 15, 1858 – June 16, 1858	Democratic	James Lawrence Orr	Democratic	John C. Breckinridge	James Buchanan	Yes
35th Congress	2nd session	December 6, 1858 – March 3, 1859	Democratic	James Lawrence Orr	Democratic	John C. Breckinridge	James Buchanan	Yes
35th Congress	End	March 3, 1859	Democratic	James Lawrence Orr	Democratic	John C. Breckinridge	James Buchanan	Yes
36th Congress	Start	March 4, 1859	Republican	William Pennington	Democratic	John C. Breckinridge	James Buchanan	No
36th Congress	Special session	March 4, 1859 – March 10, 1859	Republican	William Pennington	Democratic	John C. Breckinridge	James Buchanan	No
36th Congress	1st session	December 5, 1859 – June 25, 1860	Republican	William Pennington	Democratic	John C. Breckinridge	James Buchanan	No
36th Congress	Special session	June 26, 1860 – June 28, 1860	Republican	William Pennington	Democratic	John C. Breckinridge	James Buchanan	No
36th Congress	2nd session	December 3, 1860 – March 3, 1861	Republican	William Pennington	Democratic	John C. Breckinridge	James Buchanan	No
36th Congress	End	March 3, 1861	Republican	William Pennington	Republican	John C. Breckinridge	James Buchanan	No
37th Congress	Start	March 4, 1861	Republican	Galusha A. Grow	Republican	Hannibal Hamlin	Abraham Lincoln	Yes
37th Congress	Special session	March 4, 1861 – March 28, 1861	Republican	Galusha A. Grow	Republican	Hannibal Hamlin	Abraham Lincoln	Yes
37th Congress	1st session	July 4, 1861 – August 6, 1861	Republican	Galusha A. Grow	Republican	Hannibal Hamlin	Abraham Lincoln	Yes
37th Congress	2nd session	December 2, 1861 – July 17, 1862	Republican	Galusha A. Grow	Republican	Hannibal Hamlin	Abraham Lincoln	Yes
37th Congress	3rd session	December 1, 1862 – March 3, 1863	Republican	Galusha A. Grow	Republican	Hannibal Hamlin	Abraham Lincoln	Yes
37th Congress	End	March 3, 1863	Republican	Galusha A. Grow	Republican	Hannibal Hamlin	Abraham Lincoln	Yes
38th Congress	Start	March 4, 1863	National Union Coalition: Republican; Union	Schuyler Colfax	National Union Coalition: Republican; Union	Hannibal Hamlin	Abraham Lincoln	Yes
38th Congress	Special session	March 4, 1863 – March 14, 1863	National Union Coalition: Republican; Union	Schuyler Colfax	National Union Coalition: Republican; Union	Hannibal Hamlin	Abraham Lincoln	Yes
38th Congress	1st session	December 7, 1863 – July 4, 1864	National Union Coalition: Republican; Union	Schuyler Colfax	National Union Coalition: Republican; Union	Hannibal Hamlin	Abraham Lincoln	Yes
38th Congress	2nd session	December 5, 1864 – March 3, 1865	National Union Coalition: Republican; Union	Schuyler Colfax	National Union Coalition: Republican; Union	Hannibal Hamlin	Abraham Lincoln	Yes
38th Congress	End	March 3, 1865	National Union Coalition: Republican; Union	Schuyler Colfax	National Union Coalition: Republican; Union	Hannibal Hamlin	Abraham Lincoln	Yes
39th Congress	Start	March 4, 1865	National Union Coalition: Republican; Union	Schuyler Colfax	National Union Coalition: Republican; Union	Andrew Johnson	Abraham Lincoln (Note: Succession of Presidency due to Death)	Yes/No
39th Congress	Special session	March 4, 1865 – March 11, 1865	National Union Coalition: Republican; Union	Schuyler Colfax	National Union Coalition: Republican; Union	Vacant (Note: Vacancy due to the death of a President)	Andrew Johnson	Yes/No
39th Congress	1st session	December 4, 1865 – July 28, 1866	National Union Coalition: Republican; Union	Schuyler Colfax	National Union Coalition: Republican; Union	Vacant	Andrew Johnson	Yes/No
39th Congress	2nd session	December 3, 1866 – March 3, 1867	National Union Coalition: Republican; Union	Schuyler Colfax	National Union Coalition: Republican; Union	Vacant	Andrew Johnson	Yes/No
39th Congress	End	March 3, 1867	National Union Coalition: Republican; Union	Schuyler Colfax	National Union Coalition: Republican; Union	Vacant	Andrew Johnson	Yes/No
40th Congress	Start	March 4, 1867	Republican	Schuyler Colfax (Note: Resigned from Office and left Congress)	Republican	Vacant	Andrew Johnson	No
40th Congress	1st session	March 4, 1867 – December 1, 1867	Republican	Schuyler Colfax	Republican	Vacant	Andrew Johnson	No
40th Congress	Special session	April 1, 1867 – April 20, 1867	Republican	Schuyler Colfax	Republican	Vacant	Andrew Johnson	No
40th Congress	2nd session	December 2, 1867 – November 10, 1868	Republican	Theodore M. Pomeroy	Republican	Vacant	Andrew Johnson	No
40th Congress	3rd session	December 7, 1868 – March 3, 1869	Republican	Theodore M. Pomeroy	Republican	Vacant	Andrew Johnson	No
40th Congress	End	March 3, 1869	Republican	Theodore M. Pomeroy	Republican	Vacant	Andrew Johnson	No
41st Congress	Start	March 4, 1869	Republican	James G. Blaine	Republican	Schuyler Colfax	Ulysses S. Grant	Yes
41st Congress	1st session	March 4, 1869 – April 10, 1869	Republican	James G. Blaine	Republican	Schuyler Colfax	Ulysses S. Grant	Yes
41st Congress	Special session	April 12, 1869 – April 22, 1869	Republican	James G. Blaine	Republican	Schuyler Colfax	Ulysses S. Grant	Yes
41st Congress	2nd session	December 6, 1869 – July 15, 1870	Republican	James G. Blaine	Republican	Schuyler Colfax	Ulysses S. Grant	Yes
41st Congress	3rd session	December 5, 1870 – March 3, 1871	Republican	James G. Blaine	Republican	Schuyler Colfax	Ulysses S. Grant	Yes
41st Congress	End	March 3, 1871	Republican	James G. Blaine	Republican	Schuyler Colfax	Ulysses S. Grant	Yes
42nd Congress	Start	March 4, 1871	Republican	James G. Blaine	Republican	Schuyler Colfax	Ulysses S. Grant	Yes
42nd Congress	1st session	March 4, 1871 – April 20, 1871	Republican	James G. Blaine	Republican	Schuyler Colfax	Ulysses S. Grant	Yes
42nd Congress	Special session	May 10, 1871 – May 27, 1871	Republican	James G. Blaine	Republican	Schuyler Colfax	Ulysses S. Grant	Yes
42nd Congress	2nd session	December 4, 1871 – June 10, 1872	Republican	James G. Blaine	Republican	Schuyler Colfax	Ulysses S. Grant	Yes
42nd Congress	3rd session	December 2, 1872 – March 3, 1873	Republican	James G. Blaine	Republican	Schuyler Colfax	Ulysses S. Grant	Yes
42nd Congress	End	March 3, 1873	Republican	James G. Blaine	Republican	Schuyler Colfax	Ulysses S. Grant	Yes
43rd Congress	Start	March 4, 1873	Republican	James G. Blaine	Republican	Henry Wilson	Ulysses S. Grant	Yes
43rd Congress	Special session	March 4, 1873 – March 26, 1873	Republican	James G. Blaine	Republican	Henry Wilson	Ulysses S. Grant	Yes
43rd Congress	1st session	December 1, 1873 – June 23, 1874	Republican	James G. Blaine	Republican	Henry Wilson	Ulysses S. Grant	Yes
43rd Congress	2nd session	December 7, 1874 – March 3, 1875	Republican	James G. Blaine	Republican	Henry Wilson	Ulysses S. Grant	Yes
43rd Congress	End	March 3, 1875	Republican	James G. Blaine	Republican	Henry Wilson	Ulysses S. Grant	Yes
44th Congress	Start	March 4, 1875	Democratic	Michael C. Kerr (Note: Died while in Office)	Republican	Henry Wilson	Ulysses S. Grant	No
44th Congress	Special session	March 5, 1875 – March 24, 1875	Democratic	Michael C. Kerr	Republican	Vacant (Note: Vacancy due to Death)	Ulysses S. Grant	No
44th Congress	1st session	December 6, 1875 – August 15, 1876	Democratic	Michael C. Kerr	Republican	Vacant	Ulysses S. Grant	No
44th Congress	2nd session	December 4, 1876 – March 3, 1877	Democratic	Samuel J. Randall	Republican	Vacant	Ulysses S. Grant	No
44th Congress	End	March 3, 1877	Democratic	Samuel J. Randall	Republican	Vacant	Ulysses S. Grant	No
45th Congress	Start	March 4, 1877	Democratic	Samuel J. Randall	Republican	William A. Wheeler	Rutherford B. Hayes	No
45th Congress	Special session	March 5, 1877 – March 17, 1877	Democratic	Samuel J. Randall	Republican	William A. Wheeler	Rutherford B. Hayes	No
45th Congress	1st session	October 15, 1877 – December 3, 1877	Democratic	Samuel J. Randall	Republican	William A. Wheeler	Rutherford B. Hayes	No
45th Congress	2nd session	December 3, 1877 – June 20, 1878	Democratic	Samuel J. Randall	Republican	William A. Wheeler	Rutherford B. Hayes	No
45th Congress	3rd session	December 2, 1878 – March 3, 1879	Democratic	Samuel J. Randall	Republican	William A. Wheeler	Rutherford B. Hayes	No
45th Congress	End	March 3, 1879	Democratic	Samuel J. Randall	Republican	William A. Wheeler	Rutherford B. Hayes	No
46th Congress	Start	March 4, 1879	Democrat Coalition: Democrat; 6 Independent Democrats	Samuel J. Randall	Democratic	William A. Wheeler	Rutherford B. Hayes	No
46th Congress	1st session	March 18, 1879 – July 1, 1879	Democrat Coalition: Democrat; 6 Independent Democrats	Samuel J. Randall	Democratic	William A. Wheeler	Rutherford B. Hayes	No
46th Congress	2nd session	December 1, 1879 – June 16, 1880	Democrat Coalition: Democrat; 6 Independent Democrats	Samuel J. Randall	Democratic	William A. Wheeler	Rutherford B. Hayes	No
46th Congress	3rd session	December 6, 1880 – March 3, 1881	Democrat Coalition: Democrat; 6 Independent Democrats	Samuel J. Randall	Democratic	William A. Wheeler	Rutherford B. Hayes	No
46th Congress	End	March 3, 1881	Democrat Coalition: Democrat; 6 Independent Democrats	Samuel J. Randall	Democratic	William A. Wheeler	Rutherford B. Hayes	No
47th Congress	Start	March 4, 1881	Republican	J. Warren Keifer	Democratic	Chester A. Arthur	James A. Garfield (Note: Succession of Presidency due to Death)	Yes/No
47th Congress	Special session	March 4, 1881 – May 20, 1881	Republican	J. Warren Keifer	Democratic	Vacant (Note: Vacancy due to the death of a President)	Chester A. Arthur	Yes/No
47th Congress	Special session	October 10, 1881 – October 29, 1881	Split	J. Warren Keifer	Democratic	Vacant	Chester A. Arthur	Yes/No
47th Congress	1st session	December 5, 1881 – August 8, 1882	Split	J. Warren Keifer	Republican Coalition: Republican; Readjuster	Vacant	Chester A. Arthur	Yes/No
47th Congress	2nd session	December 4, 1882 – March 3, 1883	Split	J. Warren Keifer	Republican Coalition: Republican; Readjuster	Vacant	Chester A. Arthur	Yes/No
47th Congress	End	March 3, 1883	Split	J. Warren Keifer	Republican Coalition: Republican; Readjuster	Vacant	Chester A. Arthur	Yes/No
48th Congress	Start	March 4, 1883	Democratic	John G. Carlisle	Republican Coalition: Republican; Readjuster	Vacant	Chester A. Arthur	No
48th Congress	1st session	December 3, 1883 – July 7, 1884	Democratic	John G. Carlisle	Republican Coalition: Republican; Readjuster	Vacant	Chester A. Arthur	No
48th Congress	2nd session	December 1, 1884 – March 3, 1885	Democratic	John G. Carlisle	Republican Coalition: Republican; Readjuster	Vacant	Chester A. Arthur	No
48th Congress	End	March 3, 1885	Democratic	John G. Carlisle	Republican Coalition: Republican; Readjuster	Vacant	Chester A. Arthur	No
49th Congress	Start	March 4, 1885	Democratic	John G. Carlisle	Republican Coalition: Republican; Readjuster	Thomas A. Hendricks	Grover Cleveland	No
49th Congress	Special session	March 4, 1885 – April 2, 1885	Democratic	John G. Carlisle	Republican Coalition: Republican; Readjuster	Vacant (Note: Vacancy due to Death)	Grover Cleveland	No
49th Congress	1st session	December 7, 1885 – August 5, 1886	Democratic	John G. Carlisle	Republican Coalition: Republican; Readjuster	Vacant	Grover Cleveland	No
49th Congress	2nd session	December 6, 1886 – March 3, 1887	Democratic	John G. Carlisle	Republican Coalition: Republican; Readjuster	Vacant	Grover Cleveland	No
49th Congress	End	March 3, 1887	Democratic	John G. Carlisle	Republican Coalition: Republican; Readjuster	Vacant	Grover Cleveland	No
50th Congress	Start	March 4, 1887	Democratic	John G. Carlisle	Republican Coalition: Republican; Readjuster	Vacant	Grover Cleveland	No
50th Congress	1st session	December 5, 1887 – October 20, 1888	Democratic	John G. Carlisle	Republican Coalition: Republican; Readjuster	Vacant	Grover Cleveland	No
50th Congress	2nd session	December 3, 1888 – March 3, 1889	Democratic	John G. Carlisle	Republican Coalition: Republican; Readjuster	Vacant	Grover Cleveland	No
50th Congress	End	March 3, 1889	Democratic	John G. Carlisle	Republican Coalition: Republican; Readjuster	Vacant	Grover Cleveland	No
51st Congress	Start	March 4, 1889	Republican	Thomas Brackett Reed	Republican	Levi P. Morton	Benjamin Harrison	Yes
51st Congress	Special session	March 4, 1889 – April 2, 1889	Republican	Thomas Brackett Reed	Republican	Levi P. Morton	Benjamin Harrison	Yes
51st Congress	1st session	December 2, 1889 – October 1, 1890	Republican	Thomas Brackett Reed	Republican	Levi P. Morton	Benjamin Harrison	Yes
51st Congress	2nd session	December 1, 1890 – March 3, 1891	Republican	Thomas Brackett Reed	Republican	Levi P. Morton	Benjamin Harrison	Yes
51st Congress	End	March 3, 1891	Republican	Thomas Brackett Reed	Republican	Levi P. Morton	Benjamin Harrison	Yes
52nd Congress	Start	March 4, 1891	Democratic	Charles Frederick Crisp	Republican	Levi P. Morton	Benjamin Harrison	No
52nd Congress	1st session	December 7, 1891 – August 5, 1892	Democratic	Charles Frederick Crisp	Republican	Levi P. Morton	Benjamin Harrison	No
52nd Congress	2nd session	December 5, 1892 – March 3, 1893	Democratic	Charles Frederick Crisp	Republican	Levi P. Morton	Benjamin Harrison	No
52nd Congress	End	March 3, 1893	Democratic	Charles Frederick Crisp	Republican	Levi P. Morton	Benjamin Harrison	No
53rd Congress	Start	March 4, 1893	Democratic	Charles Frederick Crisp	Democratic	Adlai Stevenson I	Grover Cleveland	Yes
53rd Congress	Special session	March 4, 1893 – April 15, 1893	Democratic	Charles Frederick Crisp	Democratic	Adlai Stevenson I	Grover Cleveland	Yes
53rd Congress	1st session	August 7, 1893 – November 3, 1893	Democratic	Charles Frederick Crisp	Democratic	Adlai Stevenson I	Grover Cleveland	Yes
53rd Congress	2nd session	December 4, 1893 – August 28, 1894	Democratic	Charles Frederick Crisp	Democratic	Adlai Stevenson I	Grover Cleveland	Yes
53rd Congress	3rd session	December 3, 1894 – March 3, 1895	Democratic	Charles Frederick Crisp	Democratic	Adlai Stevenson I	Grover Cleveland	Yes
53rd Congress	End	March 3, 1895	Democratic	Charles Frederick Crisp	Democratic	Adlai Stevenson I	Grover Cleveland	Yes
54th Congress	Start	March 4, 1895	Republican	Thomas Brackett Reed	Republican Coalition: Republican; Silver	Adlai Stevenson I	Grover Cleveland	No
54th Congress	1st session	December 2, 1895 – June 11, 1896	Republican	Thomas Brackett Reed	Republican Coalition: Republican; Silver	Adlai Stevenson I	Grover Cleveland	No
54th Congress	2nd session	December 7, 1896 – March 3, 1897	Republican	Thomas Brackett Reed	Republican Coalition: Republican; Silver	Adlai Stevenson I	Grover Cleveland	No
54th Congress	End	March 3, 1897	Republican	Thomas Brackett Reed	Republican Coalition: Republican; Silver	Adlai Stevenson I	Grover Cleveland	No
55th Congress	Start	March 4, 1897	Republican	Thomas Brackett Reed	Republican	Garret Hobart	William McKinley (Note: Succession of Presidency due to Death)	Yes
55th Congress	Special session	March 4, 1897 – March 10, 1897	Republican	Thomas Brackett Reed	Republican	Garret Hobart	William McKinley	Yes
55th Congress	1st session	March 15, 1897 – July 24, 1897	Republican	Thomas Brackett Reed	Republican	Garret Hobart	William McKinley	Yes
55th Congress	2nd session	December 6, 1897 – July 8, 1898	Republican	Thomas Brackett Reed	Republican	Garret Hobart	William McKinley	Yes
55th Congress	3rd session	December 5, 1898 – March 3, 1899	Republican	Thomas Brackett Reed	Republican	Garret Hobart	William McKinley	Yes
55th Congress	End	March 3, 1899	Republican	Thomas Brackett Reed	Republican	Garret Hobart	William McKinley	Yes
56th Congress	Start	March 4, 1899	Republican	David B. Henderson	Republican	Garret Hobart	William McKinley	Yes
56th Congress	1st session	December 4, 1899 – June 7, 1900	Republican	David B. Henderson	Republican	Vacant (Note: Vacancy due to Death)	William McKinley	Yes
56th Congress	2nd session	December 3, 1900 – March 3, 1901	Republican	David B. Henderson	Republican	Vacant	William McKinley	Yes
56th Congress	End	March 3, 1901	Republican	David B. Henderson	Republican	Vacant	William McKinley	Yes
57th Congress	Start	March 4, 1901	Republican	David B. Henderson	Republican	Theodore Roosevelt	William McKinley	Yes
57th Congress	Special session	March 4, 1901 – March 9, 1901	Republican	David B. Henderson	Republican	Vacant (Note: Vacancy due to the death of a President)	Theodore Roosevelt	Yes
57th Congress	1st session	December 2, 1901 – July 1, 1902	Republican	David B. Henderson	Republican	Vacant	Theodore Roosevelt	Yes
57th Congress	2nd session	December 1, 1902 – March 3, 1903	Republican	David B. Henderson	Republican	Vacant	Theodore Roosevelt	Yes
57th Congress	End	March 3, 1903	Republican	David B. Henderson	Republican	Vacant	Theodore Roosevelt	Yes
58th Congress	Start	March 4, 1903	Republican	Joseph Gurney Cannon	Republican	Vacant	Theodore Roosevelt	Yes
58th Congress	Special session	March 5, 1903 – March 19, 1903	Republican	Joseph Gurney Cannon	Republican	Vacant	Theodore Roosevelt	Yes
58th Congress	1st session	November 9, 1903 – December 7, 1903	Republican	Joseph Gurney Cannon	Republican	Vacant	Theodore Roosevelt	Yes
58th Congress	2nd session	December 7, 1903 – April 28, 1904	Republican	Joseph Gurney Cannon	Republican	Vacant	Theodore Roosevelt	Yes
58th Congress	3rd session	December 5, 1904 – March 3, 1905	Republican	Joseph Gurney Cannon	Republican	Vacant	Theodore Roosevelt	Yes
58th Congress	End	March 3, 1905	Republican	Joseph Gurney Cannon	Republican	Vacant	Theodore Roosevelt	Yes
59th Congress	Start	March 4, 1905	Republican	Joseph Gurney Cannon	Republican	Charles W. Fairbanks	Theodore Roosevelt	Yes
59th Congress	Special session	March 4, 1905 – March 18, 1905	Republican	Joseph Gurney Cannon	Republican	Charles W. Fairbanks	Theodore Roosevelt	Yes
59th Congress	1st session	December 4, 1905 – June 30, 1906	Republican	Joseph Gurney Cannon	Republican	Charles W. Fairbanks	Theodore Roosevelt	Yes
59th Congress	2nd session	December 3, 1906 – March 3, 1907	Republican	Joseph Gurney Cannon	Republican	Charles W. Fairbanks	Theodore Roosevelt	Yes
59th Congress	End	March 3, 1907	Republican	Joseph Gurney Cannon	Republican	Charles W. Fairbanks	Theodore Roosevelt	Yes
60th Congress	Start	March 4, 1907	Republican	Joseph Gurney Cannon	Republican	Charles W. Fairbanks	Theodore Roosevelt	Yes
60th Congress	1st session	December 2, 1907 – May 30, 1908	Republican	Joseph Gurney Cannon	Republican	Charles W. Fairbanks	Theodore Roosevelt	Yes
60th Congress	2nd session	December 7, 1908 – March 3, 1909	Republican	Joseph Gurney Cannon	Republican	Charles W. Fairbanks	Theodore Roosevelt	Yes
60th Congress	End	March 3, 1909	Republican	Joseph Gurney Cannon	Republican	Charles W. Fairbanks	Theodore Roosevelt	Yes
61st Congress	Start	March 4, 1909	Republican	Joseph Gurney Cannon	Republican	James S. Sherman	William H. Taft	Yes
61st Congress	Special session	March 4, 1909 – March 6, 1909	Republican	Joseph Gurney Cannon	Republican	James S. Sherman	William H. Taft	Yes
61st Congress	1st session	March 15, 1909 – August 5, 1909	Republican	Joseph Gurney Cannon	Republican	James S. Sherman	William H. Taft	Yes
61st Congress	2nd session	December 6, 1909 – June 25, 1910	Republican	Joseph Gurney Cannon	Republican	James S. Sherman	William H. Taft	Yes
61st Congress	3rd session	December 5, 1910 – March 3, 1911	Republican	Joseph Gurney Cannon	Republican	James S. Sherman	William H. Taft	Yes
61st Congress	End	March 3, 1911	Republican	Joseph Gurney Cannon	Republican	James S. Sherman	William H. Taft	Yes
62nd Congress	Start	March 4, 1911	Democratic	Champ Clark	Republican	James S. Sherman	William H. Taft	No
62nd Congress	1st session	April 4, 1911 – August 22, 1911	Democratic	Champ Clark	Republican	Vacant (Note: Vacancy due to Death)	William H. Taft	No
62nd Congress	2nd session	December 4, 1911 – August 26, 1912	Democratic	Champ Clark	Republican	Vacant	William H. Taft	No
62nd Congress	3rd session	December 2, 1912 – March 3, 1913	Democratic	Champ Clark	Republican	Vacant	William H. Taft	No
62nd Congress	End	March 3, 1913	Democratic	Champ Clark	Republican	Vacant	William H. Taft	No
63rd Congress	Start	March 4, 1913	Democratic	Champ Clark	Democratic	Thomas R. Marshall	Woodrow Wilson	Yes
63rd Congress	Special session	March 4, 1913 – March 17, 1913	Democratic	Champ Clark	Democratic	Thomas R. Marshall	Woodrow Wilson	Yes
63rd Congress	1st session	April 7, 1913 – December 1, 1913	Democratic	Champ Clark	Democratic	Thomas R. Marshall	Woodrow Wilson	Yes
63rd Congress	2nd session	December 1, 1913 – October 24, 1914	Democratic	Champ Clark	Democratic	Thomas R. Marshall	Woodrow Wilson	Yes
63rd Congress	3rd session	December 7, 1914 – March 3, 1915	Democratic	Champ Clark	Democratic	Thomas R. Marshall	Woodrow Wilson	Yes
63rd Congress	End	March 3, 1915	Democratic	Champ Clark	Democratic	Thomas R. Marshall	Woodrow Wilson	Yes
64th Congress	Start	March 4, 1915	Democratic	Champ Clark	Democratic	Thomas R. Marshall	Woodrow Wilson	Yes
64th Congress	1st session	December 6, 1915 – September 8, 1916	Democratic	Champ Clark	Democratic	Thomas R. Marshall	Woodrow Wilson	Yes
64th Congress	2nd session	December 4, 1916 – March 3, 1917	Democratic	Champ Clark	Democratic	Thomas R. Marshall	Woodrow Wilson	Yes
64th Congress	End	March 3, 1917	Democratic	Champ Clark	Democratic	Thomas R. Marshall	Woodrow Wilson	Yes
65th Congress	Start	March 4, 1917	Democrat Coalition: Democrat; Progressive; Socialist	Champ Clark	Democratic	Thomas R. Marshall	Woodrow Wilson	Yes
65th Congress	Special session	March 5, 1917 – March 16, 1917	Democrat Coalition: Democrat; Progressive; Socialist	Champ Clark	Democratic	Thomas R. Marshall	Woodrow Wilson	Yes
65th Congress	1st session	April 2, 1917 – October 6, 1917	Democrat Coalition: Democrat; Progressive; Socialist	Champ Clark	Democratic	Thomas R. Marshall	Woodrow Wilson	Yes
65th Congress	2nd session	December 3, 1917 – November 21, 1918	Democrat Coalition: Democrat; Progressive; Socialist	Champ Clark	Democratic	Thomas R. Marshall	Woodrow Wilson	Yes
65th Congress	3rd session	December 2, 1918 – March 3, 1919	Democrat Coalition: Democrat; Progressive; Socialist	Champ Clark	Democratic	Thomas R. Marshall	Woodrow Wilson	Yes
65th Congress	End	March 3, 1919	Democrat Coalition: Democrat; Progressive; Socialist	Champ Clark	Democratic	Thomas R. Marshall	Woodrow Wilson	Yes
66th Congress	Start	March 4, 1919	Republican	Frederick H. Gillett	Republican	Thomas R. Marshall	Woodrow Wilson	No
66th Congress	1st session	May 19, 1919 – November 19, 1919	Republican	Frederick H. Gillett	Republican	Thomas R. Marshall	Woodrow Wilson	No
66th Congress	2nd session	December 1, 1919 – June 5, 1920	Republican	Frederick H. Gillett	Republican	Thomas R. Marshall	Woodrow Wilson	No
66th Congress	3rd session	December 6, 1920 – March 3, 1921	Republican	Frederick H. Gillett	Republican	Thomas R. Marshall	Woodrow Wilson	No
66th Congress	End	March 3, 1921	Republican	Frederick H. Gillett	Republican	Thomas R. Marshall	Woodrow Wilson	No
67th Congress	Start	March 4, 1921	Republican	Frederick H. Gillett	Republican	Calvin Coolidge	Warren G. Harding (Note: Succession of Presidency due to Death)	Yes
67th Congress	Special session	March 4, 1921 – March 15, 1921	Republican	Frederick H. Gillett	Republican	Calvin Coolidge	Warren G. Harding	Yes
67th Congress	1st session	April 11, 1921 – November 23, 1921	Republican	Frederick H. Gillett	Republican	Calvin Coolidge	Warren G. Harding	Yes
67th Congress	2nd session	December 5, 1921 – September 22, 1922	Republican	Frederick H. Gillett	Republican	Calvin Coolidge	Warren G. Harding	Yes
67th Congress	3rd session	November 20, 1922 – December 4, 1922	Republican	Frederick H. Gillett	Republican	Calvin Coolidge	Warren G. Harding	Yes
67th Congress	4th session	December 4, 1922 – March 3, 1923	Republican	Frederick H. Gillett	Republican	Calvin Coolidge	Warren G. Harding	Yes
67th Congress	End	March 3, 1923	Republican	Frederick H. Gillett	Republican	Calvin Coolidge	Warren G. Harding	Yes
68th Congress	Start	March 4, 1923	Republican	Frederick H. Gillett	Republican	Calvin Coolidge	Warren G. Harding	Yes
68th Congress	1st session	December 3, 1923 – June 7, 1924	Republican	Frederick H. Gillett	Republican	Vacant (Note: Vacancy due to the death of a President)	Calvin Coolidge	Yes
68th Congress	2nd session	December 1, 1924 – March 3, 1925	Republican	Frederick H. Gillett	Republican	Vacant	Calvin Coolidge	Yes
68th Congress	End	March 3, 1925	Republican	Frederick H. Gillett	Republican	Vacant	Calvin Coolidge	Yes
69th Congress	Start	March 4, 1925	Republican	Nicholas Longworth	Republican	Charles G. Dawes	Calvin Coolidge	Yes
69th Congress	Special session	March 4, 1925 – March 18, 1925	Republican	Nicholas Longworth	Republican	Charles G. Dawes	Calvin Coolidge	Yes
69th Congress	1st session	December 7, 1925 – July 3, 1926	Republican	Nicholas Longworth	Republican	Charles G. Dawes	Calvin Coolidge	Yes
69th Congress	2nd session	December 6, 1926 – March 4, 1927	Republican	Nicholas Longworth	Republican	Charles G. Dawes	Calvin Coolidge	Yes
69th Congress	End	March 3, 1927	Republican	Nicholas Longworth	Republican	Charles G. Dawes	Calvin Coolidge	Yes
70th Congress	Start	March 4, 1927	Republican	Nicholas Longworth	Republican	Charles G. Dawes	Calvin Coolidge	Yes
70th Congress	1st session	December 5, 1927 – May 29, 1928	Republican	Nicholas Longworth	Republican	Charles G. Dawes	Calvin Coolidge	Yes
70th Congress	2nd session	December 3, 1928 – March 3, 1929	Republican	Nicholas Longworth	Republican	Charles G. Dawes	Calvin Coolidge	Yes
70th Congress	End	March 3, 1929	Republican	Nicholas Longworth	Republican	Charles G. Dawes	Calvin Coolidge	Yes
71st Congress	Start	March 4, 1929	Republican	Nicholas Longworth	Republican	Charles Curtis	Herbert Hoover	Yes
71st Congress	Special session	March 4, 1929 – March 5, 1929	Republican	Nicholas Longworth	Republican	Charles Curtis	Herbert Hoover	Yes
71st Congress	1st session	April 15, 1929 – November 22, 1929	Republican	Nicholas Longworth	Republican	Charles Curtis	Herbert Hoover	Yes
71st Congress	2nd session	December 2, 1929 – July 3, 1930	Republican	Nicholas Longworth	Republican	Charles Curtis	Herbert Hoover	Yes
71st Congress	Special session	July 7, 1930 – July 21, 1930	Republican	Nicholas Longworth	Republican	Charles Curtis	Herbert Hoover	Yes
71st Congress	3rd session	December 1, 1930 – March 3, 1931	Republican	Nicholas Longworth	Republican	Charles Curtis	Herbert Hoover	Yes
71st Congress	End	March 3, 1931	Republican	Nicholas Longworth	Republican	Charles Curtis	Herbert Hoover	Yes
72nd Congress	Start	March 4, 1931	Democratic	John Nance Garner	Republican	Charles Curtis	Herbert Hoover	No
72nd Congress	1st session	December 7, 1931 – July 16, 1932	Democratic	John Nance Garner	Republican	Charles Curtis	Herbert Hoover	No
72nd Congress	2nd session	December 5, 1932 – March 3, 1933	Democratic	John Nance Garner	Republican	Charles Curtis	Herbert Hoover	No
72nd Congress	End	March 3, 1933	Democratic	John Nance Garner	Republican	Charles Curtis	Herbert Hoover	No
73rd Congress	Start	March 4, 1933	Democratic	Henry Thomas Rainey (Note: Died while in Office)	Democratic	John Nance Garner	Franklin D. Roosevelt (Note: Succession of Presidency due to Death)	Yes
73rd Congress	Special session	March 4, 1933 – March 6, 1933	Democratic	Henry Thomas Rainey	Democratic	John Nance Garner	Franklin D. Roosevelt	Yes
73rd Congress	1st session	March 9, 1933 – June 15, 1933	Democratic	Henry Thomas Rainey	Democratic	John Nance Garner	Franklin D. Roosevelt	Yes
73rd Congress	2nd session	January 3, 1934 – June 18, 1934	Democratic	Henry Thomas Rainey	Democratic	John Nance Garner	Franklin D. Roosevelt	Yes
73rd Congress	End	January 3, 1935	Democratic	Henry Thomas Rainey	Democratic	John Nance Garner	Franklin D. Roosevelt	Yes
74th Congress	Start	January 3, 1935	Democratic	Jo Byrns (Note: Died while in Office)	Democratic	John Nance Garner	Franklin D. Roosevelt	Yes
74th Congress	1st session	January 3, 1935 – August 26, 1935	Democratic	Jo Byrns	Democratic	John Nance Garner	Franklin D. Roosevelt	Yes
74th Congress	2nd session	January 3, 1936 – June 20, 1936	Democratic	William B. Bankhead (Note: Died while in Office)	Democratic	John Nance Garner	Franklin D. Roosevelt	Yes
74th Congress	End	January 3, 1937	Democratic	William B. Bankhead	Democratic	John Nance Garner	Franklin D. Roosevelt	Yes
75th Congress	Start	January 3, 1937	Democratic	William B. Bankhead	Democratic	John Nance Garner	Franklin D. Roosevelt	Yes
75th Congress	1st session	January 5, 1937 – August 21, 1937	Democratic	William B. Bankhead	Democratic	John Nance Garner	Franklin D. Roosevelt	Yes
75th Congress	2nd session	November 15, 1937 – December 21, 1937	Democratic	William B. Bankhead	Democratic	John Nance Garner	Franklin D. Roosevelt	Yes
75th Congress	3rd session	January 3, 1938 – June 16, 1938	Democratic	William B. Bankhead	Democratic	John Nance Garner	Franklin D. Roosevelt	Yes
75th Congress	End	January 3, 1939	Democratic	William B. Bankhead	Democratic	John Nance Garner	Franklin D. Roosevelt	Yes
76th Congress	Start	January 3, 1939	Democratic	William B. Bankhead	Democratic	John Nance Garner	Franklin D. Roosevelt	Yes
76th Congress	1st session	January 3, 1939 – August 5, 1939	Democratic	William B. Bankhead	Democratic	John Nance Garner	Franklin D. Roosevelt	Yes
76th Congress	2nd session	September 21, 1939 – November 3, 1939	Democratic	Sam Rayburn	Democratic	John Nance Garner	Franklin D. Roosevelt	Yes
76th Congress	3rd session	January 3, 1940 – January 3, 1941	Democratic	Sam Rayburn	Democratic	John Nance Garner	Franklin D. Roosevelt	Yes
76th Congress	End	January 3, 1941	Democratic	Sam Rayburn	Democratic	John Nance Garner	Franklin D. Roosevelt	Yes
77th Congress	Start	January 3, 1941	Democratic	Sam Rayburn	Democratic	Henry A. Wallace	Franklin D. Roosevelt	Yes
77th Congress	1st session	January 3, 1941 – January 2, 1942	Democratic	Sam Rayburn	Democratic	Henry A. Wallace	Franklin D. Roosevelt	Yes
77th Congress	2nd session	January 5, 1942 – December 16, 1942	Democratic	Sam Rayburn	Democratic	Henry A. Wallace	Franklin D. Roosevelt	Yes
77th Congress	End	January 3, 1943	Democratic	Sam Rayburn	Democratic	Henry A. Wallace	Franklin D. Roosevelt	Yes
78th Congress	Start	January 3, 1943	Democratic	Sam Rayburn	Democratic	Henry A. Wallace	Franklin D. Roosevelt	Yes
78th Congress	1st session	January 6, 1943 – December 21, 1943	Democratic	Sam Rayburn	Democratic	Henry A. Wallace	Franklin D. Roosevelt	Yes
78th Congress	2nd session	January 10, 1944 – December 19, 1944	Democratic	Sam Rayburn	Democratic	Henry A. Wallace	Franklin D. Roosevelt	Yes
78th Congress	End	January 3, 1945	Democratic	Sam Rayburn	Democratic	Henry A. Wallace	Franklin D. Roosevelt	Yes
79th Congress	Start	January 3, 1945	Democratic	Sam Rayburn	Democratic	Harry S. Truman	Franklin D. Roosevelt	Yes
79th Congress	1st session	January 3, 1945 – December 21, 1945	Democratic	Sam Rayburn	Democratic	Vacant (Note: Vacancy due to the death of a President)	Harry S. Truman	Yes
79th Congress	2nd session	January 14, 1946 – August 2, 1946	Democratic	Sam Rayburn	Democratic	Vacant	Harry S. Truman	Yes
79th Congress	End	January 3, 1947	Democratic	Sam Rayburn	Democratic	Vacant	Harry S. Truman	Yes
80th Congress	Start	January 3, 1947	Republican	Joseph W. Martin Jr.	Republican	Vacant	Harry S. Truman	No
80th Congress	1st session	January 3, 1947 – December 19, 1947	Republican	Joseph W. Martin Jr.	Republican	Vacant	Harry S. Truman	No
80th Congress	2nd session	January 6, 1948 – December 31, 1948	Republican	Joseph W. Martin Jr.	Republican	Vacant	Harry S. Truman	No
80th Congress	End	January 3, 1949	Republican	Joseph W. Martin Jr.	Republican	Vacant	Harry S. Truman	No
81st Congress	Start	January 3, 1949	Democratic	Sam Rayburn	Democratic	Alben W. Barkley	Harry S. Truman	Yes
81st Congress	1st session	January 3, 1949 – October 19, 1949	Democratic	Sam Rayburn	Democratic	Alben W. Barkley	Harry S. Truman	Yes
81st Congress	2nd session	January 3, 1950 – January 2, 1951	Democratic	Sam Rayburn	Democratic	Alben W. Barkley	Harry S. Truman	Yes
81st Congress	End	January 3, 1951	Democratic	Sam Rayburn	Democratic	Alben W. Barkley	Harry S. Truman	Yes
82nd Congress	Start	January 3, 1951	Democratic	Sam Rayburn	Democratic	Alben W. Barkley	Harry S. Truman	Yes
82nd Congress	1st session	January 3, 1951 – October 20, 1951	Democratic	Sam Rayburn	Democratic	Alben W. Barkley	Harry S. Truman	Yes
82nd Congress	2nd session	January 8, 1952 – July 7, 1952	Democratic	Sam Rayburn	Democratic	Alben W. Barkley	Harry S. Truman	Yes
82nd Congress	End	January 3, 1953	Democratic	Sam Rayburn	Democratic	Alben W. Barkley	Harry S. Truman	Yes
83rd Congress	Start	January 3, 1953	Republican	Joseph W. Martin Jr.	Republican	Richard Nixon	Dwight D. Eisenhower	Yes
83rd Congress	1st session	January 3, 1953 – August 3, 1953	Republican	Joseph W. Martin Jr.	Republican	Richard Nixon	Dwight D. Eisenhower	Yes
83rd Congress	2nd session	January 6, 1954 – December 2, 1954	Republican	Joseph W. Martin Jr.	Republican	Richard Nixon	Dwight D. Eisenhower	Yes
83rd Congress	End	January 3, 1955	Republican	Joseph W. Martin Jr.	Republican	Richard Nixon	Dwight D. Eisenhower	Yes
84th Congress	Start	January 3, 1955	Democratic	Sam Rayburn (Note: Died while in Office)	Democratic	Richard Nixon	Dwight D. Eisenhower	No
84th Congress	1st session	January 5, 1955 – August 2, 1955	Democratic	Sam Rayburn	Democratic	Richard Nixon	Dwight D. Eisenhower	No
84th Congress	2nd session	January 3, 1956 – July 27, 1956	Democratic	Sam Rayburn	Democratic	Richard Nixon	Dwight D. Eisenhower	No
84th Congress	End	January 3, 1957	Democratic	Sam Rayburn	Democratic	Richard Nixon	Dwight D. Eisenhower	No
85th Congress	Start	January 3, 1957	Democratic	Sam Rayburn	Democratic	Richard Nixon	Dwight D. Eisenhower	No
85th Congress	1st session	January 3, 1957 – August 30, 1957	Democratic	Sam Rayburn	Democratic	Richard Nixon	Dwight D. Eisenhower	No
85th Congress	2nd session	January 7, 1958 – August 24, 1958	Democratic	Sam Rayburn	Democratic	Richard Nixon	Dwight D. Eisenhower	No
85th Congress	End	January 3, 1959	Democratic	Sam Rayburn	Democratic	Richard Nixon	Dwight D. Eisenhower	No
86th Congress	Start	January 3, 1959	Democratic	Sam Rayburn	Democratic	Richard Nixon	Dwight D. Eisenhower	No
86th Congress	1st session	January 7, 1959 – September 15, 1959	Democratic	Sam Rayburn	Democratic	Richard Nixon	Dwight D. Eisenhower	No
86th Congress	2nd session	January 6, 1960 – September 1, 1960	Democratic	Sam Rayburn	Democratic	Richard Nixon	Dwight D. Eisenhower	No
86th Congress	End	January 3, 1961	Democratic	Sam Rayburn	Democratic	Richard Nixon	Dwight D. Eisenhower	No
87th Congress	Start	January 3, 1961	Democratic	Sam Rayburn	Democratic	Lyndon B. Johnson	John F. Kennedy (Note: Succession of Presidency due to Death)	Yes
87th Congress	1st session	January 3, 1961 – September 27, 1961	Democratic	Sam Rayburn	Democratic	Lyndon B. Johnson	John F. Kennedy	Yes
87th Congress	2nd session	January 10, 1962 – October 13, 1962	Democratic	John W. McCormack	Democratic	Lyndon B. Johnson	John F. Kennedy	Yes
87th Congress	End	January 3, 1963	Democratic	John W. McCormack	Democratic	Lyndon B. Johnson	John F. Kennedy	Yes
88th Congress	Start	January 3, 1963	Democratic	John W. McCormack	Democratic	Lyndon B. Johnson	John F. Kennedy	Yes
88th Congress	1st session	January 9, 1963 – December 30, 1963	Democratic	John W. McCormack	Democratic	Vacant (Note: Vacancy due to the death of a President)	Lyndon B. Johnson	Yes
88th Congress	2nd session	January 7, 1964 – October 3, 1964	Democratic	John W. McCormack	Democratic	Vacant	Lyndon B. Johnson	Yes
88th Congress	End	January 3, 1965	Democratic	John W. McCormack	Democratic	Vacant	Lyndon B. Johnson	Yes
89th Congress	Start	January 3, 1965	Democratic	John W. McCormack	Democratic	Vacant	Lyndon B. Johnson	Yes
89th Congress	1st session	January 4, 1965 – October 23, 1965	Democratic	John W. McCormack	Democratic	Vacant	Lyndon B. Johnson	Yes
89th Congress	2nd session	January 10, 1966 – October 22, 1966	Democratic	John W. McCormack	Democratic	Vacant	Lyndon B. Johnson	Yes
89th Congress	End	January 3, 1967	Democratic	John W. McCormack	Democratic	Vacant	Lyndon B. Johnson	Yes
90th Congress	Start	January 3, 1967	Democratic	John W. McCormack	Democratic	Vacant	Lyndon B. Johnson	Yes
90th Congress	1st session	January 10, 1967 – December 15, 1967	Democratic	John W. McCormack	Democratic	Vacant	Lyndon B. Johnson	Yes
90th Congress	2nd session	January 15, 1968 – October 14, 1968	Democratic	John W. McCormack	Democratic	Vacant	Lyndon B. Johnson	Yes
90th Congress	End	January 3, 1969	Democratic	John W. McCormack	Democratic	Vacant	Lyndon B. Johnson	Yes
91st Congress	Start	January 3, 1969	Democratic	John W. McCormack	Democratic	Spiro Agnew	Richard Nixon (Note: Succession of Presidency due to Resignation)	No
91st Congress	1st session	January 3, 1969 – December 23, 1969	Democratic	John W. McCormack	Democratic	Spiro Agnew	Richard Nixon	No
91st Congress	2nd session	January 19, 1970 – January 2, 1971	Democratic	John W. McCormack	Democratic	Spiro Agnew	Richard Nixon	No
91st Congress	End	January 3, 1971	Democratic	John W. McCormack	Democratic	Spiro Agnew	Richard Nixon	No
92nd Congress	Start	January 3, 1971	Democratic	Carl Albert	Democratic	Spiro Agnew	Richard Nixon	No
92nd Congress	1st session	January 21, 1971 – December 17, 1971	Democratic	Carl Albert	Democratic	Spiro Agnew	Richard Nixon	No
92nd Congress	2nd session	January 18, 1972 – October 18, 1972	Democratic	Carl Albert	Democratic	Spiro Agnew	Richard Nixon	No
92nd Congress	End	January 3, 1973	Democratic	Carl Albert	Democratic	Spiro Agnew	Richard Nixon	No
93rd Congress	Start	January 3, 1973	Democratic	Carl Albert	Democratic	Spiro Agnew	Richard Nixon	No
93rd Congress	1st session	January 3, 1973 – December 22, 1973	Democratic	Carl Albert	Democratic	Vacant (Note: Vacancy due to Resignation)	Richard Nixon	No
93rd Congress	2nd session	January 21, 1974 – December 20, 1974	Democratic	Carl Albert	Democratic	Gerald Ford	Richard Nixon	No
93rd Congress	End	January 3, 1975	Democratic	Carl Albert	Democratic	Vacant (Note: Vacancy due to the Resignation of the President)	Gerald Ford	No
93rd Congress	End	January 3, 1975	Democratic	Carl Albert	Democratic	Nelson Rockefeller	Gerald Ford	No
94th Congress	Start	January 3, 1975	Democratic	Carl Albert	Democratic	Nelson Rockefeller	Gerald Ford	No
94th Congress	1st session	January 14, 1975 – December 19, 1975	Democratic	Carl Albert	Democratic	Nelson Rockefeller	Gerald Ford	No
94th Congress	2nd session	January 19, 1976 – October 1, 1976	Democratic	Carl Albert	Democratic	Nelson Rockefeller	Gerald Ford	No
94th Congress	End	January 3, 1977	Democratic	Carl Albert	Democratic	Nelson Rockefeller	Gerald Ford	No
95th Congress	Start	January 3, 1977	Democratic	Tip O'Neill	Democratic	Walter Mondale	Jimmy Carter	Yes
95th Congress	1st session	January 4, 1977 – December 15, 1977	Democratic	Tip O'Neill	Democratic	Walter Mondale	Jimmy Carter	Yes
95th Congress	2nd session	January 19, 1978 – October 15, 1978	Democratic	Tip O'Neill	Democratic	Walter Mondale	Jimmy Carter	Yes
95th Congress	End	January 3, 1979	Democratic	Tip O'Neill	Democratic	Walter Mondale	Jimmy Carter	Yes
96th Congress	Start	January 3, 1979	Democratic	Tip O'Neill	Democratic	Walter Mondale	Jimmy Carter	Yes
96th Congress	1st session	January 15, 1979 – January 3, 1980	Democratic	Tip O'Neill	Democratic	Walter Mondale	Jimmy Carter	Yes
96th Congress	2nd session	January 3, 1980 – December 16, 1980	Democratic	Tip O'Neill	Democratic	Walter Mondale	Jimmy Carter	Yes
96th Congress	End	January 3, 1981	Democratic	Tip O'Neill	Democratic	Walter Mondale	Jimmy Carter	Yes
97th Congress	Start	January 3, 1981	Democratic	Tip O'Neill	Republican	George H. W. Bush	Ronald Reagan	No
97th Congress	1st session	January 5, 1981 – December 16, 1981	Democratic	Tip O'Neill	Republican	George H. W. Bush	Ronald Reagan	No
97th Congress	2nd session	January 25, 1982 – December 23, 1982	Democratic	Tip O'Neill	Republican	George H. W. Bush	Ronald Reagan	No
97th Congress	End	January 3, 1983	Democratic	Tip O'Neill	Republican	George H. W. Bush	Ronald Reagan	No
98th Congress	Start	January 3, 1983	Democratic	Tip O'Neill	Republican	George H. W. Bush	Ronald Reagan	No
98th Congress	1st session	January 3, 1983 – November 18, 1983	Democratic	Tip O'Neill	Republican	George H. W. Bush	Ronald Reagan	No
98th Congress	2nd session	January 23, 1984 – October 12, 1984	Democratic	Tip O'Neill	Republican	George H. W. Bush	Ronald Reagan	No
98th Congress	End	January 3, 1985	Democratic	Tip O'Neill	Republican	George H. W. Bush	Ronald Reagan	No
99th Congress	Start	January 3, 1985	Democratic	Tip O'Neill	Republican	George H. W. Bush	Ronald Reagan	No
99th Congress	1st session	January 3, 1985 – December 20, 1985	Democratic	Tip O'Neill	Republican	George H. W. Bush	Ronald Reagan	No
99th Congress	2nd session	January 21, 1986 – October 18, 1986	Democratic	Tip O'Neill	Republican	George H. W. Bush	Ronald Reagan	No
99th Congress	End	January 3, 1987	Democratic	Tip O'Neill	Republican	George H. W. Bush	Ronald Reagan	No
100th Congress	Start	January 3, 1987	Democratic	Jim Wright (Note: Resigned from Office and left Congress)	Democratic	George H. W. Bush	Ronald Reagan	No
100th Congress	1st session	January 6, 1987 – December 22, 1987	Democratic	Jim Wright	Democratic	George H. W. Bush	Ronald Reagan	No
100th Congress	2nd session	January 25, 1988 – October 22, 1988	Democratic	Jim Wright	Democratic	George H. W. Bush	Ronald Reagan	No
100th Congress	End	January 3, 1989	Democratic	Jim Wright	Democratic	George H. W. Bush	Ronald Reagan	No
101st Congress	Start	January 3, 1989	Democratic	Jim Wright	Democratic	Dan Quayle	George H. W. Bush	No
101st Congress	1st session	January 3, 1989 – November 22, 1989	Democratic	Jim Wright	Democratic	Dan Quayle	George H. W. Bush	No
101st Congress	2nd session	January 23, 1990 – October 28, 1990	Democratic	Tom Foley	Democratic	Dan Quayle	George H. W. Bush	No
101st Congress	End	January 3, 1991	Democratic	Tom Foley	Democratic	Dan Quayle	George H. W. Bush	No
102nd Congress	Start	January 3, 1991	Democratic	Tom Foley	Democratic	Dan Quayle	George H. W. Bush	No
102nd Congress	1st session	January 3, 1991 – January 3, 1992	Democratic	Tom Foley	Democratic	Dan Quayle	George H. W. Bush	No
102nd Congress	2nd session	January 3, 1992 – October 9, 1992	Democratic	Tom Foley	Democratic	Dan Quayle	George H. W. Bush	No
102nd Congress	End	January 3, 1993	Democratic	Tom Foley	Democratic	Dan Quayle	George H. W. Bush	No
103rd Congress	Start	January 3, 1993	Democratic	Tom Foley	Democratic	Al Gore	Bill Clinton	Yes
103rd Congress	1st session	January 5, 1993 – November 26, 1993	Democratic	Tom Foley	Democratic	Al Gore	Bill Clinton	Yes
103rd Congress	2nd session	January 25, 1994 – December 1, 1994	Democratic	Tom Foley	Democratic	Al Gore	Bill Clinton	Yes
103rd Congress	End	January 3, 1995	Democratic	Tom Foley	Democratic	Al Gore	Bill Clinton	Yes
104th Congress	Start	January 3, 1995	Republican	Newt Gingrich (Note: Resigned from Office and left Congress)	Republican	Al Gore	Bill Clinton	No
104th Congress	1st session	January 4, 1995 – January 3, 1996	Republican	Newt Gingrich	Republican	Al Gore	Bill Clinton	No
104th Congress	2nd session	January 3, 1996 – October 4, 1996	Republican	Newt Gingrich	Republican	Al Gore	Bill Clinton	No
104th Congress	End	January 3, 1997	Republican	Newt Gingrich	Republican	Al Gore	Bill Clinton	No
105th Congress	Start	January 3, 1997	Republican	Newt Gingrich	Republican	Al Gore	Bill Clinton	No
105th Congress	1st session	January 7, 1997 – November 13, 1997	Republican	Newt Gingrich	Republican	Al Gore	Bill Clinton	No
105th Congress	2nd session	January 27, 1998 – December 19, 1998	Republican	Newt Gingrich	Republican	Al Gore	Bill Clinton	No
105th Congress	End	January 3, 1999	Republican	Newt Gingrich	Republican	Al Gore	Bill Clinton	No
106th Congress	Start	January 3, 1999	Republican	Dennis Hastert	Republican	Al Gore	Bill Clinton	No
106th Congress	1st session	January 6, 1999 – November 22, 1999	Republican	Dennis Hastert	Republican	Al Gore	Bill Clinton	No
106th Congress	2nd session	January 24, 2000 – December 15, 2000	Republican	Dennis Hastert	Republican	Al Gore	Bill Clinton	No
106th Congress	End	January 3, 2001	Republican	Dennis Hastert	Republican	Al Gore	Bill Clinton	No
107th Congress	Start	January 3, 2001	Republican	Dennis Hastert	Democratic	Dick Cheney	George W. Bush	Yes/No
107th Congress	1st session	January 3, 2001 – December 20, 2001	Republican	Dennis Hastert	Democratic	Dick Cheney	George W. Bush	Yes/No
107th Congress	2nd session	January 23, 2002 – November 22, 2002	Republican	Dennis Hastert	Republican	Dick Cheney	George W. Bush	Yes/No
107th Congress	End	January 3, 2003	Republican	Dennis Hastert	Democratic	Dick Cheney	George W. Bush	Yes/No
108th Congress	Start	January 3, 2003	Republican	Dennis Hastert	Republican	Dick Cheney	George W. Bush	Yes
108th Congress	1st session	January 7, 2003 – December 9, 2003	Republican	Dennis Hastert	Republican	Dick Cheney	George W. Bush	Yes
108th Congress	2nd session	January 20, 2004 – December 8, 2004	Republican	Dennis Hastert	Republican	Dick Cheney	George W. Bush	Yes
108th Congress	End	January 3, 2005	Republican	Dennis Hastert	Republican	Dick Cheney	George W. Bush	Yes
109th Congress	Start	January 3, 2005	Republican	Dennis Hastert	Republican	Dick Cheney	George W. Bush	Yes
109th Congress	1st session	January 4, 2005 – December 22, 2005	Republican	Dennis Hastert	Republican	Dick Cheney	George W. Bush	Yes
109th Congress	2nd session	January 3, 2006 – December 9, 2006	Republican	Dennis Hastert	Republican	Dick Cheney	George W. Bush	Yes
109th Congress	End	January 3, 2007	Republican	Dennis Hastert	Republican	Dick Cheney	George W. Bush	Yes
110th Congress	Start	January 3, 2007	Democratic	Nancy Pelosi	Democratic	Dick Cheney	George W. Bush	No
110th Congress	1st session	January 4, 2007 – December 19, 2007	Democratic	Nancy Pelosi	Democratic	Dick Cheney	George W. Bush	No
110th Congress	2nd session	January 3, 2008 – January 3, 2009	Democratic	Nancy Pelosi	Democratic	Dick Cheney	George W. Bush	No
110th Congress	End	January 3, 2009	Democratic	Nancy Pelosi	Democratic	Dick Cheney	George W. Bush	No
111th Congress	Start	January 3, 2009	Democratic	Nancy Pelosi	Democratic	Joe Biden	Barack Obama	Yes
111th Congress	1st session	January 6, 2009 – December 24, 2009	Democratic	Nancy Pelosi	Democratic	Joe Biden	Barack Obama	Yes
111th Congress	2nd session	January 5, 2010 – December 22, 2010	Democratic	Nancy Pelosi	Democratic	Joe Biden	Barack Obama	Yes
111th Congress	End	January 3, 2011	Democratic	Nancy Pelosi	Democratic	Joe Biden	Barack Obama	Yes
112th Congress	Start	January 3, 2011	Republican	John Boehner (Note: Resigned from Office and left Congress)	Democratic	Joe Biden	Barack Obama	No
112th Congress	1st session	January 5, 2011 – January 3, 2012	Republican	John Boehner	Democratic	Joe Biden	Barack Obama	No
112th Congress	2nd session	January 3, 2012 – January 3, 2013	Republican	John Boehner	Democratic	Joe Biden	Barack Obama	No
112th Congress	End	January 3, 2013	Republican	John Boehner	Democratic	Joe Biden	Barack Obama	No
113th Congress	Start	January 3, 2013	Republican	John Boehner	Democratic	Joe Biden	Barack Obama	No
113th Congress	1st session	January 3, 2013 – December 26, 2013	Republican	John Boehner	Democratic	Joe Biden	Barack Obama	No
113th Congress	2nd session	January 3, 2014 – December 16, 2014	Republican	John Boehner	Democratic	Joe Biden	Barack Obama	No
113th Congress	End	January 3, 2015	Republican	John Boehner	Democratic	Joe Biden	Barack Obama	No
114th Congress	Start	January 3, 2015	Republican	John Boehner	Republican	Joe Biden	Barack Obama	No
114th Congress	1st session	January 6, 2015 – December 18, 2015	Republican	John Boehner	Republican	Joe Biden	Barack Obama	No
114th Congress	2nd session	January 4, 2016 – January 3, 2017	Republican	Paul Ryan	Republican	Joe Biden	Barack Obama	No
114th Congress	End	January 3, 2017	Republican	Paul Ryan	Republican	Joe Biden	Barack Obama	No
115th Congress	Start	January 3, 2017	Republican	Paul Ryan	Republican	Mike Pence	Donald Trump	Yes
115th Congress	1st session	January 3, 2017 – January 3, 2018	Republican	Paul Ryan	Republican	Mike Pence	Donald Trump	Yes
115th Congress	2nd session	January 3, 2018 – January 3, 2019	Republican	Paul Ryan	Republican	Mike Pence	Donald Trump	Yes
115th Congress	End	January 3, 2019	Republican	Paul Ryan	Republican	Mike Pence	Donald Trump	Yes
116th Congress	Start	January 3, 2019	Democratic	Nancy Pelosi	Republican	Mike Pence	Donald Trump	No
116th Congress	1st session	January 3, 2019 – January 3, 2020	Democratic	Nancy Pelosi	Republican	Mike Pence	Donald Trump	No
116th Congress	2nd session	January 3, 2020 – January 3, 2021	Democratic	Nancy Pelosi	Republican	Mike Pence	Donald Trump	No
116th Congress	End	January 3, 2021	Democratic	Nancy Pelosi	Republican	Mike Pence	Donald Trump	No
117th Congress	Start	January 3, 2021	Democratic	Nancy Pelosi	Republican	Kamala Harris	Joe Biden	Yes
117th Congress	1st session	January 3, 2021 – January 3, 2022	Democratic	Nancy Pelosi	Republican	Kamala Harris	Joe Biden	Yes
117th Congress	2nd session	January 3, 2022 – January 3, 2023	Democratic	Nancy Pelosi	Democratic	Kamala Harris	Joe Biden	Yes
117th Congress	End	January 3, 2023	Democratic	Nancy Pelosi	Democratic	Kamala Harris	Joe Biden	Yes
118th Congress	Start	January 3, 2023	Republican	Kevin McCarthy (Note: Force to Vacate Seat by Vote)	Democratic	Kamala Harris	Joe Biden	No
118th Congress	1st session	January 3, 2023 – January 3, 2024	Republican	Kevin McCarthy	Democratic	Kamala Harris	Joe Biden	No
118th Congress	2nd session	January 3, 2024 – January 3, 2025	Republican	Mike Johnson	Democratic	Kamala Harris	Joe Biden	No
118th Congress	End	January 3, 2025	Republican	Mike Johnson	Democratic	Kamala Harris	Joe Biden	No
119th Congress	Start	January 3, 2025	Republican	Mike Johnson	Republican	JD Vance	Donald Trump	Yes
119th Congress	1st session	January 3, 2025 – January 3, 2026	Republican	Mike Johnson	Republican	JD Vance	Donald Trump	Yes
119th Congress	2nd session	January 3, 2026 – present	Republican	Mike Johnson	Republican	JD Vance	Donald Trump	Yes
119th Congress	End	January 3, 2027	Republican	Mike Johnson	Republican	JD Vance	Donald Trump	Yes

== Next Congress ==
Next Congress	Session	Session dates	House		Senate		President	Trifecta
Next Congress	Session	Session dates	House control	Speaker	Senate control	Vice President	President	Trifecta
120th Congress	Start	January 3, 2027	Democratic	TBD	Democratic	JD Vance	Donald Trump	No
120th Congress	End	TBD	Democratic	TBD	Democratic	JD Vance	Donald Trump	No

== See also ==
- History of the United States Senate
- Party divisions of United States Congresses
- Timeline of Washington, D.C. – Major events in the history of the city of Washington, District of Columbia
