= Henry T. Rainey Farm =

- U.S. National Register of Historic Places
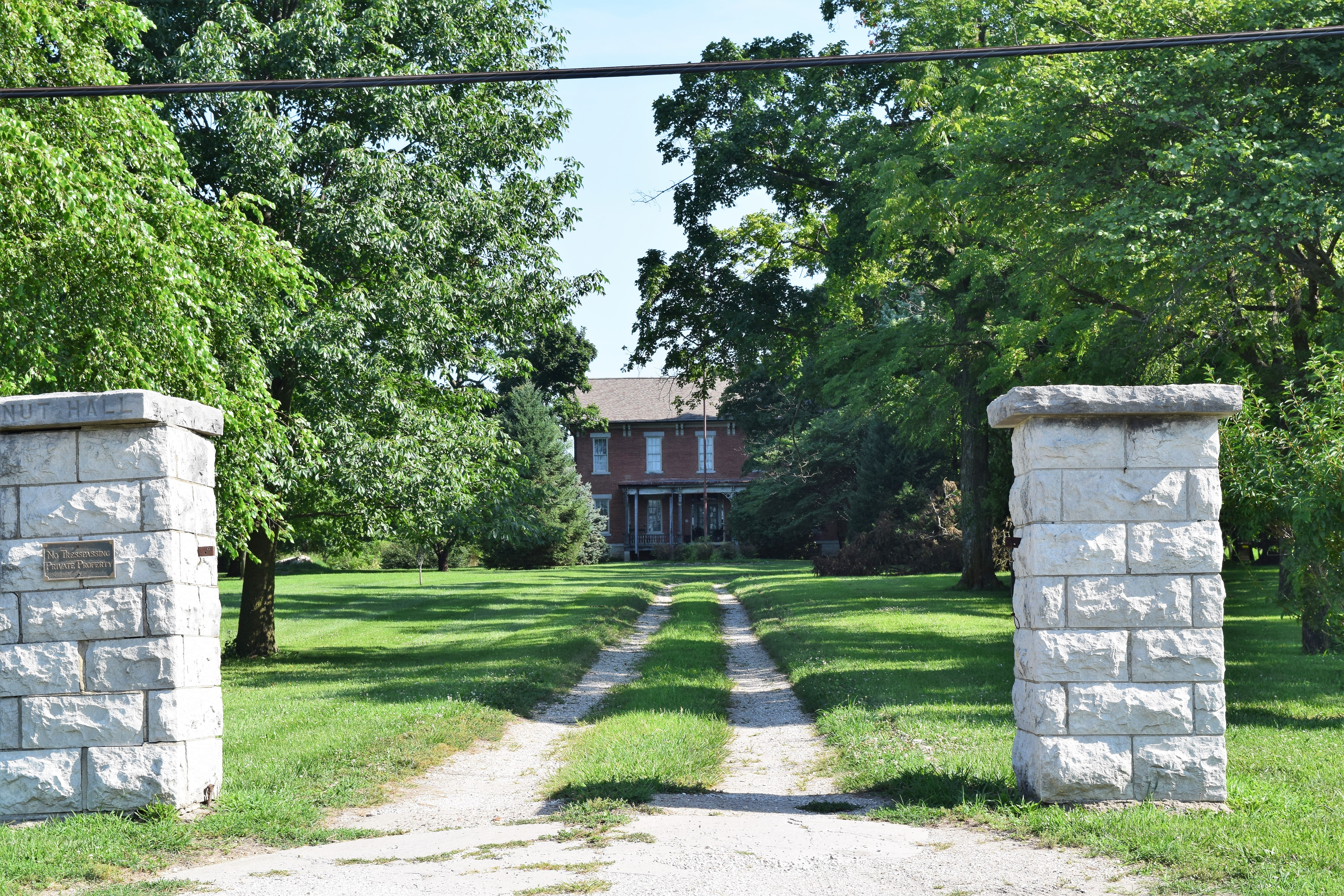

- Location within Illinois
- Location: Greene County, Illinois
- Nearest city: Carrollton
- Coordinates: 39°18′12″N 90°23′14″W
- Area: 425 acres (172 ha)
- Built: 1868-70
- Architectural style: Greek Revival, Italianate
- NRHP reference No.: 87000682
- Added to NRHP: May 12, 1987

The Henry T. Rainey Farm, also known as Walnut Hall Estate, is a historic farm and wedding venue located on the north side of Illinois Route 108 in Greene County, Illinois, east of Carrollton. The main farmhouse, known as Walnut Hall, was built in 1868-70 by settler Luman Curtius. The red brick house features Greek Revival and Italianate influences. Politician Henry Thomas Rainey bought the farm in 1909. Rainey served in the U.S. House of Representatives from 1903 to 1921, and again from 1923 to his death in 1934; during his last two years in office, he was Speaker of the House. As Speaker of the House, Rainey presided over the passage of New Deal legislation during President Franklin D. Roosevelt's Hundred Days; as a representative, he promoted causes such as environmental conservation and agricultural aid programs. In 2020, Brittany and Bobby Weller acquired the property, converting it into an all-inclusive wedding venue which opened the following year.

The farm was added to the National Register of Historic Places on May 12, 1987.
