= Henry T. Rainey =

American politician (1860–1934)

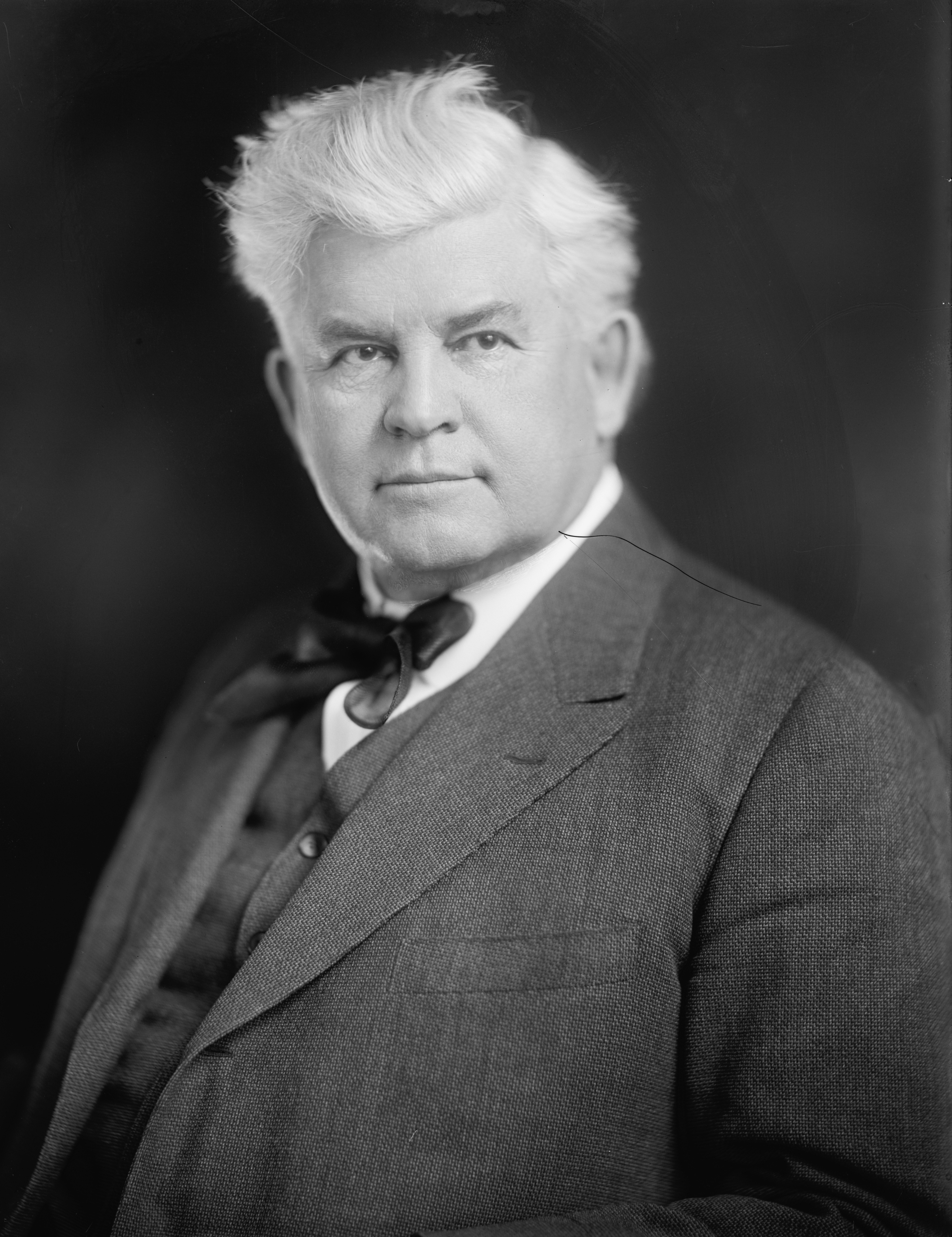
- Rainey, 1905–1934

40th Speaker of the United States House of Representatives
- In office March 9, 1933 – August 19, 1934
- Preceded by: John Nance Garner
- Succeeded by: Jo Byrns

Leader of the House Democratic Caucus
- In office March 9, 1933 – August 19, 1934
- Preceded by: John Nance Garner
- Succeeded by: Jo Byrns

House Majority Leader
- In office December 7, 1931 – March 3, 1933
- Preceded by: John Q. Tilson
- Succeeded by: Jo Byrns

Member of the U.S. House of Representatives from Illinois's 20th district
- In office March 4, 1923 – August 19, 1934
- Preceded by: Guy L. Shaw
- Succeeded by: Scott W. Lucas
- In office March 4, 1903 – March 3, 1921
- Preceded by: James R. Williams
- Succeeded by: Guy L. Shaw

Personal details
- Born: August 20, 1860 Carrollton, Illinois, U.S.
- Died: August 19, 1934 (aged 73) St. Louis, Missouri, U.S.
- Party: Democratic
- Education: Knox College; Amherst College; Northwestern University

Henry Thomas Rainey (August 20, 1860 – August 19, 1934) was an American politician. A member of the Democratic Party from Illinois, he served in the United States House of Representatives from 1903 to 1921 and from 1923 to his death in 1934. He rose to Speaker of the House, during the famous Hundred days of Franklin D. Roosevelt in 1933.

== Biography ==
=== Early years ===
Rainey attended the public schools and Knox Academy and Knox College, Galesburg, Illinois. He transferred to, and graduated from Amherst College in 1883 and then the Northwestern University School of Law, in Chicago which he graduated in 1885. He was admitted to the bar in 1885 and commenced practice in Carrollton, Illinois.

=== Political career ===
Rainey was appointed master in chancery for Greene County, Illinois, from 1887 until 1895, when he resigned, and returned to private practice. He then decided to return to politics in 1902 getting elected to Congress and serving for nine terms before losing to Guy L. Shaw in 1920. Two years later, he won back his seat and served until his death. The 1903 Congressional Directory notes that Rainey "belongs to the Knights of Pythias, the Independent Order of Odd Fellows, the Modern Woodmen, the Mutual Protective League, and the Elks."

=== Leadership ===
Due to the Great Depression, the Republican Party lost its majority in a landslide which elevated John Nance Garner to the Speakership. Rainey ran for and defeated John McDuffie for the Majority Leader position. McDuffie ultimately remained as Majority Whip.

=== Speaker of the House ===
Statue of Henry T. Rainey, north of Carrollton, Illinois

With Speaker Garner having been inaugurated Vice President on March 4, 1933, Rainey, being next in line, was elected Speaker of the House when President Roosevelt called a special session of Congress two days later. Rainey gave the Roosevelt administration carte blanche to do whatever it wanted, allowing almost the entire New Deal to be passed with little or no changes.

More reforms were passed during the regular session starting December. Rainey died of a heart attack the following summer, on the eve of his seventy-fourth birthday, before the new Congress could meet.

== See also ==
- Henry T. Rainey Farm
- List of members of the United States Congress who died in office (1900–1949)

U.S. House of Representatives
Preceded by James R. Williams	Member of the U.S. House of Representatives from Illinois's 20th congressional district 1903–1921	Succeeded by Guy L. Shaw
Preceded by Guy L. Shaw	Member of the U.S. House of Representatives from Illinois's 20th congressional district 1923–1934	Succeeded by Scott W. Lucas
Preceded by John Nance Garner	Speaker of the U.S. House of Representatives; March 9, 1933 – August 19, 1934	Succeeded by Joseph W. Byrns
Party political offices
Preceded by John Q. Tilson	Majority Leader of the United States House of Representatives; December 7, 1931 – March 3, 1933	Succeeded by Joseph W. Byrns
