= Raney House (Rogers, Arkansas) =

Historic house in Arkansas, United States

- U.S. National Register of Historic Places
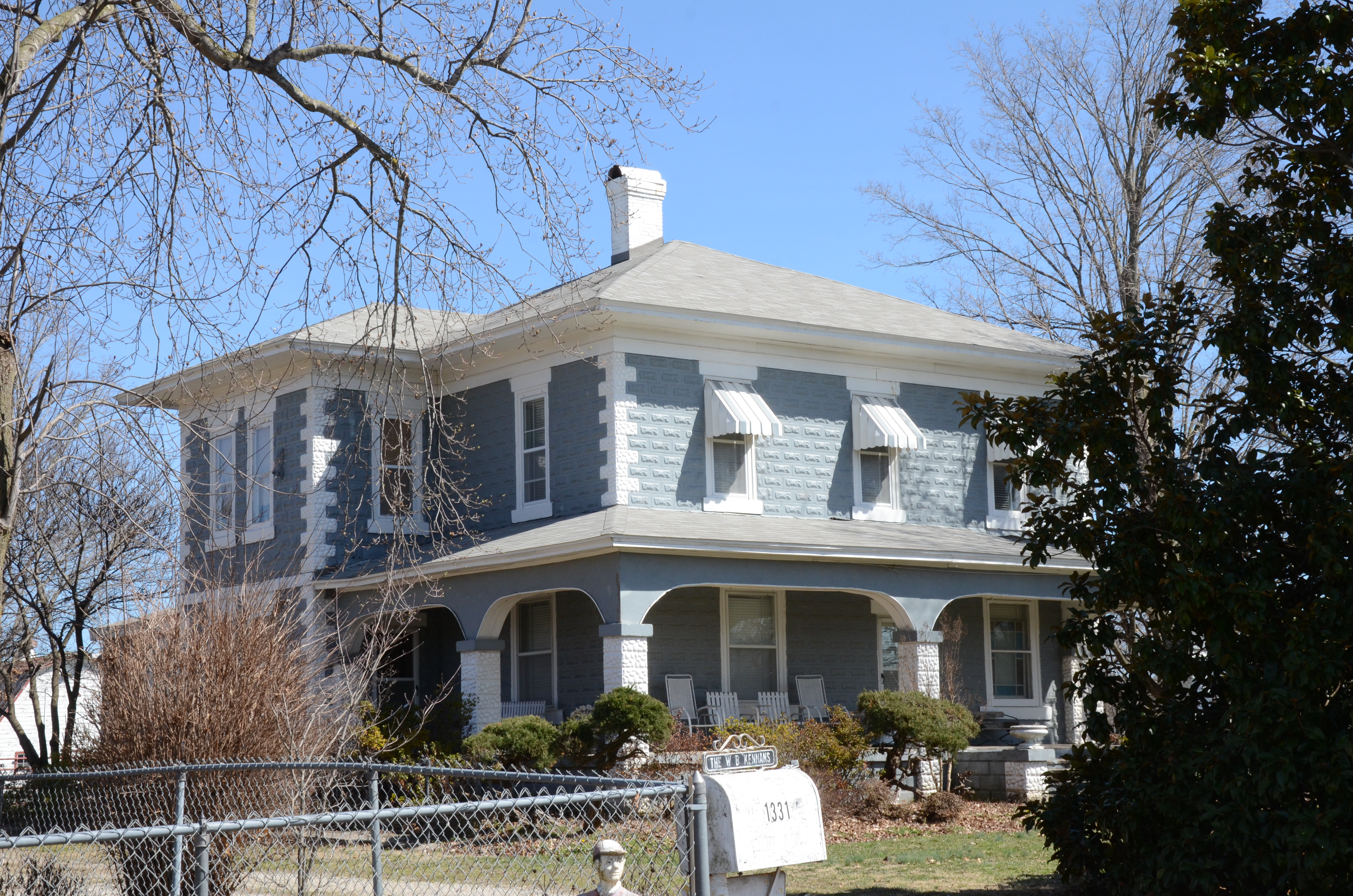

- Location within Arkansas Location within the United States
- Location: 1331 Monte Ne, Rogers, Arkansas
- Coordinates: 36°19′10″N 94°6′21″W
- Area: less than one acre
- Built: 1912
- MPS: Benton County MRA
- NRHP reference No.: 87002403
- Added to NRHP: January 28, 1988

The Raney House is a historic house at 1331 Monte Ne Road in Rogers, Arkansas. It is a two-story American Foursquare house, with a hip roof and a wraparound porch. It was built c. 1912 out of rusticated concrete blocks, a building material popular in the area for residential construction in the area between 1910 and 1925. This house is one of the most elaborate built from them in the area, with curved architraves between the porch columns and corners quoined with smooth blocks to highlight their appearance.

The house was listed on the National Register of Historic Places in 1988.

== See also ==
- National Register of Historic Places listings in Benton County, Arkansas
