= List of United States representatives in the 59th Congress =

This is a complete list of United States representatives during the 59th United States Congress listed by seniority.

As an historical article, the districts and party affiliations listed reflect those during the 59th Congress (March 4, 1905 – March 3, 1907). Seats and party affiliations on similar lists for other congresses will be different for certain members.

Seniority depends on the date on which members were sworn into office. Since many members are sworn in on the same day, subsequent ranking is based on previous congressional service of the individual and then by alphabetical order by the last name of the representative.

Committee chairmanship in the House is often associated with seniority. However, party leadership is typically not associated with seniority.

Note: The "*" indicates that the representative/delegate may have served one or more non-consecutive terms while in the House of Representatives of the United States Congress.

== U.S. House seniority list ==
U.S. House seniority
Rank	Representative	Party	District	Seniority date (Previous service, if any)	No.# of term(s)	Notes
1	Henry H. Bingham	R	PA-01	March 4, 1879	14th term	Dean of the House
2	Robert R. Hitt	R	IL-13	December 4, 1882	13th term	Died on September 20, 1906.
3	John H. Bankhead	D	AL-06	March 4, 1887	10th term	Left the House in 1907.
4	John Dalzell	R	PA-30	March 4, 1887	10th term	
5	Samuel Matthews Robertson	D	LA-06	December 5, 1887	10th term	Left the House in 1907.
6	Rufus E. Lester	D	GA-01	March 4, 1889	9th term	Died on June 16, 1906.
7	George W. Smith	R	IL-25	March 4, 1889	9th term	
8	Sereno E. Payne	R	NY-31	December 2, 1889; Previous service, 1883–1887.	11th term*	
9	David A. De Armond	D	MO-06	March 4, 1891	8th term	
10	William Atkinson Jones	D	VA-01	March 4, 1891	8th term	
11	John A. T. Hull	R	IA-07	March 4, 1891	8th term	
12	Leonidas F. Livingston	D	GA-05	March 4, 1891	8th term	
13	Adolph Meyer	D	LA-01	March 4, 1891	8th term	
14	James Wolcott Wadsworth	R	NY-34	March 4, 1891; Previous service, 1881–1885.	10th term*	Left the House in 1907.
15	Joseph W. Babcock	R	WI-03	March 4, 1893	7th term	Left the House in 1907.
16	Richard Bartholdt	R	MO-10	March 4, 1893	7th term	
17	Joseph Gurney Cannon	R	IL-18	March 4, 1893; Previous service, 1873–1891.	16th term*	Speaker of the House
18	Henry Allen Cooper	R	WI-01	March 4, 1893	7th term	
19	Robert G. Cousins	R	IA-05	March 4, 1893	7th term	
20	Charles Curtis	R	KS-01	March 4, 1893	7th term	Resigned on January 28, 1907.
21	John J. Gardner	R	NJ-02	March 4, 1893	7th term	
22	Charles H. Grosvenor	R	OH-11	March 4, 1893; Previous service, 1885–1891.	10th term*	Left the House in 1907.
23	Frederick H. Gillett	R	MA-02	March 4, 1893	7th term	
24	William Peters Hepburn	R	IA-08	March 4, 1893; Previous service, 1881–1887.	10th term*	
25	John F. Lacey	R	IA-06	March 4, 1893; Previous service, 1889–1891.	8th term*	Left the House in 1907.
26	Henry C. Loudenslager	R	NJ-01	March 4, 1893	7th term	
27	Thaddeus Maclay Mahon	R	PA-17	March 4, 1893	7th term	Left the House in 1907.
28	Samuel W. McCall	R	MA-08	March 4, 1893	7th term	
29	James McCleary	R	MN-02	March 4, 1893	7th term	Left the House in 1907.
30	James S. Sherman	R	NY-27	March 4, 1893; Previous service, 1887–1891.	9th term*	
31	Claude A. Swanson	D	VA-05	March 4, 1893	7th term	Resigned on January 30, 1906.
32	James Albertus Tawney	R	MN-01	March 4, 1893	7th term	
33	Irving Price Wanger	R	PA-07	March 4, 1893	7th term	
34	John Sharp Williams	D	MS-08	March 4, 1893	7th term	
35	Robert Adams, Jr.	R	PA-02	December 19, 1893	7th term	Died on June 1, 1906.
36	John Sebastian Little	D	AR-04	December 3, 1894	7th term	Resigned on January 14, 1907.
37	Ernest F. Acheson	R	PA-24	March 4, 1895	6th term	
38	Charles Lafayette Bartlett	D	GA-06	March 4, 1895	6th term	
39	Roswell P. Bishop	R	MI-09	March 4, 1895	6th term	Left the House in 1907.
40	Theodore E. Burton	R	OH-21	March 4, 1895; Previous service, 1889–1891.	7th term*	
41	Alston G. Dayton	R	WV-02	March 4, 1895	6th term	Resigned on March 16, 1905.
42	Blackburn B. Dovener	R	WV-01	March 4, 1895	6th term	Left the House in 1907.
43	George Edmund Foss	R	IL-10	March 4, 1895	6th term	
44	Charles N. Fowler	R	NJ-05	March 4, 1895	6th term	
45	Joseph V. Graff	R	IL-16	March 4, 1895	6th term	
46	E. Stevens Henry	R	CT-01	March 4, 1895	6th term	
47	Ebenezer J. Hill	R	CT-04	March 4, 1895	6th term	
48	Benjamin Franklin Howell	R	NJ-03	March 4, 1895	6th term	
49	John J. Jenkins	R	WI-11	March 4, 1895	6th term	
50	Edward S. Minor	R	WI-09	March 4, 1895	6th term	Left the House in 1907.
51	Theobald Otjen	R	WI-04	March 4, 1895	6th term	Left the House in 1907.
52	Jesse Overstreet	R	IN-07	March 4, 1895	6th term	
53	Richard W. Parker	R	NJ-07	March 4, 1895	6th term	
54	William Alden Smith	R	MI-05	March 4, 1895	6th term	Resigned on February 9, 1907.
55	Stephen M. Sparkman	D	FL-01	March 4, 1895	6th term	
56	Nehemiah D. Sperry	R	CT-02	March 4, 1895	6th term	
57	James H. Southard	R	OH-09	March 4, 1895	6th term	Left the House in 1907.
58	Cyrus A. Sulloway	R	NH-01	March 4, 1895	6th term	
59	William Sulzer	D	NY-10	March 4, 1895	6th term	
60	George W. Prince	R	IL-15	December 2, 1895	6th term	
61	William C. Adamson	D	GA-04	March 4, 1897	5th term	
62	De Alva S. Alexander	R	NY-36	March 4, 1897	5th term	
63	William Gordon Brantley	D	GA-11	March 4, 1897	5th term	
64	Robert F. Broussard	D	LA-03	March 4, 1897	5th term	
65	Walter Brownlow	R	TN-01	March 4, 1897	5th term	
66	Stephen Brundidge, Jr.	D	AR-02	March 4, 1897	5th term	
67	Thomas S. Butler	R	PA-08	March 4, 1897	5th term	
68	Adin B. Capron	R	RI-02	March 4, 1897	5th term	
69	Champ Clark	D	MO-09	March 4, 1897; Previous service, 1893–1895.	6th term*	
70	Henry De Lamar Clayton, Jr.	D	AL-03	March 4, 1897	5th term	
71	Edgar D. Crumpacker	R	IN-10	March 4, 1897	5th term	
72	Robert C. Davey	D	LA-02	March 4, 1897; Previous service, 1893–1895.	6th term*	
73	James H. Davidson	R	WI-08	March 4, 1897	5th term	
74	John W. Gaines	D	TN-06	March 4, 1897	5th term	
75	James M. Griggs	D	GA-02	March 4, 1897	5th term	
76	Edward L. Hamilton	R	MI-04	March 4, 1897	5th term	
77	James Hay	D	VA-07	March 4, 1897	5th term	
78	Robert Lee Henry	D	TX-11	March 4, 1897	5th term	
79	William Marcellus Howard	D	GA-08	March 4, 1897	5th term	
80	John H. Ketcham	R	NY-21	March 4, 1897; Previous service, 1865–1873 and 1877–1893.	17th term**	Died on November 4, 1906.
81	William Walton Kitchin	D	NC-05	March 4, 1897	5th term	
82	John Lamb	D	VA-03	March 4, 1897	5th term	
83	Charles B. Landis	R	IN-09	March 4, 1897	5th term	
84	Elijah B. Lewis	D	GA-03	March 4, 1897	5th term	
85	Lucius Littauer	R	NY-25	March 4, 1897	5th term	Left the House in 1907.
86	William C. Lovering	R	MA-14	March 4, 1897	5th term	
87	James R. Mann	R	IL-02	March 4, 1897	5th term	
88	John A. Moon	D	TN-03	March 4, 1897	5th term	
89	Sydney Emanuel Mudd I	R	MD-05	March 4, 1897; Previous service, 1890–1891.	6th term*	
90	Marlin Edgar Olmsted	R	PA-18	March 4, 1897	5th term	
91	John Franklin Rixey	D	VA-08	March 4, 1897	5th term	Died on February 8, 1907.
92	Thetus W. Sims	D	TN-08	March 4, 1897	5th term	
93	James Luther Slayden	D	TX-14	March 4, 1897	5th term	
94	David Highbaugh Smith	D	KY-04	March 4, 1897	5th term	Left the House in 1907.
95	Samuel William Smith	R	MI-06	March 4, 1897	5th term	
96	John Hall Stephens	D	TX-13	March 4, 1897	5th term	
97	Frederick Stevens	R	MN-04	March 4, 1897	5th term	
98	George W. Taylor	D	AL-01	March 4, 1897	5th term	
99	Oscar Underwood	D	AL-09	March 4, 1897; Previous service, 1895–1896.	6th term*	
100	William T. Zenor	D	IN-03	March 4, 1897	5th term	Left the House in 1907.
101	James Tilghman Lloyd	D	MO-01	June 1, 1897	5th term	
102	Edwin C. Burleigh	R	ME-03	June 21, 1897	5th term	
103	George P. Lawrence	R	MA-01	November 2, 1897	5th term	
104	Henry Sherman Boutell	R	IL-09	November 23, 1897	5th term	
105	William S. Greene	R	MA-13	May 31, 1898	5th term	
106	Thomas Spight	D	MS-02	July 5, 1898	5th term	
107	Frank A. McLain	D	MS-07	December 12, 1898	5th term	
108	Justin De Witt Bowersock	R	KS-02	March 4, 1899	4th term	Left the House in 1907.
109	Abraham L. Brick	R	IN-13	March 4, 1899	4th term	
110	Charles H. Burke	R	SD	March 4, 1899	4th term	Left the House in 1907.
111	Elmer Burkett	R	NE-01	March 4, 1899	4th term	Resigned on March 4, 1905.
112	Albert S. Burleson	D	TX-10	March 4, 1899	4th term	
113	John L. Burnett	D	AL-07	March 4, 1899	4th term	
114	William A. Calderhead	R	KS-05	March 4, 1899; Previous service, 1895–1897.	5th term*	
115	George W. Cromer	R	IN-08	March 4, 1899	4th term	Left the House in 1907.
116	Francis W. Cushman	R	WA	March 4, 1899	4th term	
117	Michael E. Driscoll	R	NY-29	March 4, 1899	4th term	
118	John J. Esch	R	WI-07	March 4, 1899	4th term	
119	David E. Finley	D	SC-05	March 4, 1899	4th term	
120	John J. Fitzgerald	D	NY-07	March 4, 1899	4th term	
121	Joseph W. Fordney	R	MI-08	March 4, 1899	4th term	
122	Washington Gardner	R	MI-03	March 4, 1899	4th term	
123	George G. Gilbert	D	KY-08	March 4, 1899	4th term	Left the House in 1907.
124	Gilbert N. Haugen	R	IA-04	March 4, 1899	4th term	
125	Thomas Hedge	R	IA-01	March 4, 1899	4th term	Left the House in 1907.
126	Wesley Livsey Jones	R	WA	March 4, 1899	4th term	
127	James Monroe Miller	R	KS-04	March 4, 1899	4th term	
128	Franklin Wheeler Mondell	R	WY	March 4, 1899; Previous service, 1895–1897.	5th term*	
129	James C. Needham	R	CA-06	March 4, 1899	4th term	
130	George Alexander Pearre	R	MD-06	March 4, 1899	4th term	
131	William Augustus Reeder	R	KS-06	March 4, 1899	4th term	
132	Ernest W. Roberts	R	MA-07	March 4, 1899	4th term	
133	William W. Rucker	D	MO-02	March 4, 1899	4th term	
134	Jacob Ruppert	D	NY-16	March 4, 1899	4th term	Left the House in 1907.
135	William H. Ryan	D	NY-35	March 4, 1899	4th term	
136	Joseph C. Sibley	R	PA-28	March 4, 1899; Previous service, 1893–1895.	5th term*	Left the House in 1907.
137	John Humphrey Small	D	NC-01	March 4, 1899	4th term	
138	Charles R. Thomas	D	NC-03	March 4, 1899	4th term	
139	Frank Charles Wachter	R	MD-03	March 4, 1899	4th term	Left the House in 1907.
140	James Eli Watson	R	IN-06	March 4, 1899; Previous service, 1895–1897.	5th term*	
141	Charles E. Littlefield	R	ME-02	June 19, 1899	4th term	
142	Joseph E. Ransdell	D	LA-05	August 29, 1899	4th term	
143	Dorsey W. Shackleford	D	MO-08	August 29, 1899	4th term	
144	Amos L. Allen	R	ME-01	November 6, 1899	4th term	
145	Edward B. Vreeland	R	NY-37	November 7, 1899	4th term	
146	William N. Richardson	D	AL-08	August 6, 1900	4th term	
147	Edward de Veaux Morrell	R	PA-05	November 6, 1900	4th term	Left the House in 1907.
148	Allan Langdon McDermott	D	NJ-10	December 3, 1900	4th term	Left the House in 1907.
149	Walter I. Smith	R	IA-09	December 3, 1900	4th term	
150	James Perry Conner	R	IA-10	December 4, 1900	4th term	
151	Arthur Laban Bates	R	PA-25	March 4, 1901	3rd term	
152	Jacob A. Beidler	R	OH-20	March 4, 1901	3rd term	Left the House in 1907.
153	Sydney J. Bowie	D	AL-04	March 4, 1901	3rd term	Left the House in 1907.
154	Webster E. Brown	R	WI-10	March 4, 1901	3rd term	Left the House in 1907.
155	George Farmer Burgess	D	TX-09	March 4, 1901	3rd term	
156	Ezekiel S. Candler, Jr.	D	MS-01	March 4, 1901	3rd term	
157	Frank Dunklee Currier	R	NH-02	March 4, 1901	3rd term	
158	Archibald B. Darragh	R	MI-11	March 4, 1901	3rd term	
159	Elias Deemer	R	PA-15	March 4, 1901	3rd term	Left the House in 1907.
160	William Henry Draper	R	NY-22	March 4, 1901	3rd term	
161	Henry D. Flood	D	VA-10	March 4, 1901	3rd term	
162	David J. Foster	R	VT-01	March 4, 1901	3rd term	
163	Joseph H. Gaines	R	WV-03	March 4, 1901	3rd term	
164	Henry M. Goldfogle	D	NY-09	March 4, 1901	3rd term	
165	Kittredge Haskins	R	VT-02	March 4, 1901	3rd term	
166	Elias S. Holliday	R	IN-05	March 4, 1901	3rd term	
167	James A. Hughes	R	WV-05	March 4, 1901	3rd term	
168	Joseph T. Johnson	D	SC-04	March 4, 1901	3rd term	
169	Claude Kitchin	D	NC-02	March 4, 1901	3rd term	
170	Eben Martin	R	SD	March 4, 1901	3rd term	Left the House in 1907.
171	George H. Lindsay	D	NY-02	March 4, 1901	3rd term	
172	Thomas Frank Marshall	R	ND	March 4, 1901	3rd term	
173	Harry L. Maynard	D	VA-02	March 4, 1901	3rd term	
174	James McLachlan	R	CA-07	March 4, 1901; Previous service, 1895–1897.	4th term*	
175	Robert M. Nevin	R	OH-03	March 4, 1901	3rd term	Left the House in 1907.
176	Lemuel P. Padgett	D	TN-07	March 4, 1901	3rd term	
177	Henry Wilbur Palmer	R	PA-11	March 4, 1901	3rd term	Left the House in 1907.
178	George Robert Patterson	R	PA-12	March 4, 1901	3rd term	Died on March 21, 1906.
179	Malcolm R. Patterson	D	TN-10	March 4, 1901	3rd term	Resigned on November 5, 1906.
180	James Breck Perkins	R	NY-32	March 4, 1901	3rd term	
181	Edward W. Pou	D	NC-04	March 4, 1901	3rd term	
182	Choice B. Randell	D	TX-04	March 4, 1901	3rd term	
183	Charles C. Reid	D	AR-05	March 4, 1901	3rd term	
184	Charles Frederick Scott	R	KS	March 4, 1901	3rd term	
185	George N. Southwick	R	NY-23	March 4, 1901; Previous service, 1895–1899.	5th term*	
186	Charles Q. Tirrell	R	MA-04	March 4, 1901	3rd term	
187	South Trimble	D	KY-07	March 4, 1901	3rd term	Left the House in 1907.
188	Ariosto A. Wiley	D	AL-02	March 4, 1901	3rd term	
189	Llewellyn Powers	R	ME-04	April 8, 1901; Previous service, 1877–1879.	4th term*	
190	Henry B. Cassel	R	PA-09	November 5, 1901	3rd term	
191	Charles L. Knapp	R	NY-28	November 5, 1901	3rd term	
192	Asbury Francis Lever	D	SC-07	November 5, 1901	3rd term	
193	Frank B. Brandegee	R	CT-03	November 4, 1902	3rd term	Resigned on May 10, 1905.
194	John Wilbur Dwight	R	NY-30	November 4, 1902	3rd term	
195	Augustus Peabody Gardner	R	MA-06	November 4, 1902	3rd term	
196	Carter Glass	D	VA-06	November 4, 1902	3rd term	
197	Gordon J. Russell	D	TX-03	November 4, 1902	3rd term	
198	Morris Sheppard	D	TX-01	November 15, 1902	3rd term	
199	Henry Cullen Adams	R	WI-02	March 4, 1903	2nd term	Died on July 9, 1906.
200	Wyatt Aiken	D	SC-03	March 4, 1903	2nd term	
201	Butler Ames	R	MA-05	March 4, 1903	2nd term	
202	James Andrew Beall	D	TX-05	March 4, 1903	2nd term	
203	James Bede	R	MN-08	March 4, 1903	2nd term	
204	Benjamin P. Birdsall	R	IA-03	March 4, 1903	2nd term	
205	Eaton J. Bowers	D	MS-06	March 4, 1903	2nd term	
206	Thomas W. Bradley	R	NY-20	March 4, 1903	2nd term	
207	Franklin E. Brooks	R	CO-03	March 4, 1903	2nd term	Left the House in 1907.
208	Clarence Buckman	R	MN-06	March 4, 1903	2nd term	Left the House in 1907.
209	Adam M. Byrd	D	MS-05	March 4, 1903	2nd term	
210	Philip P. Campbell	R	KS-03	March 4, 1903	2nd term	
211	Allen Foster Cooper	R	PA-23	March 4, 1903	2nd term	
212	Charles Russell Davis	R	MN-03	March 4, 1903	2nd term	
213	Joseph M. Dixon	R	MT	March 4, 1903	2nd term	Left the House in 1907.
214	Solomon Robert Dresser	R	PA-21	March 4, 1903	2nd term	Left the House in 1907.
215	Charles T. Dunwell	R	NY-03	March 4, 1903	2nd term	
216	Scott Field	D	TX-06	March 4, 1903	2nd term	Left the House in 1907.
217	William H. Flack	R	NY-26	March 4, 1903	2nd term	Died on February 2, 1907.
218	Burton L. French	R	ID	March 4, 1903	2nd term	
219	Charles Eugene Fuller	R	IL-12	March 4, 1903	2nd term	
220	Harvey C. Garber	D	OH-04	March 4, 1903	2nd term	
221	John Nance Garner	D	TX-15	March 4, 1903	2nd term	
222	Oscar W. Gillespie	D	TX-12	March 4, 1903	2nd term	
223	James Gillett	R	CA-01	March 4, 1903	2nd term	Resigned on November 4, 1906.
224	Herman P. Goebel	R	OH-02	March 4, 1903	2nd term	
225	Joseph A. Goulden	D	NY-18	March 4, 1903	2nd term	
226	Daniel L. D. Granger	D	RI-01	March 4, 1903	2nd term	
227	Alexander W. Gregg	D	TX-07	March 4, 1903	2nd term	
228	James M. Gudger, Jr.	D	NC-10	March 4, 1903	2nd term	Left the House in 1907.
229	Thomas W. Hardwick	D	GA-10	March 4, 1903	2nd term	
230	William Randolph Hearst	D	NY-11	March 4, 1903	2nd term	Left the House in 1907.
231	Wilson S. Hill	D	MS-04	March 4, 1903	2nd term	
232	Edmund H. Hinshaw	R	NE-04	March 4, 1903	2nd term	
233	Herschel M. Hogg	R	CO-02	March 4, 1903	2nd term	Left the House in 1907.
234	Francis A. Hopkins	D	KY-10	March 4, 1903	2nd term	Left the House in 1907.
235	Joseph Howell	R	UT	March 4, 1903	2nd term	
236	George Franklin Huff	R	PA-22	March 4, 1903; Previous service, 1891–1893 and 1895–1897.	4th term**	
237	Benjamin G. Humphreys II	D	MS-03	March 4, 1903	2nd term	
238	William E. Humphrey	R	WA	March 4, 1903	2nd term	
239	John T. Hunt	D	MO-11	March 4, 1903	2nd term	Left the House in 1907.
240	Ollie Murray James	D	KY-01	March 4, 1903	2nd term	
241	John A. Keliher	D	MA-09	March 4, 1903	2nd term	
242	James Kennedy	R	OH-18	March 4, 1903	2nd term	
243	Moses Kinkaid	R	NE-06	March 4, 1903	2nd term	
244	Marcus C. L. Kline	D	PA-13	March 4, 1903	2nd term	Left the House in 1907.
245	Philip Knopf	R	IL-07	March 4, 1903	2nd term	
246	William Bailey Lamar	D	FL-03	March 4, 1903	2nd term	
247	Frederick Landis	R	IN-11	March 4, 1903	2nd term	Left the House in 1907.
248	Daniel F. Lafean	R	PA-20	March 4, 1903	2nd term	
249	George Swinton Legaré	D	SC-01	March 4, 1903	2nd term	
250	George L. Lilley	R	CT	March 4, 1903	2nd term	
251	Nicholas Longworth	R	OH-01	March 4, 1903	2nd term	
252	William Lorimer	R	IL-06	March 4, 1903; Previous service, 1895–1901.	5th term*	
253	George A. Loud	R	MI-10	March 4, 1903	2nd term	
254	Robert B. Macon	D	AR-01	March 4, 1903	2nd term	
255	Benjamin F. Marsh	R	IL-14	March 4, 1903; Previous service, 1877–1883 and 1893–1901.	9th term**	Died on June 2, 1905.
256	John McCarthy	R	NE-03	March 4, 1903	2nd term	Left the House in 1907.
257	George Deardorff McCreary	R	PA-06	March 4, 1903	2nd term	
258	Henry McMorran	R	MI-07	March 4, 1903	2nd term	
259	William S. McNary	D	MA-10	March 4, 1903	2nd term	Left the House in 1907.
260	George W. Norris	R	NE-05	March 4, 1903	2nd term	
261	Robert N. Page	D	NC-07	March 4, 1903	2nd term	
262	Gilbert B. Patterson	D	NC-06	March 4, 1903	2nd term	Left the House in 1907.
263	Arsène Pujo	D	LA-07	March 4, 1903	2nd term	
264	Henry Thomas Rainey	D	IL-20	March 4, 1903	2nd term	
265	Joseph Taylor Robinson	D	AR-06	March 4, 1903	2nd term	
266	William A. Rodenberg	R	IL-22	March 4, 1903; Previous service, 1899–1901.	3rd term*	
267	J. Swagar Sherley	D	KY-05	March 4, 1903	2nd term	
268	Campbell Slemp	R	VA-09	March 4, 1903	2nd term	
269	William Orlando Smith	R	PA-27	March 4, 1903	2nd term	
270	William Robert Smith	D	TX-16	March 4, 1903	2nd term	Left the House in 1907.
271	Howard M. Snapp	R	IL-11	March 4, 1903	2nd term	
272	Robert G. Southall	D	VA-04	March 4, 1903	2nd term	Left the House in 1907.
273	William H. Stafford	R	WI-05	March 4, 1903	2nd term	
274	Augustus Owsley Stanley	D	KY-02	March 4, 1903	2nd term	
275	Halvor Steenerson	R	MN-09	March 4, 1903	2nd term	
276	John Allen Sterling	R	IL-17	March 4, 1903	2nd term	
277	John Andrew Sullivan	D	MA-11	March 4, 1903	2nd term	Left the House in 1907.
278	Timothy Sullivan	D	NY-08	March 4, 1903	2nd term	Resigned on July 27, 1906.
279	Joshua Frederick Cockey Talbott	D	MD-02	March 4, 1903; Previous service, 1879–1885 and 1893–1895.	6th term**	
280	Charles E. Townsend	R	MI-02	March 4, 1903	2nd term	
281	Clarence D. Van Duzer	D	NV	March 4, 1903	2nd term	Left the House in 1907.
282	Andrew Volstead	R	MN-07	March 4, 1903	2nd term	
283	Robert M. Wallace	D	AR-07	March 4, 1903	2nd term	
284	Edwin Y. Webb	D	NC-09	March 4, 1903	2nd term	
285	John N. Williamson	R	OR-01	March 4, 1903	2nd term	Left the House in 1907.
286	William Warfield Wilson	R	IL-03	March 4, 1903	2nd term	
287	Harry C. Woodyard	R	WV-04	March 4, 1903	2nd term	
288	H. Olin Young	R	MI-12	March 4, 1903	2nd term	
289	Charles H. Weisse	D	WI-06	March 4, 1903	2nd term	
290	William H. Wiley	R	NJ-08	March 4, 1903	2nd term	Left the House in 1907.
291	Victor Murdock	R	KS-07	May 26, 1903	2nd term	
292	Binger Hermann	R	OR-02	June 1, 1903; Previous service, 1885–1897.	8th term*	Left the House in 1907.
293	Reuben Moon	R	PA-04	November 3, 1903	2nd term	
294	Capell L. Weems	R	OH-16	November 3, 1903	2nd term	
295	John M. Pinckney	D	TX-08	November 17, 1903	2nd term	Died on April 24, 1905.
296	Robert W. Bonynge	R	CO-01	February 16, 1904	2nd term	
297	George A. Castor	R	PA-03	February 16, 1904	2nd term	Died on February 19, 1906.
298	William Bourke Cockran	D	NY-12	February 23, 1904; Previous service, 1887–1889 and 1891–1895.	4th term**	
299	James Thomas Heflin	D	AL-05	May 19, 1904	2nd term	
300	Joseph R. Knowland	R	CA-03	November 8, 1904	2nd term	
301	W. Aubrey Thomas	R	OH-19	November 8, 1904	2nd term	
302	Amos R. Webber	R	OH-14	November 8, 1904	2nd term	Left the House in 1907.
303	Ira W. Wood	R	NJ-04	November 8, 1904	2nd term	
304	Henry C. Allen	R	NJ-06	March 4, 1905	1st term	Left the House in 1907.
305	John Emory Andrus	R	NY-19	March 4, 1905	1st term	
306	Henry T. Bannon	R	OH-10	March 4, 1905	1st term	
307	Andrew Jackson Barchfeld	R	PA-32	March 4, 1905	1st term	
308	Thomas Montgomery Bell	D	GA-09	March 4, 1905	1st term	
309	Joseph B. Bennett	R	KY-09	March 4, 1905	1st term	
310	William Stiles Bennet	R	NY-17	March 4, 1905	1st term	
311	Edmond Spencer Blackburn	R	NC-08	March 4, 1905; Previous service, 1901–1903.	2nd term*	Left the House in 1907.
312	Moses L. Broocks	D	TX-02	March 4, 1905	1st term	Left the House in 1907.
313	James F. Burke	R	PA-31	March 4, 1905	1st term	
314	Hiram R. Burton	R	DE	March 4, 1905	1st term	
315	Mounce Gore Butler	D	TN-04	March 4, 1905	1st term	Left the House in 1907.
316	William M. Calder	R	NY-06	March 4, 1905	1st term	
317	William Wildman Campbell	R	OH-05	March 4, 1905	1st term	Left the House in 1907.
318	John C. Chaney	R	IN-02	March 4, 1905	1st term	
319	Pleasant T. Chapman	R	IL-24	March 4, 1905	1st term	
320	Frank Clark	D	FL-02	March 4, 1905	1st term	
321	William W. Cocks	R	NY-01	March 4, 1905	1st term	
322	Ralph D. Cole	R	OH-08	March 4, 1905	1st term	
323	Thomas Henry Dale	R	PA-10	March 4, 1905	1st term	Left the House in 1907.
324	Beman Gates Dawes	R	OH-15	March 4, 1905	1st term	
325	Albert F. Dawson	R	IA-02	March 4, 1905	1st term	
326	Edwin Denby	R	MI-01	March 4, 1905	1st term	
327	Frank S. Dickson	R	IL-23	March 4, 1905	1st term	Left the House in 1907.
328	Lincoln Dixon	D	IN-04	March 4, 1905	1st term	
329	Don C. Edwards	R	KY-11	March 4, 1905	1st term	
330	J. Edwin Ellerbe	D	SC-06	March 4, 1905	1st term	
331	Edgar C. Ellis	R	MO-05	March 4, 1905	1st term	
332	Jacob Sloat Fassett	R	NY-33	March 4, 1905	1st term	
333	Loren Fletcher	R	MN-05	March 4, 1905; Previous service, 1893–1903.	6th term*	Left the House in 1907.
334	John C. Floyd	D	AR-03	March 4, 1905	1st term	
335	Frank B. Fulkerson	R	MO-04	March 4, 1905	1st term	Left the House in 1907.
336	Finis J. Garrett	D	TN-09	March 4, 1905	1st term	
337	Newton W. Gilbert	R	IN-12	March 4, 1905	1st term	Resigned on November 6, 1906.
338	John Gill, Jr.	D	MD-04	March 4, 1905	1st term	
339	William Harrison Graham	R	PA-29	March 4, 1905; Previous service, 1898–1903.	4th term*	
340	Asle Gronna	R	ND	March 4, 1905	1st term	
341	Nathan W. Hale	R	TN-02	March 4, 1905	1st term	
342	Everis A. Hayes	R	CA-05	March 4, 1905	1st term	
343	Rockwood Hoar	R	MA-03	March 4, 1905	1st term	Died on November 1, 1906.
344	William C. Houston	D	TN-05	March 4, 1905	1st term	
345	Elbert H. Hubbard	R	IA-11	March 4, 1905	1st term	
346	Julius Kahn	R	CA-04	March 4, 1905; Previous service, 1899–1903.	3rd term*	
347	J. Warren Keifer	R	OH-07	March 4, 1905; Previous service, 1877–1885.	5th term*	
348	John L. Kennedy	R	NE-02	March 4, 1905	1st term	Left the House in 1907.
349	Frank B. Klepper	R	MO-03	March 4, 1905	1st term	Left the House in 1907.
350	Charles B. Law	R	NY-04	March 4, 1905	1st term	
351	Gordon Lee	D	GA-07	March 4, 1905	1st term	
352	Frank J. LeFevre	R	NY-24	March 4, 1905	1st term	Left the House in 1907.
353	Mial Eben Lilley	R	PA-14	March 4, 1905	1st term	Left the House in 1907.
354	Martin B. Madden	R	IL-01	March 4, 1905	1st term	
355	Charles McGavin	R	IL-08	March 4, 1905	1st term	
356	Duncan E. McKinlay	R	CA-02	March 4, 1905	1st term	
356	William B. McKinley	R	IL-19	March 4, 1905	1st term	
357	Anthony Michalek	R	IL-05	March 4, 1905	1st term	Left the House in 1907.
358	Grant E. Mouser	R	OH-13	March 4, 1905	1st term	
359	Arthur P. Murphy	R	MO-16	March 4, 1905	1st term	Left the House in 1907.
360	J. Van Vechten Olcott	R	NY-15	March 4, 1905	1st term	
361	Herbert Parsons	R	NY-13	March 4, 1905	1st term	
362	James O'H. Patterson	D	SC-02	March 4, 1905	1st term	
363	John Merriman Reynolds	R	PA-19	March 4, 1905	1st term	
364	James M. Richardson	D	KY-03	March 4, 1905	1st term	Left the House in 1907.
365	Joseph L. Rhinock	D	KY-06	March 4, 1905	1st term	
366	Marion E. Rhodes	R	MO-13	March 4, 1905	1st term	Left the House in 1907.
367	Zeno J. Rives	R	IL-21	March 4, 1905	1st term	Left the House in 1907.
368	Edmund W. Samuel	R	PA-16	March 4, 1905	1st term	Left the House in 1907.
369	Gustav A. Schneebeli	R	PA-26	March 4, 1905	1st term	Left the House in 1907.
370	Thomas E. Scroggy	R	OH-06	March 4, 1905	1st term	Left the House in 1907.
371	Cassius M. Shartel	R	MO-15	March 4, 1905	1st term	Left the House in 1907.
372	Sylvester C. Smith	R	CA-08	March 4, 1905	1st term	
373	Thomas Alexander Smith	D	MD-01	March 4, 1905	1st term	Left the House in 1907.
374	Martin L. Smyser	R	OH-17	March 4, 1905; Previous service, 1889–1891.	2nd term*	Left the House in 1907.
375	Edward L. Taylor, Jr.	R	OH-12	March 4, 1905	1st term	
376	Charles A. Towne	D	NY-14	March 4, 1905; Previous service, 1895–1897.	2nd term*	Left the House in 1907.
377	William T. Tyndall	R	MO-14	March 4, 1905	1st term	Left the House in 1907.
378	George E. Waldo	R	NY-05	March 4, 1905	1st term	
379	John T. Watkins	D	LA-04	March 4, 1905	1st term	
380	John W. Weeks	R	MA-12	March 4, 1905	1st term	
381	John Welborn	R	MO-07	March 4, 1905	1st term	Left the House in 1907.
382	Charles S. Wharton	R	IL-04	March 4, 1905	1st term	Left the House in 1907.
383	Marshall Van Winkle	R	NJ-09	March 4, 1905	1st term	Left the House in 1907.
384	Ernest E. Wood	D	MO-12	March 4, 1905	1st term	Resigned on June 23, 1906.
	John H. Foster	R	IN-01	May 16, 1905	1st term	
	Thomas Beall Davis	D	WV-02	June 6, 1905	1st term	Left the House in 1907.
	Ernest M. Pollard	R	NE-01	July 18, 1905	1st term	
	Edwin W. Higgins	R	CT-03	October 2, 1905	1st term	
	James McKinney	R	IL-14	November 7, 1905	1st term	
	John M. Moore	D	TX-08	December 4, 1905	1st term	
	Harry M. Coudrey	R	MO-12	June 23, 1906	1st term	
	John M. Nelson	R	WI-02	September 4, 1906	1st term	
	James W. Overstreet	D	GA-01	October 3, 1906	1st term	Left the House in 1907.
	Charles N. Brumm	R	PA-12	November 6, 1906; Previous service, 1881–1889 and 1895–1899.	7th term**	
	William F. Englebright	R	CA-01	November 6, 1906	1st term	
	Clarence C. Gilhams	R	IN-12	November 6, 1906	1st term	
	Frank Orren Lowden	R	IL-13	November 6, 1906	1st term	
	J. Hampton Moore	R	PA-03	November 6, 1906	1st term	
	John E. Reyburn	R	PA-02	November 6, 1906; Previous service, 1890–1897.	5th term*	
	Daniel J. Riordan	D	NY-08	November 6, 1906; Previous service, 1899–1901.	2nd term*	
	Edward W. Saunders	D	VA-05	November 6, 1906	1st term	
	Charles G. Washburn	R	MA-03	December 18, 1906	1st term	

== Delegates ==
Rank	Delegate	Party	District	Seniority date (Previous service, if any)	No.# of term(s)	Notes
1	Jonah Kūhiō Kalanianaʻole	R	HI	March 4, 1903	2nd term	
2	Bird Segle McGuire	R	OK	March 4, 1903	2nd term	
3	William Henry Andrews	R	NM	March 4, 1905	1st term	
4	Tulio Larrínaga		PR	March 4, 1905	1st term	
5	Marcus A. Smith	D	AZ	March 4, 1905; Previous service, 1887–1895, 1897–1899 and 1901–1903.	7th term***	
6	Frank Hinman Waskey	D	AK	August 14, 1906	1st term	

== See also ==
- 59th United States Congress
- List of United States congressional districts
- List of United States senators in the 59th Congress
