= Charles A. Karch =

American politician

Charles Adam Karch
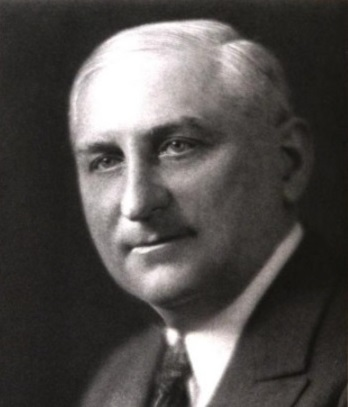

Member of the U.S. House of Representatives from Illinois's 22nd district
- In office March 4, 1931 – November 6, 1932
- Preceded by: Edward M. Irwin
- Succeeded by: Edwin M. Schaefer

Member of the Illinois House of Representatives
- In office 1904-1906; 1910-1914

Personal details
- Born: March 17, 1875 Englemann Township, Illinois, U.S.
- Died: November 6, 1932 (aged 57) St. Louis, Missouri, U.S.
- Resting place: Mount Hope Cemetery, Belleville, Illinois, U.S.
- Party: Democratic
- Education: Northern Illinois Normal University

Charles Adam Karch (March 17, 1875 – November 6, 1932) was a U.S. representative from Illinois.

Born on a farm in Englemann Township, St. Clair County, Illinois, the son of German immigrants. Karch attended the public schools. He graduated from Northern Illinois Normal University (now the Illinois State University), at Normal, Illinois, in 1894. He taught school from 1895 to 1900.

Karch graduated from the law department of Wesleyan College (now Illinois Wesleyan University), Bloomington, Illinois, in 1898. He was admitted to the bar in 1898 and commenced practice in Belleville, Illinois. He served as secretary to Congressman Fred J. Kern from 1901 to 1903. He served in the Illinois House of Representatives from 1904 to 1906 and again from 1910 to 1914. He moved to East St. Louis in 1914 where he continued the practice of law. He served as United States Attorney for the Eastern District of Illinois from 1914 to 1918.

Karch was elected as a Democrat to the Seventy-second Congress and served from March 4, 1931, until his death. He had been nominated for reelection to the Seventy-third Congress. He died in St. Louis, Missouri, on November 6, 1932, and was interred in Mount Hope Cemetery, Belleville, Illinois.

== See also ==
- List of members of the United States Congress who died in office (1900–1949)

U.S. House of Representatives
Preceded by Edward M. Irwin	Member of the U.S. House of Representatives from Illinois's 22nd congressional district March 4, 1931 - November 6, 1932	Succeeded by Edwin M. Schaefer
