= 1988 Illinois's 21st congressional district special election =

- August 9, 1988
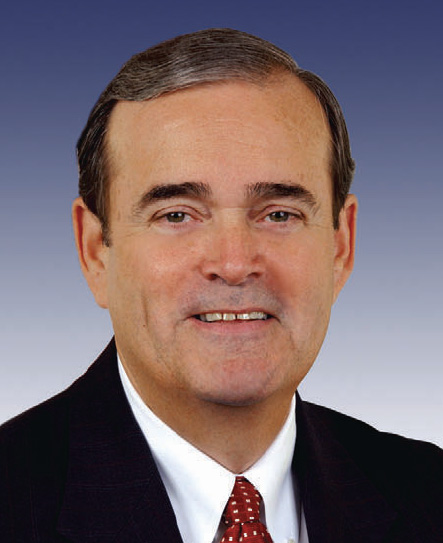

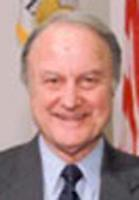
Nominee	Jerry Costello	Robert Gaffner
Party	Democratic	Republican
Popular vote	33,144	31,257
Percentage	51.46%	48.53%
- County results Costello: 50–60% Gaffner: 50–60% 60–70%
Representative before election
Melvin Price
Democratic
Elected Representative
Jerry Costello
Democratic

A special election to the United States House of Representatives for Illinois's 21st congressional district was held August 9, 1988.

The winning candidate would serve briefly in the United States House of Representatives to represent Illinois in the 100th Congress until the general election on November 8, 1988.

== Background ==
On April 22, 1988, Incumbent U.S. Representative Melvin Price died of cancer after 22 terms. A special election was held to fill the vacancy caused by his death.

== Democratic primary ==
=== Candidates ===
==== Nominee ====
- Jerry Costello, St. Clair County Board chairman

==== Eliminated in primary ====
- Pete Fields, former Madison County Auditor and candidate for this seat in 1986
- Mike Mansfield, political activist
- Steve Maragides, political activist

=== Results ===
Democratic primary results
Party	Candidate	Votes	%
Democratic	Jeremy Costello	35,279	46.23%
Democratic	Pete Fields	20,500	26.87%
Democratic	Mike Mansfield	19,223	25.19%
Democratic	Steve Maragides	1,305	1.71%
Total votes		76,307	100.00%

== Republican primary ==
=== Candidates ===
==== Nominee ====
- Robert Gaffner, nominee for this seat in 1982, 1984, and 1986 and candidate for Illinois's 24th congressional district in 1972

=== Results ===
Republican primary results
Party	Candidate	Votes	%
Republican	Robert Gaffner	16,334	100.00%
Total votes		16,334	100.00%

== General election ==
1988 Illinois's 21st congressional district special election
Party	Candidate	Votes	%	±%
Democratic	Jerry Costello	33,144	51.46%	+1.10%
Republican	Robert Gaffner	31,257	48.53%	+1.11%
Independent	Write-In	1	0.00%	0.00%
Majority		1,887	2.93%	+2.21%
Turnout		64,402	100.00%	
Democratic hold				

== See also ==
- 1988 United States House of Representatives elections
