= Loren E. Wheeler =

American politician (1862–1932)

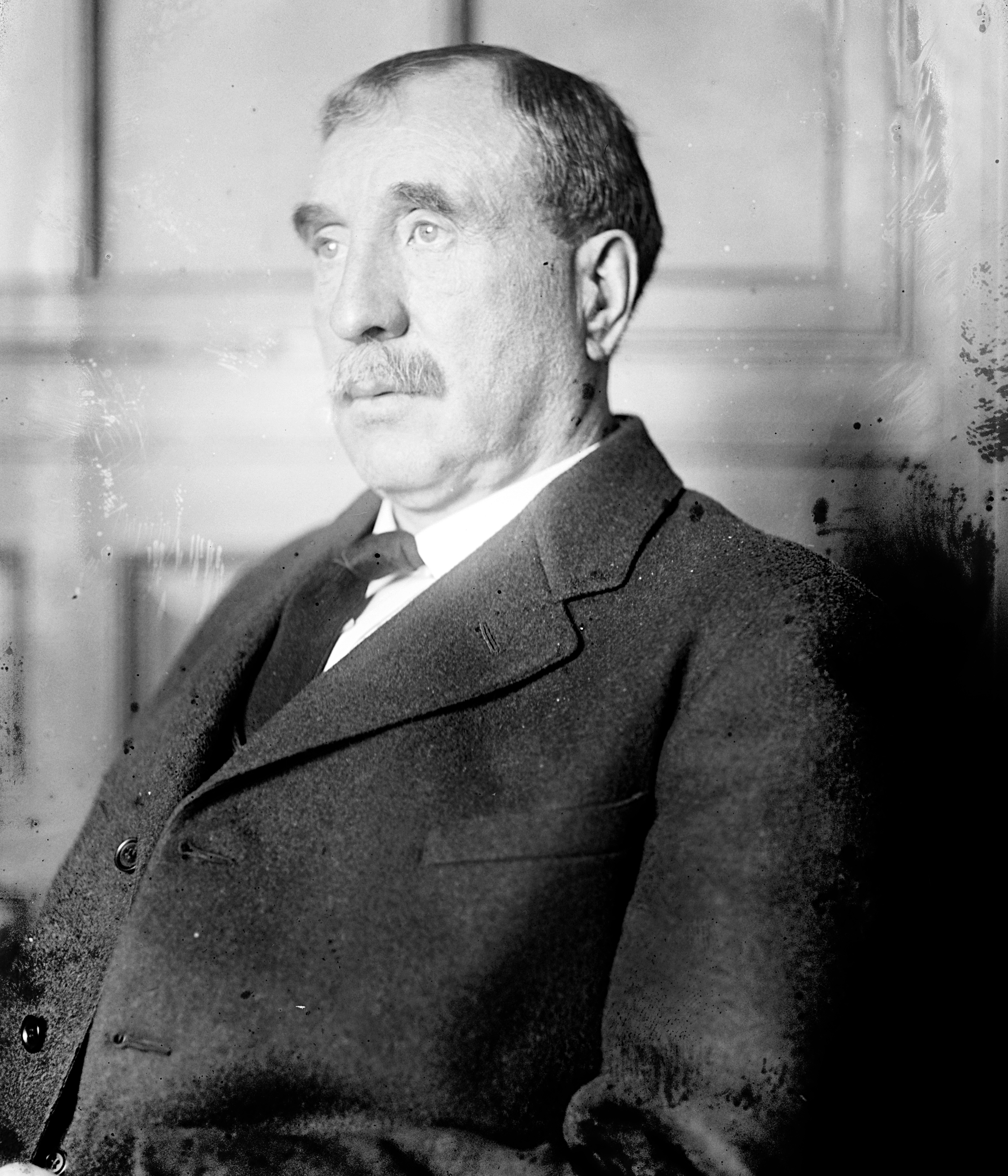

Member of the U.S. House of Representatives from Illinois's 21st district
- In office March 4, 1925 – March 3, 1927
- Preceded by: James Earl Major
- Succeeded by: James Earl Major
- In office March 4, 1915 – March 3, 1923
- Preceded by: James McMahon Graham
- Succeeded by: James Earl Major

Mayor of Springfield
- In office 1897–1900
- Preceded by: Marion U. Woodruff
- Succeeded by: John L. Phillips

Personal details
- Born: October 7, 1862 Havana, Illinois, U.S.
- Died: January 8, 1932 (aged 69) Springfield, Illinois, U.S.
- Resting place: Oak Ridge Cemetery
- Party: Republican

Loren Edgar Wheeler (October 7, 1862 – January 8, 1932) was a U.S. representative from Illinois.

Born in Havana, Illinois, Wheeler attended the public schools and Graylock Institute, South Williamstown, Massachusetts. He moved to Springfield, Illinois, in 1880 and engaged in the ice and coal business until 1910 when he became identified with the advertising business. He served as member of the board of aldermen from 1895 to 1897. He served as Mayor of Springfield from 1897 to 1901. He served as delegate to the Republican National Convention in 1900. He was Postmaster of Springfield from 1901 to 1913.

Wheeler was elected as a Republican to the Sixty-fourth and to the three succeeding Congresses (March 4, 1915 – March 3, 1923). On April 5, 1917, he voted against declaring war on Germany. He served as chairman of the Committee on Railways and Canals (Sixty-sixth and Sixty-seventh Congresses). He was an unsuccessful candidate for reelection in 1922 to the Sixty-eighth Congress.

Wheeler was again elected to the Sixty-ninth Congress (March 4, 1925 – March 3, 1927). He was an unsuccessful candidate for reelection in 1926 to the Seventieth Congress. He continued his former business activities in Springfield, Illinois, until his death there on January 8, 1932. He was interred in Oak Ridge Cemetery.

U.S. House of Representatives
Preceded by James M. Graham	Member of the U.S. House of Representatives from Illinois's 21st congressional district 1915–1923	Succeeded by J. Earl Major
Preceded by J. Earl Major	Member of the U.S. House of Representatives from Illinois's 21st congressional district 1925–1927	Succeeded by J. Earl Major
