= J. Otis Humphrey =

American judge (1850–1918)

Judge of the United States District Court for the Southern District of Illinois
- In office March 8, 1901 – June 14, 1918
- Appointed by: William McKinley
- Preceded by: William J. Allen
- Succeeded by: Louis FitzHenry

Personal details
- Born: J. Otis Humphrey; December 30, 1850 Morgan County, Illinois
- Died: June 14, 1918 (aged 67)
- Education: Shurtleff College read law

J. Otis Humphrey (December 30, 1850 – June 14, 1918) was an American lawyer and jurist who served as a United States district judge of the United States District Court for the Southern District of Illinois from 1901 to 1918.

== Education and career ==
Born in Morgan County, Illinois, Humphrey attended Shurtleff College, and read law to enter the bar in 1880. He was a legal clerk for the Illinois State Office of Railroad and Warehouse Commissioners from 1880 to 1883. He was in private practice in Springfield, Illinois from 1883 to 1897. He was then the United States Attorney for the Southern District of Illinois from 1897 to 1901.

== Federal judicial service ==
On March 7, 1901, Humphrey was nominated by President William McKinley to a seat on the United States District Court for the Southern District of Illinois vacated by Judge William J. Allen. Humphrey was confirmed by the United States Senate on March 8, 1901, and received his commission the same day. Humphrey served in that capacity until his death.

== Death . ==
He died on June 14, 1918, at the age of 67.

== Sources ==
Legal offices
Preceded by William J. Allen	Judge of the United States District Court for the Southern District of Illinois; 1901–1918	Succeeded by Louis FitzHenry
