= Ben F. Caldwell =

American politician (1848–1924)

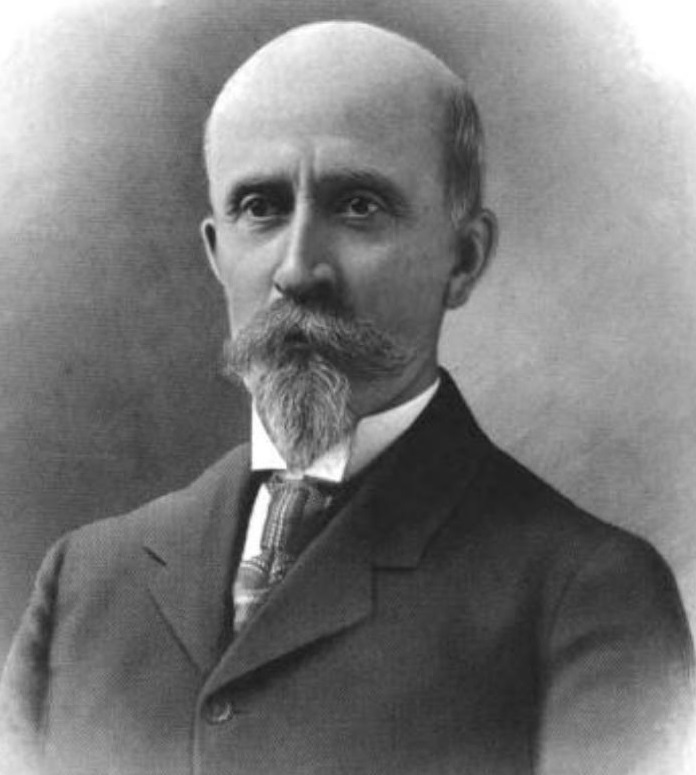
- From Volume I of 1904's Past and Present of the City of Springfield and Sangamon Count, Illinois

Member of the U.S. House of Representatives from Illinois's 21st district
- In office March 4, 1907 – March 3, 1909
- Preceded by: Zeno J. Rives
- Succeeded by: James McMahon Graham
- In office March 4, 1903 – March 3, 1905
- Preceded by: Fred J. Kern
- Succeeded by: Zeno J. Rives

Member of the U.S. House of Representatives from Illinois's 17th district
- In office March 4, 1899 – March 3, 1903
- Preceded by: James A. Connolly
- Succeeded by: John A. Sterling

Member of the Illinois House of Representatives
- In office 1882-1886

Member of the Illinois Senate
- In office 1890-1894

Personal details
- Born: Ben Franklin Caldwell; August 2, 1848 Carrollton, Illinois
- Died: December 29, 1924 (aged 76) Springfield, Illinois
- Resting place: Oak Ridge Cemetery
- Party: Democratic

Ben Franklin Caldwell (August 2, 1848 – December 29, 1924) was an American politician who served two non-consecutive terms as a U.S. representative from Illinois in from 1899 to 1905 and from 1907 to 1909.

== Biography ==
Born near Carrollton, Illinois, Caldwell moved to Illinois in April 1853 with his parents, who settled near Chatham, Illinois. He attended the public schools, and thereafter engaged in agricultural pursuits. He served as member of the Board of Supervisors of Sangamon County in 1877 and 1878.

He served as member of the Illinois House of Representatives 1882–1886, and served in the Illinois Senate 1890–1894.

=== Congress ===
Upon his election to Congress in 1898, he resigned the presidency of the Farmers' National Bank of Springfield, which office he had held since 1885. He also served as president of the Caldwell State Bank of Chatham.

Caldwell was elected as a Democrat to the Fifty-sixth, Fifty-seventh, and Fifty-eighth Congresses (March 4, 1899 – March 3, 1905). He was an unsuccessful candidate for reelection in 1904 to the Fifty-ninth Congress.

Caldwell was elected to the Sixtieth Congress (March 4, 1907 – March 3, 1909).

=== Later career and death ===
He was not a candidate for renomination in 1908. He again engaged in banking in Chatham, Illinois. He died in Springfield, Illinois, on December 29, 1924. He was interred in Oak Ridge Cemetery.

U.S. House of Representatives
Preceded by James A. Connolly	Member of the U.S. House of Representatives from Illinois's 17th congressional district 1899–1903	Succeeded by John A. Sterling
Preceded by Fred J. Kern	Member of the U.S. House of Representatives from Illinois's 21st congressional district 1903–1905	Succeeded by Zeno J. Rives
Preceded by Zeno J. Rives	Member of the U.S. House of Representatives from Illinois's 21st congressional district 1907–1909	Succeeded by James M. Graham
