= Calvin D. Johnson =

American politician

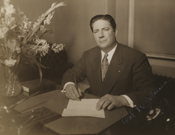
- Johnson in 1943

Member of the U.S. House of Representatives from Illinois's 22nd district
- In office January 3, 1943 – January 3, 1945
- Preceded by: Edwin M. Schaefer
- Succeeded by: Charles Melvin Price

Personal details
- Born: November 22, 1898 Fordsville, Kentucky, U.S.
- Died: October 13, 1985 (aged 86) Belleville, Illinois, U.S.
- Party: Republican

Calvin Dean Johnson (November 22, 1898 – October 13, 1985) was a U.S. Representative from Illinois.

Born in Fordsville, Kentucky, Johnson moved with his parents to St. Clair County, Illinois, in 1904, and attended public schools. He engaged in the general contracting business from 1922 to 1944. He served as member of the St. Clair County School Board from 1926 to 1928. He served as member of the St. Clair County, Illinois, Board of Supervisors from 1930 to 1934. He served in the Illinois House of Representatives from 1935 to 1941.

Johnson was elected as a Republican to the Seventy-eighth Congress (January 3, 1943 – January 3, 1945). He was an unsuccessful candidate for reelection in 1944 to the Seventy-ninth Congress and for election in 1946 to the Eightieth Congress.

After his Congressional career, he served as executive assistant to vice president of Remington-Rand, Inc., in Washington, D.C. from 1952 to 1968. He engaged in public relations and speaking. He was a resident of Upper Marlboro, Maryland outside of Washington DC, until he moved back to Belleville, Illinois before his death there on October 13, 1985.

U.S. House of Representatives
Preceded by Edwin M. Schaefer	Member of the U.S. House of Representatives from Illinois's 22nd congressional district 1943-1945	Succeeded by Charles Melvin Price
