= Frank M. Ramey =

American politician

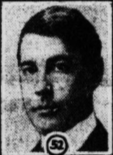

Member of the U.S. House of Representatives from Illinois's 21st district
- In office March 4, 1929 – March 3, 1931
- Preceded by: James Earl Major
- Succeeded by: James Earl Major

Personal details
- Born: September 23, 1881 Hillsboro, Illinois, U.S.
- Died: March 27, 1942 (aged 60) Hillsboro, Illinois, U.S.
- Party: Republican

Frank Marion Ramey (September 23, 1881 – March 27, 1942) was a U.S. representative from Illinois.

Born in Hillsboro, Illinois, Ramey attended the public schools and graduated from Hillsboro High School in 1900. He also attended Eastern Illinois Normal School at Charleston, Illinois. He taught school in Hillsboro, Illinois from 1902 to 1905. He studied law. He was admitted to the bar of Illinois in December 1907 and commenced practice in Hillsboro. He served as city attorney of Hillsboro 1907–1911. He was the state's attorney of Montgomery County, Illinois from 1920 to 1928.

Ramey was elected as a Republican to the Seventy-first Congress (March 4, 1929 – March 3, 1931). He was not a candidate for renomination in 1930. He served as assistant district attorney 1931–1934. He was an unsuccessful candidate for election in 1934 to the Seventy-fourth Congress, in 1936 to the Seventy-fifth Congress, and in 1938 to the Seventy-sixth Congress. He resumed the practice of law. He was appointed an examiner for the Illinois Commerce Commission in 1942 and served until his death. He died in Hillsboro, Illinois on March 27, 1942. He was interred in Oak Grove Cemetery.

U.S. House of Representatives
Preceded by James Earl Major	Member of the U.S. House of Representatives from Illinois's 21st congressional district 1929–1931	Succeeded by James Earl Major
