= Edward E. Miller =

American politician (1880–1946)

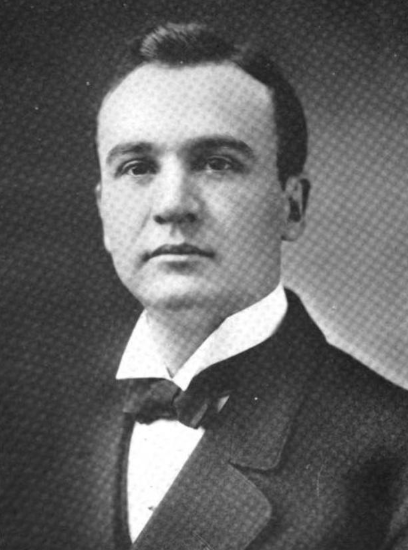
- Miller in 1921

Member of the U.S. House of Representatives from Illinois's 22nd district
- In office March 4, 1923 – March 3, 1925
- Preceded by: William A. Rodenberg
- Succeeded by: Edward M. Irwin

41st Illinois Treasurer
- In office January 10, 1921 – March 4, 1923
- Governor: Len Small
- Preceded by: Fred E. Sterling
- Succeeded by: Oscar Nelson

Personal details
- Born: Edward Edwin Miller; July 22, 1880 Creston, Iowa, US
- Died: August 1, 1946 (aged 66) St. Louis, Missouri, US
- Party: Republican
- Occupation: Politician

Edward Edwin Miller (July 22, 1880 – August 1, 1946) was an American politician. A Republican, he was a member of the United States House of Representatives from 1923 to 1925, representing Illinois's 22nd district.

== Biography ==
Miller was born on July 22, 1880, in Creston, Iowa. He was educated at common schools in Peoria. In 1892, he moved to East St. Louis, and by 1900, was working as an insurance and a real estate agent. From 1898 to 1912, he was a private secretary of politician William A. Rodenberg.

Miller was a Republican. He was a delegate to the 1912 Republican National Convention. From 1921 to 1923, he was the Illinois Treasurer. In 1921, he discovered the Treasurers who came before him to have mishandled state funds.

Miller was a member of the United States House of Representatives, from March 4, 1923, to March 3, 1925, representing Illinois's 22nd district. In December 1923, Henry T. Rainey accused Miller of paying for his Congressional campaign using funds from the State Treasury, calling for him to be expelled from Congress. He declined being nominated for re-election. Politically, he was conservative.

After serving in Congress, Miller returned to working in insurance and real estate, retiring in 1942. From 1942 until his death, he was transportation director of the American Red Cross. He was married to Mildred Miller, with whom he had three children. He died on August 1, 1946, aged 66, in St. Louis. He was buried on August 3, at St. Clair Memorial Park Cemetery, in East St. Louis.

Party political offices
Preceded by Fred E. Sterling	Republican nominee for Illinois Treasurer; 1920	Succeeded by Oscar Nelson
Political offices
Preceded by Fred E. Sterling	Treasurer of Illinois; 1921–1923	Succeeded by Oscar Nelson
U.S. House of Representatives
Preceded by William A. Rodenberg	Member of the U.S. House of Representatives from Illinois's 22nd congressional district 1923-1925	Succeeded by Edward M. Irwin
