= Edward M. Irwin =

American politician

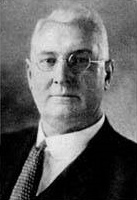

Member of the U.S. House of Representatives from Illinois's 22nd district
- In office March 4, 1925 – March 3, 1931
- Preceded by: Edward E. Miller
- Succeeded by: Charles A. Karch

Personal details
- Born: April 14, 1869 Leasburg, Missouri, U.S.
- Died: January 30, 1933 (aged 63) Belleville, Illinois, U.S.
- Party: Republican

Edward Michael Irwin (April 14, 1869 – January 30, 1933) was a U.S. representative from Illinois.

Born near Leasburg, Missouri, Irwin attended the public schools of his native city. He taught school in Leasburg, Missouri and also attended the University of Missouri in Columbia, Missouri. He was graduated from Missouri Medical College at St. Louis in 1892. Irwin moved to New Athens, Illinois in the same year and commenced the practice of medicine. He served as chairman of the Republican county central committee from 1898 to 1924. He moved to Belleville, Illinois in 1903 and continued the practice of medicine. In addition, he served as Coroner of St. Clair County from 1904 to 1908.

Irwin was elected president of the Belleville Bank Trust Co. in 1910. He served as a delegate to the Republican National Convention in 1920. Irwin was elected as a Republican to the Sixty-ninth, Seventieth, and Seventy-first Congresses (March 4, 1925 – March 3, 1931). He served as chairman of the Committee on Claims (Seventy-first Congress). He was an unsuccessful candidate for reelection in 1930 to the Seventy-second Congress. After leaving Congress, he resumed the practice of his profession. He died in Belleville, Illinois on January 30, 1933, and was buried in Green Mount Cemetery.

U.S. House of Representatives
| Preceded by Edward E. Miller | Member of the U.S. House of Representatives from Illinois's 22nd congressional district 1925-1931 | Succeeded by Charles A. Karch |
