= Melvin Price =

American politician

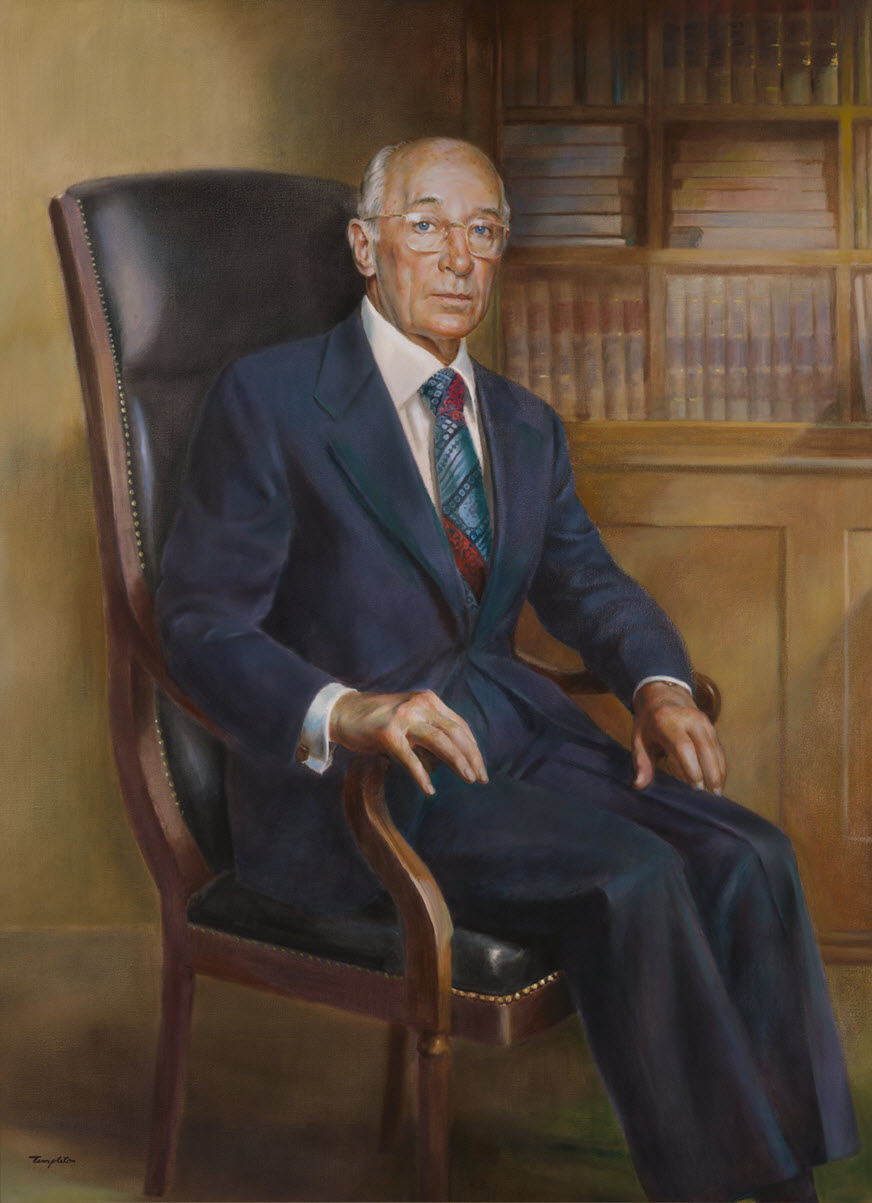

Member of the U.S. House of Representatives from Illinois
- In office January 3, 1945 – April 22, 1988
- Preceded by: Calvin D. Johnson
- Succeeded by: Jerry Costello
- Constituency: 22nd district (1945–1949); 25th district (1949–1953); 24th district (1953–1973); 23rd district (1973–1983); 21st district (1983–1988)

Chair of the House Committee on Armed Services
- In office January 3, 1975 – January 3, 1985
- Preceded by: F. Edward Hebert
- Succeeded by: Les Aspin

Personal details
- Born: Charles Melvin Price; January 1, 1905 East St. Louis, Illinois, U.S.
- Died: April 22, 1988 (aged 83) Camp Springs, Maryland, U.S.
- Party: Democratic
- Education: St. Louis University

Military service
- Allegiance: United States Army
- Branch/service: Quartermaster Corps
- Years of service: 1943–1944

Charles Melvin Price (January 1, 1905 – April 22, 1988) was a member of the United States House of Representatives for over 40 years, from 1945 to his death. He represented Metro East, the Illinois portion of the St. Louis metropolitan area.

== Early life ==
Charles Melvin Price was born in East St. Louis, Illinois on January 1, 1905. After a parochial school education, he graduated from St. Louis University High School and took two years of pre-law coursework at Saint Louis University. He became a sports correspondent for the East St. Louis Journal and later the St. Louis Globe-Democrat. He served as a member of the St. Clair County Board of Supervisors from 1929 to 1931. He served as secretary to U.S. Representative Edwin M. Schaefer during the latter's tenure from 1933 to 1943. In October 1943, during World War II, Price enlisted in the United States Army. He was stationed at Fort Lee at the time of his own election to the United States House of Representatives.

== United States House of Representatives ==
Price was elected to Congress in 1944. Most notably, he served as chairman of the House Armed Services Committee between 1975 and 1985. He lost this position at the beginning of the 99th United States Congress. Overthrowing a committee chairman was not a common occurrence at that time, but a majority of the House Democratic Caucus seemed to feel that the aged Price was no longer up to the job. In addition, Price, while liberal on domestic issues, was notably more supportive of defense spending than most Democrats. When it came to choosing Price's successor, the Caucus bypassed several other old hawkish members of the committee in favor of Les Aspin, who was not only much younger than Price and other more senior members, but also seemed closer in his defense policy preferences to the majority of the Democratic Caucus.

During his time in Congress, Price also chaired the Ethics Committee (1967–76) and the Joint Committee on Atomic Energy (1973–74). Price had a role in enacting the Price-Anderson Nuclear Industries Indemnity Act. He died in office in 1988 of pancreatic cancer. Price is the namesake of the Melvin Price Locks and Dam, near Alton, Illinois on the upper Mississippi River, and the Melvin Price Federal Building and United States Courthouse in East St. Louis.

In the special election to succeed Price, fellow Democrat and chairman of the St. Clair County Board Jerry Costello defeated Republican candidate Robert Gaffner. Costello took office August 9, 1988. He was elected to a full term that November with 53% of the vote.

== See also ==
- List of members of the United States Congress who died in office (1950–1999)

U.S. House of Representatives
Preceded by Calvin D. Johnson	Member of the U.S. House of Representatives from Illinois's 22nd congressional district 1945–1949	Succeeded by Rolla C. McMillen
Preceded by C. W. Bishop	Member of the U.S. House of Representatives from Illinois's 25th congressional district 1949–1953	Succeeded by C. W. Bishop
Preceded by Charles W. Vursell	Member of the U.S. House of Representatives from Illinois's 24th congressional district 1953–1973	Succeeded by Kenneth J. Gray
Preceded by George E. Shipley	Member of the U.S. House of Representatives from Illinois's 23rd congressional district 1973–1983	District eliminated
Preceded by Edward R. Madigan	Member of the U.S. House of Representatives from Illinois's 21st congressional district 1983–1988	Succeeded by Jerry Costello
Political offices
New office	Chair of the House Ethics Committee; 1967–1975	Succeeded by John Flynt
Preceded by F. Edward Hebert	Chair of the House Armed Services Committee; 1975–1985	Succeeded by Les Aspin
