= Frank W. Fries =

American politician (1893–1980)

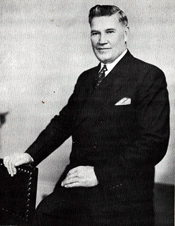

Member of the U.S. House of Representatives from Illinois's 21st district
- In office January 3, 1937 – January 3, 1941
- Preceded by: Harry H. Mason
- Succeeded by: George Evan Howell

Personal details
- Born: May 1, 1893 Cahokia Township, Macoupin County, Illinois, U.S.
- Died: July 17, 1980 (aged 87) Gillespie, Illinois, U.S.
- Resting place: Holy Cross Cemetery
- Party: Democratic

Frank William Fries (May 1, 1893 – July 17, 1980) was a U.S. Representative from Illinois.

Born in Hornsby, Cahokia Township, Macoupin County, Illinois, Fries moved with his parents to Gillespie, Illinois, in 1904. He attended the public schools. Coal miner 1915–1917. During the First World War he served as a sergeant in the Thirty-seventh Company, One Hundred and Fifty-third Depot Brigade, United States Army, from April 1918 to December 1918. He was a coal mine operator in 1920 and 1921. He engaged in the insurance business 1922–1927. He moved to Carlinville, Illinois, in 1930 and engaged in the wholesale produce business. Sheriff of Macoupin County 1930–1934. He served as member of the Illinois House of Representatives 1934–1936.

Fries was elected as a Democrat to the Seventy-fifth and Seventy-sixth Congresses (January 3, 1937 – January 3, 1941). He was an unsuccessful candidate for reelection in 1940 to the Seventy-seventh Congress. He was an arbitrator in the coal industry from 1941 to 1969. He was a resident of Gillespie, Illinois, until his death on July 17, 1980. He was interred in Holy Cross Cemetery.

U.S. House of Representatives
Preceded by Harry H. Mason	Member of the U.S. House of Representatives from Illinois's 21st congressional district 1937–1941	Succeeded by George Evan Howell
