= Jerry Costello =

American politician (born 1949)

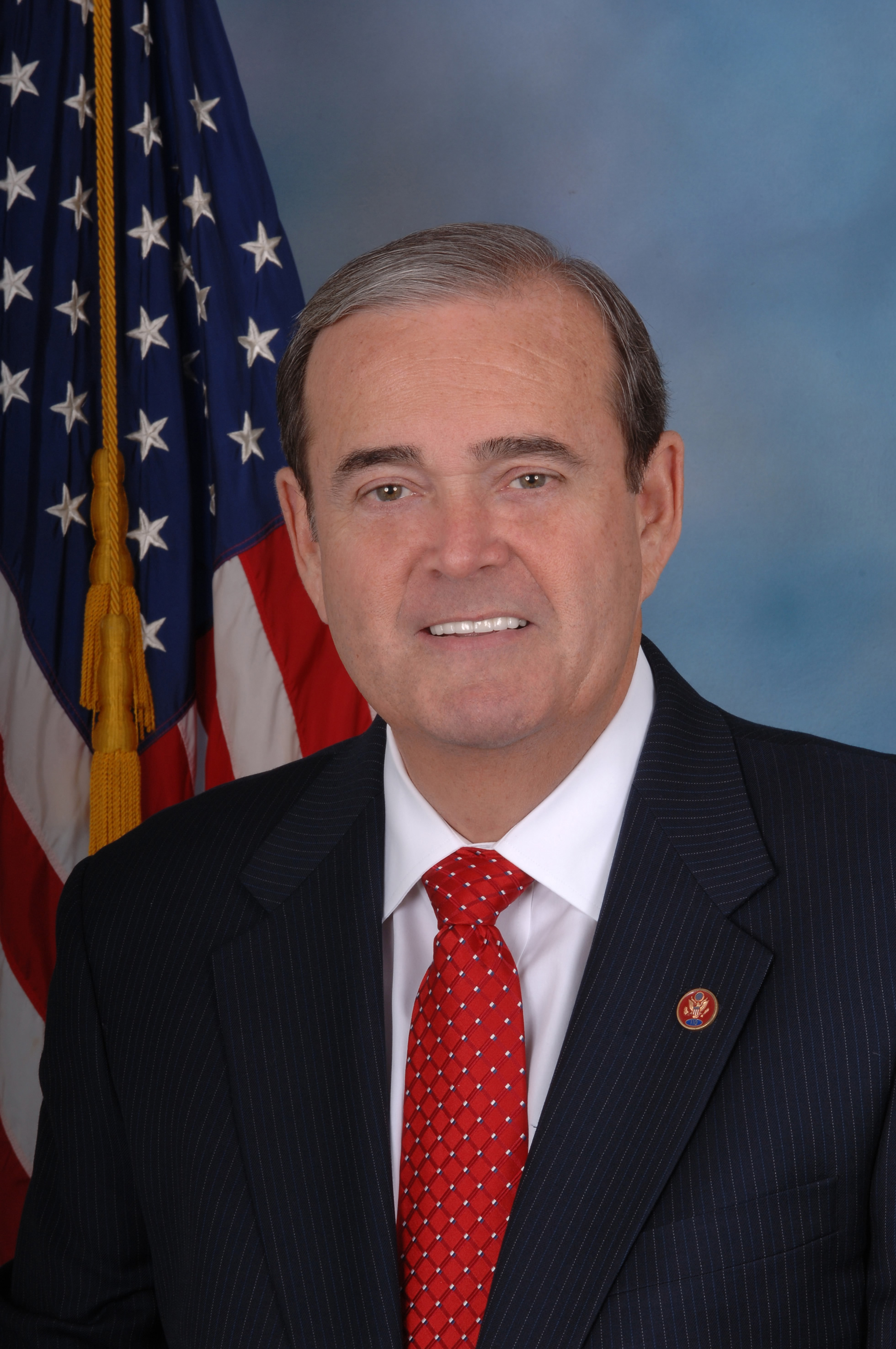

Member of the U.S. House of Representatives from Illinois
- In office August 9, 1988 – January 3, 2013 (Note: Costello's official service begins on the date of the special election, while he was not sworn in until August 11, 1988.)
- Preceded by: Melvin Price
- Succeeded by: William Enyart
- Constituency: 21st district (1988–1993); 12th district (1993–2013)

Personal details
- Born: Jerry Francis Costello; September 25, 1949 (age 76) East St. Louis, Illinois, U.S.
- Party: Democratic
- Spouse: Georgia Cockrum
- Education: Southwestern Illinois College; Maryville University (BA)

Jerry Francis Costello (born September 25, 1949) is an American politician and former U.S. Representative for Illinois's 12th congressional district. He previously represented Illinois's 21st congressional district and served in the US House from 1988 to 2013. He is a member of the Democratic Party and was the dean of Illinois's 21-member congressional delegation. In October 2011, Costello announced that he would not seek another term in Congress in 2012. He was succeeded by William Enyart.

== Early life, education, and early career ==
Costello was born in East St. Louis, Illinois and attended Catholic schools, graduating from Assumption High School. He was later educated at Maryville College of the Sacred Heart in St. Louis, from which he earned a bachelor's degree.

Costello worked in the law enforcement field. He served St. Clair County, Illinois as a court bailiff, deputy sheriff, and director of court services and probation. Costello later was chief investigator for the Illinois State Attorney’s office. In 1980, he was elected as chair of the St. Clair County Board. Costello served in this capacity as county executive until his election to the House.

== U.S. House of Representatives ==
=== Elections ===
Costello took office on in August 1988, after winning a special election with 51% of the vote, to fill the seat of the deceased Melvin Price. He was elected to a full term that November with 53% of the vote. After that, he received at least 60% of the vote in all of his re-election bids, until his retirement in 2012.

Costello was the most senior member of Illinois' House delegation during his final term in office. On October 4, 2011, he announced he would not seek reelection in 2012. Costello was succeeded by William Enyart, who was elected on November 6, 2012.

=== Tenure ===
Costello served on the National Leadership Committee of then-Senator Barack Obama's National Catholic Advisory Council during his 2008 election campaign.

Shortly after the election of Barack Obama as President of the United States, Costello was prominently mentioned as a possible cabinet choice for Secretary of Transportation; the nomination eventually went to fellow Illinois Representative Ray LaHood.

In 2011, Costello co-sponsored HR 3, the No Taxpayer Funding for Abortion Act, which would strictly limit the situations in which abortion could be paid for by public funds. Costello is a member of the Reformers Caucus of Issue One.

1997 ethics complaint

In 1996, federal prosecutors alleged that Costello was an unindicted co-conspirator in a plan to build a riverboat casino. At the end of an investigation and trial, a longtime friend of Costello's was sentenced to six years in prison for obstruction of justice. Costello testified before a grand jury in regard to the matter, but was not indicted or charged in the case. He denied any involvement. In 1997, the Congressional Accountability Project filed an ethics complaint requesting investigation of Costello which resulted in no action.

=== Committee assignments ===
- Committee on Science, Space and Technology
  - Subcommittee on Energy and Environment
- Committee on Transportation and Infrastructure
  - Subcommittee on Aviation (Ranking member)
  - Subcommittee on Railroads, Pipelines, and Hazardous Materials
  - Subcommittee on Water Resources and Environment

== Post-House ==
In 2016, Costello was a presidential elector from Illinois. Costello was originally intended to be an elector in the 2020 election as well; however, in the official vote he was replaced by Illinois House Speaker Chris Welch.

U.S. House of Representatives
Preceded by Melvin Price	Member of the U.S. House of Representatives from Illinois's 21st congressional district 1988–1993	Constituency abolished
Preceded by Phil Crane	Member of the U.S. House of Representatives from Illinois's 12th congressional district 1993–2013	Succeeded by William Enyart
U.S. order of precedence (ceremonial)
Preceded by Billy Tauzin as Former U.S. Representative	Order of precedence of the United States as Former U.S. Representative	Succeeded by John Shimkus as Former U.S. Representative
