= James Earl Major =

American judge (1887–1972)

J. Earl Major
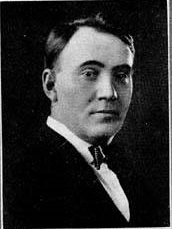

Senior Judge of the United States Court of Appeals for the Seventh Circuit
- In office March 23, 1956 – January 4, 1972

Chief Judge of the United States Court of Appeals for the Seventh Circuit
- In office 1948–1954
- Preceded by: William Morris Sparks
- Succeeded by: F. Ryan Duffy

Judge of the United States Court of Appeals for the Seventh Circuit
- In office March 23, 1937 – March 23, 1956
- Appointed by: Franklin D. Roosevelt
- Preceded by: Louis FitzHenry
- Succeeded by: John Simpson Hastings

Judge of the United States District Court for the Southern District of Illinois
- In office June 12, 1933 – April 5, 1937
- Appointed by: Franklin D. Roosevelt
- Preceded by: Louis FitzHenry
- Succeeded by: J. Leroy Adair

Member of the U.S. House of Representatives from Illinois's 21st district
- In office March 4, 1931 – October 6, 1933
- Preceded by: Frank M. Ramey
- Succeeded by: Harry H. Mason
- In office March 4, 1927 – March 3, 1929
- Preceded by: Loren E. Wheeler
- Succeeded by: Frank M. Ramey
- In office March 4, 1923 – March 3, 1925
- Preceded by: Loren E. Wheeler
- Succeeded by: Loren E. Wheeler

Personal details
- Born: James Earl Major; January 5, 1887 Donnellson, Illinois, U.S.
- Died: January 4, 1972 (aged 84) Hillsboro, Illinois, U.S.
- Resting place: Oak Grove Cemetery
- Party: Democratic
- Education: Illinois College of Law, subsequently acquired by DePaul University

James Earl Major (January 5, 1887 – January 4, 1972) was an American lawyer, jurist, and politician. He served as a United States representative from Illinois, a United States circuit judge of the United States Court of Appeals for the Seventh Circuit and a United States district judge of the United States District Court for the Southern District of Illinois.

== Education and career ==
Born in Donnellson, Illinois, Major attended the common and high schools of his native city. He graduated from Brown's Business College in 1907 and from the Illinois College of Law (now DePaul University College of Law) at Chicago in 1909. He was admitted to the bar in 1910 and commenced the practice of law in Hillsboro, Illinois in 1912. He served as prosecuting attorney of Montgomery County, Illinois from 1912 to 1920.

== Congressional service ==
Major was elected as a Democrat to the 68th United States Congress, serving from March 4, 1923, to March 3, 1925. He was an unsuccessful candidate for reelection in 1924 to the 69th Congress. He resumed the practice law in Hillsboro until he was elected to the 70th Congress, serving from March 4, 1927, to March 3, 1929. He was an unsuccessful candidate for reelection in 1928 to the 71st Congress, but was elected to the 72nd and 73rd Congresses and served from March 4, 1931, until his resignation on October 6, 1933, having been appointed to the bench. During his final term, he was one of the managers appointed by the United States House of Representatives in 1933 to conduct the impeachment proceedings against Harold Louderback, Judge of the United States District Court for the Northern District of California.

== Federal judicial service ==
Major received a recess appointment from President Franklin D. Roosevelt on June 12, 1933, to a seat on the United States District Court for the Southern District of Illinois vacated by Judge Louis FitzHenry. He was nominated to the same position by President Roosevelt on January 8, 1934. He was confirmed by the United States Senate on January 23, 1934, and received his commission on January 26, 1934. His service terminated on April 5, 1937, due to his elevation to the Seventh Circuit.

Major was nominated by President Roosevelt on March 9, 1937, to a seat on the United States Court of Appeals for the Seventh Circuit vacated by Judge Louis FitzHenry. He was confirmed by the Senate on March 17, 1937, and received his commission on March 23, 1937. He served as Chief Judge from 1948 to 1954 and served as a member of the Judicial Conference of the United States from 1949 to 1954. He assumed senior status on March 23, 1956.

== Death ==
Major died on January 4, 1972, in Hillsboro, where he had resided. He was interred in Oak Grove Cemetery.

== Sources ==
- United States Congress. "James Earl Major (id: M000073)". Biographical Directory of the United States Congress.

U.S. House of Representatives
Preceded by Loren E. Wheeler	Member of the U.S. House of Representatives from Illinois's 21st congressional district 1923–1925	Succeeded by Loren E. Wheeler
Preceded by Loren E. Wheeler	Member of the U.S. House of Representatives from Illinois's 21st congressional district 1927–1929	Succeeded by Frank M. Ramey
Preceded by Frank M. Ramey	Member of the U.S. House of Representatives from Illinois's 21st congressional district 1931–1933	Succeeded by Harry H. Mason
Legal offices
Preceded by Louis FitzHenry	Judge of the United States District Court for the Southern District of Illinois; 1933–1937	Succeeded by J. Leroy Adair
Preceded by Louis FitzHenry	Judge of the United States Court of Appeals for the Seventh Circuit; 1937–1956	Succeeded by John Simpson Hastings
Preceded by William Morris Sparks	Chief Judge of the United States Court of Appeals for the Seventh Circuit; 1948–1954	Succeeded by F. Ryan Duffy
