= Melvin Price Federal Building and United States Courthouse =

- United States Post Office and Courthouse
- U.S. National Register of Historic Places
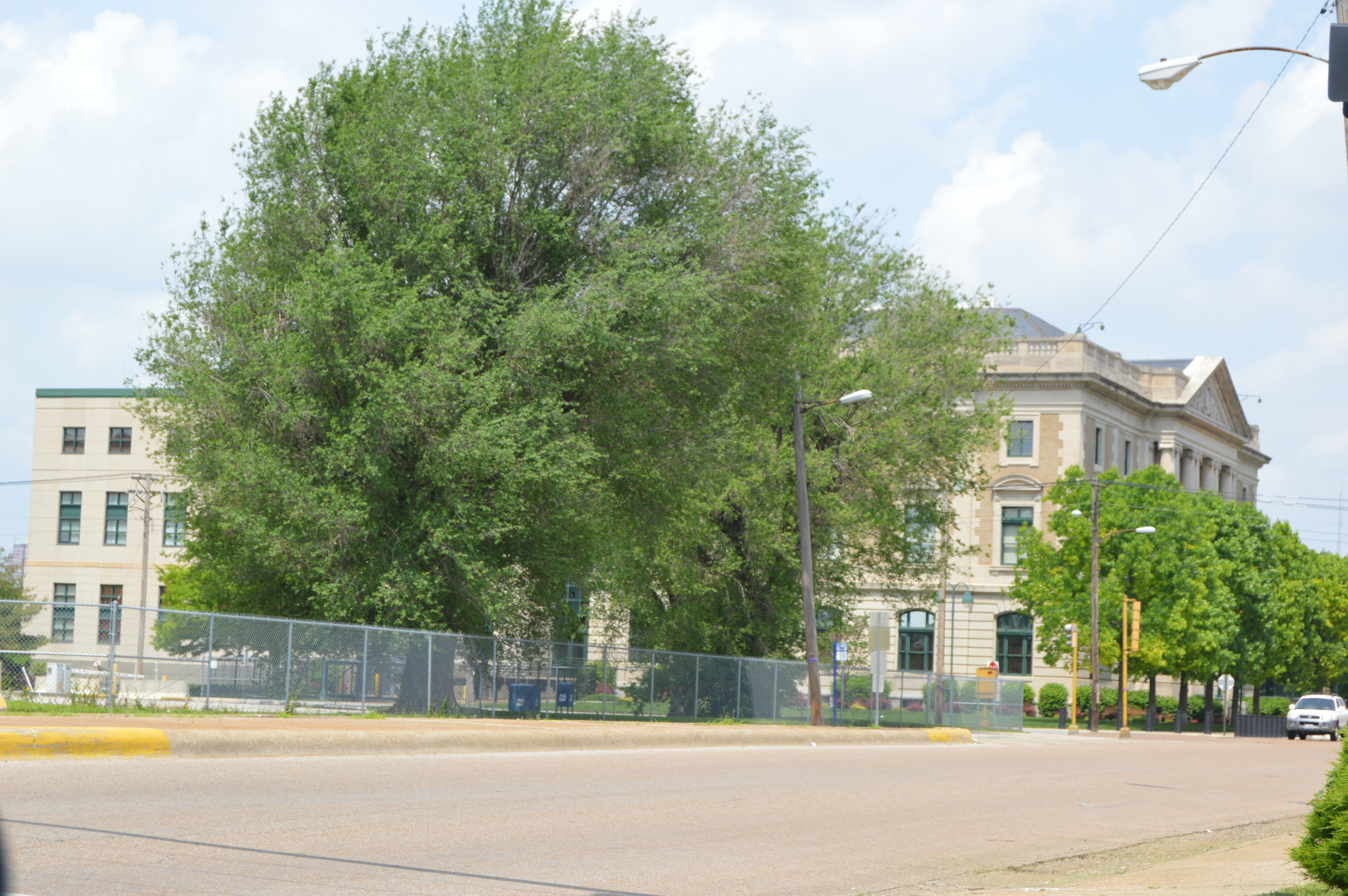

- Location within Illinois Location within the United States
- Location: 750 Missouri Ave., East St. Louis, Illinois
- Coordinates: 38.6238°N 90.1565°W
- Built: 1908-09
- Architectural style: Beaux-Arts
- NRHP reference No.: 14000478
- Added to NRHP: August 8, 2014

The Melvin Price Federal Building and United States Courthouse, historically known as the United States Post Office and Courthouse, is a historic federal building located at 750 Missouri Avenue in East St. Louis, Illinois. The building served as the city's main post office and still serves as the courthouse of the Southern District of Illinois; it is named for U.S. Representative Charles Melvin Price. Supervising Architect James Knox Taylor designed the Beaux-Arts building in 1907; construction began the following year and was completed in 1909. The building's design features a projecting pavilion above the front entrance with four pairs of columns supporting a pediment; the columns frame a three-bay arcade which once housed the courtroom windows. Quoins at the corners and on projecting elements, alternating arched and pedimented windows on the second floor, and a cornice with a balustrade also decorate the building. Two wings in a matching design were added to the building in 1918, and a modern annex was placed on the rear in 1986.

The building was added to the National Register of Historic Places on August 8, 2014.
