= Louis FitzHenry =

American judge (1870-1935)

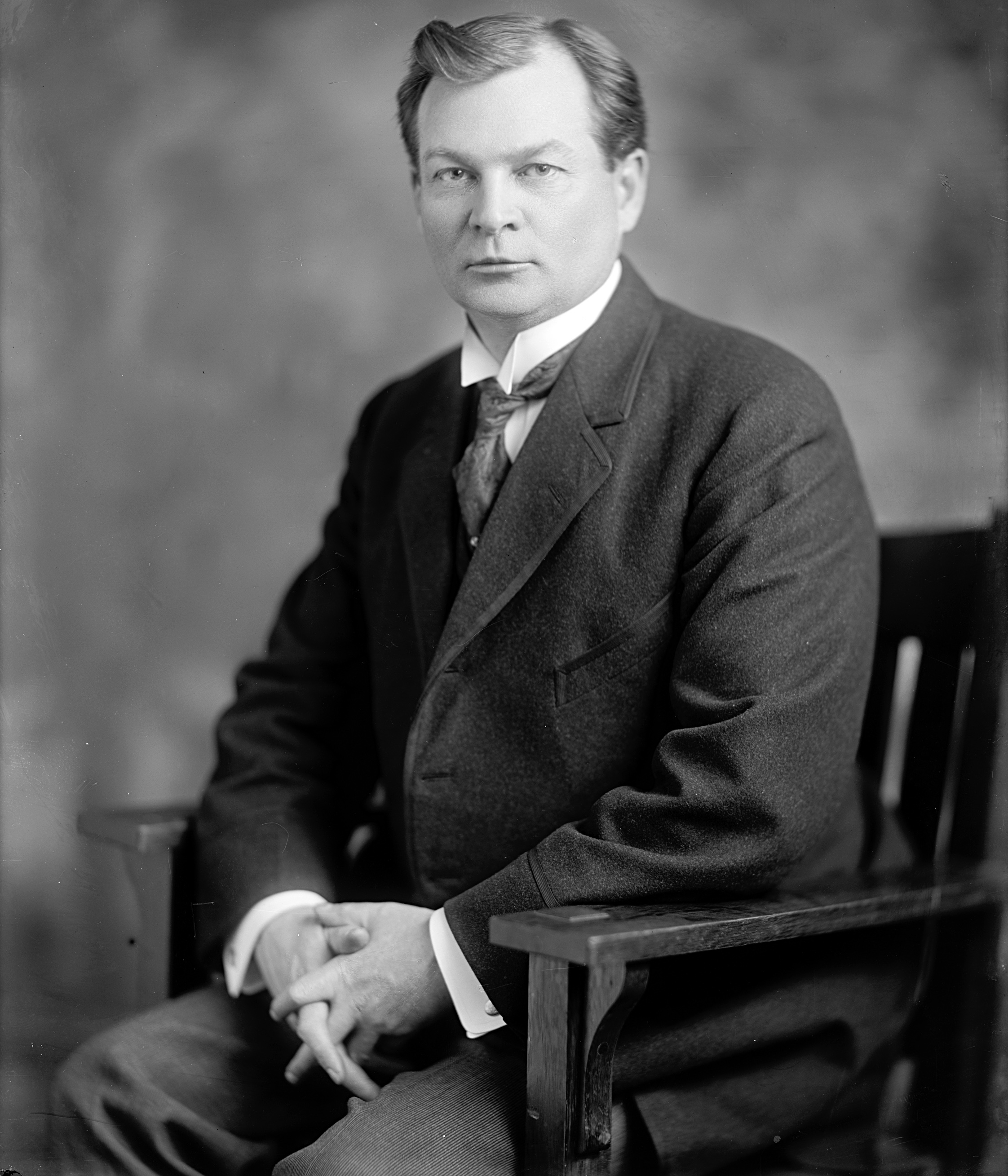
- FitzHenry, 1905–1935

Judge of the United States Court of Appeals for the Seventh Circuit
- In office June 16, 1933 – November 18, 1935
- Appointed by: Franklin D. Roosevelt
- Preceded by: George True Page
- Succeeded by: James Earl Major

Judge of the United States District Court for the Southern District of Illinois
- In office July 6, 1918 – October 3, 1933
- Appointed by: Woodrow Wilson
- Preceded by: J. Otis Humphrey
- Succeeded by: James Earl Major

Member of the U.S. House of Representatives from Illinois's 17th district
- In office March 4, 1913 – March 3, 1915
- Preceded by: John Allen Sterling
- Succeeded by: John Allen Sterling

Personal details
- Born: Louis FitzHenry; June 13, 1870 Bloomington, Illinois, U.S.
- Died: November 18, 1935 (aged 65) Normal, Illinois, U.S.
- Resting place: Bloomington Cemetery; Bloomington, Illinois
- Party: Democratic
- Education: Illinois Wesleyan University Law School (LLB)

Louis FitzHenry (June 13, 1870 – November 18, 1935) was a United States representative from Illinois, a United States circuit judge of the United States Court of Appeals for the Seventh Circuit and a United States district judge of the United States District Court for the Southern District of Illinois.

== Education and career ==
Born in Bloomington, Illinois, FitzHenry attended the public and high schools of Bloomington and, engaged in journalism before receiving a Bachelor of Laws from the law school (now defunct) at Illinois Wesleyan University in 1897. He was admitted to the bar in 1897 and commenced private practice in Bloomington from 1897 to 1907, and was city attorney of Bloomington from 1907 to 1911.

== Congressional service ==
FitzHenry was an unsuccessful candidate for election in 1910 to the 62nd United States Congress, but was elected as a Democrat to the 63rd United States Congress, serving from March 4, 1913 to March 3, 1915. He was an unsuccessful candidate for reelection in 1914 to the 64th United States Congress, and thereafter resumed the practice of law in Bloomington from 1915 to 1918. He was an unsuccessful candidate for election as a Justice of the Illinois Supreme Court in 1915.

== Federal judicial service ==
FitzHenry was nominated by President Woodrow Wilson on July 1, 1918, to a seat on the United States District Court for the Southern District of Illinois vacated by Judge J. Otis Humphrey. He was confirmed by the United States Senate on July 6, 1918, and received his commission on July 6, 1918. His service terminated on October 3, 1933, due to his elevation to the Seventh Circuit.

FitzHenry was nominated by President Franklin D. Roosevelt on June 3, 1933, to a seat on the United States Court of Appeals for the Seventh Circuit vacated by Judge George True Page. He was confirmed by the Senate on June 10, 1933, and received his commission on June 16, 1933. His service terminated on November 18, 1935, due to his death in Normal, Illinois. He was interred in Bloomington Cemetery in Bloomington.

U.S. House of Representatives
Preceded by John Allen Sterling	Member of the U.S. House of Representatives from Illinois's 17th congressional district 1913–1915	Succeeded by John Allen Sterling
Legal offices
Preceded by J. Otis Humphrey	Judge of the United States District Court for the Southern District of Illinois; 1918–1933	Succeeded by James Earl Major
Preceded by George True Page	Judge of the United States Court of Appeals for the Seventh Circuit; 1933–1935	Succeeded by James Earl Major
