= List of United States senators in the 59th Congress =

This is a complete list of United States senators during the 59th United States Congress listed by seniority from March 4, 1905, to March 3, 1907.

Order of service is based on the commencement of the senator's first term. Behind this is former service as a senator (only giving the senator seniority within their new incoming class), service as vice president, a House member, a cabinet secretary, or a governor of a state. The final factor is the population of the senator's state.

Senators who were sworn in during the middle of the Congress (up until the last senator who was not sworn in early after winning the November 1906 election) are listed at the end of the list with no number.

== Terms of service ==
Class	Terms of service of senators that expired in years
Class 3	Terms of service of senators that expired in 1907 (AL, AR, CA, CO, CT, FL, GA, IA, ID, IL, IN, KS, KY, LA, MD, MO, NC, ND, NH, NV, NY, OH, OR, PA, SC, SD, UT, VT, WA, and WI.)
Class 1	Terms of service of senators that expired in 1909 (CA, CT, DE, FL, IN, MA, MD, ME, MI, MN, MO, MS, MT, ND, NE, NJ, NV, NY, OH, PA, RI, TN, TX, UT, VA, VT, WA, WI, WV, and WY.)
Class 2	Terms of service of senators that expired in 1911 (AL, AR, CO, DE, GA, IA, ID, IL, KS, KY, LA, MA, ME, MI, MN, MS, MT, NC, NE, NH, NJ, OR, RI, SC, SD, TN, TX, VA, WV, and WY.)

== U.S. Senate seniority list ==
U.S. Senate seniority
Rank	Senator (party-state)	Seniority date	Other factors
1	William B. Allison (R-IA)	March 4, 1873	Former representative
2	John Tyler Morgan (D-AL)	March 4, 1877	
3	Orville H. Platt (R-CT)	March 4, 1879	
4	Eugene Hale (R-ME)	March 4, 1881	Former representative
5	William P. Frye (R-ME)	March 18, 1881	Former representative
6	Nelson Aldrich (R-RI)	October 5, 1881	Former representative
7	Shelby Moore Cullom (R-IL)	March 4, 1883	Former governor, Former representative
8	Henry M. Teller (D-CO)	March 4, 1885	Previously a senator
9	James H. Berry (D-AR)	March 20, 1885	Former governor
10	John W. Daniel (D-VA)	March 4, 1887	Former representative
11	William B. Bate (D-TN)	March 4, 1887	Former governor
12	Jacob H. Gallinger (R-NH)	March 4, 1891	Former representative (4 years)
13	Henry C. Hansbrough (R-ND)	March 4, 1891	Former representative (2 years)
14	Redfield Proctor (R-VT)	November 2, 1891	Former governor
15	Henry Cabot Lodge (R-MA)	March 4, 1893	Former representative
16	George C. Perkins (R-CA)	July 26, 1893	Former governor
17	Julius C. Burrows (R-MI)	January 23, 1895	Former representative
18	Clarence D. Clark (R-WY)	January 24, 1895	
19	Francis E. Warren (R-WY)	March 4, 1895	Previously a senator
20	Stephen Elkins (R-WV)	March 4, 1895	Former delegate, former cabinet member
21	Knute Nelson (R-MN)	March 4, 1895	Former governor, Minnesota 20th in population (1890)
22	Benjamin Tillman (D-SC)	March 4, 1895	Former governor, South Carolina 23rd in population (1890)
23	George P. Wetmore (R-RI)	March 4, 1895	Former governor, Rhode Island 36th in population (1890)
24	Augustus O. Bacon (D-GA)	March 4, 1895	Georgia 12th in population (1890)
25	Thomas S. Martin (D-VA)	March 4, 1895	Virginia 15th in population (1890)
26	John C. Spooner (R-WI)	March 4, 1897	Previously a senator (6 years)
27	Thomas C. Platt (R-NY)	March 4, 1897	Previously a senator (2 months)
28	Joseph Foraker (R-OH)	March 4, 1897	Former governor, Ohio 4th in population (1890)
29	Samuel McEnery (D-LA)	March 4, 1897	Former governor, Louisiana 25th in population (1890)
30	Boies Penrose (R-PA)	March 4, 1897	Pennsylvania 2nd in population (1890)
31	Alexander Clay (D-GA)	March 4, 1897	Georgia 12th in population (1890)
32	Edmund Pettus (D-AL)	March 4, 1897	Alabama 17th in population (1890)
33	Stephen Mallory (D-FL)	May 15, 1897	Former representative
34	Hernando Money (D-MS)	October 8, 1897	Former representative
35	John Kean (R-NJ)	March 4, 1899	Former representative
36	Charles A. Culberson (D-TX)	March 4, 1899	Former governor
37	Chauncey Depew (R-NY)	March 4, 1899	New York 1st in population (1890)
38	Albert J. Beveridge (R-IN)	March 4, 1899	Indiana 8th in population (1890)
39	Nathan B. Scott (R-WV)	March 4, 1899	West Virginia 28th in population (1890)
40	Porter McCumber (R-ND)	March 4, 1899	North Dakota 41st in population (1890)
41	James Taliaferro (D-FL)	April 20, 1899	
42	Jonathan P. Dolliver (R-IA)	August 22, 1900	Former representative
43	William P. Dillingham (R-VT)	October 18, 1900	Former governor
44	Moses Clapp (R-MN)	January 23, 1901	
45	John H. Mitchell (R-OR)	March 4, 1901	Previously a senator (18 years)
46	Joseph C. S. Blackburn (D-KY)	March 4, 1901	Previously a senator (12 years)
47	Fred Dubois (D-ID)	March 4, 1901	Previously a senator (6 years)
48	William A. Clark (D-MT)	March 4, 1901	Previously a senator (1 year, 2 months)
49	Anselm J. McLaurin (D-MS)	March 4, 1901	Previously a senator (1 year, 1 month)
50	Joseph W. Bailey (D-TX)	March 4, 1901	Former representative (10 years)
51	Edward W. Carmack (D-TN)	March 4, 1901	Former representative (4 years), Tennessee 13th in population (1890)
52	Robert J. Gamble (R-SD)	March 4, 1901	Former representative (4 years), South Dakota 35th in population (1890)
53	Furnifold M. Simmons (D-NC)	March 4, 1901	Former representative (2 years), North Carolina 16th in population (1890)
54	Thomas Patterson (D-CO)	March 4, 1901	Former representative (2 years), Colorado 31st in population (1890)
55	Murphy J. Foster (D-LA)	March 4, 1901	Former governor
56	Joseph Burton (R-KS)	March 4, 1901	Kansas 19th in population (1890)
57	Henry E. Burnham (R-NH)	March 4, 1901	New Hampshire 33rd in population (1890)
58	Joseph Millard (R-NE)	March 28, 1901	
59	Alfred B. Kittredge (R-SD)	July 1, 1901	
60	John F. Dryden (R-NJ)	January 29, 1902	
61	Russell A. Alger (R-MI)	September 27, 1902	
62	Frank Allee (R-DE)	March 2, 1903	
63	Arthur P. Gorman (R-MD)	March 4, 1903	Previously a senator
64	Albert J. Hopkins (R-IL)	March 4, 1903	Former representative (18 years)
65	James B. McCreary (D-KY)	March 4, 1903	Former representative (12 years)
66	Asbury Latimer (D-SC)	March 4, 1903	Former representative (10 years), South Carolina 24th in population (1900)
67	Francis Newlands (D-NV)	March 4, 1903	Former representative (10 years), Nevada 46th in population (1900)
68	Chester Long (R-KS)	March 4, 1903	Former representative (6 years)
69	William J. Stone (D-MO)	March 4, 1903	Former governor, Missouri 5th in population (1900)
70	James P. Clarke (D-AR)	March 4, 1903	Former governor, Arkansas 25th in population (1900)
71	Lee S. Overman (D-NC)	March 4, 1903	North Carolina 15th in population (1900)
72	Levi Ankeny (R-WA)	March 4, 1903	Washington 34th in population (1900)
73	Charles W. Fulton (R-OR)	March 4, 1903	Oregon 36th in population (1900)
74	Reed Smoot (R-UT)	March 4, 1903	Utah 41st in population (1900)
75	Weldon B. Heyburn (R-ID)	March 4, 1903	Idaho 44th in population (1900)
76	Charles Dick (R-OH)	March 23, 1904	Former representative
77	Philander C. Knox (R-PA)	June 10, 1904	
78	Winthrop M. Crane (R-MA)	October 12, 1904	Former governor
79	Thomas Carter (R-MT)	March 4, 1905	Previously a senator
80	James Hemenway (R-IN)	March 4, 1905	Former representative (10 years)
81	Isidor Rayner (D-MD)	March 4, 1905	Former representative (6 years), Maryland 26th in population (1900)
82	Elmer Burkett (R-NE)	March 4, 1905	Former representative (6 years), Nebraska 27th in population (1900)
83	George Sutherland (R-UT)	March 4, 1905	Former representative (2 years)
84	Morgan Bulkeley (R-CT)	March 4, 1905	Former governor
85	Frank P. Flint (R-CA)	March 4, 1905	California 21st in population (1900)
86	Samuel H. Piles (R-WA)	March 4, 1905	Washington 34th in population (1900)
87	George S. Nixon (R-NV)	March 4, 1905	Nevada 46th in population (1900)
88	William Warner (R-MO)	March 18, 1905	Former representative
	James B. Frazier (D-TN)	March 21, 1905	
	Frank B. Brandegee (R-CT)	May 10, 1905	
	John M. Gearin (D-OR)	December 13, 1905	
89	Robert M. La Follette, Sr. (R-WI)	January 4, 1906	Former representative, Former governor
	William Pinkney Whyte (D-MD)	June 8, 1906	Former governor, Previously a senator (twice)
	Alfred Benson (R-KS)	June 11, 1906	
90	Henry du Pont (R-DE)	June 13, 1906	
	Frederick Mulkey (R-OR)	January 23, 1907	
	Charles Curtis (R-KS)	January 29, 1907	Former representative
	William A. Smith (R-MI)	February 9, 1907	

== See also ==
- 59th United States Congress
- List of United States representatives in the 59th Congress
