= Harry H. Mason =

American politician (1873–1946)

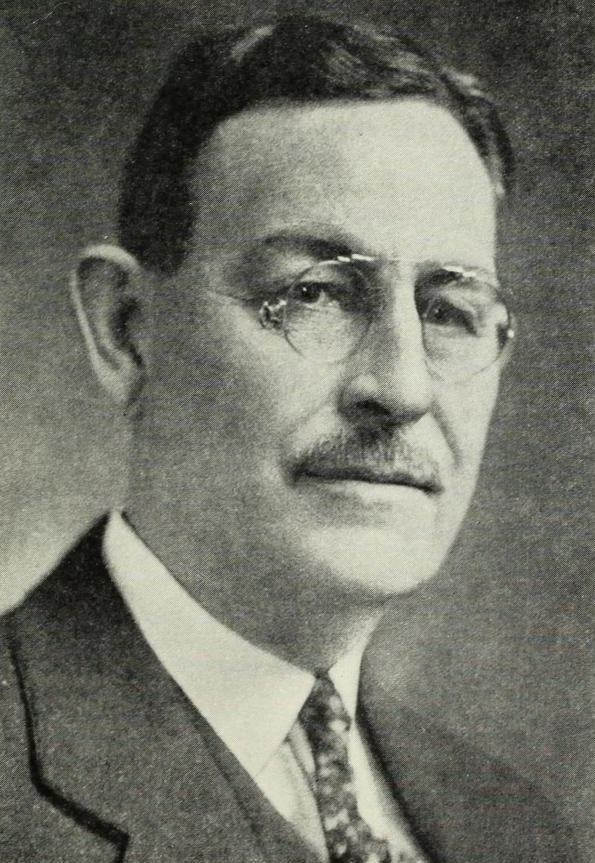
- Mason in 1912

Member of the U.S. House of Representatives from Illinois's 21st district
- In office January 3, 1935 – January 3, 1937
- Preceded by: James Earl Major
- Succeeded by: Frank W. Fries

Personal details
- Born: Harry Howland Mason; December 16, 1873 Farmer City, Illinois, US
- Died: March 10, 1946 (aged 72) Springfield, Illinois, US
- Party: Democratic
- Occupation: Politician, newspaper publisher

Harry Howland Mason (December 16, 1873 – March 10, 1946) was an American politician and newspaper publisher. A Democrat, he was a member of the United States House of Representatives from Illinois.

== Biography ==
Mason was born on December 16, 1873, in Farmer City, Illinois, the son of James A. Mason and Lovenia F. Mason. He later moved to Delavan, where he received his education at local public schools. After schooling, he worked for the Delevan Advertiser. In 1903, he moved to Pawnee, where he was also operated the Pawnee Herald. For eight years, he was president of the Central Illinois Press Association.

Mason was a Democrat. In 1930, he was acting secretary of the Sangamon County Democratic Committee. From 1930 to 1933, he was the secretary of James Earl Major, and from July 21, 1933, to 1934, was treasurer of Sangamon County.

Mason was a member of the United States House of Representatives, from January 3, 1935, to January 3, 1937, representing Illinois's 21st district. He refused to run in the following election. In the election, his name was put three times in the race for justice of the peace with him labelled as a Republican, as a practical joke. Politically, he was a moderate conservative. His stance on foreign policy caused schisms among his voterbase.

After serving in Congress, Mason returned to newspaper publishing in Pawnee. From 1942 to 1944, he was circuit clerk of Sangamon County, serving while his predecessor was fighting in World War II. On August 17, 1912, he married Mabel Pennoyer. He was Presbyterian. He died on March 10, 1946, aged 72, in Springfield, and was buried at Prairie Rest Cemetery, in Delavan.

U.S. House of Representatives
Preceded by James Earl Major	Member of the U.S. House of Representatives from Illinois's 21st congressional district 1935–1937	Succeeded by Frank W. Fries
