= James A. Connolly =

American politician

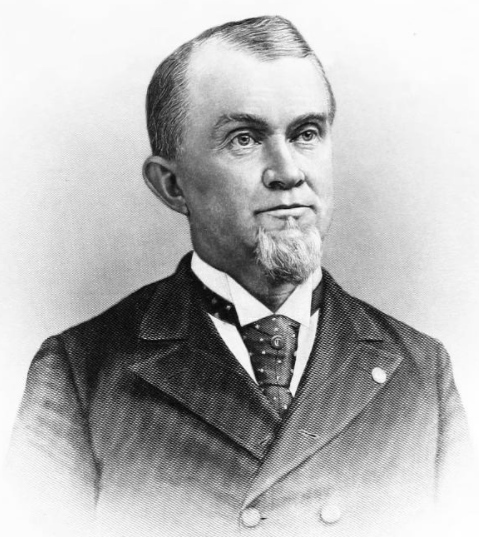

Member of the U.S. House of Representatives from Illinois's 17th district
- In office March 4, 1895 – March 3, 1899
- Preceded by: Edward Lane
- Succeeded by: Ben F. Caldwell

Member of the Illinois House of Representatives
- In office 1872-1876

Personal details
- Born: James Austin Connolly; March 8, 1843 Newark, New Jersey
- Died: December 15, 1914 (aged 71) Springfield, Illinois
- Resting place: Oak Ridge Cemetery
- Party: Republican
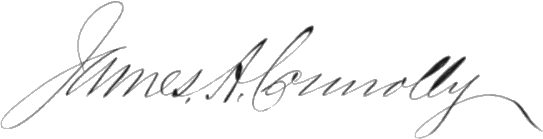
- Signature

James Austin Connolly (March 8, 1843 – December 15, 1914) was an American lawyer, Civil War veteran, and politician who served two terms as a U.S. representative from Illinois from 1895 to 1899.

== Biography ==
James A. Connolly was born in Newark, New Jersey on March 8, 1843, into a family of Irish descent. (Note: Some sources give his birthdate as March 8, 1842.) He moved to Chesterville, Ohio with his parents in 1850.

He attended the common schools and Selby Academy, Chesterville. He served as assistant clerk of the State Senate in 1858 and 1859. He studied law. He was admitted to the bar in 1859 and practiced in Mount Gilead, Ohio. He moved to Charleston, Illinois, in 1861, where he was admitted to the bar.

=== Civil War ===
After the outbreak of the American Civil War, Connolly enlisted in the Union Army as a private in the 123rd Illinois Volunteer Infantry Regiment, in 1862 and was afterwards captain, major, and brevet lieutenant colonel.

=== Political career ===
Connolly served as member of the State House of Representatives from 1872 to 1876, after which he was appointed the United States attorney for the southern district of Illinois, serving from 1876–1885 and again from 1889–1893.

He ran unsuccessfully for election in 1886 to the Fiftieth Congress. He was again nominated in 1888 but declined to run.

=== Tenure in Congress ===
Connolly was elected as a Republican to the Fifty-fourth and Fifty-fifth Congress (March 4, 1895 – March 3, 1899).

=== Later career and death ===
He was not a candidate for renomination in 1898. He resumed the practice of law in Springfield, Illinois, where he died on December 15, 1914. He was interred in Oak Ridge Cemetery.

== Notes ==
U.S. House of Representatives
Preceded by Edward Lane	Member of the U.S. House of Representatives from Illinois's 17th congressional district 1895-1899	Succeeded by Ben F. Caldwell
