= James M. Graham =

American politician

James MacMahon Graham
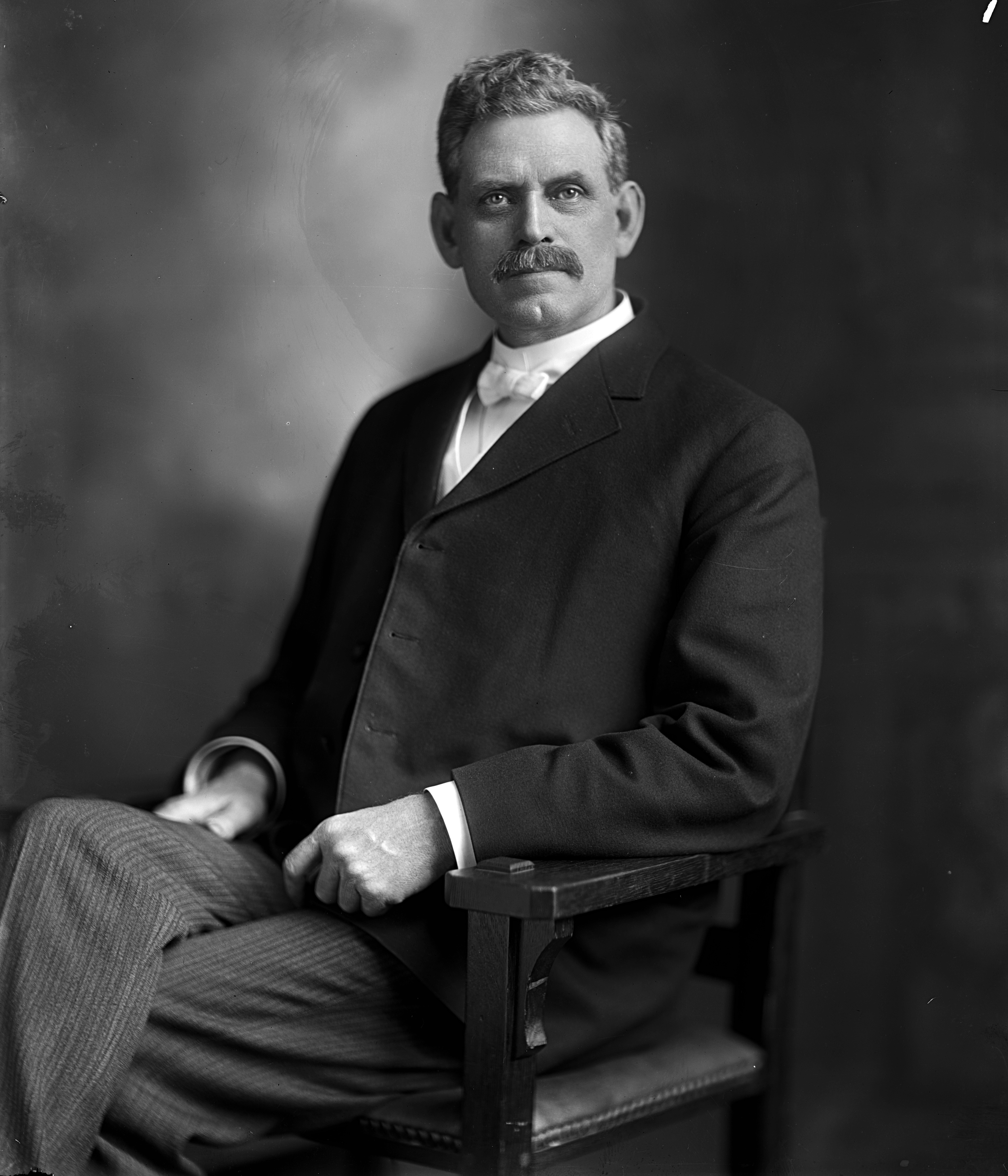

Member of the U.S. House of Representatives from Illinois's 21st district
- In office March 4, 1909 – March 3, 1915
- Preceded by: Ben F. Caldwell
- Succeeded by: Loren E. Wheeler

Personal details
- Born: April 14, 1852 Castleblayney, County Monaghan, Ireland
- Died: October 23, 1945 (aged 93) Springfield, Illinois
- Party: Democratic

James McMahon Graham (April 14, 1852 – October 23, 1945) was a United States representative from Illinois.

Born in Castleblayney, County Monaghan, Ireland, he immigrated to the United States and settled in Sangamon County, Illinois in 1868. He attended the University of Illinois at Urbana-Champaign and attended Valparaiso University; he was a teacher, lawyer in private practice, and in 1885-1886 a member of the Illinois House of Representatives. He was prosecuting attorney for Sangamon County from 1892 to 1896 and a member of the board of education of Springfield, Illinois from 1891 to 1894.

Graham was elected as a Democrat to the Sixty-first and to the two succeeding Congresses (March 4, 1909 – March 3, 1915); he was chairman of the Committee on Expenditures in the Department of the Interior (Sixty-second and Sixty-third Congresses). He was an unsuccessful candidate for reelection to the Sixty-fourth Congress in 1914. From 1916 to 1928, he was a member of the National Conference of Commissioners on Uniform State Laws and a member of the board of directors of Lincoln Library from 1936 to 1945. In the latter year, he died in Springfield; interment was in Calvary Cemetery, Springfield.

In 2010, a memorial plaque was unveiled in his honor at the Iontas Community Resource & Arts Centre in his native Castleblayney in Ireland.

U.S. House of Representatives
Preceded by Ben F. Caldwell	Member of the U.S. House of Representatives from Illinois's 21st congressional district 1909–1915	Succeeded by Loren E. Wheeler
