= William A. Rodenberg =

American politician (1865–1937)

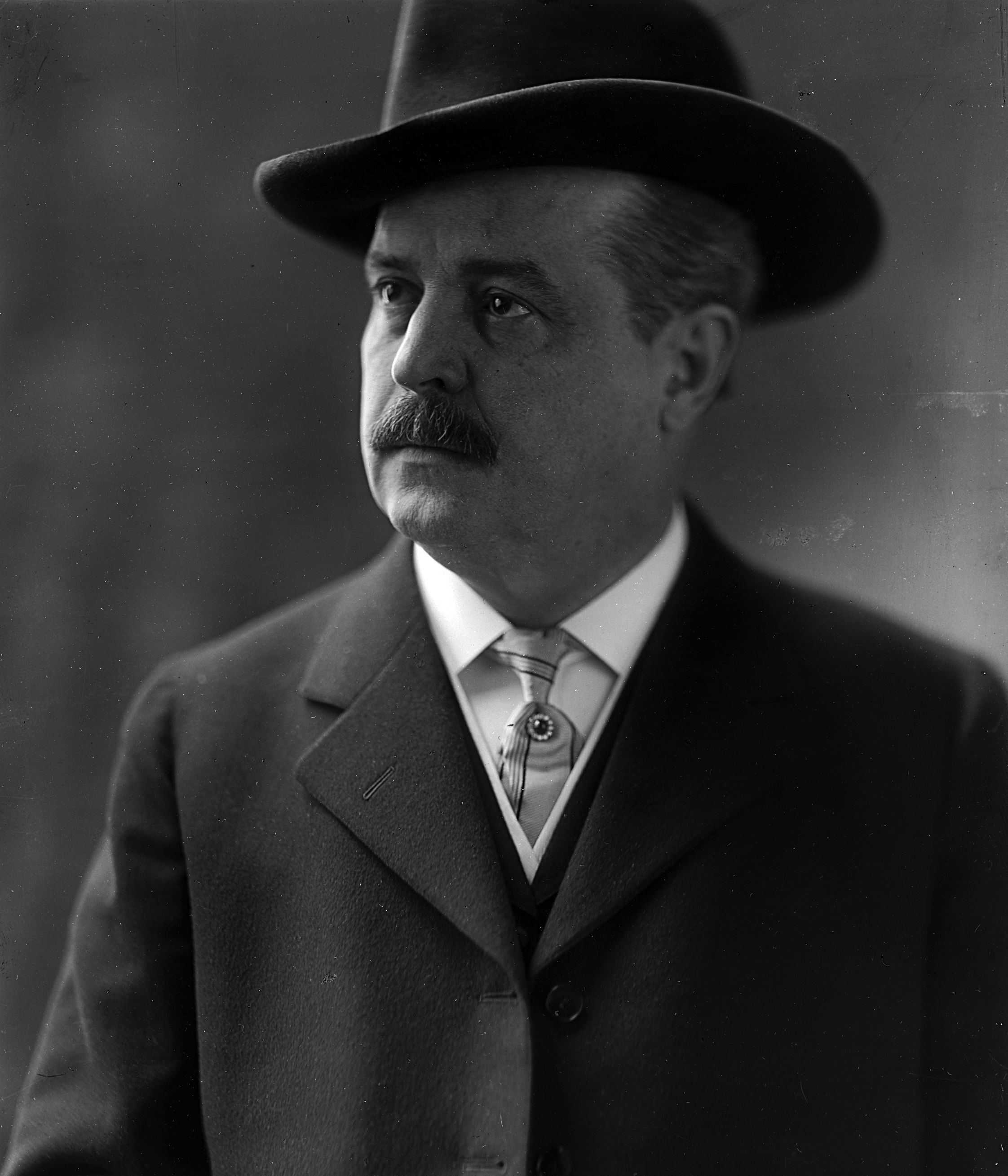
- Rodenberg, 1905–1937

Member of the U.S. House of Representatives from Illinois's 22nd district
- In office March 4, 1915 – March 3, 1923
- Preceded by: William N. Baltz
- Succeeded by: Edward E. Miller
- In office March 4, 1903 – March 3, 1913
- Preceded by: George Washington Smith
- Succeeded by: William N. Baltz

Member of the U.S. House of Representatives from Illinois's 21st district
- In office March 4, 1899 – March 3, 1901
- Preceded by: Jehu Baker
- Succeeded by: Fred J. Kern

Personal details
- Born: October 30, 1865 Chester, Illinois, U.S.
- Died: September 10, 1937 (aged 71) Alpena, Michigan, U.S.
- Resting place: Rock Creek Cemetery; Washington, D.C., U.S.
- Party: Republican
- Education: St. Louis Law School; Central Wesleyan College
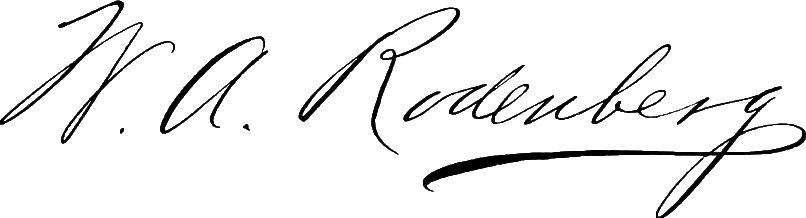
- Signature

William August Rodenberg (October 30, 1865 – September 10, 1937) was a U.S. representative from Illinois.

== Biography ==
Born near Chester, Illinois, the son of German immigrants, Rodenberg attended the public schools. He graduated from Central Wesleyan College in 1884. He taught school for seven years. He attended The St. Louis Law School. He was admitted to the bar in 1893 and commenced practice in East St. Louis, St. Clair County, Illinois. He served as delegate to the Republican National Conventions in 1896, 1908, 1916, and 1920.

Rodenberg was elected as a Republican to the Fifty-sixth Congress (March 4, 1899 – March 3, 1901). He was an unsuccessful candidate for reelection in 1900 to the Fifty-seventh Congress. He was appointed a member of the United States Civil Service Commission by President William McKinley March 25, 1901, and served until April 1, 1902, when he resigned. He resumed the practice of law in East St. Louis, also financially interested in various business enterprises.

Rodenberg was elected to the 58th and to the four succeeding Congresses (March 4, 1903 – March 3, 1913). He served as chairman of the Committee on Industrial Arts and Expositions (61st Congress). He was an unsuccessful candidate for reelection in 1912 to the 63rd Congress. Rodenberg was elected to the 64th and to the three succeeding Congresses (March 4, 1915 – March 3, 1923). On April 5, 1917, he voted with 49 other representatives against declaring war on Germany. He served as chairman of the Committee on Flood Control (66th and 67th Congresses). In November 1915, Rodenberg appeared as a dignitary on the train car along with the Liberty Bell as it passed through southern Illinois on its nationwide tour returning to Pennsylvania from the Panama–Pacific International Exposition in San Francisco. After that trip, the Liberty Bell returned to Pennsylvania and will not be moved again.

He practiced law in Washington, D.C. He died in Alpena, Michigan, while on a visit on September 10, 1937. He was interred in Rock Creek Cemetery, Washington, D.C.

U.S. House of Representatives
Preceded by Jehu Baker	Member of the U.S. House of Representatives from Illinois's 21st congressional district 1899–1901	Succeeded by Fred J. Kern
Preceded by George W. Smith	Member of the U.S. House of Representatives from Illinois's 22nd congressional district 1903–1913	Succeeded by William N. Baltz
Preceded by William N. Baltz	Member of the U.S. House of Representatives from Illinois's 22nd congressional district 1915–1923	Succeeded by Edward E. Miller
