= John A. Sterling =

American politician (1857–1918)

John Allen Sterling
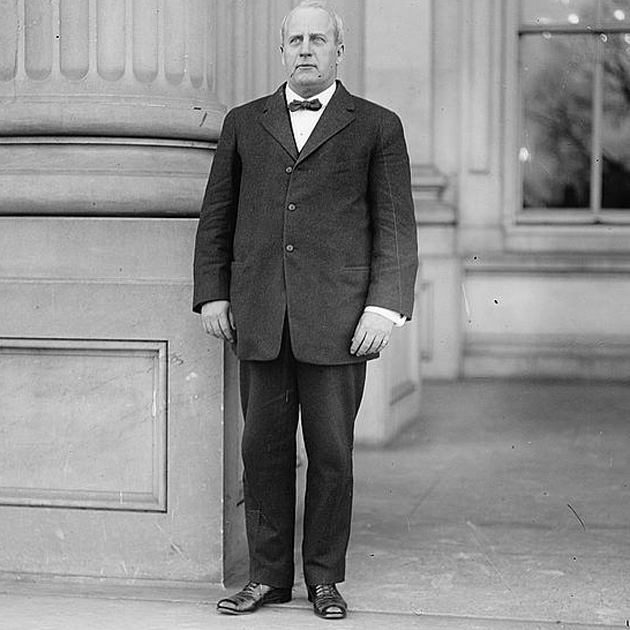
- Sterling c. 1913

Member of the U.S. House of Representatives from Illinois's 17th district
- In office March 4, 1903 – March 3, 1913
- Preceded by: Ben F. Caldwell
- Succeeded by: Louis Fitzhenry

Member of the U.S. House of Representatives from Illinois's 17th district
- In office March 4, 1915 – October 17, 1918
- Preceded by: Louis Fitzhenry
- Succeeded by: Frank L. Smith

Personal details
- Born: February 1, 1857 Le Roy, Illinois, U.S.
- Died: October 17, 1918 (aged 61) Pontiac, Illinois, U.S.
- Cause of death: Automobile accident
- Resting place: Park Hill Cemetery, Bloomington, Illinois, U.S.
- Party: Republican
- Relatives: Thomas Sterling (brother)

John Allen Sterling (February 1, 1857 – October 17, 1918) was a U.S. representative from Illinois, and brother of Thomas Sterling.

== Early life and education ==
Born to Charles Sterling (1821-1905) and Anna Kessler (1827-1908) near Le Roy in McLean County, Illinois, Sterling attended the public schools, and graduated from the Illinois Wesleyan University in Bloomington in 1881. He was superintendent of the public schools of Lexington, Illinois (now Lexington Community Unit School District 7) from 1881 to 1883.

== Career ==
He studied law, was admitted to the bar in December 1884, and commenced law practice in Bloomington. He was the state's attorney of McLean County from 1892 to 1896, and a member of the Republican state central committee from 1896 to 1898.

Sterling was elected as a Republican to the Fifty-eighth through Sixty-second Congresses (March 4, 1903–March 3, 1913). He was one of the managers appointed by the House of Representatives in 1912 to conduct the impeachment proceedings against Robert W. Archbald, judge of the United States Commerce Court. He lost re-election to the Sixty-third Congress, but was re-elected to the Sixty-fourth and Sixty-fifth Congresses and served from March 4, 1915 until his death near Pontiac, Illinois, as the result of an automobile accident on October 17, 1918.

== Death ==
He was interred in Park Hill Cemetery, Bloomington, Illinois.

== See also ==
- List of members of the United States Congress who died in office (1900–1949)

U.S. House of Representatives
Preceded by Ben F. Caldwell	Member of the U.S. House of Representatives from Illinois's 17th congressional district March 4, 1903 - March 3, 1913	Succeeded by Louis Fitzhenry
Preceded by Louis Fitzhenry	Member of the U.S. House of Representatives from Illinois's 17th congressional district March 4, 1915 - October 17, 1918	Succeeded by Frank L. Smith
