= Illinois's 22nd congressional district =

Former U.S. House district in Illinois

- Obsolete district
- Created: 1895
- Eliminated: 1990
- Years active: 1895–1993

The 22nd congressional district of Illinois was a congressional district for the United States House of Representatives in Illinois. It was eliminated as a result of the 1990 census. It was last represented by Glenn Poshard who was redistricted into the 19th district.

== List of members representing the district ==
Member	Party	Years	Cong ress	Electoral history
District created March 4, 1895
George W. Smith (Murphysboro)	Republican	March 4, 1895 – March 3, 1903	54th 55th 56th 57th	Redistricted from the 20th district and re-elected in 1894. Re-elected in 1896. Re-elected in 1898. Re-elected in 1900. Redistricted to the 25th district.
William A. Rodenberg (East St. Louis)	Republican	March 4, 1903 – March 3, 1913	58th 59th 60th 61st 62nd	Elected in 1902. Re-elected in 1904. Re-elected in 1906. Re-elected in 1908. Re-elected in 1910. Lost re-election.
William N. Baltz (Millstadt)	Democratic	March 4, 1913 – March 3, 1915	63rd	Elected in 1912. Lost re-election.
William A. Rodenberg (East St. Louis)	Republican	March 4, 1915 – March 3, 1923	64th 65th 66th 67th	Elected again in 1914. Re-elected in 1916. Re-elected in 1918. Re-elected in 1920. Retired.
Edward E. Miller (East St. Louis)	Republican	March 4, 1923 – March 3, 1925	68th	Elected in 1922. Retired.
Edward M. Irwin (Belleville)	Republican	March 4, 1925 – March 3, 1931	69th 70th 71st	Elected in 1924. Re-elected in 1926. Re-elected in 1928. Lost re-election.
Charles A. Karch (East St. Louis)	Democratic	March 4, 1931 – November 6, 1932	72nd	Elected in 1930. Died.
Vacant		November 6, 1932 – March 4, 1933	72nd	
Edwin M. Schaefer (Belleville)	Democratic	March 4, 1933 – January 3, 1943	73rd 74th 75th 76th 77th	Elected in 1932. Re-elected in 1934. Re-elected in 1936. Re-elected in 1938. Re-elected in 1940. Retired.
Calvin D. Johnson (Belleville)	Republican	January 3, 1943 – January 3, 1945	78th	Elected in 1942. Lost re-election.
Melvin Price (East St. Louis)	Democratic	January 3, 1945 – January 3, 1949	79th 80th	Elected in 1944. Re-elected in 1946. Redistricted to the 25th district.
Rolla C. McMillen (Decatur)	Republican	January 3, 1949 – January 3, 1951	81st	Redistricted from the 19th district and re-elected in 1948. Retired.
William L. Springer (Champaign)	Republican	January 3, 1951 – January 3, 1973	82nd 83rd 84th 85th 86th 87th 88th 89th 90th 91st 92nd	Elected in 1950. Re-elected in 1952. Re-elected in 1954. Re-elected in 1956. Re-elected in 1958. Re-elected in 1960. Re-elected in 1962. Re-elected in 1964. Re-elected in 1966. Re-elected in 1968. Re-elected in 1970. Redistricted to the 21st district.
George E. Shipley (Olney)	Democratic	January 3, 1973 – January 3, 1979	93rd 94th 95th	Redistricted from the 23rd district and re-elected in 1972. Re-elected in 1974. Re-elected in 1976. Retired.
Dan Crane (Danville)	Republican	January 3, 1979 – January 3, 1983	96th 97th	Elected in 1978. Re-elected in 1980. Redistricted to the 19th district.
Paul Simon (Carbondale)	Democratic	January 3, 1983 – January 3, 1985	98th	Redistricted from the 24th district and re-elected in 1982. Retired to run for U.S. Senator.
Kenneth J. Gray (West Frankfort)	Democratic	January 3, 1985 – January 3, 1989	99th 100th	Elected in 1984. Re-elected in 1986. Retired.
Glenn Poshard (Carterville)	Democratic	January 3, 1989 – January 3, 1993	101st 102nd	Elected in 1988. Re-elected in 1990. Redistricted to the 19th district.
District eliminated January 3, 1993
