= Illinois's 21st congressional district =

Former U.S. House district in Illinois

- Obsolete district
- Created: 1895
- Eliminated: 1990
- Years active: 1895-1993

The 21st congressional district of Illinois was a congressional district for the United States House of Representatives in Illinois. It was eliminated as a result of the 1990 census. It was last represented by Jerry Costello who was redistricted into the 12th district.

== List of members representing the district ==
Member	Party	Years	Cong ress	Electoral history
District created March 4, 1895
Everett J. Murphy (East St. Louis)	Republican	March 4, 1895 – March 3, 1897	54th	Elected in 1894. Lost re-election.
Jehu Baker (Belleville)	Democratic	March 4, 1897 – March 3, 1899	55th	Elected in 1896. Retired.
William A. Rodenberg (East St. Louis)	Republican	March 4, 1899 – March 3, 1901	56th	Elected in 1898. Lost re-election.
Fred J. Kern (Belleville)	Democratic	March 4, 1901 – March 3, 1903	57th	Elected in 1900. Redistricted to the 22nd district and lost re-election there.
Ben F. Caldwell (Chatham)	Democratic	March 4, 1903 – March 3, 1905	58th	Redistricted from the 17th district and re-elected in 1902. Lost re-election.
Zeno J. Rives (Litchfield)	Republican	March 4, 1905 – March 3, 1907	59th	Elected in 1904. Lost re-election.
Ben F. Caldwell (Chatham)	Democratic	March 4, 1907 – March 3, 1909	60th	Elected again in 1906. Retired.
James M. Graham (Springfield)	Democratic	March 4, 1909 – March 3, 1915	61st 62nd 63rd	Elected in 1908. Re-elected in 1910. Re-elected in 1912. Lost re-election.
Loren E. Wheeler (Springfield)	Republican	March 4, 1915 – March 3, 1923	64th 65th 66th 67th	Elected in 1914. Re-elected in 1916. Re-elected in 1918. Re-elected in 1920. Lost re-election.
J. Earl Major (Hillsboro)	Democratic	March 4, 1923 – March 3, 1925	68th	Elected in 1922. Lost re-election.
Loren E. Wheeler (Springfield)	Republican	March 4, 1925 – March 3, 1927	69th	Elected again in 1924. Lost re-election.
J. Earl Major (Hillsboro)	Democratic	March 4, 1927 – March 3, 1929	70th	Elected again in 1926. Lost re-election.
Frank M. Ramey (Hillsboro)	Republican	March 4, 1929 – March 3, 1931	71st	Elected in 1928. Retired.
J. Earl Major (Hillsboro)	Democratic	March 4, 1931 – October 6, 1933	72nd 73rd	Elected again in 1930. Re-elected in 1932. Resigned after becoming judge of the US District Court for the Southern District of Illinois.
Vacant		October 6, 1933 – January 3, 1935	73rd	
Harry H. Mason (Pawnee)	Democratic	January 3, 1935 – January 3, 1937	74th	Elected in 1934. Retired.
Frank W. Fries (Carlinville)	Democratic	January 3, 1937 – January 3, 1941	75th 76th	Elected in 1936. Re-elected in 1938. Lost re-election.
George E. Howell (Springfield)	Republican	January 3, 1941 – October 5, 1947	77th 78th 79th 80th	Elected in 1940. Re-elected in 1942. Re-elected in 1944. Re-elected in 1946. Resigned after becoming judge of the US Court of Claims.
Vacant		October 5, 1947 – January 3, 1949	80th	
Peter F. Mack Jr. (Carlinville)	Democratic	January 3, 1949 – January 3, 1963	81st 82nd 83rd 84th 85th 86th 87th	Elected in 1948. Re-elected in 1950. Re-elected in 1952. Re-elected in 1954. Re-elected in 1956. Re-elected in 1958. Re-elected in 1960. Redistricted to the 20th district and lost re-election there.
Kenneth J. Gray (West Frankfort)	Democratic	January 3, 1963 – January 3, 1973	88th 89th 90th 91st 92nd	Redistricted from the 25th district and re-elected in 1962. Re-elected in 1964. Re-elected in 1966. Re-elected in 1968. Re-elected in 1970. Redistricted to the 24th district.
Edward R. Madigan (Lincoln)	Republican	January 3, 1973 – January 3, 1983	93rd 94th 95th 96th 97th	Elected in 1972. Re-elected in 1974; Re-elected in 1976. Re-elected in 1978. Re-elected in 1980. Redistricted to the 15th district.
Melvin Price (East St. Louis)	Democratic	January 3, 1983 – April 22, 1988	98th 99th 100th	Redistricted from the 23rd district and re-elected in 1982. Re-elected in 1984. Re-elected in 1986. Died.
Vacant		April 22, 1988 – August 9, 1988	100th	
Jerry Costello (Belleville)	Democratic	August 9, 1988 – January 3, 1993	100th 101st 102nd	Elected to finish Price's term. Re-elected in 1988. Re-elected in 1990. Redistricted to the 12th district.
District eliminated January 3, 1993
