= Edwin M. Schaefer =

American politician

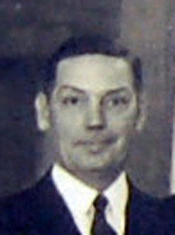

Member of the U.S. House of Representatives from Illinois's 22nd district
- In office March 4, 1933 – January 3, 1943
- Preceded by: Charles A. Karch
- Succeeded by: Calvin D. Johnson

Personal details
- Born: May 14, 1887 Belleville, Illinois, U.S.
- Died: November 8, 1950 (aged 63) St. Louis, Missouri, U.S.
- Party: Democratic

Edwin Martin Schaefer (May 14, 1887 – November 8, 1950) was a U.S. representative from Illinois.

Born in Belleville, St. Clair County, Illinois, Schaefer attended the public schools, Western Military Academy, Alton, Illinois, and the University of Illinois. He graduated from Washington University in St. Louis, Missouri, in 1910. Chemical engineer with Morris & Co., packers, East St. Louis, Illinois from 1913 to 1916, assistant general superintendent 1916–1918, and general superintendent 1919–1928. He served as assistant recorder of deeds of St. Clair County, Illinois from 1928 to 1930. He was the county treasurer of St. Clair County, Illinois from 1930 to 1932. He served as delegate to the Democratic State conventions in 1928, 1932, and 1936.

Schaefer was elected as a Democrat to the Seventy-third and to the four succeeding Congresses (March 4, 1933 – January 3, 1943). He was not a candidate for renomination in 1942. He served as member of the board of directors of Griesediech-Western Brewery Co., Belleville, Illinois, at the time of his death. He died in St. Louis, Missouri, November 8, 1950. He was interred in Walnut Hill Cemetery, Belleville, Illinois.

U.S. House of Representatives
Preceded by Charles A. Karch	Member of the U.S. House of Representatives from Illinois's 22nd congressional district 1933-1943	Succeeded by Calvin D. Johnson
