= Zeno J. Rives =

American politician (1874–1939)

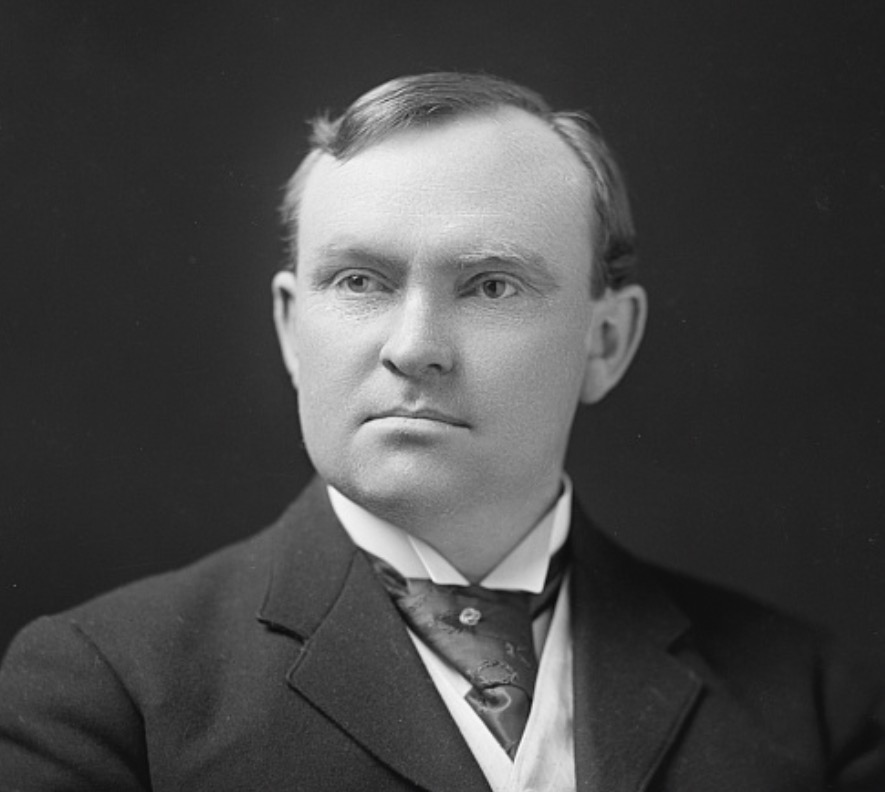
- Portrait of Rives by Charles Milton Bell, taken between March 1905 and August 1906

Member of the U.S. House of Representatives from Illinois's 21st district
- In office March 4, 1905 – March 3, 1907
- Preceded by: Ben F. Caldwell
- Succeeded by: Ben F. Caldwell

Personal details
- Born: Zeno John Rives; February 22, 1874 Greenfield, Indiana, US
- Died: September 2, 1939 (aged 65) Decatur, Illinois, US
- Resting place: Graceland Cemetery
- Party: Republican
- Occupation: Politician, lawyer

Zeno John Rives (February 22, 1874 – September 2, 1939) was an American politician and lawyer. A Republican, he was a member of the United States House of Representatives from Illinois.

== Biography ==
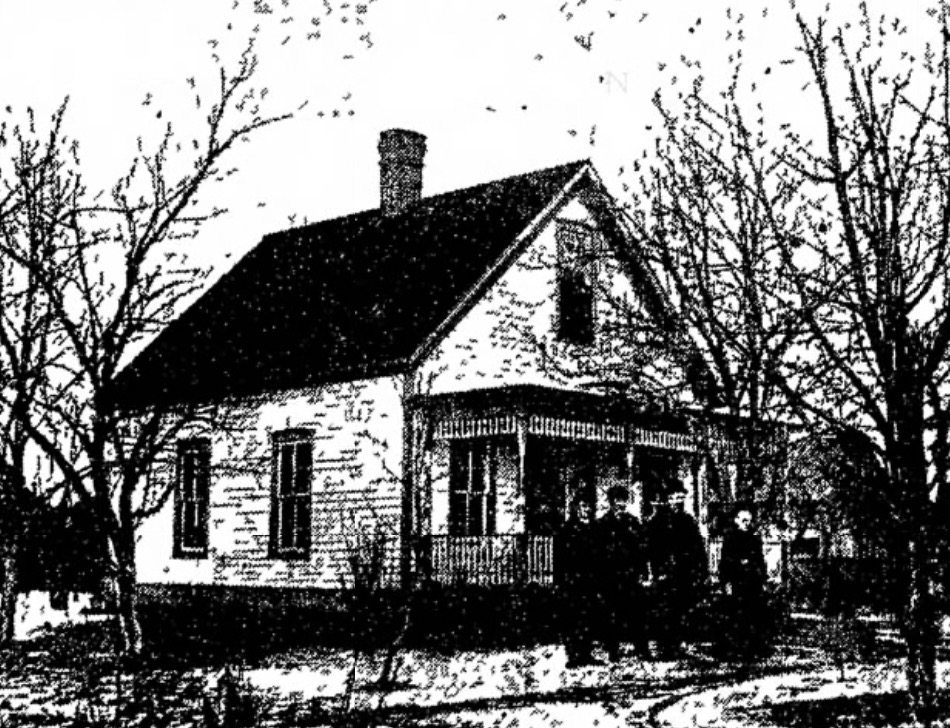
Rives' house in Litchfield, with his family stood out front (1904)

Rives was born on February 22, 1874, in Greenfield, Indiana, the son of Alfred J. Rives and Lettice S. (née Heath) Rives. His father worked as a ditcher and later as a cleaner. In 1880, they moved to Litchfield, Illinois, where he was educated.

After schooling, Rives worked odd jobs. He read law under Amos Oliver, and on October 12, 1901, was admitted to the bar, after which he began practicing law in Litchfield. Until 1904, he was partnered with P. A. Willhite. In June or August 1903, he was made city clerk. He was poor, in 1904 being reported of having a net worth of $100 and a monthly income of $50.

Rives was a Republican. He was a member of the United States House of Representatives, from March 4, 1905, to March 3, 1907, representing Illinois's 21st district. He lost the candidacy for the following election. He spent $25 on his campaign. He also bet $100 that he would lose the election, which had to repay after winning. Elected to Congress at a young age, he was often scrutinized by the railroad employees he encountered on his journey to Washington, D.C. due to his appearance; he stood at 5 ft 7 in (1.70 m) and weighed 180 pounds (82 kg). Politically, he was conservative.

After serving in Congress, Rives returned to practicing law in Litchfield. From 1912 to 1916, he was the city's postmaster. In 1919, he moved to Decatur, where he practiced and managed real estate. He retired in 1933 due to illness. He was Presbyterian, as well as a member of the Knights of Pythias. He died on September 2, 1939, aged 65, in Decatur, and was buried at Graceland Cemetery.

U.S. House of Representatives
| Preceded by Ben F. Caldwell | Member of the U.S. House of Representatives from Illinois's 21st congressional district 1905–1907 | Succeeded by Ben F. Caldwell |
