= Fred J. Kern =

American politician

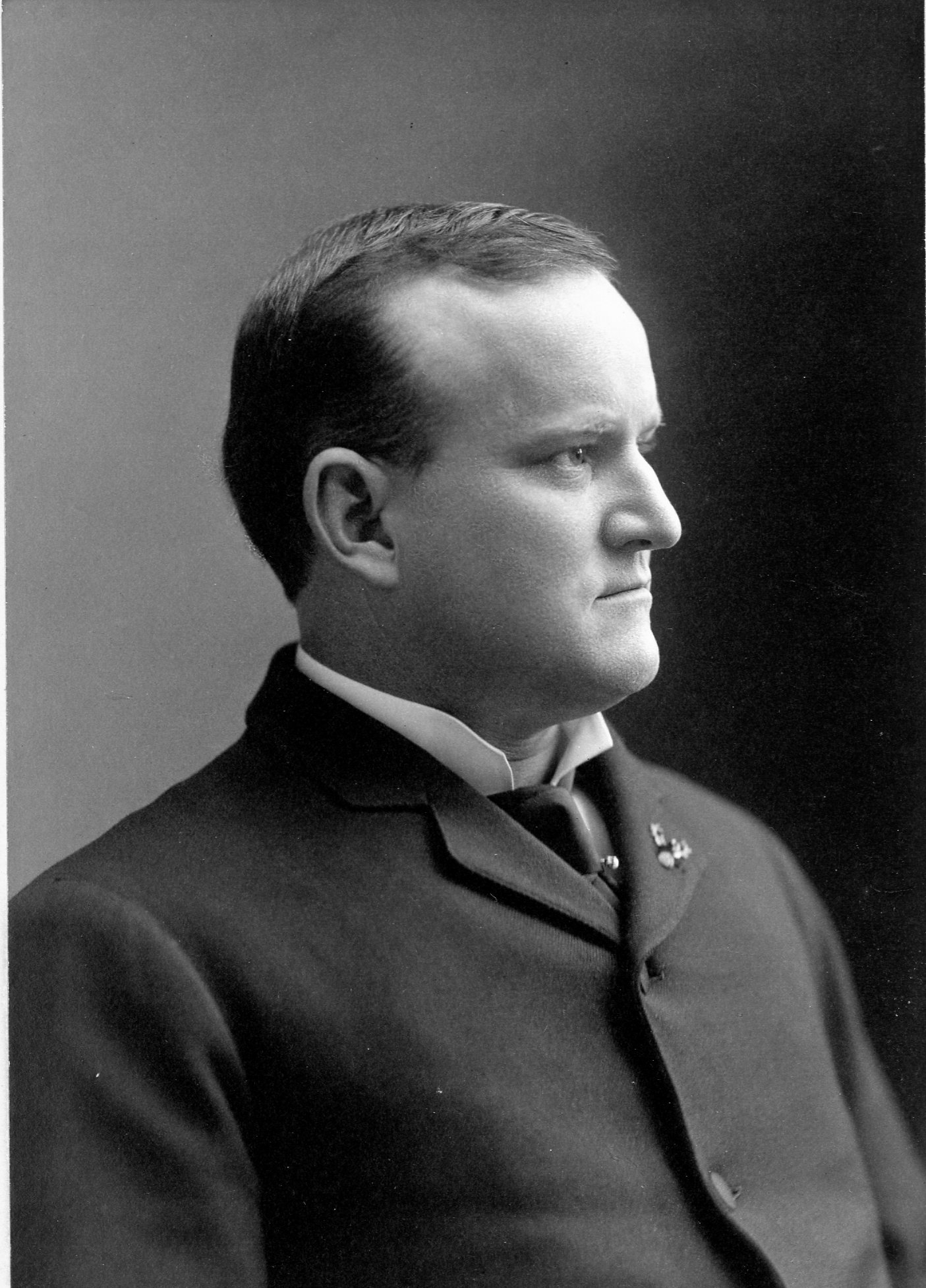

Member of the U.S. House of Representatives from Illinois's 21st district
- In office March 4, 1901 – March 3, 1903
- Preceded by: William A. Rodenberg
- Succeeded by: Ben F. Caldwell

Personal details
- Born: September 2, 1864 Millstadt, Illinois
- Died: November 9, 1931 (aged 67) Belleville, Illinois
- Party: Democratic

Frederick John Kern (September 2, 1864 – November 9, 1931) was a U.S. Representative from Illinois.

== Early life ==
Frederick John Kern was born on the family homestead farm near Millstadt, St. Clair County, Illinois, the son and grandson of German immigrants. Kern was educated in the Millstadt public and parochial schools, and attended Illinois State Normal University in Normal, Illinois during the 1885–86 and 1887-88 academic years. In 1884, Kern traveled to Gurdon, Arkansas, where he worked for a year in various lumber camps and mills. While in Arkansas, Kern lost his left hand in a hunting accident, and subsequently returned to Millstadt, IL where, after completing his education at Illinois State, he taught at various times in the Bohleyville, Hoepfinger, and Englemann Township schools. In 1890, Kern entered journalism as editor of the East St. Louis (Illinois) Gazette, and in 1891, he and partner Fred L. Kraft purchased the Belleville News-Democrat from the Southern Illinois Publishing Company. In 1892 his partner withdrew, and Kern served as Publisher, Editor and Sole owner of the newspaper until his death.

== Political career ==
In 1892, Kern served as Chief Enrolling and Engrossing Clerk of the Illinois State Senate. After an unsuccessful run for the United States 56th Congress in 1898, Kern was elected as a Democrat to the 57th United States Congress, and served one term in 1901-03. Defeated for re-election in 1902, Kern was elected Mayor of Belleville, IL in 1903, where he served 5 terms during 1903-13. In 1913, Kern was appointed by Illinois Governor Edward Dunne to the position of President of the Illinois State Board of Administration, where he served through 1918. He served as delegate to the Democratic National Conventions in 1904, 1908, and 1912.

== Later life ==
After 1918, Kern occupied no public office and devoted all his time to his newspaper work. Married on July 23, 1893 to Alma Fredericka Eidmann Of Mascoutah, IL, the couple had three sons, Alfred E., Robert L., and Richard P. Fred J. Kern died in Belleville, Illinois, on November 9, 1931, and was interred in Walnut Hill Cemetery.

U.S. House of Representatives
Preceded by William A. Rodenberg	Member of the U.S. House of Representatives from Illinois's 21st congressional district 1901–1903	Succeeded by Ben F. Caldwell
