= List of sketches of notable people by Marguerite Martyn =

This is a list of sketches of notable people, or of their close relatives, drawn by Marguerite Martyn (American journalist, 1878–1948) and published in the St. Louis Post-Dispatch.

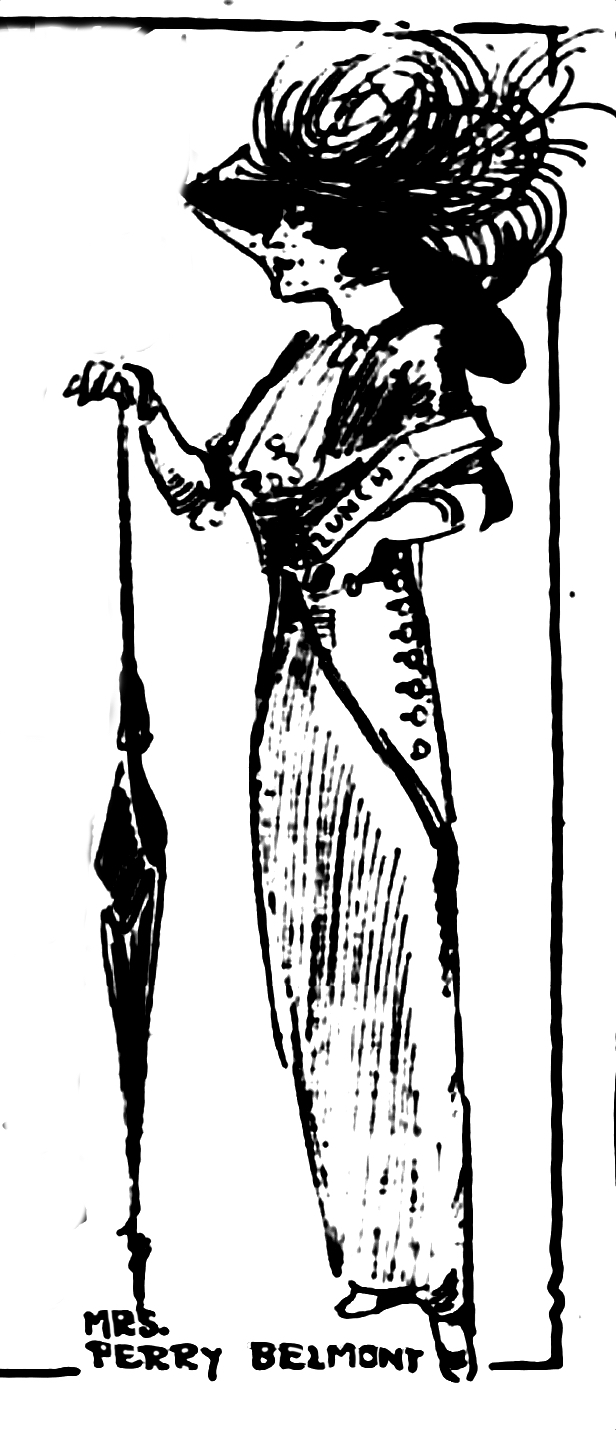
Jessie Ann Robbins Belmont, 1912

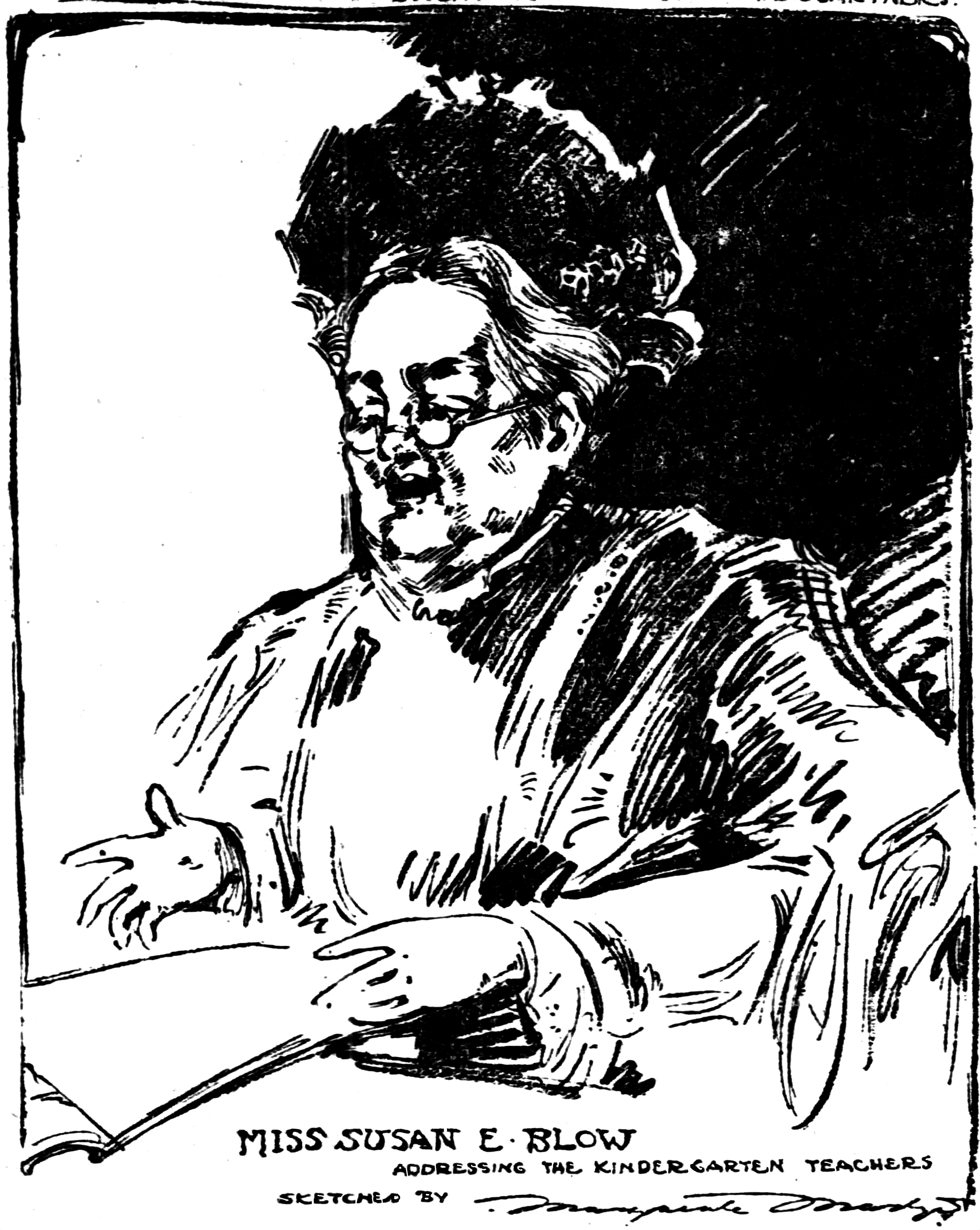
Susan E. Blow, 1909

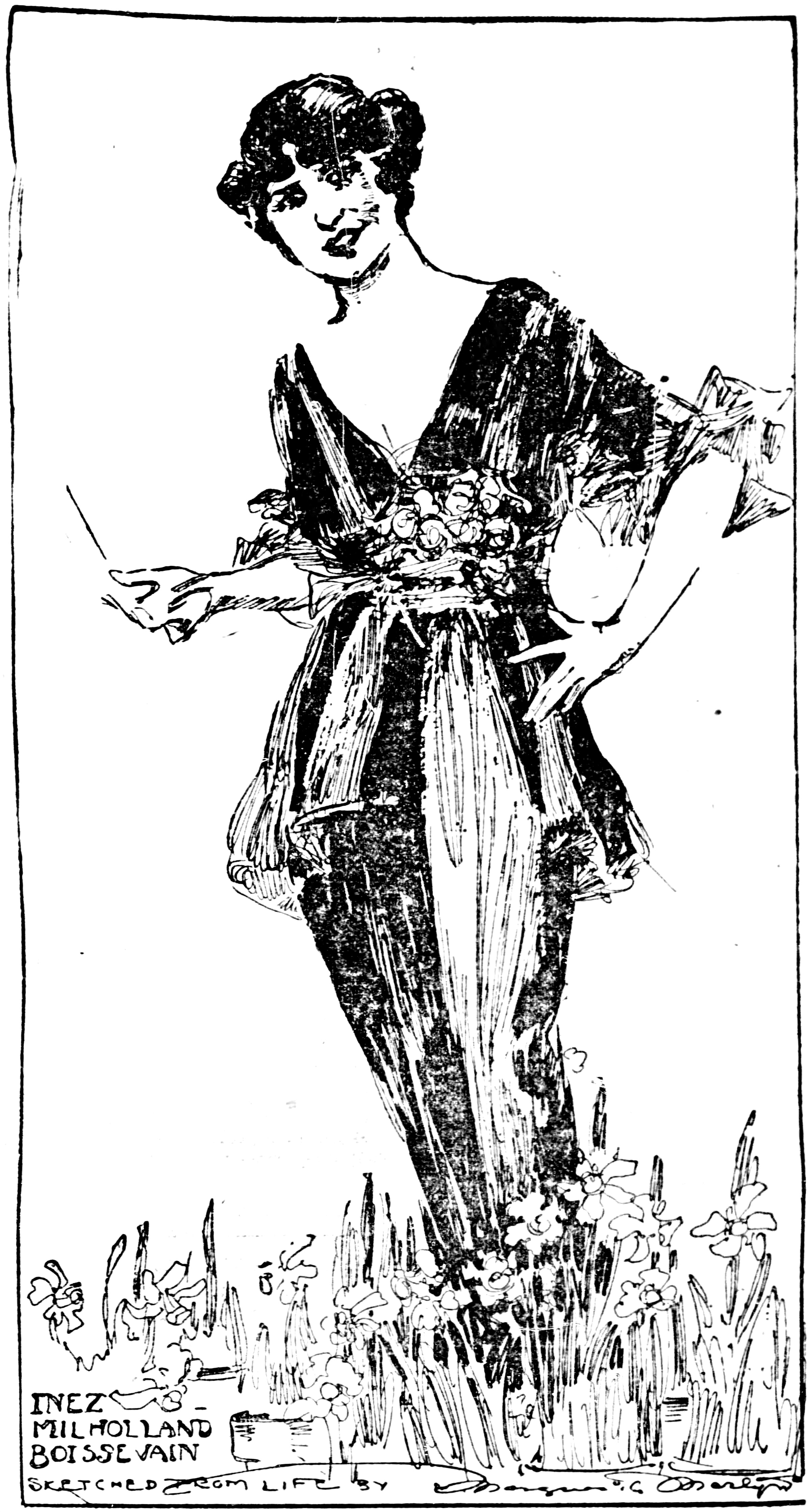
Inez Milholland Boissevain, 1914

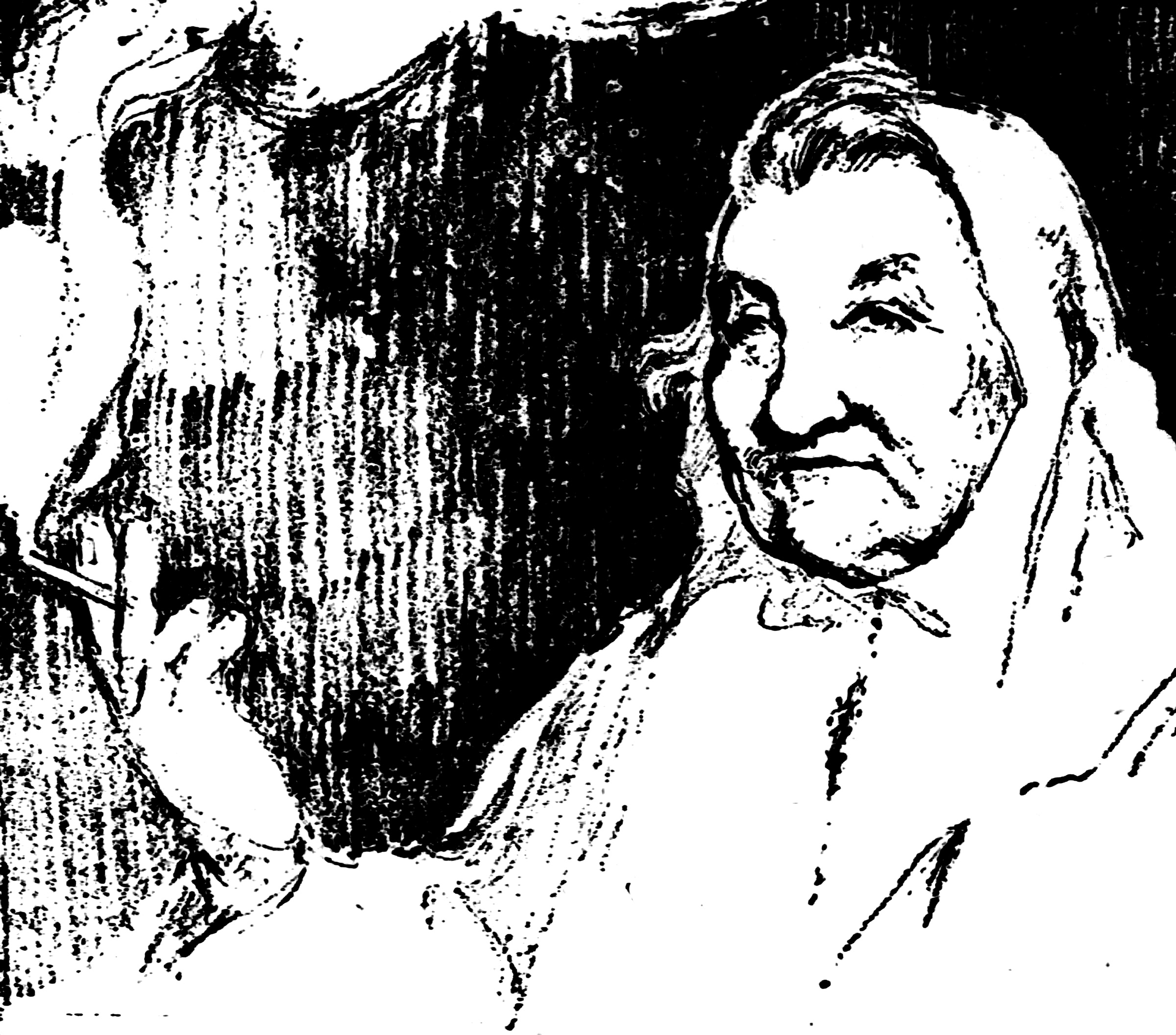
Catherine Breshkovsky, 1919

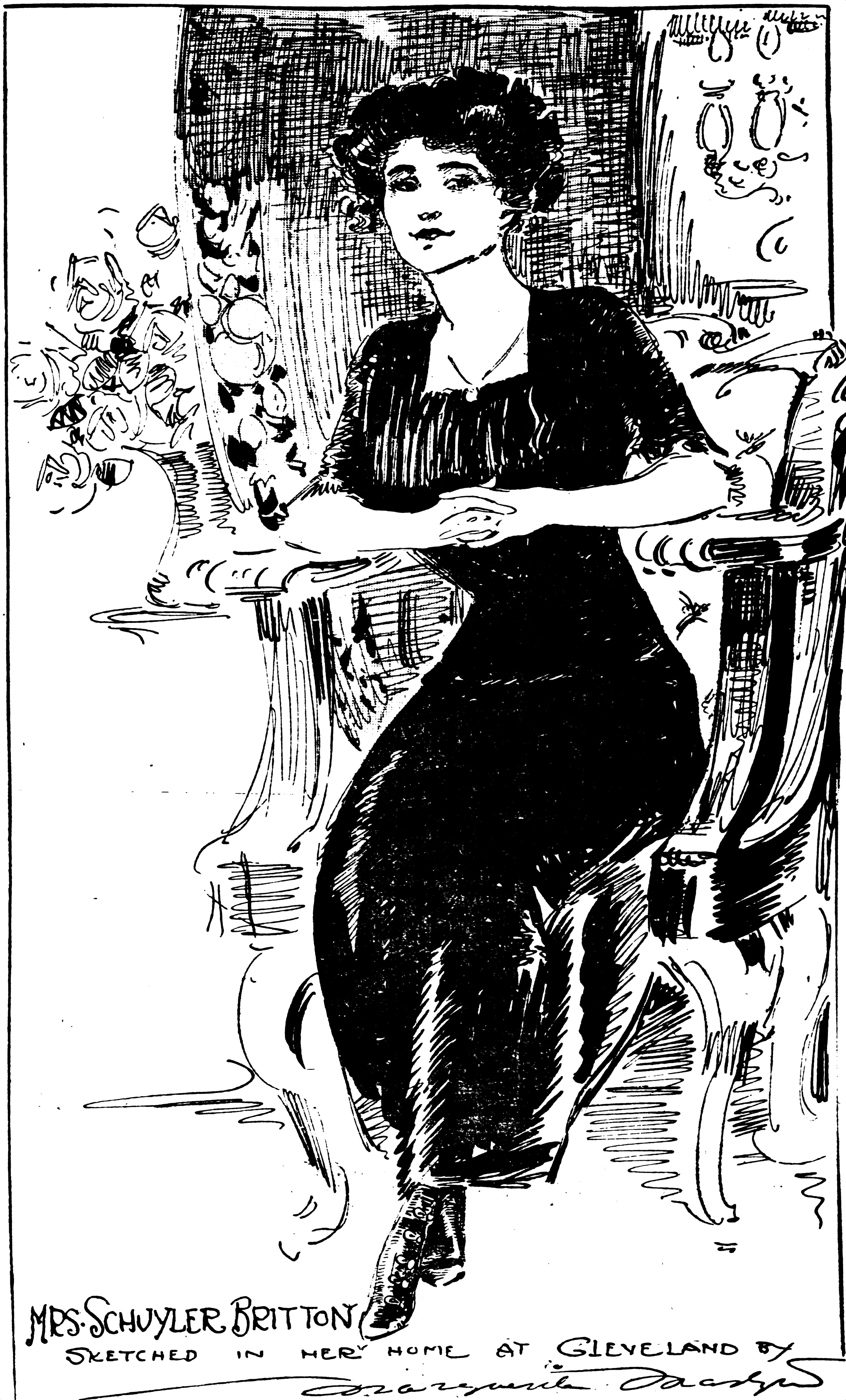
Helene Hathaway Robison Britton, 1911

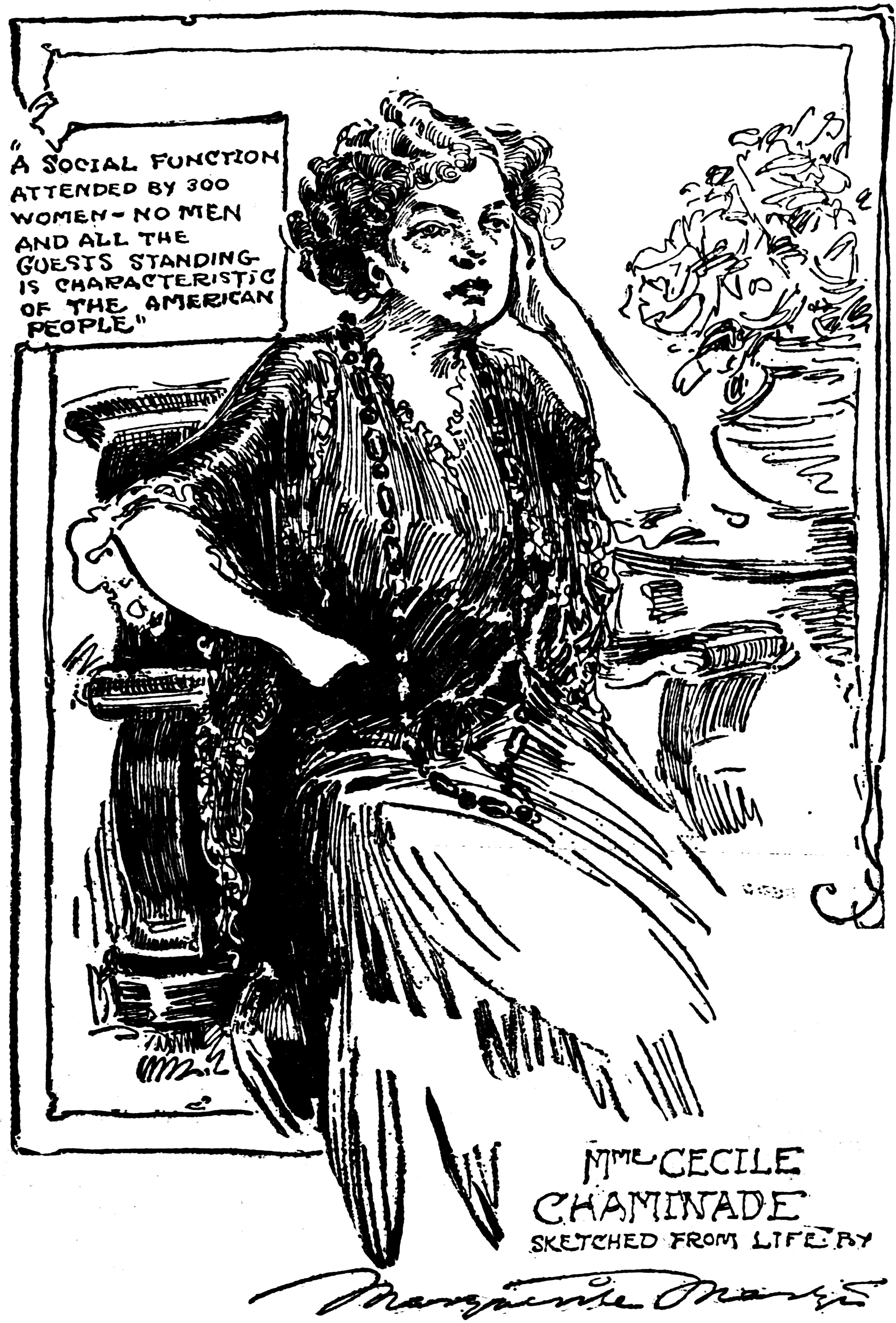
Cécile Chaminade, 1908

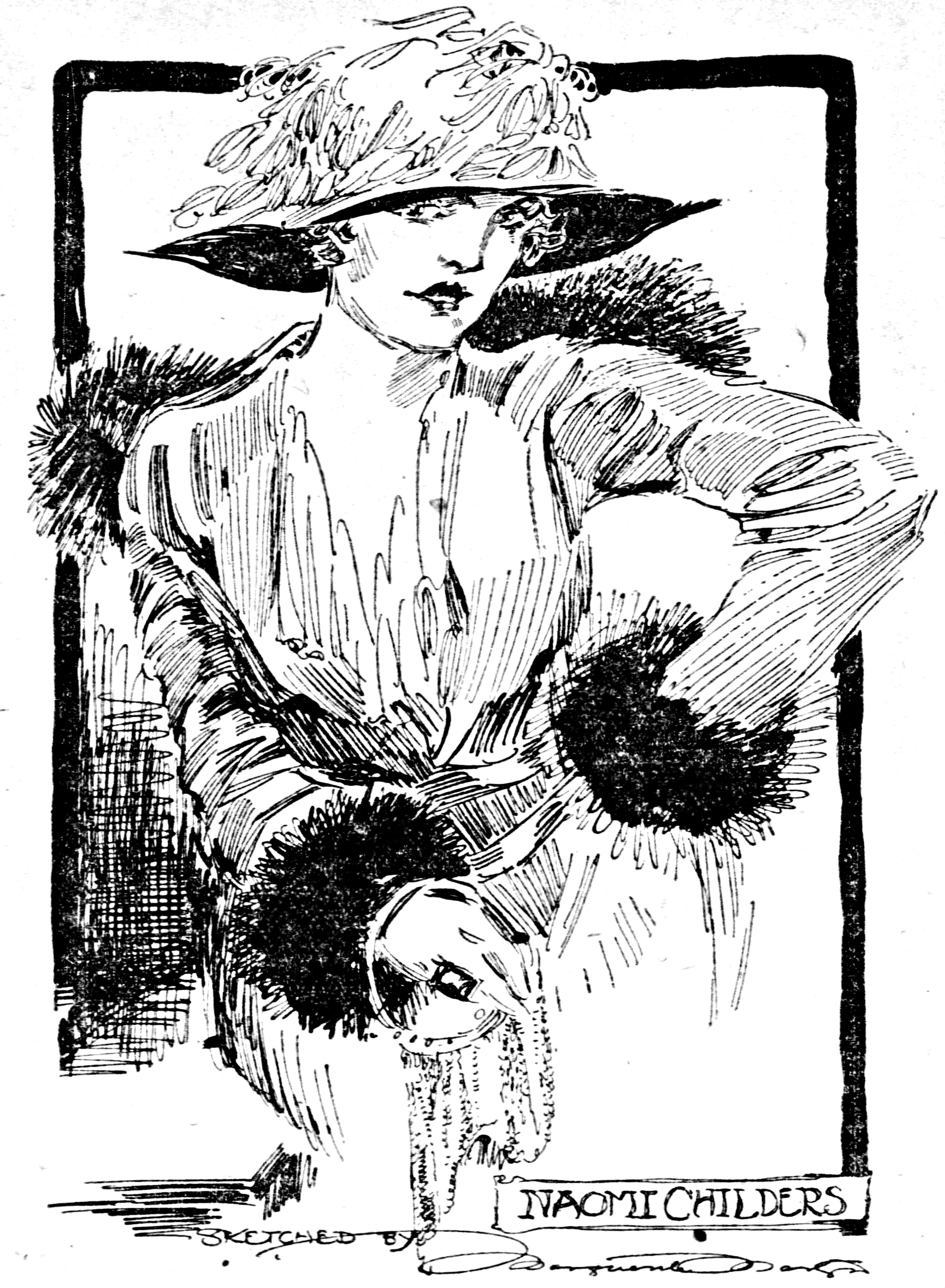
Naomi Childers, 1916

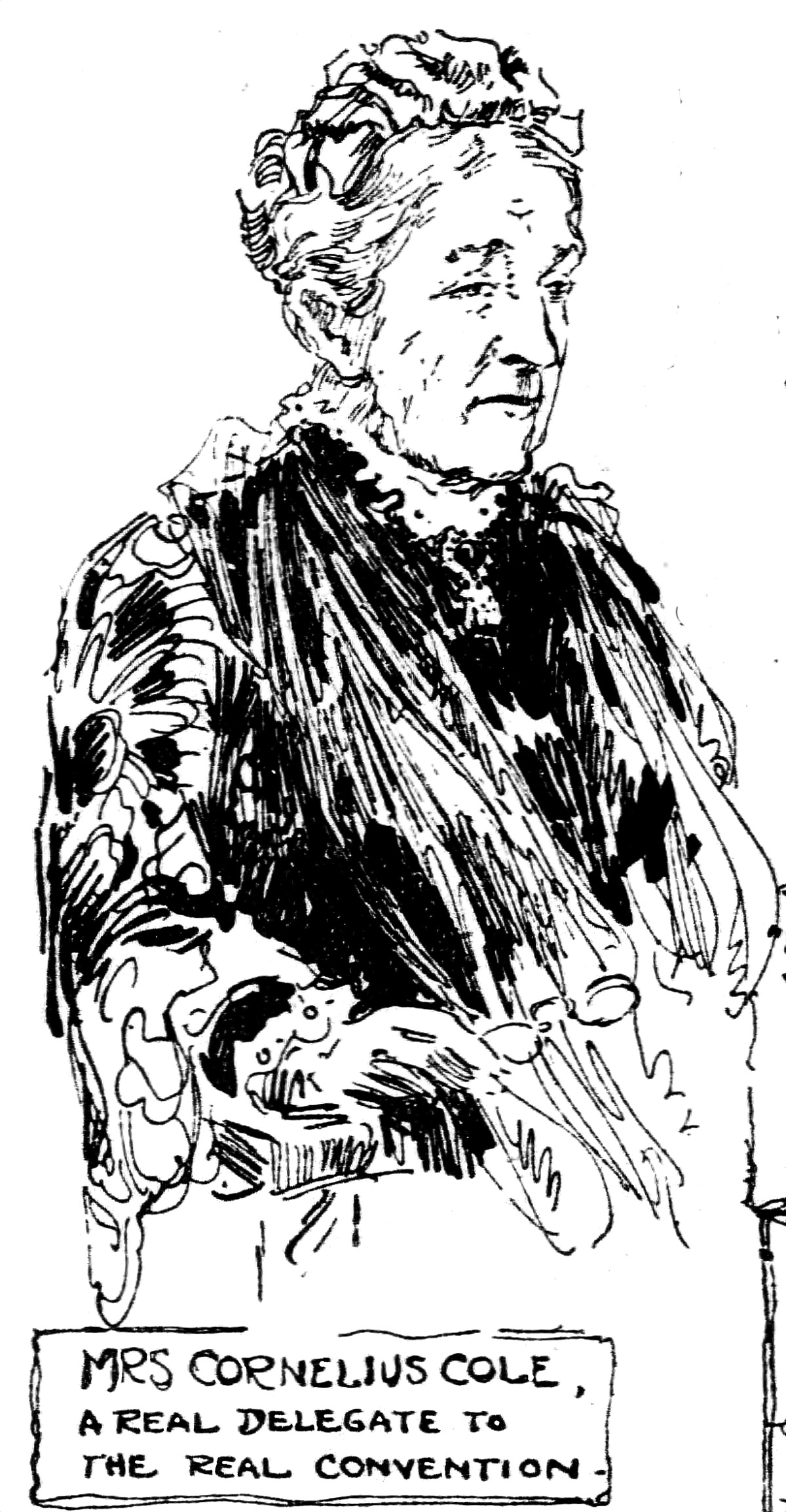
Mrs. Cornelius Cole, 1916

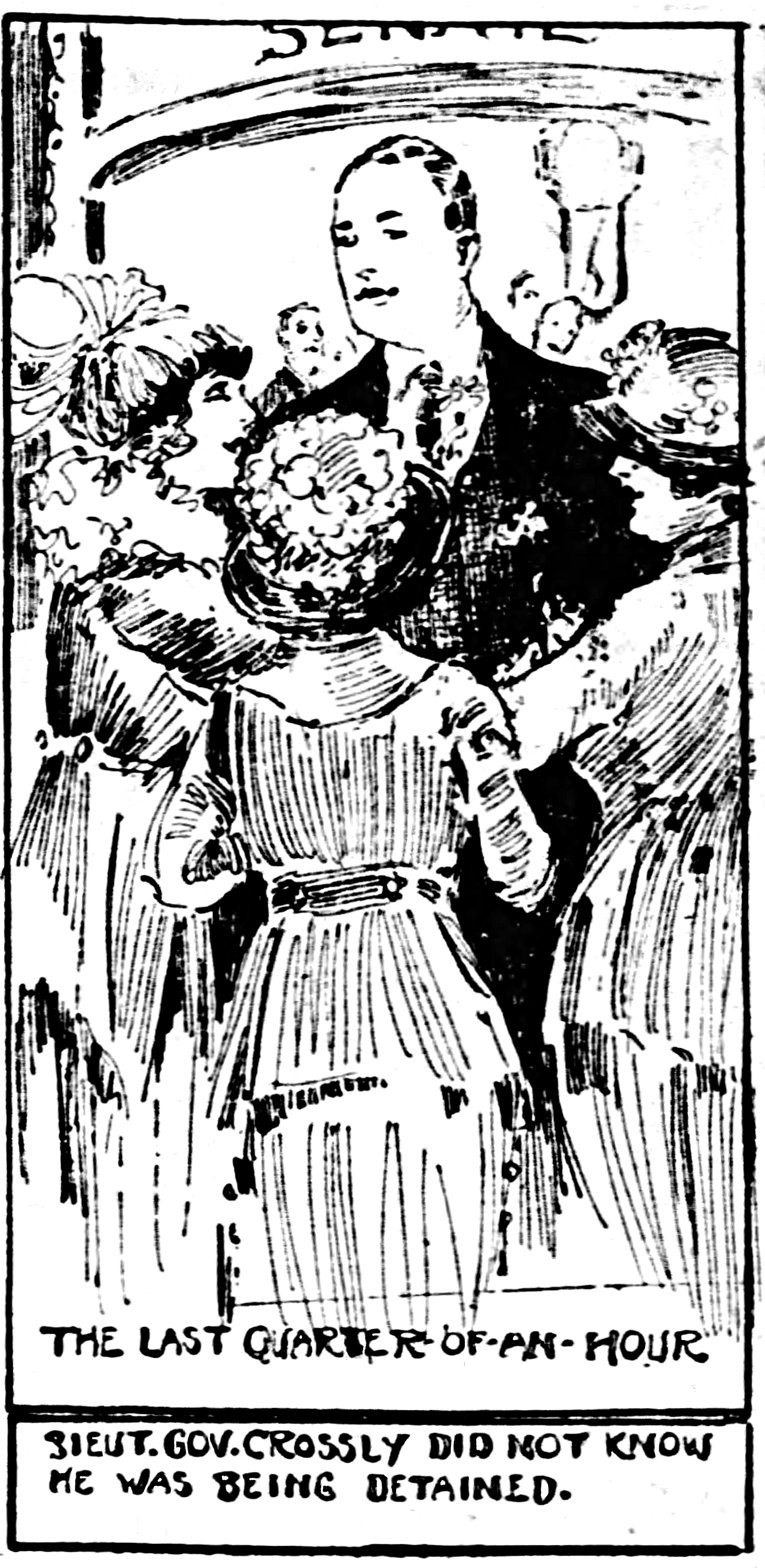
Wallace Crossley, 1919

Thamara de Swirsky, 1911

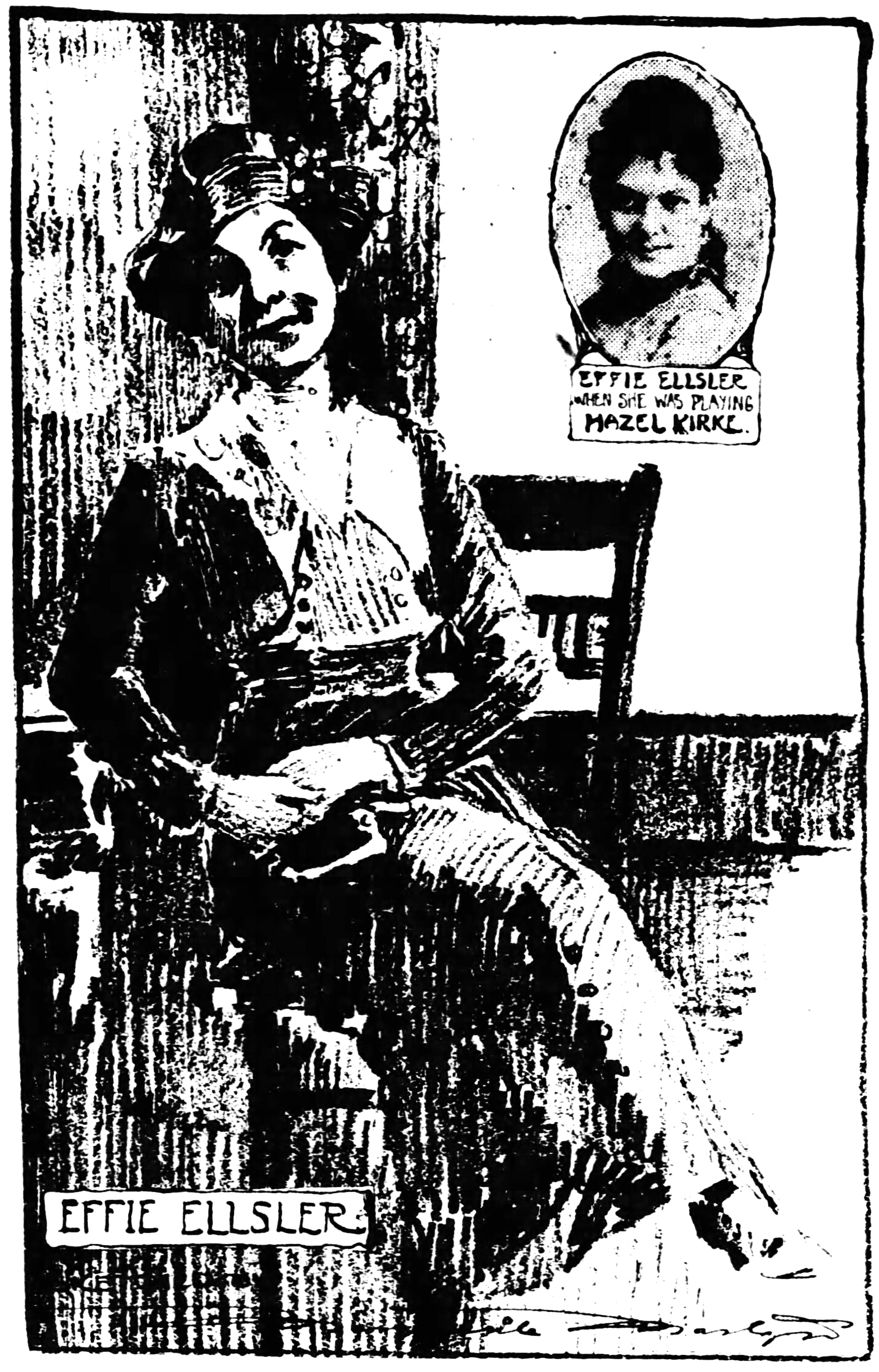
Effie Ellsler, 1919

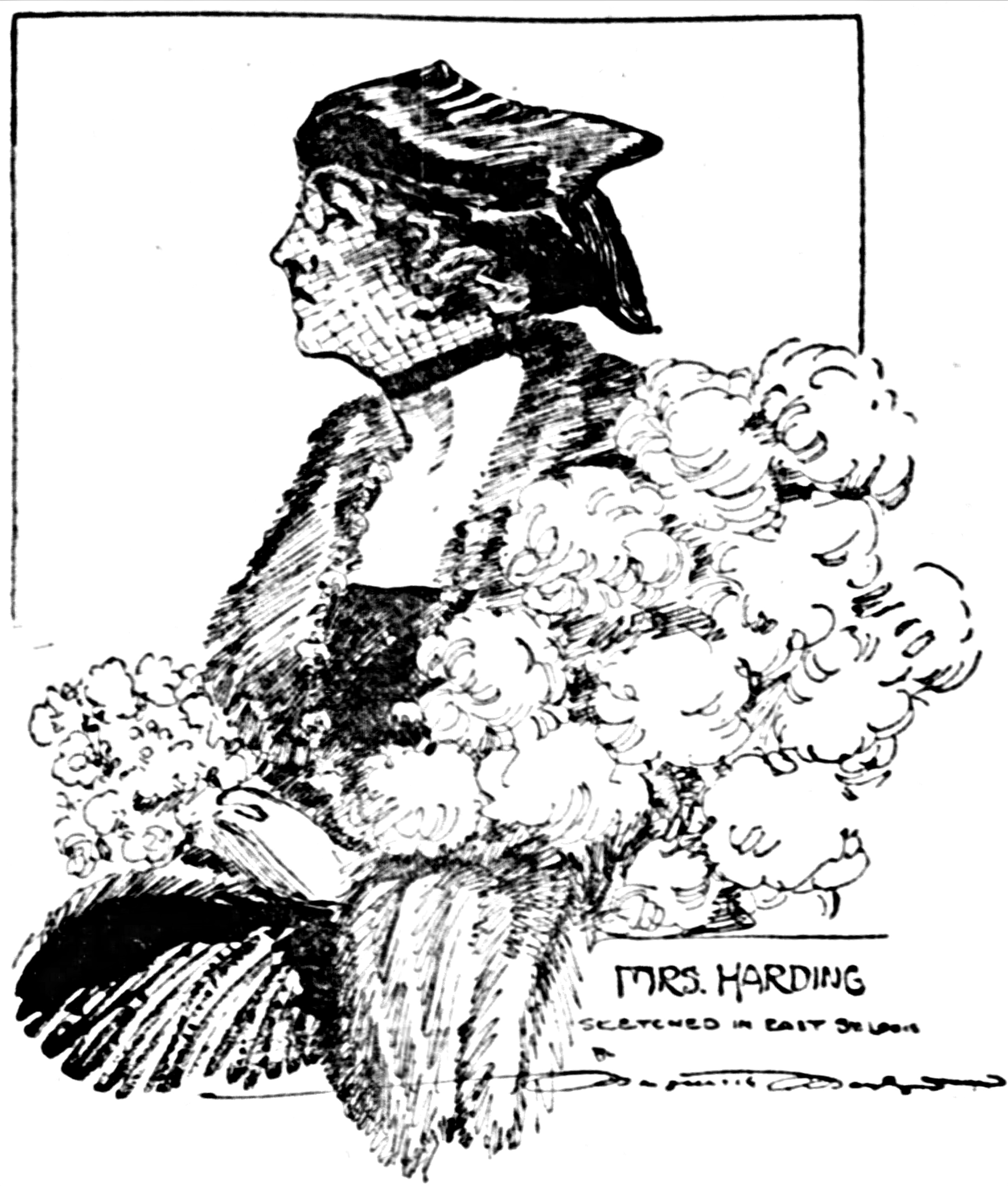
Florence Harding, 1920

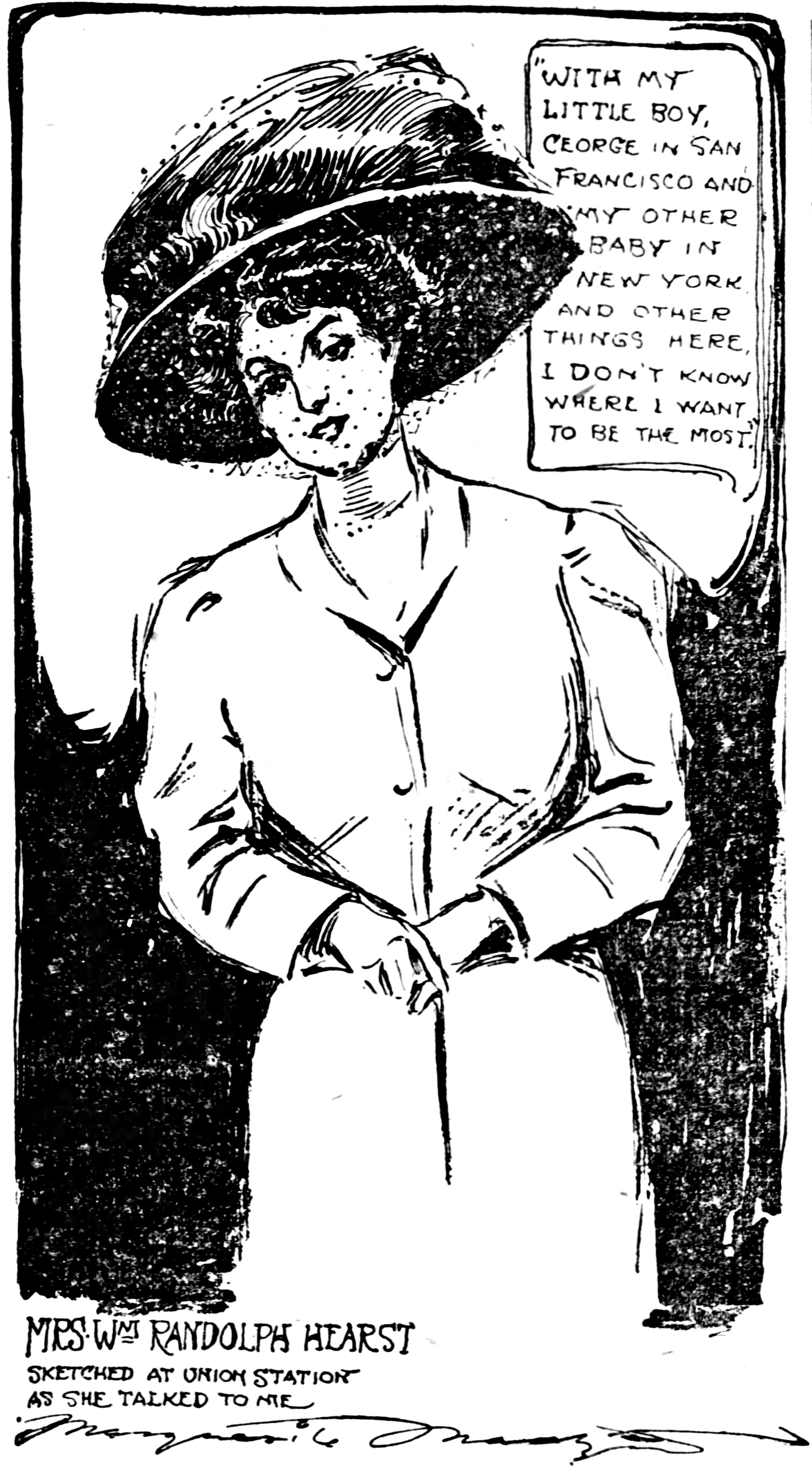
Millicent Hearst, 1908

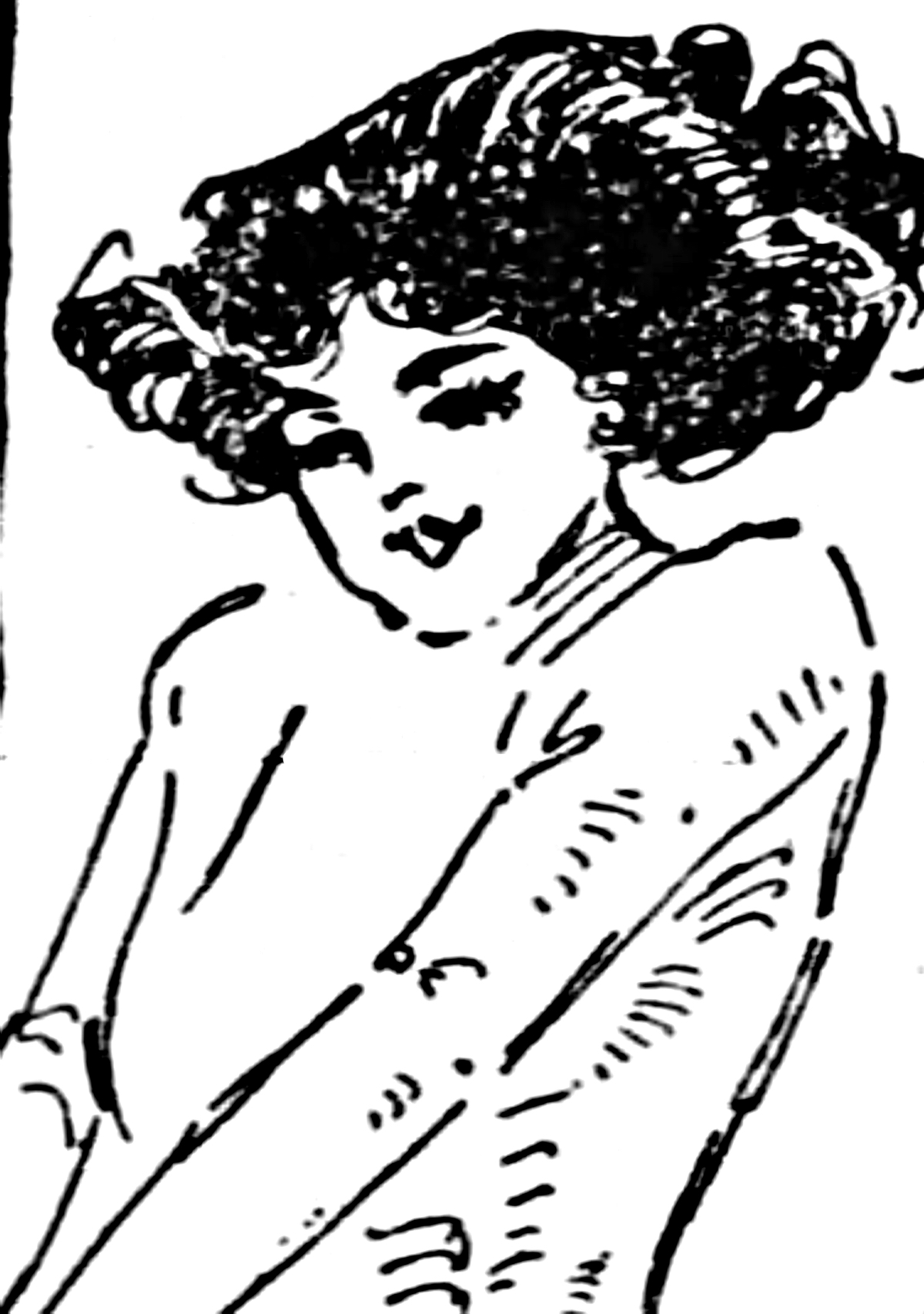
Fannie Hurst, 1909

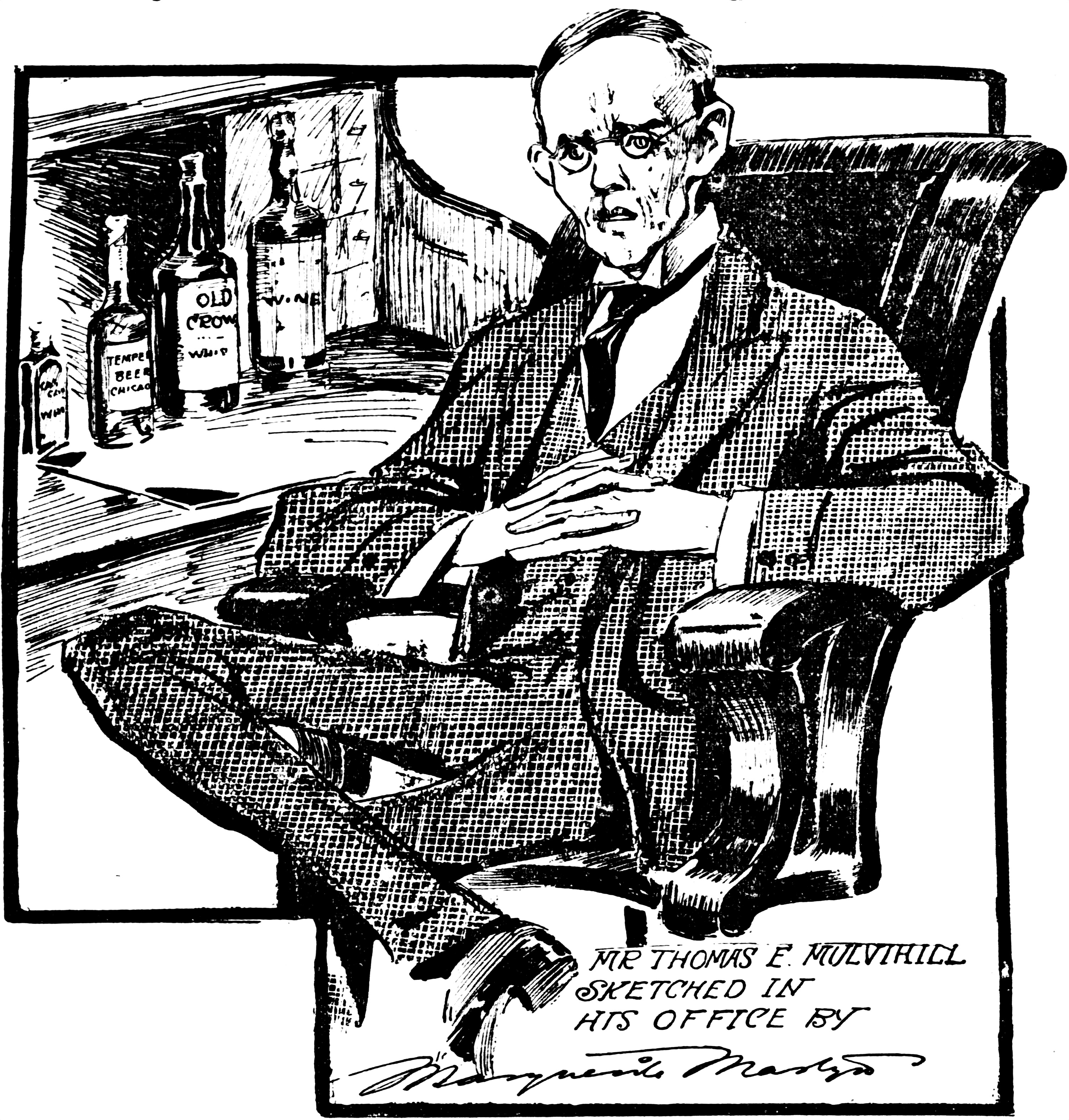
Thomas E. Mulvihill Sr., 1908

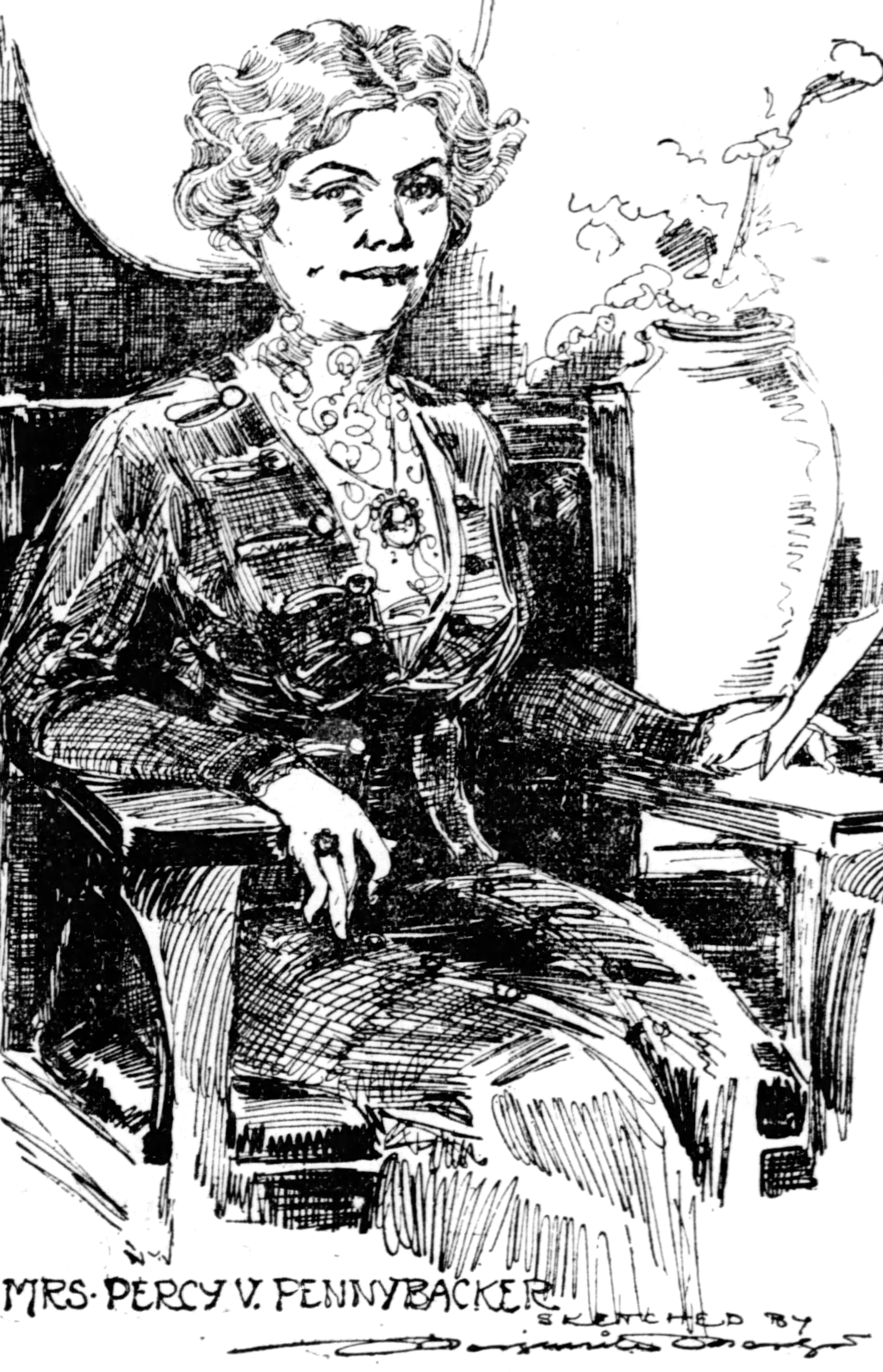
Anna Pennybacker, 1913

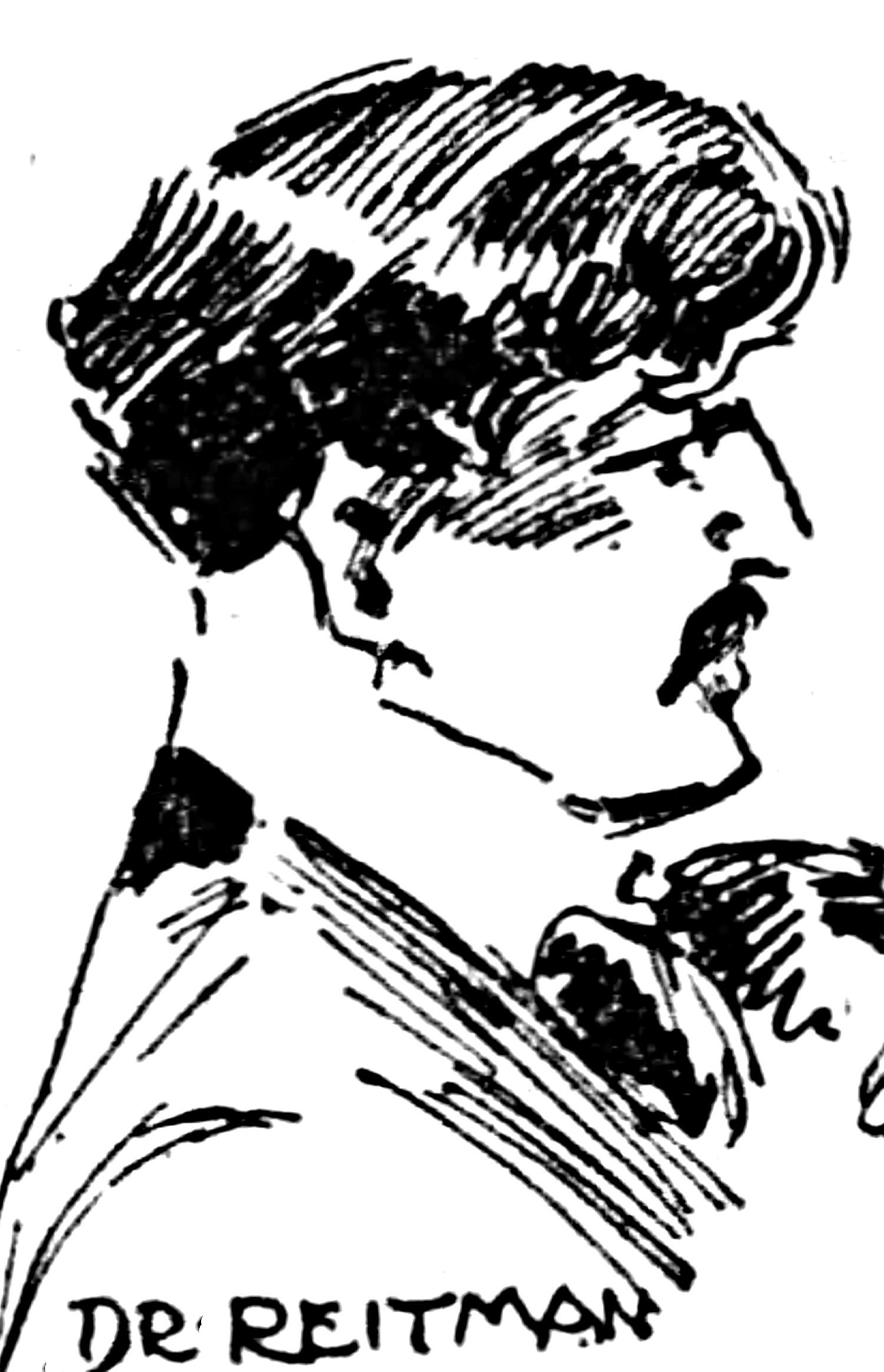
Ben Reitman, 1910

Finley Johnson Shepard, 1912

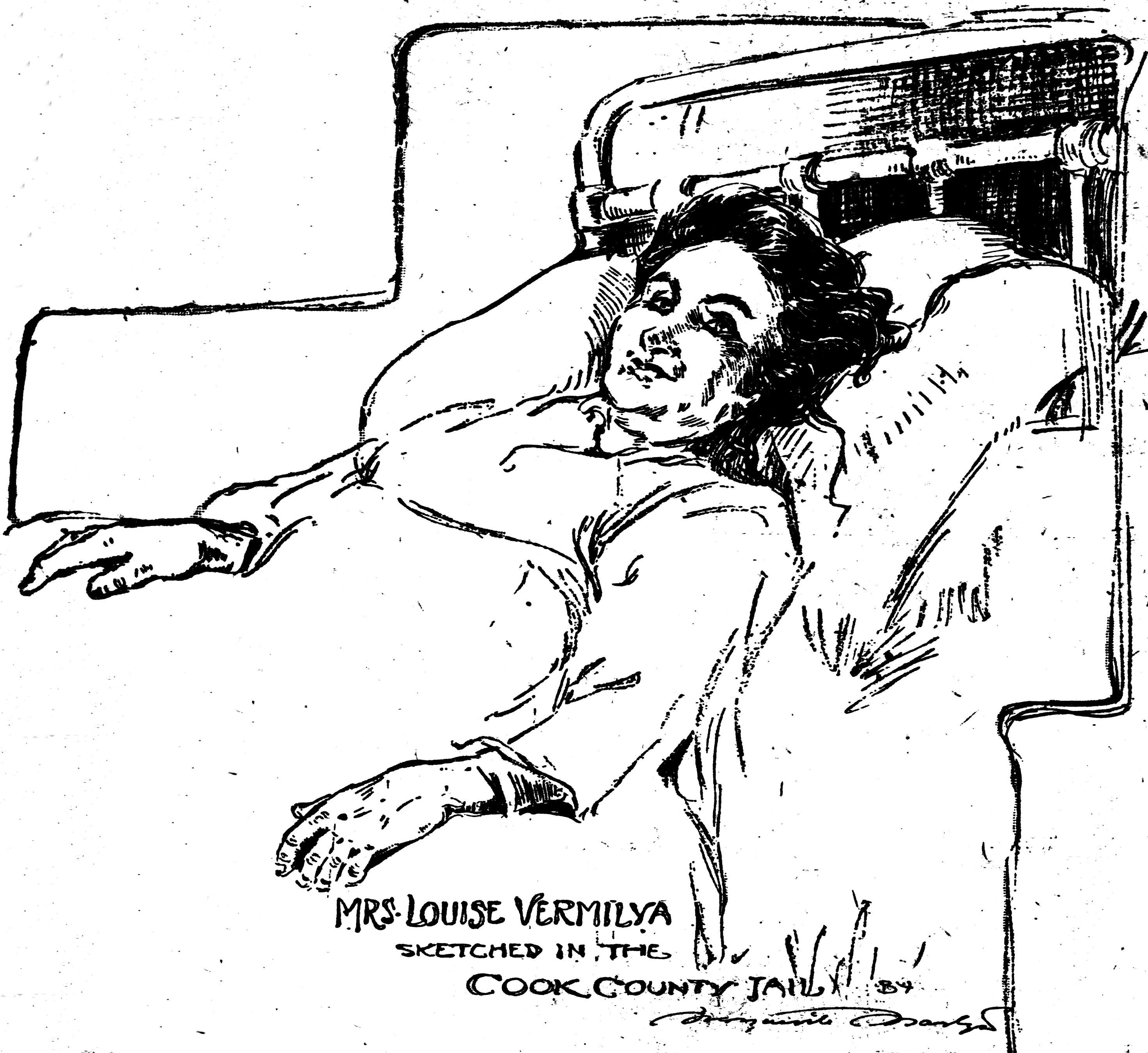
Louise Vermilya, 1911

== A ==
- Jane Addams, pioneer settlement worker
- Judge Glendy B. Arnold of the divorce court
- Carrie Thomas Alexander-Bahrenberg, University of Illinois trustee
- Helen Dinsmore Huntington Astor, Republican Party activist
- Nancy Astor, Viscountess Astor, British politician
- Rachel Foster Avery, pioneer suffragist

== B ==
- Roger Nash Baldwin, a founder of the American Civil Liberties Union
- Illinois Congressman-elect William N. Baltz and his daughters
- Bertha Barr, delegate to 1936 Republican National Convention
- Ethel Barrymore, actress
- Alva Belmont, socialite and suffrage benefactor
- Mrs. Perry Belmont (Jessie Ann Robbins), wife of the New York politician and diplomat
- Sarah Bernhardt, actress
- Elizabeth Lucy Bibesco, English writer and socialite
- Amelia Bingham, actress
- Alice Stone Blackwell, suffrage leader and editor
- Emily Newell Blair, writer, suffragist, feminist, Democratic Party leader
- Harriot Stanton Blatch, suffragist
- Anna E. Blount, president of the National Medical Women's Association
- Susan Elizabeth Blow, educator, the "Mother of the Kindergarten"
- 'Round-the-world journalist Nellie Bly
- Film actress Eleanor Boardman
- Lawyer and suffragist Inez Milholland Boissevain
- Catherine Booth-Clibborn of the Salvation Army,
- Louise DeKoven Bowen, financial supporter of suffrage movement
- Mary Carroll Craig Bradford, the only woman delegate at the 1908 Democratic National Convention in Denver, Colorado
- Catherine Breshkovsky, "grandmother of the Russian revolution"
- Helene Hathaway Robison Britton, owner of the St. Louis Cardinals
- Sallie Britton, daughter of James H. Britton, mayor of St. Louis, married to James Mackin, New York state treasurer
- Izetta Jewel Brown, actress, women's rights activist and Democratic politician
- Mary K. Browne, professional tennis player and amateur golfer
- Attorney Mary Baird Bryan and her husband, William Jennings Bryan, two-time presidential candidate, and two grandchildren
- Actress Billie Burke
- Mrs. Adolphus Busch III (Florence McRhea Lambert), first wife of the brewery executive
- Sarah Schuyler Butler, Republican activist

== C ==
- S. Parkes Cadman, minister and advice columnist
- Steelmaker Andrew Carnegie
- Anna Ella Carroll, politician, pamphleteer and lobbyist
- Anna Case, opera singer
- Dancer and animal-rights activist Irene Castle, wife of Chicago businessman Frederic McLaughlin
- Dancer Vernon Castle
- Carrie Chapman Catt, suffrage leader
- Espiridiona Cenda, dancer also known as Chiquita
- Cécile Chaminade, French composer
- Percival Chubb, Ethical Cultural Society leader
- Kate Claxton, actress
- Mrs. Cornelius Cole, one of the first three women accredited to a Republican National Convention
- Nancy Cook, suffragist, educator, political organizer, businesswoman
- Phoebe Couzins, lawyer
- Caroline Bartlett Crane, known as "America's housekeeper" for her efforts to improve sanitation
- Raymond Crane, comedian and actor
- Missouri Lieutenant Governor Wallace Crossley
- Mrs. Shelby Cullom (Julia Fisher), wife of the Illinois senator
- Pearl Lenore Curran, author and medium, wife of John H. Curran, Missouri immigration commissioner.

== D ==
- Secretary of the Navy Josephus Daniels and his wife, Addie Worth Bagley
- Dwight F. Davis, businessman and founder of the Davis Cup
- Rose Davis, rodeo rider
- Thamara de Swirsky, dancer
- Actress Marie Doro
- Loren and Dora Doxey, accused of murder
- Anne Dallas Dudley, suffragist

== E ==
- Aviator Amelia Earhart
- Crystal Eastman, feminist and political activist
- Catherine (Kitty) Elkins, daughter of Senator Stephen Benton Elkins, who wanted to marry Prince Luigi Amedeo, Duke of the Abruzzi
- Effie Ellsler, actress
- Julian Eltinge, cross-dressing actor

== F ==
- Martha P. Falconer, social reformer
- Diomede Falconio, apostolic delegate from the Vatican to the United States
- Frank H. Farris, attorney, member of both the Missouri state Senate and its House of Representatives
- Beatrice Farnham, artist and entrepreneur, the wife of John Otto (park ranger)
- Martha Ellis Fischel, social service worker, mother of Edna Fischel Gellhorn, suffragist and reformer
- Judith Ellen Foster, government official
- James F. Fulbright, representative, Missouri Legislature

== G ==
- Joe Gans, boxer
- Mary Garden, actress
- Missouri Governor and Mrs. Fred Gardner
- Dancer Adeline Genée
- Edna Fischel Gellhorn (Mrs. George), suffragist and reformer
- James Gibbons, Roman Catholic cardinal
- Artist Charles Dana Gibson
- Irene Langhorne Gibson, philanthropist and Democratic National Convention delegate, the original Gibson Girl
- Catholic Archbishop John J. Glennon
- Emma Goldman, activist and writer
- Samuel Gompers, labor leader
- Edith Kelly Gould, wife of a millionaire Gould
- Edward Howland Robinson Green, the only son of the miser Hetty Green
- Isabella Greenway (Mrs. John C.), Arizona politician
- Minnie J. Grinstead, teacher, Republican politician, and temperance worker

== H ==
- Mrs. Herbert S. Hadley (Agnes Lee), wife of Missouri's governor
- Beatrice Forbes-Robertson Hale, English actress, lecturer, and writer
- Anna Dall, daughter of Franklin and Eleanor Roosevelt
- Florence Mabel Harding, wife of President Warren G. Harding
- Grace Carley Harriman, social leader and philanthropist
- Mary Garrett Hay, New York suffragist
- Grace Bryan Hargreaves, daughter of the William Jennings Bryans
- Millicent Hearst, philanthropist and wife of the newspaper magnate, William Randolph Hearst
- Robert Herrick (novelist)
- Sallie Aley Hert, Republican activist, married to Alvin Tobias Hert
- Dancer and choreographer Gertrude Hoffmann
- Helen B. Houston, wife of David F. Houston, secretary of agriculture
- Mrs. Patrick J. Hurley, wife of the Republican activist
- Writer Fannie Hurst
- May Arkwright Hutton, Idaho suffragist

== J ==
- Charles "Buffalo" Jones, frontiersman, farmer, rancher, hunter, and conservationist
- Mary Harris Jones, or "Mother" Jones, labor organizer

== K ==
- Annette Kellerman, athlete who swam the English Channel
- Florence Kelley, social and political reformer
- Araminta Cooper Kern, wife of John W. Kern, the Democratic candidate for Vice-President, and their son, William
- Missouri State Senator Thomas Kinney

== L ==
- Mrs. Albert Bond Lambert, socialite. Her husband was an industrialist, aviator, and golfer.
- Mrs. William Palmer Ladd, wife of the dean of the Berkeley Divinity School
- Jacob M. Lashley, lawyer, debated film censorship
- Judge Ben Lindsey, social reformer
- Ruth Bryan Leavitt, politician and the first woman appointed as a United States ambassador
- Fifi Widener Leidy, daughter of Pennsylvania art collector Joseph E. Widener and wife of New York politician George Eustis Paine
- Lydia Lipkowska, opera singer
- Jack London, writer
- Alice Roosevelt Longworth, celebrity and daughter of Theodore Roosevelt
- Daniel A. Lord, American Catholic writer
- Joan Lowell, actress
- Felice Lyne, singer

== M ==
- Mrs. Norman E. Mack, wife of the editor and publisher of the Buffalo Daily Times, with their daughter, Norma
- Percy MacKaye, actor, director, playwright
- Elliot Woolfolk Major, Missouri governor, and his wife
- Richard Mansfield, actor
- Lois Marshall, wife of Vice-President Thomas R. Marshall
- Elisabeth Marbury, theatrical and literary agent and producer
- Anne Henrietta Martin, president of the National Woman's Party
- Frederick Townsend Martin, New York society leader and writer
- Ned Martin, dancer and choreographer
- Eleanor Randolph Wilson McAdoo, daughter of President Wilson and wife of William Gibbs McAdoo
- Ellen Wilson McAdoo, daughter of Eleanor Randolph Wilson McAdoo and William Gibbs McAdoo
- Sterling H. McCarty, representative, Missouri Legislature
- Edith Rockefeller McCormick (Mrs. Harold), socialite and opera patron
- Katrina McCormick, Republican activist
- Ruth Hanna McCormick (Mrs. Medill), Republican politician
- Catherine Waugh McCulloch, lawyer and suffragist
- Mary McDowell, social reformer
- George McManus, cartoonist, and Florence Bergere
- "Countess" Candido Mendes de Almeida, wife of the Brazilian politician
- Elizabeth Avery Meriwether, author and suffrage advocate
- Mrs. Lee Meriwether, wife of the author
- Patsy Ruth Miller, motion picture actress
- Tamaki Miura, opera singer
- Anne Tracy Morgan, philanthropist
- Alexander Pollock Moore, diplomat, editor and publisher
- Isabel Morrison, wife of New York politician Timothy Woodruff
- "Czar" Thomas E. Mulvihill Sr., St. Louis excise commissioner
- Actress, dancer, film producer, and screenwriter Mae Murray

== N ==
- Alla Nazimova, actress
- Oscar Nelson, boxer
- Ione Page Nicoll, worked for repeal of the 18th (Prohibition) Amendment
- Lillian Nordica, opera singer

== O ==
- Barbara Blackman O'Neil (Mrs. David), socialite and suffragist
- Mrs. John E. Osborne (Selena Smith), wife of the governor of Wyoming

== P ==
- Theophile Papin, society leader and "squire of debutantes"
- Sylvia Pankhurst, English suffragist
- Charles Henry Parkhurst, social reformer
- Cissy Patterson, journalist and publisher
- Irene Pavloska, opera singer
- Anna J. Hardwicke Pennybacker (Mrs.Percy), president of the General Federation of Women's Clubs
- Alexandra Carlisle Pfeiffer, actress and suffragist
- Gifford Pinchot, forester and politician
- Florence Collins Porter, newspaper editor, clubwoman, political campaigner, a Republican
- Ruth Baker Pratt, Republican politician
- Florence Pretz, inventor of the Billiken doll

== R ==
- Mrs. James A. Reed (Lura M. Olmsted), wife of the former U.S. senator from Missouri
- Ben Reitman, anarchist and medical doctor
- Agnes Repplier, essayist
- Mrs. Alexander Revell, wife of the Illinois businessman
- The young Florence Wyman Richardson, daughter of the older Florence Wyman Richardson and sister-in-law to Ernest Hemingway
- Lucyle Roberts, rodeo rider
- Margaret Dreier Robins, labor leader
- Corinne Roosevelt Robinson, writer and lecturer
- Duchesse de la Rochefoucauld, Parisian property owner
- Ginger Rogers, actress
- Betsey Cushing Roosevelt
- Kermit Roosevelt, writer and businessman, son of Theodore Roosevelt
- President Theodore Roosevelt, his wife (Edith Roosevelt) and his daughter (Ethel Roosevelt)
- Nellie Tayloe Ross, Republican politician and ex-governor of Wyoming
- Charlotte Rumbold, St. Louis and Cleveland social reformer
- Lillian Russell, the actress
- Patrick John Ryan, Catholic prelate

== S ==
- Pauline Sabin, Republican activist opposed to Prohibition
- Katherine Sandwina, circus strongwoman
- Birth-control advocate Margaret Sanger
- Nathaniel Schmidt, educator
- Rose Schneiderman, labor-union executive
- Mrs. Nathan B. Scott, wife of the U.S. senator from West Virginia
- Cecil J. Sharp, who introduced folk dancing to the United States
- Finley Johnson Shepard, businessman-husband of Helen Gould
- Anna Howard Shaw, suffrage leader
- Ruth Hanna Simms, politician, activist and publisher
- Mrs. Al Smith (Catherine Ann Dunn), wife of the New York governor, and their daughter, Emily Smith Warner
- Elizabeth Blackmon Smith, popular author of romantic fiction who wrote under the name Mrs. Harry Pugh Smith
- Evangelist Gipsy Smith and his wife, Annie E. Pennock
- Senator Reed Smoot of Utah
- Ethel Annakin Snowden, British suffragist and pacifist.
- Christine Bradley South of Kentucky, chairman, Woman's Division, Republican National Committee
- Lena Jones Wade Springs, nominated for U.S. vice-president at 1924 Democratic national convention
- Katherine Stinson, aviator
- Rose Pastor Stokes, socialist activist, writer, and feminist
- Winifred Sackville Stoner Jr., child prodigy
- Mrs. Edward T. Stotesbury (Eva Roberts Cromwell), wife of the investment banker
- Representative William Sulzer of New York and his wife, Clara Rodelheim
- Thamara de Swirsky, Russian dancer[]

== T ==
- Mrs. Charles P. Taft, wife of the newspaper publisher, and Louise Taft, their daughter
- Presidential candidate William Howard Taft and Helen Herron Taft, and their grandchildren
- Lilyan Tashman, actress
- Sara Teasdale, poet
- Ellen Terry, actress
- Luisa Tetrazzini, opera singer
- M. Louise Thomas, educator.
- Socialite Edwine Thornburgh, later married to Englishman Wilfrid Peek
- Genevieve Clark Thomson, suffragist, reporter, Louisiana politician and daughter of Speaker of the House Champ Clark
- Prince Paul Troubetzkoy, a Russian artist, and Princess Troubetzkoy, his American wife
- Grace Wilbur Trout, Illinois suffragist

== U ==
- Harriet Taylor Upton, political activist and author, a Republican

== V ==
- Bernard Vaughan, Roman Catholic priest from the UK
- Louise Vermilya, mass murderer
- Bertha Von Suttner, Nobel laureate
- Rube Waddell, baseball player

== W ==
- Charlotte Walker, actress
- Eugene Walter, playwright
- Fannie Ward, actress
- Mabel Walker Willebrandt, attorney and Republican activist
- Ella Wilson, first woman mayor of Hunnewell, Kansas, reputedly the first woman mayor in the nation
- President Woodrow Wilson and his family, Mrs. Wilson, and their daughters, Margaret, Jessie, and Eleanor
- Film actress Claire Windsor
- Jane Frances Winn, who wrote under the name "Frank Fair"
- Wu Tingfang, Chinese ambassador to the United States
- Margaret (Mrs. John) Wyeth of St. Louis, delegate to 1935 Republican National Convention

== Y ==
- Julie Chamberlain Nichols Yates, sculptor; wife of Halsey E. Yates, Army officer
- Ella Flagg Young, educator
- Mrs. Lafayette Young, wife of the Iowa newspaper publisher
