= Slater, Missouri =

- City
- Location of Slater, Missouri
- Coordinates: 39°13′22″N 93°3′54″W
- Country: United States
- State: Missouri
- County: Saline

Area
  - Total: 1.45 sq mi (3.75 km^{2})
  - Land: 1.44 sq mi (3.74 km^{2})
  - Water: 0 sq mi (0.00 km^{2})
- Elevation: 840 ft (260 m)

Population (2020)
  - Total: 1,834
  - Estimate (2023): 2,256
  - Density: 1,268.7/sq mi (489.85/km^{2})
- Time zone: UTC-6 (Central (CST))
  - Summer (DST): UTC-5 (CDT)
- ZIP code: 65349
- Area code: 660
- FIPS code: 29-68204
- GNIS feature ID: 2395896
- Website: https://www.cityofslater.com/

Slater is a city in Saline County, Missouri, United States. The population was 2,256 at the 2020 census.

== History ==
Slater was laid out in 1889. A post office called Slater has been in operation since 1878. The community has the name of John F. Slater, a railroad official.

== Geography ==
According to the United States Census Bureau, the city has a total area of 1.44 square miles (3.73 km^{2}), all land.

== Demographics ==
Historical population
Census	Pop.	Note	%±
1880	771		—
1890	2,400		211.3%
1900	2,502		4.3%
1910	3,238		29.4%
1920	3,797		17.3%
1930	3,478		−8.4%
1940	3,070		−11.7%
1950	2,836		−7.6%
1960	2,767		−2.4%
1970	2,576		−6.9%
1980	2,492		−3.3%
1990	2,186		−12.3%
2000	2,083		−4.7%
2010	1,856		−10.9%
2020	1,834		−1.2%
U.S. Decennial Census

=== 2020 census ===
As of the 2020 census, Slater had a population of 1,834. The median age was 41.9 years. 22.9% of residents were under the age of 18 and 20.3% of residents were 65 years of age or older. For every 100 females there were 95.7 males, and for every 100 females age 18 and over there were 91.1 males age 18 and over.

0.0% of residents lived in urban areas, while 100.0% lived in rural areas.

There were 789 households in Slater, of which 28.9% had children under the age of 18 living in them. Of all households, 37.6% were married-couple households, 22.4% were households with a male householder and no spouse or partner present, and 30.4% were households with a female householder and no spouse or partner present. About 34.6% of all households were made up of individuals and 16.6% had someone living alone who was 65 years of age or older.

There were 963 housing units, of which 18.1% were vacant. The homeowner vacancy rate was 5.1% and the rental vacancy rate was 16.9%.

Racial composition as of the 2020 census
Race	Number	Percent
White	1,530	83.4%
Black or African American	115	6.3%
American Indian and Alaska Native	8	0.4%
Asian	7	0.4%
Native Hawaiian and Other Pacific Islander	2	0.1%
Some other race	37	2.0%
Two or more races	135	7.4%
Hispanic or Latino (of any race)	59	3.2%

=== Demographic estimates ===
In accordance to the World Population Review, in 2024, the number is estimated to have dropped to 1,770 people, with a median age of 36.7 years. The female population is at 925 while the male population is at 1,062.

=== Income and poverty ===
The average income household income is $49,449 with a poverty rate of 21.2%.

=== 2010 census ===
As of the census of 2010, there were 1,856 people, 785 households, and 469 families living in the city. The population density was 1,288.9 inhabitants per square mile (497.6/km^{2}). There were 1,003 housing units at an average density of 696.5 per square mile (268.9/km^{2}). The racial makeup of the city was 90.1% White, 6.4% African American, 0.2% Native American, 0.4% Asian, 1.2% from other races, and 1.8% from two or more races. Hispanic or Latino people of any race were 2.6% of the population.

There were 785 households, of which 30.3% had children under the age of 18 living with them, 41.7% were married couples living together, 12.5% had a female householder with no husband present, 5.6% had a male householder with no wife present, and 40.3% were non-families. 34.1% of all households were made up of individuals, and 17.4% had someone living alone who was 65 years of age or older. The average household size was 2.30 and the average family size was 2.94.

The median age in the city was 43 years. 23.2% of residents were under the age of 18; 7.1% were between the ages of 18 and 24; 22.1% were from 25 to 44; 27.5% were from 45 to 64; and 20.2% were 65 years of age or older. The gender makeup of the city was 49.2% male and 50.8% female.

=== 2000 census ===
As of the census of 2000, there were 2,083 people, 895 households, and 539 families living in the city. The population density was 1,439.1 inhabitants per square mile (555.6/km^{2}). There were 1,072 housing units at an average density of 740.6 per square mile (285.9/km^{2}). The racial makeup of the city was 87.04% White, 9.60% African American, 0.19% Native American, 0.19% Asian, 0.05% Pacific Islander, 1.01% from other races, and 1.92% from two or more races. Hispanic or Latino people of any race were 1.63% of the population.

There were 895 households, out of which 28.0% had children under the age of 18 living with them, 42.9% were married couples living together, 12.5% had a female householder with no husband present, and 39.7% were non-families. 36.5% of all households were made up of individuals, and 21.9% had someone living alone who was 65 years of age or older. The average household size was 2.26 and the average family size was 2.88.

In the city the population was spread out, with 23.2% under the age of 18, 9.6% from 18 to 24, 25.1% from 25 to 44, 20.2% from 45 to 64, and 21.9% who were 65 years of age or older. The median age was 40 years. For every 100 females there were 92.3 males. For every 100 females age 18 and over, there were 86.0 males.

The median income for a household in the city was $25,270, and the median income for a family was $36,281. Males had a median income of $25,969 versus $18,526 for females. The per capita income for the city was $12,863. About 13.5% of families and 18.2% of the population were below the poverty line, including 24.4% of those under age 18 and 18.6% of those age 65 or over.

== Education ==
Public education in Slater is administered by Slater School District.

Slater has a lending library, the Slater Public Library.

== Notable natives and residents ==
- Felice Lyne – American opera singer (1887–1935)
- Steve McQueen - American actor (1930–1980)
- Joe Kleine - American NBA player (1962–present)
- Virgil Thomson - American composer (1896–1989)
