= Thomas E. Mulvihill Sr. =

Thomas E. Mulvihill Sr. (about 1863-1942) was known as "Czar" Mulvihill in St. Louis, Missouri, because of his rigid enforcement of liquor laws when he was excise commissioner of that city.

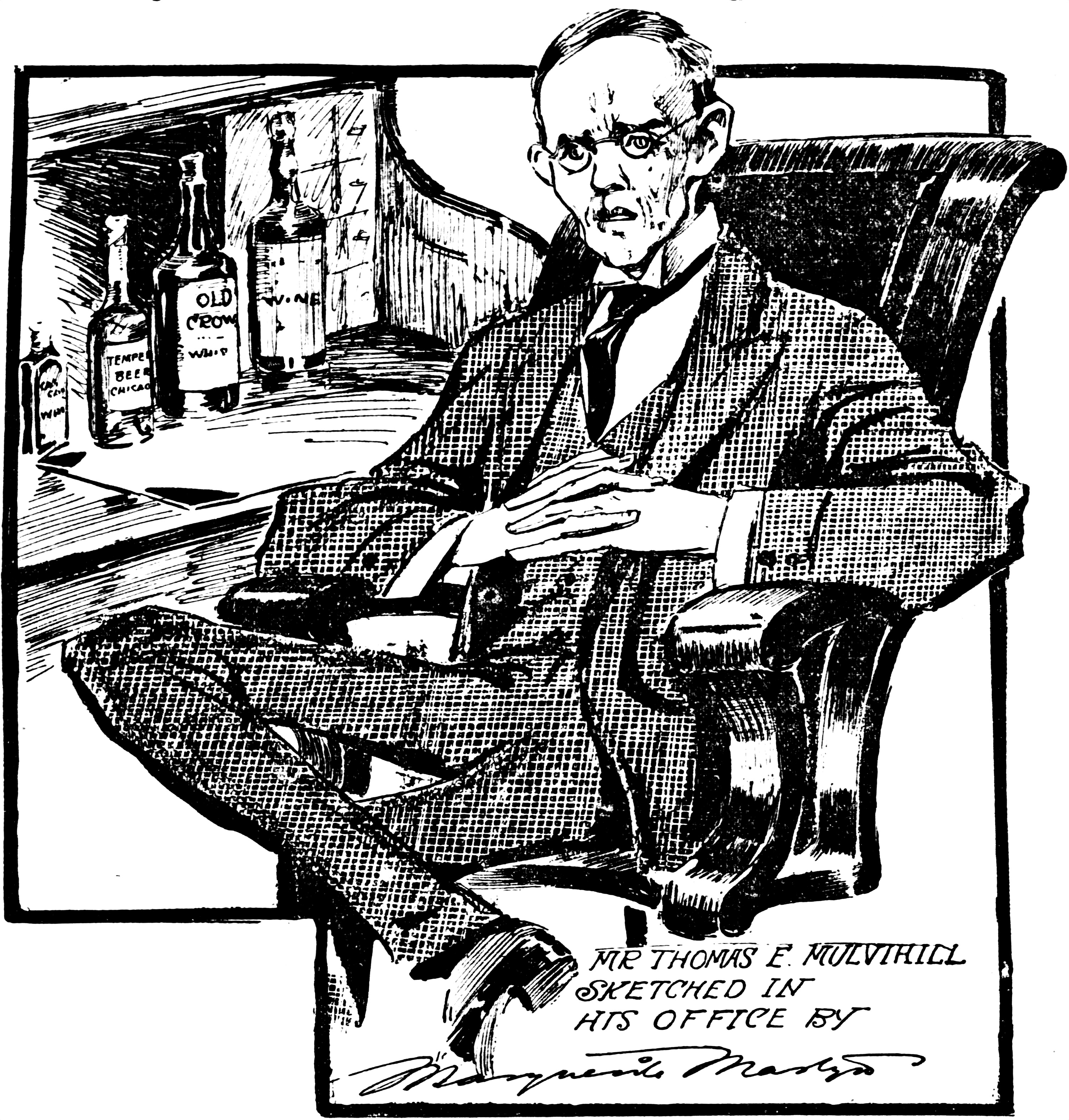
Mulvihill as sketched in his office by journalist Marguerite Martyn, 1908

Mulvihill was born in Ireland about 1863 and was brought to the United States when he was four years old. He graduated from the Washington University School of Law in 1885. He was St. Louis city attorney under Mayor Edward A. Noonan and later was elected prosecuting attorney. He was circuit court parole officer from 1935 until his death on January 20, 1942, at the age of 79.

He was survived by his wife, the former Katherine M. Daily; and five children. Burial was in Calvary Cemetery (St. Louis).

Mulvihill was the first excise commissioner to enforce the Sunday closing laws for saloons.
