= Thamara de Swirsky =

Russian-born dancer (1888–1961)

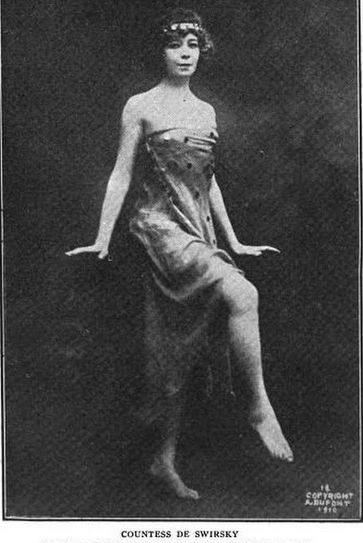
Thamara de Swirsky, from a 1910 publication

Thamara de Swirsky (October 17, 1888 — December 24, 1961), sometimes seen as Tamara de Svirsky, Thamara Swirskaya, or Countess de Swirsky, was a Russian-born dancer, known for dancing barefoot.

== Early life ==
Thamara de Swirsky was born in St. Petersburg into a prosperous Russian family. She studied piano in Paris and Munich, and dance in St. Petersburg.

Her claim on the title "Countess" was disputed. Her mother, Zenaide de Podwissotski, may have been a medical doctor in Paris before accompanying Thamara to the United States.

== Career ==
De Swirsky, publicized in 1911 as having the "most musical body in the world", "created a sensation" in the United States with her barefoot dancing. Reviewers assured (or warned) readers that, while her feet were bare, she did not dance nude. "Her costumes are triumphs of sartorial amplitude," declared one disappointed critic. "They leave everything to the imagination." She also performed a "bat dance" with billowing sheer fabric wings. She was the last advertised performer to appear at the Coliseum Garden Theatre in Raton, New Mexico, before it was destroyed in a 1911 fire.

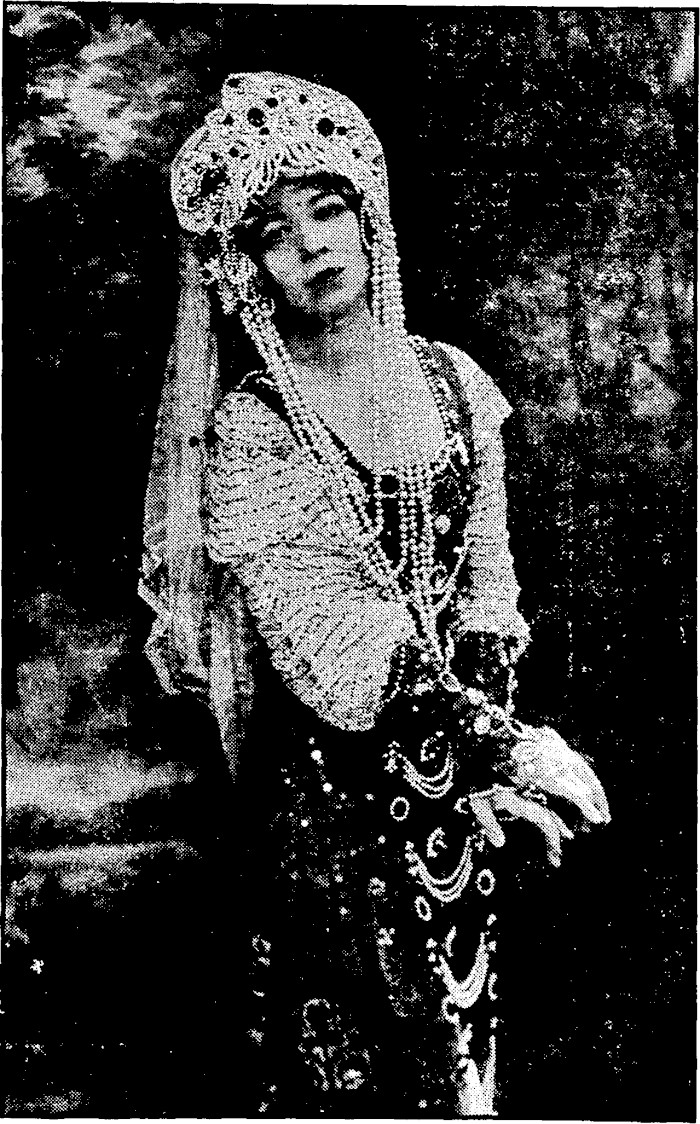
Photo of Thamara de Swirsky from the Daily Illini

Thamara de Swirsky also played piano as part of some of her performances. "Her style of dancing is her own," explained one Los Angeles reporter. Beyond the vaudeville stage, at the Metropolitan Opera she appeared as a dancer in Orfeo ed Euridice and Zar und Zimmermann, both in 1909. In January 1910 she danced in Delibes' Lakmé with the Boston Opera, at English's Opera House. In 1912 she performed a version of her dances in a short silent film for Independent Moving Pictures. In 1913 she was part of an advertising campaign for Seduction perfume.

Her opinions, whims, and demands made news. She smoked cigars and cigarettes. She was said to have insured each of her toes for $10,000 in 1910. In 1914, she was a member of Anna Pavlova's company, and her pleas for a more humid New York hotel room were reported in the New York Times. Italian artist Piero Tozzi painted a portrait of de Swirsky, titled "His Flame of Life", when she turned away his romantic interest.

During World War I she performed in New York, combining dance and "dramatic art". In 1919 she appeared in a silent film, The Mad Woman, made by the Stage Women's War Relief Fund.

In 1910, John Jacob Astor bought 25 seats for one of her concerts in Newport, Rhode Island, and sat by himself in the center to watch her performance.

== Personal life ==
Sketched by Marguerite Martyn of the St. Louis Post-Dispatch, and published April 23, 1911

In 1933 there were reports that Swirskaya was engaged to marry twice-widowed New York lawyer Frederick G. Fischer and that his family committed him to an asylum to prevent the match.

Thamara de Swirsky professed particular love for Los Angeles as early as 1910, recalling that "I knew when I first touched foot to your soil that here I would find the warmth and the glow which would call out the best that is in me." She settled in Los Angeles after her dance career; she taught and played piano for a living. She died there in 1961, weeks after she was badly injured in a traffic accident during a storm, aged 73 years.

There is a statuette of Thamara de Swirsky in a dance pose, by Paolo Troubetzkoy, in the collection of the Getty Museum. Her unpublished memoirs have also been discovered in recent years.
