= Louise Vermilya =

American serial killer (1868–1913)

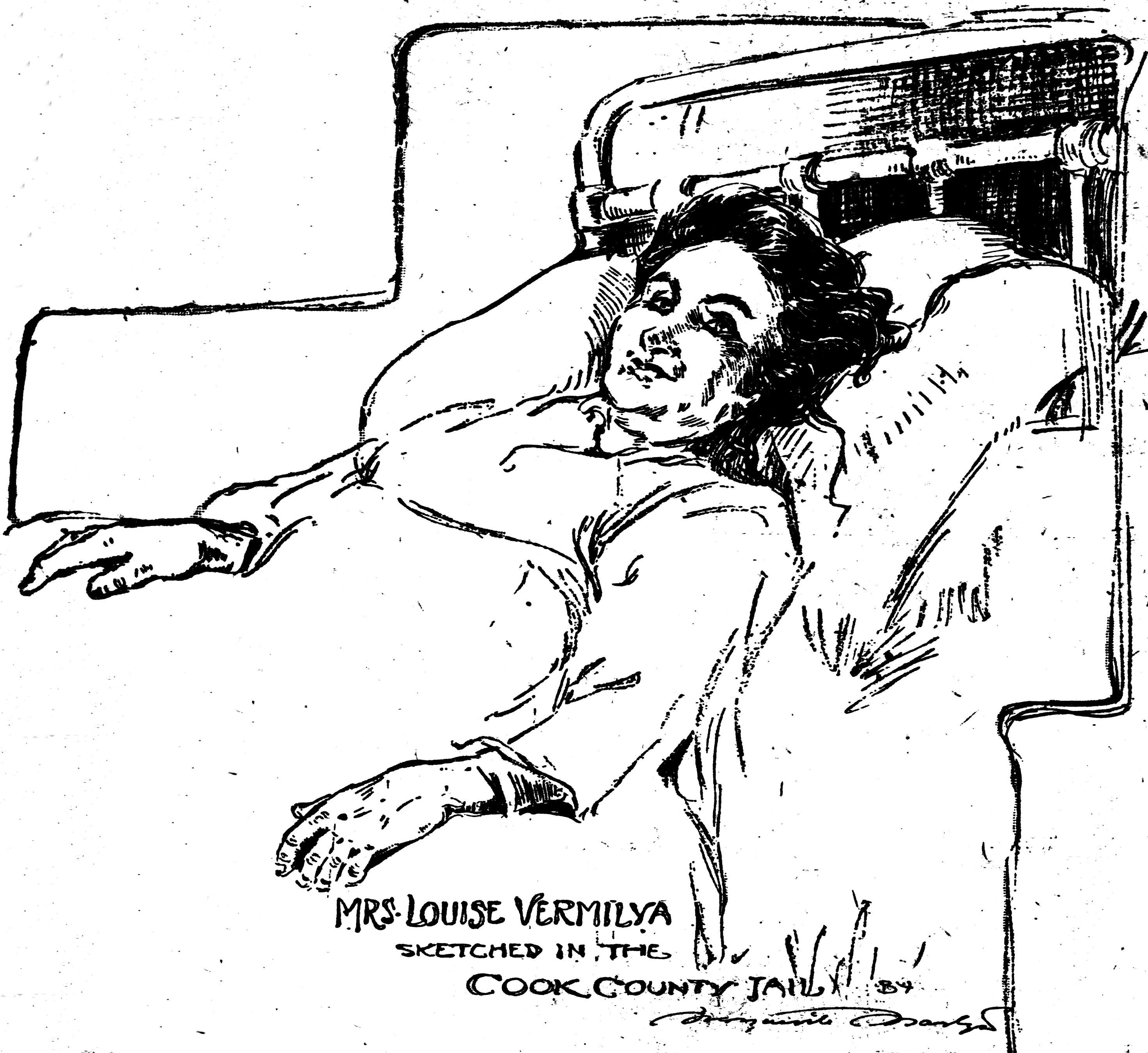
- 1911 sketch of Vermilya by Marguerite Martyn
- Born: Louesa Woolf; July 1868; Cook County, Illinois, U.S.
- Died: December 31, 1913 (aged 45); Illinois, U.S.
- Penalty: Charges dismissed

Details
- Victims: 9
- Span of crimes: 1893–1911
- Country: United States
- State: Illinois
- Imprisoned at: 1911–1913 while awaiting trial

Louise Vermilya (née Woolf; July 1868 – December 1913) was an American "black widow" serial killer whose activities spanned the turn of the 20th century. Light was shed on her murders only after she resorted to murdering outside of her immediate family, beginning with the death of policeman Arthur Bissonette. Authorities were alerted and suspicion arose over the peculiar and similar fates experienced by her two husbands, several immediate family members and two associates known to her.

== Early life ==
Louise Vermilya was born Louesa Woolf in Cook County, Illinois, to parents Wilhemina (née Munaroe) and John Woolf, Prussian immigrants. She was the oldest daughter of five girls and third oldest child out of 11 siblings. She married 24-year-old Fred Brinkamp on April 2, 1885, at the age of 16 and moved to the village of Barrington within the Cuba township of Lake County in northern Illinois.

== Early murders ==
The string of homicides began in 1893, when Vermilya claimed the life of her first husband, Fred Brinkamp, while living on their farm near Barrington, Illinois. The coroner ruled Brinkamp's death to be attributed to a heart attack. Following his death, she inherited $5,000 from a life insurance policy Brinkamp had which named her as the beneficiary. Due to Brinkamp's age at death, no suspicions arose as it was thought to be due to natural causes.

Brinkamp left behind six children, two of whom met similar fates to their father shortly after his death. Cora Brinkamp was the first to die at age eight, with her sister Florence following at four and a half years old.

Undertaker E.N. Blocks, who owned a mortuary in Barrington, recalled that Louise enjoyed working around bodies. Despite not being a salaried employee, Vermilya seemed too eager to work in the mortuary with Blocks "while I never employed her for a couple of years I couldn't keep her out of the office". Blocks also stated that "at every death she would seem to hear of it just as soon as I and she would reach the house only a little behind me."

== Subsequent murders ==
Vermilya moved to Chicago in 1906 with her minor charges in tow. It was while living in Chicago that Vermilya claimed the life of her stepdaughter, 26-year-old Lillian Brinkamp. The coroner, however, ruled her cause of death as "acute nephritis". Due to the unusually high number of deaths within the Brinkamp family, they were thought to be cursed.

Around this time, Vermilya remarried to a man named Charles Vermilya, aged 59. Three years later, he died, apparently victim to sudden illness. He left his widow with $1,000 in cash and a home in Crystal Lake, Illinois, forty-five miles northwest of Chicago. Her stepson, Harry Vermilya, followed his father in death shortly after quarreling with Louise over the sale of the Crystal Lake estate. No suspicions arose after the deaths, and coincidence was blamed.

The following year, in 1910, Vermilya inherited $1,200 after the death of her 23-year-old son from her first marriage, Frank Brinkamp. Frank had been married to a widow and divorced her, receiving $1,200 from the divorce proceedings. On his death bed, he voiced suspicion involving his stepmother to his fiancée, Elizabeth Nolan, stating he was "going the way his father did."

Uncharacteristically, Vermilya began poisoning acquaintances. Jason Rupert, a railroad fireman, fell ill after dining with Vermilya on January 15, 1910. He died two days later, but was only the first in a series of deaths of boarders in Vermilya's home. In February 1910, Vermilya married Richard Smith, a train conductor and boarder at her home. On March 11, 1910, two days after eating a meal prepared by Vermilya, he met a similar fate to Vermilya's prior boarder. His death was determined to be caused by gastritis.

Smith was still married at the time of his supposed nuptials to Vermilya. His estranged wife believed that the circumstances surrounding her husband's death were suspicious. She believed that Smith was murdered for one of three reasons, "either Mrs. Vermilya loved Smith and was afraid that he would desert her, or he was murdered for his money, or C. C. Boysen, the undertaker, thought to be in love with Mrs. Vermilya, was jealous". While her motive in the earlier deaths of her family members was pursuit of financial gain, they became unclear after the deaths of her boarders, for whom she gained no monetary rewards.

== Undoing ==
It wasn't until Arthur Bissonette came to dine with Vermilya did she experience her undoing. While dining with his father at the Vermilya home in October 1911, both of the Bissonettes started experiencing abdominal pain. Homicide detectives became suspicious after questioning Bissonette's father who states he saw Vermilya sprinkling "white pepper" over their meals prior to serving them. This led the Chicago Police Department to do an autopsy on Bissonette's body revealing arsenic poisoning. Vermilya was taken into custody soon after its discovery.

There is some speculation as to whether Bissonette's death was precipitated by financial motives. With Vermilya's assistance, Bissonette was accepted into the Home Guard, a militia-like entity for those men who were unable to qualify for the military. In return, Bissonette was to make a will naming Vermilya as the sole beneficiary of the insurance policy he would carry as a result of this employment. Vermilya was to name him as her beneficiary for the life insurance that she carried after their nuptials.

Bissonette authored a will shortly before his death, but named his fiancé who lived in nearby Kankakee, Lydia Rivard, as the beneficiary of his estate. Though Vermilya was listed as the witness, she claimed to have no knowledge of ever signing the document.

== Suicide attempts and trial ==
On November 4, Vermilya was rushed to the hospital after playing victim to her own modus operandi. Authorities reported Vermilya had been ingesting the "white pepper" since her house arrest on October 28. By November 9, she was reported as being near her death with comorbidities such as valvular heart problems adding to her demise. Vermilya was discharged from the county hospital on November 24, 1911. By December 9, she was stricken with paralysis, which physicians stated was a permanent condition.

Nevertheless, Vermilya was required to attend all her court proceedings, and usually did so in a wheelchair. Vermilya was arraigned before Municipal Judge Walker on 6 November 1911 for the death of Arthur Bissonette. On 7 March 1912, nolle prosequi was filed after it had been found that Bissonette had been taking medication containing arsenic. In an effort to expedite court proceedings, a conference was held between the presiding judge, Judge Kersten, attorney Joseph R. Barres, and the prosecutor on the case.

The prosecutor was reticent as to the strongest points and the motive in Smith's death stating "There are several cases as to which Mrs. Vermilya may be tried and I don't want to try her more than once...For that reason, I want to pick out the strongest one and I have concluded the Smith one is the strongest one." Vermilya was rearrested and charged for the murder of Richard Smith.

Evidence of arsenic poisoning was found in Smith's liver via autopsy conducted by Prof. Walter S. Haines, the Rush Medical College expert chemist. His findings showed "arsenic in sufficient quantities in the viscera of the two men to cause death." Vermilya was taken into custody and detained in the county jail where she attempted suicide again. The trial began on 21 March 1912 and lasted 16 days. The case was resubmitted for trial ten days later, ending in another hung jury as evidence against her was deemed circumstantial.

There were subsequent difficulties that further complicated the progression of the trial. Juror selection had become an arduous process as men were unsure of if they could inflict the death penalty on a woman as freely as they would on a man. Nearly every man called forward had established a bias based on current newspaper accounts of the crime. A good percentage of these were sure that because of the impression made by the newspaper stories, they could not give a fair verdict.

About 50% of those who passed this barrier had a prejudice against circumstantial evidence which necessitated their being excused. Up to this point, the jury had been composed of an all-male panel, who were unable to not only impose a death sentence on a woman, but whose attitudes toward female defendants in murder cases also came into question. By 12 October 1912, Vermilya was still in custody awaiting trial along with fellow murderer Louisa Lindloff. On 28 June 1913, Vermilya was released on $5,000 bail due to concerns for her continued failing health and exposure to the summer heat in a non-airconditioned jail, pending her trial for the poisoning of Richard Smith.

== Dismissal of charges ==
On 18 April 1915, a conference was held between the Assistant State's Attorney, Michael Sullivan, and the State Attorney Hoyne regarding continuation of the trial. It was decided that it would be impossible to obtain a conviction on the Smith indictment, with Sullivan remarking "We could only see that another trial would entail a heavy cost without any assurance of being able to show any strong evidence." Per the request of Vermilya's attorney, all charges were dropped. Vermilya led a quiet life following the dismissal of her charges as no further documentation exists of her in local papers past this point.

It is estimated that Vermilya amassed a total of $15,000 from the nine deaths.

== See also ==
- List of serial killers in the United States
