= William N. Baltz =

American politician (1860–1943)

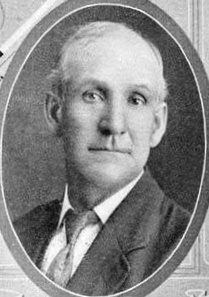

Member of the U.S. House of Representatives from Illinois's 22nd district
- In office March 4, 1913 – March 3, 1915
- Preceded by: William A. Rodenberg
- Succeeded by: William A. Rodenberg

Personal details
- Born: William Nicolas Baltz; February 5, 1860 Millstadt, Illinois, US
- Died: August 22, 1943 (aged 83) Millstadt, Illinois, US
- Party: Democratic
- Occupation: Politician

William Nicolas Baltz (February 5, 1860 – August 22, 1943) was an American politician. A Democrat, he was a member of the United States House of Representatives from Illinois.

== Early life and career ==
Baltz was born on February 5, 1860, in Millstadt, Illinois, the son of German immigrants Phillip Baltz and Henrietta (née Rodemich) Baltz. He worked as a banker, farmer, and mill owner.

Baltz was a member of the Millstadt Board of Education, serving as its president from 1892 to 1917. From 1897 to 1913, he was a member of the St. Clair County Board of Supervisors, serving as its presiding officer from 1908 to 1911. As a local politician, he helped introduce running water and sewer systems to the city. He was constable of Millstadt, and according to the Belleville News-Democrat, brought peace to the town during his tenure.

Baltz was a Democrat. From 1905 to 1913, he was a member of the St. Clair County Democratic Committee. He was a member of the United States House of Representatives, from March 4, 1913, to March 3, 1915, representing Illinois's 22nd district. During his tenure, he participated in a Congressional Baseball Game. He lost the following election, later losing the 1926 election. For six years, he was mayor of Millstadt. Ideologically, he was liberal.

After serving in Congress, Baltz returned to farming and industry. In 1908, he helped founded the First Bank of Millstadt, serving as its first vice-president, then as its president from 1915 to 1940. Around 1930, he gave his farm to his sons.

== Personal life and death ==
While in Congress, Baltz weighed 230 pounds (100 kg). On August 2, 1883, he married Catherine Diesel. He had four sons and two daughters. He died on August 22, 1943, aged 83, in Millstadt, and was buried at Mount Evergreen Cemetery. There is archive of his papers.

U.S. House of Representatives
Preceded by William A. Rodenberg	Member of the U.S. House of Representatives from Illinois's 22nd congressional district 1913–1915	Succeeded by William A. Rodenberg
