= Felice Lyne =

American opera singer (1887–1935)

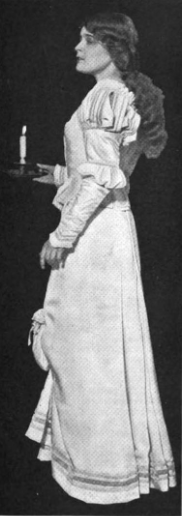
Coloratura soprano Felice Lyne as Glida in Rigoletto. London 1911.

Felice Lyne (1887-1935) was a coloratura soprano who was discovered by Oscar Hammerstein while she was a student in Paris, France, and debuted to acclaim in 1911 as Gilda in a London, England, performance of Rigoletto. She followed up with another sensation as Lucia in Lucia di Lammermoor alongside tenor Orville Harrold.

Lyne was petite and appeared childlike. In spite of Hammerstein's original vision for her career in primarily light opera, Lyne began to prove herself in more grand operatic roles. Her additional roles in Hammerstein's productions included the Doll in The Tales of Hoffmann, Juliette in Roméo et Juliette, Lisbeth in Hans the Flute Player, and Marguerite in Faust.

Less than year after her debut, Hammerstein and Lyne had a falling out. She told reporters that Hammerstein had grossly insulted her at the opera house, and that she had then struck him "so hard on his unprotected pate" with a score of Faust that she had sprained her thumb. She had also told reporters that Hammerstein was "a dead duck" as far as Londoners were concerned. The impresario categorically denied the embarrassing slapping incident, but promptly sued Miss Lyne for $100,000 in a libel suit about the "dead duck" remark. A sympathetic New York court ruled against Hammerstein, saying that it was not at all clear what the term "dead duck" applied to a human being signified, and that no term which was not understood could in any way be interpreted as libel. Hammerstein's London Opera House did indeed fail to survive, just as Lyne predicted.

Lyne made a handful of recordings for His Master's Voice in 1911, and for Columbia in the U.S. in 1915. She appeared in operatic roles in Sydney (1913), Paris (1914), and Boston (1915). In 1918, she appeared in a series of London recitals with the tenor Vladimir Rosing.

Felice Lyne died in 1935, age 43, in the home of her parents, Dr. and Mrs. Sandford T. Lyne of Allentown, Pennsylvania, after suffering from poor health for several years, and was buried in Greenwood Cemetery in Allentown.

One obituary noted that Miss Lyne was "small, piquant, exceedingly pretty and gifted with a voice of faultless purity. ... a coloratura soprano who flashed like a meteor across the operatic sky."
