= Marguerite Martyn =

American journalist (1878–1948)

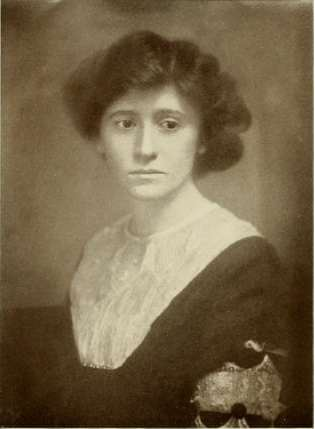
- Photo by Takuma Kajiwara
- Born: September 26, 1878
- Died: April 17, 1948 (aged 69); Webster Groves, Missouri, U.S.
- Occupation: Journalist
- Years active: 1905–1939

Marguerite Martyn (September 26, 1878 – April 17, 1948) was an American journalist and political cartoonist with the St. Louis Post-Dispatch in the early 20th century. She was noted as much for her published sketches as for her articles.

== Early life and education ==
Marguerite Martyn was born on September 26, 1878. Her father was William E. Martyn, and her mother was Fanny Plumb of Springfield, Missouri, whose family had been in that town for four generations. William and Fanny were married in 1877. The Martyn family lived in Portland, Oregon, during the early years of Martyn’s life, and her father, a Virginian, died there at the age of 30 while employed as a St. Louis–San Francisco Railway superintendent. Her mother then studied telegraphy and was employed by the same railway company.

When Martyn was 17 years old, the family returned to Springfield, and she enrolled in an arts program at Washington University in St. Louis.

== Career ==
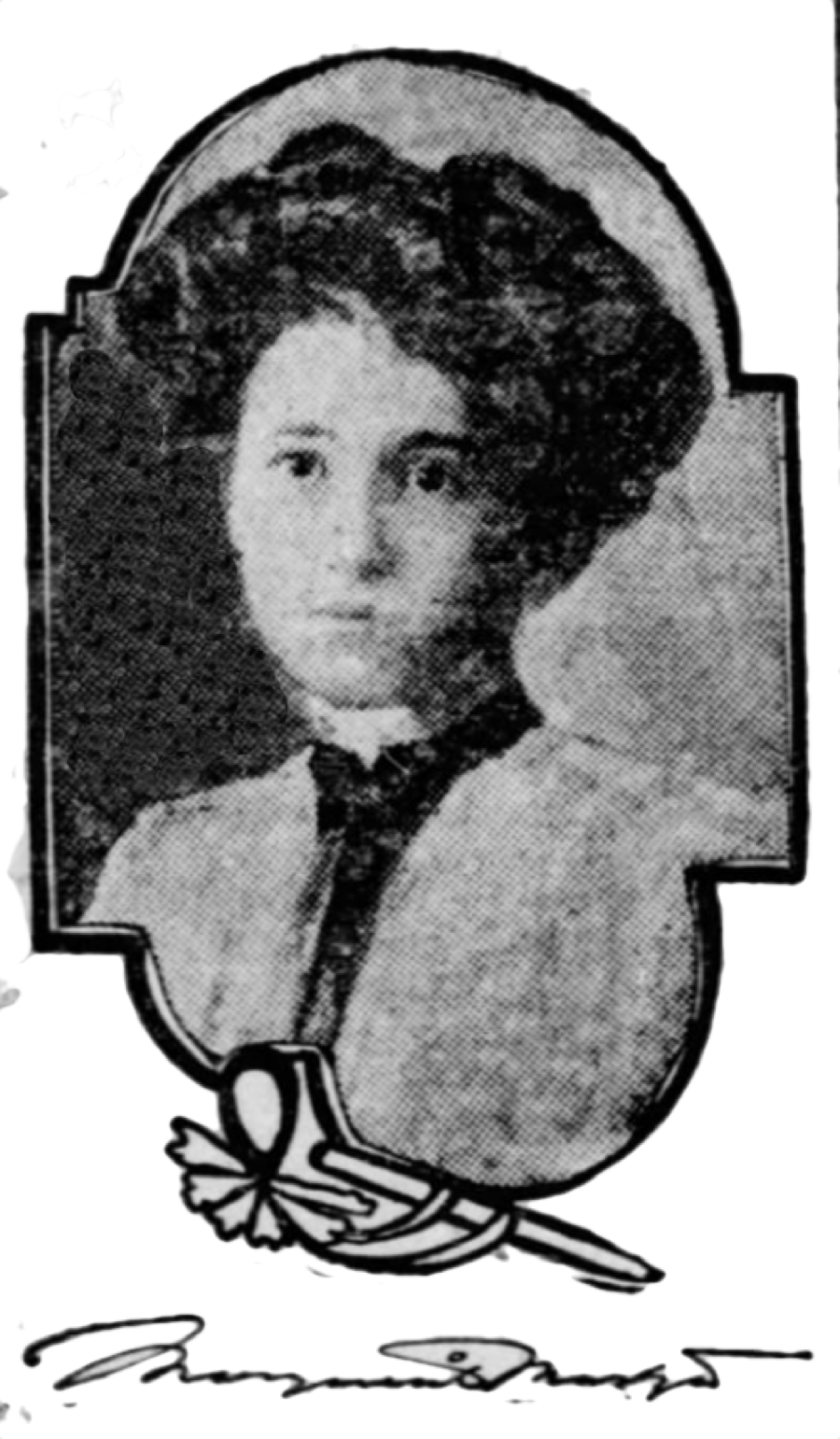
Martyn and her signature, 1908

In 1899, Martyn was an art student. During the St. Louis World's Fair of 1904, Martyn drew a poster which she thought would be applicable to the closing of the exposition, and she brought it to the Sunday editor of the St. Louis Post-Dispatch. It came too late for publication, but she was told to return with some other drawings, and, as a result, she was offered a job as an artist, a position she filled a year later.

At first, she illustrated articles in the newspaper's Sunday magazine. At one point she was told by the newspaper's managing editor to go to Belleville, Illinois, and interview a woman of note there, but she declined. The editor insisted, and she returned with a story which she handed in. The editor said it could not be printed and pointed to the fact that she had buried the most important information in the last paragraph. That was, it was said, "the first instruction she had ever had, and she has been writing successfully ever since."

The earliest work which carried her byline was a drawing of spectators and models at a St. Louis convention of the National Dressmakers' Association in September 1905, Martyn being the only artist admitted.

In 1908, Martyn and a roommate, Miss L.B. Friend, were unsuccessfully sued by Samuel Kessler, a "rich furrier" who owned their apartment building at 8A North Sarah Street, which they vacated without notice because the heat in their unit was not working. Kessler lost the case when Justice "Marty" Moore, who was himself a steamfitter at one time, queried the building janitor and found that the man had neither the proper engineering license nor the knowledge to substantiate the landlord's claim.

In Martyn's obituary, the Post-Dispatch said that she: "did a great variety of articles, mostly about individuals, but in some cases descriptive of public events, such as national political conventions, the Kentucky Derby race or World Series ball games." She also wrote about women's fashion and the women's suffrage movement, "in which she was enthusiastically interested." Other topics were men's fashion, stage drama, horse shows and college life.

Martyn's working style, in 1912, at least, was generally to ask few questions but then to listen "so intently one feels impelled to give the desired information." She took no notes but during the interview she made her sketch.

She was said to draw "in a light and sometimes fanciful style", which was also described as "gossamer-like".

== Personal life ==
Martyn had two brothers, William E., who died in 1942, and Philip T., who died in 1959.

Clair Kenamore, an editor on the Post-Dispatch, and Martyn were married in the latter's home at Lake and Bompart avenues in Webster Groves, Missouri, on May 17, 1913.

A rival newspaper, the St. Louis Star, reported: "This talented woman has the face of an artist – she is slim – rather tall, with red brown hair and beautiful brown eyes. To say she is quiet does not express it – meek is the proper word, not realizing that she is doing anything out of the ordinary, nor that the skillful way in which she handles her pencil ranks her as unusually gifted."

=== Death ===
Martyn retired in 1939 and died of a cerebral hemorrhage in her Webster Groves, Missouri home at 401 Lake Avenue, on April 17, 1948. Burial was in Oak Hill Cemetery in Kirkwood, Missouri.

== Self-sketches ==
Martyn included her own figure in some of her drawings.

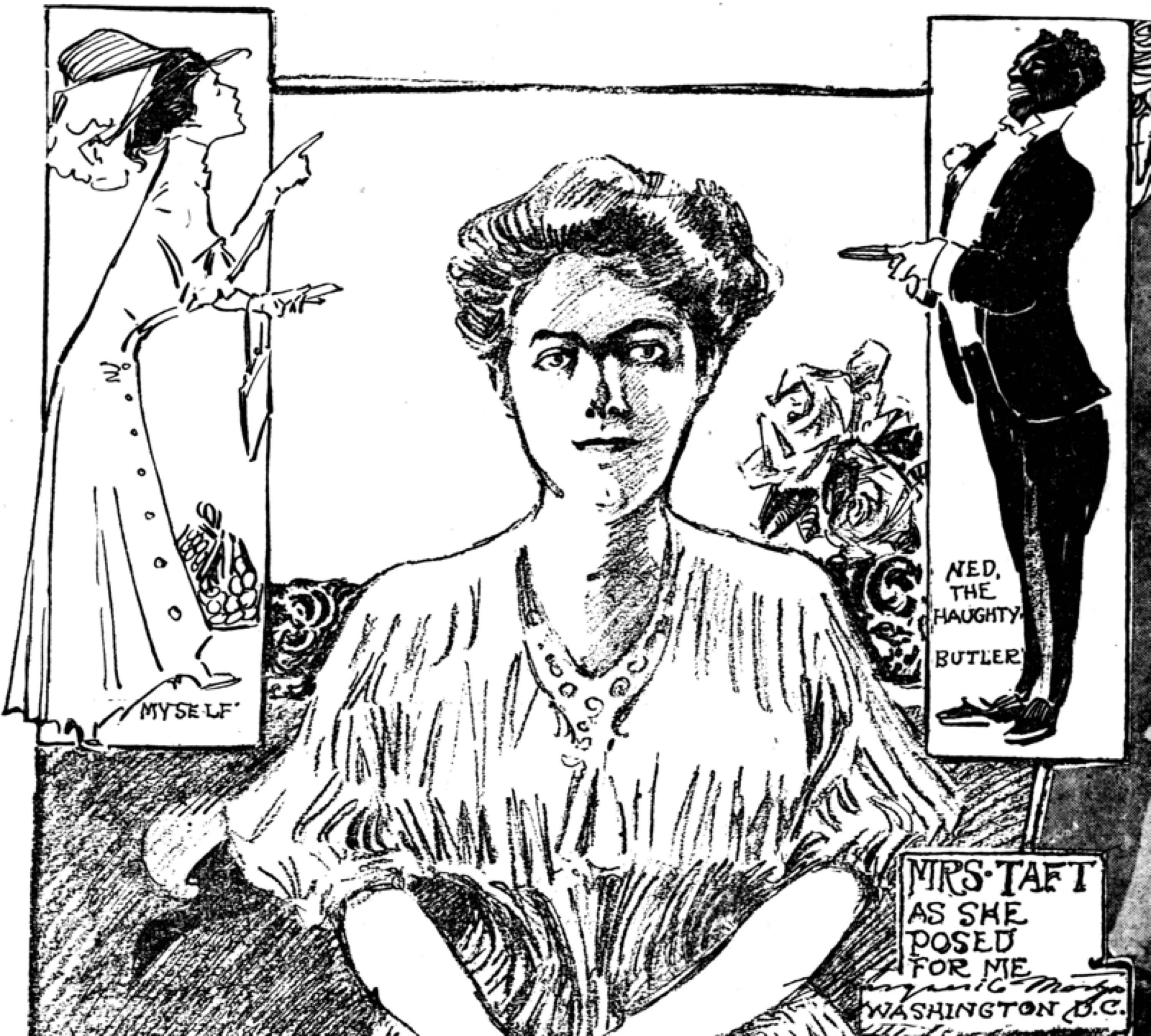
With Helen Herron Taft
and "Ned, the Haughty Butler,"
June 25, 1908

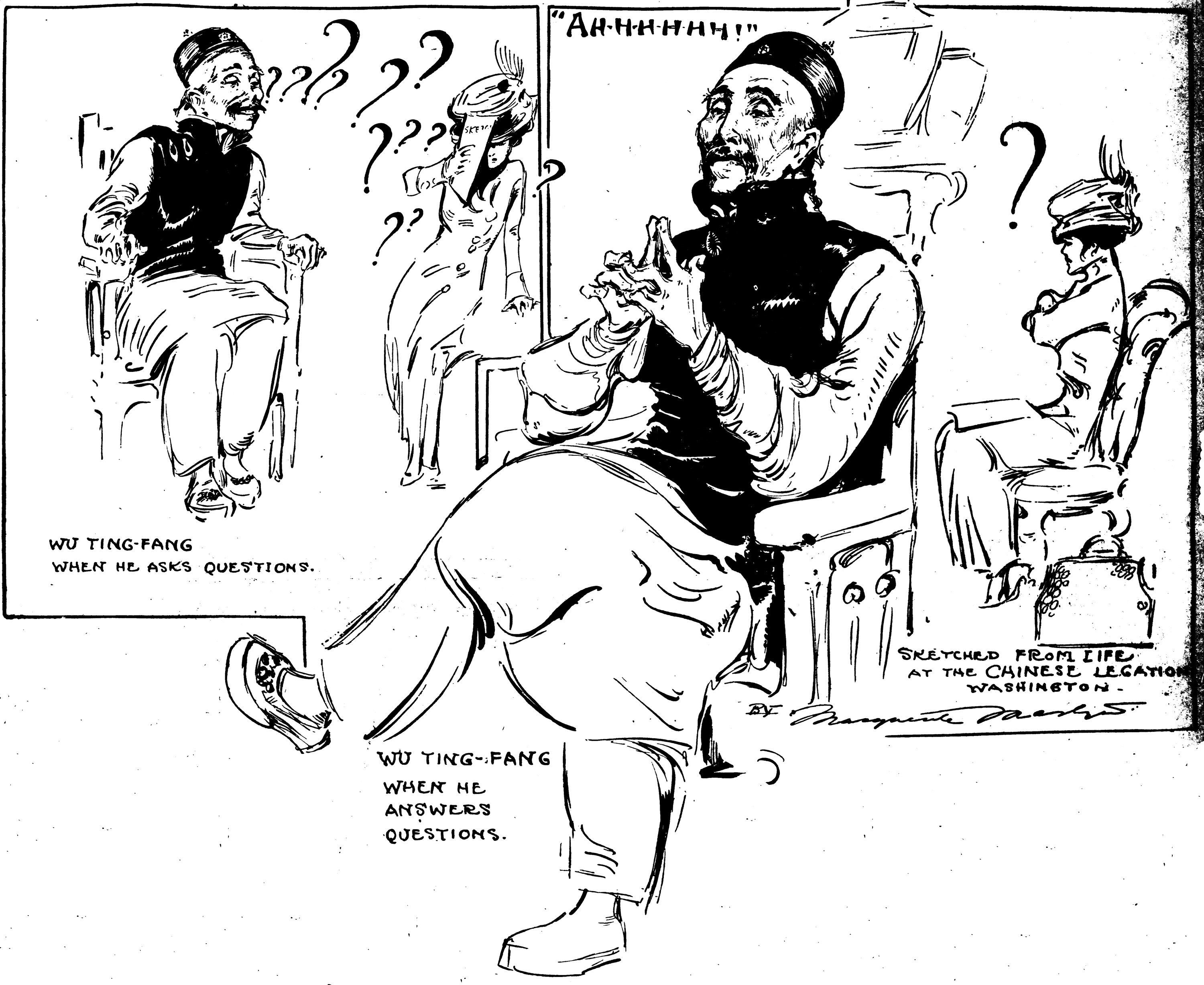
With Wu Ting Fang,
Chinese diplomat,
October 24, 1909

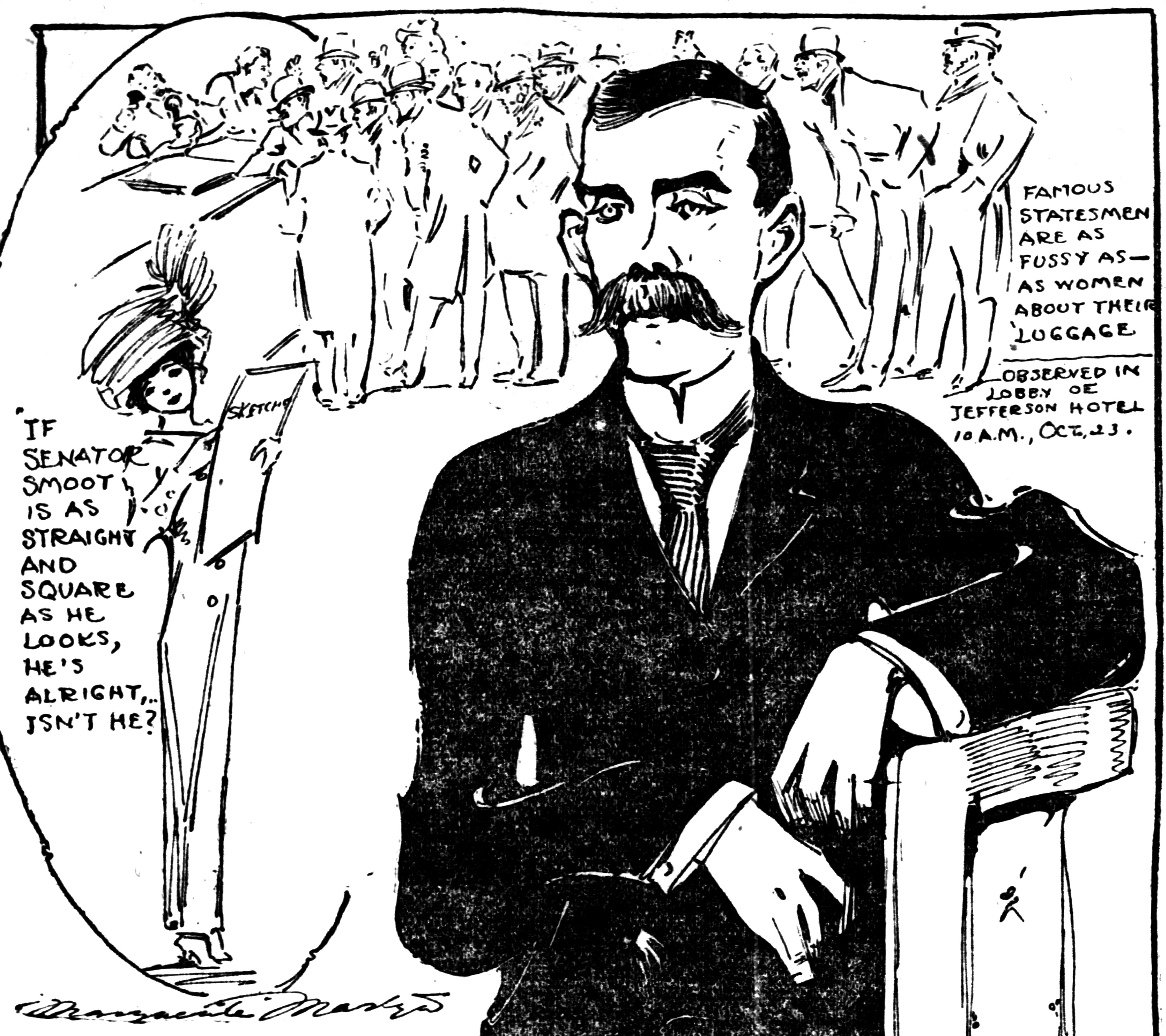
With Reed Smoot,
Senator from Utah,
October 26, 1909

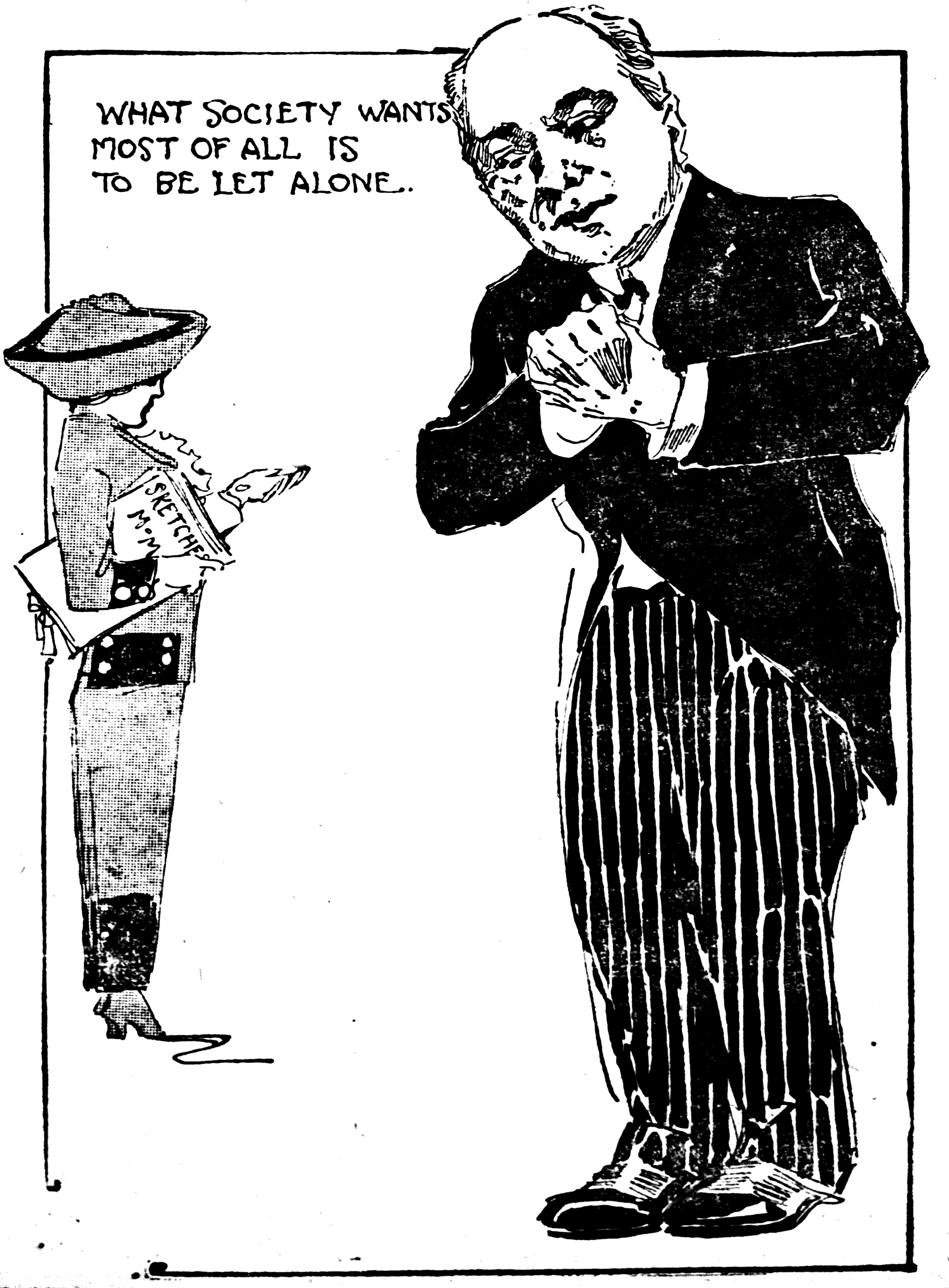
With Theophile Papin,
society arbiter,
December 18, 1910

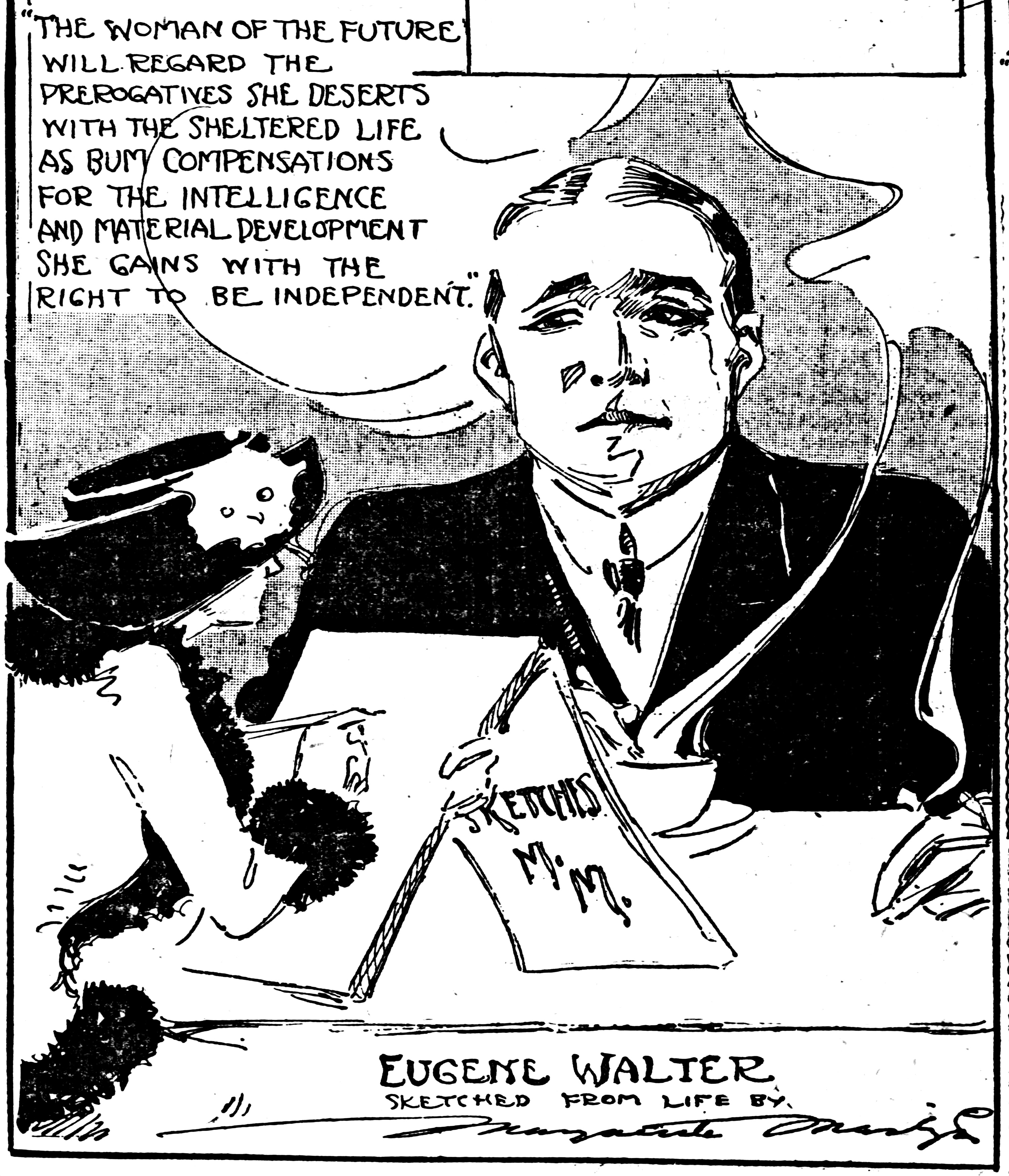
With playwright Eugene Walter, January 15, 1911

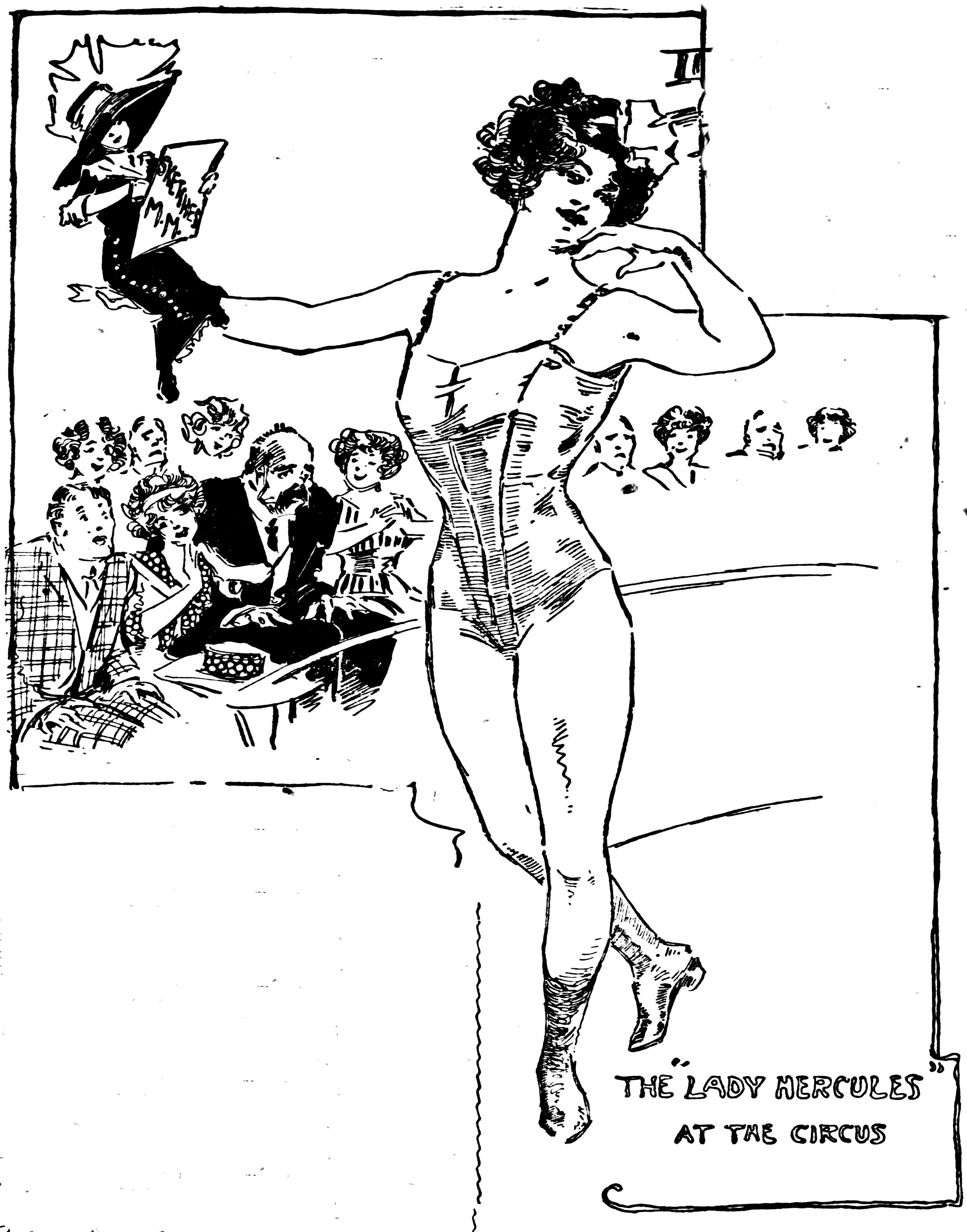
With strongwoman Katie Sandwina,
June 4, 1911

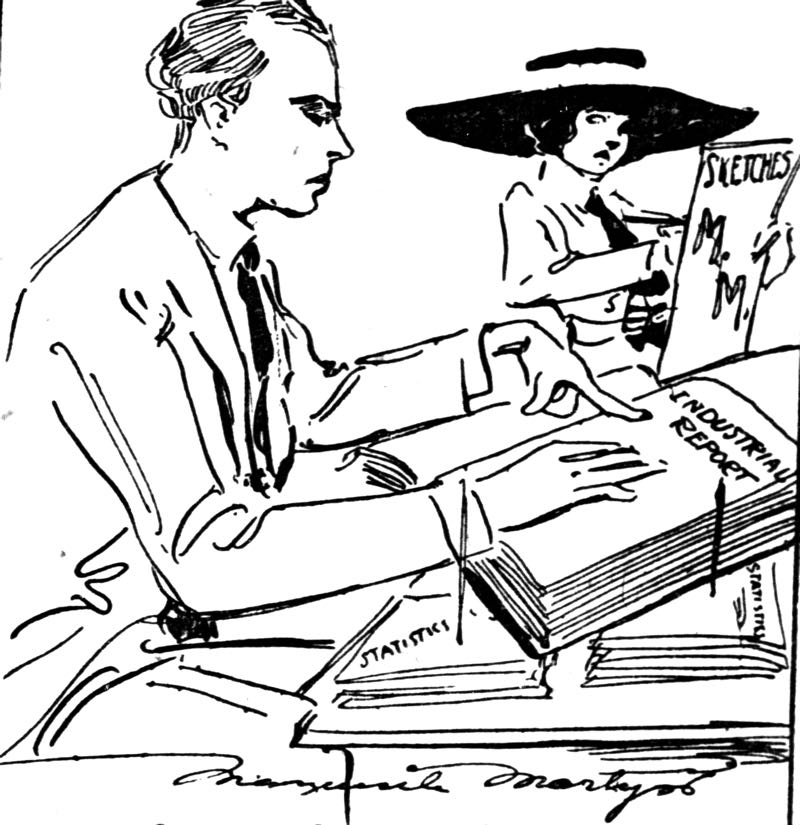
With Guilford Glynn,
Iola, Kansas, city commissioner,
August 13, 1911

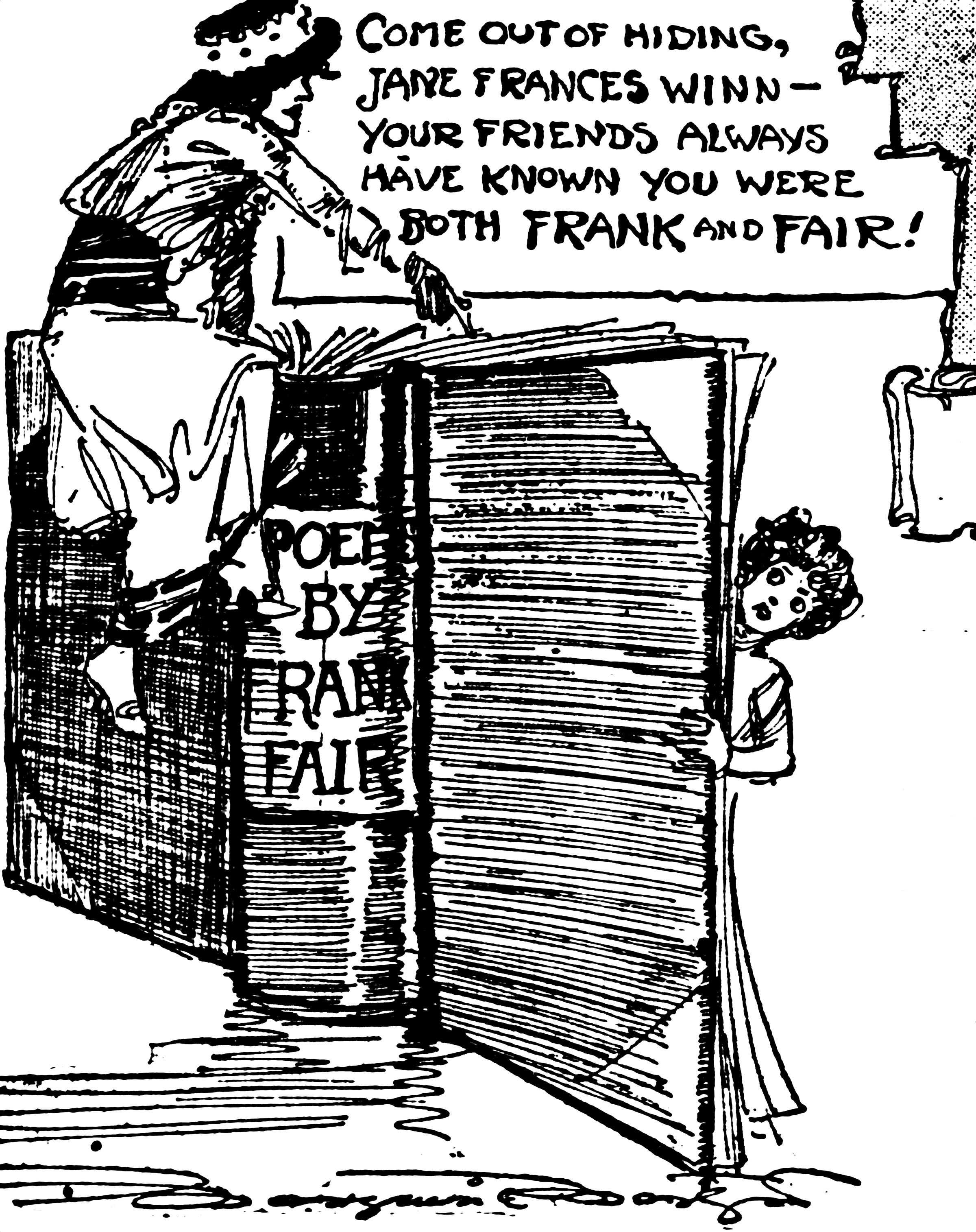
With Jane Frances Winn,
author,
August 13, 1914

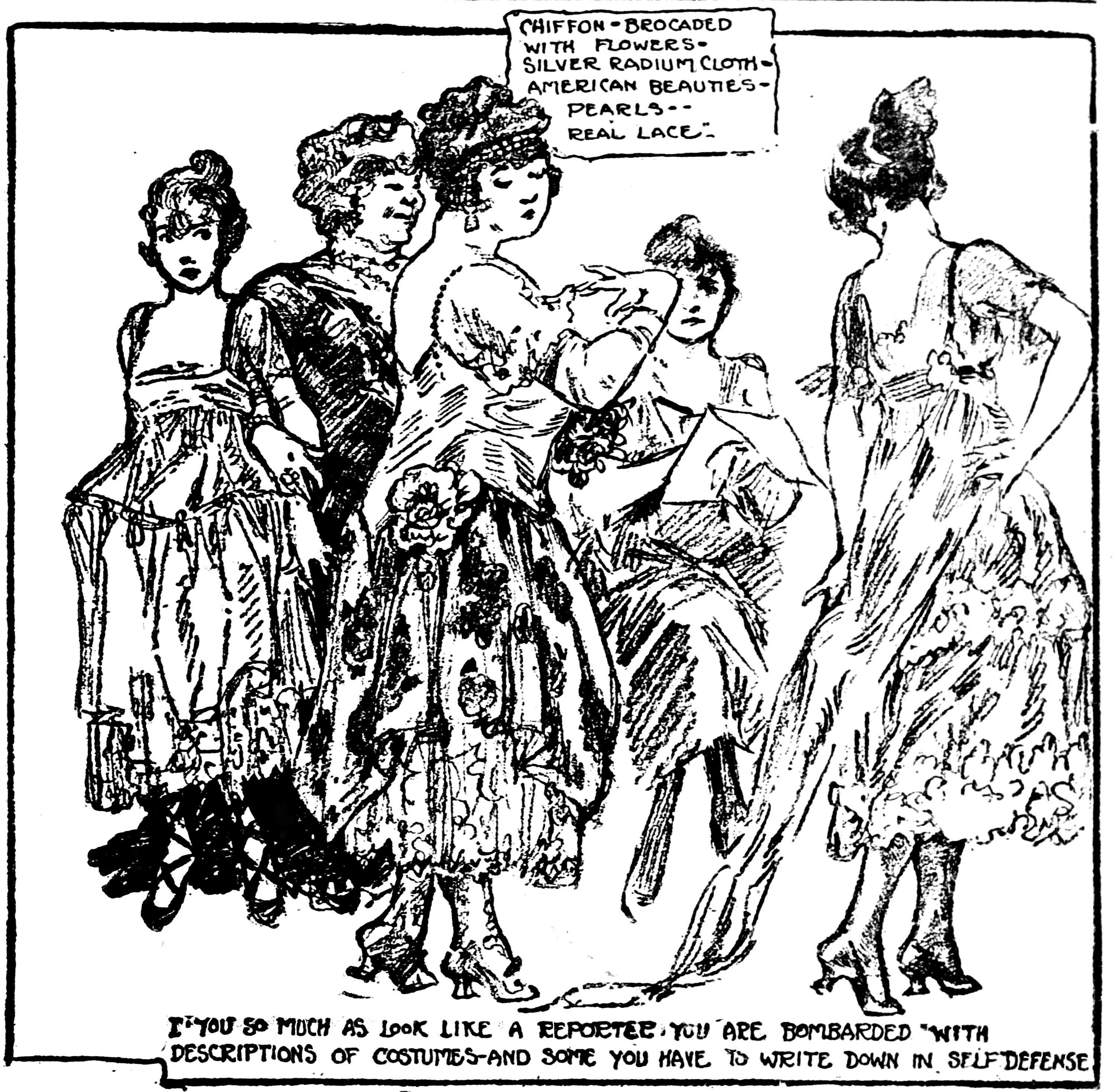
At the Veiled Prophet Ball, 1916

== See also ==
- List of sketches of notable people by Marguerite Martyn
