= Illinois's 23rd congressional district =

Former U.S. House district in Illinois

- Obsolete district
- Created: 1900
- Eliminated: 1980
- Years active: 1903-1983

The 23rd congressional district of Illinois was a congressional district for the United States House of Representatives in Illinois. It was eliminated as a result of the redistricting cycle after the 1980 census. It was last represented by Melvin Price who was redistricted into the 21st district.

== List of members representing the district ==
Member	Party	Years	Cong ress	Electoral history
District created March 4, 1903
Joseph B. Crowley (Robinson)	Democratic	March 4, 1903 – March 3, 1905	58th	Redistricted from the 19th district and re-elected in 1902. Retired.
Frank S. Dickson (Ramsey)	Republican	March 4, 1905 – March 3, 1907	59th	Elected in 1904. Lost re-election.
Martin D. Foster (Olney)	Democratic	March 4, 1907 – March 3, 1919	60th 61st 62nd 63rd 64th 65th	Elected in 1906. Re-elected in 1908. Re-elected in 1910. Re-elected in 1912. Re-elected in 1914. Re-elected in 1916. Lost re-election.
Edwin B. Brooks (Newton)	Republican	March 4, 1919 – March 3, 1923	66th 67th	Elected in 1918. Re-elected in 1920. Lost re-election.
William W. Arnold (Robinson)	Democratic	March 4, 1923 – September 16, 1935	68th 69th 70th 71st 72nd 73rd 74th	Elected in 1922. Re-elected in 1924. Re-elected in 1926. Re-elected in 1928. Re-elected in 1930. Re-elected in 1932. Re-elected in 1934. Resigned when appointed as a member of the US Board of Tax Appeals.
Vacant		September 16, 1935 – January 3, 1937	74th	
Laurence F. Arnold (Newton)	Democratic	January 3, 1937 – January 3, 1943	75th 76th 77th	Elected in 1936. Re-elected in 1938. Re-elected in 1940. Lost re-election.
Charles W. Vursell (Salem)	Republican	January 3, 1943 – January 3, 1949	78th 79th 80th	Elected in 1942. Re-elected in 1944. Re-elected in 1946. Redistricted to the 24th district.
Edward H. Jenison (Paris)	Republican	January 3, 1949 – January 3, 1953	81st 82nd	Redistricted from the 18th district and re-elected in 1948. Re-elected in 1950. Redistricted to the 21st district and lost re-election there.
Charles W. Vursell (Salem)	Republican	January 3, 1953 – January 3, 1959	83rd 84th 85th	Redistricted from the 24th district and re-elected in 1952. Re-elected in 1954. Re-elected in 1956. Lost re-election.
George E. Shipley (Olney)	Democratic	January 3, 1959 – January 3, 1973	86th 87th 88th 89th 90th 91st 92nd	Elected in 1958. Re-elected in 1960. Re-elected in 1962. Re-elected in 1964. Re-elected in 1966. Re-elected in 1968. Re-elected in 1970. Redistricted to the 22nd district.
Melvin Price (East St. Louis)	Democratic	January 3, 1973 – January 3, 1983	93rd 94th 95th 96th 97th	Redistricted from the 24th district and re-elected in 1972. Re-elected in 1974; Re-elected in 1976. Re-elected in 1978. Re-elected in 1980. Redistricted to the 21st district.
District eliminated January 3, 1983

== Electoral history ==
=== 1902 ===
1902 United States House of Representatives General Election
Party	Candidate	Votes	%
Democratic	Joseph B. Crowley	20,735	52.40
Republican	Hiram Gillmore VanSandt	17,557	44.37
Prohibition	William H. Boles	1,145	2.89
Populist	Dickson T. Harbison	130	0.33
Total votes		39,567	100.0

2/5

=== 1904 ===
1904 United States House of Representatives General Election
Party	Candidate	Votes	%	±%
Republican	Frank S. Dickson	21,931	47.65	+3.28%
Democratic	Martin D. Foster	21,123	45.90	−6.50%
Prohibition	William P. Habberton	2,404	5.22	+2.33%
Socialist	Joseph Palmer	563	1.22	N/A
Total votes		46,021	100.0	

=== 1906 ===
1906 United States House of Representatives General Election
Party	Candidate	Votes	%	±%
Democratic	Martin D. Foster	21,680	49.49	+3.59%
Republican	Frank S. Dickson (incumbent)	20,361	46.48	−1.17%
Prohibition	George B. Murray	1,384	3.16	−2.06%
Socialist	F. M. Riley	378	0.86	−0.36%
Total votes		43,803	100.0	

=== 1908 ===
1908 United States House of Representatives General Election
Party	Candidate	Votes	%	±%
Democratic	Martin D. Foster (incumbent)	28,181	53.58	+4.09%
Republican	Frank S. Dickson	23,772	45.20	−1.28%
Socialist	H. T. Davis	646	1.23	+0.37%
Total votes		52,599	100.0	

=== 1910 ===
1910 United States House of Representatives General Election
Party	Candidate	Votes	%	±%
Democratic	Martin D. Foster (incumbent)	23,535	53.68	+0.10%
Republican	J. H. Loy	18,230	41.58	−3.62%
Prohibition	D. R. Bebout	1,096	2.50	N/A
Socialist	Rikus A. Jeths	981	2.24	+1.01%
Total votes		43,842	100.0	

=== 1912 ===
1912 United States House of Representatives General Election
Party	Candidate	Votes	%	±%
Democratic	Martin D. Foster (incumbent)	26,938	52.40	−1.28%
Republican	Robert B. Clark	12,837	24.97	−16.61%
Progressive	George W. Jones	9,116	17.73	N/A
Socialist	John L. McKittrick	1,411	2.74	+0.50%
Prohibition	J. W. Honey	1,109	2.16	−0.34%
Total votes		51,411	100.0	

=== 1914 ===
1914 United States House of Representatives General Election
Party	Candidate	Votes	%	±%
Democratic	Martin D. Foster (incumbent)	24,414	53.14	+0.74%
Republican	John J. Bundy	18,036	39.25	+14.28%
Progressive	Logan B. Skipper	2,659	5.79	−11.94%
Socialist	Everett Ely	838	1.82	−0.92%
Total votes		45,947	100.0	

=== 1916 ===
1916 United States House of Representatives General Election
Party	Candidate	Votes	%	±%
Democratic	Martin D. Foster (incumbent)	28,805	52.91	−0.23%
Republican	Harry C. Ferriman	24,328	44.68	+5.43%
Socialist	John C. Wibel	1,087	2.00	+0.18%
Progressive	B. F. Moore	223	0.41	−5.38%
Write-in		1	0.00	N/A
Total votes		54,444	100.0	
