= Edward H. Jenison =

American politician and newspaper publisher

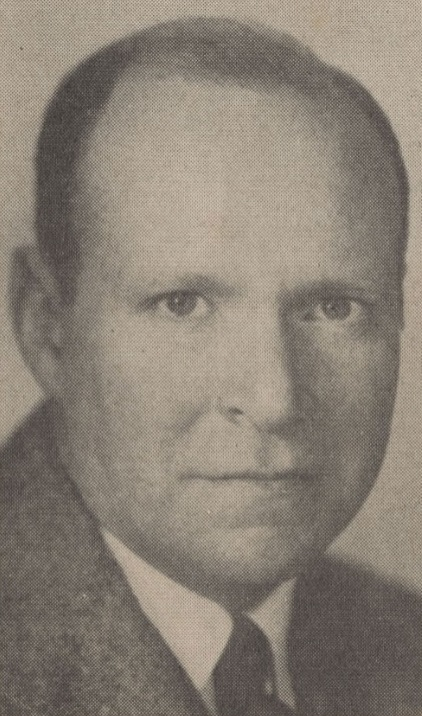
- From 1947's Pictorial Directory of the 80th Congress

Member of the U.S. House of Representatives from Illinois
- In office January 3, 1947 – January 3, 1953
- Preceded by: Jessie Sumner (18th); Charles W. Vursell (23rd)
- Succeeded by: Harold H. Velde (18th); Charles W. Vursell (23rd)
- Constituency: 18th district (1947-49); 23rd district (1949-53)

Personal details
- Born: July 27, 1907 Fond du Lac, Wisconsin, U.S.
- Died: June 24, 1996 (aged 88) Paris, Illinois, U.S.
- Party: Republican

Edward Halsey Jenison (July 27, 1907 – June 24, 1996) was a U.S. representative for three terms, Illinois state representative for one term, and newspaper publisher of the Daily Beacon-News of Paris, Illinois for 65 years.

Born in Fond du Lac, Wisconsin, Jenison attended the public schools and the University of Wisconsin–Madison. He engaged in newspaper work, from 1925 to 1937, and as a publisher, since 1938, of the Paris, Illinois Daily Beacon-News. He served as lieutenant commander in the United States Navy, attached to the Deputy Chief of Naval Operations for Air, with service in the Pacific and Atlantic Forces, from April 1943 to September 1946.

Jenison was elected as a Republican to the Eightieth Congress in 1946, replacing a four-term retiring Republican. After redistricting renumbered his district he was reelected in 1948 to the Eighty-first and Eighty-second Congresses. Redistricted again, Jenison was placed in the 21st District with an incumbent Democrat, Peter Mack, who defeated him in 1952. After a failed run in 1954 against Mack, he continued his public service on the Illinois State Board of Vocational Education (1953-60). With a new redistricting after the 1960 Census, Jenison made a final run for Congress in the 23rd District against another Democratic incumbent, George E. Shipley. Jenison’s service in the House was from January 3, 1947, to January 3, 1953.

Jenison appears to have had little impact in the House. He introduced no public bills and only one private bill. He introduced no resolutions and moved no floor amendments. In six years he participated in floor debate only ten times. His own perception of his House career was that it was nothing more than a “temporary public service.”

He resumed the publishing business, and was named "master editor" by the Southern Illinois Editorial Association in 1986. He served as delegate to the 1956 Republican National Convention and 1968 Republican National Convention. He served as director, Department of Finance, State of Illinois, from June 15, 1960, to January 20, 1961. He served as a member of the Illinois House of Representatives for one term from 1965 to 1966. Jenison also served in the Illinois House of Representatives from November 7, 1973 to the end of his term in 1974. He was appointed to replace William D. Cox who was convicted in the United States District Court for mail fraud and filing a false income tax return. He served as a delegate, Illinois Sixth Constitutional Convention from 1969 to 1970. He died on June 24, 1996; his funeral service was in Paris, Illinois.

U.S. House of Representatives
Preceded by Jessie Sumner	Member of the U.S. House of Representatives from Illinois's 18th congressional district 1947–1949	Succeeded by Harold H. Velde
Preceded by Charles W. Vursell	Member of the U.S. House of Representatives from Illinois's 23rd congressional district 1949–1953	Succeeded by Charles W. Vursell
