= Edwin B. Brooks =

American politician (1868–1933)

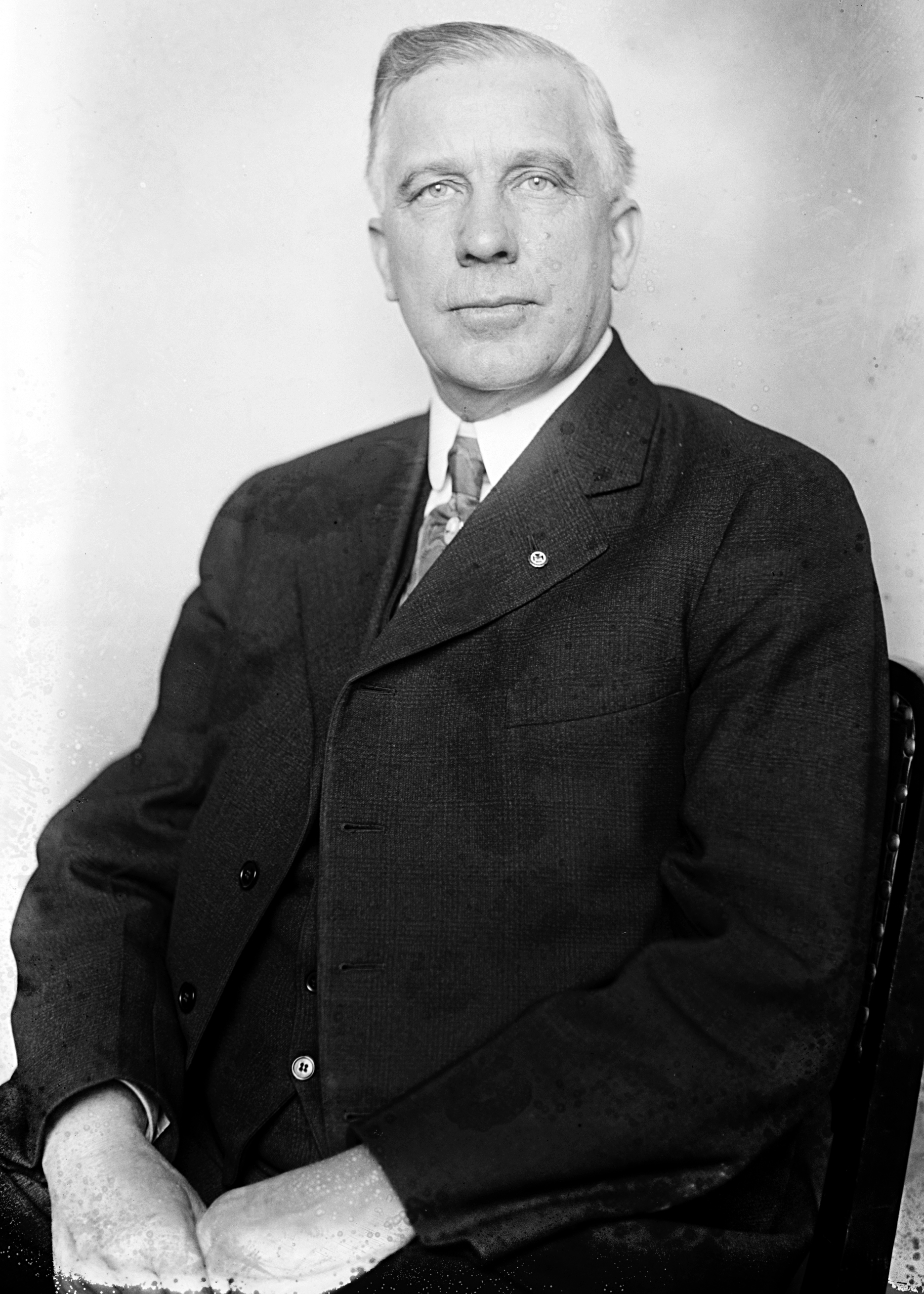

Member of the U.S. House of Representatives from Illinois's 23rd district
- In office March 4, 1919 – March 3, 1923
- Preceded by: Martin D. Foster
- Succeeded by: William W. Arnold

Personal details
- Born: September 20, 1868 Newton, Illinois, U.S.
- Died: September 18, 1933 (aged 64) Newton, Illinois, U.S.
- Party: Republican

Edwin Bruce Brooks (September 20, 1868 – September 18, 1933) was a U.S. representative from Illinois. He was the cousin of Edmund H. Hinshaw.

Born in Newton, Illinois, Brooks attended the public schools, and was graduated from Valparaiso (Indiana) University in 1892. Superintendent of schools at Newman 1894–1897, at Newton 1897–1903, at Greenville 1903–1905, and at Paris 1905–1912. He engaged in banking at Newton, Illinois from 1912 to 1914. County superintendent of schools of Jasper County 1914–1918.

Brooks was elected as a Republican to the Sixty-sixth and Sixty-seventh Congresses (March 4, 1919 – March 3, 1923). He was an unsuccessful candidate for reelection in 1922 to the Sixty-eighth Congress. Superintendent of charities for the State of Illinois in 1924–1930. He served as assistant attorney general 1930–1932. He died in Newton, Illinois, September 18, 1933. He was interred in River Side Cemetery.

U.S. House of Representatives
Preceded by Martin D. Foster	Member of the U.S. House of Representatives from Illinois's 23rd congressional district 1919-1923	Succeeded by William W. Arnold
