= Laurence F. Arnold =

American politician (1891–1966)

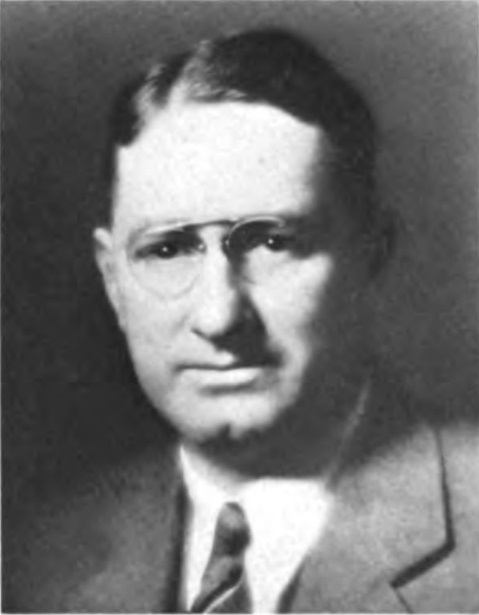
- From 1935's Blue Book of the State of Illinois

Member of the U.S. House of Representatives from Illinois's 23rd district
- In office January 3, 1937 – January 3, 1943
- Preceded by: William W. Arnold
- Succeeded by: Charles W. Vursell

Member of the Illinois House of Representatives
- In office 1923-1927; 1933-1937

Personal details
- Born: June 8, 1891 Newton, Illinois, U.S.
- Died: December 6, 1966 (aged 75) Newton, Illinois, U.S.
- Party: Democratic

Laurence Fletcher Arnold (June 8, 1891 – December 6, 1966) was a U.S. representative from Illinois.

Born in Newton, Illinois, Arnold attended the public and high schools of his native city and the University of Chicago, Chicago, Illinois. He studied law. He engaged in banking and in the wholesale hay and grain business at Newton, Illinois, in 1916. He served in the State house of representatives from 1923 to 1927 and from 1933 to 1937. He served as delegate to the Democratic National Convention in New York in 1924.

Arnold was elected as a Democrat to the Seventy-fifth, Seventy-sixth, and Seventy-seventh Congresses (January 3, 1937 – January 3, 1943). He was an unsuccessful candidate for reelection in 1942 to the Seventy-eighth Congress and for election in 1950 to the Eighty-second Congress. He resumed former business interests. He served as president of Peoples State Bank. He died in Newton, Illinois on December 6, 1966. He was interred in Westlawn Memorial Park Cemetery.

U.S. House of Representatives
Preceded by William W. Arnold	Member of the U.S. House of Representatives from Illinois's 23rd congressional district 1937-1943	Succeeded by Charles W. Vursell
