= Judge Love =

Judge Love may refer to:

- James M. Love (1820–1891), judge of the United States District Courts for the District of Iowa and the Southern District of Iowa
- John Love (judge) (fl. 1990s–2020s), magistrate judge of the United States District Court for the Eastern District of Texas
- William D. Love (1859–1933), judge of the United States Board of Tax Appeals
