= William W. Arnold =

American politician and jurist

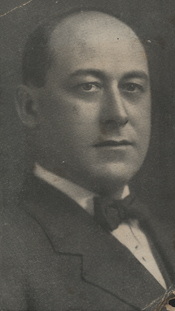

Judge of the United States Tax Court
- In office September 16, 1935 – June 30, 1950
- Preceded by: Jed C. Adams
- Succeeded by: Stephen E. Rice

Member of the U.S. House of Representatives from Illinois's 23rd district
- In office March 4, 1923 – September 16, 1935
- Preceded by: Edwin B. Brooks
- Succeeded by: Laurence F. Arnold

Personal details
- Born: William Wright Arnold; October 14, 1877 Oblong, Illinois, U.S.
- Died: November 23, 1957 (aged 80) Robinson, Illinois, U.S.
- Party: Democratic

William Wright Arnold (October 14, 1877 – November 23, 1957) was an American politician and jurist, serving as a U.S. representative from Illinois and a judge of the United States Tax Court.

== Life and career ==
Born in Oblong, Illinois, Arnold attended the country schools of his native county and Austin College, Effingham, Illinois. He graduated from the law department of the University of Illinois in 1901. He was admitted to the bar the same year and commenced the practice of law in Robinson, Illinois. He was continuously engaged in the practice of his chosen profession until elected to Congress.

Arnold was elected as a Democrat to the Sixty-eighth and to the six succeeding Congresses and served from March 4, 1923, until his resignation, effective September 16, 1935, having been appointed July 29, 1935, a member of the United States Board of Tax Appeals (which became the United States Tax Court during his service). He was reappointed in 1944 and served until his retirement June 30, 1950. He owned and operated two large farms. He served as director of the Second National Bank, Farmers and Producers Bank, and the First National Bank of Robinson.

== Death ==
He died in Robinson, Illinois on November 23, 1957. He was interred in New Cemetery.

U.S. House of Representatives
Preceded by Edwin B. Brooks	Member of the U.S. House of Representatives from Illinois's 23rd congressional district March 4, 1923 - September 16, 1935	Succeeded by Laurence F. Arnold
