= William L. Springer =

American politician (1909–1992)

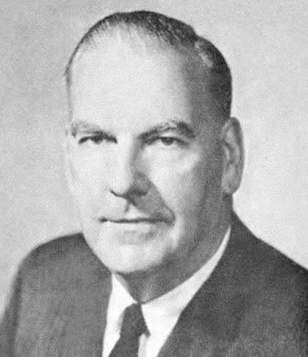

Member of the U.S. House of Representatives from Illinois's 22nd district
- In office January 3, 1951 – January 3, 1973
- Preceded by: Rolla C. McMillen
- Succeeded by: Edward Rell Madigan (redistricting)

Personal details
- Born: April 12, 1909 Sullivan, Indiana, U.S.
- Died: September 20, 1992 (aged 83) Champaign, Illinois, U.S.
- Party: Republican

William Lee Springer (April 12, 1909 – September 20, 1992) was a U.S. representative from Illinois.

Born in Sullivan, Indiana, Springer attended the public schools and Sullivan and Culver Military Academy at Culver, Indiana. DePauw University, Greencastle, Indiana, B.A., 1931. He graduated from the law school of the University of Illinois, LL.B., in 1935. He was admitted to the bar in 1935 and commenced the practice of law in 1936 in Champaign, Illinois. He was the state's attorney of Champaign County, Illinois from 1940 to 1942. He served in the United States Navy from March 1942 as an officer, with nineteen months' foreign duty, until discharged as a lieutenant in the Naval Reserve on September 22, 1945. He was a county judge in Champaign County from 1946 to 1950.

Springer was elected as a Republican to the Eighty-second and to the ten succeeding Congresses (January 3, 1951 – January 3, 1973). He was not a candidate for reelection in 1972 to the Ninety-third Congress. He served as a member of the Federal Power Commission, May 1973 – December 1975. He served as a member of the Federal Election Commission from May 1976 to March 1979. Springer voted in favor of the Civil Rights Acts of 1957, 1960, 1964, and 1968, as well as the 24th Amendment to the U.S. Constitution and the Voting Rights Act of 1965. He was a resident of Champaign, Illinois until his death on September 20, 1992.

U.S. House of Representatives
Preceded by Rolla C. McMillen	Member of the U.S. House of Representatives from Illinois's 22nd congressional district 1951-1973	Succeeded by George E. Shipley
