= Jed Adams =

Jed Adams may refer to:

- Jed C. Adams (1876–1935), American federal judge
- Jed Adams (footballer) (born 2004), Australian rules footballer
