= Illinois's 19th congressional district =

Former U.S. House district in Illinois

- Obsolete district
- Created: 1870
- Eliminated: 2010
- Years active: 1873-2013

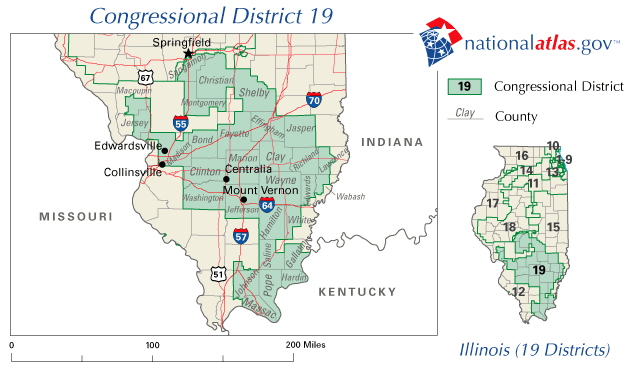
The district from 2003 to 2013

The 19th congressional district of Illinois was a congressional district in Illinois. It was eliminated as a result of the 2010 US census, as population growth in Illinois was slower compared to other states. The district became obsolete for 2013's 113th Congress. It was last represented by Republican John Shimkus, who was redistricted to the 15th district.

In its last iteration, the district encompassed a large stretch of rural Southern Illinois, part of Springfield and a portion of the "Metro-East" area (the Illinois side of the Greater St. Louis, Missouri region).

== List of members representing the district ==
Member	Party	Years	Cong ress	Electoral history
District created March 4, 1873
Samuel S. Marshall (McLeansboro)	Democratic	March 4, 1873 – March 3, 1875	43rd	Redistricted from the 11th district and re-elected in 1872. Lost re-election.
William B. Anderson (Elk Prairie)	Independent	March 4, 1875 – March 3, 1877	44th	Elected in 1874. Lost re-election.
Richard W. Townshend (Shawneetown)	Democratic	March 4, 1877 – March 9, 1889	45th 46th 47th 48th 49th 50th 51st	Elected in 1876. Re-elected in 1878. Re-elected in 1880. Re-elected in 1882. Re-elected in 1884. Re-elected in 1886. Re-elected in 1888. Died.
Vacant		March 9, 1889 – December 2, 1889	51st	
James R. Williams (Carmi)	Democratic	December 2, 1889 – March 3, 1895	51st 52nd 53rd	Elected in 1889 to finish Townshend's term. Re-elected in 1890. Re-elected in 1892. Redistricted to the 20th district and lost re-election there.
Benson Wood (Effingham)	Republican	March 4, 1895 – March 3, 1897	54th	Elected in 1894. Lost re-election.
Andrew J. Hunter (Paris)	Democratic	March 4, 1897 – March 3, 1899	55th	Elected in 1896. Retired.
Joseph B. Crowley (Robinson)	Democratic	March 4, 1899 – March 3, 1903	56th 57th	Elected in 1898. Re-elected in 1900. Redistricted to the 23rd district.
Vespasian Warner (Clinton)	Republican	March 4, 1903 – March 3, 1905	58th	Redistricted from the 13th district and re-elected in 1902. Retired to run for Governor of Illinois.
William B. McKinley (Champaign)	Republican	March 4, 1905 – March 3, 1913	59th 60th 61st 62nd	Elected in 1904. Re-elected in 1906. Re-elected in 1908. Re-elected in 1910. Lost re-election.
Charles M. Borchers (Decatur)	Democratic	March 4, 1913 – March 3, 1915	63rd	Elected in 1912. Lost re-election.
William B. McKinley (Champaign)	Republican	March 4, 1915 – March 3, 1921	64th 65th 66th	Elected in 1914. Re-elected in 1916. Re-elected in 1918. Retired to run for U.S. Senator.
Allen F. Moore (Monticello)	Republican	March 4, 1921 – March 3, 1925	67th 68th	Elected in 1920. Re-elected in 1922. Retired.
Charles Adkins (Decatur)	Republican	March 4, 1925 – March 3, 1933	69th 70th 71st 72nd	Elected in 1924. Re-elected in 1926. Re-elected in 1928. Re-elected in 1930. Lost re-election.
Donald C. Dobbins (Champaign)	Democratic	March 4, 1933 – January 3, 1937	73rd 74th	Elected in 1932. Re-elected in 1934. Retired.
Hugh M. Rigney (Arthur)	Democratic	January 3, 1937 – January 3, 1939	75th	Elected in 1936. Lost re-election.
William H. Wheat (Rantoul)	Republican	January 3, 1939 – January 16, 1944	76th 77th 78th	Elected in 1938. Re-elected in 1940. Re-elected in 1942. Died.
Vacant		January 16, 1944 – June 13, 1944	78th	
Rolla C. McMillen (Decatur)	Republican	June 13, 1944 – January 3, 1949	78th 79th 80th	Elected in 1944 to finish Wheat's term. Re-elected in 1944. Re-elected in 1946. Redistricted to the 22nd district.
Robert B. Chiperfield (Canton)	Republican	January 3, 1949 – January 3, 1963	81st 82nd 83rd 84th 85th 86th 87th	Redistricted from the 15th district and re-elected in 1948. Re-elected in 1950. Re-elected in 1952. Re-elected in 1954. Re-elected in 1956. Re-elected in 1958. Re-elected in 1960. Retired.
Robert T. McLoskey (Monmouth)	Republican	January 3, 1963 – January 3, 1965	88th	Elected in 1962. Lost re-election.
Gale Schisler (London Mills)	Democratic	January 3, 1965 – January 3, 1967	89th	Elected in 1964. Lost re-election.
Tom Railsback (Moline)	Republican	January 3, 1967 – January 3, 1983	90th 91st 92nd 93rd 94th 95th 96th 97th	Elected in 1966. Re-elected in 1968. Re-elected in 1970. Re-elected in 1972. Re-elected in 1974; Re-elected in 1976. Re-elected in 1978. Re-elected in 1980. Redistricted to the 17th district and lost renomination there.
Dan Crane (Danville)	Republican	January 3, 1983 – January 3, 1985	98th	Redistricted from the 22nd district and re-elected in 1982. Lost re-election.
Terry L. Bruce (Olney)	Democratic	January 3, 1985 – January 3, 1993	99th 100th 101st 102nd	Elected in 1984. Re-elected in 1986. Re-elected in 1988. Re-elected in 1990. Lost renomination.
Glenn Poshard (Marion)	Democratic	January 3, 1993 – January 3, 1999	103rd 104th 105th	Redistricted from the 22nd district and re-elected in 1992. Re-elected in 1994. Re-elected in 1996. Retired to run for Governor of Illinois.
David D. Phelps (Eldorado)	Democratic	January 3, 1999 – January 3, 2003	106th 107th	Elected in 1998. Re-elected in 2000. Lost re-election.
John Shimkus (Collinsville)	Republican	January 3, 2003 – January 3, 2013	108th 109th 110th 111th 112th	Redistricted from the 20th district and re-elected in 2002. Re-elected in 2004. Re-elected in 2006. Re-elected in 2008. Re-elected in 2010. Redistricted to the 15th district.
District eliminated January 3, 2013

== Recent election results in statewide races ==
The district had a Cook Partisan Voting Index score of "R+9."

Year	Office	Results
2000	President	Bush 55 – 41%
2004	President	Bush 61 – 39%
2008	President	McCain 54 – 44%
