= Martin D. Foster =

American politician (1861–1919)

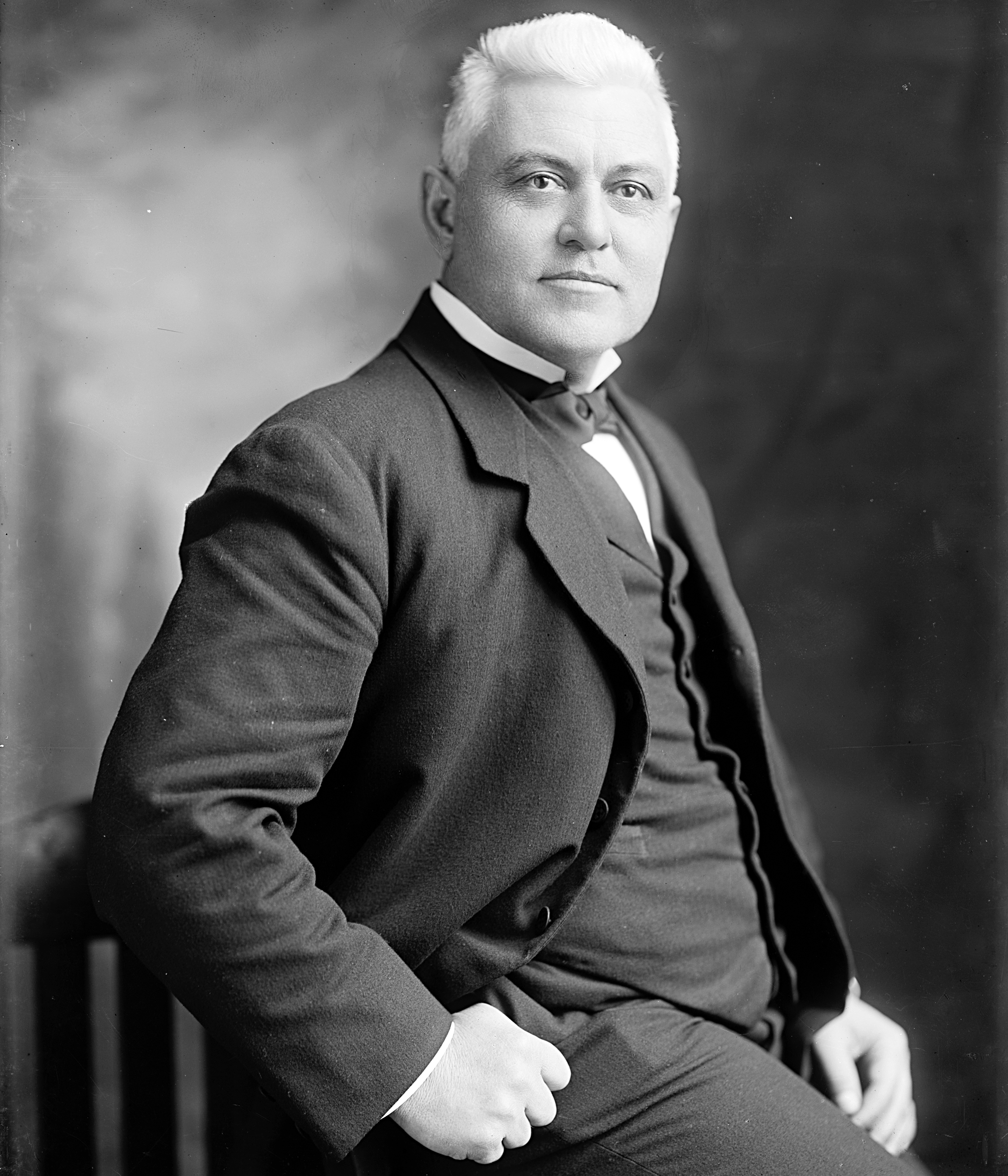
- Foster, 1905–1919

Member of the U.S. House of Representatives from Illinois's 23rd district
- In office March 4, 1907 – March 3, 1919
- Preceded by: Frank S. Dickson
- Succeeded by: Edwin B. Brooks

Personal details
- Born: September 3, 1861 West Salem, Illinois, U.S.
- Died: October 20, 1919 (aged 58) Olney, Illinois, U.S.
- Party: Democratic

Martin David Foster (September 3, 1861 – October 20, 1919) was a U.S. representative from Illinois.

Born near West Salem, Illinois, Foster attended the public schools and Eureka College (Illinois). He was graduated from the Eclectic Medical Institute, Cincinnati, Ohio, in 1882 and from the Hahnemann Medical College, Chicago, Illinois, in 1884. He commenced the practice of medicine in Olney, Illinois, in 1884. He served as a member of a board of United States examining surgeons in 1885–1889, and again from 1893 to 1897. He served as mayor of Olney, Illinois, in 1895 and 1902.

Foster was elected as a Democrat to the Sixtieth and to the five succeeding Congresses (March 4, 1907 – March 3, 1919). He served as chairman of the Committee on Mines and Mining (Sixty-second through Sixty-fifth Congresses). He was an unsuccessful candidate for reelection in 1918. He engaged in the practice of medicine until his death in Olney, Illinois, October 20, 1919. He was interred in Haven Hill Cemetery.

U.S. House of Representatives
Preceded by Frank S. Dickson	Member of the U.S. House of Representatives from Illinois's 23rd congressional district 1907-1919	Succeeded by Edwin B. Brooks
