= Benson Wood =

American politician

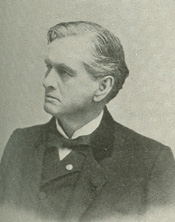

Member of the U.S. House of Representatives from Illinois's 19th district
- In office March 4, 1895 – March 3, 1897
- Preceded by: James R. Williams
- Succeeded by: Andrew J. Hunter

Member of the Illinois Senate
- In office 1872

Personal details
- Born: March 31, 1839 Bridgewater Township, Pennsylvania, U.S.
- Died: August 27, 1915 (aged 76) Effingham, Illinois, U.S.
- Party: Republican Party

Benson Wood (March 31, 1839 – August 27, 1915) was a U.S. representative from Illinois.

== Early life and military service ==
Born near Bridgewater, Susquehanna, Pennsylvania, Wood attended the common schools, Montrose (Pennsylvania) Academy, and Wyoming (Pennsylvania) Seminary. He moved to Illinois in 1859 and for two years was principal of a village school in Lee County. During the Civil War, he enlisted as first lieutenant of Company C, thirty-fourth Regiment, Illinois Volunteer Infantry, September 7, 1861. He was promoted to captain May 1, 1862. He was honorably discharged on January 29, 1863.

== Legal career and entry into politics ==
Wood graduated from the Union College of Law in 1864. He was admitted to the bar in 1864 and engaged in the practice of law in Effingham, Illinois. He served as member of the Illinois House of Representatives in 1872, and was a delegate to the Republican National Convention in 1876 and 1888. He served as mayor of Effingham, Illinois 1881–1883.

== Congressional career ==
Wood was elected as a Republican to the Fifty-fourth Congress (March 4, 1895 – March 3, 1897). He was an unsuccessful candidate for reelection in 1896 to the Fifty-fifth Congress. He resumed the practice of law in Effingham, Illinois. He served as president of the Effingham State Bank 1903–1912, and chairman of the board of directors 1912–1915. He died in Effingham on August 27, 1915. He was interred in Oakridge Cemetery.

U.S. House of Representatives
| Preceded by James R. Williams | Member of the U.S. House of Representatives from Illinois's 19th congressional district 1895-1897 | Succeeded by Andrew J. Hunter |
