= William H. Wheat =

American politician

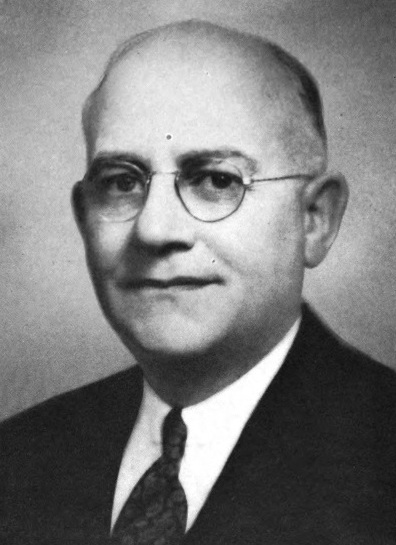
- Frontispiece of 1946's William Howard Wheat, Late a Representative from Illinois

Member of the U.S. House of Representatives from Illinois's 19th district
- In office January 3, 1939 – January 16, 1944
- Preceded by: Hugh M. Rigney
- Succeeded by: Rolla C. McMillen

Personal details
- Born: February 19, 1879 Kahoka, Missouri, U.S.
- Died: January 16, 1944 (aged 64) Washington, D.C., U.S.
- Party: Republican

William Howard Wheat (February 19, 1879 – January 16, 1944) was a U.S. representative from Illinois.

Born in Kahoka, Missouri, Wheat attended the public schools of Brookfield and Chillicothe, Missouri, and Chaddock College and Gem City Business College, Quincy, Illinois. He served as clerk in clothing stores in Quincy and Bloomington, Illinois. He moved to Thomasboro, Illinois, in 1900, becoming engaged as bookkeeper and later cashier of a bank. In 1909 moved to Rantoul, Illinois, and served as vice president and president of banking institutions. He was also interested in agriculture. He was school treasurer of Rantoul, Illinois, for a number of years. He was an unsuccessful candidate for election to the Seventy-fifth Congress.

Wheat was elected as a Republican to the Seventy-sixth, Seventy-seventh, and Seventy-eighth Congresses and served from January 3, 1939, until his death in Washington, D.C., January 16, 1944. He was interred in Maplewood Cemetery, Rantoul, Illinois.

== See also ==
- List of members of the United States Congress who died in office (1900–1949)

U.S. House of Representatives
Preceded by Hugh M. Rigney	Member of the U.S. House of Representatives from Illinois's 19th congressional district January 3, 1939 - January 16, 1944	Succeeded by Rolla C. McMillen
