= Rolla C. McMillen =

American politician (1880–1961)

Rolla McMillen
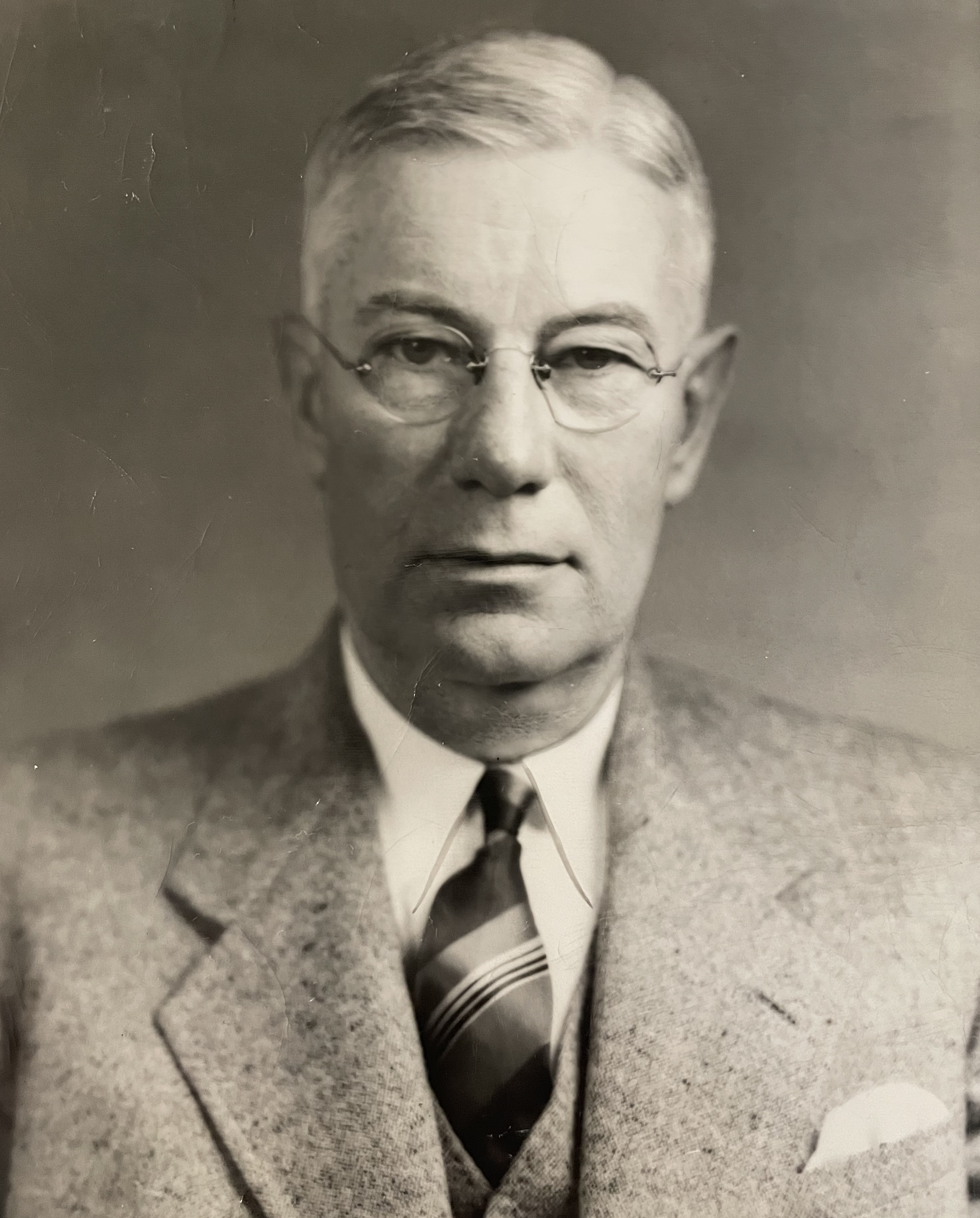
- 1948 photo by Harris & Ewing (Washington, DC)

Member of the U.S. House of Representatives from Illinois
- In office June 13, 1944 – January 3, 1951
- Preceded by: William H. Wheat (19th); Melvin Price (22nd)
- Succeeded by: Robert B. Chiperfield (19th); William L. Springer (22nd)
- Constituency: 19th district (1944-49); 22nd district (1949-51)

Personal details
- Born: Rolla Coral McMillen; October 5, 1880 near Monticello, Illinois, U.S.
- Died: May 6, 1961 (aged 80) Evanston, Illinois, U.S.
- Education: University of Illinois; University of Michigan Law School
- Occupation: Lawyer

Rolla Coral McMillen (October 5, 1880 – May 6, 1961) was a U.S. representative from Illinois.

Born near Monticello, Illinois, McMillen attended the public schools of Monticello, Illinois (Monticello High School), and the University of Illinois. He graduated from the University of Michigan Law School in 1906. He was admitted to the bar the same year and commenced practice in Decatur, Illinois with Clark A. McMillen, to whom he was not related, in the firm of McMillen & McMillen. He served as a delegate to the Republican National Convention in 1940. He served as member of State housing board 1940–1944.

McMillen was elected as a Republican to the Seventy-eighth Congress to fill the vacancy caused by the death of William H. Wheat. He was reelected to the Seventy-ninth, Eightieth, and Eighty-first Congresses, and served from June 13, 1944, to January 3, 1951. He was not a candidate for renomination in 1950. He was the father of a former judge of the United States District Court for the Northern District of Illinois Thomas Roberts McMillen.

He died in Evanston, Illinois, May 6, 1961. He was interred in Greenwood Cemetery, Decatur, Illinois.

U.S. House of Representatives
Preceded by William H. Wheat	Member of the U.S. House of Representatives from Illinois's 19th congressional district June 13, 1944 - January 3, 1949	Succeeded by Robert B. Chiperfield
Preceded by Melvin Price	Member of the U.S. House of Representatives from Illinois's 22nd congressional district January 3, 1949 - January 3, 1951	Succeeded by William L. Springer
