= Allen F. Moore =

American politician

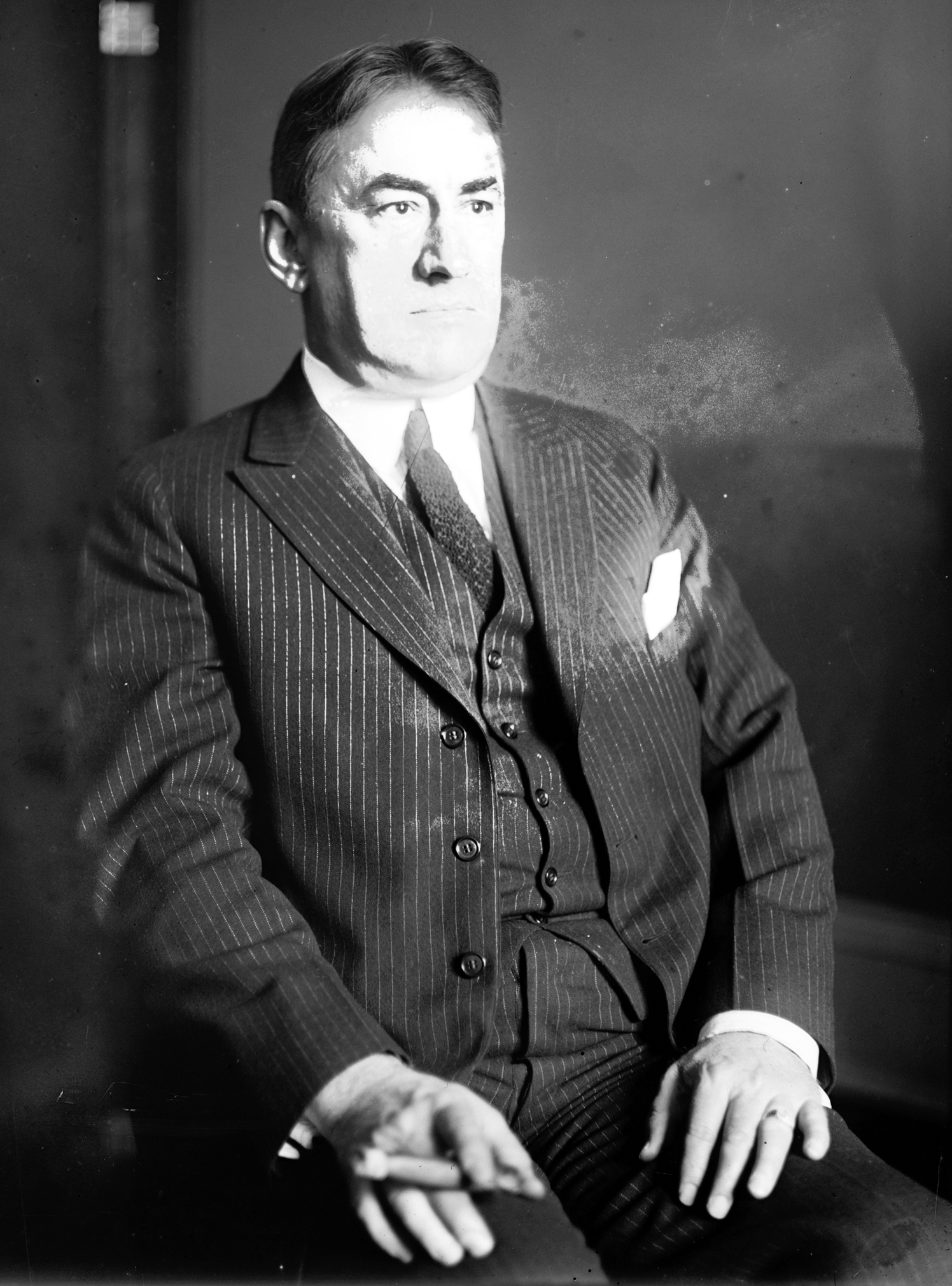
- Moore c. 1921–22

Member of the U.S. House of Representatives from Illinois's 19th district
- In office March 4, 1921 – March 3, 1925
- Preceded by: William B. McKinley
- Succeeded by: Charles Adkins

Personal details
- Born: September 30, 1869 St. Charles Township, Illinois
- Died: August 18, 1945 (aged 75) San Antonio, Texas
- Party: Republican

Allen Francis Moore (September 30, 1869 – August 18, 1945) was a U.S. representative from Illinois.

Moore was born in St. Charles, Kane County, Illinois. In 1870, he moved to Piatt County with his parents, who settled in Monticello, Illinois, where he attended the common schools. He graduated from the Monticello High School in 1886 and from Lombard College, Galesburg, Illinois, in 1889. He engaged in the manufacture of proprietary medicines and later in banking. He served as trustee of the University of Illinois from 1908 to 1914.

Moore was elected as a Republican to the Sixty-seventh and Sixty-eighth Congresses (March 4, 1921 – March 3, 1925). He declined to be a candidate for reelection in 1924 to the Sixty-ninth Congress. He served as member of the Republican National Committee in 1925, and resumed his former business pursuits in Monticello, Illinois. He moved to San Antonio, Texas, in 1939 and engaged in oil development until his death there August 18, 1945. He was interred in Monticello Cemetery, Monticello, Illinois.

== Notes ==
- United States Congress. "Allen F. Moore (id: M000890)". Biographical Directory of the United States Congress.

U.S. House of Representatives
Preceded by William B. McKinley	Member of the U.S. House of Representatives from Illinois's 19th congressional district 1921-1925	Succeeded by Charles Adkins
