= Jed C. Adams =

American judge (1876–1935)

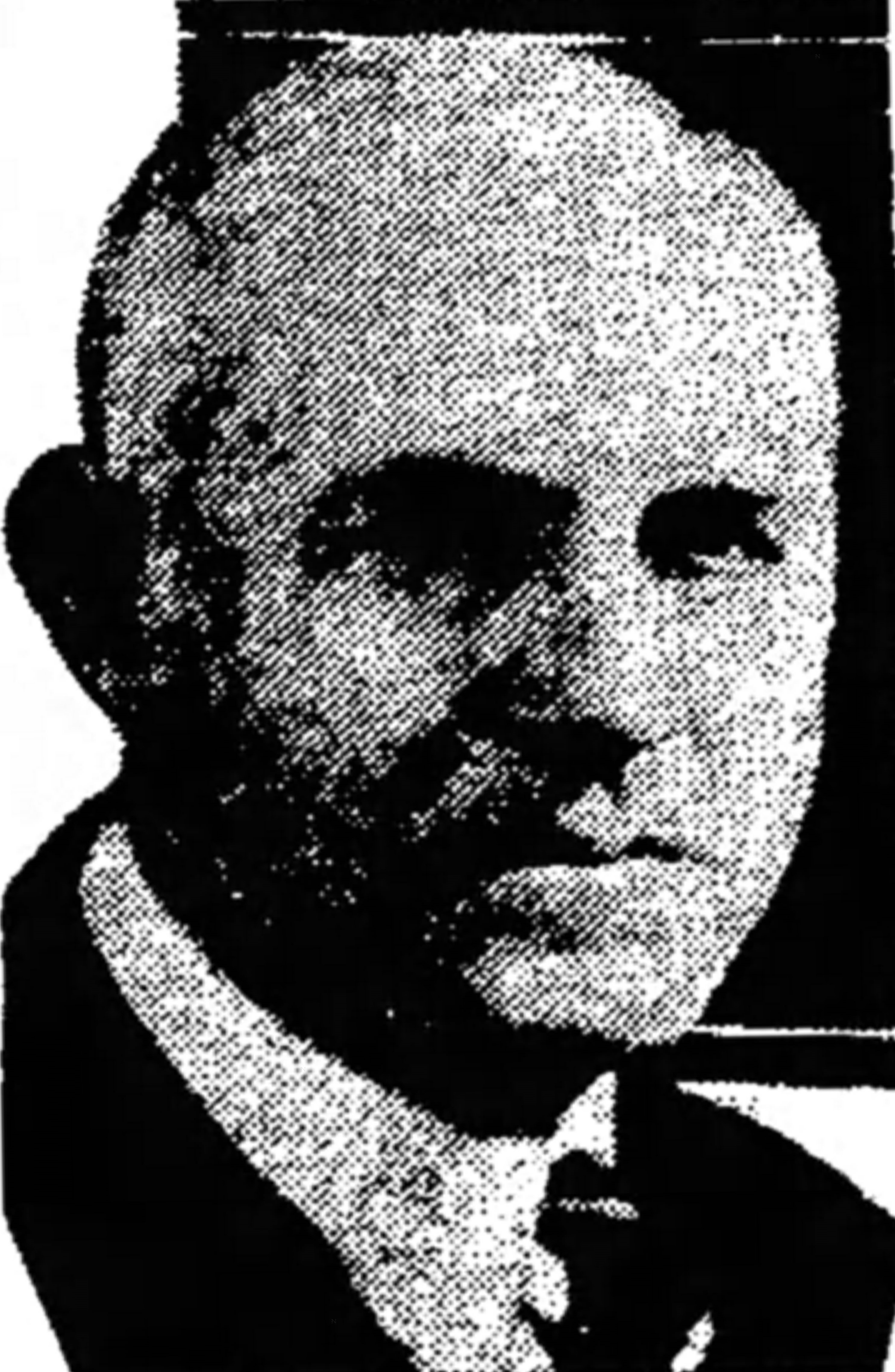

Member of the United States Board of Tax Appeals
- In office May 17, 1933 – January 29, 1935
- Appointed by: Franklin D. Roosevelt
- Preceded by: William D. Love
- Succeeded by: William W. Arnold

Personal details
- Born: January 14, 1876 Kaufman, Texas, U.S.
- Died: January 29, 1935 (aged 59) Washington, D.C., U.S.
- Education: Southwestern University; Bingham School

Jed Cobb Adams (January 14, 1876 – January 29, 1935) was a member of the United States Board of Tax Appeals (later renamed the United States Tax Court) from 1933 to 1935.

== Early life and education ==
Adams was born in Kaufman, Texas. He "attended Southwestern University in Georgetown from 1889 to 1891 and Bingham School in Asheville, North Carolina, in 1892–93", gaining admission to the State Bar of Texas in 1895.

== Career ==
He then held various positions in government, as a civilian and in the military:

From 1898 to 1902 he was state's attorney in Kaufman County. He was a major in the judge advocate general's department of the United States Army in Governors Island, New York, from October 1918 to April 1919. Afterward he received a commission as a lieutenant colonel in the reserve corps. From October 1919 until his resignation in January 1920, he was United States attorney for the Northern District of Texas.

He thereafter practice law in Dallas and became involved in party politics, becoming a Democratic National Committee member for Texas, from 1924 to 1934. On May 17, 1933, he was appointed to the Board of Tax Appeals by President Franklin D. Roosevelt to fill the unexpired term of William D. Love, who had died in April of that year. Adams held that office until his own death the following year.
