= Donald C. Dobbins =

American politician

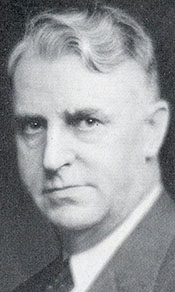

Member of the U.S. House of Representatives from Illinois's 19th district
- In office March 4, 1933 – January 3, 1937
- Preceded by: Charles Adkins
- Succeeded by: Hugh M. Rigney

Personal details
- Born: Donald Claude Dobbins; March 20, 1878 Dewey, Illinois, U.S.
- Died: February 14, 1943 (aged 64) Champaign, Illinois, U.S.
- Resting place: Mount Hope Cemetery
- Party: Democratic
- Education: University of Illinois Urbana-Champaign; George Washington University School of Law

Donald Claude Dobbins (March 20, 1878 – February 14, 1943) was an American lawyer and politician who served two terms as a U.S. representative from Illinois from 1933 to 1937.

== Early life and education ==
Born on a farm near Dewey, Illinois, Dobbins attended public school, the University of Illinois Urbana-Champaign, Dixon Business College, and George Washington University. He then worked as a stenographer from 1900–1906, later working as a post office inspector from 1906–1909. He studied law and was admitted to the bar in 1909, commencing practice in Champaign, Illinois.

== Political career ==
He served as delegate to the Democratic National Convention at Philadelphia in 1936.

=== Congress ===
Dobbins was elected as a Democrat to the Seventy-third and Seventy-fourth Congresses (March 4, 1933 – January 3, 1937). He was not a candidate for renomination in 1936.

== Later career and death ==
After leaving Congress, he resumed his practice of law.

He died in Champaign, Illinois, February 14, 1943 and was interred in Mount Hope Cemetery.

U.S. House of Representatives
Preceded by Charles Adkins	Member of the U.S. House of Representatives from Illinois's 19th congressional district 1933-1937	Succeeded by Hugh M. Rigney
