= Charles W. Vursell =

American politician (1881–1974)

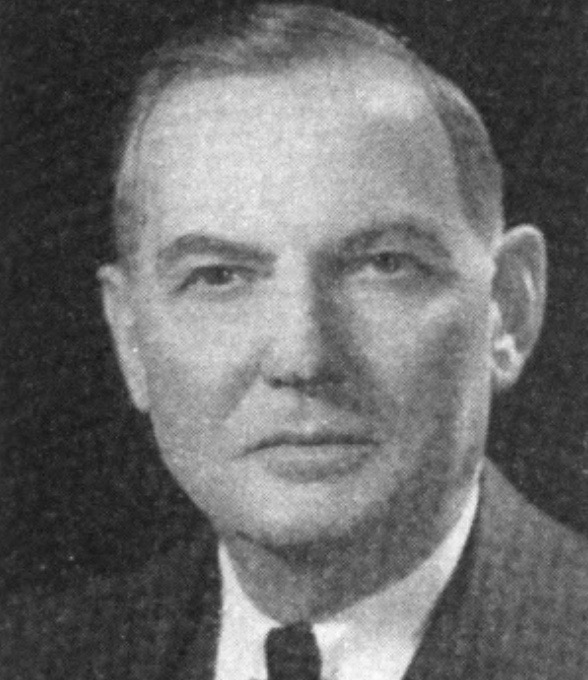

Member of the U.S. House of Representatives from Illinois
- In office January 3, 1943 – January 3, 1959
- Preceded by: Laurence F. Arnold (23rd); Roy Clippinger (24th); Edward H. Jenison (23rd)
- Succeeded by: Edward H. Jenison (23rd); Melvin Price (24th); George E. Shipley (23rd)
- Constituency: 23rd district (1943-49); 24th district (1949-53); 23rd district (1953-59)

Member of the Illinois Senate
- In office 1914–1916

Personal details
- Born: Charles Wesley Vursell; February 8, 1881 Salem, Illinois, U.S.
- Died: September 21, 1974 (aged 93) Salem, Illinois, U.S.
- Party: Republican

Charles Wesley Vursell (February 8, 1881 – September 21, 1974) was a U.S. representative from Illinois.

== Background ==
Born in Salem, Illinois, Vursell attended the public schools of Marion County, Illinois.

== Career ==
In 1904, Vursell was a hardware merchant. He was the sheriff of Marion County from 1910 to 1914. He served as member of the State house of representatives from 1914 to 1916. He was owner and publisher of the Salem Republican from 1916 to 1948.

Vursell was elected as a Republican to the Seventy-eighth and to the seven succeeding Congresses (January 3, 1943 - January 3, 1959). In 1947–8, he served on the Herter Committee. Vursell voted in favor of the Civil Rights Act of 1957. He was an unsuccessful candidate for reelection in 1958 to the Eighty-sixth Congress. He retired and resided in Salem, Illinois, where he died September 21, 1974. He is interred in East Lawn Cemetery.

Vursell's cousin Carl Albert served as a member of Congress from Oklahoma, and was Speaker of the House from 1971 to 1977.

U.S. House of Representatives
Preceded by Laurence F. Arnold	Member of the U.S. House of Representatives from Illinois's 23rd congressional district 1943-1949	Succeeded by Edward H. Jenison
Preceded by Roy Clippinger	Member of the U.S. House of Representatives from Illinois's 24th congressional district 1949-1953	Succeeded by Melvin Price
Preceded by Edward H. Jenison	Member of the U.S. House of Representatives from Illinois's 23rd congressional district 1953-1959	Succeeded by George E. Shipley
