= Hugh M. Rigney =

American politician (1873–1950)

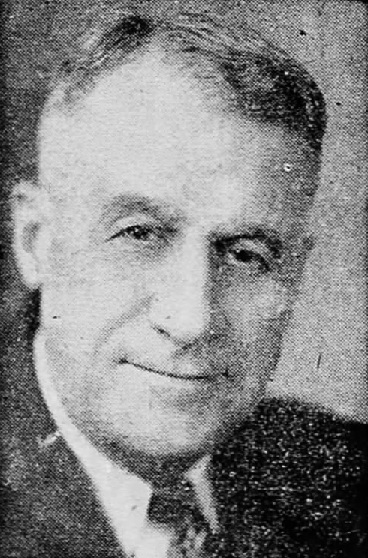
- Herald & Review (Decatur, Illinois), November 7, 1938

Member of the U.S. House of Representatives from Illinois's 19th district
- In office January 3, 1937 – January 3, 1939
- Preceded by: Donald C. Dobbins
- Succeeded by: William H. Wheat

Personal details
- Born: July 31, 1873 Arthur, Illinois, U.S.
- Died: October 12, 1950 (aged 77) Springfield, Illinois, U.S.
- Party: Democratic

Hugh McPheeters Rigney (July 31, 1873 – October 12, 1950) was a U.S. representative from Illinois.

Born in Arthur, Illinois, Rigney attended the local schools and was graduated from the high school of his native city. Apprenticed to the printer's trade and worked as a journeyman. He was editor and owner of the Arthur (Illinois) Graphic-Clarion 1900-1925. He served as city treasurer 1910-1911. He served as member of the school board 1910-1916. He served as chairman of Moultrie County Democratic central committee 1930-1934 and reelected chairman in 1942. He served as member of the State house of representatives 1935-1937.

Rigney was elected as a Democrat to the Seventy-fifth Congress (January 3, 1937 – January 3, 1939). He was an unsuccessful candidate for reelection in 1938 to the Seventy-sixth Congress. He engaged in the real estate brokerage business 1939-1943. He was appointed to a position in the office of the secretary of state on September 15, 1943, and served until his death in Springfield, Illinois on October 12, 1950. He was interred in Arthur Cemetery, Arthur, Illinois.

U.S. House of Representatives
| Preceded by Donald C. Dobbins | Member of the U.S. House of Representatives from Illinois's 19th congressional district 1937-1939 | Succeeded by William H. Wheat |
