= Monticello High School (Illinois) =

Coordinates: 40°1′9.5″N 88°34′20.2″W

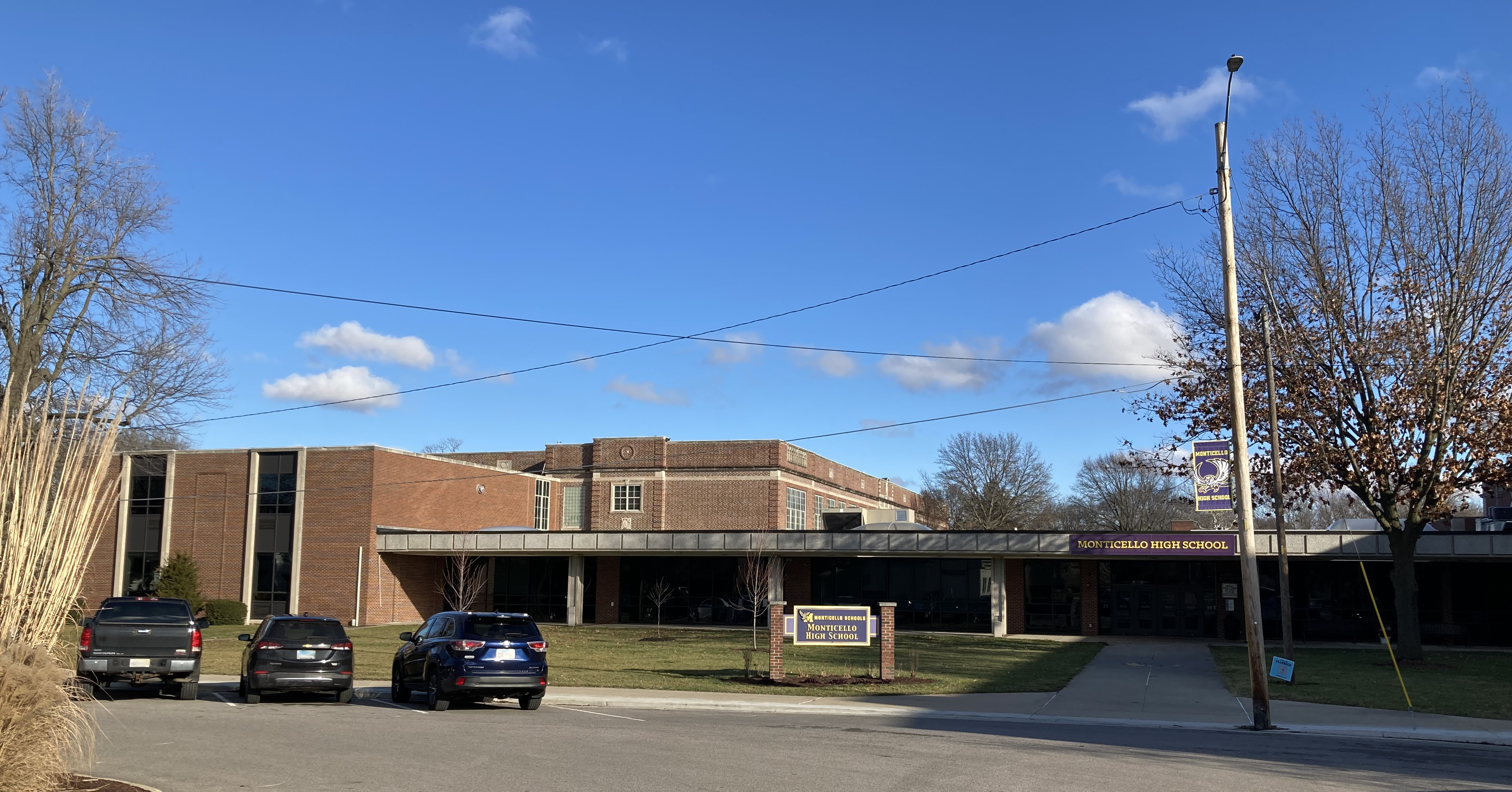

Location
- 1 Sage Drive; Monticello, Illinois 61856

Information
- Type: Public coed
- Established: 1894
- School district: CUSD #25
- Principal: Travis Courson
- Staff: 35.55 (FTE)
- Faculty: 74
- Grades: 9–12
- Enrollment: 479 (2023–2024)
- Student to teacher ratio: 13.47
- Colors: Purple; Gold
- Athletics: IHSA
- Athletics conference: Illini Prairie Conference
- Mascot: Sammy Sage
- Team name: Sages
- Website: Monticello High School

Monticello High School is a coeducational public secondary institution located in Monticello, Illinois. It is a part of Community Unit School District #25. The school draws from the towns of Monticello, Cisco, and White Heath; and the counties of Piatt, Champaign, and DeWitt.

== History ==
A Monticello High School building was built in 1894 and was in use by the district as part of Washington Elementary. The current high school building was constructed directly next to the original structure. However, due to renovation plans, the 1894 building was struck down in the summer of 2019. A new gymnasium (Art "Buz" Sievers Center) was completed in 2020 at the site of the 1894 structure. A new auditorium and various new classrooms were also completed for the start of the 2020-2021 school year.

== Athletics ==
Monticello boys and girls teams participate in the Illini Prairie Conference, a high school athletic conference whose member schools have similar enrollments and are all located in the central Illinois region. The statewide class designation is A, 1A, or 2A, depending on the sport.

The mascot is the Sages, which is often represented by a wise owl. The Sage mascot is named "Sammy Sage". The basis comes from the Thomas Jefferson nickname "Sage of Monticello", which is also the town's namesake. It is a unique nickname among schools in the United States.

State Trophies:

Basketball: 2017 (4th), 2022 (2nd)

Boys Cross Country: 2010 (3rd), 2011 (3rd), 2013 (3rd), 2014 (State Champion), 2018 (3rd), 2019 (State Champion)

Boys Track & Field: 2011 (3rd)

Football: 2018 (State Champion), 2024 (2nd)

Girls Cross Country: 2011 (3rd), 2012 (2nd), 2017 (3rd), 2019 (2nd)

Girls Track & Field: 2018 (3rd)

Softball: 2013 (3rd)

== Monticello Music and the Marching Sages ==
Monticello High School has a music program which is headed by band director Alison Allender and choral director Tricia Shaw. With their productions titled Lincoln (2017) and The Only Way Out ... Is Through (2019), the Marching Sages won the Governor's Trophy both of those years at the Illinois Marching Band Championships and regularly compete at the Bands of America Super Regional in St. Louis, MO.

== Notable alumni ==
- Robert C. Burke, 1967, posthumously awarded the Medal of Honor; killed in action during the Vietnam War
- Harry Combes, 1933, head basketball coach, University of Illinois 1947–1967
- Allen F. Moore, 1886, U.S. Representative
- Rolla C. McMillen, U.S. Representative
