= Norman L. Benefiel =

American politician and excavating contractor

Norman L. "Dutch" Benefiel (August 31, 1924 – April 12, 2009) was an American politician and excavating contractor.

Born in Newton, Illinois, Benefiel went to the Newton Public Schools. He served in the United States Army during World War II. Benefiel worked as an excavating contractor and lived in Newton, Illinois. He was involved with the Democratic Party. Benefiel served in the Illinois House of Representatives in 1961 and 1962. He died at Richland Memorial Hospital in Olney, Illinois.
