= Robert S. Wiseman =

Robert S. Wiseman (February 27, 1924 – August 23, 2013) was an American electrical engineer and military technology researcher best known for his developments of night vision technology.

== Biography ==
=== Early life and war service ===
Robert Swern Wiseman was born February 27, 1924, in Robinson, Illinois, to Mary Jean Swern Wiseman and Wallace Paul Wiseman. He was a descendant of John Andrew Wiseman, a prominent nineteenth-century citizen of Cincinnati, Ohio.

He attended the University of Illinois for Chemical Engineering for a brief time until volunteering in the Army Air Corps in 1943. He served in varying capacities all relating to communications and electronics through the conclusion of the war. He was later awarded the Bronze Star. Following his discharge from active military service, Wiseman attended the University of Illinois and earned his Bachelor's, Master's and Ph.D. degrees.

=== Postwar career in night vision research ===
Wiseman became the Chief of the Research and Photometric Section in the Night Vision Equipment Branch in the Corps of Engineers R&D Laboratories in Fort Belvoir, Virginia in 1954. His work focused on improving night vision. By 1958, he was promoted to branch chief. In 1965, he became director of the newly created Night Vision Laboratory at Fort Belvior as well as at the Combat Surveillance & Target Acquisition Laboratory (C.S.& T.A.) at Fort Monmouth, New Jersey. His work assisted in the development of improved night vision technology utilized in later military actions. Wiseman was known as "Mr. Night Vision" to his colleagues.

In 1980, President Jimmy Carter awarded Wiseman the rank of Distinguished Executive in the Senior Executive Service.

In 1981, Wiseman retired from Civil Service and worked for Martin Marietta Aerospace in Orlando, Florida, where he fulfilled various management positions.

=== Personal life and death ===
Wiseman was married on February 1, 1947, to Norma Mae Woodard, also of Robinson, Illinois. On August 23, 2013, Wiseman died, survived by his wife of 66 years Norma Mae Wiseman, and by a daughter and several grandchildren. Funeral services with military graveside rites conducted by the Robinson VFW Post 459 and the American Legion Post, were held, and his remains were interred in Robinson New Cemetery, Robinson, Illinois.
