= Frank S. Dickson =

American politician

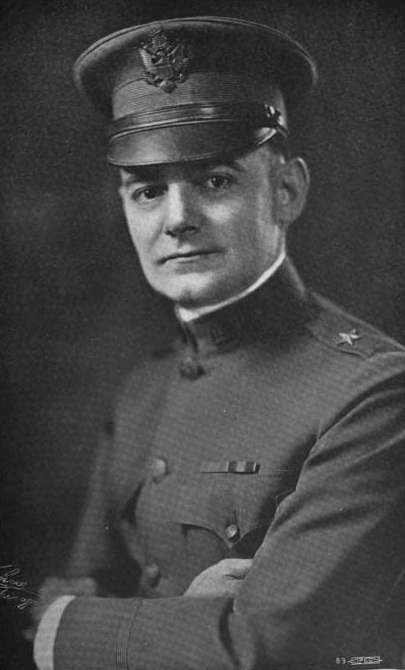

Member of the U.S. House of Representatives from Illinois's 23rd district
- In office March 4, 1905 – March 3, 1907
- Preceded by: Joseph B. Crowley
- Succeeded by: Martin D. Foster

Personal details
- Born: October 6, 1876 Hillsboro, Illinois, U.S.
- Died: February 24, 1953 (aged 76) Washington, D.C., U.S.
- Party: Republican

Frank Stoddard Dickson (October 6, 1876 – February 24, 1953) was a U.S. representative from Illinois.

Born in Hillsboro, Illinois, Dickson attended the public schools and was graduated from the high school at Decatur, Illinois, in 1896. He taught school at Ramsey, Illinois. He served as a private in the Fourth Regiment, Illinois Infantry, during the war with Spain. He again engaged in teaching at Ramsey, Illinois.

Dickson was elected as a Republican to the Fifty-ninth Congress (March 4, 1905 – March 3, 1907). He was an unsuccessful candidate for reelection in 1906 to the Sixtieth Congress. He served as assistant adjutant general of Illinois 1908–1910. He served as adjutant general of Illinois 1910–1922. He served as assistant to the director of finance, United States Shipping Board and Emergency Fleet Corporation from 1922 to 1924. Secretary to Senator Medill McCormick 1924–1926. Associated with the National Board of Fire Underwriters in Chicago, Illinois, and was general counsel at time of death. He died in Washington, D.C., on February 24, 1953. He was temporarily interred in Oak Ridge Cemetery, Springfield, Illinois, and then moved to the nearby Camp Butler National Cemetery.

U.S. House of Representatives
Preceded by Joseph B. Crowley	Member of the U.S. House of Representatives from Illinois's 23rd congressional district 1905-1907	Succeeded by Martin D. Foster
