= Andrew J. Hunter =

American politician (1831–1913)

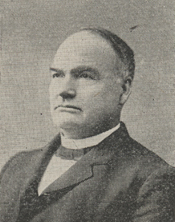

Member of the U.S. House of Representatives from Illinois's 19th district
- In office March 4, 1897 – March 3, 1899
- Preceded by: Benson Wood
- Succeeded by: Joseph B. Crowley

Member of the U.S. House of Representatives from Illinois's at-large district
- In office March 4, 1893 – March 4, 1895
- Preceded by: District created
- Succeeded by: District abolished

Personal details
- Born: December 17, 1831 Greencastle, Indiana, U.S.
- Died: January 12, 1913 (aged 81) Paris, Illinois, U.S.
- Party: Democratic

Andrew Jackson Hunter (December 17, 1831 – January 12, 1913) was a U.S. representative from Illinois.

Born in Greencastle, Indiana, Hunter moved with his parents to Paris, Illinois, in 1832. He attended the common schools and Edgar Academy. He worked as a civil engineer from 1852 to 1856. He studied law, was admitted to the bar in 1856, and commenced practice in Paris. He served as member of the Illinois Senate 1864–1868, and was also a member of the board of investigation of State institutions. He was an unsuccessful candidate in 1870 to the Forty-second Congress and again, in 1882, to the Forty-eighth Congress. He served as judge of the Edgar County court 1886–1892.

Hunter was elected as a Democrat to the Fifty-third Congress (March 4, 1893 – March 4, 1895). He was an unsuccessful candidate for reelection in 1894 to the Fifty-fourth Congress.

Hunter was elected to the Fifty-fifth Congress (March 4, 1897 – March 4, 1899). He was an unsuccessful candidate for reelection in 1898 to the Fifty-sixth Congress. He served as delegate to the Democratic National Convention in 1908. He died in Paris, Illinois, January 12, 1913. He was interred in Edgar Cemetery.

U.S. House of Representatives
Preceded by District elections	Member of the U.S. House of Representatives from Illinois's at-large congressional district March 4, 1893 – March 4, 1895	Succeeded by District elections
Preceded by Benson Wood	Member of the U.S. House of Representatives from Illinois's 19th congressional district March 4, 1897 – March 4, 1899	Succeeded by Joseph B. Crowley
