= Joseph B. Crowley =

American politician (1858–1931)

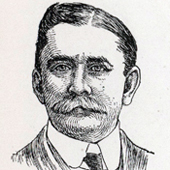

Member of the U.S. House of Representatives from Illinois
- In office March 4, 1899 – March 3, 1905
- Preceded by: Andrew J. Hunter (19th); District established (23rd)
- Succeeded by: Vespasian Warner (19th); Frank S. Dickson (23rd)
- Constituency: 19th district (1899-1903); 23rd district (1903-05)

Personal details
- Born: July 19, 1858 Coshocton, Ohio, U.S.
- Died: June 25, 1931 (aged 72) Robinson, Illinois, U.S.
- Party: Democratic

Joseph Burns Crowley (July 19, 1858 – June 25, 1931) was a U.S. representative from Illinois.

Born in Coshocton, Ohio, Crowley moved with his parents to a farm near St. Marie, Jasper County, Illinois, in 1860, and to Robinson, Illinois, in 1872. He attended the common schools. He engaged in mercantile pursuits 1876-1880. He studied law, and was admitted to the bar in May 1883; he began practice at Robinson, Illinois. He served as president of the Robinson city school board 1884-1888, and as master in chancery 1886-1890.

Crowley was elected judge of Crawford County in November 1886, and reelected in 1890. He was appointed United States special Treasury agent in charge of the seal fisheries of Alaska in April 1893, and served until his resignation in April 1898. Crowley was elected as a Democrat to the Fifty-sixth, Fifty-seventh, and Fifty-eighth Congresses (March 4, 1899 – March 3, 1905). He declined to be a candidate for renomination in 1904 and resumed the practice of law in Robinson, Illinois. He served as State's attorney of Crawford County 1912-1916.

He died in Robinson, Illinois, June 25, 1931, and was interred in the old Robinson Cemetery.

U.S. House of Representatives
Preceded by Andrew J. Hunter	Member of the U.S. House of Representatives from Illinois's 19th congressional district 1899-1903	Succeeded by Vespasian Warner
Preceded by District created	Member of the U.S. House of Representatives from Illinois's 23rd congressional district 1903-1905	Succeeded by Frank S. Dickson
