= Charles Adkins (politician) =

American politician

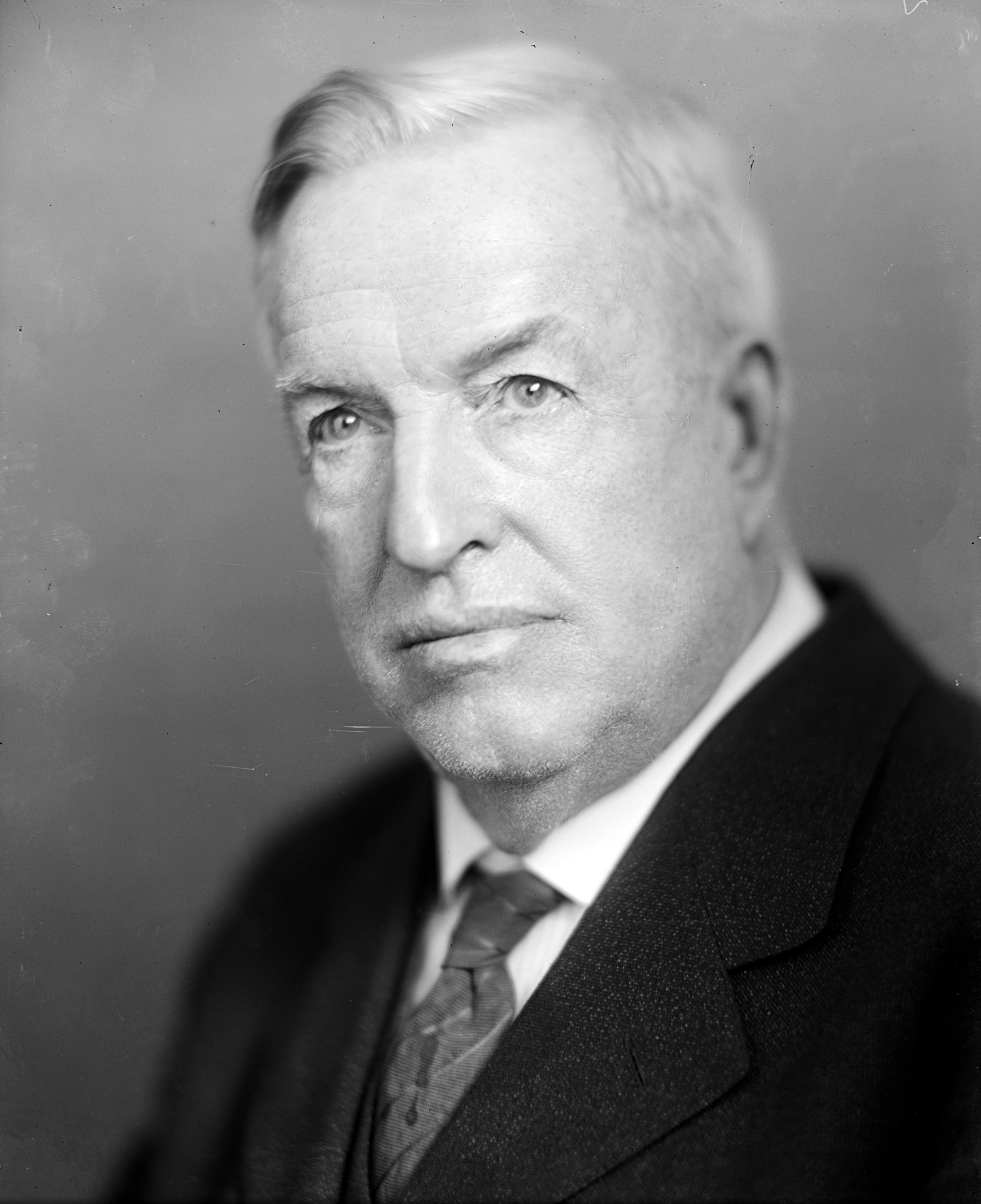

Member of the U.S. House of Representatives from Illinois's 19th district
- In office March 4, 1925 – March 3, 1933
- Preceded by: Allen F. Moore
- Succeeded by: Donald C. Dobbins

Illinois Secretary of Agriculture
- In office 1917–1921
- Governor: Frank O. Lowden

Speaker of the Illinois House of Representatives
- In office 1911–1913
- Preceded by: Edward D. Shurtleff
- Succeeded by: William Michael McKinley

Member of the Illinois House of Representatives
- In office 1907–1913

Personal details
- Born: February 7, 1863 Pickaway County, Ohio, U.S.
- Died: March 31, 1941 (aged 78) Decatur, Illinois, U.S.
- Party: Republican

Charles Adkins (February 7, 1863 – March 31, 1941) was a farmer and U.S. representative who lived in Illinois.

Born on a farm in Pickaway County, Ohio, near Mount Sterling, Adkins attended the common schools. He taught school for several years. He moved to Illinois in 1885 and settled on a farm in Piatt County near Bement, where he engaged in agricultural pursuits and served as president of the Piatt County (Illinois) Farmers' Institute.

He served as member of the board of education of Bement from 1900 to 1920 and as member of the board of supervisors of Piatt County from 1902 to 1906 before his election to the Illinois House of Representatives. Adkins served as member of the Illinois House of Representatives from 1907 to 1913, serving as speaker 1911–1913. He served as president of the Illinois Livestock Breeders' Association in 1914 and 1915. He was appointed State director of agriculture during the administration of Gov. Frank Orren Lowden and served from 1917 to 1921. He moved to Decatur, Illinois, in 1918.

Adkins was elected as a Republican to the Sixty-ninth and to the three succeeding Congresses (March 4, 1925 – March 3, 1933). He was an unsuccessful candidate for reelection in 1932 to the Seventy-third Congress.

Adkins resided in Decatur, Illinois, until his death there on March 31, 1941. He was interred in Bement Cemetery, Bement, Illinois. His son Roy was an American football player who was part of Decatur Staleys in 1919 and 1920, who would later become known as the Chicago Bears.

U.S. House of Representatives
Preceded by Allen F. Moore	Member of the U.S. House of Representatives from Illinois's 19th congressional district 1925–1933	Succeeded by Donald C. Dobbins
