= Vespasian Warner =

American politician (1842–1925)

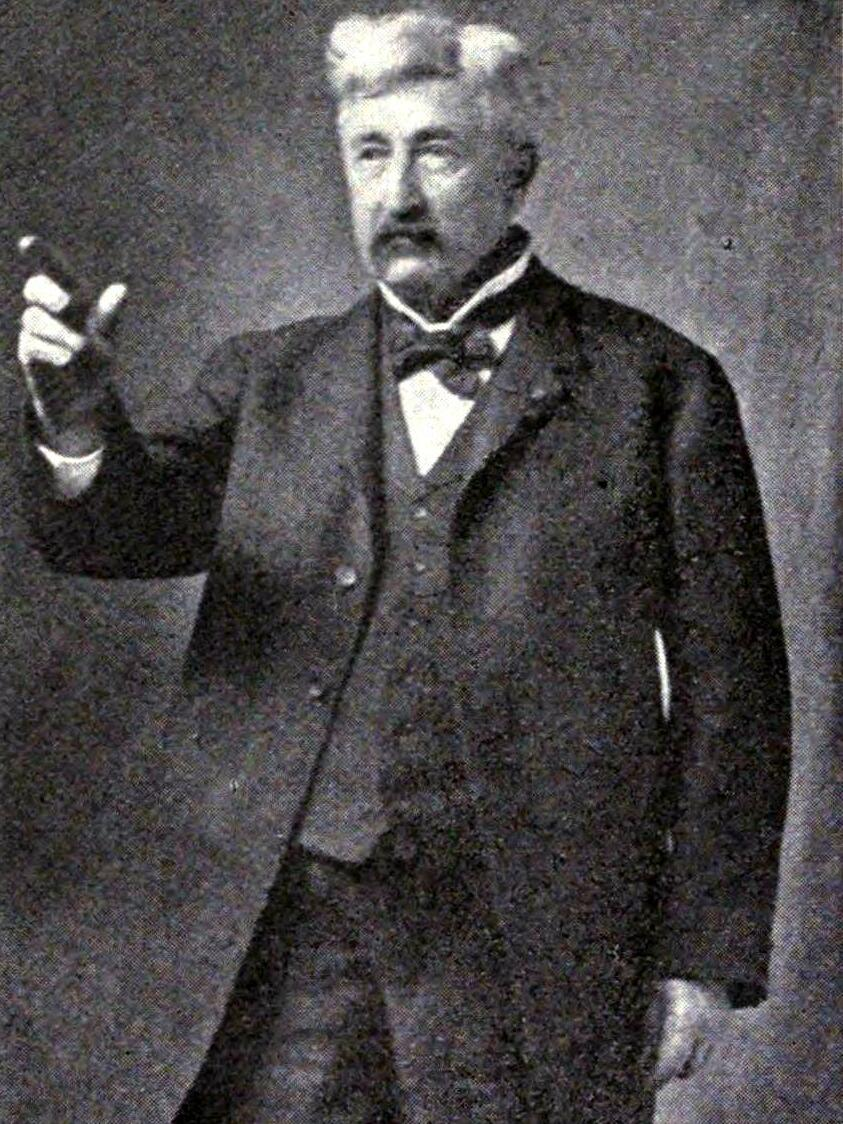
- Warner in 1904

Member of the U.S. House of Representatives from Illinois's 19th district
- In office March 4, 1903 – March 3, 1905
- Preceded by: Joseph B. Crowley
- Succeeded by: William B. McKinley

Member of the U.S. House of Representatives from Illinois's 13th district
- In office March 4, 1895 – March 3, 1903
- Preceded by: William McKendree Springer
- Succeeded by: Robert R. Hitt

Personal details
- Born: April 23, 1842 Farmer City, Illinois, U.S.
- Died: March 31, 1925 (aged 82) Clinton, Illinois, U.S.
- Party: Republican

Vespasian Warner (April 23, 1842 – March 31, 1925) was a U.S. representative from Illinois.

== Biography ==
Born in Mount Pleasant (now Farmer City), De Witt County, Illinois, Warner moved with his parents to Clinton, Illinois, in 1843. He attended public schools in Clinton, and Lombard College in Galesburg, Illinois. He also studied law in Clinton. Enlisted as a private in Company E, 20th Regiment, Illinois Volunteer Infantry, June 13, 1861. He was promoted to sergeant June 23, 1861, second lieutenant February 4, 1862, captain and commissary of subsistence February 10, 1865. He was brevetted major March 13, 1865, and was mustered out July 13, 1866. After his military service, he enrolled in the law department of Harvard University, graduating in 1868. He returned to Illinois the same year to practice law in his hometown of Clinton, Illinois. His law partner was his father-in-law, Clifton H. Moore.

Warner was elected as a Republican to the Fifty-fourth and to the four succeeding Congresses (March 4, 1895 – March 3, 1905).

He served as chairman of the Committee on Revision of the Laws (Fifty-fifth through Fifty-eighth Congresses).

In 1904, Warner ran for Governor of Illinois as a Republican, but he failed to win his party's nomination. The Republican nominee Charles S. Deneen won the general election. After the election, President Theodore Roosevelt nominated Warner for the job of United States Commissioner of Pensions, heading an agency within the Department of the Interior which was roughly equivalent to today's Department of Veterans Affairs. Warner served from March 4, 1905, until November 25, 1909.

He engaged in business in Clinton, Illinois, as a banker and realty owner and agent. He died in Clinton on March 31, 1925. He was interred in Woodlawn Cemetery.

== Vespasian Warner Public Library District ==
Warner's father-in-law, Clifton H. Moore, was an avid book collector. When Moore died in 1901, he left his collection of books to the city of Clinton, provided a proper library could be constructed to house it. In 1906, Warner donated $25,000 and a plot of land to the city for a public library. The Vespasian Warner Public Library opened to the public in 1908 and continues operation to this day.

U.S. House of Representatives
Preceded by William McKendree Springer	Member of the U.S. House of Representatives from Illinois's 13th congressional district 1895–1903	Succeeded by Robert R. Hitt
Preceded by Joseph B. Crowley	Member of the U.S. House of Representatives from Illinois's 19th congressional district 1903–1905	Succeeded by William B. McKinley
