= Albert Isley =

American politician

Albert Elias Isley (January 18, 1871 – December 24, 1953) was an American judge, lawyer, and politician.

Isley was born in Jasper County, Illinois on a farm. He graduated from Valparaiso University. He lived in Newton, Illinois with his wife and family. Isley served on the board of managers of the state reformatory from 1901 to 1904. He served as a state's attorney for Jasper County from 1904 to 1908. He was a Democrat. Isley also served as an Illinois County Judge for Jasper County. Isley served in the Illinois Senate from 1909 to 1913. Isley died at his home in Newton, Illinois.
