= William D. Love =

American judge (1859–1933)

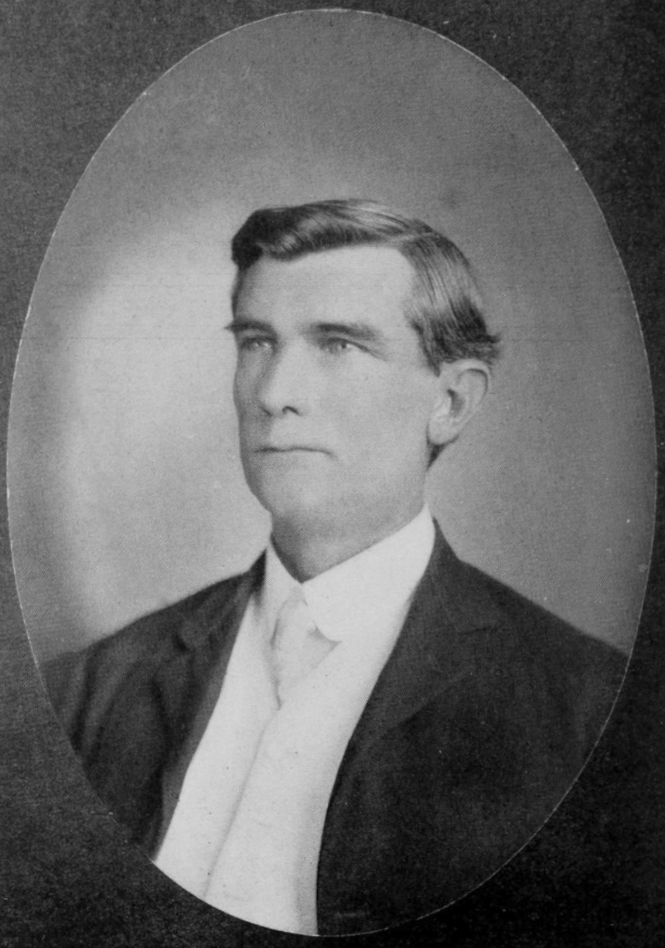
- c. 1907
- Born: William David Love; June 20, 1859; Washington-on-the-Brazos, Texas
- Died: April 16, 1933 (aged 73); Washington, D.C.
- Occupation: Jurist
- Political party: Democratic
- Spouse: Ophelia Wallace (m. 1879)
- Children: 5

Signature
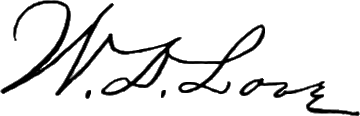

William David Love (June 20, 1859 – April 16, 1933) was a judge of the United States Board of Tax Appeals (later the United States Tax Court) from 1925 to 1933.

== Biography ==
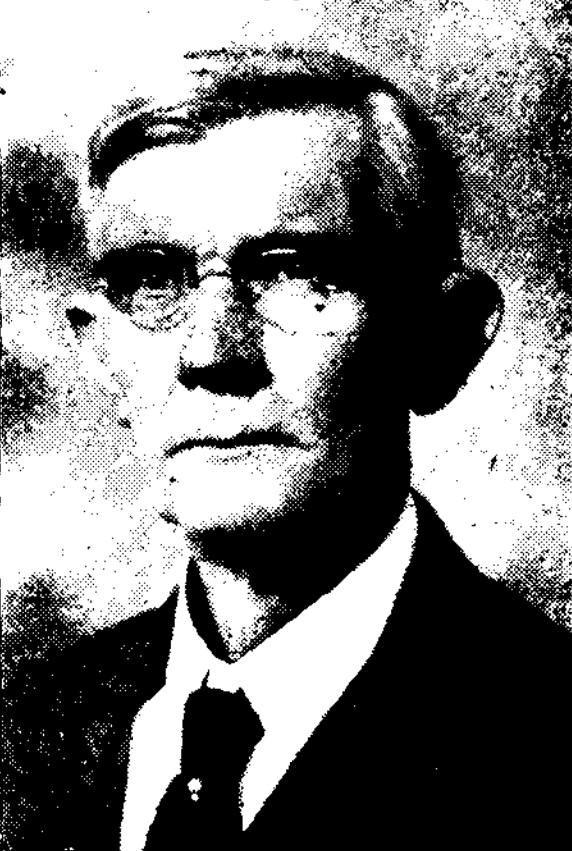
Love in 1926

Born in Washington-on-the-Brazos, Texas, Love was a teacher for seventeen years prior to being admitted to the bar. He practiced law in Uvalde, Texas, where he was the law partner of John Nance Garner for thirty years. A Democrat, he served as mayor of Uvalde for eight years, and as a county judge of Uvalde County, Texas, for another eight years. He was appointed to membership on the Board of Tax Appeals in April 1925, and thereafter reappointed.

He married Ophelia Wallace in 1879, and they had five daughters.

Love died at the Hotel Roosevelt, where he resided in Washington, D.C., at the age of 73, following a lengthy illness. He was interred in Uvalde.
