= George E. Shipley =

American politician

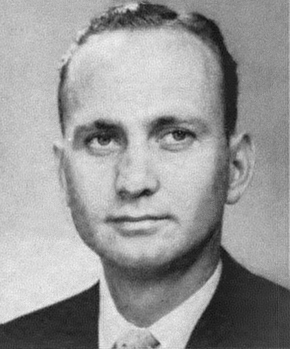
- official portrait, circa 1975

Member of the U.S. House of Representatives from Illinois
- In office January 3, 1959 – January 3, 1979
- Preceded by: Charles W. Vursell
- Succeeded by: Dan Crane
- Constituency: 23rd district (1959–1973); 22nd district (1973–1979)

Personal details
- Born: George Edward Shipley; April 21, 1927 Olney, Illinois, U.S.
- Died: June 28, 2003 (aged 76) Olney, Illinois, U.S.
- Party: Democratic

George Edward Shipley (April 21, 1927 – June 28, 2003) was a U.S. representative from Illinois.

Born in Richland County, near Olney, Illinois, Shipley attended East Richland High School in Olney, Illinois. He graduated from Olney High School in 1950. He served in the United States Marine Corps from 1944 to 1947. A business owner, he was Chief deputy sheriff of Richland County, Illinois from 1950 to 1954 and sheriff from 1954 to 1958.

Shipley was elected as a Democrat to the Eighty-sixth and to the nine succeeding Congresses (January 3, 1959 to January 3, 1979). He notably defeated conservative activist Phyllis Schlafly in 1970 by 91,158 votes (53.97%) to 77,762 (46.04%). He was not a candidate for re-election in 1978 to the Ninety-sixth Congress.

Shipley died on June 28, 2003, in Olney, Illinois.

U.S. House of Representatives
Preceded by Charles W. Vursell	Member of the U.S. House of Representatives from Illinois's 23rd congressional district 1959-1973	Succeeded by Melvin Price
Preceded by Edwin M. Schaefer	Member of the U.S. House of Representatives from Illinois's 22nd congressional district 1973-1979	Succeeded by Dan Crane
