= Robinson, Illinois =

- City
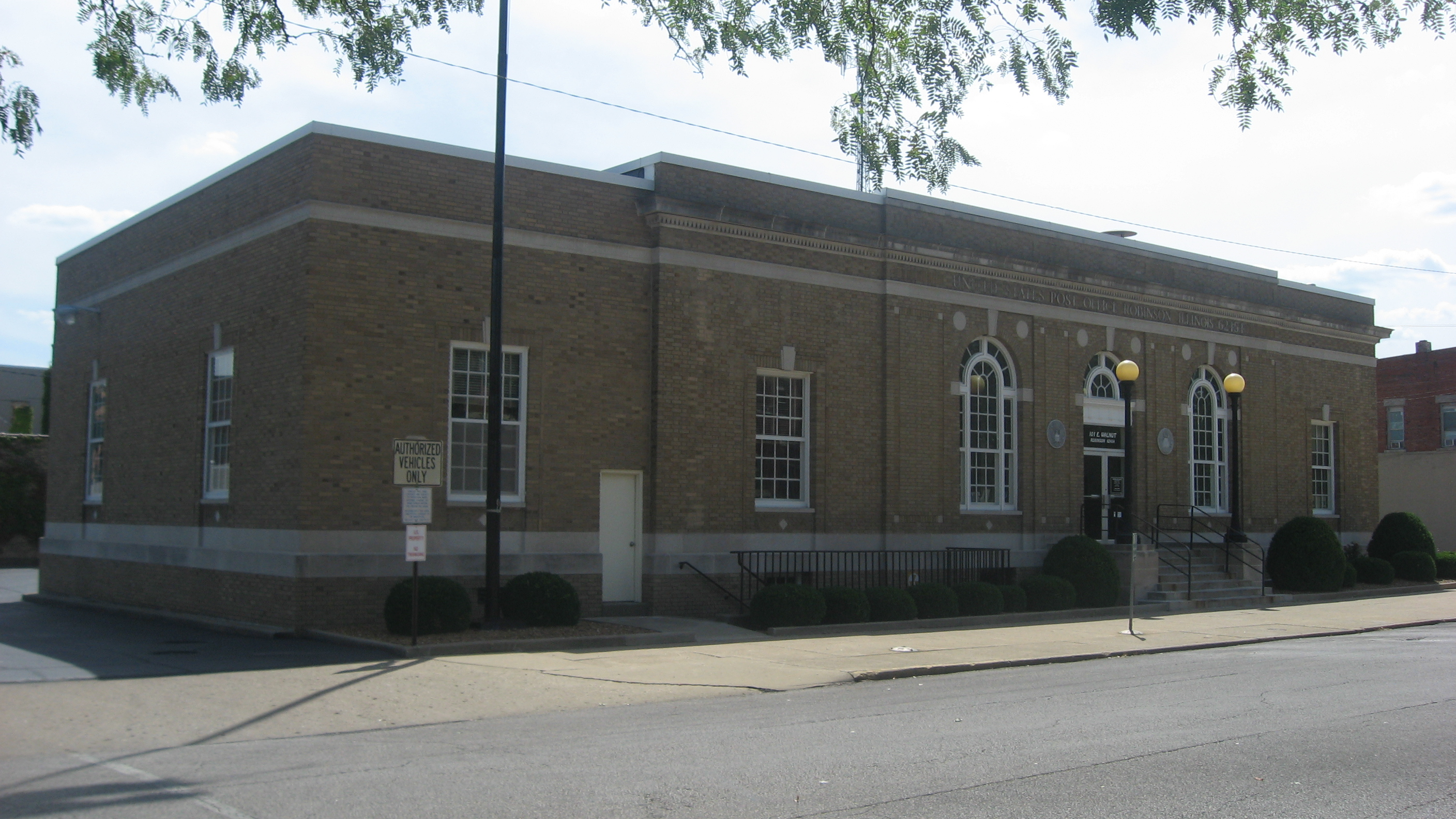
- Robinson Post Office

- Flag
- Interactive map of Robinson, Illinois
- Location within Illinois Location within the United States
- Coordinates: 39°00′26″N 87°45′02″W
- Country: United States
- State: Illinois
- County: Crawford

Area
  - Total: 4.76 sq mi (12.33 km^{2})
  - Land: 4.70 sq mi (12.17 km^{2})
  - Water: 0.062 sq mi (0.16 km^{2})
- Elevation: 525 ft (160 m)

Population (2020)
  - Total: 7,150
  - Density: 1,521.7/sq mi (587.55/km^{2})
- Time zone: UTC-6 (CST)
  - Summer (DST): UTC-5 (CDT)
- ZIP Code(s): 62454
- Area code: 618
- FIPS code: 17–64707
- GNIS feature ID: 2396390
- Website: cityofrobinson.com

Robinson is a city in and the county seat of Crawford County, Illinois, United States. The population was 7,150 at the 2020 census, down from 7,713 at the 2010 census.

== Geography ==
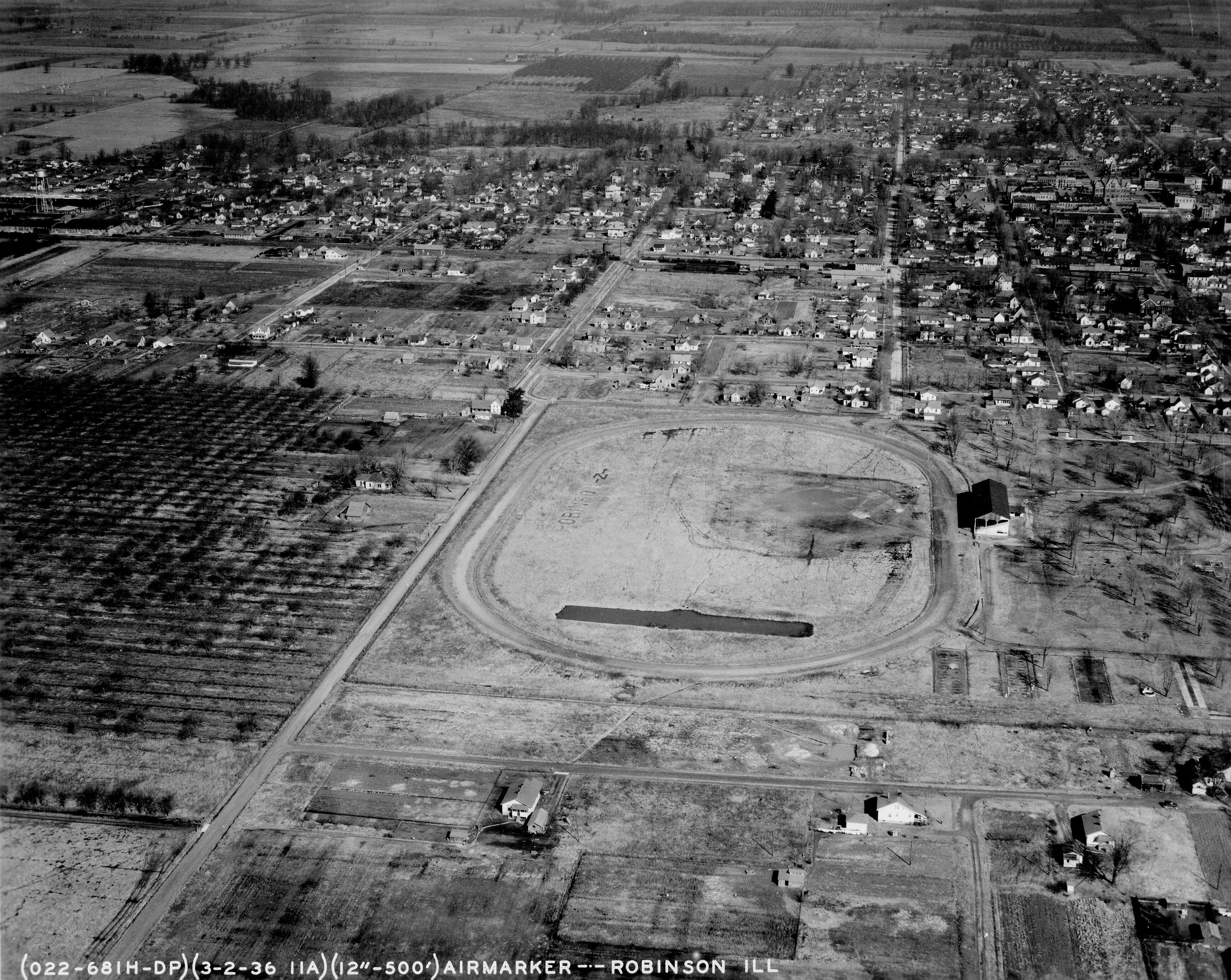
Robinson in 1936

Robinson is in the center of Crawford County. Illinois Route 33 passes through the center of the city as Main Street, leading east 7 miles (11 km) to Palestine near the Indiana border and west 24 miles (39 km) to Newton.

According to the 2021 census gazetteer files, Robinson has a total area of 4.76 square miles (12.33 km^{2}), of which 4.70 square miles (12.17 km^{2}) (or 98.72%) is land and 0.06 square miles (0.16 km^{2}) (or 1.28%) is water.

=== Climate ===
According to the Köppen Climate Classification system, Robinson has a humid subtropical climate, abbreviated "Cfa" on climate maps. The hottest temperature recorded in Robinson was 108 °F (42.2 °C) on July 22, 1901, while the coldest temperature recorded was −20 °F (−28.9 °C) on February 9, 1899.

Climate data for Robinson, Illinois, 1991–2020 normals, extremes 1895–present
Month	Jan	Feb	Mar	Apr	May	Jun	Jul	Aug	Sep	Oct	Nov	Dec	Year
Record high °F (°C)	73 (23)	74 (23)	87 (31)	88 (31)	97 (36)	105 (41)	108 (42)	103 (39)	103 (39)	95 (35)	83 (28)	72 (22)	108 (42)
Mean maximum °F (°C)	60.2 (15.7)	63.6 (17.6)	74.2 (23.4)	83.4 (28.6)	90.1 (32.3)	94.9 (34.9)	95.8 (35.4)	95.7 (35.4)	93.7 (34.3)	86.6 (30.3)	73.5 (23.1)	62.4 (16.9)	97.3 (36.3)
Mean daily maximum °F (°C)	37.1 (2.8)	42.1 (5.6)	52.9 (11.6)	65.7 (18.7)	75.7 (24.3)	84.7 (29.3)	87.4 (30.8)	86.1 (30.1)	80.9 (27.2)	68.2 (20.1)	53.5 (11.9)	41.7 (5.4)	64.7 (18.2)
Daily mean °F (°C)	28.6 (−1.9)	32.8 (0.4)	42.7 (5.9)	54.2 (12.3)	65.0 (18.3)	74.1 (23.4)	76.5 (24.7)	74.5 (23.6)	68.2 (20.1)	56.0 (13.3)	43.6 (6.4)	33.5 (0.8)	54.1 (12.3)
Mean daily minimum °F (°C)	20.1 (−6.6)	23.4 (−4.8)	32.5 (0.3)	42.8 (6.0)	54.3 (12.4)	63.4 (17.4)	65.7 (18.7)	63.0 (17.2)	55.5 (13.1)	43.8 (6.6)	33.7 (0.9)	25.3 (−3.7)	43.6 (6.5)
Mean minimum °F (°C)	−0.5 (−18.1)	4.5 (−15.3)	15.2 (−9.3)	28.6 (−1.9)	38.7 (3.7)	52.0 (11.1)	55.3 (12.9)	52.6 (11.4)	41.0 (5.0)	29.1 (−1.6)	19.1 (−7.2)	7.4 (−13.7)	−4.0 (−20.0)
Record low °F (°C)	−17 (−27)	−20 (−29)	−5 (−21)	22 (−6)	26 (−3)	39 (4)	48 (9)	45 (7)	25 (−4)	21 (−6)	3 (−16)	−9 (−23)	−20 (−29)
Average precipitation inches (mm)	3.11 (79)	2.41 (61)	3.64 (92)	5.17 (131)	4.67 (119)	4.57 (116)	4.17 (106)	3.45 (88)	3.66 (93)	3.70 (94)	3.78 (96)	3.15 (80)	45.48 (1,155)
Average precipitation days (≥ 0.01 in)	7.5	7.5	9.8	9.2	11.2	8.5	8.6	6.2	6.1	7.8	7.6	8.8	98.8
Source 1: NOAA
Source 2: National Weather Service

== Demographics ==
Historical population
Census	Pop.	Note	%±
1880	1,380		—
1890	1,387		0.5%
1900	1,683		21.3%
1910	3,863		129.5%
1920	3,375		−12.6%
1930	3,668		8.7%
1940	4,311		17.5%
1950	6,407		48.6%
1960	7,226		12.8%
1970	7,178		−0.7%
1980	7,285		1.5%
1990	6,740		−7.5%
2000	6,822		1.2%
2010	7,713		13.1%
2020	7,150		−7.3%
U.S. Decennial Census

=== 2020 census ===
As of the 2020 census, Robinson had a population of 7,150, with 1,605 families residing in the city. The median age was 40.3 years. 18.6% of residents were under the age of 18 and 19.2% of residents were 65 years of age or older. For every 100 females there were 126.9 males, and for every 100 females age 18 and over there were 130.6 males age 18 and over.

84.7% of residents lived in urban areas, while 15.3% lived in rural areas.

There were 2,698 households in Robinson, of which 27.7% had children under the age of 18 living in them. Of all households, 39.9% were married-couple households, 20.6% were households with a male householder and no spouse or partner present, and 30.7% were households with a female householder and no spouse or partner present. About 36.4% of all households were made up of individuals and 18.1% had someone living alone who was 65 years of age or older.

The population density was 1,502.10 inhabitants per square mile (579.96/km^{2}). There were 3,222 housing units at an average density of 676.89 units per square mile (261.35 units/km^{2}). Of all housing units, 16.3% were vacant. The homeowner vacancy rate was 4.8% and the rental vacancy rate was 16.0%.

Racial composition as of the 2020 census
Race	Number	Percent
White	5,994	83.8%
Black or African American	560	7.8%
American Indian and Alaska Native	26	0.4%
Asian	44	0.6%
Native Hawaiian and Other Pacific Islander	1	0.0%
Some other race	221	3.1%
Two or more races	304	4.3%
Hispanic or Latino (of any race)	343	4.8%

=== Income and poverty ===
The median income for a household in the city was $45,137, and the median income for a family was $61,625. Males had a median income of $42,642 versus $25,938 for females. The per capita income for the city was $20,646. About 12.6% of families and 15.1% of the population were below the poverty line, including 13.1% of those under age 18 and 12.0% of those age 65 or over.

Major employers in the town include a refinery owned by Marathon Petroleum Company and a chocolate factory for the Heath bar, first made in 1914, now distributed by The Hershey Company.

== Media ==
- Robinson Daily News

== Education ==
The following schools are operated by Robinson Community Unit School District 2:

- Robinson High School - grades 9–12
- Nuttall Middle School - grades 6–8
- Lincoln Grade School - grades 3–5
- Washington Elementary School - grades PreK-2

== Notable people ==
- Lisa Brown (born 1956), member of the Washington State Legislature from 1993 to 2013
- Robert Brubaker, actor (Gunsmoke)
- Calli Cox, adult film actress
- Caswell J. Crebs, justice of the Illinois Supreme Court
- Joseph B. Crowley, U.S. congressman
- Perry Graves, 1914 first-team All-American football player for the University of Illinois
- James Jones, author (From Here to Eternity, The Thin Red Line, Some Came Running)
- Meyers Leonard, former basketball center for the Miami Heat
- Skip Martin, musician and arranger
- Frankie Masters, band leader
- Robert S. Wiseman, war technology researcher and innovator of night vision
