= Newton, Illinois =

- City
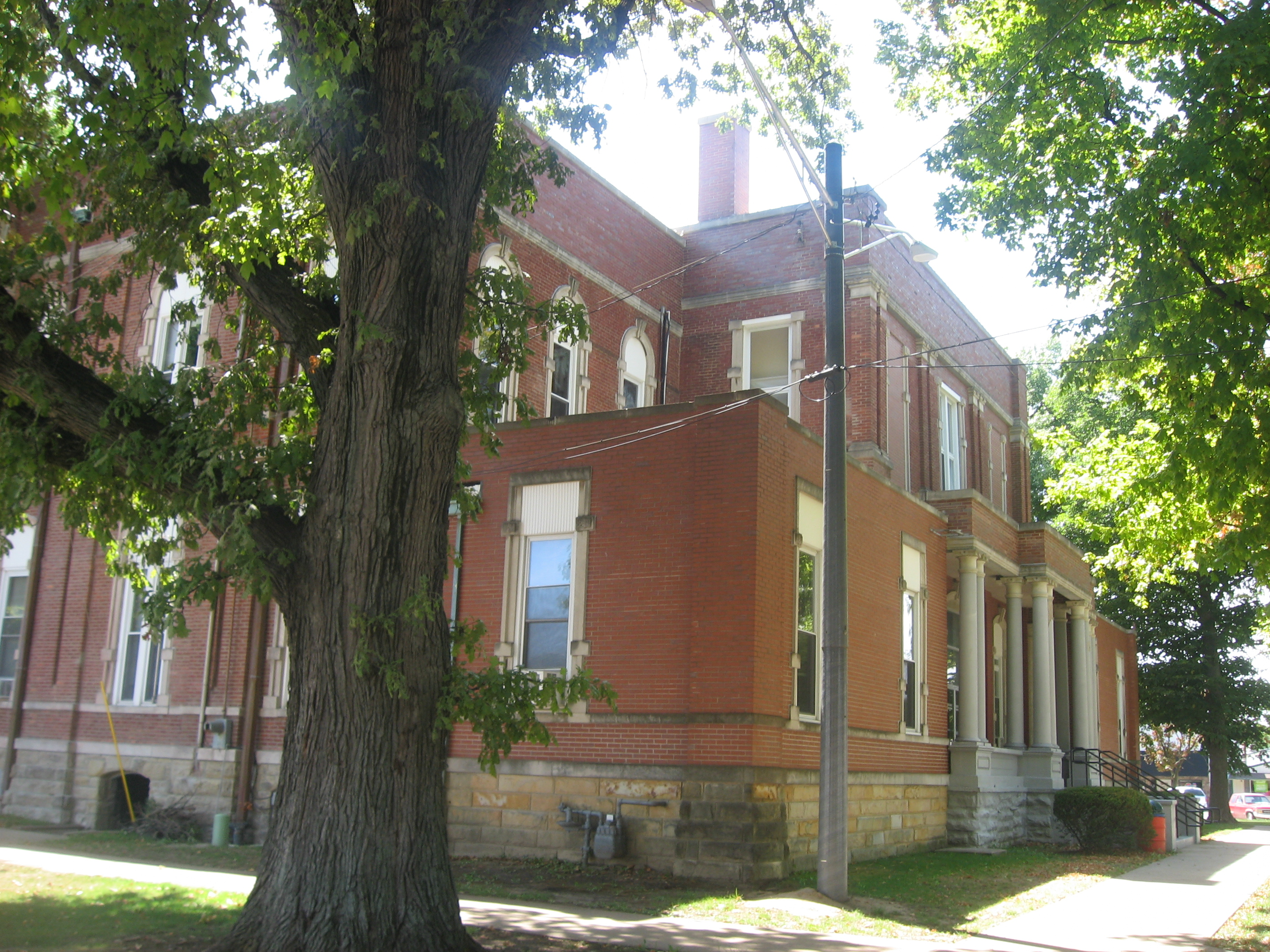
- Jasper County Courthouse
- Interactive map of Newton, Illinois
- Location within Illinois Location within the United States
- Coordinates: 38°59′14″N 88°09′52″W
- Country: United States
- State: Illinois
- County: Jasper
- Township: Wade
- Founded: 1835

Area
  - Total: 2.09 sq mi (5.41 km^{2})
  - Land: 2.09 sq mi (5.41 km^{2})
  - Water: 0 sq mi (0.00 km^{2})
- Elevation: 525 ft (160 m)

Population (2020)
  - Total: 2,777
  - Density: 1,329.7/sq mi (513.39/km^{2})
- Time zone: UTC-6 (CST)
  - Summer (DST): UTC-5 (CDT)
- ZIP code: 62448
- Area code: 618
- FIPS code: 17–52844
- GNIS feature ID: 2395228
- Website: jaspercountyillinois.gov

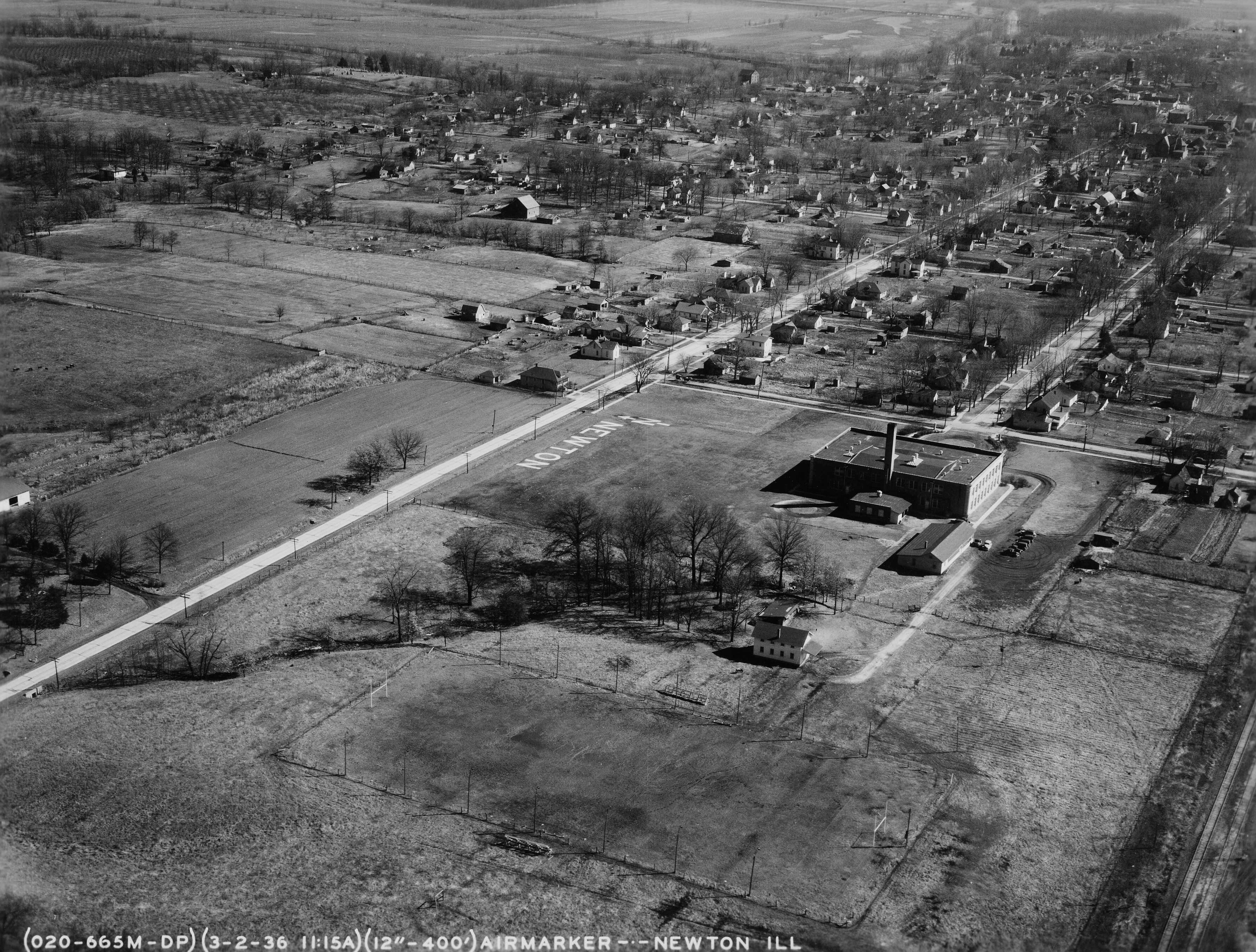
Newton in 1936

Newton is a city in and the county seat of Jasper County, Illinois, United States. The population was 2,777 at the 2020 census. Newton is home to a large coal-fired power plant operated by Illinois Power Generating Co and is close to Newton Lake State Fish and Wildlife Area and Sam Parr State Fish and Wildlife Area.

Newton is also home to the Drive 'n Theatre, formerly known as the Fairview Drive-In, which opened in 1953. It is one of ten drive-ins left standing in Illinois.

== History ==
Newton is the largest, oldest and only city (although there are several villages) in Jasper County. Because of its favorable location within the county, it was named county seat in 1835.

Jasper County was formed in 1831 and approved on December 19, 1834. The county was named after Revolutionary War hero Sergeant Jasper. He and his close friend, Sergeant Newton, were patriots that saved American prisoners of war from certain death at the hands of British soldiers. Thus, the county and town became their namesakes.

A post office was established in Newton in March 1883. The post office was not established in a building, but rather in a man's hat. A rider brought the mail from Vincennes, Indiana, made a stop in Newton once a week and then continued delivering mail on his route north of Newton.

By 1841 the town had increased to five families. Lawrence Hollenbock and Samuel Garwood built a saw- and gristmill, and Benjamin Harris opened the first grocery store in Newton. In 1855, Newton had Miller's Hotel and a small inn known as the American House that is now Yesterday's Pub and Dining.

By 1865, the population of Newton had grown to 300; a decade later the population had reached 400. In 1874 Joe Litzelman's Hack Express began traveling daily to and from Olney on what is now Route 130.

== Geography ==
Newton is located at the geographic center of Jasper County on a bluff overlooking the Embarras River.

Illinois Route 33 passes through the center of Newton as Jourdan Street; it leads east 24 miles (39 km) to Robinson and northwest 23 miles (37 km) to Effingham. Illinois Route 130 enters Newton from the south on Van Buren Street and leaves to the east on Jourdan Street with Route 33; Route 130 leads north 19 miles (31 km) to Greenup and south 20 miles (32 km) to Olney.

According to the 2021 census gazetteer files, Newton has a total area of 2.09 square miles (5.41 km^{2}), all land.

=== Climate ===
Climate data for Newton, Illinois (1991–2020)
Month	Jan	Feb	Mar	Apr	May	Jun	Jul	Aug	Sep	Oct	Nov	Dec	Year
Mean daily maximum °F (°C)	37.3 (2.9)	42.2 (5.7)	52.8 (11.6)	64.8 (18.2)	74.5 (23.6)	83.5 (28.6)	86.4 (30.2)	85.1 (29.5)	79.5 (26.4)	67.6 (19.8)	53.1 (11.7)	41.6 (5.3)	64.0 (17.8)
Daily mean °F (°C)	29.5 (−1.4)	33.8 (1.0)	43.4 (6.3)	54.5 (12.5)	64.5 (18.1)	73.7 (23.2)	76.6 (24.8)	75.0 (23.9)	68.1 (20.1)	56.6 (13.7)	43.9 (6.6)	34.2 (1.2)	54.5 (12.5)
Mean daily minimum °F (°C)	21.7 (−5.7)	25.3 (−3.7)	34.1 (1.2)	44.2 (6.8)	54.6 (12.6)	63.8 (17.7)	66.8 (19.3)	64.8 (18.2)	56.8 (13.8)	45.5 (7.5)	34.7 (1.5)	26.7 (−2.9)	44.9 (7.2)
Average precipitation inches (mm)	3.22 (82)	2.61 (66)	3.73 (95)	5.01 (127)	4.79 (122)	5.28 (134)	4.23 (107)	3.06 (78)	3.26 (83)	3.84 (98)	3.86 (98)	3.14 (80)	46.03 (1,170)
Average snowfall inches (cm)	5.3 (13)	3.9 (9.9)	2.1 (5.3)	0.2 (0.51)	0.0 (0.0)	0.0 (0.0)	0.0 (0.0)	0.0 (0.0)	0.0 (0.0)	0.0 (0.0)	0.7 (1.8)	3.8 (9.7)	16 (40.21)
Source: NOAA

== Demographics ==
Historical population
Census	Pop.	Note	%±
1880	1,168		—
1890	1,428		22.3%
1900	1,630		14.1%
1910	2,108		29.3%
1920	2,083		−1.2%
1930	2,076		−0.3%
1940	2,347		13.1%
1950	2,780		18.4%
1960	2,901		4.4%
1970	3,024		4.2%
1980	3,186		5.4%
1990	3,154		−1.0%
2000	3,069		−2.7%
2010	2,849		−7.2%
2020	2,777		−2.5%
U.S. Decennial Census

Today, Newton has a population near 3,000. The community is made up of local businesses, industry, a high school of around 500 students and several organizations and churches. Downtown Newton is thriving after the completion of new lighting and a streetscape project. There are many organizations that are keeping Newton moving forward including the Jasper County Chamber of Commerce, JEDI, 100 Women Who Care, Eagle For Life, and many more.

=== 2020 census ===
As of the 2020 census, Newton had a population of 2,777, with 1,214 households and 740 families residing in the city. The population density was 1,329.98 inhabitants per square mile (513.51/km^{2}), and there were 1,356 housing units at an average density of 649.43 per square mile (250.75/km^{2}).

The median age was 44.7 years. 20.0% of residents were under the age of 18 and 24.1% were 65 years of age or older. For every 100 females, there were 91.5 males, and for every 100 females age 18 and over there were 87.5 males age 18 and over.

0.0% of residents lived in urban areas, while 100.0% lived in rural areas.

Of all households, 25.5% had children under the age of 18 living in them. 42.3% were married-couple households, 17.0% were households with a male householder and no spouse or partner present, and 33.4% were households with a female householder and no spouse or partner present. About 36.8% of all households were made up of individuals and 18.1% had someone living alone who was 65 years of age or older.

Of the 1,356 housing units, 10.5% were vacant. The homeowner vacancy rate was 3.5% and the rental vacancy rate was 10.2%.

Racial composition as of the 2020 census
Race	Number	Percent
White	2,646	95.3%
Black or African American	16	0.6%
American Indian and Alaska Native	4	0.1%
Asian	4	0.1%
Native Hawaiian and Other Pacific Islander	1	0.0%
Some other race	15	0.5%
Two or more races	91	3.3%
Hispanic or Latino (of any race)	49	1.8%

=== Income and poverty ===
The median income for a household in the city was $43,293, and the median income for a family was $55,722. Males had a median income of $39,643 versus $21,849 for females. The per capita income for the city was $24,801. About 15.4% of families and 19.0% of the population were below the poverty line, including 37.6% of those under age 18 and 8.4% of those age 65 or over.

== Education ==
Newton resides in the Jasper County Community Unit School District 1, which is geographically the largest school district in Illinois. The schools in the town include Newton Community High School/Jasper County Junior High, Newton Elementary and Saint Thomas Elementary School.

== Notable people ==
Newton has produced several notable natives. These include:

- Norman L. Benefiel, Illinois state representative
- Irene Hunt, author of the historical novel about the Civil War, Across Five Aprils
- Albert Isley, Illinois state senator
- Burl Ives, folk singer
- Hale Johnson, Prohibition Party politician, Mayor of Newton
- Ross Wolf, pro baseball pitcher
- Lori Kerans, Woman’s Basketball Coach
