= Mantrap =

Mantrap or man trap may refer to:

== Devices ==
- Mantrap (access control), a double-door single-person access control space
- Mantrap (snare), a mechanical device for catching trespassers

== Entertainment ==
=== Films ===
- Mantrap (1926 film), a silent film based on the Sinclair Lewis novel
- The Mantrap, a 1943 American mystery film directed by George Sherman
- Mantrap (1953 film), a British whodunit film directed by Terence Fisher
- Man-Trap, a 1961 American film directed by Edmond O'Brien

=== Television ===
- "The Man Trap", a 1966 episode of the television series Star Trek
- "Man Trap", a 1986 episode of the BBC television sitcom Hi-de-Hi!
- Mantrap, a 1971 to 1973 weekday daytime panel show, from BCTV, now CHAN-DT, in Vancouver, for CTV Television Network, hosted by Alan Hamel
- "Mantrap" (The Adventures of Black Beauty), a 1972 episode of the British television series Adventures of Black Beauty

=== Other entertainment ===
- Mantrap (novel), a 1926 novel by Sinclair Lewis

== Places ==
- Mantrap Lake, a lake in Minnesota, U.S.
- Mantrap Township, Hubbard County, Minnesota, a township in Minnesota, U.S.
