= Samuel T. Busey =

American politician

Samuel Thompson Busey
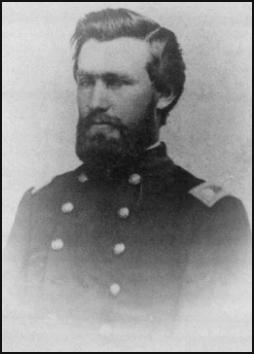

Member of the U.S. House of Representatives from Illinois's 15th district
- In office March 4, 1891 – March 3, 1893
- Preceded by: Joseph Gurney Cannon
- Succeeded by: Joseph Gurney Cannon

Personal details
- Born: November 16, 1835 Greencastle, Indiana, U.S.
- Died: August 12, 1909 (aged 73) Mantrap Township, Minnesota, U.S.

Military service
- Allegiance: United States of America; Union
- Branch/service: United States Army; Union Army
- Years of service: 1861–1865
- Rank: Colonel; Brevet Brigadier General
- Commands: 76th Illinois Volunteer Infantry Regiment
- Battles/wars: American Civil War

Samuel Thompson Busey (November 16, 1835 – August 12, 1909) was a veteran of the Civil War who served one term as a U.S. representative from Illinois from 1891 to 1893.

== Biography ==
Samuel Busey was born in Greencastle, Indiana but moved with his parents to Urbana, Illinois. He attended the public schools and went on to study law where he attended commercial college and law lectures in 1859 and 1860.

=== Civil War ===
During the Civil War he served as first sergeant and then first lieutenant of the Urbana Zouaves in 1861 and 1862.

He was appointed Town collector in 1862 and became a second lieutenant in the recruiting service in June 1862 and helped to organize the Seventy-sixth Regiment, Illinois Volunteer Infantry where he served as captain of Company B of that regiment June 22, 1862.

He later served as a lieutenant colonel August 22, 1862 and was promoted to colonel January 7, 1863.

On July 20, 1866, President Andrew Johnson nominated Busey for appointment to the grade of brevet brigadier general of volunteers, to rank from April 9, 1865, and the United States Senate confirmed the appointment on July 26, 1866.

He mustered out of the service July 22, 1865, in Chicago, Illinois and engaged in banking from 1867 to 1888. He later served as mayor of Urbana 1880–1889.

=== Congress ===
Busey was elected as a Democrat to the Fifty-second Congress (March 4, 1891 – March 3, 1893) defeating Joseph Gurney Cannon.

He was an unsuccessful candidate for reelection in 1892 to the Fifty-third Congress, losing to Cannon (who regained his seat). This pattern would be repeated 22 years later by fellow Democrat banker Frank T. O'Hair.

=== Later career and death ===
After his failed reelection he returned to banking.

He died in a boating accident in Mantrap Township, Hubbard County, Minnesota August 12, 1909 while on a family vacation. His niece, Annie McClain, was killed in the same accident. He was interred in Woodlawn Cemetery, Urbana, Illinois.

== See also ==
- List of American Civil War brevet generals (Union)

U.S. House of Representatives
Preceded by Joseph Gurney Cannon	Member of the U.S. House of Representatives from Illinois's 15th congressional district March 4, 1891 – March 3, 1893	Succeeded by Joseph Gurney Cannon
