= William F. L. Hadley =

American politician

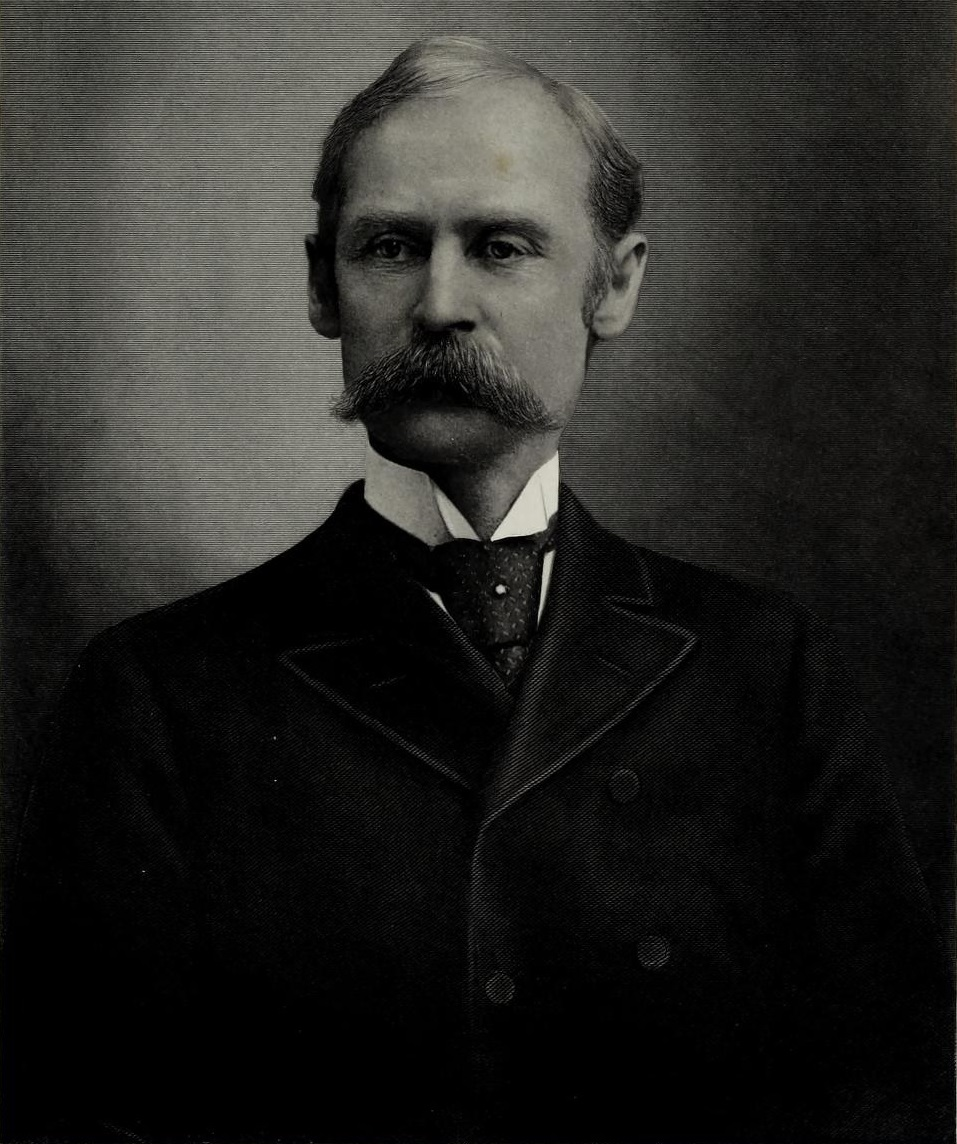
- From Volume II (1912) of Centennial History of Madison County, Illinois, and its People, 1812 to 1912

Member of the U.S. House of Representatives from Illinois's 18th district
- In office December 2, 1895 – March 3, 1897
- Preceded by: Frederick Remann
- Succeeded by: Thomas M. Jett

Member of the Illinois Senate
- In office 1886

Personal details
- Born: June 15, 1847 Collinsville, Illinois, U.S.
- Died: April 25, 1901 (aged 53) Riverside, California, U.S.
- Party: Republican

William Flavius Lester Hadley (June 15, 1847 – April 25, 1901) was a U.S. Representative from Illinois.

Born near Collinsville, Illinois, Hadley attended the common schools. He was graduated from McKendree College, Lebanon, Illinois, in June 1867, and from the law department of the University of Michigan at Ann Arbor in 1871. He was admitted to the bar in 1871 and commenced practice at Edwardsville, Illinois. He served as member of the State senate in 1886. He served as delegate to the Republican National Convention in 1888.

Hadley was elected as a Republican to the Fifty-fourth Congress to fill the vacancy caused by the death of Frederick Remann and served from December 2, 1895, to March 3, 1897. He was an unsuccessful candidate for reelection in 1896. He engaged in banking. He died in Riverside, California, April 25, 1901. He was interred in Woodlawn Cemetery, Edwardsville, Illinois.

U.S. House of Representatives
Preceded by Frederick Remann	Member of the U.S. House of Representatives from Illinois's 18th congressional district December 2, 1895 – March 3, 1897	Succeeded by Thomas M. Jett
