= William S. Forman =

American politician (1847–1908)

William St. John Forman
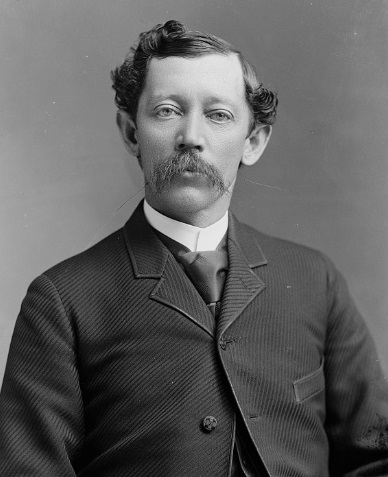
- C.M. Bell Studio Collection (Library of Congress)

14th Commissioner of Internal Revenue
- In office November 27, 1896 – December 31, 1897
- President: Grover Cleveland; William McKinley
- Preceded by: Joseph S. Miller
- Succeeded by: Nathan B. Scott

Member of the U.S. House of Representatives from Illinois's 18th district
- In office March 4, 1889 – March 3, 1895
- Preceded by: Jehu Baker
- Succeeded by: Frederick Remann

Member of the Illinois Senate
- In office 1884-1888

Personal details
- Born: January 20, 1847 Natchez, Mississippi, U.S.
- Died: June 10, 1908 (aged 61) Champaign, Illinois, U.S.
- Party: Democratic

William St. John Forman (January 20, 1847 – June 10, 1908) was a U.S. representative from Illinois.

== Early life ==
Born in Natchez, Mississippi, Forman moved with his father to Nashville, Washington County, Illinois, in 1851. He attended the public schools, and Washington Seminary, Richview, Illinois. He studied law, was admitted to the bar in 1870, and commenced practice in Nashville, Illinois.

== Career ==
He served as mayor of Nashville, Illinois from 1878 to 1884, and was a delegate to all State and National Democratic Conventions from 1876 to 1896. He was a member of the Illinois Senate from 1884 to 1888. Forman was elected as a Democrat to the Fifty-first, Fifty-second, and Fifty-third Congresses (March 4, 1889 - March 3, 1895). He served as chairman of the Committee on Militia during the Fifty-third Congress.

Forman moved to East St. Louis, Illinois in 1895, where he resumed practicing law. He was an unsuccessful candidate as a Gold Standard Democrat for election as governor in 1896. He was appointed by President Grover Cleveland as Commissioner of Internal Revenue and served from 1896 to 1897. Forman died in Champaign, Illinois on June 10, 1908. He was interred in Masonic Cemetery, Nashville, Illinois.

U.S. House of Representatives
Preceded by Jehu Baker	Member of the U.S. House of Representatives from Illinois's 18th congressional district 1889–1895	Succeeded by Frederick Remann
