= Frederick Remann =

American politician

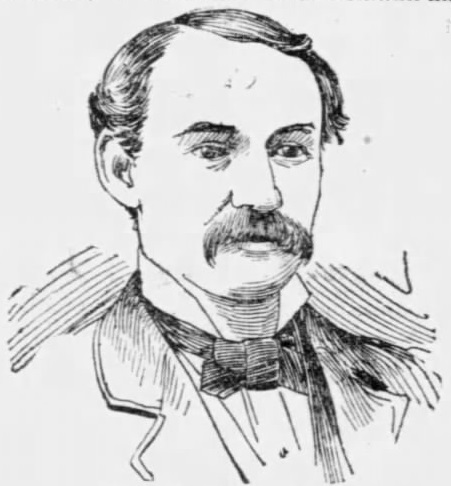
- Chicago Tribune, May 13, 1895

Member of the U.S. House of Representatives from Illinois's 18th district
- In office March 4, 1895 – July 14, 1895
- Preceded by: William St. John Forman
- Succeeded by: William F. L. Hadley

Member of the Illinois House of Representatives
- In office 1877-1878

Personal details
- Born: May 10, 1847 Vandalia, Illinois, U.S.
- Died: July 14, 1895 (aged 48) Vandalia, Illinois, U.S.
- Party: Republican

Frederick Remann (May 10, 1847 – July 14, 1895) was an Illinois Republican politician. He was a member of the Illinois House of Representatives and was also elected from Illinois to the United States House of Representatives.

== Biography ==
Born in Vandalia, Illinois, Remann attended the common schools of Vandalia and the Mifflin (Pennsylvania) Academy. He was graduated from the Iron City Business College, Pittsburgh, Pennsylvania, in April 1865. During the Civil War he served as corporal in Company E, One Hundred and Forty-third Regiment, Illinois Volunteer Infantry. He again attended Mifflin Academy in 1866 and 1867 and was graduated from Illinois College at Jacksonville in 1868. He returned to Vandalia and engaged in mercantile pursuits. He served as county supervisor of Fayette County and as alderman of Vandalia. He served as delegate to numerous Republican state conventions. He served as member of the state House of Representatives in 1877 and 1878.

Remann was elected as a Republican to the Fifty-fourth Congress and served from March 4, 1895, until his death in Vandalia, Illinois, July 14, 1895, before the convening of Congress. He was interred in South Hill Cemetery.

== See also ==
- List of members of the United States Congress who died in office (1790–1899)

U.S. House of Representatives
Preceded by William S. Forman	Member of the U.S. House of Representatives from Illinois's 18th congressional district March 4, 1895 – July 14, 1895	Succeeded by William F. L. Hadley
