= Jessie Sumner =

American politician (1898–1994)

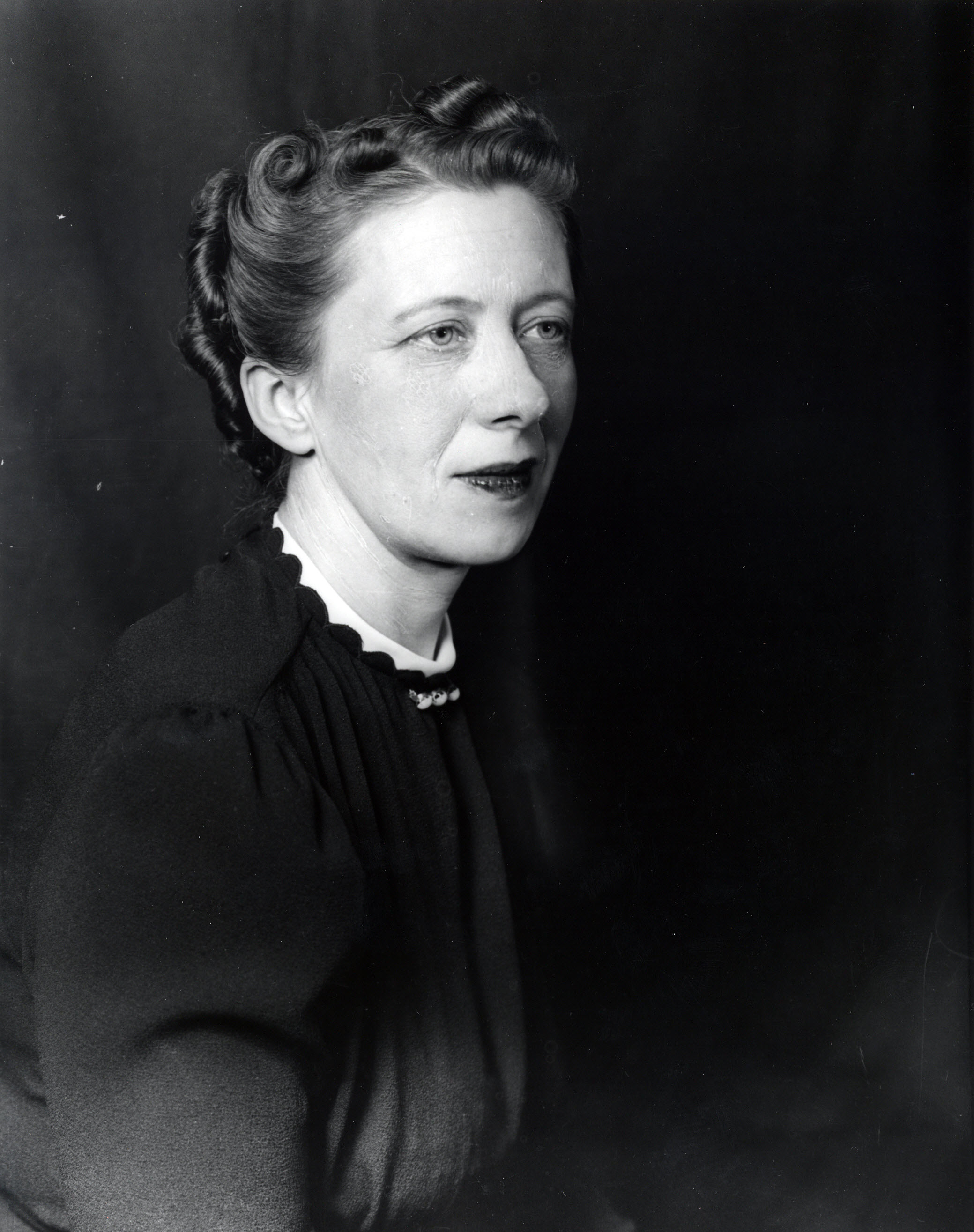

Member of the U.S. House of Representatives from Illinois's 18th district
- In office January 3, 1939 – January 3, 1947
- Preceded by: James A. Meeks
- Succeeded by: Edward H. Jenison

Judge of Iroquois County, Illinois
- In office December 8, 1937 – December 5, 1938
- Preceded by: John H. Gillan
- Succeeded by: Stephen C. Malo

Personal details
- Born: July 17, 1898 Milford, Illinois, U.S.
- Died: August 10, 1994 (aged 96) Watseka, Illinois, U.S.
- Resting place: Maple Grove Cemetery, Milford, Illinois, U.S.
- Party: Republican
- Education: Smith College
- Occupation: Attorney; Bank president

Jessie Sumner (July 17, 1898 – August 10, 1994) was an American attorney and banker from Illinois. A Republican, she served as a U.S. representative from 1939 to 1947.

== Early life ==
Jessie Sumner was born in Milford, Illinois on July 17, 1898, the daughter of Aaron Taylor Sumner and Jeannette Elizabeth (Gillan) Sumner. She attended the public schools of Milford and in 1916 she graduated from the Girton School in Winnetka, Illinois. She then attended Northampton, Massachusetts's Smith College, from which she graduated in 1920 with a AB degree in economics.

After college, Sumner studied law at the University of Chicago Law School, Columbia University, and Oxford University. She also studied briefly at the University of Wisconsin–Madison and the New York University School of Commerce in New York City. She was admitted to the bar in 1923 and practiced in Chicago, Illinois. In 1928, Sumner moved to New York City, where she was employed on the legal staff of the Chase National Bank. She returned to Milford, Illinois in 1932, resumed the practice of law, and was an unsuccessful Republican candidate for Iroquois County district attorney. Sumner also served as director of Sumner National Bank in Sheldon, of which her father was president.

== Later career ==
In December 1937, Sumner won a special election for judge of Iroquois County, filling the vacancy left by the death of her uncle John H. Gillan. She served until December 1938, when she resigned in preparation to assume her seat in the United States House of Representatives. In 1938, Sumner was elected to the U.S. House; she was reelected three times and served from January 3, 1939 to January 3, 1947, the 76th, 77th, 78th Congresses. During her congressional service, Sumner was known for her opposition to the presidency of Franklin D. Roosevelt. She was also an isolationist before World War II and opposed expansion of the navy and continuation of the pre-war draft. After the war, Sumner opposed the United Nations Relief and Rehabilitation Administration's efforts to rebuild Europe and Asia. She was not a candidate for renomination in 1946, and returned to her Illinois legal and banking interests.

After the end of her congressional term, Sumner resumed her position at Sumner National Bank, where she had been appointed as vice president in 1938. Following the death of her father, in 1966 she succeeded him as the bank's president, and she served until her death. She also managed her family's other business interests, including an insurance company, grain elevators and farms. Sumner died in Watseka, Illinois, on August 10, 1994. She was buried at Maple Grove Cemetery in Milford.

== See also ==
- Women in the United States House of Representatives

== Sources ==
- United States Congress. "Jessie Sumner (id: S001071)". Biographical Directory of the United States Congress.

U.S. House of Representatives
Preceded by James A. Meeks	Member of the U.S. House of Representatives from Illinois's 18th congressional district 1939-1947	Succeeded by Edward H. Jenison
