= 76th Illinois Infantry Regiment =

76th Regiment Illinois Volunteer Infantry
- Illinois state flag
- Active: August 22, 1862, to August 4, 1865
- Country: United States
- Allegiance: Union
- Branch: Infantry
- Engagements: Siege of Vicksburg; Holly Springs Raid; Jackson Expedition; Meridian Campaign; Battle of Fort Blakeley

The 76th Illinois Volunteer Infantry Regiment was an infantry regiment that served in the Union Army during the American Civil War.

== Service ==
The 76th Illinois Volunteer Infantry was organized at Kankakee, Illinois, and mustered into Federal service on August 22, 1862.

Upon being mustered, it was immediately ordered to Columbus, Kentucky, arriving on August 29, 1862, where it was equipped with the Pattern 1853 Enfield Rifled Muskets. It moved to Bolivar, Tennessee, in October, joining Ulysses S. Grant's Vicksburg Campaign. During this Period, the regiment operated around Holly Springs and Waterford, driving Confederate Forces Under Sterling Price Just Southwest of their positions.

In December 1862, following the raid on Hollow Springs by General Earl Van Dorn, the 76th was forced to retreat northward, facing difficulties along the way. The Regiment had survived from foraging before returning to Holly Springs in January 1863.

=== Operations in Vicksburg and The Mississippi. ===
After a Brief Stint at Memphis, the regiment embarked for the Vicksburg Campaign in May 1863. While moving down the Mississippi River, Their Transport was disabled by Guerilla Fire from the Arkansas Shore; The regiment responded by landing and then burning nearby plantations.

The 76th played a vital role in the Siege of Vicksburg, holding a position on the left of the besieging line until the city's surrender on July 4, 1863. Immediately after the victory, the regiment marched under Sherman to capture Jackson, Mississippi, where it occupied the extreme right of the Union line during the engagement.

The Regiment Later Took Part in the Meridian Campaign.

=== Mobile Campaign and Fort Blakely ===
In early 1865, it was transferred to the Department of the Gulf. After surviving a severe storm on the Gulf of Mexico, their transport was forced to change to jettison livestock and wagons.

On April 9, 1865, the same day Lee surrendered at Appomattox, the 76th participated in the battle of Fort Blakely, where their regiment's colors were the first to be planted on the enemy's works. The regiment suffered 98 casualties, including Colonel Busey, who was wounded leading the assault.

Following the fall of Mobile, the Regiment performed occupation duty in Selma, Alabama, and later in Galveston, Texas. The 76th Illinois was Mustered out on July 22, 1865, and was Discharged at Chicago On August 4, 1865.

The regiment was discharged from service on August 4, 1865.

== Total strength and casualties ==
The regiment suffered 1 officer and 51 enlisted men who were killed in action or mortally wounded, and 2 officers and 205 enlisted men who died of disease, for a total of 259 fatalities.

== Commanders ==
- Colonel Alonzo W. Mack - Resigned January 7, 1863.
- Colonel Samuel Thompson Busey - Mustered out with the regiment.

== See also ==
- List of Illinois Civil War Units
- Illinois in the American Civil War
