= William Ralls Morrison =

American politician

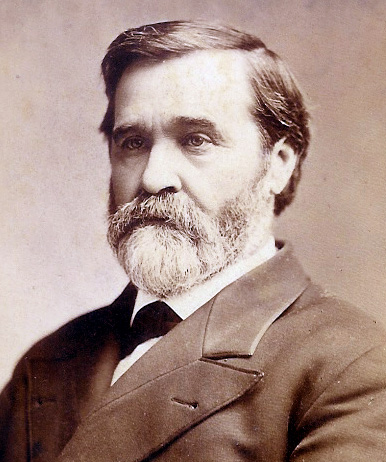
- Morrison C. 1896

Member of the U.S House of Representatives from Illinois
- In office March 4, 1863 – March 3, 1865
- Preceded by: District created
- Succeeded by: Jehu Baker
- Constituency: 12th district
- In office March 4, 1873 – March 3, 1887
- Preceded by: District created
- Succeeded by: Jehu Baker
- Constituency: 17th district (1873–83); 18th district (1883–87)

Member of the Illinois House of Representatives
- In office 1854-1860; 1870-1871

Personal details
- Born: September 14, 1824 Prairie du Long, Illinois, U.S.
- Died: September 29, 1909 (aged 85) Waterloo, Illinois, U.S.
- Party: Democratic
- Education: McKendree College
- Occupation: Military officer
- Profession: Politician, lawyer

William Ralls Morrison (September 14, 1824 – September 29, 1909) was an American politician who served as a U.S. representative from Illinois.

== Early life and career ==
Born on a farm at Prairie du Long, near the present town of Waterloo, Illinois, Morrison attended McKendree College in Lebanon, Illinois. He served in the war with Mexico before travelling to California with the gold seekers in 1849, but returned to Illinois in 1851. He studied law, was admitted to the bar in 1855, and practiced in Waterloo, Illinois. Morrison served as clerk of the circuit court of Monroe County, Illinois, from 1852 to 1854 and as member of the State house of representatives 1854–1860, 1870, and 1871; he served as speaker in 1859 and 1860.

== Personal life ==
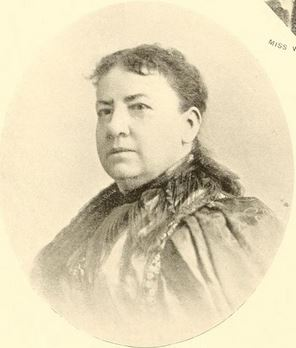
Eleanor Horan

Morrison married Eleanor Horan, whom he knew from childhood, when she was 17 and he was 27. Morrison was wounded at the Battle of Fort Donelson while serving with the Union Army during the American Civil War, and his wife nursed him back to health. During congressional sessions, the Morrisons resided at the Willard Hotel.

== Civil War service ==
In 1861, Morrison helped organize and was appointed colonel of the 49th Illinois Volunteer Infantry Regiment during the Civil War. Shortly after it was as mustered into service on December 31, 1861, the regiment was attached to Ulysses S. Grant's army at Cairo, Illinois. The 49th was formed into a brigade with 17th Illinois and two artillery batteries and, being the senior colonel, Morrison was placed in command of the brigade. Morrison's brigade was designated the 3rd Brigade, 1st Division, District of Cairo and joined Grant's expedition to Fort Henry. Morrison also participated in the Battle of Fort Donelson where his division commander, John A. McClernand, decided to seize a Confederate battery early in the engagement. McClernand selected Morrison's two regiments to lead the attack and decided to attach a third regiment from W.H.L. Wallace's brigade under Colonel Isham N. Haynie as support. However, Haynie outranked Morrison and decided to take command. Despite being the brigade's commander, Morrison deferred to Haynie. Haynie replied, "Colonel, let's take it together." Shortly after the battle started Morrison was shot in the hip, knocking him off his horse. He never returned to the field and resigned his commission on December 13, 1863.

== Congressional career ==
While in command of his regiment in the field, Morrison was elected as a Democrat to the Thirty-eighth Congress (March 4, 1863 – March 3, 1865). He was an unsuccessful candidate in 1864 for reelection to the Thirty-ninth Congress and in 1866 for election to the Fortieth Congress. He continued the practice of law in Waterloo, Illinois.

Morrison was elected to the Forty-third and to the six succeeding Congresses (March 4, 1873 – March 3, 1887). He served as chairman of the U.S. House Committee on Ways and Means (Forty-fourth, Forty-eighth, and Forty-ninth Congresses), Committee on Public Lands (Forty-fifth Congress), Committee on Expenditures in the Department of the Treasury (Forty-sixth Congress). In Congress, Morrison did not always follow the lead of the Democratic caucus or of the newly elected Democratic president—Grover Cleveland.

As head of Ways and Means, Morrison worked hard for tariff reform, without conspicuous success. His bill met with so much Democratic obstruction that it never reached a final vote in 1884, and the same was true in 1886. The opposition was led by Congressman Samuel J. Randall of Pennsylvania on the Democratic side, and there had been bad blood between the two men for almost a decade. In 1875, Morrison had favored Michael Kerr of Indiana for Speaker over Randall, and Randall, coming to the Speakership a year later, saw to it that Morrison was shut out of the Ways and Means Committee chairmanship henceforth. In 1883, when Randall sought re-election to the Speakership, Morrison organized the forces that elected John G. Carlisle of Kentucky instead. But their personal dislike was rooted in sharply different views of how protective the tariff ought to be, and Randall's ability, as Appropriations Committee chairman, to wield the influence among members against any reduction in rates was still considerable through 1886. One high-tariff Democrat described Morrison as "afflicted with economic flatulence and fiscal hydrophobia," firing off "putrid tariff phosphorescence from one end and finance and currency froth from the other." The tariff bill that Morrison wanted never even made it unscathed through the Ways and Means Committee. "Apparently there are many doctors attending the coming Tariff bill at the leader's bedside," the Secretary of the Treasury Daniel Manning wrote an old associate. "I am afraid of many deformities, and feel almost certain that it will not live long enough to grow out of the arms of its nurses." Nor did it. In June 1886, the House voted by 157 to 140 not to discuss the bill. Thirty-five Democrats voted with the protectionist majority, among them congressmen from the wool-growing and sugar-raising districts of Ohio and Louisiana; Alabama's members voted on behalf of the coal and iron interests of Birmingham.

=== Personality ===
Morrison was an unpretentious figure on the House floor. Weak-voiced (the shot through the lungs he sustained in the war never wholly lost its effect and his inveterate cigar smoking did not help much, either) and wholly lacking in personal magnetism, he was no orator and only a tolerable parliamentarian. A Washington correspondent likened him to "a village lawyer. He has all the airs of one, and his ten years in Congress and as long a time in the Illinois Legislature, have failed to make anything else out of him as far as personal appearance goes. He is a brawny, country-looking man, and you can almost fancy that you see the hayseed in his hair. He is slouchy in his dress, his black broadcloth coat being, as a rule, anything but new in appearance, and anything but a compliment to the tailor who was its author and finisher. He delights in a soft black hat, a 'slouch,' not in the newest fashion either, though to a friend who was chaffing him on it the other day he remarked that he had a good silk one at home." One onlooker complained that wherever he stood, even when he addressed the House, he kept his hands in his trouser pockets. "He seems to be eternally suffering from cold," he remarked. "Or maybe he is looking for thoughts in his pockets instead of his head. He is the most restless man on the floor of the House. He never occupies his own seat. He is constantly moving about, dropping into this seat, then another, suggesting an incarnation of the principle of perpetual motion." But members early came to find him careful, thoughtful, and a hard worker. They also declared him wholly trustworthy, and, wrote a former Illinois governor, "oine of the most truthful and trustworthy men." The radical Republican, Thaddeus Stevens of Pennsylvania, marked him as one of the best men on the opposition side, and, indeed, one of the best men of any party in a talented House."That man's word can be relied upon," he is alleged to have said. A Republican, who had no sympathy with Morrison's tariff views, pronounced him an able, honest man. "There is no trace of the demagogue about him," he told a reporter. "What he believes in he avows without hesitation. He is held in high esteem by the Republican side of the House."

== End of congressional career ==
He was an unsuccessful candidate for the United States Senate in 1885. When he was defeated for reelection in 1886 to the 50th United States Congress Congress, it came as something of a shock to his party, but to knowledgeable Illinois observers, the real shock was that defeat had come so late: Republicans had kept fiddling with his congressional district's boundaries to make it more firmly Republican, and to their dismay found that however the voters went in presidential races, they still went for Morrison in the congressional race. In 1886, however, the decisive factors may have been two: great tubs of money flushed into the campaign by the iron and steel industry's high tariff lobby and opposition from the Knights of Labor, itself committed to tariff protection. He served as delegate to the Democratic National Conventions in 1856, 1868, 1884 (serving as a favorite son candidate for President of the Illinois delegation in 1884), and 1888. He was also a delegate to the Union National Convention at Philadelphia in 1866.

== Late years ==
He was appointed in 1887 by President Cleveland to the Interstate Commerce Commission, reappointed by President Harrison on January 5, 1892, and served from March 22, 1887, to December 31, 1897. He was chairman of the commission from March 19, 1892, to the end of his term. He resumed the practice of law in Waterloo, Illinois, and died there September 29, 1909. He was interred in Waterloo Cemetery.

U.S. House of Representatives
Preceded by none	Member of the U.S. House of Representatives from Illinois's 12th congressional district 1863-1865	Succeeded by Jehu Baker
Preceded by none	Member of the U.S. House of Representatives from Illinois's 17th congressional district 1873-1883	Succeeded by Samuel W. Moulton
Preceded by John R. Thomas	Member of the U.S. House of Representatives from Illinois's 18th congressional district 1883-1887	Succeeded by Jehu Baker
