= Illinois's 18th congressional district =

U.S. House district for Illinois

Coordinates: 40°13′38″N 90°04′09″W

- Obsolete district
- Created: 1870
- Eliminated: 2020
- Years active: 1873–2023

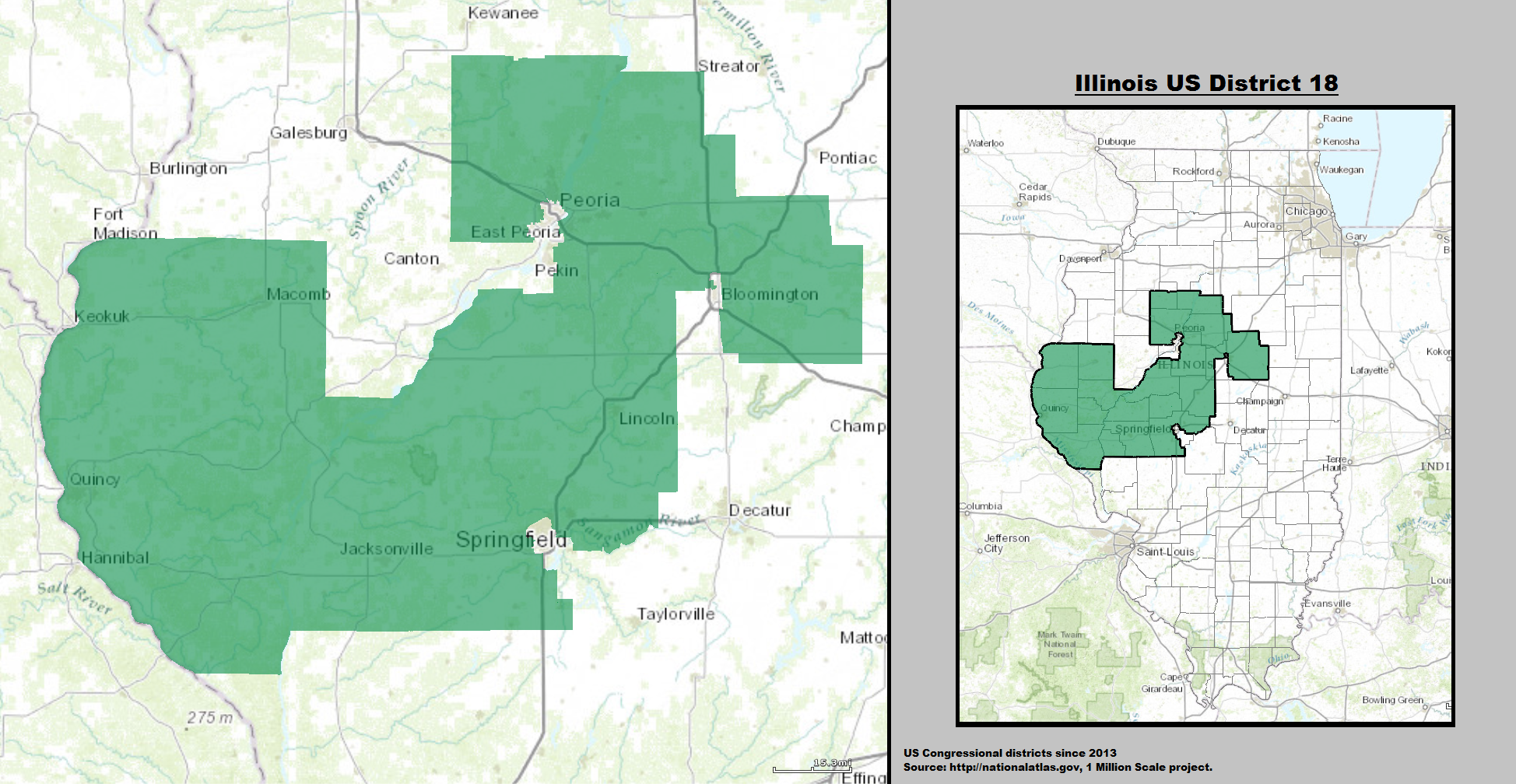
The district in its final form from 2013 to 2023

The 18th congressional district of Illinois covered central and western Illinois, including all of Jacksonville and Quincy and parts of Bloomington, Peoria, and Springfield. It covered much of the territory represented by Abraham Lincoln during his single term in the House.

It was last represented by Republican Darin LaHood, who took office in September 2015 following a special election.

Republican Aaron Schock previously represented the district from January 2009 until his resignation in March 2015. Darin LaHood is the son of Schock's predecessor, Ray LaHood, and was reelected in 2016, 2018, and 2020.

From 1949 to 2015, the district was always represented by an attendee or graduate of Bradley University. Due to reapportionment after the 2020 U.S. census, the 18th district was eliminated ahead of the 2022 elections.

== 2011 redistricting ==
The district covered parts of McLean, Peoria, Sangamon, Stark and Tazewell counties, and all of Adams, Brown, Cass, Hancock, Logan, Marshall, Mason, McDonough, Menard, Morgan, Pike, Schuyler, Scott and Woodford counties, as of the 2011 redistricting which followed the 2010 census. All or parts of Bloomington, Chatham, Jacksonville, Lincoln, Macomb, Morton, Normal, Peoria, Quincy and Springfield were included. The representatives for these districts were elected in the 2012 primary and general elections, and the boundaries became effective on January 5, 2013.

=== Future ===
Due to Illinois losing population in the 2020 United States census, the district was eliminated in January 2023.

== Election results from statewide races ==
Year	Office	Results
2008	President	McCain 54% - 44%
2012	President	Romney 61% - 37%
2016	President	Trump 60% - 33%
2016	Senate	Kirk 59% - 35%
2016	Comptroller (Spec.)	Munger 64% - 31%
2018	Governor	Rauner 55% - 33%
2018	Attorney General	Harold 65% - 32%
2018	Secretary of State	White 53% - 45%
2018	Comptroller	Senger 56% - 40%
2018	Treasurer	Dodge 57% - 40%
2020	President	Trump 61% - 37%
2020	Senate	Curran 60% - 37%

== List of members representing the district ==
Member	Party	Years	Cong ress	Electoral history
District created March 4, 1873
Isaac Clements (Carbondale)	Republican	March 4, 1873 – March 3, 1875	43rd	Elected in 1872. Lost re-election.
William Hartzell (Chester)	Democratic	March 4, 1875 – March 3, 1879	44th 45th	Elected in 1874. Re-elected in 1876. Retired.
John R. Thomas (Metropolis)	Republican	March 4, 1879 – March 3, 1883	46th 47th	Elected in 1878. Re-elected in 1880. Redistricted to the 20th district.
William R. Morrison (Waterloo)	Democratic	March 4, 1883 – March 3, 1887	48th 49th	Redistricted from the 17th district and re-elected in 1882. Re-elected in 1884. Lost re-election.
Jehu Baker (Belleville)	Republican	March 4, 1887 – March 3, 1889	50th	Elected in 1886. Lost re-election.
William S. Forman (Nashville)	Democratic	March 4, 1889 – March 3, 1895	51st 52nd 53rd	Elected in 1888. Re-elected in 1890. Re-elected in 1892. Retired.
Frederick Remann (Vandalia)	Republican	March 4, 1895 – July 14, 1895	54th	Elected in 1894. Died.
Vacant		July 14, 1895 – December 2, 1895	54th	
William F. L. Hadley (Edwardsville)	Republican	December 2, 1895 – March 3, 1897	54th	Elected to finish Remann's term. Lost re-election.
Thomas M. Jett (Hillsboro)	Democratic	March 4, 1897 – March 3, 1903	55th 56th 57th	Elected in 1896. Re-elected in 1898. Re-elected in 1900. Retired.
Joseph G. Cannon (Danville)	Republican	March 4, 1903 – March 3, 1913	58th 59th 60th 61st 62nd	Redistricted from the 12th district and re-elected in 1902. Re-elected in 1904. Re-elected in 1906. Re-elected in 1908. Re-elected in 1910. Lost re-election.
Frank T. O'Hair (Paris)	Democratic	March 4, 1913 – March 3, 1915	63rd	Elected in 1912. Lost re-election.
Joseph G. Cannon (Danville)	Republican	March 4, 1915 – March 3, 1923	64th 65th 66th 67th	Elected in 1914. Re-elected in 1916. Re-elected in 1918. Re-elected in 1920. Retired.
William P. Holaday (Georgetown)	Republican	March 4, 1923 – March 3, 1933	68th 69th 70th 71st 72nd	Elected in 1922. Re-elected in 1924. Re-elected in 1926. Re-elected in 1928. Re-elected in 1930. Lost re-election.
James A. Meeks (Danville)	Democratic	March 4, 1933 – January 3, 1939	73rd 74th 75th	Elected in 1932. Re-elected in 1934. Re-elected in 1936. Lost re-election.
Jessie Sumner (Milford)	Republican	January 3, 1939 – January 3, 1947	76th 77th 78th 79th	Elected in 1938. Re-elected in 1940. Re-elected in 1942. Re-elected in 1944. Retired.
Edward H. Jenison (Paris)	Republican	January 3, 1947 – January 3, 1949	80th	Elected in 1946. Redistricted to the 23rd district.
Harold H. Velde (Pekin)	Republican	January 3, 1949 – January 3, 1957	81st 82nd 83rd 84th	Elected in 1948. Re-elected in 1950. Re-elected in 1952. Re-elected in 1954. Retired.
Robert H. Michel (Peoria)	Republican	January 3, 1957 – January 3, 1995	85th 86th 87th 88th 89th 90th 91st 92nd 93rd 94th 95th 96th 97th 98th 99th 100th 101st 102nd 103rd	Elected in 1956. Re-elected in 1958. Re-elected in 1960. Re-elected in 1962. Re-elected in 1964. Re-elected in 1966. Re-elected in 1968. Re-elected in 1970. Re-elected in 1972. Re-elected in 1974. Re-elected in 1976. Re-elected in 1978. Re-elected in 1980. Re-elected in 1982. Re-elected in 1984. Re-elected in 1986. Re-elected in 1988. Re-elected in 1990. Re-elected in 1992. Retired.
Ray LaHood (Peoria)	Republican	January 3, 1995 – January 3, 2009	104th 105th 106th 107th 108th 109th 110th	Elected in 1994. Re-elected in 1996. Re-elected in 1998. Re-elected in 2000. Re-elected in 2002. Re-elected in 2004. Re-elected in 2006. Retired.
Aaron Schock (Peoria)	Republican	January 3, 2009 – March 31, 2015	111th 112th 113th 114th	Elected in 2008. Re-elected in 2010. Re-elected in 2012. Re-elected in 2014. Resigned.
Vacant		March 31, 2015 – September 10, 2015	114th	
Darin LaHood (Peoria)	Republican	September 10, 2015 – January 3, 2023	114th 115th 116th 117th	Elected to finish Schock's term. Re-elected in 2016. Re-elected in 2018. Re-elected in 2020. Redistricted to the 16th district.
District eliminated January 3, 2023

== Recent election results ==
=== 1994 ===
1994 Illinois's 18th congressional district election
Party	Candidate	Votes	%
Republican	Ray LaHood (incumbent)	119,838	60.47
Democratic	G. Douglas Stephens	78,332	39.53
Total votes		198,170	100.00
Republican hold			

=== 1996 ===
1996 Illinois's 18th congressional district election
Party	Candidate	Votes	%
Republican	Ray LaHood (incumbent)	143,110	59.25
Democratic	Mike Curran	98,413	40.75
Total votes		241,523	100.00
Republican hold			

=== 1998 ===
1996 Illinois's 18th congressional district election
Party	Candidate	Votes	%
Republican	Ray LaHood (incumbent)	158,175	100.00
Total votes		158,175	100.00
Republican hold			

=== 2000 ===
2000 Illinois's 18th congressional district election
Party	Candidate	Votes	%
Republican	Ray LaHood (incumbent)	173,706	67.06
Democratic	Joyce Harant	85,317	32.94
Total votes		259,023	100.00
Republican hold			

=== 2002 ===
2002 Illinois's 18th congressional district election
Party	Candidate	Votes	%
Republican	Ray LaHood (incumbent)	192,567	70.24
Total votes		192,567	100.00
Republican hold			

=== 2004 ===
2004 Illinois's 18th congressional district election
Party	Candidate	Votes	%
Republican	Ray LaHood (incumbent)	216,047	70.24
Democratic	Steve Waterworth	91,548	29.76
Total votes		307,595	100.00
Republican hold			

=== 2006 ===
2006 Illinois's 18th congressional district election
Party	Candidate	Votes	%
Republican	Ray LaHood (incumbent)	150,194	67.28
Democratic	Steve Waterworth	73,052	32.72
Total votes		223,246	100.00
Republican hold			

=== 2008 ===
Ray LaHood decided not to seek re-election in 2008 and was chosen by Barack Obama to serve as U.S. Secretary of Transportation. Illinois State Representative Aaron Schock of Peoria won the seat for the Republicans in the November 4, 2008 election. His main opponent was Democrat Colleen Callahan, of Kickapoo, a radio and television broadcaster. Green Party candidate and educator Sheldon Schafer, of Peoria, was in a distant third place on the ballot.

Illinois's 18th congressional district election, 2008
Party	Candidate	Votes	%
Republican	Aaron Schock	182,589	58.88
Democratic	Colleen Callahan	117,642	37.94
Green	Sheldon Schafer	9,857	3.18
Total votes		310,088	100.00
Republican hold			

=== 2010 ===
Illinois's 18th district general election, November 2, 2010
Party	Candidate	Votes	%
Republican	Aaron Schock (incumbent)	152,868	69.12
Democratic	Deirdre "DK" Hirner	57,046	25.79
Green	Sheldon Schafer	11,256	5.09
Total votes		221,170	100.00
Republican hold			

=== 2012 ===
Illinois's 18th congressional district, 2012
Party	Candidate	Votes	%
Republican	Aaron Schock (incumbent)	244,467	74.2
Democratic	Steve Waterworth	85,164	25.8
Total votes		329,631	100.0
Republican hold			

=== 2014 ===
Illinois's 18th congressional district, 2014
Party	Candidate	Votes	%
Republican	Aaron Schock (Incumbent)	184,363	74.7
Democratic	Darrel Miller	62,377	25.3
Total votes		246,740	100.0
Republican hold			

=== 2015 special election ===
Illinois's 18th congressional district special election, 2015
Party	Candidate	Votes	%
Republican	Darin LaHood	35,329	68.8
Democratic	Rob Mellon	15,979	31.1
Write-In	Constant "Conner" Vlakancic	7	>0.0
Write-In	Roger K. Davis	4	>0.0
Total votes		51,319	100
Republican hold			

=== 2016 ===
Illinois's 18th congressional district, 2016
Party	Candidate	Votes	%
Republican	Darin LaHood (incumbent)	250,506	72.1
Democratic	Junius Rodriguez	96,770	27.9
Independent	Don Vance (write-in)	7	0.0
Total votes		347,283	100.0
Republican hold			

=== 2018 ===
Illinois's 18th congressional district, 2018
Party	Candidate	Votes	%
Republican	Darin LaHood (incumbent)	195,927	67.2
Democratic	Junius Rodriguez	95,486	32.8
Total votes		291,413	100.0
Republican hold			

=== 2020 ===
Illinois's 18th congressional district, 2020
Party	Candidate	Votes	%	±%
Republican	Darin LaHood (incumbent)	261,840	70.41	+3.18%
Democratic	George Petrilli	110,039	29.59	−3.18%
Total votes		371,879	100.0	
Republican hold				

== Historical district boundaries ==
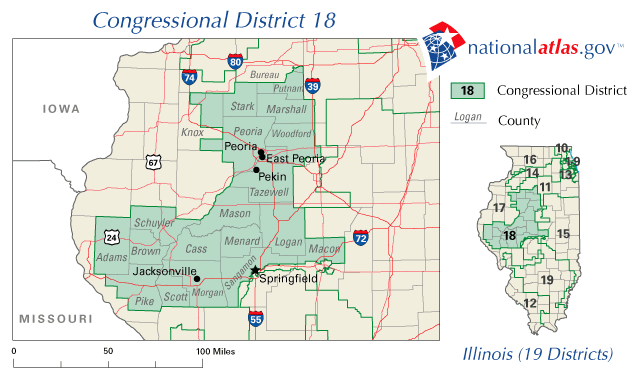
2003–2013

== See also ==
- Illinois's congressional districts
- List of United States congressional districts

U.S. House of Representatives
Preceded by Iowa's 3rd congressional district	Home district of the speaker of the House; November 9, 1903 – March 4, 1911	Succeeded by Missouri's 9th congressional district
