= Thomas M. Jett =

American politician

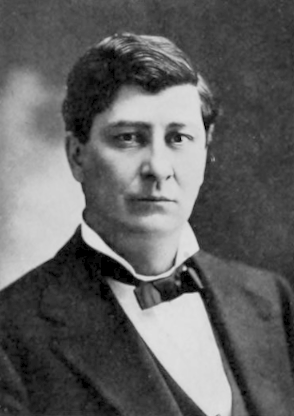

Member of the U.S. House of Representatives from Illinois's 18th district
- In office March 4, 1897 – March 3, 1903
- Preceded by: William F. L. Hadley
- Succeeded by: Joseph Gurney Cannon

Personal details
- Born: May 1, 1862 Greenville, Illinois, U.S.
- Died: January 10, 1939 (aged 76) Litchfield, Illinois, U.S.
- Party: Democratic

Thomas Marion Jett (May 1, 1862 – January 10, 1939) was a U.S. representative from Illinois.

== Biography ==
Born near Greenville, Illinois, Jett attended the common schools and the Northern Indiana Normal School, Valparaiso, Indiana, for two years. He taught school in Bond and Montgomery Counties, Illinois. He studied law. He was admitted to the bar in 1887 and commenced practice in Nokomis, Illinois. He moved to Hillsboro, Illinois, and served as prosecuting attorney of Montgomery County 1889-1896.

Jett was elected as a Democrat to the Fifty-fifth, Fifty-sixth, and Fifty-seventh Congresses (March 4, 1897 – March 3, 1903). He was not a candidate for renomination in 1902. He resumed the practice of law in Hillsboro, Illinois. He was also interested in agricultural pursuits. He served as a delegate to the Democratic National Conventions in 1900 and 1908. He was elected as a judge of the circuit court, fourth judicial district of Illinois, in 1909. He was reelected in 1915, 1921, 1927, and 1935 and served until his death. He was a member of the appellate court of the second district of Illinois 1922-1936.

He died in Litchfield, Illinois, January 10, 1939. He was interred in Oak Grove Cemetery, Hillsboro.

U.S. House of Representatives
Preceded by William F. L. Hadley	Member of the U.S. House of Representatives from Illinois's 18th congressional district 1897–1903	Succeeded by Joseph G. Cannon
