= Joseph Gurney Cannon =

American politician (1836–1926)

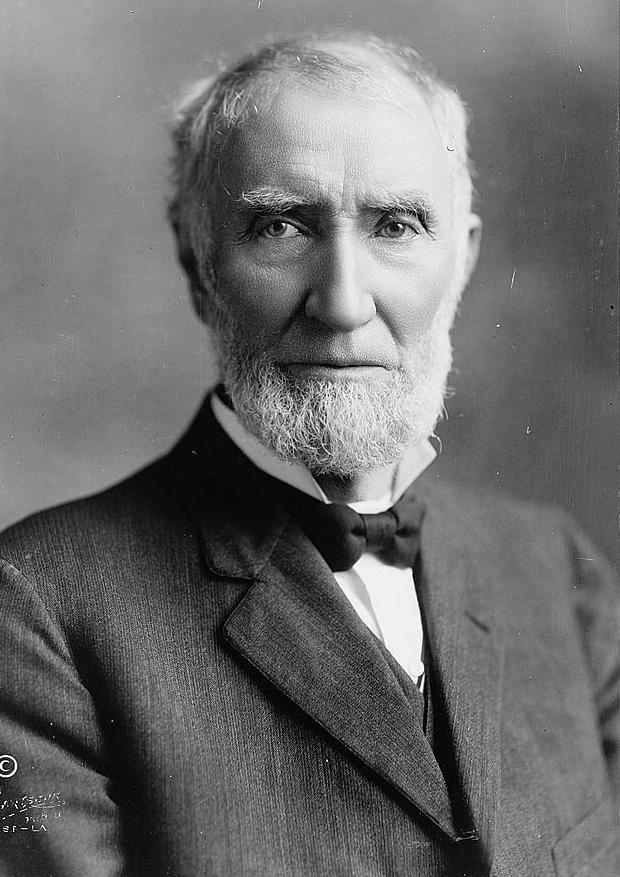
- Cannon c. 1909–1923

35th Speaker of the United States House of Representatives
- In office November 9, 1903 – March 3, 1911
- Preceded by: David B. Henderson
- Succeeded by: Champ Clark

Leader of the House Republican Conference
- In office November 9, 1903 – March 3, 1911
- Preceded by: David B. Henderson
- Succeeded by: James Robert Mann

Chairman of the House Republican Conference
- In office March 4, 1899 – March 3, 1903
- Speaker: David B. Henderson
- Preceded by: Charles H. Grosvenor
- Succeeded by: William P. Hepburn
- In office March 4, 1883 – March 3, 1889
- Speaker: John G. Carlisle
- Preceded by: George M. Robeson
- Succeeded by: Thomas J. Henderson

Member of the U.S. House of Representatives from Illinois
- In office March 4, 1873 – March 3, 1891
- Preceded by: District created
- Succeeded by: Samuel T. Busey
- Constituency: 14th district (1873–1883); 15th district (1883–1891)
- In office March 4, 1893 – March 3, 1913
- Preceded by: Samuel T. Busey
- Succeeded by: Frank Trimble O'Hair
- Constituency: 15th district (1893–1895); 12th district (1895–1903); 18th district (1903–1913)
- In office March 4, 1915 – March 3, 1923
- Preceded by: Frank Trimble O'Hair
- Succeeded by: William P. Holaday
- Constituency: 18th district

Personal details
- Born: May 7, 1836 Guilford County, North Carolina, U.S.
- Died: November 12, 1926 (aged 90) Danville, Illinois, U.S.
- Party: Republican
- Spouse: Mary P. Reed (m. 1862)
- Children: 2
- Education: University of Cincinnati
- Profession: Politician • lawyer

Joseph Gurney Cannon (May 7, 1836 – November 12, 1926) was an American politician from Illinois and a leader of the Republican Party. Cannon represented parts of Illinois in the United States House of Representatives for twenty-three non-consecutive terms between 1873 and 1923; upon his retirement, he was the longest serving member of the United States Congress ever. From 1903 to 1911, he presided as Speaker of the House, becoming one of the most powerful speakers in United States history.

As the Speaker during most of the presidencies of Theodore Roosevelt and William Howard Taft, Cannon was an obstacle to the progressive policies advanced by Roosevelt and later abandoned by Taft. A revolt against Cannon's authority as Speaker, led by George W. Norris, was a contributing factor to the Republican Party split in the elections of 1910 and 1912 and led to significant reforms to the House rules.

The Cannon House Office Building, the oldest congressional office building, was named for him in 1962.

== Early life and education ==
Cannon was born in Guilford County, North Carolina. on May 7, 1836. He was the elder of two sons of Horace Franklin Cannon, a country doctor, and Gulielma Cannon (née Hollingsworth).

The Cannon family were Quakers and, like most members of their faith, opposed to slavery. Abhorring the practice and fearing war, the Cannons were among the many Quakers who left the South for the Western frontier. In 1840, his family moved west with other North Carolina Quakers, settling about 30 miles north of Terre Haute along the Wabash River. Their new settlement became Annapolis, Indiana. Horace Cannon drowned on August 7, 1851, as he tried to reach a sick patient by crossing a creek. Joe Cannon, aged fifteen, became head of the family and took charge of the family farm. He worked as a clerk in a country store to save money and, after five years, the family were able to pay their mortgage.

Cannon became fascinated by the law when asked to testify in a slander case on behalf of a friend represented by John Palmer Usher. He studied under Usher at his Terre Haute office and used the remainder of his savings to enroll in law school at the University of Cincinnati. In 1858, he was admitted to the bar and commenced practice in Terre Haute, Indiana, but was disappointed when Usher refused to offer him a place in his office. He relocated to Shelbyville, Illinois but failed to attract clients, and from there moved on to Tuscola, county seat of the newly organized Coles County. His choice of a new hometown was involuntary; while travelling from Shelbyville to Chicago to find more clients, he ran out of money. He boarded a Chicago-bound train in Mattoon but was removed from the train in Tuscola after failing to show a ticket.

While building his law practice, Cannon became a follower of Abraham Lincoln during the Lincoln–Douglas debates of 1858. He launched his first campaign for the office of state's attorney for Coles County in 1860 but was defeated. However, he was elected in 1861 as state's attorney for the twenty-seventh judicial district, after the Republican legislature reformed the state judicial system. Cannon remained in that position until 1872, when he was elected to the U.S. House.

== Early House career ==
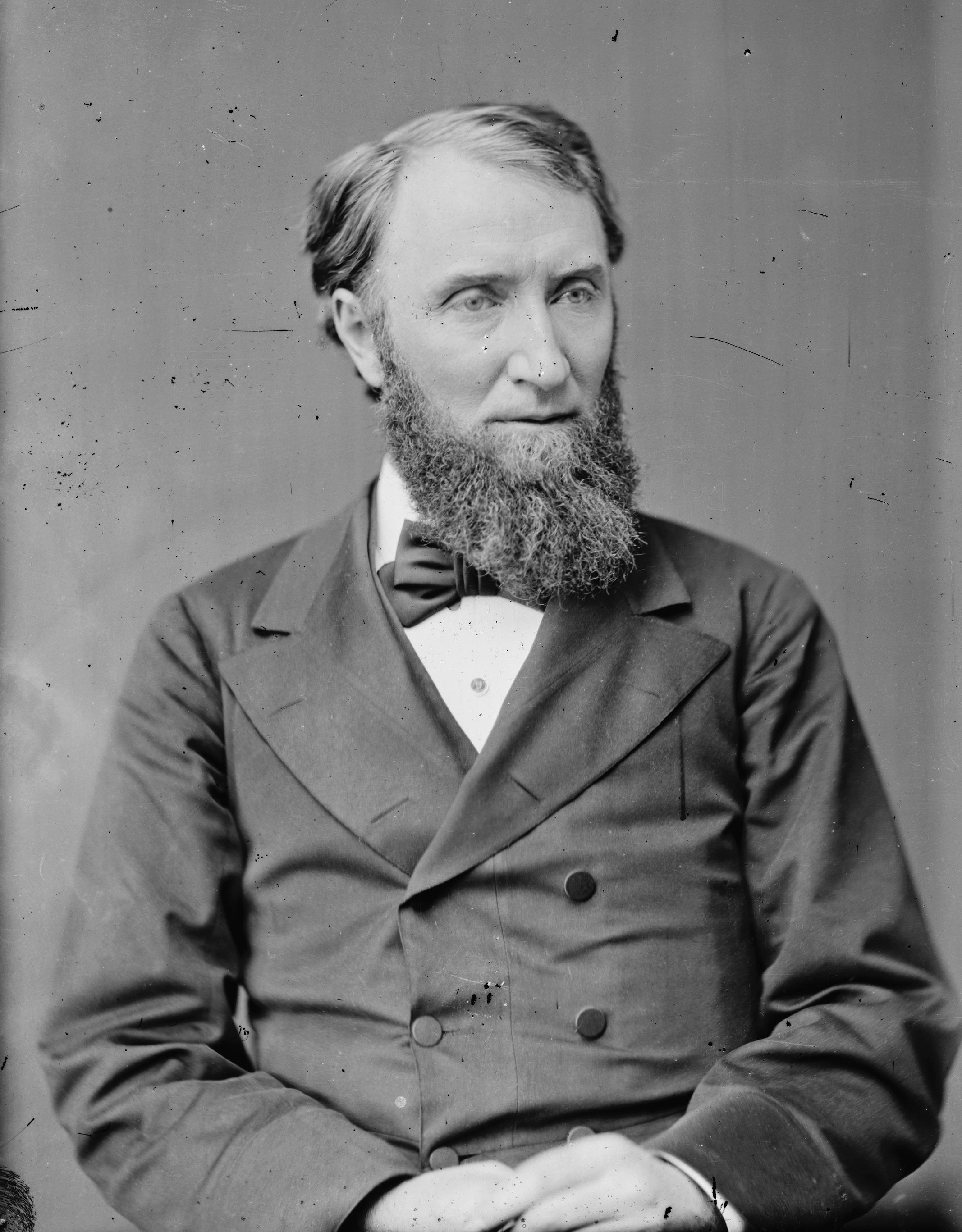
Cannon as a younger congressman c. 1875–1880

In 1872, Cannon ran for the U.S. House as an anti-reform candidate supportive of President Ulysses S. Grant. He later recalled it as "a reform year, the beginning of a decade of 'reform' which shook up the virtues as well as the vices of the people. Nothing was right and nobody was safe from the reformers." Despite this, Cannon was elected to represent Illinois's 14th district, which included nearby Danville, in the 43rd Congress.

Initially, Cannon focused on purely local issues. He secured an appointment to the Committee on Post Offices and Post Roads, from which he promoted a bill to provide that postage on newspapers and magazines should be prepaid by publishers, rather than by the subscribers after arrival. Despite opposition from the publishing industry, the measure passed both houses of Congress and became law. His maiden speech in the House was a defense of this bill and the free mailing of seed. Upon a remark by William Walter Phelps that Cannon "must have oats in his pocket," the freshman Representative exclaimed, "Yes! I have oats in my pocket and hayseed in my hair, and the Western people generally are affected the same way. And we expect that the seed, being good, will yield a good crop." The incident gained Cannon an instant national reputation as an advocate for farmers, though he would frequently bemoan that the press treated him as a caricature, rather than giving serious consideration to his legislative proposals.

In 1889, Cannon stood as a candidate for Speaker of the House, but finished a poor third behind Thomas Brackett Reed and William McKinley. Instead, Cannon was named (alongside Reed and McKinley) to the powerful Committee on Rules. As his career progressed, Cannon had gained a reputation for partisan loyalty which was made evident in the 51st Congress. For example, he led opposition within the Republican Party to the Lodge Federal Elections Bill, but after the party caucus approved the bill by one vote, Cannon aided Speaker Reed in passing the bill on an expedited process by a party-line vote. Likewise, when Reed introduced dramatic reforms to the House Rules, Cannon vigorously pressed the issue both in committee and in the whole House. As a consequence of his efforts, Cannon was among the many House Republicans unseated in the 1890 elections.

Cannon was out of office for only one term; he was elected again in 1892. After Reed's abrupt retirement in 1899, Cannon stood again for the Speakership but was defeated by David B. Henderson of Iowa. Cannon finally became Speaker in 1903, at the start of the 58th Congress. From 1895 until he became Speaker, Cannon chaired the powerful Appropriations Committee.

== Speaker of the House (1903–1911) ==
=== Theodore Roosevelt presidency ===
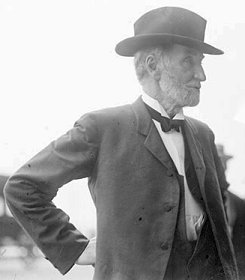
Cannon at the 1904 Republican National Convention in Chicago, where Theodore Roosevelt was nominated for a full term in office.

At the time Cannon was elevated to Speaker, the President was Theodore Roosevelt, a fellow Republican. Roosevelt immediately took steps to consult Cannon on legislative matters and the two met several times a week at Roosevelt's request. However, unlike Roosevelt, Cannon opposed most of the progressive reform efforts of the day, including conservation, women's suffrage, the labor movement, and especially reductions in the overall tariff rate. Cannon also came to personally oppose Roosevelt's demanding, autocratic personality, once asserting that Roosevelt had "no more use for the Constitution than a tomcat has for a marriage license." On another occasion, he said, "That fellow at the other end of the Avenue wants everything from the birth of Christ to the death of the devil."

At the time of Cannon's election, the Speaker of the House concurrently held the chair of the Rules Committee, which determined under what rules and restrictions bills could be debated, amended, and voted on, and, in some cases, whether they would be allowed on the floor at all. As such, Cannon effectively controlled every aspect of the House's agenda: bills reached the floor of the House only if Cannon approved of them, and then in whatever form he determined – with Cannon himself deciding whether and to what extent the measures could be debated and amended. Cannon also reserved to himself the right to appoint not only the chairs of the various House committees, but also all of the committees' members, and (despite the seniority system that had begun to develop) used that power to appoint his allies and proteges to leadership positions while punishing those who opposed his legislation.

Cannon wielded the Speaker's authority with unprecedented severity. While his predecessor Thomas Brackett Reed was noted for his dramatic expansion of the Speaker's authority, Cannon distinguished himself by the manner in which he wielded that authority. According to historian Booth Mooney, "The deadly rapier wielded by Reed gave way to a bludgeon, which at first he used only to knock down Democrats." Though Reed had been lampooned as a "Czar," press treatment of "Uncle Joe" Cannon was far more critical during his first term as Speaker. Cannon was criticized by the Democratic press for the arbitrary exercise of his considerable power; on one voice vote, he ruled, "The ayes make the most noise, but the nays have it." On another occasion, Representative Cordell Hull attempted to offer an income tax amendment to a tariff bill, and Cannon simply ignored him. When one Representative was asked by a constituent for a copy of the House Rules, the Representative simply sent back a picture of Speaker Cannon. When confronted with criticisms directly, Cannon would respond that the power he exercised was granted by the whole House, which reserved the authority to amend the Rules or vote him out as Speaker.

Early in his term, Cannon was largely free from opposition within the House majority. His wrath was typically reserved for the Senate, and in conference committees he was a vigorous defender of the House position on legislation, winning him support and admiration from his colleagues. He continued to enjoy the public support of the President, who praised him in 1906 as "a patriotic American... for every man, rich or poor, capitalist or labor man, so long as he is a decent American, and [Cannon] is entitled to our support because he is a patriotic man."

After the 1906 election, the relationship between Cannon and Roosevelt began to fray. Roosevelt, who had already announced he would not campaign in 1908, adopted a more progressive stance against major corporations. Roosevelt's new proposals for a Pure Food and Drug Act, an income tax, an inheritance tax, a federal corporation law, government involvement in labor disputes, laws regulating the labor of women and children, and regulation of railroad securities all drew opposition from Cannon. Quoting John Morley, Cannon began to frequently refer to Roosevelt as "half St. Paul, half St. Vitus." Rumors began to spread that Roosevelt would look to supplant Cannon as speaker, in order to hasten his legislative agenda through the House, but Roosevelt never addressed them, and Cannon survived as Speaker through Roosevelt's term in office.

=== William Howard Taft presidency ===
==== 1908 elections ====
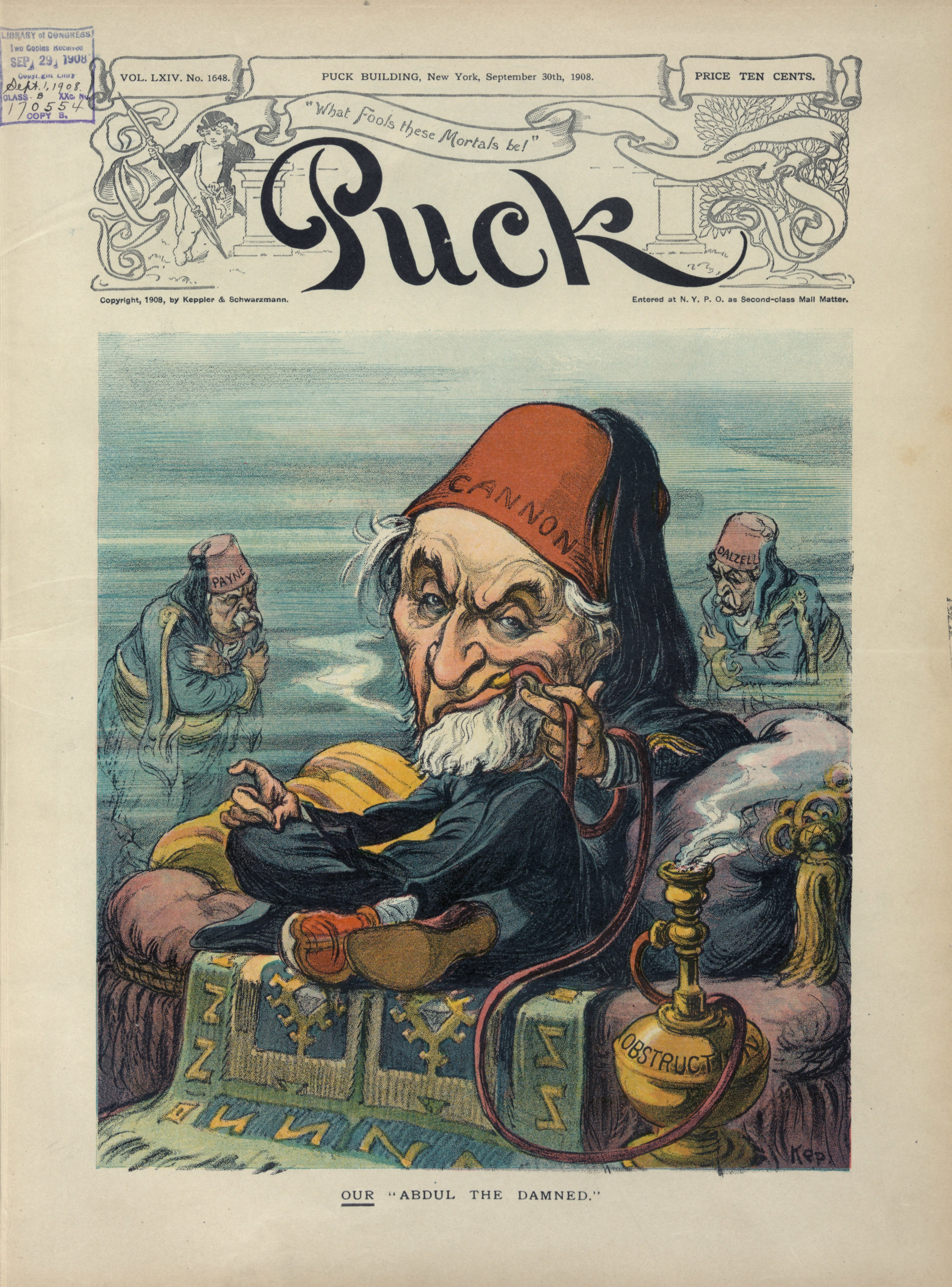
The cover of Puck for September 30, 1908, satirizing Cannon as "Abdul the Damned," the Ottoman sultan and subject of frequent assassination and deposition attempts.

As early as 1905, Cannon had expressed confidence that he was a contender for the 1908 presidential nomination. Ultimately, Roosevelt was able to maneuver the delegates at the 1908 Republican National Convention in support of William Howard Taft, his Secretary of War. Cannon received 51 of the 54 Illinois delegates and a handful from other states, finishing a distant fourth. Taft was nominated easily on the first ballot. Nevertheless, Cannon was influential at the convention, engineering the party platform and the nomination of conservative James S. Sherman of New York, one of his strongest House allies, for vice president.

During the 1908 campaign, Cannon came under heavy fire from the press, which denounced him as a tyrant and obstacle to every piece of progressive legislation introduced in the prior thirty years. One cartoon depicted him as the "Unrepentant Defendant" in the court trial of "Predatory Wealth" for its victimization of "The Common People." For his part, Cannon attributed the newspaper opposition to his refusal to support Roosevelt's proposal to permit the duty-free importation of newsprint and wood pulp, as well as his very first House bill which passed the cost of magazine and newspaper subscriptions to publishers.

The Democratic Party seized on the issue of House reform, stating in their party platform, "The House of Representatives, as controlled in recent years by the Republican party, has ceased to be a deliberative and legislative body, responsive to the will of a majority of its members, but has come under the absolute domination of the Speaker, who has entire control of its deliberations and powers of legislation. ... Legislative government becomes a failure when one member, in the person of the Speaker, is more powerful than the entire body." William Jennings Bryan, the Democratic nominee for president, and labor leader Samuel Gompers each visited Illinois to campaign against Cannon's re-election. Even some Republicans, including Nebraska representative George W. Norris, campaigned against "Cannonism." Taft himself privately admitted, "the great weight I have to carry in this campaign is Cannonism." Nevertheless, Taft and the Republicans won an easy victory in the fall elections; Norris, who had distinguished himself as an intra-party rival to Cannon's power, won re-election by only 22 votes.

==== 1910 rules revolt ====
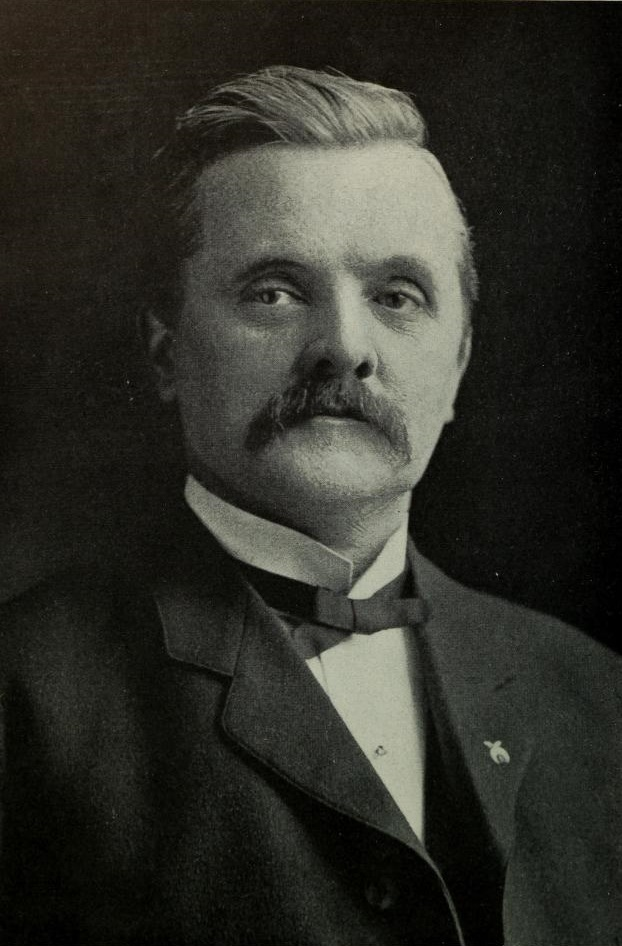
Representative George W. Norris of Nebraska led the "Insurgents," a loose group of progressive House Republicans opposed to Cannon's leadership.

When the 61st Congress met in March 1909, Roosevelt and Taft agreed that Cannon could not be removed as Speaker. The large Republican majority carried him to another term in office, though a core of twelve "Insurgent" members refused to vote for him. However, the new Democratic floor leader, Champ Clark, forced a roll-call vote on the usually uncontested vote to adopt the rules of the previous Congress. An amendment was ultimately adopted, with Democratic and Insurgent votes, to revise certain rules, including the introduction of a unanimous consent calendar for those bills which were not contested. In retaliation, Cannon removed three Insurgents from committee chairs and moved others to less significant committees. To the press, Cannon said, "Judas was an insurgent and sold his Master for thirty pieces of silver. I have no doubt he would have been applauded by the newspapers in Jerusalem had there been any in that day."

As Cannon's power continued to expand, his relationship with Taft continued to decline. Taft stayed out of House business, neither aiding nor opposing Cannon, but he privately noted that it was his wish to have Cannon removed. Cannon likewise grew critical of Taft, particularly after his elevation of Edward Douglass White, a Catholic Democrat, as Chief Justice of the Supreme Court. A growing movement within the Republican Party came to support Cannon's removal as Speaker, for pragmatic reasons; Henry Cabot Lodge advised Roosevelt that the Republicans would lose the House if Cannon remained, Taft expressed that such removal would "accord... with the welfare of the Republican party," and various Republican newspapers suggested his resignation as Speaker or even from Congress. In the face of growing opposition, Cannon grew defiant. He said, "I will say positively that I will not retire from Congress until my constituents fail to give me a majority." In one public meeting, he pulled open his coat and shouted, "Behold Mr. Cannon, the Beelzebub of Congress! Gaze on this noble manly form—me, Beelzebub! Me, the Czar!" Of the Insurgents, he remarked that they were "dishonest and disgruntled"; he accused them of introducing demagogic bills which would never be approved, then telling the "ignorant element" of their constituents that Cannon had personally stopped the bill, "thus creating the belief that the Speaker was a 'Czar' and controlled by the 'interests.'"

On March 16, 1910, Cannon's power began to crack when the House voted against his ruling on a matter of procedure. Edgar Crumpacker, chair of the Committee on the Census, introduced a joint resolution regarding the upcoming census. Though the resolution was not in the order of business, Crumpacker argued that the matter was constitutionally privileged, as the census was mandated by the Constitution, and the Constitution overrode any House rule. Cannon ruled in favor of the argument, but the House majority voted not to sustain his ruling. It was rare for the House to reject a Speaker's ruling, and Cannon bitterly remarked that his "face [had been] rubbed in the sand." Sensing an opening, George Norris took the opportunity. The next day, Norris introduced a prepared resolution to create a new Rules Committee with fifteen members, all elected by the House. The Speaker, who had been the chair of the Rules Committee ex officio since 1880, would be barred from membership, thus placing the Committee (and ostensibly the House) above the Speaker's authority, with the power to revise that authority. Like Crumpacker, Norris claimed his resolution was constitutionally privileged under Article I, Section 5: "Each House may determine the Rules of its Proceedings..." and therefore should be heard immediately by the whole House. Having used Cannon's own ruling against him, Norris placed the Speaker in a double-bind. Cannon immediately denounced the resolution as "anarchy under the color of law," but hurriedly withdrew to whip votes against it. His lieutenants delayed through dilatory tactics while loyal members returned to the Capitol, but after a weekend recess, Cannon proved unable to rally support to his side. On March 19, Cannon ruled Norris's resolution out of order, citing a long list of precedential rulings by prior Speakers, but the House again overruled him on appeal, by a vote of 182 to 163. The House immediately voted on the resolution itself, and it passed with 42 Republican and all 149 Democratic votes by the margin of 191 to 156. Cannon did maintain his position as Speaker by entertaining an immediate motion to vacate, which he won handily since the Republican majority would not risk a Democratic speaker replacing him. However, his iron rule of the House was broken.

The new Rules Committee, chaired by John Dalzell, passed a flurry of reforms, including a discharge rule empowering a majority to remove bills from committee and a "Calendar Wednesday," allowing committees to present bills otherwise blocked from consideration by the Speaker's scheduling. Despite the dramatic reduction in Cannon's powers, Republican prospects for the upcoming election did not improve. The Democrats won control of the House in the 1910 midterm elections for the first time since 1894; Cannon himself struggled for his re-election.

== Later House career ==
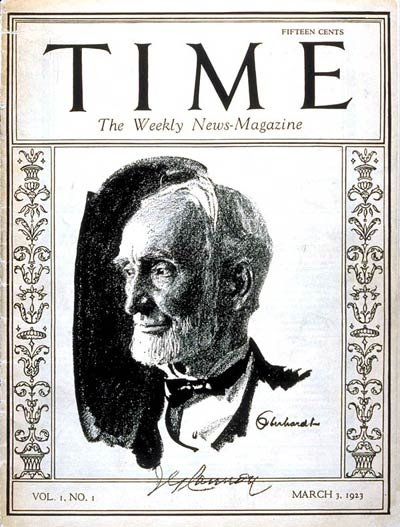
The inaugural cover of Time magazine featured Cannon on his last day in office, March 3, 1923.

After Republicans became the minority party in the House, Cannon refused to serve as minority leader. He returned as ranking member of the Appropriations Committee, which he had chaired before his term as Speaker. While as chair he had favored lower spending, as ranking member he presented numerous expenditure measures to the Democratic majority. When the Insurgents' revolt of 1910 evolved into the Republican Party split of 1912, Cannon was defeated for re-election. He returned in 1914 and was re-elected each congressional election until 1920. He was a critic of President Woodrow Wilson and U.S. entry into World War I. He was also an outspoken critic of Wilson's League of Nations.

Cannon declined to run in the 1922 congressional election and retired at the end of his last term in 1923; he was featured on the cover of the first issue of Time magazine on the last day of his last term in office.

== Personal life ==
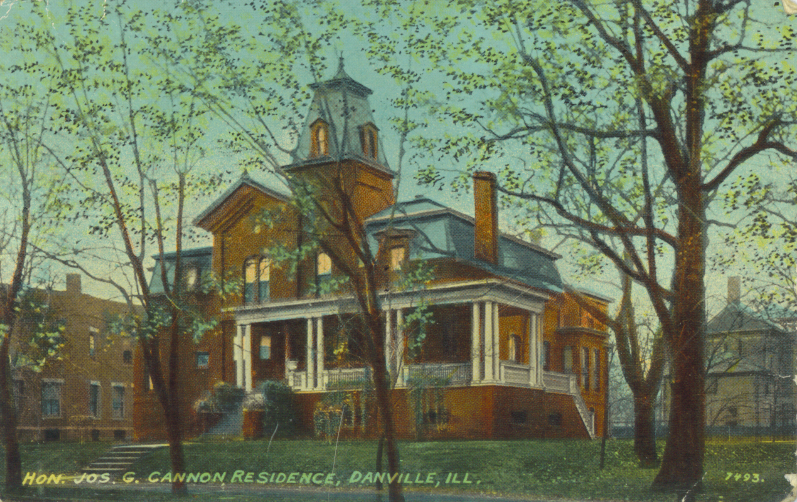
Cannon's residence in Danville, Illinois, c. 1913

Cannon was one of the charter members of Tuscola's Masonic Lodge No. 332, which was founded on October 2, 1860.

Cannon married Mary Reed in 1862. They had two daughters. In 1876, Cannon moved his family to Danville, Illinois, where he resided for the rest of his life.

Born a Quaker, he became a Methodist after leaving Congress. However, he may have been effectively a Methodist long before this. After marrying in a Methodist service, a Quaker encouraged him to express regret for this, to which Cannon replied, "If you mean that I am to get up in meeting and say that I am sorry I married Mary, I won't do it. I'm damned if I'm sorry and I'm damned if I will say I am."

Cannon died in his residence in Danville on November 12, 1926, while in a deep sleep. He had a weakened heart and also suffered from the general effects of old age. He was buried in Spring Hill Cemetery.

== Legacy ==
The first building of offices for congressmen outside of the United States Capitol building was named after Cannon.

=== Public image ===
His antic speaking style, diminutive stature and pugnacious manner were his trademarks. The newspapers frequently lampooned him as a colorful rube.

Despite his reputation for tyranny in the House, Cannon was well-liked by colleagues and friends in Washington, including members of the opposition.

=== Length of service ===
Cannon is to date the second longest-serving Republican Representative, surpassed only by Alaska congressman Don Young, and also was the first member of Congress of either party ever to surpass 40 years of service (non-consecutive). His congressional career spanned 46 years of cumulative service, a concurrent 50 years, barring two terms after which he came back—a record not broken until 1959. He is the longest-serving member ever of the House of Representatives in Illinois, although the longest continuous service belongs to Adolph J. Sabath. He served in the House during the terms of 11 presidents, a record he shares with John Dingell and Jamie Whitten.

Cannon is to date the second-longest continuously serving Republican Speaker in history, after another Illinoisan, Dennis Hastert, who surpassed him on June 1, 2006.

== See also ==
- Thomas Brackett Reed
- 1908 Republican National Convention
- 1908 United States presidential election
- List of Republican National Conventions

== Bibliography ==
- Bolles, Blair (1951). Tyrant from Illinois: Uncle Joe Cannon's Experiment with Personal Power. New York: Norton.
- Busbey, L. White (1927). Uncle Joe Cannon: The Story of a Pioneer American.
- Mooney, Booth (1964). Mr. Speaker: Four Men Who Shaped the United States House of Representatives. Chicago: Follett Pub. Co. pp. 89–129.
- Rager, Scott William (1998). "Uncle Joe Cannon: The Brakeman of the House of Representatives, 1903–1911". In Davidson, Roger H.; Hammond, Susan Webb; Smock, Raymond W. (eds.). Masters of the House: Congressional Leaders over Two Centuries. New York: Westview Press. pp. 33–62. ISBN 0813368944.

U.S. House of Representatives
Preceded by District created	Member of the U.S. House of Representatives from Illinois's 14th congressional district March 4, 1873 – March 3, 1883	Succeeded by Jonathan H. Rowell
Preceded by Samuel W. Moulton	Member of the U.S. House of Representatives from Illinois's 15th congressional district March 4, 1883 – March 3, 1891	Succeeded by Samuel T. Busey
Preceded by Samuel T. Busey	Member of the U.S. House of Representatives from Illinois's 15th congressional district March 4, 1893 – March 3, 1895	Succeeded by Benjamin F. Marsh
Preceded by John James McDannold	Member of the U.S. House of Representatives from Illinois's 12th congressional district March 4, 1895 – March 3, 1903	Succeeded by Charles Eugene Fuller
Preceded by Thomas M. Jett	Member of the U.S. House of Representatives from Illinois's 18th congressional district March 4, 1903 – March 3, 1913	Succeeded by Frank T. O'Hair
Preceded by Frank T. O'Hair	Member of the U.S. House of Representatives from Illinois's 18th congressional district March 4, 1915 – March 3, 1923	Succeeded by William P. Holaday
Preceded by David B. Henderson	Speaker of the U.S. House of Representatives; November 9, 1903 – March 3, 1911	Succeeded by Champ Clark
Honorary titles
Preceded by Isaac R. Sherwood	Oldest member of the U.S. House of Representatives; 1921–1923	Succeeded by Isaac R. Sherwood
