= 49th Illinois Infantry Regiment =

49th Regiment Illinois Volunteer Infantry
- Illinois state flag
- Active: December 31, 1861, to September 9, 1865
- Country: United States
- Allegiance: Union
- Branch: Infantry
- Engagements: Capture of Fort Donelson; Battle of Shiloh; Siege of Corinth; Battle of Pleasant Hill; Meridian Campaign; Battle of Nashville

The 49th Regiment Illinois Volunteer Infantry was an infantry regiment that served in the Union Army during the American Civil War.

== Service ==
The 49th Illinois Infantry was organized at Camp Butler, Illinois, and mustered into federal service on December 31, 1861.

On February 3, 1862, it was ordered to Cairo, and then moved to Fort Henry on February 8, where it was assigned to the Third Brigade of McClernand's Division, it moved to Fort Donelson to take part in the Battle of Fort Donelson, losing 14 killed and 37 Wounded. Among the Wounded was Colonel Morrison, It Remained at Fort Donelson until March 4, when it embarked for Pittsburg Landing.

The regiment took part in the Battle of Shiloh, losing 17 Killed and 99, it later participated in the Siege of Corinth, Later moving to Bethel on June 4 and was attached to Logan's First Division of the District of Jackson.

the regiment moved to Helena, Arkansas on August 21, to take part in the Little Rock Campaign, later participating in the capture of the city, it later moved to DeValls's Bluff before moving back to Memphis on November 21, 1863. on January 15, 1864, three-fourths of the regiment re-enlisted as veterans, and was attached to the 3rd Brigade, 3rd Division of the XVI Corps, later taking part in the Red River Campaign, participating in the Battle of Pleasant Hill.

on January 27, the regiment moved to Vicksburg, Mississippi, taking part in the Meridian Campaign before returning to Vicksburg on March 3. On June 24, the regiment was given a Veteran furlough, with the men of the regiment returning back to Illinois. After the expiration of the furlough, the regiment rendezvoused at Centralia, Illinois, before moving back to Holly Springs, to rejoin the XVI Corps, later participating on the Oxford Expedition on August 12, and later returning to St. Louis on November 18, 1864.

The regiment arrived on Nashville, Tennessee, taking part in the Battle of Nashville, it was ordered to Paducah, Kentucky on December 24, to muster out the men who didn't re-enlist as veterans.

The regiment was mustered out on September 9, 1865.

== Total strength and casualties ==
The regiment suffered 7 officers and 72 enlisted men killed in action or mortally wounded, and 5 officers and 170 enlisted men who died of disease, totaling 254 fatalities.

== Commanders ==
- Colonel William Ralls Morrison - resigned on December 13, 1862.
- Colonel William A. Thrush - mustered out with the regiment.
- Colonel Phineas Pease

== See also ==
- List of Illinois Civil War Units
- Illinois in the American Civil War
