= Jehu Baker =

American politician (1822–1903)

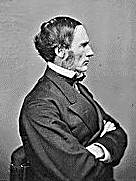

Member of the U.S. House of Representatives from Illinois
- In office March 4, 1865 – March 3, 1869
- Preceded by: William Ralls Morrison
- Succeeded by: John B. Hay
- Constituency: 12th district
- In office March 4, 1887 – March 3, 1889
- Preceded by: William Ralls Morrison
- Succeeded by: William St. John Forman
- Constituency: 18th district
- In office March 4, 1897 – March 3, 1899
- Preceded by: Everett J. Murphy
- Succeeded by: William A. Rodenberg
- Constituency: 21st district

United States Minister to Venezuela
- In office March 18, 1878 – September 5, 1881
- President: Rutherford B. Hayes; James A. Garfield
- Preceded by: Thomas Russell
- Succeeded by: George W. Carter
- In office May 16, 1882 – June 20, 1885
- President: Chester A. Arthur; Grover Cleveland
- Preceded by: George W. Carter
- Succeeded by: Charles L. Scott

Personal details
- Born: November 4, 1822 Lexington, Kentucky, U.S.
- Died: March 1, 1903 (aged 80) Belleville, Illinois, U.S.
- Party: Republican

Jehu Baker (November 4, 1822 – March 1, 1903) was a U.S. representative from Illinois.

Born near Lexington, Kentucky, Baker moved with his father to Lebanon, Illinois, in 1829. He attended the common schools and McKendree University. He studied law and was admitted to the bar in 1846, entering private practice in Belleville, Illinois. He served as master in chancery of St. Clair County, Illinois from 1861 to 1865.

Baker was elected as a Republican to the Thirty-ninth and Fortieth Congresses (March 4, 1865 – March 3, 1869), defeating incumbent William R. Morrison. He served as chairman of the Committee on Expenditures in the Post Office Department (Thirty-ninth Congress), Committee on Education and Labor (Fortieth Congress). In 1876, he campaigned in Illinois for Rutherford B. Hayes, who rewarded him by appointing him as United States Minister to Venezuela (1878–1881 and 1882–1885).

Baker was elected also as a Republican to the Fiftieth Congress (March 4, 1887 – March 3, 1889). He was an unsuccessful candidate for reelection in 1888 to the Fifty-first Congress. He continued the practice of law.

He later switched parties and was elected as a Democrat to the Fifty-fifth Congress (March 4, 1897 – March 3, 1899). He declined to be a candidate for renomination in 1898 to the Fifty-sixth Congress. He resumed the practice of law. He died in Belleville on March 1, 1903, and was buried in Walnut Hill Cemetery.

U.S. House of Representatives
Preceded by William R. Morrison	Member of the U.S. House of Representatives from Illinois's 12th congressional district March 4, 1865 – March 3, 1869	Succeeded by John B. Hay
Diplomatic posts
Preceded by Thomas Russell	U.S. Minister to Venezuela; March 8, 1878 – September 5, 1881	Succeeded by George W. Carter
Preceded by George W. Carter	U.S. Minister to Venezuela; May 16, 1882 – June 20, 1885	Succeeded by Charles L. Scott
U.S. House of Representatives
Preceded by William R. Morrison	Member of the U.S. House of Representatives from Illinois's 18th congressional district March 4, 1887 – March 3, 1889	Succeeded by William St. John Forman
Preceded by Everett J. Murphy	Member of the U.S. House of Representatives from Illinois's 21st congressional district March 4, 1897 – March 3, 1899	Succeeded by William A. Rodenberg
