= William P. Holaday =

American politician

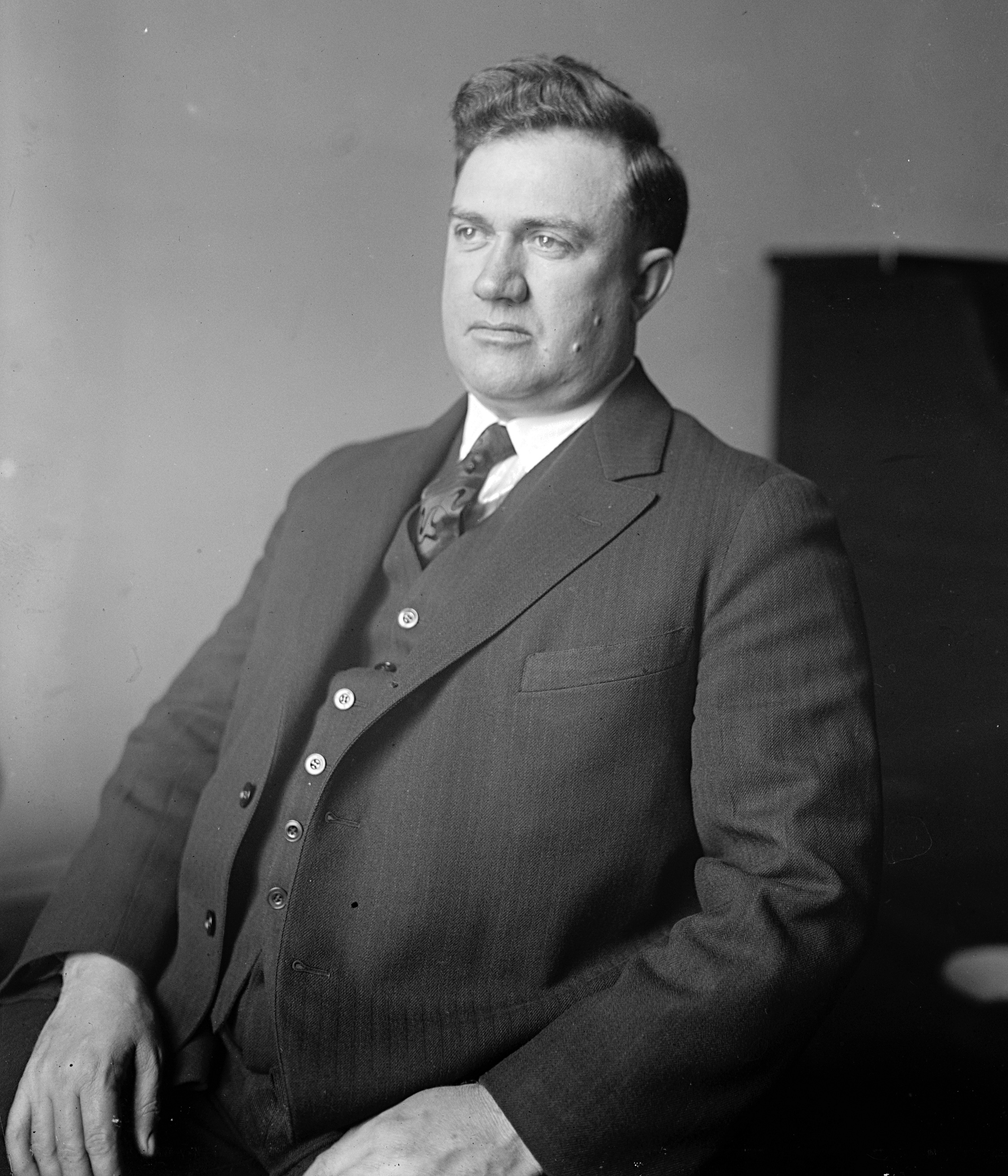

Member of the U.S. House of Representatives from Illinois's 18th district
- In office March 4, 1923 – March 3, 1933
- Preceded by: Joseph Gurney Cannon
- Succeeded by: James A. Meeks

Member of the Illinois House of Representatives
- In office 1909-1923

Personal details
- Born: December 14, 1882 Ridge Farm, Illinois, U.S.
- Died: January 29, 1946 (aged 63) Georgetown, Illinois, U.S.
- Party: Republican

William Perry Holaday (December 14, 1882 – January 29, 1946) was a U.S. representative from the state of Illinois.

== Biography ==
Holaday was born near Ridge Farm, Illinois. He attended the common schools and Vermilion Academy in nearby Vermilion Grove. He entered Penn College (now William Penn University) in Oskaloosa, Iowa, then transferred to the University of Missouri. Holaday received his law degree from the University of Illinois in 1905, and was admitted to the bar the same year. His initial legal practice was in Danville, Illinois.

Holaday served as assistant prosecuting attorney of Vermilion County from 1905 until 1907. He served as member of the State house of representatives from 1909 until 1923.

Holaday was elected as a Republican to the Sixty-eighth and to the four succeeding Congresses (March 4, 1923 – March 3, 1933). He was an unsuccessful candidate for reelection in 1932 to the Seventy-third Congress, after which he resumed the practice of Law in Danville.

Holaday died in Georgetown, Illinois on January 29, 1946. He was interred in Georgetown Cemetery.

U.S. House of Representatives
Preceded by Joseph G. Cannon	Member of the U.S. House of Representatives from Illinois's 18th congressional district 1923-1933	Succeeded by James A. Meeks
