= Everett J. Murphy =

American politician

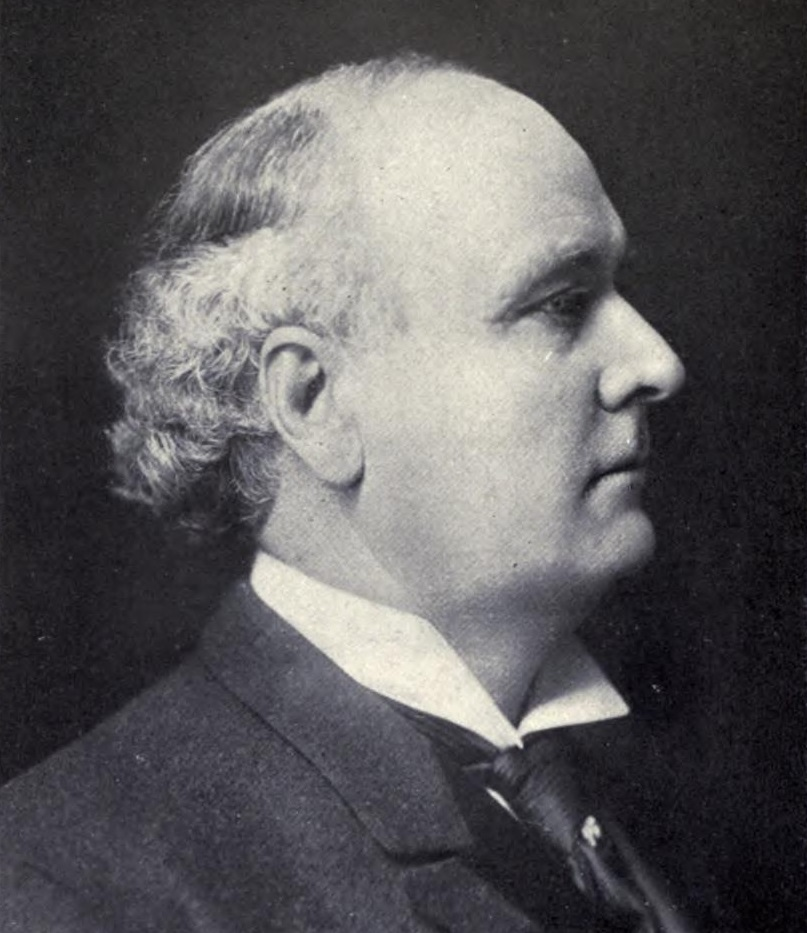
- From 1912's Notable Men of Illinois & Their State

Member of the U.S. House of Representatives from Illinois's 21st district
- In office March 4, 1895 – March 3, 1897
- Preceded by: District created
- Succeeded by: Jehu Baker

Personal details
- Born: July 24, 1852 Nashville, Illinois, U.S.
- Died: April 10, 1922 (aged 69) Joliet, Illinois, U.S.
- Party: Republican

Everett Jerome Murphy (July 24, 1852 – April 10, 1922) was a U.S. Representative from Illinois.

He was born in Nashville, Washington County, Illinois. Murphy moved with his parents to Sparta, Illinois when quite young. He attended the public and high schools. He worked as a city clerk for Sparta in 1877, but resigned in 1878 and moved to Chester, the county seat, to accept the appointment of deputy clerk of the circuit court. He also worked as a Sheriff for Randolph County. Murphy served as member of the Illinois House of Representatives from 1886 to 1888. Warden of the Southern Illinois Penitentiary at Menard, Illinois in 1889 and moved to East St. Louis, Illinois in 1892.

Murphy was elected as a Republican to the Fifty-fourth Congress (March 4, 1895 – March 3, 1897). He was an unsuccessful candidate for reelection in 1896 to the Fifty-fifth Congress and served as member of the state board of pardons from 1897 to 1899. He was the warden of the state penitentiary at Joliet from 1899 to 1913. He engaged in banking at Joliet, Illinois, reappointed warden of the penitentiary on July 1, 1917, and served until his death in Joliet on April 10, 1922. His interment was at Elmhurst Cemetery.

U.S. House of Representatives
| Preceded by District created | Member of the U.S. House of Representatives from Illinois's 21st congressional district 1895-1897 | Succeeded by Jehu Baker |
