= Frank Trimble O'Hair =

American politician

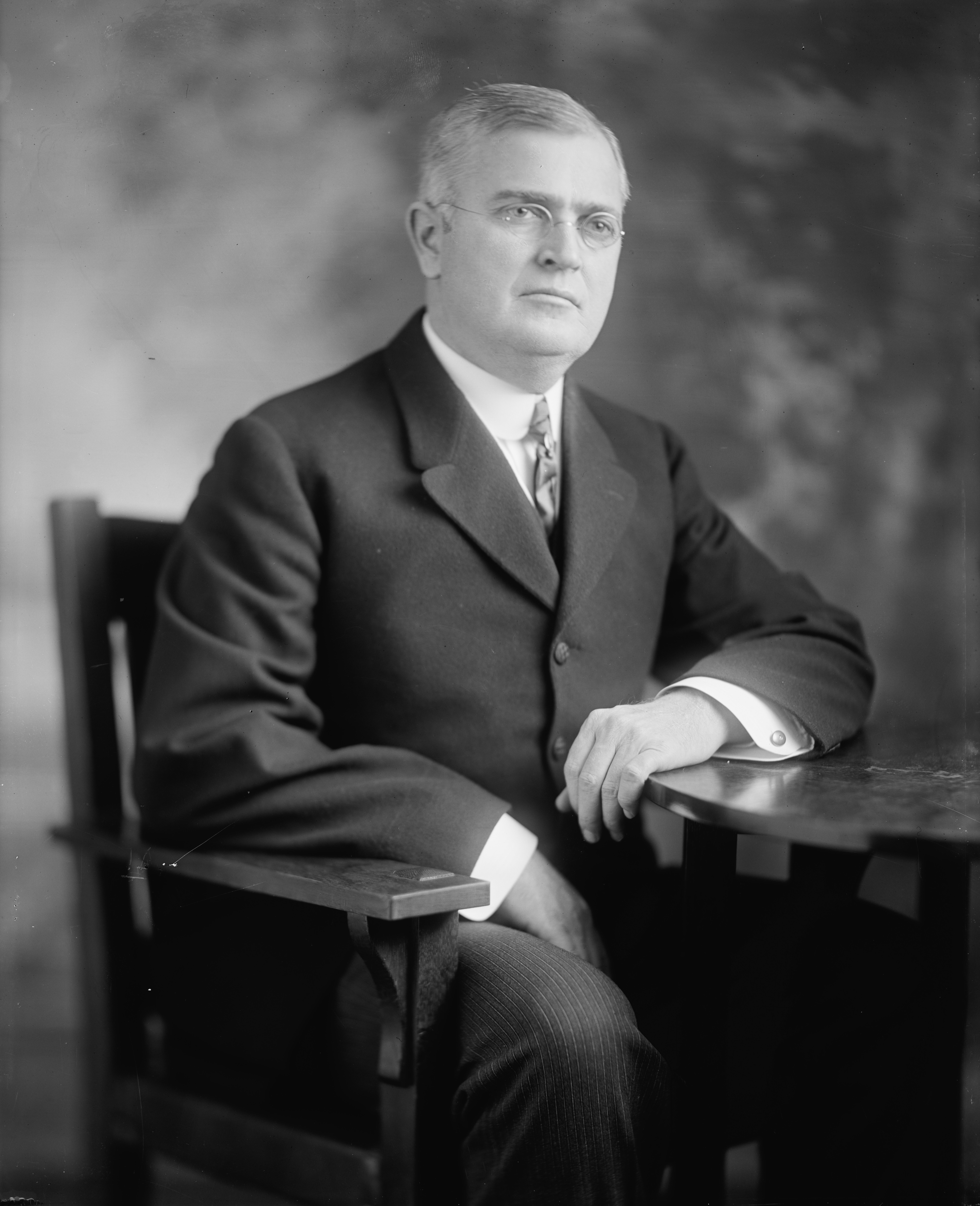

Member of the U.S. House of Representatives from Illinois's 18th district
- In office March 4, 1913 – March 3, 1915
- Preceded by: Joseph Gurney Cannon
- Succeeded by: Joseph Gurney Cannon

Personal details
- Born: March 12, 1870 Paris, Illinois
- Died: August 3, 1932 (aged 62) Paris, Illinois
- Party: Democratic

Frank Trimble O'Hair (March 12, 1870 – August 3, 1932) was a U.S. representative from Illinois.

== Biography ==
He was born near Paris, Illinois on March 12, 1870. O'Hair attended the common schools and was graduated from the law department of De Pauw University in Greencastle, Indiana, in 1893. He joined the Illinois State Bar Association the same year and commenced practice in Paris, Illinois. O'Hair was elected as a Democrat to the Sixty-third Congress from March 4, 1913, to March 3, 1915, defeating former Speaker of the House Joseph Gurney Cannon.

He was an unsuccessful candidate for reelection in 1914 to the Sixty-fourth Congress, losing to Cannon (who regained his seat). This repeated the pattern of fellow Democratic banker Samuel T. Busey who took Cannon's seat for one congressional interval 22 years earlier. Afterwards, he returned to banking. He resumed the practice of his profession in Paris, Illinois. In 1932 he was the Democratic nominee for Congress; he died in Paris on August 3, 1932. The replacement nominee was James A. Meeks, who went on to win the general election. O'Hair was interred at Edgar Cemetery in Paris.

U.S. House of Representatives
Preceded by Joseph Gurney Cannon	Member of the U.S. House of Representatives from Illinois's 18th congressional district March 4, 1913 – March 3, 1915	Succeeded by Joseph Gurney Cannon
