= James A. Meeks =

American politician

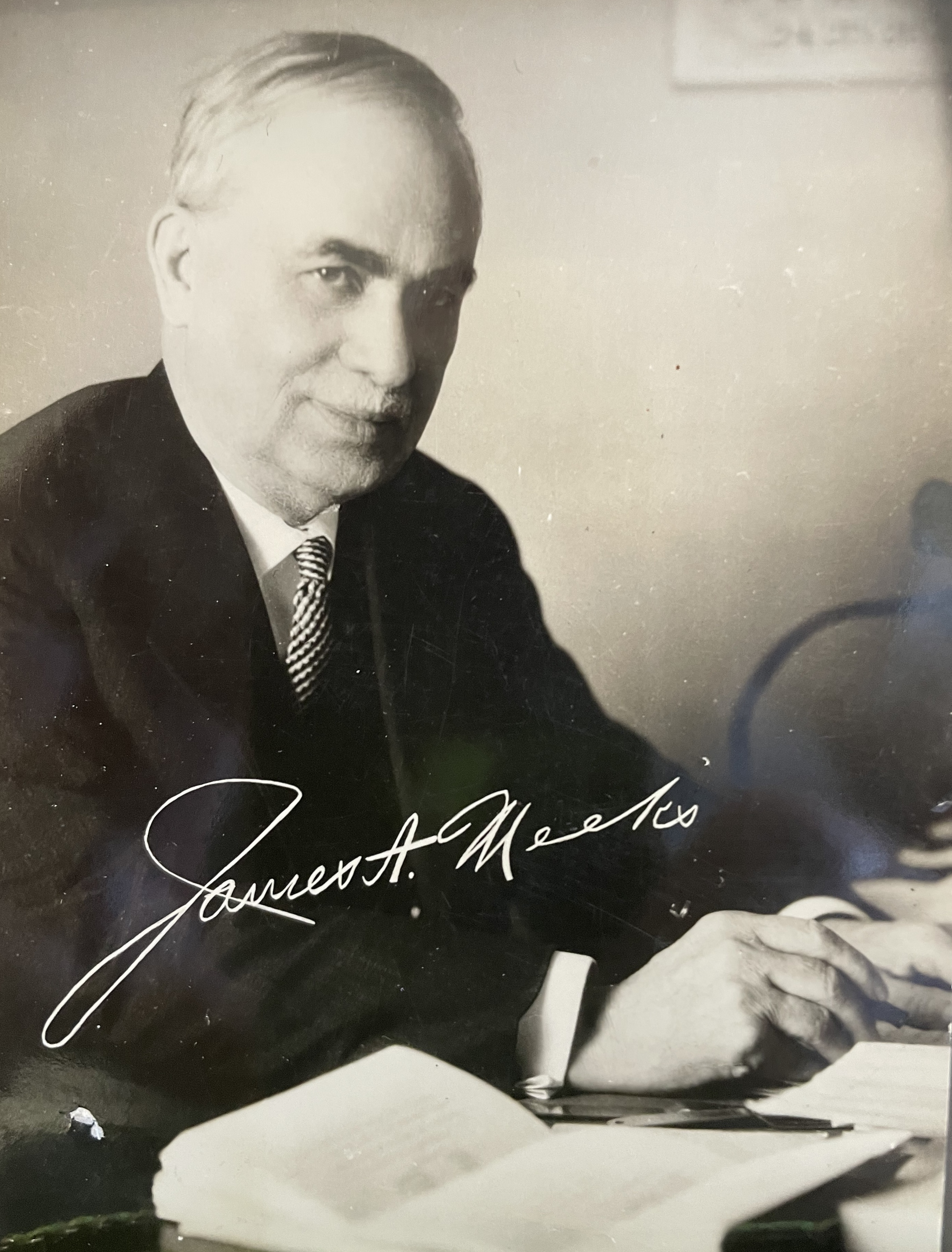
- 1938 campaign postcard distributed by Friends of Congressman Meeks (Danville, Illinois)

Member of the U.S. House of Representatives from Illinois's 18th district
- In office March 4, 1933 – January 3, 1939
- Preceded by: William P. Holaday
- Succeeded by: Jessie Sumner

Personal details
- Born: March 7, 1864 Matamoras, Ohio, U.S.
- Died: November 10, 1946 (aged 82) Danville, Illinois, U.S.
- Resting place: Spring Hill Cemetery, Danville, Illinois, U.S.
- Party: Democratic
- Spouse: Frances R. Pearson (m. 1898)
- Education: Westfield College; Illinois College
- Profession: Attorney

James Andrew Meeks (March 7, 1864 – November 10, 1946) was an American attorney and politician from Danville, Illinois. A Democrat, he served in local offices including Danville's corporation counsel. He served as a U.S. Representative from Illinois from 1933 to 1939.

== Early life ==
James A. Meeks was born in New Matamoras, Ohio on March 7, 1864, the son of Moses Meeks and Susan (Hackathorn) Meeks. In 1865, his family relocated to Danville, Illinois, where he was raised and educated. He attended Westfield College and Illinois College. He then studied law with Judge E. R. E. Kimbrough, attained admission to the bar in 1890, and commenced practice in Danville as Kimbrough's partner. Meeks later practiced in partnership with George F. Rearick, and their general civil practice firm was counsel for several corporations, railroads, and banks, including the First National Bank of Danville, First National Bank of Sidell, Citizens National Bank of Ridge Farm, and Farmers State Bank of Armstrong. Later partnerships included Meeks & Lowenstein and Meeks & Wise.

Meeks served as master in chancery of the circuit court from 1903 to 1915. During World War I, he was the Vermillion County chairman of the state council of defense. Meeks was active in politics as a Democrat, and frequently campaigned on behalf of the party's local and statewide candidates. He was a candidate for governor of Illinois in the 1924 election. When Norman L. Jones won the Democratic nomination, Meeks supported Jones. Meeks was subsequently mentioned that year as a candidate for an at-large seat in the U.S. House but did not run. He was also mentioned in connection with the 1924 nomination for Illinois Secretary of State, but the nomination went to Andrew Olson. In 1925, Meeks received the honorary degree of Master of Arts from Jacksonville College.

== Later career ==
From 1925 to 1931, Meeks served as Danville's corporation counsel. He was a delegate to the Democratic National Conventions in 1920, 1924, 1928, and 1932. At the 1924 convention, Meeks made a seconding speech for the nomination of presidential candidate William Gibbs McAdoo.

In 1932, Meeks was selected as the Democratic nominee in Illinois's 18th congressional district after the death of the original nominee, Frank Trimble O'Hair. Meeks won the election and was reelected in 1934 and 1936. He served from March 4, 1933 to January 3, 1939, the 73rd, 74th, and 75th Congresses. During his House tenure, Meeks served on the Banking and Currency Committee. He was an unsuccessful candidate for reelection in 1938 to the 76th Congress.

After leaving Congress, Meeks resumed the practice of law and also engaged in banking. In 1940, he was an unsuccessful candidate for election to the 77th Congress. Meeks was active in the Knights of Pythias and Elks, and was a member of the Vermillion County, Illinois, and American Bar Associations. In addition, he was a trustee of Illinois College, and was active in the Sigma Pi literary society. He died in Danville on November 10, 1946. Meeks was interred at Spring Hill Cemetery in Danville.

Meeks's wife died in 1962, and her estate later endowed a scholarship fund at Illinois College. The James A. Meeks Memorial Scholarship is awarded to outstanding juniors for academic excellence in History, Political Science, Philosophy and Religion.

U.S. House of Representatives
Preceded by William P. Holaday	Member of the U.S. House of Representatives from Illinois's 18th congressional district 1933-1939	Succeeded by Jessie Sumner
