= Mantrap Township, Hubbard County, Minnesota =

Mantrap Township, Minnesota
- Township
- Location of Mantrap Township, within Hubbard County, Minnesota
- Coordinates: 47°0′59″N 94°51′21″W
- Country: United States
- State: Minnesota
- County: Hubbard

Area
  - Total: 35.8 sq mi (92.8 km^{2})
  - Land: 30.8 sq mi (79.9 km^{2})
  - Water: 5.0 sq mi (12.9 km^{2})
- Elevation: 1,440 ft (439 m)

Population (2020)
  - Total: 522
  - Density: 16.9/sq mi (6.53/km^{2})
- Time zone: UTC-6 (Central (CST))
  - Summer (DST): UTC-5 (CDT)
- ZIP code: 56467
- Area code: 218
- FIPS code: 27-40022
- GNIS feature ID: 0664896
- Website: https://mantraptownshipmn.gov/

Mantrap Township is a township in Hubbard County, Minnesota, United States. The population was 522 at the 2020 census.

Mantrap Township took its name from Mantrap Lake.

== Geography ==
According to the United States Census Bureau, the township has a total area of 35.8 square miles (92.8 km^{2}), of which 30.8 square miles (79.8 km^{2}) is land and 5.0 square miles (12.9 km^{2}) (13.93%) is water.

== Demographics ==
As of the census of 2000, there were 454 people, 196 households, and 148 families residing in the township. The population density was 14.7 inhabitants per square mile (5.7/km^{2}). There were 451 housing units at an average density of 14.6 per square mile (5.6/km^{2}). The racial makeup of the township was 97.80% White, 1.10% Native American, 0.44% Asian, 0.22% from other races, and 0.44% from two or more races. Hispanic or Latino of any race were 0.22% of the population.

There were 196 households, out of which 23.0% had children under the age of 18 living with them, 66.8% were married couples living together, 7.1% had a female householder with no husband present, and 24.0% were non-families. 19.9% of all households were made up of individuals, and 9.2% had someone living alone who was 65 years of age or older. The average household size was 2.32 and the average family size was 2.62.

In the township the population was spread out, with 18.9% under the age of 18, 3.7% from 18 to 24, 20.9% from 25 to 44, 37.4% from 45 to 64, and 18.9% who were 65 years of age or older. The median age was 49 years. For every 100 females, there were 113.1 males. For every 100 females age 18 and over, there were 112.7 males.

The median income for a household in the township was $39,583, and the median income for a family was $45,000. Males had a median income of $27,125 versus $27,917 for females. The per capita income for the township was $22,730. About 7.5% of families and 10.3% of the population were below the poverty line, including 14.3% of those under age 18 and 11.8% of those age 65 or over.
