= Mantrap Lake =

Lake in the state of Minnesota, United States

- Location within Minnesota
- Location: Hubbard County, Minnesota
- Coordinates: 47°4′18″N 94°54′48″W
- Type: lake

Mantrap Lake is a lake in Hubbard County, in the U.S. state of Minnesota.

Mantrap Lake was so named because it was known by the pioneers to be difficult to travel around it.

== See also ==
- List of lakes in Minnesota
