= 1952 United States House of Representatives elections =

House elections for the 83rd U.S. Congress

- November 4, 1952 (Note: September 8, 1952, in Maine)

All 435 seats in the United States House of Representatives 218 seats needed for a majority
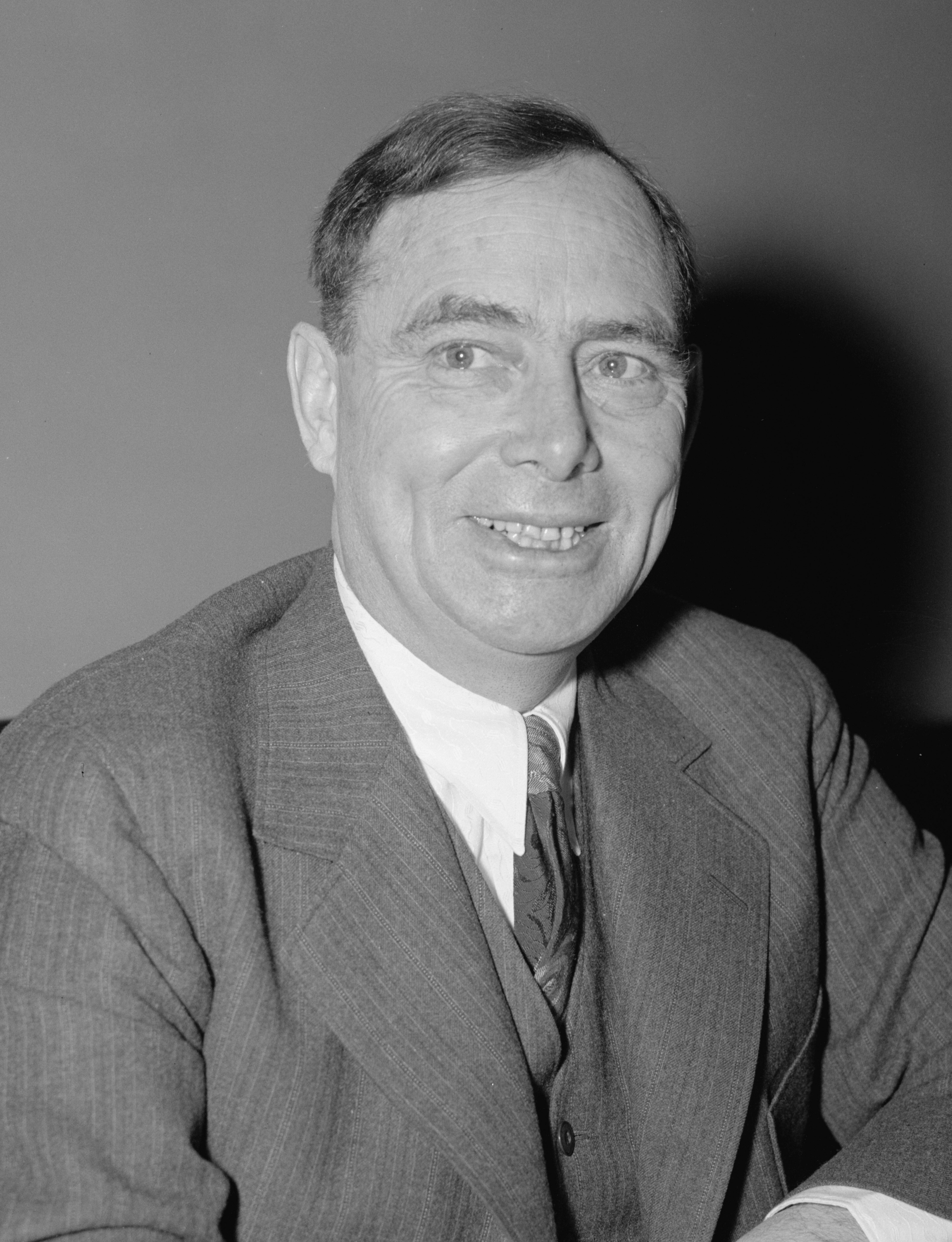

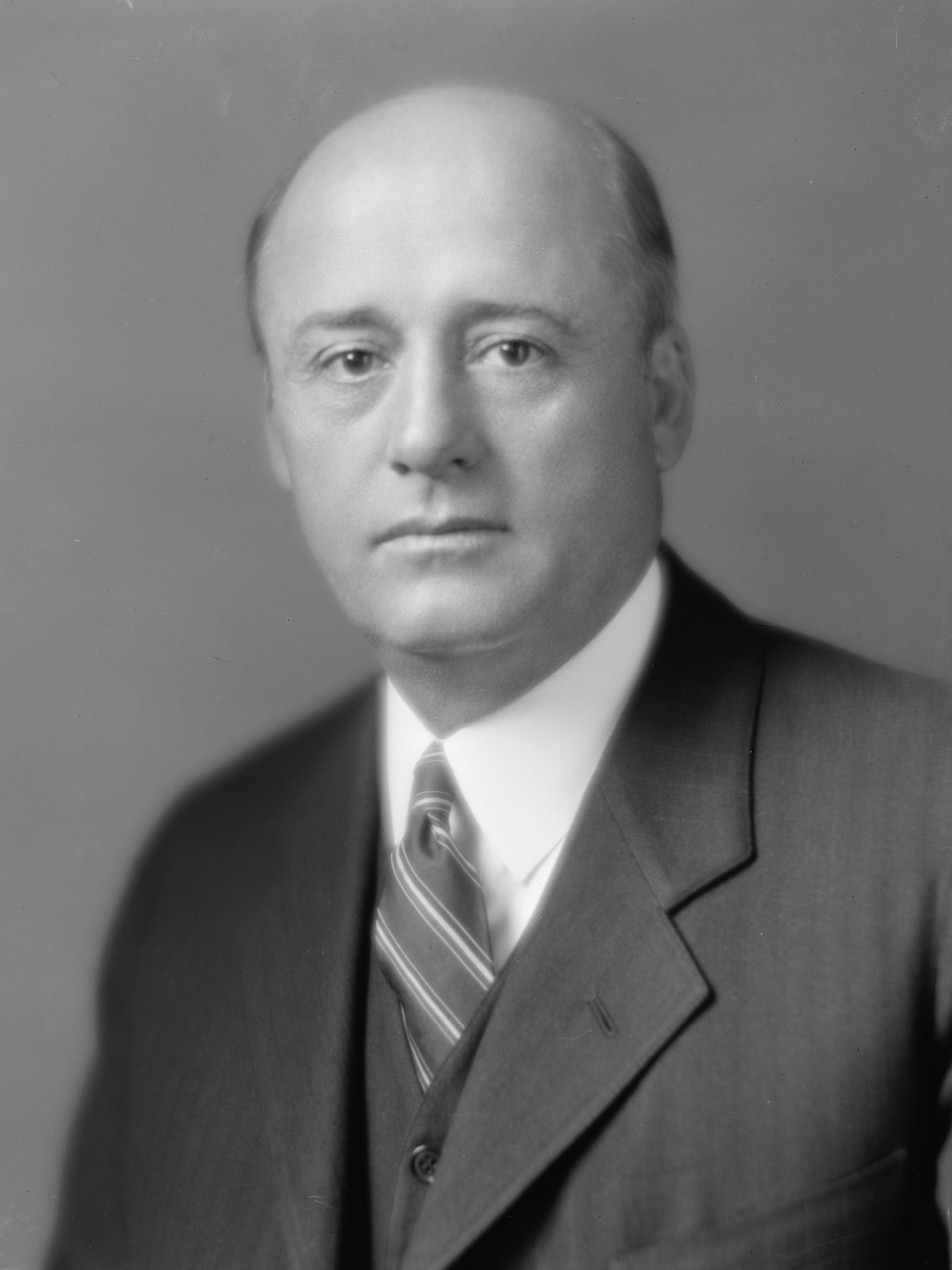
	Majority party	Minority party
Leader	Joseph Martin	Sam Rayburn
Party	Republican	Democratic
Leader since	January 3, 1939	September 16, 1940
Leader's seat	Massachusetts 14th	Texas 4th
Last election	199 seats	235 seats
Seats won	221	213
Seat change	▲22	▼22
Popular vote	28,393,794	28,642,537
Percentage	49.3%	49.8%
Swing	▲0.4pp	▲0.2pp
	Third party
Party	Independent
Last election	1 seat
Seats won	1
Seat change	Steady
Popular vote	111,780
Percentage	0.2%
Swing	▼0.1pp
- Results: Democratic hold Democratic gain Republican hold Republican gain Independent hold
Speaker before election
Sam Rayburn
Democratic
Elected Speaker
Joseph Martin
Republican

The 1952 United States House of Representatives elections was an election for the United States House of Representatives to elect members to serve in the 83rd United States Congress. They were held for the most part on November 4, 1952, while Maine held theirs on September 8. This was the first election after the congressional reapportionment based on the 1950 census. It also coincided with the election of President Dwight Eisenhower. Eisenhower's Republican Party gained 22 seats from the Democratic Party, gaining a majority of the House.

Despite the Republican victory, the Democrats won the popular vote by almost 250,000 votes (0.4%) due to their overwhelming margins in the Solid South. As a result, this marked one of only two times in the 20th century in which the Republicans won a House majority without winning the popular vote, with the other time being in 1996; it was also one of four times where either party did so in the 20th century, with the other three instances occurring in 1914, 1942, and 1996. However, of these four, this election was the only one, and the only such election in US House history as of 2026, where the party that won the popular vote but not the House majority also suffered a net loss in seats.

Though the Democrats continued their winning streak in the Solid South, this election did see the first Republican elected to the House from North Carolina since 1928, and the first Republicans elected from Virginia since 1930. As of 2026, this is the last election in which both major parties increased their share of the popular vote simultaneously, largely due to the disintegration of the American Labor Party and other third parties.

The dismal approval rating of the outgoing president Harry Truman was one reason why his party lost its House majority. Also, continued uneasiness about the Korean War was an important factor. Joseph Martin (R-Massachusetts) became Speaker of the House, exchanging places with Sam Rayburn (D-Texas), who became the new Minority Leader.

This was the last time Republicans won control of the House of Representatives until 1994, despite the GOP controlling the presidency for the majority of the next four decades. Democrats outperformed in downballot elections, especially in the South, which had started to drift towards Republican presidential candidates. As of 2026, this is the last time the House changed partisan control during a presidential election, and the last time both houses did so simultaneously.

== Overall results ==
↓
221	1	213
Republican	I	Democratic

Party	Total seats	Seat change	Seat percentage	Vote percentage	Popular vote
Democratic Party	213	▼22	49.0%	49.8%	28,642,537
Republican Party	221	▲22	50.8%	49.3%	28,393,794
Progressive Party	0	Steady	0.0%	0.3%	145,171
Liberal Party	0	Steady	0.0%	0.2%	113,631
Independents	1	Steady	0.2%	0.2%	111,780
American Labor Party	0	Steady	0.0%	0.2%	95,597
Prohibition Party	0	Steady	0.0%	0.1%	38,664
People's Choice Party	0	Steady	0.0%	<0.1%	8,853
Socialist Party	0	Steady	0.0%	<0.1%	4,892
Increase Jobless Pay Party	0	Steady	0.0%	<0.1%	3,432
People's Rights Party	0	Steady	0.0%	<0.1%	2,434
Socialist Workers Party	0	Steady	0.0%	<0.1%	1,750
Square Deal Party	0	Steady	0.0%	<0.1%	548
Independent Citizens Committee	0	Steady	0.0%	<0.1%	247
Socialist Labor Party	0	Steady	0.0%	<0.1%	177
Others	0	Steady	0.0%	<0.1%	7,233
Totals	435	Steady	100.0%	100.0%	57,570,740
Source: Election Statistics - Office of the Clerk

Popular vote
Democratic	49.75%
Republican	49.32%
Others	0.93%

House seats
Republican	50.80%
Democratic	48.97%
Others	0.23%

Results shaded by winners share of vote

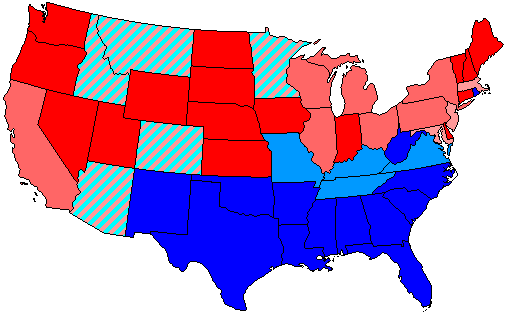
House seats by party holding majority in state: up to 100% Republican / up to 100% Democratic; up to 80% Republican / up to 80% Democratic; up to 60% Republican / up to 60% Democratic

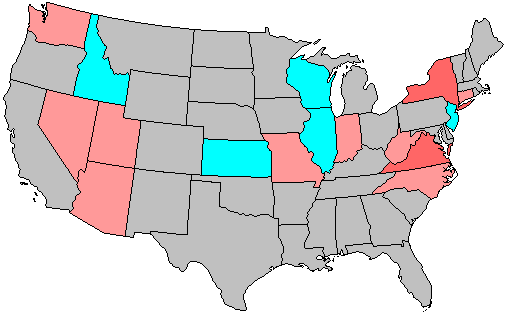
Change in seats: 6+ Republican gain / 6+ Democratic gain; 3–5 Republican gain / 3–5 Democratic gain; 1–2 Republican gain / 1–2 Democratic gain; no net change

== Special elections ==
Four special elections were held to finish terms in the 82nd United States Congress, which would end January 3, 1953.

District	Incumbent			This race	
District	Representative	Party	First elected	Results	Candidates
New York 5	T. Vincent Quinn	Democratic	1948	Incumbent resigned December 30, 1951. New member elected February 19, 1952. Republican gain. Winner lost re-election in November.	▌ ✓ Robert T. Ross (Republican) 53.1%; ▌Hugh Quinn (Democratic) 35.1%; ▌George F. Cranmore (Liberal) 8.1%; ▌Thelma Bearman (American Labor) 3.7%
New York 32	William T. Byrne	Democratic	1944	Incumbent died January 27, 1952. New member elected April 1, 1952. Democratic hold. Winner won re-election in November.	▌ ✓ Leo W. O'Brien (Democratic) 70.8%; ▌John F. Former Jr. (Republican) 28.9%; ▌Scott K. Gray Jr. (American Labor) 0.3%
Kentucky 2	John A. Whitaker	Democratic	1948 (special)	Incumbent died December 15, 1951. New member elected August 2, 1952. Democratic hold. Winner won re-election in November.	▌ ✓ Garrett Withers (Democratic); Uncontested
Texas 7	Tom Pickett	Democratic	1944	Incumbent resigned June 30, 1952. New member elected September 23, 1952. Democratic hold. Winner won re-election in November.	▌ ✓ John Dowdy (Democratic) 88.5%; ▌Jack Weisner (Democratic) 7.0%; ▌Jim Norton (Democratic) 4.5%

== Alabama ==
District	Incumbent	Party	First elected	Result	Candidates
Alabama 1	Frank W. Boykin	Democratic	1935 (special)	Incumbent re-elected.	▌ ✓ Frank W. Boykin (Democratic); Uncontested
Alabama 2	George M. Grant	Democratic	1938	Incumbent re-elected.	▌ ✓ George M. Grant (Democratic); Uncontested
Alabama 3	George W. Andrews	Democratic	1944	Incumbent re-elected.	▌ ✓ George W. Andrews (Democratic); Uncontested
Alabama 4	Kenneth A. Roberts	Democratic	1950	Incumbent re-elected.	▌ ✓ Kenneth A. Roberts (Democratic); Uncontested
Alabama 5	Albert Rains	Democratic	1944	Incumbent re-elected.	▌ ✓ Albert Rains (Democratic); Uncontested
Alabama 6	Edward deGraffenried	Democratic	1948	Incumbent lost renomination. Democratic hold.	▌ ✓ Armistead Selden (Democratic); Uncontested
Alabama 7	Carl Elliott	Democratic	1948	Incumbent re-elected.	▌ ✓ Carl Elliott (Democratic) 72.5%; ▌Cyrus Kitchens (Republican) 27.5%
Alabama 8	Robert E. Jones Jr.	Democratic	1947 (special)	Incumbent re-elected.	▌ ✓ Robert E. Jones Jr. (Democratic) 87.3%; ▌H. G. Williams (Republican) 12.7%
Alabama 9	Laurie C. Battle	Democratic	1946	Incumbent re-elected.	▌ ✓ Laurie C. Battle (Democratic); Uncontested

== Arizona ==
District	Incumbent	Party	First elected	Result	Candidates
Arizona 1	John R. Murdock	Democratic	1936	Incumbent lost re-election. Republican gain.	▌ ✓ John Jacob Rhodes (Republican) 54.0%; ▌John R. Murdock (Democratic) 46.0%
Arizona 2	Harold Patten	Democratic	1948	Incumbent re-elected.	▌ ✓ Harold Patten (Democratic) 56.9%; ▌William C. Frey (Republican) 43.1%

== Arkansas ==
Arkansas lost one seat in reapportionment leaving it with 6; the existing 4th district along the western edge of the state lost some of its territory to the 3rd district in the northwest, and the rest was merged with the 7th district in the south, with minor changes to other districts.

District	Incumbent	Party	First elected	Result	Candidates
Arkansas 1	Ezekiel C. Gathings	Democratic	1938	Incumbent re-elected.	▌ ✓ Ezekiel C. Gathings (Democratic); Uncontested
Arkansas 2	Wilbur Mills	Democratic	1938	Incumbent re-elected.	▌ ✓ Wilbur Mills (Democratic); Uncontested
Arkansas 3	James William Trimble	Democratic	1944	Incumbent re-elected.	▌ ✓ James William Trimble (Democratic) 56.0%; ▌Jack Joyce (Republican) 44.0%
Arkansas 4	Boyd Anderson Tackett	Democratic	1948	Incumbent retired to run for Governor of Arkansas. Democratic loss.	▌ ✓ Oren Harris (Democratic); Uncontested
Arkansas 4	Oren Harris; Redistricted from the 7th district	Democratic	1940	Incumbent re-elected.	▌ ✓ Oren Harris (Democratic); Uncontested
Arkansas 5	Brooks Hays	Democratic	1942	Incumbent re-elected.	▌ ✓ Brooks Hays (Democratic) 78.8%; ▌Alonzo A. Ross (Republican) 19.5%; ▌Ed Schultz (Independent) 1.8%
Arkansas 6	William F. Norrell	Democratic	1938	Incumbent re-elected.	▌ ✓ William F. Norrell (Democratic); Uncontested

== California ==
Seven new seats were added in reapportionment, increasing the delegation from 23 to 30 seats. Two of the new seats were won by Democrats, and five by Republicans. One Republican and one Democratic incumbents lost re-election, and a retiring Democrat was replaced by a Republican. Overall, therefore, Democrats gained one seat and Republicans gained 7.

District	Incumbent	Party	First elected	Result	Candidates
California 1	Hubert B. Scudder	Republican	1948	Incumbent re-elected.	▌ ✓ Hubert B. Scudder (Republican) 86.4%; ▌Carl Sullivan (Ind. Progressive) 13.6%
California 2	Clair Engle	Democratic	1943 (special)	Incumbent re-elected.	▌ ✓ Clair Engle (Democratic); Uncontested
California 3	None (new district)			New seat. Democratic gain.	▌ ✓ John E. Moss (Democratic) 50.8%; ▌Leslie E. Wood (Republican) 47.8%; ▌Helen C. Thomsen (Ind. Progressive) 1.4%
California 4	Franck R. Havenner	Democratic	1936/1944	Incumbent lost re-election. Republican gain.	▌ ✓ William S. Mailliard (Republican) 55.0%; ▌Franck R. Havenner (Democratic) 45.0%
California 5	John F. Shelley	Democratic	1949 (special)	Incumbent re-elected.	▌ ✓ John F. Shelley (Democratic); Uncontested
California 6	None (new district)			New seat. Democratic gain.	▌ ✓ Robert Condon (Democratic) 50.6%; ▌John F. Baldwin Jr. (Republican) 49.4%
California 7	John J. Allen Jr.	Republican	1946	Incumbent re-elected.	▌ ✓ John J. Allen Jr. (Republican) 84.3%; ▌John Allen Johnson (Ind. Progressive) 15.7%
California 8	George P. Miller; Redistricted from the 6th district	Democratic	1944	Incumbent re-elected.	▌ ✓ George P. Miller (Democratic); Uncontested
California 9	None (new district)			New seat. Republican gain.	▌ ✓ J. Arthur Younger (Republican) 53.1%; ▌Harold F. Taggart (Democratic) 45.3%; ▌Charles S. Brown (Ind. Progressive) 1.6%
California 10	Jack Z. Anderson; Redistricted from the 8th district	Republican	1938	Incumbent retired. Republican hold.	▌ ✓ Charles Gubser (Republican) 59.2%; ▌Arthur L. Johnson (Democratic) 39.1%; ▌Betsey K. Fisher (Ind. Progressive) 1.6%
California 11	J. Leroy Johnson; Redistricted from the 3rd district	Republican	1942	Incumbent re-elected.	▌ ✓ J. Leroy Johnson (Republican) 87.1%; ▌Leslie B. Schlingheyde (Democratic) 12.9%
California 12	Allan O. Hunter; Redistricted from the 9th district	Republican	1950	Incumbent re-elected.	▌ ✓ Allan O. Hunter (Republican); Uncontested
California 13	Ernest K. Bramblett; Redistricted from the 11th district	Republican	1946	Incumbent re-elected.	▌ ✓ Ernest K. Bramblett (Republican) 51.0%; ▌Will Hays (Democratic) 49.0%
California 14	Thomas H. Werdel; Redistricted from the 10th district	Republican	1948	Incumbent lost re-election. Democratic gain.	▌ ✓ Harlan Hagen (Democratic) 51.0%; ▌Thomas H. Werdel (Republican) 49.0%
California 15	Gordon L. McDonough	Republican	1944	Incumbent re-elected.	▌ ✓ Gordon L. McDonough (Republican); Uncontested
California 16	Donald L. Jackson	Republican	1946	Incumbent re-elected.	▌ ✓ Donald L. Jackson (Republican) 59.7%; ▌Jerry K. Harter (Democratic) 40.3%
California 17	Cecil R. King	Democratic	1942	Incumbent re-elected.	▌ ✓ Cecil R. King (Democratic) 54.6%; ▌Robert H. Finch (Republican) 44.1%; ▌Loyd C. Seeliger (Ind. Progressive) 1.3%
California 18	None (new district)			New seat. Republican gain.	▌ ✓ Craig Hosmer (Republican) 55.5%; ▌Joseph M. Kennick (Democratic) 44.5%
California 19	Chet Holifield	Democratic	1942	Incumbent re-elected.	▌ ✓ Chet Holifield (Democratic) 87.1%; ▌Ida Alvarez (Ind. Progressive) 9.4%; ▌Milton Snipper (Independent) 3.4%
California 20	John Carl Hinshaw	Republican	1938	Incumbent re-elected.	▌ ✓ John Carl Hinshaw (Republican); Uncontested
California 21	None (new district)			New seat. Republican gain.	▌ ✓ Edgar W. Hiestand (Republican) 53.6%; ▌Everett G. Burkhalter (Democratic) 46.4%
California 22	None (new district)			New seat. Republican gain.	▌ ✓ Joseph F. Holt (Republican) 60.5%; ▌Dean McHenry (Democratic) 39.5%
California 23	Clyde Doyle; Redistricted from the 18th district	Democratic	1948	Incumbent re-elected.	▌ ✓ Clyde Doyle (Democratic) 87.5%; ▌Olive T. Thompson (Ind. Progressive) 11.1%; ▌C. Cleveland (Write-in) 1.5%
California 24	Norris Poulson; Redistricted from the 13th district	Republican	1932/1946	Incumbent re-elected.	▌ ✓ Norris Poulson (Republican) 87.4%; ▌Bertram L. Sharp (Ind. Progressive) 12.6%
California 25	Patrick J. Hillings; Redistricted from the 12th district	Republican	1950	Incumbent re-elected.	▌ ✓ Patrick J. Hillings (Republican) 64.3%; ▌Woodrow Wilson Sayre (Democratic) 35.7%
California 26	Sam Yorty; Redistricted from the 14th district	Democratic	1950	Incumbent re-elected.	▌ ✓ Sam Yorty (Democratic) 88.0%; ▌Horace V. Alexander (Ind. Progressive) 12.0%
California 27	Harry R. Sheppard; Redistricted from the 21st district	Democratic	1936	Incumbent re-elected.	▌ ✓ Harry R. Sheppard (Democratic) 55.0%; ▌Carl B. Hilliard (Republican) 45.0%
California 28	None (new district)			New seat. Republican gain.	▌ ✓ James B. Utt (Republican) 63.0%; ▌Lionel Van Deerlin (Democratic) 37.0%
California 29	John Phillips; Redistricted from the 22nd district	Republican	1942	Incumbent re-elected.	▌ ✓ John Phillips (Republican); Uncontested
California 30	Clinton D. McKinnon; Redistricted from the 23rd district	Democratic	1948	Incumbent retired to run for U.S. senator. Republican gain.	▌ ✓ Bob Wilson (Republican) 59.6%; ▌De Graff Austin (Democratic) 40.4%

== Colorado ==
District	Incumbent	Party	First elected	Result	Candidates
Colorado 1	Byron G. Rogers	Democratic	1950	Incumbent re-elected.	▌ ✓ Byron G. Rogers (Democratic) 50.8%; ▌Mason K. Knuckles (Republican) 48.6%; ▌Carle Whitehead (Socialist) 0.7%
Colorado 2	William S. Hill	Republican	1940	Incumbent re-elected.	▌ ✓ William S. Hill (Republican) 63.1%; ▌Ralph L. Williams (Democratic) 36.9%
Colorado 3	John Chenoweth	Republican	1950	Incumbent re-elected.	▌ ✓ John Chenoweth (Republican) 57.7%; ▌John H. Marsalis (Democratic) 42.3%
Colorado 4	Wayne N. Aspinall	Democratic	1948	Incumbent re-elected.	▌ ✓ Wayne N. Aspinall (Democratic) 50.0%; ▌Howard M. Shults (Republican) 50.0%

== Connecticut ==
District	Incumbent	Party	First elected	Result	Candidates
Connecticut 1	Abraham Ribicoff	Democratic	1948	Incumbent retired to run for U.S. senator. Democratic hold.	▌ ✓ Thomas J. Dodd (Democratic) 54.0%; ▌John Ashmead (Republican) 46.0%
Connecticut 2	Horace Seely-Brown Jr.	Republican	1950	Incumbent re-elected.	▌ ✓ Horace Seely-Brown Jr. (Republican) 55.5%; ▌William M. Citron (Democratic) 44.5%
Connecticut 3	John A. McGuire	Democratic	1948	Incumbent lost re-election. Republican gain.	▌ ✓ Albert W. Cretella (Republican) 52.8%; ▌John A. McGuire (Democratic) 47.2%
Connecticut 4	Albert P. Morano	Republican	1950	Incumbent re-elected.	▌ ✓ Albert P. Morano (Republican) 60.1%; ▌Joseph P. Lyford (Democratic) 39.3%; ▌Stanley Mayhew (Socialist) 0.6%
Connecticut 5	James T. Patterson	Republican	1946	Incumbent re-elected.	▌ ✓ James T. Patterson (Republican) 56.7%; ▌John A. Speziale (Democratic) 43.3%
Connecticut at-large	Antoni Sadlak	Republican	1946	Incumbent re-elected.	▌ ✓ Antoni Sadlak (Republican) 55.0%; ▌Stanley J. Pribyson (Democratic) 44.8%; ▌Annie B. Waterman (Socialist) 0.3%

== Delaware ==
District	Incumbent	Party	First elected	Result	Candidates
Delaware at-large	J. Caleb Boggs	Republican	1946	Incumbent retired to run for Governor of Delaware. Republican hold.	▌ ✓ Herbert Warburton (Republican) 51.9%; ▌Joseph S. Scannell (Democratic) 48.1%

== Florida ==
Florida was redistricted from 6 districts to 8, splitting the area around Sarasota out from the Tampa-St. Petersburg based 1st district, and splitting Gainesville out from the Jacksonville-based 2nd district.

District	Incumbent	Party	First elected	Result	Candidates
Florida 1	Chester B. McMullen	Democratic	1950	Incumbent retired. Democratic hold.	▌ ✓ Courtney W. Campbell (Democratic) 50.7%; ▌William C. Cramer (Republican) 49.3%
Florida 2	Charles E. Bennett	Democratic	1948	Incumbent re-elected.	▌ ✓ Charles E. Bennett (Democratic); Uncontested
Florida 3	Bob Sikes	Democratic	1940; 1944 (resigned); 1974	Incumbent re-elected.	▌ ✓ Bob Sikes (Democratic); Uncontested
Florida 4	Bill Lantaff	Democratic	1950	Incumbent re-elected.	▌ ✓ Bill Lantaff (Democratic) 66.0%; ▌Dorothea Vermorel (Republican) 34.0%
Florida 5	Syd Herlong	Democratic	1948	Incumbent re-elected.	▌ ✓ Syd Herlong (Democratic); Uncontested
Florida 6	Dwight L. Rogers	Democratic	1944	Incumbent re-elected.	▌ ✓ Dwight L. Rogers (Democratic) 60.8%; ▌Janet H. Fitzgerald (Republican) 39.2%
Florida 7	None (new district)			New seat. Democratic gain.	▌ ✓ James A. Haley (Democratic) 56.3%; ▌Kent McKinley (Republican) 43.7%
Florida 8	None (new district)			New seat. Democratic gain.	▌ ✓ Donald Ray Matthews (Democratic); Uncontested

== Georgia ==
District	Incumbent	Party	First elected	Result	Candidates
Georgia 1	Prince Preston	Democratic	1946	Incumbent re-elected.	▌ ✓ Prince Preston (Democratic); Uncontested
Georgia 2	E. Eugene Cox	Democratic	1924	Incumbent re-elected.	▌ ✓ E. Eugene Cox (Democratic); Uncontested
Georgia 3	Tic Forrester	Democratic	1950	Incumbent re-elected.	▌ ✓ Tic Forrester (Democratic); Uncontested
Georgia 4	Albert Sidney Camp	Democratic	1939	Incumbent re-elected.	▌ ✓ Albert Sidney Camp (Democratic) 100.0%; ▌Enoch Calloway (Write-in) 0.02%
Georgia 5	James C. Davis	Democratic	1946	Incumbent re-elected.	▌ ✓ James C. Davis (Democratic) 100.0%; ▌Baxter Jones (Write-in) 0.02%
Georgia 6	Carl Vinson	Democratic	1914	Incumbent re-elected.	▌ ✓ Carl Vinson (Democratic); Uncontested
Georgia 7	Henderson Lovelace Lanham	Democratic	1946	Incumbent re-elected.	▌ ✓ Henderson Lovelace Lanham (Democratic) 99.9%; ▌Frank Gleason (Write-in) 0.1%
Georgia 8	William M. Wheeler	Democratic	1946	Incumbent re-elected.	▌ ✓ William M. Wheeler (Democratic) 99.9%; ▌J. M. Kent (Write-in) 0.1%
Georgia 9	John Stephens Wood	Democratic	1944	Incumbent retired. Democratic hold.	▌ ✓ Phil Landrum (Democratic); Uncontested
Georgia 10	Paul Brown	Democratic	1933	Incumbent re-elected.	▌ ✓ Paul Brown (Democratic); Uncontested

== Idaho ==
District	Incumbent	Party	First elected	Result	Candidates
Idaho 1	John Travers Wood	Republican	1950	Incumbent lost re-election. Democratic gain.	▌ ✓ Gracie Pfost (Democratic) 50.3%; ▌John Travers Wood (Republican) 49.7%
Idaho 2	Hamer H. Budge	Republican	1950	Incumbent re-elected.	▌ ✓ Hamer H. Budge (Republican) 66.2%; ▌W. H. Jensen (Democratic) 33.8%

== Illinois ==
Illinois lost one seat, redistricting from 26 to 25 districts. No changes were made to the Chicago area districts, but the downstate districts were broadly reorganized, forcing incumbents Peter F. Mack Jr. (Democratic) and Edward H. Jenison (Republican) into the same district.

District	Incumbent	Party	First elected	Result	Candidates
Illinois 1	William L. Dawson	Democratic	1942	Incumbent re-elected.	▌ ✓ William L. Dawson (Democratic) 73.5%; ▌Edgar G. Brown (Republican) 26.5%
Illinois 2	Richard B. Vail	Republican	1950	Incumbent lost re-election. Democratic gain.	▌ ✓ Barratt O'Hara (Democratic) 51.4%; ▌Richard B. Vail (Republican) 48.6%
Illinois 3	Fred E. Busbey	Republican	1950	Incumbent re-elected.	▌ ✓ Fred E. Busbey (Republican) 54.5%; ▌Neil J. Linehan (Democratic) 45.5%
Illinois 4	William E. McVey	Republican	1950	Incumbent re-elected.	▌ ✓ William E. McVey (Republican) 56.6%; ▌Arthur E. Dillner (Democratic) 43.4%
Illinois 5	John C. Kluczynski	Democratic	1950	Incumbent re-elected.	▌ ✓ John C. Kluczynski (Democratic) 64.5%; ▌Ernest L. Kaysen (Republican) 35.5%
Illinois 6	Thomas J. O'Brien	Democratic	1942	Incumbent re-elected.	▌ ✓ Thomas J. O'Brien (Democratic) 63.1%; ▌John L. Roach (Republican) 36.9%
Illinois 7	Adolph J. Sabath	Democratic	1906	Incumbent re-elected.	▌ ✓ Adolph J. Sabath (Democratic) 70.0%; ▌Louis F. Capuzi (Republican) 30.0%
Illinois 8	Thomas S. Gordon	Democratic	1942	Incumbent re-elected.	▌ ✓ Thomas S. Gordon (Democratic) 59.0%; ▌William F. Cooper (Republican) 41.0%
Illinois 9	Sidney R. Yates	Democratic	1948	Incumbent re-elected.	▌ ✓ Sidney R. Yates (Democratic) 52.4%; ▌Robert R. Siegrist (Republican) 47.6%
Illinois 10	Richard W. Hoffman	Republican	1948	Incumbent re-elected.	▌ ✓ Richard W. Hoffman (Republican) 65.0%; ▌John Schaffenegger (Democratic) 35.0%
Illinois 11	Timothy P. Sheehan	Republican	1950	Incumbent re-elected.	▌ ✓ Timothy P. Sheehan (Republican) 59.4%; ▌Stanley W. Morten (Democratic) 40.6%
Illinois 12	Edgar A. Jonas	Republican	1948	Incumbent re-elected.	▌ ✓ Edgar A. Jonas (Republican) 55.7%; ▌Philip A. Fleischman (Democratic) 44.3%
Illinois 13	Marguerite S. Church	Republican	1950	Incumbent re-elected.	▌ ✓ Marguerite S. Church (Republican) 70.6%; ▌Lawrence J. Hayes (Democratic) 29.4%
Illinois 14	Chauncey W. Reed	Republican	1934	Incumbent re-elected.	▌ ✓ Chauncey W. Reed (Republican) 71.5%; ▌William E. Hartnett (Democratic) 28.5%
Illinois 15	Noah M. Mason	Republican	1936	Incumbent re-elected.	▌ ✓ Noah M. Mason (Republican) 63.6%; ▌Stanley Hubbs (Democratic) 36.4%
Illinois 16	Leo E. Allen	Republican	1932	Incumbent re-elected.	▌ ✓ Leo E. Allen (Republican) 66.5%; ▌John P. Barton (Democratic) 33.5%
Illinois 17	Leslie C. Arends	Republican	1934	Incumbent re-elected.	▌ ✓ Leslie C. Arends (Republican) 63.6%; ▌John A. Kinneman (Democratic) 36.4%
Illinois 18	Harold H. Velde	Republican	1948	Incumbent re-elected.	▌ ✓ Harold H. Velde (Republican) 55.2%; ▌John T. McNaughton (Democratic) 44.8%
Illinois 19	Robert B. Chiperfield	Republican	1938	Incumbent re-elected.	▌ ✓ Robert B. Chiperfield (Republican) 60.8%; ▌Ray Simkins (Democratic) 39.2%
Illinois 20	Sid Simpson	Republican	1942	Incumbent re-elected.	▌ ✓ Sid Simpson (Republican) 61.8%; ▌John R. Roy (Democratic) 38.2%
Illinois 21	Peter F. Mack Jr.	Democratic	1948	Incumbent re-elected.	▌ ✓ Peter F. Mack Jr. (Democratic) 52.4%; ▌Edward H. Jenison (Republican) 47.6%
Illinois 21	Edward H. Jenison; Redistricted from the 23rd district	Republican	1946	Incumbent lost re-election. Republican loss.	▌ ✓ Peter F. Mack Jr. (Democratic) 52.4%; ▌Edward H. Jenison (Republican) 47.6%
Illinois 22	William L. Springer	Republican	1950	Incumbent re-elected.	▌ ✓ William L. Springer (Republican) 63.0%; ▌David W. Beggs Jr. (Democratic) 37.0%
Illinois 23	Charles W. Vursell; Redistricted from the 24th district	Republican	1942	Incumbent re-elected.	▌ ✓ Charles W. Vursell (Republican) 57.7%; ▌W. Carl Johnston (Democratic) 42.3%
Illinois 24	Melvin Price; Redistricted from the 25th district	Democratic	1944	Incumbent re-elected.	▌ ✓ Melvin Price (Democratic) 64.8%; ▌Phyllis Schlafly (Republican) 35.2%
Illinois 25	C. W. Bishop; Redistricted from the 26th district	Republican	1940	Incumbent re-elected.	▌ ✓ C. W. Bishop (Republican) 56.2%; ▌C. Edwin Hair (Democratic) 43.8%

== Indiana ==
District	Incumbent	Party	First elected	Result	Candidates
Indiana 1	Ray Madden	Democratic	1942	Incumbent re-elected.	▌ ✓ Ray Madden (Democratic) 56.4%; ▌Elliott Belshaw (Republican) 43.3%; ▌John P. Jones (Prohibition) 0.3%
Indiana 2	Charles A. Halleck	Republican	1935	Incumbent re-elected.	▌ ✓ Charles A. Halleck (Republican) 63.3%; ▌L. Dewey Burham (Democratic) 36.1%; ▌Ross J. McLennan (Prohibition) 0.6%
Indiana 3	Shepard Crumpacker	Republican	1950	Incumbent re-elected.	▌ ✓ Shepard Crumpacker (Republican) 54.5%; ▌Charles C. Price (Democratic) 44.9%; ▌Everett Mishler (Prohibition) 0.7%
Indiana 4	E. Ross Adair	Republican	1950	Incumbent re-elected.	▌ ✓ E. Ross Adair (Republican) 63.7%; ▌Howard L. Morrison (Democratic) 35.4%; ▌Claude Swartz (Prohibition) 0.9%
Indiana 5	John V. Beamer	Republican	1950	Incumbent re-elected.	▌ ✓ John V. Beamer (Republican) 56.9%; ▌Philip Chase Dermond (Democratic) 42.3%; ▌Ralph G. Stallsmith (Prohibition) 0.9%
Indiana 6	Cecil M. Harden	Republican	1948	Incumbent re-elected.	▌ ✓ Cecil M. Harden (Republican) 55.7%; ▌Jack H. Mankin (Democratic) 44.0%; ▌Woodrow Shields (Prohibition) 0.3%
Indiana 7	William G. Bray	Republican	1950	Incumbent re-elected.	▌ ✓ William G. Bray (Republican) 56.1%; ▌Thomas J. Courtney (Democratic) 43.4%; ▌Maurice G. Murphy (Prohibition) 0.5%
Indiana 8	Winfield K. Denton	Democratic	1948	Incumbent lost re-election. Republican gain.	▌ ✓ D. Bailey Merrill (Republican) 52.6%; ▌Winfield K. Denton (Democratic) 47.0%; ▌Raymond Morris (Prohibition) 0.5%
Indiana 9	Earl Wilson	Republican	1940	Incumbent re-elected.	▌ ✓ Earl Wilson (Republican) 56.4%; ▌Edward Lewis (Democratic) 43.2%; ▌Elmer D. Riggs (Prohibition) 0.5%
Indiana 10	Ralph Harvey	Republican	1947	Incumbent re-elected.	▌ ✓ Ralph Harvey (Republican) 59.9%; ▌Fred V. Culp (Democratic) 39.1%; ▌Lela Stubbefield (Prohibition) 1.0%
Indiana 11	Charles B. Brownson	Republican	1950	Incumbent re-elected.	▌ ✓ Charles B. Brownson (Republican) 59.3%; ▌John C. Carvey (Democratic) 40.3%; ▌Vernon Dunkel (Prohibition) 0.3%

== Iowa ==
District	Incumbent	Party	First elected	Result	Candidates
Iowa 1	Thomas E. Martin	Republican	1938	Incumbent re-elected.	▌ ✓ Thomas E. Martin (Republican) 62.8%; ▌Clair A. Williams (Democratic) 36.9%; ▌F. A. Oliver (Prohibition) 0.2%
Iowa 2	Henry O. Talle	Republican	1938	Incumbent re-elected.	▌ ✓ Henry O. Talle (Republican) 62.2%; ▌T. W. Mullaney (Democratic) 37.7%; ▌Roy Corliss (Democratic) 0.1%
Iowa 3	H. R. Gross	Republican	1948	Incumbent re-elected.	▌ ✓ H. R. Gross (Republican) 65.8%; ▌George R. Laub (Democratic) 34.0%; ▌Paul Kindschi (Prohibition) 0.1%
Iowa 4	Karl M. LeCompte	Republican	1938	Incumbent re-elected.	▌ ✓ Karl M. LeCompte (Republican) 61.9%; ▌Earl E. Glassburner (Democratic) 37.9%; ▌Benson B. Compton (Prohibition) 0.2%
Iowa 5	Paul Cunningham	Republican	1940	Incumbent re-elected.	▌ ✓ Paul Cunningham (Republican) 58.8%; ▌Alvin P. Meyer (Democratic) 41.0%; ▌Richard DeCamp (Prohibition) 0.3%
Iowa 6	James I. Dolliver	Republican	1944	Incumbent re-elected.	▌ ✓ James I. Dolliver (Republican) 68.7%; ▌Francis G. Cutler (Democratic) 31.1%; ▌Roy C. Nelson (Prohibition) 0.2%
Iowa 7	Ben F. Jensen	Republican	1938	Incumbent re-elected.	▌ ✓ Ben F. Jensen (Republican) 67.3%; ▌Thomas J. Keleher (Democratic) 32.6%; ▌Ralph Young (Prohibition) 0.08%
Iowa 8	Charles B. Hoeven	Republican	1942	Incumbent re-elected.	▌ ✓ Charles B. Hoeven (Republican) 99.7%; ▌Charles Warner (Prohibition) 0.3%; ▌Milo Price (Democratic) 0.01%

== Kansas ==
District	Incumbent	Party	First elected	Result	Candidates
Kansas 1	Albert M. Cole	Republican	1944	Incumbent lost re-election. Democratic gain.	▌ ✓ Howard Shultz Miller (Democratic) 51.5%; ▌Albert M. Cole (Republican) 48.5%
Kansas 2	Errett P. Scrivner	Republican	1943	Incumbent re-elected.	▌ ✓ Errett P. Scrivner (Republican) 57.3%; ▌Claude L. Rice (Democratic) 42.7%
Kansas 3	Myron V. George	Republican	1950	Incumbent re-elected.	▌ ✓ Myron V. George (Republican) 59.5%; ▌Fred L. Hedges (Democratic) 40.5%
Kansas 4	Edward Herbert Rees	Republican	1936	Incumbent re-elected.	▌ ✓ Edward Herbert Rees (Republican) 59.4%; ▌Bill Porter (Democratic) 40.6%
Kansas 5	Clifford R. Hope	Republican	1926	Incumbent re-elected.	▌ ✓ Clifford R. Hope (Republican) 70.9%; ▌Art McAnarney (Democratic) 29.1%
Kansas 6	Wint Smith	Republican	1946	Incumbent re-elected.	▌ ✓ Wint Smith (Republican) 62.5%; ▌Horace A. Santry (Democratic) 37.5%

== Kentucky ==
Kentucky lost one seat at reapportionment, and redistricted from 9 districts to 8, adjusting boundaries across the state and dividing the old 8th up among its neighbors.

District	Incumbent	Party	First elected	Result	Candidates
Kentucky 1	Noble Jones Gregory	Democratic	1936	Incumbent re-elected.	▌ ✓ Noble Jones Gregory (Democratic) 65.8%; ▌W. Mallam Lake (Republican) 34.2%
Kentucky 2	Garrett Withers	Democratic	1952 (special)	Incumbent re-elected.	▌ ✓ Garrett Withers (Democratic) 54.4%; ▌David C. Brodie (Republican) 45.6%
Kentucky 3	Thruston Ballard Morton	Republican	1946	Incumbent retired. Republican hold.	▌ ✓ John M. Robsion Jr. (Republican) 54.0%; ▌Boman L. Shamburger (Democratic) 45.7%; ▌H. A. I. Rosenberg (Independent) 0.3%
Kentucky 4	Frank Chelf	Democratic	1944	Incumbent re-elected.	▌ ✓ Frank Chelf (Democratic) 55.9%; ▌Bobby Hutchison Jr. (Republican) 44.1%
Kentucky 5	Brent Spence	Democratic	1930	Incumbent re-elected.	▌ ✓ Brent Spence (Democratic) 55.4%; ▌William D. Cochran (Republican) 44.6%
Kentucky 5	Joe B. Bates; Redistricted from the 8th district	Democratic	1930	Incumbent lost renomination. Democratic loss.	▌ ✓ Brent Spence (Democratic) 55.4%; ▌William D. Cochran (Republican) 44.6%
Kentucky 6	John C. Watts	Democratic	1951 (special)	Incumbent re-elected.	▌ ✓ John C. Watts (Democratic) 56.3%; ▌Leslie A. Henderson (Republican) 43.7%
Kentucky 7	Carl D. Perkins	Democratic	1948	Incumbent re-elected.	▌ ✓ Carl D. Perkins (Democratic) 58.2%; ▌Curtis Clark (Republican) 41.8%
Kentucky 8	James S. Golden; Redistricted from the 9th district	Republican	1948	Incumbent re-elected.	▌ ✓ James S. Golden (Republican) 68.8%; ▌Bill Scalf (Democratic) 31.2%

== Louisiana ==
District	Incumbent	Party	First elected	Result	Candidates
Louisiana 1	F. Edward Hébert	Democratic	1940	Incumbent re-elected.	▌ ✓ F. Edward Hébert (Democratic) 66.4%; ▌George W. Reese Jr. (Republican) 33.6%
Louisiana 2	Hale Boggs	Democratic	1940; 1942 (lost); 1946	Incumbent re-elected.	▌ ✓ Hale Boggs (Democratic); Uncontested
Louisiana 3	Edwin E. Willis	Democratic	1948	Incumbent re-elected.	▌ ✓ Edwin E. Willis (Democratic); Uncontested
Louisiana 4	Overton Brooks	Democratic	1936	Incumbent re-elected.	▌ ✓ Overton Brooks (Democratic); Uncontested
Louisiana 5	Otto Passman	Democratic	1946	Incumbent re-elected.	▌ ✓ Otto Passman (Democratic); Uncontested
Louisiana 6	James H. Morrison	Democratic	1942	Incumbent re-elected.	▌ ✓ James H. Morrison (Democratic); Uncontested
Louisiana 7	Henry D. Larcade Jr.	Democratic	1942	Incumbent retired. Democratic hold.	▌ ✓ T. Ashton Thompson (Democratic); Uncontested
Louisiana 8	A. Leonard Allen	Democratic	1936	Incumbent retired. Democratic hold.	▌ ✓ George S. Long (Democratic); Uncontested

== Maine ==
District	Incumbent	Party	First elected	Result	Candidates
Maine 1	Robert Hale	Republican	1942	Incumbent re-elected.	▌ ✓ Robert Hale (Republican) 61.6%; ▌James A. McVicar (Democratic) 38.4%
Maine 2	Charles P. Nelson	Republican	1948	Incumbent re-elected.	▌ ✓ Charles P. Nelson (Republican) 66.3%; ▌Leland B. Currier (Democratic) 32.9%; ▌A. M. Chiaravalloti (Liberal Dem.) 0.8%
Maine 3	Clifford McIntire	Republican	1951	Incumbent re-elected.	▌ ✓ Clifford McIntire (Republican) 76.2%; ▌Philip R. Sharpe (Democratic) 23.8%

== Maryland ==
Maryland redistricted from 6 to 7 seats, transferring territory from the 2nd to the 3rd and 4th and to a new 7th seat in the Baltimore suburbs.

As of 2022, this was the last time the Republican Party held a majority of congressional districts from Maryland.

District	Incumbent	Party	First elected	Result	Candidates
Maryland 1	Edward T. Miller	Republican	1946	Incumbent re-elected.	▌ ✓ Edward T. Miller (Republican) 61.1%; ▌Dudley Roe (Democratic) 38.9%
Maryland 2	James Devereux	Republican	1950	Incumbent re-elected.	▌ ✓ James Devereux (Republican) 61.4%; ▌A. Gordon Boone (Democratic) 38.6%
Maryland 3	Edward Garmatz	Democratic	1947	Incumbent re-elected.	▌ ✓ Edward Garmatz (Democratic) 70.9%; ▌Jerry Toula (Republican) 29.1%
Maryland 4	George Hyde Fallon	Democratic	1944	Incumbent re-elected.	▌ ✓ George Hyde Fallon (Democratic) 54.7%; ▌Samuel Hopkins (Republican) 45.3%
Maryland 5	Lansdale Sasscer	Democratic	1939	Incumbent retired to run for U.S. senator. Republican gain.	▌ ✓ Frank Small Jr. (Republican) 50.4%; ▌Richard Lankford (Democratic) 49.6%
Maryland 6	J. Glenn Beall	Republican	1942	Incumbent retired to run for U.S. senator. Republican hold.	▌ ✓ DeWitt Hyde (Republican) 57.8%; ▌Stella B. Werner (Democratic) 42.2%
Maryland 7	None (new district)			New seat. Democratic gain.	▌ ✓ Samuel Friedel (Democratic) 51.4%; ▌William F. Laukaitis (Republican) 48.6%

== Massachusetts ==
District	Incumbent	Party	First elected	Result	Candidates
Massachusetts 1	John W. Heselton	Republican	1944	Incumbent re-elected.	▌ ✓ John W. Heselton (Republican) 67.1%; ▌William H. Burns (Democratic) 32.7%; ▌Albert A. Ridyard (Prohibition) 0.2%
Massachusetts 2	Foster Furcolo	Democratic	1948	Incumbent resigned when appointed Treasurer. Democratic hold.	▌ ✓ Edward Boland (Democratic) 51.8%; ▌Troy T. Murray (Republican) 47.9%; ▌Anthony D. Hall (Prohibition) 0.3%
Massachusetts 3	Philip J. Philbin	Democratic	1942	Incumbent re-elected.	▌ ✓ Philip J. Philbin (Democratic) 67.3%; ▌Frank D. Walker (Republican) 32.4%; ▌Isaac Goddard (Prohibition) 0.3%
Massachusetts 4	Harold Donohue	Democratic	1946	Incumbent re-elected.	▌ ✓ Harold Donohue (Democratic) 54.4%; ▌Carl A. Sheridan (Republican) 45.1%; ▌Lillian E. Williams (Prohibition) 0.5%
Massachusetts 5	Edith Nourse Rogers	Republican	1925	Incumbent re-elected.	▌ ✓ Edith Nourse Rogers (Republican) 75.9%; ▌Helen M. Fitzgerald Cullen (Democratic) 23.7%; ▌Miriam S. Hall (Democratic) 0.4%
Massachusetts 6	William H. Bates	Republican	1950	Incumbent re-elected.	▌ ✓ William H. Bates (Republican) 95.1%; ▌Lula B. White (Prohibition) 4.9%
Massachusetts 7	Thomas J. Lane	Democratic	1941	Incumbent re-elected.	▌ ✓ Thomas J. Lane (Democratic) 74.7%; ▌John L. Southwick Jr. (Republican) 24.5%; ▌E. Frank Searle (Prohibition) 0.8%
Massachusetts 8	Angier Goodwin	Republican	1942	Incumbent re-elected.	▌ ✓ Angier Goodwin (Republican) 50.9%; ▌John C. Carr Jr. (Democratic) 48.7%; ▌Alma D. Shaw (Prohibition) 0.4%
Massachusetts 9	Donald W. Nicholson	Republican	1947	Incumbent re-elected.	▌ ✓ Donald W. Nicholson (Republican) 59.1%; ▌James F. O'Neill (Democratic) 40.6%; ▌Ethel I. Ireland (Prohibition) 0.3%
Massachusetts 10	Christian Herter	Republican	1942	Incumbent retired to run for Governor of Massachusetts. Republican hold.	▌ ✓ Laurence Curtis (Republican) 54.3%; ▌Frederick C. Hailer Jr. (Democratic) 45.1%; ▌Katherine L. S. Goddard (Prohibition) 0.6%
Massachusetts 11	John F. Kennedy	Democratic	1946	Incumbent retired to run for U.S. senator. Democratic hold.	▌ ✓ Tip O'Neill (Democratic) 69.3%; ▌Jesse A. Rogers (Republican) 30.3%; ▌William D. Ross (Prohibition) 0.4%
Massachusetts 12	John W. McCormack	Democratic	1928	Incumbent re-elected.	▌ ✓ John W. McCormack (Democratic) 82.2%; ▌James S. Tremblay (Republican) 17.8%
Massachusetts 13	Richard B. Wigglesworth	Republican	1928	Incumbent re-elected.	▌ ✓ Richard B. Wigglesworth (Republican) 60.6%; ▌David J. Crowley (Democratic) 39.4%
Massachusetts 14	Joseph W. Martin Jr.	Republican	1924	Incumbent re-elected.	▌ ✓ Joseph W. Martin Jr. (Republican) 63.2%; ▌Edward F. Doolan (Democratic) 36.5%; ▌Grace Farnsworth Luder (Prohibition) 0.3%

== Michigan ==
Michigan added one seat, and divided the 17th district to form an 18th district, leaving boundaries otherwise unchanged.

District	Incumbent	Party	First elected	Result	Candidates
Michigan 1	Thaddeus M. Machrowicz	Democratic	1950	Incumbent re-elected.	▌ ✓ Thaddeus M. Machrowicz (Democratic) 84.2%; ▌Ralph G. Tenerowicz (Republican) 15.2%; Others: ▌Adam Kujtkowski (Progressive) 0.3%; ▌Peter Koker (Independent) 0.2%
Michigan 2	George Meader	Republican	1950	Incumbent re-elected.	▌ ✓ George Meader (Republican) 63.4%; ▌John P. Dawson (Democratic) 36.3%; Others: ▌Walter S. Haynes (Prohibition) 0.3%; ▌David R. Luce (Progressive) 0.1%
Michigan 3	Paul W. Shafer	Republican	1936	Incumbent re-elected.	▌ ✓ Paul W. Shafer (Republican) 62.0%; ▌Kenneth G. Brown (Democratic) 37.6%; ▌Clarence O. Button (Prohibition) 0.4%
Michigan 4	Clare Hoffman	Republican	1934	Incumbent re-elected.	▌ ✓ Clare Hoffman (Republican) 66.6%; ▌Murle E. Gorton (Democratic) 33.0%; ▌Ralph C. March (Prohibition) 0.4%
Michigan 5	Gerald Ford	Republican	1948	Incumbent re-elected.	▌ ✓ Gerald Ford (Republican) 66.3%; ▌Vincent E. O'Neill (Democratic) 33.3%; Others: ▌Ella Fruin (Prohibition) 0.4%; ▌William Glenn (Progressive) 0.1%
Michigan 6	William W. Blackney	Republican	1938	Incumbent retired. Republican hold.	▌ ✓ Kit Clardy (Republican) 52.6%; ▌Donald Hayworth (Democratic) 47.0%; ▌Egbert Street (Prohibition) 0.4%
Michigan 7	Jesse P. Wolcott	Republican	1930	Incumbent re-elected.	▌ ✓ Jesse P. Wolcott (Republican) 60.3%; ▌Ira D. McCoy (Democratic) 39.5%; ▌Clarence Dykehouse (Prohibition) 0.2%
Michigan 8	Fred L. Crawford	Republican	1934	Incumbent lost renomination. Republican hold.	▌ ✓ Alvin Morell Bentley (Republican) 66.6%; ▌Clarence V. Smazel (Democratic) 33.0%; ▌Marion A. Jones (Prohibition) 0.5%
Michigan 9	Ruth Thompson	Republican	1950	Incumbent re-elected.	▌ ✓ Ruth Thompson (Republican) 59.5%; ▌John H. Piercey (Democratic) 40.1%; ▌Glenn Root (Prohibition) 0.4%
Michigan 10	Roy O. Woodruff	Republican	1920	Incumbent retired. Republican hold.	▌ ✓ Elford Albin Cederberg (Republican) 67.5%; ▌William J. Kelly (Democratic) 32.5%
Michigan 11	Charles E. Potter	Republican	1947	Incumbent retired to run for U.S. senator. Republican hold.	▌ ✓ Victor A. Knox (Republican) 59.3%; ▌Prentiss M. Brown Jr. (Democratic) 40.7%
Michigan 12	John B. Bennett	Republican	1946	Incumbent re-elected.	▌ ✓ John B. Bennett (Republican) 58.2%; ▌E. Burr Sherwood (Democratic) 41.8%
Michigan 13	George D. O'Brien	Democratic	1948	Incumbent re-elected.	▌ ✓ George D. O'Brien (Democratic) 64.8%; ▌Clarence J. McLeod (Republican) 35.1%; ▌Karl V. Kurtz (Prohibition) 0.2%
Michigan 14	Louis C. Rabaut	Democratic	1948	Incumbent re-elected.	▌ ✓ Louis C. Rabaut (Democratic) 53.0%; ▌Richard Durant (Republican) 46.9%; ▌Herman G. Ottmer (Prohibition) 0.1%
Michigan 15	John Dingell Sr.	Democratic	1932	Incumbent re-elected.	▌ ✓ John Dingell Sr. (Democratic) 66.7%; ▌Gregory M. Pillon (Republican) 33.2%; ▌Clyde Watt (Prohibition) 0.1%
Michigan 16	John Lesinski Jr.	Democratic	1950	Incumbent re-elected.	▌ ✓ John Lesinski Jr. (Democratic) 60.7%; ▌Harold J. Smith (Republican) 38.8%; Others: ▌Margaret Nowak (Progressive) 0.3%; ▌Earl A. Johnson (Prohibition) 0.2%
Michigan 17	None (new district)			New seat. Republican gain.	▌ ✓ Charles G. Oakman (Republican) 52.9%; ▌Martha Griffiths (Democratic) 47.0%; ▌Walter D. Carpenter (Prohibition) 0.2%
Michigan 18	George A. Dondero; Redistricted from the 17th district	Republican	1932	Incumbent re-elected.	▌ ✓ George A. Dondero (Republican) 56.2%; ▌Arthur J. Law (Democratic) 43.6%; Others: ▌Rene Hall (Prohibition) 0.2%; ▌Dwight I. Todd (Progressive) 0.07%

== Minnesota ==
District	Incumbent	Party	First elected	Result	Candidates
Minnesota 1	August H. Andresen	Republican	1934	Incumbent re-elected.	▌ ✓ August H. Andresen (Republican) 69.4%; ▌George Alfson (DFL) 30.6%
Minnesota 2	Joseph P. O'Hara	Republican	1940	Incumbent re-elected.	▌ ✓ Joseph P. O'Hara (Republican) 67.7%; ▌Richard T. Malone (DFL) 32.3%
Minnesota 3	Roy Wier	Democratic (DFL)	1948	Incumbent re-elected.	▌ ✓ Roy Wier (DFL) 52.2%; ▌Ed Willow (Republican) 47.8%
Minnesota 4	Eugene McCarthy	Democratic (DFL)	1948	Incumbent re-elected.	▌ ✓ Eugene McCarthy (DFL) 61.7%; ▌Roger G. Kennedy (Republican) 38.3%
Minnesota 5	Walter Judd	Republican	1942	Incumbent re-elected.	▌ ✓ Walter Judd (Republican) 59.2%; ▌Karl Rolvaag (DFL) 40.8%
Minnesota 6	Fred Marshall	Democratic (DFL)	1948	Incumbent re-elected.	▌ ✓ Fred Marshall (DFL) 52.6%; ▌J. Arthur Bensen (Republican) 47.4%
Minnesota 7	H. Carl Andersen	Republican	1938	Incumbent re-elected.	▌ ✓ H. Carl Andersen (Republican) 62.6%; ▌James M. Youngdale (DFL) 37.4%
Minnesota 8	John Blatnik	Democratic (DFL)	1946	Incumbent re-elected.	▌ ✓ John Blatnik (DFL) 62.6%; ▌Ernest R. Orchard (Republican) 37.4%
Minnesota 9	Harold Hagen	Republican	1944	Incumbent re-elected.	▌ ✓ Harold Hagen (Republican) 60.5%; ▌Curtiss Olson (DFL) 39.5%

== Mississippi ==
Mississippi lost 1 seat in reapportionment and redistricted from 7 seats to 6; in addition to other boundary adjustments a substantial portion of the old 4th district was moved into the 1st, and 4th district incumbent Abernethy defeated 1st district incumbent Rankin in the Democratic primary.

District	Incumbent	Party	First elected	Result	Candidates
Mississippi 1	John E. Rankin	Democratic	1920	Incumbent lost renomination. Democratic loss.	▌ ✓ Thomas Abernethy (Democratic); Uncontested
Mississippi 1	Thomas Abernethy; Redistricted from the 4th district	Democratic	1942	Incumbent re-elected.	▌ ✓ Thomas Abernethy (Democratic); Uncontested
Mississippi 2	Jamie Whitten	Democratic	1941	Incumbent re-elected.	▌ ✓ Jamie Whitten (Democratic); Uncontested
Mississippi 3	Frank E. Smith	Democratic	1950	Incumbent re-elected.	▌ ✓ Frank E. Smith (Democratic) 87.2%; ▌Paul Clark (Republican) 12.8%
Mississippi 4	John Bell Williams; Redistricted from the 7th district	Democratic	1946	Incumbent re-elected.	▌ ✓ John Bell Williams (Democratic); Uncontested
Mississippi 5	W. Arthur Winstead	Democratic	1942	Incumbent re-elected.	▌ ✓ W. Arthur Winstead (Democratic) 94.1%; ▌Henry J. Maddox (Republican) 5.9%
Mississippi 6	William M. Colmer	Democratic	1932	Incumbent re-elected.	▌ ✓ William M. Colmer (Democratic); Uncontested

== Missouri ==
District	Incumbent	Party	First elected	Result	Candidates
Missouri 1	Frank M. Karsten; Redistricted from the 13th district	Democratic	1946	Incumbent re-elected.	▌ ✓ Frank M. Karsten (Democratic) 64.2%; ▌Eugene A. Miller (Republican) 35.8%
Missouri 2	Thomas B. Curtis; Redistricted from the 12th district	Republican	1950	Incumbent re-elected.	▌ ✓ Thomas B. Curtis (Republican) 56.9%; ▌Donald McClanahan (Democratic) 43.1%
Missouri 3	Claude I. Bakewell; Redistricted from the 11th district	Republican	1951	Incumbent lost re-election. Democratic gain.	▌ ✓ Leonor Sullivan (Democratic) 64.8%; ▌Claude I. Bakewell (Republican) 35.2%
Missouri 4	Leonard Irving	Democratic	1948	Incumbent lost re-election. Republican gain.	▌ ✓ Jeffrey P. Hillelson (Republican) 53.3%; ▌Leonard Irving (Democratic) 46.7%
Missouri 5	Richard Bolling	Democratic	1948	Incumbent re-elected.	▌ ✓ Richard Bolling (Democratic) 56.0%; ▌Frank C. Rayburn (Republican) 44.0%
Missouri 6	Phil J. Welch; Redistricted from the 3rd district	Democratic	1948	Incumbent retired to run for Governor of Missouri. Republican gain.	▌ ✓ William C. Cole (Republican) 52.4%; ▌Robert O. Richardson (Democratic) 47.6%
Missouri 7	Dewey Short	Republican	1934	Incumbent re-elected.	▌ ✓ Dewey Short (Republican) 61.7%; ▌John Hosmer (Democratic) 38.3%
Missouri 7	Orland K. Armstrong; Redistricted from the 6th district	Republican	1950	Incumbent retired. Republican loss.	▌ ✓ Dewey Short (Republican) 61.7%; ▌John Hosmer (Democratic) 38.3%
Missouri 8	A. S. J. Carnahan	Democratic	1948	Incumbent re-elected.	▌ ✓ A. S. J. Carnahan (Democratic) 52.8%; ▌Francis E. Howard (Republican) 47.2%
Missouri 9	Clarence Cannon	Democratic	1922	Incumbent re-elected.	▌ ✓ Clarence Cannon (Democratic) 54.7%; ▌Samuel W. Arnold (Republican) 45.3%
Missouri 9	Clare Magee; Redistricted from the 1st district	Democratic	1948	Incumbent retired. Democratic loss.	▌ ✓ Clarence Cannon (Democratic) 54.7%; ▌Samuel W. Arnold (Republican) 45.3%
Missouri 10	Paul C. Jones	Democratic	1948	Incumbent re-elected.	▌ ✓ Paul C. Jones (Democratic) 60.7%; ▌Andrew Sandegren (Republican) 39.3%
Missouri 11	Morgan M. Moulder; Redistricted from the 2nd district	Democratic	1948	Incumbent re-elected.	▌ ✓ Morgan M. Moulder (Democratic) 50.4%; ▌Max Schwabe (Republican) 49.6%

== Montana ==
District	Incumbent	Party	First elected	Result	Candidates
Montana 1	Mike Mansfield	Democratic	1942	Incumbent retired to run for U.S. senator. Democratic hold.	▌ ✓ Lee Metcalf (Democratic) 50.3%; ▌Wellington D. Rankin (Republican) 48.9%; ▌Leverne Hamilton (Socialist) 0.8%
Montana 2	Wesley A. D'Ewart	Republican	1945	Incumbent re-elected.	▌ ✓ Wesley A. D'Ewart (Republican) 62.0%; ▌Willard E. Fraser (Democratic) 38.0%

== Nebraska ==
District	Incumbent	Party	First elected	Result	Candidates
Nebraska 1	Carl Curtis	Republican	1938	Incumbent re-elected.	▌ ✓ Carl Curtis (Republican) 72.0%; ▌Samuel Freeman (Democratic) 28.0%
Nebraska 2	Howard Buffett	Republican	1950	Incumbent retired. Republican hold.	▌ ✓ Roman Hruska (Republican) 56.1%; ▌James A. Hart (Democratic) 43.9%
Nebraska 3	Robert Dinsmore Harrison	Republican	1951	Incumbent re-elected.	▌ ✓ Robert Dinsmore Harrison (Republican) 71.9%; ▌Alan A. Dusatko (Democratic) 28.1%
Nebraska 4	Arthur L. Miller	Republican	1942	Incumbent re-elected.	▌ ✓ Arthur L. Miller (Republican) 73.3%; ▌Francis D. Lee (Democratic) 26.7%

== Nevada ==
District	Incumbent	Party	First elected	Result	Candidates
Nevada at-large	Walter S. Baring Jr.	Democratic	1948	Incumbent lost re-election. Republican gain.	▌ ✓ Clarence Clifton Young (Republican) 50.5%; ▌Walter S. Baring Jr. (Democratic) 49.5%

== New Hampshire ==
District	Incumbent	Party	First elected	Result	Candidates
New Hampshire 1	Chester Earl Merrow	Republican	1942	Incumbent re-elected.	▌ ✓ Chester Earl Merrow (Republican) 60.2%; ▌Peter Poirier (Democratic) 39.8%
New Hampshire 2	Norris Cotton	Republican	1946	Incumbent re-elected.	▌ ✓ Norris Cotton (Republican) 66.4%; ▌John Guay (Democratic) 33.6%

== New Jersey ==
District	Incumbent	Party	First elected	Result	Candidates
New Jersey 1	Charles A. Wolverton	Republican	1926	Incumbent re-elected.	▌ ✓ Charles A. Wolverton (Republican) 55.0%; ▌Alfred R. Pierce (Democratic) 44.7%; ▌Kent A. Smitheman (Progressive) 0.2%
New Jersey 2	T. Millet Hand	Republican	1944	Incumbent re-elected.	▌ ✓ T. Millet Hand (Republican) 63.4%; ▌Charles Edward Rupp (Democratic) 36.6%
New Jersey 3	James C. Auchincloss	Republican	1942	Incumbent re-elected.	▌ ✓ James C. Auchincloss (Republican) 64.4%; ▌John W. Zimmermann (Democratic) 35.0%; ▌Marvin H. Fish (Progressive) 0.6%
New Jersey 4	Charles R. Howell	Democratic	1948	Incumbent re-elected.	▌ ✓ Charles R. Howell (Democratic) 54.7%; ▌John J. Inglesby (Republican) 45.3%
New Jersey 5	Charles A. Eaton	Republican	1924	Incumbent retired. Republican hold.	▌ ✓ Peter Frelinghuysen Jr. (Republican) 62.2%; ▌Aldona E. Appleton (Democratic) 37.8%; ▌Clinton A. Smith (Prohibition) 0.06%
New Jersey 6	Clifford P. Case	Republican	1944	Incumbent re-elected.	▌ ✓ Clifford P. Case (Republican) 63.9%; ▌H. Frank Pettit (Democratic) 35.4%; ▌Ithamar Quigley (Prohibition) 0.6%
New Jersey 7	William B. Widnall	Republican	1950	Incumbent re-elected.	▌ ✓ William B. Widnall (Republican) 68.3%; ▌Vito A. Concilio (Democratic) 31.7%
New Jersey 8	Gordon Canfield	Republican	1940	Incumbent re-elected.	▌ ✓ Gordon Canfield (Republican) 62.6%; ▌John J. Winberry (Democratic) 35.0%; Others: ▌Peter J. Toth (Increase Jobless Pay) 2.2%; ▌Edith Claxton (Prohibition) 0.1%; ▌Harry Santhouse (Socialist Labor) 0.1%
New Jersey 9	Frank C. Osmers Jr.	Republican	1951	Incumbent re-elected.	▌ ✓ Frank C. Osmers Jr. (Republican) 66.2%; ▌William H. McNulty (Democratic) 33.4%; ▌Angelica Boles (Progressive) 0.4%
New Jersey 10	Peter W. Rodino	Democratic	1948	Incumbent re-elected.	▌ ✓ Peter W. Rodino (Democratic) 56.9%; ▌Alexander J. Matturri (Republican) 41.8%; Others: ▌Lawrence Sutherland (Prohibition) 1.0%; ▌Michael Burns (Square Deal) 0.4%
New Jersey 11	Hugh J. Addonizio	Democratic	1948	Incumbent re-elected.	▌ ✓ Hugh J. Addonizio (Democratic) 52.2%; ▌William O. Barnes Jr. (Republican) 46.3%; Others: ▌William E. Bohannon (Socialist Workers) 1.3%; ▌Walter F. Hartt (Prohibition) 0.2%
New Jersey 12	Robert Kean	Republican	1938	Incumbent re-elected.	▌ ✓ Robert Kean (Republican) 54.8%; ▌Martin S. Fox (Democratic) 45.2%
New Jersey 13	Alfred Dennis Sieminski	Democratic	1950	Incumbent re-elected.	▌ ✓ Alfred Dennis Sieminski (Democratic) 55.1%; ▌Julius D. Canter (Republican) 41.2%; ▌Edmund T. Kalinowski (People's Choice) 3.6%
New Jersey 14	Edward J. Hart	Democratic	1934	Incumbent re-elected.	▌ ✓ Edward J. Hart (Democratic) 51.5%; ▌William J. Bozzuffi (Republican) 45.4%; ▌Thomas F. Conroy (People's Choice) 3.1%

== New Mexico ==
District	Incumbent	Party	First elected	Result	Candidates
New Mexico at-large	John J. Dempsey	Democratic	1950	Incumbent re-elected.	▌ ✓ John J. Dempsey (Democratic) 26.2%; ▌ ✓ Antonio M. Fernández (Democratic) 25.9%; ▌Homer J. Berkshire (Republican) 24.2%; ▌Ed Guthmann (Republican) 23.7%
New Mexico at-large	Antonio M. Fernández	Democratic	1942	Incumbent re-elected.	▌ ✓ John J. Dempsey (Democratic) 26.2%; ▌ ✓ Antonio M. Fernández (Democratic) 25.9%; ▌Homer J. Berkshire (Republican) 24.2%; ▌Ed Guthmann (Republican) 23.7%

== New York ==
New York redistricted from 45 seats to 43, losing a seat in Long Island and another upstate.

District	Incumbent	Party	First elected	Result	Candidates
New York 1	Ernest Greenwood	Democratic	1950	Incumbent lost re-election. Republican gain.	▌ ✓ Stuyvesant Wainwright (Republican) 60.4%; ▌Ernest Greenwood (Democratic) 39.3%; ▌Otto Skottedal (American Labor) 0.3%
New York 2	Leonard W. Hall	Republican	1938	Incumbent retired to run for Nassau County surrogate. Republican hold.	▌ ✓ Steven Derounian (Republican) 68.8%; ▌Joseph Liff (Democratic) 28.4%; ▌Herbert H. Stroup (Liberal) 2.1%; ▌Stanley Faulkner (American Labor) 0.6%
New York 3	None (new district)			New seat. Republican gain.	▌ ✓ Frank J. Becker (Republican) 65.4%; ▌Richard A. O'Leary (Democratic) 31.0%; ▌Eugene M. Theuman (Liberal) 2.9%; ▌Henry Dolimer (American Labor) 0.7%
New York 4	Henry J. Latham; Redistricted from the 3rd district	Republican	1944	Incumbent re-elected.	▌ ✓ Henry J. Latham (Republican) 62.6%; ▌Joseph J. Perrini (Democratic) 36.0%; ▌Herbert A. Shingler (American Labor) 1.4%
New York 5	L. Gary Clemente; Redistricted from the 4th district	Democratic	1948	Incumbent lost re-election. Republican gain.	▌ ✓ Albert H. Bosch (Republican) 53.5%; ▌L. Gary Clemente (Democratic) 45.3%; ▌Hugh Mulzac (American Labor) 1.2%
New York 6	Robert Tripp Ross; Redistricted from the 5th district	Republican	February 19, 1952 (special)	Incumbent lost re-election. Democratic gain.	▌ ✓ Lester Holtzman (Democratic) 49.2%; ▌Robert Tripp Ross (Republican) 48.9%; ▌Morris Pottish (American Labor) 1.9%
New York 7	James J. Delaney; Redistricted from the 6th district	Democratic	1944; 1946 (defeated); 1948	Incumbent re-elected.	▌ ✓ James J. Delaney (Democratic) 51.0%; ▌William Adam Schulz (Republican) 47.3%; ▌James Garry (American Labor) 1.7%
New York 8	Victor Anfuso	Democratic	1950	Incumbent retired. Democratic loss.	▌ ✓ Louis B. Heller (Democratic) 65.3%; ▌Benjamin F. Westervelt Jr. (Republican) 32.6%; ▌Beny Sher (American Labor) 2.1%
New York 8	Louis B. Heller; Redistricted from the 7th district	Democratic	1949	Incumbent re-elected.	▌ ✓ Louis B. Heller (Democratic) 65.3%; ▌Benjamin F. Westervelt Jr. (Republican) 32.6%; ▌Beny Sher (American Labor) 2.1%
New York 9	Eugene Keogh	Democratic	1936	Incumbent re-elected.	▌ ✓ Eugene Keogh (Democratic) 61.1%; ▌Joseph M. Soviero (Republican) 35.7%; ▌Helen Wishnofsky (American Labor) 3.1%
New York 10	Edna F. Kelly	Democratic	1949	Incumbent re-elected.	▌ ✓ Edna F. Kelly (Democratic) 71.2%; ▌George W. Thomas (Republican) 28.8%
New York 11	Emanuel Celler; Redistricted from the 15th district	Democratic	1922	Incumbent re-elected.	▌ ✓ Emanuel Celler (Democratic) 73.8%; ▌Henry D. Dorfman (Republican) 21.6%; ▌Terry Rosenbaum (American Labor) 4.2%; ▌Max Gilgoff^{†} (American Labor) 0.4%
New York 12	James J. Heffernan; Redistricted from the 11th district	Democratic	1940	Incumbent retired. Republican gain.	▌ ✓ Francis E. Dorn (Republican) 52.7%; ▌Donald L. O'Toole (Democratic) 45.6%; ▌Clifford T. McAvoy (American Labor) 1.8%
New York 12	Donald L. O'Toole; Redistricted from the 13th district	Democratic	1936	Incumbent lost re-election. Democratic loss.	▌ ✓ Francis E. Dorn (Republican) 52.7%; ▌Donald L. O'Toole (Democratic) 45.6%; ▌Clifford T. McAvoy (American Labor) 1.8%
New York 13	Abraham J. Multer; Redistricted from the 14th district	Democratic	1947	Incumbent re-elected.	▌ ✓ Abraham J. Multer (Democratic) 68.3%; ▌P. Vincent Landi (Republican) 27.8%; ▌Abraham Beacher (American Labor) 2.4%; ▌Si Gerson (Peoples Rights) 1.5%
New York 14	John J. Rooney; Redistricted from the 12th district	Democratic	1944	Incumbent re-elected.	▌ ✓ John J. Rooney (Democratic) 64.2%; ▌Jacob P. Lefkowitz (Republican) 33.2%; ▌Charles Cafiero (American Labor) 2.5%
New York 15	James J. Murphy; Redistricted from the 16th district	Democratic	1948	Incumbent lost re-election. Republican gain.	▌ ✓ John H. Ray (Republican) 57.9%; ▌James J. Murphy (Democratic) 41.5%; ▌Jean Militean (American Labor) 0.5%
New York 16	Adam Clayton Powell Jr. Redistricted from the 22nd district	Democratic	1944	Incumbent re-elected.	▌ ✓ Adam Clayton Powell Jr. (Democratic) 73.9%; ▌Richard L. Baltimore Jr. (Republican) 16.2%; ▌Clarence Francis (Liberal) 7.3%; ▌Andronicus Jacobs (American Labor) 2.6%
New York 17	Frederic Coudert Jr.	Republican	1946	Incumbent re-elected.	▌ ✓ Frederic Coudert Jr. (Republican) 57.0%; ▌Harry Grossman (Democratic) 40.7%; ▌Moses C. Weinman (American Labor) 2.2%
New York 18	James G. Donovan	Democratic	1950	Incumbent re-elected.	▌ ✓ James G. Donovan (Democratic) 92.6%; ▌Vito Magli (American Labor) 7.4%
New York 19	Arthur G. Klein	Democratic	1946	Incumbent re-elected.	▌ ✓ Arthur G. Klein (Democratic) 66.0%; ▌Edward I. Goldberg (Republican) 29.7%; ▌Joseph Selterman (American Labor) 4.3%
New York 20	Franklin D. Roosevelt Jr.	Democratic	1949	Incumbent re-elected.	▌ ✓ Franklin D. Roosevelt Jr. (Democratic) 60.2%; ▌Clarence C. Van Bell (Republican) 36.8%; ▌Arthur D. Kahn (American Labor) 3.0%
New York 21	Jacob Javits	Republican	1946	Incumbent re-elected.	▌ ✓ Jacob Javits (Republican) 63.4%; ▌John C. Hart (Democratic) 33.6%; ▌William Mandel (American Labor) 2.9%
New York 22	Sidney A. Fine; Redistricted from the 23rd district	Democratic	1950	Incumbent re-elected.	▌ ✓ Sidney A. Fine (Democratic) 58.0%; ▌Martin Greene (Republican) 24.8%; ▌David I. Wells (Liberal) 13.9%; ▌Anita Friedlander (American Labor) 3.3%
New York 23	Isidore Dollinger; Redistricted from the 24th district	Democratic	1948	Incumbent re-elected.	▌ ✓ Isidore Dollinger (Democratic) 63.8%; ▌Sidney S. Flaum (Republican) 18.9%; ▌Harry Kavesh (Liberal) 11.7%; ▌Howard Fast (American Labor) 5.6%
New York 24	Charles A. Buckley; Redistricted from the 25th district	Democratic	1934	Incumbent re-elected.	▌ ✓ Charles A. Buckley (Democratic) 46.5%; ▌Solon S. Kane (Republican) 32.8%; ▌Herman Woskow (Liberal) 16.6%; ▌Carl Trost (American Labor) 4.1%
New York 25	Christopher C. McGrath; Redistricted from the 26th district	Democratic	1948	Incumbent retired to run for Bronx County surrogate. Republican gain.	▌ ✓ Paul A. Fino (Republican) 50.1%; ▌Bernard J. O'Connell (Democratic) 40.4%; ▌Louis Schifrin (Liberal) 7.8%; ▌August Buhr (American Labor) 1.7%
New York 26	Ralph A. Gamble; Redistricted from the 28th district	Republican	1937	Incumbent re-elected.	▌ ✓ Ralph A. Gamble (Republican) 67.3%; ▌Flora Chudson (Democratic) 32.0%; ▌Pasquale Barile (American Labor) 0.7%
New York 27	Ralph W. Gwinn	Republican	1944	Incumbent re-elected.	▌ ✓ Ralph W. Gwinn (Republican) 58.5%; ▌George A. Brenner (Democratic) 40.9%; ▌Herbert C. Hewitt (American Labor) 0.6%
New York 28	Katharine St. George; Redistricted from the 29th district	Republican	1946	Incumbent re-elected.	▌ ✓ Katharine St. George (Republican) 65.6%; ▌Marion K. Sanders (Democratic) 33.9%; ▌Harold Chown (American Labor) 0.5%
New York 29	J. Ernest Wharton; Redistricted from the 30th district	Republican	1950	Incumbent re-elected.	▌ ✓ J. Ernest Wharton (Republican) 69.8%; ▌Walter Donnaruma (Democratic) 28.2%; ▌Edward Friss (Liberal) 1.7%; ▌Joseph Kooperman (American Labor) 0.4%
New York 30	Leo W. O'Brien; Redistricted from the 32nd district	Democratic	1952 (special)	Incumbent re-elected.	▌ ✓ Leo W. O'Brien (Democratic) 53.7%; ▌John F. Forner Jr. (Republican) 46.0%; ▌Scott K. Gray Jr. (American Labor) 0.2%
New York 31	Dean P. Taylor; Redistricted from the 33rd district	Republican	1942	Incumbent re-elected.	▌ ✓ Dean P. Taylor (Republican) 70.6%; ▌Helen Nolan Neil (Democratic) 27.3%; ▌John H. Sullivan (Liberal) 2.1%
New York 32	Bernard W. Kearney; Redistricted from the 31st district	Republican	1942	Incumbent re-elected.	▌ ✓ Bernard W. Kearney (Republican) 67.4%; ▌David C. Prince (Democratic) 30.5%; ▌Herbert M. Merrill (Liberal) 2.1%
New York 33	Clarence E. Kilburn; Redistricted from the 34th district	Republican	1940	Incumbent re-elected.	▌ ✓ Clarence E. Kilburn (Republican) 69.0%; ▌Maurice N. McGrath (Democratic) 29.2%; ▌William J. Delo Jr. (Liberal) 1.8%
New York 34	William R. Williams; Redistricted from the 35th district	Republican	1950	Incumbent re-elected.	▌ ✓ William R. Williams (Republican) 58.8%; ▌Charles Ray Wilson (Democratic) 39.3%; ▌Anthony Blasting (Liberal) 1.7%; ▌Michael A. Jimenez (American Labor) 0.2%
New York 35	R. Walter Riehlman; Redistricted from the 36th district	Republican	1946	Incumbent re-elected.	▌ ✓ R. Walter Riehlman (Republican) 63.2%; ▌Arthur B. McGuire (Democratic) 36.5%; ▌Lillian Reiner (American Labor) 0.2%
New York 36	John Taber; Redistricted from the 38th district	Republican	1922	Incumbent re-elected.	▌ ✓ John Taber (Republican) 69.9%; ▌Donald J. O'Connor (Democratic) 29.9%; ▌Lila K. Larson (American Labor) 0.2%
New York 37	Edwin Arthur Hall	Republican	1939	Incumbent lost renomination. Republican loss.	▌ ✓ W. Sterling Cole (Republican) 69.4%; ▌Jean Ivory (Democratic) 30.4%; ▌Robert L. Blandford (American Labor) 0.2%
New York 37	W. Sterling Cole; Redistricted from the 39th district	Republican	1934	Incumbent re-elected.	▌ ✓ W. Sterling Cole (Republican) 69.4%; ▌Jean Ivory (Democratic) 30.4%; ▌Robert L. Blandford (American Labor) 0.2%
New York 38	Kenneth Keating; Redistricted from the 40th district	Republican	1946	Incumbent re-elected.	▌ ✓ Kenneth Keating (Republican) 69.3%; ▌Victor Kruppenbacher (Democratic) 30.3%; ▌Manuel Gitlin (American Labor) 0.4%
New York 39	Harold C. Ostertag; Redistricted from the 41st district	Republican	1950	Incumbent re-elected.	▌ ✓ Harold C. Ostertag (Republican) 65.8%; ▌O. Richard Judson (Democratic) 34.0%; ▌Michael J. Burke (American Labor) 0.2%
New York 40	William E. Miller; Redistricted from the 42nd district	Republican	1950	Incumbent re-elected.	▌ ✓ William E. Miller (Republican) 59.6%; ▌E. Dent Lackey (Democratic) 40.2%; ▌John Touralchuk (American Labor) 0.2%
New York 41	Edmund P. Radwan; Redistricted from the 43rd district	Republican	1950	Incumbent re-elected.	▌ ✓ Edmund P. Radwan (Republican) 55.9%; ▌Anthony F. Tauriello (Democratic) 44.1%
New York 42	John Cornelius Butler; Redistricted from the 44th district	Republican	1950	Incumbent lost renomination. Republican hold.	▌ ✓ John R. Pillion (Republican) 55.2%; ▌Chester C. Gorski (Democratic) 44.6%; ▌Charles T. Asque (American Labor) 0.1%
New York 43	Daniel A. Reed; Redistricted from the 45th district	Republican	1918	Incumbent re-elected.	▌ ✓ Daniel A. Reed (Republican) 66.2%; ▌Harry D. Johnson (Democratic) 32.0%; ▌Lyle H. Furlong (Liberal) 1.6%; ▌Axel W. Berggren (American Labor) 0.2%

== North Carolina ==
District	Incumbent	Party	First elected	Result	Candidates
North Carolina 1	Herbert Covington Bonner	Democratic	1940	Incumbent re-elected.	▌ ✓ Herbert Covington Bonner (Democratic); Uncontested
North Carolina 2	John H. Kerr	Democratic	1923	Incumbent lost renomination. Democratic hold.	▌ ✓ Lawrence H. Fountain (Democratic) 94.8%; ▌W. B. White (Republican) 5.2%
North Carolina 3	Graham Arthur Barden	Democratic	1934	Incumbent re-elected.	▌ ✓ Graham Arthur Barden (Democratic) 76.1%; ▌Everette L. Peterson (Republican) 23.9%
North Carolina 4	Harold D. Cooley	Democratic	1934	Incumbent re-elected.	▌ ✓ Harold D. Cooley (Democratic) 75.3%; ▌Paul C. West (Republican) 24.7%
North Carolina 5	R. Thurmond Chatham	Democratic	1948	Incumbent re-elected.	▌ ✓ R. Thurmond Chatham (Democratic) 98.2%; ▌Forest Bedell (Republican) 1.8%; ▌Jeff D. Johnson (Republican) 0.06%
North Carolina 6	Carl T. Durham	Democratic	1938	Incumbent re-elected.	▌ ✓ Carl T. Durham (Democratic) 69.5%; ▌Louis F. Ferree (Republican) 30.5%
North Carolina 7	Frank Ertel Carlyle	Democratic	1948	Incumbent re-elected.	▌ ✓ Frank Ertel Carlyle (Democratic) 98.5%; ▌D. R. Johnson (Republican) 1.5%; ▌E. N. Pait (Republican) 0.002%
North Carolina 8	Charles B. Deane	Democratic	1946	Incumbent re-elected.	▌ ✓ Charles B. Deane (Democratic) 59.9%; ▌Walter B. Love (Republican) 40.1%
North Carolina 9	Robert L. Doughton	Democratic	1910	Incumbent retired. Democratic hold.	▌ ✓ Hugh Quincy Alexander (Democratic) 51.5%; ▌Walter P. Johnson (Republican) 48.5%
North Carolina 10	Hamilton C. Jones	Democratic	1946	Incumbent lost re-election. Republican gain.	▌ ✓ Charles R. Jonas (Republican) 57.4%; ▌Hamilton C. Jones (Democratic) 42.6%
North Carolina 11	Woodrow W. Jones	Democratic	1950	Incumbent re-elected.	▌ ✓ Woodrow W. Jones (Democratic) 63.0%; ▌George M. Pritchard (Republican) 37.0%
North Carolina 12	Monroe Minor Redden	Democratic	1946	Incumbent retired. Democratic hold.	▌ ✓ George A. Shuford (Democratic) 56.9%; ▌Hugh Montieth (Republican) 43.1%

== North Dakota ==
District	Incumbent	Party	First elected	Result	Candidates
North Dakota at-large	Usher L. Burdick	Republican-NPL	1948	Incumbent re-elected.	▌ ✓ Usher L. Burdick (Republican-NPL) 46.7%; ▌ ✓ Otto Krueger (Republican) 40.4%; ▌Edward Nesemeier (Democratic) 12.8%
North Dakota at-large	Fred G. Aandahl	Republican	1950	Incumbent retired to run for U.S. senator. Republican hold.	▌ ✓ Usher L. Burdick (Republican-NPL) 46.7%; ▌ ✓ Otto Krueger (Republican) 40.4%; ▌Edward Nesemeier (Democratic) 12.8%

== Ohio ==
Ohio's representation was not changed at reapportionment, but redistricted its at-large district into a 23rd district and also removed the 11th district in south Ohio, creating two new districts around Cleveland.

District	Incumbent	Party	First elected	Result	Candidates
Ohio 1	Charles H. Elston	Republican	1938	Incumbent retired. Republican hold.	▌ ✓ Gordon H. Scherer (Republican) 61.6%; ▌Walter A. Kelly (Democratic) 38.4%
Ohio 2	William E. Hess	Republican	1950	Incumbent re-elected.	▌ ✓ William E. Hess (Republican) 56.6%; ▌Earl T. Wagner (Democratic) 43.4%
Ohio 3	Paul F. Schenck	Republican	1951	Incumbent re-elected.	▌ ✓ Paul F. Schenck (Republican) 51.1%; ▌Thomas B. Talbot (Democratic) 48.9%
Ohio 4	William Moore McCulloch	Republican	1947	Incumbent re-elected.	▌ ✓ William Moore McCulloch (Republican) 68.3%; ▌Carleton Carl Reiser (Democratic) 31.7%
Ohio 5	Cliff Clevenger	Republican	1938	Incumbent re-elected.	▌ ✓ Cliff Clevenger (Republican) 63.2%; ▌Dan Batt (Democratic) 36.8%
Ohio 6	James G. Polk	Democratic	1948	Incumbent re-elected.	▌ ✓ James G. Polk (Democratic) 50.1%; ▌Leo Blackburn (Republican) 49.9%
Ohio 7	Clarence J. Brown	Republican	1938	Incumbent re-elected.	▌ ✓ Clarence J. Brown (Republican); Uncontested
Ohio 8	Jackson Edward Betts	Republican	1950	Incumbent re-elected.	▌ ✓ Jackson Edward Betts (Republican) 68.7%; ▌Henry P. Drake (Democratic) 31.3%
Ohio 9	Frazier Reams	Independent	1950	Incumbent re-elected.	▌ ✓ Frazier Reams (Independent) 40.9%; ▌Thomas H. Burke (Democratic) 33.4%; ▌Gilmore Flues (Republican) 25.7%
Ohio 10	Thomas A. Jenkins	Republican	1924	Incumbent re-elected.	▌ ✓ Thomas A. Jenkins (Republican) 64.0%; ▌Delmar A. Canaday (Democratic) 36.0%
Ohio 10	Walter E. Brehm; Redistricted from the 11th district	Republican	1942	Incumbent retired. Republican loss.	▌ ✓ Thomas A. Jenkins (Republican) 64.0%; ▌Delmar A. Canaday (Democratic) 36.0%
Ohio 11	None (new district)			New seat. Republican gain.	▌ ✓ Oliver P. Bolton (Republican) 58.9%; ▌Robert J. Kilpatrick (Democratic) 41.1%
Ohio 12	John M. Vorys	Republican	1938	Incumbent re-elected.	▌ ✓ John M. Vorys (Republican) 62.3%; ▌George T. Tarbutton (Democratic) 37.7%
Ohio 13	Alvin F. Weichel	Republican	1942	Incumbent re-elected.	▌ ✓ Alvin F. Weichel (Republican) 58.8%; ▌George C. Steinemann (Democratic) 41.2%
Ohio 14	William H. Ayres	Republican	1950	Incumbent re-elected.	▌ ✓ William H. Ayres (Republican) 58.5%; ▌Walter B. Huber (Democratic) 41.5%
Ohio 15	Robert T. Secrest	Democratic	1948	Incumbent re-elected.	▌ ✓ Robert T. Secrest (Democratic) 64.3%; ▌P. W. Griffiths (Republican) 35.7%
Ohio 16	Frank T. Bow	Republican	1950	Incumbent re-elected.	▌ ✓ Frank T. Bow (Republican) 54.4%; ▌John McSweeney (Democratic) 45.6%
Ohio 17	J. Harry McGregor	Republican	1940	Incumbent re-elected.	▌ ✓ J. Harry McGregor (Republican) 68.2%; ▌James J. Mayer (Democratic) 31.8%
Ohio 18	Wayne L. Hays	Democratic	1948	Incumbent re-elected.	▌ ✓ Wayne L. Hays (Democratic) 55.8%; ▌Clarence J. Wetzel (Republican) 44.2%
Ohio 19	Michael J. Kirwan	Democratic	1936	Incumbent re-elected.	▌ ✓ Michael J. Kirwan (Democratic) 66.3%; ▌Allen Russell (Republican) 33.7%
Ohio 20	Michael A. Feighan	Democratic	1942	Incumbent re-elected.	▌ ✓ Michael A. Feighan (Democratic) 65.2%; ▌John H. Ferguson (Republican) 34.8%
Ohio 21	Robert Crosser	Democratic	1922	Incumbent re-elected.	▌ ✓ Robert Crosser (Democratic) 68.6%; ▌Lawrence O. Payne (Republican) 31.4%
Ohio 22	Frances P. Bolton	Republican	1940	Incumbent re-elected.	▌ ✓ Frances P. Bolton (Republican) 58.8%; ▌Chat Paterson (Democratic) 41.2%
Ohio 23	George H. Bender; Redistricted from the at-large district	Republican	1950	Incumbent re-elected.	▌ ✓ George H. Bender (Republican) 64.6%; ▌Michael P. O'Brien (Democratic) 35.4%

== Oklahoma ==
Oklahoma was reapportioned from 8 seats to 6 and eliminated the 7th and 8th districts, moving most of their territory into the 1st and 6th and expanding other districts to compensate.

District	Incumbent	Party	First elected	Result	Candidates
Oklahoma 1	Vacant			George B. Schwabe (R) died April 2, 1952. Republican loss.	▌ ✓ Page Belcher (Republican) 58.6%; ▌H. G. Dickey (Democratic) 41.4%
Oklahoma 1	Page Belcher; Redistricted from the 8th district	Republican	1950	Incumbent re-elected.	▌ ✓ Page Belcher (Republican) 58.6%; ▌H. G. Dickey (Democratic) 41.4%
Oklahoma 2	Vacant			William G. Stigler (D) died August 21, 1952; Democratic hold.	▌ ✓ Ed Edmondson (Democratic) 59.2%; ▌Edward E. Easton (Republican) 38.8%; Others: ▌Sample Eugene Brockman (Independent) 1.1%; ▌Jeff McHenry (Independent) 0.5%; ▌W. R. Kelton (Independent) 0.3%
Oklahoma 3	Carl Albert	Democratic	1946	Incumbent re-elected.	▌ ✓ Carl Albert (Democratic) 77.9%; ▌Frank D. McSherry (Republican) 22.1%
Oklahoma 4	Tom Steed	Democratic	1948	Incumbent re-elected.	▌ ✓ Tom Steed (Democratic) 58.7%; ▌John L. Goode (Republican) 40.7%; ▌L. D. Akin (Independent) 0.7%
Oklahoma 5	John Jarman	Democratic	1950	Incumbent re-elected.	▌ ✓ John Jarman (Democratic) 62.4%; ▌Edwin Whitney Burch (Republican) 37.6%
Oklahoma 6	Toby Morris	Democratic	1946	Incumbent lost renomination. Democratic loss.	▌ ✓ Victor Wickersham (Democratic) 63.3%; ▌K. B. Cornell (Republican) 36.7%
Oklahoma 6	Victor Wickersham; Redistricted from the 7th district	Democratic	1948	Incumbent re-elected.	▌ ✓ Victor Wickersham (Democratic) 63.3%; ▌K. B. Cornell (Republican) 36.7%

== Oregon ==
District	Incumbent	Party	First elected	Result	Candidates
Oregon 1	A. Walter Norblad	Republican	1946	Incumbent re-elected.	▌ ✓ A. Walter Norblad (Republican) 68.0%; ▌Robert B. Jones (Democratic) 32.0%
Oregon 2	Lowell Stockman	Republican	1942	Incumbent retired. Republican hold.	▌ ✓ Sam Coon (Republican) 58.5%; ▌John G. Jones (Democratic) 41.5%
Oregon 3	Homer D. Angell	Republican	1938	Incumbent re-elected.	▌ ✓ Homer D. Angell (Republican) 54.0%; ▌Alfred H. Corbett (Democratic) 46.0%
Oregon 4	Harris Ellsworth	Republican	1942	Incumbent re-elected.	▌ ✓ Harris Ellsworth (Republican) 66.3%; ▌Walter A. Swanson (Democratic) 33.7%

== Pennsylvania ==
Pennsylvania redistricted from 33 districts to 30, eliminating 1 district in northeastern Pennsylvania and 2 in southwestern Pennsylvania.

District	Incumbent	Party	First elected	Result	Candidates
Pennsylvania 1	William A. Barrett	Democratic	1944; 1946 (lost); 1948	Incumbent re-elected.	▌ ✓ William A. Barrett (Democratic) 68.2%; ▌James Iannucci (Republican) 31.8%
Pennsylvania 2	William T. Granahan	Democratic	1948	Incumbent re-elected.	▌ ✓ William T. Granahan (Democratic) 61.8%; ▌Daniel J. McCauley Jr. (Republican) 38.2%
Pennsylvania 3	Hardie Scott	Republican	1946	Incumbent retired. Democratic gain.	▌ ✓ James A. Byrne (Democratic) 58.4%; ▌Morton Witkin (Republican) 41.6%
Pennsylvania 4	Earl Chudoff	Democratic	1948	Incumbent re-elected.	▌ ✓ Earl Chudoff (Democratic) 69.9%; ▌Joseph R. Burns (Republican) 29.7%; ▌David P. Widamen (Progressive) 0.4%
Pennsylvania 5	William J. Green Jr.	Democratic	1948	Incumbent re-elected.	▌ ✓ William J. Green Jr. (Democratic) 54.2%; ▌Philip Richman (Republican) 45.8%
Pennsylvania 6	Hugh Scott	Republican	1946	Incumbent re-elected.	▌ ✓ Hugh Scott (Republican) 51.7%; ▌Harrington Herr (Democratic) 48.2%; ▌Anthony V. Lo Popolo (Independent) 0.1%
Pennsylvania 7	Benjamin F. James	Republican	1948	Incumbent re-elected.	▌ ✓ Benjamin F. James (Republican) 61.7%; ▌Murray P. Zealor (Democratic) 38.3%
Pennsylvania 8	Karl C. King	Republican	1951	Incumbent re-elected.	▌ ✓ Karl C. King (Republican) 59.3%; ▌Wilson H. Stephenson (Democratic) 40.7%
Pennsylvania 9	Paul B. Dague	Republican	1946	Incumbent re-elected.	▌ ✓ Paul B. Dague (Republican) 66.2%; ▌Philip E. Ragan (Democratic) 33.8%
Pennsylvania 10	Harry P. O'Neill	Democratic	1948	Incumbent lost re-election. Democratic loss.	▌ ✓ Joseph L. Carrigg (Republican) 53.6%; ▌Harry P. O'Neill (Democratic) 46.4%
Pennsylvania 10	Joseph L. Carrigg; Redistricted from the 14th district	Republican	1951	Incumbent re-elected.	▌ ✓ Joseph L. Carrigg (Republican) 53.6%; ▌Harry P. O'Neill (Democratic) 46.4%
Pennsylvania 11	Daniel Flood	Democratic	1944; 1946 (lost); 1948	Incumbent lost re-election. Republican gain.	▌ ✓ Edward Bonin (Republican) 50.2%; ▌Daniel Flood (Democratic) 49.8%
Pennsylvania 12	Ivor D. Fenton	Republican	1938	Incumbent re-elected.	▌ ✓ Ivor D. Fenton (Republican) 60.7%; ▌Peter Krehel (Democratic) 39.3%
Pennsylvania 13	Samuel K. McConnell Jr. Redistricted from the 16th district	Republican	1944	Incumbent re-elected.	▌ ✓ Samuel K. McConnell Jr. (Republican) 66.4%; ▌Frank A. Keegan (Democratic) 33.6%
Pennsylvania 14	George M. Rhodes; Redistricted from the 13th district	Democratic	1948	Incumbent re-elected.	▌ ✓ George M. Rhodes (Democratic) 49.7%; ▌James W. Bertolet (Republican) 49.2%; ▌Darlington Hoopes (Socialist) 1.1%
Pennsylvania 15	Francis E. Walter; Redistricted from the 20th district	Democratic	1932	Incumbent re-elected.	▌ ✓ Francis E. Walter (Democratic) 54.8%; ▌John Russell Craig (Republican) 45.2%
Pennsylvania 16	Walter M. Mumma; Redistricted from the 18th district	Republican	1950	Incumbent re-elected.	▌ ✓ Walter M. Mumma (Republican) 61.7%; ▌David V. Randall (Democratic) 38.3%
Pennsylvania 17	Alvin Bush; Redistricted from the 15th district	Republican	1950	Incumbent re-elected.	▌ ✓ Alvin Bush (Republican) 64.1%; ▌Patrick A. McGowan (Democratic) 34.7%; ▌Clyde A. Taylor (Prohibition) 1.2%
Pennsylvania 18	Richard M. Simpson; Redistricted from the 17th district	Republican	1937	Incumbent re-elected.	▌ ✓ Richard M. Simpson (Republican) 63.5%; ▌Philip R. Shoemaker (Democratic) 36.5%
Pennsylvania 19	James F. Lind; Redistricted from the 21st district	Democratic	1948	Incumbent lost re-election. Republican gain.	▌ ✓ S. Walter Stauffer (Republican) 52.3%; ▌James F. Lind (Democratic) 47.7%
Pennsylvania 20	James E. Van Zandt; Redistricted from the 22nd district	Republican	1946	Incumbent re-elected.	▌ ✓ James E. Van Zandt (Republican) 62.8%; ▌Joseph A. Moran (Democratic) 37.2%
Pennsylvania 21	Augustine B. Kelley; Redistricted from the 27th district	Democratic	1940	Incumbent re-elected.	▌ ✓ Augustine B. Kelley (Democratic) 52.9%; ▌J. Cleveland McKenna (Republican) 47.1%
Pennsylvania 22	John P. Saylor; Redistricted from the 26th district	Republican	1949	Incumbent re-elected.	▌ ✓ John P. Saylor (Republican) 52.4%; ▌William D. Shettig (Democratic) 47.6%
Pennsylvania 23	Leon H. Gavin; Redistricted from the 19th district	Republican	1942	Incumbent re-elected.	▌ ✓ Leon H. Gavin (Republican) 67.8%; ▌Fred C. Barr (Democratic) 32.2%
Pennsylvania 24	Carroll D. Kearns; Redistricted from the 28th district	Republican	1946	Incumbent re-elected.	▌ ✓ Carroll D. Kearns (Republican) 57.1%; ▌Clinton J. Bebell (Democratic) 42.9%
Pennsylvania 25	Louis E. Graham	Republican	1938	Incumbent re-elected.	▌ ✓ Louis E. Graham (Republican) 50.4%; ▌Frank M. Clark (Democratic) 49.6%
Pennsylvania 26	Thomas E. Morgan; Redistricted from the 24th district	Democratic	1944	Incumbent re-elected.	▌ ✓ Thomas E. Morgan (Democratic) 59.1%; ▌Edward L. Sittler Jr. (Republican) 40.9%
Pennsylvania 26	Edward L. Sittler Jr. Redistricted from the 23rd district	Republican	1950	Incumbent lost re-election. Republican loss.	▌ ✓ Thomas E. Morgan (Democratic) 59.1%; ▌Edward L. Sittler Jr. (Republican) 40.9%
Pennsylvania 27	James G. Fulton; Redistricted from the 31st district	Republican	1944	Incumbent re-elected.	▌ ✓ James G. Fulton (Republican) 62.6%; ▌Thomas J. O'Toole (Democratic) 37.4%
Pennsylvania 28	Herman P. Eberharter; Redistricted from the 32nd district	Democratic	1936	Incumbent re-elected.	▌ ✓ Herman P. Eberharter (Democratic) 58.7%; ▌Harmar D. Denny Jr. (Republican) 41.3%
Pennsylvania 28	Harmar D. Denny Jr. Redistricted from the 29th district	Republican	1950	Incumbent lost re-election. Republican loss.	▌ ✓ Herman P. Eberharter (Democratic) 58.7%; ▌Harmar D. Denny Jr. (Republican) 41.3%
Pennsylvania 29	Robert J. Corbett; Redistricted from the 30th district	Republican	1938; 1940 (lost); 1944	Incumbent re-elected.	▌ ✓ Robert J. Corbett (Republican) 61.7%; ▌Lee T. Sellars (Democratic) 38.3%
Pennsylvania 30	Vera Buchanan; Redistricted from the 33rd district	Democratic	1951	Incumbent re-elected.	▌ ✓ Vera Buchanan (Democratic) 63.6%; ▌Peter F. Bender (Republican) 36.4%

== Rhode Island ==
District	Incumbent	Party	First elected	Result	Candidates
Rhode Island 1	Aime Forand	Democratic	1940	Incumbent re-elected.	▌ ✓ Aime Forand (Democratic) 54.9%; ▌Berthelot A. Leclaire (Republican) 45.1%
Rhode Island 2	John E. Fogarty	Democratic	1940	Incumbent re-elected.	▌ ✓ John E. Fogarty (Democratic) 53.4%; ▌James O. Watts (Republican) 46.6%

== South Carolina ==
District	Incumbent	Party	First elected	Result	Candidates
South Carolina 1	L. Mendel Rivers	Democratic	1940	Incumbent re-elected.	▌ ✓ L. Mendel Rivers (Democratic); Uncontested
South Carolina 2	John J. Riley	Democratic	1950	Incumbent re-elected.	▌ ✓ John J. Riley (Democratic); Uncontested
South Carolina 3	William Jennings Bryan Dorn	Democratic	1946; 1948 (retired); 1950	Incumbent re-elected.	▌ ✓ William Jennings Bryan Dorn (Democratic) 93.9%; ▌David Dows (Republican) 6.1%
South Carolina 4	Joseph R. Bryson	Democratic	1938	Incumbent re-elected.	▌ ✓ Joseph R. Bryson (Democratic); Uncontested
South Carolina 5	James P. Richards	Democratic	1932	Incumbent re-elected.	▌ ✓ James P. Richards (Democratic) 93.9%; ▌Herbert L. Crosland (Republican) 6.1%
South Carolina 6	John L. McMillan	Democratic	1938	Incumbent re-elected.	▌ ✓ John L. McMillan (Democratic); Uncontested

== South Dakota ==
District	Incumbent	Party	First elected	Result	Candidates
South Dakota 1	Harold Lovre	Republican	1948	Incumbent re-elected.	▌ ✓ Harold Lovre (Republican) 68.5%; ▌Goldie Wells (Democratic) 31.5%
South Dakota 2	Ellis Yarnal Berry	Republican	1950	Incumbent re-elected.	▌ ✓ Ellis Yarnal Berry (Republican) 69.0%; ▌George A. Bangs (Democratic) 31.0%

== Tennessee ==
Tennessee lost one seat in reapportionment, and divided the old 4th district between the old 5th and 7th districts, with other minor boundary changes.

District	Incumbent	Party	First elected	Result	Candidates
Tennessee 1	B. Carroll Reece	Republican	1950	Incumbent re-elected.	▌ ✓ B. Carroll Reece (Republican) 65.9%; ▌Arthur W. Bright (Democratic) 34.1%
Tennessee 2	Howard Baker Sr.	Republican	1950	Incumbent re-elected.	▌ ✓ Howard Baker Sr. (Republican) 68.9%; ▌Boyd W. Cox (Democratic) 31.1%
Tennessee 3	James B. Frazier Jr.	Democratic	1948	Incumbent re-elected.	▌ ✓ James B. Frazier Jr. (Democratic) 70.0%; ▌Joseph M. Parker (Republican) 30.0%
Tennessee 4	Albert Gore Sr.	Democratic	1938	Incumbent retired to run for U.S. senator. Democratic loss.	▌ ✓ Joe L. Evins (Democratic); Uncontested
Tennessee 4	Joe L. Evins; Redistricted from the 5th district	Democratic	1946	Incumbent re-elected.	▌ ✓ Joe L. Evins (Democratic); Uncontested
Tennessee 5	Percy Priest; Redistricted from the 6th district	Democratic	1940	Incumbent re-elected.	▌ ✓ Percy Priest (Democratic) 67.5%; ▌Homer P. Wall (Republican) 32.5%
Tennessee 6	James Patrick Sutton; Redistricted from the 7th district	Democratic	1948	Incumbent re-elected.	▌ ✓ James Patrick Sutton (Democratic); Uncontested
Tennessee 7	Tom J. Murray; Redistricted from the 8th district	Democratic	1942	Incumbent re-elected.	▌ ✓ Tom J. Murray (Democratic); Uncontested
Tennessee 8	Jere Cooper; Redistricted from the 9th district	Democratic	1928	Incumbent re-elected.	▌ ✓ Jere Cooper (Democratic); Uncontested
Tennessee 9	Clifford Davis; Redistricted from the 10th district	Democratic	1940	Incumbent re-elected.	▌ ✓ Clifford Davis (Democratic) 85.7%; ▌William P. Chenault (Independent) 14.3%

== Texas ==
Texas gained one seat, adding it as an at-large district instead of redistricting.

District	Incumbent	Party	First elected	Result	Candidates
Texas 1	Wright Patman	Democratic	1928	Incumbent re-elected.	▌ ✓ Wright Patman (Democratic); Uncontested
Texas 2	Jesse M. Combs	Democratic	1944	Incumbent retired. Democratic hold.	▌ ✓ Jack Brooks (Democratic) 79.0%; ▌Randolph C. Reed (Republican) 21.0%
Texas 3	Lindley Beckworth	Democratic	1938	Incumbent retired to run for U.S. senator. Democratic hold.	▌ ✓ Brady P. Gentry (Democratic); Uncontested
Texas 4	Sam Rayburn	Democratic	1912	Incumbent re-elected.	▌ ✓ Sam Rayburn (Democratic); Uncontested
Texas 5	Joseph Franklin Wilson	Democratic	1946	Incumbent re-elected.	▌ ✓ Joseph Franklin Wilson (Democratic); Uncontested
Texas 6	Olin E. Teague	Democratic	1946	Incumbent re-elected.	▌ ✓ Olin E. Teague (Democratic); Uncontested
Texas 7	John Dowdy	Democratic	1952 (special)	Incumbent re-elected.	▌ ✓ John Dowdy (Democratic); Uncontested
Texas 8	Albert Thomas	Democratic	1936	Incumbent re-elected.	▌ ✓ Albert Thomas (Democratic); Uncontested
Texas 9	Clark W. Thompson	Democratic	1947	Incumbent re-elected.	▌ ✓ Clark W. Thompson (Democratic); Uncontested
Texas 10	Homer Thornberry	Democratic	1948	Incumbent re-elected.	▌ ✓ Homer Thornberry (Democratic); Uncontested
Texas 11	William R. Poage	Democratic	1936	Incumbent re-elected.	▌ ✓ William R. Poage (Democratic); Uncontested
Texas 12	Wingate H. Lucas	Democratic	1946	Incumbent re-elected.	▌ ✓ Wingate H. Lucas (Democratic); Uncontested
Texas 13	Frank N. Ikard	Democratic	1951	Incumbent re-elected.	▌ ✓ Frank N. Ikard (Democratic); Uncontested
Texas 14	John E. Lyle Jr.	Democratic	1944	Incumbent re-elected.	▌ ✓ John E. Lyle Jr. (Democratic); Uncontested
Texas 15	Lloyd Bentsen	Democratic	1948	Incumbent re-elected.	▌ ✓ Lloyd Bentsen (Democratic); Uncontested
Texas 16	Kenneth M. Regan	Democratic	1947	Incumbent re-elected.	▌ ✓ Kenneth M. Regan (Democratic); Uncontested
Texas 17	Omar Burleson	Democratic	1946	Incumbent re-elected.	▌ ✓ Omar Burleson (Democratic); Uncontested
Texas 18	Walter E. Rogers	Democratic	1950	Incumbent re-elected.	▌ ✓ Walter E. Rogers (Democratic); Uncontested
Texas 19	George H. Mahon	Democratic	1934	Incumbent re-elected.	▌ ✓ George H. Mahon (Democratic); Uncontested
Texas 20	Paul J. Kilday	Democratic	1938	Incumbent re-elected.	▌ ✓ Paul J. Kilday (Democratic); Uncontested
Texas 21	O. C. Fisher	Democratic	1942	Incumbent re-elected.	▌ ✓ O. C. Fisher (Democratic); Uncontested
Texas at-large	None (new district)			New seat. Democratic gain.	▌ ✓ Martin Dies Jr. (Democratic); Uncontested

== Utah ==
District	Incumbent	Party	First elected	Result	Candidates
Utah 1	Walter K. Granger	Democratic	1940	Incumbent retired to run for U.S. senator. Republican gain.	▌ ✓ Douglas R. Stringfellow (Republican) 60.5%; ▌Ernest R. McKay (Democratic) 39.5%
Utah 2	Reva Beck Bosone	Democratic	1948	Incumbent lost re-election. Republican gain.	▌ ✓ William A. Dawson (Republican) 52.5%; ▌Reva Beck Bosone (Democratic) 47.5%

== Vermont ==
District	Incumbent	Party	First elected	Result	Candidates
Vermont at-large	Winston L. Prouty	Republican	1950	Incumbent re-elected.	▌ ✓ Winston L. Prouty (Republican) 71.8%; ▌Herbert B. Comings (Democratic) 28.2%

== Virginia ==
Virginia gained one seat, adding a new district in the DC suburbs and making boundary adjustments elsewhere.

District	Incumbent	Party	First elected	Result	Candidates
Virginia 1	Edward J. Robeson Jr.	Democratic	1950	Incumbent re-elected.	▌ ✓ Edward J. Robeson Jr. (Democratic); Uncontested
Virginia 2	Porter Hardy Jr.	Democratic	1946	Incumbent re-elected.	▌ ✓ Porter Hardy Jr. (Democratic); Uncontested
Virginia 3	J. Vaughan Gary	Democratic	1945	Incumbent re-elected.	▌ ✓ J. Vaughan Gary (Democratic) 57.7%; ▌Walter R. Gambill (Republican) 42.3%
Virginia 4	Watkins Abbitt	Democratic	1948	Incumbent re-elected.	▌ ✓ Watkins Abbitt (Democratic); Uncontested
Virginia 5	Thomas B. Stanley	Democratic	1946	Incumbent re-elected.	▌ ✓ Thomas B. Stanley (Democratic); Uncontested
Virginia 6	Clarence G. Burton	Democratic	1948	Incumbent lost re-election. Republican gain.	▌ ✓ Richard Harding Poff (Republican) 51.5%; ▌Clarence G. Burton (Democratic) 48.5%
Virginia 7	Burr Harrison	Democratic	1946	Incumbent re-elected.	▌ ✓ Burr Harrison (Democratic) 79.1%; ▌Glenn W. Ruebush (Republican) 20.9%
Virginia 8	Howard W. Smith	Democratic	1930	Incumbent re-elected.	▌ ✓ Howard W. Smith (Democratic) 75.8%; ▌Homer G. Richey (Independent) 24.2%
Virginia 9	Thomas B. Fugate	Democratic	1948	Incumbent retired. Republican gain.	▌ ✓ William C. Wampler (Republican) 51.7%; ▌M. M. Long (Democratic) 48.3%
Virginia 10	None (new district)			New seat. Republican gain.	▌ ✓ Joel Broyhill (Republican) 50.2%; ▌Edmund D. Campbell (Democratic) 49.8%

== Washington ==
Washington gained one seat at reapportionment, adding it as an at-large district instead of redistricting.

District	Incumbent	Party	First elected	Result	Candidates
Washington 1	Hugh B. Mitchell	Democratic	1948	Incumbent retired to run for Governor of Washington. Republican gain.	▌ ✓ Thomas Pelly (Republican) 51.4%; ▌Stimson Bullitt (Democratic) 48.3%; ▌James A. McDaniel (Progressive) 0.3%
Washington 2	Henry M. Jackson	Democratic	1940	Incumbent retired to run for U.S. senator. Republican gain.	▌ ✓ Jack Westland (Republican) 54.2%; ▌Harry F. Henson (Democratic) 45.6%; ▌Elgar Houghton (Progressive) 0.2%
Washington 3	Russell V. Mack	Republican	1947	Incumbent re-elected.	▌ ✓ Russell V. Mack (Republican) 53.3%; ▌Gordon M. Quarnstrom (Democratic) 46.6%; ▌Robert Dokter (Progressive) 0.1%
Washington 4	Hal Holmes	Republican	1942	Incumbent re-elected.	▌ ✓ Hal Holmes (Republican) 67.5%; ▌William Bryan (Democratic) 32.5%
Washington 5	Walt Horan	Republican	1942	Incumbent re-elected.	▌ ✓ Walt Horan (Republican) 56.0%; ▌Robert Dellwo (Democratic) 44.0%
Washington 6	Thor C. Tollefson	Republican	1946	Incumbent re-elected.	▌ ✓ Thor C. Tollefson (Republican) 59.8%; ▌John J. O'Connell (Democratic) 40.2%
Washington at-large	None (new district)			New seat. Democratic gain.	▌ ✓ Donald H. Magnuson (Democratic) 50.5%; ▌Al Canwell (Republican) 49.5%; ▌Elmer R. Moork (Labor) 0.05%

== West Virginia ==
District	Incumbent	Party	First elected	Result	Candidates
West Virginia 1	Robert L. Ramsay	Democratic	1948	Incumbent lost renomination. Democratic hold.	▌ ✓ Bob Mollohan (Democratic) 52.9%; ▌Francis J. Love (Republican) 47.1%
West Virginia 2	Harley O. Staggers	Democratic	1948	Incumbent re-elected.	▌ ✓ Harley O. Staggers (Democratic) 51.5%; ▌Kermit R. Mason (Republican) 48.5%
West Virginia 3	Cleveland M. Bailey	Democratic	1948	Incumbent re-elected.	▌ ✓ Cleveland M. Bailey (Democratic) 53.4%; ▌Frank Love (Republican) 46.6%
West Virginia 4	Maurice G. Burnside	Democratic	1948	Incumbent lost re-election. Republican gain.	▌ ✓ Will E. Neal (Republican) 53.3%; ▌Maurice G. Burnside (Democratic) 46.7%
West Virginia 5	Elizabeth Kee	Democratic	1951 (special)	Incumbent re-elected.	▌ ✓ Elizabeth Kee (Democratic) 63.8%; ▌Cyrus H. Gadd (Republican) 36.2%
West Virginia 6	E. H. Hedrick	Democratic	1944	Incumbent retired to run for Governor of West Virginia. Democratic hold.	▌ ✓ Robert Byrd (Democratic) 55.6%; ▌Latelle M. LaFollette Jr. (Republican) 44.4%

== Wisconsin ==
District	Incumbent	Party	First elected	Result	Candidates
Wisconsin 1	Lawrence H. Smith	Republican	1941	Incumbent re-elected.	▌ ✓ Lawrence H. Smith (Republican) 59.4%; ▌Arnie W. Agnew (Democratic) 40.6%
Wisconsin 2	Glenn Robert Davis	Republican	1947	Incumbent re-elected.	▌ ✓ Glenn Robert Davis (Republican) 62.9%; ▌Horace W. Wilkie (Democratic) 37.1%
Wisconsin 3	Gardner R. Withrow	Republican	1948	Incumbent re-elected.	▌ ✓ Gardner R. Withrow (Republican) 75.1%; ▌Edna Brown (Democratic) 24.9%
Wisconsin 4	Clement J. Zablocki	Democratic	1948	Incumbent re-elected.	▌ ✓ Clement J. Zablocki (Democratic) 64.3%; ▌John C. Schafer (Republican) 35.7%
Wisconsin 5	Charles J. Kersten	Republican	1950	Incumbent re-elected.	▌ ✓ Charles J. Kersten (Republican) 51.6%; ▌Andrew Biemiller (Democratic) 48.4%
Wisconsin 6	William Van Pelt	Republican	1950	Incumbent re-elected.	▌ ✓ William Van Pelt (Republican) 71.7%; ▌Ralph A. Norem (Democratic) 28.3%
Wisconsin 7	Vacant			Reid F. Murray (R) died April 29, 1952. Republican hold.	▌ ✓ Melvin Laird (Republican) 72.3%; ▌Ernest Kluck (Democratic) 27.7%
Wisconsin 8	John W. Byrnes	Republican	1944	Incumbent re-elected.	▌ ✓ John W. Byrnes (Republican) 73.6%; ▌Robert C. Schultz (Democratic) 26.4%
Wisconsin 9	Merlin Hull	Republican	1934	Incumbent re-elected.	▌ ✓ Merlin Hull (Republican) 65.2%; ▌Kent L. Pillsbury (Democratic) 34.8%
Wisconsin 10	Alvin E. O'Konski	Republican	1942	Incumbent re-elected.	▌ ✓ Alvin O'Konski (Republican) 67.4%; ▌Roland E. Kannenberg (Democratic) 32.6%

== Wyoming ==
District	Incumbent	Party	First elected	Result	Candidates
Wyoming at-large	William Henry Harrison III	Republican	1950	Incumbent re-elected.	▌ ✓ William Henry Harrison III (Republican) 60.1%; ▌Robert R. Rose Jr. (Democratic) 39.9%

== Non-voting delegates ==
=== Alaska Territory ===
District	Incumbent			This race	
District	Representative	Party	First elected	Results	Candidates
Alaska Territory at-large	Bob Bartlett	Democratic	1944	Incumbent re-elected.	▌ ✓ Bob Bartlett (Democratic) 56.62%; ▌Robert C. Reeve (Republican) 43.38%

=== Hawaii Territory ===
District	Incumbent			This race	
District	Representative	Party	First elected	Results	Candidates
Hawaii Territory at-large	Joseph Farrington	Republican	1942	Incumbent re-elected.	▌ ✓ Joseph Farrington (Republican) 53.68%; ▌Delbert Metzger (Democratic) 46.32%

== See also ==
- 1952 United States elections
  - 1952 United States Senate elections
  - 1952 United States presidential election
- 82nd United States Congress
- 83rd United States Congress
