= Tauriello =

Tauriello is a surname. Notable people with the surname include:

- Anthony F. Tauriello (1899–1983), American politician and attorney
- Dena Tauriello, drummer
- Joseph A. Tauriello (1934–2009), politician
- Pete Tauriello, traffic reporter
