= Charles Mann Hamilton =

American politician

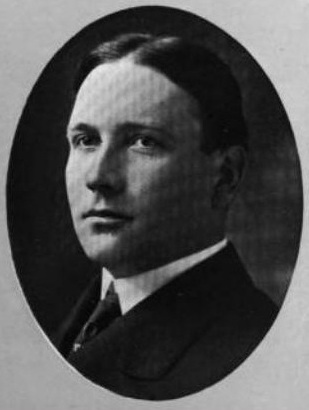

Member of the U.S. House of Representatives from New York's 43rd district
- In office March 4, 1913 – March 3, 1919
- Preceded by: District created
- Succeeded by: Daniel A. Reed

Personal details
- Born: January 23, 1874 Ripley, New York, US
- Died: January 3, 1942 (aged 67) Miami Beach, Florida, US
- Party: Republican

Charles Mann Hamilton (January 23, 1874 – January 3, 1942) was an American politician from New York.

== Life ==
Hamilton attended Ripley High School, the Fredonia Normal School (now the State University of New York at Fredonia), and the Pennsylvania Military College (now Widener University) in Chester, Pennsylvania. He was active in farming, and was also involved in the oil and natural gas business.

A Republican, he was a member of the New York State Assembly (Chautauqua Co., 2nd D.) in 1907 and 1908.

He was a member of the New York State Senate (51st D.) from 1909 to 1912, sitting in the 132nd, 133rd, 134th and 135th New York State Legislatures.

Hamilton was elected as a Republican to the 63rd, 64th and 65th United States Congresses, holding office from March 4, 1913, to March 3, 1919; and was Minority Whip from 1915 to 1919.

He was not a candidate for reelection in 1918, and returned to his farming and business interests.

Hamilton died in Miami Beach, Florida on January 3, 1942. He was buried at Quincy Rural Cemetery in Ripley.

== Sources ==
- United States Congress. "Charles Mann Hamilton (id: H000104)". Biographical Directory of the United States Congress.

New York State Assembly
Preceded by Henry K. Williams	New York State Assembly; Chautauqua County, 2nd District; 1907–1908	Succeeded by John Leo Sullivan
New York State Senate
Preceded by Albert T. Fancher	New York State Senate; 51st District; 1909–1912	Succeeded by Frank N. Godfrey
U.S. House of Representatives
Preceded by new district	Member of the U.S. House of Representatives from New York's 43rd congressional district 1913–1919	Succeeded by Daniel A. Reed
