= Stanley J. Bauer =

American politician (1913–1972)

Stanley J. Bauer (May 3, 1913 – October 1972) was an American union official and Republican politician from New York.

== Life ==
He was born on May 3, 1913, in Buffalo, New York. He was business agent for Local 36 of the American Federation of Grain Millers.

Bauer was a member of the New York State Senate from 1951 to 1958, sitting in the 168th, 169th, 170th and 171st New York State Legislatures. He was also a delegate to the 1952 Republican National Convention and an alternate delegate to the 1956 Republican National Convention.

In February 1961, he was indicted by a federal grand jury on four counts of income tax evasion. In June 1962, he pleaded guilty on one count and was fined $5,000. In November 1962, he ran again for the State Senate but was defeated by the incumbent Democrat Frank J. Glinski.

In 1965, he was arrested for having attempted to "fix" an extortion case in the Erie County Court for $2,000.

In June 1968, he was convicted of grand larceny and conspiracy and sentenced to one year in the Erie County Jail, and two and a half to five years in Attica Correctional Facility. He served 19 months in Attica before he was paroled out of jail in January 1972. He was found dead on October 5, 1972, in his room at the Touraine Hotel in Buffalo, New York, having been dead for several days.

== Sources ==
New York State Senate
Preceded by Edmund P. Radwan	New York State Senate; 54th District; 1951–1954	Succeeded by Earl W. Brydges
Preceded by George H. Pierce	New York State Senate; 56th District; 1955–1958	Succeeded by Frank J. Glinski
