= Edward J. Elsaesser =

American politician

Edward Julius Elsaesser
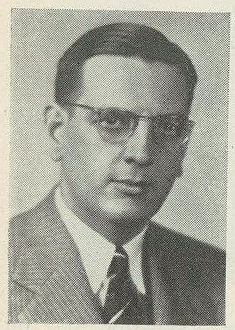

Member of the U.S. House of Representatives from New York's 43rd district
- In office January 3, 1945 – January 3, 1949
- Preceded by: Daniel A. Reed
- Succeeded by: Anthony F. Tauriello

Personal details
- Born: March 10, 1904 Buffalo, New York, U.S.
- Died: January 7, 1983 (aged 78) Williamsville, New York, U.S.
- Citizenship: United States
- Party: Republican
- Spouse: Anna Hossack Elsaesser
- Education: University at Buffalo Law School
- Profession: Attorney

Edward Julius Elsaesser (March 10, 1904 – January 7, 1983) was an American politician and a U.S. representative for the 43rd district of the state of New York.

== Biography ==
Elsaesser was born in Buffalo, New York, on March 10, 1904, the son of John and Ida (Steinke) Elsaesser, and graduated from the University at Buffalo Law School in 1926. He was admitted to the bar in 1927 and practiced in Buffalo. He married Anna Hossack on December 6, 1933.

== Career ==
Elsaesser was a Republican candidate for the New York State Assembly from Erie County's 3rd District in 1936. He was a Republican State committeeman from 1937 to 1945, and a Delegate to the 1940 Republican National Convention.

Elected to the House of Representatives as a Republican in 1944 and reelected in 1946, Elsaesser served from January 3, 1945, to January 3, 1949. He was an unsuccessful candidate for reelection in 1948, and for his Congressional district's Republican nomination in 1950. After leaving Congress, Elsaesser continued to practice law.

== Death ==
Elsaesser died in Williamsville, New York, on January 7, 1983 (age 78 years, 303 days). He is interred at Williamsville Cemetery, Williamsville, New York.

U.S. House of Representatives
Preceded by Daniel A. Reed	Member of the U.S. House of Representatives from New York's 43rd congressional district 1945–1949	Succeeded by Anthony F. Tauriello
