= New York's 43rd congressional district =

Former congressional district

Coordinates: 42°15′N 78°40′W

- Obsolete district
- Created: 1910
- Eliminated: 1960
- Years active: 1913–1963

The 43rd congressional district of New York was a congressional district for the United States House of Representatives in New York. It was created in 1913 as a result of the 1910 census. It was eliminated in 1963 as a result of the 1960 census. It was last represented by Charles E. Goodell who was redistricted into the 38th district.

== List of members representing the district ==
Representative	Party	Years	Cong ress	Electoral history	District location (counties)
District established March 4, 1913
Charles Mann Hamilton (Ripley)	Republican	March 4, 1913 – March 3, 1919	63rd 64th 65th	Elected in 1912. Re-elected in 1914. Re-elected in 1916. Retired.	1913–1945: All of Allegany, Cattaraugus, Chautauqua
Daniel A. Reed (Dunkirk)	Republican	March 4, 1919 – January 3, 1945	66th 67th 68th 69th 70th 71st 72nd 73rd 74th 75th 76th 77th 78th	Elected in 1918. Re-elected in 1920. Re-elected in 1922. Re-elected in 1924. Re-elected in 1926. Re-elected in 1928. Re-elected in 1930. Re-elected in 1932. Re-elected in 1934. Re-elected in 1936. Re-elected in 1938. Re-elected in 1940. Re-elected in 1942. Redistricted to the 45th district.	1913–1945: All of Allegany, Cattaraugus, Chautauqua
Edward J. Elsaesser (Buffalo)	Republican	January 3, 1945 – January 3, 1949	79th 80th	Elected in 1944. Re-elected in 1946. Lost re-election.	1945–1953: Parts of Erie
Anthony F. Tauriello (Buffalo)	Democratic	January 3, 1949 – January 3, 1951	81st	Elected in 1948. Lost re-election.	1945–1953: Parts of Erie
Edmund P. Radwan (Buffalo)	Republican	January 3, 1951 – January 3, 1953	82nd	Elected in 1950. Redistricted to the 41st district.	1945–1953: Parts of Erie
Daniel A. Reed (Dunkirk)	Republican	January 3, 1953 – February 19, 1959	83rd 84th 85th 86th	Redistricted from the 45th district. Re-elected in 1952. Re-elected in 1954. Re-elected in 1956. Re-elected in 1958. Died.	1953–1963: All of Allegany, Cattaraugus, Chautauqua, Livingston
Vacant		February 20, 1959 – May 25, 1959	86th		1953–1963: All of Allegany, Cattaraugus, Chautauqua, Livingston
Charles E. Goodell (Jamestown)	Republican	May 26, 1959 – January 3, 1963	86th 87th	Elected to finish Reed's term. Re-elected in 1960. Redistricted to the 38th district.	1953–1963: All of Allegany, Cattaraugus, Chautauqua, Livingston
District dissolved January 3, 1963

== Election results ==
Year	Democratic	Republican	Other
1920	Fred H. Sylvester: 13,720	✓ Daniel A. Reed (Incumbent): 52,343	Gust B. Peterson (Socialist): 4,273
1922	Frederick Garfield: 15,261	✓ Daniel A. Reed (Incumbent): 40,374	Conrad Axelsohn (Socialist): 1,265; J. William Sanbury (Farmer-Labor): 356
1924	—	✓ Daniel A. Reed (Incumbent): 61,769	J. Samuel Fowler (Progressive): 6,141
1926	John B. Leach: 15,555	✓ Daniel A. Reed (Incumbent): 44,073	—
1928	Arthur E. Towne: 23,176	✓ Daniel A. Reed (Incumbent): 73,571	—
1930	Mattie C. Dellone: 14,755	✓ Daniel A. Reed (Incumbent): 38,913	Herman Guntner (Socialist): 1,429
1932	Gerald A. Herrick: 34,561	✓ Daniel A. Reed (Incumbent): 55,988	John C. Cooper (Socialist): 2,690
1934	Peter B. Hogan: 22,856	✓ Daniel A. Reed (Incumbent): 42,513	Fred J. Smith (Socialist): 2,556; Howard Albro (Communist): 206
1936	Clare Barnes: 44,585	✓ Daniel A. Reed (Incumbent): 56,129	Joseph J. O'Brocta (Socialist): 1,336; Axel W. Berggren (Communist): 172
1938	Samuel A. Carlson: 28,289	✓ Daniel A. Reed (Incumbent): 53,261	—
1940	Milton A. Bissell: 40,980	✓ Daniel A. Reed (Incumbent): 67,520	—
1942	Clare Barnes: 20,867	✓ Daniel A. Reed (Incumbent): 43,730	Nelson M. Fuller (American Labor): 3,466
1944	Raymond J. Barnes: 71,216	✓ Edward J. Elsaesser: 74,366	—
1946	Charles P. McCabe: 38,108	✓ Edward J. Elsaesser (Incumbent): 71,758	George J. Young (American Labor): 4,853
1948	✓ Anthony F. Tauriello: 72,388	Edward J. Elsaesser (Incumbent): 66,729	George Provost (American Labor): 3,322
1950	Anthony F. Tauriello (Incumbent): 58,327	✓ Edmund P. Radwan: 61,781	Michael Clune (American Labor): 1,421
1952	Harry D. Johnson: 44,276	✓ Daniel A. Reed (Incumbent): 91,534	Lyle H. Furlong (Liberal): 2,231; Axel W. Berggren (American Labor): 285
1954	James F. Crowley: 34,590	✓ Daniel A. Reed (Incumbent): 66,852	John G. Cooper (Liberal): 1,664; Nahum E. Aldrich (American Labor): 69
1956	T. Joseph Lynch: 42,476	✓ Daniel A. Reed (Incumbent): 93,079	—
1958	T. Joseph Lynch: 36,799	✓ Daniel A. Reed (Incumbent): 68,896	Leo M. Brushingham (Liberal): 2,328
1960	T. Joseph Lynch: 48,423	✓ Charles E. Goodell (Incumbent): 87,585	Elmer Olson (Liberal): 3,553
