= Frank J. Glinski =

American politician

Frank Joseph Glinski (September 1, 1909 – March 6, 1983) was an American politician from New York.

== Life ==
He was born on September 1, 1909, in Buffalo, New York. He attended the public schools, Masten Park High School, and Weaver School of Business and Real Estate. Then he became a salesman, and later a public relations consultant.

He was a member of the Board of Supervisors of Erie County from 1937 to 1943. He resigned his seat, enlisted in the U.S. Army, and fought in the European theater of World War II.

He was a Councilman-at-large of the Buffalo Common Council from 1950 to 1953; and again in 1958. In the latter year he was elected president pro tempore of the Common Council. He resigned his seat after his election to the State Senate.

Glinski was a member of the New York State Senate from 1959 to 1973, sitting in the 172nd, 173rd, 174th, 175th, 176th, 177th, 178th, 179th and 180th New York State Legislatures. He was a delegate to the 1964 Democratic National Convention. He resigned his seat in 1973.

He died on March 6, 1983; and was buried at the Mount Calvary Cemetery in Cheektowaga.

== Sources ==
New York State Senate
Preceded by Stanley J. Bauer	New York State Senate; 56th District; 1959–1965	Succeeded by William T. Smith
Preceded by new district	New York State Senate; 63rd District; 1966	Succeeded by district abolished
Preceded by Warren M. Anderson	New York State Senate; 55th District; 1967–1973	Succeeded by Joseph A. Tauriello
