= Daniel A. Reed (politician) =

American football player, coach, and politician (1875–1959)

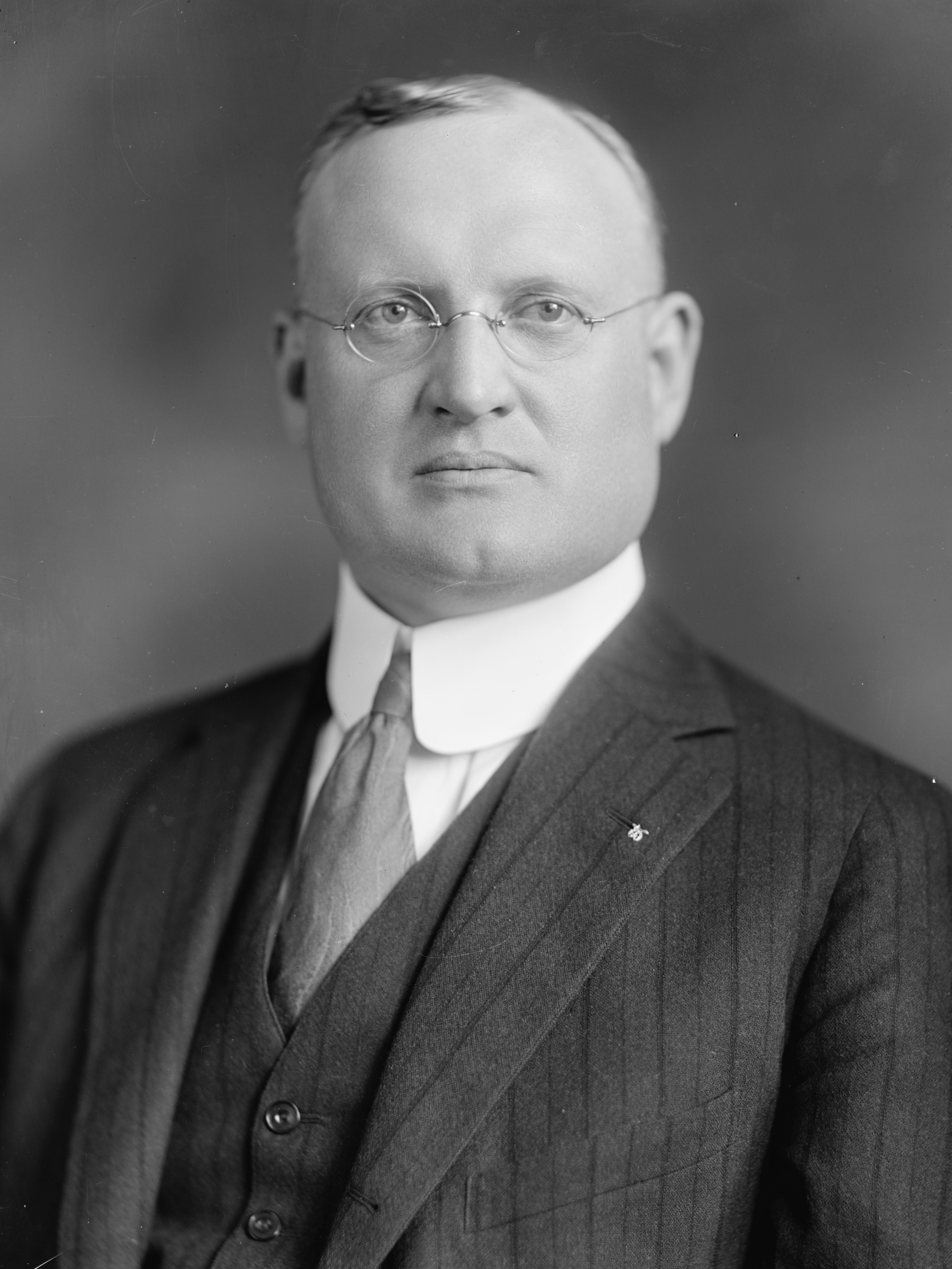
- Reed, 1905–1945

Member of the U.S. House of Representatives from New York
- In office March 4, 1919 – February 19, 1959
- Preceded by: Charles Mann Hamilton
- Succeeded by: Charles Goodell
- Constituency: 43rd district (1919–45); 45th district (1945–53); 43rd district (1953–59)

Personal details
- Born: Daniel Alden Reed; September 15, 1875 Sheridan, New York, U.S.
- Died: February 19, 1959 (aged 83) Washington, D.C., U.S.
- Party: Republican
- Education: Cornell University (LLB)

Daniel Alden Reed (September 15, 1875 – February 19, 1959) was an American college football player, coach, and U.S. representative from the state of New York. Reed was attorney for the excise department of New York from 1903 to 1909. He served in the House of Representatives as a Republican from 1919 until his death in Washington, D.C., on February 19, 1959. He is the only person to have represented New York's 45th congressional district throughout the entirety of its existence. He previously represented the 43rd district before the 45th's creation, and subsequently represented it again upon its dissolution.

== Professional career ==
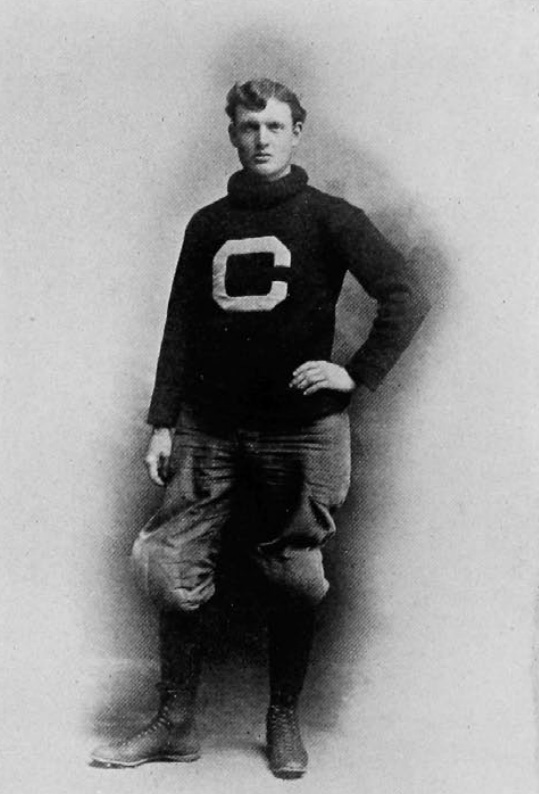
Reed pictured in The Cincinnatian 1900, Cincinnati yearbook

Reed was born in Sheridan, New York on September 15, 1875. He attended the public schools of Sheridan and Silver Creek, New York, and graduated from Cornell University in 1898, where he was a member of the Delta Chi fraternity and the Quill and Dagger society. Reed studied law, was admitted to the bar in 1900, and practiced first in Silver Creek, and later in Dunkirk, New York. Reed was also a board of directors member for the Dunkirk Trust Company, and became a popular speech maker on business and civic topics.

He was an attorney for the New York State Excise Department from 1903 to 1909. During World War I he was one of the commissioners sent to France by the federal government to study the ongoing food shortage in preparation for a U.S. lecture tour on the importance of food conservation.

== Coaching career ==
After playing football at Cornell University, Reed coached at the University of Cincinnati, Pennsylvania State University, and his alma mater. From 1899 to 1900 he coached at Cincinnati, and guided the Bearcats to an 8–6–1 record. He coached at Penn State in 1903, compiling a 5–3 record. From 1910 to 1911, he was the head coach at Cornell, where he led that team to a 12–5–1 record. His career record is 25–14–2.

=== Head coaching record ===
Year	Team	Overall	Conference	Standing	Bowl/playoffs
Cincinnati (Independent) (1899–1900)
1899	Cincinnati	5–2			
1900	Cincinnati	3–5–1			
Cincinnati:		8–7–1			
Penn State (Independent) (1903)
1903	Penn State	5–3			
Penn State:		5–3			
Cornell Big Red (Independent) (1910–1911)
1910	Cornell	5–2–1			
1911	Cornell	7–3			
Cornell:		12–5–1			
Total:		25–15–2			

== Congressional career ==
In 1918 Reed was elected to Congress as a Republican. He was reelected 20 times, and served from March 4, 1919 until his death. During his time in the U.S. House Reed was chairman of the Committee on Industrial Arts and Expositions (Sixty-eighth Congress); the Committee on Education (Sixty-ninth through Seventy-first Congresses); the Committee on Ways and Means (Eighty-third Congress); and the Joint Committee on Internal Revenue Taxation (Eighty-third Congress).

Reed was a delegate to the Interparliamentary Union meeting in Rome in 1948. He later served as a delegate at meetings in Sweden, Switzerland, and France.

During his years in Congress, Reed was one of the most conservative members of the New York delegation, frequently scoring zeros from Americans for Democratic Action, and was one of the few isolationists remaining in the New York delegation after World War II.

Reed was also one of the few Republicans to consistently oppose banning the poll tax through legislative means, although he did vote in favor of anti-lynching legislation and the Civil Rights Act of 1957.

== Death and legacy ==
Reed died from a major heart attack in Washington, D.C. on February 19, 1959. He was buried at Sheridan Cemetery in Sheridan, New York.

The library at the State University of New York at Fredonia was named for him.

== See also ==
- List of members of the United States Congress who died in office (1950–1999)

U.S. House of Representatives
Preceded by Charles Mann Hamilton	Member of the U.S. House of Representatives from New York's 43rd congressional district 1919–1945	Succeeded by Edward J. Elsaesser
Preceded by District 45 created in 1945	Member of the U.S. House of Representatives from New York's 45th congressional district 1945–1953	Succeeded by District 45 eliminated after the 1950 Census
Preceded by Edmund P. Radwan	Member of the U.S. House of Representatives from New York's 43rd congressional district 1953–1959	Succeeded by Charles Goodell
