= Louis F. Capuzi =

American politician

Louis F. Capuzi (November 6, 1920 – December 24, 1980) was an American politician of the Republican Party.

Born in Chicago, Illinois, Capuzi went to Chicago public schools and Steinmetz High School. He served in the United States Army during World War II. Capuzi attended the Northwestern Institute of Foot Surgery and Chiropody.

He served in the Illinois House of Representatives from 1955 to 1965, then from 1965 to 1977, and finally from 1979 until his death while still in office.

In 1976, Capuzi was convicted in the United States District Court for accepting a bribe involving the ready-mixed concrete business. However, United States District Court judge George N. Leighton overturned the guilty verdict due to lack of evidence.

Capuzi died at St. Mary of Nazareth Hospital in Chicago, Illinois after suffering a heart attack at his home.
