= Edmund P. Radwan =

American politician (1911–1959)

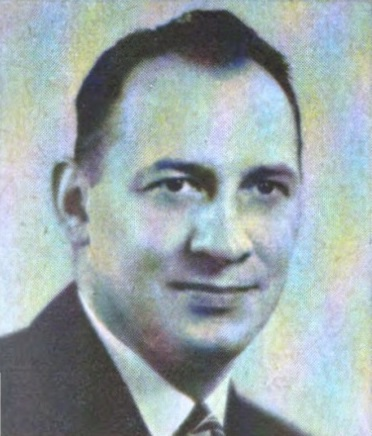
- Radwan in 1955

Member of the U.S. House of Representatives from New York
- In office January 3, 1951 – January 3, 1959
- Preceded by: Anthony F. Tauriello
- Succeeded by: Thaddeus J. Dulski
- Constituency: 43rd district (1951–1953); 41st district (1953–1959)

Member of the New York State Senate from the 54th district
- In office January 1, 1946 – December 31, 1950
- Preceded by: Stephen J. Wojtkowiak
- Succeeded by: Stanley J. Bauer

Personal details
- Born: September 22, 1911 Buffalo, New York, U.S.
- Died: September 7, 1959 (aged 47) Buffalo, New York, U.S.
- Party: Republican

Edmund Patrick Radwan (September 22, 1911 – September 7, 1959) was an American politician from New York.

== Life ==
He was born on September 22, 1911, in Buffalo, New York, of Polish descent. He attended the public schools, and graduated from University of Buffalo Law School in 1934. Radwan was an athletics coach at East High School in Buffalo from 1929 to 1934.

He was admitted to the bar in 1935, and practiced law in Buffalo. He was Attorney of the Village of Sloan from 1938 to 1940. During World War II he served as a corporal in the United States Army from 1943 to 1945.

Radwan was a member of the New York State Senate (54th D.) from 1946 to 1950, sitting in the 165th, 166th and 167th New York State Legislatures.

He was elected as a Republican to the 82nd, 83rd, 84th and 85th United States Congresses, holding office from January 3, 1951, to January 3, 1959. Radwan voted in favor of the Civil Rights Act of 1957.

He died on September 7, 1959, in Buffalo, New York; and was buried at the St. Stanislaus Cemetery there.

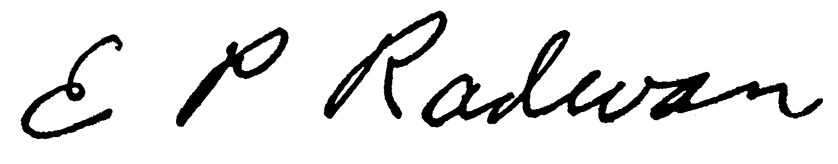
Radwan's signature

New York State Senate
Preceded by Stephen J. Wojtkowiak	New York State Senate; 54th District; 1946–1950	Succeeded by Stanley J. Bauer
U.S. House of Representatives
Preceded by Anthony F. Tauriello	Member of the U.S. House of Representatives from New York's 43rd congressional district 1951–1953	Succeeded by Daniel A. Reed
Preceded by Harold C. Ostertag	Member of the U.S. House of Representatives from New York's 41st congressional district 1953–1959	Succeeded by Thaddeus J. Dulski
