= Joseph A. Tauriello =

American politician

Joseph Tauriello

Member of the New York Senate from the 55th district
- In office 1974–1980
- Preceded by: Frank J. Glinski
- Succeeded by: Anthony M. Masiello

Personal details
- Born: April 3, 1934 Buffalo, New York, U.S.
- Died: November 17, 2009 (aged 75) Cheektowaga, New York, U.S.
- Party: Democratic
- Relations: Anthony F. Tauriello (uncle)
- Education: University at Buffalo

Joseph A. Tauriello (April 3, 1934 – November 17, 2009) was an American politician who served as a member of the New York State Senate.

== Early life and education ==
Tauriello was born on April 3, 1934, in Buffalo, New York, the son of Frank J. Tauriello and Margaret L. Tauriello. His uncle, Anthony F. Tauriello, served for one term in the United States House of Representatives. He attended Grover Cleveland High School and the University at Buffalo.

== Career ==
In 1958, he joined the Buffalo Fire Department and became an arson investigator.

He entered politics as a Democrat. He was a member of the Board of Supervisors of Erie County in 1966 and 1967; and a member of the Erie County Legislature from 1968 to 1973.

He was a member of the New York State Senate from 1974 to 1980, sitting in the 180th, 181st, 182nd and 183rd New York State Legislatures. In 1980, he was appointed to the New York State Workers' Compensation Board.

== Death ==
He died on November 17, 2009, at in Elderwood Senior Care in Cheektowaga, New York. He was buried at the Mount Calvary Cemetery there.

New York State Senate
Preceded by Frank J. Glinski	New York State Senate; 55th District; 1974–1980	Succeeded by Anthony M. Masiello
