= Anthony F. Tauriello =

American politician

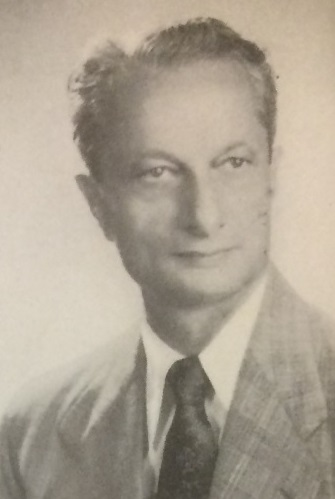
- Tauriello in 1949

Member of the U.S. House of Representatives from New York's 43rd district
- In office January 3, 1949 – January 3, 1951
- Preceded by: Edward J. Elsaesser
- Succeeded by: Edmund P. Radwan

Personal details
- Born: Anthony Francis Tauriello; August 14, 1899 Buffalo, New York, U.S.
- Died: December 21, 1983 (aged 84) Buffalo, New York, U.S.
- Resting place: United German and French Cemetery in Cheektowaga, New York
- Party: Democratic
- Relations: Joseph A. Tauriello (nephew)
- Education: Samford University (LLB)

Anthony Francis Tauriello (August 14, 1899 – December 21, 1983) was an American politician and attorney who represented New York's 43rd congressional district in the United States House of Representatives from 1949 to 1951.

== Early life and education ==
Tauriello was born in Buffalo, New York on August 14, 1899, and graduated with a law degree from Cumberland University in 1929.

== Career ==
Tauriello was a member of the Erie County Board of Supervisors from 1933 to 1937; also, he was a member of the Buffalo Common Council from 1938 to 1941, and again in 1948.

=== Congress ===
He served in the United States House of Representatives as a Democrat from January 3, 1949, to January 3, 1951.

=== Later career ===
After losing re-election in 1950 and 1952, he served on the Buffalo Common Council from 1954 to 1957 and was appointed to the Buffalo Municipal Housing Authority from 1961 to 1973.

== Personal life ==
He died in Buffalo on December 21, 1983. He is buried at United German and French Cemetery in Cheektowaga, New York.

State Senator Joseph A. Tauriello (1934–2009) was his nephew.

U.S. House of Representatives
Preceded by Edward J. Elsaesser	Member of the U.S. House of Representatives from New York's 43rd congressional district 1949–1951	Succeeded by Edmund P. Radwan
