= 1956 United States House of Representatives elections =

House elections for the 85th U.S. Congress

- November 6, 1956 (Note: The Maine elections were held September 10, 1956.)

All 435 seats in the United States House of Representatives 218 seats needed for a majority
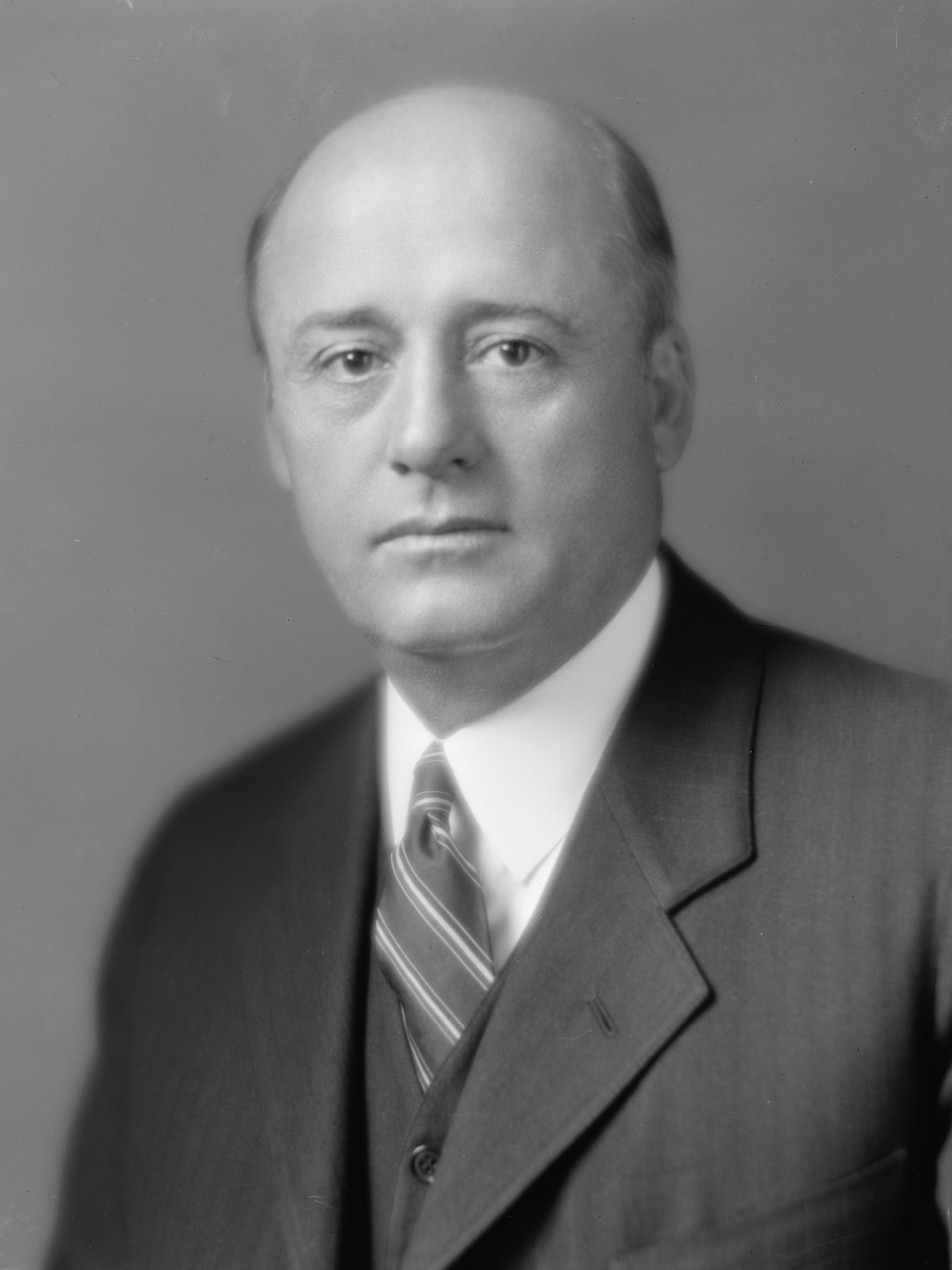

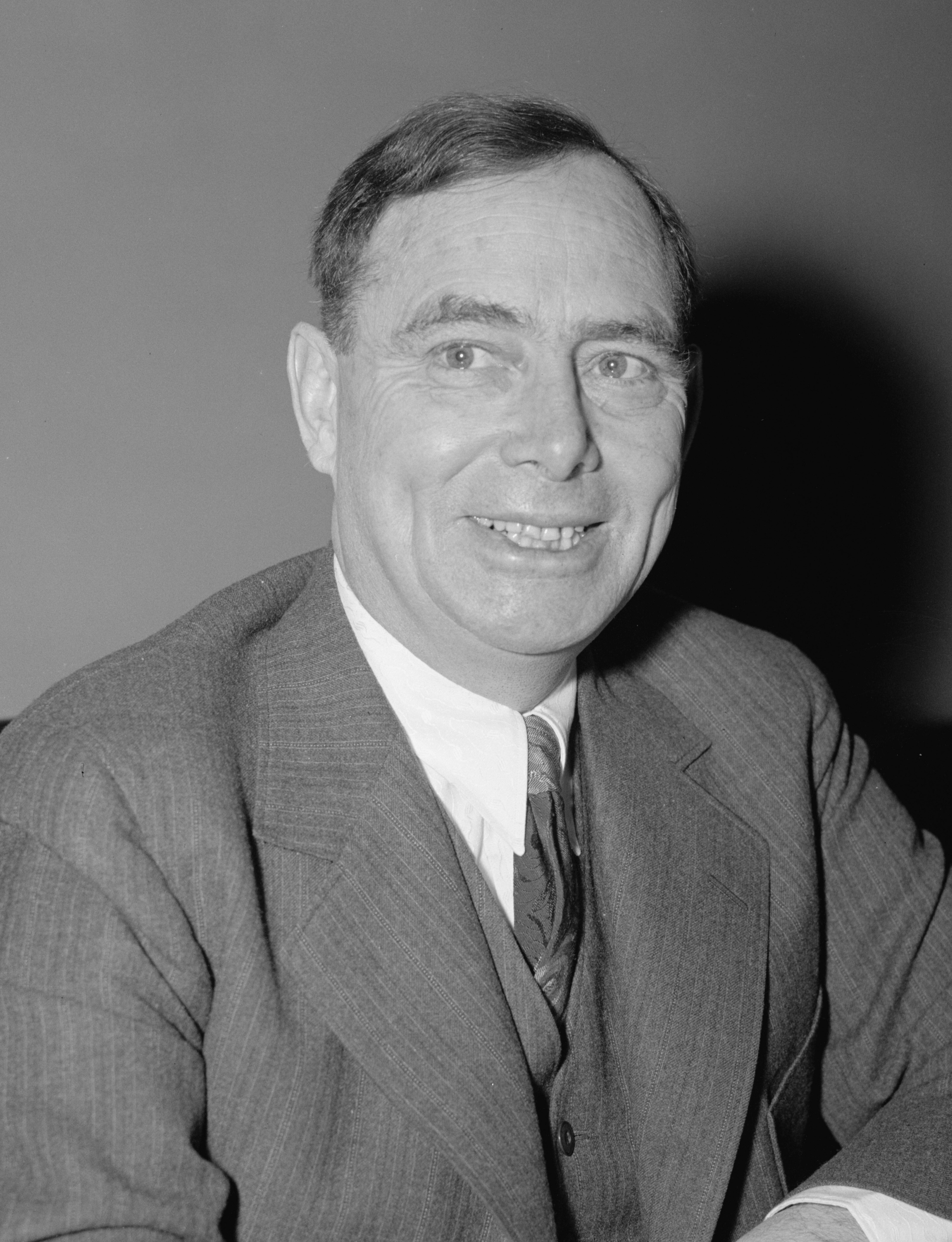
	Majority party	Minority party
Leader	Sam Rayburn	Joseph Martin
Party	Democratic	Republican
Leader since	September 16, 1940	January 3, 1939
Leader's seat	Texas 4th	Massachusetts 14th
Last election	232 seats	203 seats
Seats won	234	201
Seat change	▲2	▼2
Popular vote	30,062,042	28,698,083
Percentage	51.2%	48.7%
Swing	▼1.3pp	▲1.7pp
- Results: Democratic hold Democratic gain Republican hold Republican gain
Speaker before election
Sam Rayburn
Democratic
Elected Speaker
Sam Rayburn
Democratic

The 1956 United States House of Representatives elections was an election for the United States House of Representatives to elect members to serve in the 85th United States Congress. They were held for the most part on November 6, 1956, while Maine held theirs on September 10. They coincided with the re-election of President Dwight D. Eisenhower.

With no major national issues and the economic upswing of the 1950s in full force, voters generally chose to uphold the status quo, keeping the Republican president and the Democratic Congress.

== Overall results ==
410 incumbent members sought reelection, but 6 were defeated in primaries and 15 defeated in the general election for a total of 389 incumbents winning.

↓
234	201
Democratic	Republican

Party	Seats	Change	Seat percentage	Vote percentage	Popular Vote
Democratic	234	▲2	53.8%	51.2%	30,062,042
Republican	201	▼2	46.2%	48.7%	28,698,083
Liberal	0	Steady	0.0%	0.1%	68,130
Independent	0	Steady	0.0%	<0.1%	15,848
Prohibition	0	Steady	0.0%	<0.1%	12,298
Independent Teacher Veteran	0	Steady	0.0%	<0.1%	5,468
Independent Veteran	0	Steady	0.0%	<0.1%	4,155
Conservative	0	Steady	0.0%	<0.1%	4,066
Constitution	0	Steady	0.0%	<0.1%	3,619
Decency in Government	0	Steady	0.0%	<0.1%	2,459
Progress Through Freedom	0	Steady	0.0%	<0.1%	2,246
Socialist Labor	0	Steady	0.0%	<0.1%	2,217
Socialist	0	Steady	0.0%	<0.1%	1,743
Free Honest Elections	0	Steady	0.0%	<0.1%	466
Socialist Workers	0	Steady	0.0%	<0.1%	303
Social Democratic	0	Steady	0.0%	<0.1%	260
American Third	0	Steady	0.0%	<0.1%	146
Others	0	Steady	0.0%	<0.1%	2,194
Totals	435	Steady	100.0%	100.0%	58,885,743
Source: Election Statistics - Office of the Clerk

Popular vote
Democratic	51.05%
Republican	48.74%
Others	0.21%

House seats
Democratic	53.79%
Republican	46.21%

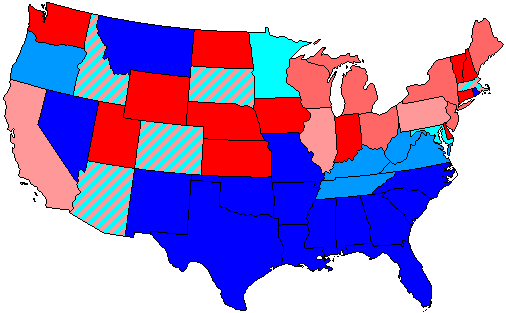
House seats by party holding plurality in state: 80+ to 100% Republican / 80+ to 100% Democratic; 60+ to 80% Republican / 60+ to 80% Democratic; Up to 60% Republican / Up to 60% Democratic

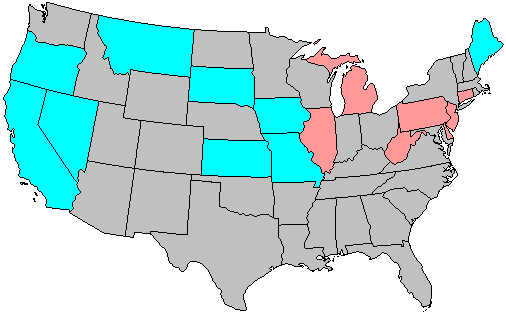
6+ Republican gain / 6+ Democratic gain; 3-5 Republican gain / 3-5 Democratic gain; 1-2 Republican gain / 1-2 Democratic gain; no net change

== Special elections ==
In these special elections, the winner was seated during 1956 or before January 3, 1957; ordered by election date.

District	Incumbent			Results	Candidates
District	Member	Party	First elected	Results	Candidates
Pennsylvania 30th	Vera D. Buchanan	Democratic	1950	Incumbent died November 26, 1955. New member elected January 24, 1956. Democratic hold.	▌ ✓ Elmer J. Holland (Democratic) 75.3%; ▌David J. Smith (Republican) 24.7%
New York 22nd	Sidney A. Fine	Democratic	1950	Incumbent resigned January 2, 1956. New member elected February 7, 1956. Democratic hold.	▌ ✓ James C. Healey (Democratic) 72.3%; ▌Sidney Burstein (Liberal) 14.8%; ▌Barnett Davis (Republican) 12.9%
Pennsylvania 2nd	William T. Granahan	Democratic	1944; 1946 (Lost); 1948	Incumbent died May 25, 1956. New member elected November 6, 1956. Democratic hold.	▌ ✓ Kathryn E. Granahan (Democratic) 61.9%; ▌Robert F. Frankenfield (Republican) 38.1%

== Alabama ==
District	Incumbent			Results	Candidates
District	Senator	Party	First elected	Results	Candidates
Alabama 1	Frank W. Boykin	Democratic	1935 (special)	Incumbent re-elected.	▌ ✓ Frank W. Boykin (Democratic); Uncontested
Alabama 2	George M. Grant	Democratic	1938	Incumbent re-elected.	▌ ✓ George M. Grant (Democratic); Uncontested
Alabama 3	George W. Andrews	Democratic	1944	Incumbent re-elected.	▌ ✓ George W. Andrews (Democratic); Uncontested
Alabama 4	Kenneth A. Roberts	Democratic	1950	Incumbent re-elected.	▌ ✓ Kenneth A. Roberts (Democratic) 73.4%; ▌Roy Banks (Republican) 26.6%
Alabama 5	Albert Rains	Democratic	1944	Incumbent re-elected.	▌ ✓ Albert Rains (Democratic); Uncontested
Alabama 6	Armistead Selden	Democratic	1952	Incumbent re-elected.	▌ ✓ Armistead Selden (Democratic); Uncontested
Alabama 7	Carl Elliott	Democratic	1948	Incumbent re-elected.	▌ ✓ Carl Elliott (Democratic); Uncontested
Alabama 8	Robert E. Jones Jr.	Democratic	1947 (special)	Incumbent re-elected.	▌ ✓ Robert E. Jones Jr. (Democratic) 80.7%; ▌J. G. Fortney (Republican) 19.3%
Alabama 9	George Huddleston Jr.	Democratic	1954	Incumbent re-elected.	▌ ✓ George Huddleston Jr. (Democratic) 65.9%; ▌William L. Longshore Jr. (Republican) 34.1%

== Arizona ==
District	Incumbent			Results	Candidates
District	Senator	Party	First elected	Results	Candidates
Arizona 1	John Jacob Rhodes	Republican	1952	Incumbent re-elected.	▌ ✓ John Jacob Rhodes (Republican) 54.9%; ▌William P. Mahoney (Democratic) 45.1%
Arizona 2	Stewart Udall	Democratic	1954	Incumbent re-elected.	▌ ✓ Stewart Udall (Democratic) 60.1%; ▌Jack Speiden (Republican) 39.9%

== Arkansas ==
District	Incumbent			Results	Candidates
District	Senator	Party	First elected	Results	Candidates
Arkansas 1	Ezekiel C. Gathings	Democratic	1938	Incumbent re-elected.	▌ ✓ Ezekiel C. Gathings (Democratic); Uncontested
Arkansas 2	Wilbur Mills	Democratic	1938	Incumbent re-elected.	▌ ✓ Wilbur Mills (Democratic); Uncontested
Arkansas 3	James William Trimble	Democratic	1944	Incumbent re-elected.	▌ ✓ James William Trimble (Democratic) 61.3%; ▌William S. Spicer (Republican) 38.7%
Arkansas 4	Oren Harris	Democratic	1940	Incumbent re-elected.	▌ ✓ Oren Harris (Democratic); Uncontested
Arkansas 5	Brooks Hays	Democratic	1942	Incumbent re-elected.	▌ ✓ Brooks Hays (Democratic); Uncontested
Arkansas 6	William F. Norrell	Democratic	1938	Incumbent re-elected.	▌ ✓ William F. Norrell (Democratic); Uncontested

== California ==
District	Incumbent			Results	Candidates
District	Senator	Party	First elected	Results	Candidates
California 1	Hubert B. Scudder	Republican	1948	Incumbent re-elected.	▌ ✓ Hubert B. Scudder (Republican) 53.6%; ▌Clem Miller (Democratic) 46.4%
California 2	Clair Engle	Democratic	1943 (special)	Incumbent re-elected.	▌ ✓ Clair Engle (Democratic); Uncontested
California 3	John E. Moss	Democratic	1952	Incumbent re-elected.	▌ ✓ John E. Moss (Democratic) 68.6%; ▌Noel C. Stevenson (Republican) 31.4%
California 4	William S. Mailliard	Republican	1952	Incumbent re-elected.	▌ ✓ William S. Mailliard (Republican) 61.9%; ▌James L. Quigley (Democratic) 38.1%
California 5	John F. Shelley	Democratic	1949 (special)	Incumbent re-elected.	▌ ✓ John F. Shelley (Democratic); Uncontested
California 6	John F. Baldwin Jr.	Republican	1954	Incumbent re-elected.	▌ ✓ John F. Baldwin Jr. (Republican) 53.7%; ▌H. Roberts Quinney (Democratic) 46.3%
California 7	John J. Allen Jr.	Republican	1946	Incumbent re-elected.	▌ ✓ John J. Allen Jr. (Republican) 52.8%; ▌Laurance L. Cross (Democratic) 47.2%
California 8	George P. Miller	Democratic	1944	Incumbent re-elected.	▌ ✓ George P. Miller (Democratic) 65.6%; ▌Robert Lee Watkins (Republican) 34.4%
California 9	J. Arthur Younger	Republican	1952	Incumbent re-elected.	▌ ✓ J. Arthur Younger (Republican) 60.3%; ▌James T. McKay (Democratic) 39.7%
California 10	Charles Gubser	Republican	1952	Incumbent re-elected.	▌ ✓ Charles Gubser (Republican) 60.7%; ▌William H. Vatcher Jr. (Democratic) 39.3%
California 11	J. Leroy Johnson	Republican	1942	Incumbent lost re-election. New member elected. Democratic gain.	▌ ✓ John J. McFall (Democratic) 53.1%; ▌J. Leroy Johnson (Republican) 46.9%
California 12	B. F. Sisk	Democratic	1954	Incumbent re-elected.	▌ ✓ B. F. Sisk (Democratic) 73.0%; ▌Robert B. Moore (Republican) 27.0%
California 13	Charles M. Teague	Republican	1954	Incumbent re-elected.	▌ ✓ Charles M. Teague (Republican) 59.6%; ▌William Kirk Stewart (Democratic) 40.4%
California 14	Harlan Hagen	Democratic	1952	Incumbent re-elected.	▌ ✓ Harlan Hagen (Democratic) 63.0%; ▌Myron D. Tisdel (Republican) 37.0%
California 15	Gordon L. McDonough	Republican	1944	Incumbent re-elected.	▌ ✓ Gordon L. McDonough (Republican) 57.9%; ▌Emery S. Petty (Democratic) 42.1%
California 16	Donald L. Jackson	Republican	1946	Incumbent re-elected.	▌ ✓ Donald L. Jackson (Republican) 60.8%; ▌G. Robert Fleming (Democratic) 39.2%
California 17	Cecil R. King	Democratic	1942	Incumbent re-elected.	▌ ✓ Cecil R. King (Democratic) 64.9%; ▌Charles A. Franklin (Republican) 35.1%
California 18	Craig Hosmer	Republican	1952	Incumbent re-elected.	▌ ✓ Craig Hosmer (Republican) 59.3%; ▌Raymond C. Simpson (Democratic) 40.7%
California 19	Chet Holifield	Democratic	1942	Incumbent re-elected.	▌ ✓ Chet Holifield (Democratic) 73.8%; ▌Roy E. Reynolds (Republican) 26.2%
California 20	Vacant			John Carl Hinshaw (R) died August 5, 1956. New member elected. Republican hold.	▌ ✓ H. Allen Smith (Republican) 70.8%; ▌Eugene Radding (Democratic) 29.2%
California 21	Edgar W. Hiestand	Republican	1952	Incumbent re-elected.	▌ ✓ Edgar W. Hiestand (Republican) 62.6%; ▌W. C. Stethem (Democratic) 37.4%
California 22	Joseph F. Holt	Republican	1952	Incumbent re-elected.	▌ ✓ Joseph F. Holt (Republican) 59.8%; ▌Irving Glasband (Democratic) 40.2%
California 23	Clyde Doyle	Democratic	1948	Incumbent re-elected.	▌ ✓ Clyde Doyle (Democratic) 70.9%; ▌E. Elgie Calvin (Republican) 29.1%
California 24	Glenard P. Lipscomb	Republican	1953 (special)	Incumbent re-elected.	▌ ✓ Glenard P. Lipscomb (Republican) 61.9%; ▌Fay Porter (Democratic) 38.1%
California 25	Patrick J. Hillings	Republican	1950	Incumbent re-elected.	▌ ✓ Patrick J. Hillings (Republican) 63.8%; ▌John G. Sobieski (Democratic) 36.2%
California 26	James Roosevelt	Democratic	1954	Incumbent re-elected.	▌ ✓ James Roosevelt (Democratic) 68.8%; ▌Edward H. Gibbons (Republican) 31.2%
California 27	Harry R. Sheppard	Democratic	1936	Incumbent re-elected.	▌ ✓ Harry R. Sheppard (Democratic); Uncontested
California 28	James B. Utt	Republican	1952	Incumbent re-elected.	▌ ✓ James B. Utt (Republican) 64.5%; ▌Gordon T. Shepard (Democratic) 35.5%
California 29	John Phillips	Republican	1942	Incumbent retired. New member elected. Democratic gain.	▌ ✓ Dalip Singh Saund (Democratic) 51.5%; ▌Jacqueline Cochran Odlum (Republican) 48.5%
California 30	Bob Wilson	Republican	1952	Incumbent re-elected.	▌ ✓ Bob Wilson (Republican) 66.7%; ▌George A. Cheney (Democratic) 33.3%

== Colorado ==
District	Incumbent			Results	Candidates
District	Senator	Party	First elected	Results	Candidates
Colorado 1	Byron G. Rogers	Democratic	1950	Incumbent re-elected.	▌ ✓ Byron G. Rogers (Democratic) 57.8%; ▌Ellen G. Harris (Republican) 42.2%
Colorado 2	William S. Hill	Republican	1940	Incumbent re-elected.	▌ ✓ William S. Hill (Republican) 53.4%; ▌Byron L. Johnson (Democratic) 46.6%
Colorado 3	John Chenoweth	Republican	1950	Incumbent re-elected.	▌ ✓ John Chenoweth (Republican) 50.2%; ▌Alva B. Adams (Democratic) 49.8%
Colorado 4	Wayne N. Aspinall	Democratic	1948	Incumbent re-elected.	▌ ✓ Wayne N. Aspinall (Democratic) 61.8%; ▌Hugh L. Caldwell (Republican) 38.2%

== Connecticut ==
District	Incumbent			Results	Candidates
District	Senator	Party	First elected	Results	Candidates
Connecticut 1	Thomas J. Dodd	Democratic	1952	Retired to run for U. S. Senate. Republican gain.	▌ ✓ Edwin H. May Jr. (Republican) 53.5%; ▌Patrick J. Ward (Democratic) 46.1%; ▌Donald B. LaCroix (Ind. Republican) 0.4%
Connecticut 2	Horace Seely-Brown Jr.	Republican	1950	Incumbent re-elected.	▌ ✓ Horace Seely-Brown Jr. (Republican) 59.0%; ▌Douglas J. Bennet (Democratic) 41.0%
Connecticut 3	Albert W. Cretella	Republican	1952	Incumbent re-elected.	▌ ✓ Albert W. Cretella (Republican) 60.0%; ▌Robert Giaimo (Democratic) 40.0%
Connecticut 4	Albert P. Morano	Republican	1950	Incumbent re-elected.	▌ ✓ Albert P. Morano (Republican) 68.4%; ▌Jack Stock (Democratic) 31.1%; ▌Harold Saunders (Socialist) 0.5%
Connecticut 5	James T. Patterson	Republican	1946	Incumbent re-elected.	▌ ✓ James T. Patterson (Republican) 61.9%; ▌Luke F. Martin (Democratic) 38.1%
Connecticut at-large	Antoni Sadlak	Republican	1946	Incumbent re-elected.	▌ ✓ Antoni Sadlak (Republican) 61.5%; ▌Matthew P. Kuta (Democratic) 38.5%

== Delaware ==
District	Incumbent			Results	Candidates
District	Senator	Party	First elected	Results	Candidates
Delaware at-large	Harris McDowell	Democratic	1954	Incumbent lost re-election. Republican gain.	▌ ✓ Harry G. Haskell Jr. (Republican) 52.0%; ▌Harris McDowell (Democratic) 48.0%

== Florida ==
District	Incumbent			Results	Candidates
District	Senator	Party	First elected	Results	Candidates
Florida 1	William C. Cramer	Republican	1954	Incumbent re-elected.	▌ ✓ William C. Cramer (Republican) 56.4%; ▌Winton H. King (Democratic) 43.6%
Florida 2	Charles E. Bennett	Democratic	1948	Incumbent re-elected.	▌ ✓ Charles E. Bennett (Democratic); Uncontested
Florida 3	Bob Sikes	Democratic	1940; 1944 (resigned); 1974	Incumbent re-elected.	▌ ✓ Bob Sikes (Democratic) 89.6%; ▌Arthur Barker (Republican) 10.4%
Florida 4	Dante Fascell	Democratic	1954	Incumbent re-elected.	▌ ✓ Dante Fascell (Democratic) 60.9%; ▌Leland Hyzer (Republican) 39.1%
Florida 5	Syd Herlong	Democratic	1948	Incumbent re-elected.	▌ ✓ Syd Herlong (Democratic) 51.4%; ▌Arnold L. Lund (Republican) 48.6%
Florida 6	Paul Rogers	Democratic	1954	Incumbent re-elected.	▌ ✓ Paul Rogers (Democratic) 54.7%; ▌Dorothy A. Smith (Republican) 45.3%
Florida 7	James A. Haley	Democratic	1952	Incumbent re-elected.	▌ ✓ James A. Haley (Democratic) 62.4%; ▌Gus Nelson (Republican) 37.6%
Florida 8	Donald Ray Matthews	Democratic	1952	Incumbent re-elected.	▌ ✓ Donald Ray Matthews (Democratic); Uncontested

== Georgia ==
District	Incumbent			Results	Candidates
District	Senator	Party	First elected	Results	Candidates
Georgia 1	Prince Preston	Democratic	1946	Incumbent re-elected.	▌ ✓ Prince Preston (Democratic) 78.3%; ▌Harry P. Anestos (Independent) 21.2%; ▌Other (Republican) 0.5%
Georgia 2	J. L. Pilcher	Democratic	1953 (special)	Incumbent re-elected.	▌ ✓ J. L. Pilcher (Democratic) 100.0%; ▌Albert Maples (Independent) 0.01%
Georgia 3	Tic Forrester	Democratic	1950	Incumbent re-elected.	▌ ✓ Tic Forrester (Democratic) 100.0%; ▌J. M. Brophy (Republican) 0.004%
Georgia 4	John Flynt	Democratic	1954	Incumbent re-elected.	▌ ✓ John Flynt (Democratic) 100.0%; ▌Other (Republican) 0.03%
Georgia 5	James C. Davis	Democratic	1946	Incumbent re-elected.	▌ ✓ James C. Davis (Democratic) 59.2%; ▌Randolph W. Thrower (Republican) 40.8%; ▌Joe McDow (Independent) 0.001%
Georgia 6	Carl Vinson	Democratic	1914	Incumbent re-elected.	▌ ✓ Carl Vinson (Democratic); Uncontested
Georgia 7	Henderson Lovelace Lanham	Democratic	1946	Incumbent re-elected.	▌ ✓ Henderson Lovelace Lanham (Democratic) 99.7%; ▌H. M. King (Republican) 0.3%
Georgia 8	Iris Faircloth Blitch	Democratic	1954	Incumbent re-elected.	▌ ✓ Iris Faircloth Blitch (Democratic) 100.0%; ▌J. M. Kent (Republican) 0.006%
Georgia 9	Phil Landrum	Democratic	1952	Incumbent re-elected.	▌ ✓ Phil Landrum (Democratic); Uncontested
Georgia 10	Paul Brown	Democratic	1933 (special)	Incumbent re-elected.	▌ ✓ Paul Brown (Democratic) 99.8%; ▌Others (Republican) 0.2%

== Idaho ==
District	Incumbent			Results	Candidates
District	Senator	Party	First elected	Results	Candidates
Idaho 1	Gracie Pfost	Democratic	1952	Incumbent re-elected.	▌ ✓ Gracie Pfost (Democratic) 55.1%; ▌Louise Shadduck (Republican) 44.9%
Idaho 2	Hamer H. Budge	Republican	1950	Incumbent re-elected.	▌ ✓ Hamer H. Budge (Republican) 60.0%; ▌J. W. Reynolds (Democratic) 40.0%

== Illinois ==
District	Incumbent			Results	Candidates
District	Senator	Party	First elected	Results	Candidates
Illinois 1	William L. Dawson	Democratic	1942	Incumbent re-elected.	▌ ✓ William L. Dawson (Democratic) 64.4%; ▌George W. Lawrence (Republican) 35.6%
Illinois 2	Barratt O'Hara	Democratic	1948; 1950 (defeated); 1952	Incumbent re-elected.	▌ ✓ Barratt O'Hara (Democratic) 55.3%; ▌George B. McKibbin (Republican) 44.7%
Illinois 3	James C. Murray	Democratic	1954	Incumbent lost re-election. Republican gain.	▌ ✓ Emmet Byrne (Republican) 51.4%; ▌James C. Murray (Democratic) 48.6%
Illinois 4	William E. McVey	Republican	1950	Incumbent re-elected.	▌ ✓ William E. McVey (Republican) 60.0%; ▌Michael Hinko (Democratic) 40.0%
Illinois 5	John C. Kluczynski	Democratic	1950	Incumbent re-elected.	▌ ✓ John C. Kluczynski (Democratic) 61.8%; ▌Lawrence Welnowski (Republican) 38.2%
Illinois 6	Thomas J. O'Brien	Democratic	1942	Incumbent re-elected.	▌ ✓ Thomas J. O'Brien (Democratic) 62.0%; ▌John J. Dillon (Republican) 38.0%
Illinois 7	James Bowler	Democratic	1953 (special)	Incumbent re-elected.	▌ ✓ James Bowler (Democratic) 71.7%; ▌Gabriel L. Grimaldi (Republican) 28.3%
Illinois 8	Thomas S. Gordon	Democratic	1942	Incumbent re-elected.	▌ ✓ Thomas S. Gordon (Democratic) 59.5%; ▌Victor O. Wright (Republican) 40.5%
Illinois 9	Sidney R. Yates	Democratic	1948	Incumbent re-elected.	▌ ✓ Sidney R. Yates (Democratic) 54.0%; ▌Johann S. Ackerman (Republican) 46.0%
Illinois 10	Richard W. Hoffman	Republican	1948	Incumbent retired. Republican hold.	▌ ✓ Harold R. Collier (Republican) 64.4%; ▌Marvin E. Lore (Democratic) 35.6%
Illinois 11	Timothy P. Sheehan	Republican	1950	Incumbent re-elected.	▌ ✓ Timothy P. Sheehan (Republican) 55.5%; ▌Roman Pucinski (Democratic) 44.5%
Illinois 12	Charles A. Boyle	Democratic	1954	Incumbent re-elected.	▌ ✓ Charles A. Boyle (Democratic) 53.2%; ▌Edgar A. Jonas (Republican) 46.8%
Illinois 13	Marguerite S. Church	Republican	1950	Incumbent re-elected.	▌ ✓ Marguerite S. Church (Republican) 71.6%; ▌Helen Benson Leys (Democratic) 28.4%
Illinois 14	Vacant			Chauncey W. Reed (R) died February 9, 1956. Republican hold.	▌ ✓ Russell W. Keeney (Republican) 70.6%; ▌Harold J. Spelman (Democratic) 29.4%
Illinois 15	Noah M. Mason	Republican	1936	Incumbent re-elected.	▌ ✓ Noah M. Mason (Republican) 64.6%; ▌Stanley Hubbs (Democratic) 35.4%
Illinois 16	Leo E. Allen	Republican	1932	Incumbent re-elected.	▌ ✓ Leo E. Allen (Republican) 63.7%; ▌Glen F. Kunkle (Democratic) 36.3%
Illinois 17	Leslie C. Arends	Republican	1934	Incumbent re-elected.	▌ ✓ Leslie C. Arends (Republican) 64.9%; ▌C. E. Spang (Democratic) 35.1%
Illinois 18	Harold H. Velde	Republican	1948	Incumbent retired. Republican hold.	▌ ✓ Robert H. Michel (Republican) 58.8%; ▌Fred Allen (Democratic) 41.2%
Illinois 19	Robert B. Chiperfield	Republican	1938	Incumbent re-elected.	▌ ✓ Robert B. Chiperfield (Republican) 55.8%; ▌Martin P. Sutor (Democratic) 44.2%
Illinois 20	Sid Simpson	Republican	1942	Incumbent re-elected.	▌ ✓ Sid Simpson (Republican) 59.6%; ▌Henry W. Pollock (Democratic) 40.4%
Illinois 21	Peter F. Mack Jr.	Democratic	1948	Incumbent re-elected.	▌ ✓ Peter F. Mack Jr. (Democratic) 53.5%; ▌Frederic S. O'Hara (Republican) 46.5%
Illinois 22	William L. Springer	Republican	1950	Incumbent re-elected.	▌ ✓ William L. Springer (Republican) 62.3%; ▌E. H. Winegarner (Democratic) 37.7%
Illinois 23	Charles W. Vursell	Republican	1942	Incumbent re-elected.	▌ ✓ Charles W. Vursell (Republican) 52.6%; ▌Albert R. Imle (Democratic) 47.4%
Illinois 24	Melvin Price	Democratic	1944	Incumbent re-elected.	▌ ✓ Melvin Price (Democratic) 68.2%; ▌Waldo E. Schellenger (Republican) 31.8%
Illinois 25	Kenneth J. Gray	Democratic	1954	Incumbent re-elected.	▌ ✓ Kenneth J. Gray (Democratic) 53.8%; ▌Samuel J. Scott (Republican) 46.2%

== Indiana ==
District	Incumbent			Results	Candidates
District	Senator	Party	First elected	Results	Candidates
Indiana 1	Ray Madden	Democratic	1942	Incumbent re-elected.	▌ ✓ Ray Madden (Democratic) 52.6%; ▌Donald K. Stimson Jr. (Republican) 47.2%; ▌Harry C. Beamer (Prohibition) 0.2%
Indiana 2	Charles A. Halleck	Republican	1935 (special)	Incumbent re-elected.	▌ ✓ Charles A. Halleck (Republican) 62.2%; ▌Thurman C. Crook (Democratic) 37.4%; ▌J. O. Johnston (Prohibition) 0.3%
Indiana 3	Shepard Crumpacker	Republican	1950	Incumbent retired. Republican hold.	▌ ✓ F. Jay Nimtz (Republican) 53.1%; ▌John Brademas (Democratic) 46.9%
Indiana 4	E. Ross Adair	Republican	1950	Incumbent re-elected.	▌ ✓ E. Ross Adair (Republican) 63.4%; ▌F. Dean Bechtol (Democratic) 36.3%; ▌Claude Swartz (Prohibition) 0.2%
Indiana 5	John V. Beamer	Republican	1950	Incumbent re-elected.	▌ ✓ John V. Beamer (Republican) 56.4%; ▌William Catlin Whitehead (Democratic) 43.1%; ▌Ralph G. Stallsmith (Prohibition) 0.5%
Indiana 6	Cecil M. Harden	Republican	1948	Incumbent re-elected.	▌ ✓ Cecil M. Harden (Republican) 55.0%; ▌John W. King (Democratic) 44.8%; ▌Woodrow Shields (Prohibition) 0.2%
Indiana 7	William G. Bray	Republican	1950	Incumbent re-elected.	▌ ✓ William G. Bray (Republican) 57.2%; ▌Vernon R. Hill (Democratic) 42.8%
Indiana 8	Winfield K. Denton	Democratic	1954	Incumbent re-elected.	▌ ✓ Winfield K. Denton (Democratic) 50.1%; ▌D. Bailey Merrill (Republican) 49.7%; ▌Raymond Morris (Prohibition) 0.3%
Indiana 9	Earl Wilson	Republican	1940	Incumbent re-elected.	▌ ✓ Earl Wilson (Republican) 53.4%; ▌Wilfrid J. Ullirch (Democratic) 46.3%; ▌Elmer D. Riggs (Prohibition) 0.3%
Indiana 10	Ralph Harvey	Republican	1947 (special)	Incumbent re-elected.	▌ ✓ Ralph Harvey (Republican) 56.3%; ▌Gerald C. Carmony (Democratic) 43.3%; ▌Thomas E. Booher (Prohibition) 0.4%
Indiana 11	Charles B. Brownson	Republican	1950	Incumbent re-elected.	▌ ✓ Charles B. Brownson (Republican) 59.4%; ▌John C. Carvey (Democratic) 40.5%; ▌Paul W. Cox (Prohibition) 0.2%

== Iowa ==
District	Incumbent			Results	Candidates
District	Senator	Party	First elected	Results	Candidates
Iowa 1	Fred Schwengel	Republican	1954	Incumbent re-elected.	▌ ✓ Fred Schwengel (Republican) 58.0%; ▌Ronald O. Bramhall (Democratic) 42.0%
Iowa 2	Henry O. Talle	Republican	1938	Incumbent re-elected.	▌ ✓ Henry O. Talle (Republican) 51.4%; ▌Leonard G. Wolf (Democratic) 48.6%
Iowa 3	H. R. Gross	Republican	1948	Incumbent re-elected.	▌ ✓ H. R. Gross (Republican) 58.6%; ▌Michael Micich (Democratic) 41.4%
Iowa 4	Karl M. LeCompte	Republican	1938	Incumbent re-elected.	▌ ✓ Karl M. LeCompte (Republican) 50.7%; ▌Steven V. Carter (Democratic) 49.3%
Iowa 5	Paul Cunningham	Republican	1940	Incumbent re-elected.	▌ ✓ Paul Cunningham (Republican) 51.1%; ▌William F. Denman (Democratic) 48.9%
Iowa 6	James I. Dolliver	Republican	1944	Incumbent lost re-election. Democratic gain.	▌ ✓ Merwin Coad (Democratic) 50.1%; ▌James I. Dolliver (Republican) 49.9%
Iowa 7	Ben F. Jensen	Republican	1938	Incumbent re-elected.	▌ ✓ Ben F. Jensen (Republican) 55.4%; ▌John L. Jensen (Democratic) 44.6%
Iowa 8	Charles B. Hoeven	Republican	1942	Incumbent re-elected.	▌ ✓ Charles B. Hoeven (Republican) 60.1%; ▌Robert J. Salem (Democratic) 39.9%

== Kansas ==
District	Incumbent			Results	Candidates
District	Senator	Party	First elected	Results	Candidates
Kansas 1	William H. Avery	Republican	1954	Incumbent re-elected.	▌ ✓ William H. Avery (Republican) 53.1%; ▌Howard S. Miller (Democratic) 45.8%; ▌Howard Hadin (Prohibition) 1.1%
Kansas 2	Errett P. Scrivner	Republican	1943 (special)	Incumbent re-elected.	▌ ✓ Errett P. Scrivner (Republican) 54.9%; ▌Newell A. George (Democratic) 45.1%
Kansas 3	Myron V. George	Republican	1950	Incumbent re-elected.	▌ ✓ Myron V. George (Republican) 55.0%; ▌Denver D. Hargis (Democratic) 45.0%
Kansas 4	Edward Herbert Rees	Republican	1936	Incumbent re-elected.	▌ ✓ Edward Herbert Rees (Republican) 53.8%; ▌John D. Montgomery (Democratic) 46.2%
Kansas 5	Clifford R. Hope	Republican	1926	Incumbent retired. Democratic gain.	▌ ✓ J. Floyd Breeding (Democratic) 50.5%; ▌John W. Crutcher (Republican) 49.5%
Kansas 6	Wint Smith	Republican	1946	Incumbent re-elected.	▌ ✓ Wint Smith (Republican) 51.1%; ▌Elmo J. Mahoney (Democratic) 48.9%

== Kentucky ==
District	Incumbent			Results	Candidates
District	Senator	Party	First elected	Results	Candidates
Kentucky 1	Noble Jones Gregory	Democratic	1936	Incumbent re-elected.	▌ ✓ Noble Jones Gregory (Democratic); Uncontested
Kentucky 2	William Natcher	Democratic	1953 (special)	Incumbent re-elected.	▌ ✓ William Natcher (Democratic) 51.3%; ▌R. B. Blakenship (Republican) 48.7%
Kentucky 3	John M. Robsion Jr.	Republican	1952	Incumbent re-elected.	▌ ✓ John M. Robsion Jr. (Republican) 56.8%; ▌Philip Ardery (Democratic) 43.2%
Kentucky 4	Frank Chelf	Democratic	1944	Incumbent re-elected.	▌ ✓ Frank Chelf (Democratic) 56.3%; ▌John Basil Preston (Republican) 43.7%
Kentucky 5	Brent Spence	Democratic	1930	Incumbent re-elected.	▌ ✓ Brent Spence (Democratic) 55.9%; ▌Jule Appel (Republican) 44.1%
Kentucky 6	John C. Watts	Democratic	1951 (special)	Incumbent re-elected.	▌ ✓ John C. Watts (Democratic) 52.7%; ▌Wallace Jones (Republican) 47.3%
Kentucky 7	Carl D. Perkins	Democratic	1948	Incumbent re-elected.	▌ ✓ Carl D. Perkins (Democratic) 52.4%; ▌Scott Craft (Republican) 47.6%; ▌Florence Montague (Prohibition) 0.08%
Kentucky 8	Eugene Siler	Republican	1954	Incumbent re-elected.	▌ ✓ Eugene Siler (Republican) 71.7%; ▌Mitchel S. Fannin (Democratic) 28.3%

== Louisiana ==
District	Incumbent			Results	Candidates
District	Senator	Party	First elected	Results	Candidates
Louisiana 1	F. Edward Hébert	Democratic	1940	Incumbent re-elected.	▌ ✓ F. Edward Hébert (Democratic); Uncontested
Louisiana 2	Hale Boggs	Democratic	1940; 1942 (lost); 1946	Incumbent re-elected.	▌ ✓ Hale Boggs (Democratic) 64.5%; ▌George R. Blue (Republican) 35.5%
Louisiana 3	Edwin E. Willis	Democratic	1948	Incumbent re-elected.	▌ ✓ Edwin E. Willis (Democratic); Uncontested
Louisiana 4	Overton Brooks	Democratic	1936	Incumbent re-elected.	▌ ✓ Overton Brooks (Democratic) 68.1%; ▌Calhoun Allen Jr. (Republican) 31.9%
Louisiana 5	Otto Passman	Democratic	1946	Incumbent re-elected.	▌ ✓ Otto Passman (Democratic); Uncontested
Louisiana 6	James H. Morrison	Democratic	1942	Incumbent re-elected.	▌ ✓ James H. Morrison (Democratic); Uncontested
Louisiana 7	T. Ashton Thompson	Democratic	1952	Incumbent re-elected.	▌ ✓ T. Ashton Thompson (Democratic); Uncontested
Louisiana 8	George S. Long	Democratic	1952	Incumbent re-elected.	▌ ✓ George S. Long (Democratic); Uncontested

== Maine ==
District	Incumbent			Results	Candidates
District	Senator	Party	First elected	Results	Candidates
Maine 1	Robert Hale	Republican	1942	Incumbent re-elected.	▌ ✓ Robert Hale (Republican) 50.0%; ▌James C. Oliver (Democratic) 50.0%
Maine 2	Charles P. Nelson	Republican	1948	Incumbent retired. Democratic gain.	▌ ✓ Frank M. Coffin (Democratic) 53.4%; ▌James L. Reid (Republican) 46.6%
Maine 3	Clifford McIntire	Republican	1951 (special)	Incumbent re-elected.	▌ ✓ Clifford McIntire (Republican) 60.6%; ▌Kenneth B. Colbath (Democratic) 39.4%

== Maryland ==
District	Incumbent			Results	Candidates
District	Senator	Party	First elected	Results	Candidates
Maryland 1	Edward T. Miller	Republican	1946	Incumbent re-elected.	▌ ✓ Edward T. Miller (Republican) 55.7%; ▌Hamilton P. Fox (Democratic) 44.3%
Maryland 2	James Devereux	Republican	1950	Incumbent re-elected.	▌ ✓ James Devereux (Republican) 58.1%; ▌A. Gordon Boone (Democratic) 41.9%
Maryland 3	Edward Garmatz	Democratic	1947 (special)	Incumbent re-elected.	▌ ✓ Edward Garmatz (Democratic) 69.7%; ▌Harry Kemper (Republican) 30.3%
Maryland 4	George Fallon	Democratic	1944	Incumbent re-elected.	▌ ✓ George Fallon (Democratic) 53.8%; ▌George Denys Hubbard (Republican) 46.2%
Maryland 5	Richard Lankford	Democratic	1954	Incumbent re-elected.	▌ ✓ Richard Lankford (Democratic) 56.8%; ▌William B. Prendergast (Republican) 43.2%
Maryland 6	DeWitt Hyde	Republican	1952	Incumbent re-elected.	▌ ✓ DeWitt Hyde (Republican) 54.2%; ▌John R. Foley (Democratic) 45.8%
Maryland 7	Samuel Friedel	Democratic	1952	Incumbent re-elected.	▌ ✓ Samuel Friedel (Democratic) 59.0%; ▌David A. Halley (Republican) 41.0%

== Massachusetts ==
District	Incumbent			Results	Candidates
District	Senator	Party	First elected	Results	Candidates
Massachusetts 1	John W. Heselton	Republican	1944	Incumbent re-elected.	▌ ✓ John W. Heselton (Republican) 63.6%; ▌Howard W. Shea (Democratic) 36.0%; ▌Gaetano T. Maratea (Prohibition) 0.4%
Massachusetts 2	Edward Boland	Democratic	1952	Incumbent re-elected.	▌ ✓ Edward Boland (Democratic) 61.2%; ▌Foster W. Doty (Republican) 38.8%
Massachusetts 3	Philip J. Philbin	Democratic	1942	Incumbent re-elected.	▌ ✓ Philip J. Philbin (Democratic) 70.9%; ▌Robert A. Parker (Republican) 29.1%
Massachusetts 4	Harold Donohue	Democratic	1946	Incumbent re-elected.	▌ ✓ Harold Donohue (Democratic) 59.4%; ▌Mary R. Wheller (Republican) 40.6%
Massachusetts 5	Edith Nourse Rogers	Republican	1925 (special)	Incumbent re-elected.	▌ ✓ Edith Nourse Rogers (Republican) 73.3%; ▌Lawrence E. Corcoran (Democratic) 26.7%
Massachusetts 6	William H. Bates	Republican	1950	Incumbent re-elected.	▌ ✓ William H. Bates (Republican); Uncontested
Massachusetts 7	Thomas J. Lane	Democratic	1941 (special)	Incumbent re-elected.	▌ ✓ Thomas J. Lane (Democratic) 68.5%; ▌Robert T. Breed (Republican) 31.5%
Massachusetts 8	Torbert Macdonald	Democratic	1954	Incumbent re-elected.	▌ ✓ Torbert Macdonald (Democratic) 54.8%; ▌C. Eugene Farnam (Republican) 45.2%
Massachusetts 9	Donald W. Nicholson	Republican	1947 (special)	Incumbent re-elected.	▌ ✓ Donald W. Nicholson (Republican) 61.1%; ▌William McAuliffe (Democratic) 38.9%
Massachusetts 10	Laurence Curtis	Republican	1952	Incumbent re-elected.	▌ ✓ Laurence Curtis (Republican) 53.0%; ▌Jackson J. Holtz (Democratic) 47.0%
Massachusetts 11	Tip O'Neill	Democratic	1952	Incumbent re-elected.	▌ ✓ Tip O'Neill (Democratic) 75.3%; ▌Rudolph E. Mottola (Republican) 24.7%
Massachusetts 12	John W. McCormack	Democratic	1928	Incumbent re-elected.	▌ ✓ John W. McCormack (Democratic) 82.5%; ▌James S. Tremblay (Republican) 17.5%
Massachusetts 13	Dick Wigglesworth	Republican	1928	Incumbent re-elected.	▌ ✓ Dick Wigglesworth (Republican) 55.6%; ▌Richard E. McCormack (Democratic) 44.4%
Massachusetts 14	Joseph W. Martin Jr.	Republican	1924	Incumbent re-elected.	▌ ✓ Joseph W. Martin Jr. (Republican) 62.4%; ▌Edward F. Doolan (Democratic) 37.6%

== Michigan ==
District	Incumbent			Results	Candidates
District	Senator	Party	First elected	Results	Candidates
Michigan 1	Thaddeus M. Machrowicz	Democratic	1950	Incumbent re-elected.	▌ ✓ Thaddeus M. Machrowicz (Democratic) 86.1%; ▌Walter Czarnecki (Republican) 13.9%
Michigan 2	George Meader	Republican	1950	Incumbent re-elected.	▌ ✓ George Meader (Republican) 63.1%; ▌Franklin J. Shepherd (Democratic) 36.6%; ▌Verdon R. Dunckel (Prohibition) 0.3%
Michigan 3	August E. Johansen	Republican	1954	Incumbent re-elected.	▌ ✓ August E. Johansen (Republican) 63.8%; ▌Truman Barkhuff (Democratic) 35.8%; ▌Clarence O. Button (Prohibition) 0.5%
Michigan 4	Clare Hoffman	Republican	1934	Incumbent re-elected.	▌ ✓ Clare Hoffman (Republican) 62.0%; ▌Samuel I. Clark (Democratic) 38.0%
Michigan 5	Gerald Ford	Republican	1948	Incumbent re-elected.	▌ ✓ Gerald Ford (Republican) 67.1%; ▌George E. Clay (Democratic) 32.9%
Michigan 6	Donald Hayworth	Democratic	1954	Incumbent lost re-election. Republican gain.	▌ ✓ Charles E. Chamberlain (Republican) 50.8%; ▌Donald Hayworth (Democratic) 49.0%; ▌Herbert E. Crouter (Prohibition) 0.2%
Michigan 7	Jesse P. Wolcott	Republican	1930	Incumbent retired. Republican hold.	▌ ✓ Robert J. McIntosh (Republican) 53.7%; ▌Ira D. McCoy (Democratic) 46.3%
Michigan 8	Alvin Morell Bentley	Republican	1952	Incumbent re-elected.	▌ ✓ Alvin Morell Bentley (Republican) 64.1%; ▌William R. Hart (Democratic) 35.6%; ▌D. Ruth Larson (Prohibition) 0.3%
Michigan 9	Ruth Thompson	Republican	1950	Incumbent lost renomination. Republican hold.	▌ ✓ Robert P. Griffin (Republican) 56.0%; ▌William E. Baker (Democratic) 44.0%
Michigan 10	Elford Albin Cederberg	Republican	1952	Incumbent re-elected.	▌ ✓ Elford Albin Cederberg (Republican) 65.6%; ▌William J. Kelly (Democratic) 34.4%
Michigan 11	Victor A. Knox	Republican	1952	Incumbent re-elected.	▌ ✓ Victor A. Knox (Republican) 56.1%; ▌Prentiss M. Brown Jr. (Democratic) 43.9%
Michigan 12	John B. Bennett	Republican	1946	Incumbent re-elected.	▌ ✓ John B. Bennett (Republican) 56.3%; ▌Joseph S. Mack (Democratic) 43.7%
Michigan 13	Charles Diggs	Democratic	1954	Incumbent re-elected.	▌ ✓ Charles Diggs (Democratic) 69.8%; ▌Willis F. Ward (Republican) 30.2%
Michigan 14	Louis C. Rabaut	Democratic	1948	Incumbent re-elected.	▌ ✓ Louis C. Rabaut (Democratic) 56.8%; ▌Harold F. Youngblood (Republican) 43.2%
Michigan 15	John D. Dingell Jr.	Democratic	1955 (special)	Incumbent re-elected.	▌ ✓ John D. Dingell Jr. (Democratic) 74.1%; ▌Larry Middleton (Republican) 25.8%; ▌Roxann Higgs (Prohibition) 0.1%
Michigan 16	John Lesinski Jr.	Democratic	1932	Incumbent re-elected.	▌ ✓ John Lesinski Jr. (Democratic) 64.1%; ▌Arthur Kurtz (Republican) 35.6%; ▌Earl A. Johnson (Prohibition) 0.3%
Michigan 17	Martha Griffiths	Democratic	1954	Incumbent re-elected.	▌ ✓ Martha Griffiths (Democratic) 53.3%; ▌George E. Smith (Republican) 46.5%; ▌Walter D. Carpenter (Prohibition) 0.2%
Michigan 18	George A. Dondero	Republican	1932	Incumbent retired. Republican hold.	▌ ✓ William Broomfield (Republican) 56.7%; ▌Paul Sutton (Democratic) 43.3%

== Minnesota ==
District	Incumbent			Results	Candidates
District	Senator	Party	First elected	Results	Candidates
Minnesota 1	August H. Andresen	Republican	1934	Incumbent re-elected.	▌ ✓ August H. Andresen (Republican) 61.5%; ▌Arnold L. Fredriksen (DFL) 38.5%
Minnesota 2	Joseph P. O'Hara	Republican	1940	Incumbent re-elected.	▌ ✓ Joseph P. O'Hara (Republican) 63.8%; ▌Harold Zupp (DFL) 36.2%
Minnesota 3	Roy Wier	Democratic-Farmer-Labor	1948	Incumbent re-elected.	▌ ✓ Roy Wier (DFL) 52.0%; ▌George Mikan (Republican) 48.0%
Minnesota 4	Eugene McCarthy	Democratic-Farmer-Labor	1948	Incumbent re-elected.	▌ ✓ Eugene McCarthy (DFL) 64.1%; ▌Edward C. Slettedahl (Republican) 35.9%
Minnesota 5	Walter Judd	Republican	1942	Incumbent re-elected.	▌ ✓ Walter Judd (Republican) 56.0%; ▌Joe Robbie (DFL) 44.0%
Minnesota 6	Fred Marshall	Democratic-Farmer-Labor	1948	Incumbent re-elected.	▌ ✓ Fred Marshall (DFL) 56.2%; ▌Joseph L. Kaczmarek (Republican) 43.8%
Minnesota 7	H. Carl Andersen	Republican	1938	Incumbent re-elected.	▌ ✓ H. Carl Andersen (Republican) 55.9%; ▌Clint Haroldson (DFL) 44.1%
Minnesota 8	John Blatnik	Democratic-Farmer-Labor	1946	Incumbent re-elected.	▌ ✓ John Blatnik (DFL) 73.2%; ▌Alfred J. Weinberg (Republican) 26.8%
Minnesota 9	Coya Knutson	Democratic-Farmer-Labor	1954	Incumbent re-elected.	▌ ✓ Coya Knutson (DFL) 52.7%; ▌Harold Hagen (Republican) 47.3%

== Mississippi ==
District	Incumbent			Results	Candidates
District	Senator	Party	First elected	Results	Candidates
Mississippi 1	Thomas Abernethy	Democratic	1942	Incumbent re-elected.	▌ ✓ Thomas Abernethy (Democratic); Uncontested
Mississippi 2	Jamie Whitten	Democratic	1941 (special)	Incumbent re-elected.	▌ ✓ Jamie Whitten (Democratic); Uncontested
Mississippi 3	Frank E. Smith	Democratic	1950	Incumbent re-elected.	▌ ✓ Frank E. Smith (Democratic); Uncontested
Mississippi 4	John Bell Williams	Democratic	1946	Incumbent re-elected.	▌ ✓ John Bell Williams (Democratic); Uncontested
Mississippi 5	W. Arthur Winstead	Democratic	1942	Incumbent re-elected.	▌ ✓ W. Arthur Winstead (Democratic); Uncontested
Mississippi 6	William M. Colmer	Democratic	1932	Incumbent re-elected.	▌ ✓ William M. Colmer (Democratic); Uncontested

== Missouri ==
District	Incumbent			Results	Candidates
District	Senator	Party	First elected	Results	Candidates
Missouri 1	Frank M. Karsten	Democratic	1946	Incumbent re-elected.	▌ ✓ Frank M. Karsten (Democratic) 66.3%; ▌Bill Bangert (Republican) 33.7%
Missouri 2	Thomas B. Curtis	Republican	1950	Incumbent re-elected.	▌ ✓ Thomas B. Curtis (Republican) 51.8%; ▌James L. Sullivan (Democratic) 48.2%
Missouri 3	Leonor Sullivan	Democratic	1952	Incumbent re-elected.	▌ ✓ Leonor Sullivan (Democratic) 69.6%; ▌Sidney R. Redmond (Republican) 30.4%
Missouri 4	George H. Christopher	Democratic	1954	Incumbent re-elected.	▌ ✓ George H. Christopher (Democratic) 51.8%; ▌Jeffrey P. Hillelson (Republican) 48.2%
Missouri 5	Richard Bolling	Democratic	1948	Incumbent re-elected.	▌ ✓ Richard Bolling (Democratic) 57.2%; ▌Lem T. Jones Jr. (Republican) 42.8%
Missouri 6	William Raleigh Hull Jr.	Democratic	1954	Incumbent re-elected.	▌ ✓ William Raleigh Hull Jr. (Democratic) 52.0%; ▌Stanley I. Dale (Republican) 48.0%
Missouri 7	Dewey Short	Republican	1934	Incumbent lost re-election. Democratic gain.	▌ ✓ Charles Harrison Brown (Democratic) 50.3%; ▌Dewey Short (Republican) 49.7%
Missouri 8	A. S. J. Carnahan	Democratic	1948	Incumbent re-elected.	▌ ✓ A. S. J. Carnahan (Democratic) 54.3%; ▌Frank W. May (Republican) 45.7%
Missouri 9	Clarence Cannon	Democratic	1922	Incumbent re-elected.	▌ ✓ Clarence Cannon (Democratic); Uncontested
Missouri 10	Paul C. Jones	Democratic	1948	Incumbent re-elected.	▌ ✓ Paul C. Jones (Democratic); Uncontested
Missouri 11	Morgan M. Moulder	Democratic	1948	Incumbent re-elected.	▌ ✓ Morgan M. Moulder (Democratic) 50.8%; ▌George H. Miller (Republican) 49.2%

== Montana ==
District	Incumbent			Results	Candidates
District	Senator	Party	First elected	Results	Candidates
Montana 1	Lee Metcalf	Democratic	1952	Incumbent re-elected.	▌ ✓ Lee Metcalf (Democratic) 62.1%; ▌Bill McDonald (Republican) 37.9%
Montana 2	Orvin B. Fjare	Republican	1954	Incumbent lost re-election. Democratic gain.	▌ ✓ LeRoy H. Anderson (Democratic) 50.9%; ▌Orvin B. Fjare (Republican) 49.1%

== Nebraska ==
District	Incumbent			Results	Candidates
District	Senator	Party	First elected	Results	Candidates
Nebraska 1	Phil Weaver	Republican	1954	Incumbent re-elected.	▌ ✓ Phil Weaver (Republican) 67.0%; ▌Samuel Freeman (Democratic) 33.0%
Nebraska 2	Jackson B. Chase	Republican	1954	Incumbent retired. Republican hold.	▌ ✓ Glenn Cunningham (Republican) 53.4%; ▌Joseph Benesch (Democratic) 45.0%; ▌Al Misegadis (Write-in) 1.7%
Nebraska 3	R. D. Harrison	Republican	1951 (special)	Incumbent re-elected.	▌ ✓ R. D. Harrison (Republican) 50.1%; ▌Lawrence Brock (Democratic) 49.9%
Nebraska 4	Arthur L. Miller	Republican	1942	Incumbent re-elected.	▌ ✓ Arthur L. Miller (Republican) 65.7%; ▌Carlton W. Laird (Democratic) 34.3%

== Nevada ==
District	Incumbent			Results	Candidates
District	Senator	Party	First elected	Results	Candidates
Nevada at-large	C. Clifton Young	Republican	1952	Incumbent retired to run for U. S. Senate. Democratic gain.	▌ ✓ Walter Baring (Democratic) 54.2%; ▌Richard W. Horton (Republican) 45.8%

== New Hampshire ==
District	Incumbent			Results	Candidates
District	Senator	Party	First elected	Results	Candidates
New Hampshire 1	Chester E. Merrow	Republican	1942	Incumbent re-elected.	▌ ✓ Chester E. Merrow (Republican) 57.4%; ▌James B. Sullivan (Democratic) 42.6%
New Hampshire 2	Perkins Bass	Republican	1954	Incumbent re-elected.	▌ ✓ Perkins Bass (Republican) 65.9%; ▌George F. Brown (Democratic) 34.1%

== New Jersey ==
District	Incumbent			Results	Candidates
District	Senator	Party	First elected	Results	Candidates
New Jersey 1	Charles A. Wolverton	Republican	1926	Incumbent re-elected.	▌ ✓ Charles A. Wolverton (Republican) 58.3%; ▌J. Frank Crawford (Democratic) 41.5%; ▌Bernardo S. Doganiero (Socialist Labor) 0.2%
New Jersey 2	T. Millet Hand	Republican	1944	Incumbent re-elected.	▌ ✓ T. Millet Hand (Republican) 67.8%; ▌Thomas C. Stewart (Democratic) 32.0%; ▌Morris Karp (Socialist Labor) 0.1%
New Jersey 3	James C. Auchincloss	Republican	1942	Incumbent re-elected.	▌ ✓ James C. Auchincloss (Republican) 65.3%; ▌Sidney Shiff (Democratic) 34.7%
New Jersey 4	Frank Thompson	Democratic	1954	Incumbent re-elected.	▌ ✓ Frank Thompson (Democratic) 54.5%; ▌William H. Wells (Republican) 45.5%
New Jersey 5	Peter Frelinghuysen Jr.	Republican	1952	Incumbent re-elected.	▌ ✓ Peter Frelinghuysen Jr. (Republican) 64.5%; ▌Francis C. Foley Jr. (Democratic) 35.4%; ▌Harry Press (Socialist Labor) 0.2%
New Jersey 6	Harrison A. Williams	Democratic	1953 (special)	Incumbent lost re-election. Republican gain.	▌ ✓ Florence P. Dwyer (Republican) 50.6%; ▌Harrison A. Williams (Democratic) 48.5%; ▌Ithamar Quigley (Prohibition) 0.9%
New Jersey 7	William B. Widnall	Republican	1950	Incumbent re-elected.	▌ ✓ William B. Widnall (Republican) 70.7%; ▌Daniel Amster (Democratic) 29.3%
New Jersey 8	Gordon Canfield	Republican	1940	Incumbent re-elected.	▌ ✓ Gordon Canfield (Republican) 60.8%; ▌Walter H. Gardner (Democratic) 38.7%; ▌Harry Santhouse (Socialist Labor) 0.4%; ▌Stephen Bell (American Third) 0.09%
New Jersey 9	Frank C. Osmers Jr.	Republican	1951 (special)	Incumbent re-elected.	▌ ✓ Frank C. Osmers Jr. (Republican) 67.8%; ▌Robert D. Gruen (Democratic) 31.9%; ▌Herman H. Rhael (Socialist Labor) 0.3%
New Jersey 10	Peter W. Rodino	Democratic	1948	Incumbent re-elected.	▌ ✓ Peter W. Rodino (Democratic) 56.1%; ▌G. George Addonzio (Republican) 43.9%
New Jersey 11	Hugh J. Addonizio	Democratic	1948	Incumbent re-elected.	▌ ✓ Hugh J. Addonizio (Democratic) 51.7%; ▌Chester K. Ligham (Republican) 46.8%; ▌William H. Smullen (American Conserv.) 1.5%
New Jersey 12	Robert Kean	Republican	1938	Incumbent re-elected.	▌ ✓ Robert Kean (Republican) 59.7%; ▌Irving L. Hodes (Democratic) 38.7%; ▌Winfred O. Perry (Conservative) 1.4%; ▌Daniel Roberts (Socialist Workers) 0.2%
New Jersey 13	Alfred Sieminski	Democratic	1950	Incumbent re-elected.	▌ ✓ Alfred Sieminski (Democratic) 45.0%; ▌Norman H. Roth (Republican) 44.9%; ▌Mortimer P. Cullity (Independent) 4.5%; ▌John F. Connelly (Independent) 3.4%; ▌Anthony J. Worosile (Independent) 1.8%; ▌Joseph H. Burgess (Independent) 0.4%
New Jersey 14	T. James Tumulty	Democratic	1954	Incumbent lost re-election. Republican gain.	▌ ✓ Vincent J. Dellay (Republican) 52.3%; ▌T. James Tumulty (Democratic) 45.6%; ▌John E. Walton (Independent) 2.1%

== New Mexico ==
District	Incumbent			Results	Candidates
District	Senator	Party	First elected	Results	Candidates
New Mexico at-large	John J. Dempsey	Democratic	1950	Incumbent re-elected.	▌ ✓ John J. Dempsey (Democratic) 26.7%; ▌ ✓ Antonio M. Fernández (Democratic) 26.4%; ▌Dudley Cornell (Republican) 23.6%; ▌Forrest S. Atchley (Republican) 23.2%
New Mexico at-large	Antonio M. Fernández	Democratic	1942	Incumbent re-elected.	▌ ✓ John J. Dempsey (Democratic) 26.7%; ▌ ✓ Antonio M. Fernández (Democratic) 26.4%; ▌Dudley Cornell (Republican) 23.6%; ▌Forrest S. Atchley (Republican) 23.2%

== New York ==
District	Incumbent			Results	Candidates
District	Senator	Party	First elected	Results	Candidates
New York 1	Stuyvesant Wainwright	Republican	1952	Incumbent re-elected.	▌ ✓ Stuyvesant Wainwright (Republican) 65.8%; ▌T. Bronson O'Reilly (Democratic) 34.2%
New York 2	Steven Derounian	Republican	1952	Incumbent re-elected.	▌ ✓ Steven Derounian (Republican) 67.5%; ▌Julius J. D'Amato (Democratic) 32.5%
New York 3	Frank J. Becker	Republican	1952	Incumbent re-elected.	▌ ✓ Frank J. Becker (Republican) 61.9%; ▌Francis X. Hardiman (Democratic) 38.1%
New York 4	Henry J. Latham	Republican	1944	Incumbent re-elected.	▌ ✓ Henry J. Latham (Republican) 55.8%; ▌Joseph J. Perrini (Democratic) 44.2%
New York 5	Albert H. Bosch	Republican	1952	Incumbent re-elected.	▌ ✓ Albert H. Bosch (Republican) 58.6%; ▌John J. Quinn (Democratic) 41.4%
New York 6	Lester Holtzman	Democratic	1952	Incumbent re-elected.	▌ ✓ Lester Holtzman (Democratic) 56.9%; ▌Albert H. Buschmann (Republican) 43.1%
New York 7	James J. Delaney	Democratic	1944; 1946 (lost); 1948	Incumbent re-elected.	▌ ✓ James J. Delaney (Democratic) 50.0%; ▌Joseph Stockinger (Republican) 50.0%
New York 8	Victor Anfuso	Democratic	1954	Incumbent re-elected.	▌ ✓ Victor Anfuso (Democratic) 65.6%; ▌Julius Reinlieb (Republican) 34.4%
New York 9	Eugene Keogh	Democratic	1936	Incumbent re-elected.	▌ ✓ Eugene Keogh (Democratic) 62.8%; ▌Benjamin W. Feldman (Republican) 37.2%
New York 10	Edna F. Kelly	Democratic	1949 (special)	Incumbent re-elected.	▌ ✓ Edna F. Kelly (Democratic) 73.2%; ▌Abraham Sher (Republican) 26.8%
New York 11	Emanuel Celler	Democratic	1922	Incumbent re-elected.	▌ ✓ Emanuel Celler (Democratic) 77.7%; ▌Henry D. Dorfman (Republican) 22.3%
New York 12	Francis E. Dorn	Republican	1952	Incumbent re-elected.	▌ ✓ Francis E. Dorn (Republican) 57.6%; ▌Donald L. O'Toole (Democratic) 42.4%
New York 13	Abraham J. Multer	Democratic	1947 (special)	Incumbent re-elected.	▌ ✓ Abraham J. Multer (Democratic) 71.2%; ▌Joseph Moriber (Republican) 28.8%
New York 14	John J. Rooney	Democratic	1944	Incumbent re-elected.	▌ ✓ John J. Rooney (Democratic) 64.2%; ▌Jacob P. Lefkowitz (Republican) 35.8%
New York 15	John H. Ray	Republican	1952	Incumbent re-elected.	▌ ✓ John H. Ray (Republican) 61.8%; ▌Ralph Di Iorio (Democratic) 38.2%
New York 16	Adam Clayton Powell Jr.	Democratic	1944	Incumbent re-elected.	▌ ✓ Adam Clayton Powell Jr. (Democratic) 69.7%; ▌Joseph A. Bailey (Republican) 19.9%; ▌Formington Taylor (Liberal) 10.3%
New York 17	Frederic Coudert Jr.	Republican	1946	Incumbent re-elected.	▌ ✓ Frederic Coudert Jr. (Republican) 50.9%; ▌Anthony B. Akers (Democratic) 49.1%
New York 18	James G. Donovan	Democratic	1950	Incumbent lost re-election as a Republican. Democratic hold.	▌ ✓ Alfred E. Santangelo (Democratic) 58.0%; ▌James G. Donovan (Republican) 42.0%
New York 19	Arthur George Klein	Democratic	1946	Incumbent retired to run for New York Supreme Court. Democratic hold.	▌ ✓ Leonard Farbstein (Democratic) 68.4%; ▌Maurice G. Henry Jr. (Republican) 31.6%
New York 20	Irwin D. Davidson	Democratic	1954	Incumbent retired to run for New York County Court of General Sessions. Democratic hold.	▌ ✓ Ludwig Teller (Democratic) 63.8%; ▌Milton H. Adler (Republican) 36.2%
New York 21	Herbert Zelenko	Democratic	1954	Incumbent re-elected.	▌ ✓ Herbert Zelenko (Democratic) 66.5%; ▌Dalton J. Shapo (Democratic) 33.5%
New York 22	James C. Healey	Democratic	February 7, 1956	Incumbent re-elected.	▌ ✓ James C. Healey (Democratic) 64.1%; ▌Henry Rose (Republican) 24.7%; ▌David I. Wells (Liberal) 11.2%
New York 23	Isidore Dollinger	Democratic	1948	Incumbent re-elected.	▌ ✓ Isidore Dollinger (Democratic) 68.5%; ▌Philip Myer (Republican) 21.9%; ▌Hyman Fromowitz (Liberal) 9.6%
New York 24	Charles A. Buckley	Democratic	1934	Incumbent re-elected.	▌ ✓ Charles A. Buckley (Democratic) 54.7%; ▌Harold Grosberg (Republican) 32.3%; ▌Elias Rosenblatt (Liberal) 13.0%
New York 25	Paul A. Fino	Republican	1952	Incumbent re-elected.	▌ ✓ Paul A. Fino (Republican) 59.4%; ▌Edward A. Cunningham (Democratic) 35.5%; ▌Bernard Tobacman (Liberal) 5.1%
New York 26	Ralph A. Gamble	Republican	1937 (special)	Incumbent retired. Republican hold.	▌ ✓ Edwin B. Dooley (Republican) 67.4%; ▌Julia L. Crews (Democratic) 32.6%
New York 27	Ralph W. Gwinn	Republican	1944	Incumbent re-elected.	▌ ✓ Ralph W. Gwinn (Republican) 58.1%; ▌William D. Carlebach (Democratic) 41.9%
New York 28	Katharine St. George	Republican	1946	Incumbent re-elected.	▌ ✓ Katharine St. George (Republican) 62.2%; ▌William H. Mauldin (Democratic) 37.8%
New York 29	J. Ernest Wharton	Republican	1950	Incumbent re-elected.	▌ ✓ J. Ernest Wharton (Republican) 71.4%; ▌Vincent di Gennaro (Democratic) 28.6%
New York 30	Leo W. O'Brien	Democratic	1952	Incumbent re-elected.	▌ ✓ Leo W. O'Brien (Democratic) 55.8%; ▌Robert E. Gray (Republican) 44.2%
New York 31	Dean P. Taylor	Republican	1942	Incumbent re-elected.	▌ ✓ Dean P. Taylor (Republican) 71.8%; ▌Theodore A. Knapp (Democratic) 28.2%
New York 32	Bernard W. Kearney	Republican	1942	Incumbent re-elected.	▌ ✓ Bernard W. Kearney (Republican) 67.5%; ▌R. Joseph Giblin (Democratic) 32.5%
New York 33	Clarence E. Kilburn	Republican	1940	Incumbent re-elected.	▌ ✓ Clarence E. Kilburn (Republican) 72.7%; ▌Louis C. Britton (Democratic) 27.3%
New York 34	William R. Williams	Republican	1950	Incumbent re-elected.	▌ ✓ William R. Williams (Republican) 57.5%; ▌Edwin L. Slusarczyk (Democratic) 42.5%
New York 35	R. Walter Riehlman	Republican	1946	Incumbent re-elected.	▌ ✓ R. Walter Riehlman (Republican) 67.0%; ▌Thomas J. Lowery (Democratic) 32.2%; ▌Benjamin Copley (American Labor) 0.8%
New York 36	John Taber	Republican	1922	Incumbent re-elected.	▌ ✓ John Taber (Republican) 69.6%; ▌Lewis S. Bell (Democratic) 30.4%
New York 37	W. Sterling Cole	Republican	1934	Incumbent re-elected.	▌ ✓ W. Sterling Cole (Republican) 71.6%; ▌Francis P. Hogan (Democratic) 28.4%
New York 38	Kenneth Keating	Republican	1946	Incumbent re-elected.	▌ ✓ Kenneth Keating (Republican) 71.7%; ▌Reed Harding (Democratic) 28.3%
New York 39	Harold C. Ostertag	Republican	1950	Incumbent re-elected.	▌ ✓ Harold C. Ostertag (Republican) 70.5%; ▌William H. Mostyn (Democratic) 29.5%
New York 40	William E. Miller	Republican	1950	Incumbent re-elected.	▌ ✓ William E. Miller (Republican) 64.3%; ▌A. Thorne Hills (Democratic) 35.7%
New York 41	Edmund P. Radwan	Republican	1950	Incumbent re-elected.	▌ ✓ Edmund P. Radwan (Republican) 64.4%; ▌Edward P. Jehle (Democratic) 35.6%
New York 42	John R. Pillion	Republican	1952	Incumbent re-elected.	▌ ✓ John R. Pillion (Republican) 58.7%; ▌James Kane Jr. (Democratic) 40.3%; ▌David E. Gundlach (Liberal) 1.0%
New York 43	Daniel A. Reed	Republican	1918	Incumbent re-elected.	▌ ✓ Daniel A. Reed (Republican) 68.7%; ▌T. Joseph Lynch (Democratic) 31.3%

== North Carolina ==
District	Incumbent			Results	Candidates
District	Senator	Party	First elected	Results	Candidates
North Carolina 1	Herbert C. Bonner	Democratic	1940	Incumbent re-elected.	▌ ✓ Herbert C. Bonner (Democratic) 88.6%; ▌Zeno O. Ratcliff (Republican) 11.4%
North Carolina 2	Lawrence H. Fountain	Democratic	1952	Incumbent re-elected.	▌ ✓ Lawrence H. Fountain (Democratic); Uncontested
North Carolina 3	Graham A. Barden	Democratic	1934	Incumbent re-elected.	▌ ✓ Graham A. Barden (Democratic) 78.8%; ▌Joe Reynolds (Republican) 21.2%
North Carolina 4	Harold D. Cooley	Democratic	1934	Incumbent re-elected.	▌ ✓ Harold D. Cooley (Democratic); Uncontested
North Carolina 5	R. Thurmond Chatham	Democratic	1948	Incumbent lost renomination. Democratic hold.	▌ ✓ Ralph James Scott (Democratic) 59.7%; ▌Joe New (Republican) 40.3%
North Carolina 6	Carl T. Durham	Democratic	1938	Incumbent re-elected.	▌ ✓ Carl T. Durham (Democratic); Uncontested
North Carolina 7	Frank Ertel Carlyle	Democratic	1948	Incumbent lost renomination. Democratic hold.	▌ ✓ Alton Lennon (Democratic) 84.0%; ▌C. Dana Malpass (Republican) 16.0%
North Carolina 8	Charles B. Deane	Democratic	1946	Incumbent lost renomination. Democratic hold.	▌ ✓ Alvin Paul Kitchin (Democratic) 59.5%; ▌Fred E. Myers (Republican) 40.5%
North Carolina 9	Hugh Quincy Alexander	Democratic	1952	Incumbent re-elected.	▌ ✓ Hugh Quincy Alexander (Democratic) 53.9%; ▌A. M. Miller (Republican) 46.1%
North Carolina 10	Charles R. Jonas	Republican	1952	Incumbent re-elected.	▌ ✓ Charles R. Jonas (Republican) 62.7%; ▌Ben E. Douglas (Democratic) 37.3%
North Carolina 11	Woodrow W. Jones	Democratic	1950	Incumbent retired. Democratic hold.	▌ ✓ Basil Lee Whitener (Democratic); Uncontested
North Carolina 12	George A. Shuford	Democratic	1952	Incumbent re-elected.	▌ ✓ George A. Shuford (Democratic) 54.5%; ▌Richard C. Clarke Jr. (Republican) 45.5%

== North Dakota ==
District	Incumbent			Results	Candidates
District	Senator	Party	First elected	Results	Candidates
North Dakota at-large	Usher L. Burdick	Republican-NPL	1948	Incumbent re-elected.	▌ ✓ Usher L. Burdick (Republican) 32.0%; ▌ ✓ Otto Krueger (Republican) 30.3%; ▌Agnes Geelan (Democratic-NPL) 19.1%; ▌S. B. Hocking (Democratic-NPL) 18.6%
North Dakota at-large	Otto Krueger	Republican	1952	Incumbent re-elected.	▌ ✓ Usher L. Burdick (Republican) 32.0%; ▌ ✓ Otto Krueger (Republican) 30.3%; ▌Agnes Geelan (Democratic-NPL) 19.1%; ▌S. B. Hocking (Democratic-NPL) 18.6%

== Ohio ==
District	Incumbent			Results	Candidates
District	Senator	Party	First elected	Results	Candidates
Ohio 1	Gordon H. Scherer	Republican	1952	Incumbent re-elected.	▌ ✓ Gordon H. Scherer (Republican) 64.7%; ▌Leonard D. Slutz (Democratic) 35.3%
Ohio 2	William E. Hess	Republican	1950	Incumbent re-elected.	▌ ✓ William E. Hess (Republican) 65.5%; ▌James T. Dewan (Democratic) 34.5%
Ohio 3	Paul F. Schenck	Republican	1951 (special)	Incumbent re-elected.	▌ ✓ Paul F. Schenck (Republican) 59.0%; ▌R. William Patterson (Democratic) 41.0%
Ohio 4	William McCulloch	Republican	1947 (special)	Incumbent re-elected.	▌ ✓ William McCulloch (Republican) 68.8%; ▌Ortha O. Barr Jr. (Democratic) 31.2%
Ohio 5	Cliff Clevenger	Republican	1938	Incumbent re-elected.	▌ ✓ Cliff Clevenger (Republican) 62.3%; ▌George E. Rafferty (Democratic) 37.7%
Ohio 6	James G. Polk	Democratic	1948	Incumbent re-elected.	▌ ✓ James G. Polk (Democratic) 54.5%; ▌Albert L. Daniels (Republican) 45.5%
Ohio 7	Clarence J. Brown	Republican	1938	Incumbent re-elected.	▌ ✓ Clarence J. Brown (Republican) 65.9%; ▌Joseph A. Sullivan (Democratic) 34.1%
Ohio 8	Jackson E. Betts	Republican	1950	Incumbent re-elected.	▌ ✓ Jackson E. Betts (Republican) 63.5%; ▌Robert M. Corry (Democratic) 36.5%
Ohio 9	Thomas L. Ashley	Democratic	1954	Incumbent re-elected.	▌ ✓ Thomas L. Ashley (Democratic) 55.2%; ▌Harvey G. Straub (Republican) 44.8%
Ohio 10	Thomas A. Jenkins	Republican	1924	Incumbent re-elected.	▌ ✓ Thomas A. Jenkins (Republican); Uncontested
Ohio 11	Oliver P. Bolton	Republican	1952	Incumbent retired. Republican hold.	▌ ✓ David S. Dennison Jr. (Republican) 58.4%; ▌James P. Bennett (Democratic) 41.6%
Ohio 12	John M. Vorys	Republican	1938	Incumbent re-elected.	▌ ✓ John M. Vorys (Republican) 61.8%; ▌Walter J. Shapter Jr. (Democratic) 38.2%
Ohio 13	A. David Baumhart Jr.	Republican	1954	Incumbent re-elected.	▌ ✓ A. David Baumhart Jr. (Republican) 70.7%; ▌J. P. Henderson (Democratic) 29.3%
Ohio 14	William H. Ayres	Republican	1950	Incumbent re-elected.	▌ ✓ William H. Ayres (Republican) 58.9%; ▌Bernard Rosen (Democratic) 41.1%
Ohio 15	John E. Henderson	Republican	1954	Incumbent re-elected.	▌ ✓ John E. Henderson (Republican) 60.5%; ▌Herbert U. Smith (Democratic) 39.5%
Ohio 16	Frank T. Bow	Republican	1950	Incumbent re-elected.	▌ ✓ Frank T. Bow (Republican) 55.2%; ▌John McSweeney (Democratic) 44.8%
Ohio 17	J. Harry McGregor	Republican	1940	Incumbent re-elected.	▌ ✓ J. Harry McGregor (Republican) 66.5%; ▌Robert W. Levering (Democratic) 33.5%
Ohio 18	Wayne Hays	Democratic	1948	Incumbent re-elected.	▌ ✓ Wayne Hays (Democratic) 59.6%; ▌Joseph Miller (Republican) 40.4%
Ohio 19	Michael J. Kirwan	Democratic	1936	Incumbent re-elected.	▌ ✓ Michael J. Kirwan (Democratic) 68.7%; ▌Ralph E. Turner (Republican) 31.3%
Ohio 20	Michael A. Feighan	Democratic	1942	Incumbent re-elected.	▌ ✓ Michael A. Feighan (Democratic) 65.3%; ▌John H. Ferguson (Republican) 34.7%
Ohio 21	Charles Vanik	Democratic	1954	Incumbent re-elected.	▌ ✓ Charles Vanik (Democratic) 71.6%; ▌Charles H. Loeb (Republican) 28.4%
Ohio 22	Frances P. Bolton	Republican	1940	Incumbent re-elected.	▌ ✓ Frances P. Bolton (Republican) 66.7%; ▌Harry A. Blachman (Democratic) 33.3%
Ohio 23	William E. Minshall Jr.	Republican	1954	Incumbent re-elected.	▌ ✓ William E. Minshall Jr. (Republican) 69.0%; ▌George A. Hurley (Democratic) 31.0%

== Oklahoma ==
District	Incumbent			Results	Candidates
District	Senator	Party	First elected	Results	Candidates
Oklahoma 1	Page Belcher	Republican	1950	Incumbent re-elected.	▌ ✓ Page Belcher (Republican) 57.2%; ▌Harry B. Moreland (Democratic) 42.8%
Oklahoma 2	Ed Edmondson	Democratic	1952	Incumbent re-elected.	▌ ✓ Ed Edmondson (Democratic) 60.2%; ▌Percy Butler (Republican) 39.8%
Oklahoma 3	Carl Albert	Democratic	1946	Incumbent re-elected.	▌ ✓ Carl Albert (Democratic) 76.5%; ▌Chapin Wallace (Republican) 23.0%; ▌John R. Patrick (Independent) 0.5%
Oklahoma 4	Tom Steed	Democratic	1948	Incumbent re-elected.	▌ ✓ Tom Steed (Democratic) 61.1%; ▌Harold H. Potter (Republican) 38.9%
Oklahoma 5	John Jarman	Democratic	1950	Incumbent re-elected.	▌ ✓ John Jarman (Democratic) 63.7%; ▌Hobart H. Hobbs (Republican) 36.3%
Oklahoma 6	Victor Wickersham	Democratic	1948	Incumbent lost renomination. Democratic hold.	▌ ✓ Toby Morris (Democratic) 68.9%; ▌Fred L. Coogan (Republican) 31.1%

== Oregon ==
District	Incumbent			Results	Candidates
District	Senator	Party	First elected	Results	Candidates
Oregon 1	A. Walter Norblad	Republican	1946	Incumbent re-elected.	▌ ✓ A. Walter Norblad (Republican) 54.7%; ▌Jason Lee (Democratic) 45.3%
Oregon 2	Sam Coon	Republican	1952	Incumbent lost re-election. Democratic gain.	▌ ✓ Al Ullman (Democratic) 50.7%; ▌Sam Coon (Republican) 49.3%
Oregon 3	Edith Green	Democratic	1954	Incumbent re-elected.	▌ ✓ Edith Green (Democratic) 61.6%; ▌Phil J. Roth (Republican) 38.4%
Oregon 4	Harris Ellsworth	Republican	1942	Incumbent lost re-election. Democratic gain.	▌ ✓ Charles O. Porter (Democratic) 51.3%; ▌Harris Ellsworth (Republican) 48.7%

== Pennsylvania ==
District	Incumbent			Results	Candidates
District	Senator	Party	First elected	Results	Candidates
Pennsylvania 1	William A. Barrett	Democratic	1944; 1946 (lost); 1948	Incumbent re-elected.	▌ ✓ William A. Barrett (Democratic) 62.7%; ▌A. J. Cammarota (Republican) 37.3%
Pennsylvania 2	Vacant			William T. Granahan (D) died May 25, 1956. Democratic hold. Winner was also elected to finish the term; see above.	▌ ✓ Kathryn E. Granahan (Democratic) 61.89%; ▌Robert F. Frankenfield (Republican) 38.11%
Pennsylvania 3	James A. Byrne	Democratic	1952	Incumbent re-elected.	▌ ✓ James A. Byrne (Democratic) 59.9%; ▌Charles H. Sporkin (Republican) 40.1%
Pennsylvania 4	Earl Chudoff	Democratic	1948	Incumbent re-elected.	▌ ✓ Earl Chudoff (Democratic) 69.1%; ▌Horace C. Scott (Republican) 30.9%
Pennsylvania 5	William J. Green Jr.	Democratic	1948	Incumbent re-elected.	▌ ✓ William J. Green Jr. (Democratic) 53.3%; ▌James J. Schissler (Republican) 46.7%
Pennsylvania 6	Hugh Scott	Republican	1946	Incumbent re-elected.	▌ ✓ Hugh Scott (Republican) 51.5%; ▌Herbert J. McGlinchey (Democratic) 48.5%
Pennsylvania 7	Benjamin F. James	Republican	1948	Incumbent re-elected.	▌ ✓ Benjamin F. James (Republican) 61.9%; ▌William A. Welsh (Democratic) 38.1%
Pennsylvania 8	Karl C. King	Republican	1951 (special)	Incumbent retired. Republican hold.	▌ ✓ Willard S. Curtin (Republican) 55.9%; ▌John P. Fullam (Democratic) 44.1%
Pennsylvania 9	Paul B. Dague	Republican	1946	Incumbent re-elected.	▌ ✓ Paul B. Dague (Republican) 68.4%; ▌Edward G. Wilson (Democratic) 31.6%
Pennsylvania 10	Joseph L. Carrigg	Republican	1951 (special)	Incumbent re-elected.	▌ ✓ Joseph L. Carrigg (Republican) 55.8%; ▌Jerome P. Casey (Democratic) 44.2%
Pennsylvania 11	Daniel Flood	Democratic	1944; 1946 (lost); 1948; 1952 (lost); 1954	Incumbent re-elected.	▌ ✓ Daniel Flood (Democratic) 53.1%; ▌Enoch H. Thomas Jr. (Republican) 46.9%
Pennsylvania 12	Ivor D. Fenton	Republican	1938	Incumbent re-elected.	▌ ✓ Ivor D. Fenton (Republican) 56.5%; ▌George G. Lindsay (Democratic) 43.5%
Pennsylvania 13	Samuel K. McConnell Jr.	Republican	1944	Incumbent re-elected.	▌ ✓ Samuel K. McConnell Jr. (Republican) 66.7%; ▌Alfred M. Klein (Democratic) 33.3%
Pennsylvania 14	George M. Rhodes	Democratic	1948	Incumbent re-elected.	▌ ✓ George M. Rhodes (Democratic) 51.3%; ▌Thomas K. Leinbach (Republican) 48.4%; ▌Birch Wilson (Socialist) 0.3%
Pennsylvania 15	Francis E. Walter	Democratic	1932	Incumbent re-elected.	▌ ✓ Francis E. Walter (Democratic) 55.6%; ▌George M. Berg (Republican) 44.4%
Pennsylvania 16	Walter M. Mumma	Republican	1950	Incumbent re-elected.	▌ ✓ Walter M. Mumma (Republican) 60.5%; ▌Guy J. Swope (Democratic) 39.5%
Pennsylvania 17	Alvin Bush	Republican	1950	Incumbent re-elected.	▌ ✓ Alvin Bush (Republican) 58.6%; ▌Dean R. Fisher (Democratic) 41.4%
Pennsylvania 18	Richard M. Simpson	Republican	1937 (special)	Incumbent re-elected.	▌ ✓ Richard M. Simpson (Republican) 59.9%; ▌Ross E. Hershberger (Democratic) 40.1%
Pennsylvania 19	James M. Quigley	Democratic	1954	Incumbent lost re-election. Republican gain.	▌ ✓ S. Walter Stauffer (Republican) 53.8%; ▌James M. Quigley (Democratic) 46.2%
Pennsylvania 20	James E. Van Zandt	Republican	1946	Incumbent re-elected.	▌ ✓ James E. Van Zandt (Republican) 63.0%; ▌John R. Stewart (Democratic) 37.0%
Pennsylvania 21	Augustine B. Kelley	Democratic	1940	Incumbent re-elected.	▌ ✓ Augustine B. Kelley (Democratic) 56.8%; ▌Herbert O. Morrison (Republican) 43.2%
Pennsylvania 22	John P. Saylor	Republican	1949 (special)	Incumbent re-elected.	▌ ✓ John P. Saylor (Republican) 56.9%; ▌Joseph C. Dolan (Democratic) 43.1%
Pennsylvania 23	Leon H. Gavin	Republican	1942	Incumbent re-elected.	▌ ✓ Leon H. Gavin (Republican) 66.1%; ▌Grace M. Sloan (Democratic) 33.9%
Pennsylvania 24	Carroll D. Kearns	Republican	1946	Incumbent re-elected.	▌ ✓ Carroll D. Kearns (Republican) 57.8%; ▌William D. Thomas (Democratic) 42.2%
Pennsylvania 25	Frank M. Clark	Democratic	1954	Incumbent re-elected.	▌ ✓ Frank M. Clark (Democratic) 51.3%; ▌Sidney L. Lockley (Republican) 48.7%
Pennsylvania 26	Thomas E. Morgan	Democratic	1944	Incumbent re-elected.	▌ ✓ Thomas E. Morgan (Democratic) 61.9%; ▌I. Willits McCaskey (Republican) 38.1%
Pennsylvania 27	James G. Fulton	Republican	1944	Incumbent re-elected.	▌ ✓ James G. Fulton (Republican) 66.0%; ▌Kenneth L. Stilley (Democratic) 34.0%
Pennsylvania 28	Herman P. Eberharter	Democratic	1936	Incumbent re-elected.	▌ ✓ Herman P. Eberharter (Democratic) 57.8%; ▌Richard C. Witt (Republican) 42.2%
Pennsylvania 29	Bob Corbett	Republican	1938; 1940 (lost); 1944	Incumbent re-elected.	▌ ✓ Bob Corbett (Republican) 64.7%; ▌Joseph A. Guerrier (Democratic) 35.3%
Pennsylvania 30	Elmer J. Holland	Democratic	1942 (special); 1942 (retired); 1956 (special)	Incumbent re-elected.	▌ ✓ Elmer J. Holland (Democratic) 59.8%; ▌Ross V. Walker (Republican) 40.2%

== Rhode Island ==
District	Incumbent			Results	Candidates
District	Senator	Party	First elected	Results	Candidates
Rhode Island 1	Aime Forand	Democratic	1940	Incumbent re-elected.	▌ ✓ Aime Forand (Democratic) 56.0%; ▌Samuel H. Ramsay (Republican) 44.0%
Rhode Island 2	John E. Fogarty	Democratic	1940	Incumbent re-elected.	▌ ✓ John E. Fogarty (Democratic) 52.2%; ▌Thomas H. Needham (Republican) 47.8%

== South Carolina ==
District	Incumbent			Results	Candidates
District	Senator	Party	First elected	Results	Candidates
South Carolina 1	L. Mendel Rivers	Democratic	1940	Incumbent re-elected.	▌ ✓ L. Mendel Rivers (Democratic); Uncontested
South Carolina 2	John J. Riley	Democratic	1950	Incumbent re-elected.	▌ ✓ John J. Riley (Democratic); Uncontested
South Carolina 3	William Jennings Bryan Dorn	Democratic	1946; 1948 (retired); 1950	Incumbent re-elected.	▌ ✓ William Jennings Bryan Dorn (Democratic) 93.2%; ▌Maka Knox (Republican) 6.8%
South Carolina 4	Robert T. Ashmore	Democratic	1953 (special)	Incumbent re-elected.	▌ ✓ Robert T. Ashmore (Democratic) 85.1%; ▌Dan H. Wallace Jr. (Republican) 14.9%
South Carolina 5	James P. Richards	Democratic	1932	Incumbent retired. Democratic hold.	▌ ✓ Robert W. Hemphill (Democratic); Uncontested
South Carolina 6	John L. McMillan	Democratic	1938	Incumbent re-elected.	▌ ✓ John L. McMillan (Democratic); Uncontested

== South Dakota ==
District	Incumbent			Results	Candidates
District	Senator	Party	First elected	Results	Candidates
South Dakota 1	Harold Lovre	Republican	1948	Incumbent lost re-election. Democratic gain.	▌ ✓ George McGovern (Democratic) 52.4%; ▌Harold Lovre (Republican) 47.6%
South Dakota 2	E. Y. Berry	Republican	1950	Incumbent re-elected.	▌ ✓ E. Y. Berry (Republican) 55.9%; ▌Tom Eastman Jr. (Democratic) 44.1%

== Tennessee ==
District	Incumbent			Results	Candidates
District	Senator	Party	First elected	Results	Candidates
Tennessee 1	B. Carroll Reece	Republican	1950	Incumbent re-elected.	▌ ✓ B. Carroll Reece (Republican) 72.1%; ▌Arthur W. Bright (Democratic) 27.8%; ▌R. G. Duvaney (Independent) 0.01%
Tennessee 2	Howard Baker Sr.	Republican	1950	Incumbent re-elected.	▌ ✓ Howard Baker Sr. (Republican) 100.0%; ▌R. G. Crossno (Independent) 0.001%
Tennessee 3	James B. Frazier Jr.	Democratic	1948	Incumbent re-elected.	▌ ✓ James B. Frazier Jr. (Democratic) 53.7%; ▌P. H. Woods (Republican) 46.3%
Tennessee 4	Joe L. Evins	Democratic	1946	Incumbent re-elected.	▌ ✓ Joe L. Evins (Democratic) 98.4%; ▌Joe Smith (Republican) 1.6%; ▌Jack D. Walker (Independent) 0.002%
Tennessee 5	Vacant			Percy Priest (D) died October 12, 1956. Democratic hold.	▌ ✓ J. Carlton Loser (Democratic) 74.5%; ▌George Spence (Republican) 25.5%
Tennessee 6	Ross Bass	Democratic	1954	Incumbent re-elected.	▌ ✓ Ross Bass (Democratic); Uncontested
Tennessee 7	Tom J. Murray	Democratic	1942	Incumbent re-elected.	▌ ✓ Tom J. Murray (Democratic); Uncontested
Tennessee 8	Jere Cooper	Democratic	1928	Incumbent re-elected.	▌ ✓ Jere Cooper (Democratic); Uncontested
Tennessee 9	Clifford Davis	Democratic	1940	Incumbent re-elected.	▌ ✓ Clifford Davis (Democratic) 71.7%; ▌Herbert L. Harper (Republican) 28.3%; ▌Robert Dobbs (Independent) 0.003%; ▌Joseph Marsh (Independent) 0.001%

== Texas ==
District	Incumbent			Results	Candidates
District	Senator	Party	First elected	Results	Candidates
Texas 1	Wright Patman	Democratic	1928	Incumbent re-elected.	▌ ✓ Wright Patman (Democratic); Uncontested
Texas 2	Jack Brooks	Democratic	1952	Incumbent re-elected.	▌ ✓ Jack Brooks (Democratic); Uncontested
Texas 3	Brady P. Gentry	Democratic	1952	Incumbent retired. Democratic hold.	▌ ✓ Lindley Beckworth (Democratic) 83.5%; ▌R. E. Kennedy (Republican) 16.5%
Texas 4	Sam Rayburn	Democratic	1912	Incumbent re-elected.	▌ ✓ Sam Rayburn (Democratic); Uncontested
Texas 5	Bruce Alger	Republican	1954	Incumbent re-elected.	▌ ✓ Bruce Alger (Republican) 55.6%; ▌Henry Wade (Democratic) 44.4%
Texas 6	Olin E. Teague	Democratic	1946	Incumbent re-elected.	▌ ✓ Olin E. Teague (Democratic); Uncontested
Texas 7	John Dowdy	Democratic	1952	Incumbent re-elected.	▌ ✓ John Dowdy (Democratic); Uncontested
Texas 8	Albert Thomas	Democratic	1936	Incumbent re-elected.	▌ ✓ Albert Thomas (Democratic) 60.4%; ▌C. Anthony Friloux Jr. (Republican) 38.0%; ▌W. C. Miller (Constitution) 1.6%
Texas 9	Clark W. Thompson	Democratic	1947 (special)	Incumbent re-elected.	▌ ✓ Clark W. Thompson (Democratic); Uncontested
Texas 10	Homer Thornberry	Democratic	1948	Incumbent re-elected.	▌ ✓ Homer Thornberry (Democratic); Uncontested
Texas 11	William R. Poage	Democratic	1936	Incumbent re-elected.	▌ ✓ William R. Poage (Democratic); Uncontested
Texas 12	Jim Wright	Democratic	1954	Incumbent re-elected.	▌ ✓ Jim Wright (Democratic); Uncontested
Texas 13	Frank N. Ikard	Democratic	1951 (special)	Incumbent re-elected.	▌ ✓ Frank N. Ikard (Democratic); Uncontested
Texas 14	John J. Bell	Democratic	1954	Incumbent lost renomination. Democratic hold.	▌ ✓ John Young (Democratic) 87.3%; ▌Olive B. Stichter (Republican) 12.7%
Texas 15	Joe M. Kilgore	Democratic	1954	Incumbent re-elected.	▌ ✓ Joe M. Kilgore (Democratic); Uncontested
Texas 16	J. T. Rutherford	Democratic	1954	Incumbent re-elected.	▌ ✓ J. T. Rutherford (Democratic) 64.6%; ▌Charles H. Gibson (Republican) 35.4%
Texas 17	Omar Burleson	Democratic	1946	Incumbent re-elected.	▌ ✓ Omar Burleson (Democratic); Uncontested
Texas 18	Walter E. Rogers	Democratic	1950	Incumbent re-elected.	▌ ✓ Walter E. Rogers (Democratic); Uncontested
Texas 19	George H. Mahon	Democratic	1934	Incumbent re-elected.	▌ ✓ George H. Mahon (Democratic); Uncontested
Texas 20	Paul J. Kilday	Democratic	1938	Incumbent re-elected.	▌ ✓ Paul J. Kilday (Democratic); Uncontested
Texas 21	O. C. Fisher	Democratic	1942	Incumbent re-elected.	▌ ✓ O. C. Fisher (Democratic); Uncontested
Texas at-large	Martin Dies Jr.	Democratic	1952	Incumbent re-elected.	▌ ✓ Martin Dies Jr. (Democratic) 98.5%; ▌Fred T. Spangler (Constitution) 1.5%

== Utah ==
District	Incumbent			Results	Candidates
District	Senator	Party	First elected	Results	Candidates
Utah 1	Henry Aldous Dixon	Republican	1954	Incumbent re-elected.	▌ ✓ Henry Aldous Dixon (Republican) 60.9%; ▌Carlyle F. Gronning (Democratic) 39.1%
Utah 2	William A. Dawson	Republican	1952	Incumbent re-elected.	▌ ✓ William A. Dawson (Republican) 57.6%; ▌Oscar W. McConkie Jr. (Democratic) 42.4%

== Vermont ==
District	Incumbent			Results	Candidates
District	Senator	Party	First elected	Results	Candidates
Vermont at-large	Winston L. Prouty	Republican	1950	Incumbent re-elected.	▌ ✓ Winston L. Prouty (Republican) 67.1%; ▌Camille E. St. Amour (Democratic) 32.9%

== Virginia ==
District	Incumbent			Results	Candidates
District	Senator	Party	First elected	Results	Candidates
Virginia 1	Edward J. Robeson Jr.	Democratic	1950	Incumbent re-elected.	▌ ✓ Edward J. Robeson Jr. (Democratic) 50.8%; ▌Horace E. Henderson (Republican) 49.2%
Virginia 2	Porter Hardy Jr.	Democratic	1946	Incumbent re-elected.	▌ ✓ Porter Hardy Jr. (Democratic) 76.4%; ▌William R. Burns (Republican) 23.6%
Virginia 3	J. Vaughan Gary	Democratic	1945 (special)	Incumbent re-elected.	▌ ✓ J. Vaughan Gary (Democratic) 59.1%; ▌Royal E. Cabell Jr. (Republican) 40.9%
Virginia 4	Watkins Abbitt	Democratic	1948	Incumbent re-elected.	▌ ✓ Watkins Abbitt (Democratic); Uncontested
Virginia 5	William M. Tuck	Democratic	1953 (special)	Incumbent re-elected.	▌ ✓ William M. Tuck (Democratic) 67.4%; ▌Jackson L. Kiser (Republican) 32.6%
Virginia 6	Dick Poff	Republican	1952	Incumbent re-elected.	▌ ✓ Dick Poff (Republican) 62.1%; ▌John L. Whitehead (Democratic) 37.6%; ▌J. B. Brayman (Social Democratic) 0.3%
Virginia 7	Burr Harrison	Democratic	1946	Incumbent re-elected.	▌ ✓ Burr Harrison (Democratic) 69.0%; ▌A. R. Dunning (Republican) 31.0%
Virginia 8	Howard W. Smith	Democratic	1930	Incumbent re-elected.	▌ ✓ Howard W. Smith (Democratic) 67.3%; ▌Horace B. Clay (Republican) 32.7%
Virginia 9	W. Pat Jennings	Democratic	1954	Incumbent re-elected.	▌ ✓ W. Pat Jennings (Democratic) 54.1%; ▌William C. Wampler (Republican) 45.9%
Virginia 10	Joel Broyhill	Republican	1952	Incumbent re-elected.	▌ ✓ Joel Broyhill (Republican) 56.2%; ▌Warren D. Quenstedt (Democratic) 42.9%; ▌Richard O. Read (Independent) 0.9%

== Washington ==
District	Incumbent			Results	Candidates
District	Senator	Party	First elected	Results	Candidates
Washington 1	Thomas Pelly	Republican	1952	Incumbent re-elected.	▌ ✓ Thomas Pelly (Republican) 58.1%; ▌James B. Wilson (Democratic) 41.9%
Washington 2	Jack Westland	Republican	1952	Incumbent re-elected.	▌ ✓ Jack Westland (Republican) 56.0%; ▌Payson Peterson (Democratic) 44.0%
Washington 3	Russell V. Mack	Republican	1947 (special)	Incumbent re-elected.	▌ ✓ Russell V. Mack (Republican) 56.5%; ▌Al McCoy (Democratic) 43.5%
Washington 4	Hal Holmes	Republican	1942	Incumbent re-elected.	▌ ✓ Hal Holmes (Republican) 50.4%; ▌Frank LeRoux (Democratic) 49.6%
Washington 5	Walt Horan	Republican	1942	Incumbent re-elected.	▌ ✓ Walt Horan (Republican) 53.8%; ▌Tom Delaney (Democratic) 46.2%
Washington 6	Thor C. Tollefson	Republican	1946	Incumbent re-elected.	▌ ✓ Thor C. Tollefson (Republican) 54.0%; ▌John T. McCutcheon (Democratic) 46.0%
Washington at-large	Don Magnuson	Democratic	1952	Incumbent re-elected.	▌ ✓ Don Magnuson (Democratic) 58.5%; ▌Philip Evans (Republican) 41.5%

== West Virginia ==
District	Incumbent			Results	Candidates
District	Senator	Party	First elected	Results	Candidates
West Virginia 1	Bob Mollohan	Democratic	1952	Retired to run for Governor of West Virginia. Republican gain.	▌ ✓ Arch A. Moore Jr. (Republican) 50.3%; ▌C. Lee Spillers (Democratic) 49.7%
West Virginia 2	Harley O. Staggers	Democratic	1948	Incumbent re-elected.	▌ ✓ Harley O. Staggers (Democratic) 52.4%; ▌Mary Elkins (Republican) 47.6%
West Virginia 3	Cleveland M. Bailey	Democratic	1948	Incumbent re-elected.	▌ ✓ Cleveland M. Bailey (Democratic) 51.5%; ▌Daniel L. Louchery (Republican) 48.5%
West Virginia 4	Maurice G. Burnside	Democratic	1954	Incumbent lost re-election. Republican gain.	▌ ✓ Will E. Neal (Republican) 52.8%; ▌Maurice G. Burnside (Democratic) 47.2%
West Virginia 5	Elizabeth Kee	Democratic	1951 (special)	Incumbent re-elected.	▌ ✓ Elizabeth Kee (Democratic) 60.7%; ▌William H. Sanders (Republican) 39.3%
West Virginia 6	Robert Byrd	Democratic	1952	Incumbent re-elected.	▌ ✓ Robert Byrd (Democratic) 57.4%; ▌Cleo C. Jones (Republican) 42.6%

== Wisconsin ==
District	Incumbent			Results	Candidates
District	Senator	Party	First elected	Results	Candidates
Wisconsin 1	Lawrence H. Smith	Republican	1941 (special)	Incumbent re-elected.	▌ ✓ Lawrence H. Smith (Republican) 57.1%; ▌Gerald T. Flynn (Democratic) 42.9%
Wisconsin 2	Glenn Robert Davis	Republican	1947 (special)	Retired to run for U. S. Senate. Republican hold.	▌ ✓ Donald E. Tewes (Republican) 55.3%; ▌Robert Kastenmeier (Democratic) 44.7%
Wisconsin 3	Gardner R. Withrow	Republican	1948	Incumbent re-elected.	▌ ✓ Gardner R. Withrow (Republican) 61.2%; ▌Norman M. Clapp (Democratic) 38.8%
Wisconsin 4	Clement Zablocki	Democratic	1948	Incumbent re-elected.	▌ ✓ Clement Zablocki (Democratic) 65.7%; ▌William J. Burke (Republican) 34.3%
Wisconsin 5	Henry S. Reuss	Democratic	1954	Incumbent re-elected.	▌ ✓ Henry S. Reuss (Democratic) 57.8%; ▌Russell Wirth Jr. (Republican) 42.2%
Wisconsin 6	William Van Pelt	Republican	1950	Incumbent re-elected.	▌ ✓ William Van Pelt (Republican) 67.2%; ▌Rudolph J. Ploetz (Democratic) 32.8%
Wisconsin 7	Melvin Laird	Republican	1952	Incumbent re-elected.	▌ ✓ Melvin Laird (Republican) 61.8%; ▌Margaret Anderson (Democratic) 38.2%
Wisconsin 8	John W. Byrnes	Republican	1944	Incumbent re-elected.	▌ ✓ John W. Byrnes (Republican) 64.6%; ▌Milo Singler (Democratic) 35.4%
Wisconsin 9	Lester Johnson	Democratic	1953 (special)	Incumbent re-elected.	▌ ✓ Lester Johnson (Democratic) 51.4%; ▌Arthur L. Peterson (Republican) 48.6%
Wisconsin 10	Alvin O'Konski	Republican	1942	Incumbent re-elected.	▌ ✓ Alvin O'Konski (Republican) 64.5%; ▌Carl E. Lauri (Democratic) 35.5%

== Wyoming ==
District	Incumbent			Results	Candidates
District	Senator	Party	First elected	Results	Candidates
Wyoming at-large	Keith Thomson	Republican	1954	Incumbent re-elected.	▌ ✓ Keith Thomson (Republican) 58.2%; ▌Jerry A. O'Callaghan (Democratic) 41.8%

== Non-voting delegates ==
=== Alaska Territory ===
District	Incumbent			This race	
District	Representative	Party	First elected	Results	Candidates
Alaska Territory at-large	Bob Bartlett	Democratic	1944	Incumbent re-elected.	▌ ✓ Bob Bartlett (Democratic) 67.0%; ▌Byron A. Gillam (Republican) 33.0%

=== Hawaii Territory ===
District	Incumbent			This race	
District	Member	Party	First elected	Results	Candidates
Hawaii Territory at-large	Elizabeth P. Farrington	Republican	1954	Incumbent lost re-election. Democratic gain.	▌ ✓ John A. Burns (Democratic) 55.18%; ▌Elizabeth P. Farrington (Republican) 44.82%

== See also ==
- 1956 United States elections
  - 1956 United States Senate elections
  - 1956 United States presidential election
  - 1956 United States gubernatorial elections
- 84th United States Congress
- 85th United States Congress

== Works cited ==
- Abramson, Paul; Aldrich, John; Rohde, David (1995). Change and Continuity in the 1992 Elections. CQ Press. ISBN 0871878399.
