= Fred Biermann =

American politician (1884–1968)

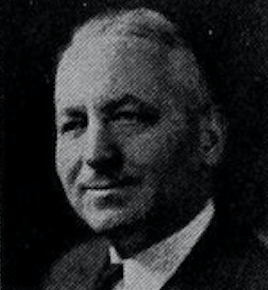

Member of the U.S. House of Representatives from Iowa's 4th District
- In office March 4, 1933 – January 3, 1939
- Preceded by: Gilbert N. Haugen
- Succeeded by: Henry O. Talle

Personal details
- Born: Frederick Elliott Biermann; March 20, 1884 Rochester, Minnesota, U.S.
- Died: July 1, 1968 (aged 84) La Crosse, Wisconsin, U.S.
- Party: Democratic
- Education: Columbia University

Military service
- Allegiance: United States of America
- Branch/service: United States Army
- Years of service: April 1917–June 1919
- Rank: First lieutenant
- Unit: 88th Infantry Division
- Battles/wars: World War I

Frederick Elliott Biermann (March 20, 1884 – July 1, 1968) was an American politician who was a three-term Democratic U.S. Representative from Iowa's 4th congressional district. Elected as part of the 1932 Roosevelt landslide, he was defeated when running for a fourth term by an opponent from his own small community of Decorah, Iowa.

== Personal background ==
Born in Rochester, Minnesota in 1884, Biermann moved to Decorah four years later, following his mother's death, to live with an aunt. After graduating from Decorah High School in 1901, he attended the University of Minnesota in Minneapolis for three years before transferring to Columbia University in New York City, where he graduated in 1905. He wrote his senior thesis on "Jefferson and Jackson as Leaders of the Democracy" at Columbia. He returned to Decorah and taught at Valder's Business College. He homesteaded in Morton County, North Dakota, then attended Harvard Law School in 1906 and 1907, before returning to Decorah the following year to become half-owner of the Decorah Journal. He became the sole owner in 1911. Starting in 1913, he also served as Decorah's postmaster.

His service as editor and postmaster was interrupted when he volunteered for service in the U.S. Army during the First World War. He was commissioned as a second lieutenant and then as a first lieutenant in the 88th Infantry Division. He served from April 1917 until June 1919, including ten months overseas.

After the war, he continued to serve as postmaster (until 1923) and editor and publisher of the Journal. In the 1920s his editorials and speeches were often repeated and critiqued on the editorial pages of other area newspapers, such as the Mason City Globe-Gazette and the Oelwein Daily Register. When he sold the Journal in 1931, he explained that burns he had received nine years earlier in an X-ray accident had crippled him.

== Political service ==
During the 1920s, Biermann was actively involved in the Democratic Party, serving on the Central Committee of the Iowa Democratic Party for eight years, and as delegate to the Democratic National Convention in 1928.

In March 1932 Biermann announced his candidacy for the U.S. House seat in Iowa's 4th congressional district, then held by the longest-serving member of Congress, sixteen-term Republican Gilbert N. Haugen. As part of the Roosevelt landslide, Biermann won by over 20,000 votes.

Biermann won the next two elections, but by increasingly narrow margins. His adversary in 1936 was Henry O. Talle, a professor of economics at Luther College in Decorah. While Biermann defeated Talle that year, two years later (as part of a Republican sweep of all but two U.S. House seats) Talle defeated Biermann by over 4,000 votes.

Biermann's Congressional service, which began March 4, 1933, ended on January 3, 1939. As a congressman, Biermann served as delegate to the Interparliamentary Union Conference at Paris in 1937.

== After Congress ==
Biermann was appointed United States Marshal for northern Iowa in October 1940, in which capacity he served until 1953.

He was also a delegate to Democratic National Conventions in 1940 and 1956.

He died in La Crosse, Wisconsin, on July 1, 1968. He was interred in Phelps Cemetery, in Decorah.

U.S. House of Representatives
Preceded by Gilbert N. Haugen	Member of the U.S. House of Representatives from Iowa's 4th congressional district 1933–1939	Succeeded by Henry O. Talle
