= Gilbert N. Haugen =

American politician (1859–1933)

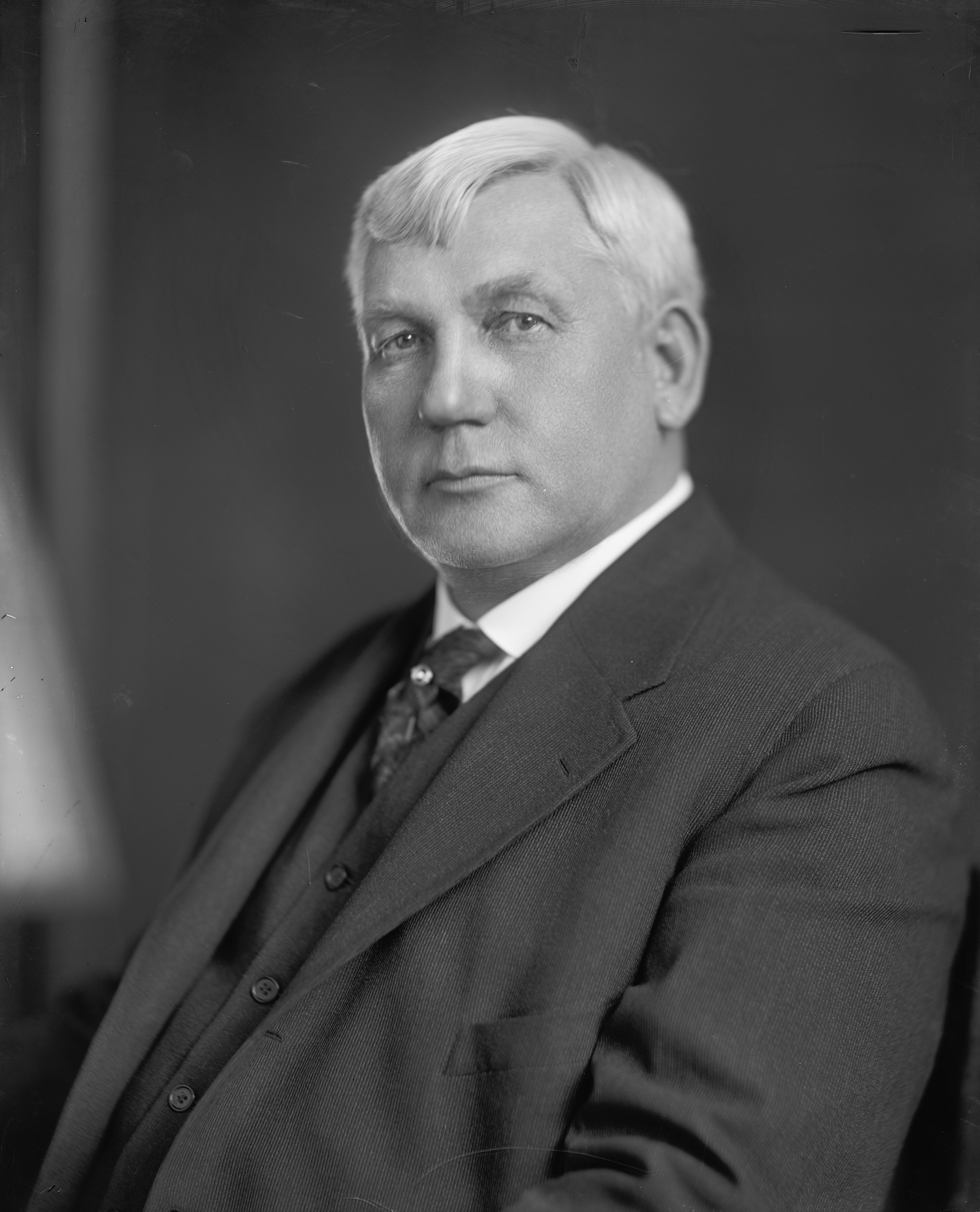
- Haugen, 1905–1933

Member of the U.S. House of Representatives from Iowa's 4th district
- In office March 4, 1899 – March 3, 1933
- Preceded by: Thomas Updegraff
- Succeeded by: Fred Biermann

33rd Dean of the United States House of Representatives
- In office May 16, 1928 – March 4, 1933
- Preceded by: Thomas S. Butler
- Succeeded by: Edward W. Pou

Member of the Iowa House of Representatives
- In office 1894–1898

Personal details
- Born: Gilbert Nelson Haugen; April 21, 1859 Orfordville, Wisconsin, United States
- Died: July 18, 1933 (aged 74) Northwood, Iowa
- Party: Republican
- Profession: Banker

Gilbert Nelson Haugen (April 21, 1859 – July 18, 1933) was a seventeen-term Republican U.S. Representative from Iowa's 4th congressional district, then located in northeastern Iowa. For nearly five years, he was the longest-serving member of the House. Born before the American Civil War, and first elected to Congress in the 19th century, Haugen served until his defeat in the 1932 Franklin D. Roosevelt landslide.

From 1928 to 1933, he was the longest-serving member of the House and was the Dean of the United States House of Representatives.

== Biography ==
Born near Orfordville, Wisconsin, Haugen attended rural schools. He moved to Decorah, Iowa, in 1873 and engaged in agricultural pursuits. He attended Breckenridge College in Decorah, and Academic and Commercial College, in Janesville, Wisconsin. After leaving college, Haugen engaged in various enterprises, principally real estate and banking. Moving to Northwood, Iowa in 1886, Haugen engaged in banking. In 1890, he organized the Northwood Banking Co. and became its president. He also served as treasurer of Worth County, Iowa, from 1887 to 1893.

In 1894, Haugen was elected to his first of two terms in the Iowa House of Representatives, where he served until 1898. That year, he was elected as a Republican to represent Iowa's 4th congressional district in the U.S. House, first serving in the Fifty-sixth Congress. He was re-elected sixteen times. On April 5, 1917, he was one of the 50 representatives who voted against declaring war on Germany. He served as chairman of the Committee on Expenditures in the Department of the Interior (in the Sixtieth Congress), and on the Committee on Agriculture (in the Sixty-sixth through Seventy-first Congresses).

Haugen served as the U. S. Congressional Agriculture Committee's chairman from 1919 to 1931. Together with Senator Charles L. McNary (R-Oregon), Haugen was the co-author of the McNary–Haugen Farm Relief Bill, a moderate farm relief bill which was offered in three separate congresses before finally passing in 1927. The McNary–Haugen Farm Relief Act was a proposed bill to limit agricultural sales within the United States. Agricultural products would be either stored or exported to protect the prices of commodities. The bill was supported by Secretary of Agriculture Henry C. Wallace and even Vice President Charles Dawes; however, it was vetoed by President Calvin Coolidge, and never went into effect.

In May 1928, Haugen had served longer than any of his House colleagues, earning him the informal title of Dean of the United States House of Representatives, a title that he would hold for five years. He was the last Republican Dean of the House for more than 84 years, until Don Young assumed the title in 2017. In all, he served in Congress from March 4, 1899, to March 4, 1933. In 1932, Haugen, like many other Republican candidates, was defeated in the Roosevelt landslide, losing to Democratic publisher Fred Biermann of Decorah. Several months after leaving Congress, Haugen died at Northwood, on July 18, 1933. He was interred in Sunset Rest Cemetery in Northwood.

== Other sources ==
- Harstad, Peter T. & Lindemann, Bonnie (1992). Gilbert N. Haugen: Norwegian-American Farm Politician. Iowa City: State Historical Society of Iowa.
- Michael, Bonnie (July/August 1978). "Gilbert N. Haugen. Apprentice Congressman". Palimpsest. 59: 118-129.
- Murphy, Daniel D. (1911). Contested Election Case of D. D. Murphy v. G.N. Haugen from the Fourth Congressional District of Iowa. Washington: Government Printing Office.
- Schacht, John N. (1980). Three Progressives From Iowa: Gilbert N. Haugen, Herbert C. Hoover, Henry A. Wallace. Iowa City: Center for the Study of the Recent History of the United States.

U.S. House of Representatives
| Preceded by Thomas Updegraff | Member of the U.S. House of Representatives from Iowa's 4th congressional district 1899–1933 | Succeeded by Fred Biermann |
| Preceded by Asbury Francis Lever | Chairman of the House Agriculture Committee; 1919–1931 | Succeeded by John Marvin Jones |
