= Henry O. Talle =

American politician

Henry Oscar Talle
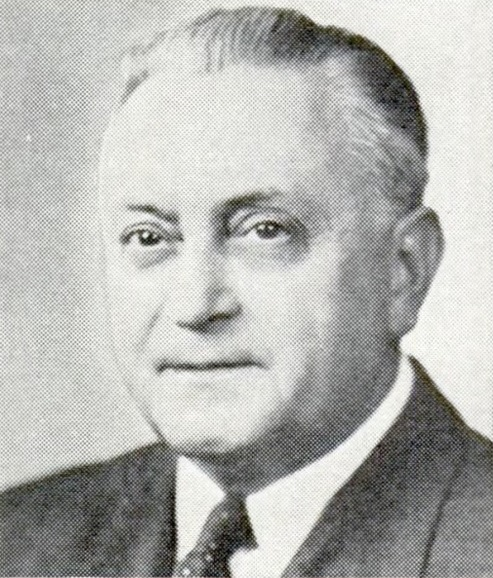
- From 1957's Pocket Congressional Directory of the Eighty-Fifth Congress.

Member of the U.S. House of Representatives from Iowa
- In office January 3, 1939 – January 3, 1959
- Preceded by: Fred Biermann
- Succeeded by: Leonard G. Wolf
- Constituency: 4th District (1939-1943); 2nd District (1943-1959)

Personal details
- Born: January 12, 1892 Albert Lea, Minnesota, U.S.
- Died: March 14, 1969 (aged 77) Washington D.C., U.S.
- Resting place: Arlington National Cemetery, Virginia, U.S.
- Party: Republican
- Profession: Economics professor

Henry Oscar Talle (January 12, 1892 – March 14, 1969) was an economics professor and a ten-term Republican U.S. Representative from eastern Iowa. He served in the United States Congress for twenty years from 1939 until 1959.

== Background ==
Born on a farm near Albert Lea, Minnesota, Talle was educated in rural schools and Luther Academy in Albert Lea. He first arrived in Luther College in Decorah, Iowa, as a student, receiving a bachelor's degree in 1917. He interrupted his own academic career to serve in the U.S. Navy in the First World War, and to serve as a teacher (and superintendent of schools) in Rugby and Rolette, North Dakota in 1919 and 1920, and as a teacher in Luther Academy in 1920 and 1921. He pursued graduate work at University of Minnesota, Boston University, Emerson College, and the University of Chicago.

== Career ==
In 1921 he returned to Decorah and Luther College to serve as a professor of economics, a position that he held until he was elected to Congress in 1938. During that period he also served as the college's treasurer from 1932 to 1938.

During the first six years of the Franklin D. Roosevelt administration, Decorah and surrounding northwestern Iowa counties in Iowa's 4th congressional district were represented by the former publisher of The Decorah Journal, Democrat Fred Biermann. Talle tried and failed to unseat Congressman Biermann in 1936, but succeeded two years later (in an election in which Republicans recaptured nearly all of the U.S. House seats in Iowa lost in the 1932 Democratic landslide). Talle won election by unseating an incumbent Democrat New Dealer from Talle's own hometown. Talle ran for re-election to his seat in the 4th district in 1940 and was re-elected.

The 1940 census caused Iowa to lose one of its nine seats in the U.S. House, forcing the 1941 Iowa General Assembly to redraw congressional district boundaries. Although Republicans then controlled the Assembly and the Governor's office, Republican Talle was considered the "goat" burdened most severely by the reapportionment plan that the Assembly ultimately approved. The old 4th district was broken up, and Talle's home county and a few others from the old 4th district were placed in a reconfigured 2nd congressional district. Compared to the old 4th district, the new 2nd district included more urban areas, including Cedar Rapids and Clinton — the home of three-term incumbent Democrat William Jacobsen and his late predecessor and father, three-term Democrat Bernhard Jacobsen. However, in Talle's 1942 race against William Jacobsen, Talle was aided by the continued decline in support in Iowa for Democrats in Washington, and won with a comfortable margin of over 15,000 votes. He would win re-election with at least 55 percent of the vote in the next six elections, while advancing in seniority within the House Republican caucus.

After the 1956 elections (in which Talle prevailed over Democrat Leonard G. Wolf but received only 52.3 percent of the vote), he was the ranking Republican on the House Banking and Currency Committee. In the mid-term elections two years later, an increase in farm costs engendered hostility against Republican policies. This time, Wolf defeated Talle. In all, Talle served in Congress from January 3, 1939 to January 3, 1959. Talle voted in favor of the Civil Rights Act of 1957.

Following his defeat, Talle remained in Washington D.C., serving in the Eisenhower administration as assistant administrator for program policy of the U.S. Housing and Home Finance Agency from February 2, 1959, to February 19, 1961. He resided in Chevy Chase, Maryland, until his death in Washington, D.C., on March 14, 1969. He was interred in Arlington National Cemetery.

== Other sources ==
- United States Congress. "Henry O. Talle (id: T000028)". Biographical Directory of the United States Congress.

U.S. House of Representatives
Preceded by Fred Biermann	Member of the U.S. House of Representatives from Iowa's 4th congressional district 1939-1943	Succeeded by Karl M. LeCompte
Preceded by William S. Jacobsen	Member of the U.S. House of Representatives from Iowa's 2nd congressional district 1943-1959	Succeeded by Leonard G. Wolf
