= William S. Jacobsen =

American politician

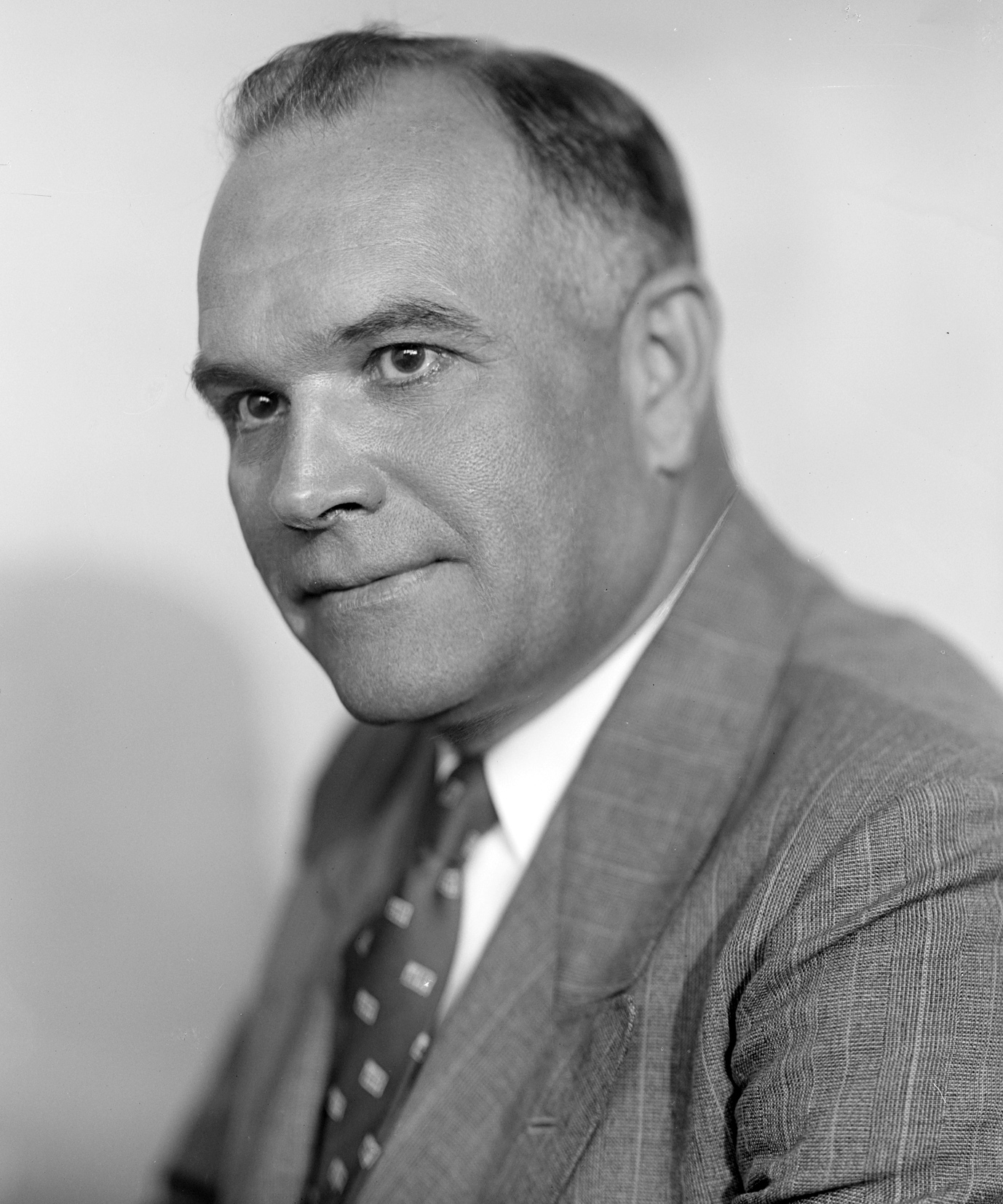

Member of the U.S. House of Representatives from Iowa's 2nd district
- In office January 3, 1937 – January 3, 1943
- Preceded by: Bernhard M. Jacobsen
- Succeeded by: Henry O. Talle

Personal details
- Born: January 15, 1887 Clinton, Iowa, U.S.
- Died: April 10, 1955 (aged 68) Dubuque, Iowa, U.S.
- Party: Democratic
- Profession: businessman

William Sebastian Jacobsen (January 15, 1887 – April 10, 1955) was a Democratic U.S. representative from Iowa's 2nd congressional district who served three terms from 1937 to 1943. He was the son of his predecessor, Bernhard M. Jacobsen who held the same congressional seat for three previous terms.

Born in Clinton, Iowa, Jacobsen attended the public schools and the Normal College of American Gymnastics Union, in Indianapolis, Indiana. He served as director of physical education of the Turner Society and Y.M.C.A., in Clinton, from 1910 to 1915. He was a manager and part owner of his family's department store in Clinton from 1915 to 1927. He then became secretary, treasurer, manager, and organizer of Clinton Thrift Co. from 1927 until after his election to Congress. He also managed business property and farm interests.

He served as delegate to Democratic State Conventions from 1932 to 1944, and the Democratic National Conventions in 1936 and 1944.

In June 1936, Jacobsen's father was a candidate for a fourth term in Congress, and had just won the Democratic primary when he became ill and died. On August 5, 1936, William Jacobsen was chosen by a special nominating convention as his father's replacement on the ballot. He won the general election over Republican Party and Farmer-Labor Party opponents, and was re-elected in 1938 and 1940.

He became the organizer and president of Clinton Broadcasting Corporation, which set up radio station KROS (AM) in 1941.

Because the 1940 census reflected that Iowa was growing more slowly than other states, the state lost one seat in Congress and its legislature was required to reapportion the remaining eight congressional districts in 1941. The redistricting placed Jacobsen in the same district as another incumbent, Republican Henry O. Talle of the old 4th district. Both ran for re-election, but Talle defeated Jacobsen by a 57% - 43% margin. In all, Jacobsen served in Congress from January 3, 1937, to January 3, 1943.

The Congressional service of Bernhard Jacobsen and William Jacobsen spanned a period of Democratic influence among Iowa's House delegation. When Bernhard Jacobsen first won in 1930, no Iowa Democrat had won election to a U.S. House seat for fourteen years. In the last four years of his tenure, Democrats from Iowa in the House delegation outnumbered Republicans by a two-to-one margin. The 1938 election would reverse that trend, leaving William Jacobsen and Vincent Harrington as the only Iowa Democrats in the House. After Jacobsen lost to Talle in the 1942 race (and Harrington withdrew from his race to go to war), another fourteen years would pass before an Iowa Democrat would win election to a U.S. House seat.

Jacobsen served as a liaison officer for the War Assets Administration, in Washington, D.C., from July 1945 to January 1947. He was later named as postmaster for his hometown of Clinton, a position held by his father, where he served from August 1, 1951, to January 1954.

He died in Dubuque, Iowa, on April 10, 1955, while attending the funeral of a brother-in law. He was interred in Springdale Cemetery in Clinton.

U.S. House of Representatives
Preceded by Bernhard M. Jacobsen	Member of the U.S. House of Representatives from Iowa's 2nd congressional district 1937-1943	Succeeded by Henry O. Talle
