= James E. Bromwell =

American politician

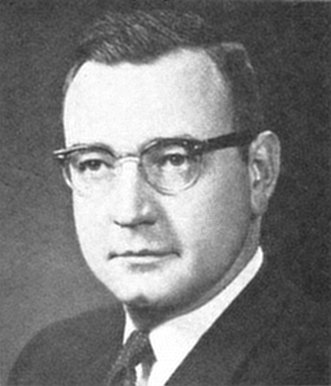

Member of the U.S. House of Representatives from Iowa's 2nd district
- In office January 3, 1961 – January 3, 1965
- Preceded by: Leonard G. Wolf
- Succeeded by: John C. Culver

Personal details
- Born: March 26, 1920 Cedar Rapids, Iowa, U.S.
- Died: September 11, 2009 (aged 89) Cedar Rapids, Iowa, U.S.
- Party: Republican
- Profession: lawyer

James Edward Bromwell (March 26, 1920 – September 11, 2009) was a two-term Republican U.S. Representative from Iowa's 2nd congressional district. He was elected in 1960, re-elected in 1962, and defeated in 1964.

Born and raised in Cedar Rapids, Iowa, Bromwell attended Andrew Johnson Elementary School in Southeast Cedar Rapids. He graduated from Franklin High School in 1938. He then enrolled at the University of Iowa and received his undergraduate degree in 1942.

Further schooling was interrupted by World War II. He entered the United States Army as a private, and was assigned to work in the European theater for the Headquarters Information and Education Division, which was a part of the Morale Department of the former Department of War. Bromwell served four years, and was discharged as a captain.

Bromwell then resumed his studies, earning admission to the Harvard Business School and graduating in 1947. He returned to the University of Iowa, graduating from the University of Iowa College of Law in 1950. He was admitted to the bar and began practice in Cedar Rapids.

In 1960, Bromwell ran as a Republican against one-term incumbent Democratic Congressman Leonard G. Wolf, defeating him as part of a good year for Republicans in Iowa. He won re-election in 1962, defeating Frank W. Less.

In 1964, however, he was challenged by fellow Franklin High School and Harvard graduate and attorney John C. Culver. As part of a national Democratic landslide, Bromwell—like all but one Republican House candidate in Iowa—lost in 1964. His congressional service began on January 3, 1961, and ended on January 3, 1965.

He resumed the practice of law in Cedar Rapids. In 1968, he was an unsuccessful candidate for the Republican nomination for United States Senator in 1968, losing to David Stanley, who in turn lost to Harold Hughes.

== Failure to file tax return ==
In 1973, Bromwell pleaded guilty in U.S. District Court in Cedar Rapids to a charge of failing to file a federal tax return in 1969, and received a $10,000 fine and one-year suspended sentence. The following year, the Iowa Supreme Court Grievance Commission found that Bromwell had conceded that he had failed to file federal tax returns for 1965 through 1972, and recommended that the Iowa Supreme Court suspend his license to practice law for eighteen months.

Bromwell returned to practice following the end of his suspension, and retired from the practice of law in 1986, residing in Cedar Rapids.

He died on September 11, 2009.

U.S. House of Representatives
Preceded by Leonard G. Wolf	Member of the U.S. House of Representatives from Iowa's 2nd congressional district 1961 – 1965	Succeeded by John Culver
