= Bernhard M. Jacobsen =

American politician (1862–1936)

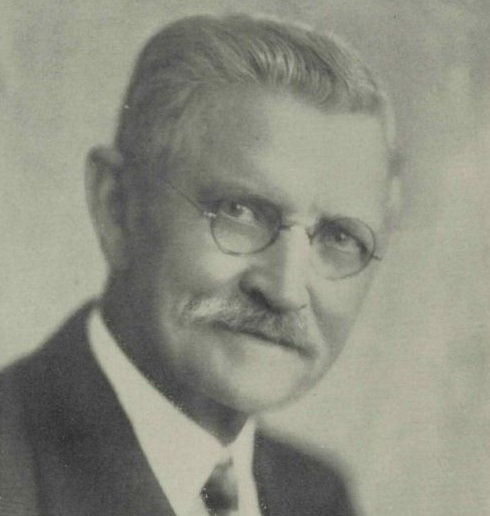
- Frontispiece of 1937's Bernhard Martin Jacobsen, Late a Representative from Iowa.

Member of the U.S. House of Representatives from Iowa's 2nd district
- In office March 4, 1931 – June 30, 1936
- Preceded by: F. Dickinson Letts
- Succeeded by: William S. Jacobsen

Personal details
- Born: March 26, 1862 Tønder, Slesvig, Denmark
- Died: June 30, 1936 (aged 74) Rochester, Minnesota, U.S.
- Party: Democratic
- Profession: Businessman

Bernhard Martin Jacobsen (March 26, 1862 – June 30, 1936) was a Democratic U.S. Representative from Iowa who served nearly three full terms during the Great Depression. He was the father of William S. Jacobsen, who succeeded him in Congress following his death.

Born in Tønder, (which was then a part of the Danish fief Schleswig, but is now in Denmark proper), Jacobsen attended the public schools. He immigrated in 1876 to the United States with his parents, who settled in Clinton, Iowa. He learned to speak English while serving as a helper in a Clinton sawmill. He was employed as a clerk in a dry goods store until 1886, when he engaged in the mercantile business. He served as postmaster of Clinton 1914–1923. He retired from the mercantile business in 1927 and engaged in the industrial finance business.

In 1930, Jacobsen was elected as a Democrat to represent Iowa's 2nd congressional district, unseating incumbent Republican Congressman F. Dickinson Letts. He was the first Democrat elected to the U.S. House of Representatives from Iowa since 1916. Jacobsen's defeat of Letts was particularly embarrassing for President Hoover, as the district included the President's home in West Branch, Cedar County. In the next two elections (in which Iowa Democrats established, then retained, a clear majority of U.S. House seats), Jacobsen won by large margins.

On June 1, 1936, Jacobsen won the Democratic primary for a fourth term, this time to the Seventy-fifth Congress. However, he died on June 30, 1936, in Rochester, Minnesota, after ten days of hospitalization. A special nominating convention selected his son, William S. Jacobsen, to fill his place on the ballot. His son then held the seat in the general election, defeating Charles Penningroth of Cedar Rapids.

He was interred in Springdale Cemetery, Clinton, Iowa.

== See also ==
- List of members of the United States Congress who died in office (1900–1949)

U.S. House of Representatives
| Preceded by F. Dickinson Letts | Member of the U.S. House of Representatives from Iowa's 2nd congressional district 1931–1936 | Succeeded by William S. Jacobsen |
