= Herbert Zelenko =

American politician from New York (1906–1979

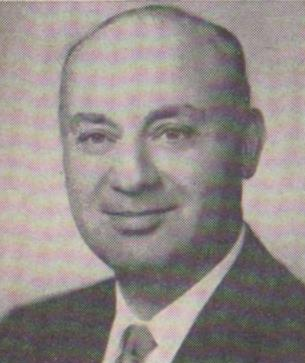

Member of the U.S. House of Representatives from New York's 21st district
- In office January 3, 1955 – January 3, 1963
- Preceded by: Jacob Javits
- Succeeded by: James C. Healey

Personal details
- Born: March 16, 1906 New York City, New York
- Died: February 23, 1979 (aged 72) New York City, New York
- Party: Democratic
- Education: Columbia University; Columbia Law School
- Occupation: Attorney

Herbert Zelenko (March 16, 1906 – February 23, 1979) was an American politician and attorney who was a U.S. representative from New York from 1955 to 1963.

== Biography ==
Zelenko was born in New York City and was of Polish origin. He attended public schools and graduated from Columbia University in 1926 and from Columbia Law School in 1928. He was admitted to the bar in 1929 and commenced the practice of law in New York City. He was a lecturer for the Practising Law Institute and Law Science Institute and an assistant United States attorney for the southern district of New York.

Zelenko was elected as a Democrat to the Eighty-fourth and to the three succeeding Congresses, serving from January 3, 1955 to January 3, 1963. He was an unsuccessful candidate for renomination in 1962 to the Eighty-eighth Congress. After his unsuccessful election, he resumed his practice of law.

He died in New York City in 1979 due to a stomach ulcer. He was buried at Sharon Gardens, Valhalla, New York.

== See also ==
- List of Jewish members of the United States Congress

U.S. House of Representatives
Preceded by Jacob K. Javits	Member of the U.S. House of Representatives from New York's 21st congressional district January 3, 1955 – January 3, 1963	Succeeded by James C. Healey
