= Leonard G. Wolf =

American politician (1925–1970)

Leonard Wolf
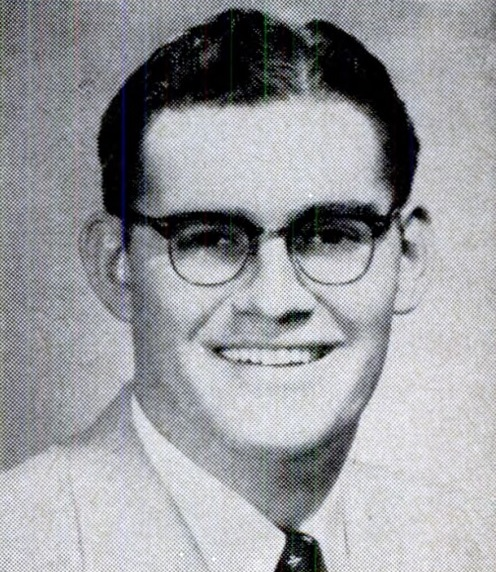
- From 1959's Pocket Congressional Directory of the Eighty-Sixth Congress.

Member of the U.S. House of Representatives from Iowa's 2nd district
- In office January 3, 1959 – January 3, 1961
- Preceded by: Henry O. Talle
- Succeeded by: James E. Bromwell

Personal details
- Born: Leonard George Wolf; October 29, 1925 Dane County, Wisconsin, US
- Died: March 28, 1970 (aged 44) Washington, D.C., US
- Resting place: St. Barnabas Cemetery, Mazomanie, Wisconsin
- Party: Democratic
- Education: University of Wisconsin–Madison
- Profession: retail feed dealer

Leonard George Wolf (October 29, 1925 – March 28, 1970) was an American World War II veteran who served as a one-term Democratic U.S. Representative from Iowa's 2nd congressional district. He was elected in 1958 and defeated in 1960 when seeking re-election.

== Early life and education ==
Born on a farm in Dane County, Wisconsin, near Mazomanie, Wolf attended the public schools of Mazomanie, Wisconsin.

=== World War II ===
He served in the United States Navy from 1944 to 1946, in the Pacific Ocean theater of World War II.

=== Education ===
He graduated from the University of Wisconsin–Madison in agricultural economics in 1949 and moved to Elkader, Iowa, the same year.

== Career ==
In Elkader, he worked as a retail feed dealer from 1952 to 1958, while delivering public speeches and lectures.

Wolf tried and failed to win election to the U.S. House in 1956, running against longtime incumbent Republican Henry O. Talle. His chances were aided by a drop in farm prices but hurt by the presence of a popular president at the top of the Republican ticket. Wolf lost, but received a higher percentage of the votes than any of Talle's previous opponents.

=== Congress ===
In the mid-term elections two years later, the prices farmers received for their products had increased, but not enough to counterbalance an even greater increase in costs, leading to an anti-Republican mood among the farmers and farm communities that served as the Republicans' traditional base in Iowa. That year, the parties' candidates in the district were the same as in 1956 and the election again was close, but the outcome was different; Wolf unseated Talle.

However, in 1960, as part of good year for Republicans in Iowa, Wolf was unseated by Republican James E. Bromwell. Wolf's congressional service began January 3, 1959, and ended January 3, 1961.

== Later career ==
After leaving Congress, Wolf was active in efforts to prevent starvation and malnutrition. In 1961 was appointed special assistant to the director of the International Cooperation Administration's Mission in Brazil, where he served until 1965. He coordinated the child feeding program for Latin America (in 1966) and in India following a drought (in 1967). In 1968, he was appointed executive director of the American Freedom From Hunger Foundation.

== Death and burial ==
Wolf died March 28, 1970, in Washington, D.C. He was interred in St. Barnabas Cemetery, Mazomanie, Wisconsin.

== Sources ==
- United States Congress. "Leonard G. Wolf (id: W000675)". Biographical Directory of the United States Congress.

U.S. House of Representatives
Preceded by Henry O. Talle	Member of the U.S. House of Representatives from Iowa's 2nd congressional district 1959 – 1961	Succeeded by James E. Bromwell
