= Sidney A. Fine =

American politician

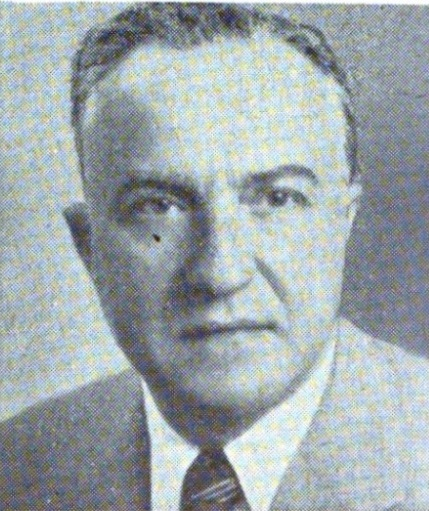
Sidney A. Fine, Congressman from New York

Sidney Asher Fine (September 14, 1903 – April 13, 1982) was an American lawyer, politician and justice of the New York Supreme Court from 1956 to 1973. From 1951 to 1956, he served three terms in the U.S. House of Representatives.

== Early life ==
Fine was born on September 14, 1903, in New York City. He graduated from City College of New York in 1923, and from Columbia Law School in 1926.

== Political career ==
=== State legislature ===
He was a member of the New York State Assembly (Bronx Co., 2nd D.) in 1945 and 1946.

He was a member of the New York State Senate (24th D.) from 1947 to 1950, sitting in the 166th and 167th New York State Legislatures.

=== Congress ===
He was elected as a Democrat to the 82nd, 83rd and 84th United States Congresses, holding office from January 3, 1951, until his resignation on January 2, 1956.

=== New York Supreme Court ===
He was a justice of the New York Supreme Court from 1956 to 1973; and an Official Referee (i.e. a Senior Judge on an additional seat) of the Supreme Court from 1974 to 1975.

== Death ==
He died on April 13, 1982, in New York City.

== Family ==
He was married to Libby Poresky and their sons were Burton M. Fine who served in the New York State Assembly in the 1960s and has practiced law in New York since 1958, and Ralph Adam Fine who served on the Wisconsin Court of Appeals.

== See also ==
- List of Jewish members of the United States Congress

== Sources ==
- United States Congress. "Sidney A. Fine (id: F000126)". Biographical Directory of the United States Congress.

New York State Assembly
Preceded by Patrick J. Fogarty	New York State Assembly; Bronx County, 2nd District; 1945–1946	Succeeded by Richard M. Goldwater
New York State Senate
Preceded by Lazarus Joseph	New York State Senate; 24th District; 1947–1950	Succeeded by John J. Donovan Jr.
U.S. House of Representatives
Preceded by Walter A. Lynch	Member of the U.S. House of Representatives from New York's 23rd congressional district 1951–1953	Succeeded by Isidore Dollinger
Preceded by Adam Clayton Powell Jr.	Member of the U.S. House of Representatives from New York's 22nd congressional district 1953–1956	Succeeded by James C. Healey
