= James C. Healey =

American politician

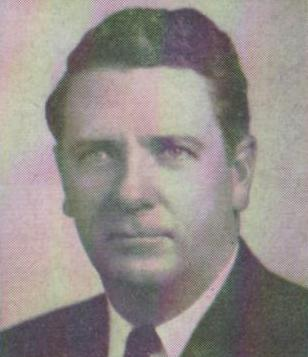
- Healey in 1959

Member of the U.S. House of Representatives from New York
- In office February 7, 1956 – January 3, 1965
- Preceded by: Sidney A. Fine
- Succeeded by: James H. Scheuer
- Constituency: 22nd district (1956–63); 21st district (1963–65)

Personal details
- Born: December 24, 1909 The Bronx, New York, U.S.
- Died: December 16, 1981 (aged 71) Southampton, New York, U.S.
- Party: Democratic
- Education: University of Pennsylvania; St. John's University School of Law
- Profession: Attorney

James Christopher Healey (December 24, 1909 – December 16, 1981) was an American lawyer and politician who was a Democratic U.S. representative from New York from 1956 to 1965.

== Early life ==
He was born in the Bronx. He graduated from the University of Pennsylvania in 1933 and St. John's University School of Law in 1936. Healey attended the University of Pennsylvania on a track and field scholarship, and was a member of relay teams that set records for the one-mile run. For several years, he was active as an official for the Amateur Athletic Union.

He was an attorney for the New York State Labor Relations Board from 1938 to 1940. He was an assistant United States attorney for the Southern District of New York from 1940 until 1943.

== Military service ==
Healey joined the United States Navy for World War II; he served from 1943 to 1946, including assignment to Europe, and attained the rank of lieutenant.

== Post-World War II ==
From 1946 to 1948, Healey was assistant corporation counsel for the city of New York. From 1948 to 1956, he was counsel to James J. Lyons, the Bronx borough president, and was recognized as a protégé of Bronx Democratic leader Charles A. Buckley.

== Congressional career ==
In 1956, Healey was elected to Congress in a special election held to fill the vacancy caused by the resignation of Sidney A. Fine. He was elected to a full term in 1956, was reelected three times, and served from February 7, 1956, until January 3, 1965. Healey suffered a stroke in 1963; he recovered in time to mount a campaign for reelection in 1964, but was an unsuccessful candidate for renomination.

Healey was a delegate to the Democratic National Conventions of 1956, 1960, and 1968.

== Retirement and death ==
In retirement, Healey was a resident of Southampton, New York. He died there on December 16, 1981, and was buried at Sacred Hearts of Jesus & Mary Roman Catholic Cemetery in Southampton.

== Family ==
Healey was married three times; in 1938 he married Eleanor R. Callahan, the daughter of Bronx political figure Joseph M. Callahan. After her death in 1956, Healey married Kathleen Cox. After he and Cox divorced, he married Mollie Allen, who survived him.

With his first wife, Healey was the father of four: James C., John J., Joseph, and Elizabeth Jane Healey Mulvihill.He was also the step-father of Bridget Healey, daughter of Kathleen Cox.

Healey had two brothers, Thomas M., and Vincent P.; Vincent was a United States Navy officer who retired with the rank of rear admiral.

== Sources ==
=== Newspapers ===
- "Eleanor Callahan Married in Church; Daughter of Justice Joseph M. Callahan Is Bride of James C. Healey". New York Times. New York, NY. September 25, 1938.
- Fitzgerald, Owen (December 1, 1960). "Federation President and 33 Alumni Elected to Congress, Courts and State Legislature". St. John's University Alumni News. Queens, NY. p. 1.
- "The Boss's Henchman". New York City Times. New York, NY. May 26, 1964.
- Sullivan, Ronald (May 28, 1964). "Schuer Pressing Healey in Bronx". New York Times. New York, NY.
- Sullivan, Ronald (June 3, 1964). "Schuer Defeats Healey in Bronx". New York Times. New York, NY.
- "James Healey Dead; An Ex-Congressman from Bronx District". New York Times. New York, NY. December 18, 1981.

=== Books ===
- Stone, Kurt F. (2011). The Jews of Capitol Hill: A Compendium of Jewish Congressional Members. Lanham, MD: Rowman & Littlefield. p. 189. ISBN 978-0-8108-5731-5.
- United States Congress (2005). Biographical Directory of the United States Congress, 1774-2005. Washington, DC: US Government Printing Office. p. 1227. ISBN 978-0-16-073176-1.
- United States House of Representatives (1982). Congressional Record: Proceedings and Debates of the 97th Congress. Washington, DC: US Government Printing Office. p. 788.

== External sources ==
- United States Congress. "James C. Healey (id: H000424)". Biographical Directory of the United States Congress.
- James C. Healey at Find a Grave

U.S. House of Representatives
Preceded by Sidney A. Fine	Member of the U.S. House of Representatives from New York's 22nd congressional district 1956–1963	Succeeded by Jacob H. Gilbert
Preceded by Herbert Zelenko	Member of the U.S. House of Representatives from New York's 21st congressional district 1963–1965	Succeeded by James H. Scheuer
