= 1946 United States House of Representatives elections =

House elections for the 80th U.S. Congress

- November 5, 1946 (Note: September 9, 1946 in Maine)

All 435 seats in the United States House of Representatives 218 seats needed for a majority
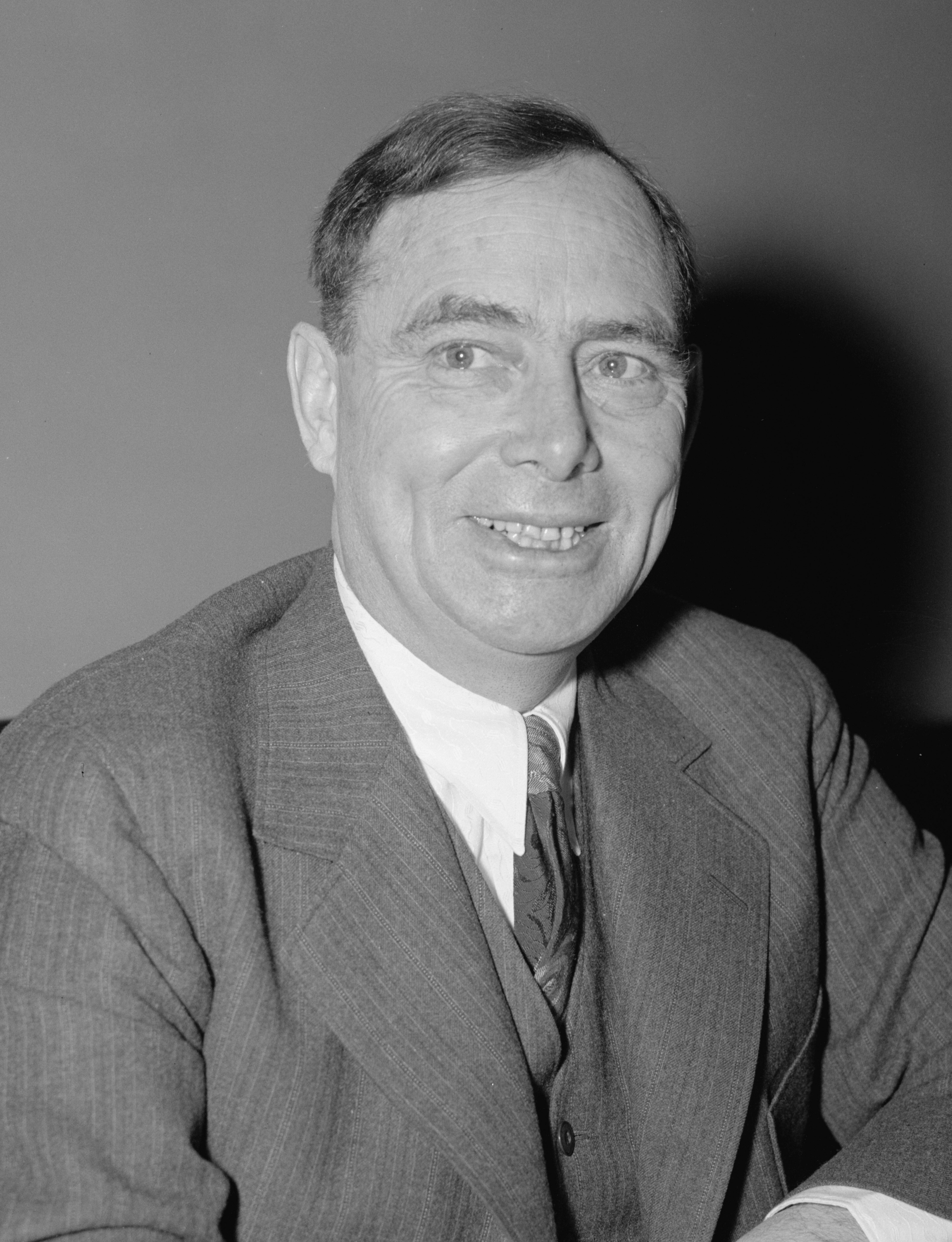

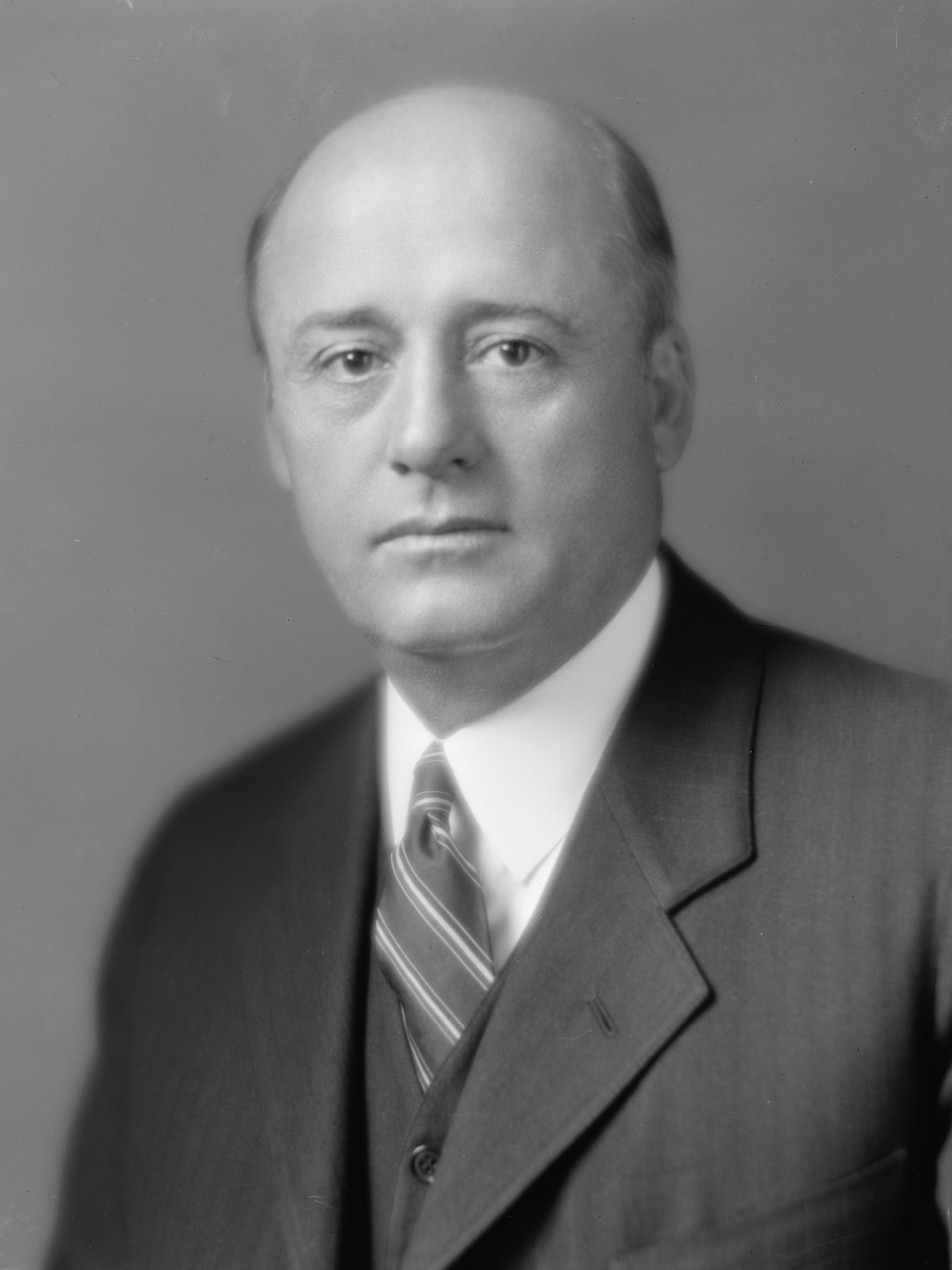
	Majority party	Minority party
Leader	Joseph Martin	Sam Rayburn
Party	Republican	Democratic
Leader since	January 3, 1939	September 16, 1940
Leader's seat	Massachusetts 14th	Texas 4th
Last election	191 seats	242 seats
Seats won	246	188
Seat change	▲55	▼54
Popular vote	18,422,363	15,491,113
Percentage	53.5%	45.0%
Swing	▲6.4pp	▼6.8pp
	Third party	Fourth party
Party	American Labor	Progressive
Last election	1 seat	1 seat
Seats won	1	0
Seat change	Steady	▼1
Popular vote	196,866	44,930
Percentage	0.6%	0.1%
Swing	▲0.3pp	▼0.1pp
Speaker before election
Sam Rayburn
Democratic
Elected Speaker
Joseph Martin
Republican

The 1946 United States House of Representatives elections were elections for the United States House of Representatives to elect members to serve in the 80th United States Congress. They were held for the most part on November 5, 1946, though Maine held its on September 9. November 1946 was 19 months after President Harry S. Truman assumed office upon the death of Franklin D. Roosevelt.

While Democrats had controlled the House for 16 years since 1931 and Roosevelt had been elected to a record four terms in office, Truman did not garner the same support as the deceased president. The 1946 election resulted in Republicans picking up 55 seats to win majority control. Joseph Martin, Republican of Massachusetts, became Speaker of the House, exchanging places with Sam Rayburn, Democrat of Texas, who became the new Minority Leader. The Democratic defeat was the largest since they were trounced in the 1928 pro-Republican wave that had seen Herbert Hoover elected president. They also lost the Senate in the concurrent Senate elections.

The vote was largely seen as a referendum on Truman, whose approval rating had sunk to 32 percent over the president's controversial handling of a wave of post-war labor strikes, including a United Auto Workers strike against Ford and General Motors in 1945, a United Mine Workers strike starting in April 1946, and a national railroad worker strike that began in May. Further damage resulted from the back-and-forth over whether to end wartime price controls, unpopular with the American business constituency, to handle shortages, particularly in meat and other foodstuffs. While Truman's early months in the White House had been plagued with questions of "What would Roosevelt do if he were alive?", Republicans now began to joke "What would Truman do if he were alive?" and "To err is Truman." However, the Republican majority was short-lived, for Democrats regained control of the House two years later. With the exception of the 1952 election, it took the GOP 48 years to retake the House, with the Republican Revolution against Bill Clinton—who was born in 1946.

== Overall results ==
↓
246	1	188
Republican	AL	Democratic

Party	Total seats	Change	Seat percentage	Popular vote	Vote percentage
Republican Party	246	▲55	56.5%	18,422,363	53.5%
Democratic Party	188	▼54	43.2%	15,491,113	45.0%
American Labor Party	1	Steady	0.2%	196,866	0.6%
Independent	0	Steady	0.0%	77,425	0.2%
Liberal Party	0	Steady	0.0%	61,111	0.2%
Prohibition Party	0	Steady	0.0%	47,792	0.1%
Socialist Party	0	Steady	0.0%	38,307	0.1%
J. Veterans Party	0	Steady	0.0%	9,791	<0.1%
U. Citizens Party	0	Steady	0.0%	5,688	<0.1%
Communist Party	0	Steady	0.0%	3,408	<0.1%
Independent Voters Party	0	Steady	0.0%	2,834	<0.1%
Veterans' Victory Party	0	Steady	0.0%	2,208	<0.1%
Socialist Workers Party	0	Steady	0.0%	1,936	<0.1%
Justice, Decency, Independence Party	0	Steady	0.0%	1,865	<0.1%
Socialist Labor Party	0	Steady	0.0%	980	<0.1%
Constitutional Government Party	0	Steady	0.0%	890	<0.1%
No Foreign Loans Party	0	Steady	0.0%	396	<0.1%
Workers Party	0	Steady	0.0%	165	<0.1%
Progressive Democratic Party	0	Steady	0.0%	141	<0.1%
$250 State Bonds Party	0	Steady	0.0%	115	<0.1%
Others	0	▼1	0.0%	44,930	0.1%
Totals	435	Steady	100.0%	34,410,324	100.0%

Source: Election Statistics - Office of the Clerk

Popular vote
Republican	53.54%
Democratic	45.02%
American Labor	0.57%
Others	0.87%

House seats
Republican	56.55%
Democratic	43.22%
American Labor	0.23%

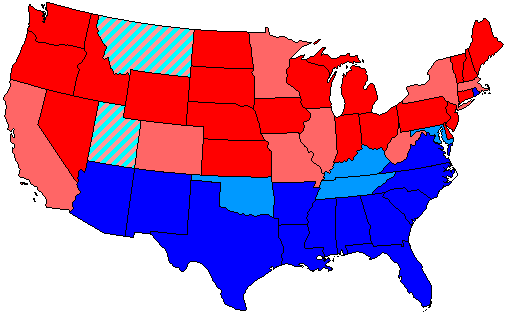
House seats by party holding plurality in state: 80+% to 100% Democratic / 80+% to 100% Republican; 60+% to 80% Democratic / 60+% to 80% Republican; Up to 60% Democratic / Up to 60% Republican

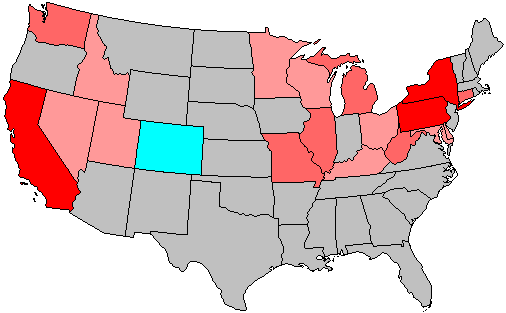
6+ Republican gain / 6+ Democratic gain; 3–5 Republican gain / 3–5 Democratic gain; 1–2 Republican gain / 1–2 Democratic gain; no net change

Popular vote and seat total in each state

== Special elections ==
In these special elections, the winner was seated during 1946 or before January 3, 1947; ordered by election date, then by district.

District	Incumbent			Results	Candidates
District	Incumbent	Party	First elected	Results	Candidates
Oregon 1	James W. Mott	Republican	1932	Incumbent died November 12, 1945. New member elected January 18, 1946. Republican hold. Winner later re-elected to the next term; see below.	▌ ✓ A. Walter Norblad (Republican) 67.28%; ▌Bruce Spalding (Democratic) 32.72%
North Carolina 10	Joseph Wilson Ervin	Democratic	1944	Incumbent died December 25, 1945. New member elected January 22, 1946. Democratic hold. Winner later re-elected to the next term; see below.	▌ ✓ Sam Ervin (Democratic) 99.3%; ▌Scattering (Write-in) 0.7%
Virginia 6	Clifton A. Woodrum	Democratic	1922	Incumbent resigned December 31, 1945, to become president of the American Plant Food Council. New member elected January 22, 1946. Democratic hold.	▌ ✓ J. Lindsay Almond (Democratic) 62.9%; ▌ George A. Revercomb (Republican) 36.6%; ▌ J. B. Brayman (Socialist) 0.5%
Georgia 5	Robert Ramspeck	Democratic	1929 (special)	Incumbent resigned December 31, 1945. New member elected February 12, 1946. Democratic hold. Winner later lost renomination to the next term; see below.	▌ ✓ Helen Douglas Mankin (Democratic) 36.5%; ▌Thomas L. Camp (Democratic) 33.9%; ▌Ben T. Hulet (Democratic) 9.0%; ▌J. E. Stewart (Democratic) 7.8%; ▌J. Verlyn Booth (Democratic) 3.5%; ▌Joe Allen (Democratic) 2.8%; Others: ▌William D. Shaw (Democratic) 1.9%; ▌Edgar W. Wilson (Democratic) 1.4%; ▌J. M. Gibson (Democratic) 1.2%; ▌Joe H. Smith (Democratic) 0.5%; ▌William E. Zachary (Democratic) 0.5%; ▌John E. Goodwin (Democratic) 0.4%; ▌James L. Asher (Democratic) 0.4%; Scattering 0.3%
New York 19	Samuel Dickstein	Democratic	1922	Incumbent resigned December 30, 1945. New member elected February 19, 1946. Democratic hold. Winner later re-elected to the next term; see below.	▌ ✓ Arthur G. Klein (Democratic) 49.5%; ▌Johannes Steel (American Labor) 38.2%; ▌William S. Shea (Republican) 12.3%
Pennsylvania 23	J. Buell Snyder	Democratic	1932	Incumbent died February 24, 1946. New member elected May 21, 1946. Republican gain. Winner did not run for the next term; see below.	▌ ✓ Carl Henry Hoffman (Republican) 52.6%; ▌Marian Snyder (Democratic) 47.4%
Pennsylvania 33	Samuel A. Weiss	Democratic	1940	Incumbent resigned January 7, 1946 to become judge of the Allegheny County Court of Common Pleas. New member elected May 21, 1946. Democratic hold. Winner later re-elected to the next term; see below.	▌ ✓ Frank Buchanan (Democratic) 59.5%; John R. Brown 40.5%
North Carolina 8	William O. Burgin	Democratic	1938	Incumbent died April 11, 1946. New member elected May 25, 1946. Democratic hold. Winner did not run for the next term; see below.	▌ ✓ Eliza Jane Pratt (Democratic) 79.5%; ▌H. Frank Hulin (Republican) 20.5%
Texas 6	Luther Alexander Johnson	Democratic	1922	Incumbent resigned July 17, 1946, after becoming judge of the U.S. Tax Court. New member elected August 24, 1946. Democratic hold. Winner later re-elected to the next term; see below.	▌ ✓ Olin E. Teague (Democratic) 100%
Puerto Rico at-large	Jesús T. Piñero	Popular Democratic	1944	Incumbent resigned September 2, 1946 to become Governor of Puerto Rico. New member elected September 11, 1946. Popular Democratic hold. Winner later re-elected to the next term; see below.	▌ ✓ Antonio Fernós Isern (Popular Democratic); [data missing]
Pennsylvania 10	John W. Murphy	Democratic	1942	Incumbent resigned July 17, 1946, to become judge of the U.S. District Court for the Middle District of Pennsylvania. New member elected November 5, 1946. Republican gain. Winner also elected to the next term; see below.	▌ ✓ James P. Scoblick (Republican) 51.2; ▌Frank X. Murray (Democratic) 48.9
Virginia 5	Thomas G. Burch	Democratic	1930	Incumbent resigned May 31, 1946, after being appointed to the U.S. Senate. New member elected November 5, 1946. Democratic hold. Winner also elected to the next term; see below.	▌ ✓ Thomas B. Stanley (Democratic) 78.7%; ▌William B. Creasy (Republican) 21.3%
Virginia 7	A. Willis Robertson	Democratic	1932	Incumbent resigned November 5, 1946, after being elected to the U.S. Senate. New member elected November 5, 1946. Democratic hold. Winner also elected to the next term; see below.	▌ ✓ Burr Harrison (Democratic) 62.5%; ▌Karl Jenkins (Republican) 37.5%

== Alabama ==
District	Incumbent			Results	Candidates
District	Incumbent	Party	First elected	Results	Candidates
Alabama 1	Frank W. Boykin	Democratic	1935 (special)	Incumbent re-elected.	▌ ✓ Frank W. Boykin (Democratic); Uncontested
Alabama 2	George M. Grant	Democratic	1938	Incumbent re-elected.	▌ ✓ George M. Grant (Democratic); Uncontested
Alabama 3	George W. Andrews	Democratic	1944	Incumbent re-elected.	▌ ✓ George W. Andrews (Democratic); Uncontested
Alabama 4	Sam Hobbs	Democratic	1934	Incumbent re-elected.	▌ ✓ Sam Hobbs (Democratic) 88.1%; ▌Roger S. Bingham (Republican) 11.9%
Alabama 5	Albert Rains	Democratic	1944	Incumbent re-elected.	▌ ✓ Albert Rains (Democratic); Uncontested
Alabama 6	Pete Jarman	Democratic	1936	Incumbent re-elected.	▌ ✓ Pete Jarman (Democratic); Uncontested
Alabama 7	Carter Manasco	Democratic	1941 (special)	Incumbent re-elected.	▌ ✓ Carter Manasco (Democratic) 72.7%; ▌M. H. Woodward (Republican) 27.3%
Alabama 8	John Sparkman	Democratic	1936	Incumbent re-elected. Elected simultaneously to U.S. Senate.	▌ ✓ John Sparkman (Democratic) 92.4%; ▌Arthur South (Republican) 7.6%
Alabama 9	Luther Patrick	Democratic	1944	Incumbent lost renomination. Democratic hold.	▌ ✓ Laurie C. Battle (Democratic) 94.1%; ▌J. G. Bass (Republican) 5.9%

== Arizona ==
Results by county Murdock: 30–40% 40–50% Harless: 30–40%

District	Incumbent			Results	Candidates
District	Incumbent	Party	First elected	Results	Candidates
Arizona at-large	John R. Murdock	Democratic	1936	Incumbent re-elected.	▌ ✓ John R. Murdock (Democratic) 33.9%; ▌ ✓ Richard F. Harless (Democratic) 32.5%; ▌Denver C. Henson (Republican) 16.8%; ▌John H. Curnutte (Republican) 16.4%; ▌Karl M. Wilson (Communist) 0.4%
Arizona at-large	Richard F. Harless	Democratic	1942	Incumbent re-elected.	▌ ✓ John R. Murdock (Democratic) 33.9%; ▌ ✓ Richard F. Harless (Democratic) 32.5%; ▌Denver C. Henson (Republican) 16.8%; ▌John H. Curnutte (Republican) 16.4%; ▌Karl M. Wilson (Communist) 0.4%

== Arkansas ==
District	Incumbent			Results	Candidates
District	Incumbent	Party	First elected	Results	Candidates
Arkansas 1	Ezekiel C. Gathings	Democratic	1938	Incumbent re-elected.	▌ ✓ Ezekiel C. Gathings (Democratic); Uncontested
Arkansas 2	Wilbur Mills	Democratic	1938	Incumbent re-elected.	▌ ✓ Wilbur Mills (Democratic); Uncontested
Arkansas 3	James William Trimble	Democratic	1944	Incumbent re-elected.	▌ ✓ James William Trimble (Democratic); Uncontested
Arkansas 4	William Fadjo Cravens	Democratic	1939 (special)	Incumbent re-elected.	▌ ✓ William Fadjo Cravens (Democratic); Uncontested
Arkansas 5	Brooks Hays	Democratic	1942	Incumbent re-elected.	▌ ✓ Brooks Hays (Democratic) 85.2%; ▌James R. Harris (Republican) 11.3%; ▌Earl C. Sowder (Ind. Republican) 3.5%
Arkansas 6	William F. Norrell	Democratic	1938	Incumbent re-elected.	▌ ✓ William F. Norrell (Democratic) 84.7%; ▌M. O. Evans (Independent) 15.3%
Arkansas 7	Oren Harris	Democratic	1940	Incumbent re-elected.	▌ ✓ Oren Harris (Democratic); Uncontested

== California ==
District	Incumbent			Results	Candidates
District	Incumbent	Party	First elected	Results	Candidates
California 1	Clarence F. Lea	Democratic	1916	Incumbent re-elected.	▌ ✓ Clarence F. Lea (Democratic); Uncontested
California 2	Clair Engle	Democratic	1943 (special)	Incumbent re-elected.	▌ ✓ Clair Engle (Democratic); Uncontested
California 3	J. Leroy Johnson	Republican	1942	Incumbent re-elected.	▌ ✓ J. Leroy Johnson (Republican); Uncontested
California 4	Franck R. Havenner	Democratic	1944	Incumbent re-elected.	▌ ✓ Franck R. Havenner (Democratic) 52.9%; ▌Truman R. Young (Republican) 47.1%
California 5	Richard J. Welch	Republican	1926	Incumbent re-elected.	▌ ✓ Richard J. Welch (Republican); Uncontested
California 6	George P. Miller	Democratic	1944	Incumbent re-elected.	▌ ✓ George P. Miller (Democratic); Uncontested
California 7	John H. Tolan	Democratic	1934	Incumbent retired. Republican gain.	▌ ✓ John J. Allen Jr. (Republican) 56.2%; ▌Patrick W. McDonough (Democratic) 43.8%
California 8	Jack Z. Anderson	Republican	1938	Incumbent re-elected.	▌ ✓ Jack Z. Anderson (Republican); Uncontested
California 9	Bertrand W. Gearhart	Republican	1934	Incumbent re-elected.	▌ ✓ Bertrand W. Gearhart (Republican) 53.7%; ▌Hubert Phillips (Democratic) 46.3%
California 10	Alfred J. Elliott	Democratic	1937 (special)	Incumbent re-elected.	▌ ✓ Alfred J. Elliott (Democratic); Uncontested
California 11	George E. Outland	Democratic	1942	Incumbent lost re-election. Republican gain.	▌ ✓ Ernest K. Bramblett (Republican) 53.1%; ▌George E. Outland (Democratic) 46.9%
California 12	Jerry Voorhis	Democratic	1936	Incumbent lost re-election. Republican gain.	▌ ✓ Richard Nixon (Republican) 56.0%; ▌Jerry Voorhis (Democratic) 42.7%; ▌John Henry Hoeppel (Prohibition) 1.3%
California 13	Ned R. Healy	Democratic	1944	Incumbent lost re-election. Republican gain.	▌ ✓ Norris Poulson (Republican) 51.8%; ▌Ned R. Healy (Democratic) 48.2%
California 14	Helen Gahagan Douglas	Democratic	1944	Incumbent re-elected.	▌ ✓ Helen Gahagan Douglas (Democratic) 54.4%; ▌Frederick M. Roberts (Republican) 45.6%
California 15	Gordon L. McDonough	Republican	1944	Incumbent re-elected.	▌ ✓ Gordon L. McDonough (Republican); Uncontested
California 16	Ellis E. Patterson	Democratic	1944	Incumbent retired to run for U.S. senator. Republican gain.	▌ ✓ Donald L. Jackson (Republican) 53.9%; ▌Harold Harby (Democratic) 31.7%; ▌Ellis E. Patterson (Write-in) 14.4%
California 17	Cecil R. King	Democratic	1942	Incumbent re-elected.	▌ ✓ Cecil R. King (Democratic); Uncontested
California 18	Clyde Doyle	Democratic	1944	Incumbent lost re-election. Republican gain.	▌ ✓ Willis W. Bradley (Republican) 52.8%; ▌Clyde Doyle (Democratic) 47.2%
California 19	Chet Holifield	Democratic	1942	Incumbent re-elected.	▌ ✓ Chet Holifield (Democratic) 97.6%; ▌Marshall J. Morrill (Write-in) 2.4%
California 20	John Carl Hinshaw	Republican	1938	Incumbent re-elected.	▌ ✓ John Carl Hinshaw (Republican) 59.3%; ▌Everett G. Burkhalter (Democratic) 40.7%
California 21	Harry R. Sheppard	Democratic	1936	Incumbent re-elected.	▌ ✓ Harry R. Sheppard (Democratic) 52.7%; ▌Lowell E. Lathrop (Republican) 47.3%
California 22	John Phillips	Republican	1942	Incumbent re-elected.	▌ ✓ John Phillips (Republican) 62.1%; ▌Ray Adkinson (Democratic) 37.9%
California 23	Edouard Izac	Democratic	1936	Incumbent lost re-election. Republican gain.	▌ ✓ Charles K. Fletcher (Republican) 56.3%; ▌Edouard Izac (Democratic) 43.7%

== Colorado ==
District	Incumbent			Results	Candidates
District	Incumbent	Party	First elected	Results	Candidates
Colorado 1	Dean M. Gillespie	Republican	1944	Incumbent lost re-election. Democratic gain.	▌ ✓ John A. Carroll (Democratic) 51.8%; ▌Dean M. Gillespie (Republican) 47.7%; ▌Edgar P. Sherman (Socialist) 0.6%
Colorado 2	William S. Hill	Republican	1940	Incumbent re-elected.	▌ ✓ William S. Hill (Republican) 65.7%; ▌Frank A. Safranek (Democratic) 32.9%; ▌Benjamin E. O'Brien (Independent) 0.9%; ▌William E. Randall (Socialist) 0.6%
Colorado 3	John Chenoweth	Republican	1940	Incumbent re-elected.	▌ ✓ John Chenoweth (Republican) 54.6%; ▌Walter W. Johnson (Democratic) 45.4%
Colorado 4	Robert F. Rockwell	Republican	1941 (special)	Incumbent re-elected.	▌ ✓ Robert F. Rockwell (Republican) 58.7%; ▌Thomas Matthews (Democratic) 41.3%

== Connecticut ==
District	Incumbent			Results	Candidates
District	Incumbent	Party	First elected	Results	Candidates
Connecticut 1	Herman P. Kopplemann	Democratic	1944	Incumbent lost re-election. Republican gain.	▌ ✓ William J. Miller (Republican) 53.1%; ▌Herman P. Kopplemann (Democratic) 46.9%
Connecticut 2	Chase G. Woodhouse	Democratic	1944	Incumbent lost re-election. Republican gain.	▌ ✓ Horace Seely-Brown Jr. (Republican) 55.3%; ▌Chase G. Woodhouse (Democratic) 44.7%
Connecticut 3	James P. Geelan	Democratic	1944	Incumbent lost re-election. Republican gain.	▌ ✓ Ellsworth Foote (Republican) 58.9%; ▌James P. Geelan (Democratic) 41.1%
Connecticut 4	Clare Boothe Luce	Republican	1942	Incumbent retired. Republican hold.	▌ ✓ John Davis Lodge (Republican) 57.1%; ▌Henry A. Mucci (Democratic) 35.4%; ▌Stanley W. Mayhew (Socialist) 5.8%; ▌William W. Sullivan (Independent) 1.7%
Connecticut 5	Joseph E. Talbot	Republican	1942	Incumbent retired to run for Governor. Republican hold.	▌ ✓ James T. Patterson (Republican) 53.1%; ▌Thomas Radzevich (Democratic) 40.8%; ▌John C. Cluney (Socialist) 6.0%; ▌John C. Cluney (Good Government) 0.1%
Connecticut at-large	Joseph F. Ryter	Democratic	1944	Incumbent lost re-election. Republican gain.	▌ ✓ Antoni Sadlak (Republican) 55.6%; ▌Joseph F. Ryter (Democratic) 40.9%; ▌Raymond C. Smith (Socialist) 3.3%; ▌Michael A. Russo (Communist) 0.2%

== Delaware ==
District	Incumbent			Results	Candidates
District	Incumbent	Party	First elected	Results	Candidates
Delaware at-large	Philip A. Traynor	Democratic	1944	Incumbent lost re-election. Republican gain.	▌ ✓ J. Caleb Boggs (Republican) 56.4%; ▌Philip A. Traynor (Democratic) 43.6%

== Florida ==
District	Incumbent			Results	Candidates
District	Incumbent	Party	First elected	Results	Candidates
Florida 1	J. Hardin Peterson	Democratic	1932	Incumbent re-elected.	▌ ✓ J. Hardin Peterson (Democratic); Uncontested
Florida 2	Emory H. Price	Democratic	1942	Incumbent re-elected.	▌ ✓ Emory H. Price (Democratic); Uncontested
Florida 3	Bob Sikes	Democratic	1940; 1944 (resigned); 1974	Incumbent re-elected.	▌ ✓ Bob Sikes (Democratic); Uncontested
Florida 4	Pat Cannon	Democratic	1938	Incumbent lost renomination. Democratic hold.	▌ ✓ George Smathers (Democratic) 71.9%; ▌Norman N. Curtis (Republican) 28.1%
Florida 5	Joe Hendricks	Democratic	1936	Incumbent re-elected.	▌ ✓ Joe Hendricks (Democratic) 61.3%; ▌M. J. Moss Jr. (Republican) 38.7%
Florida 6	Dwight L. Rogers	Democratic	1944	Incumbent re-elected.	▌ ✓ Dwight L. Rogers (Democratic) 71.1%; ▌Joseph P. Moe (Republican) 28.9%

== Georgia ==
District	Incumbent			Results	Candidates
District	Incumbent	Party	First elected	Results	Candidates
Georgia 1	Hugh Peterson	Democratic	1934	Incumbent lost renomination. Democratic hold.	▌ ✓ Prince Hulon Preston Jr. (Democratic) 99.9%; ▌H. W. Sheppard (Independent) 0.1%
Georgia 2	Edward E. Cox	Democratic	1924	Incumbent re-elected.	▌ ✓ Edward E. Cox (Democratic); Uncontested
Georgia 3	Stephen Pace	Democratic	1936	Incumbent re-elected.	▌ ✓ Stephen Pace (Democratic); Uncontested
Georgia 4	Albert Sidney Camp	Democratic	1939 (special)	Incumbent re-elected.	▌ ✓ Albert Sidney Camp (Democratic); Uncontested
Georgia 5	Helen Douglas Mankin	Democratic	1946 (special)	Incumbent lost renomination and then lost re-election as an independent. Democratic hold.	▌ ✓ James C. Davis (Democratic) 61.7%; ▌Helen Douglas Mankin (Independent) 38.3%; ▌Henry A. Alexander (Independent) 0.05%
Georgia 6	Carl Vinson	Democratic	1914	Incumbent re-elected.	▌ ✓ Carl Vinson (Democratic); Uncontested
Georgia 7	Malcolm C. Tarver	Democratic	1926	Incumbent lost renomination. Democratic hold.	▌ ✓ Henderson Lovelace Lanham (Democratic); Uncontested
Georgia 8	John S. Gibson	Democratic	1940	Incumbent lost renomination. Democratic hold.	▌ ✓ William M. Wheeler (Democratic); Uncontested
Georgia 9	John Stephens Wood	Democratic	1944	Incumbent re-elected.	▌ ✓ John Stephens Wood (Democratic); Uncontested
Georgia 10	Paul Brown	Democratic	1933 (special)	Incumbent re-elected.	▌ ✓ Paul Brown (Democratic); Uncontested

== Idaho ==
District	Incumbent			Results	Candidates
District	Incumbent	Party	First elected	Results	Candidates
Idaho 1	Compton I. White	Democratic	1932	Incumbent lost re-election. Republican gain.	▌ ✓ Abe Goff (Republican) 50.6%; ▌Compton I. White (Democratic) 49.4%
Idaho 2	Henry Dworshak	Republican	1938	Incumbent retired to run for U.S. senator. Republican hold.	▌ ✓ John C. Sanborn (Republican) 60.7%; ▌Pete Leguineche (Democratic) 39.3%

== Illinois ==
Illinois' Results

District	Incumbent			Results	Candidates
District	Incumbent	Party	First elected	Results	Candidates
Illinois 1	William L. Dawson	Democratic	1942	Incumbent re-elected.	▌ ✓ William L. Dawson (Democratic) 56.8%; ▌William E. King (Republican) 43.2%
Illinois 2	William A. Rowan	Democratic	1942	Incumbent lost re-election. Republican gain.	▌ ✓ Richard B. Vail (Republican) 51.3%; ▌William A. Rowan (Democratic) 48.7%
Illinois 3	Edward A. Kelly	Democratic	1944	Incumbent lost re-election. Republican gain.	▌ ✓ Fred E. Busbey (Republican) 57.2%; ▌Edward A. Kelly (Democratic) 42.8%
Illinois 4	Martin Gorski	Democratic	1942	Incumbent re-elected.	▌ ✓ Martin Gorski (Democratic) 70.7%; ▌John T. Parsons (Republican) 29.3%
Illinois 5	Adolph J. Sabath	Democratic	1906	Incumbent re-elected.	▌ ✓ Adolph J. Sabath (Democratic) 71.6%; ▌Michael A. Francisco (Republican) 28.4%
Illinois 6	Thomas J. O'Brien	Democratic	1942	Incumbent re-elected.	▌ ✓ Thomas J. O'Brien (Democratic) 52.0%; ▌Harold C. Woodward (Republican) 48.0%
Illinois 7	William W. Link	Democratic	1944	Incumbent lost re-election. Republican gain.	▌ ✓ Thomas L. Owens (Republican) 55.0%; ▌William W. Link (Democratic) 45.0%
Illinois 8	Thomas S. Gordon	Democratic	1942	Incumbent re-elected.	▌ ✓ Thomas S. Gordon (Democratic) 77.3%; ▌Scott John Vitell (Republican) 22.7%
Illinois 9	Alexander J. Resa	Democratic	1944	Incumbent lost re-election. Republican gain.	▌ ✓ Robert Twyman (Republican) 51.3%; ▌Alexander J. Resa (Democratic) 48.7%
Illinois 10	Ralph E. Church	Republican	1942	Incumbent re-elected.	▌ ✓ Ralph E. Church (Republican) 64.7%; ▌Harold H. Kolbe (Democratic) 35.3%
Illinois 11	Chauncey W. Reed	Republican	1934	Incumbent re-elected.	▌ ✓ Chauncey W. Reed (Republican) 74.9%; ▌Louis William Oswald (Democratic) 25.1%
Illinois 12	Noah M. Mason	Republican	1936	Incumbent re-elected.	▌ ✓ Noah M. Mason (Republican) 69.1%; ▌Richard G. Myrland (Democratic) 30.9%
Illinois 13	Leo E. Allen	Republican	1932	Incumbent re-elected.	▌ ✓ Leo E. Allen (Republican) 77.8%; ▌Michael M. Kinney (Democratic) 22.2%
Illinois 14	Anton J. Johnson	Republican	1938	Incumbent re-elected.	▌ ✓ Anton J. Johnson (Republican) 62.1%; ▌Carl E. Wright Jr. (Democratic) 37.9%
Illinois 15	Robert B. Chiperfield	Republican	1938	Incumbent re-elected.	▌ ✓ Robert B. Chiperfield (Republican) 64.3%; ▌Henry D. Sullivan (Democratic) 35.7%
Illinois 16	Everett Dirksen	Republican	1932	Incumbent re-elected.	▌ ✓ Everett Dirksen (Republican) 67.5%; ▌Hans A. Spading (Democratic) 32.5%
Illinois 17	Leslie C. Arends	Republican	1934	Incumbent re-elected.	▌ ✓ Leslie C. Arends (Republican) 71.2%; ▌Carl Vrooman (Democratic) 28.8%
Illinois 18	Jessie Sumner	Republican	1938	Incumbent retired. Republican hold.	▌ ✓ Edward H. Jenison (Republican) 65.1%; ▌C. E. Spang (Democratic) 34.9%
Illinois 19	Rolla C. McMillen	Republican	1944	Incumbent re-elected.	▌ ✓ Rolla C. McMillen (Republican) 62.5%; ▌Olive Remington Goldman (Democratic) 37.5%
Illinois 20	Sid Simpson	Republican	1942	Incumbent re-elected.	▌ ✓ Sid Simpson (Republican) 58.8%; ▌Don Irving (Democratic) 41.2%
Illinois 21	George Evan Howell	Republican	1940	Incumbent re-elected.	▌ ✓ George Evan Howell (Republican) 55.1%; ▌Roscoe Bonjean (Democratic) 44.9%
Illinois 22	Melvin Price	Democratic	1944	Incumbent re-elected.	▌ ✓ Melvin Price (Democratic) 50.7%; ▌Calvin D. Johnson (Republican) 49.3%
Illinois 23	Charles W. Vursell	Republican	1942	Incumbent re-elected.	▌ ✓ Charles W. Vursell (Republican) 54.9%; ▌Homer Kasserman (Democratic) 45.1%
Illinois 24	Roy Clippinger	Republican	1945 (special)	Incumbent re-elected.	▌ ✓ Roy Clippinger (Republican) 58.9%; ▌Edward Hines (Democratic) 41.1%
Illinois 25	C. W. Bishop	Republican	1940	Incumbent re-elected.	▌ ✓ C. W. Bishop (Republican) 59.8%; ▌Sherman S. Carr (Democratic) 40.2%
Illinois at-large	Emily Taft Douglas	Democratic	1944	Incumbent lost re-election. Republican gain.	▌ ✓ William Stratton (Republican) 55.1%; ▌Emily Taft Douglas (Democratic) 44.5%; ▌Elizabeth Stephens Carr (Prohibition) 0.4%

== Indiana ==
District	Incumbent			Results	Candidates
District	Incumbent	Party	First elected	Results	Candidates
Indiana 1	Ray Madden	Democratic	1942	Incumbent re-elected.	▌ ✓ Ray Madden (Democratic) 51.9%; ▌Charles W. Gannon (Republican) 46.8%; ▌Hubert F. Jackson (Prohibition) 0.8%; ▌Harvey E. Taylor (Socialist Labor) 0.5%
Indiana 2	Charles A. Halleck	Republican	1935 (special)	Incumbent re-elected.	▌ ✓ Charles A. Halleck (Republican) 61.3%; ▌Margaret A. Afflis (Democratic) 37.7%; ▌F. W. Lowe (Prohibition) 1.0%
Indiana 3	Robert A. Grant	Republican	1938	Incumbent re-elected.	▌ ✓ Robert A. Grant (Republican) 55.6%; ▌John S. Gonas (Democratic) 43.6%; ▌William Oesch (Prohibition) 0.8%
Indiana 4	George W. Gillie	Republican	1938	Incumbent re-elected.	▌ ✓ George W. Gillie (Republican) 59.4%; ▌Walter E. Frederick (Democratic) 39.5%; ▌George W. Holston (Prohibition) 1.1%
Indiana 5	Forest Harness	Republican	1938	Incumbent re-elected.	▌ ✓ Forest Harness (Republican) 55.0%; ▌William W. Welsh (Democratic) 42.3%; ▌A. W. Snyder (Prohibition) 2.6%
Indiana 6	Noble J. Johnson	Republican	1938	Incumbent re-elected.	▌ ✓ Noble J. Johnson (Republican) 57.4%; ▌Thomas A. Sigler (Democratic) 41.7%; ▌John R. Sheets (Prohibition) 0.9%
Indiana 7	Gerald W. Landis	Republican	1938	Incumbent re-elected.	▌ ✓ Gerald W. Landis (Republican) 50.6%; ▌James E. Noland (Democratic) 47.7%; ▌Robert Gemmer (Prohibition) 1.7%
Indiana 8	Charles M. La Follette	Republican	1942	Incumbent retired to run for U.S. senator. Republican hold.	▌ ✓ E. A. Mitchell (Republican) 51.8%; ▌Winfield K. Denton (Democratic) 47.3%; ▌C. Dana Malpass (Prohibition) 0.9%
Indiana 9	Earl Wilson	Republican	1940	Incumbent re-elected.	▌ ✓ Earl Wilson (Republican) 55.8%; ▌Oliver O. Dixon (Democratic) 43.3%; ▌Garnet Jewell (Prohibition) 0.9%
Indiana 10	Raymond S. Springer	Republican	1938	Incumbent re-elected.	▌ ✓ Raymond S. Springer (Republican) 59.3%; ▌Frank C. Unger (Democratic) 37.4%; ▌Carl W. Thompson (Prohibition) 3.3%
Indiana 11	Louis Ludlow	Democratic	1928	Incumbent re-elected.	▌ ✓ Louis Ludlow (Democratic) 51.1%; ▌Albert J. Beveridge (Republican) 48.3%; ▌Marion Gatlin (Prohibition) 0.6%

== Iowa ==
District	Incumbent			Results	Candidates
District	Incumbent	Party	First elected	Results	Candidates
Iowa 1	Thomas E. Martin	Republican	1938	Incumbent re-elected.	▌ ✓ Thomas E. Martin (Republican) 61.5%; ▌Clair A. Williams (Democratic) 38.5%
Iowa 2	Henry O. Talle	Republican	1938	Incumbent re-elected.	▌ ✓ Henry O. Talle (Republican) 59.1%; ▌Richard V. Bernhart (Democratic) 40.9%
Iowa 3	John W. Gwynne	Republican	1934	Incumbent re-elected.	▌ ✓ John W. Gwynne (Republican) 62.0%; ▌Dan J. P. Ryan (Democratic) 38.0%
Iowa 4	Karl M. LeCompte	Republican	1938	Incumbent re-elected.	▌ ✓ Karl M. LeCompte (Republican) 58.4%; ▌A. E. Augustine (Democratic) 41.6%
Iowa 5	Paul Cunningham	Republican	1940	Incumbent re-elected.	▌ ✓ Paul Cunningham (Republican) 59.4%; ▌Vince L. Browner (Democratic) 40.6%
Iowa 6	James I. Dolliver	Republican	1944	Incumbent re-elected.	▌ ✓ James I. Dolliver (Republican) 63.4%; ▌Oscar E. Johnson (Democratic) 36.6%
Iowa 7	Ben F. Jensen	Republican	1938	Incumbent re-elected.	▌ ✓ Ben F. Jensen (Republican) 63.0%; ▌Philip A. Allen (Democratic) 37.0%
Iowa 8	Charles B. Hoeven	Republican	1942	Incumbent re-elected.	▌ ✓ Charles B. Hoeven (Republican) 68.6%; ▌George A. Heikens (Democratic) 31.4%

== Kansas ==
District	Incumbent			Results	Candidates
District	Incumbent	Party	First elected	Results	Candidates
Kansas 1	Albert M. Cole	Republican	1944	Incumbent re-elected.	▌ ✓ Albert M. Cole (Republican) 64.3%; ▌James W. Lowry (Democratic) 35.7%
Kansas 2	Errett P. Scrivner	Republican	1943 (special)	Incumbent re-elected.	▌ ✓ Errett P. Scrivner (Republican) 58.8%; ▌Murray H. Hodges (Democratic) 41.2%
Kansas 3	Thomas Daniel Winter	Republican	1938	Incumbent lost renomination. Republican hold.	▌ ✓ Herbert Alton Meyer (Republican) 55.3%; ▌Jo E. Gaitskill (Democratic) 44.7%
Kansas 4	Edward Herbert Rees	Republican	1936	Incumbent re-elected.	▌ ✓ Edward Herbert Rees (Republican) 56.2%; ▌William P. Warren (Democratic) 43.8%
Kansas 5	Clifford R. Hope	Republican	1926	Incumbent re-elected.	▌ ✓ Clifford R. Hope (Republican) 62.6%; ▌Arthur L. Sparks (Democratic) 37.4%
Kansas 6	Frank Carlson	Republican	1934	Incumbent retired to run for Governor. Republican hold.	▌ ✓ Wint Smith (Republican) 58.1%; ▌G. E. Bengtson (Democratic) 37.9%; ▌C. Floyd Hester (Prohibition) 4.0%

== Kentucky ==
District	Incumbent			Results	Candidates
District	Incumbent	Party	First elected	Results	Candidates
Kentucky 1	Noble Jones Gregory	Democratic	1936	Incumbent re-elected.	▌ ✓ Noble Jones Gregory (Democratic) 66.2%; ▌William E. Porter (Republican) 33.1%; ▌Joseph S. Freeland (Socialist) 0.7%
Kentucky 2	Earle Clements	Democratic	1944	Incumbent re-elected.	▌ ✓ Earle Clements (Democratic) 56.6%; ▌Thomas W. Hines (Republican) 43.4%
Kentucky 3	Emmet O'Neal	Democratic	1934	Incumbent lost re-election. Republican gain.	▌ ✓ Thruston Ballard Morton (Republican) 58.1%; ▌Emmet O'Neal (Democratic) 41.9%
Kentucky 4	Frank Chelf	Democratic	1944	Incumbent re-elected.	▌ ✓ Frank Chelf (Democratic) 53.1%; ▌Don Victor Drye (Republican) 46.9%
Kentucky 5	Brent Spence	Democratic	1930	Incumbent re-elected.	▌ ✓ Brent Spence (Democratic) 51.2%; ▌Marion W. Moore (Republican) 48.8%
Kentucky 6	Virgil Chapman	Democratic	1930	Incumbent re-elected.	▌ ✓ Virgil Chapman (Democratic) 55.0%; ▌W. D. Rogers (Republican) 45.0%
Kentucky 7	Andrew J. May	Democratic	1930	Incumbent lost re-election. Republican gain.	▌ ✓ Wendell H. Meade (Republican) 59.3%; ▌Andrew J. May (Democratic) 40.7%
Kentucky 8	Joe B. Bates	Democratic	1930	Incumbent re-elected.	▌ ✓ Joe B. Bates (Democratic) 52.6%; ▌Ray Schmauch (Republican) 47.4%
Kentucky 9	John M. Robsion	Republican	1934	Incumbent re-elected.	▌ ✓ John M. Robsion (Republican); Uncontested

== Louisiana ==
District	Incumbent			Results	Candidates
District	Incumbent	Party	First elected	Results	Candidates
Louisiana 1	F. Edward Hébert	Democratic	1940	Incumbent re-elected.	▌ ✓ F. Edward Hébert (Democratic) 91.8%; ▌Dennison Suarez (Republican) 8.2%
Louisiana 2	Paul H. Maloney	Democratic	1942	Incumbent retired. Democratic hold.	▌ ✓ Hale Boggs (Democratic) 90.7%; ▌Harold M. Herbst (Republican) 9.3%
Louisiana 3	James R. Domengeaux	Democratic	1940	Incumbent re-elected.	▌ ✓ James R. Domengeaux (Democratic); Uncontested
Louisiana 4	Overton Brooks	Democratic	1936	Incumbent re-elected.	▌ ✓ Overton Brooks (Democratic); Uncontested
Louisiana 5	Charles E. McKenzie	Democratic	1942	Incumbent lost renomination. Democratic hold.	▌ ✓ Otto Passman (Democratic); Uncontested
Louisiana 6	James H. Morrison	Democratic	1942	Incumbent re-elected.	▌ ✓ James H. Morrison (Democratic); Uncontested
Louisiana 7	Henry D. Larcade Jr.	Democratic	1942	Incumbent re-elected.	▌ ✓ Henry D. Larcade Jr. (Democratic); Uncontested
Louisiana 8	A. Leonard Allen	Democratic	1936	Incumbent re-elected.	▌ ✓ A. Leonard Allen (Democratic); Uncontested

== Maine ==
District	Incumbent			Results	Candidates
District	Incumbent	Party	First elected	Results	Candidates
Maine 1	Robert Hale	Republican	1942	Incumbent re-elected.	▌ ✓ Robert Hale (Republican) 59.6%; ▌John C. Fitzgerald (Democratic) 40.4%
Maine 2	Margaret Chase Smith	Republican	1940	Incumbent re-elected.	▌ ✓ Margaret Chase Smith (Republican) 60.7%; ▌Edward J. Beauchamp (Democratic) 39.3%
Maine 3	Frank Fellows	Republican	1940	Incumbent re-elected.	▌ ✓ Frank Fellows (Republican) 72.9%; ▌John M. Coghill (Democratic) 27.1%

== Maryland ==
District	Incumbent			Results	Candidates
District	Incumbent	Party	First elected	Results	Candidates
Maryland 1	Dudley Roe	Democratic	1944	Incumbent lost re-election. Republican gain.	▌ ✓ Edward T. Miller (Republican) 50.9%; ▌Dudley Roe (Democratic) 49.1%
Maryland 2	Harry Streett Baldwin	Democratic	1942	Incumbent retired to run for Governor. Democratic hold.	▌ ✓ Hugh Meade (Democratic) 52.4%; ▌David G. Harry (Republican) 47.6%
Maryland 3	Thomas D'Alesandro Jr.	Democratic	1938	Incumbent re-elected.	▌ ✓ Thomas D'Alesandro Jr. (Democratic) 63.9%; ▌Edward N. Kowzan (Republican) 36.1%
Maryland 4	George Hyde Fallon	Democratic	1944	Incumbent re-elected.	▌ ✓ George Hyde Fallon (Democratic) 57.2%; ▌Paul Robertson (Republican) 42.8%
Maryland 5	Lansdale Sasscer	Democratic	1939 (special)	Incumbent re-elected.	▌ ✓ Lansdale Sasscer (Democratic) 58.2%; ▌Edwin A. Glenn (Republican) 41.8%
Maryland 6	James Glenn Beall	Republican	1942	Incumbent re-elected.	▌ ✓ James Glenn Beall (Republican) 58.1%; ▌Arch McDonald (Democratic) 41.9%

== Massachusetts ==
District	Incumbent			Results	Candidates
District	Incumbent	Party	First elected	Results	Candidates
Massachusetts 1	John W. Heselton	Republican	1944	Incumbent re-elected.	▌ ✓ John W. Heselton (Republican) 58.0%; ▌John J. Falvey (Democratic) 39.7%; ▌Chester M. Delf (Prohibition) 2.2%
Massachusetts 2	Charles R. Clason	Republican	1936	Incumbent re-elected.	▌ ✓ Charles R. Clason (Republican) 51.4%; ▌Foster Furcolo (Democratic) 48.6%
Massachusetts 3	Philip J. Philbin	Democratic	1942	Incumbent re-elected.	▌ ✓ Philip J. Philbin (Democratic) 62.2%; ▌Carroll H. Balcom (Republican) 37.8%
Massachusetts 4	Pehr G. Holmes	Republican	1930	Incumbent lost re-election. Democratic gain.	▌ ✓ Harold Donohue (Democratic) 49.5%; ▌Pehr G. Holmes (Republican) 48.5%; ▌Oliver M. Frazer (Prohibition) 2.0%
Massachusetts 5	Edith Nourse Rogers	Republican	1925 (special)	Incumbent re-elected.	▌ ✓ Edith Nourse Rogers (Republican) 71.6%; ▌Oliver S. Allen (Democratic) 28.0%; ▌Harriet Slade (Prohibition) 0.4%
Massachusetts 6	George J. Bates	Republican	1936	Incumbent re-elected.	▌ ✓ George J. Bates (Republican) 70.2%; ▌Richard B. O'Keefe (Democratic) 29.8%
Massachusetts 7	Thomas J. Lane	Democratic	1941 (special)	Incumbent re-elected.	▌ ✓ Thomas J. Lane (Democratic) 60.7%; ▌Ernest Bentley (Republican) 37.8%; ▌Freeman W. Follett (Prohibition) 1.5%
Massachusetts 8	Angier Goodwin	Republican	1942	Incumbent re-elected.	▌ ✓ Angier Goodwin (Republican) 63.5%; ▌Anthony M. Roche (Democratic) 36.5%
Massachusetts 9	Charles L. Gifford	Republican	1922	Incumbent re-elected.	▌ ✓ Charles L. Gifford (Republican) 60.8%; ▌William McAuliffe (Democratic) 37.8%; ▌Grace Farnsworth Luder (Prohibition) 1.4%
Massachusetts 10	Christian Herter	Republican	1942	Incumbent re-elected.	▌ ✓ Christian Herter (Republican) 64.0%; ▌Paul J. McCarty (Democratic) 36.0%
Massachusetts 11	James Michael Curley	Democratic	1942	Incumbent retired to become Mayor of Boston. Democratic hold.	▌ ✓ John F. Kennedy (Democratic) 71.9%; ▌Lester W. Bowen (Republican) 27.1%; ▌Philip Geer (Prohibition) 1.1%
Massachusetts 12	John W. McCormack	Democratic	1928	Incumbent re-elected.	▌ ✓ John W. McCormack (Democratic); Uncontested
Massachusetts 13	Richard B. Wigglesworth	Republican	1928	Incumbent re-elected.	▌ ✓ Richard B. Wigglesworth (Republican) 67.5%; ▌James J. Goode Jr. (Democratic) 32.5%
Massachusetts 14	Joseph Martin	Republican	1924	Incumbent re-elected.	▌ ✓ Joseph Martin (Republican) 63.6%; ▌Martha Sharp (Democratic) 36.4%

== Michigan ==
District	Incumbent			Results	Candidates
District	Incumbent	Party	First elected	Results	Candidates
Michigan 1	George G. Sadowski	Democratic	1942	Incumbent re-elected.	▌ ✓ George G. Sadowski (Democratic) 65.9%; ▌John B. Sosnowski (Republican) 33.4%; ▌Charles L. Dawson (Prohibition) 0.7%
Michigan 2	Earl C. Michener	Republican	1934	Incumbent re-elected.	▌ ✓ Earl C. Michener (Republican) 71.2%; ▌William R. Kelley (Democratic) 28.0%; ▌Clarence DeCan (Prohibition) 0.7%; ▌Robert Cummins (Communist) 0.2%
Michigan 3	Paul W. Shafer	Republican	1936	Incumbent re-elected.	▌ ✓ Paul W. Shafer (Republican) 68.9%; ▌Herschel W. Carney (Democratic) 29.9%; ▌D. D. Gibbons (Prohibition) 1.2%
Michigan 4	Clare Hoffman	Republican	1934	Incumbent re-elected.	▌ ✓ Clare Hoffman (Republican) 72.4%; ▌Harvey Hope Jarvis (Democratic) 26.5%; ▌Ralph C. March (Prohibition) 1.0%
Michigan 5	Bartel J. Jonkman	Republican	1940	Incumbent re-elected.	▌ ✓ Bartel J. Jonkman (Republican) 71.6%; ▌Earle W. Reynolds (Democratic) 28.4%
Michigan 6	William W. Blackney	Republican	1938	Incumbent re-elected.	▌ ✓ William W. Blackney (Republican) 57.3%; ▌Arthur Elliott (Democratic) 42.0%; ▌William H. Morford (Prohibition) 0.7%
Michigan 7	Jesse P. Wolcott	Republican	1930	Incumbent re-elected.	▌ ✓ Jesse P. Wolcott (Republican) 74.2%; ▌Earl J. Tallman (Democratic) 25.0%; ▌Harry Wing (Prohibition) 0.7%
Michigan 8	Fred L. Crawford	Republican	1934	Incumbent re-elected.	▌ ✓ Fred L. Crawford (Republican) 72.6%; ▌J. Charles Mottashed (Democratic) 26.4%; ▌H. T. Green (Prohibition) 1.0%
Michigan 9	Albert J. Engel	Republican	1934	Incumbent re-elected.	▌ ✓ Albert J. Engel (Republican) 71.8%; ▌J. Willard Krause (Democratic) 27.6%; ▌Walker M. Jordan (Prohibition) 0.7%
Michigan 10	Roy O. Woodruff	Republican	1920	Incumbent re-elected.	▌ ✓ Roy O. Woodruff (Republican) 71.2%; ▌Herman N. Butler (Democratic) 28.1%; ▌Floyd Seiter (Prohibition) 0.7%
Michigan 11	Frederick Van Ness Bradley	Republican	1938	Incumbent re-elected.	▌ ✓ Frederick Van Ness Bradley (Republican) 65.9%; ▌Cecil W. Bailey (Democratic) 33.9%; ▌Charles J. Swanson (Prohibition) 0.2%
Michigan 12	Frank Eugene Hook	Democratic	1944	Incumbent lost re-election. Republican gain.	▌ ✓ John B. Bennett (Republican) 54.4%; ▌Frank Eugene Hook (Democratic) 45.2%; ▌August Larson (Prohibition) 0.4%
Michigan 13	George D. O'Brien	Democratic	1940	Incumbent lost re-election. Republican gain.	▌ ✓ Howard A. Coffin (Republican) 52.8%; ▌George D. O'Brien (Democratic) 46.9%; ▌O. Lon Chaney (Prohibition) 0.3%
Michigan 14	Louis C. Rabaut	Democratic	1934	Incumbent lost re-election. Republican gain.	▌ ✓ Harold F. Youngblood (Republican) 53.3%; ▌Louis C. Rabaut (Democratic) 46.3%; ▌A. L. Leach (Prohibition) 0.3%
Michigan 15	John Dingell Sr.	Democratic	1932	Incumbent re-elected.	▌ ✓ John Dingell Sr. (Democratic) 51.9%; ▌Harry Henderson (Republican) 47.7%; ▌Selden D. Kelley (Prohibition) 0.4%
Michigan 16	John Lesinski Sr.	Democratic	1932	Incumbent re-elected.	▌ ✓ John Lesinski Sr. (Democratic) 51.9%; ▌Albert A. Riddering (Republican) 47.1%; ▌Earl A. Johnson (Prohibition) 0.6%; ▌William Allan (Communist) 0.4%
Michigan 17	George A. Dondero	Republican	1932	Incumbent re-elected.	▌ ✓ George A. Dondero (Republican) 64.7%; ▌John W. L. Hicks (Democratic) 34.7%; ▌Don Taylor (Prohibition) 0.5%

== Minnesota ==
District	Incumbent			Results	Candidates
District	Incumbent	Party	First elected	Results	Candidates
Minnesota 1	August H. Andresen	Republican	1934	Incumbent re-elected.	▌ ✓ August H. Andresen (Republican) 68.4%; ▌Karl Rolvaag (DFL) 31.6%
Minnesota 2	Joseph P. O'Hara	Republican	1940	Incumbent re-elected.	▌ ✓ Joseph P. O'Hara (Republican) 76.0%; ▌L. J. Kilbride (DFL) 24.0%
Minnesota 3	William Gallagher	Democratic (DFL)	1944	Incumbent died August 13, 1946. Republican gain.	▌ ✓ George MacKinnon (Republican) 51.5%; ▌Roy Wier (DFL) 47.3%; ▌Warren Creel (Independent) 1.2%
Minnesota 4	Frank Starkey	Democratic (DFL)	1944	Incumbent lost re-election. Republican gain.	▌ ✓ Edward Devitt (Republican) 51.5%; ▌Frank Starkey (DFL) 47.2%; ▌Dorothy Schultz (Independent) 1.3%
Minnesota 5	Walter Judd	Republican	1942	Incumbent re-elected.	▌ ✓ Walter Judd (Republican) 58.3%; ▌Douglas Hall (DFL) 41.7%
Minnesota 6	Harold Knutson	Republican	1934	Incumbent re-elected.	▌ ✓ Harold Knutson (Republican) 57.4%; ▌J. Edward Anderson (DFL) 42.6%
Minnesota 7	H. Carl Andersen	Republican	1938	Incumbent re-elected.	▌ ✓ H. Carl Andersen (Republican) 65.4%; ▌Donald M. Lawson (DFL) 34.6%
Minnesota 8	William Alvin Pittenger	Republican	1938	Incumbent lost re-election. Democratic (DFL) gain.	▌ ✓ John Blatnik (DFL) 57.7%; ▌William Alvin Pittenger (Republican) 42.3%
Minnesota 9	Harold Hagen	Republican	1944	Incumbent re-elected.	▌ ✓ Harold Hagen (Republican) 63.9%; ▌Verner Nelson (DFL) 36.1%

== Mississippi ==
District	Incumbent			Results	Candidates
District	Incumbent	Party	First elected	Results	Candidates
Mississippi 1	John E. Rankin	Democratic	1920	Incumbent re-elected.	▌ ✓ John E. Rankin (Democratic); Uncontested
Mississippi 2	Jamie Whitten	Democratic	1941 (special)	Incumbent re-elected.	▌ ✓ Jamie Whitten (Democratic); Uncontested
Mississippi 3	William Madison Whittington	Democratic	1924	Incumbent re-elected.	▌ ✓ William Madison Whittington (Democratic); Uncontested
Mississippi 4	Thomas Abernethy	Democratic	1942	Incumbent re-elected.	▌ ✓ Thomas Abernethy (Democratic); Uncontested
Mississippi 5	W. Arthur Winstead	Democratic	1942	Incumbent re-elected.	▌ ✓ W. Arthur Winstead (Democratic); Uncontested
Mississippi 6	William M. Colmer	Democratic	1932	Incumbent re-elected.	▌ ✓ William M. Colmer (Democratic); Uncontested
Mississippi 7	Dan R. McGehee	Democratic	1934	Incumbent lost renomination. Democratic hold.	▌ ✓ John Bell Williams (Democratic); Uncontested

== Missouri ==
District	Incumbent			Results	Candidates
District	Incumbent	Party	First elected	Results	Candidates
Missouri 1	Samuel W. Arnold	Republican	1942	Incumbent re-elected.	▌ ✓ Samuel W. Arnold (Republican) 50.3%; ▌Walter G. Stillwell (Democratic) 49.7%
Missouri 2	Max Schwabe	Republican	1942	Incumbent re-elected.	▌ ✓ Max Schwabe (Republican) 51.1%; ▌Will L. Nelson Jr. (Democratic) 48.9%
Missouri 3	William C. Cole	Republican	1942	Incumbent re-elected.	▌ ✓ William C. Cole (Republican) 52.8%; ▌William Orr Sawyers (Democratic) 47.2%
Missouri 4	C. Jasper Bell	Democratic	1934	Incumbent re-elected.	▌ ✓ C. Jasper Bell (Democratic) 55.1%; ▌Vernon D. Fulcrut (Republican) 44.8%; ▌Hodges (Socialist) 0.1%
Missouri 5	Roger C. Slaughter	Democratic	1942	Incumbent lost renomination. Republican gain.	▌ ✓ Albert L. Reeves Jr. (Republican) 53.6%; ▌Enos A. Axtell (Democratic) 46.3%; ▌Demaree (Socialist) 0.06%
Missouri 6	Marion T. Bennett	Republican	1943 (special)	Incumbent re-elected.	▌ ✓ Marion T. Bennett (Republican) 58.6%; ▌Tom B. Hembree (Democratic) 41.4%
Missouri 7	Dewey Short	Republican	1934	Incumbent re-elected.	▌ ✓ Dewey Short (Republican) 65.4%; ▌Don Ervin (Democratic) 34.6%
Missouri 8	A. S. J. Carnahan	Democratic	1944	Incumbent lost re-election. Republican gain.	▌ ✓ Parke M. Banta (Republican) 51.1%; ▌A. S. J. Carnahan (Democratic) 48.9%
Missouri 9	Clarence Cannon	Democratic	1922	Incumbent re-elected.	▌ ✓ Clarence Cannon (Democratic) 53.9%; ▌William Barton (Republican) 46.1%
Missouri 10	Orville Zimmerman	Democratic	1934	Incumbent re-elected.	▌ ✓ Orville Zimmerman (Democratic) 60.6%; ▌Walter K. Dillon (Republican) 39.4%
Missouri 11	John B. Sullivan	Democratic	1944	Incumbent lost re-election. Republican gain.	▌ ✓ Claude I. Bakewell (Republican) 50.7%; ▌John B. Sullivan (Democratic) 49.1%; ▌Foster (Prohibition) 0.2%; ▌Anastasoff (Socialist Labor) 0.07%
Missouri 12	Walter C. Ploeser	Republican	1940	Incumbent re-elected.	▌ ✓ Walter C. Ploeser (Republican) 58.2%; ▌Henry W. Simpson (Democratic) 41.8%; ▌Genck (Socialist Labor) 0.06%
Missouri 13	John J. Cochran	Democratic	1926	Incumbent retired. Democratic hold.	▌ ✓ Frank M. Karsten (Democratic) 54.7%; ▌Alfred L. Grattendick (Republican) 45.2%; ▌Kochendorfer (Socialist Labor) 0.06%

== Montana ==
District	Incumbent			Results	Candidates
District	Incumbent	Party	First elected	Results	Candidates
Montana 1	Mike Mansfield	Democratic	1942	Incumbent re-elected.	▌ ✓ Mike Mansfield (Democratic) 57.6%; ▌Walter R. Rankin (Republican) 42.4%
Montana 2	Wesley A. D'Ewart	Republican	1945 (special)	Incumbent re-elected.	▌ ✓ Wesley A. D'Ewart (Republican) 54.1%; ▌John J. Holmes (Democratic) 45.1%; ▌Edgar M. Spriggs (Socialist) 0.8%

== Nebraska ==
District	Incumbent			Results	Candidates
District	Incumbent	Party	First elected	Results	Candidates
Nebraska 1	Carl Curtis	Republican	1938	Incumbent re-elected.	▌ ✓ Carl Curtis (Republican) 66.4%; ▌William H. Meier (Democratic) 33.6%
Nebraska 2	Howard Buffett	Republican	1942	Incumbent re-elected.	▌ ✓ Howard Buffett (Republican) 58.3%; ▌Frank A. Jelen (Democratic) 41.7%
Nebraska 3	Karl Stefan	Republican	1934	Incumbent re-elected.	▌ ✓ Karl Stefan (Republican) 72.2%; ▌Hans O. Jensen (Democratic) 22.7%; ▌Paul Burke (Independent) 5.1%
Nebraska 4	Arthur L. Miller	Republican	1942	Incumbent re-elected.	▌ ✓ Arthur L. Miller (Republican) 71.3%; ▌Stanley D. Long (Democratic) 28.7%

== Nevada ==
District	Incumbent			Results	Candidates
District	Incumbent	Party	First elected	Results	Candidates
Nevada at-large	Berkeley L. Bunker	Democratic	1944	Incumbent retired to run for U.S. senator. Republican gain.	▌ ✓ Charles H. Russell (Republican) 58.8%; ▌Malcolm McEachin (Democratic) 41.2%

== New Hampshire ==
District	Incumbent			Results	Candidates
District	Incumbent	Party	First elected	Results	Candidates
New Hampshire 1	Chester Earl Merrow	Republican	1942	Incumbent re-elected.	▌ ✓ Chester Earl Merrow (Republican) 59.7%; ▌Josephat T. Benoit (Democratic) 40.3%
New Hampshire 2	Sherman Adams	Republican	1944	Incumbent retired to run for Governor. Republican hold.	▌ ✓ Norris Cotton (Republican) 64.9%; ▌Patrick J. Hinchey (Democratic) 35.1%

== New Jersey ==
District	Incumbent			Results	Candidates
District	Incumbent	Party	First elected	Results	Candidates
New Jersey 1	Charles A. Wolverton	Republican	1926	Incumbent re-elected.	▌ ✓ Charles A. Wolverton (Republican) 63.5%; ▌George F. Neutze (Democratic) 36.5%
New Jersey 2	T. Millet Hand	Republican	1944	Incumbent re-elected.	▌ ✓ T. Millet Hand (Republican) 67.1%; ▌Edward T. Keeley (Democratic) 32.9%
New Jersey 3	James C. Auchincloss	Republican	1942	Incumbent re-elected.	▌ ✓ James C. Auchincloss (Republican) 64.9%; ▌John W. Zimmermann (Democratic) 33.4%; ▌W. Vincent Timberman (Justice) 1.7%
New Jersey 4	Frank A. Mathews Jr.	Republican	1945 (special)	Incumbent re-elected.	▌ ✓ Frank A. Mathews Jr. (Republican) 52.6%; ▌Charles R. Howell (Democratic) 47.4%
New Jersey 5	Charles A. Eaton	Republican	1924	Incumbent re-elected.	▌ ✓ Charles A. Eaton (Republican) 61.3%; ▌John J. George (Democratic) 38.5%; ▌Charles K. Ely (Prohibition) 0.1%
New Jersey 6	Clifford P. Case	Republican	1944	Incumbent re-elected.	▌ ✓ Clifford P. Case (Republican) 64.7%; ▌Walter H. Van Hoesen (Democratic) 33.0%; ▌Margaret Cameron Lowe (Prohibition) 1.5%; ▌Robert Ensel (Communist) 0.8%
New Jersey 7	J. Parnell Thomas	Republican	1936	Incumbent re-elected.	▌ ✓ J. Parnell Thomas (Republican) 69.0%; ▌Robert B. Meyner (Democratic) 31.0%
New Jersey 8	Gordon Canfield	Republican	1940	Incumbent re-elected.	▌ ✓ Gordon Canfield (Republican) 70.5%; ▌John V. Breslin (Democratic) 28.2%; ▌Peter J. Toth (No Foreign Loans) 0.5%; ▌Nathan Liss (Communist) 0.5%; ▌Henry T. Lun (Socialist Labor) 0.4%
New Jersey 9	Harry Lancaster Towe	Republican	1942	Incumbent re-elected.	▌ ✓ Harry Lancaster Towe (Republican) 69.1%; ▌John M. Mehler (Democratic) 30.9%
New Jersey 10	Fred A. Hartley Jr.	Republican	1928	Incumbent re-elected.	▌ ✓ Fred A. Hartley Jr. (Republican) 52.5%; ▌Peter W. Rodino (Democratic) 45.7%; ▌Louise K. Leach (Prohibition) 1.3%; ▌Morton D. Bluestone (Socialist) 0.4%
New Jersey 11	Frank Sundstrom	Republican	1942	Incumbent re-elected.	▌ ✓ Frank Sundstrom (Republican) 60.4%; ▌Robert F. J. McGarry (Democratic) 37.5%; ▌Gertrude L. Riger (Socialist) 1.6%; ▌William E. Bohannon (Socialist Workers) 0.4%; ▌Wesley U. Morris (Prohibition) 0.2%
New Jersey 12	Robert Kean	Republican	1938	Incumbent re-elected.	▌ ✓ Robert Kean (Republican) 63.6%; ▌Raymond C. Connell (Democratic) 34.7%; ▌Alice Ostrow (Socialist) 1.6%; ▌William H. Farrell (Prohibition) 0.2%
New Jersey 13	Mary Teresa Norton	Democratic	1924	Incumbent re-elected.	▌ ✓ Mary Teresa Norton (Democratic) 64.4%; ▌John A. Jones (Republican) 33.7%; ▌Arlene Phillips (Socialist Workers) 1.5%; ▌Sol Potegol (Communist) 0.3%; ▌William S. Dowd ($250 State Bonds) 0.1%
New Jersey 14	Edward J. Hart	Democratic	1934	Incumbent re-elected.	▌ ✓ Edward J. Hart (Democratic) 63.2%; ▌Edward P. Nicolay (Republican) 36.4%; ▌Joseph Fischer (Communist) 0.4%

== New Mexico ==
District	Incumbent			Results	Candidates
District	Incumbent	Party	First elected	Results	Candidates
New Mexico at-large	Antonio M. Fernández	Democratic	1942	Incumbent re-elected.	▌ ✓ Georgia Lee Lusk (Democratic) 26.4%; ▌ ✓ Antonio M. Fernández (Democratic) 26.0%; ▌Earl Douglas (Republican) 24.1%; ▌Herman G. Baca (Republican) 23.5%
New Mexico at-large	Clinton Anderson	Democratic	1940	Incumbent resigned to become U.S. Secretary of Agriculture; Democratic hold.	▌ ✓ Georgia Lee Lusk (Democratic) 26.4%; ▌ ✓ Antonio M. Fernández (Democratic) 26.0%; ▌Earl Douglas (Republican) 24.1%; ▌Herman G. Baca (Republican) 23.5%

== New York ==
District	Incumbent			Results	Candidates
District	Incumbent	Party	First elected	Results	Candidates
New York 1	Edgar A. Sharp	Republican	1944	Incumbent retired. Republican hold.	▌ ✓ W. Kingsland Macy (Republican) 77.3%; ▌Eugene T. O'Neill (Democratic) 22.7%
New York 2	Leonard W. Hall	Republican	1938	Incumbent re-elected.	▌ ✓ Leonard W. Hall (Republican) 78.4%; ▌Josephine U. Mayes (Democratic) 21.6%
New York 3	Henry J. Latham	Republican	1944	Incumbent re-elected.	▌ ✓ Henry J. Latham (Republican) 69.7%; ▌Aloysius J. Maickel (Democratic) 22.6%; ▌Herbert A. Shingler (American Labor) 4.8%; ▌William L. Munger (Liberal) 2.9%
New York 4	William Bernard Barry	Democratic	1935 (special)	Incumbent died October 20, 1946. Republican gain.	▌ ✓ Gregory McMahon (Republican) 53.3%; ▌Emily B. Barry (Democratic) 35.6%; ▌George H. Rooney (American Labor) 6.9%; ▌Nash Starr (Liberal) 4.1%
New York 5	James A. Roe	Democratic	1944	Incumbent retired. Republican gain.	▌ ✓ Robert Tripp Ross (Republican) 53.0%; ▌James A. Phillips (Democratic) 47.0%
New York 6	James J. Delaney	Democratic	1944	Incumbent lost re-election. Republican gain.	▌ ✓ Robert Nodar Jr. (Republican) 53.8%; ▌James J. Delaney (Democratic) 46.2%
New York 7	John J. Delaney	Democratic	1918 (special); 1918 (retired); 1931 (special)	Incumbent re-elected.	▌ ✓ John J. Delaney (Democratic) 57.5%; ▌Roy M. D. Richardson (Republican) 42.5%
New York 8	Joseph L. Pfeifer	Democratic	1934	Incumbent re-elected.	▌ ✓ Joseph L. Pfeifer (Democratic) 53.9%; ▌Paul W. Williams (Republican) 46.1%
New York 9	Eugene Keogh	Democratic	1936	Incumbent re-elected.	▌ ✓ Eugene Keogh (Democratic) 48.6%; ▌Samuel R. Scialabba (Republican) 32.1%; ▌Anthony Scimeca (American Labor) 19.3%
New York 10	Andrew Lawrence Somers	Democratic	1924	Incumbent re-elected.	▌ ✓ Andrew Lawrence Somers (Democratic) 57.9%; ▌Victor Wichum (Republican) 33.8%; ▌August Claessens (Liberal) 8.3%
New York 11	James J. Heffernan	Democratic	1940	Incumbent re-elected.	▌ ✓ James J. Heffernan (Democratic) 60.4%; ▌Alfred C. McKenzie (Republican) 39.6%
New York 12	John J. Rooney	Democratic	1944	Incumbent re-elected.	▌ ✓ John J. Rooney (Democratic) 54.0%; ▌Vincent J. Longhi (Republican) 46.0%
New York 13	Donald L. O'Toole	Democratic	1936	Incumbent re-elected.	▌ ✓ Donald L. O'Toole (Democratic) 53.5%; ▌Charles H. Weadon (Republican) 46.5%
New York 14	Leo F. Rayfiel	Democratic	1944	Incumbent re-elected.	▌ ✓ Leo F. Rayfiel (Democratic) 75.0%; ▌Robert H. Thayer (Republican) 25.0%
New York 15	Emanuel Celler	Democratic	1922	Incumbent re-elected.	▌ ✓ Emanuel Celler (Democratic) 79.4%; ▌Lauri T. Laisi (Republican) 20.4%; ▌Max Shachtman (Workers) 0.2%
New York 16	Ellsworth B. Buck	Republican	1944	Incumbent re-elected.	▌ ✓ Ellsworth B. Buck (Republican) 61.2%; ▌John Burry (Democratic) 38.8%
New York 17	Joseph C. Baldwin	Republican	1941 (special)	Incumbent lost renomination and then lost re-election as third-party nominee. Republican hold.	▌ ✓ Frederic Coudert Jr. (Republican) 57.5%; ▌Myron Sulzberger Jr. (Democratic) 34.2%; ▌Joseph C. Baldwin (American Labor) 8.3%
New York 18	Vito Marcantonio	Labor	1938	Incumbent re-elected.	▌ ✓ Vito Marcantonio (American Labor) 54.2%; ▌Frederick van Pelt Bryan (Republican) 45.8%
New York 19	Arthur George Klein	Democratic	1946 (special)	Incumbent re-elected.	▌ ✓ Arthur George Klein (Democratic) 71.4%; ▌William I. Lehrfeld (Republican) 28.6%
New York 20	Sol Bloom	Democratic	1923 (special)	Incumbent re-elected.	▌ ✓ Sol Bloom (Democratic) 61.1%; ▌Jules J. Justin (Republican) 38.9%
New York 21	James H. Torrens	Democratic	1944	Incumbent retired. Republican gain.	▌ ✓ Jacob Javits (Republican) 46.0%; ▌Daniel Flynn (Democratic) 39.9%; ▌Eugene P. Connolly (American Labor) 14.1%
New York 22	Adam Clayton Powell Jr.	Democratic	1944	Incumbent re-elected.	▌ ✓ Adam Clayton Powell Jr. (Democratic) 62.5%; ▌Grant Reynolds (Republican) 37.5%
New York 23	Walter A. Lynch	Democratic	1940	Incumbent re-elected.	▌ ✓ Walter A. Lynch (Democratic) 43.4%; ▌Peter Wynne (Republican) 25.2%; ▌David A. Schlossberg (American Labor) 20.8%; ▌William Macks (Liberal) 10.6%
New York 24	Benjamin J. Rabin	Democratic	1944	Incumbent re-elected.	▌ ✓ Benjamin J. Rabin (Democratic) 44.2%; ▌Roy Soden (American Labor) 27.2%; ▌David Scher (Republican) 19.0%; ▌Bernice Benedick (Liberal) 9.6%
New York 25	Charles A. Buckley	Democratic	1934	Incumbent re-elected.	▌ ✓ Charles A. Buckley (Democratic) 32.5%; ▌Charles Garside (Republican) 32.3%; ▌Edward V. Morand (American Labor) 17.5%; ▌Ira J. Palestin (Liberal) 10.9%; ▌John A. Dewey Jr. (Veterans) 6.8%
New York 26	Peter A. Quinn	Democratic	1944	Incumbent lost re-election. Republican gain.	▌ ✓ David M. Potts (Republican) 44.1%; ▌Peter A. Quinn (Democratic) 37.3%; ▌Gerald O'Reilly (American Labor) 13.2%; ▌Augustus Batten (Liberal) 5.4%
New York 27	Ralph W. Gwinn	Republican	1944	Incumbent re-elected.	▌ ✓ Ralph W. Gwinn (Republican) 68.5%; ▌Francis X. Nulty (Democratic) 31.5%
New York 28	Ralph A. Gamble	Republican	1937 (special)	Incumbent re-elected.	▌ ✓ Ralph A. Gamble (Republican) 75.4%; ▌Morris Karnes (Democratic) 24.6%
New York 29	Augustus W. Bennet	Republican	1944	Incumbent lost renomination. Republican hold.	▌ ✓ Katharine St. George (Republican) 58.2%; ▌James K. Welsh (Democratic) 38.4%; ▌Bryce Oliver (American Labor) 3.4%
New York 30	Jay Le Fevre	Republican	1942	Incumbent re-elected.	▌ ✓ Jay Le Fevre (Republican) 69.5%; ▌John F. Killgrew (Democratic) 30.5%
New York 31	Bernard W. Kearney	Republican	1942	Incumbent re-elected.	▌ ✓ Bernard W. Kearney (Republican) 59.2%; ▌Carroll A. Gardner (Democratic) 40.8%
New York 32	William T. Byrne	Democratic	1936	Incumbent re-elected.	▌ ✓ William T. Byrne (Democratic) 55.1%; ▌William K. Sanford (Republican) 44.9%
New York 33	Dean P. Taylor	Republican	1942	Incumbent re-elected.	▌ ✓ Dean P. Taylor (Republican) 69.9%; ▌David J. Fitzgerald (Democratic) 30.1%
New York 34	Clarence E. Kilburn	Republican	1940	Incumbent re-elected.	▌ ✓ Clarence E. Kilburn (Republican) 73.0%; ▌William G. Houk (Democratic) 25.4%; ▌Carl H. Bogardus (American Labor) 1.6%
New York 35	Hadwen C. Fuller	Republican	1943 (special)	Incumbent re-elected.	▌ ✓ Hadwen C. Fuller (Republican) 54.3%; ▌Frank A. Emma (Democratic) 45.7%
New York 36	Clarence E. Hancock	Republican	1927 (special)	Incumbent retired. Republican hold.	▌ ✓ R. Walter Riehlman (Republican) 63.3%; ▌Lawson Barnes (Democratic) 36.7%
New York 37	Edwin Arthur Hall	Republican	1939 (special)	Incumbent re-elected.	▌ ✓ Edwin Arthur Hall (Republican) 71.7%; ▌Charles Ray Wilson (Democratic) 28.3%
New York 38	John Taber	Republican	1922	Incumbent re-elected.	▌ ✓ John Taber (Republican) 72.1%; ▌George T. Franklin (Democratic) 27.9%
New York 39	W. Sterling Cole	Republican	1934	Incumbent re-elected.	▌ ✓ W. Sterling Cole (Republican) 72.5%; ▌William Heidt Jr. (Democratic) 27.5%
New York 40	George F. Rogers	Democratic	1944	Incumbent lost re-election. Republican gain.	▌ ✓ Kenneth Keating (Republican) 60.5%; ▌George F. Rogers (Democratic) 39.5%
New York 41	James W. Wadsworth Jr.	Republican	1932	Incumbent re-elected.	▌ ✓ James W. Wadsworth Jr. (Republican) 71.5%; ▌Charles J. Reap (Democratic) 28.5%
New York 42	Walter G. Andrews	Republican	1930	Incumbent re-elected.	▌ ✓ Walter G. Andrews (Republican) 62.5%; ▌William R. Lupton (Democratic) 37.5%
New York 43	Edward J. Elsaesser	Republican	1944	Incumbent re-elected.	▌ ✓ Edward J. Elsaesser (Republican) 62.6%; ▌Charles P. McCabe (Democratic) 33.2%; ▌George J. Young (American Labor) 4.2%
New York 44	John Cornelius Butler	Republican	1941 (special)	Incumbent re-elected.	▌ ✓ John Cornelius Butler (Republican) 57.5%; ▌James B. Downey (Democratic) 42.5%
New York 45	Daniel A. Reed	Republican	1918	Incumbent re-elected.	▌ ✓ Daniel A. Reed (Republican) 70.4%; ▌Joseph E. Proudman (Democratic) 26.7%; ▌Carl William Lundberg (Veterans) 2.9%

== North Carolina ==
District	Incumbent			Results	Candidates
District	Incumbent	Party	First elected	Results	Candidates
North Carolina 1	Herbert Covington Bonner	Democratic	1940	Incumbent re-elected.	▌ ✓ Herbert Covington Bonner (Democratic) 89.2%; ▌Zeno O. Ratcliff (Republican) 10.8%
North Carolina 2	John H. Kerr	Democratic	1923 (special)	Incumbent re-elected.	▌ ✓ John H. Kerr (Democratic); Uncontested
North Carolina 3	Graham Arthur Barden	Democratic	1934	Incumbent re-elected.	▌ ✓ Graham Arthur Barden (Democratic) 66.7%; ▌H. B. Kornegay (Republican) 33.3%
North Carolina 4	Harold D. Cooley	Democratic	1934	Incumbent re-elected.	▌ ✓ Harold D. Cooley (Democratic) 65.7%; ▌Ben L. Spence (Republican) 34.3%
North Carolina 5	John Hamlin Folger	Democratic	1941 (special)	Incumbent re-elected.	▌ ✓ John Hamlin Folger (Democratic) 62.9%; ▌S. Evan Hall (Republican) 37.1%
North Carolina 6	Carl T. Durham	Democratic	1938	Incumbent re-elected.	▌ ✓ Carl T. Durham (Democratic) 63.4%; ▌A. A. McDonald (Republican) 36.6%
North Carolina 7	J. Bayard Clark	Democratic	1928	Incumbent re-elected.	▌ ✓ J. Bayard Clark (Democratic) 73.9%; ▌H. Edmund Rogers (Republican) 26.1%
North Carolina 8	Eliza Jane Pratt	Democratic	1946 (special)	Incumbent retired. Democratic hold.	▌ ✓ Charles B. Deane (Democratic) 54.2%; ▌Joseph H. Whicker (Republican) 45.8%
North Carolina 9	Robert L. Doughton	Democratic	1910	Incumbent re-elected.	▌ ✓ Robert L. Doughton (Democratic) 54.9%; ▌Clyde R. Greene (Republican) 45.1%
North Carolina 10	Sam Ervin	Democratic	1946 (special)	Incumbent retired. Democratic hold.	▌ ✓ Hamilton C. Jones (Democratic) 53.8%; ▌P. C. Burkholder (Republican) 46.2%
North Carolina 11	Alfred L. Bulwinkle	Democratic	1930	Incumbent re-elected.	▌ ✓ Alfred L. Bulwinkle (Democratic) 58.5%; ▌C. Y. Nanney Jr. (Republican) 41.5%
North Carolina 12	Zebulon Weaver	Democratic	1930	Incumbent lost renomination. Democratic hold.	▌ ✓ Monroe Minor Redden (Democratic) 60.5%; ▌Guy Weaver (Republican) 39.5%

== North Dakota ==
District	Incumbent			Results	Candidates
District	Incumbent	Party	First elected	Results	Candidates
North Dakota at-large	William Lemke	Republican-NPL	1942	Incumbent re-elected.	▌ ✓ William Lemke (Republican-NPL) 37.3%; ▌ ✓ Charles R. Robertson (Republican) 36.9%; ▌James M. Hanley (Democratic) 14.9%; ▌Edwin Cooper (Democratic) 10.8%
North Dakota at-large	Charles R. Robertson	Republican	1944	Incumbent re-elected.	▌ ✓ William Lemke (Republican-NPL) 37.3%; ▌ ✓ Charles R. Robertson (Republican) 36.9%; ▌James M. Hanley (Democratic) 14.9%; ▌Edwin Cooper (Democratic) 10.8%

== Ohio ==
District	Incumbent			Results	Candidates
District	Incumbent	Party	First elected	Results	Candidates
Ohio 1	Charles H. Elston	Republican	1938	Incumbent re-elected.	▌ ✓ Charles H. Elston (Republican) 64.2%; ▌G. Andrews Espy (Democratic) 35.8%
Ohio 2	William E. Hess	Republican	1938	Incumbent re-elected.	▌ ✓ William E. Hess (Republican) 63.2%; ▌Francis G. Davis (Democratic) 36.8%
Ohio 3	Edward J. Gardner	Democratic	1944	Incumbent lost re-election. Republican gain.	▌ ✓ Raymond H. Burke (Republican) 52.0%; ▌Edward J. Gardner (Democratic) 48.0%
Ohio 4	Robert Franklin Jones	Republican	1938	Incumbent re-elected.	▌ ✓ Robert Franklin Jones (Republican) 59.2%; ▌Merl J. Bragg (Democratic) 40.8%
Ohio 5	Cliff Clevenger	Republican	1938	Incumbent re-elected.	▌ ✓ Cliff Clevenger (Republican) 60.3%; ▌Willard Thomas (Democratic) 39.7%
Ohio 6	Edward O. McCowen	Republican	1942	Incumbent re-elected.	▌ ✓ Edward O. McCowen (Republican) 54.8%; ▌Franklin E. Smith (Democratic) 45.2%
Ohio 7	Clarence J. Brown	Republican	1938	Incumbent re-elected.	▌ ✓ Clarence J. Brown (Republican) 68.0%; ▌Carl H. Ehl (Democratic) 32.0%
Ohio 8	Frederick C. Smith	Republican	1938	Incumbent re-elected.	▌ ✓ Frederick C. Smith (Republican) 64.0%; ▌John T. Siemon (Democratic) 36.0%
Ohio 9	Homer A. Ramey	Republican	1942	Incumbent re-elected.	▌ ✓ Homer A. Ramey (Republican) 50.1%; ▌Michael V. DiSalle (Democratic) 49.9%
Ohio 10	Thomas A. Jenkins	Republican	1924	Incumbent re-elected.	▌ ✓ Thomas A. Jenkins (Republican) 66.6%; ▌H. A. McCown (Democratic) 33.4%
Ohio 11	Walter E. Brehm	Republican	1942	Incumbent re-elected.	▌ ✓ Walter E. Brehm (Republican) 60.6%; ▌Lester S. Reid (Democratic) 39.4%
Ohio 12	John M. Vorys	Republican	1938	Incumbent re-elected.	▌ ✓ John M. Vorys (Republican) 62.0%; ▌Arthur P. Lamneck (Democratic) 38.0%
Ohio 13	Alvin F. Weichel	Republican	1942	Incumbent re-elected.	▌ ✓ Alvin F. Weichel (Republican) 72.1%; ▌Frank W. Thomas (Democratic) 27.9%
Ohio 14	Walter B. Huber	Democratic	1944	Incumbent re-elected.	▌ ✓ Walter B. Huber (Democratic) 52.6%; ▌Fred W. Danner (Republican) 46.4%; ▌Harry Hurtt Jr. (Independent) 1.0%
Ohio 15	Percy W. Griffiths	Republican	1942	Incumbent re-elected.	▌ ✓ Percy W. Griffiths (Republican) 53.2%; ▌Robert T. Secrest (Democratic) 46.8%
Ohio 16	William R. Thom	Democratic	1944	Incumbent lost re-election. Republican gain.	▌ ✓ Henderson H. Carson (Republican) 55.8%; ▌William R. Thom (Democratic) 44.2%
Ohio 17	J. Harry McGregor	Republican	1940	Incumbent re-elected.	▌ ✓ J. Harry McGregor (Republican) 65.3%; ▌Wesley W. Purdy (Democratic) 34.7%
Ohio 18	Earl R. Lewis	Republican	1942	Incumbent re-elected.	▌ ✓ Earl R. Lewis (Republican) 58.8%; ▌Eugene A. Blum (Democratic) 41.2%
Ohio 19	Michael J. Kirwan	Democratic	1936	Incumbent re-elected.	▌ ✓ Michael J. Kirwan (Democratic) 59.9%; ▌Norman W. Adams (Republican) 40.1%
Ohio 20	Michael A. Feighan	Democratic	1942	Incumbent re-elected.	▌ ✓ Michael A. Feighan (Democratic) 67.0%; ▌Walter E. Obert (Republican) 33.0%
Ohio 21	Robert Crosser	Democratic	1922	Incumbent re-elected.	▌ ✓ Robert Crosser (Democratic) 64.0%; ▌James S. Hudec (Republican) 36.0%
Ohio 22	Frances P. Bolton	Republican	1940	Incumbent re-elected.	▌ ✓ Frances P. Bolton (Republican) 69.1%; ▌Earl Heffley (Democratic) 27.3%; ▌Matthew DeMore (Independent) 3.6%
Ohio at-large	George H. Bender	Republican	1938	Incumbent re-elected.	▌ ✓ George H. Bender (Republican) 59.5%; ▌William M. Boyd (Democratic) 40.5%

== Oklahoma ==
District	Incumbent			Results	Candidates
District	Incumbent	Party	First elected	Results	Candidates
Oklahoma 1	George B. Schwabe	Republican	1944	Incumbent re-elected.	▌ ✓ George B. Schwabe (Republican) 54.5%; ▌Oras A. Shaw (Democratic) 45.5%
Oklahoma 2	William G. Stigler	Democratic	1944	Incumbent re-elected.	▌ ✓ William G. Stigler (Democratic) 63.1%; ▌Ferd P. Snider (Republican) 36.9%
Oklahoma 3	Paul Stewart	Democratic	1942	Incumbent retired. Democratic hold.	▌ ✓ Carl Albert (Democratic) 85.0%; ▌Eleanor L. Watson (Republican) 15.0%
Oklahoma 4	Lyle Boren	Democratic	1936	Incumbent lost renomination. Democratic hold.	▌ ✓ Glen D. Johnson (Democratic) 64.4%; ▌Pliney S. Frye (Republican) 35.6%
Oklahoma 5	Mike Monroney	Democratic	1938	Incumbent re-elected.	▌ ✓ Mike Monroney (Democratic) 52.0%; ▌Carmon C. Harris (Republican) 48.0%
Oklahoma 6	Jed Johnson	Democratic	1926	Incumbent lost renomination. Democratic hold.	▌ ✓ Toby Morris (Democratic) 65.6%; ▌Joe Hart Jr. (Republican) 34.4%
Oklahoma 7	Victor Wickersham	Democratic	1941 (special)	Incumbent lost renomination. Democratic hold.	▌ ✓ Preston E. Peden (Democratic) 78.7%; ▌J. Warren White (Republican) 21.3%
Oklahoma 8	Ross Rizley	Republican	1940	Incumbent re-elected.	▌ ✓ Ross Rizley (Republican) 54.8%; ▌Tom Hieronymus (Democratic) 45.2%

== Oregon ==
District	Incumbent			Results	Candidates
District	Incumbent	Party	First elected	Results	Candidates
Oregon 1	A. Walter Norblad	Republican	1946 (special)	Incumbent re-elected.	▌ ✓ A. Walter Norblad (Republican) 72.0%; ▌Lyman Ross (Democratic) 28.0%
Oregon 2	Lowell Stockman	Republican	1942	Incumbent re-elected.	▌ ✓ Lowell Stockman (Republican) 67.4%; ▌Lamar Townsend (Democratic) 32.6%
Oregon 3	Homer D. Angell	Republican	1938	Incumbent re-elected.	▌ ✓ Homer D. Angell (Republican) 56.7%; ▌Lew Wallace (Democratic) 43.3%
Oregon 4	Harris Ellsworth	Republican	1942	Incumbent re-elected.	▌ ✓ Harris Ellsworth (Republican) 69.2%; ▌Louis Aubrey Wood (Democratic) 30.8%

== Pennsylvania ==
District	Incumbent			Results	Candidates
District	Incumbent	Party	First elected	Results	Candidates
Pennsylvania 1	William A. Barrett	Democratic	1944	Incumbent lost re-election. Republican gain.	▌ ✓ James A. Gallagher (Republican) 57.3%; ▌William A. Barrett (Democratic) 42.7%
Pennsylvania 2	William T. Granahan	Democratic	1944	Incumbent lost re-election. Republican gain.	▌ ✓ Robert N. McGarvey (Republican) 51.4%; ▌William T. Granahan (Democratic) 48.6%
Pennsylvania 3	Michael J. Bradley	Democratic	1936	Incumbent retired. Republican gain.	▌ ✓ Hardie Scott (Republican) 62.1%; ▌Albert S. Townsend (Democratic) 37.9%
Pennsylvania 4	John E. Sheridan	Democratic	1939 (special)	Incumbent lost re-election. Republican gain.	▌ ✓ Franklin J. Maloney (Republican) 50.2%; ▌John E. Sheridan (Democratic) 44.6%; ▌John K. Rice (Citizens) 5.2%
Pennsylvania 5	William J. Green Jr.	Democratic	1944	Incumbent lost re-election. Republican gain.	▌ ✓ George W. Sarbacher Jr. (Republican) 56.9%; ▌William J. Green Jr. (Democratic) 43.1%
Pennsylvania 6	Herbert J. McGlinchey	Democratic	1944	Incumbent lost re-election. Republican gain.	▌ ✓ Hugh Scott (Republican) 58.5%; ▌Herbert J. McGlinchey (Democratic) 41.5%
Pennsylvania 7	James Wolfenden	Republican	1928	Incumbent retired. Republican hold.	▌ ✓ E. Wallace Chadwick (Republican) 66.5%; ▌Vernon O'Rourke (Democratic) 33.5%
Pennsylvania 8	Charles L. Gerlach	Republican	1938	Incumbent re-elected.	▌ ✓ Charles L. Gerlach (Republican) 58.9%; ▌Henry Chapin (Democratic) 41.1%
Pennsylvania 9	J. Roland Kinzer	Republican	1930	Incumbent retired. Republican hold.	▌ ✓ Paul B. Dague (Republican) 72.7%; ▌Edgar Campbell (Democratic) 27.3%
Pennsylvania 10	John W. Murphy	Democratic	1942	Resigned to become judge of Middle District of Pennsylvania. Republican gain. Winner also elected to finish the term; see above.	▌ ✓ James P. Scoblick (Republican) 51.0%; ▌Frank X. Murray (Democratic) 49.0%
Pennsylvania 11	Daniel Flood	Democratic	1944	Incumbent lost re-election. Republican gain.	▌ ✓ Mitchell Jenkins (Republican) 50.8%; ▌Daniel Flood (Democratic) 49.2%
Pennsylvania 12	Ivor D. Fenton	Republican	1938	Incumbent re-elected.	▌ ✓ Ivor D. Fenton (Republican) 62.7%; ▌Ralph M. Bashore (Democratic) 37.3%
Pennsylvania 13	Daniel K. Hoch	Democratic	1942	Incumbent lost re-election. Republican gain.	▌ ✓ Frederick A. Muhlenberg (Republican) 54.6%; ▌Daniel K. Hoch (Democratic) 41.0%; ▌Raymond S. Hofses (Socialist) 4.4%
Pennsylvania 14	Wilson D. Gillette	Republican	1941 (special)	Incumbent re-elected.	▌ ✓ Wilson D. Gillette (Republican) 67.4%; ▌James S. Fields (Democratic) 32.6%
Pennsylvania 15	Robert F. Rich	Republican	1944	Incumbent re-elected.	▌ ✓ Robert F. Rich (Republican) 68.5%; ▌Richard F. Hartzell (Democratic) 31.5%
Pennsylvania 16	Samuel K. McConnell Jr.	Republican	1944	Incumbent re-elected.	▌ ✓ Samuel K. McConnell Jr. (Republican) 74.4%; ▌William L. Batt Jr. (Democratic) 25.6%
Pennsylvania 17	Richard M. Simpson	Republican	1937 (special)	Incumbent re-elected.	▌ ✓ Richard M. Simpson (Republican) 66.2%; ▌Lowell H. Alexander (Democratic) 33.8%
Pennsylvania 18	John C. Kunkel	Republican	1938	Incumbent re-elected.	▌ ✓ John C. Kunkel (Republican) 69.0%; ▌William B. Freeland (Democratic) 31.0%
Pennsylvania 19	Leon H. Gavin	Republican	1942	Incumbent re-elected.	▌ ✓ Leon H. Gavin (Republican) 68.0%; ▌Lloyd N. Hugh (Democratic) 29.8%; ▌R. S. Byers (Prohibition) 2.1%
Pennsylvania 20	Francis E. Walter	Democratic	1932	Incumbent re-elected.	▌ ✓ Francis E. Walter (Democratic) 52.5%; ▌Norman A. Peil (Republican) 47.5%
Pennsylvania 21	Chester H. Gross	Republican	1942	Incumbent re-elected.	▌ ✓ Chester H. Gross (Republican) 52.0%; ▌John W. Brehm (Democratic) 48.0%
Pennsylvania 22	D. Emmert Brumbaugh	Republican	1943 (special)	Incumbent retired. Republican hold.	▌ ✓ James E. Van Zandt (Republican) 65.9%; ▌John A. Shartle (Democratic) 34.1%
Pennsylvania 23	Carl Henry Hoffman	Republican	1946 (special)	Incumbent retired. Republican hold.	▌ ✓ William J. Crow (Republican) 52.9%; ▌John W. Rankin (Democratic) 47.1%
Pennsylvania 24	Thomas E. Morgan	Democratic	1944	Incumbent re-elected.	▌ ✓ Thomas E. Morgan (Democratic) 56.8%; ▌Roy A. Purviance (Republican) 43.2%
Pennsylvania 25	Louis E. Graham	Republican	1938	Incumbent re-elected.	▌ ✓ Louis E. Graham (Republican) 58.8%; ▌Samuel G. Neff (Democratic) 41.2%
Pennsylvania 26	Harve Tibbott	Republican	1938	Incumbent re-elected.	▌ ✓ Harve Tibbott (Republican) 54.6%; ▌Thomas A. Owens (Democratic) 45.4%
Pennsylvania 27	Augustine B. Kelley	Democratic	1940	Incumbent re-elected.	▌ ✓ Augustine B. Kelley (Democratic) 52.9%; ▌Roy C. McKenna (Republican) 47.1%
Pennsylvania 28	Robert L. Rodgers	Republican	1938	Incumbent lost renomination. Republican hold.	▌ ✓ Carroll D. Kearns (Republican) 63.9%; ▌Charles W. Webb (Democratic) 36.1%
Pennsylvania 29	Howard E. Campbell	Republican	1944	Incumbent lost renomination. Republican hold.	▌ ✓ John McDowell (Republican) 53.5%; ▌Harry J. Davenport (Democratic) 46.5%
Pennsylvania 30	Robert J. Corbett	Republican	1938; 1940 (defeated); 1944	Incumbent re-elected.	▌ ✓ Robert J. Corbett (Republican) 60.1%; ▌James W. Knox (Democratic) 39.9%
Pennsylvania 31	James G. Fulton	Republican	1944	Incumbent re-elected.	▌ ✓ James G. Fulton (Republican) 63.8%; ▌Edward A. Schultz (Democratic) 36.2%
Pennsylvania 32	Herman P. Eberharter	Democratic	1936	Incumbent re-elected.	▌ ✓ Herman P. Eberharter (Democratic) 62.8%; ▌Ignatius J. Pillart (Republican) 37.2%
Pennsylvania 33	Frank Buchanan	Democratic	1946 (special)	Incumbent re-elected.	▌ ✓ Frank Buchanan (Democratic) 57.9%; ▌John Robert Brown Jr. (Republican) 42.1%

== Rhode Island ==
District	Incumbent			Results	Candidates
District	Incumbent	Party	First elected	Results	Candidates
Rhode Island 1	Aime Forand	Democratic	1940	Incumbent re-elected.	▌ ✓ Aime Forand (Democratic) 56.7%; ▌Raymond A. Mailloux (Republican) 42.6%; ▌Charles R. Napier (Constitutional Gov.) 0.7%
Rhode Island 2	John E. Fogarty	Democratic	1940	Incumbent re-elected.	▌ ✓ John E. Fogarty (Democratic) 52.7%; ▌John J. Kelly Jr. (Republican) 47.3%

== South Carolina ==
District	Incumbent			Results	Candidates
District	Incumbent	Party	First elected	Results	Candidates
South Carolina 1	L. Mendel Rivers	Democratic	1940	Incumbent re-elected.	▌ ✓ L. Mendel Rivers (Democratic); Uncontested
South Carolina 2	John J. Riley	Democratic	1944	Incumbent re-elected.	▌ ✓ John J. Riley (Democratic); Uncontested
South Carolina 3	Butler B. Hare	Democratic	1938	Incumbent lost renomination. Democratic hold.	▌ ✓ William J. B. Dorn (Democratic); Uncontested
South Carolina 4	Joseph R. Bryson	Democratic	1938	Incumbent re-elected.	▌ ✓ Joseph R. Bryson (Democratic); Uncontested
South Carolina 5	James P. Richards	Democratic	1932	Incumbent re-elected.	▌ ✓ James P. Richards (Democratic); Uncontested
South Carolina 6	John L. McMillan	Democratic	1938	Incumbent re-elected.	▌ ✓ John L. McMillan (Democratic) 96.9%; ▌James R. Prioleau (Progressive) 2.4%; ▌Leroy Dimery (Independent) 0.7%

== South Dakota ==
District	Incumbent			Results	Candidates
District	Incumbent	Party	First elected	Results	Candidates
South Dakota 1	Karl Mundt	Republican	1938	Incumbent re-elected.	▌ ✓ Karl Mundt (Republican) 61.5%; ▌Merton B. Tice (Democratic) 38.5%
South Dakota 2	Francis Case	Republican	1936	Incumbent re-elected.	▌ ✓ Francis Case (Republican) 69.7%; ▌John P. Reinhard (Democratic) 30.3%

== Tennessee ==
District	Incumbent			Results	Candidates
District	Incumbent	Party	First elected	Results	Candidates
Tennessee 1	B. Carroll Reece	Republican	1932	Incumbent retired. Republican hold.	▌ ✓ Dayton E. Phillips (Republican); Uncontested
Tennessee 2	John Jennings	Republican	1939 (special)	Incumbent re-elected.	▌ ✓ John Jennings (Republican) 84.0%; ▌James Douglas Wyrick (Independent) 16.0%
Tennessee 3	Estes Kefauver	Democratic	1939 (special)	Incumbent re-elected.	▌ ✓ Estes Kefauver (Democratic) 90.8%; ▌George Bagwell (Independent) 9.2%
Tennessee 4	Albert Gore Sr.	Democratic	1938	Incumbent re-elected.	▌ ✓ Albert Gore Sr. (Democratic) 67.5%; ▌H. E. McLean (Republican) 32.5%
Tennessee 5	Harold Earthman	Democratic	1944	Incumbent lost renomination. Democratic hold.	▌ ✓ Joe L. Evins (Democratic); Uncontested
Tennessee 6	Percy Priest	Democratic	1940	Incumbent re-elected.	▌ ✓ Percy Priest (Democratic) 77.1%; ▌Will T. Perry (Republican) 22.9%
Tennessee 7	W. Wirt Courtney	Democratic	1939 (special)	Incumbent re-elected.	▌ ✓ W. Wirt Courtney (Democratic); Uncontested
Tennessee 8	Tom J. Murray	Democratic	1942	Incumbent re-elected.	▌ ✓ Tom J. Murray (Democratic); Uncontested
Tennessee 9	Jere Cooper	Democratic	1928	Incumbent re-elected.	▌ ✓ Jere Cooper (Democratic); Uncontested
Tennessee 10	Clifford Davis	Democratic	1940	Incumbent re-elected.	▌ ✓ Clifford Davis (Democratic); Uncontested

== Texas ==
District	Incumbent			Results	Candidates
District	Incumbent	Party	First elected	Results	Candidates
Texas 1	Wright Patman	Democratic	1928	Incumbent re-elected.	▌ ✓ Wright Patman (Democratic); Uncontested
Texas 2	Jesse M. Combs	Democratic	1944	Incumbent re-elected.	▌ ✓ Jesse M. Combs (Democratic) 96.2%; ▌Don Parker (Republican) 3.8%
Texas 3	Lindley Beckworth	Democratic	1938	Incumbent re-elected.	▌ ✓ Lindley Beckworth (Democratic); Uncontested
Texas 4	Sam Rayburn	Democratic	1912	Incumbent re-elected.	▌ ✓ Sam Rayburn (Democratic) 93.7%; ▌Floyd Harry (Republican) 6.3%
Texas 5	Hatton W. Sumners	Democratic	1914	Incumbent retired. Democratic hold.	▌ ✓ J. Franklin Wilson (Democratic) 75.8%; ▌Lewis W. Stayart (Republican) 24.2%
Texas 6	Luther A. Johnson	Democratic	1922	Incumbent resigned when appointed to the U.S. Tax Court. Democratic hold.	▌ ✓ Olin E. Teague (Democratic); Uncontested
Texas 7	Tom Pickett	Democratic	1944	Incumbent re-elected.	▌ ✓ Tom Pickett (Democratic); Uncontested
Texas 8	Albert Thomas	Democratic	1936	Incumbent re-elected.	▌ ✓ Albert Thomas (Democratic) 90.8%; ▌Richard F. Burns (Republican) 9.2%
Texas 9	Joseph J. Mansfield	Democratic	1916	Incumbent re-elected.	▌ ✓ Joseph J. Mansfield (Democratic); Uncontested
Texas 10	Lyndon B. Johnson	Democratic	1937 (special)	Incumbent re-elected.	▌ ✓ Lyndon B. Johnson (Democratic); Uncontested
Texas 11	William R. Poage	Democratic	1936	Incumbent re-elected.	▌ ✓ William R. Poage (Democratic); Uncontested
Texas 12	Fritz G. Lanham	Democratic	1919 (special)	Incumbent retired. Democratic hold.	▌ ✓ Wingate H. Lucas (Democratic) 87.7%; ▌Elton M. Hyder (Republican) 12.3%
Texas 13	Ed Gossett	Democratic	1938	Incumbent re-elected.	▌ ✓ Ed Gossett (Democratic); Uncontested
Texas 14	John E. Lyle Jr.	Democratic	1944	Incumbent re-elected.	▌ ✓ John E. Lyle Jr. (Democratic); Uncontested
Texas 15	Milton H. West	Democratic	1933 (special)	Incumbent re-elected.	▌ ✓ Milton H. West (Democratic); Uncontested
Texas 16	R. Ewing Thomason	Democratic	1930	Incumbent re-elected.	▌ ✓ R. Ewing Thomason (Democratic); Uncontested
Texas 17	Sam M. Russell	Democratic	1940	Incumbent retired. Democratic hold.	▌ ✓ Omar Burleson (Democratic); Uncontested
Texas 18	Eugene Worley	Democratic	1940	Incumbent re-elected.	▌ ✓ Eugene Worley (Democratic) 74.0%; ▌Frank T. O'Brien (Republican) 26.0%
Texas 19	George H. Mahon	Democratic	1934	Incumbent re-elected.	▌ ✓ George H. Mahon (Democratic) 94.6%; ▌Mohler D. Temple (Republican) 5.4%
Texas 20	Paul J. Kilday	Democratic	1938	Incumbent re-elected.	▌ ✓ Paul J. Kilday (Democratic); Uncontested
Texas 21	O. C. Fisher	Democratic	1942	Incumbent re-elected.	▌ ✓ O. C. Fisher (Democratic); Uncontested

== Utah ==
District	Incumbent			Results	Candidates
District	Incumbent	Party	First elected	Results	Candidates
Utah 1	Walter K. Granger	Democratic	1940	Incumbent re-elected.	▌ ✓ Walter K. Granger (Democratic) 50.1%; ▌David J. Wilson (Republican) 49.9%
Utah 2	J. W. Robinson	Democratic	1932	Incumbent lost re-election. Republican gain.	▌ ✓ William A. Dawson (Republican) 52.7%; ▌J. W. Robinson (Democratic) 47.3%

== Vermont ==
District	Incumbent			Results	Candidates
District	Incumbent	Party	First elected	Results	Candidates
Vermont at-large	Charles Albert Plumley	Republican	1934	Incumbent re-elected.	▌ ✓ Charles Albert Plumley (Republican) 64.3%; ▌Matthew J. Caldbeck (Democratic) 35.7%

== Virginia ==
District	Incumbent			Results	Candidates
District	Incumbent	Party	First elected	Results	Candidates
Virginia 1	S. Otis Bland	Democratic	1918	Incumbent re-elected.	▌ ✓ S. Otis Bland (Democratic) 75.0%; ▌Walter Johnson (Republican) 25.0%
Virginia 2	Ralph Hunter Daughton	Democratic	1944	Incumbent lost renomination. Democratic hold.	▌ ✓ Porter Hardy Jr. (Democratic) 65.7%; ▌Sidney H. Kelsey (Republican) 34.3%
Virginia 3	J. Vaughan Gary	Democratic	1945 (special)	Incumbent re-elected.	▌ ✓ J. Vaughan Gary (Democratic) 73.3%; ▌Earle Lutz (Republican) 26.7%
Virginia 4	Patrick H. Drewry	Democratic	1920	Incumbent re-elected.	▌ ✓ Patrick H. Drewry (Democratic) 87.1%; ▌Andrew S. Condrey (Republican) 12.9%
Virginia 5	Thomas G. Burch	Democratic	1930	Appointed to the U.S. Senate. Democratic hold. Winner also elected to finish the term; see above.	▌ ✓ Thomas B. Stanley (Democratic) 73.5%; ▌William L. Creasy (Republican) 26.5%
Virginia 6	J. Lindsay Almond	Democratic	1946 (special)	Incumbent re-elected.	▌ ✓ J. Lindsay Almond (Democratic) 64.8%; ▌Frank R. Angell (Republican) 34.3%; ▌Ruby Mae Wilkes (Socialist) 0.9%
Virginia 7	A. Willis Robertson	Democratic	1932	Incumbent retired to run for U.S. senator. Democratic hold. Winner also elected to finish the term, see above.	▌ ✓ Burr Harrison (Democratic) 62.3%; ▌Karl Jenkins (Republican) 37.7%
Virginia 8	Howard W. Smith	Democratic	1930	Incumbent re-elected.	▌ ✓ Howard W. Smith (Democratic) 62.1%; ▌Lawrence Michael (Republican) 37.9%
Virginia 9	John W. Flannagan Jr.	Democratic	1930	Incumbent re-elected.	▌ ✓ John W. Flannagan Jr. (Democratic) 51.8%; ▌S. H. Sutherland (Republican) 43.1%; ▌John Albert Goodpasture Jr. (Independent) 5.1%

== Washington ==
District	Incumbent			Results	Candidates
District	Incumbent	Party	First elected	Results	Candidates
Washington 1	Hugh De Lacy	Democratic	1944	Incumbent lost re-election. Republican gain.	▌ ✓ Homer Jones (Republican) 63.8%; ▌Hugh De Lacy (Democratic) 36.2%
Washington 2	Henry M. Jackson	Democratic	1940	Incumbent re-elected.	▌ ✓ Henry M. Jackson (Democratic) 53.1%; ▌Payson Peterson (Republican) 46.9%
Washington 3	Charles R. Savage	Democratic	1944	Incumbent lost re-election. Republican gain.	▌ ✓ Fred B. Norman (Republican) 53.9%; ▌Charles R. Savage (Democratic) 46.1%
Washington 4	Hal Holmes	Republican	1942	Incumbent re-elected.	▌ ✓ Hal Holmes (Republican) 67.6%; ▌Earl S. Coe (Democratic) 32.4%
Washington 5	Walt Horan	Republican	1942	Incumbent re-elected.	▌ ✓ Walt Horan (Republican) 61.3%; ▌John T. Little (Democratic) 36.5%; ▌Knute Hill (Ind. Progressive) 2.1%
Washington 6	John M. Coffee	Democratic	1936	Incumbent lost re-election. Republican gain.	▌ ✓ Thor C. Tollefson (Republican) 53.9%; ▌John M. Coffee (Democratic) 46.1%

== West Virginia ==
District	Incumbent			Results	Candidates
District	Incumbent	Party	First elected	Results	Candidates
West Virginia 1	Matthew M. Neely	Democratic	1944	Incumbent lost re-election. Republican gain.	▌ ✓ Francis J. Love (Republican) 53.1%; ▌Matthew M. Neely (Democratic) 46.9%
West Virginia 2	Jennings Randolph	Democratic	1932	Incumbent lost re-election. Republican gain.	▌ ✓ Melvin C. Snyder (Republican) 51.4%; ▌Jennings Randolph (Democratic) 48.6%
West Virginia 3	Cleveland M. Bailey	Democratic	1944	Incumbent lost re-election. Republican gain.	▌ ✓ Edward G. Rohrbough (Republican) 51.5%; ▌Cleveland M. Bailey (Democratic) 48.5%
West Virginia 4	Hubert S. Ellis	Republican	1942	Incumbent re-elected.	▌ ✓ Hubert S. Ellis (Republican) 52.6%; ▌M. G. Burnside (Democratic) 47.4%
West Virginia 5	John Kee	Democratic	1932	Incumbent re-elected.	▌ ✓ John Kee (Democratic) 56.9%; ▌Hartley Sanders (Republican) 43.1%
West Virginia 6	E. H. Hedrick	Democratic	1944	Incumbent re-elected.	▌ ✓ E. H. Hedrick (Democratic) 52.9%; ▌Harold H. Neff (Republican) 47.1%

== Wisconsin ==
District	Incumbent			Results	Candidates
District	Incumbent	Party	First elected	Results	Candidates
Wisconsin 1	Lawrence H. Smith	Republican	1941 (special)	Incumbent re-elected.	▌ ✓ Lawrence H. Smith (Republican) 56.5%; ▌John R. Redstrom (Democratic) 42.8%; ▌Lars P. Christensen (Social-Democratic) 0.7%
Wisconsin 2	Robert Kirkland Henry	Republican	1944	Incumbent re-elected.	▌ ✓ Robert Kirkland Henry (Republican) 62.9%; ▌William G. Rice (Democratic) 36.3%; ▌Ayer T. Wallace (Social-Democratic) 0.9%
Wisconsin 3	William H. Stevenson	Republican	1940	Incumbent re-elected.	▌ ✓ William H. Stevenson (Republican) 96.1%; ▌Walter L. Alexander (Social-Democratic) 3.9%
Wisconsin 4	Thad F. Wasielewski	Democratic	1940	Incumbent lost renomination and then lost re-election as an independent. Republican gain.	▌ ✓ John C. Brophy (Republican) 36.5%; ▌Edmund V. Bobrowicz (Democratic) 33.0%; ▌Thad F. Wasielewski (Ind. Democratic) 28.6%; ▌George E. Helberg (Social-Democratic) 1.8%
Wisconsin 5	Andrew Biemiller	Democratic	1944	Incumbent lost re-election. Republican gain.	▌ ✓ Charles J. Kersten (Republican) 54.1%; ▌Andrew Biemiller (Democratic) 42.3%; ▌Frank P. Zeidler (Social-Democratic) 3.6%
Wisconsin 6	Frank B. Keefe	Republican	1938	Incumbent re-elected.	▌ ✓ Frank B. Keefe (Republican) 64.2%; ▌Edwin W. Webster (Democratic) 34.7%; ▌Rudolph Renn (Social-Democratic) 1.1%
Wisconsin 7	Reid F. Murray	Republican	1938	Incumbent re-elected.	▌ ✓ Reid F. Murray (Republican) 71.6%; ▌Elmer E. Fraley (Democratic) 27.8%; ▌John A. Pearson Jr. (Social-Democratic) 0.6%
Wisconsin 8	John W. Byrnes	Republican	1944	Incumbent re-elected.	▌ ✓ John W. Byrnes (Republican) 64.7%; ▌Martin J. Young (Democratic) 35.3%
Wisconsin 9	Merlin Hull	Progressive	1934	Incumbent re-elected as a Republican. Republican gain.	▌ ✓ Merlin Hull (Republican) 99.0%; ▌Adolph Maassen (Social-Democratic) 1.0%
Wisconsin 10	Alvin O'Konski	Republican	1942	Incumbent re-elected.	▌ ✓ Alvin O'Konski (Republican) 53.0%; ▌Henry J. Berquist (Democratic) 42.4%; ▌Eugene R. Princeton (Independent) 3.9%; ▌Adolph F. Kreie (Social-Democratic) 0.7%

== Wyoming ==
District	Incumbent			Results	Candidates
District	Incumbent	Party	First elected	Results	Candidates
Wyoming at-large	Frank A. Barrett	Republican	1942	Incumbent re-elected.	▌ ✓ Frank A. Barrett (Republican) 56.0%; ▌John J. McIntyre (Democratic) 44.0%

== Non-voting delegates ==
=== Alaska Territory ===
District	Incumbent			This race	
District	Representative	Party	First elected	Results	Candidates
Alaska Territory at-large	Bob Bartlett	Democratic	1944	Incumbent re-elected.	▌ ✓ Bob Bartlett (Democratic) 70.29%; ▌Almer J. Peterson (Republican) 29.71%

== See also ==
- 1946 United States elections
  - 1946 United States Senate elections
  - ▌1946 California's 12th congressional district election (the Richard Nixon-Jerry Voorhis race)
- 79th United States Congress
- 80th United States Congress
