= Leonard W. Schuetz =

American politician

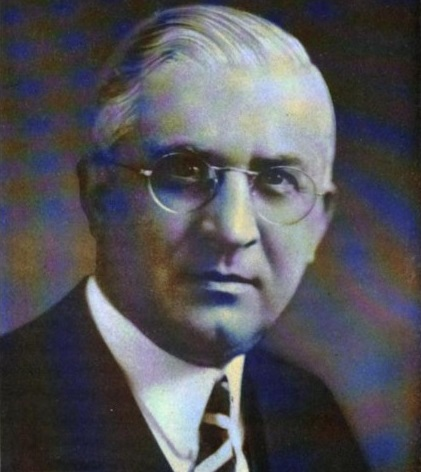
- Frontispiece of 1946's Leonard William Schuetz, Late a Representative

Member of the U.S. House of Representatives from Illinois's 7th district
- In office March 4, 1931 – February 13, 1944
- Preceded by: M. Alfred Michaelson
- Succeeded by: William W. Link

Personal details
- Born: November 16, 1887 Posen, Germany
- Died: February 13, 1944 (aged 56) Washington, D.C., U.S.
- Party: Democratic

Leonard William Schuetz (November 16, 1887 – February 13, 1944) was a U.S. representative from Illinois.

Schuetz was born in Posen, Germany (later Poland), November 16, 1887. In 1888 he immigrated to the United States with his father, who settled in Chicago, Illinois. He attended the public schools, Lane Technical High School, and Bryant and Stratton Business College, Chicago, Illinois. He engaged as a stenographer and secretary until 1906, when he became associated with Swift &amp. Co. in an executive capacity. Organized the Schuetz Construction Co. in 1923 and served as its president and treasurer.

Schuetz was elected as a Democrat to the Seventy-second and to the six succeeding Congresses and served from March 4, 1931, until his death in Washington, D.C., on February 13, 1944. He was interred in St. Adabert's Cemetery, Chicago, Illinois.

== See also ==
- List of members of the United States Congress who died in office (1900–1949)

U.S. House of Representatives
Preceded by M. Alfred Michaelson	Member of the U.S. House of Representatives from Illinois's 7th congressional district March 4, 1931 - February 13, 1944	Succeeded by William W. Link
