= 1945 United States House of Representatives elections =

There were several special elections to the United States House of Representatives in 1945 during the 79th Congress.

== 79th Congress ==
District	Incumbent			This race	
District	Member	Party	First elected	Results	Candidates
Virginia 3	Dave E. Satterfield Jr.	Democratic	1937 (special)	Incumbent resigned. New member elected March 6, 1945. Democratic hold.	▌ ✓ J. Vaughan Gary (Democratic) 48.55%; ▌Ashton Dovell (Democratic) 39.08%; ▌Curtis M. Dozier (Republican) 12.38%
Montana 2	James F. O'Connor	Republican	1936	Incumbent died January 15, 1945. New member elected June 5, 1945. Republican hold.	▌ ✓ Wesley A. D'Ewart (Republican) 50.40%; ▌Leo C. Graybill (Democratic) 42.63%; ▌Robert Yellowtail (Independent) 6.58%; ▌Edgar M. Spriggs (Socialist) 0.39%
Illinois 24	James V. Heidinger	Republican	1940	Incumbent died in office. New member elected November 6, 1945. Republican hold.	▌ ✓ Roy Clippinger (Republican) 98.91%; Others 1.09%
