= 1941 United States House of Representatives elections =

There were elections in 1941, in the months leading up to World War II, to the United States House of Representatives:

District	Incumbent			This race	
District	Member	Party	First elected	Results	Candidates
New York 17	Kenneth F. Simpson	Republican	1940	Incumbent died January 25, 1941. New member elected March 11, 1941. Republican hold.	▌ ✓ Joseph C. Baldwin (Republican) 52.94%; ▌Dean Alfange (Democratic) 37.99%; ▌Eugene P. Connolly (American Labor) 9.07%
Oklahoma 7	Sam C. Massingale	Democratic	1934	Incumbent died January 17, 1941. New member elected April 1, 1941. Democratic hold.	▌ ✓ Victor Wickersham (Democratic) 82.47%; ▌George E. Davison (Republican) 16.61%; ▌J. R. Cornelison (Independent) 0.92%
Virginia 2	Colgate Darden	Democratic	1938	Incumbent resigned March 1, 1941, to run for Governor of Virginia. New member elected April 8, 1941. Democratic hold.	▌ ✓ Winder R. Harris (Democratic) 58.76%; ▌Norman R. Hamilton (Ind. Democratic) 39.25%; ▌Maurice S. McCarty (Independent) 1.59%; ▌Andrew J. Dunning (Prohibition) 0.40%
New York 42	Pius Schwert	Democratic	1938	Incumbent died March 11, 1941. New member elected April 22, 1941. Republican gain.	▌ ✓ John C. Butler (Republican) 40.57%; ▌Hattie E. Schwert (Democratic) 36.51%; ▌Edmund P. Radwan (New Deal) 20.97%; ▌Loyd E. Kinsley (Progressive) 1.95%
Maryland 6	William D. Byron	Democratic	1938	Incumbent died February 27, 1941. New member elected May 27, 1941. Democratic hold.	▌ ✓ Katharine Byron (Democratic) 51.11%; ▌A. Charles Stewart (Republican) 48.89%
North Carolina 5	Alonzo D. Folger	Democratic	1938	Incumbent died April 30, 1941. New member elected June 14, 1941. Democratic hold.	▌ ✓ John H. Folger (Democratic) 96.46%; ▌B. W. Walker (Ind. Republican) 1.97% (write-in); ▌Marshall C. Kurfees (Republican) 1.57% (withdrew)
Alabama 7	Walter W. Bankhead	Democratic	1940	Incumbent resigned February 1, 1941. New member elected June 24, 1941. Democratic hold.	▌ ✓ Carter Manasco (Democratic); Unopposed
New York 14	Morris M. Edelstein	Democratic	1940 (special)	Incumbent died June 4, 1941. New member elected July 29, 1941. Democratic hold.	▌ ✓ Arthur G. Klein (Democratic) 68.02%; ▌George A. Hastings (Republican) 26.35%; ▌Leonard H. Wacker (American Labor) 5.64%
Wisconsin 1	Stephen Bolles	Republican	1938	Incumbent died July 8, 1941. New member elected August 29, 1941. Republican hold.	▌ ✓ Lawrence H. Smith (Republican) 63.62%; ▌Thomas Ryum Amlie (Democratic) 36.38%
Mississippi 2	Wall Doxey	Democratic	1928	Incumbent resigned September 28, 1941, after being elected to the U.S. Senate. New member elected November 4, 1941. Democratic hold.	▌ ✓ Jamie Whitten (Democratic) 69.25%; ▌Luther A. Pyle (Democratic) 30.75%
Pennsylvania 15	Albert G. Rutherford	Republican	1936	Incumbent died August 10, 1941. New member elected November 4, 1941. Republican hold.	▌ ✓ Wilson D. Gillette (Republican) 65.68%; ▌George O. Wagner (Democratic) 43.88%
Colorado 4	Edward T. Taylor	Democratic	1914	Incumbent died September 3, 1941. New member elected December 9, 1941. Republican gain.	▌ ✓ Robert F. Rockwell (Republican) 54.04%; ▌Frank Delaney (Democratic) 45.96%
Massachusetts 7	Lawrence J. Connery	Democratic	1937	Incumbent died October 19, 1941. New member elected December 30, 1941. Democratic hold.	▌ ✓ Thomas J. Lane (Democratic) 58.19%; ▌C. F. Nelson Pratt (Republican) 41.20%; ▌James Jack Green (Communist) 0.61%
