= New York's 45th congressional district =

U.S. House district for New York

Coordinates: 42°15′N 78°40′W

- Obsolete district
- Created: 1945
- Eliminated: 1950
- Years active: 1945–1953

The 45th congressional district of New York was a congressional district for the United States House of Representatives in New York. It was created in 1945 and eliminated as a result of the 1950 census. For the entirety of its existence it was represented by Daniel A. Reed who was redistricted into the 43rd district after its demise.

== List of members representing the district ==
Representative	Party	Years	Cong ress	Electoral history	District location
District established January 3, 1945
Daniel A. Reed (Dunkirk)	Republican	January 3, 1945 – January 3, 1953	79th 80th 81st 82nd	Redistricted from the 43rd district and re-elected in 1944. Re-elected in 1946. Re-elected in 1948. Re-elected in 1950. Redistricted to the 43rd district.	1945–1953; Allegany, Cattaraugus, and Chautauqua
District dissolved January 3, 1953

== Election results ==
=== 1944 ===
1944 New York's 45th congressional district election
Party	Candidate	Votes	%	±%
Republican	Daniel A. Reed (incumbent)	64,456	64.13%	N/A
Democratic	Orrin Hale Parker	36,050	35.87%	N/A
Total votes		100,506	100.00%	
Republican win (new seat)				

=== 1946 ===
1946 New York's 45th congressional district election
Party	Candidate	Votes	%	±%
Republican	Daniel A. Reed (incumbent)	53,327	70.41%	+6.28
Democratic	Joseph E. Proudman	20,205	26.68%	–9.19
Veterans' Victory	Carl William Lundberg	2,208	2.92	N/A
Total votes		75,740	100.00%	
Republican hold				

=== 1948 ===
1948 New York's 45th congressional district election
Party	Candidate	Votes	%	±%
Republican	Daniel A. Reed (incumbent)	58,340	60.14%	–10.27
Democratic	Hubert D. Bliss	35,406	36.50%	+9.82
American Labor	Lewis King	2,093	2.16%	N/A
Liberal	Elmer Olson	1,166	1.20%	N/A
Total votes		97,005	100.00%	
Republican hold				

=== 1950 ===
1950 New York's 45th congressional district election
Party	Candidate	Votes	%	±%
Republican	Daniel A. Reed (incumbent)	54,490	66.00%	+5.86
Democratic	Frederick S. Buck	27,317	33.09%	–3.41
Liberal	Elmer Olson	757	0.92%	–0.28
Total votes		82,564	100.00%	
Republican hold				

== Sources ==
- Martis, Kenneth C. (1989). The Historical Atlas of Political Parties in the United States Congress. New York: Macmillan Publishing Company.
- Martis, Kenneth C. (1982). The Historical Atlas of United States Congressional Districts. New York: Macmillan Publishing Company.
- Congressional Biographical Directory of the United States 1774–present
- Election Statistics 1920-present Clerk of the House of Representatives
