= Thomas L. Owens =

American politician

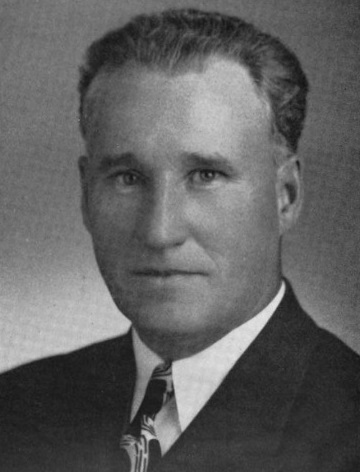
- Frontispiece of 1950's Thomas Leonard Owens, Late a Representative

Member of the U.S. House of Representatives from Illinois's 7th district
- In office January 3, 1947 – June 7, 1948
- Preceded by: William W. Link
- Succeeded by: Adolph J. Sabath

Personal details
- Born: Thomas Leonard Owens; December 21, 1897 Chicago, Illinois, U.S.
- Died: June 7, 1948 (aged 50) Bethesda, Maryland, U.S.
- Party: Republican
- Children: 3

Thomas Leonard Owens (December 21, 1897 – June 7, 1948) was a U.S. representative from Illinois. Born in Chicago, Illinois, Owens attended the parochial schools, Northwestern University and DePaul University, Chicago, Illinois. He was graduated from Loyola University Chicago School of Law in 1926. He was admitted to the bar in 1927 and commenced practice in Chicago, Illinois. During the First World War served in the Students' Army Training Corps at Loyola University Chicago in 1918. He was of Welsh descent.

Active in the Republican Party, Owens was endorsed by ward and township organizations and easily won nomination for the Seventh District seat in 1946. The incumbent was a second-term Democrat and veteran of the Chicago Democratic organization. Owens won by ten points with an attack on the Presidency of Harry S. Truman for turning Poland over to the Soviets. He took his seat in the 80th Congress, where he was a notable gadfly on the floor, always questioning. But he also successfully amended the Taft-Hartley Act and the Mundt-Nixon Bill, both of which he strongly supported. Owens was unopposed for renomination within a radically altered Congressional district. Illinois had finally redrawn the districts that had been in place since 1910. The population was reduced from nearly one million to maybe 400,000.

Owens was not to contest the November 1948 election, however, dying on June 7 after an apparent heart attack on May 23. Stricken in Washington, where the House was still in session, he died in the Naval hospital in Bethesda, Maryland. He was 50 and left a wife and three children in age from five to eighteen. He was interred in All Saints Cemetery in Des Plaines, Illinois.

== See also ==
- List of members of the United States Congress who died in office (1900–1949)

U.S. House of Representatives
| Preceded by William W. Link | Member of the U.S. House of Representatives from Illinois's 7th congressional district 1947-1948 | Succeeded by Adolph J. Sabath |
