= 1944 United States House of Representatives elections in Illinois =

- November 7, 1944

All 26 Illinois seats to the United States House of Representatives
	Majority party	Minority party
Party	Republican	Democratic
Seats won	15	11
Seat change	▼4	▲4
Popular vote	1,939,543	1,933,888
Percentage	50.05%	49.91%
Swing	▼4.0	▲4.0
Democratic
50–60%
60–70%
70–80%
80–90%
Republican
50–60%
60–70%
90–100%

All 26 Illinois seats in the United States House of Representatives were up for election in 1944.

Democrats flipped four Republican-held seats, making the composition of Illinois' House delegation 15 Republicans and 11 Democrats. The Democratic Party flipped the 3rd, 9th, 22nd, and at-large districts.

== Overview ==
2006 United States House of Representatives elections in Illinois
Party	Votes	Percentage	Seats	+/–
Republican	1,939,543	50.05%	15	-4
Democratic	1,933,888	49.91%	11	+4
Independents	1,414	0.04%	0	—
Totals	3,874,845	100.00%	26	—

== District at-large ==
Illinois's at-large congressional district, 1944
Party	Candidate	Votes	%
Democratic	Emily Taft Douglas	2,030,753	52.30
Republican	Stephen A. Day (incumbent)	1,839,518	47.38
Socialist Labor	Walter Klobuchar	6,588	0.17
Prohibition	Elizabeth S. Carr	5,798	0.15
Total votes		3,882,657	100.0
Democratic gain from Republican			

== District 1 ==
=== Democratic primary ===
Democratic primary results
Party	Candidate	Votes	%
Democratic	Bill Dawson (Incumbent)	12,820	53.3
Democratic	Joseph Geary	11,224	46.7
Total votes		24,044	100.0

=== General election results ===
Illinois's 1st congressional district, 1944
Party	Candidate	Votes	%
Democratic	Bill Dawson (Incumbent)	42,713	61.98
Republican	Jimmy Lee Tillman	26,204	38.02
Total votes		68,917	100.0
Democratic hold			
