= William W. Link =

American politician

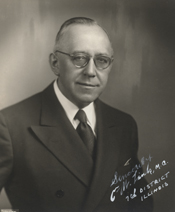

Member of the U.S. House of Representatives from Illinois's 7th district
- In office January 3, 1945 – January 3, 1947
- Preceded by: Leonard W. Schuetz
- Succeeded by: Thomas L. Owens

Personal details
- Born: February 12, 1884 Świecie, Poland
- Died: September 23, 1950 (aged 66) Chicago, Illinois, U.S.
- Party: Democratic

William Walter Link (February 12, 1884 – September 23, 1950) was a U.S. representative from Illinois.

Born in Swiec, Poland, Link immigrated to the United States in 1897 with his parents, who settled in Chicago, Illinois. He attended the parochial and public schools. He attended the department of engineering of Lewis Institute, Chicago, Illinois. He engaged in the enameling business at Chicago, Illinois from 1912 to 1932. He was also interested in banking. He served as president of the Board of Local Improvements, Chicago, Illinois from 1933 to 1936. He served as general secretary of the Polish-American Democratic Organization of Illinois since 1932. Chief clerk of the Superior Court of Cook County in 1942 and 1943. He served as vice president of the Board of Civil Service Commissioners of Cook County, Illinois, in 1943 and 1944.

Link was elected as a Democrat to the Seventy-ninth Congress (January 3, 1945 – January 3, 1947). He was an unsuccessful candidate for reelection in 1946 to the Eightieth Congress. He resumed the banking business as a director of the Manufacturers' National Bank of Chicago. He was also interested in sociological work. He died in Chicago, Illinois, September 23, 1950. He was interred in St. Adelbert's Cemetery.

U.S. House of Representatives
Preceded by Leonard W. Schuetz	Member of the U.S. House of Representatives from Illinois's 7th congressional district 1945-1947	Succeeded by Thomas L. Owens
