= 1937 United States House of Representatives elections =

There were several special elections to the United States House of Representatives in 1937 during the 75th United States Congress.

== List of elections ==
District	Incumbent			This race	
District	Member	Party	First elected	Results	Candidates
Kentucky 2	Glover H. Cary	Democratic	1930	Incumbent died December 5, 1936 after being re-elected. New member elected March 2, 1937. Democratic hold.	▌ ✓ Beverly M. Vincent (Democratic) 96.45%; ▌Mrs Glover H. Cary (Independent) 1.77%; Scattering 1.77%
Texas 10	James P. Buchanan	Democratic	1913 (special)	Incumbent died February 22, 1937. New member elected April 10, 1937. Democratic hold.	▌ ✓ Lyndon B. Johnson (Democratic) 27.7%; ▌Morton Harris (Democratic) 17.1%; ▌Polk Shelton (Democratic) 14.8%; ▌Sam V. Stone (Democratic) 13.5%; ▌C. N. Avery (Democratic) 13.2%; ▌Houghton Brownlee (Democratic) 10.1%; ▌Ayres K. Ross (Democratic) 3.6%
California 10	Henry E. Stubbs	Democratic	1932	Incumbent died February 28, 1937. New member elected May 4, 1937. Democratic hold.	▌ ✓ Alfred J. Elliott (Democratic) 48.9%; ▌Harry A. Hopkins (Republican) 38.7%; ▌Al Sessions (Progressive) 12.4%
Pennsylvania 18	Benjamin K. Focht	Republican	1932	Incumbent died March 27, 1937. New member elected May 11, 1937. Republican hold.	▌ ✓ Richard M. Simpson (Republican) 58.0%; ▌Lowell H. Alexander (Democratic) 42.0%
Massachusetts 7	William P. Connery Jr.	Democratic	1922	Incumbent died June 15, 1937. New member elected September 28, 1937. Democratic hold.	▌ ✓ Lawrence J. Connery (Democratic) 59.0%; ▌Edward Sirois (Republican) 39.6%; ▌Fred G. Bushold (Union) 1.4%
New York 17	Theodore A. Peyser	Democratic	1932	Incumbent died August 8, 1937. New member elected November 2, 1937. Republican gain.	▌ ✓ Bruce F. Barton (Republican) 53.0%; ▌Stanley Osserman (Democratic) 32.4%; ▌George Backer (American Labor) 14.0%
New York 25	Charles D. Millard	Republican	1930	Incumbent resigned September 29, 1937 when elected surrogate of Westchester County. New member elected November 2, 1937. Republican hold.	▌ ✓ Ralph A. Gamble (Republican) 60.9%; ▌Homer A. Stebbins (Democratic) 37.6%; ▌Emil Schlesinger (American Labor) 1.5%
New York 27	Philip A. Goodwin	Republican	1932	Incumbent died June 6, 1937. New member elected November 2, 1937. Republican hold.	▌ ✓ Lewis K. Rockefeller (Republican) 57.2%; ▌Nancy Schoonmaker (Democratic) 42.8%
Virginia 3	Andrew J. Montague	Democratic	1934	Incumbent died January 24, 1937. New member elected November 2, 1937. Democratic hold.	▌ ✓ Dave E. Satterfield Jr. (Democratic) 99.9%
Oklahoma 5	Robert P. Hill	Democratic	1936	Incumbent died October 29, 1937. New member elected December 10, 1937. Democratic hold.	▌ ✓ Gomer G. Smith (Democratic) 74.5%; ▌Harlan Deupree (Republican) 25.2%
Massachusetts 11	John P. Higgins	Democratic	1934	Incumbent resigned September 30, 1937 to become chief justice of the Massachusetts Superior Court. New member elected December 14, 1937. Democratic hold.	▌ ✓ Thomas A. Flaherty (Democratic) 69.6%; ▌John F. Cotter (Republican) 30.4%
