= List of United States representatives in the 79th Congress =

This is a complete list of United States representatives during the 79th United States Congress listed by seniority.

As an historical article, the districts and party affiliations listed reflect those during the 79th Congress (January 3, 1945 – January 3, 1947). Seats and party affiliations on similar lists for other congresses will be different for certain members.

Seniority depends on the date on which members were sworn into office. Since many members are sworn in on the same day, subsequent ranking is based on previous congressional service of the individual and then by alphabetical order by the last name of the representative.

Committee chairmanship in the House is often associated with seniority. However, party leadership is typically not associated with seniority.

Note: The "*" indicates that the representative/delegate may have served one or more non-consecutive terms while in the House of Representatives of the United States Congress.

== U.S. House seniority list ==
U.S. House seniority
Rank	Representative	Party	District	Seniority date (Previous service, if any)	No.# of term(s)	Notes
1	Adolph J. Sabath	D	IL-05	March 4, 1907	20th term	Dean of the House
2	Robert L. Doughton	D	NC-09	March 4, 1911	18th term	
3	Sam Rayburn	D	TX-04	March 4, 1913	17th term	Speaker of the House
4	Hatton W. Sumners	D	TX-05	March 4, 1913	17th term	Left the House in 1947.
5	Carl Vinson	D	GA-06	November 3, 1914	17th term	
6	Harold Knutson	R	MN-06	March 4, 1917	15th term	
7	Clarence F. Lea	D	CA-01	March 4, 1917	15th term	
8	Joseph J. Mansfield	D	TX-09	March 4, 1917	15th term	
9	S. Otis Bland	D	VA-01	July 2, 1918	15th term	
10	Daniel A. Reed	R	NY-45	March 4, 1919	14th term	
11	Fritz G. Lanham	D	TX-12	April 19, 1919	14th term	Left the House in 1947.
12	Patrick H. Drewry	D	VA-04	April 27, 1920	14th term	
13	John E. Rankin	D	MS-01	March 4, 1921	13th term	
14	Roy O. Woodruff	R	MI-10	March 4, 1921; Previous service, 1913–1915.	14th term*	
15	Charles L. Gifford	R	MA-09	November 7, 1922	13th term	
16	Sol Bloom	D	NY-20	March 4, 1923	12th term	
17	Clarence Cannon	D	MO-09	March 4, 1923	12th term	
18	Emanuel Celler	D	NY-15	March 4, 1923	12th term	
19	Robert Crosser	D	OH-21	March 4, 1923; Previous service, 1913–1919.	15th term*	
20	Samuel Dickstein	D	NY-19	March 4, 1923	12th term	Resigned on December 30, 1945.
21	Luther Alexander Johnson	D	TX-06	March 4, 1923	12th term	Resigned on July 17, 1946.
22	John Taber	R	NY-38	March 4, 1923	12th term	
23	Clifton A. Woodrum	D	VA-06	March 4, 1923	12th term	Resigned on December 31, 1945.
24	John H. Kerr	D	NC-02	November 6, 1923	12th term	
25	Edward E. Cox	D	GA-02	March 4, 1925	11th term	
26	Charles Aubrey Eaton	R	NJ-05	March 4, 1925	11th term	
27	Thomas A. Jenkins	R	OH-10	March 4, 1925	11th term	
28	Joseph William Martin Jr.	R	MA-14	March 4, 1925	11th term	
29	Mary Teresa Norton	D	NJ-13	March 4, 1925	11th term	
30	Andrew Lawrence Somers	D	NY-10	March 4, 1925	11th term	
31	William Madison Whittington	D	MS-03	March 4, 1925	11th term	
32	Edith Nourse Rogers	R	MA-05	June 30, 1925	11th term	
33	Richard J. Welch	R	CA-05	August 31, 1926	11th term	
34	John J. Cochran	D	MO-13	November 2, 1926	11th term	Left the House in 1947.
35	Clifford R. Hope	R	KS-05	March 4, 1927	10th term	
36	Jed Johnson	D	OK-06	March 4, 1927	10th term	Left the House in 1947.
37	Malcolm C. Tarver	D	GA-07	March 4, 1927	10th term	Left the House in 1947.
38	Charles A. Wolverton	R	NJ-01	March 4, 1927	10th term	
39	Clarence E. Hancock	R	NY-36	November 8, 1927	10th term	Left the House in 1947.
40	John William McCormack	D	MA-12	November 6, 1928	10th term	
41	Richard B. Wigglesworth	R	MA-13	November 6, 1928	10th term	
42	James Wolfenden	R	PA-07	November 6, 1928	10th term	Left the House in 1947.
43	J. Bayard Clark	D	NC-07	March 4, 1929	9th term	
44	Jere Cooper	D	TN-09	March 4, 1929	9th term	
45	Fred A. Hartley	R	NJ-10	March 4, 1929	9th term	
46	Louis Ludlow	D	IN-11	March 4, 1929	9th term	
47	Wright Patman	D	TX-01	March 4, 1929	9th term	
48	Robert Ramspeck	D	GA-05	October 2, 1929	9th term	Resigned on December 31, 1945.
49	J. Roland Kinzer	R	PA-09	January 28, 1930	9th term	Left the House in 1947.
50	Walter G. Andrews	R	NY-42	March 4, 1931	8th term	
51	Alfred L. Bulwinkle	D	NC-11	March 4, 1931; Previous service, 1921–1929.	12th term*	
52	Thomas G. Burch	D	VA-05	March 4, 1931	8th term	Resigned on May 31, 1946.
53	Virgil Chapman	D	KY-07	March 4, 1931; Previous service, 1925–1929.	10th term*	
54	John W. Flannagan Jr.	D	VA-09	March 4, 1931	8th term	
55	Pehr G. Holmes	R	MA-04	March 4, 1931	8th term	Left the House in 1947.
56	Andrew J. May	D	KY-06	March 4, 1931	8th term	Left the House in 1947.
57	Brent Spence	D	KY-05	March 4, 1931	8th term	
58	Howard W. Smith	D	VA-08	March 4, 1931	8th term	
59	R. Ewing Thomason	D	TX-16	March 4, 1931	8th term	
60	Zebulon Weaver	D	NC-12	March 4, 1931; Previous service, 1917–1919 and 1919–1929.	14th term**	Left the House in 1947.
61	Jesse P. Wolcott	R	MI-07	March 4, 1931	8th term	
62	John J. Delaney	D	NY-07	November 3, 1931; Previous service, 1918–1919.	9th term*	
63	Leo E. Allen	R	IL-13	March 4, 1933	7th term	
64	William M. Colmer	D	MS-06	March 4, 1933	7th term	
65	John D. Dingell Sr.	D	MI-15	March 4, 1933	7th term	
66	Everett Dirksen	R	IL-16	March 4, 1933	7th term	
67	George Anthony Dondero	R	MI-17	March 4, 1933	7th term	
68	John Kee	D	WV-05	March 4, 1933	7th term	
69	John Lesinski Sr.	D	MI-16	March 4, 1933	7th term	
70	James W. Mott	R	OR-01	March 4, 1933	7th term	Died on November 12, 1945.
71	J. Hardin Peterson	D	FL-01	March 4, 1933	7th term	
72	D. Lane Powers	R	NJ-04	March 4, 1933	7th term	Resigned on August 30, 1945.
73	Jennings Randolph	D	WV-02	March 4, 1933	7th term	Left the House in 1947.
74	B. Carroll Reece	R	TN-01	March 4, 1933; Previous service, 1921–1931.	12th term*	Left the House in 1947.
75	James P. Richards	D	SC-05	March 4, 1933	7th term	
76	Absalom Willis Robertson	D	VA-07	March 4, 1933	7th term	Resigned on November 5, 1946.
77	J. W. Robinson	D	UT-02	March 4, 1933	7th term	Left the House in 1947.
78	J. Buell Snyder	D	PA-23	March 4, 1933	7th term	Died on February 24, 1946.
79	James Wolcott Wadsworth Jr.	R	NY-41	March 4, 1933	7th term	
80	Francis E. Walter	D	PA-20	March 4, 1933	7th term	
81	Compton I. White	D	ID-01	March 4, 1933	7th term	Left the House in 1947.
82	Milton H. West	D	TX-15	April 23, 1933	7th term	
83	Paul Brown	D	GA-10	July 5, 1933	7th term	
84	Charles Albert Plumley	R	VT	January 16, 1934	7th term	
85	Harold D. Cooley	D	NC-04	July 7, 1934	7th term	
86	August H. Andresen	R	MN-01	January 3, 1935; Previous service, 1925–1933.	10th term*	
87	Leslie C. Arends	R	IL-17	January 3, 1935	6th term	
88	Graham A. Barden	D	NC-03	January 3, 1935	6th term	
89	C. Jasper Bell	D	MO-04	January 3, 1935	6th term	
90	Charles A. Buckley	D	NY-25	January 3, 1935	6th term	
91	Frank Carlson	R	KS-06	January 3, 1935	6th term	Left the House in 1947.
92	W. Sterling Cole	R	NY-39	January 3, 1935	6th term	
93	Fred L. Crawford	R	MI-08	January 3, 1935	6th term	
94	Albert J. Engel	D	MI-09	January 3, 1935	6th term	
95	Bertrand W. Gearhart	R	CA-09	January 3, 1935	6th term	
96	John W. Gwynne	R	IA-03	January 3, 1935	6th term	
97	Edward J. Hart	D	NJ-14	January 3, 1935	6th term	
98	Sam Hobbs	D	AL-04	January 3, 1935	6th term	
99	Clare Hoffman	R	MI-04	January 3, 1935	6th term	
100	Merlin Hull	R	WI-09	January 3, 1935; Previous service, 1929–1931.	7th term*	
101	George H. Mahon	D	TX-19	January 3, 1935	6th term	
102	Dan R. McGehee	D	MS-07	January 3, 1935	6th term	Left the House in 1947.
103	Earl C. Michener	R	MI-02	January 3, 1935; Previous service, 1919–1933.	13th term*	
104	Emmet O'Neal	D	KY-03	January 3, 1935	6th term	Left the House in 1947.
105	Hugh Peterson	D	GA-01	January 3, 1935	6th term	Left the House in 1947.
106	Joseph L. Pfeifer	D	NY-08	January 3, 1935	6th term	
107	Louis C. Rabaut	D	MI-14	January 3, 1935	6th term	Left the House in 1947.
108	Chauncey W. Reed	R	IL-11	January 3, 1935	6th term	
109	John M. Robsion	R	KY-09	January 3, 1935; Previous service, 1919–1930.	12th term*	
110	Dewey Jackson Short	R	MO-07	January 3, 1935; Previous service, 1929–1931.	7th term*	
111	Karl Stefan	R	NE-03	January 3, 1935	6th term	
112	John H. Tolan	D	CA-07	January 3, 1935	6th term	Left the House in 1947.
113	Orville Zimmerman	D	MO-10	January 3, 1935	6th term	
114	Charles A. Halleck	R	IN-02	January 29, 1935	6th term	
115	Frank W. Boykin	D	AL-01	July 30, 1935	6th term	
116	William Bernard Barry	D	NY-04	November 5, 1935	6th term	Died on October 20, 1946.
117	A. Leonard Allen	D	LA-08	January 3, 1937	5th term	
118	George J. Bates	R	MA-06	January 3, 1937	5th term	
119	Lyle Boren	D	OK-04	January 3, 1937	5th term	Left the House in 1947.
120	Michael J. Bradley	D	PA-03	January 3, 1937	5th term	Left the House in 1947.
121	Overton Brooks	D	LA-04	January 3, 1937	5th term	
122	William T. Byrne	D	NY-32	January 3, 1937	5th term	
123	Francis Case	R	SD-02	January 3, 1937	5th term	
124	Charles R. Clason	R	MA-02	January 3, 1937	5th term	
125	John M. Coffee	D	WA-06	January 3, 1937	5th term	Left the House in 1947.
126	Herman P. Eberharter	D	PA-32	January 3, 1937	5th term	
127	Noble Jones Gregory	D	KY-01	January 3, 1937	5th term	
128	Joe Hendricks	D	FL-05	January 3, 1937	5th term	
129	Edouard Izac	D	CA-23	January 3, 1937	5th term	Left the House in 1947.
130	Pete Jarman	D	AL-06	January 3, 1937	5th term	
131	Eugene James Keogh	D	NY-09	January 3, 1937	5th term	
132	Michael J. Kirwan	D	OH-19	January 3, 1937	5th term	
133	Noah M. Mason	R	IL-12	January 3, 1937	5th term	
134	John R. Murdock	D	AZ	January 3, 1937	5th term	
135	James F. O'Connor	D	MT-02	January 3, 1937	5th term	Died on January 15, 1945.
136	Donald Lawrence O'Toole	D	NY-13	January 3, 1937	5th term	
137	Stephen Pace	D	GA-03	January 3, 1937	5th term	
138	William R. Poage	D	TX-11	January 3, 1937	5th term	
139	Edward Herbert Rees	R	KS-04	January 3, 1937	5th term	
140	Paul W. Shafer	R	MI-03	January 3, 1937	5th term	
141	Harry R. Sheppard	D	CA-21	January 3, 1937	5th term	
142	John Sparkman	D	AL-08	January 3, 1937	5th term	Resigned on November 6, 1946.
143	Albert Thomas	D	TX-08	January 3, 1937	5th term	
144	J. Parnell Thomas	R	NJ-07	January 3, 1937	5th term	
145	Jerry Voorhis	D	CA-12	January 3, 1937	5th term	Left the House in 1947.
146	Lyndon B. Johnson	D	TX-10	April 10, 1937	5th term	
147	Alfred J. Elliott	D	CA-10	May 4, 1937	5th term	
148	Richard M. Simpson	R	PA-17	May 11, 1937	5th term	
149	Ralph A. Gamble	R	NY-28	November 2, 1937	5th term	
150	Dave E. Satterfield Jr.	D	VA-03	November 2, 1937	5th term	Resigned on February 15, 1945.
151	Joe B. Bates	D	KY-08	June 4, 1938	5th term	
152	George M. Grant	D	AL-02	June 14, 1938	5th term	
153	Thomas D'Alesandro Jr.	D	MD-03	January 3, 1939	4th term	
154	Herman Carl Andersen	R	MN-07	January 3, 1939	4th term	
155	Jack Z. Anderson	R	CA-08	January 3, 1939	4th term	
156	Homer D. Angell	R	OR-03	January 3, 1939	4th term	
157	Lindley Beckworth	D	TX-03	January 3, 1939	4th term	
158	George H. Bender	R	OH	January 3, 1939	4th term	
159	William W. Blackney	R	MI-06	January 3, 1939; Previous service, 1935–1937.	5th term*	
160	Frederick Van Ness Bradley	R	MI-11	January 3, 1939	4th term	
161	Clarence J. Brown	R	OH-07	January 3, 1939	4th term	
162	Joseph R. Bryson	D	SC-04	January 3, 1939	4th term	
163	William O. Burgin	D	NC-08	January 3, 1939	4th term	Died on April 11, 1946.
164	Pat Cannon	D	FL-04	January 3, 1939	4th term	Left the House in 1947.
165	Robert B. Chiperfield	R	IL-15	January 3, 1939	4th term	
166	Cliff Clevenger	R	OH-05	January 3, 1939	4th term	
167	Carl Curtis	R	NE-01	January 3, 1939	4th term	
168	Carl T. Durham	D	NC-06	January 3, 1939	4th term	
169	Henry Dworshak	R	ID-02	January 3, 1939	4th term	Resigned on November 5, 1946.
170	Charles H. Elston	R	OH-01	January 3, 1939	4th term	
171	Ivor D. Fenton	R	PA-12	January 3, 1939	4th term	
172	Ezekiel C. Gathings	D	AR-01	January 3, 1939	4th term	
173	Charles L. Gerlach	R	PA-08	January 3, 1939	4th term	
174	George W. Gillie	R	IN-04	January 3, 1939	4th term	
175	Ed Gossett	D	TX-13	January 3, 1939	4th term	
176	Louis E. Graham	R	PA-25	January 3, 1939	4th term	
177	Robert A. Grant	R	IN-03	January 3, 1939	4th term	
178	Leonard W. Hall	R	NY-02	January 3, 1939	4th term	
179	Butler B. Hare	D	SC-03	January 3, 1939; Previous service, 1925–1933.	8th term*	Left the House in 1947.
180	Forest Harness	R	IN-05	January 3, 1939	4th term	
181	William E. Hess	R	OH-02	January 3, 1939; Previous service, 1929–1937.	8th term*	
182	John Carl Hinshaw	R	CA-20	January 3, 1939	4th term	
183	Ben F. Jensen	R	IA-07	January 3, 1939	4th term	
184	Anton J. Johnson	R	IL-14	January 3, 1939	4th term	
185	Noble J. Johnson	R	IN-06	January 3, 1939; Previous service, 1925–1931.	10th term*	
186	Robert Franklin Jones	R	OH-04	January 3, 1939	4th term	
187	Robert Kean	R	NJ-12	January 3, 1939	4th term	
188	Frank Bateman Keefe	R	WI-06	January 3, 1939	4th term	
189	Paul J. Kilday	D	TX-20	January 3, 1939	4th term	
190	John C. Kunkel	R	PA-18	January 3, 1939	4th term	
191	Gerald W. Landis	R	IN-07	January 3, 1939	4th term	
192	Karl M. LeCompte	R	IA-04	January 3, 1939	4th term	
193	Vito Marcantonio	ALP	NY-18	January 3, 1939; Previous service, 1935–1937.	5th term*	
194	Thomas E. Martin	R	IA-01	January 3, 1939	4th term	
195	John L. McMillan	D	SC-06	January 3, 1939	4th term	
196	Wilbur Mills	D	AR-02	January 3, 1939	4th term	
197	Mike Monroney	D	OK-05	January 3, 1939	4th term	
198	Karl E. Mundt	R	SD-01	January 3, 1939	4th term	
199	Reid F. Murray	R	WI-07	January 3, 1939	4th term	
200	William F. Norrell	D	AR-06	January 3, 1939	4th term	
201	William Alvin Pittenger	R	MN-08	January 3, 1939; Previous service, 1929–1933 and 1935–1937.	7th term**	Left the House in 1947.
202	Robert L. Rodgers	R	PA-28	January 3, 1939	4th term	Left the House in 1947.
203	Frederick Cleveland Smith	R	OH-08	January 3, 1939	4th term	
204	Raymond S. Springer	R	IN-10	January 3, 1939	4th term	
205	Jessie Sumner	R	IL-18	January 3, 1939	4th term	Left the House in 1947.
206	Henry O. Talle	R	IA-02	January 3, 1939	4th term	
207	Harve Tibbott	R	PA-26	January 3, 1939	4th term	
208	Thomas Daniel Winter	R	KS-03	January 3, 1939	4th term	Left the House in 1947.
209	John Martin Vorys	R	OH-12	January 3, 1939	4th term	
210	Lansdale Ghiselin Sasscer	D	MD-05	February 3, 1939	4th term	
211	W. Wirt Courtney	D	TN-07	May 11, 1939	4th term	
212	Albert Sidney Camp	D	GA-04	August 1, 1939	4th term	
213	William Fadjo Cravens	D	AR-04	September 12, 1939	4th term	
214	Estes Kefauver	D	TN-03	September 13, 1939	4th term	
215	Edwin Arthur Hall	R	NY-37	November 7, 1939	4th term	
216	John E. Sheridan	D	PA-04	November 7, 1939	4th term	Left the House in 1947.
217	John Jennings	R	TN-02	December 30, 1939	4th term	
218	Clarence E. Kilburn	R	NY-34	February 13, 1940	4th term	
219	Clifford Davis	D	TN-10	February 14, 1940	4th term	
220	Bartel J. Jonkman	R	MI-05	February 19, 1940	4th term	
221	Walter A. Lynch	D	NY-23	February 20, 1940	4th term	
222	Frances P. Bolton	R	OH-22	February 27, 1940	4th term	
223	J. Harry McGregor	R	OH-17	February 27, 1940	4th term	
224	Margaret Chase Smith	R	ME-02	June 3, 1940	4th term	
225	Herbert Covington Bonner	D	NC-01	November 5, 1940	4th term	
226	Clinton Presba Anderson	D	NM	January 3, 1941	3rd term	Resigned on June 30, 1945.
227	C. W. Bishop	R	IL-25	January 3, 1941	3rd term	
228	Gordon Canfield	R	NJ-08	January 3, 1941	3rd term	
229	John Chenoweth	R	CO-03	January 3, 1941	3rd term	
230	Paul Cunningham	R	IA-05	January 3, 1941	3rd term	
231	Frank Fellows	R	ME-03	January 3, 1941	3rd term	
232	Aime Forand	D	RI-01	January 3, 1941; Previous service, 1937–1939.	4th term*	
233	John S. Gibson	D	GA-08	January 3, 1941	3rd term	Left the House in 1947.
234	Walter K. Granger	D	UT-01	January 3, 1941	3rd term	
235	Oren Harris	D	AR-07	January 3, 1941	3rd term	
236	Felix Edward Hébert	D	LA-01	January 3, 1941	3rd term	
237	James J. Heffernan	D	NY-11	January 3, 1941	3rd term	
238	James V. Heidinger	R	IL-24	January 3, 1941	3rd term	Died on March 22, 1945.
239	William S. Hill	R	CO-02	January 3, 1941	3rd term	
240	George Evan Howell	R	IL-21	January 3, 1941	3rd term	
241	Henry M. Jackson	D	WA-02	January 3, 1941	3rd term	
242	Augustine B. Kelley	D	PA-27	January 3, 1941	3rd term	
243	George D. O'Brien	D	MI-13	January 3, 1941; Previous service, 1937–1939.	4th term*	Left the House in 1947.
244	Joseph O'Hara	R	MN-02	January 3, 1941	3rd term	
245	Walter C. Ploeser	R	MO-12	January 3, 1941	3rd term	
246	Percy Priest	D	TN-06	January 3, 1941	3rd term	
247	L. Mendel Rivers	D	SC-01	January 3, 1941	3rd term	
248	Ross Rizley	R	OK-08	January 3, 1941	3rd term	
249	Sam M. Russell	D	TX-17	January 3, 1941	3rd term	Left the House in 1947.
250	William H. Stevenson	R	WI-03	January 3, 1941	3rd term	
251	Thaddeus Wasielewski	D	WI-04	January 3, 1941	3rd term	Left the House in 1947.
252	Samuel A. Weiss	D	PA-33	January 3, 1941	3rd term	Resigned on January 7, 1946.
253	Earl Wilson	R	IN-09	January 3, 1941	3rd term	
254	Eugene Worley	D	TX-18	January 3, 1941	3rd term	
255	Joseph C. Baldwin	R	NY-17	March 11, 1941	3rd term	Left the House in 1947.
256	Victor Wickersham	D	OK-07	April 1, 1941	3rd term	Left the House in 1947.
257	John Cornelius Butler	R	NY-44	April 22, 1941	3rd term	
258	John Hamlin Folger	D	NC-05	June 14, 1941	3rd term	
259	Carter Manasco	D	AL-07	June 24, 1941	3rd term	
260	Lawrence H. Smith	R	WI-01	August 29, 1941	3rd term	
261	Wilson D. Gillette	R	PA-14	November 4, 1941	3rd term	
262	Jamie Whitten	D	MS-02	November 4, 1941	3rd term	
263	Robert F. Rockwell	R	CO-04	December 9, 1941	3rd term	
264	Thomas J. Lane	D	MA-07	December 30, 1941	3rd term	
265	Joseph E. Talbot	R	CT-05	January 20, 1942	3rd term	Left the House in 1947.
266	Cecil R. King	D	CA-17	August 25, 1942	3rd term	
267	Thomas Abernethy	D	MS-04	January 3, 1943	2nd term	
268	Samuel W. Arnold	R	MO-01	January 3, 1943	2nd term	
269	James C. Auchincloss	R	NJ-03	January 3, 1943	2nd term	
270	Harry Streett Baldwin	D	MD-02	January 3, 1943	2nd term	Left the House in 1947.
271	Frank A. Barrett	R	WY	January 3, 1943	2nd term	
272	James Glenn Beall	R	MD-06	January 3, 1943	2nd term	
273	Walter E. Brehm	R	OH-11	January 3, 1943	2nd term	
274	Howard Buffett	R	NE-02	January 3, 1943	2nd term	
275	Ralph E. Church	R	IL-10	January 3, 1943; Previous service, 1935–1941.	5th term*	
276	William Clay Cole	R	MO-03	January 3, 1943	2nd term	
277	James Michael Curley	D	MA-11	January 3, 1943; Previous service, 1911–1914.	4th term*	Left the House in 1947.
278	William L. Dawson	D	IL-01	January 3, 1943	2nd term	
279	Hubert S. Ellis	R	WV-04	January 3, 1943	2nd term	
280	Harris Ellsworth	R	OR-04	January 3, 1943	2nd term	
281	Michael A. Feighan	D	OH-20	January 3, 1943	2nd term	
282	Antonio M. Fernández	D	NM	January 3, 1943	2nd term	
283	O. C. Fisher	D	TX-21	January 3, 1943	2nd term	
284	Leon H. Gavin	R	PA-19	January 3, 1943	2nd term	
285	Angier Goodwin	R	MA-08	January 3, 1943	2nd term	
286	Thomas S. Gordon	D	IL-08	January 3, 1943	2nd term	
287	Martin Gorski	D	IL-04	January 3, 1943	2nd term	
288	Percy W. Griffiths	R	OH-15	January 3, 1943	2nd term	
289	Chester H. Gross	R	PA-21	January 3, 1943; Previous service, 1939–1941.	3rd term*	
290	Harold Hagen	R	MN-09	January 3, 1943	2nd term	
291	Robert Hale	R	ME-01	January 3, 1943	2nd term	
292	Richard F. Harless	D	AZ	January 3, 1943	2nd term	
293	Brooks Hays	D	AR-05	January 3, 1943	2nd term	
294	Christian Herter	R	MA-10	January 3, 1943	2nd term	
295	Daniel K. Hoch	D	PA-13	January 3, 1943	2nd term	Left the House in 1947.
296	Charles B. Hoeven	R	IA-08	January 3, 1943	2nd term	
297	Chester E. Holifield	D	CA-19	January 3, 1943	2nd term	
298	Hal Holmes	R	WA-04	January 3, 1943	2nd term	
299	Walt Horan	R	WA-05	January 3, 1943	2nd term	
300	Justin L. Johnson	R	CA-03	January 3, 1943	2nd term	
301	Walter Judd	R	MN-05	January 3, 1943	2nd term	
302	Bernard W. Kearney	R	NY-31	January 3, 1943	2nd term	
303	Charles M. La Follette	R	IN-08	January 3, 1943	2nd term	Left the House in 1947.
304	Henry D. Larcade Jr.	D	LA-07	January 3, 1943	2nd term	
305	William Lemke	R	ND	January 3, 1943; Previous service, 1933–1941.	6th term*	
306	Jay Le Fevre	R	NY-30	January 3, 1943	2nd term	
307	Earl R. Lewis	R	OH-18	January 3, 1943; Previous service, 1939–1941.	3rd term*	
308	Clare Boothe Luce	R	CT-04	January 3, 1943	2nd term	Left the House in 1947.
309	Ray Madden	D	IN-01	January 3, 1943	2nd term	
310	Paul H. Maloney	D	LA-02	January 3, 1943; Previous service, 1931–1940.	7th term*	Left the House in 1947.
311	Mike Mansfield	D	MT-01	January 3, 1943	2nd term	
312	Edward Oscar McCowen	R	OH-06	January 3, 1943	2nd term	
313	Charles E. McKenzie	D	LA-05	January 3, 1943	2nd term	Left the House in 1947.
314	Chester Earl Merrow	R	NH-01	January 3, 1943	2nd term	
315	Arthur L. Miller	R	NE-04	January 3, 1943	2nd term	
316	James H. Morrison	D	LA-06	January 3, 1943	2nd term	
317	Tom J. Murray	D	TN-08	January 3, 1943	2nd term	
318	John W. Murphy	D	PA-10	January 3, 1943	2nd term	Resigned on July 17, 1946.
319	Thomas J. O'Brien	D	IL-06	January 3, 1943; Previous service, 1933–1939.	5th term*	
320	Alvin O'Konski	R	WI-10	January 3, 1943	2nd term	
321	George E. Outland	D	CA-11	January 3, 1943	2nd term	Left the House in 1947.
322	Philip J. Philbin	D	MA-03	January 3, 1943	2nd term	
323	John J. Phillips	R	CA-22	January 3, 1943	2nd term	
324	Emory H. Price	D	FL-02	January 3, 1943	2nd term	
325	Homer A. Ramey	R	OH-09	January 3, 1943	2nd term	
326	William A. Rowan	D	IL-02	January 3, 1943	2nd term	Left the House in 1947.
327	George G. Sadowski	D	MI-01	January 3, 1943; Previous service, 1933–1939.	5th term*	
328	Max Schwabe	R	MO-02	January 3, 1943	2nd term	
329	Sid Simpson	R	IL-20	January 3, 1943	2nd term	
330	Roger C. Slaughter	D	MO-05	January 3, 1943	2nd term	Left the House in 1947.
331	Paul Stewart	D	OK-03	January 3, 1943	2nd term	Left the House in 1947.
332	Lowell Stockman	R	OR-02	January 3, 1943	2nd term	
333	Frank Sundstrom	R	NJ-11	January 3, 1943	2nd term	
334	Dean P. Taylor	R	NY-33	January 3, 1943	2nd term	
335	Harry Lancaster Towe	R	NJ-09	January 3, 1943	2nd term	
336	Charles W. Vursell	R	IL-23	January 3, 1943	2nd term	
337	Alvin F. Weichel	R	OH-13	January 3, 1943	2nd term	
338	W. Arthur Winstead	D	MS-05	January 3, 1943	2nd term	
339	Marion T. Bennett	R	MO-06	January 12, 1943	2nd term	
340	Clair Engle	D	CA-02	August 31, 1943	2nd term	
341	Errett P. Scrivner	R	KS-02	September 14, 1943	2nd term	
342	D. Emmert Brumbaugh	R	PA-22	November 2, 1943	2nd term	Left the House in 1947.
343	Hadwen C. Fuller	R	NY-35	November 2, 1943	2nd term	
344	Samuel K. McConnell Jr.	R	PA-16	January 18, 1944	2nd term	
345	James H. Torrens	D	NY-21	February 29, 1944	2nd term	Left the House in 1947.
346	Dean M. Gillespie	R	CO-01	March 7, 1944	2nd term	Left the House in 1947.
347	George W. Andrews	D	AL-03	March 14, 1944	2nd term	
348	William G. Stigler	D	OK-02	March 28, 1944	2nd term	
349	Ellsworth B. Buck	R	NY-16	June 6, 1944	2nd term	
350	John J. Rooney	D	NY-12	June 6, 1944	2nd term	
351	Rolla C. McMillen	R	IL-19	June 13, 1944	2nd term	
352	Ralph Hunter Daughton	D	VA-02	November 7, 1944	2nd term	Left the House in 1947.
353	James R. Domengeaux	D	LA-03	November 7, 1944; Previous service, 1941–1944.	3rd term*	
354	Sherman Adams	R	NH-02	January 3, 1945	1st term	Left the House in 1947.
355	Cleveland M. Bailey	D	WV-03	January 3, 1945	1st term	Left the House in 1947.
356	William A. Barrett	D	PA-01	January 3, 1945	1st term	Left the House in 1947.
357	Augustus W. Bennet	R	NY-29	January 3, 1945	1st term	Left the House in 1947.
358	Andrew Biemiller	D	WI-05	January 3, 1945	1st term	Left the House in 1947.
359	Berkeley L. Bunker	D	NV	January 3, 1945	1st term	Left the House in 1947.
360	John W. Byrnes	R	WI-08	January 3, 1945	1st term	
361	Howard E. Campbell	R	PA-29	January 3, 1945	1st term	Left the House in 1947.
362	A. S. J. Carnahan	D	MO-08	January 3, 1945	1st term	Left the House in 1947.
363	Clifford P. Case	R	NJ-06	January 3, 1945	1st term	
364	Frank Chelf	D	KY-04	January 3, 1945	1st term	
365	Earle C. Clements	D	KY-02	January 3, 1945	1st term	
366	Albert M. Cole	R	KS-01	January 3, 1945	1st term	
367	Jesse M. Combs	D	TX-02	January 3, 1945	1st term	
368	Robert J. Corbett	R	PA-30	January 3, 1945; Previous service, 1939–1941.	2nd term*	
369	James J. Delaney	D	NY-06	January 3, 1945	1st term	Left the House in 1947.
370	James I. Dolliver	R	IA-06	January 3, 1945	1st term	
371	Emily Taft Douglas	D	IL	January 3, 1945	1st term	Left the House in 1947.
372	Helen Gahagan Douglas	D	CA-14	January 3, 1945	1st term	
373	Clyde Doyle	D	CA-18	January 3, 1945	1st term	Left the House in 1947.
374	Harold Earthman	D	TN-05	January 3, 1945	1st term	Left the House in 1947.
375	Edward J. Elsaesser	R	NY-43	January 3, 1945	1st term	
376	Joseph Wilson Ervin	D	NC-10	January 3, 1945	1st term	Died on December 25, 1945.
377	George Hyde Fallon	D	MD-04	January 3, 1945	1st term	
378	Daniel J. Flood	D	PA-11	January 3, 1945	1st term	Left the House in 1947.
379	James G. Fulton	R	PA-31	January 3, 1945	1st term	
380	William Gallagher	D	MN-03	January 3, 1945	1st term	Died on August 13, 1946.
381	Edward Joseph Gardner	D	OH-03	January 3, 1945	1st term	Left the House in 1947.
382	James P. Geelan	D	CT-03	January 3, 1945	1st term	Left the House in 1947.
383	William T. Granahan	D	PA-02	January 3, 1945	1st term	Left the House in 1947.
384	William J. Green Jr.	D	PA-05	January 3, 1945	1st term	Left the House in 1947.
385	Albert A. Gore Sr.	D	TN-04	January 3, 1945; Previous service, 1939–1944.	4th term*	
386	Ralph W. Gwinn	R	NY-27	January 3, 1945	1st term	
387	T. Millet Hand	R	NJ-02	January 3, 1945	1st term	
388	Franck R. Havenner	P	CA-04	January 3, 1945; Previous service, 1937–1941.	3rd term*	
389	Ned R. Healy	D	CA-13	January 3, 1945	1st term	Left the House in 1947.
390	E. H. Hedrick	D	WV-06	January 3, 1945	1st term	
391	Robert Kirkland Henry	R	WI-02	January 3, 1945	1st term	Died on November 20, 1946.
392	John W. Heselton	R	MA-01	January 3, 1945	1st term	
393	Frank Eugene Hook	D	MI-12	January 3, 1945; Previous service, 1935–1943.	5th term*	Left the House in 1947.
394	Walter B. Huber	D	OH-14	January 3, 1945	1st term	
395	Edward A. Kelly	D	IL-03	January 3, 1945; Previous service, 1931–1943.	7th term*	Left the House in 1947.
396	Herman P. Kopplemann	D	CT-01	January 3, 1945; Previous service, 1933–1939 and 1941–1943.	5th term**	Left the House in 1947.
397	Hugh De Lacy	D	WA-01	January 3, 1945	1st term	Left the House in 1947.
398	Henry J. Latham	R	NY-03	January 3, 1945	1st term	
399	William W. Link	D	IL-07	January 3, 1945	1st term	Left the House in 1947.
400	John E. Lyle Jr.	D	TX-14	January 3, 1945	1st term	
401	Gordon L. McDonough	R	CA-15	January 3, 1945	1st term	
402	Herbert J. McGlinchey	D	PA-06	January 3, 1945	1st term	Left the House in 1947.
403	George Paul Miller	D	CA-06	January 3, 1945	1st term	
404	Thomas E. Morgan	D	PA-24	January 3, 1945	1st term	
405	Matthew M. Neely	D	WV-01	January 3, 1945; Previous service, 1913–1921.	5th term*	Left the House in 1947.
406	Luther Patrick	D	AL-09	January 3, 1945; Previous service, 1937–1943.	4th term*	Left the House in 1947.
407	Ellis E. Patterson	D	CA-16	January 3, 1945	1st term	Left the House in 1947.
408	Tom Pickett	D	TX-07	January 3, 1945	1st term	
409	Adam Clayton Powell Jr.	D	NY-22	January 3, 1945	1st term	
410	Charles Melvin Price	D	IL-22	January 3, 1945	1st term	
411	Peter A. Quinn	D	NY-26	January 3, 1945	1st term	Left the House in 1947.
412	Benjamin J. Rabin	D	NY-24	January 3, 1945	1st term	
413	Albert Rains	D	AL-05	January 3, 1945	1st term	
414	Leo F. Rayfiel	D	NY-14	January 3, 1945	1st term	
415	Alexander J. Resa	D	IL-09	January 3, 1945	1st term	Left the House in 1947.
416	Robert F. Rich	R	PA-15	January 3, 1945; Previous service, 1930–1943.	8th term*	
417	John J. Riley	D	SC-02	January 3, 1945	1st term	
418	Charles R. Robertson	R	ND	January 3, 1945; Previous service, 1941–1943.	2nd term*	
419	Dudley Roe	D	MD-01	January 3, 1945	1st term	Left the House in 1947.
420	James A. Roe	D	NY-05	January 3, 1945	1st term	Left the House in 1947.
421	Dwight L. Rogers	D	FL-06	January 3, 1945	1st term	
422	George F. Rogers	D	NY-40	January 3, 1945	1st term	Left the House in 1947.
423	Joseph F. Ryter	D	CT	January 3, 1945	1st term	Left the House in 1947.
424	Charles R. Savage	D	WA-03	January 3, 1945	1st term	Left the House in 1947.
425	George B. Schwabe	R	OK-01	January 3, 1945	1st term	
426	Edgar A. Sharp	R	NY-01	January 3, 1945	1st term	Left the House in 1947.
427	Robert L. F. Sikes	D	FL-03	January 3, 1945; Previous service, 1941–1944.	3rd term*	
428	Frank Starkey	D	MN-04	January 3, 1945	1st term	Left the House in 1947.
429	John B. Sullivan	D	MO-11	January 3, 1945; Previous service, 1941–1943.	2nd term*	Left the House in 1947.
430	William R. Thom	D	OH-16	January 3, 1945; Previous service, 1933–1939 and 1941–1943.	5th term**	Left the House in 1947.
431	Philip A. Traynor	D	DE	January 3, 1945; Previous service, 1941–1943.	2nd term*	Left the House in 1947.
432	James William Trimble	D	AR-03	January 3, 1945	1st term	
433	John Stephens Wood	D	GA-09	January 3, 1945; Previous service, 1931–1935.	3rd term*	
434	Chase G. Woodhouse	D	CT-02	January 3, 1945	1st term	Left the House in 1947.
	John E. Fogarty	D	RI-02	February 7, 1945; Previous service, 1941–1944	3rd term*	
	J. Vaughan Gary	D	VA-03	March 6, 1945	1st term	
	Wesley A. D'Ewart	R	MT-02	June 5, 1945	1st term	
	Roy Clippinger	R	IL-24	November 6, 1945	1st term	
	Frank A. Mathews Jr.	R	NJ-04	November 6, 1945	1st term	
	A. Walter Norblad	R	OR-01	January 18, 1946	1st term	
	J. Lindsay Almond	D	VA-06	January 22, 1946	1st term	
	Sam Ervin	D	NC-10	January 22, 1946	1st term	Left the House in 1947.
	Helen Douglas Mankin	D	GA-05	February 12, 1946	1st term	Left the House in 1947.
	Arthur G. Klein	D	NY-19	February 19, 1946; Previous service, 1941–1945.	3rd term*	
	Frank Buchanan	D	PA-33	May 21, 1946	1st term	
	Carl Henry Hoffman	R	PA-23	May 21, 1946	1st term	Left the House in 1947.
	Eliza Jane Pratt	D	NC-08	May 25, 1946	1st term	Left the House in 1947.
	Olin E. Teague	D	TX-06	August 24, 1946	1st term	
	Burr Harrison	D	VA-07	November 5, 1946	1st term	
	James P. Scoblick	R	PA-10	November 5, 1946	1st term	
	Thomas B. Stanley	D	VA-05	November 5, 1946	1st term	

== Delegates ==
Rank	Delegate	Party	District	Seniority date (Previous service, if any)	No.# of term(s)	Notes
1	Joseph Rider Farrington	R	HI	January 3, 1943	2nd term	
2	Carlos P. Romulo	Lib	PHL	August 10, 1944	2nd term	
3	Bob Bartlett	D	AK	January 3, 1945	1st term	
4	Jesús T. Piñero	D	PR	January 3, 1945	1st term	
	Antonio Fernós-Isern	D	PR	September 11, 1946	1st term	

== See also ==
- 79th United States Congress
- List of United States congressional districts
- List of United States senators in the 79th Congress
