= Thomas Sutler Williams =

American politician & jurist (1872–1940)

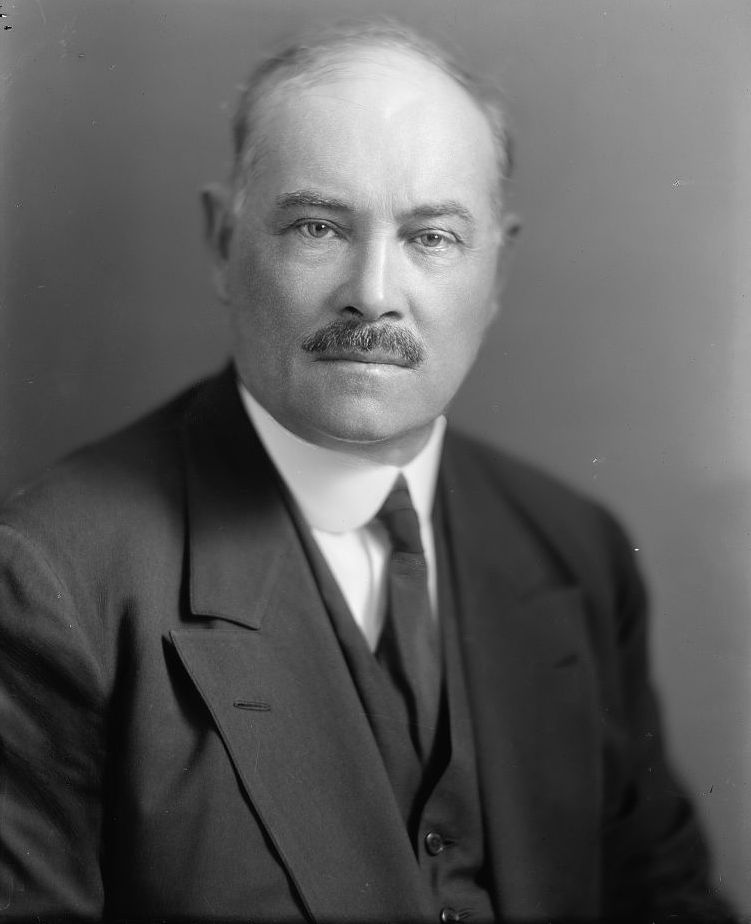

Judge of the Court of Claims
- In office November 1, 1929 – April 5, 1940
- Appointed by: Herbert Hoover
- Preceded by: Nicholas J. Sinnott
- Succeeded by: John Marvin Jones

Member of the U.S. House of Representatives from Illinois's 24th district
- In office March 4, 1915 – November 11, 1929
- Preceded by: H. Robert Fowler
- Succeeded by: Claude V. Parsons

Member of the Illinois House of Representatives
- In office 1899-1901

Personal details
- Born: Thomas Sutler Williams; February 14, 1872 Louisville, Illinois, US
- Died: April 5, 1940 (aged 68) Washington, D.C., US
- Resting place: Cedar Hill Cemetery
- Party: Republican
- Education: Austin College

Thomas Sutler Williams (February 14, 1872 – April 5, 1940) was a United States representative from Illinois and a judge of the Court of Claims.

== Education and career ==
Born on February 14, 1872, in Louisville, Clay County, Illinois, Williams attended the Willis district school, Louisville High School and then graduated in 1896 from Austin College in Effingham, Illinois. He entered private practice in Louisville, Illinois from 1896 to 1915. He was city attorney of Louisville, Illinois from 1897 to 1899. He was a member of the Illinois House of Representatives from 1899 to 1901. He was Mayor of Louisville, Illinois from 1907 to 1909. He was a prosecutor for Clay County from 1908 to 1915. He became the owner and publisher of the Clay County Republican in Louisville, Illinois in 1920. He moved to Harrisburg, Saline County, Illinois in 1926.

== Congressional service ==
Williams was elected as a Republican to the United States House of Representatives of the 64th United States Congress and to the seven succeeding Congresses and served from March 4, 1915, until his resignation November 11, 1929. He was Chairman of the Committee on Expenditures in the Department of Commerce for the 66th United States Congress.

== Federal judicial service ==
Williams was nominated by President Herbert Hoover on October 17, 1929, to a seat on the Court of Claims (later the United States Court of Claims) vacated by Judge Nicholas J. Sinnott. He was confirmed by the United States Senate on November 1, 1929, and received his commission the same day. His service terminated on April 5, 1940, due to his death in Washington, D.C. He was interred in Cedar Hill Cemetery.

== Williams v. United States ==
While a judge, Williams' salary was reduced by the Legislative Appropriation Act of June 30, 1932, which was part of Congress's efforts to economize the costs of government during the Great Depression. Williams sued the federal government, claiming that his salary could not be reduced because Section 1 of Article III of the United States Constitution forbids it. The Supreme Court ruled on Williams v. United States in 1933, deciding that the Court of Claims was an Article I, or legislative, court and that therefore Congress had the authority to reduce the salaries of the judges of the Court of Claims.

== Sources ==
- United States Congress. "Thomas Sutler Williams (id: W000542)". Biographical Directory of the United States Congress.
- "Williams, Thomas Sutler - Federal Judicial Center". www.fjc.gov.

U.S. House of Representatives
Preceded by H. Robert Fowler	Member of the U.S. House of Representatives from Illinois's 24th congressional district 1915–1929	Succeeded by Claude V. Parsons
Legal offices
Preceded by Nicholas J. Sinnott	Judge of the Court of Claims; 1929–1940	Succeeded by John Marvin Jones
