= James R. Williams (politician) =

American politician

James Robert Williams
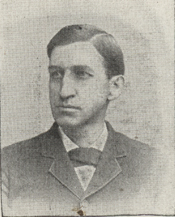

Member of the U.S. House of Representatives from Illinois
- In office December 2, 1889 – March 3, 1895
- Preceded by: Richard W. Townshend
- Succeeded by: Benson Wood
- Constituency: 19th district
- In office March 4, 1899 – March 3, 1903
- Preceded by: James R. Campbell
- Succeeded by: Henry T. Rainey
- Constituency: 20th district
- In office March 4, 1903 – March 3, 1905
- Preceded by: District created
- Succeeded by: Pleasant T. Chapman
- Constituency: 24th district

Personal details
- Born: December 27, 1850 Carmi, Illinois, U.S.
- Died: November 8, 1923 (aged 72) Loma Linda, California, U.S.
- Resting place: Maple Ridge Cemetery, Carmi, Illinois, U.S.
- Party: Democratic
- Education: Union College of Law

James Robert Williams (December 27, 1850 – November 8, 1923) was a U.S. representative from Illinois.

Born in Carmi, Illinois, Williams attended the common schools. He graduated from Indiana University in 1875, where he was a member of Phi Kappa Psi, and from the Union College of Law, Chicago, Illinois, in 1876. He was admitted to the bar in 1876 and returned home to practice in Carmi. He served as master in chancery from 1880 to 1882, and was a county judge of White County from 1882 to 1886.

Williams was elected as a Democrat to the Fifty-first Congress to fill the vacancy caused by the death of Richard W. Townshend. He was reelected to the Fifty-second and Fifty-third Congresses and served from December 2, 1889, to March 3, 1895.

Williams was a friend of William Jennings Bryan. Because of their friendship, Bryan made a whistle-stop visit to Carmi in 1896 to give a presidential campaign speech.

Williams was elected to the Fifty-sixth, Fifty-seventh, and Fifty-eighth Congresses (March 4, 1899 – March 3, 1905).

In 1902, the Chicago Chronicle said he was being groomed for president. "Bob Williams for President" headlined the Chicago Evening Post on November 9, 1903. In 1903, Illinois Democrats nominated Williams for the United States Senate. He did not win but received a letter from Williams Jennings Bryan, who expressed an interest in talking with him about plans for 1904. In 1904, his name was presented to the National Convention at St. Louis, Missouri, as a candidate for vice-president. Williams came in second place for the Democratic vice presidential nomination.

In 1904, Williams was defeated in his bid for reelection by Pleasant T. Chapman. After his term in the House of Representatives, he resumed the practice of his profession. He died in Loma Linda, California on November 8, 1923. He was interred in Maple Ridge Cemetery, Carmi, Illinois.

U.S. House of Representatives
Preceded by Richard W. Townshend	Member of the U.S. House of Representatives from Illinois's 19th congressional district December 2, 1889 – March 3, 1895	Succeeded by Benson Wood
Preceded by James R. Campbell	Member of the U.S. House of Representatives from Illinois's 20th congressional district March 4, 1899 – March 3, 1903	Succeeded by Henry T. Rainey
Preceded by District created	Member of the U.S. House of Representatives from Illinois's 24th congressional district March 4, 1903 – March 3, 1905	Succeeded by Pleasant T. Chapman
