= H. Robert Fowler =

American politician

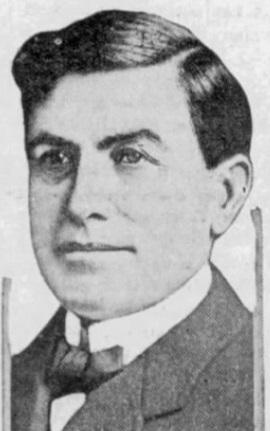
- The Tooele Transcript (Tooele, Utah), January 21, 1916

Member of the U.S. House of Representatives from Illinois's 24th district
- In office March 4, 1911 – March 3, 1915
- Preceded by: Pleasant T. Chapman
- Succeeded by: Thomas S. Williams

Member of the Illinois Senate
- In office 1900-1904

Member of the Illinois House of Representatives
- In office 1893-1895

Personal details
- Born: Hiram Robert Fowler; February 7, 1851 near Eddyville, Illinois, US
- Died: January 5, 1926 (aged 74) Harrisburg, Illinois, US
- Party: Democratic
- Education: Illinois Normal University; University of Michigan Law School
- Occupation: lawyer

Hiram Robert Fowler (February 7, 1851 – January 5, 1926) was a U.S. representative from Illinois.

== Early life and education ==
Born near Eddyville, Illinois, Fowler attended the public schools of his native city, and graduated from the Illinois Normal University at Normal in 1880. He studied law at the University of Michigan at Ann Arbor and graduated in 1884. He was admitted to the bar in 1884, and commenced the practice of his profession in Elizabethtown, Illinois.

== Career in politics ==
Fowler served as State's Attorney of Hardin County from 1888 to 1892. He also served in the state house of representatives from 1893 to 1895, and he later served as a member of the state senate from 1900 to 1904. Fowler was elected as a Democrat to the Sixty-second and Sixty-third Congresses (March 4, 1911 – March 3, 1915). However, he was an unsuccessful candidate for reelection in 1914.

== Later life ==
After his unsuccessful campaign in 1914, Fowler resumed the practice of law in Elizabethtown, Illinois. He moved to Harrisburg, Illinois in 1915 and continued practice until his death on January 5, 1926. He was interred in Sunset Hill Cemetery.

U.S. House of Representatives
Preceded by Pleasant T. Chapman	Member of the U.S. House of Representatives from Illinois's 24th congressional district 1911-1915	Succeeded by Thomas S. Williams
