= Pleasant T. Chapman =

American politician

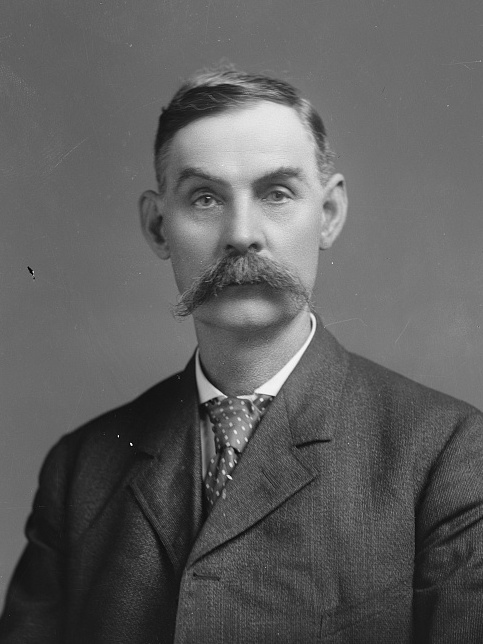

Member of the U.S. House of Representatives from Illinois's 24th district
- In office March 4, 1905 – March 3, 1911
- Preceded by: James R. Williams
- Succeeded by: H. Robert Fowler

Member of the Illinois Senate
- In office 1890-1902

Personal details
- Born: Pleasant Thomas Chapman; October 8, 1854 Vienna, Illinois, US
- Died: January 31, 1931 (aged 76) Vienna, Illinois, US
- Party: Republican
- Education: McKendree College
- Occupation: lawyer

Pleasant Thomas Chapman (October 8, 1854 – January 31, 1931) was a U.S. representative from Illinois.

Born on a farm near Vienna, Illinois, Chapman attended the public schools, and then went to McKendree College, in Lebanon, Illinois. Chapman graduated from McKendree in June, 1876.

He taught school while studying law, and served as superintendent of public schools of Johnson County from 1877 to 1882.

He was admitted to the bar at Mount Vernon, Illinois, in 1878 and commenced practice in Vienna, Illinois.

He also engaged in banking and in agricultural pursuits. He served as judge of Johnson County from 1882 to 1890. He was a member of the Illinois State Senate from 1890 to 1902.

Chapman was elected as a Republican to the Fifty-ninth. He was reelected to the Sixtieth and Sixty-first Congresses, and served from March 4, 1905, to March 3, 1911. He was an unsuccessful candidate for reelection in 1910 to the Sixty-second Congress.

After leaving Congress Chapman resumed his legal, banking, business and farming interests. He was a delegate to the 1924 Republican National Convention.

He died in Vienna on January 31, 1931, and was interred in Vienna's Fraternal Cemetery.

U.S. House of Representatives
Preceded by James R. Williams	Member of the U.S. House of Representatives from Illinois's 24th congressional district 1905-1911	Succeeded by H. Robert Fowler
