= List of United States senators in the 79th Congress =

This is a complete list of United States senators during the 79th United States Congress listed by seniority from January 3, 1945, to January 3, 1947.

Order of service is based on the commencement of the senator's first term. Behind this is former service as a senator (only giving the senator seniority within their new incoming class), service as vice president, a House member, a cabinet secretary, or a governor of a state. The final factor is the population of the senator's state.

Senators who were sworn in during the middle of the two-year congressional term (up until the last senator who was not sworn in early after winning the November 1946 election) are listed at the end of the list with no number.

In this Congress, Richard Russell was the most senior junior senator. The distinction of most junior senior senator passed between four different individuals in this Congress, due to various deaths and resignations: Guy Cordon, from January 3 to 10, 1945; Warren Magnuson from January 10 to 17, 1945; Forrest Donnell from January 17 to November 10, 1945; and Glen Taylor from November 10, 1945 through the end of the 79th Congress.

== Terms of service ==
Class	Terms of service of senators that expired in years
Class 1	Terms of service of senators that expired in 1947 (AZ, CA, CT, DE, FL, IN, MA, MD, ME, MI, MN, MO, MS, MT, ND, NE, NJ, NM, NV, NY, OH, PA, RI, TN, TX, UT, VA, VT, WA, WI, WV, and WY.)
Class 2	Terms of service of senators that expired in 1949 (AL, AR, CO, DE, GA, IA, ID, IL, KS, KY, LA, MA, ME, MI, MN, MS, MT, NC, NE, NH, NJ, NM, OK, OR, RI, SC, SD, TN, TX, VA, WV, and WY.)
Class 3	Terms of service of senators that expired in 1951 (AL, AR, AZ, CA, CO, CT, FL, GA, ID, IL, IN, IA, KS, KY, LA, MD, MO, NC, ND, NH, NV, NY, OH, OK, OR, PA, SC, SD, UT, VT, WA, and WI.)

== U.S. Senate seniority list ==
U.S. Senate seniority
Rank	Senator (party-state)	Seniority date	Other factors
1	Kenneth McKellar (D-TN)	March 4, 1917	
2	Hiram Johnson (R-CA)	March 16, 1917	
3	Arthur Capper (R-KS)	March 4, 1919	
4	Carter Glass (D-VA)	February 2, 1920	
5	Walter F. George (D-GA)	November 22, 1922	
6	Henrik Shipstead (R-MN)	March 4, 1923	Minnesota 17th in population (1920)
7	Burton K. Wheeler (D-MT)	March 4, 1923	Montana 39th in population (1920)
8	Robert M. La Follette, Jr. (WP-WI)	September 30, 1925	
9	David I. Walsh (D-MA)	December 6, 1926	
10	Carl Hayden (D-AZ)	March 4, 1927	Former United States representative from Arizona (15 years)
11	Alben W. Barkley (D-KY)	March 4, 1927	Former United States representative from Kentucky (14 years)
12	Elmer Thomas (D-OK)	March 4, 1927	Former representative (4 years), Oklahoma 21st in population (1920)
13	Millard Tydings (D-MD)	March 4, 1927	Former representative (4 years), Maryland 28th in population (1920)
14	Robert F. Wagner (D-NY)	March 4, 1927	
15	Arthur H. Vandenberg (R-MI)	March 31, 1928	
16	Tom Connally (D-TX)	March 4, 1929	
17	Wallace H. White, Jr. (R-ME)	March 4, 1931	Former representative
18	Josiah W. Bailey (D-NC)	March 4, 1931	North Carolina 12th in population (1930)
19	John H. Bankhead II (D-AL)	March 4, 1931	Alabama 15th in population (1930)
20	Warren Austin (R-VT)	April 1, 1931	
21	Richard Russell, Jr. (D-GA)	January 12, 1933	
22	John H. Overton (D-LA)	March 4, 1933	Former representative
23	Harry F. Byrd, Sr. (D-VA)	March 4, 1933	Former governor
24	Elbert D. Thomas (D-UT)	March 4, 1933	Utah 40th in population (1930)
25	Pat McCarran (D-NV)	March 4, 1933	Nevada 48th in population (1930)
26	Carl Hatch (D-NM)	October 10, 1933	
27	Joseph C. O'Mahoney (D-WY)	January 1, 1934	
28	James Murray (D-MT)	November 7, 1934	
29	Peter G. Gerry (D-RI)	January 3, 1935	Former senator
30	George L. P. Radcliffe (D-MD)	January 3, 1935	Former representative
31	Theodore G. Bilbo (D-MS)	January 3, 1935	Former governor
32	Joseph F. Guffey (D-PA)	January 3, 1935	Pennsylvania 2nd in population (1930)
33	Harry S. Truman (D-MO)	January 3, 1935	Missouri 10th in population (1930)
34	Francis T. Maloney (D-CT)	January 3, 1935	Connecticut 29th in population (1930)
35	Dennis Chavez (D-NM)	May 11, 1935	
36	Charles O. Andrews (D-FL)	November 4, 1936	"A" 1st in alphabet
37	Claude Pepper (D-FL)	November 4, 1936	"P" 16th in alphabet
38	Edwin C. Johnson (D-CO)	January 3, 1937	Former governor, Colorado 33rd in population (1930)
39	Theodore F. Green (D-RI)	January 3, 1937	Former governor, Rhode Island 37th in population (1930)
40	Styles Bridges (R-NH)	January 3, 1937	Former governor, New Hampshire 41st in population (1930)
41	Allen J. Ellender (D-LA)	January 3, 1937	
42	Joseph L. Hill (D-AL)	January 11, 1938	
43	Tom Stewart (D-TN)	November 9, 1938	
44	James M. Mead (D-NY)	December 3, 1938	
45	Scott W. Lucas (D-IL)	January 3, 1939	Former representative (4 years)
46	Charles W. Tobey (R-NH)	January 3, 1939	Former representative (2 years)
47	Clyde M. Reed (R-KS)	January 3, 1939	Former governor
48	Robert A. Taft (R-OH)	January 3, 1939	Ohio 4th in population (1930)
49	Sheridan Downey (D-CA)	January 3, 1939	California 6th in population (1930)
50	Alexander Wiley (R-WI)	January 3, 1939	Wisconsin 13th in population (1930)
51	John Chandler Gurney (R-SD)	January 3, 1939	South Dakota 36th in population (1930)
52	Albert B. Chandler (D-KY)	October 9, 1939	
53	John Thomas (R-ID)	January 27, 1940	
54	C. Wayland Brooks (R-IL)	November 22, 1940	
55	Monrad C. Wallgren (D-WA)	December 19, 1940	
56	Abe Murdock (D-UT)	January 3, 1941	Former representative (8 years)
57	Ralph Owen Brewster (R-ME)	January 3, 1941	Former representative (6 years)
58	William Langer (R-ND)	January 3, 1941	Former governor
59	Harold H. Burton (R-OH)	January 3, 1941	Ohio 4th in population (1940)
60	Raymond E. Willis (R-IN)	January 3, 1941	Indiana 12th in population (1940)
61	Harley M. Kilgore (D-WV)	January 3, 1941	West Virginia 24th in population (1940)
62	Hugh A. Butler (R-NE)	January 3, 1941	Nebraska 32nd in population (1940)
63	Ernest McFarland (D-AZ)	January 3, 1941	Arizona 43rd in population (1940)
64	James M. Tunnell (D-DE)	January 3, 1941	Delaware 47th in population (1940)
65	George Aiken (R-VT)	January 10, 1941	
66	W. Lee O'Daniel (D-TX)	August 4, 1941	
67	Burnet R. Maybank (D-SC)	November 5, 1941	
68	Eugene D. Millikin (R-CO)	December 20, 1941	
69	James G. Scrugham (D-NV)	December 7, 1942	
70	Joseph H. Ball (R-MN)	January 3, 1943	Former senator (2 years)
71	James Eastland (D-MS)	January 3, 1943	Former senator (1 year)
72	John Little McClellan (D-AR)	January 3, 1943	Arkansas 25th in population (1940)
73	Harlan J. Bushfield (R-SD)	January 3, 1943	Former governor, South Dakota 37th in population (1940)
74	C. Douglass Buck (R-DE)	January 3, 1943	Former governor, Delaware 47th in population (1940)
75	Homer S. Ferguson (R-MI)	January 3, 1943	Michigan 7th in population (1940)
76	Albert W. Hawkes (R-NJ)	January 3, 1943	New Jersey 9th in population (1940)
77	Edward H. Moore (R-OK)	January 3, 1943	Oklahoma 22nd in population (1940)
78	W. Chapman Revercomb (R-WV)	January 3, 1943	West Virginia 24th in population (1940)
79	Kenneth S. Wherry (R-NE)	January 3, 1943	Nebraska 32nd in population (1940)
80	Edward V. Robertson (R-WY)	January 3, 1943	Wyoming 46th in population (1940)
81	George A. Wilson (R-IA)	January 14, 1943	
82	Guy Cordon (R-OR)	March 4, 1944	
83	Howard A. Smith (R-NJ)	December 7, 1944	
84	Warren G. Magnuson (D-WA)	December 14, 1944	
85	Francis J. Myers (D-PA)	January 3, 1945	Former representative (6 years)
86	J. William Fulbright (D-AR)	January 3, 1945	Former representative (2 years)
87	Clyde R. Hoey (D-NC)	January 3, 1945	Former representative (1 year, 2 months)
88	Forrest C. Donnell (R-MO)	January 3, 1945	Former governor, Missouri 10th in population (1940)
89	Bourke B. Hickenlooper (R-IA)	January 3, 1945	Former governor, Iowa 20th in population (1940)
90	Olin D. Johnston (D-SC)	January 3, 1945	Former governor, South Carolina 26th in population (1940)
91	John Moses (D-ND)	January 3, 1945	Former governor, North Dakota 38th in population (1940)
92	Homer E. Capehart (R-IN)	January 3, 1945	Indiana 12th in population (1940)
93	Brien McMahon (D-CT)	January 3, 1945	Connecticut 31st in population (1940)
94	Wayne Morse (R-OR)	January 3, 1945	Oregon 34th in population (1940)
95	Glen H. Taylor (D-ID)	January 3, 1945	Idaho 42nd in population (1940)
96	Leverett Saltonstall (R-MA)	January 4, 1945	
—	Hugh Mitchell (D-WA)	January 10, 1945	
—	Frank P. Briggs (D-MO)	January 18, 1945	
—	Thomas C. Hart (R-CT)	February 15, 1945	
—	Milton Young (R-ND)	March 12, 1945	
—	Edward P. Carville (D-NV)	July 24, 1945	
—	William F. Knowland (R-CA)	August 26, 1945	
—	James W. Huffman (D-OH)	October 8, 1945	
—	Charles C. Gossett (D-ID)	November 17, 1945	
—	William A. Stanfill (R-KY)	November 19, 1945	
—	Thomas G. Burch (D-VA)	May 31, 1946	
—	George R. Swift (D-AL)	June 15, 1946	
—	Spessard Holland (D-FL)	September 25, 1946	
—	Ralph Flanders (R-VT)	November 1, 1946	
—	A. Willis Robertson (D-VA)	November 6, 1946	Former representative (13 years)
—	John Sparkman (D-AL)	November 6, 1946	Former representative (9 years)
—	Henry Dworshak (R-ID)	November 6, 1946	Former representative (7 years)
—	Kingsley A. Taft (R-OH)	November 6, 1946	Ohio 4th in population (1940)
—	John Sherman Cooper (R-KY)	November 6, 1946	Kentucky 16th in population (1940)
—	William B. Umstead (D-NC)	December 18, 1946	
—	Harry P. Cain (R-WA)	December 26, 1946	
—	Raymond E. Baldwin (R-CT)	December 27, 1946	

The most senior senators by class were Kenneth McKellar (D-Tennessee) from Class 1, Arthur Capper (R-Kansas) from Class 2, and Walter F. George (D-Georgia) from Class 3.

== See also ==
- 79th United States Congress
- List of United States representatives in the 79th Congress
