= Claude V. Parsons =

American politician

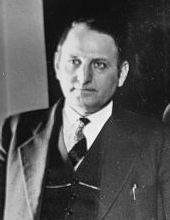

Member of the U.S. House of Representatives from Illinois's 24th district
- In office November 4, 1930 – January 3, 1941
- Preceded by: Thomas Sutler Williams
- Succeeded by: James V. Heidinger

Personal details
- Born: Claude VanCleve Parsons; October 7, 1895 Pope County, Illinois, U.S.
- Died: May 23, 1941 (aged 45) Washington, D.C., U.S.
- Party: Democratic
- Occupation: editor and newspaper publisher

Claude VanCleve Parsons (October 7, 1895 – May 23, 1941) was a U.S. representative from Illinois.

Born on a farm near McCormick, Pope County, Illinois, Parsons attended the public schools. He taught in the rural schools of Pope County, Illinois from 1914 to 1922. He was graduated from Southern Illinois State Normal School at Carbondale in 1923. He moved to Golconda, Illinois, in 1922 to become county superintendent of schools, in which capacity he served until 1930. He was also engaged as an editor and newspaper publisher from 1924 to 1930.

Parsons was elected on November 4, 1930, as a Democrat to the Seventy-first Congress to fill the vacancy caused by the resignation of Thomas S. Williams and on the same day was elected to the Seventy-second Congress. He was reelected to the Seventy-third and to the three succeeding Congresses and served from November 4, 1930, to January 3, 1941. He was an unsuccessful candidate for reelection in 1940 to the Seventy-seventh Congress. He was appointed first assistant administrator of the United States Housing Authority February 14, 1941, and served until his death in Washington, D.C., May 23, 1941. He was interred in Zion Church Cemetery, near Ozark, Illinois.

U.S. House of Representatives
Preceded by Thomas S. Williams	Member of the U.S. House of Representatives from Illinois's 24th congressional district November 4, 1930 - January 3, 1941	Succeeded by James V. Heidinger
