= Richard W. Townshend =

American politician (1840–1889)

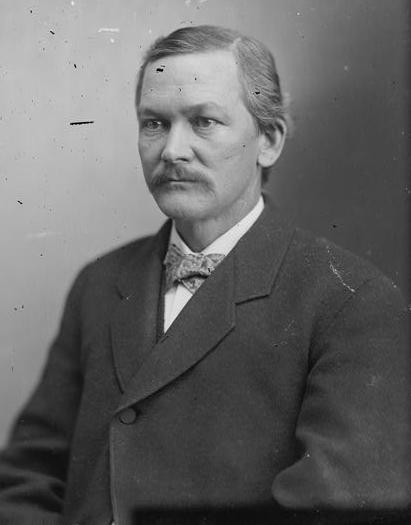

Member of the U.S. House of Representatives from Illinois's 19th district
- In office March 4, 1877 – March 9, 1889
- Preceded by: William B. Anderson
- Succeeded by: James R. Williams

Personal details
- Born: April 30, 1840 Upper Marlboro, Maryland, U.S.
- Died: March 9, 1889 (aged 48) Washington, D.C., U.S.
- Resting place: Rock Creek Cemetery; Washington, D.C., U.S.
- Party: Democratic

Richard Wellington Townshend (April 30, 1840 – March 9, 1889) was a lawyer and U.S. representative from Illinois.

Born near Upper Marlboro, Maryland, Townshend moved to Washington, D.C., in 1846. He attended public and private schools. He moved to Cairo, Illinois, in 1858. He taught school in Fayette County. He studied law. He was admitted to the bar in 1862 and commenced practice in McLeansboro, Illinois. He served as clerk of the circuit court of Hamilton County 1863–1868. He served as prosecuting attorney for the twelfth judicial circuit of Illinois 1868–1872. He served as member of the Democratic State central committee in 1864, 1865, 1874, and 1875. He served as delegate to the Democratic National Convention in 1872. He moved to Shawneetown, Illinois, in 1873 and resumed the practice of law. Townshend was elected as a Democrat to the Forty-fifth and to the six succeeding Congresses and served from March 4, 1877, until his death in Washington, D.C., March 9, 1889.

He served as chairman of the Committee on Expenditures in the Department of the Navy (Forty-sixth Congress), Committee on Military Affairs (Fiftieth Congress). Townshend said that the Jim Crow era South (controlled by his fellow Democrats) had "turned her face to the sun of freedom". However, he accused supporters of Chinese immigration of supporting slavery and quoted bigoted views of the Chinese describing them as "debased" and describing Chinese cities as "abominations". He was interred in Rock Creek Cemetery.

== See also ==
- List of members of the United States Congress who died in office (1790–1899)

U.S. House of Representatives
| Preceded by William B. Anderson | Member of the U.S. House of Representatives from Illinois's 19th congressional district 1877–1889 | Succeeded by James R. Williams |
