= James V. Heidinger =

American politician

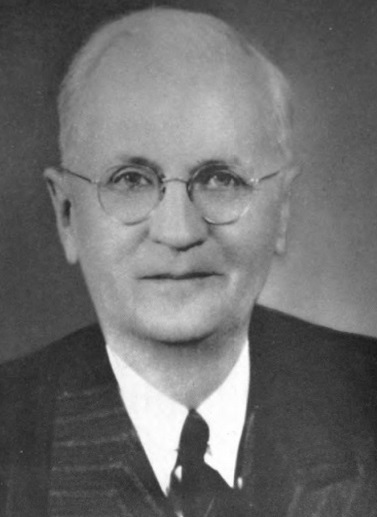

Member of the U.S. House of Representatives from Illinois's 24th district
- In office January 3, 1941 – March 22, 1945
- Preceded by: Claude V. Parsons
- Succeeded by: Roy Clippinger

Personal details
- Born: James Vandaveer Heidinger; July 17, 1882 Mount Erie, Illinois, US
- Died: March 22, 1945 (aged 62) Phoenix, Arizona, US
- Party: Republican
- Education: Northern Illinois College of Law
- Occupation: lawyer

James Vandaveer Heidinger (July 17, 1882 – March 22, 1945) was a U.S. representative from Illinois.

He was born on a farm near Mount Erie, Illinois, he attended the rural schools, Northern Illinois Normal School, De Kalb, Illinois, and Valparaiso (Indiana) University. He taught in the rural schools of Wayne County, Illinois. He was graduated from Northern Illinois College of Law, Dixon, Illinois, in 1908. He was admitted to the bar the same year and commenced practice in Fairfield, Illinois. He was the county judge of Wayne County, Illinois from 1914 to 1926. He served as assistant attorney general of Illinois 1927-1933. He served as delegate to the Republican National Convention in 1928. He was an unsuccessful candidate for election to the Seventy-second and Seventy-fourth Congresses.

Heidinger was elected as a Republican to the Seventy-seventh, Seventy-eighth, and Seventy-ninth Congresses and served from January 3, 1941, until his death in Phoenix, Arizona from pulmonary fibrosis, on March 22, 1945. He was interred in Maple Hill Cemetery, Fairfield, Illinois.

== See also ==
- List of members of the United States Congress who died in office (1900–1949)

U.S. House of Representatives
Preceded by Claude V. Parsons	Member of the U.S. House of Representatives from Illinois's 24th congressional district January 3, 1941 - March 22, 1945	Succeeded by Roy Clippinger
