= Roy Clippinger =

American politician

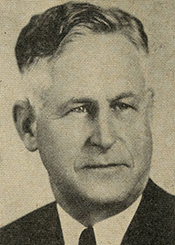
- From 1947's Pictorial Directory of the 80th Congress

Member of the U.S. House of Representatives from Illinois's 24th district
- In office November 6, 1945 – January 3, 1949
- Preceded by: James V. Heidinger
- Succeeded by: Charles W. Vursell

Personal details
- Born: January 13, 1886 Fairfield, Illinois, U.S.
- Died: December 24, 1962 (aged 76) Carmi, Illinois, U.S.
- Party: Republican
- Occupation: publisher and editor

Roy Clippinger (January 13, 1886 – December 24, 1962) was a U.S. representative from Illinois.

Born in Fairfield, Illinois, Clippinger attended the public schools. Learned the printer's trade and engaged in the newspaper business. He was publisher and editor 1909–1961. Founder and president of the Board of Greater Weeklies, New York City. He served as president of the Carmi, Illinois, Hospital Association 1945–1948. Manager of the White County, Illinois, Bridge Commission 1941–1961. He engaged in the furniture business 1947–1950.

Clippinger was elected as a Republican to the Seventy-ninth Congress to fill the vacancy caused by the death of James V. Heidinger. He was reelected in 1946 to the Eightieth Congress and served from November 6, 1945, to January 3, 1949. He was not a candidate for renomination in 1948. He resumed his former business pursuits. He was a resident of Carmi, Illinois, where he died on December 24, 1962. He was interred in I.O.O.F. Cemetery, McLeansboro, Illinois.

U.S. House of Representatives
Preceded by James V. Heidinger	Member of the U.S. House of Representatives from Illinois's 24th congressional district November 6, 1945 - January 3, 1949	Succeeded by Charles W. Vursell
