= Illinois's 24th congressional district =

Former U.S. House district in Illinois

- Obsolete district
- Created: 1900
- Eliminated: 1980
- Years active: 1903-1983

The 24th congressional district of Illinois was a congressional district for the United States House of Representatives in Illinois. It was eliminated as a result of the redistricting cycle after the 1980 census. It was last represented by Paul Simon who was redistricted into the 22nd district.

== List of members representing the district ==
Representative	Party	Years	Cong ress	Notes
District created March 4, 1903
James R. Williams (Carmi)	Democratic	March 4, 1903 – March 3, 1905	58th	Redistricted from the 20th district and re-elected in 1902. Lost re-election.
Pleasant T. Chapman (Vienna)	Republican	March 4, 1905 – March 3, 1911	59th 60th 61st	Elected in 1904. Re-elected in 1906. Re-elected in 1908. Lost re-election.
H. Robert Fowler (Elizabethtown)	Democratic	March 4, 1911 – March 3, 1915	62nd 63rd	Elected in 1910. Re-elected in 1912. Lost re-election.
Thomas S. Williams (Louisville)	Republican	March 4, 1915 – November 11, 1929	64th 65th 66th 67th 68th 69th 70th 71st	Elected in 1914. Re-elected in 1916. Re-elected in 1918. Re-elected in 1920. Re-elected in 1922. Re-elected in 1924. Re-elected in 1926. Re-elected in 1928. Resigned to become judge of the U.S. Court of Claims.
Vacant		November 11, 1929 – November 4, 1930	71st	
Claude V. Parsons (Golconda)	Democratic	November 4, 1930 – January 3, 1941	71st 72nd 73rd 74th 75th 76th	Elected to finish Williams's term. Re-elected in 1930. Re-elected in 1932. Re-elected in 1934. Re-elected in 1936. Re-elected in 1938. Lost re-election.
James V. Heidinger (Fairfield)	Republican	January 3, 1941 – March 22, 1945	77th 78th 79th	Elected in 1940. Re-elected in 1942. Re-elected in 1944. Died.
Vacant		March 22, 1945 – November 6, 1945	79th	
Roy Clippinger (Carmi)	Republican	November 6, 1945 – January 3, 1949	79th 80th	Elected to finish Heidinger's term. Re-elected in 1946. Retired.
Charles W. Vursell (Salem)	Republican	January 3, 1949 – January 3, 1953	81st 82nd	Redistricted from the 23rd district and re-elected in 1948. Re-elected in 1950. Redistricted to the 23rd district.
Melvin Price (East St. Louis)	Democratic	January 3, 1953 – January 3, 1973	83rd 84th 85th 86th 87th 88th 89th 90th 91st 92nd	Redistricted from the 25th district and re-elected in 1952. Re-elected in 1954. Re-elected in 1956. Re-elected in 1958. Re-elected in 1960. Re-elected in 1962. Re-elected in 1964. Re-elected in 1966. Re-elected in 1968. Re-elected in 1970. Redistricted to the 23rd district.
Kenneth J. Gray (West Frankfort)	Democratic	January 3, 1973 – December 31, 1974	93rd	Redistricted from the 21st district and re-elected in 1972. Resigned.
Vacant		December 31, 1974 – January 3, 1975	93rd	
Paul Simon (Carbondale)	Democratic	January 3, 1975 – January 3, 1983	94th 95th 96th 97th	Elected in 1974; Re-elected in 1976. Re-elected in 1978. Re-elected in 1980. Redistricted to the 22nd district.
District inactive since January 3, 1983

== Electoral history ==
=== 1902 ===
1902 United States House of Representatives General Election
Party	Candidate	Votes	%
Democratic	James R. Williams	17,971	49.45
Republican	Pleasant T. Chapman	17,719	48.76
Prohibition	William T. Morris	651	1.79
Total votes		36,341	100.0

=== 1904 ===
1904 United States House of Representatives General Election
Party	Candidate	Votes	%	±%
Republican	Pleasant T. Chapman	20,556	50.72	+1.96%
Democratic	James R. Williams (incumbent)	18,664	46.05	−3.40%
Prohibition	Wilbur A. Morgan	1,231	3.04	+1.25%
Populist	Edward Turner	75	0.19	N/A
Total votes		40,526	100.0	

=== 1906 ===
1906 United States House of Representatives General Election
Party	Candidate	Votes	%	±%
Republican	Pleasant T. Chapman (incumbent)	18,020	51.17	+0.45%
Democratic	James R. Williams	16,241	46.12	+0.07%
Prohibition	George R. Leach	952	2.70	−0.34%
Total votes		35,213	100.0	

=== 1908 ===
1908 United States House of Representatives General Election
Party	Candidate	Votes	%	±%
Republican	Pleasant T. Chapman (incumbent)	21,833	52.38	+1.21%
Democratic	John Q. Ledbetter	18,333	43.98	−2.14%
Prohibition	Charles R. Montgomery	1,070	2.57	−0.13%
Socialist	John Snyder	448	1.08	N/A
Total votes		41,684	100.0	

=== 1910 ===
1910 United States House of Representatives General Election
Party	Candidate	Votes	%	±%
Democratic	H. Robert Fowler	17,235	48.82	+4.84%
Republican	Pleasant T. Chapman (incumbent)	16,918	47.92	−4.46%
Prohibition	T. J. Scott	630	1.78	−0.79%
Socialist	M. S. Dickerson	521	1.48	+0.40%
Total votes		35,304	100.0	

=== 1912 ===
1912 United States House of Representatives General Election
Party	Candidate	Votes	%	±%
Democratic	H. Robert Fowler (incumbent)	19,811	47.67	−1.15%
Republican	James B. Blackman	15,004	36.10	−11.82%
Progressive	A. J. Gibbons	5,129	12.34	N/A
Socialist	T. C. Mason	933	2.25	+0.77%
Prohibition	T. J. Scott	682	1.64	−0.14%
Total votes		41,559	100.0	

=== 1914 ===
1914 United States House of Representatives General Election
Party	Candidate	Votes	%	±%
Republican	Thomas S. Williams	18,311	49.91	+13.81%
Democratic	H. Robert Fowler (incumbent)	17,369	47.34	−0.33%
Progressive	A. J. Gibbons	995	2.71	−9.63%
Socialist	Noah C. Bainum	12	0.03	−2.22%
Total votes		36,688	100.0	

=== 1916 ===
1916 United States House of Representatives General Election
Party	Candidate	Votes	%	±%
Republican	Thomas S. Williams (incumbent)	23,768	54.99	+5.08%
Democratic	Louis W. Goetzman	18,540	42.89	−4.45%
Socialist	Jno. H Evans	916	2.12	+2.09%
Total votes		43,225	100.0	

=== 1918 ===
1918 United States House of Representatives General Election
Party	Candidate	Votes	%	±%
Republican	Thomas S. Williams (incumbent)	18,689	59.36	+4.37%
Democratic	James R. Campbell	12,412	39.42	−3.47%
Socialist	J. J. McGuinn	382	1.21	−0.91%
Total votes		31,483	100.0	

=== 1920 ===
1920 United States House of Representatives General Election
Party	Candidate	Votes	%	±%
Republican	Thomas S. Williams (incumbent)	38,472	60.91	+1.55%
Democratic	Asher R. Cox	22,019	34.86	−4.56%
Farmer–Labor	J. W. Bobinet	2,676	4.24	N/A
Total votes		63,167	100.0	

=== 1922 ===
1922 United States House of Representatives General Election
Party	Candidate	Votes	%	±%
Republican	Thomas S. Williams (incumbent)	29,141	50.77	−10.14%
Democratic	Dempsey T. Woodard	28,252	49.22	+14.36%
Total votes		57394	100.0	

=== 1924 ===
1924 United States House of Representatives General Election
Party	Candidate	Votes	%	±%
Republican	Thomas S. Williams (incumbent)	35,356	54.14	+3.37%
Democratic	H. Robert Fowler	29,954	45.86	−3.36%
Total votes		65,310	100.0	

=== 1926 ===
1926 United States House of Representatives General Election
Party	Candidate	Votes	%	±%
Republican	Thomas S. Williams (incumbent)	26,295	56.06	+1.92%
Democratic	John Marshall Karns	20,612	43.94	−1.92%
Total votes		46,907	100.0	

=== 1928 ===
1928 United States House of Representatives General Election
Party	Candidate	Votes	%	±%
Republican	Thomas S. Williams (incumbent)	36,239	58.44	+2.38%
Democratic	Val B. Campbell	25,773	41.56	−2.38%
Total votes		62,012	100.0	

=== 1930 ===
1930 United States House of Representatives General Election
Party	Candidate	Votes	%	±%
Democratic	Claude V. Parsons	26,929	50.18	+8.62%
Republican	James V. Heidinger	26,732	49.82	−8.62%
Total votes		53,661	100.0	

=== 1932 ===
1932 United States House of Representatives General Election
Party	Candidate	Votes	%	±%
Democratic	Claude V. Parsons (incumbent)	43,107	58.82	+8.64%
Republican	Arthur A. Miles	30,175	41.18	−8.64%
Total votes		73,282	100.0	

=== 1934 ===
1934 United States House of Representatives General Election
Party	Candidate	Votes	%	±%
Democratic	Claude V. Parsons (incumbent)	39,442	51.67	−7.15%
Republican	James V. Heidinger	36,891	48.33	+7.15%
Total votes		76,333	100.0	

=== 1936 ===
1936 United States House of Representatives General Election
Party	Candidate	Votes	%	±%
Democratic	Claude V. Parsons (incumbent)	45,740	51.68	+0.01%
Republican	W. A. Spenoe	42,764	48.32	−0.01%
Total votes		88,504	100.0	

=== 1938 ===
1938 United States House of Representatives General Election
Party	Candidate	Votes	%	±%
Democratic	Claude V. Parsons (incumbent)	40,633	51.10	−0.58%
Republican	R. R. Randolph	38,889	48.90	+0.58%
Total votes		79,522	100.0	

=== 1940 ===
1940 United States House of Representatives General Election
Party	Candidate	Votes	%	±%
Republican	James V. Heidinger	49,731	53.60	+4.70%
Democratic	Claude V. Parsons (incumbent)	43,050	46.40	−4.70%
Total votes		92,781	100.0	

=== 1942 ===
1942 United States House of Representatives General Election
Party	Candidate	Votes	%	±%
Republican	James V. Heidinger (incumbent)	37,008	58.39	+4.79%
Democratic	LeRoy Barham	26,377	41.61	−4.79%
Total votes		63,385	100.0	

=== 1944 ===
1944 United States House of Representatives General Election
Party	Candidate	Votes	%	±%
Republican	James V. Heidinger (incumbent)	42,927	58.22	−0.17%
Democratic	Early C. Phelps	30,808	41.78	+0.17%
Total votes		73,735	100.0	

=== 1945 (Special) ===
1945 United States House of Representatives Special Election
Party	Candidate	Votes	%	±%
Republican	Roy Clippinger	5,617	98.91	+40.69%
Write-in		62	1.09	N/A
Total votes		5,679	100.0	

=== 1946 ===
1946 United States House of Representatives General Election
Party	Candidate	Votes	%	±%
Republican	Roy Clippinger (incumbent)	37,909	58.87	−40.04%
Democratic	Edward Hines	26,483	41.13	N/A
Total votes		64,392	100.0	

=== 1948 ===
1948 United States House of Representatives General Election
Party	Candidate	Votes	%	±%
Republican	Charles W. Vursell	57,732	50.64	−8.23%
Democratic	John David Upchurch	56,262	49.35	+8.22%
Write-in		1	0.00	N/A
Total votes		113,995	100.0	

=== 1950 ===
1950 United States House of Representatives General Election
Party	Candidate	Votes	%	±%
Republican	Charles W. Vursell	62,692	55.32	+4.68%
Democratic	John David Upchurch	50,638	44.68	−4.67%
Total votes		113,330	100.0	

=== 1952 ===
1952 United States House of Representatives General Election
Party	Candidate	Votes	%	±%
Democratic	Melvin Price	117,408	64.80	+20.12%
Republican	Phyllis Stewart Schlafly	63,778	35.20	−20.12%
Total votes		181,186	100.0	

=== 1954 ===
1954 United States House of Representatives General Election
Party	Candidate	Votes	%	±%
Democratic	Melvin Price (incumbent)	90,482	69.15	+4.35%
Republican	John T. Thomas	40,358	30.85	−4.35%
Total votes		130,840	100.0	

=== 1956 ===
1956 United States House of Representatives General Election
Party	Candidate	Votes	%	±%
Democratic	Melvin Price (incumbent)	121,381	68.21	−0.94%
Republican	Waldo E. (Ernie) Schellenger	56,568	31.79	+0.94%
Total votes		177,949	100.0	

=== 1958 ===
1958 United States House of Representatives General Election
Party	Candidate	Votes	%	±%
Democratic	Melvin Price (incumbent)	94,231	76.05	+7.84%
Republican	Alex Chouinard	29,670	23.95	−7.84%
Total votes		123,901	100.0	

=== 1960 ===
1960 United States House of Representatives General Election
Party	Candidate	Votes	%	±%
Democratic	Melvin Price (incumbent)	144,560	72.22	−3.83%
Republican	Phyllis Stewart Schlafly	55,620	27.78	+3.83%
Total votes		200,180	100.0	

=== 1962 ===
1962 United States House of Representatives General Election
Party	Candidate	Votes	%	±%
Democratic	Melvin Price (incumbent)	95,522	73.75	+1.53%
Republican	Kurt Glaser	33,993	26.25	−1.53%
Total votes		129,515	100.0	

=== 1964 ===
1964 United States House of Representatives General Election
Party	Candidate	Votes	%	±%
Democratic	Melvin Price (incumbent)	144,743	75.72	+1.97%
Republican	G. S. (Kenneth) Mirza	46,419	24.28	−1.97%
Total votes		191,162	100.0	

=== 1966 ===
1966 United States House of Representatives General Election
Party	Candidate	Votes	%	±%
Democratic	Melvin Price (incumbent)	82,513	71.48	−4.24%
Republican	John S. Guthrie	32,915	28.52	+4.24%
Total votes		115,428	100.0	

=== 1968 ===
1970 United States House of Representatives General Election
Party	Candidate	Votes	%	±%
Democratic	Melvin Price (incumbent)	88,637	74.22	+2.90%
Republican	Scott R. Randolph	30,784	25.78	−2.90%
Total votes		119,421	100.0	

=== 1970 ===
1970 United States House of Representatives General Election
Party	Candidate	Votes	%	±%
Democratic	Melvin Price (incumbent)	88,637	74.22	+2.90%
Republican	Scott R. Randolph	30,784	25.78	−2.90%
Total votes		119,421	100.0	

=== 1972 ===
1972 United States House of Representatives General Election
Party	Candidate	Votes	%	±%
Democratic	Kenneth J. Gray	138,867	93.65	+19.43%
Independent	Hugh Muldoon	9,398	6.34	N/A
Write-in		13	0.01	N/A
Total votes		148,278	100.0	

=== 1974 ===
1974 United States House of Representatives General Election
Party	Candidate	Votes	%	±%
Democratic	Paul Simon	108,417	59.55	−34.10%
Republican	Val Oshel	73,634	40.45	N/A
Total votes		182,051	100.0	

=== 1976 ===
1976 United States House of Representatives General Election
Party	Candidate	Votes	%	±%
Democratic	Paul Simon (incumbent)	152,344	67.38	+7.83%
Republican	Peter G. Prineas	73,766	32.62	−7.83%
Total votes		226,110	100.0	

=== 1978 ===
1978 United States House of Representatives General Election
Party	Candidate	Votes	%	±%
Democratic	Paul Simon (incumbent)	110,298	65.63	−1.75%
Republican	John T. Anderson	57,763	34.37	+1.75%
Total votes		168,061	100.0	

=== 1980 ===
1980 United States House of Representatives General Election
Party	Candidate	Votes	%	±%
Democratic	Paul Simon (incumbent)	112,134	49.12	−16.51%
Republican	John T. Anderson	110,176	48.26	+13.89%
Constitution Party of Illinois	James H. Barrett	5,985	2.62	N/A
Write-in		1	0.00	N/A
Total votes		228,296	100.0	
